= Necro discography =

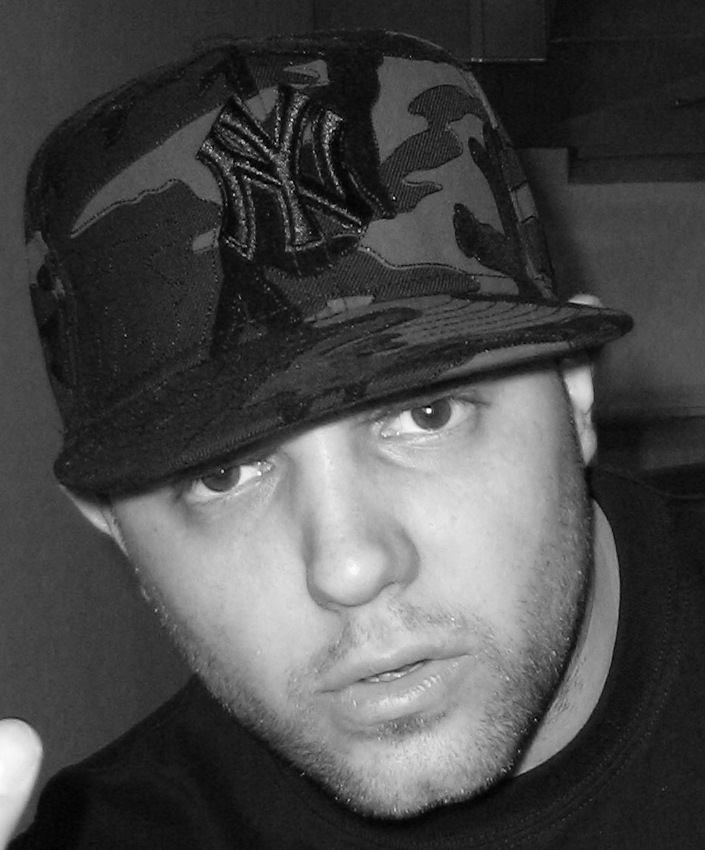
- Studio albums: 7
- Extended plays: 4
- Compilation albums: 9
- Singles: 40
- Video albums: 4
- Mixtapes: 3
- Box sets: 2
- Instrumental albums: 16
- Acapella albums: 4

American hip hop recording artist Ron "Necro" Braunstein has released seven studio albums, four extended plays (including one dubbed as 'double EP'), 30 compilation albums (including 2 box sets), three mixtapes with his older brother Ill Bill, and over 40 singles.

As a part of thrash metal trio Injustice, the band self-released two demo tapes in 1989 and 1990. In 1998, Necro released his debut extended play Cockroaches EP via Uncle Howie Records. Since founding Psycho+Logical-Records in November 1999, Necro has been releasing music through his own independent record label.

As a member of the Circle of Tyrants along with Ill Bill, Goretex and Mr. Hyde, a hip hop super-group released their only eponymous studio album in 2005.

He collaborated with Kool G Rap forming The Godfathers. The duo released two compilation albums The Pre-Kill Vol. 1 and The Pre-Kill Volume II composed of previously released solo songs in 2012, and also contributed to Necro's Murder Murder Kill Kill Double EP, before the release of their debut studio album Once Upon A Crime in 2013.

At the end of 2023, Necro, together with Ill Bill, released 2 singles “Blood Brothers” and “Madness” for the first joint album Blood Brothers, the release of which was initially scheduled for 2024.

On a July 21, 2024 Facebook post entitled ASK ME ANYTHING?!, a fan asked the following: "Are you and ILL BiLL gonna drop an album soon Madness my favorite track" Necro's response was, "NOPE - PROJECT IS DEADED."

== Studio albums ==
List of studio albums, with selected chart positions and information
Title	Album details	Peak chart positions		
Title	Album details	US R&B	US Indie	US Heat.
I Need Drugs	Released: November 7, 2000; Label: Psycho+Logical-Records (PSL 005)	—	—	—
Gory Days	Released: November 13, 2001; Label: Psycho+Logical-Records (PSL 0008)	—	—	—
The Pre-Fix for Death	Released: September 21, 2004; Label: Psycho+Logical-Records (PLR-0033)	—	—	—
The Sexorcist	Released: August 2, 2005; Label: Psycho+Logical-Records (PLR 0045)	—	—	—
Death Rap	Released: September 11, 2007; Label: Psycho+Logical-Records	—	43	13
DIE!	Released: May 18, 2010; Label: Psycho+Logical-Records (PLR-0060)	48	—	19
The Notorious Goriest	Released: November 30, 2018; Label: Psycho+Logical-Records (PLR 0110)	—	—	—
"—" denotes a recording that did not chart or was not released in that territory.

=== Collaborative albums ===
List of collaborative studio albums, with selected information
Title	Album details
The Circle Of Tyrants (with Ill Bill, Goretex & Mr. Hyde, as Circle Of Tyrants)	Released: September 13, 2005; Label: Psycho+Logical-Records (PLR 0046)
Once Upon A Crime (with Kool G Rap, as The Godfathers)	Released: November 19, 2013; Label: Psycho+Logical-Records (PLR-CD-456)

== Extended plays ==
Title	Details
Cockroaches EP	Released: 1998; Label: Uncle Howie Records
The Murder Murder Kill Kill Double EP	Released: July 31, 2012; Label: Psycho+Logical-Records (PLR 0066)
Absolut Horror	Released: 2023; Label: Psycho+Logical-Records (PLR-0141)
Pestilence EP	Released: 2023; Label: Psycho+Logical-Records (PLR-0142)

== Compilations ==
List of compilation albums, with selected information
Title	Album details
Rare Demos And Freestyles Volume 1	Released: May 1, 2001; Label: Psycho+Logical-Records
Rare Demos And Freestyles Vol. 2	Released: June 1, 2001; Label: Psycho+Logical-Records
Rare Demos & Freestyles Vol. 3	Released: January 7, 2003; Label: Psycho+Logical-Records (PLR 0013)
Brutality Part 1	Released: September 16, 2003; Label: Psycho+Logical-Records (PLR 0015)
The Pre-Kill Vol. 1 (with Kool G Rap)	Released: July 3, 2012; Label: Psycho+Logical-Records
The Pre-Kill Volume II (with Kool G Rap)	Released: July 3, 2012; Label: Psycho+Logical-Records
Metal Hiphop	Released: December 12, 2012; Label: Psycho+Logical-Records (PLR 0144)
Sadist Hitz	Released: December 16, 2014; Label: Psycho+Logical-Records (PLR-0083)
Sadist Hitz Volume 2	Released: March 13, 2020; Label: Psycho+Logical-Records
	Includes “New York Gangsters” ( featuring Tragedy Khadafi, Hec Teck, Capone, Dom Pachino, Thirstin Howl III, Raze The Ratchet, Willie Stubz, Chris Rivers, and Kurious Jorge)

=== Instrumentals ===
List of instrumental and a cappella albums, with selected information
Title	Album details
Instrumentals Vol. 1	Released: April 1, 2001; Label: Psycho+Logical-Records
Gory Days Instrumentals	Released: 2003; Label: Psycho+Logical-Records
The Pre-Fix For Death Acapellas	Released: 2004; Label: Psycho+Logical-Records
The Pre-Fix For Death Instrumentals	Released: 2005; Label: Psycho+Logical-Records (PLR-0039)
What's Wrong With Bill? Instrumentals	Released: 2005; Label: Psycho+Logical-Records (PLR-0040)
The Art Of Dying Instrumentals	Released: July 12, 2005; Label: Psycho+Logical-Records (PLR-0041)
Sabacolypse Instrumentals	Released: 2005; Label: Psycho+Logical-Records (PLR-0042)
Barn Of The Naked Dead Instrumentals	Released: 2005; Label: Psycho+Logical-Records (PLR-0043)
Brutality Part 1 Instrumentals	Released: 2005; Label: Psycho+Logical-Records (PLR-0044)
The Sexorcist: Cockapella Virgin	Released: 2005; Label: Psycho+Logical-Records
Death Rap Instrumentals	Released: 2007; Label: Psycho+Logical-Records
Murder Murder Kill Kill Instrumentals	Released: July 31, 2012; Label: Psycho+Logical-Records
Murder Murder Kill Kill Acapellas	Released: July 31, 2012; Label: Psycho+Logical-Records
DIE! Insertdamentalz	Released: July 31, 2012; Label: Psycho+Logical-Records
DIE! Acapellas	Released: July 31, 2012; Label: Psycho+Logical-Records
The Non Phixion Instrumentals	Released: 2012; Label: Psycho+Logical-Records
Once Upon a Crime Instrumentals	Released: October 5, 2018; Label: Psycho+Logical-Records
The Sexorcist Instrumentals	Released: October 22, 2018; Label: Psycho+Logical-Records
The Notorious Goriest Instrumentals	Released: December 28, 2018; Label: Psycho+Logical-Records
Instrumentals, Vol. 2	Released: July 5, 2024; Label: Psycho+Logical-Records

=== Demos ===
Title	Album details
The Cursed Earth (with Ill Bill & Mike Palmeri, as Injustice)	Released: 1989
Inhuman Conditions (with Ill Bill & Mike Palmeri, as Injustice)	Released: 1990

== Mixtapes ==
List of mixtape albums, with selected information
Title	Album details
Street Villains, Vol. 1 (with Ill Bill)	Released: July 3, 2003; Label: Psycho+Logical-Records
Street Villains Vol. 2 (with Ill Bill)	Released: July 4, 2005; Label: Psycho+Logical-Records (PLR-0038)
Blood Brothers (with Ill Bill)	Released: 2024; Label: Uncle Howie Records, Psycho+Logical-Records

== Box sets ==
Title	Album details
The Box Set, Vol. 1	Released: July 8, 2014; Label: Psycho+Logical-Records
The Box Set, Vol. 2	Released: July 8, 2014; Label: Psycho+Logical-Records

== Singles ==
Album title
"Murda Y'all"
- Released: September 16, 2013
- Label(s): Psycho+Logical-Records
"Heart Attack"
- Released: October 15, 2013
- Label(s): Psycho+Logical-Records
"Pop Ya Head Off"
- Released: December 2, 2014
- Label(s): Psycho+Logical-Records
"Smooth Crimy"
- Released: January 23, 2015
- Label(s): Psycho+Logical-Records
"Licinpusee"
- Released: August 28, 2015
- Label(s): Psycho+Logical-Records
"Take Hip-Hop Back"
- Released: October 23, 2015
- Label(s): Psycho+Logical-Records
"Los New Yorkangeles"
- Released: May 27, 2016
- Label(s): Psycho+Logical-Records
"Body Bag Material"
- Released: June 3, 2016
- Label(s): Psycho+Logical-Records
"Stories Of The Almost Dead"
- Released: September 29, 2017
- Label(s): Psycho+Logical-Records
"Gluteus Maximus"
- Released: December 1, 2017
- Label(s): Psycho+Logical-Records
"The Dawn Of A Dead Day"
- Released: June 22, 2018
- Label(s): Psycho+Logical-Records
"Grave Old World"
- Released: October 23, 2018
- Label(s): Psycho+Logical-Records
"The Master Of Ruckus"
- Released: November 2, 2018
- Label(s): Psycho+Logical-Records
"Know Con-Science"
- Released: November 9, 2018
- Label(s): Psycho+Logical-Records
"Murder Obscene"
- Released: November 23, 2018
- Label(s): Psycho+Logical-Records
"Head Neck Apartheid"
- Released: April 19, 2019
- Label(s): Psycho+Logical-Records
"The Love & Terror Cult"
- Released: May 3, 2019
- Label(s): Psycho+Logical-Records
"My Precious"
- Released: May 17, 2019
- Label(s): Psycho+Logical-Records
"Caught It!"
- Released: May 31, 2019
- Label(s): Psycho+Logical-Records
"Gat O' 9 Tales"
- Released: January 31, 2020
- Label(s): Psycho+Logical-Records
"What's This World Coming To?"
- Released: February 7, 2020
- Label(s): Psycho+Logical-Records
"Deaded"
- Released: February 14, 2020
- Label(s): Psycho+Logical-Records
"Party Killer"
- Released: February 21, 2020
- Label(s): Psycho+Logical-Records
"Blicky"
- Released: February 28, 2020
- Label(s): Psycho+Logical-Records
"Snitches Get Stitches"
- Released: March 6, 2020
- Label(s): Psycho+Logical-Records
"Shoot Dat Piece Of S***"
- Released: March 27, 2020
- Label(s): Psycho+Logical-Records
"Coronavirus Pandemic (Spreading the Disease)"
- Released: May 22, 2020
- Label(s): Psycho+Logical-Records
"Contagious"
- Released: May 29, 2020
- Label(s): Psycho+Logical-Records
"Covid-19 (Pestilence)"
- Released: September 4, 2020
- Label(s): Psycho+Logical-Records
"ACAB"
- Released: November 27, 2020
- Label(s): Psycho+Logical-Records
"Knife Season"
- Released: December 18, 2020
- Label(s): Psycho+Logical-Records
"After 12"
- Released: October 29, 2021
- Label(s): Psycho+Logical-Records
"Absolut Horror"
- Released: December 3, 2021
- Label(s): Psycho+Logical-Records
"Chop Into Your Body"
- Released: December 31, 2021
- Label(s): Psycho+Logical-Records
"Crazy!"
- Released: August 28, 2022
- Label(s): Psycho+Logical-Records
"Go Down South"
- Released: September 30, 2022
- Label(s): Psycho+Logical-Records
""Blood Brothers"
- Released: October 27, 2023
- Label(s): Psycho+Logical-Records
""Madness"
- Released: November 24, 2023
- Label(s): Psycho+Logical-Records
""The Streetest Taboo (Street Villains Collection)"
- Released: January 26, 2024
- Label(s): Psycho+Logical-Records
""All That She Wants Is Madness (Remix) (Street Villains Collection)"
- Released: February 9, 2024
- Label(s): Psycho+Logical-Records
"Outlaw"
- Released: February 23, 2024
- Label(s): Psycho+Logical-Records
"Cascading Crimson (The Metal Collection)"
- Released: March 15, 2024
- Label(s): Psycho+Logical-Records
"Break Teeth"
- Released: April 12, 2024
- Label(s): Psycho+Logical-Records
"Valley Intruder (The Metal Collection)"
- Released: May 3, 2024
- Label(s): Psycho+Logical-Records
"Jewish Gangsters"
- Released: May 24, 2024
- Label(s): Psycho+Logical-Records
"Adick (The Junkie Anthem) (The Metal Collection)"
- Released: June 14, 2024
- Label(s): Psycho+Logical-Records

== Guest appearances ==
- 1999: "Wise Ass" (Greedy Fingers featuring Necro)
- 1999: "Brutal Styles" (Greedy Fingers featuring Necro)
- 1998: "I Shot Reagan" (Non Phixion featuring Necro)
- 2002: "The Future Is Now" (Non Phixion featuring Necro)
- 2002: "Necrosadistic" (Hecate sampling parts from Necro's "The Most Sadistic")
- 2003: "Nothin" (Ill Bill featuring Necro)
- 2003: "Street Villains Freestyle 3" (Ill Bill featuring Necro and Q-Unique)
- 2003: "Street Villains Freestyle 4" (Ill Bill featuring Necro)
- 2003: "Yall Don't Wanna" (Ill Bill, Necro, Kid Joe and Uncle Howie)
- 2003: "Freestyle" (Q-Unique, Necro and Ill Bill)
- 2003: "Freestyle" (Ill Bill and Necro)
- 2003: "Dopesick" (Goretex featuring Necro)
- 2003: "Reign in Blood" (Ill Bill featuring Necro)
- 2003: "Street Veteran" (Mr. Hyde featuring Necro)
- 2003: "White Slavery" (Ill Bill featuring Necro)
- 2003: "Scumbags" (Goretex featuring Necro)
- 2003: "Frank Zito" (Ill Bill featuring Necro)
- 2003: "Our Life" (Ill Bill featuring Necro)
- 2004: "Glenwood Projects" (Ill Bill featuring Goretex, Necro and Uncle Howie)
- 2004: "Chasing the Dragon" (Ill Bill featuring Necro)
- 2004: "Canarsie Artie's Brigade" (Ill Bill featuring Goretex, Necro and Q-Unique)
- 2004: "89.9 Freestyle 1" (Non Phixion featuring Necro)
- 2004: "Positive & Negative" (Sabac featuring Necro)
- 2004: "P.O.W.'s" (Sabac featuring Goretex, Ill Bill, Mr. Hyde and Necro)
- 2004: "The Crazies" (Mr. Hyde featuring Goretex, Ill Bill and Necro)
- 2004: "Knife in Your Spine (Satanic Wordplay)" (Mr. Hyde featuring Necro)
- 2004: "Street Veteran Part 2" (Mr. Hyde featuring Necro)
- 2004: "Bums" (Mr. Hyde featuring Necro and Uncle Howie)
- 2004: "Them" (Mr. Hyde featuring Necro, Ill Bill and Goretex)
- 2004: "Canarsie Artie's Revenge" (Q-Unique featuring Goretex, Ill Bill and Necro)
- 2004: "Achtung!! Baby!!" (Raptile featuring Necro)
- 2004: "Blessed Are the Sick" (Goretex featuring Necro)
- 2004: "Pigmartyr" (Goretex featuring Necro)
- 2005: "Freestyle" (Ill Bill and Necro)
- 2005: "Still Not a Player" (Remix) (Big Pun featuring Necro and Joe)
- 2005: "Nasty Boy" (Remix) (Notorious B.I.G. featuring Necro)
- 2005: "Freestyle" (Goretex and Necro)
- 2005: "Freestyle" (Mr. Hyde and Necro)
- 2006: "Do It" (Chopper Read featuring Necro)
- 2007: "Take Em Home" (U-God featuring Necro)
- 2007: "Mechanix" (Danny Diablo featuring Necro, Skinhead Rob and Prince Metropolitan)
- 2008: "Fight Club" (Violent J featuring Esham and Necro, Produced by Mike E. Clark)
- 2008: "Braaains" (Mr. Hyde featuring Necro) Produced by Necro
- 2008: "Only Time Will Tell" (Ill Bill ft. Necro, Tech N9ne, and Everlast)
- 2008: "Desperados" (Riveria Regime featuring Necro and Danny Diablo, Produced by Necro)
- 2009: "Fight Club" (Violent J featuring Esham and Necro, Produced by Mike E. Clark)
- 2012 "Play With Me" (Gutta & Chris Carbene ft. Necro & Grim Moses)
- 2012 "Can't Hold Me" (Big Dave (rapper) ft. Necro and WC (rapper))
- 2013 "Dead in the Streets" (Psych Ward ft. Necro)

== Filmography ==
=== Singles ===
DVD title
Gory Days
- Released: October 28, 2002
- Label(s): Psycho+Logical-Records
Death Rap
- Released: September 11, 2007
- Label(s): Koch Records

=== Music videos ===
- 2000: "I Need Drugs" from I Need Drugs
- 2003: "White Slavery" from Brutality Part 1
- 2007: "The Pre-Fix for Death" from The Pre-Fix for Death (filmed in 2004, it was not released until 2007 where it was featured on a bonus DVD with Necro's fifth studio album)
- 2007: "Mutilate the Beat" from Death Rap
- 2008: "Who's Ya Daddy?" from The Sexorcist
- 2008: "I Wanna Fuck" from The Sexorcist
- 2009: "Human Trafficking" from Die!

=== Appearances in other artists' music videos ===
- 1999: "14 Years Of Rap" from Skeme Team
- 2002: "Rock Stars" from Non Phixion's The Future Is Now
- 2004: "Chasing the Dragon" from Ill Bill's What's Wrong with Bill?
- 2004: "A Change Gon' Come" from Sabac's A Change Gon' Come
- 2007: "Mechanix" from Danny Diablo's Thugcore 4 Life
- 2008: "Killer Collage" from Mr. Hyde's Chronicles Of The Beast Man

=== Directorial efforts ===
Film title
187 Reasonz Y
- Released: 1997
- Label(s): Necro Pictures
The Devil Made Me Do it
- Released: 1998
- Label(s): Necro Pictures
I Need Drugs Music Video
- Released: 2000
- Label(s): Necro Pictures
Sexy Sluts: Been There, Done That
- Released: September 16, 2003
- Label(s): Sexpert Video
