= 2004 in hip-hop =

This article summarizes the events, album releases, and album release dates in hip-hop for the year 2004.

== Released albums ==
Release date	Artist	Album	Label
January 20	Dizzee Rascal	Boy in da Corner	Bank Records
January 27	Twista	Kamikaze	Atlantic Records
February 3	Micranots	The Emperor & the Assassin	Rhymesayers Entertainment
February 3	Various Artists	Barbershop 2: Back in Business (soundtrack)	Interscope Records
February 10	Kanye West	The College Dropout	Roc-A-Fella Records, Def Jam Recordings
February 10	Del tha Funkee Homosapien	The Best of Del tha Funkee Homosapien: The Elektra Years	Rhino Entertainment, Elektra Records
February 10	Drag-On	Hell and Back	Ruff Ryders Entertainment, Virgin Records
February 24	Z-Ro	The Life of Joseph W. McVey	Rap-a-Lot Records
February 24	Royce da 5'9	Death is Certain	E1 Music
February 24	Trillville and Lil Scrappy	The King of Crunk & BME Recordings Present: Trillville & Lil Scrappy	Warner Bros. Records, Black Market Records, Warner Records, Reprise Records
February 24	Young Gunz	Tough Luv	Roc-A-Fella Records, Def Jam Recordings
March 1	Noah23 & Jaffa Gate	Ancient Israelites Older Than Anorthosite	Northstar Imprint
March 2	Cee-Lo Green	Cee-Lo Green... Is the Soul Machine	Arista Records
March 2	Beans	Now Soon Someday [EP]	
March 3	Tunnel Rats	Tunnel Rats	Uprok Records
March 9	Bad Boy Records	Bad Boy's 10th Anniversary... The Hits	Bad Boy Records
March 16	Clouddead	Ten	Big Dada, Mush Records
March 16	Cassidy	Split Personality	Full Surface Records, J Records
March 23	Blockhead	Music by Cavelight	Ninja Tune
March 23	Cypress Hill	Till Death Do Us Part	Columbia Records
March 23	Eyedea & Abilities	E&A	Rhymesayers Entertainment
March 23	Knoc-turn'al	The Way I Am	L.A. Confidential Records, Elektra Records
March 23	Madvillain	Madvillainy	Stones Throw Records
March 23	Master P	Good Side, Bad Side	The New No Limit Records, Koch Records
March 23	MURS & 9th Wonder	Murs 3:16 The 9th Edition	Definitive Jux
March 23	N*E*R*D	Fly or Die	Star Trak Entertainment, Virgin Records
March 23	Rap-a-Lot Records	The Day After Hell Broke Loose	Rap-a-Lot Records
March 23	Skatterman & Snug Brim	Urban Legendz	Strange Music
March 23	Various Artists	Never Die Alone (soundtrack)	Warner Bros. Records
March 30	Lil Flip	U Gotta Feel Me	Sucka Free Records, Clover G Records, Columbia Records, Sony Urban Music
April 6	Dark Lotus	Black Rain	Psychopathic Records
April 6	Dilated Peoples	Neighborhood Watch	Capitol Records
April 6	J-Kwon	Hood Hop	So So Def Recordings, Arista Records, Sony Music Entertainment
April 6	Non Phixion	The Green CD/DVD	Uncle Howie Records
April 13	Illogic	Celestial Clockwork	Weightless Recordings
April 13	Plague Language	Farewell Archetypes	Legendary Entertainment, Plague Language
April 20	Automato	Automato	
April 20	Ghostface Killah	The Pretty Toney Album	Def Jam Recordings
April 27	D12	D12 World	Shady Records, Interscope Records
May 4	Ill Bill	What's Wrong with Bill?	Psycho+Logical-Records
May 4	Petey Pablo	Still Writing in My Diary: 2nd Entry	Jive Records
May 4	Various Artists	United Ghettos of America Vol. 2	Smoke-a-Lot Records, Rap-a-Lot Records
May 11	8Ball & MJG	Living Legends	Bad Boy South, Universal Music Group
May 11	Gift of Gab	4th Dimensional Rocketships Going Up	Quannum Projects
May 11	MF Grimm	Special Herbs + Spices Volume 1	Day by Day Entertainment
May 11	Pete Rock	Soul Survivor II	BBE Records
May 18	Method Man	Tical 0: The Prequel	Def Jam Recordings
May 18	The Streets	A Grand Don't Come for Free	
May 18	Various Artists	The Third Unheard: Connecticut Hip Hop 1979–1983	Stones Throw Records
May 18	Twiztid	Cryptic Collection Vol. 3	Psychopathic Records
May 18	UTP	The Beginning of the End	Rap-A-Lot Records, UTP Records
May 20	Lecrae	Real Talk	Reach Records
May 25	M.O.P.	Mash Out Posse	Fast Life Music, Inc.
May 28	Various Artists	Soul Plane	Various Records
June 1	Masta Killa	No Said Date	Nature Sounds
June 8	The X-Ecutioners	The Revolutions	Sony Music
June 8	De La Soul	De La Mix Tape: Remixes, Rarities and Classics	
June 8	Spice 1	The Ridah	
June 15	Beastie Boys	To the 5 Boroughs	Capitol Records
June 15	Proof	I Miss the Hip Hop Shop	Iron Fist Records
June 15	Sabac Red	Sabacolypse: A Change Gon' Come	Psycho+Logical-Records
June 22	Erick Sermon	Chilltown, New York	Motown Records
June 22	Jadakiss	Kiss of Death	Ruff Ryders Entertainment, Interscope Records
June 22	Phat Kat	The Undeniable LP	Barak Records
June 27	Noah23	Sigma Octantis	Legendary Entertainment, Plague Language
June 27	Noah23	Mitochondrial Blues	Legendary Entertainment, Plague Language
June 29	Akon	Trouble	SRC Records, UpFront Megatainment, Universal Music Group
June 29	Goodie Mob	One Monkey Don't Stop No Show	Koch Records
June 29	Headset	Space Settings	
June 29	Various Artists	The Source Presents: Hip Hop Hits, Vol. 8	Image Entertainment
June 29	Lloyd Banks	The Hunger For More	G-Unit Records, Interscope Records
June 29	Slum Village	Detroit Deli: A Taste of Detroit	Capitol Records
June 29	Lil Wayne	Tha Carter	Cash Money Records
July 13	Leak Bros.	Waterworld	Eastern Conference Records
July 13	The Pharcyde	Humboldt Beginnings	
July 13	Project: Deadman	Self Inflicted	Strange Music
July 13	The Roots	The Tipping Point	Geffen Records
July 13	7L & Esoteric	DC2: Bars of Death	Babygrande Records
July 27	Anybody Killa	Dirty History	Psychopathic Records
July 27	Bigg Jus	Black Mamba Serums v2.0	Big Dada
July 27	OuterSpace	Blood and Ashes	Babygrande Records
July 27	Terror Squad	True Story	Terror Squad Productions, SRC Records, Universal Records
August 3	Body Head Bangerz	Body Head Bangerz, Vol. 1	Body Head Entertainment, Universal Records
August 3	Masta Ace	A Long Hot Summer	M3 Records
August 3	MF Doom	VV:2	Insomniac, Inc.
August 3	Theodore Unit	718	
August 10	Brand Nubian	Fire in the Hole	Babygrande Records
August 10	Kutt Calhoun	B.L.E.V.E.	Strange Music
August 10	Mobb Deep	Amerikaz Nightmare	Jive Records
August 10	Mr. Hyde	Barn of the Naked Dead	Psycho+Logical-Records
August 10	Mystikal	Prince of the South... The Hits	Jive Records
August 10	Shyne	Godfather Buried Alive	Def Jam Recordings
August 10	Suburban Noize Records	The Royal Family	Suburban Noize Records
August 17	Northern State	All City	
August 17	213	The Hard Way	Doggystyle Records, G-Funk Entertainment, Dogg Foundation, TVT Records
August 24	E-40	The Best of E-40: Yesterday, Today & Tomorrow	Sick Wid It Records, Jive Records
August 24	The Foreign Exchange	Connected	Barely Breaking Even
August 24	Jedi Mind Tricks	Legacy of Blood	Babygrande Records
August 24	Jim Jones	On My Way to Church	Diplomat Records, Koch Records
August 24	Ma$e	Welcome Back	Bad Boy Entertainment
August 24	MC Breed	The New Prescription	Psychopathic Records
August 24	Pitbull	M.I.A.M.I.	TVT Records
August 24	Young Buck	Straight Outta Ca$hville	G-Unit Records, Interscope Records
August 31	Insane Clown Posse	The Wraith: Hell's Pit	Psychopathic Records
August 31	LL Cool J	The DEFinition	Def Jam Recordings
September 7	Rob Sonic	Telicatessen	Definitive Jux
September 7	Silkk the Shocker	Based on a True Story	The New No Limit Records, Koch Records
September 14	Dem Franchize Boyz	Dem Franchize Boyz	Universal Records
September 14	Dizzee Rascal	Showtime	
September 14	Nelly	Sweat	Derrty Entertainment, Universal Records
September 14	Nelly	Suit	Derrty Entertainment, Universal Records
September 21	Jean Grae	This Week	Babygrande Records
September 21	k-os	Joyful Rebellion	
September 21	Lil' Romeo	Romeoland	The New No Limit Records, Koch Records
September 21	Necro	The Pre-Fix for Death	Psycho+Logical-Records
September 21	Saul Williams	Saul Williams	Fader Label
September 21	The Alchemist	1st Infantry	ALC, Koch Records
September 21	Various Artists	Shark Tale: Motion Picture Soundtrack	Geffen Records, DreamWorks Records, UMG Soundtracks
September 28	Heiruspecs	A Tiger Dancing	
September 28	Shawnna	Worth tha Weight	Disturbing tha Peace, Def Jam Recordings
September 28	Guerilla Black	Guerilla City	Virgin Records
September 28	Talib Kweli	The Beautiful Struggle	Rawkus Records
October 5	De La Soul	The Grind Date	AOI Records
October 5	The Game	Untold Story	Get Low Recordz
October 5	I-20	Self Explanatory	Disturbing tha Peace, Capitol Records
October 12	Busta Rhymes	The Artist Collection: Busta Rhymes	BMG International
October 12	Gold Chains And Curly Cie	When The World Was Our Friend	
October 12	Mos Def	The New Danger	Rawkus Records, Geffen Records
October 19	Beans	Shock City Maverick	
October 19	Bizzy Bone	Alpha and Omega	
October 19	Blaze Ya Dead Homie	Colton Grundy: The Undying	Psychopathic Records
October 19	Jin	The Rest is History	Ruff Ryders Entertainment, Virgin Records
October 19	Juvenile	The Greatest Hits	Cash Money Records, Universal Records
October 19	Lil Wyte	Phinally Phamous	Hypnotize Minds Productions
October 19	Q-Unique	Vengeance Is Mine	Uncle Howie Records
October 26	Afrika Bambaataa	Dark Matter Moving at the Speed of Light	Tommy Boy Records
October 26	Goretex	The Art of Dying	Psycho+Logical-Records
October 26	Lateef & the Chief	Maroons: Ambush	Quannum Projects
October 26	Jay-Z & R. Kelly	Unfinished Business	Roc-A-Fella Records, Def Jam Recordings, Jive Records, Rockland Records
October 26	Trick Daddy	Thug Matrimony: Married to the Streets	Atlantic Records
October 26	Wu-Tang Clan	Legend of the Wu-Tang: Wu-Tang Clan's Greatest Hits	BMG Heritage Records
November 1	Noah23	Jupiter Sajitarius	2nd Rec
November 2	Ying Yang Twins	My Brother & Me	TVT Records
November 9	Ed O.G.	My Own Worst Enemy	
November 9	Fabolous	Real Talk	Desert Storm Records, Atlantic Records
November 9	Handsome Boy Modeling School	White People	Elektra Records
November 9	Ja Rule	R.U.L.E.	Murder Inc. Records, Def Jam Recordings
November 12	Eminem	Encore	Shady Records, Aftermath Entertainment, Interscope Records, Web Entertainment
November 16	Bone Thugs-n-Harmony	Greatest Hits	Ruthless Records
November 16	Chingy	Powerballin'	Full Dekk Music Group, Capitol Records
November 16	Lil Jon & The East Side Boyz	Crunk Juice	BME Recordings, TVT Records
November 16	MF Doom	Mm..Food	Rhymesayers Entertainment
November 16	Monoxide Child	Chainsmoker LP	Psychopathic Records
November 16	R.A. the Rugged Man	Die, Rugged Man, Die	Nature Sounds
November 16	Snoop Dogg	R&G (Rhythm & Gangsta): The Masterpiece	Doggystyle Records, Star Trak Entertainment, Geffen Records
November 23	Apathy	Where's Your Album?!!	
November 23	Axe Murder Boyz	The Unforgiven Forest	Canonize Productions
November 23	The Diplomats	Diplomatic Immunity 2	Diplomat Records, Koch Records
November 23	UTP	Nolia Clap (EP)	Rap-A-Lot Records, UTP Records
November 23	Various Artists	Blade: Trinity (soundtrack)	New Line Records
November 30	Nas	Street's Disciple	Ill Will Records, Columbia Records
November 30	T.I.	Urban Legend	Grand Hustle Records, Atlantic Records
December 7	Cam'ron	Purple Haze	Roc-A-Fella Records, Diplomat Records, Def Jam Recordings
December 7	Ludacris	The Red Light District	Disturbing tha Peace, Def Jam Recordings
December 7	Various Artists	The Source Presents: Hip Hop Hits, Vol. 9	Image Entertainment
December 7	Yung Wun	The Dirtiest Thirstiest	Full Surface Records, J Records
December 14	Xzibit	Weapons of Mass Destruction	Open Bar Entertainment, Columbia Records, Sony Music
December 14	2Pac	Loyal to the Game	Amaru Entertainment, Interscope Records
December 21	Mannie Fresh	The Mind of Mannie Fresh	Cash Money Records, Universal Records

== Highest-charting singles ==
Hip hop singles from any year which charted in the 2004 Top 40 of the Billboard Hot 100
Song	Artist	Project	Peak position
"Slow Jamz"	Twista & Kanye West featuring Jamie Foxx	Kamikaze and The College Dropout	1
"Lean Back"	Terror Squad featuring Fat Joe & Remy Ma	True Story	1
"Drop It Like It's Hot"	Snoop Dogg featuring Pharrell Williams	R&G: The Masterpiece	1
"The Way You Move"	OutKast featuring Sleepy Brown	Speakerboxxx/The Love Below	1
"Slow Motion"	Juvenile featuring Soulja Slim	Juve the Great	1
"Tipsy"	J-Kwon	Hood Hop	2
"Over and Over"	Nelly featuring Tim McGraw	Suit	3
"My Place"	Nelly featuring Jaheim	Suit	4
"Dirt off Your Shoulder"	Jay-Z	The Black Album	5
"Just Lose It"	Eminem	Encore	6
"My Band"	D12	D-12 World	6
"Overnight Celebrity"	Twista	Kamikaze	6
"All Falls Down"	Kanye West featuring Syleena Johnson	The College Dropout	7
"Let's Go"	Trick Daddy featuring Lil Jon & Twista	Thug Matrimony: Married to the Streets	7
"On Fire"	Lloyd Banks featuring 50 Cent	The Hunger For More	8
"Roses"	OutKast	Speakerboxxx/The Love Below	9
"Breathe"	Fabolous	Real Talk	10
"Jesus Walks"	Kanye West	The College Dropout	11
"Why?"	Jadakiss featuring Anthony Hamilton	Kiss of Death	11
"Go D.J."	Lil Wayne	Tha Carter	14
"Through The Wire"	Kanye West	The College Dropout	15
"Headsprung"	LL Cool J	The DEFinition	16
"Shorty Wanna Ride"	Young Buck	Straight Outta Cashville	17
"U Make Me Wanna"	Jadakiss featuring Mariah Carey	Kiss of Death	21
"Gigolo"	Nick Cannon featuring R. Kelly	Nick Cannon	24
"Encore"	Eminem featuring Dr. Dre & 50 Cent	Encore	25
"So Sexy"	Twista featuring R. Kelly	Kamikaze	25
"Hush"	LL Cool J featuring 7 Aurelius	The DEFinition	26
"How Come"	D12	D-12 World	27
"Breathe, Stretch, Shake"	Mase featuring P. Diddy	Welcome Back	28
"99 Problems"	Jay-Z	The Black Album	30
"Rubber Band Man"	T.I.	Trap Muzik	30
"What's Happ'nin!"	Ying Yang Twins featuring Trick Daddy	Me & My Brother	30
"Nolia Clap"	UTP	The Beginning of the End....	31
"Welcome Back"	Mase	Welcome Back	32
"Gangsta Nation"	Westside Connection featuring Nate Dogg	Terrorist Threats	33
"Let Me In"	Young Buck featuring 50 Cent	Straight Outta Cashville	34
"Let's Get Away"	T.I. featuring Jazze Pha	Trap Muzik	35
"I Can't Wait"	Sleepy Brown featuring OutKast	Barbershop 2: Back in Business (soundtrack)	40

== Highest first-week sales ==
List of top ten albums released in 2004, according to first-week home market sales.
Number	Album	Artist	1st-week sales	1st-week position
1	Encore	Eminem	710,000	1
2	D12 World	D12	544,000	1
3	The College Dropout	Kanye West	441,000	2
4	The Hunger for More	Lloyd Banks	433,000	1
5	Suit	Nelly	396,000	1
6	Crunk Juice	Lil Jon & the Eastside Boyz	363,000	3
7	To the 5 Boroughs	Beastie Boys	360,000	1
8	Sweat	Nelly	342,000	2
9	Loyal to the Game	2Pac	330,000	1
10	The Red Light District	Ludacris	322,000	1

== Highest critically reviewed albums (Metacritic) ==
Number	Artist	Album	Average score	Number of reviews	Reference
1	Madvillain	Madvillainy	93	20 reviews	
2	Dizzee Rascal	Boy In Da Corner	92	28 reviews	
3	The Streets	A Grand Don't Come For Free	91	30 reviews	
4	Dizzee Rascal	Showtime	87	28 reviews	
5	Kanye West	The College Dropout	87	25 reviews	
6	Cee-Lo Green	Cee-Lo Green Is The Soul Machine	86	19 reviews	
7	MF Doom	Mm..Food	81	22 reviews	
8	De La Soul	The Grind Date	80	21 reviews	
9	Nas	Street's Disciple	80	16 reviews	
10	Masta Ace	A Long Hot Summer	78	10 reviews	

== See also ==
- Previous article: 2003 in hip-hop
- Next article: 2005 in hip-hop
