= Necro production discography =

This is the production discography of hip-hop artist Necro.

== Al Tariq ==
- 2000: The Artist Formerly Known As Fashion ("Feel This Shit", "Black Nasty Muthafucka")

== Cage ==
- 1992: "Just Like Clockwork"
- 1997: "Radiohead"
- 1997: "Agent Orange"
- 2002: Movies for the Blind ("Agent Orange" - slightly edited)

== Captain Carnage ==
- 1994: "Destined To Die"
- 2005: "Freestyle"

== The Circle of Tyrants (Necro, Ill Bill, Goretex, Mr. Hyde, Captain Carnage) ==
- 2005: The Circle of Tyrants (All Tracks)

== Exlib ==
- 2001: Pandora's Box ("Feed Your Head")

== Goretex ==
- 1995: "Gettin Dusted"
- 2004: The Art of Dying (All Tracks)
- 2004: The Art of Dying Instrumentals

== Ill Bill ==
- 2003: Howie Made Me Do It ("Gangsta Rap", "How to Kill a Cop")
- 2004: What's Wrong with Bill? (All Tracks)
- 2004: What's Wrong with Bill? Instrumentals
- 2005: Psycho+Logical/Uncle Howie Records 2005 Sampler ("The Revolution Will Be Classified", "Paradise Ranch" - unfinished Secret Society tracks)
- 2006: Ill Bill Is The Future 2: I'm A Goon ("Focus On Bill")
- 2008: The Hour of Reprisal ("UBS (Unauthorized Biography Of Slayer)", "The Most Dangerous Weapon Alive")

== Injustice ==
- 1990: "Necrosphere", "Wisdom Of The Subgenius", "Ascend To Obscurity"

== Mark "Chopper" Read ==
- 2006: Interview with a Madman ("Do It")

== Missin' Linx ==
- 1998: "Locked Down"
- 2000: Exhibit A ("What it Is")

== Mr. Hyde ==
- 2004: Barn of the Naked Dead (all tracks)
- 2004: Barn of the Naked Dead Instrumentals
- 2007: Rare Demos & Freestyles, Vol. 1 ("Feed Your Head", "Demonic Harmonix")
- 2008: Chronicles of the Beast Man ("Braaains", "Street Veteran, Pt. 3")
- 2016: Evil Never Dies ("Gruesome Twosome Tuesday", "Unholy Carnage")
- 2019: The Boogeyman Is Real ("The Boot")

== Mr. Muthafuckin' eXquire ==
- 2011: Lost In Translation ("Huzzah!", "The Last Huzzah! (Remix)")

== Necro ==
- 1992: "Fresh Death", "Wreck The Rectum"
- 1993: "One for the Butcherknife", "Do The Charles Manson"
- 1994: "Blunt On The Topic Of The Stunt", "Garbage Bag", "Sex With Female Rednecks", "Butcher Knife", "Raped Infants", "Eat Shit And Die", "Butcher Knife Gat", "Snails In Your Entrails", "Guilty Til Proven Innocent", "What Ya Gonna Do"
- 1995: "Robbery", "Dedicated To The Trife"
- 1990: Inhuman Conditions (Single)
- 1997: Get On Your Knees/Underground (Single)
- 1998: Cockroaches (Single)
- 1999: The Most Sadistic/You're Dead (Single)
- 1999: Your F****** Head Split/Rugged S*** (Single)
- 2000: I Need Drugs
- 2000: I Need Drugs (Single)
- 2000: Bury You With Satan/World Gone Mad (Single)
- 2000: Gory Days
- 2001: Gory Days (Instrumentals)
- 2001: Instrumentals, Vol. 1
- 2001: Rare Demos & Freestyles, Vol. 1
- 2001: Rare Demos & Freestyles, Vol. 2
- 2003: Brutality, Pt. 1
- 2003: Rare Demos & Freestyles, Vol. 3
- 2003: Street Villains, Vol. 1
- 2004: The Pre-Fix For Death
- 2004: The Pre-Fix For Death (Acapellas)
- 2005: The Art Of Dying (Instrumentals)
- 2005: Barn Of The Naked Dead (Instrumentals)
- 2005: Brutality, Pt. 1 (Instrumentals)
- 2005: The Circle Of Tyrants
- 2005: The Pre-Fix For Death (Instrumentals)
- 2005: Sabacolypse (Instrumentals)
- 2005: The Sexorcist
- 2005: The Sexorcist (Acapellas)
- 2005: Street Villains, Vol. 2
- 2005: What's Wrong With Bill? (Instrumentals)
- 2005: Who's Ya Daddy?/P**** Is My Weakness (Single)
- 2007: Death Rap
- 2007: Death Rap (Instrumentals)
- 2010: Die!
- 2010: Die! (Acapellas)
- 2010: Die! (Instrumentals)
- 2012: Metal Hip-Hop
- 2012: Murder Murder Kill Kill
- 2012: Murder Murder Kill Kill (Acapellas)
- 2012: Murder Murder Kill Kill (Instrumentals)
- 2012: The Non Phixion Instrumentals
- 2012: The Pre-Kill, Vol. 1 (Even Tracks)
- 2012: The Pre-Kill, Vol. 2 (Even Tracks)
- 2013: Heart Attack (Single)
- 2013: Murda Y'all (Single)
- 2013: Once Upon A Crime
- 2014: The Box Set, Vol. 1
- 2014: The Box Set, Vol. 2
- 2014: Pop Ya Head Off (Single)
- 2014: Sadist Hitz, Vol. 1
- 2015: Licinpusee (Single)
- 2015: Smooth Crimy (Single))
- 2015: Take Hip-Hop Back (Single)
- 2016: Body Bag Material (Single)
- 2016: F*** Commercial Rap (Single)
- 2016: Los New Yorkangeles (Single)
- 2017: Gluteus Maximus (Single)
- 2017: Stories Of The Almost Dead (Single)
- 2018: The Dawn Of A Dead Day (Single)
- 2018: Grave Old World (Single)
- 2018: Know Con-Science (Single)
- 2018: The Master Of Ruckus (Single)
- 2018: Murder Obscene (Single)
- 2018: The Notorious Goriest
- 2018: The Notorious Goriest (Instrumentals)
- 2018: Once Upon A Crime (Instrumentals)
- 2018: The Sexorcist (Instrumentals)
- 2019: Caught It! (Single)
- 2019: Head Neck Apartheid (Single)
- 2019: The Love & Terror Cult (Single)
- 2019: My Precious (Single)
- 2020: ACAB (Single)
- 2020: Blicky (Single)
- 2020: Contagious (Single)
- 2020: Coronavirus Pandemic (Spreading The Disease) (Single)
- 2020: Covid-19 (Pestilence) (Single)
- 2020: Deaded (Single)
- 2020: Gat O' 9 Tales (Single)
- 2020: Knife Season (Single)
- 2020: Party Killer (Single)
- 2020: Sadist Hitz, Vol. 2
- 2020: Shoot Dat Piece Of S*** (Single)
- 2020: Snitches Get Stitches (Single)
- 2020: What's This World Coming To? (Single)
- 2021: Absolut Horror (Single)
- 2021: After 12 (Single)
- 2021: Chop Into Your Body (Single)
- 2022: Crazy! (Single)
- 2022: Go Down South (Single)
- 2023: Blood Brothers (Single)
- 2023: Madness (Single)
- 2024: Adick (The Junkie Anthem) (The Metal Collection) (Single)
- 2024: All That She Wants Is Madness (Street Villains Collection) (Single)
- 2024: Break Teeth (Single)
- 2024: Cascading Crimson (The Metal Collection) (Single)
- 2024: Instrumentals, Vol. 2
- 2024: Jewish Gangsters (Single)
- 2024: Outlaw (Single)
- 2024: The Sexorcist (The Ultimate Porn Collection)
- 2024: The Streetest Taboo (Street Villains Collection) (Single)
- 2024: Valley Intruder (The Metal Collection) (Single)
- 2025: You Already Know (Single)

== Non Phixion ==
- 1995: "Revolutionize", "War Is Everywhere", "Spaces Around Me",
- 1996: "No Tomorrow"
- 1997: "5 Boros"
- 1998: "I Shot Reagan", "Refuse To Lose"
- 2002: The Future Is Now ("Futurama", "The C.I.A. Is Trying To Kill Me", "There Is No Future", "Say Goodbye To Yesterday", "Black Helicopters", "Strange Universe", "The C.I.A. Is Still Trying To Kill Me")
- 2003: "Say Goodbye To Yesterday (Remix)" (from Biker Boyz Soundtrack)
- 2004: "This Is Not An Exercise"
- 2004: The Green CD/DVD ("The Freshfest", "Criminal", "Refuse to Lose")
- 2005: "The Plague" (from the never-released album Nuclear Truth - left unfinished after Non Phixion disbanded)

== Q-Unique ==
- 2004: Vengeance Is Mine ("The Set Up", "The Ugly Place", "Canarsie Artie's Revenge", "Father's Day", "Psychological Warfare")
- 2010: Between Heaven & Hell ("Between Heaven & Hell Prologue")

== Raekwon ==
- 2009: Only Built 4 Cuban Linx II ("Gihad")

== Riviera Regime ==
- 2008: Real Soldierz Ride ("Golani Brigade")

== Sabac Red ==
- 2004: Sabacolypse: A Change Gon' Come (All Tracks)
- 2004: Sabacolypse: A Change Gon' Come Instrumentals

== Troy Dunnit ==
- 2003: Rugged Radio Saturday ("Not Gangsta")
