= Brutality Part 1 =

Compilation album by Necro
- Released: September 16, 2003
- Genre: Horrorcore
- Length: 59:20
- Label: Psycho+Logical-Records
- Producer: Necro

Necro chronology
Gory Days (2001)	Brutality Part 1 (2003)	The Pre-Fix for Death (2004)

Singles from Brutality Part 1
- 1. "Fire / White Slavery" Released: 2003

Professional ratings
Review scores
Source	Rating
AllHipHop	3/5
HipHopDX	3.5/5
Now	2/5 Ns
RapReviews	7.5/10

Brutality Part 1 is a compilation album by American rapper and record producer Necro. It was released on September 16, 2003, via Psycho+Logical-Records. Produced entirely by Necro, it features contributions from Ill Bill, Goretex and Mr. Hyde.

== Track listing ==
No.	Title	Writer(s)	Length
1.	"I'm Your Idol"	Ron Braunstein	4:15
2.	"Dopesick"	Mitchell Manzanilla; R. Braunstein	3:43
3.	"Reign in Blood"	William Braunstein; R. Braunstein	4:07
4.	"Street Veteran"	Christopher Catenacci; R. Braunstein	4:55
5.	"Swordfish"	W. Braunstein	4:04
6.	"Anguish & Agression"	R. Braunstein	2:37
7.	"The Big Sleep"	Manzanilla	3:36
8.	"White Slavery"	R. Braunstein; W. Braunstein	3:57
9.	"Scumbags"	Manzanilla; R. Braunstein	3:29
10.	"Frank Zito"	R. Braunstein; W. Braunstein	2:52
11.	"Our Life"	W. Braunstein; R. Braunstein	3:21
12.	"Morbid Shit"	R. Braunstein	2:50
13.	"Every Second Someone Dies"	R. Braunstein	3:20
14.	"Fire"	R. Braunstein	3:02
15.	"Talking Shit"	R. Braunstein	3:30
16.	"Watch Ya Toes"	R. Braunstein	2:02
17.	"The Big Sleep" (Remix)	Manzanilla	3:40
Total length:			59:20

== Personnel ==
- Ron "Necro" Braunstein – vocals (tracks: 1–4, 6, 8–16), producer, mixing, executive producer
- Mitchell "Goretex" Manzanilla – vocals (tracks: 2, 7, 9, 17)
- William "Ill Bill" Braunstein – vocals (tracks: 3, 5, 8, 10, 11)
- Christopher "Mr. Hyde" Catenacci – vocals (track 4)
- John "Sabac Red" Fuentes – mixing
- Duncan Stanbury – mastering
