= The Early Years: Rare Demos '91–'94 =

The Early Years: Rare Demos '91-'94

Compilation album by Ill Bill
- Released: September 16, 2001
- Recorded: 1991 – 1994
- Genre: underground hip hop
- Length: 53:10
- Label: Psycho+Logical-Records
- Producer: Necro, B-Wiz, 10K, Joe Fatal

Ill Bill chronology
The Early Years: Rare Demos '91-'94 (2001)	Howie Made Me Do it (2003)

The Early Years: Rare Demos '91–'94 is the first rarities compilation by American hip hop musician Ill Bill, released on September 16, 2001 by Psycho+Logical-Records.

The compilation contains 12 demos, an intro, two skits and one remix. Featured guests on the compilation include Goretex and Gongo Boy.

"Peep the Zoobaz" was also remixed for this release.

== Track listing ==
1. "Intro" – 1:58
2. "Murder" – 4:33
3. "I'm Not Happy" – 3:36
4. "Bacardi and Acid" (featuring Goretex and Gongo Boy) – 2:58
5. "Economics" – 2:12
6. "Peep the Zoobaz" (featuring Goretex) – 3:26
7. "Junkies wit Gunz" (featuring Goretex) – 4:31
8. "Eat My Ass" – 3:52
9. "Dope Fiend" – 3:44
10. "Brooklyn Bonanza" – 4:48
11. "Run for Your Life" – 4:21
12. "Out to Lunch" (featuring Goretex) – 4:42
13. "Pussy" (Skit) – 0:43
14. "Orgy of the Damned" – 3:44
15. "What I Do" (Skit) – 1:11
16. "Peep the Zoobaz" (Remix) (featuring Goretex) – 2:43
- The "Pussy" skit samples Cheech Marin's speech from the 1996 action/horror film From Dusk till Dawn.
- The "How to Kill a Cop" skit samples a scene from Quentin Tarantino's 1992 action/drama film Reservoir Dogs.
- The track "Junkiez wit Gunz"" samples dialogue from the movie Don't Be a Menace to South Central While Drinking Your Juice in the Hood.
- The track "Economics" has Boiler Room dialogue mixed in the song for the release.
- The track "Peep The Zoobaz" samples dialogue from the movie Bad Lieutenant
- The track "Peep the Zoobaz" (Remix) samples the instrumental from the song Ever So Clear by Bushwick Bill.

== Personnel ==
- Ill Bill – vocals, composing, writing
- Necro – production
- Goretex – guest vocals
- Fatal - production ("Dope Fiend")
- 10K - production
- B-Wiz - production
- Gongo Boy – guest vocals
