= Push It to the Limit =

Push It to the Limit may refer to:

- "Scarface (Push It to the Limit)", a 1983 song written by Giorgio Moroder and performed by Paul Engemann
- "Push It to the Limit" (Corbin Bleu song), a 2006 song by Corbin Bleu
- "Push It to the Limit", a song by Necro from The Pre-Fix for Death
- "Push It 2 the Limit", a song by Daz Dillinger and Fratthouse from Get That Paper
