= Bernie Friedkin =

American boxer (1917–2007)

Bernie "Schoolboy" Friedkin (July 10, 1917 – January 18, 2007) was an American lightweight boxer who fought professionally from 1935 to 1941.

Friedkin was one of Morris and Bessie Friedkin's seven children. He grew up in the Brownsville section of Brooklyn, which was then predominantly Jewish. During that era Brownsville was a rough and tumble neighborhood. At the time Friedkin was growing up, boxing was popular among Jewish American boys from poor families like Friedkin's. The 5' 6" Friedkin took up boxing. As a boy, Friedkin learned to read by concentrating on Ring magazine; he also set up a makeshift boxing ring in his basement.

Starting as a featherweight at 126 pounds, Friedkin bulked up to 135 pounds to become a lightweight. He had success as a lightweight in the late 1930s and the early 1940s. His small stature and youngish face led to his being labeled Bernie "Schoolboy" Friedkin. He may be most remembered for a fight on March 9, 1937, in front of 5,000 fans at the Broadway Arena in Brooklyn. In the eight-round main event, Friedkin fought Kid Chocolate, the former world featherweight champion, to a draw. The draw surprised the fans and resulted in booing. His record was 48 wins, 9 losses, and, unually, 11 draws. Friedkin died on January 18, 2007, and was survived by his wife of 60 years, Leonore Bennett, and their two daughters. They lived for many years in the Glenwood Houses in Brooklyn.
