= Once upon a Crime =

Once upon a Crime may refer to:

- Once upon a Crime (1992 film), 1992 American black comedy mystery film
- Once upon a Crime (2023 film), 2023 Japanese fantasy film
- Once Upon a Crime (album), 2013 debut album by The Godfathers
- Once Upon a Crime (novel), 2007 novel by Michael Buckley
- Elize Matsunaga: Once Upon a Crime, 2021 Netflix docuseries about the murder of Marcos Matsunaga
- "Once Upon a Crime", 1988 episode of Alvin and the Chipmunks (1983)
