= Non Phixion =

American hip hop group

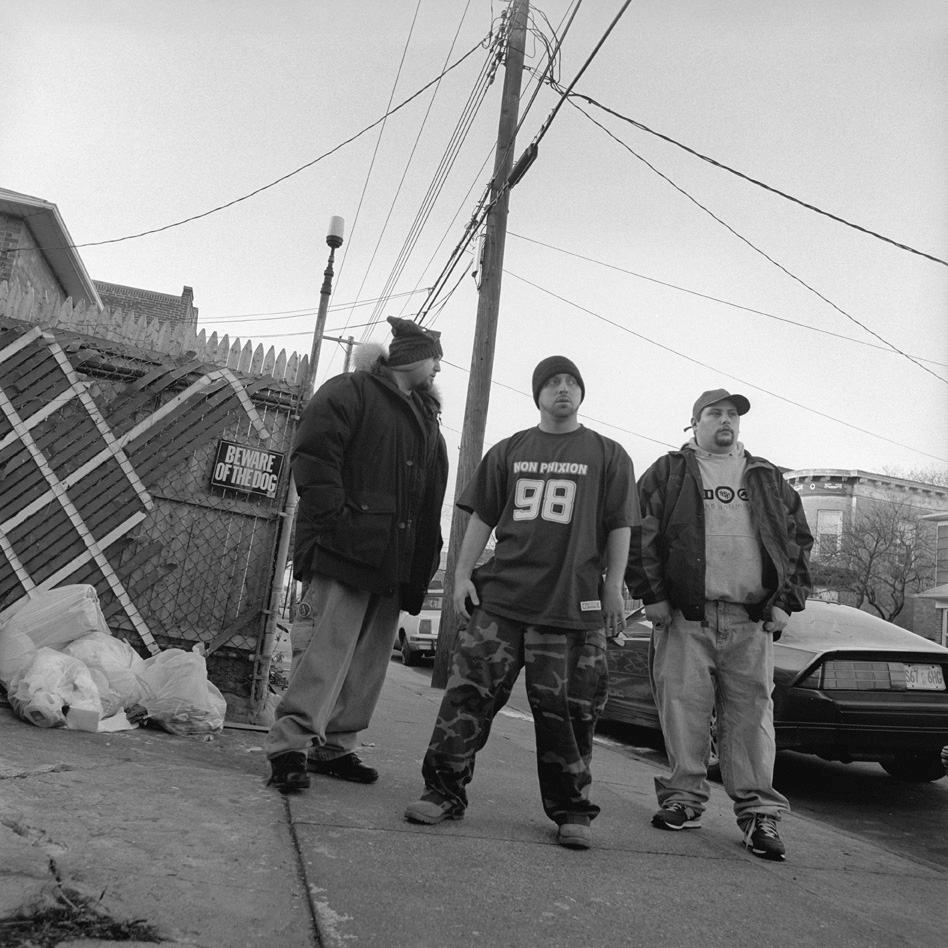
- Non Phixion in 1998

Background information
- Origin: New York City, U.S.
- Genres: Underground hip-hop; hardcore hip-hop; political hip hop
- Years active: 1995–2006, 2014–present
- Labels: Uncle Howie, Matador, Geffen, Landspeed
- Members: Ill Bill; Sabac Red; Goretex; DJ Eclipse
- Past members: MC Serch; Necro

Non Phixion (pronounced Non-Fiction) is an American hip-hop group from Brooklyn, New York City. Though the group did not become a household name during their initial period of activity, the Village Voice said Non Phixion was "integral to the timeline of underground hip-hop." The group endured a series of missed opportunities on their way to their only LP release and broke up after their first decade. In the months leading up to the 20th anniversary of their formation, the group reunited and as of 2021 was still active and touring. Their logo is a direct nod to the Canadian metal band Voivod.

== History ==
In late 1994, MC Serch (of 3rd Bass fame) took protégé Sabac Red and teamed up with DJ Eclipse and Ill Bill (La Coka Nostra/Heavy Metal Kings), thereby creating the group known as Non Phixion. Within six months, Goretex (now known as Lord Goat), a childhood friend of Ill Bill from Glenwood Houses, had joined the crew after freestyling for MC Serch in Bill's Starrett City apartment. Six months later, they had released their first single, "Legacy". It went on to sell over 25,000 copies worldwide, with little distribution, establishing the group as an international touring force. Necro was a member during the beginning of the group but was kicked out due to musical differences with MC Serch.

MC Serch secured the group a deal by letting them choose what label they desired, which was with major label Geffen Records, due to their growing roster of like-minded artists such as Killah Priest, the Roots, and GZA. Russell Simmons was also interested in the group after Serch brought them to his penthouse for a live meeting and performance, which due to scheduling never came to fruition. Serch kept releasing singles for the group through his own independent imprint Serchlite, and they continued to garner underground worldwide notoriety. Eventually, a series of miscommunications and incidents between the group and Serch over the mysterious whereabouts of money led to Non Phixion being dropped by the label during a merger with MCA Records, by way of then-owner Seagram.

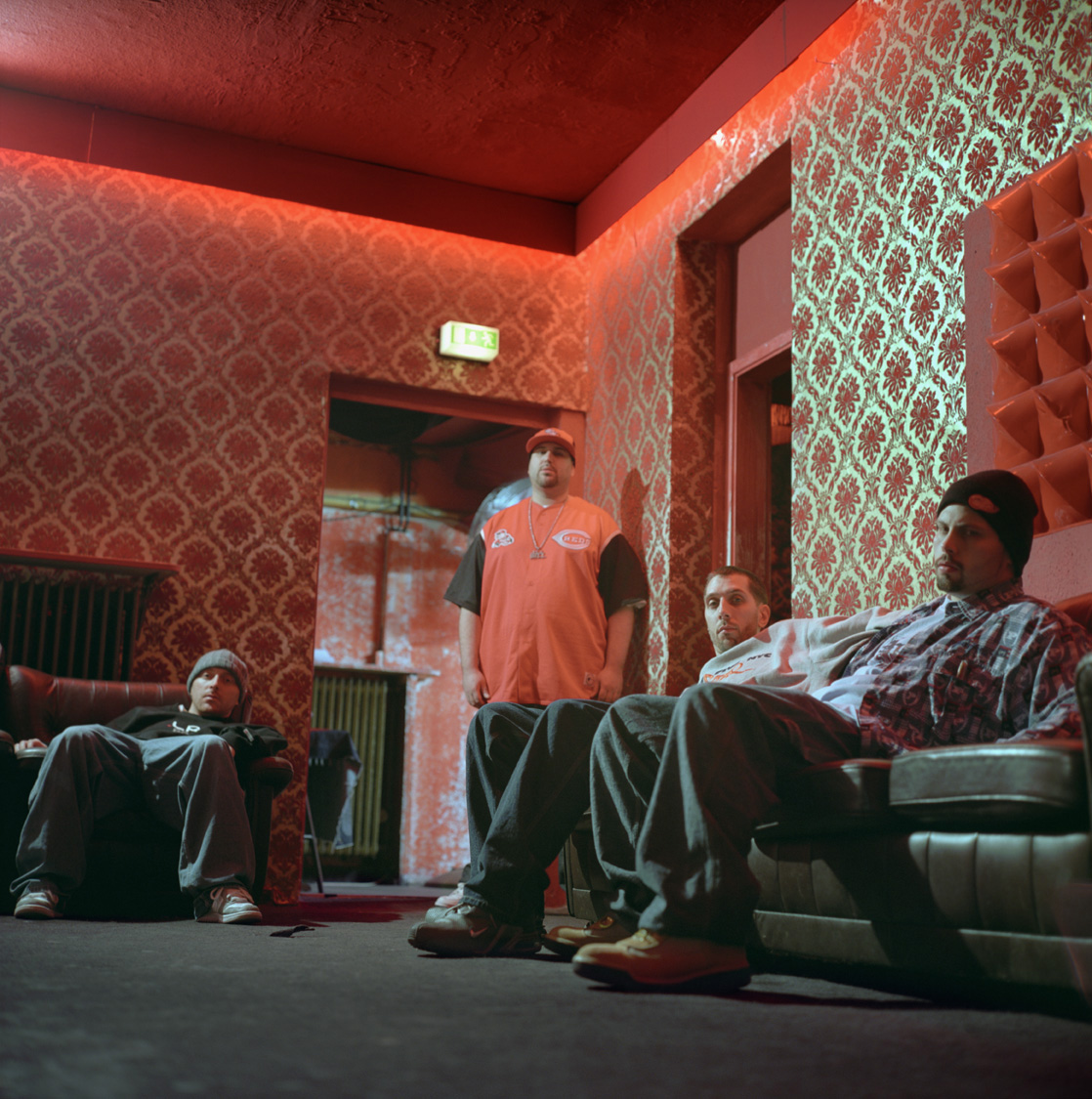
Hamburg, Germany, 2003

Following their attempt at a major label release, the members of Non Phixion spent their time performing live around the world at such places as Roskilde Festival, and Hultsfred Festival opening for contemporaries such as Gang Starr, Slayer, Black Moon, Rage Against the Machine, Fat Joe, Beastie Boys, Portishead, Queens of the Stone Age, Cypress Hill, GZA, The Beatnuts, Mos Def, and The Roots. After 1998 saw the release of their "I Shot Reagan" 12" on Uncle Howie Records, Non Phixion secured a deal for a full-length with Matador Records, however, this never came to fruition. Eminem manager Paul Rosenberg showed interest in managing Non Phixion, but due to timing this also never happened. Around 2000, Rick Rubin was attempting to bring Non Phixion to Warner Bros. and executive produce their record, but this too never materialized. Ultimately, their debut LP The Future Is Now was released on Ill Bill's own Uncle Howie Records on March 26, 2002. The Future Is Now features the production of hip hop giants such as Pete Rock, Large Professor, DJ Premier, The Beatnuts, Ill Bill's brother Necro, and Dave 1 from funk band Chromeo. A heavy metal remix for "The CIA Is Trying To Kill Me" produced by T-Ray was also included and features Christian Olde Wolbers, Raymond Herrera from Fear Factory, and guitarist Stephen Carpenter from Deftones. The Future Is Now also contains a rare at the time guest appearance from MF Doom. The cover artwork was created by Los Angeles artist Mear One from California graffiti crew C.B.S.

After the release of their seminal album, Non Phixion's members put out their first round of solo material: Ill Bill released What's Wrong with Bill? on March 2, 2004; this was followed by Sabac's Sabacolypse: A Change Gon' Come on June 15, 2004, and Goretex's The Art of Dying on October 26, 2004. All of their solo efforts were released on Necro's Psycho+Logical-Records. The following year, Ill Bill and Goretex released an album with Necro and Mr. Hyde as The Circle of Tyrants on September 13. At the time, there was talk of another full-length Non Phixion album called The Nuclear Truth with the same producers and ideas being extended from The Future Is Now. Non Phixion went on temporary hiatus in 2006 before a second LP was started. Goretex (now known as Lord Goat) left to work on solo material and develop his new record label, Supercoven.

Sabac moved to Oakland and Ill Bill started a new group with a number of other emcees called La Coka Nostra. MC Serch did not appear on Non Phixion's first album The Future Is Now. All of Non Phixion's work and solo material are highly regarded in the underground hip hop scene, as well as other genres. In January 2003, Non Phixion contributed a track to the film Biker Boyz, which starred Kid Rock and Laurence Fishburne. A track was also used for exploitation film Bully, but was pulled at the last minute due to subject matter.

Goretex dropped his second solo record titled Electric Lucifer under the name "Gore Elohim", in November 2013 on Supercoven Records.

The band's logo was created by Michel "Away" Langevin using the same font style that was used for his own futuristic metal band Voivod.

=== Reunion ===
In 2020, Ill Bill, Sabac and Goretex (now known as Lord Goat) reunited on the DJ Skizz-produced song "Watch The City Burn" from Ill Bill's fifth solo studio album La Bella Medusa.

== Discography ==
=== Studio albums ===
- The Future Is Now (Landspeed Records, 2002)

=== Compilation albums ===
- The Past, the Present and the Future Is Now (Uncle Howie / Matador, 2000)
- The Green CD/DVD (Uncle Howie, 2004)

=== Singles ===
Year	Title	Chart positions	
Year	Title	R&B/Hip-Hop; Singles Sales	Rap Singles
1996	"Legacy"	—	—
1997	"5 Boros"	—	—
1997	"4 W's"	—	—
1998	"5 Boros (Remix)	—	—
1998	"I Shot Reagan"	—	—
1999	"2004"	—	—
1999	"The Full Monty"	—	—
1999	"14 Years of Rap"	—	—
1999	"Sleepwalkers"	—	—
2000	"Black Helicopters"	—	46
2002	"Rock Stars"	72	—
2002	"Drug Music"	60	—
2003	"Say Goodbye to Yesterday"	—	—
2004	"Caught Between Worlds"	—	—
2004	"We All Bleed"	—	—
2004	"Food"	—	—
2020	"Watch the City Burn"	—	—
