= Once Upon a Crime (album) =

Studio album by the Godfathers
- Released: November 19, 2013
- Recorded: 2011–2013
- Genres: East Coast hip-hop; gangsta rap; horrorcore
- Length: 55:13
- Label: Psycho+Logical
- Producers: Domingo (exec.); Necro (also exec.); Kool G Rap (co.)

Kool G Rap chronology
Riches, Royalty, Respect (2011)	Once Upon a Crime (2013)	Return of the Don (2017)

Necro chronology
DIE! (2010)	Once Upon a Crime (2013)	The Notorious Goriest (2018)

Once Upon a Crime is the debut studio album by American New York-based hip-hop duo the Godfathers. It was released on November 19, 2013, through Psycho+Logical-Records. Production was handled by member Necro with one song, "Unsub", co-produced by member Kool G Rap. It features the lone guest appearance from Mr. Hyde. Songs "Heart Attack" and "Wolf Eyes" were released as singles.

== Background ==
Necro and Kool G Rap first announced their Godfathers project and collaboration in 2011 and released two mix CDs consisting of fifty previously released songs from the pair, The Pre-Kill Volume I in November 2011 and then The Pre-Kill Volume II in July 2012. They had initially announced that their first official album would be released in the first half of 2012, but Once Upon a Crime would not launch until November 2013. Domingo is credited as an Executive producer but Necro did all of the production on the album except "Unsub" which was produced by both Necro and Kool G Rap.

== Critical reception ==
Professional ratings
Review scores
Source	Rating
Exclaim!	7/10
HipHopDX	3/5
RapReviews	6/10

Once Upon a Crime received generally mixed to positive reviews from music critics. Mark Bozzer of Exclaim!gave the album 7 out of 10, praising the duo's synergy. Jay Balfour of HipHopDX noted, "the casual fan or those keeping up with G Rap's late career output might find a handful of songs worth mining, but without a previous investment in the over-the-top style, listening through is a test of endurance". Matt Jost of RapReviews concluded: "yet despite some fundamental flaws Once Upon a Crime is a record hip-hop can be proud of, one that represents the part of the family with ties to the underworld (and sometimes the afterworld) with aplomb".

== Track listing ==
No.	Title	Producer(s)	Length
1.	"Teflon Dons"	Necro	2:35
2.	"The City"	Necro	2:47
3.	"High Tension"	Necro	3:07
4.	"Punched Dead in the Face (Skit)"	Necro	0:17
5.	"Black Medicine"	Necro	2:40
6.	"Omerta"	Necro	3:00
7.	"The Pain"	Necro	3:44
8.	"Hustler"	Necro	3:19
9.	"We'll Kill You"	Necro	2:53
10.	"Crook Catastrophe & the Gunblast Kid"	Necro	3:46
11.	"Unsub"	Necro; Kool G Rap	4:40
12.	"I Hate You (Skit)"	Necro	0:11
13.	"Gangsta"	Necro	4:16
14.	"Trigga 4 Hire"	Necro	3:16
15.	"American Sickos"	Necro	2:36
16.	"Wolf Eyes" (featuring Mr. Hyde)	Necro	4:15
17.	"Heart Attack"	Necro	3:24
18.	"Once Upon a Crime"	Necro	4:27
Total length:			55:13

== Personnel ==
- Ron "Necro" Braunstein – vocals, producer, executive producer
- Nathaniel "Kool G Rap" Wilson – vocals, co-producer (track 11)
- Christopher "Mr. Hyde" Catenacci – vocals (track 16)
- Domingo Padilla – executive producer (credit only)
