= Glenwood Houses =

Public housing development in Brooklyn, New York

- NYCHA property
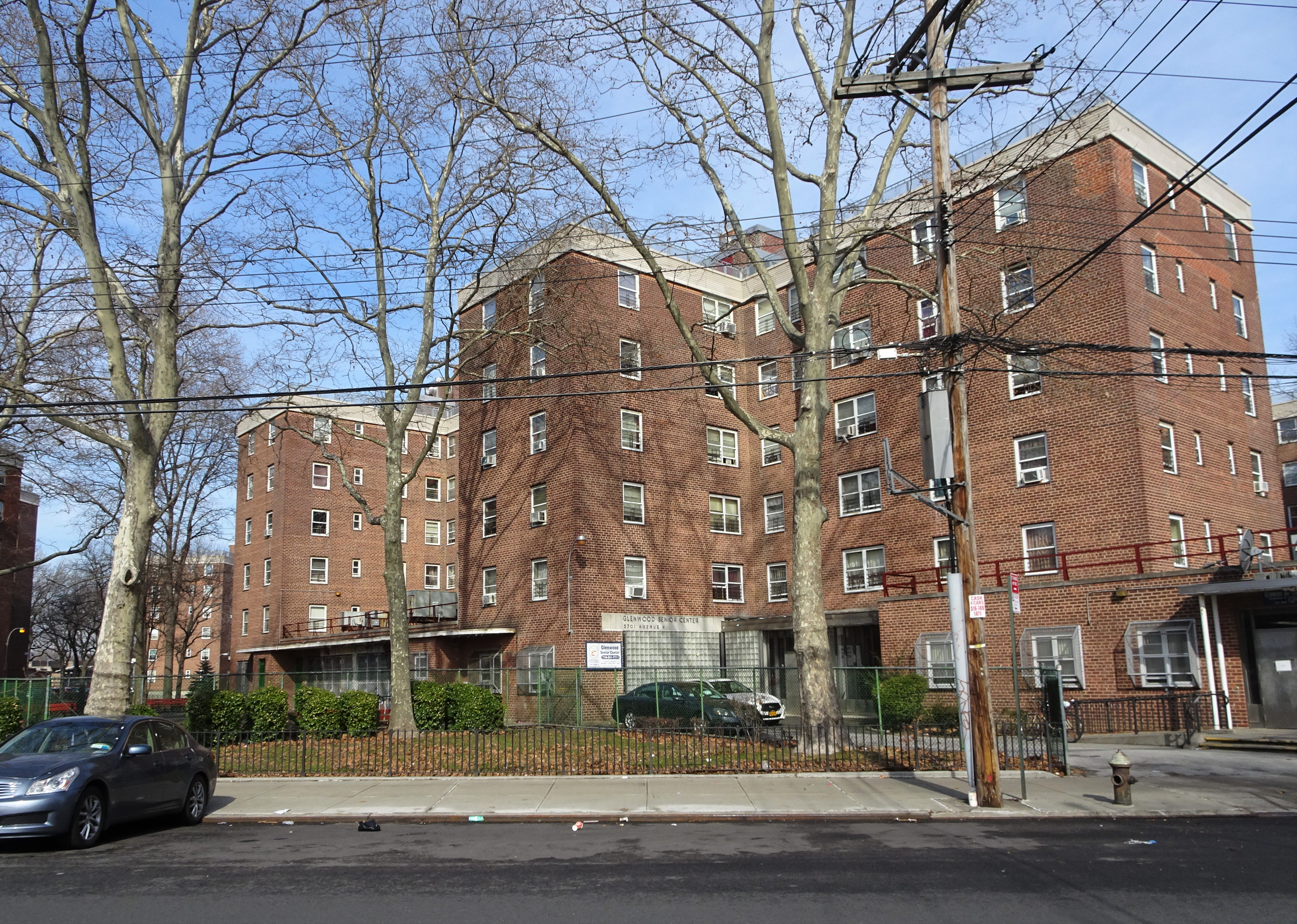
- Glenwood Houses in 2017
- Interactive map of Glenwood Houses
- Coordinates: 40.636106°N 73.919218°W
- Country: United States
- State: New York
- City: New York City
- Borough: Brooklyn
- ZIP codes: 11236
- Area codes: 718, 347, 929, and 917

The Glenwood Houses is a 22.39-acre (9.06 ha) moderate to low income public housing development operated by the New York City Housing Authority (NYCHA) in the Flatlands section of the New York City borough of Brooklyn. The development is bordered by Ralph Avenue on the east, East 56th Street on the west, Glenwood Road/Avenue H on the south, and Farragut Road on the north side.

== About ==
The Glenwood Houses were built during the post-World War II era when NYCHA reached its peak in construction of public housing projects (1945–65). The project was built in a modified tower-in-the-park style development, popular among NYCHA projects at that time.

The development was designed by architect Adolph Goldberg and construction began in 1949, and opened on July 14, 1950.

== Notable residents ==
- Neil Bogart (1943–1982), Casablanca Records owner and director
- Dagmara Domińczyk (born 1976), actress
- Marika Domińczyk (born 1980), actress
- Bernie Friedkin (born 1917), former prizefighter. Lived in the Glenwood Houses from 1950 to 1965.
- Ill Bill (born 1972), rapper
- Necro (born 1976), rapper
- Irvin S. Schonfeld -known for his research on work,stress, and health.

== See also ==
- New York City Housing Authority
