= The Godfathers (rap duo) =

American hip hop duo based in New York

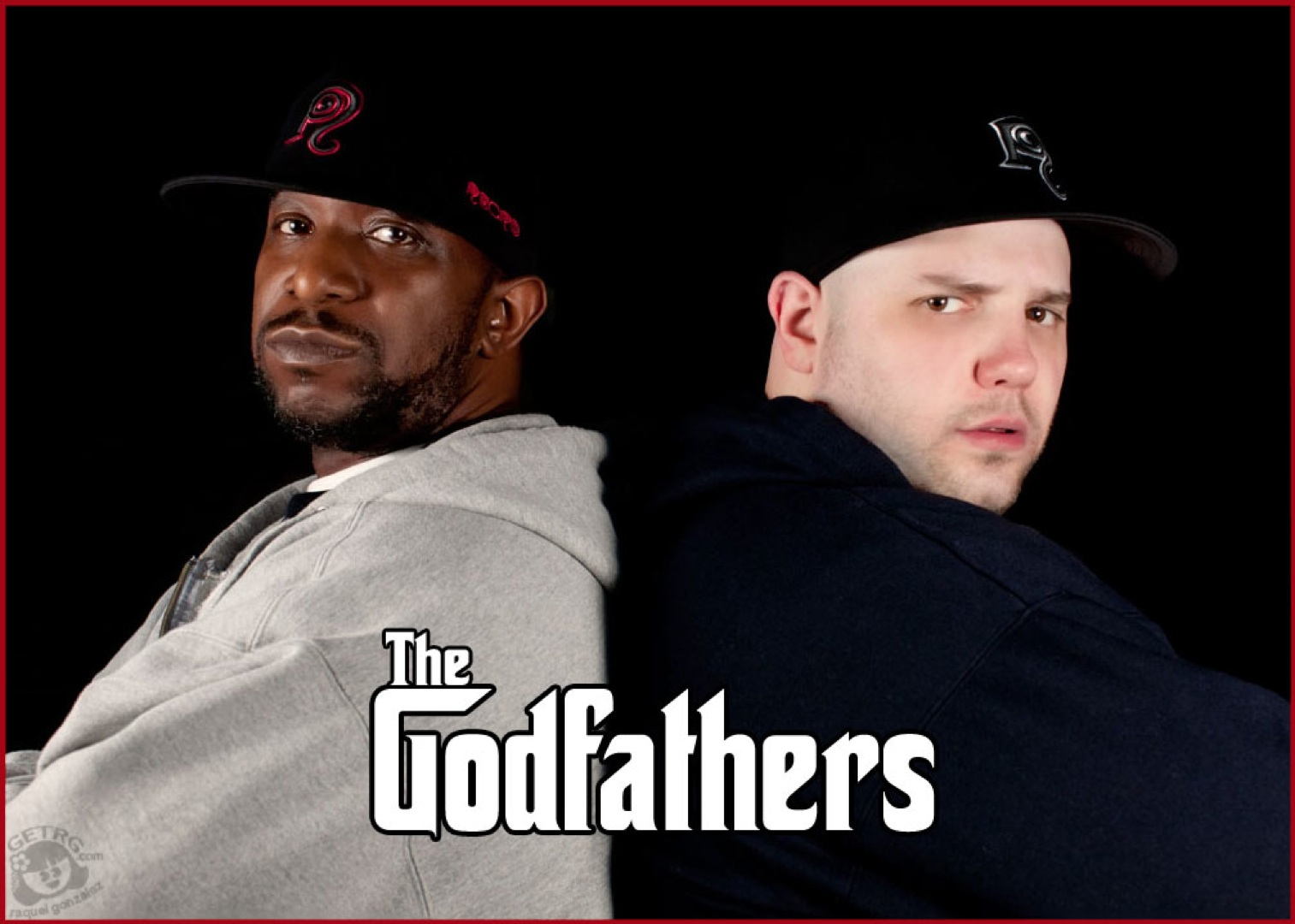
- 2011 publicity photo

Background information
- Origin: Queens and Brooklyn, New York, New York
- Genres: Hardcore hip hop
- Years active: 2011–present
- Labels: Psycho+Logical; RBC
- Members: Kool G Rap; Necro
- Website: Official Website

The Godfathers are a New York-based hardcore hip hop group formed in 2011 by horrorcore rapper and record producer Necro from Brooklyn and mafioso rapper Kool G Rap from Queens. The duo's debut studio album Once Upon a Crime was released on November 19, 2013, via Psycho+Logical-Records.

== Discography ==
Albums

- 2013: Once Upon a Crime

Mixtapes

- 2011: The Pre-Kill Volume I
- 2012: The Pre-Kill Volume II

Music videos

- 2013: "Heart Attack"
- 2014: "Unsub"

Guest appearances

- 2012: "The System" from The Murder Murder Kill Kill EP
