= Gory Days =

2001 album by American rapper Necro

Studio album by Necro
- Released: November 13, 2001
- Recorded: 2000–2001
- Studio: Fast Forward Studios (New York)
- Genres: Horrorcore; dirty rap
- Length: 55:30
- Label: Psycho+Logical
- Producer: Necro

Necro chronology
I Need Drugs (2000)	Gory Days (2001)	The Pre-Fix for Death (2004)

Alternative Cover
- Special Edition cover

Professional ratings
Review scores
Source	Rating
AllMusic	2/5 stars

Gory Days is the second studio album by American rapper and record producer Necro. It was released on November 13, 2001, via Psycho+Logical-Records. Recording sessions took place at Fast Forward Studios in New York. Production was handled entirely by Necro himself, who also served as an executive producer. It features guest appearances from Ill Bill, Captain Carnage, Goretex, Mr. Hyde and The Kid Joe. The album spawned two singles: "Morbid" b/w "Empty The Clip" and "Bury You With Satan" b/w "World Gone Mad". A music video was shot for "Dead Body Disposal" starring Peter Greene.

The original title for the album was "You're All Dying" but was changed to Gory Days after the September 11 attacks

Originally composed of 14 tracks, it was re-released on October 1, 2002, as a special edition limited to 5,000 copies with 2 bonus tracks and a DVD. In 2003, the instrumental version was released, containing 14 original tracks and 2 bonus tracks from special edition.

The songs "Bury You with Satan", "Dead Body Disposal" and "Poetry in the Streets" were subsequently remixed for 2003 mixtape Street Villains Vol. 1, with a new verse recorded exclusively for each of the remixes. "Bury You with Satan" was once again remixed for 2005 mixtape Street Villains Vol. 2. The song "Circle of Tyrants" served as the name of the eponymous super-group consisting of Necro, Ill Bill, Goretex and Mr. Hyde, who released a self-titled debut studio album in 2005.

The album is considered Necro's quickest selling release at the time.

The picture of Necro on the album cover was taken by Mr. Hyde in front of a cemetery in Ocean Parkway and the special edition cover with the DVD was illustrated by Carlos Latuff.

In 2013, Complex ranked the song "Dead Body Disposal" at number 4 on its 'The 25 Most Violent Rap Songs of All Time' list. In 2019, XXL named "Dead Body Disposal" as one of the '25 of the Most Disturbing Hip-Hop Songs'.

== Track listing ==
All music is composed by Ron "Necro" Braunstein.

No.	Title	Writer(s)	Length
1.	"Bury You with Satan"	Ron Braunstein	4:01
2.	"World Gone Mad"	R. Braunstein	4:50
3.	"Light My Fire"	R. Braunstein	3:23
4.	"Circle of Tyrants" (featuring Mr. Hyde, Goretex, Ill Bill and Captain Carnage)	R. Braunstein; Christopher Catenacci; Mitchell Manzanilla; William Braunstein; Captain Carnage	4:51
5.	"Dead Body Disposal"	R. Braunstein	5:43
6.	"You're All Dying"	R. Braunstein	3:35
7.	"All Hotties Eat the Jizz"	R. Braunstein	4:09
8.	"Scalpel"	R. Braunstein	3:55
9.	"12 King Pimp Commandments"	R. Braunstein	4:09
10.	"Gory Days"	R. Braunstein	3:15
11.	"Poetry in the Streets" (featuring Ill Bill)	R. Braunstein; W. Braunstein	3:42
12.	"Don't Try to Ruin It" (featuring The Kid Joe)	R. Braunstein; The Kid Joe	3:38
13.	"One Way or Another"	R. Braunstein	3:33
14.	"Morbid"	R. Braunstein	2:46
Total length:			55:30

Special edition bonus tracks
No.	Title	Length
15.	"24 Shots"	3:59
16.	"Violins of Violence" (featuring Mr. Hyde)	3:34

=== Bonus DVD ===
Special edition bonus DVD
No.	Title	Length
1.	"BET Commercial"
2.	"Interview Pt. 1"
3.	"'Your Fuckin Head Split' (Live At S.O.B.'s, NYC)"
4.	"Interview Pt. 2"
5.	"Rhyming Live On WKCR 89.9FM"
6.	"'I'm Sick Of You' (Live At S.O.B.'s, NYC)"
7.	"Interview Pt. 3"
8.	"Necro On VH1"
9.	"'I Need Drugs' Music Video"
10.	"Behind The Scenes Of The 'I Need Drugs' Music Video"
11.	"'I Need Drugs' Photo Shoot"
12.	"Necro Playing With Hookers Pt. 1"
13.	"Interview Pt. 4"
14.	"Fuckin With People"
15.	"'Rugged Shit' (Live At S.O.B.'s, NYC)"
16.	"'The Devil Made Me Do It' Short Film"
17.	"'Fleabag' Short Film"
18.	"'Get Me Dat Bread' (Skit)"
19.	"Behind The Scenes Of The 'The Devil Made Me Do It'"
20.	"Interview Pt. 5"
21.	"'187 Reasonz Y' Short Film"
22.	"Playing With Hookers Pt. 2"
23.	"'The Most Sadistic' (Live At S.O.B.'s, NYC)"
24.	"Kid Joe Skits"
25.	"Interview Pt. 6"
26.	"Howie Freaking Out"
27.	"Acapella Porn Rhyme (Live At Downtime, NYC)"
28.	"Ironman Skit"
29.	"Interview Pt. 7"
30.	"Gene Freaking Out"
31.	"'Rugged Shit' & 'Hoe Blow' (Live At Brownie's, NYC)"
32.	"Tito Blackjack Skit"
33.	"Interview Pt. 8"

=== Instrumentals ===
Gory Days Instrumentals

Compilation album by Necro
- Released: 2003
- Recorded: 2000–2001
- Genre: Instrumental hip-hop
- Length: 54:14
- Label: Psycho+Logical-Records
- Producer: Necro

Sample credits

- Track 1 contains elements of "Suite" by The Eleventh House.
- Track 3 contains elements of "Voyages" by Michel Polnareff and "Light My Fire" by The Doors.
- Track 4 contains elements of "Acid - The Story of LSD" from A/V Geeks 16mm School Soundtracks.
- Track 5 contains elements of "Melissa" by Francis Lai, "Let's Talk About Sex" by Salt-N-Pepa and a dialogue from 2000 film Snatch.
- Track 7 contains elements of "La Via Della Prostituzione M9" by Nico Fidenco and "Nobody Beats the Biz" by Biz Markie & T.J. Swan.
- Track 8 contains elements of "Looks Like Twins" by Otis Spann.
- Track 10 contains elements of "Glory Days" by Bruce Springsteen.
- Track 11 contains elements of "Song of the Lamplighters" by Mzuiri.
- Track 13 contains elements of "Dawning" by Triumvirat and "One Way or Another" by Blondie.
- Track 15 contains elements of "Dopping 2000" by Gabriele Ducros.
- Track 16 contains elements of "Bella by Barlight" by John Lurie from 1984 film Stranger Than Paradise and Milla Jovovich monologue from 1999 film The Messenger: The Story of Joan of Arc.

== Personnel ==
- Ron "Necro" Braunstein – songwriter, vocals, producer, arranger, mixing, executive producer, art direction, design, photography, management
- William "Ill Bill" Braunstein – songwriter & vocals (tracks: 4, 11)
- Christopher "Mr. Hyde" Catenacci – songwriter & vocals (track 4), photography
- Mitchell "Goretex" Manzanilla – songwriter & vocals (track 4)
- Captain Carnage – songwriter & vocals (track 4)
- The Kid Joe – songwriter & vocals (track 12)
- Elliott Thomas – mixing, engineering
- John "Sabac Red" Fuentes – mixing
- Bones – engineering
- Duncan Stanbury – mastering
- Mike Lewis – photography
