= I Need Drugs =

Studio album by Necro
- Released: November 7, 2000
- Recorded: 1997–2000
- Studios: No Mystery Studios (New York, NY)
- Genre: Horrorcore
- Length: 1:05:41
- Label: Psycho+Logical-Records
- Producer: Necro

Necro chronology
| I Need Drugs (2000) | Gory Days (2001) |

Alternative Cover
- Censored cover

I Need Drugs is the debut studio album by the American rapper Necro, released on November 7, 2000, by Psycho+Logical-Records. This album maintains emphasis on both his violence and sex themes, rather than focusing on one or the other such as in his 2001 album Gory Days and his 2005 album The Sexorcist, respectively. The album spawned one single, "The Most Sadistic", and a music video for the title track.

== Contents ==
The album contains 13 studio tracks and three radio freestyles. Seven of the studio tracks from the album were previously released on the "Get on Your Knees" single and the Necro EP. Featured guests on the album include Necro's brother Ill Bill and Mr. Hyde.

I Need Drugs contains many Necro classics, all of which showcase notable styles Necro refers to as "gore" ("Your Fuckin' Head Split"), "sex" ("Get on Your Knees") and "violence" ("The Most Sadistic").

A controversial music video was made for "I Need Drugs", which depicts Necro's uncle and his uncle's friend shooting heroin and smoking crack cocaine while Necro performs the song. A still image of his uncle also appears as the cover art for the album.

"The Most Sadistic" and "Fuck You to the Track" were subsequently remixed since this release, in 2003 for Rare Demos and Freestyles Volume 1 and 2005 for Rare Demos and Freestyles Vol. 2 respectively. An alternate mix of "Rugged Shit" was also released in 2003 on Rare Demos & Freestyles Vol. 3.

The track "Your Fucking Head Split" contains a sample from the soundtrack of The Amazing Spider-Man.

The track "Cockroaches" contains a sample from the 1983 film Scarface

The song "Your Fuckin' Head Split" was featured in the 2011 movie Goon.

== Reception ==
Professional ratings
Review scores
| Source | Rating |
|---|---|
| AllMusic | 1.5/5 stars |
| NME | 3.5/5 stars |
| RapReviews | 7/10 |

In 2009, Fangoria named it as an iconic horrorcore album.

AllMusic ran a review by critic Jon Azpiri panning the album. He stated that "the album's unwavering desire to shock us is what makes it so boring" and that "the production is remarkably bland".

== Track listing ==
All tracks are written by Ron Braunstein, except tracks 1 and 5 written with William Braunstein.

| No. | Title | Length |
|---|---|---|
| 1. | "The Most Sadistic" (featuring Ill Bill) | 2:59 |
| 2. | "Hoe Blow" | 3:33 |
| 3. | "I Need Drugs" | 4:40 |
| 4. | "Your Fucking Head Split" | 3:04 |
| 5. | "You're Dead" (featuring Ill Bill) | 3:00 |
| 6. | "Get on Your Knees" | 5:36 |
| 7. | "Rugged Shit" | 3:07 |
| 8. | "I'm Sick of You" | 3:13 |
| 9. | "Cockroaches" | 2:44 |
| 10. | "Fuck You to the Track" | 3:13 |
| 11. | "Burn the Groove to Death (Nail 'Em to the Cross)" | 5:18 |
| 12. | "Underground" | 5:52 |
| 13. | "S.T.D." | 2:39 |
| 14. | "WKCR 89.9 Freestyle 4/20/2000" (featuring Mr. Hyde) | 8:17 |
| 15. | "WNYU 89.1 X-Mas Freestyle 12/23/1999" | 2:29 |
| 16. | "WNYU 89.1 Freestyle 5/10/2000" | 5:57 |
| Total length: | | 1:05:41 |

== Personnel ==
- Ron "Necro" Braunstein – vocals, producer, mixing, executive producer, artwork
- William "Ill Bill" Braunstein – vocals (tracks: 1, 5)
- Christopher "Mr. Hyde" Catenacci – vocals (track 14)
- Jeff Abell – engineering, mixing
