= Die (album) =

Die!

Studio album by Necro
- Released: May 18, 2010
- Recorded: 2008–2010
- Studio: Necro Studios (New York, NY)
- Genre: Horrorcore
- Length: 52:09
- Label: Psycho+Logical
- Producer: Necro (also exec.)

Necro chronology
Death Rap (2007)	Die! (2010)	Once Upon a Crime (2013)

Professional ratings
Review scores
Source	Rating
AllMusic	4/5 stars
HipHopDX	3/5
Juice	4/6
RapReviews	5.5/10

Die! is the sixth solo studio album by American rapper and record producer Necro. It was released on May 18, 2010 via Psycho+Logical-Records. Recording sessions took place at Necro Studios in New York City. Production was handled by Necro himself. The album peaked at number 48 on the Top R&B/Hip-Hop Albums and number 19 on the Top Heatseekers in the United States.

Die! was initially alluded to on Necro's MySpace profile as a "brand new solo album coming September 2009"; however, on August 13, the page's header was updated with an announcement of the album's title and its release date, which was put back to May 2010. The album's release date was finalized when the album cover was released on March 25, 2010.

On July 17, 2010, Necro revealed on the website's forum that he was being sued by Ani DiFranco for sampling her song "Used to You" for the track "The Asshole Anthem". iTunes and Amazon subsequently removed the album from their stores, and Necro confirmed he was in the process of re-releasing the album without this track included.

== Track listing ==
All tracks are written by Ron Braunstein.

No.	Title	Length
1.	"AsBESTos"	4:05
2.	"Pit"	3:07
3.	"Thugcore Cowboy"	2:47
4.	"DIE!"	2:56
5.	"Set It"	3:33
6.	"Brutalized"	3:15
7.	"Serpent's Bite"	2:51
8.	"The Kink Panther"	3:06
9.	"Hey Now"	3:38
10.	"The Asshole Anthem"	2:49
11.	"Sorcerer of Death's Construction"	2:39
12.	"First Blood"	3:14
13.	"Thin Line Between Love & Hate"	3:06
14.	"Bedbugs"	0:45
15.	"Viva Necro"	3:53
16.	"F.U.B.a.R."	3:00
17.	"The Human Traffic King (White Slavery, Pt. 2)"	3:25
Total length:		52:09

== Personnel ==
- Ron "Necro" Braunstein – lyrics, vocals, producer, mixing, executive producer
- Elliot Thomas – engineering, mixing
- Charles de Montebello – mastering
- D.W. Frydendall – artwork

== Charts ==
Chart (2010)	Peak position
US Top R&B/Hip-Hop Albums (Billboard)	48
US Heatseekers Albums (Billboard)	19
