= Psycho+Logical-Records =

American independent record label

- Founded: November 1999
- Founder: Necro
- Status: Active
- Distributors: Landspeed Distribution (2000–2001), Select-O-Hits (2001–2007) E1 Music (2007–2009), Fontana Distribution (2009–2012), INgrooves (2012–present)
- Genre: Hip-hop, death rap, hip-hop metal
- Country of origin: United States
- Location: New York City
- Official website: necroproduct.com

Psycho+Logical-Records is an independent record label based in New York City. Founded in 1999 by rapper and producer Necro, its first release was Necro's debut I Need Drugs. It went on to release notable albums by hip-hop artists such as the debut solo albums of Ill Bill, Sabac Red and Goretex of Non Phixion, as well as Mr. Hyde. Releases are distributed on CD & digitally through formats such as iTunes, and several albums and singles have been released on 12" vinyl as well. Among the label's current artists are Necro and Mr Hyde, and the label as of 2014 has released 42 albums.

== History ==
=== 1999-01: Founding, first releases ===
Psycho+Logical-Records is a record label owned by rapper Necro, and operating in New York City. Psycho+Logical-Records started off in November 1999 as a means through which Necro could release his debut album, I Need Drugs, in 2000. The label was named after the concept that it is logical for acts to be psychotic. Before selling the album online, he would sell hard-copies to fans at shows and on the streets. According to Necro, at one point in 1999 he had around 100 international fans selling the CDs he'd personally pressed, writing that "they would sell it for $13, and give me $8 a CD, and keep $5 a CD." He states he was first inspired to sell records this way by reading interviews with Master P.

I Need Drugs officially was released in stores in 2000, and afterwards Necro signed a deal for both the Psycho+Logical imprint and the album with Landspeed Distribution. The original $125,000 contract was downsized after Landspeed claimed they were low on funds, and the album received less promotion than originally planned. To help compensate, Necro writes that he gave "1,000's of I Need Drugs sampler cassettes" to fans for free, often mailing them as a promotion.

I Need Drugs was followed by his 2000 album Instrumentals Vol. 1, and the following year he released the compilation album The Early Years: Rare Demos '91–'94 by his collaborator and brother Ill Bill. The Early Years: Rare Demos '91–'94 is the first rarities released under Psycho+Logical-Records. Featured guests on the compilation include Non Phixion and Circle of Tyrants member Goretex. These tracks where recorded between 1991 and 1994. Necro went on to release several more albums in 2001, including Gory Days with Select-O-Hits as a distributor. The label has a long history of releasing instrumental albums to accompany major studio releases, such as Gory Days Instrumentals in 2003.

=== 2003–09: Increased output ===
The first wave of albums released on Necro's label were entirely produced by Necro himself. This includes the debut solo albums of Non Phixion members Ill Bill, Sabac Red and Goretex after he already produced 7 songs for Non Phixion's debut album The Future Is Now in 2002 and Non Phixion's The Green CD in 2004, and two albums for label member Mr Hyde. "What's Wrong with Bill?" is Ill Bill's debut studio album, released on March 2, 2004, by Psycho+Logical. The album spawned one single, "The Anatomy of a School Shooting", and a music video for "Chasing the Dragon". Necro produced the entire album. The label has also previously worked with groups such as Non Phixion (Goretex, ill Bill, Sabac Red), with whom Necro formed the supergroup Secret Society and released an album on the label.

Circle of Tyrants was an underground hip-hop group signed to the label consisting of Necro, Ill BIll, Mr Hyde and Goretex. The group only released one album, named "The Circle of Tyrants" which was released in 2005. Necro produced all tracks on this album. Goretex released several albums on Psycho-Logical but left after being kicked out of Non Phixion. After the group disbanded, other members went on to release solo projects, several on Psycho-Logical as well.

Q-Unique was associated with the label for a time, as was the rapper Nems, who was originally going to release Prezident's Day on the label, but eventually released it under Creative Juices as Necro was having difficulties with E1 Music at the time.

=== 2010–14: Recent years ===
Recent albums include The Murder Murder Kill Kill EP by Necro, released in August 2012 and featuring the appearance of Kool G Rap. Necro had a collaboration on the label with The Godfathers and Kool G Rap in 2013. As of 2014 the major artists associated with the label include Mr. Hyde and Necro.

== Distribution ==
The label has a history of using several distributors, first with Landspeed Distribution for the first year, and then E1 Music and Fontana Distribution. In 2012 the label became associated with the distribution INgrooves. As of 2014 the entire Psycho+Logical-Records catalog is available on iTunes listed under Necro, as well as 300 other national and international digital outlets. CD and vinyl prints of several releases can be obtained via stores.

== Artists ==
Current

- Necro
- Mr. Hyde

Past

- Circle Of Tyrants
- Goretex
- Ill Bill
- Nems
- Q-Unique
- Riviera Regime
- Sabac Red
- Sean Strange

== Discography ==
=== Albums ===
Selected releases for Psycho+Logical-Records
Yr	Cat. #	Release title	Artist(s)	Format
2000	PSR0001	I Need Drugs	Necro	CD
2000	PL4	Feel This Shit	The Artist Formerly Known As Fashion	Vinyl
2001		Instrumentals Vol. 1	Necro	CD
2001	PLR0007	The Early Years: Rare Demos '91–'94	Ill Bill	CD
2001	PSL0008	Gory Days	Necro	CD
2001	PSR0009	Rare Demos and Freestyles Vol. 1	Necro	CD
2001	PSR0010	Rare Demos and Freestyles Vol. 2	Necro	CD
2003	PLR0011	Gory Days Instrumentals	Necro	CD
2003		Street Villains Vol. 1	Necro and Ill Bill	CD
2003	PLR0013	Rare Demos & Freestyles Vol. 3	Necro	CD
2003	PLR0014	Rare Demos & Freestyles Vol. 3	Necro	LP
2003	PLR0015	Brutality Part 1	Necro	CD
2003	PLR0016	Brutality Part 1	Necro	LP
2004	PLR0020	What's Wrong with Bill?	Ill Bill	CD
2004	PLR0021	What's Wrong with Bill?	Ill Bill	LP
2004	PLR0023	Sabacolypse: A Change Gon' Come	Sabac Red	CD
2004	PLR0024	Sabacolypse: A Change Gon' Come	Sabac Red	LP
2004	PLR0026	Barn of the Naked Dead	Mr. Hyde	CD
2004	PLR0027	Barn of the Naked Dead	Mr. Hyde	LP
2004	PLR0033	The Pre-Fix for Death	Necro	CD
2004	PLR0034	The Pre-Fix for Death	Necro	LP
2004	PLR0036	The Art of Dying	Goretex	CD
2004	PLR0037	The Art of Dying	Goretex	LP
2005	PLR0038	Street Villains Vol. 2	Necro and Ill Bill	CD
2005	PLR0039	The Pre-Fix for Death Instrumentals	Necro	CD
2005	PLR0040	What's Wrong with Bill? Instrumentals	Ill Bill	CD
2005	PLR0041	The Art of Dying Instrumentals	Goretex	CD
2005	PLR0042	Sabacolypse: A Change Gon' Come Instrumentals	Sabac Red	CD
2005	PLR0043	Barn of the Naked Dead Instrumentals	Mr. Hyde	CD
2005	PLR0044	Brutality Part 1 Instrumentals	Necro	CD
2005	PLR0045	The Sexorcist	Necro	CD
2005	PLR0046	The Circle of Tyrants	The Circle of Tyrants	CD
2007	PLR0047	Rare Demos and Freestyles	Mr. Hyde	CD
2007	PLR0048	Death Rap	Necro	CD
2008	PLR0049	Chronicles of the Beast Man	Mr. Hyde	CD
2008	PLR0050	The Sexorcist: Special Edition CD/DVD	Necro	CD
2008	PLR0051	Real Soldierz Ride CD/DVD	Riviera Regime	CD, DVD
2008	PLR0052	The Ritual	Sabac Red	CD, DVD
		Death Rap Instrumentals	Necro	CD
2010	PLR0060	DIE!	Necro	CD
		Die Instrumentals	Necro	CD
		Die Acapellas	Necro	CD
2011		The Pre-Kill, Vol. 1	The Godfathers	CD
2012		The Pre-Kill, Vol. 2	The Godfathers	CD
2012	PLR0066	Murder Murder Kill Kill EP	Necro	CD
		Murder Murder Kill Kill EP Instrumentals	Necro	CD
		Murder Murder Kill Kill EP Acapellas	Necro	CD
		Metal Hip-Hop	Necro	CD
		The Pre-Fix For Death Acapellas	Necro	CD
		Problemz	Missin' Linx	LP
2018	PLR0110	The Notorious Goriest	Necro	CD
2023	PLR0141	Absolut Horror	Necro	CD, EP
2023	PLR0142	Pestilence EP	Necro	CD, EP

=== 12" singles ===
12" vinyl singles by Psycho+Logical-Records
Year	Title	Primary artist	Album	Format
1999	"Gangsta Rap"	Ill Bill		12" vinyl
1999	"The Most Sadistic"	Necro	I Need Drugs	12" vinyl
2001	"Morbid"	Necro	Gory Days	12" vinyl, PLR0005
2001	"Bury You with Satan"	Necro	Gory Days	12" vinyl, PLR0009
2003	"Fire"	Necro	Brutality Part 1	12" vinyl
2004	"The Anatomy of a School Shooting"	Ill Bill	What's Wrong with Bill?	12" vinyl
	"Get on Your Knees"	Necro		12" vinyl
	"Organize"	Sabac Red		12" vinyl

== See also ==
- List of record labels
