= The Pre-Fix for Death =

Studio album by Necro
- Released: September 21, 2004
- Recorded: 2003–04
- Genre: Horrorcore; rap metal
- Length: 1:11:24
- Label: Psycho+Logical-Records
- Producer: Necro

Necro chronology
Gory Days (2001)	The Pre-Fix for Death (2004)	The Sexorcist (2005)

Instrumentals cover art

Professional ratings
Review scores
Source	Rating
AllMusic	3/5 stars

The Pre-Fix for Death is the third studio album by American horrorcore musician Necro. It was released on September 21, 2004 through Psycho+Logical-Records. Production was handled by Necro himself, who also served as executive producer. It features guest appearances from Jamey Jasta, John Tardy, Danny Diablo, Goretex, Ill Bill, Jenny Cassabian, Jenny Krenwinkle, Mr. Hyde, Sabac Red, as well as contributions from Away, Sean Martin, Dan Lilker, Trevor Peres and Sid Wilson.

The instrumental version of the album omitted all the seven skits out of original 25-track album and was released on June 20, 2005 via Psycho+Logical.

Unlike his previous albums, The Pre-Fix for Death sees Necro fusing death metal into several of the album's tracks. It is also the first album to feature live instrumentation by Necro himself.

Music videos were filmed for "The Pre-fix for Death", directed by David Brodsky, and "Beautiful Music for You to Die To". Necro's fifth studio album, Death Rap, would be released in 2007 and would be named after the nineteenth track off this album.

== Track listing ==
No.	Title	Writer(s)	Length
1.	"Intro"	Ron Braunstein	0:43
2.	"Beautiful Music for You to Die To"	R. Braunstein	3:22
3.	"The Dispensation of Life and Death"	R. Braunstein	3:22
4.	"Kill That Shit"	R. Braunstein	3:09
5.	"Pre-Fix (Skit)" (featuring Jenny Krenwinkle)	R. Braunstein	0:51
6.	"The Pre-Fix for Death" (featuring Away)	R. Braunstein; Michel Langevin	3:48
7.	"Push It to the Limit" (featuring Jamey Jasta)	R. Braunstein	3:31
8.	"Reflection of Children Coming Up in the Grave" (featuring Charles Manson)	R. Braunstein	4:24
9.	"It (Skit)"	R. Braunstein	1:08
10.	"Insaneology" (featuring John Tardy, Sean Martin and Dan Lilker)	R. Braunstein; John Tardy; Sean Martin; Dan Lilker	4:49
11.	"Nirvana" (featuring Mr. Hyde, Ill Bill and Goretex)	R. Braunstein; Christopher Catenacci; William Braunstein; Mitchell Manzanilla	3:32
12.	"86 Measures of Game"	R. Braunstein	5:16
13.	"Empowered" (featuring John Tardy, Trevor Peres, Dan Lilker, Away and #0)	R. Braunstein; Tardy; Trevor Peres; Lilker; Langevin; Sid Wilson	3:37
14.	"Kid Joe (Skit)"	R. Braunstein	1:21
15.	"Human Consumption"	R. Braunstein	3:53
16.	"Evil Shit"	R. Braunstein	3:30
17.	"You Did It"	R. Braunstein	3:16
18.	"Rogue (Skit)"	R. Braunstein	0:23
19.	"Death Rap" (featuring Sabac Red)	R. Braunstein; John Fuentes	3:14
20.	"Watch Your Back" (featuring Danny Diablo)	R. Braunstein; Dan Singer	3:03
21.	"Food for Thought"	R. Braunstein	3:42
22.	"Important Statistics (Skit)"	R. Braunstein	0:38
23.	"Senseless Violence" (featuring Jenny Cassabian)	R. Braunstein	3:11
24.	"Push It to the Limit (NYHC Mix)" (featuring Jamey Jasta)	R. Braunstein	3:31
25.	"Outro"	R. Braunstein	0:10
Total length:			1:11:24

Sample credits

- Track 2 contains samples from the main title of 1977 Italian poliziotteschi film noir Beast with a Gun.
- Track 3 contains samples from the song "Apoteosi del mistero" from the Swedish progressive rock band Morte Macabre's 1998 album Symphonic Holocaust, which itself was originally composed by Fabio Frizzi for Lucio Fulci's 1980 supernatural horror film City of the Living Dead.
- Track 4 contains samples of the ending theme from the Herschell Gordon Lewis 1967 film The Gruesome Twosome, composed by Larry Wellington.
- Track 7 contains samples from the main title from the 1981 Hong Kong film The Guy with the Secret Kung Fu, and re-sung lyrics from "Scarface (Push It to the Limit)" in its chorus.
- Track 8 contains samples from "Melancholy Man" performed by Paul Mauriat from his 1971 album El Condor Pasa.
- Track 9 is an excerpt from Jonathan Demme's 1991 horror film The Silence of the Lambs.
- Track 11 contains samples from Juan Carlos Calderón's composition "Purification" from 1972 Spanish horror film Vengeance of the Zombies.
- Track 12 contains interpolations from Gene Simmons interview for NPR with Terry Gross.
- Track 14 contains samples from the theme from 1976 horror film Blood Sucking Freaks, and its chorus is based on a line from Necro's song "Bury You with Satan" from his 2001 album Gory Days.
- Track 17 contains excerpts from Billy Joel's 1989 single "We Didn't Start the Fire", samples from Ozzy Osbourne's 1980 song "Suicide Solution", and excerpts from the audio of politician R. Budd Dwyer's 1987 televised suicide.

== Personnel ==
- Necro – vocals, organ (tracks: 6, 10), guitar & bass (tracks: 6, 20), producer, recording, mixing, executive producer
- Jenny Krenwinkle – vocals (track 5)
- Michel "Away" Langevin – drums (tracks: 6, 13)
- Jamey Jasta – vocals (tracks: 7, 24)
- Charles Manson – voice (track 8)
- John Tardy – vocals (tracks: 10, 13)
- Sean Martin – guitar (track 10)
- Dan Lilker – bass (tracks: 10, 13)
- Christopher "Mr. Hyde" Catenacci – vocals (track 11)
- William "Ill Bill" Braunstein – vocals (track 11)
- Mitchell "Goretex" Manzanilla – vocals (track 11)
- Trevor Peres – guitar (track 13)
- Sid "#0" Wilson – scratches (track 13)
- John "Sabac Red" Fuentes – vocals (track 19)
- Dan "Danny Diablo" Singer – vocals (track 20)
- Jenny Cassabian – vocals (track 23)
- Elliott Thomas – recording, mixing
- Charles De Montebello – mastering
- Edward J. Repka – cover art
