= What's Wrong with Bill? =

Studio album by Ill Bill
- Released: May 4, 2004
- Studio: Powerhouse Studios (New York, NY)
- Genre: Hardcore hip-hop
- Length: 56:43
- Label: Psycho+Logical-Records
- Producer: Necro (also exec.); Ill Bill

Ill Bill chronology
The Future Is Now (2002)	What's Wrong with Bill? (2004)	The Hour of Reprisal (2008)

Singles from What's Wrong with Bill?
- 1. "The Anatomy Of A School Shooting / Unstoppable" Released: 2004

Professional ratings
Review scores
Source	Rating
AllMusic	3/5 stars
Cokemachineglow	59%/100%
HipHopDX	8.5/10
laut.de	4/5 stars
Pitchfork	7.7/10
RapReviews	7.5/10
Stylus	C
Tiny Mix Tapes	3.5/5 marks

What's Wrong with Bill? is the debut studio album by American rapper and record producer Ill Bill. It was released on May 4, 2004, by Psycho+Logical-Records. Recording sessions took place at Powerhouse Studios in New York. Production was handled by Ill Bill himself with his brother Necro, who also served as executive producer. It features guest appearances from Necro, Goretex, Mr. Hyde, Q-Unique, Sabac Red and Uncle Howie.

== Track listing ==
No.	Title	Writer(s)	Producer(s)	Length
1.	"What's Wrong"	William Braunstein; Ron Braunstein	Necro; Ill Bill (co.)	4:00
2.	"Overkill"	W. Braunstein; R. Braunstein	Necro	3:54
3.	"The Anatomy of a School Shooting"	W. Braunstein; R. Braunstein	Necro; Ill Bill (co.)	3:21
4.	"Glenwood Projects" (featuring Uncle Howie, Necro and Goretex)	W. Braunstein; R. Braunstein; Mitchell Manzanilla	Necro; Ill Bill (co.)	3:54
5.	"Peace Sells"	W. Braunstein; R. Braunstein	Necro; Ill Bill (co.)	3:36
6.	"Unstoppable"	W. Braunstein; R. Braunstein	Necro	3:37
7.	"Death Smiles at Murder" (featuring Mr. Hyde)	W. Braunstein; R. Braunstein	Necro	3:00
8.	"Chasing the Dragon" (featuring Necro)	W. Braunstein; R. Braunstein	Necro	4:04
9.	"Alien Workshop"	W. Braunstein; R. Braunstein	Necro; Ill Bill (co.)	3:09
10.	"Canarsie Artie's Brigade" (featuring Necro, Q-Unique and Goretex)	W. Braunstein; R. Braunstein; Manzanilla; Anthony Quiles	Necro	3:20
11.	"Porno Director" (featuring Goretex and Sabac Red)	W. Braunstein; R. Braunstein; Manzanilla; John Fuentes	Necro; Ill Bill (co.)	4:27
12.	"American History X"	W. Braunstein; R. Braunstein	Necro	4:12
13.	"Uncle Zowie"	W. Braunstein; R. Braunstein	Necro	0:39
14.	"Legend Has It"	W. Braunstein; R. Braunstein	Necro; Ill Bill (co.)	4:07
15.	"The Final Scene"	W. Braunstein; R. Braunstein	Necro	3:07
16.	"Chasing the Dragon (Moshpit Mix)" (featuring Necro)	W. Braunstein; R. Braunstein	Necro; Ill Bill	4:16
Total length:				56:43

== Personnel ==
- William "Ill Bill" Braunstein – vocals, producer (track 16), co-producer (tracks: 1, 3–5, 9, 11, 14), recording, mixing
- Ron "Necro" Braunstein – vocals (tracks: 4, 8, 10, 16), guitar & bass (track 16), producer, recording, mixing, executive producer
- Mitchell "Goretex" Manzanilla – vocals (tracks: 4, 10, 11)
- Howard "Uncle Howie" Tenenbaum – vocals (track 4)
- Christopher "Mr. Hyde" Catenacci – vocals (track 7)
- Anthony "Q-Unique" Quiles – vocals (track 10)
- John "Sabac Red" Fuentes – vocals (track 11)
- Elliott Thomas – recording, mixing
- Charles De Montebello – mastering
- Michael Lavine – photography
- Emily Optics – photography
- Hobin Choi – photography
- Paul Gulacy – cover
