= Necro (rapper) =

American rapper (born 1976)

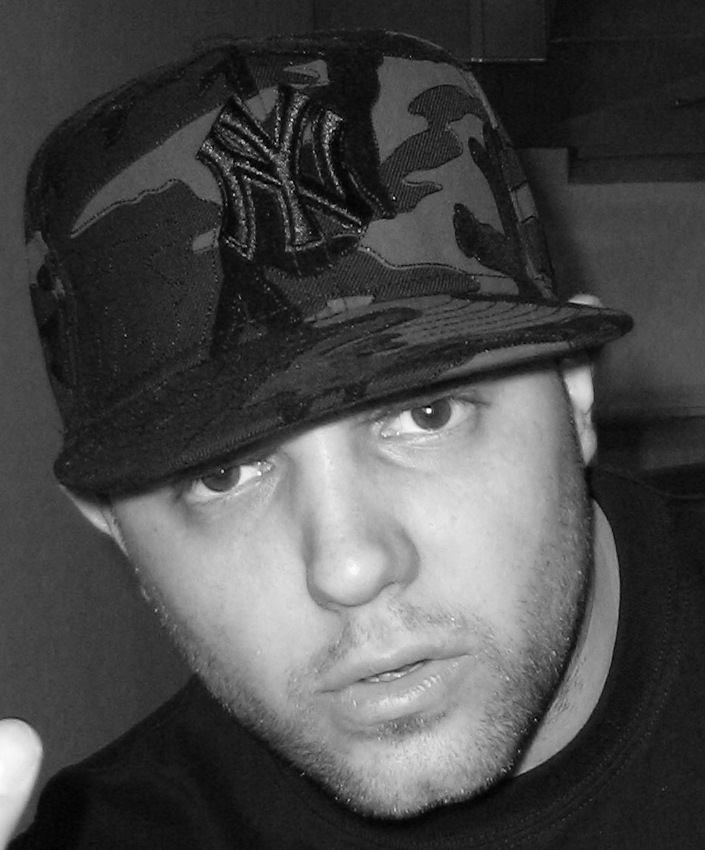
- Necro in 2007

Background information
- Born: Ron Raphael Braunstein; June 7, 1976 (age 50); New York City, U.S.
- Genres: Hardcore hip-hop, horrorcore
- Occupations: Rapper; record producer
- Years active: 1987–present
- Label: Psycho+Logical
- Member of: Circle Of Tyrants; Secret Society; The Godfathers
- Website: https://necrosuperstore.com/

Ron Raphael Braunstein (born June 7, 1976), professionally known by his stage name Necro, is an American rapper and record producer from New York City. He founded his own independent record label Psycho+Logical-Records in November 1999. He was a brief member of Non-Phixion and was a member of hip-hop groups the Circle of Tyrants and Secret Society together with his older brother Ill Bill, as well as a part of hip-hop duo The Godfathers alongside Kool G Rap.

== Early life ==
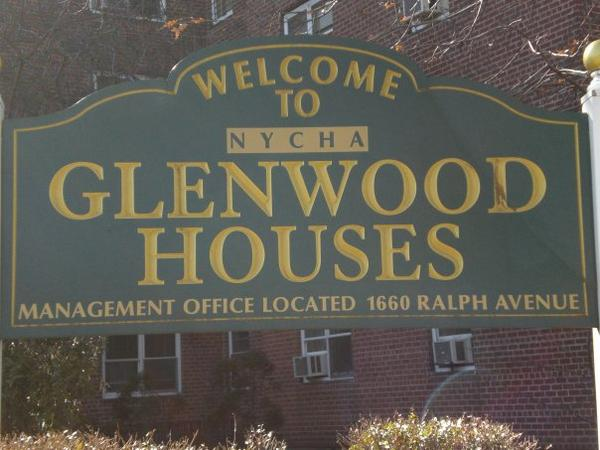
Glenwood Projects

Necro was born in Brooklyn, New York City, and grew up in the Glenwood Houses, where he lived for eight years from about six years old to age 14, when he moved to Canarsie, Brooklyn. Born into a Jewish family, he is the son of Israeli immigrants, with ancestry from Israel and Romania. Necro's father was a Romanian-born Israeli soldier and his mother an Orthodox baalat teshuva. When he was in high school he was popular among the hip-hop fans that went to his school until he got kicked out for fighting in the 10th grade and sold drugs to make money. He constantly read books.

He began his musical career at 11, playing in a death metal band named Injustice, before making a transition from heavy metal to hip-hop. In 1988, he started rapping after being influenced by his older brother, rapper Ill Bill. Necro derived his stage name from the Slayer song "Necrophiliac". Before that he called himself "Mad Mooney", which was a character from a Clive Barker book. He made his first demo in about 1990 and won a demo battle contest on the Stretch Armstrong and Bobbito show on WKCR-FM. In 1992 him and Ill Bill were extras in Black Moon's "Who Got da Props" music video. In about 1993, Necro started rapping full-time and made a demo called "Do The Charles Manson". In 1995, he proceeded to rap on the Wildman Steve and DJ Riz show WBAU 90.3FM.

== Stylistic characteristics ==
=== Lyrical style ===
Necro lists Kool G Rap as one of his biggest influences in terms of multi-syllabic rhyme structure and content, as well as LL Cool J, Big Daddy Kane, KRS-One, Rakim and the Geto Boys. Necro is also influenced by heavy metal/death metal lyrics, as well as gangster/horror movies, musicals and popular culture.

=== Musical style ===
Necro raps in a hip-hop sub-genre called horrorcore.

Necro refers to his music using the term "death rap" to describe his style of ultraviolent metal-inspired hip-hop and to distinguish himself from other genre labels within hardcore hip-hop. His music combines both death metal and traditional boom bap instrumentals with explicit lyrics about violence, death, the occult, drugs and sex.

=== Production ===
Necro is a self-taught musician and has been playing instruments since the age of ten. He started producing hip-hop instrumentals in 1989 by looping up records and bought an Ensoniq EPS in 1991. In the following years he produced instrumentals for artists such Non Phixion, Cage, Krist and Missing Linx, who all released independent singles. The first record he produced that received airplay was "No Tomorrow" by Non Phixion in 1996, put out on Searchlight Music/FatBeats Distribution.

The first wave of albums released on Necro's label were produced by Necro himself. This includes the debut solo albums of Non-Phixion members Ill Bill, Sabac Red and Goretex after he already produced 7 songs for Non Phixion's debut album The Future Is Now in 2002 and Non Phixion's "The Green CD' in 2004, and two albums for label member Mr Hyde. In 2009, an instrumental Necro produced in 1997 was used by Raekwon on his album Only Built 4 Cuban Linx... Pt. II for the song "Gihad", which also featured Ghostface Killah.

=== Equipment ===
- Unknown Ovation acoustic guitar (given to him by his uncle)
- Yellow B.C. Rich Warlock (used when he was in Injustice)
- Fender Jazz Bass (used on songs Necro played the bassline on)
- E-mu SP-1200 (robbed from a studio and eventually sold to MC Serch for $3500)
- Ensoniq ASR-10 (sampler he made most of his instrumentals on before permanently switching to Pro-Tools)
- Pro-Tools (went between Pro-Tools and his ASR-10 on the "Die!" and "Murder, Murder, Kill, Kill" albums before permanently using it)

"Suffocated to Death"
An example of Necro's blend of hip hop and metal

=== Death metal influence ===
Since the inception of his rap career Necro has been influenced by the genre of heavy metal, and more specifically death metal, which has altered his path into hip-hop. He has been quoted in interviews citing death metal as a key influence for his rhymes, Chuck Schuldiner's Death in particular.

Necro has said that he is heavily influenced by the thrash and death metal albums Kill 'Em All, Reign in Blood, Slowly We Rot, Leprosy, and Master of Puppets, and he has remarked that those albums take him back to "the '80s when shit was pure".

Necro rapped over a death metal blast instrumental on the track "Suffocated to Death by God's Shadow", with the drums being played by Mike Smith from the band Suffocation and has also collaborated with Scott Ian of Anthrax and Dave Ellefson of Megadeth, two members of the "Big 4", on the track "Evil Rules".

Necro references heavy metal acts in his rhymes as well. For instance, on "Underground", Necro states he will "penetrate your skull like a riff from Obituary's 'Slowly We Rot'" and quotes Metallica's "Master of Puppets" by saying "Taste me you will see / more is all you need / dedicated to / how I'm killing you". Over the years, Necro has increased his referencing and collaborations with underground metal acts, as evidenced by his 2004 album The Pre-Fix for Death, which features many references and collaborations with heavy metal musicians from Obituary, Hatebreed, Slipknot, and Voivod. In addition, Necro created his own group known as The Circle of Tyrants, named after a song by Celtic Frost. The Circle of Tyrants album also contains collaborations with artists from Testament, Exhumed, and Sepultura as well as song titles named after '80s thrash metal songs such as Slayer's "South of Heaven" and Metallica's "The Four Horsemen".

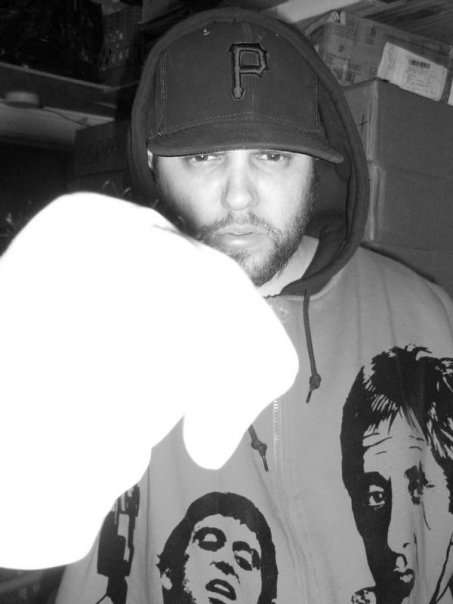

=== Concepts ===
Necro is known for releasing conceptual songs. His multilayered, wide-ranging concepts explore detailed acts of violence and unconventional sexuality. Songs have tackled topics such as the Manson murders: "Creepy Crawl", "Cockroaches", "Scalpel", "The 12 King Pimp Commandments", "Dead Body Disposal", "The Human Traffic King", "White Slavery", "I Need Drugs","Food For Thought", "S.T.D.", picking up women ("86 Measures of Game"), cannibalism ("Human Consumption"), suicide ("You Did It"), bondage and sex games ("EdgePlay"), watersports and micturition ("Piss"), life as a pimp ("Out the Pocket"), a revenge tale ("Some Get Back (Revenge)"), and war narratives ("First Blood").

Necro is a devoted fan of the 1983 film Scarface. Necro sampled the main character from Scarface, Tony Montana, in "Cockroaches". Necro has also rapped, "I live scarface scenes" in "Gory Days", and rapped Montana's infamous quote, "you fuck with me you fucking with the best", whilst sampling the quote simultaneously in "asBESTos". Necro also took the title from "Push It to the Limit" which appeared in the film's soundtrack and used the title for his own song "Push it to the Limit". Al Pacino's work besides Scarface plays a recurrent theme throughout Necro's work. Necro's collaboration with Kool G Rap The Godfathers' name is in reference to the film The Godfather, starring Al Pacino. In "asBESTos", Necro raps, "I'm completely rehabilitated, reinvigorated, reassimilated" which is taken directly from an Al Pacino quote in Carlito's Way.

=== Injustice ===
Necros' first band, Injustice, formed in 1986, joining as the guitarist after Bill switched to both bass and vocals. With this band, he played live shows with bands such as Napalm Death, Sepultura and Obituary at the Brooklyn club L'Amours. Before Necro joined the band, Injustice recorded their first demo called "The Cursed Earth" in 1989 and after he joined the band their second demo called "Inhuman Conditions" was recorded at Josh Silver's house in 1990 before splitting up the same year due to not securing a label contract. Jorge Rosado who went on to join Merauder in 1995 was the original singer of Injustice but was out of the band before Necro joined.

== Psycho+Logical-Records ==
Necro founded the independent record label Psycho+Logical-Records in November 1999. In the following years, Psycho+Logical-Records has released over 40+ albums all available digitally online on over 300+ outlets & physically in stores on CD & vinyl.

== Touring ==
Necro has performed live shows since the age of 11. In 2007, Necro played the Download Festival at Donington. Some of the groups he has opened for include Run DMC, Beatnuts, Sepultura, Kool Keith, Insane Clown Posse, Napalm Death & Biohazard. He has headlined for sold-out shows in some of NYC's mid-sized venues such as Brownie's, Wetlands, The Knitting Factory & SOB's. During the summer of 2009, Necro was a featured artist on the Rock the Bells tour appearing in Toronto, New York, Chicago, Boston, Los Angeles, Washington, D.C., and San Francisco. On January 1, 2017, Necro was invited to participate in the Juggalo March On Washington. He accepted on January 2, 2017.

== Directing and Necro films ==
Necro went to Brooklyn College for film for two years where he had access to film making equipment. His movie 187 Reasonz Y had an anti-cop theme with a police officer getting shot in the head at the end of the film. The film department was repulsed by Necro's visions, and he received no support from them.

Necro's film company has already released three direct-to-video features (187 Reasonz Y, The Devil Made Me Do It and the I Need Drugs music video).

=== Acting ===
Necro has taken classes on acting and worked to hone his skills in acting. In May 2009, he premiered in a short video-film titled, Triumph of the Kill acting the role of a serial killer clown. The short film was premiered on YouTube and MySpace.

He acted in the Safdie brothers' 2014 film Heaven Knows What, playing Skully, and their 2017 film Good Time, playing a drug dealer named Caliph.

== Controversy ==
=== Sounds of the Underground ===
Necro was part of the Sounds of the Underground tour in 2007, together with, among others, Gwar, Shadows Fall and Every Time I Die; however, he announced on July 25, 2007, that he would be dropping off the tour, citing incompatibility with the tour's audience:

"I decided to leave the tour collectively with my manager and booking agent (both tour organizers) because we felt the tour's demographic was not receiving hip hop well. I was facing hostile, disrespectful crowds and had lots of glass bottles thrown at me. It was making a lot of people in the tour crew nervous and there was concern someone might get hurt (NOT ME). It was also being suggested that maybe I tone down my live show and not antagonize the already antagonistic crowd. I couldn't roll with that as it's not my style. I was holding back enough as it is but there is a line. All the bands on the tour loved us and everyone behind the scenes knew we displayed major heart and never once got fazed by the hostility. We finished every show according to our 25 minute time slot. I will make one thing clear for the haters: we NEVER got booed OFF the stage. Not once. Yes a ton of emo kids booed us at every show, but we had a twenty-five minute set every night and we stayed on stage for every minute of it, and we represented. Every show had at least 200 NECRO fans in the pit tearing it up, and our meet and greets were incredible! It's just a shame these little kids are so closed-minded. The majority of the hate was coming from mop top emo sixteen-year-olds who have no clue who the originators of metal are, and didn't respect my 'rest in peace' chant to metal legends (Dime, Cliff, Chuck, Piggy, Sob). As far as the tour organizers and I are concerned, you are my peoples so it's all love and I'm thankful for the opportunity to prove I can represent in a variety of situations. This actually did a lot for me and is just one move in many my team will make to blow NECRO up".

=== Riot at Vancouver show ===
On Saturday, March 21, 2009, Necro had an appearance scheduled at a Vancouver, Canada nightclub (Richards on Richards). When promoters announced that the show was canceled at the last minute, fans became violent and chaos broke out. People began to throw bottles at the venue's DJ (DJ Sage of the Vancouver hip-hop radio show Urban Renewal Project).

=== Perth incident ===
On June 5, 2009, Necro was fined A$3,000 after breaking the jaw of a man in Perth, Australia. He was arrested at his hotel later that day, forcing the cancellation of his show at Perth's Hyde Park Hotel. He pleaded guilty to the crime.

=== Ani Difranco ===
On May 18, 2010, Necro released DIE! On July 17, 2010, Necro revealed (through his website's forum) that he is being sued by Ani Difranco due to sampling her song "Used to You" for the track "The Asshole Anthem". iTunes and Amazon subsequently removed the album from their stores, and Necro re-released the album without this track included.

=== Inspiration in Tori Stafford's murder ===
On March 23, 2012, jurors in the Tori Stafford murder trial in London, Ontario, were presented with a connection between Necro's music and Tori's admitted killer.

The court in the trial of Michael Rafferty heard testimony from convicted murderer Terri-Lynne McClintic that she listened to Necro the day she abducted Tori. Rafferty's defense attorney also noted similarities between the song "Garbage Bag" and letters McClintic had written when she was in a youth facility in 2007 and 2008; the letters described the hypothetical torture and murder of a person. At 5:12pm on April 8, 2009, the day of the murder, Terri-Lynne McClintic was positively identified as purchasing garbage bags. 8-year-old Tori Stafford had been found dead in a green garbage bag on July 19, 2009.

Necro issued a press statement on March 23, 2012, saying he does not support "anything that brings harm to children" and that he believes he has been unfairly blamed for the actions of some of his fans.

== Discography ==
=== Solo albums ===
- 2000: I Need Drugs
- 2001: Gory Days
- 2004: The Pre-Fix for Death
- 2005: The Sexorcist
- 2007: Death Rap
- 2010: Die
- 2012: Murder Murder Kill Kill
- 2018: The Notorious Goriest

=== Production albums ===
- 1998: Necro: Cockroaches EP
- 2000: Necro: I Need Drugs
- 2001: Necro: Gory Days
- 2003: Necro: Necro Presents: Brutality Pt. 1 (with Ill Bill, Mr Hyde, Goretex)
- 2004: Sabac Red: Sabacolypse: A Change Gon' Come
- 2004: Necro: The Pre-Fix for Death
- 2004: Ill BIll: "What's Wrong with Bill?"
- 2004: Mr Hyde: "Barn of The Naked Dead"
- 2004: Goretex: "The Art of Dying"
- 2005: Necro: The Sexorcist
- 2005: The Circle of Tyrants (with Ill Bill, Mr Hyde, Goretex)
- 2007: Necro: Death Rap (Ind 43, Heat 13)
- 2010: Necro: DIE! (R&B 48, Heat 19)
- 2012: Necro: Murder Murder Kill Kill EP
- 2013: "Once Upon a Crime" by The Godfathers (with Kool G Rap)

== Tours ==
- London Tour (2007)
- Australian/New Zealand Tour (2009)
- Happy Daze Tour (2010)
- The DIE! Tour (2010)
- Terminator Tour (2015)
- The F**k Commercial Rap (with Madchild) (2017)

== Festival appearances ==
- Gathering of the Juggalos (2007)
- Download Festival (2007)
- Hove Festival (2009)
- Rock the Bells (2009)
- Hip Hop Kemp (2010)
- Paid Dues (2010)

== Music videos ==
=== Solo videos ===
- 2000: I Need Drugs (from I Need Drugs)
- 2003: White Slavery feat. Ill Bill (from Brutality Part 1)
- 2005: The Prefix For Death (from The Prefix For Death)
- 2007: Mutilate the Beat (from Death Rap)
- 2008: Who's Ya Daddy? (from The Sexorcist)
- 2008: I Wanna Fuck (from The Sexorcist)
- 2009: The Human Traffic King (White Slavery Part 2) (from DIE!)
- 2011: Creepy Crawl (from Death Rap)
- 2011: DIE! (from DIE!)
- 2011: The Kink Panther (from DIE!)
- 2011: Sorcerer Of Death's Construction (from DIE!)
- 2011: No Concern (from Murder Murder Kill Kill EP)
- 2012: Jewish Gangsters (from Murder Murder Kill Kill EP)

=== Non-solo videos ===
- 1992 Who Got da Props - Black Moon (from Enta da Stage)
- 2002 Rock Stars - Non-Phixion (from The Future Is Now)
- 2004: Chasing the Dragon – Ill Bill feat. Necro (from What's Wrong With Bill?)
- 2004: The Crazies – Mr. Hyde feat. Ill Bill, Goretex and Necro (from Barn of the Naked Dead)
- 2007: Mechanix – Danny Diablo feat. Necro, Prince Metropolitan and Skinhead Rob

== Other projects ==
- 1996: 187 Reasonz Y (a short film directed by Necro and starring Chris Stanger)
- 1998: The Devil Made Me Do It (a short film directed by Necro and starring Gene Milman)
- 2003: Sexy Sluts: Been There, Done That (a pornographic DVD directed by Necro hosted by Jerry Butler and starring Lanny Barbie, Uncle Howie and others)
- 2004: The Green DVD (DVD that came as a bonus with Non-Phixion's "The Green CD")
- 2009: Triumph of the Kill (a short film directed by Bryan Andre, starring Necro)
- 2009: Personal Justice, a new crime re-enactment show airing on Investigation Discovery during the summer of 2009 (late July to early August). Necro will be in three upcoming episodes in three different roles.
- 2010: The Super Necro plays a crooked cop towards the end of the film.
- 2017: Necro plays Caliph in the film Good Time.

== See also ==
- Necro production discography
- Ill Bill
