= Sabac Red =

American rapper

- Also known as: Sabac
- Born: John Fuentes; February 7, 1977 (age 49); Guaynabo, Puerto Rico
- Origin: Brooklyn, New York City, U.S.
- Genres: Hip-hop
- Occupations: Rapper; audio engineer
- Years active: 1989–present
- Label: Psycho+Logical (former)
- Member of: Non Phixion; Secret Society
- Website: sabacred.com

John Fuentes (born February 7, 1977), professionally known by his stage name SaBac Red (or simply Sabac), is an American rapper and audio engineer from New York City. He is a member of hip-hop quartet Non Phixion and a former member of the supergroup Secret Society.

== Biography ==
John Fuentes was born in Guaynabo, Puerto Rico, along with his twin sister. His family moved to Brooklyn, New York City, when he was four years old. Fuentes was raised by his mom and grandmother who are Sicilian Italian. He grew up in the Gravesend section of Brooklyn neighboring Bensonhurst and Coney Island. Sabac began his journey into hip-hop as a b-boy and aspiring graffiti artist. At the age of 12 Sabac began exploring the art of emceeing. He would listen to the mix shows and memorise other MCs lyrics.

He would then make parodies of the songs using his own lyrics. Sabac would perform at block parties, school talent shows and anywhere there was music and a mic, constantly battling other MCs. At the age of 15, while attending Lafayette High School in Brooklyn, Sabac would promote parties and shows for artists like T La Rock, Audio Two, Big Daddy Kane, Greg Nice and many other hip-hop artists.

While in school, Sabac found himself getting into trouble with the law. He had to do community service at the CityKids Foundation where he ended up learning how to use his lyrics to express his pain and the things that were going on around him. He received training in facilitation, conflict management, public speaking, curriculum design and implementation and more. He began working at CityKids between school, touring and odd jobs. He worked his way up to become the director of programs at the CityKids Foundation. Sabac eventually resigned from CityKids in 2004. After high school, Sabac went to recording engineering school where he got a degree in recording engineering. Sabac went on to work for Wild Pitch Records as the college radio promoter. He also did street promotion for Nas' Illmatic and a number of artists in the early 1990s. In 1995 Sabac hooked up with Ill Bill and there begin the relationship of what is now the legacy of Non Phixion. Non Phixion is Ill Bill, Sabac Red, Goretex and DJ Eclipse. After 2 years signed to Geffen Records yielded nothing, Non Phixion continued releasing music independently and began touring the world on their own. They've performed in all of NYC's major venues and have done shows all over the US and the world. Some of the groups they have shared the stage with include Gang Starr, Run-DMC, Wu-Tang Clan, Rage Against the Machine, Mos Def, Hazen Street, Ludacris, Black Moon, Pharoahe Monch, Big Pun, Fat Joe, and more. Non Phixion have earned themselves a dedicated fan base across the United States, Europe and Japan. Sabac released his debut solo album Sabacolypse: A Change Gon' Come in 2004 on Necro's independent record label Psycho+Logical-Records.

He parted ways with Psycho+Logical-Records due to Necro being dissatisfied with his distribution deal with Koch Entertainment and not being able to properly promote Sabac's album after the release of his sophomore album The Ritual in 2008.

Fuentes is married and has a son named Lucas. He resides in San Francisco Bay Area, California.

== Discography ==
=== Solo and collaborative albums/mixtapes ===
- 2002: The Past, the Present and the Future Is Now (recorded 1996–2002) (with Non Phixion)
- 2002: The Future Is Now (with Non Phixion)
- 2004: Sabacolypse: A Change Gon' Come (Psycho+Logical-Records)
- 2004: The Green CD/DVD (with Non Phixion)
- 2008: The Ritual (Psycho+Logical-Records)
- 2010: Sabacolypse (Psycho+Logical-Records) as "Sabac"
