= R.A. the Rugged Man discography =

R.A. the Rugged Man is an American hip hop artist based in Suffolk County, Long Island. His discography consists of three commercial studio albums, two unreleased albums, one compilation album, numerous physical singles, and many guest appearances on other artists' tracks.

== Albums ==
=== Studio albums ===
Title	Album details
Die, Rugged Man, Die	Released: November 16, 2004; Label: Nature Sounds; Format: CD, LP, digital download
Legends Never Die	Released: April 30, 2013; Label: Nature Sounds; Format: CD, LP, cassette, digital download
All My Heroes Are Dead	Released: April 17, 2020; Label: Nature Sounds; Format: CD, LP, cassette, digital download

=== Compilation albums ===
Title	Album details
Legendary Classics Vol. 1	Released: October 27, 2009; Label: Green Streets; Format: CD, LP, digital download

=== Unreleased albums ===
Title	Album details
Night of the Bloody Apes	Released: Unreleased; Label: Jive; Format: CD
American Lowlife	Released: Unreleased; Label: Priority; Format: CD

== Singles ==
- 1993 "Bloody Axe"
- 1994 "Bloodshed Hua Hoo"
- 1996 "50.000 Heads" (feat. Sadat X) / "Smithhaven Mall"
- 1997 "Till My Heart Stops" (feat. Agallah) / "Flipside" (both later released on Soundbombing)
- 1999 "Stanley Kubrick" (on Soundbombing II) / "What da Fuck"
- 2001 "Don't Wanna Fuck With" (feat. Havoc) / "Even Dwarfs Started Small"
- 2004 "Lessons" / "How Low"
- 2005 "Chains" (feat. Masta Killa & Killah Priest) / "Black and White" (feat. Timbo King)
- 2006 "Uncommon Valor" (on Jedi Mind Tricks album Servants in Heaven, Kings in Hell)
- 2007 "Renaissance 2.0" (ft. Timbo King & Tragedy Khadafi on Hell Razah album Renaissance Child)
- 2009 "Supah"
- 2009 "Posse Cut" (feat. Hell Razah, JoJo Pellegrino, Remedy & Blaq Poet)
- 2010 "Mad Ammo" (on Celph Titled and Buckwild album ft. FT Nineteen Ninety Now)
- 2011 "Body the Beat" (on Maticulous album ft. Ruste Juxx, Rock from The Maticulous EP)
- 2011 "Crazy Man (Straitjacket Remix)" (on Block McCloud Crazy Man EP
- 2011 "High Ranking" (on Timbo King album From Babylon ToTimbuk2)
- 2012: "Zig Zag Zig" (on Rampage EP "Everyone Aint Loyal")
- 2012 "Crustified Christmas" (feat. Mac Lethal)
- 2012 "Coco Mango" remix with MF Doom
- 2012 "Open Relationship" with Psalm One
- 2013 "Thelonius King" with Blu & Tristate
- 2013 "The People's Champ" (feat. Rampage / prod. Apathy)
- 2014 "The Dumb Out" (on BIGREC album Doomsday)
- 2015 "The Greatest" (on Marcella Puppini album Everything Is Beautiful)
- 2016 "Bitch Slap" (on Reks album The Greatest X)
- 2016 "Industry Outcasts" (on Sadat X album Agua)

== Guest appearances ==
- "Break Walls Down" (WWF Aggression) (Chris Jericho Theme) (2000)
- "Rap for Real" (on Assassin album Touche d'Espoir) (2000)
- "Bottom Feeders" (on Smut Peddlers album Porn Again) (2001)
- "Homecoming Queen" (on Eastern Conference All Stars II) (2001)
- "On the Block (Golden Era)" (on Soundbombing III feat. L. Dionne) (2002) / Die, Rugged Man, Die
- "Kill It" (on D&D Project II feat. Agallah, Channel Live & Craig G) (2002)
- "Brawl" (on Eastern Conference All Stars III) (2002) / Die, Rugged Man, Die
- "Betcha Life" (on High & Mighty album Highlight Zone) (2003)
- "Ring Kings" (on HoStyle album One Eyed Maniac) (2004)
- "Give it Up" (on Wu-Tang Meets the Indie Culture feat. J-Live) (2005)
- "Dirty Money" (on El Axel album It Is What It Is) (2007)
- "Pignose" (on Matlock album Moonshine) (2007)
- "3 Kings" (on Big John album The Next Step feat. Kool G Rap) (2008)
- "Nosebleed" (on Vinnie Paz album Season of the Assassin) (2010)
- "Return of the Renaissance" (on Hell Razah album Heaven Razah) (2010)
- "High Ranking" (on Timbo King's album From Babylon to Timbuk2) (2011)
- "Razor Gloves" (on Vinnie Paz's album God of the Serengeti) (2012)
- "No Prints" (on Ruste Juxx and Kyo Itachi album "Hardbodie Hip Hop") (2012)
- "Smells Like" (on Jarren Benton album My Grandma's Basement) (2013)
- "Hold UP" (on Snowgoons album Black Snow) (2013)
- "Suffolk's Most Wanted" (on Diabolic album Fighting Words) (2014)
- "House of Games 2" (on Locksmith album A Thousand Cuts) (2014)
- "Floating Away (Remix)" - Wrekonize feat. R.A. + Jarren Benton) (2014)
- "And God Said to Cain" (on Jedi Mind Tricks album The Thief and the Fallen) (2015)
- "Tell 'Em" (on Chill Rob G album Chilled Not Frozen)
- "Lose Your Mind" - (Space Jazz) Michal Menert (2015)
- "Dark Streets" (on Malik B. album Unpredictable)
- "Good Villains Go Last" (on Czarface album Every Hero Needs...) (2015)
- "Back on Wax" (on Wax Taylor album By Any Beats Necessary) (2016)
- "Baba Barz" (on Psycho Les album Dank God, Vol. 1) 2016
- "Modern Slave" (on Chinese Man album Shikantaza) (2017)
- "Sleeper Cell" - (Digital Voodoo) The R.O.C. ft. Redd, Whitney Peyton (2017)
- "Dirty Old Man" (on King Magnetic album Everything Happens 4 a Reason) (2017)
- "Freedom Form Flowing" - Gift of Gab ft. A-F-R-O (2018)
- "Siegelsbach" (on Snowgoons album Gebrüder Grimm) (2018)
- "Do It Again" (on Whitney Peyton album Iridescent) (2018)
- "Stress" (on Daddy-O album From My Hood 2 U) (2019)
- "Air Strikes" (on Four Owls album Nocturnal Instinct) (2020)
- "Sleeping Limb" (on The KickDrums album Blurred Colors) (2020)
- "Arrest the Government" (Scrooge Owens ft. R.A., Mad Squablz, Napoleon Da Legend)
- "Know the Gospel (Remix)" iNTell, LDontheCut, Nuke LeFLeur (2021)
- "Glass Idols" (on Reverie album No Chaser) 2022
- "Stereo (Remix)" (Delphi)

== Videos ==
As lead performer
Year	Album title	Title	Director	Other featured artists
1994	Night of the Bloody Apes	Blooshed Hua Hoo	Frank Henenlotter	
2000	Die, Rugged Man, Die	I Should'a Never	Frank Hennenlotter (as François Pinky)	
2004	Die, Rugged Man, Die	Lessons	Frank Hennenlotter (as François Pinky)	
2004	Die, Rugged Man, Die	A Star is Born	Jed I. Rosenberg	
2009	Legendary Classics Volume 1	Posse Cut	Jed I. Rosenberg	Hell Razah, JoJo Pellegrino, Remedy, Blaq Poet
2012	N/A	Crustified Christmas	n/c	Mac Lethal
2013	Legends Never Die	The People's Champ	Brood Baby	
2013	Legends Never Die	Learn Truth	Clay Patrick McBride	Talib Kweli
2013	Legends Never Die	Holla-Loo-Yuh	Mike Quill	Tech N9ne, Krizz Kaliko
2013	Legends Never Die	The Dangerous Three	Mike Quill	Brother Ali, Masta Ace
2013	Legends Never Die	Sam Peckinpah	Michael M. Bilandic Johnny Zito	Vinnie Paz, Sadat X
2014	Legends Never Die	Still Get Through The Day	Douglas Quill	Eamon
2014	Legends Never Die	Definition of a Rap Flow	RA The Rugged Man	Amalie Bruun
2015	Legends Never Die	Media Midgets	Douglas Quill	
2015	Legends Never Die	Tom Thum	RA The Rugged Man	Tom Thum
2016	Legends Never Die	Bang Boogie	Gabe Gasparinatos	
2016	N/A	Look What You Made Me Do	The Jokerr	
2019	N/A	The Return	The Jokerr	
2020	All My Heroes Are Dead	Legendary Loser	Jonas Govaerts	
2020	All My Heroes Are Dead	Wondering (How to Believe)	Douglas Quill	David Myles (musician)
2020	All My Heroes Are Dead	All My Heroes Are Dead (The Introduction)	Jonas Govaerts The Jokerr Enkrypt Los Angeles	
2020	All My Heroes Are Dead	Gotta Be Dope	The Jokerr	A.F.R.O., DJ Jazzy Jeff
2020	All My Heroes Are Dead	All Systems Go	Jonas Govaerts Jaak De Digitale	
2020	N/A	Wet Ass P-Word (WAP Remix)	Street Heat	
2021	All My Heroes Are Dead	Who Do We Trust ?	Street Heat	Immortal Technique
2021	All My Heroes Are Dead	E.K.N.Y. (Ed Koch New York) (B.K.N.Y. Mix)	Street Heat	Inspectah Deck, Timbo King
2021	All My Heroes Are Dead	Golden Oldies	Douglas Quill	Slug (rapper), Eamon
2021	All My Heroes Are Dead	First Born	n/c	Novel
2021	N/A	Montero (Lil Nas X Remix)	Sadi Kantürk	
2022	All My Heroes Are Dead	Malice of Mammon	David Sakolsky	Chuck D
2022	All My Heroes Are Dead	Dragon Fire	Linn Marie Christensen Shane Alexander Caldwell	Ghostface Killah, Masta Killa, Kool G Rap, Xx3eme
2022	All My Heroes Are Dead	Hate Speech	Linn Marie Christensen Shane Alexander Caldwell	

As featured artist
Year	Artist	Title	Director	Other featured artists
2001	Smut Peddlers	Bottom Feeders	The Rugged Man	
2008	Hell Razah	Renaissance 2.0	n/c	Tragedy Khadafi, Timbo King
2010	Jedi Mind Tricks	Uncommon Valor	Tom Vujcic	
2010	The DRP	Dem Hoes	n/c	Slumlord
2010	Vinnie Paz	Nosebleed	Ethan Blum	Amalie Bruun
2010	Celph Titled & Buckwild	Mad Ammo	Jed I. Rosenberg	
2011	Maticulous	Body the Beat	Nicholas Heller Houston Yang	Ruste Juxx, Rock of Heltah Skeltah
2011	Block McCloud	Crazy Man (Straightjacket Remix)	Mark Carranceja	Celph Titled
2011	Timbo King	High Ranking	Ethan Blum RA The Rugged Man Jed I. Rosenberg	
2011	Ruste Juxx & Kyo Itashi	No Prints	Gustav	
2011	Hell Razah	Return of the Renaissance	Yoni Arava	
2012	Psalm One	Open Relationship	The Rugged Man	
2012	Klee MaGoR	Armz Economy	Pasha Kulakov	Benny Brahmz
2012	Clementino	Animals	Valerio Suarez	
2012	Rampage	Zig Zag Zig	n/c	
2013	Blu	Thelonious King	Nicholas Heller Ruffmercy	Tristate
2014	Locksmith	House of Games 2	Brian Storm Locksmith	
2014	BIGREC	The Dumb Out	n/c	
2015	Chill Rob G	Tell 'Em	Anthony DeRose	
2015	Malik B. & Mr. Green	Dark Streets	Mr. Green	Amalie Bruun
2016	Marcella Puppini	The Greatest	Infinate Ear	
2016	Reks	Bitch Slap	Myster DL Munchdawg	
2016	Sadat X	Industry Outcast's	Will Tell Brian Delaney	Thirstin Howl III
2016	Kool Savas	Wahre Liebe	Kool Savas Thaizzier Mouzza	
2016	Psycho Les	Ba Ba Barz	Grade A	
2017	Gift of Gab	Freedom Form Flowing	The Jokerr	A.F.R.O.
2018	Snowgoons	Siegelsbach	SirQLate Gigo Flow	
2018	R.O.C.	Sleeper Cell		Redd, Whitney Peyton
2019	Snak the Ripper	Knuckle Sandwich	Stuey Kubrick	
2019	Daddy-O	Stress	Andre Cole	
2020	Scrooge Napoleon	Arrest the Government	Mo Stafford	Napoleon Da Legend, Mad Squablz
2020	The Four Owls	Air Strike	The Astroknight	
2020	The Kickdrums	Sleeping Limb	Tillavision	
2021	iNTeLL	Know the Gospel	MrHawkins	
2022	Reverie & Louden	Glass Idols	Reverie	
2023	Delphi	Stereo (Remix)	Anja Ullberg The Jokerr Maja Kin	Reverie

Cameo only
Year	Artist	Title	Director	Other featured artists
1993	Yaggfu Front	Busted Loop	n/c	
2004	Masta Killa	Old Man	n/c	RZA, Ol' Dirty Bastard
2006	Sadat X	Throw The Ball	Peter Agoston	
2007	Havoc	I'm The Boss	n/c	
2012	Nova Rockafeller & Ruste Juxx	Procastinatin	Mike Quill	(also editor)

As director
Year	Artist	Title	Other featured artists
2012	Idle Warship	Driving Me Insane	
