= Legendary Classics Volume 1 =

Legendary Classics vol. 1

Compilation album by R.A. the Rugged Man
- Released: October 27, 2009
- Genre: Hip-hop
- Length: 52:32
- Label: Green Streets
- Producer: Marc "Nigga" Nilez, Ayatollah, Stoupe the Enemy of Mankind, Havoc, Buckwild, Dirtman, Preservation, Shuko, Dev One, The Purist, Capital The Crimelord, Loptimist, Big Earth

R.A. the Rugged Man chronology
Die, Rugged Man, Die (2004)	Legendary Classics vol. 1 (2009)	Legends Never Die (2013)

Legendary Classics Volume 1 is a compilation album by American rapper R.A. the Rugged Man, released on 27 October 2009, on Green Streets Entertainment. The album is a collection of unreleased and rare tracks from R.A. the Rugged Man. The album features The Notorious B.I.G., Havoc, Kool G Rap, Buckwild, Ayatollah, Jedi Mind Tricks, Sadat X, Akinyele, Tragedy, J-Live, Human Beatbox Bub and others. "Uncommon Valor", featuring hip-hop group Jedi Mind Tricks, was originally released on their 2006 album Servants in Heaven, Kings in Hell.

== Track listing ==
No.	Title	Producer(s)	Length
1.	"Give It Up" (featuring J-Live)	Preservation	3:50
2.	"Supa"	Shuko	3:26
3.	"Renaissance 2.0" (featuring Hell Razah, Tragedy Khadafi & Timbo King)	Dev One	3:32
4.	"Windows of the World" (featuring Ayatollah & Dynasty The Emp)	Ayatollah	2:33
5.	"Uncommon Valor" (featuring Jedi Mind Tricks)	Stoupe	4:05
6.	"Who's Dat Guy" (featuring Havoc of Mobb Deep)	Havoc	3:37
7.	"L.I.'s Finest"	The Purist	2:56
8.	"Stanley Kubrick"	Capital The Crimelord	3:35
9.	"Cunt Renaissance" (featuring The Notorious B.I.G.)	Marc "Nigga" Nilez	2:34
10.	"3 Kingz" (featuring Kool G. Rap & Big John)	Loptimist	2:54
11.	"Smithhaven Mall"	Dirtman	3:38
12.	"Posse Cut" (featuring Hell Razah, Jojo Pellegrino, Remedy & Blaq Poet)	Big Earth	3:44
13.	"What the Fuck" (featuring Akinyele)	Marc "Nigga" Nilez	3:54
14.	"Poor People"	Marc "Nigga" Nilez	3:52
15.	"50,000 Heads" (featuring Sadat X)	Dirtman	3:25
16.	"Effin' Yo' Bitch"	Marc "Nigga" Nilez	4:06
17.	"Every Record Label Sucks Dick"	Buckwild	3:44
