= Heavy Metal Kings =

American hip hop duo

- Also known as: HMK
- Origin: Philadelphia, Pennsylvania, Brooklyn, New York
- Genres: Hip hop
- Years active: 2010–present
- Label: Enemy Soil
- Members: Vinnie Paz; Ill Bill
- Website: jmthiphop.com

Heavy Metal Kings is an underground hip hop duo which consists of veteran rappers Ill Bill (formerly of Non Phixion, currently of La Coka Nostra) and Vinnie Paz (Jedi Mind Tricks and Army of the Pharaohs). In 2006, Ill Bill was featured on the single "Heavy Metal Kings" by hip hop duo Jedi Mind Tricks, released through Babygrande Records. The single was released in a limited edition blue vinyl pressing, with every copy signed by group vocalist Vinnie Paz.

"Heavy Metal Kings" is the lead single from the group's fifth album, Servants in Heaven, Kings in Hell. The song features a sample from "Boiling Rage (Estuans Interius)" by German composer Carl Orff, taken from his famous cantata Carmina Burana, and a vocal sample from "Front Lines (Hell on Earth)" by Mobb Deep for the chorus. The song's music video was released shortly before the album's release, and featured guest appearances from the group's DJ, DJ Kwestion, and R.A. the Rugged Man. Ill Bill and Vinnie Paz have since combined forces to form a group of the same name, "Heavy Metal Kings," and record a full self-titled album released in April 2011, through Enemy Soil/Uncle Howie.

== History ==
=== 2010–2011: Heavy Metal Kings ===
Ill Bill and Vinnie Paz have since combined forces to form a group of the same name, "Heavy Metal Kings," and record a full self-titled album to be released April 5, 2011, through Enemy Soil/Uncle Howie. "Keeper Of The Seven Keys" produced by up and coming producer, C-Lance, is the first track from the new Heavy Metal Kings album. The album features production from DJ Muggs, Ill Bill, Shuko, Sicknature, C-Lance, Grand Finale, Jack of All Trades, Junior Makhno, Vherbal, and DJ Premier protégé Gemcrates alongside a cast of emcees, including Reef the Lost Cauze, Slaine, Crypt the Warchild, Q-Unique, and Sabac Red.

=== 2012–present: Future Work announcements ===
In 2011, an associated producer posted that an album featuring Ill Bill & Vinnie Paz with DJ Muggs (whom Ill Bill had previously collaborated with on an album entitled Kill Devil Hills), entitled Heavy Metal Kings vs. DJ Muggs was in the works. However, in an interview with Ill Bill from 2016, he made it known that this album is no longer being worked on.

In 2017, Heavy Metal Kings released their second album titled Black God White Devil.

== Discography ==
Studio albums

- Heavy Metal Kings (2011)
- Black God White Devil (2017)

== See also ==
- "Heavy Metal Kings" (song)
- Heavy Metal Kings (album)
