= 20th Special Operations Squadron =

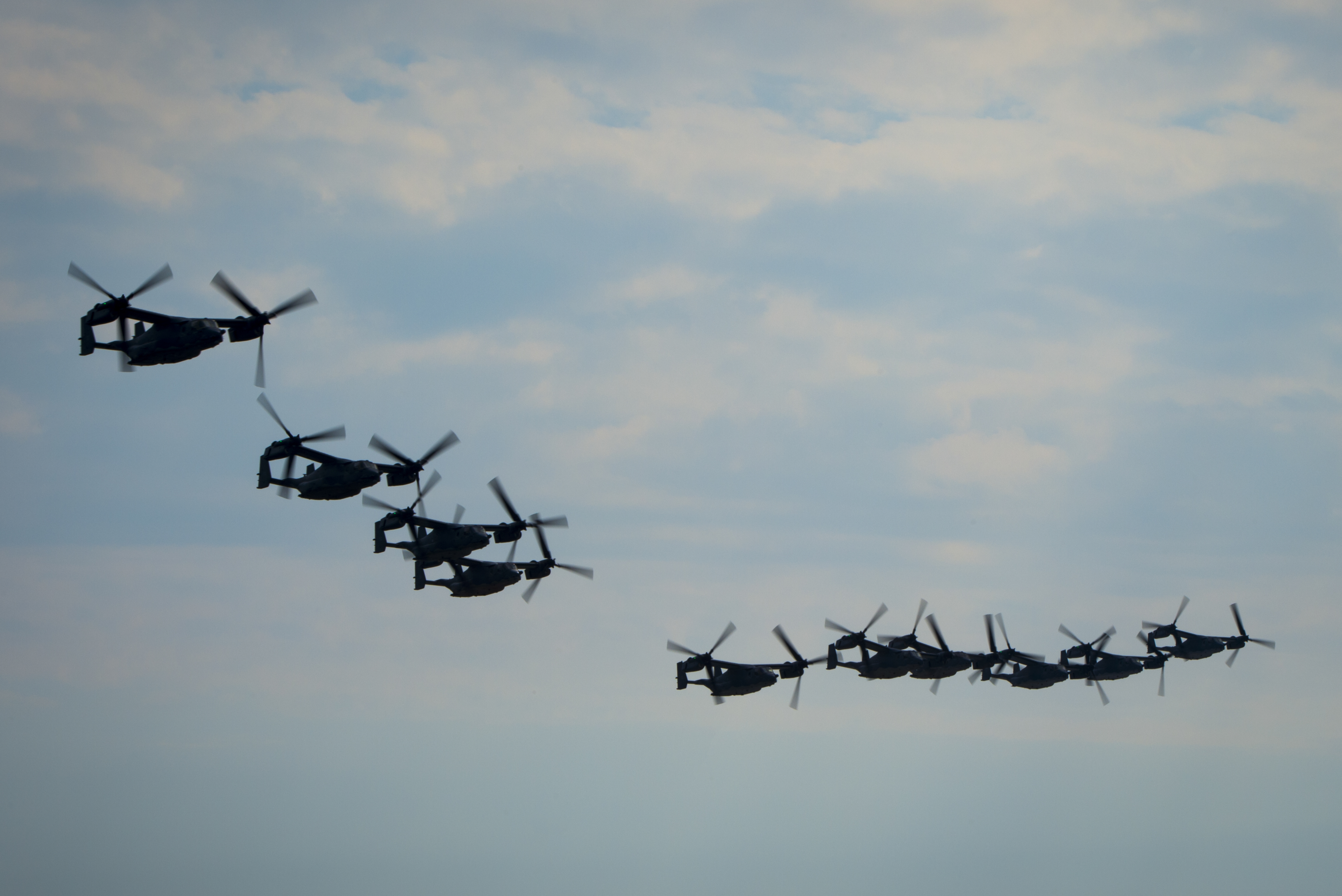
- Squadron CV-22 Osprey in formation in formation with Ospreys from the 8th Special Operations Squadron
- Active: 1942–1945; 1956–1960; 1965–1972; 1976–present
- Country: United States
- Branch: United States Air Force
- Role: Special Operations
- Part of: Air Force Special Operations Command
- Garrison/HQ: Cannon Air Force Base
- Nickname: Pony Express/Green Hornets
- Engagements: China-Burma-India Theater; Vietnam War; Desert Storm; Kosovo War; Afghanistan War
- Decorations: Presidential Unit Citation Gallant Unit Citation Air Force Outstanding Unit Award with Combat "V" Device Air Force Outstanding Unit Award Republic of Vietnam Gallantry Cross with Palm

Insignia
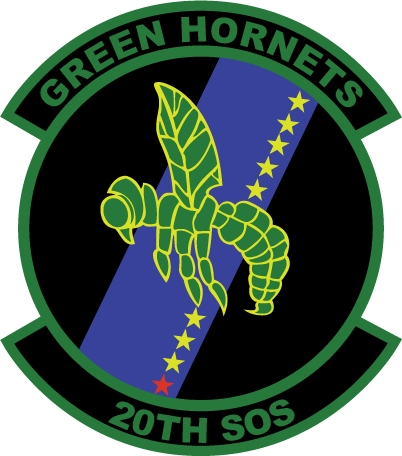
- 20th Special Operations Squadron emblem (approved 9 December 1993)

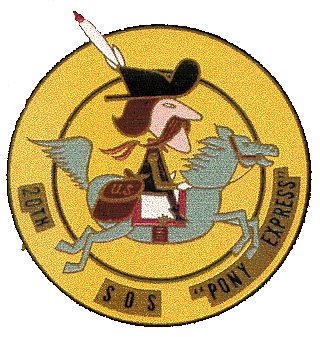
- 20th Special Operations Squadron unofficial Pony Express emblem

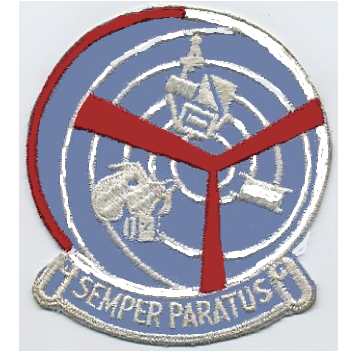
- 20th Helicopter Squadron emblem

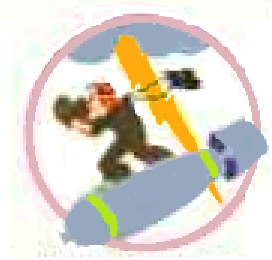
- 20th Observation Squadron emblem (approved 31 October 1942

The 20th Special Operations Squadron is part of the 27th Special Operations Wing at Cannon Air Force Base, New Mexico. It operates Bell Boeing CV-22 Ospreys on special operations missions. It traces its history back to the activation of the 20th Observation Squadron (Light) at Savannah, Georgia, in March 1942.

The squadron conducts day or night low-level penetration into hostile enemy territory, to accomplish clandestine infiltration and exfiltration, aerial gunnery support and resupply of special operations forces throughout the world.

== History ==
=== World War II ===
The 20th Tactical Reconnaissance Squadron trained for aerial reconnaissance from March 1942 to December 1943, then went on to fly combat missions in the China-Burma-India Theater from 31 January 1944 to 5 May 1945.

=== Light transportation ===
The 20th Helicopter Squadron was activated in 1956 to perform traditional helicopter missions with Piasecki H-21 Workhorses for the Tactical Air Command. It was inactivated in 1960.

=== Vietnam War ===
In 1965, the unit's Sikorsky CH-3 helicopters were transferred to Southeast Asia and the squadron began participating in unconventional warfare and special operations in Laos and North Vietnam as Operation Pony Express.

In 1967, the 20th was joined by the Bell UH-1 Huey helicopters formerly assigned to Project Lucky Tiger and the Hueys became known as the Green Hornets. The "Green Hornets" supported Special Operations in South Vietnam and Cambodia. In August 1969 the Pony Express CH-3E's were transferred to the 21st Special Operations Squadron at Nakhon Phanom Royal Thai Air Force Base, and the Pony Express ceased to exist. The heritage of the 20th was carried on by the 20th UH-1's Green Hornets.

Aircraft and crew losses

- 31 March 1967, MAJ Robert L Baldwin, piloting UH-1F Tail No 65-07932 was shot and killed in Laos. he was posthumously awarded the Air Force Cross.
- 26 November 1968, CAPT James P. Fleming earned the Medal of Honor for the rescue of a 7-man Special Forces team near Đức Cơ, South Vietnam.
- 27 November 1968, UH-1F Tail No 65-07942 operating from Ban Me Thuot East Airfield was shot down near Phu Nhai Village, Rotanokiri Province, Cambodia, 16 km west of Duc Co, South Vietnam while trying to infiltrate a Special Forces team. The Crew Chief, SSgt Gene P. Stuifbergen and four of the Special Forces team were trapped in the burning wreckage. Five of the ten men on board were rescued and medevaced out. All others were initially listed as KIA-BNR. However, after multiple attempts to recover their remains over the next three days failed due to the intensity of fire from NVA forces guarding the LZ, a fourth mission, led by SGM Chuck Hurley, eventually did succeed in recovering some remains which were evacuated to Duc Co. Technical Sergeant Victor R. Adams was awarded the Air Force Cross for rescuing the copilot and a passenger.
- 3 January 1969, UH-1F Tail No 63-13164 operating from Ban Me Thuot was making its second attempt to extract a Special Forces patrol in Cambodia. As they came to a hover above the trees, enemy fire struck the fuel cells setting the aircraft on fire. They were able to accelerate the aircraft and attempted a landing in a small jungle clearing, but the engine failed just short of the clearing and the helicopter crashed into the trees. The crew chief, Sgt Ronald Zenga, was pinned under the aircraft and died in the ensuing fire.
- 17 January 1969, Pony Express 20 CH-3C Tail No 62-12582 operating from Udorn Royal Thai Air Force Base crashed while on a TACAN service mission to Lima Site 36 in Laos. Three of the crew were killed.
- 26 March 1969, UH-1F Tail No 63-13158 operating from Ban Me Thuot crashed and burned near Dục Mỹ, north of Nha Trang, South Vietnam. The aircraft experienced severe vibration and auto-rotation was initiated, but during the descent the main rotor severed the tail boom. All 5 crewmen were killed.
- 13 April 1969, Capt James O. Lynch, piloting UH-1F, AF Ser. No. 65-07937, operating from Ban Me Thuot was shot and killed while extracting a reconnaissance team near Pleiku, South Vietnam.
- 14 March 1970, UH-1P, AF Ser. No. 64-15491, operating from Ban Me Thuot was shot down while supporting a LRRP mission near Duc Lap, South Vietnam. The pilot, Capt Dana A. Dilley, was killed in the crash. R.A. the Rugged Man tells the story of his father's (Sgt John A. Thorburn) part in this crash in the song "Uncommon Valor: A Vietnam Story".
- 19 March 1970, UH-1P, AF Ser. No. 65-07944, operating from Ban Me Thuot was shot down near Darlac, South Vietnam. The pilot, copilot and a gunner were killed in the crash.
- 25 September 1970, UH-1P, AF Ser. No. 64-15484, operating from Ban Me Thuot hit trees while turning to avoid a mid-air collision with a VNAF CH-34 near Quang Duc, South Vietnam. The aircraft subsequently caught fire and the pilot and a gunner were killed in the crash.
- 4 December 1971, a UH-1N operating from Ban Me Thuot came under fire near Saigon. The gunner, Sgt Thomas E. Fike, was killed.

The Green Hornets continued to perform unconventional warfare missions for seven years, until inactivation in 1972.

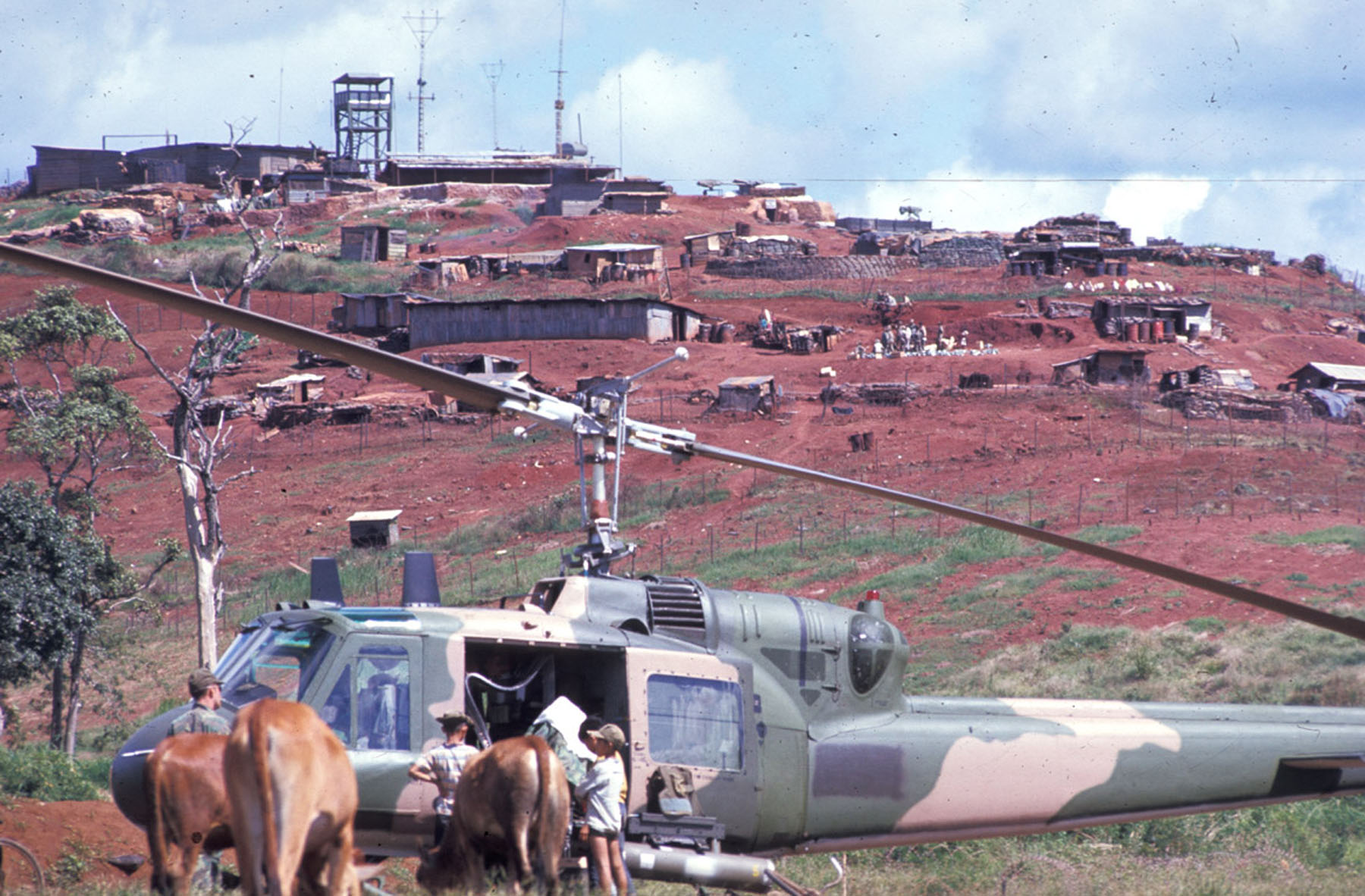
SOS Huey in Laos

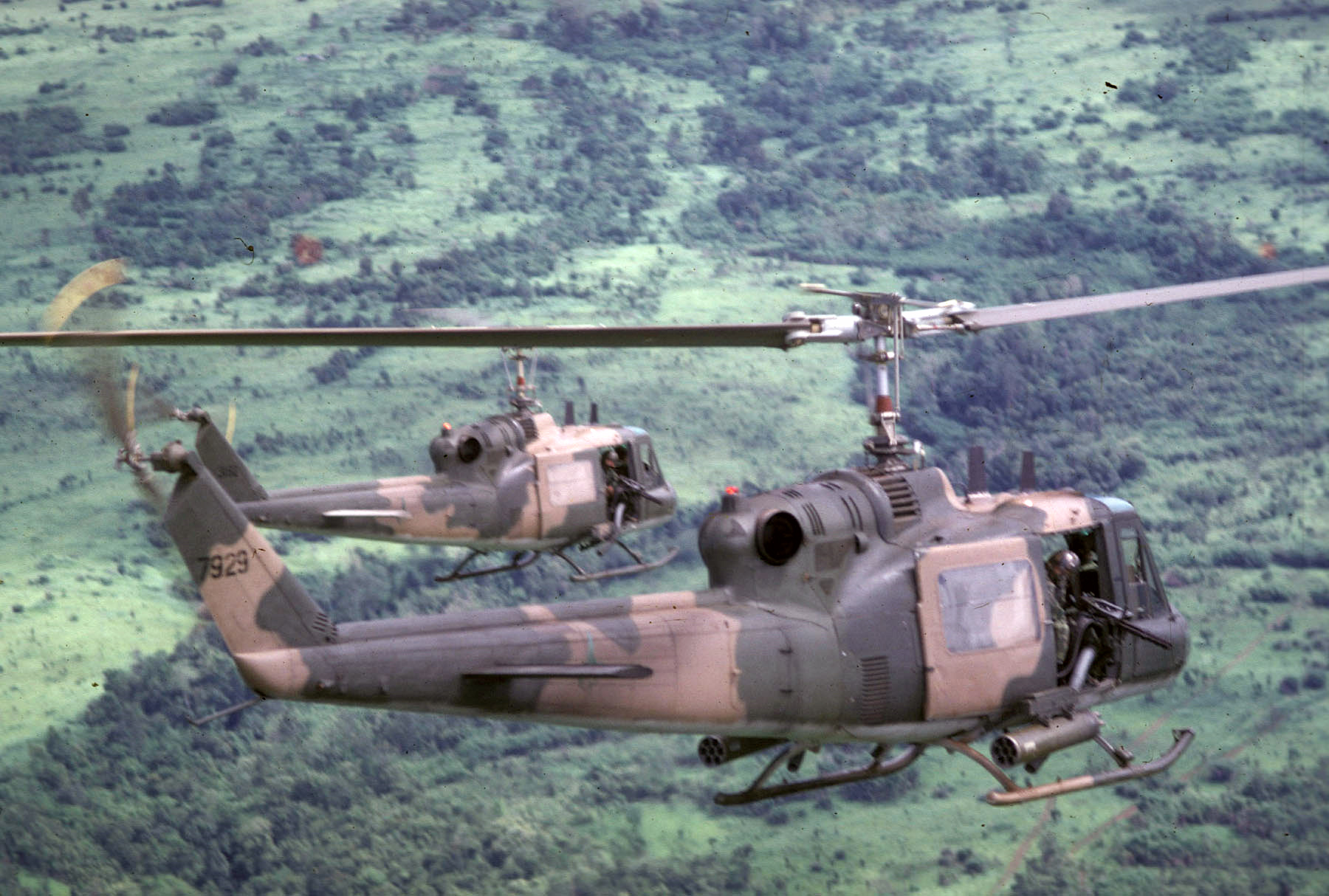
SOS UH-1Ps over Cambodia

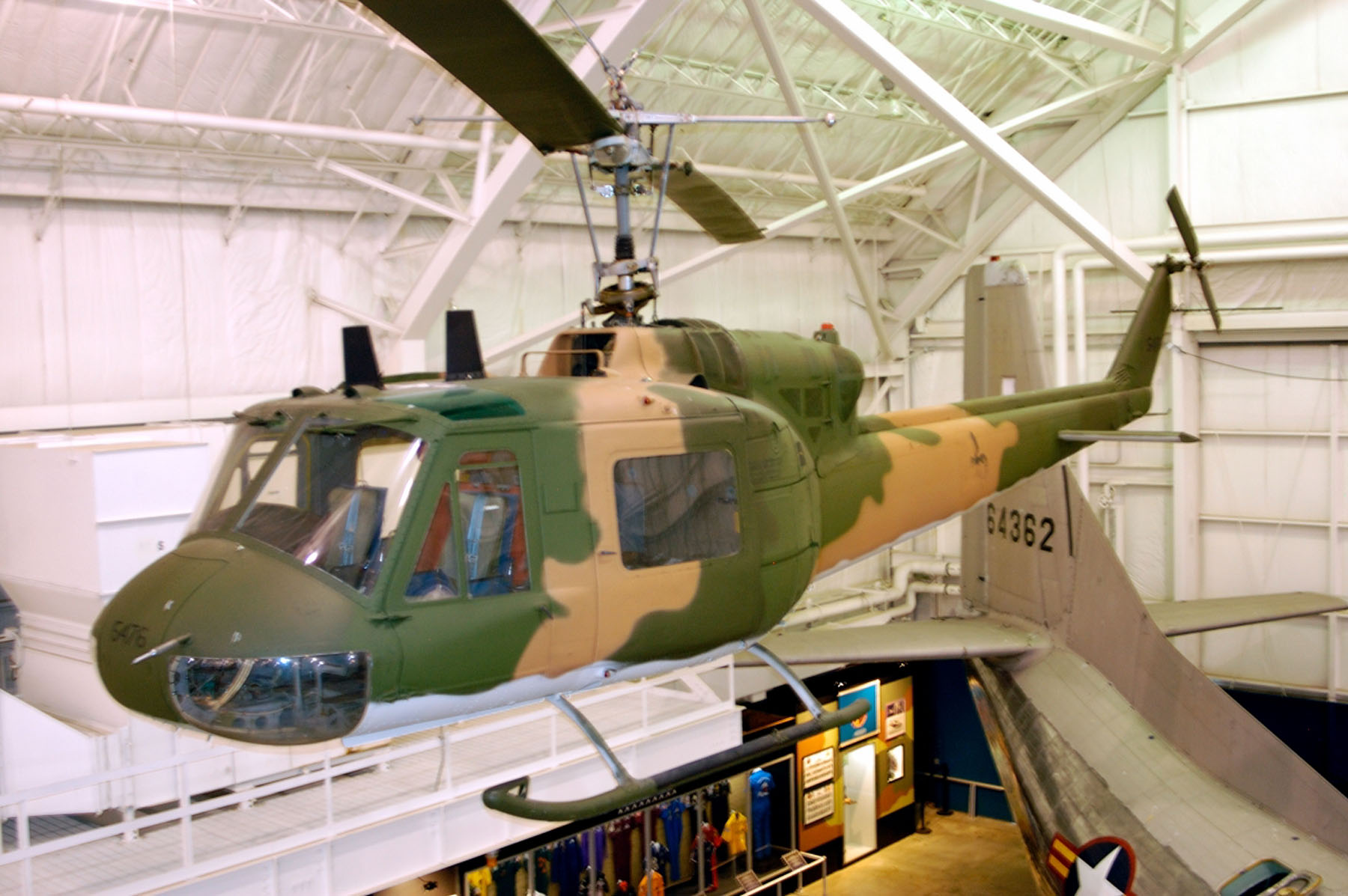
UH-1P formerly operated by the 20th SOS on display at the National Museum of the United States Air Force

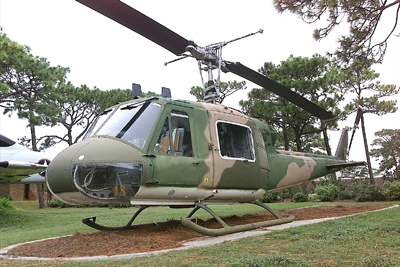
UH-1P Tail No 64-15493, probably used by 20th SOS, at Hurlburt Field

=== 1976 Reactivation ===
Upon reactivation in 1976 at Hurlburt Field, the unit mission remained unconventional warfare and special operations using UH-1N gunships and CH-3Es. The HH-53H Pave Low replaced the CH-3E in 1980, providing a long range, heavier lift helicopter capability. "The Air Force's newly operational fleet of nine HH-53H Pave Low CSAR helicopters was abruptly transferred to the special operations forces in response to the failed Iranian hostage rescue attempt and the lack of dedicated long-range vertical lift platforms." The crews used the Pave Low avionics to arrive over target on time and undetected, where they performed terminal operations wearing night vision goggles.

In 1983, the UH-1Ns began two years of support as part of then Vice President George Bush's South Florida Drug Enforcement Task Force, participating in Operation Bahamas, Antilles and Turks (BAT). The Op BAT Hueys flew hundreds of over-water missions from the Bahamas before transferring to Homestead Air Force Base, Florida in 1985.

In 1986, the 20th flew the specially equipped and highly capable Sikorsky MH-53 Pave Low and started flying the upgraded MH-53J Pave Low III in 1988.

In December 1989, members of the 20 SOS were mobilized as part of a joint task force for Operation Just Cause, in Panama.

The 20th was among the first units to deploy to Operation Desert Shield; in August 1990, squadron crew members and aircraft led U.S. Army AH-64 Apaches in the air strike, opening the air war in Operation Desert Storm. A 20 SOS crew rescued U.S. Navy Lieutenant Devon Jones, logging the first successful combat rescue of a downed Airman since the Vietnam War. The crew earned the MacKay Trophy for their accomplishments.

Squadron personnel deployed in support of Operation Restore Democracy in Haiti, providing support to a National Command Authority resolution. Members of the 20th, participating in operations in Bosnia and Herzegovina, went into harm's way in attempting a rescue of two downed French crewmen, receiving two Purple Heart Medals and the Cheney Award.

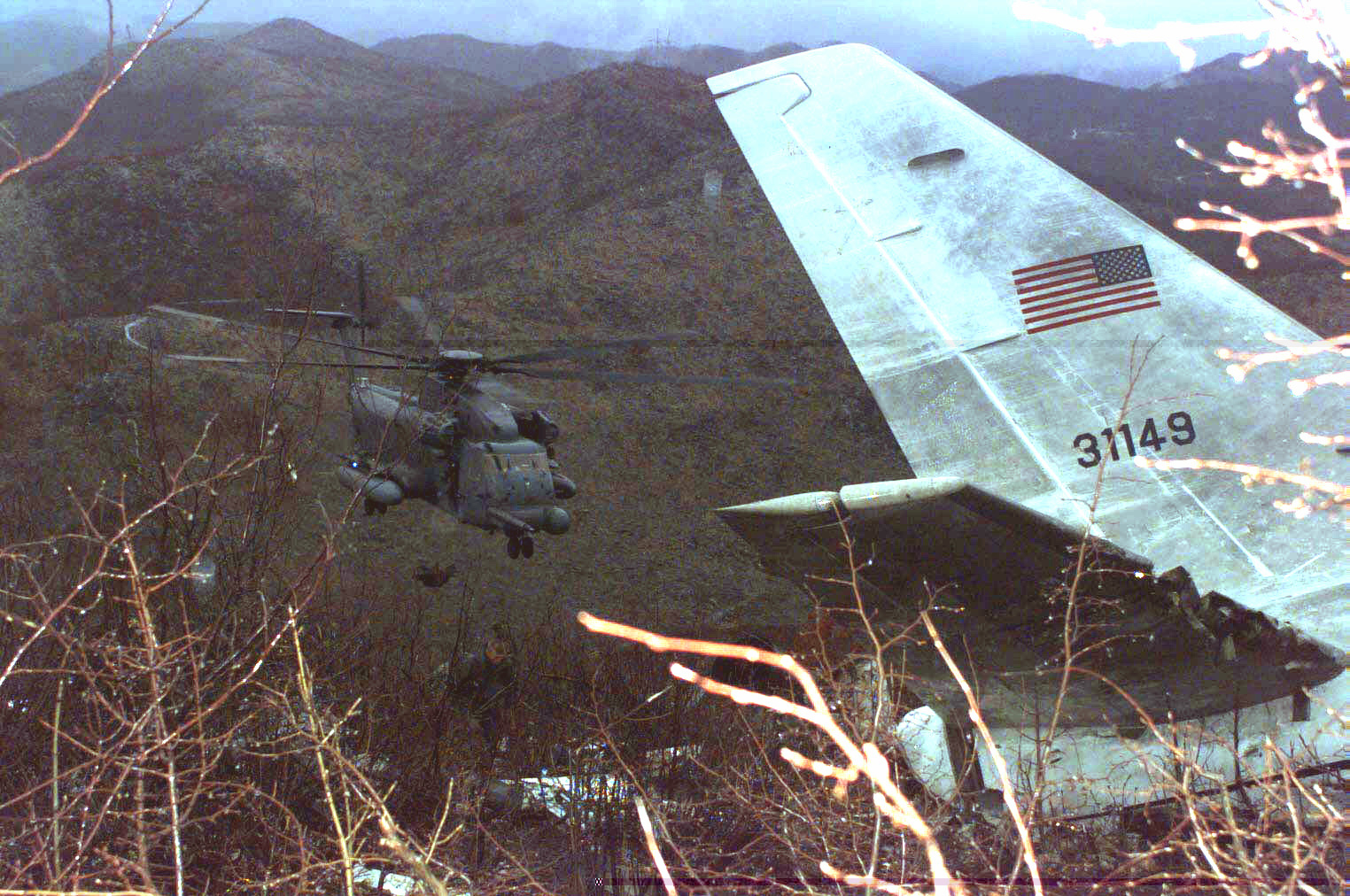
USAF MH-53J Pave Low helicopter over wreckage of the USAF CT-43A approximately 3 kilometers north of the Dubrovnik Airport in Croatia, 4 April 1996

20 SOS crews were also involved in the search and rescue operations resulting from the CT-43 crash in which Commerce Secretary Ron Brown and his party died. These same crews deployed shortly thereafter to support the American Embassy evacuations in Monrovia, Liberia – airlifting more than 2,000 evacuees to safety. The squadron deployed crews and aircraft to Southwest Asia in support of United States Central Command and Operation Desert Thunder in February 1998. The Pave Low gave the theater commander a night, all-weather personnel recovery capability, unparalleled in the U.S. inventory.

In 1999, the Pave Low III's were upgraded to the MH-53M Pave Low IV. The M model brought more technology and superior avionics to the mission, furthering the capabilities and resources available to the crews flying the helicopter. These new technologies were battle tested during Operation Allied Force when the 20 SOS rescued downed pilots from a Lockheed F-117 Nighthawk and a General Dynamics F-16 Fighting Falcon, earning two Silver Stars and numerous Distinguished Flying Crosses.

In 2001, the 20th was quick to respond in the initial recovery efforts at The Pentagon and Ground Zero in New York City supporting Operation Noble Eagle. Additionally, the 20th rapidly deployed in support of Operation Enduring Freedom, engaging in the fight against terrorism in Afghanistan with continuing endeavors into Iraq as the Global War on Terror continues.

To date, the Green Hornets have flown direct assaults on numerous high-profile targets and effected the rescue and exfiltration of hundreds of US and allied soldiers. Included among these actions are the daylight medevac of 32 injured soldiers in the midst of a battle and the rescue of a downed aircrew deep in hostile territory, which earned the squadron its second MacKay Trophy.

== Lineage ==
20th Tactical Reconnaissance Squadron

- Constituted as the 20th Observation Squadron (Light) on 5 February 1942

Activated on 2 March 1942
Redesignated 20th Observation Squadron on 4 July 1942
Redesignated 20th Reconnaissance Squadron (Fighter) on 2 April 1943 (Note: This squadron is not related to the 20th Reconnaissance Squadron, later the 410th Bombardment Squadron or the 20th Reconnaissance Squadron, later the 20th Intelligence Squadron.)
Redesignated 20th Tactical Reconnaissance Squadron on 11 August 1943 (Note: This squadron is not related to the 20th Tactical Reconnaissance Squadron, later the 20th Intelligence Squadron.)
Inactivated on 27 November 1945
Consolidated with the 20th Special Operations Squadron on 19 September 1985

20th Special Operations Squadron

- Constituted as the 20th Helicopter Squadron on 24 February 1956

Activated on 9 July 1956
Discontinued and inactivated on 8 March 1960

- Activated on 24 September 1965 (not organized)

Organized on 8 October 1965
Redesignated 20 Special Operations Squadron on 1 August 1968
Inactivated on 1 April 1972

- Activated on 1 January 1976

Consolidated with the 20th Tactical Reconnaissance Squadron on 19 September 1985

=== Assignments ===
- Air Force Combat Command, 2 March 1942
- Army Air Forces, 9 March 1942
- 76th Observation Group (later 76th Reconnaissance Group, 76th Tactical Reconnaissance Group), 12 March 1942
- III Reconnaissance Command, 23 August 1943
- Army Air Forces, India-Burma Sector, 26 December 1943 (attached to 5306th Photographic and Reconnaissance Group (Provisional), 26 December 1943, Tenth Air Force, 17 January 1944)
- Tenth Air Force, 7 March 1944 (attached to 5320th Air Defense Wing [Provisional] March–May 1944)
- 8th Photographic Group (later 8 Reconnaissance Group), 25 April 1944
- Army Air Forces, India-Burma Theater, October–27 November 1945
- Eighteenth Air Force, 9 July 1956 (attached to 314th Troop Carrier Wing)
- Ninth Air Force, 1 September 1957 – 8 March 1960 (attached to 314th Troop Carrier Wing to 16 July 1959, 354th Tactical Fighter Wing after 16 July 1959)
- Pacific Air Forces, 24 September 1965 (not organized)
- 2nd Air Division, 8 October 1965 (attached to 6250th Combat Support Group after c. 10 December 1965)
- 14th Air Commando Wing (later 14 Special Operations Wing), 8 March 1966)
- 483d Tactical Airlift Wing, 1 September 1971 – 1 April 1972
- 1st Special Operations Wing, 1 January 1976
- 1st Special Operations Group (later 16th Operations Group, 1st Special Operations Group, 22 September 1992
- 27th Special Operations Group, 1 December 2009 – present

=== Stations ===
- Army Air Base Savannah, Georgia, 2 March 1942
- Pope Field, North Carolina, 28 March 1942
- Vichy Army Air Field, Missouri, 14 December 1942
- Morris Field, North Carolina, 8 May 1943
- Key Field, Mississippi, 31 August–8 November 1943
- Camp Anza, California, 11–c. 17 November 1943
- Bombay, India, 26 December 1943
- Camp Deolali, India, 28 December 1943
- Gushkara, India, 5 January 1944 (flight operated from Kisselbari, India after 6 March 1944, detachment at Tingkawk Sakan, Burma after 21 May 1944)
- Kisselbari, India, 26 March 1944 (operated from Dinjan, India, 1 May–20 June 1944)
- Tingkawk Sakan Airfield, Burma, 21 June–c. 10 November 1944 (detachment at Myitkyina, Burma, 10 July–c. 25 August 1944)
- Myitkyina, Burma, c. 9 November 1944 (flight operated from Akyab, Burma, 12 April–22 May 1945)
- Nagaghuli Airfield, India, c. 20 April 1945
- Dergaon, India, 6 July 1945
- Piardoba Airfield, India, September–4 November 1945
- Camp Kilmer, New Jersey, 26–27 November 1945
- Sewart Air Force Base, Tennessee, 9 July 1956
- Myrtle Beach Air Force Base, South Carolina, 16 July 1959 – 8 March 1960
- Tan Son Nhut Air Base, South Vietnam, 8 October 1965
- Nha Trang Air Base, South Vietnam, 15 June 1966
- Tuy Hoa Air Base, South Vietnam, 5 September 1969
- Cam Ranh Air Base, South Vietnam 25 September 1970 – 1 April 1972
- Hurlburt Field, Florida, 1 January 1976
- Cannon Air Force Base, New Mexico, 1 December 2009 – present

=== Aircraft ===
- Douglas A-20 Havoc (1942–1943)
- Douglas DB-7 Boston (1942–1943)
- Stinson L-1 Vigilant (1942–1943)
- Piper L-4 Grasshopper (1942–1943)
- Republic P-43 Lancer (1942–1943)
- Curtiss P-40 Warhawk (1942–1945)
- L-5 Sentinel (1942–1945)
- North American B-25 Mitchell (1942–1945)
- North American P-51 Mustang (1945)
- Piasecki H-21 (1956–1960)
- Sikorsky CH-3 (1965–1969, 1976–1980)
- Bell UH-1 Huey (1967–1972, 1976–1985)
- Sikorsky MH-53 Pave Low (1980–2008)
- Bell Boeing CV-22 Osprey (2008 – )
