= The Kickdrums =

American hip-hop production team

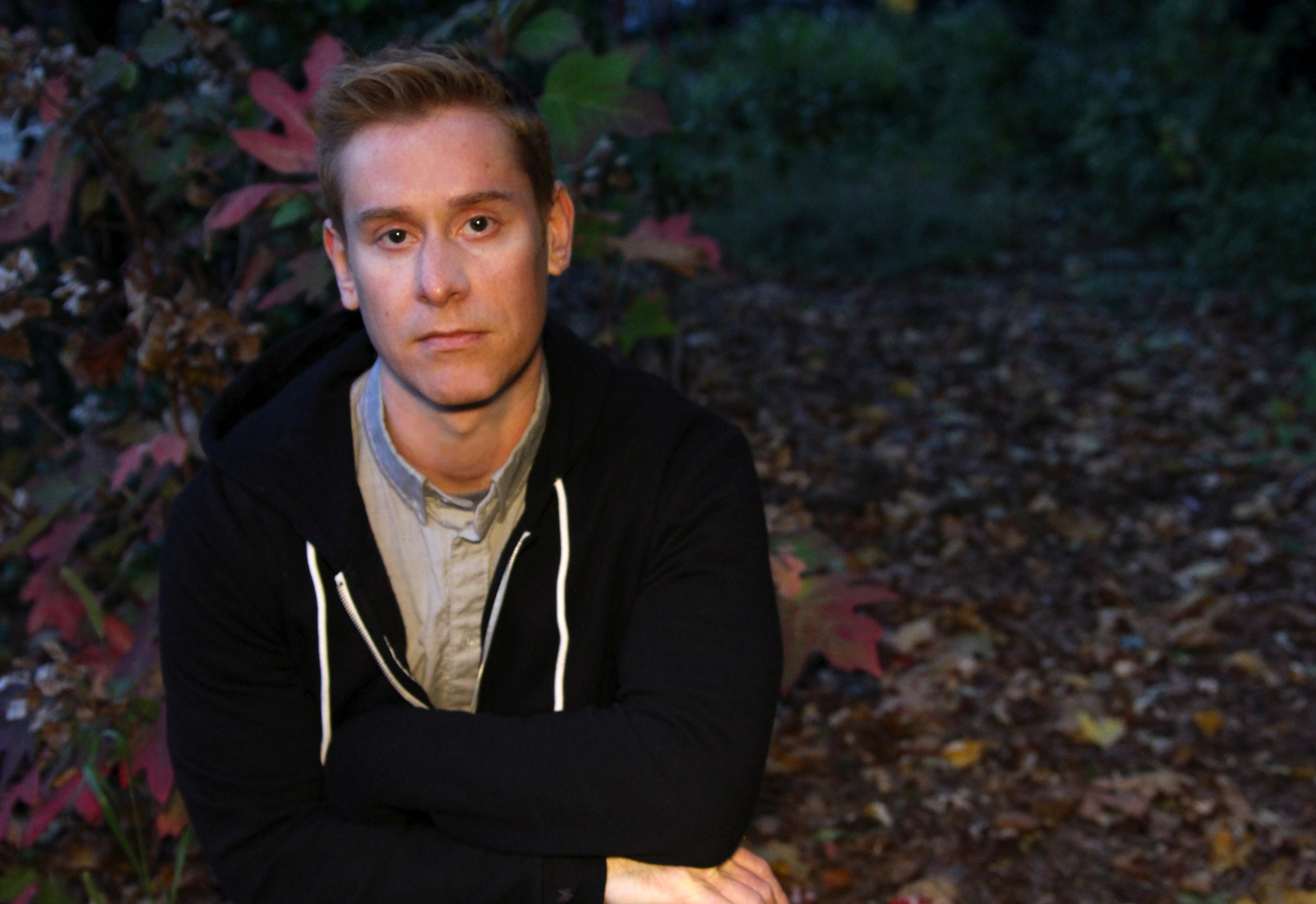
- Alex Fitts of The Kickdrums

Background information
- Origin: Cleveland, Ohio, U.S.
- Genres: Hip hop; rock
- Occupation: Record producer
- Instruments: Drums; drum machine; keyboard; sampler
- Years active: 2005–present
- Labels: Hopeless; 24West; Last Gang
- Members: Alexander Fitts
- Past members: Matt Penttila
- Website: thekickdrums.net

The Kickdrums is singer-songwriter and record producer Alexander Fitts, originally from Cleveland, Ohio. It was formerly a production duo also including DJ Matt Penttila.

== Career ==
Indie rock singer-songwriter Alex Fitts started off as a Cleveland-based record producer, working with local hip-hop acts but took off when his music caught the ears of big-name rappers, looking for production that blended hip-hop and indie rock styles. He and his production partner, Matt Penttila, found work with artists such as 50 Cent, John Legend, and Kid Cudi, and did remixing for Kanye West, Adele, Ben Harper, and Peter Bjorn and John.

At the same time, the duo began working on their own hybrid of indie rock and hip-hop, releasing an EP titled Just a Game in 2009, and continued with an album titled Meet Your Ghost in 2011 with Last Gang Records.

Penttila left the band after this release and Fitts struck out on his own, turning The Kickdrums into a one-man band and trading in any vestiges of hip-hop for electronic-tinged singer-songwriter-influenced indie rock. After signing with Hopeless Records, an EP titled Still Logic was released in July 2013, followed by an album titled Thinking Out Loud in October of that year.

Fitts' music has been used in a variety of TV shows, movies and games including The Sims, Teen Wolf, The Wire, Suits, Bloodline, Chuck, Cougar Town, Lovesick, Demoted, Famous in Love, The Unicorn, Temptation Island, ESPN, the BBC as well as ads for Ralph Lauren and Beats by Dre.

Albums including The Kickdrums' production have sold over 7.5 million copies worldwide. Fitts has cited The Prodigy, Wu-Tang Clan and Trent Reznor as influences.

== Production discography ==
=== 2005 ===
- "When Death Becomes You" – M.O.P and 50 Cent on the Get Rich Or Die Tryin' Movie Soundtrack

=== 2006–2007 ===
- Cash on Delivery – Ray Cash of Columbia Records
1. "Smokin' & Leanin"
2. "She A G"
3. "Dope Game"
4. "Here I Stand"
- Money" Mixtape- (King Chip) Chip The Ripper
1. "Keep on Pushing"
2. "Hello World"
3. "Get It Girl" (feat. Fat Al)
- Pop The Trunk – DJ Kay Slay & Greg Street Featuring Chamillionaire, Yung Joc and Papoose from The Champions: North Meets South album on Koch

=== 2008 ===
- "Melt My Heart to Stone Remix" - Adele & Mick Boogie featuring Big Pooh on 1988 Mixtape
- "Move On" – Slaughterhouse
- Sky High: The Kanye Remix Project – Kanye West, DJ BENZI, PLAIN PAT
1. "We Major"
2. "Good Morning" (feat. Big Sean)
- "Sky High" – Kid Cudi featuring Kanye West

=== 2009–2010 ===
- "T.G.I.F." (featuring Chip tha Ripper) – Kid Cudi on A Kid Named Cudi Mixtape and Man on the Moon album Deluxe
- "Waiting for the End" (Kickdrums Remix) – Linkin Park from the "A Thousand Suns" album Warner Brothers records
- "Like It's Her Birthday" (Kickdrums Remix) – Good Charlotte from the "Cardiology" album Capital records
- "Nothing to Worry About" (Kickdrums Remix) (Featuring Wale, Young Chris, Rhymefest – Peter Bjorn and John from the "Living Thing" album Wichita Records

=== 2011 ===
- "2 The Beat" – Scarface (Featuring B James & Monk Kaza)
- "Perfect World" – The Kickdrums (Featuring The Rza)
- "Lay There And Hate Me" – Ben Harper – (Kickdrums Remix)
- "Come And Go" – Alan Wilkis (Featuring The Kickdrums) (RJD2 Remix) –

=== 2012 ===
- "Ridin" – A$AP Rocky featuring Lana Del Rey
- "Half Naked & Almost Famous" – Machine Gun Kelly
- "Stereo" – Machine Gun Kelly from album "Lace Up"
- "Icey Techno" – Dee Goodz Featuring SZA from the "Higher" EP
- "Follow The Leaders" - Album - The Kickdrums - Meet Your Ghost Records
1. "Thieves In The Choir" featuring Casey Veggies
2. "Want My Blood" featuring DZ Deathrays & Rockie Fresh
3. "My Life" featuring Machine Gun Kelly
4. "Naked"
5. "The Way It Goes" featuring Big Pooh
6. "The Last Goodbye" featuring Backwood Jones
7. "Traces"
8. "Death Wish" featuring Maluca Mala & Mr. Muthafuckin eXquire
9. "Safer Than Heaven"
10. "Whatever You'd Like featuring Gilbere Forte
11. "Come Come (KD Remix) by Hot As Sun - featuring Freddie Gibbs
12. "Come And Go" by Alan Wilkis featuring The KickDrums

=== 2013 ===
- "So What" – K Flay from "What If It Is" EP – RCA Records
- "Free Tune" – Deniro Farrar from "The Patriarch II" album

=== 2014 ===
- Music for Cartoon Network pilot show "Ridin with Burgess"
- "Super Soaker" – Duckwrth – Them Hellas Records

=== 2015 ===
- "Sleeping Limbs" (Kickdrums Remix) – From Indian Lakes – Triple Crown Records
- "Outcast" (Fake Guns Remix) – Mainland – 300 Entertainment
- "Nowhere" - Album - Duckwrth and The Kickdrums – Them Hellas Records
1. "No Where (Intro)"
2. "Magic Bullet"
3. "Indica La Roux (Ft. Miloh Smith)"
4. "Naruto"
5. "Psycho"
6. "N O W H E R E"
7. "Lambo, Pt. 1"
8. "Lambo, Pt. 2"
9. "Unagi"
10. "Skank"
11. "Bandcamp"
12. "I Got A Lazer"
13. "Now Here (Outro)"

=== 2016 ===
- "Man's Man" – SWIMM – Hit City Records
- "Take That" – CRUISR – Vagrant Records
- "Don't Worry" – Rockie Fresh featuring Rebekah Jordan

=== 2017 ===
- "Lights Out" EP - Shiny Wet Machine – (Sizzy Rocket and The Kickdrums) of Diet Punk Records
1. "Euphoria"
2. "Stun Gun"
3. "Spectrum"
4. "Chemicel"
5. "Hospitals"
- "Lights Out" B-Sides EP - Shiny Wet Machine – (Sizzy Rocket and The Kickdrums) of Diet Punk Records
1. "Breakfast"
2. "Coma"
3. "Spine"
4. "Gash"

=== 2018 ===
- "Sentimental Porno" – SWIMM
1. "First Time"
2. "True Romance"
3. "Barbara Walters"

=== 2019 ===
- "Grow EP" – Mia Gladstone – 22Twenty Records
1. "Baby Dont Worry"
2. "Hold It Down"
3. "Revolutionize"
4. "Love U"
5. "Feel It"
- "Aging Frontman EP" – Vinnie Caruana – Big Scary Monsters Records
1. "Alone"
- "Scars" – Sick Individuals (co-written) – One Seven Music / Sony Music

=== 2020 ===
- "Nite Therapy EP" – Nite Therapy – Lo Editions / Universal Production Music
- "R.A. The Rugged Man: All My Heroes Are Dead"
1. "All My Heroes Are Dead (The Introduction)"
2. "Golden Oldies" (feat. Atmosphere and Eamon)
3. "Angelic Boy"
4. "Living Through a Screen (Everything Is a Lie)" (feat. The Kickdrums)
5. "The Slayers Club" " (feat. Ice-T, Vinnie Paz, Brand Nubian, Chris Rivers, Chino XL, M.O.P. and Onyx)

=== 2022 ===
- "Losing Sunlight EP" – Oh Bummer! – If This Then Records
1. "Mirrors"
2. "Beautiful Day"
3. "Going Out Of My Mind"
4. "It Felt Real"
5. "The Right Thing"
6. "Losing Sunlight"
- "Nite Therapy II EP" – Nite Therapy – Indie Sonics / Warner Chappell Music
- "Ride The Wave" – Doc Robinson

=== 2023 ===
- "Psych Indie Pop" – Alexander M. Fitts – The Home Of Happy / BMG Production Music
- "The Color EP" – Doc Robinson & The Kickdrums –
1. "The Color"
2. "The Otherside"
3. "Ride The Wave"
- "Pretty Orange EP" – Werdperfect & The Kickdrums
1. "Pretty Orange"
2. "Potato Chip"
3. "No Vacancy"
4. "Wrong Number"
- "Stupid EP" – Oh Bummer –
1. "Swimming"
2. "The Bird and the Dog"
3. "Listen Up"
4. "Talk About It All The Time"

== Discography ==
=== Studio albums ===
- Meet Your Ghost [co-produced with Alan Wilkis aka (Big Data)] (2011)
- Thinking Out Loud (co-produced with Andros Rodriguez) (2013)
- Blurred Colors (2020)
- The Ghost Tapes (2021)
- ZigZags (2023)

=== Compilations ===
- Smash the System (2009)

=== EPs ===
- Just A Game EP (2009)
- Inspiration For Conversation EP (2013)
- Still Logic EP (2013)
- Breathe Again EP (2015)

== Videography ==
- "Just A Game" by Rik Cordero
- "Things Work Out" by Rik Cordero
