= Bad Biology =

2008 American black comedy horror film

- Directed by: Frank Henenlotter
- Written by: Frank Henenlotter; R.A. the Rugged Man
- Produced by: R.A. the Rugged Man
- Starring: Charlee Danielson; Anthony Sneed
- Cinematography: Nick Deeg
- Edited by: Albert Cadabra; Frank Henenlotter; Scooter McCrae
- Music by: Josh Glazer; Prince Paul
- Production company: Bad Biology
- Distributed by: Media Blasters; Fever Dreams
- Release dates: April 4, 2008 (Philadelphia International Film Festival); January 26, 2010 (United States)
- Running time: 85 minutes
- Country: United States
- Language: English

Bad Biology is a 2008 American black comedy horror film directed by Frank Henenlotter. Produced by rapper R.A. the Rugged Man, it stars Charlee Danielson and Anthony Sneed as sexually unfulfilled people who are drawn together because of their mutated genitalia. The film received generally positive reviews, and was released on DVD in the United Kingdom in 2009, and in the United States in 2010.

== Plot ==
Jennifer, a photographer, has seven clitorises and can only be satisfied by very intense sex which results in the death of her partners. When she orgasms she gives birth to mutated creatures that she abandons.

Jennifer's co-worker offers to get access to a mansion for a special photo shoot of a rap group. The mansion's owner, Batz, has a deformed, drug addicted penis. When Batz gets an erection after seeing one of the models at the photo shoot, Jennifer witnesses this and becomes obsessed with him, convinced that he is the only man who can satisfy her. She steals his keys and later breaks into his house where she witnesses him bring home a prostitute and films them fucking.

Although Batz's sexual encounter with the prostitute does not last long, the prostitute continues to orgasm for more than forty-five minutes afterwards. Jennifer, aroused by this, returns the next night, only to discover that Batz's penis has remarkably left his body and is having sex with numerous women throughout the city.

The penis eventually returns, slowly dying and suffering from drug withdrawal. Batz wants to let his penis die, sick of caring for it, but Jennifer gives the penis drugs, rejuvenating it, and causing Batz to overdose. The penis enters Jennifer and she orgasms. The penis then falls out of Jennifer, dead. Jennifer collapses and gives birth to a half-human, half-penis mutant baby before dying.

== Cast ==
- Charlee Danielson as Jennifer
- Anthony Sneed as Batz

The film has cameos by J-Zone, Wu-Tang Clan affiliate Remedy, Penthouse Pet Krista Ayne, Reef the Lost Cauze, Vinnie Paz, Staff Sergeant John A. Thorburn, film director James Glickenhaus, and Playboy model Jelena Jensen.

== Production ==
Henenlotter and Thorburn wrote the script together. Henenlotter acted as director and Thorburn the producer. The two met when Thorburn recruited Henenlotter to direct a rap video. As opposed to his earlier project that were either canceled or compromised, Bad Biology allowed Henenlotter and Thorburn complete creative freedom due to Thorburn's investment of funds. Danielson was dating Thorburn at the time and requested to be cast. In order to make sure she was committed, Henenlotter tried to scare her off, but he was glad when she stayed with the project, as he said that she was "absolutely perfect" for the part. Sneed, who was cast as the male lead, found out about the project from a post on Craigslist. Sneed was initially rejected because of his physique, which Henenlotter did not think was close enough to that of a junkie. Sneed promised to lose enough weight to look the part. When he followed through and lost 30 pounds in 30 days, Henenlotter was impressed enough to cast him.

== Release ==
Bad Biology premiered at the 2008 Philadelphia Film Festival, where Henenlotter received the Phantasmagoria award. It was theatrically released in 25 cities. Revolver Entertainment released the UK DVD on March 2, 2009, and Media Blasters released it on DVD in the US on January 26, 2010. On February 13, 2010, Henenlotter appeared in New Jersey to promote the DVD release.

== Reception ==
Rob Nelson of Variety called it a "so-bad-it's-rad" film that will please Henenlotter's cult following. Bloody Disgusting rated it 4.5/5 stars and wrote, "Bad Biology is simply the most entertaining gore film I've seen in a very long time." Andy Mauro of Dread Central rated it 3.5/5 stars and wrote, "Small complaints aside, fans of Frank Henenlotter should definitely seek Bad Biology out." Justin Decloux of Twitch Film wrote, "Keep your expectations in check, because while Bad Biology is a fun gross out chuckle fest, it's by no means the mondo madness that word of mouth has made it out to be." Matthew Sorrento of Film Threat rated it 3.5/5 stars and wrote, "Bad Biology is more out-of-control than anything the director has done." Ian Jane of DVD Talk rated it 3.5/5 stars and wrote, "It's not the best starting place for those new to his filmography and he's definitely made better pictures, but the rampant spirit of lunacy and comedic perversion that earned him his following has not dulled." Daryl Loomis of DVD Verdict wrote, "This film has just about everything you'll want to see in B-grade splatter."
