= Night of the Bloody Apes =

Night of the Bloody Apes may refer to:

- Night of the Bloody Apes (film), the 1972 English-language version of the 1969 Mexican horror film La Horripilante bestia humana
- Night of the Bloody Apes (album), an album by R.A. the Rugged Man
