= Legends Never Die (R.A. the Rugged Man album) =

Studio album by R.A. the Rugged Man

Studio album by R.A. the Rugged Man
- Released: April 30, 2013
- Recorded: 2009–2013
- Genre: Hip-hop
- Length: 57:05
- Label: Nature Sounds
- Producer: Apathy, Buckwild, C-Lance, Dev-1, Jussi Jaakola, Marc Niles, Mr. Green, Shuko, Vherbal, Will Tell

R.A. the Rugged Man chronology
| Legendary Classics Vol. 1 (2009) | Legends Never Die (2013) | All My Heroes Are Dead (2020) |

Singles from Legends Never Die
- 1. "The People's Champ" Released: February 20, 2013; 2. "Learn Truth" Released: March 26, 2013

Legends Never Die is the second studio album from New York City hip-hop artist R.A. the Rugged Man. The album was released on April 30, 2013, by Nature Sounds. It is the follow-up to 2004's Die, Rugged Man, Die. The album features guest appearances from Talib Kweli, Krizz Kaliko, Masta Ace, Brother Ali, Tech N9ne, Hopsin, Vinnie Paz, Eamon, Sadat X among others. The album's production was handled by Buckwild, Ayatollah, Apathy and Marco Polo among others.

== Background ==
The first single from the album, "The People's Champ", produced by Apathy, was released on February 20, 2013. On April 9, 2013, the music video was released for "The People's Champ". On April 29, 2013, the music video was released for "Learn Truth" featuring Talib Kweli. On June 18, 2013, the music video was released for "Holla-Loo-Yuh" featuring Tech N9ne and Krizz Kaliko. In July 2013 Nature Sounds announced that a limited edition cassette version of the album would be released.

== Critical response ==
Professional ratings
Aggregate scores
| Source | Rating |
|---|---|
| Metacritic | 84/100 |
Review scores
| Source | Rating |
| AllMusic | 4/5 stars |
| HipHopDX | 4/5 stars |
| RapReviews | 8/10 |
| The Source | (positive) |
| XXL | (XL) |

Legends Never Die was met with rave reviews from music critics. At Metacritic, which assigns a normalized rating out of 100 to reviews from critics, the album received an average score of 84, which indicates "universal acclaim", based on 4 reviews. David Jeffries of AllMusic gave the album four out of five stars, saying "If he mentioned an exciting mixing of Twista's speed, De La Soul's D.A.I.S.Y. Age attitude, and the modern swagger of the Tech N9ne-driven underground, that would be the headline review of this sophomore release, Legends Never Die, which follows his debut, Die, Rugged Man, Die, by eight-plus years. That's criminal, because when producers like Mr. Green, Apathy, and Buckwild come up with fresh, funky ideas, R.A. responds with excellence, and sometimes a J-Zone-sized sense of humor (check "Luv to Fuck" for Talib Kweli and Redd Foxx's genetics being spliced together, right before your ears)." Khari Nixon of The Source gave the album a positive review, saying "There's something to be said about an individual that is enjoying his 3rd decade as a member of this cutthroat industry, and can still make relevant music rivaling the most prevalent material that's currently out. And for those that don't think Legends Never Die rivals today's prevalent material, simply press play on track 3, the tightly-run lyrical battleship better known as "Definition Of A Rap Flow", and we dare you to imagine a verse out today that can compete with that on just about any level."

David "Rek" Lee of HipHopDX gave the album four out of five stars, saying "Legends Never Die isn't a perfect album. The sequencing is a bit off at times, as it inexplicably jumps from aggressive, lyrical tracks to more subdued conscious records. Also, some of the production feels dated even for an "underground record." But overall, it's an album embedded with enough humor, knowledge, and obscure Hip Hop references ("I'm a whooligan like James Caan's son…") that will force listeners to keep this one in rotation. R.A. the Rugged Man might not care about an industry exec or releasing music on a consistent basis, but his love for the art is undeniable because he's only getting better. The champ is here." Grant Jones of RapReviews gave the album an eight out of ten, saying "Legends Never Die" is noticeably more intense lyrically, with RA adopting his multi-syllable style which shows influences of Big Pun. "Definition of a Rap Flow" is the perfect example of how refined RA is at his art. The only person I can think that may match him for breathless flow is Esoteric, or Pun himself. This relentless verbal assault follows on "Media Midgets" which carries on RA's hatred of the industry, critics and everything else in between. This is a theme which understandably ran through "Die Rugged Man, Die" as it was his ten years-late debut, but having now established himself with regular work and clearly not toning his act down for radio, the anti-industry message seems redundant at times." Sean Ryon of XXL gave the album an XL, saying "With the exception of a few fillers, Legends Never Die is a truly compelling entry in the two-decade discography of R.A. the Rugged Man. It's an album armed with exceptionally mastered production, stunning guest features and raw, emotional delivery from R.A.."

== Commercial performance ==
The album debuted at number 1 on the US Billboard Heatseekers Albums chart, number 17 on the Billboard Top R&B/Hip-Hop Albums chart, and at number 131 on the Billboard 200.

== Track listing ==
| No. | Title | Producer(s) | Length |
|---|---|---|---|
| 1. | "Still Diggin Wit Buck (Legends Intro)" | Buckwild | 1:34 |
| 2. | "The People's Champ" | Apathy | 3:55 |
| 3. | "Definition of a Rap Flow" (featuring Amalie Bruun) | Dev-1, Marc Niles | 3:29 |
| 4. | "Learn Truth" (featuring Talib Kweli) | Mr. Green | 3:16 |
| 5. | "Bang Boogie" | Jussi Jaakola | 1:55 |
| 6. | "Tom Thum" | Will Tell | 3:12 |
| 7. | "Holla-Loo-Yuh" (featuring Tech N9ne and Krizz Kaliko) | C-Lance | 3:12 |
| 8. | "Media Midgets" | Buckwild | 3:43 |
| 9. | "Shoot Me in the Head" | Marco Polo | 3:54 |
| 10. | "Legends Never Die (Daddy's Halo)" | Mr. Green | 3:21 |
| 11. | "The Dangerous Three" (featuring Brother Ali and Masta Ace) | Mr. Green | 3:58 |
| 12. | "Luv to Fuk" (featuring Eamon) | Shuko | 4:19 |
| 13. | "Underground Hitz" (featuring Hopsin) | Will Tell | 2:49 |
| 14. | "Laugh, Clown, Laugh" | Vherbal | 2:55 |
| 15. | "Sam Peckinpah" (featuring Vinnie Paz and Sadat X) | C-Lance | 3:18 |
| 16. | "Outro" | Shuko | 0:32 |
| 17. | "Still Get Through The Day" (featuring Eamon) | Ayatollah | 3:36 |

Bonus Track
| No. | Title | Producer | Length |
|---|---|---|---|
| 18. | "Make You Famous" (featuring Block McCloud) | Vherbal | 4:07 |

Deluxe Edition Bonus Track
| No. | Title | Length |
|---|---|---|
| 19. | "Complex Superiority" (Available via download card as MP3 only.) | 3:27 |

Cassette Edition Bonus Track
| No. | Title | Producer | Length |
|---|---|---|---|
| 20. | "It's Gone" | DJ Noize | 4:10 |

== Charts ==
| Chart (2013) | Peak position |
|---|---|
| UK R&B Albums (OCC) | 36 |
| US Billboard 200 | 131 |
| US Billboard Top R&B/Hip-Hop Albums | 17 |
| US Billboard Top Rap Albums | 12 |
| US Billboard Heatseekers Albums | 1 |
