= Sixteen Tongues =

- Directed by: Scooter McCrae
- Written by: Scooter McCrae
- Produced by: Alex Kuciw
- Starring: Jane Chase; Crawford James; Alice Liu
- Cinematography: Scooter McCrae
- Edited by: Rick O'Shea
- Music by: Cerebellion; Geek Messiah
- Production companies: Seeing Eye Dog Productions; Gem-In-Eye Productions
- Distributed by: Sub Rosa Studios
- Release date: July 2003 (FIFF)
- Running time: 80 minutes
- Country: United States
- Language: English

Sixteen Tongues is a 2003 American science fiction film written and directed by Scooter McCrae. It stars Jane Chase, Crawford James, and Alice Liu.

== Plot ==
In a dystopian future, the lives of three deviants converge: Ginny, a cyborg assassin; Adrian, a rogue cop; and Alik, the assassin's lover. Alik, a hacker, is obsessed with finding her brother's killer, and Ginny wants to kill the scientist who caused her to experience bouts of homicidal rage and crippling sexual overload. The two encounter Adrian in a sleazy hotel where any desire can be sated, no matter how perverse. The only survivor of a massacre, Adrian has received skin grafts from the tongues of his slain comrades. Unknown to the others, the grafts have slowly driven him insane due to psychic trauma.

== Cast ==
- Jane Chase as Ginny Chin-Chin
- Crawford James as Adrian Torque
- Alice Liu as Alik Silens

== Production ==
The title was inspired by the song "Sixteen Tons". As McCrae become more taken with the idea of exploring the possibilities of the title, he developed a plot with characters that were extreme enough that they posed a challenge. The characters were designed in part to make viewers question their sympathy for protagonists, who may not deserve their empathy or sympathy. Filming began in 1999 in Brooklyn and continued through the summer. Casting was made difficult by the transgressive content. McCrae said that he did not ever have to convince the actors, as he made sure that they were comfortable with the requirements of the script. One explicit sex scene was rewritten, as McCrae and Chase agreed that it was too transgressive. Due to a lack of crew members, McCrae himself was forced to take multiple production duties, such as cameras and lighting. Themes include mortality, taboos, the nature of evil, and issues of betrayal and trust. Although the film was not written with a political message in mind, McCrae said that it could not be divorced from its time period, the administration of George W. Bush.

== Release ==
Sixteen Tongues premiered at the Fantasia International Film Festival in July 2003. It was released on DVD on February 22, 2005. Saturn’s Core Audio and Visual released a blu-ray in 2022

== Reception ==
Jon Condit of Dread Central rated it 3/5 stars and wrote, "Sadly, although Mr. McCrae has vision and creativity, the things he lacks in Sixteen Tongues are budget and strong actors. Sometimes his writing is just too heavy for the amateur actors, and it's a shame when a good line isn't handled appropriately." Discussing its pornographic content and transgressive themes, Drew McWeeny of Ain't It Cool News wrote, "If you're looking for something truly transgressive, Sixteen Tongues should test the threshold of even the boldest viewer." Mike Watt of Film Threat rated it 3.5/5 stars and wrote that though the imagery is shocking, the film rewards multiple viewings with a satisfying narrative that is not immediately obvious. Also writing at Film Threat, Eric Campos rated it 3/5 stars and recommended it to fans of cyberpunk films who can handle the disturbing imagery. Bill Gibron of DVD Talk rated it 2.5/5 stars and wrote, "This is an attempt at grandiose filmmaking on a shoestring budget, a movie loaded with intriguing, if often incomplete ideas and imagery, forced into a single claustrophobic cost-cutting setting."
