= Cash on Delivery (album) =

Studio album by Ray Cash
- Released: June 27, 2006
- Recorded: 2005–2006
- Genre: Hip hop
- Length: 61:02
- Label: Ghet-O-Vision; Columbia; Sony Urban
- Producer: Ray Cash; Scarface; Chad "Wes" Hamilton; Knoxxx; Rick Rock; The Kickdrums; Cooly C; JakPot

Singles from Cash on Delivery
- 1. "Sex Appeal (Pimp in My Own Mind)" Released: 2004; 2. "Smokin' & Leanin'" Released: 2005; 3. "Bumpin' My Music" Released: March 21, 2006

Professional ratings
Review scores
Source	Rating
AllMusic	4/5 stars
Winston-Salem Journal	2/4 stars
XXL	XL (4/5)

Cash on Delivery is the debut studio album by American rapper Ray Cash. It was released on June 27, 2006, by Ghet-O-Vision Entertainment, Sony Urban Music, and Columbia Records. Most of the album was finished before he signed a record deal. Guest features that contributed were Scarface among others. Cash on Delivery peaked at number 41 on the Billboard 200 chart and number 8 on the Top R&B/Hip-Hop Albums chart, selling 24,000 copies in the first week. The album received positive reviews from music critics.

== Background ==
In the song "P.A.N.", Cash criticizes bubblegum rap. Also, Cash insinuates that his label Ghet-O-Vision Entertainment and Sony Urban Music before the album's release showed that "it doesn't know what to do with him". The song, "Bumpin' My Music" and album both reflect a hardcore image of hip-hop. On his debut album, he calls out a number of his inspirations in the album.

== Track listing ==
1. "Wake Up Cleveland" - 0:58
2. "The Payback" - 4:01
3. "Bumpin' My Music" (featuring Scarface) - 4:01
4. "Smokin' & Leanin' / Coppin' N Cappin' (Interlude)" (featuring Tucan) - 4:40
5. "Fiends, Fiends, Fiends" - 4:12
6. "Sex Appeal (Pimp in My Own Mind)" - 4:24
7. "She a G / D Boy Anthem (Interlude)" - 5:02
8. "Dope Game" - 3:47
9. "Better Way" (featuring Beanie Sigel) - 4:08
10. "Fuck Amerikkka" - 3:13
11. "Livin' My Life" - 3:27
12. "I'm Gettin'" - 4:18
13. "The Bomb" (featuring Yummy Bingham) - 3:01
14. "Pussy Ass Niggas" (featuring Pastor Troy, Bun B, and T.I.) - 3:53
15. "Take It How You Want It" - 3:22
16. "Here I Stand" - 4:37

== Singles and chart performance ==
Year	Title	U.S. R&B/Hip-Hop
2005	"Sex Appeal (Pimp in My Own Mind)"	—
2005	"Smokin' & Leanin'"	—
2006	"Bumpin' My Music"	56
