= Duckwrth =

American rapper and singer

- Born: Jared Leonardo Lee; May 13, 1989 (age 37); Los Angeles, California, U.S.
- Genres: Hip hop; R&B
- Occupations: Rapper; singer; songwriter; artist; record producer
- Years active: 2012–present

Jared Leonardo Lee (born May 13, 1989), better known by his stage name Duckwrth (pronounced "duckworth" and stylized in all caps), is an American rapper, singer, record producer, songwriter, and artist.

== Early life ==
Lee was born in South Central Los Angeles on May 13, 1989. He grew up in a Christian household, always surrounded by music. Before going into music, Duckwrth studied graphic design in college. He appeared in several TeamBackpack cyphers on the YouTube channel World Emcee.

== Career ==
In the mid-2010s, Lee began releasing his own songs online under the Duckwrth moniker and expanded his audience when he collaborated and released a split project with The Kickdrums in 2015 titled Nowhere. In 2016, Duckwrth released his first full-length album, I'm Uugly. In late 2017, he released a mixtape, An Xtra Uugly Mixtape, being his first record with Republic Records. His single "Start a Riot", featuring Shaboozey, was featured in the 2018 film Spider-Man: Into the Spider-Verse. His song "Michuul" was featured in the HBO series Insecure and the CW series All American. In 2019, he released the EP The Falling Man and released his major label debut album on Republic, SuperGood, in 2020. Following the release of SuperGood, he released his following two EPs, 2021's SG8*, a project with a look at the present time and soundscapes and 2022's Chrome Bull, a more dance-oriented project, under his own imprint, SuperGood Creative Studios. 2025 would see the release of his third full-length album All American F*ckBoy, which would later receive a nomination for Best Immersive Audio Album at the 68th Annual Grammy Awards.

== Discography ==
=== Studio albums ===
List of albums, with release date and label shown
Title	Details
I'm Uugly	Released: September 23, 2016; Label: Them Hellas, The Blind Youth, Empire; Formats: Digital download, streaming, vinyl
SuperGood	Released: August 21, 2020; Label: Republic; Formats: Digital download, streaming, vinyl
All American F*ckBoy	Released: April 2, 2025; Label: Them Hellas, The Blind Youth; Formats: Digital download, streaming, vinyl

=== Mixtapes ===
List of mixtapes, with release date and label shown
Title	Details
Ducktape	Released: August 16, 2012; Label: Self-released; Format: Digital download
Taxfree V.1	Released: February 19, 2014; Label: Self-released; Format: Digital Download
Nowhere (with The Kickdrums)	Released August 21, 2015; Label: Them Hellas; Formats: Digital download, streaming
An Xtra Uugly Mixtape	Released: November 3, 2017; Label: Them Hellas, Republic; Formats: Digital download, streaming, cassette

=== EPs ===
List of extended plays, with release date and label shown
Title	Details
The Falling Man	Released: May 17, 2019; Label: Them Hellas, Republic; Formats: Digital download, streaming
SG8*	Released: September 3, 2021; Label: SuperGood, The Blind Youth; Formats: Digital download, streaming, vinyl
Chrome Bull	Released: October 21, 2022, October 20, 2023 (Deluxe); Label: SuperGood, The Blind Youth; Formats: Digital download, streaming, vinyl

=== Singles ===
==== As lead artist ====
List of singles as lead artist, with year released and album name shown
Title	Year	Album
"Super Soaker" (with the Kickdrums)	2014	Non-album single
"Indica la Roux" (with the Kickdrums, featuring Miloh Smith)	2015	Nowhere
"Naruto" (with the Kickdrums)	2015	Nowhere
"Psycho" (with the Kickdrums)	2015	Nowhere
"Curtis Maypush" (with Ru AREYOU)	2016	Non-album single
"Get Uugly" (featuring Georgia Anne Muldrow)	2016	I'm Uugly
"Rare Panther / Beach House"	2016	I'm Uugly
"I'm Dead" (featuring Sabrina Claudio)	2017	I'm Uugly
"Bernal Heights"	2017	Non-album single
"Michuul."	2017	An Xtra Uugly Mixtape
"Tamagotchi"	2018	An Xtra Uugly Mixtape
"Boy"	2018	An Xtra Uugly Mixtape
"Fall Back"	2018	The Falling Man
"Soprano"	2018	The Falling Man
"Nobody Falls" (featuring Kiana Ledé & Terrace Martin)	2019	The Falling Man
"Crush"	2019	Non-album single
"Find a Way" (featuring Alex Mali, Radio Ahlee, and Bayli)	2020	SuperGood
"Coming Closer" (featuring G.L.A.M. and Julia Romana)	2020	SuperGood
"Quick" (featuring Kian)	2020	SuperGood
"Kiss U Right Now"	2021	SuperGood
"Birthday Suit" (featuring Rayana Jay)	2021	Non-album single
"Make U Go"	2021	SG8*
"4K" (featuring Phabo)	2021	SG8*
"Power Power" (featuring Shaun Ross)	2022	Chrome Bull
"Ce Soir" (featuring Syd)	2022	Chrome Bull
"Beg" (featuring Clay)	2022	Chrome Bull
"Big Bewts" / "Vertigo"	2023	Non-album single
"Grey Scale"	2024	All American F*ckBoy
"Had Enough"	2024	All American F*ckBoy
"Toxic Romantic"	2025	All American F*ckBoy
"Hurricane J.I.M"	2025	All American F*ckBoy
"Wyl' Out"	2025	Non-album singles
"I Wanna Be Your Dog Again"	2026	Non-album singles

==== As featured artist ====
List of singles as featured artist, with year released and album shown
Title	Year	Album
"U.G.L.Y" (Miyavi featuring Duckwrth)	2018	Samurai Sessions, Vol. 3 - World Collide
"Sad and Bored" (Bülow featuring Duckwrth)	2018	Damaged Vol. 2
"Bigbright" (Golden Vessel featuring Elkkle, E^ST and Duckwrth)	2018	Slowshine
"Supposed to Be" (Louis Futon featuring Duckwrth and Baegod)	2019	Way Back When
"Good Girls" (August 08 featuring Duckwrth)	2019	Happy Endings with an Asterisk
"Love Me Like" (Rayana Jay featuring Duckwrth)	2019	Love Me Like
"Play Too Much" (Kyle Dion featuring UMI & Duckwrth)	2020	Suga (Deluxe Edition)
"Work" (Nez featuring Duckwrth and Saint Bodhi)	2020	Non-album singles
"High Hopes" (Pulko featuring sad alex and Duckwrth)	2021	Non-album singles
"Specific" (TeaMarr featuring Duckwrth)	2021	Non-album singles
"Fav Flav" (Dua Saleh featuring Duckwrth)	2021	Crossover
"Favorite" (Ru AREYOU featuring Duckwrth)	2022	Non-album singles
"Pieces" (Arlissa featuring Duckwrth)	2022	Non-album singles
"All Around The World" (Snakehips with Duckwrth)	2022	Never Worry
"Can't Fake What You Feel" (Jordan Hawkins featuring Duckwrth)	2023	Do It To Me
"Say Less" (Max featuring Duckwrth)	2024	Love in Stereo

=== Other appearances ===
- "Start a Riot", with Shaboozey, on the Spider-Man: Into the Spider-Verse soundtrack, 2018.
- "Unstatus Quo", done for a 2019 promotional video for Palms Casino Resort, also released as a single.
- "Giants" (in collaboration with Riot Games, as part of the group True Damage, featuring Duckwrth, Keke Palmer, Soyeon of (G)I-dle, Becky G, and Thutmose, 2019)
- "Read Your Mind", Tayla Parx featuring Duckwrth on We Need to Talk, 2019.
- "Get Together", Louis the Child featuring Duckwrth on Here for Now, 2020.
- "Wildlings", Tobe Nwigwe featuring EARTHGANG and Duckwrth on Cincoriginals, 2020.
- "Settle the Score", with Cordae on the Space Jam: A New Legacy soundtrack, 2021.
- "Drip", Kyle Dion featuring Duckwrth on Sassy, 2021.
- "Found But Dilla", Portraits of Tracy featuring Duckwrth on Driving Home: Parting Gifts, 2024.
- "Clocks", a cover of the Coldplay song done for the Grammy ReImagined series, 2024.
- Til' My Fingers Bleed, with Dino & The Word Alive, the official anthem for the 2025 Esports World Cup.
