= Shatter Dead =

- Directed by: Scooter McCrae
- Written by: Scooter McCrae
- Produced by: Scooter McCrae
- Starring: Stark Raven; Flora Fauna; Daniel 'Smalls' Johnson; Robert Wells
- Cinematography: Matthew M. Howe
- Music by: Geek Messiah; Steven Rajkumar
- Distributed by: Tempe Video
- Release date: 1994
- Running time: 84 minutes
- Country: United States
- Language: English

Shatter Dead is a 1994 independent zombie film directed by Scooter McCrae. Its plot concerns a dystopian world where the dead no longer stay dead, but remain cognizant of the world around them; amidst this world, a woman named Susan attempts to return home to her boyfriend.

== Plot ==
In the first scene, a female Angel of Death is seen having sex with a mortal woman, seemingly impregnating her. This causes humans to stop dying, and those who were already dead return to life as disenfranchised vagabonds.

17 months later, a woman named Susan is working her way through a mostly abandoned town on foot, after having bought food; she has armed herself heavily to fend off the undead. While walking through the downtown area, she encounters several undead people begging for money, begrudgingly giving some to a heavily disfigured man. Though the undead seem somewhat bewildered and eager to please, she catches one trying to siphon gasoline from her car; she chases him down and shoots his gas canister, setting him on fire. Susan then returns to her car and leaves town. When her car eventually runs out of gas on a country road, she suddenly finds herself surrounded by a religious cult of zombies led by a preacher, who claims her car "for the service of the Lord," refills the gas tank, and drives off in it.

After traveling on foot for a while and stealing another undead person's car, Susan arrives in a new town. She encounters some living people who direct her to a safe house to stay the night. While staying there, she encounters Mary, a dead woman pretending to be alive; they end up showering together, and Susan starts to trust Mary after she opens up about her own death, saying that she committed suicide to be young and beautiful forever. That night, the house is attacked by militant, religiously fanatical zombies who murder every living person in the house, including the pregnant landlady, who enters the bathroom and nurses her dead fetus in the shower afterwards. In the chaos, Susan accidentally shoots Mary in the head.

Susan flees the house and encounters the preacher who stole her car. She threatens him while he tries to convince her that death is better than life, opining that the "old generation" of humanity is coming to an end. Susan uses a pocket mirror to check him for signs of breathing; discovering he is alive, she shoots him in the head and takes her car back. Eventually, she returns home to Dan, her boyfriend, but discovers that he had previously killed himself by slashing his wrists in the bathtub. He pours her a glass of milk, but covertly slips poison into it before she drinks it; they then have sex by using Susan's pistol as a strap-on, as he is unable to achieve an erection himself due to being dead. Afterwards, Dan reveals the poisoning to her, reasoning that she will be young and beautiful forever once she dies. She threatens to shoot herself to sully her beauty and tries to vomit the poison out, but he prevents her from doing so. However, she manages to shoot him in the head and send him falling out the apartment window before dying.

The now-undead preacher happens across Dan, having broken many bones and suffered heavy disfiguration from the fall, and fashions wooden splints to allow him to walk again. Meanwhile, Susan wakes up and enters the bathroom, realizing she is now dead. She takes water from a dripping faucet and puts it into her lifeless eyes. Dan is then heard outside the apartment begging to be let in, as the film abruptly ends.

== Production ==
Director McCrae and cinematographer Howe were inspired to make their own film after watching low-budget exploitation films and thinking that they could make a better one themselves. After experiencing difficulty in explaining his scripts, McCrae decided to shoot an example of the tone and style that he was attempting to convey; that project became Shatter Dead. Shooting took a total of ten days over a two-month period on weekends.

== Critical reception ==
Joe Bob Briggs gave the film a positive review and called it "a Night of the Living Dead for the '90s". Bloody Disgusting rated it 2/5 stars and wrote, "In all fairness, this is hardcore, uncompromising filmmaking. At the same time, Mr. McCrae should perhaps flesh out his ideas a bit more before putting them to film." G. Noel Gross of DVD Talk called the film "an esoteric zombie odyssey that plods along like a Euro-horror epic punctuated by violent ejaculations of carnage." Writing in The Zombie Movie Encyclopedia, academic Peter Dendle said, "Though the premise is fresh and there is a plentiful supply of good raw ideas, the movie is built around character interaction among amateur actors, leaving it scattered and directionless. It lacks sustained tension and resolution, and directs too much energy away from its fascinating conceptual possibilities in favor of trite exploitation concerns". John Patterson, in an analysis of the film for Dread Central, identifies queer themes in the film. In Patterson's analysis, the zombies represent a challenge to the social order, including heteronormative concepts of sex and gender, and Susan lashes out at them so violently because she fears this change.

The film attracted renewed critical attention with the 2022 Blu-ray release from Saturn's Core. Horror Society gave the film 3.5 out of 5 and the overall release 4 out of 5, praising its creativity and unconventional story while acknowledging the limitations of its production. Brian Orndorf, reviewing the same release, was less favorable, arguing that McCrae's abstract imagery and European art-film influences overwhelmed a promising premise and criticizing the film's pacing and narrative clarity. In 2023, Andrew Kotwicki of The Movie Sleuth described Shatter Dead as an unusually disturbing and transgressive SOV zombie film, praising its visual composition, mournful electronic score and unconventional conception of the undead. Kotwicki argued that its combination of extreme imagery and philosophical ideas distinguished it from more conventional zombie movies, while acknowledging the amateur cast and its difficult, uncompromising narrative nature. Moria Reviews gave the film four out of five stars and described it as "unique and entirely original", emphasizing that it is not a conventional zombie film. The review praised the film's unusual depiction of the resurrected dead and its social ideas, while acknowledging flat performances, occasionally unconvincing effects and its episodic structure.

== Awards ==
- Best independent film award at the 1995 Fantafestival.
