= From Babylon to Timbuk2 =

Studio album by Timbo King
- Released: August 30, 2011
- Genre: Hip-hop
- Length: 55:33
- Label: Nature Sounds
- Producers: Akir; BP; Bronze Nazareth; Dev 1; Lil' Fame; Vinny Idol

Timbo King chronology
From Babylon to Timbuk2 (2011)	Wu Camp (2018)

Professional ratings
Review scores
Source	Rating
RapReviews	7.5/10

From Babylon to Timbuk2 is the debut solo full-length studio album by American rapper and Wu-Tang affiliate Timbo King. It was released on August 30, 2011 via Nature Sounds. Production was handled by Bronze Nazareth, BP, Dev One, Akir, Lil' Fame and Vinny Idol. It features guest appearances from Akir, Beazy, Hell Razah, Junior Reid, Keesha Mishawn, Killah Priest, R.A. the Rugged Man, RZA, Vision N.D.N.S. and William "Booth" Cooper. Accompanying music videos were shot for the songs "From Babylon to Timbuk2" (directed by Masar), "High Ranking" (directed by Ethan Blum, R.A. the Rugged Man and Jed I. Rosenberg), "The Autobiography of Timothy Drayton", "Bar Exam" (both directed by Hickory Lawson), and "Book Value".

The album was inspired by the 1969 Black Hebrews history book From Babylon to Timbuktu written by Rudolph R. Windsor.

== Track listing ==
No.	Title	Writer(s)	Producer(s)	Length
1.	"The Book of Timothy" (Intro)	Timothy Drayton; Justin Cross	Bronze Nazareth	2:38
2.	"Wardance" (featuring RZA)	Drayton; Robert Diggs; Randy Ousley	Vinny Idol	3:38
3.	"Bar Exam"	Drayton; Brad Perlow	BP	2:52
4.	"From Babylon to Timbuktu" (featuring William Cooper)	Drayton; Andrew Kissle; Perlow	BP	2:48
5.	"The Two Babylonians" (Interlude #1)	Cross	Bronze Nazareth	1:02
6.	"High Ranking" (featuring R.A. the Rugged Man)	Drayton; R.A. Thorburn; Cross	Bronze Nazareth	3:30
7.	"Show Us the Way"	Drayton; Devin Horwitz	Dev-1	3:08
8.	"Outside Intelligence" (featuring Killah Priest and Beazy)	Drayton; Walter Reed; Baron Hilman; Perlow	BP	3:41
9.	"Identity Crisis" (Interlude #2)	Cross	Bronze Nazareth	1:21
10.	"Youth"	Drayton; Cross	Bronze Nazareth	3:57
11.	"The Autobiography of Timothy Drayton"	Drayton; Jamal Grinnage	Lil' Fame	3:39
12.	"The Rebellion" (featuring Hell Razah and Jr. Reid)	Drayton; Chron Smith; Delroy Reid; Horwitz	Dev-1	3:07
13.	"Tombstone"	Drayton; Cross	Bronze Nazareth	3:36
14.	"Book Value"	Drayton; Horwitz	Dev-1	3:06
15.	"Brain Food" (featuring Vision N.D.N.S., Akir and Keesha Mishawn)	Drayton; Matthew Chambers; Stephen Woods; Keesha White	Akir	4:29
16.	"Timbuktu" (Interlude #3)	Drayton; Cross	Bronze Nazareth	1:27
17.	"Thinking Cap"	Drayton; Cross	Bronze Nazareth	3:14
18.	"Ruling Class"	Drayton; Perlow	BP	4:20
Total length:				55:33
