= Bumpin' My Music =

Single by Ray Cash featuring Scarface

from the album Cash on Delivery
- Released: March 21, 2006
- Recorded: 2005
- Genre: Hip hop
- Length: 4:01
- Label: Sony Urban Music/Columbia
- Producer(s): Rick Rock

Ray Cash featuring Scarface singles chronology
"Smokin & Leanin"	"Bumpin' My Music"	"She A G"

"Bumpin' My Music" is a 2006 single by Ray Cash as his third single from Cash on Delivery. This song is Cash's first single to reach any chart in Billboard magazine or to be featured on a countdown.. The track is the third song on the album with a running time of 4:01. Scarface, who is an idol of Ray Cash is featured on the song.

== Background ==
The song was released in 2006 and received airplay in the spring. The song is about the Cleveland style of music. It has a distinctive beat, which is played loudly on the chorus parts of the song, but keeps the same pitch for the majority of the song.

The video begins with Cash waking up in bed, with a bunch of his friends who supposedly he has had a house party with. He brushes his teeth and then he is seen on the streets of Cleveland and mentions the Ghet-to-Vision label. He then rides down Cleveland. There is a woman who stares at him from her house. He mentions UGK, and a glimpse of one of their albums is shown. The woman later rides in his car.

In the next scene, he carries his boombox, as shots of Cleveland and cars are shown. Several children follow Cash on bikes. Cash has his car door open. At this point, he stops at a car wash and is recognized by another patron (played by Devin The Dude).

The next scenes feature shots of C.O.D. Cash on Delivery; his associates carry boxes of his CDs into a local goods store. The camera in the video shows different angles of Cash and his friends.

As the video shows Ray Cash as in Cash on a dollar, Scarface's verse begins, as Cash calls him on his cell phone. In a huddle, the clique come down the streets and apparently walk into a party. The video shows clips of Cash and Scarface alone in black, with the boombox. Some of their separate scenes include both with boomboxes, and with women. Scarface raps out the party scene, which occasionally is shown in sideview of Scarface and Cash alone. Cash and his friend play craps. UGK & Layzie Bone make a cameo appearance in the video.

The end of the video shows various clips of Cleveland, Cash in concert, and Cash and Scarface alone.

== Remixes ==
"Bumpin' My Music" has received remixes which are available on the internet. Cash mentions Pimp C who is in one of the remixes, to show the relation.

- "Bumpin' My Music" (Official Remix) (Ray Cash feat. Pimp C, and Project Pat, and T.I.)
- "Bumpin' My Music" (Remix II) (Ray Cash feat. Rayne Storm, Pimp C, and Project Pat, and T.I.)
- "Bumpin' My Music" (Remix) (Ray Cash feat. Scarface and Jay-Z)
- "Bumpin' My Music" (Freestyle) (Sheek Louch feat. Bully and J-Hood)

== Success ==
The single reached number 56 on the Billboard Hot R&B/Hip-Hop Songs chart. It was number four on the Top 30 in April 2006.
