= Heavy Metal Kings (song) =

Single by Jedi Mind Tricks featuring Ill Bill

Single by Jedi Mind Tricks featuring Ill Bill

from the album Servants in Heaven, Kings in Hell
- Released: August 1, 2006
- Recorded: 2006
- Studio: Found Sound Studios (Philadelphia, PA); Powerhouse Studios (New York, NY)
- Genre: Hip hop
- Length: 4:35
- Label: Babygrande
- Songwriter(s): Vincenzo Luviner; William Braunstein; Kevin Baldwin
- Producer(s): Stoupe the Enemy of Mankind

Jedi Mind Tricks singles chronology
"The Age of Sacred Terror" (2005)	"Heavy Metal Kings" (2006)	"Second Hand Smoke" (2021)

Ill Bill singles chronology
"God Is An Atheist" (2004)	"Heavy Metal Kings" (2006)	"I'm A Goon / Society Is Brainwashed" (2008)

Music video
- "Heavy Metal Kings" on YouTube

"Heavy Metal Kings" is a song by American underground hip hop duo Jedi Mind Tricks featuring a guest verse from fellow New York-based rapper Ill Bill. It was released in 2006 through Babygrande Records as the lead single from the group's fifth studio album Servants in Heaven, Kings in Hell.

Main recording sessions took place in 2006 at Found Sound Recording in Philadelphia by Scott "Supe" Stallone, while Ill Bill's vocals were recorded at Powerhouse Studios in New York by Elliot Thomas. Written by Vinnie Paz, Ill Bill and Stoupe the Enemy of Mankind, it was produced by the latter. The song utilises a sample from "Boiling Rage (Estuans Interius)" by German composer Carl Orff, taken from his famous cantata Carmina Burana, and a vocal sample from Mobb Deep's "Front Lines (Hell on Earth)" for the chorus.

The single was released in a limited edition blue vinyl pressing, with every copy signed by group's lead vocalist Vinnie Paz. The music video was released shortly before the album's release, starring Vinnie Paz, Ill Bill, DJ Kwestion and R.A. the Rugged Man.

This title of the song inspired Vinnie Paz and Ill Bill to release an eponymous collaborative album, which was dropped in 2011. In 2017, the duo of Paz and Bill released their second collaborative album, Black God White Devil, under the 'Heavy Metal Kings' moniker.

== Track listing ==
No.	Title	Length
1.	"Heavy Metal Kings (Dirty)" (featuring Ill Bill)	3:53
2.	"Heavy Metal Kings (Clean)" (featuring Ill Bill)	4:19
3.	"Heavy Metal Kings (Instrumental)"	3:53
4.	"Heavy Metal Kings (Acapella)" (featuring Ill Bill)	4:07

== Personnel ==
- Vincenzo "Vinnie Paz" Luvineri — songwriter, first and third verses, chorus
- William "Ill Bill" Braunstein — songwriter, second verse
- Kevin "Stoupe the Enemy of Mankind" Baldwin — songwriter, producer
- Dave "DJ Kwestion" Klein — scratches
- Scott "Supe" Stallone — recording, mixing
- Elliot Thomas — additional vocal recording
- Michael Sarsfield — mastering
