= Scooter McCrae =

American director

- Born: Middletown, New York, U.S.
- Occupations: Film director, film editor
- Years active: 1994–present
- Known for: No-budget films
- Notable work: Shatter Dead, Sixteen Tongues

Scooter McCrae is an American director known for Shatter Dead and Sixteen Tongues.

== Early life ==
McCrae was born in Brooklyn, New York and spent most of his formative years in Middletown, New York. As a kid, he made Super 8 films and was a fan of science fiction. He attended SUNY Purchase after being turned down for NYU, which he said was fortuitous. With the money saved from his tuition at a state college, he was able to finance his early films.

== Career ==
McCrae says that he enjoys working with low-budget films, as the particularities of the subject matters in which he is interested are more suitable for those kinds of films. His first work was with Frank Henenlotter, whom he cited as a mentor. McCrae worked as a production assistant on Frankenhooker and Basket Case 2. McCrae's directorial debut was Shatter Dead, a zombie film. He was inspired to make his own film after watching low-budget films with his friends, after which he thought to himself that he could make a better film than the ones he was renting from the video store. The film received a positive review by Joe Bob Briggs. His second feature was Sixteen Tongues, a film that writer Mike Watt described as "Blade Runner meets Salo". Watt wrote that a major studio would never make the film, as it explores themes that are totally alien outside of independent filmmaking. He later worked again with Henenlotter as an editor on Bad Biology.

== Filmography ==
=== Director ===
- Shatter Dead (1994)
- Sixteen Tongues (1999)
- Saint Frankenstein (2015)
- Black Eyed Susan (2024)

=== Editor ===
- Bad Biology (2008)
