= Night of the Bloody Apes (album) =

Album by R.A. the Rugged Man

Studio album by Crustified Dibbs
- Released: 1994
- Recorded: 1992–1993
- Genre: East Coast hip hop
- Length: 53:23
- Label: Jive/BMG Records
- Producers: Marc "Nigga" Nilez, Erick Sermon, Buckwild, R.A. the Rugged Man, Trackmasters

Crustified Dibbs chronology
Night of the Bloody Apes (1994)	Die, Rugged Man, Die (2004)

Singles from Night of the Bloody Apes
- 1. "Bloody Axe" Released: 1993; 2. "Bloodshed Hua Hoo" Released: August 15, 1994

Night of the Bloody Apes is the debut, unreleased album by R.A. the Rugged Man. After it was shelved by Jive, he would later unofficially release it under the moniker Crustified Dibbs. The album significantly helped establish R.A. the Rugged Man's musical career. It also features a guest appearance from Biggie Smalls.

== Track listing ==
No.	Title	Length
1.	"Toolbox Murderer"	3:47
2.	"You Ain't Never Been Down"	3:23
3.	"Walking Down The Street With My Nuts In My Hand"	4:48
4.	"Every Record Label Sucks Dick"	3:44
5.	"R. A. Meets A. R." (Skit)	0:36
6.	"Hookin' With The Hookers" (featuring Glenn Gibbs and Capital T)	5:08
7.	"Bloody Axe"	4:18
8.	"R.A. Classroom" (Skit)	0:55
9.	"R.A. Be Down" (Aww Baby Now)	4:12
10.	"Cunt Renaissance" (featuring Biggie Smalls)	2:35
11.	"Back To The Rubber-Room"	3:57
12.	"Bloodshed Hua Hoo"	3:40
13.	"Interlude"	0:40
14.	"Statchy"	3:54
15.	"Bloody Body Parts in Da Fruit Punch Bowl"	4:10
16.	"Bloodshed Hua Hoo" (Nigga Niles Crusty Remix)	3:35
Total length:		53:31

== Samples ==
Toolbox Murderer

- "Let a Woman Be a Woman - Let a Man Be a Man" by Dyke & the Blazers

Every Record Label Sucks Dick

- "Capricorn" by The Cannonball Adderley Quintet
- "School Boy Crush" by Average White Band

Bloody Axe

- "Papa Was Too" by Joe Tex
- "Ain't No Half-Steppin'" by Big Daddy Kane

R.A. Be Down (Aww Baby Now)

- "Goodbye Love" by Guy

Back To The Rubber-Room

- "It's a New Day" by Skull Snaps
- "FX & Scratches (Vol. 5)" by Simon Harris
- "The Assembly Line" by Commodores

Bloodshed Hua Hoo

- "Nobody Knows De Trouble I've Seen" by Harry T. Burleigh
- "Get Out of My Life, Woman" by Lee Dorsey
- "Think (About It)" by Lyn Collins

Bloody Body Parts in Da Fruit Punch Bowl

- "Funky President (People It's Bad)" by James Brown

Bloodshed (Nigga Niles Crusty Remix)

- "Funky Drummer" by James Brown
