= All My Heroes Are Dead =

Studio album by R.A. the Rugged Man
- Released: April 17, 2020
- Recorded: 2017–2020
- Studio: No Mystery Studio, New York City
- Genre: Hip-hop
- Length: 75:51
- Label: Nature Sounds
- Producer: Prince Paul, DJ Jazzy Jeff, Psycho Les, Mr. Green, Classified, Teddy Roxspin, C-Lance, Shroom, The Jokerr

R.A. the Rugged Man chronology
Legends Never Die (2013)	All My Heroes Are Dead (2020)

Singles from All My Heroes Are Dead
- 1. "Legendary Loser" Released: January 15, 2020; 2. "Wondering (How to Believe)" Released: March 11, 2020; 3. "Golden Oldies" Released: March 23, 2020; 4. "The Slayers Club" Released: April 19, 2020; 5. "Dragon Fire" Released: March 15, 2022

All My Heroes Are Dead is the third studio album from New York City hip-hop artist R.A. the Rugged Man. The album was released on April 17, 2020, by Nature Sounds. It is the follow-up to 2013's Legends Never Die. The album features guest appearances from Ghostface Killah, Inspectah Deck, Masta Killa, Kool G Rap, Ice-T, Chuck D, Timbo King, Atmosphere, Vinnie Paz, Eamon, Onyx, M.O.P., Brand Nubian, and A-F-R-O. The album's production was handled by Prince Paul, Psycho Les, Mr. Green, The Kickdrums and Classified, among others.

== Background ==
Following the success of Legends Never Die, R.A. the Rugged Man announced he would begin working on a follow-up project. The first single from the album, "Legendary Loser", produced by Psycho Les of The Beatnuts, was released on January 15, 2020, alongside visuals and confirmation of the project title. On April 13, 2020, an official trailer was released for the album. The visual promotion, produced by Thorburn, was created as an homage to various B movie action films of the 1980s.

== Reception ==
HipHop Golden Age called All My Heroes Are Dead the best album of the year so far, and called "Slayer Club" off the album the best posse cut of the year. HipHop Dx called All My Heroes Are Dead one of the best albums of 2020.

== Track listing ==
All My Heroes Are Dead track listing
No.	Title	Producer(s)	Length
1.	"All My Heroes Are Dead (The Introduction)"	Breakbeat Lou, Super Brown Bum, Vecz, The Kickdrums, Falling Down	2:33
2.	"Legendary Loser"	Psycho Les	4:21
3.	"Golden Oldies" (featuring Atmosphere and Eamon)	The Kickdrums	3:32
4.	"Wondering (How to Believe)" (featuring David Myles)	Classified	4:01
5.	"Dragon Fire" (featuring Ghostface Killah, Kool G Rap, Masta Killa and XX3EME)	Shroom	4:36
6.	"All Systems Go"	Michal Menert	3:22
7.	"Cancelled Skit" (Performed by Psalm One and Angel Davanport)		0:23
8.	"Angelic Boy"	The Kickdrums, Chris Conway	4:15
9.	"Gotta Be Dope" (featuring A-F-R-O and DJ Jazzy Jeff)	C-Lance, MTK	3:22
10.	"First Born" (featuring Novel)	Mr. Green, The Jokerr	4:32
11.	"E.K.N.Y. (Ed Koch New York)" (featuring Inspectah Deck and Timbo King)	Mr. Green, Radim "Radimo" Vychopen, Anthony "Capital" Marotta	3:18
12.	"Hate Speech"	Teddy Roxpin	4:18
13.	"Living Through a Screen (Everything Is a Lie)" (featuring The Kickdrums)	Hughes Payen, Shroom	3:46
14.	"Contra-Dictionary"	Mr. Green	3:25
15.	"The Slayers Club" (featuring Ice-T, Vinnie Paz, Brand Nubian, Chris Rivers, Chino XL, M.O.P. and Onyx)	The Kickdrums, Cenk Coker, C-Lance	4:26
16.	"Life of the Party" (featuring Eamon)	Prince Paul	4:21
17.	"The Big Snatch"	Mr. Green	4:06
18.	"John John Skit"		0:12
19.	"Who Do We Trust?" (featuring Immortal Technique)	Tone Spliff	3:55
20.	"Malice of Mammon" (featuring Chuck D of Public Enemy)	Mr. Green	3:52
21.	"Sean riP (Interlude)" (featuring Shaun P)	Carnage The Executioner	0:41
22.	"The After Life" (featuring Sarah Smith and Kelly Waters)	The Jokerr, Anthony "Capital" Marotta, Mr. Fingaz	4:47
Total length:			75:51

== Chart performance ==
The album debuted at number 7 on the US Billboard Heatseekers Albums, reached number 22 on the Billboard Top Current Album Sales chart and peaked at number 9 on the Billboard Top Canadian Album Sales chart. The album debuted at number 3 on the UK R&B chart.

== Charts ==
Chart (2020)	Peak position
CA Billboard Top Canadian Album Sales	9
Swiss Albums (Schweizer Hitparade)	17
UK R&B Albums (OCC)	3
US Billboard Top Current Album Sales	22
US Billboard Heatseekers Albums	7
