= Ray Cash =

American rapper

- Born: Wardell Raymond Cheeks; January 14, 1980 (age 46)
- Origin: Cleveland, Ohio, U.S.
- Genres: Hip hop; hardcore hip hop; Midwest hip hop
- Occupations: Rapper; songwriter
- Years active: 2005–present
- Labels: Ghet-O-Vision; Sony Urban; Columbia; M. Stacks Music LLC
- Website: http://www.raycash.com

Wardell Raymond Cheeks (born January 14, 1980), better known by his stage name Ray Cash, is an American rapper from Cleveland, Ohio.

== Early life and education ==
Cheeks grew up in Cleveland. While in high school, he performed freestyle raps with his friends providing beats by banging on lunchroom tables. After Cheeks saw Jay-Z in concert during the Hard Knock Life tour, he decided to become a professional.

== Career ==
=== First album ===
As Ray Cash, Cheeks released singles "Sex Appeal (Pimp in My own mind)" and "Smokin' and Leanin'" in 2005; those songs were played on local radio. In 2006, the hit single "Sex Appeal" was featured on music video platforms like; MTV Jams, BET 106 and Park, as well as a write up in the XXL magazine. For his debut album Cash on Delivery, he went on tour with Mobb Deep from May 3 to May 31. Cash released Cash on Delivery under Sony Urban Music/Columbia on June 27, 2006. This album reached #41 on the Billboard 200. XXL praised the album. The second major single released from Ray Cash, featured the legendary hip hop artist, Scarface (rapper) entitled "Bumpin` my Music". In 2006, this single peaked on the Billboard charts reaching #56.

=== Second album ===
After the minor success of "C.O.D." Cash went right to work on his second album "Rosé Ray", which was released under M. Stacks Music on September 30, 2009. It features the street single "Certified" which features fellow Clevelander, Darren Anthony, and Curren$y (formerly of Young Money/Cash Money). The album was entirely produced by M. Stacks. The album also features "Darren Anthony" on a track titled "Let me". Recently, he last released a track called "Bitch I'm Wrong."

== Discography ==
=== Albums ===
Year	Title	Peak chart positions		
Year	Title	U.S.	U.S. R&B	U.S. Rap
2006	Cash on Delivery: Released: June 27, 2006; Label: Ghet-O-Vision/Sony Urban/Columbia	41	8	6
2009	Rosé Ray: Released: September 30, 2009; Label: M. Stacks Music LLC/Rec Reel	N/A	N/A	N/A
2011	'Champagne Talk': Released: May 18, 2011; Label: CHAMPAGNE MUZIC GROUP/Rec Reel	N/A	N/A	N/A
2011	'Don King': Released: December 31, 2011; Label: CHAMPAGNE MUZIC GROUP/Rec Reel	N/A	N/A	N/A

=== Singles ===
Year	Title	Peak chart positions	Album
Year	Title	U.S. R&B	Album
2005	"Smokin' & Leanin'"	-	Cash on Delivery
2005	"Sex Appeal"	-	Cash on Delivery
2006	"Bumpin' My Music" (feat. Scarface)	56	Cash on Delivery

=== As a featured performer ===
Year	Title	Peak chart positions	Album
Year	Title	U.S. R&B	Album
2009	"M.O.B." (Da kennel feat. Ray Cash) "	-	-

=== Music videos ===
Year	Title	Director
2006	"Bumpin' My Music"	Jonathan Mannion
