= Servants in Heaven, Kings in Hell =

Studio album by Jedi Mind Tricks
- Released: September 19, 2006
- Recorded: 2005–2006
- Genre: Underground hip-hop
- Label: Babygrande
- Producer: Stoupe the Enemy of Mankind

Jedi Mind Tricks chronology
Legacy of Blood (2004)	Servants in Heaven, Kings in Hell (2006)	A History of Violence (2008)

Singles from Servants in Heaven, Kings in Hell
- 1. "Heavy Metal Kings" Released: August 1, 2006

Professional ratings
Review scores
Source	Rating
AllHipHop	4/5 stars
AllMusic	4/5 stars
Hip-Hop Linguistics	5/5 stars
HipHopDX	3.5/5 stars
HipHopSite.com	(4/5)
MVRemix	(8/10)
Prefix Magazine	(7/10)
RapReviews	(8.5/10)

Servants in Heaven, Kings in Hell is the fifth studio album by hip-hop group Jedi Mind Tricks. It was released September 19, 2006 through Babygrande Records. The first single, "Heavy Metal Kings", featuring Ill Bill of La Coka Nostra, was released in early August through iTunes and a limited edition vinyl pressing. Additional guest appearances on the album are provided by Shara Worden of My Brightest Diamond, Sean Price, R.A. the Rugged Man, Block McCloud and Army of the Pharaohs members Chief Kamachi and Reef the Lost Cauze.

== Overview ==
As with previous Jedi Mind Tricks albums, many of the track titles appear to be lifted from previous songs by heavy metal groups. For example, "When All Light Dies" was previously the title of a song by Trivium; "Serenity in Murder" is also the name of a Slayer track; "Razorblade Salvation" is also a song by Sinergy; and "Black Winter Day" is the name of a track by Amorphis. The album title, as well, could potentially be a reference to the Kreator track "Servant in Heaven (King in Hell)" from their Violent Revolution album. Much of the lyrics reference heavy metal also, i.e. "I'm a Cannibal Corpse" (When All Light Dies) and "Calculate infinity with The Dillinger Escape Plan." (Serenity In Murder).

Servants in Heaven became the group's most commercially successful release, being their first album to break into the Billboard 200, and also landed in the top ten on the Independent Albums chart, and the top fifty on the Top R&B/Hip Hop Albums chart. The album was warmly received critically, especially when compared to their two previous efforts, Visions of Gandhi and Legacy of Blood, which both received mixed reviews. AllMusic gave the album a positive four star rating; writer Marisa Brown stated:

Like how Wu-Tang appealed to so many different fans because of both their hard, urban beats and their smart, complex lyrics, so too are Jedi Mind Tricks able to achieve that same status. Stoupe's production is heavy yet musical, and Paz's rhymes are intelligent yet accessible, his voice rough yet his delivery smooth. Servants in Heaven, Kings in Hell is the collaboration of two talented musicians who can create a nearly flawless album in which each track can stand on its own, but is more powerful as a whole, as an exploration of pain and hatred, of those feelings that we often don't wish to address but that, thanks to Jedi Mind Tricks, will be addressed for us.

An exclusive version of the album was released at Trans World Entertainment chain stores. This version features three bonus tracks, a remixed version of "Heavy Metal Kings", performed with California hardcore band Terror, the D-Tension mixtape track "Pretty Little Whores", featuring OuterSpace, and "Blitz Inc.", featuring King Syze and Esoteric, as well as a bonus DVD, featuring the "Heavy Metal Kings" music video.

== Track listing ==
#	Title	Guests
1	"Intro"	
2	"Put 'Em In The Grave"	
3	"Suicide"	
4	"Uncommon Valor: A Vietnam Story"	R.A. the Rugged Man
5	"A Blood Red Path"	
6	"When All Light Dies"	Shara Worden
7	"Serenity In Murder"	
8	"Pariah Demise (Interlude)"	
9	"Heavy Metal Kings"	Ill Bill
10	"Shadow Business"	
11	"Triumph & Agony (Interlude)"	
12	"Razorblade Salvation"	Shara Worden
13	"Outlive The War"	Sean Price & Block McCloud
14	"Gutta Music"	Reef the Lost Cauze & Chief Kamachi
15	"Temples of Ice (Interlude)"	
16	"Black Winter Day"	
17	"Heavy Metal Kings (Terror Remix)" (produced by Scott Stallone)^{*}	Ill Bill & Terror
18	"Pretty Little Whores" (produced by D-Tension)^{*}	OuterSpace
19	"Blitz Inc." (produced by 7L)^{*}	King Syze & MC Esoteric

^{*} = Bonus tracks

== Samples ==
Put 'Em In The Grave

- "Threat" by Jay-Z
- "Twinz (Deep Cover '98)" by Big Pun
- "Quiet Storm" by Mobb Deep

Suicide

- "1-800 Suicide" by Gravediggaz

Serenity In Murder

- "Made You Look (Remix)" by Nas (Vocals by Jadakiss)
- "Still D.R.E." by Dr. Dre
- "Day One" by D.I.T.C. (Vocals by Lord Finesse)
- "Quiet Storm" by Mobb Deep (Vocals by Prodigy)

Heavy Metal Kings

- "Estuans Interius" by Carl Orff
- samples "Hell on Earth (Front Lines)" by Mobb Deep

Shadow Business

- "Il Mio Coraggio" by Ornella Vanoni

Razorblade Salvation

- "Dumb I Sound" by Sufjan Stevens

Outlive the War

- "Noi Siamo Zingarelle" by Giuseppe Verdi

Gutta Music

- "Yo No Soy Esa"by Mari Trini

Black Winter Day

- "Tear Me Apart" by Alberto Daglio

== Credits ==
- Vinnie Paz - Lead vocals
- Stoupe the Enemy of Mankind - Producer
- R.A. the Rugged Man - Vocals
- Shara Worden - Vocals
- Ill Bill - Vocals
- Sean Price - Vocals
- Block McCloud - Vocals
- Reef the Lost Cauze - Vocals
- Chief Kamachi - Vocals
- Terror - Vocals
- OuterSpace - Vocals
- King Syze - Vocals
- Esoteric - Vocals
- Crypt the Warchild - Additional vocals
- Liz Fullerton - Additional vocals
- Scott "Supe" Stallone - Production, mixing, engineering, bass, keyboards
- D-Tension - Production
- 7L - Production
- Damian Cusamano - Bass
- DJ Kwestion - Cuts
- Michael Sarsfield - Mastering
- Chuck Wilson - Executive producer
- Yan - A&R
- Jesse Stone - Additional A&R, marketing
- Jill Shehebar - International marketing
- Michael Schiller - DVD creative
- Paul A. Romano - Art direction, artwork, design

== Singles ==
Single information
"Heavy Metal Kings"
- Released: August 1, 2006

== Charts ==
Chart (2006)	Peak position
U.S. Billboard 200	131
U.S. Top Heatseekers	1
U.S. Independent Albums	10
U.S. Top R&B/Hip-Hop Albums	50

== Awards ==
- HipHopDX 2006 awards
  - "Verse Of The Year" - "Uncommon Valor: A Vietnam Story" (performed by R.A. the Rugged Man)
