= Die, Rugged Man, Die =

Studio album by R.A. the Rugged Man
- Released: November 16, 2004
- Genre: Hip-hop
- Length: 52:02
- Label: Nature Sounds
- Producer: Marc "Nigga" Nilez, Ayatollah, Koran the L.T.D., "You can ask" Giz, Cologero, Jocko, White Mandingos, Vapor World, DJ Luciano of The Beatills, Dev One, J-Zone

R.A. the Rugged Man chronology
American Lowlife (1998)	Die, Rugged Man, Die (2004)	Legendary Classics Volume 1 (2009)

Professional ratings
Review scores
Source	Rating
HipHopDX	(7.5/10)
RapReviews	(7.5/10)
Pitchfork	(7.5/10)
Prefix Mag	(8/10)

Die, Rugged Man, Die is the debut studio album by American rapper R.A. the Rugged Man. It was released on November 16, 2004, by Nature Sounds.

This debut was over a decade in the making. R.A. the Rugged Man recorded his first album, Night of the Bloody Apes, for Jive Records in 1992 and American Lowlife for Priority Records in 1998. Although it is the Rugged Man's third album Die, Rugged Man, Die became the first album he released commercially. Guest appearances include Masta Killa, Killah Priest, Timbo King and Human Beatbox Bub. The song "Black And White" features on the THQ & Volition video game Saints Row.

== Track listing ==
No.	Title	Producer(s)	Length
1.	"Lessons"	Koran the L.T.D.	3:52
2.	"Casanova (Fly Guy)"	"You can ask" Giz and Cologero	3:47
3.	"A Star Is Born"	Marc "Nigga" Nilez	4:25
4.	"Chains" (featuring Masta Killa & Killah Priest)	Ayatollah	2:49
5.	"Dumb"	Marc "Nigga" Nilez	3:31
6.	"On the Block" (featuring Human Beatbox Bub)	Jocko	4:47
7.	"How Low"	Bad Brains	3:31
8.	"Mitch "Blood" Green (Interlude)"	Vapor World	0:32
9.	"Midnight Thud"	DJ Luciano of The Beatills & Marc "Nigga" Nilez	3:40
10.	"Black and White" (featuring Timbo King)	Dev One	3:42
11.	"Brawl"	J-Zone	3:49
12.	"Die, Rugged Man, Die!"	Marc "Nigga" Nilez	4:01
13.	"Pick My Gun Up (Skit)"	Marc "Nigga" Nilez	1:13
14.	"Da Girlz, They Luv Me" (featuring Human Beatbox Bub)	Marc "Nigga" Nilez & Human Beatbox Bub	3:22
15.	"Make Luv Outro/I Shoulda Never" (Hidden Track)	Ayatollah/Additional production by DJ Luciano of The Beatills	4:56

== Personnel ==
- Human Beatbox Bub - Beat Boxer/ vocals
- Ayatollah – producer
- Juhi Baig – stylist
- Big Earth The Midget Face – vocals
- Chris Bittner – engineer
- Calogero – producer
- Phil Cassese – vocals
- Chris Conway – mixing
- Eugine "Mean Gene" Crocket – executive
- Dan the Man – engineer
- Dev One – producer, engineer
- Sumner Dilworth – cover photo
- L. Dionne – vocals
- DJ Luciano – producer, engineer
- DJ U-vex – scratching
- Darryl Jenifer – vocals (background), producer
- Sacha Jenkins – producer
- Jocko – producer
- Marc 'Nigga' Nilez – producer
- Michael Sarsfield – mastering
