= Uncommon Valor: A Vietnam Story =

Song by Jedi mind tricks featuring R.A. the Rugged Man

Song by Jedi Mind Tricks featuring R.A. the Rugged Man

from the album Servants in Heaven, Kings in Hell
- Released: September 19, 2006
- Genre: Conscious hip hop
- Length: 4:02
- Label: Babygrande
- Songwriters: V. Luvineri; K. Baldwin; R.A. Thorburn
- Producer: Stoupe the Enemy of Mankind

"Uncommon Valor: A Vietnam Story" is a song by hip-hop duo Jedi Mind Tricks, consisting of rapper Vinnie Paz and producer Stoupe the Enemy of Mankind, and features a guest verse from R.A. the Rugged Man. It is the fourth song on the group's 2006 album Servants in Heaven, Kings in Hell. While not released as a single, the song was recognized as one of the album's standout tracks.

== Background ==
The song's producer, Stoupe the Enemy of Mankind provides a dark, minimalist beat for the track, featuring drums, bass, and a light-wailing female vocal sample. Jedi Mind Tricks vocalist Vinnie Paz provides the opening verse, a first-person narrative telling the story of a young, scared, and confused United States soldier stationed in Gia Định, who, after seeing the carnage of battle and the corruption of the Army, begins to question the real motivation behind the Vietnam War. R.A. the Rugged Man's verse recounts the war experience of his father. R.A.'s father is the highly decorated war hero, Staff Sgt. John A. Thorburn, who was nearly killed in a crash near Cambodia after his helicopter's pilot was shot. R.A.'s father reaches a moment of clarity while in the hospital and has a near-death experience, but, after being sent home, he discovers that he was exposed to Agent Orange which ultimately leaves two of his children severely mentally and physically handicapped.

== Reception ==
The key factor to the song's acclaim was the nearly two-minute verse by R.A. the Rugged Man. Album reviews referenced the verse as the highlight of the song. An AllHipHop.com review called the song, "the most insightful track JMT has done in years". The review goes on to state that, "this record will be remembered most for R.A.'s robotic flow recounting his own father's story of war while absolutely murdering the beat." HipHopDX.com writer Joshua Naber, states that it is "possibly my favorite verse of the year", calling it an "epic tale of War". The October 2006 issue of The Source magazine featured the verse as its "Hip-Hop Quotable" of the month, and listed "Uncommon Valor" on its "Fat Tape" list.

While the performance of R.A. garnered considerable attention and acclaim, it was not the sole factor in the song's popularity. An online reviewer for HipHopLinguistics.com praises the performance of Vinnie Paz, stating that he, "does a great job personalizing the effects of war." RapReviews.com reviewer Steve 'Flash' Juon described the song as, "creepy and hair-raising as hip-hop gets". Juon also praises the production work stating, "Stoupe ups the ante by sneaking in subtle sound effects that make you feel like you're right there in the jungle." MVRemix.com reviewer Michael Diston called the song a "stunning moment", while also commenting on the song's concept and fitting production, explaining, "the haunting beat does the subject matter justice – a fantastic concept and one of JMT's finest moments."

== Samples ==
The opening of the song begins with an excerpt from President Richard Nixon's resignation speech and a line from a 1950s American public service announcement, Duck and Cover, about a possible nuclear attack. The vocals were also sampled from a song called "The River is Flowing" by Basque.

== John A. Thorburn ==
Staff Sgt. John Andrew Thorburn (August 26, 1946, in St. Albans, Queens − January 7, 2010, in Port Jefferson, New York) was an American war veteran who for seven years served in the United States Army and the United States Air Force during the Vietnam War. Thorburn received several medals for his service. In the Army, he was with the 101st Airborne Division (The "Screaming Eagles"). He was later assigned with the Green Berets into the 10th Special Forces Group. In June 1968, Thorburn transferred to the Air Force.

On March 14, 1970, Thorburn was on a long-range reconnaissance patrol (LRRP) from the Ban Me Thuot East Airfield in South Vietnam aboard a UH-1P "Papa" Huey helicopter as a member of the 20th Special Operations Squadron (The "Green Hornets"). The helicopter was shot down near the Duc Lap Special Forces Camp by enemy ground fire which resulted in pilot USAF Capt Dana Allen Dilley's death and three wounded airmen, with Thorburn and the other gunner sustaining serious injuries. An Army helicopter from the 155th Assault Helicopter Company on the same operation retrieved the airmen and took them to Cam Ranh Air Base. Thorburn was later medically discharged from the Air Force following injuries he received.

Staff Sergeant Thorburn was awarded the Conspicuous Service Cross by New York State Senator John J. Flanagan for his accomplishments in the Vietnam War. He also earned several awards and decorations from the United States Army and Air Force, including the Distinguished Flying Cross (twice), Purple Heart, and Air Medal (four times).

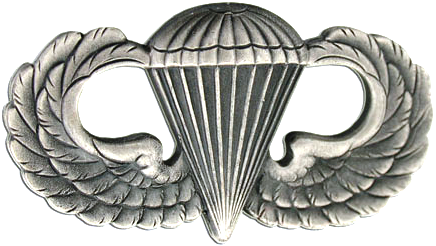

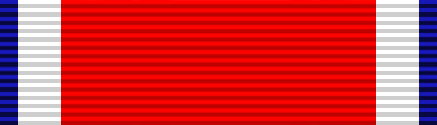

Badge 1	United States Air Force Enlisted Aircrew Badge		
Badge 2	United States Army Parachutist Badge		
1st row	Distinguished Flying Cross with Oak Leaf Cluster		Purple Heart
2nd row	Air Medal with 3 Oak Leaf Clusters	Air Force Good Conduct Medal	Army Good Conduct Medal
3rd row	National Defense Service Medal	Vietnam Service Medal	Small Arms Expert Marksmanship Ribbon
4th row	Republic of Vietnam Gallantry Cross with Palm	Republic of Vietnam Campaign Medal	Conspicuous Service Cross
