= R.A. the Rugged Man =

American rapper

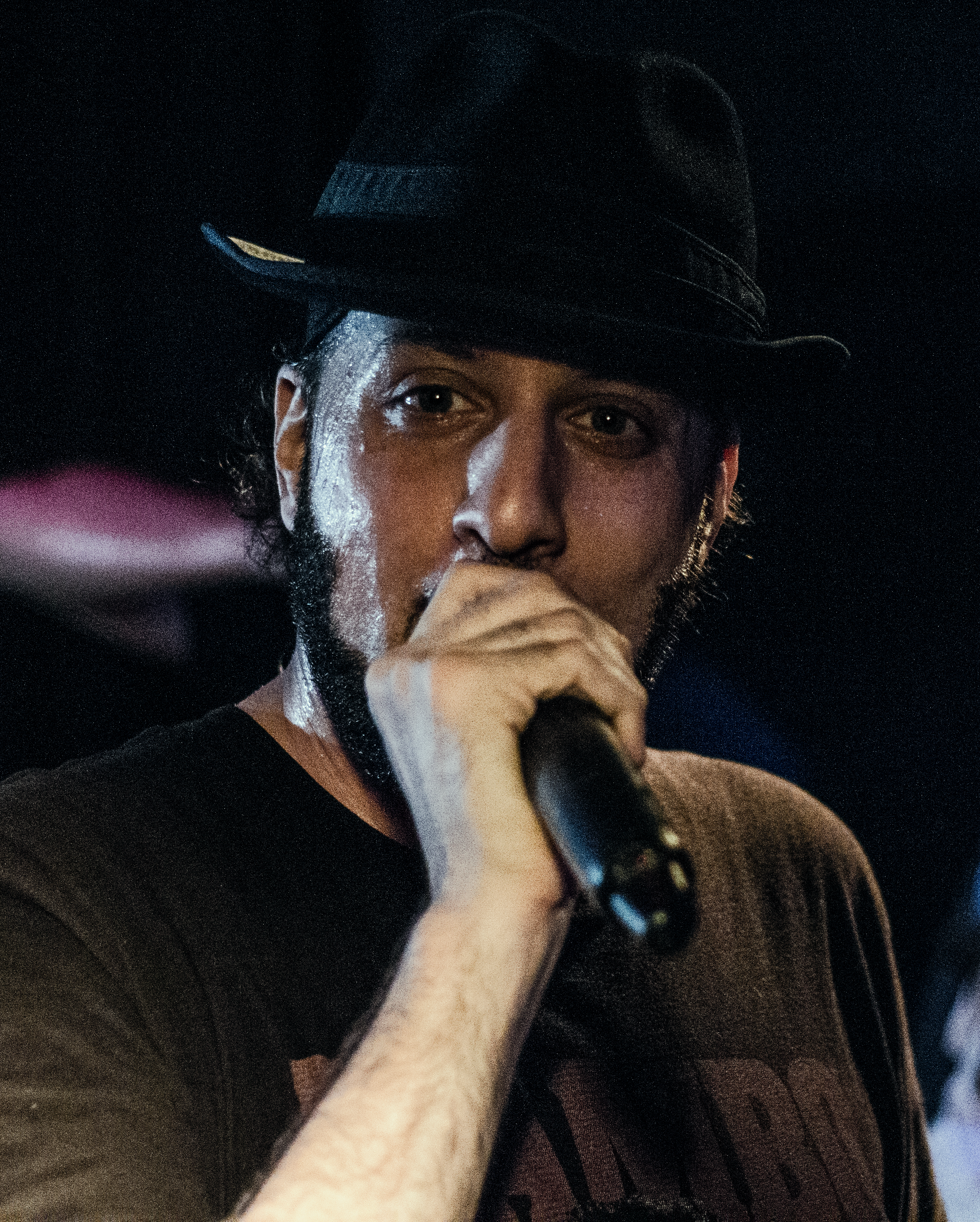
- R.A. the Rugged Man in 2017

Background information
- Born: Richard Andrew Thorburn; Suffolk County, New York, U.S.
- Genre: Hip-hop
- Occupations: Rapper, producer
- Years active: 1992–present
- Labels: Nature Sounds, Ingrooves (current) Jive, Capitol, Priority (former)
- Website: ratheruggedman.net

R.A. Thorburn (born January 10, 1974), better known by his stage name R.A. the Rugged Man, is an American rapper and producer. He began his music career at age 12, building a reputation locally for his lyrical skills. Thorburn signed with major label Jive Records at age 18, but his debut album, Night of the Bloody Apes, was never released.

He was featured on all three of Rawkus's Soundbombing albums, as well as the platinum-selling WWF Aggression album. After a brief stint on Capitol Records (during which he recorded another unreleased album, American Lowlife), Thorburn signed with independent label Nature Sounds and released his official debut, Die, Rugged Man, Die. In 2013, Thorburn released his second album, Legends Never Die, via Nature Sounds.

In addition to his hip-hop career, Thorburn has contributed to Vibe, King, Complex, Rides, XXL, The Source, The Ring, among others. He wrote and produced the cult film Bad Biology, and also hosts the web series "Film School" on MTV's Film.com.

== Career ==
=== 1992–2003: Beginnings ===
In 1992, Thorburn signed with Jive Records, then in the mid-1990s signed with Priority Records/EMI. His contract was later absorbed by Capitol Records, but he began recording independently in the early 2000s. He was featured on all three of Rawkus's Soundbombing albums, as well as the platinum-selling WWF Aggression album, performing the theme song for Chris Jericho. In Ego Trip Vol. 1, Issue 3, The Notorious B.I.G. was quoted as saying, "And I thought I was the illest," when referring to Thorburn.

=== 2004–2012: Die, Rugged Man, Die; film cameos; & magazine writing ===
In 2004, Thorburn released his first album Die, Rugged Man, Die through Brooklyn-based label Nature Sounds. He has cameos in several music videos including Havoc from Mobb Deep's I'm the Boss, Sadat X's Throw the Ball and Masta Killa's Old Man featuring RZA and Ol' Dirty Bastard.

Thorburn's verse on Jedi Mind Tricks' "Uncommon Valor: A Vietnam Story", depicting his father's experience in the war was widely praised and named by HipHopDX as the "Verse of the Year".

Thorburn wrote a monthly movie column for Mass Appeal Magazine, was a contributor to The Ego Trip Book of Rap Lists (St. Martin's Press) and Ego Trip's Big Book of Racism (HarperCollins), and has written numerous articles for other magazines including Vibe, King, Complex, Rides and XXL.

A horror film fan, Thorburn has written three screenplays with cult film director Frank Henenlotter and is writer-producer of the Henenlotter film Bad Biology. The film has an original score by Josh Glazer (J. Glaze) with additional production by Prince Paul, and cameos by Playboy model Jelena Jensen and Penthouse Pet Krista Ayne. Thorburn is working on his directorial debut, a film based on his family, God Take, God Give.

=== 2013–present: Legends Never Die and All My Heroes Are Dead ===
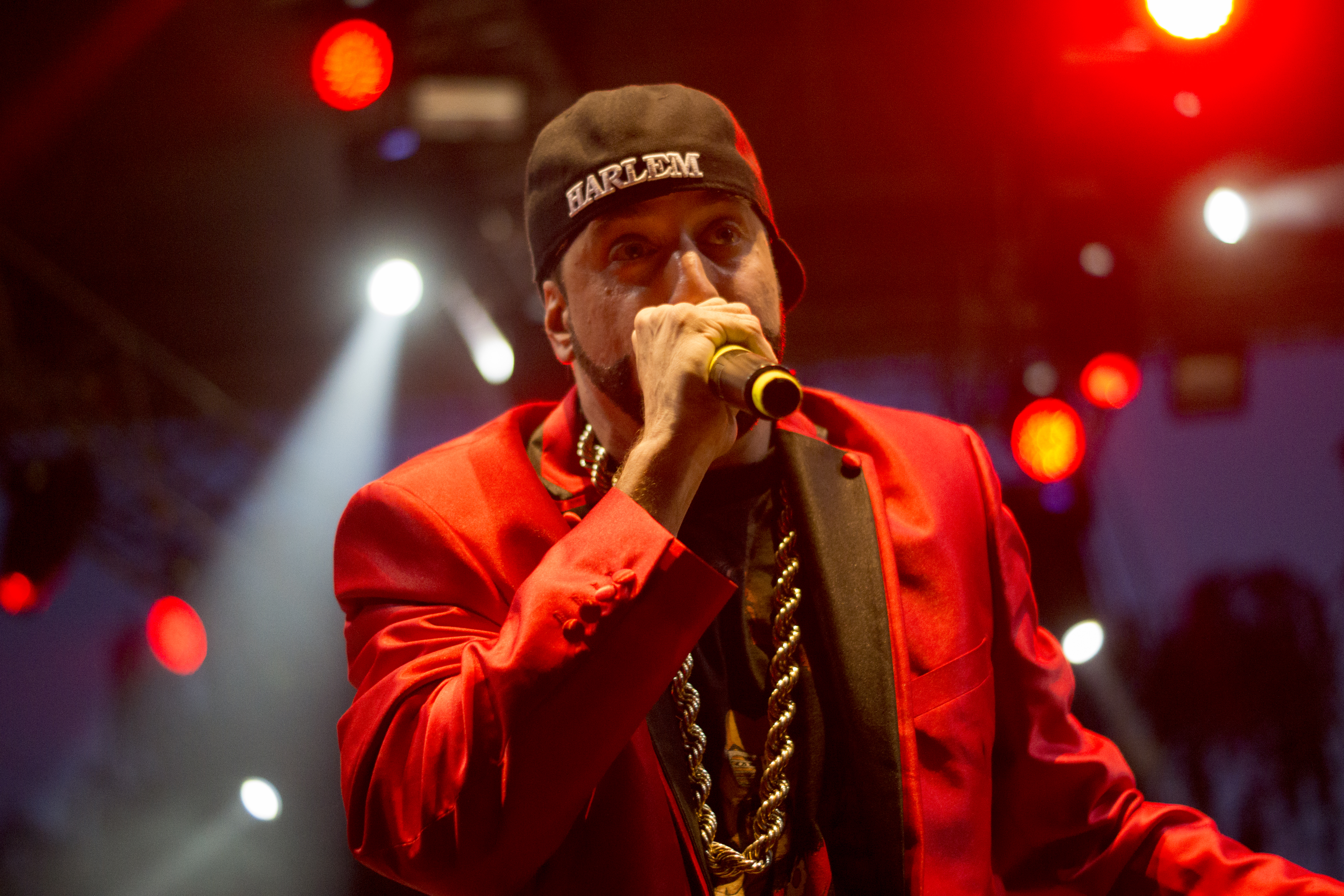
Performing in 2013

Thorburn's second studio album Legends Never Die was released on April 30, 2013. Guest appearances include Brother Ali, Masta Ace, Tech N9ne, Talib Kweli, Hopsin, Eamon, and Krizz Kaliko. His first single of the album was "The Peoples Champ", the second was "Learn Truth" feat. Talib Kweli. Upon release the album debuted at number 1 on the US Billboard Heatseekers Albums chart, number 17 on the Billboard Top R&B/Hip-Hop Albums chart, and at number 131 on the Billboard 200. In 2016, Thorburn was featured on German rapper Kool Savas studio album Essahdamus on the song "Wahre Liebe".

The third studio album by Thorburn, All My Heroes Are Dead, was released on April 17, 2020 and debuted #22 on the US Billboard Top Current Album Sales and #3 on the UK R&B Albums. It features artists like Ghostface Killah, Eamon, Atmosphere, Ice-T, Vinnie Paz, Brand Nubian, Chino XL, M.O.P. and Onyx.

On a December 2021 podcast hosted by political commentator Tim Pool, Thorburn nearly got into an altercation with Pool on air after Pool called him a "racist prick". Thorburn claimed Pool had never experienced racism, and he also accused Pool of promoting Derek Chauvin, and making excuses for the men who murdered Ahmaud Arbery, saying to Pool that "lives have been lost by police, and you were there bootlicking the fucking cops."

== Personal life ==
Thorburn's father, Staff Sgt. John A. Thorburn, was a Vietnam veteran. His brother Maxx was born disabled and blind, eventually dying at the age of 10. Thorburn's sister, Dee Ann, died in 2007 at the age of 26. Thorburn tells his father's story in "Uncommon Valor: A Vietnam Story," from the Jedi Mind Tricks album Servants in Heaven, Kings in Hell. John A. Thorburn died of cancer on January 7, 2010. Thorburn is of German, Scottish and Sicilian descent.

Thorburn has three children: Ella (born in 2016), John A. (born in 2017), and Rosa Valentina Thorburn (born in 2026).

== Discography ==
Studio albums

- Die, Rugged Man, Die (2004)
- Legends Never Die (2013)
- All My Heroes Are Dead (2020)

== Filmography ==
Film
Year	Show	Role	Notes
2008	Three Thug Mice	Vic	(Short)
2008	Bad Biology	Ex-Boyfriend (as R.A. the Rugged Man)	Also writer and producer
2009	Damnation	Film Crew Guy #1	(Short)
2013	Skid Row	John	
TBA	Suicide Disco	Director, writer, producer	Post-production
