= Ill Bill discography =

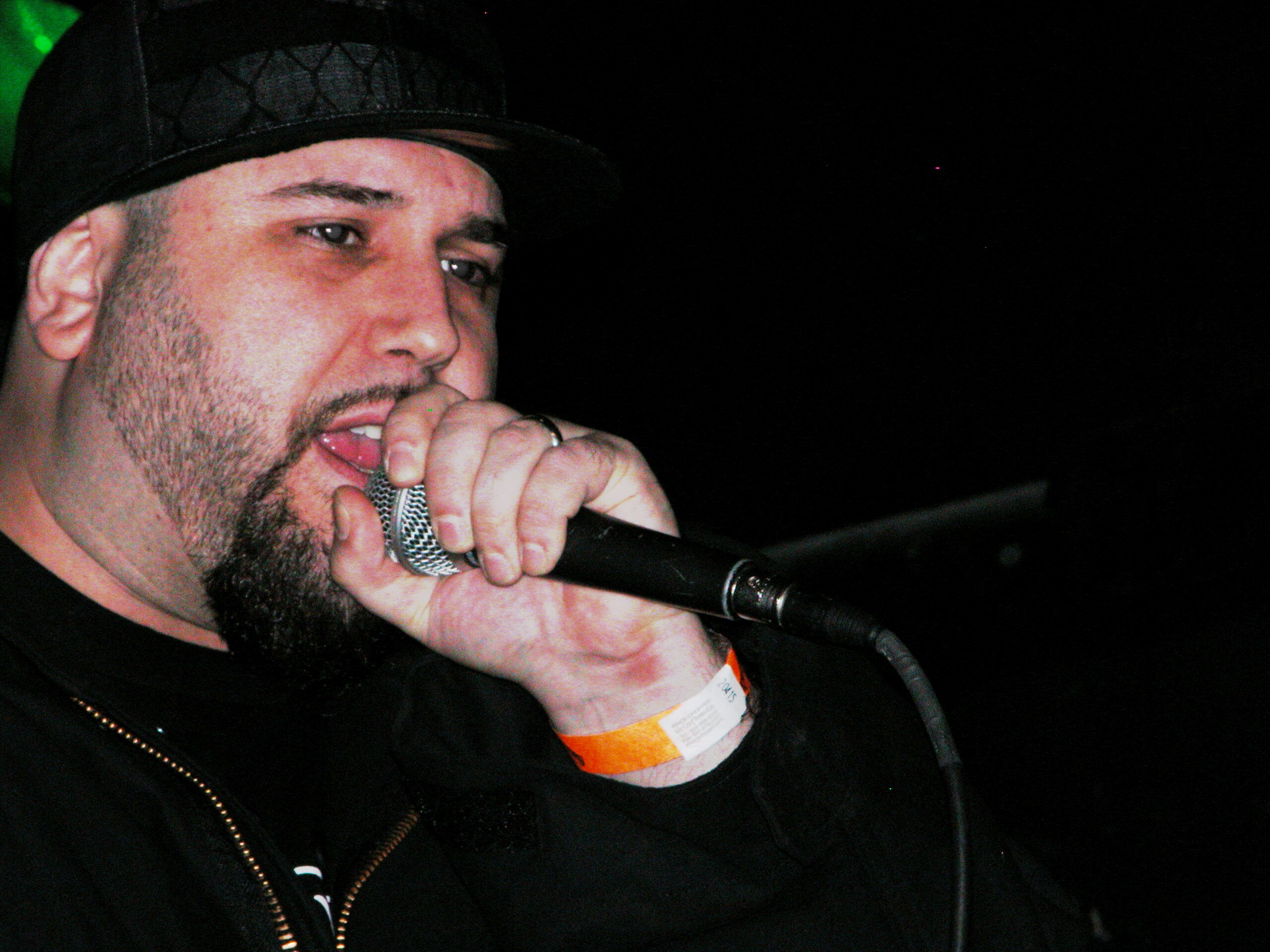
- Studio albums: 6
- Extended plays: 3
- Compilation albums: 10
- Music videos: 26

This is the discography of American rapper Ill Bill.

== Albums ==
=== Studio albums ===
List of solo studio albums, with selected chart positions
Title	Album details	Peak chart positions			
Title	Album details	US HH	US Rap	US Indie	US Heat.
What's Wrong with Bill?	Released: May 4, 2004; Label: Psycho+Logical-Records	—	—	—	—
The Hour of Reprisal	Released: September 16, 2008; Label: Uncle Howie Records, Fat Beats	67	—	40	13
The Grimy Awards	Released: February 26, 2013; Label: Uncle Howie Records	75	—	—	39
Septagram	Released: June 10, 2016; Label: Uncle Howie Records	—	—	—	—
La Bella Medusa	Released: October 30, 2020; Label: Uncle Howie Records	—	—	—	—
Billy	Released: March 31, 2023; Label: Uncle Howie Records	—	—	—	—

=== Collaborative albums ===
List of collaborative studio albums, with selected chart positions
Title	Album details	Peak chart positions			
Title	Album details	US HH	US Rap	US Indie	US Heat.
The Future Is Now (with DJ Eclipse, Goretex & Sabac Red, as Non Phixion)	Released: March 26, 2002; Label: Uncle Howie Records	65	—	14	14
The Green CD/DVD (with DJ Eclipse, Goretex & Sabac Red, as Non Phixion)	Released: April 6, 2004; Label: Uncle Howie Records	—	—	—	—
The Circle Of Tyrants (with Goretex, Mr. Hyde & Necro, as the Circle Of Tyrants)	Released: September 13, 2005; Label: Psycho+Logical-Records	—	—	—	—
A Brand You Can Trust (with Danny Boy, DJ Lethal, Everlast & Slaine, as La Coka Nostra)	Released: July 14, 2009; Label: Suburban Noize Records	43	—	—	—
Kill Devil Hills (with DJ Muggs)	Released: August 31, 2010; Label: Fat Beats	47	21	—	17
Heavy Metal Kings (with Vinnie Paz, as Heavy Metal Kings)	Released: April 1, 2011; Label: Enemy Soil	48	24	50	7
Masters of the Dark Arts (with Danny Boy, DJ Lethal & Slaine, as La Coka Nostra)	Released: July 31, 2012; Label: Fat Beats	31	—	40	—
To Thine Own Self Be True (with Danny Boy, DJ Lethal & Slaine, as La Coka Nostra)	Released: November 4, 2016; Label: Fat Beats	38	—	—	—
Black God White Devil (with Vinnie Paz, as Heavy Metal Kings)	Released: October 27, 2017; Label: Enemy Soil	—	—	—	—
Cannibal Hulk (with Stu Bangas)	Released: March 29, 2019; Label: Fat Beats	—	—	44	—
Gorilla Twins (with Nems, as Gorilla Twins)	Released: May 22, 2020; Label: Fat Beats	—	—	—	—
"—" denotes releases that did not chart, or was not released in that country.

=== Demos ===
Title	Album details
The Cursed Earth (with Mike Palmeri & Necro, as Injustice)	Released: 1989
Inhuman Conditions (with Mike Palmeri & Necro, as Injustice)	Released: 1990
The Early Years: Rare Demos '91–'94	Released: September 16, 2003; Label: Psycho+Logical-Records

=== Compilations ===
Title	Album details
The Past, The Present and the Future Is Now (with DJ Eclipse, Goretex & Sabac Red, as Non Phixion)	Released: 2000; Label: Uncle Howie Records
Black Metal	Released: 2007; Label: Uncle Howie Records
Howie Made Me Do It	Released: 2008; Label: Uncle Howie Records
Holy Diver	Released: 2010; Label: Uncle Howie Records
Howie Made Me Do It 2	Released: 2011; Label: Uncle Howie Records
Howie Made Me Do It 3	Released: 2013; Label: Uncle Howie Records

=== Mixtapes ===
Title	Album details
Ill Bill Is the Future	Released: February 11, 2003; Label: Uncle Howie Records
Ill Bill Is the Future Vol. II: I'm a Goon!	Released: November 16, 2006; Label: Uncle Howie Records
La Coka Nostra Radio Vol. One (Hosted by Danny Boy)	Released: 2007; Label: Uncle Howie Records
The Height Of Power (with Danny Boy, DJ Lethal, Everlast & Slaine, as La Coka Nostra)	Released: 2009
The Audacity Of Coke (with Danny Boy, DJ Lethal, Everlast & Slaine, as La Coka Nostra)	Released: 2009

=== Extended plays ===
Title	Album details
Infermo Guillermo's	Released: 2009; Label: Uncle Howie Records
100% Pure Coka (with Danny Boy, DJ Lethal, Everlast & Slaine, as La Coka Nostra)	Released: 2009; Label: Uncle Howie Records
Pulp Phixion (with Sunday)	Released: July 26, 2019; Label: Tuff Kong Records

=== Instrumental albums ===
Title	Album details
Beats By Bill	Released: June 18, 2019; Label: Psycho+Logical-Records

== Singles ==
Singles
Title	Info
Gangsta Rap	Released: 1999; Label(s): Psycho+Logical-Records; B-sides: "How to Kill a Cop"
The Anatomy of a School Shooting	Released: April 16, 2004; Label(s): Psycho+Logical-Records; B-sides: "Unstoppable"
God Is an Atheist	Released: April 30, 2004; Label(s): Beatdown Recordings; B-sides: "The Name's Bill"

== Guest appearances ==
Year	Song title(s)	Other performer(s)	Album(s)
2000	"Simian D AKA Feeling Ignorant"	Company Flow	Def Jux Presents...
2000	"The Most Sadistic"	Necro	I Need Drugs
2000	"You're Dead"	Necro	I Need Drugs
2001	"Circle of Tyrants"	Necro, Mr. Hyde, Goretex, Captain Carnage	Gory Days
2001	"Poetry in the Streets"	Necro	Gory Days
2001	"Let's Go"	Troy Dunnit	N/A
2001	"14 Yrs of Rap"	Jise One, Q-Unique, Goretex	Past, Present, and Future
2002	"Delorean"	El-P	Fantastic Damage
2002	"Yae Yo"	The Beatnuts, Problemz	The Originators
2002	"License 2 Ill"	DJ JS-1, Dub-L	Ground Original
2003	"The Wolf"	Jedi Mind Tricks, Sabac Red	Visions of Gandhi
2003	"2004"	Obscure Disorder, Goretex	Rugged Radio Saturday
2004	"Canarsie Artie's Revenge"	Q-Unique, Goretex, Necro	Vengeance Is Mine
2004	"This Thing of Ours"	Q-Unique	Vengeance Is Mine
2004	"P.O.W.'s"	Sabac Red, Mr. Hyde, Necro, Goretex	Sabacolypse: A Change Gon' Come
2004	"The Virtual Goat"	Goretex	The Art of Dying
2004	"The Crazies"	Mr. Hyde, Goretex, Necro	Barn of the Naked Dead
2004	"Street Veteran Part 2"	Mr. Hyde, Necro	Barn of the Naked Dead
2004	"Them"	Mr. Hyde, Necro, Goretex	Barn of the Naked Dead
2004	"The Crazies ('86 Metal Mix)"	Mr. Hyde, Goretex, Necro	Barn of the Naked Dead
2004	"Nirvana"	Necro, Mr. Hyde, Goretex	The Pre-Fix for Death
2005	"Goons & Assassins"	Onry Ozzborn	In Between
2005	"Edge Play"	Necro, Mr. Hyde, Michelle Matlock, Katja Kassin	The Sexorcist
2005	"She's Got a Great Ass"	Necro, Jerry Butler	The Sexorcist
2005	"I Degrade You"	Necro	The Sexorcist
2005	"Rise Above"	Danny Diablo, G-Fella, Everlast	Street C.D. Volume #2
2006	"Karma"	MF Grimm, Block McCloud	American Hunger
2006	"Heavy Metal Kings"	Jedi Mind Tricks	Servants in Heaven, Kings in Hell
2006	"Dead Serious"	Verbal Kent, Lance Ambu	Move With The Walls
2006	"Ten Wheel Drive"	Sick Jacken, Cynic	The Terror Tapes Vol. 1
2006	"Prize Fighters"	Q-Unique	Street Supreme
2006	"The Dialogue"	MC Lars	The Graduate
2007	"Stick & Move"	Killa Sha, Born Unique	God Walk on Water
2007	"Project Prophecy"	Blue Sky Black Death, Hell Razah, Sabac Red	Razah's Ladder
2007	"Come One, Come All"	Styles P	The Ghost Sessions
2007	"Dirty Money"	Special Teamz	Stereotypez
2007	"Bring Back the Raw Hip-Hop"	Sicknature, Q-Unique	Honey I'm Home
2007	"As Deadly as Can Be"	Necro	Death Rap
2007	"Bangmatic"	Stu Bangas, Reef the Lost Cauze, Slaine	Volume I
2007	"Metal Music"	El Gant	Quit Your Day Job
2007	"Awaiting the Hour"	Killah Priest	Priestisms
2008	"Black Snow"	Snowgoons, Apathy	Black Snow
2008	"I'm From Brooklyn"	Brooklyn Academy	Bored of Education
2008	"Apocalypse Now"	Eric "Bobo" Correa, B-Real, Sick Jacken	Meeting of the Minds
2008	"When the Lights Go Out"	Sabac Red	The Ritual
2008	"Darkness Deepens"	Sabac Red, Slaine	The Ritual
2008	"Killer Collage"	Mr. Hyde, Q-Unique	Chronicles of the Beast Man
2008	"Verbal Holocaust"	Randam Luck	Conspiracy of Silence
2008	"Play Ya Part"	King Syze, Doap Nixon	The Labor Union
2009	"Remove the Gag"	Verbal Kent, Kaz 1, Wordsworth	Brave New Rap
2009	"I Don't Mind"	DJ JS-1, Slaine, Virtuoso	Ground Original 2: No Sell Out
2009	"Verbal Holocaust" (Remix)	Randam Luck	Graveyard Shift
2009	"Beware of the Pale Horse"	William "Booth" Cooper	Beware of the Pale Horse
2009	"From RP to BK"	Sherlock Flows, Real Falk	Meisterwerk
2009	"Body Harvest"	ArchNME	Body Harvest EP
2009	"Hit That Shit"	Thekeenone, B-Real, Reg Riddem	Getaway
2010	"X and Bill"	Sadat X	Wild Cowboys II
2010	"Order & Chaos"	Diabolic	Liar & a Thief
2010	"Open Mic Surgery"	Rhyme Asylum	Solitary Confinement
2010	"Brick Wall"	Vinnie Paz, Demoz	Season of the Assassin
2010	"Dark Knight"	Q-Unique, Jise One	Between Heaven & Hell
2010	"Rap Assassins"	Ruste Juxx, Cyrus Malachi, Sav Killz	Adamantine
2010	"Psalm of Satan"	Killah Priest, Sabac Red	The 3 Day Theory
2010	"Devil's Eye"	John Regan, Juganot	Sorry I'm Late
2010	"Bare Knuckle Boxing"	7L & Esoteric, Vinnie Paz, Reef the Lost Cauze	1212
2010	"Ahead of the Game"	Life MC, Chester P	Life Beyond Rap
2010	"The Uncrushables"	Snowgoons, Sabac Red	Kraftwerk
2010	"Crillionaires"	Slaine	A World with No Skies
2010	"Science of the Trife"	Slaine, Q-Unique	The Devil Never Dies
2010	"Verbal Abyss"	The White Shadow	Destiny
2010	"Rule the Wurld"	Touch, E-Dot	Alienated
2010	"1 Am"	Rude Boi, Ladii J	Tha Making of a Legend
2010	"Junkie Bullshit"	The Havknotz	Music Life Pain
2011	"The Villain"	Apathy	Honkey Kong
2011	"Demonic Prophecies"	OuterSpace	My Brother's Keeper
2011	"Murder the DJ"	DJ JS-1, Blaq Poet, Ruste Juxx	Ground Original 3: No One Cares
2011	"Hannibal Rapper"	Clementino	I.E.N.A.
2011	"Pounding Metal"	Kaos 13, G-Fella	Street Warriors
2011	"The Boulevard"	Slaine, Sean Price, Blacastan	A World with No Skies 2.0
2011	"Golden Casket"	King Syze, Vinnie Paz	Collective Bargaining
2011	"Microphone Killa"	Potluck, Slaine	Rhymes and Resin
2011	"4 Profits"	Da Circle, Math Hoffa	360° Deal
2011	"Offensive Lines"	Slaine, Action Bronson	State of Grace
2012	"Deadly Sins"	Vinnie Paz, Doap Nixon, King Magnetic, Reef the Lost Cauze	The Priest of Bloodshed
2012	"Santa Sangre"	Vinnie Paz	The Priest of Bloodshed
2012	"Golden Casket"	Vinnie Paz, King Syze	The Priest of Bloodshed
2012	"Family First"	Illus	Family First
2012	"Death Wish"	Stu Bangas, Blaq Poet, Wais P	Diggaz With Attitude
2012	"The Realest"	Stu Bangas, Slaine	Diggaz With Attitude
2012	"The Legacy"	Snowgoons, Esoteric, Fredro Starr, Godilla, M-Dot, Maylay Sparks, Planetary, Punchline, Reef the Lost Cauze, Reks, Sav Killz, Sicknature, Swann, Thirstin Howl III, Virtuoso	Snowgoons Dynasty
2012	"Solomon Grundy"	Sean Price, Ike Eyes	Mic Tyson
2012	"Addictionary"	MHz, Slaine	MHz Legacy
2012	"The Walking Dead"	Ruste Juxx, The Arcitype, Guilty Simpson, Shabaam Sahdeeq	V.I.C.
2012	"Sometimes"	Trinity, Eternia, Everlast, Grand Puba, Immortal Technique, MC D-Stroy, Reef the Lost Cauze, Roc Marciano, Roxanne Shanté, Sha Stimuli, Slug, The Audible Doctor	20 In
2012	"Corrupt"	Trinity, Immortal Technique	20 In
2012	"Plug In"	Roman Penpointz, Charlie Chan	Suspicious Deaths
2012	"The First Shall Be Last"	Conspiracy Theories	Conspiracy Theories
2012	"Take My Respect"	Banish	Dredgar Cayce
2012	"From RP to BK 2012"	DJ Apoc, Sherlock Flows	The Mark of the Beats
2012	"Don't Sleep"	Professor Fresh, Ill Poe	Great Made Stupid
2013	"Death to You"	Swollen Members, Vinnie Paz, Slaine	Beautiful Death Machine
2013	"Ill World Order"	Shaz Illyork	The Revival EP
2013	"Savages"	Marco Polo, Slaine, Celph Titled	PA2: The Director's Cut
2013	"Repercussions"	Esoteric, Stu Bangas	Machete Mode
2013	"Violent Rage"	Sicknature, Vinnie Paz	Nature of the Contaminated
2013	"Black Snow 2"	Snowgoons, Apathy, Celph Titled	Black Snow 2
2013	"Reel Wolf Presents the Underworld (Goon MuSick Remix)"	Snowgoons, Apathy, Bizarre, Celph Titled, King Gordy, PMD, Reef the Lost Cauze, Sean Strange, Slaine, Swifty McVay, Tech N9NE, Vinnie Paz, Sid Wilson	Black Snow 2
2013	"Vio-Lence"	DJ Skizz, Lil' Fame	BQE (The Brooklyn-Queens Experience)
2013	"Listen to the Words"	Q-Unique	Marvels Team-Up
2013	"Science of the Trife"	Q-Unique, Slaine	Marvels Team-Up
2013	"Dexter's Lab"	Block McCloud, DJ Waxwork, Just One	Four Walls
2014	"Children of the Revolution"	Slaine	The King of Everything Else
2014	"Eye for an Eye"	Briggs	Sheplife
2014	"Profreshionals"	DJ JS-1, Slaine	Ground Original 4: It Is What It Isn't
2014	"Three Amigos"	El Gant, Chris Webby	Beast Academy
2014	"B613 Murder Team"	Post-Apocalyptic	State of the Art
2014	"All I Want to Do"	K. Daver, L-Maze	We the People
2014	"Lights Out"	Dubie, Big Left	Warpath Underworld
2014	"Nation of Goons"	DJ Connect, Alucard, Critical, Ide, Jise One, U.G.	Well Connected
2014	"Seppuku"	Inception, Diabolic, Meth Mouth, Sean Price, Sean Strange	The Aftermath
2015	"Feed of the Morning"	Jise One	The Passion of Jise
2015	"The Cycle"	William "Booth" Cooper, Trife Diesel	God's Will
2015	"Destro"	Adlib, Rob The Viking	Teenagers From Marz
2015	"MurderRap"	Verbal Skillz, DJ Stix	VerbalVision
2015	"Van Gogh"	Snowgoons, Morlockk Dilemma	Gebrüder Grimm
2015	"Introduction"	MoSS, Inspectah Deck	Marching to the Sound of My Own Drum
2016	"Kevlar Bodybags"	Timeless Truth	Cold Wave
2016	"Fuck the Internet"	Snak the Ripper	From the Dirt
2016	"Legendary"	Slaine, Jared Evan, Vinnie Paz	Slaine Is Dead
2016	"Paranoia"	Nizuk, Novatore	Course Contre La Mort
2016	"Killaz Supreme"	Snowgoons, Aspects, Ghostface Killah, Sick Jacken	Goon Bap
2016	"Most Thoro"	Spartack, DJ Kamistry	Encre Mortelle
2017	"Reversal of Fortune"	Junior Makhno	Party Discipline
2017	"Delete"	Watson & Holmes, 7L	The Uncanny Adventures of Watson & Holmes
2017	"Apocalypse"	Slaine, Termanology, Nems	Anti-Hero
2017	"Bully Zone"	Chan Hays, Conway the Machine	Here
2018	"No Country for Old Men"	Q-Unique	The Mechanic
2018	"Cult Leader & Capital"	Q-Unique, DJ Eclipse	The Mechanic
2018	"HaShem on a Pentagram"	Vinnie Paz, Goretex	The Pain Collector
2018	"Criminal Ideas"	Snak the Ripper, Reef the Lost Cauze	Off the Rails
2018	"The Drill"	Wisecrvcker, Twisted Insane	Supreme Paradigm Act I: The Grand Scheme
2019	"Insidious"	Novatore	Louie LP
2019	"Goon Infantry"	Snowgoons, Nems, Nocturnal	Infantry
2019	"Fibre Optic Weapons"	Vinnie Paz, Tragedy Khadafi	Camouflage Regime
2019	"Fly Off the Handle"	Truth	The Fight For Survival
2019	"Pop Up"	Stu Bangas, Lord Goat	Discernment
2019	"Still Got My Gun"	Slaine, Vinnie Paz, Rite Hook	One Day
2020	"Hey Young World"	Snowgoons, Everlast, Heltah Skeltah, Slaine	The Trojan Horse
2020	"Virtual Goat"	Lord Goat	Coffin Syrup
2020	"Metal Lords"	Lil' Eto, Lord Goat, Vinnie Paz	The Beauty of It
2020	"Bullet Train"	Recognize Ali, Stu Bangas, Lord Goat	Guerilla Dynasty
2020	"Death Itself"	Recognize Ali, Apocalypse	Recognition
2020	"Wake Up Pt. 2"	Killarmy	Full Metal Jackets
2020	"Mystics In Bali"	Lord Goat, Stu Bangas	Final Expenses
2020	"Live From Mexico"	Lord Goat, Stu Bangas, Spit Gemz, Blizz	Final Expenses
2021	"When the War Ends"	Slaine	The Things We Can't Forgive
2021	"Street Smarts"	Eric "Bobo" Correa, Stu Bangas, O.C.	Empires
2021	"Witches Teeth"	Vinnie Paz, Lord Goat	Burn Everything That Bears Your Name
2021	"Off With His Head"	Ransom, Big Ghost LTD, Vinnie Paz	Heavy Is the Head
2021	"Abdallah Azzam Brigade"	Jedi Mind Tricks, Chinaski Black, Demoz, Recognize Ali	The Funeral & the Raven
2021	"Tha Boro"	Nems, Eddie Kane, Rim	Congo
2021	"Mad Energy"	Onyx, Ras Kass	#Turndafucup (The Original Sessions)
2021	"Godly Men"	Recognize Ali, Vinnie Paz	Underground King II
2021	"Father Time"	DJ Muggs	Winter 2
2021	"So What You Wanna Do"	Stu Bangas, Vinnie Paz	Death Wish
2022	"Tales From the Darkside"	C-Lance, Snak the Ripper	The Undying Flame
2022	"Tryna Survive"	Cappadonna, Stu Bangas	3rd Chamber Grail Bars
2022	"Father Yod"	Vinnie Paz, Lord Goat	Tortured in the Name of God's Unconditional Love
2023	"Crime Ministers"	Mickey Blue, Dro Pesci, Jay Royale	A Long Time Coming
2023	"Gangsters & Goblins"	Benny Holiday	Carolina Messiah
2023	"Beausoleil Wiretaps"	Vinnie Paz, Lord Goat	All Are Guests in the House of God
2023	"You Don't Like Me"	Obnoxious	Sic Audio
2023	"Suicide Choir"	Novatore, Lord Goat, C-Lance	Alchemy and Black Magic

== Production credits ==
List of songs produced and/or co-produced, with other performing artists, showing year released and album name
Year	Song	Artist	Album	Notes
2003	"Getcha Hustle On / Horse & Pills"	Deadwate	Dinnertime	prod. w/ Tes The Sicilian & Rob Boogie
2004	"Chasing the Dragon" (Moshpit Mix)	Ill Bill, Necro	What's Wrong with Bill?	prod. w/ Necro
2006	"Billion$ on My Mind"	Ill Bill	Ill Bill Is the Future Vol.II: I'm a Goon!	N/A
2006	"Brazil"	Ill Bill, Raekwon	Ill Bill Is the Future Vol.II: I'm a Goon!	prod. w/ Q-Unique
2006	"21"	Ill Bill	Ill Bill Is the Future Vol.II: I'm a Goon!	prod. w/ Sicknature
2006	"Cocaine World"	Raekwon	Ill Bill Is the Future Vol.II: I'm a Goon!	N/A
2006	"Thousands to M's" (Remix)	Ill Bill, Raekwon, Skam2?	Ill Bill Is the Future Vol.II: I'm a Goon!	prod. w/ Q-Unique
2006	"The Dialogue"	MC Lars, Ill Bill	The Graduate	prod. w/ Q-Unique
2007	"Gun Ballad"	Army of the Pharaohs	Ritual of Battle	prod. w/ Sicknature
2007	"Seven"	Army of the Pharaohs	Ritual of Battle	prod. w/ Sicknature
2007	"Stereotypez"	Special Teamz	Stereotypez	N/A
2008	"Play Ya Part (P.Y.P.)"	King Syze, Doap Nixon, Ill Bill	The Labor Union	prod. w/ Sicknature
2008	"Doomsday Was Written in an Alien Bible"	Ill Bill	The Hour of Reprisal	N/A
2008	"Trust Nobody"	Ill Bill	The Hour of Reprisal	N/A
2008	"White Nigger"	Ill Bill	The Hour of Reprisal	N/A
2008	"My Uncle"	Ill Bill	The Hour of Reprisal	prod. w/ Sicknature
2008	"Riya"	Ill Bill, H.R., Darryl Jenifer	The Hour of Reprisal	N/A
2008	"War Is My Destiny"	Ill Bill, Immortal Technique, Max Cavalera	The Hour of Reprisal	N/A
2008	"Coka Moschiach"	Ill Bill, Raekwon	The Hour of Reprisal	N/A
2008	"Soap" (Skit)	N/A	The Hour of Reprisal	N/A
2008	"I'm a Goon"	Ill Bill	The Hour of Reprisal	prod. w/ Sicknature
2008	"When the Lights Go Out"	Sabac Red, Ill Bill	The Ritual	N/A
2009	"Cousin of Death"	La Coka Nostra	A Brand You Can Trust	prod. w/ DJ Lethal
2010	"Gutta Talk"	Q-Unique, Jise One	Between Heaven & Hell	prod. w/ Q-Unique
2011	"Children of God"	Heavy Metal Kings	Heavy Metal Kings	N/A
2011	"King Diamond"	Heavy Metal Kings	Heavy Metal Kings	N/A
2011	"The Final Call"	Heavy Metal Kings	Heavy Metal Kings	N/A
2012	"Family First"	Illus, Ill Bill	Family First	N/A
2012	"Letter to Ouisch"	La Coka Nostra	Masters of the Dark Arts	prod. w/ DJ Lethal
2012	"The Eyes of Santa Muerte"	La Coka Nostra, Sick Jacken	Masters of the Dark Arts	N/A
2012	"Malverde Market"	La Coka Nostra	Masters of the Dark Arts	N/A
2013	"What Does It All Mean?"	Ill Bill	The Grimy Awards	N/A
2013	"Exploding Octopus"	Ill Bill	The Grimy Awards	N/A
2013	"Forty Deuce Hebrew"	Ill Bill, H.R.	The Grimy Awards	N/A
2013	"Ooohhhhh!!"	Q-Unique	Marvels Team-Up	N/A
2013	"In the Sky"	Serial Killers	Serial Killers Vol. 1	N/A
2013	"Six Billion Ways"	Serial Killers	Serial Killers Vol. 1	N/A
2013	"No Comin' Back"	Serial Killers	Serial Killers Vol. 1	N/A
2016	"Trailer (Intro)"	Ill Bill	Septagram™	N/A
2016	"Embrace Your Satan"	Ill Bill, Goretex	Septagram™	N/A
2020	"Twinning"	Ill Bill, Nems	Gorilla Twins	prod. w/ Nems
2020	"Shootout at the Cyclone"	Ill Bill, Nems, Lord Goat	Gorilla Twins	N/A
2020	"Illest Killers"	Ill Bill, Tech N9NE	La Bella Medusa	prod. w/ Scott "Supe" Stallone
2020	"Dinner Plate"	Ill Bill, Lord Goat, Recognize Ali, Jay Royale	La Bella Medusa	N/A
2024	"Higher Power"	Ill Bill, Uncle Howie	Billy®	N/A

== Music Videos ==
Solo Videos
Year	Album title	Title	Director	Featured artist
2004	What's Wrong With Bill ?	Chasing The Dragon	N/C	Necro
2008	Ill Bill is the Future Vol. 2	Billion$ In My Mind	Triple Beam Productions	
2008	The Hour of Reprisal	Society Is Brainwashed	Jim Starace	
2008	The Hour of Reprisal	My Uncle	MoreFrames	
2009	The Hour of Reprisal	War Is My Destiny	MoreFrames	Max Cavalera, Q-Unique
2010	Kill Devil Hills	Cult Assassin	MoreFrames	DJ Muggs
2010	Kill Devil Hills	Kill Devil Hills	MoreFrames	DJ Muggs, B-Real, Vinnie Paz
2010	Kill Devil Hills	Ill Bill TV	Tom Vujcic	DJ Muggs
2010	Kill Devil Hills	Illuminati 666	MoreFrames	DJ Muggs
2010	Kill Devil Hills	Millenium of Murders	MoreFrames	DJ Muggs
2012	The Grimy Awards	Severed Heads of State	Ill Bill / NO-FI	El-P
2012	The Grimy Awards	When I Die (O.G. Version)	J.F. Martin / Tom Vujcic	
2013	The Grimy Awards	Exploding Octopus	Sci	
2013	The Grimy Awards	World Premier	Ill Bill / NO-FI	
2013	The Grimy Awards	How To Survive The Apocalypse	Sci	
2013	The Grimy Awards	Paul Baloff	MoreFrames	
2013	The Grimy Awards	Vio-Lence	Aaron Vasquez / Pace Rivers	DJ Skizz, Lil' Fame, Shabazz the Disciple
2013	The Grimy Awards	Acid Reflux	J.F. Martin / Tom Vujcic	
2016	Septagram	Manson vs. Berkowitz	Kevin Desjardin	Q-Unique
2016	Septagram	Make Them Die Slowly	Tom Vujcic	
2019	Cannibal Hulk	Hulk Meat	Jimmy Johansson	Stu Bangas, Goretex
2019	Cannibal Hulk	Cannibal Hulk	Ezru	Stu Bangas
2019	Cannibal Hulk	World War Hulk	Tom Vujcic	Stu Bangas, Goretex, Slaine
2019	Pulp Phixion	Warlord	Tom Vujcic	Sunday, D.V. Alias Khryst
2019	Pulp Phixion	Debbie Abono	Jimmy Johansson	Sunday, Vinnie Paz
2019	Pulp Phixion	Axe of Abraxas	NEKTR	Sunday, Lord Goat (Goretex), Sick Jacken
2020	La Bella Medusa	What's my Drug?	Jimmy Johansson	D.V. Alias Khryst
2020	La Bella Medusa	Be Afraid !	Sun Bronx	Conway the Machine, Pharoahe Monch
2020	Kill Devil Hills	Skull & Guns	Juan Richard Felix	Slaine, Everlast
2021	The Grimy Awards	L'Amour East (7 minutes of ecstacy)	Jimmy Johansson	Q-Unique, Flatbush Zombies, Meyhem Lauren
2022	Billy	Once upon a Time in Canarsie	Jimmy Johansson	Lord Goat
2022	Billy	Leviathan	Jimmy Johansson	Tragedy Khadafi
2022	Billy	Time To Go	Jimmy Johansson	
2022	Billy	Smarten Up	Hausriot Studios	Nems
2022	Billy	Root for the Villain	Hausriot Studios	Kool G Rap, Vinnie Paz, DJ Muggs
2023	Billy	Hell Awaits	Jimmy Johansson	
2024	Billy	Alpha Futura	Tom Vujcic	

Non-solo Videos
Year	Artist(s)	Title	Director	Other featured artists
2002	Non Phixion	Rock Stars	N/C	
2004	Non Phixion	14 Years of Rap	N/C	The Arsonists
2004	Necro	White Slavery	N/C	
2004	Mr Hyde	The Crazies	N/C	Necro, Goretex
2008	Jedi Mind Tricks	Heavy Metal Kings	N/C	
2008	Mr. Hyde	Killer Collage	Necro	Q-Unique, DJ Eclipse
2008	La Coka Nostra	That's Coke	Danny Boy	
2009	La Coka Nostra	I'm An American	N/C	B-Real
2009	La Coka Nostra	Cousin of Death	Frank Sacramento	
2011	William Cooper	Beware of the Pale Horse	Sci	
2012	La Coka Nostra	Mind Your Business	J.F. Martin/Tom Vujcic	
2012	La Coka Nostra	Creed Of The Greedier	Tom Vujcic	
2012	La Coka Nostra	Letter To Ouisch	Danny Boy	
2012	Diggaz With Attitude	The Realest	R.M.L.	Slaine
2013	Reel Wolf	The Underworld	Tom Vujcic	Apathy, Bizarre, Celph Titled, PMD, Sean Strange, King Gordy, Reef the Lost Cauze, Sid, Slaine, Swifty Mcvay, Tech N9ne, Vinnie Paz
2013	Q-Unique	Listen To The Words	NO/FI	
2014	Snowgoons	Van Gogh / Fernsehshow	SirQLate	Morlockk Dilemma
2014	Loki	Out Of My Mind	Jon Tamkin	Sick Jacken, Jaysaun
2014	Dubie	Lights Out	N/C	Big Left, Tekktron
2014	Reel Wolf	Walk Away (Remix)	N/C	Ironic, So Sick Social Club
2015	Briggs	Eye For An Eye	S.Williamson	
2015	La Coka Nostra	Dark Day Road	Bernard Rose	
2016	La Coka Nostra	Waging War	Tom Vujcic	Rite Hook
2016	Reel Wolf	Anthology	Tom Vujcic	Bizarre, Sean Strange, Mersinary
2016	Reel Wolf	The Underworld 2	Tom Vujcic	Havoc, Kid Fade, Johnny Richter, Slaine, Kool G Rap, Chino XL, Necro, Ruste Juxx, Kuniva, Sabac Red, Sean Price
2017	Heavy Metal Kings	Mercyful Fate	Jimmy Johansson	
2017	Heavy Metal Kings	Gemini Lounge	Jimmy Johansson	Goretex
2017	Heavy Metal Kings	Bad Hombres	Jimmy Giambrone	Goretex
2018	Snowgoons	Killaz Supreme	Gigo Flow & DJ Illegal	Ghostface Killah, Aspects, Sick Jacken
2019	Adlib	Destro	@Skrewtape84	
2019	Q-Unique	Cult Leader & Capital	Ezru	
2019	Klee MaGoR	Rap Titans	Raed Al Murish	Ruste Juxx, Psycho Les, Big Stretch
2019	Slaine	Still Got My Gun	Jimmy Johansson	Vinnie Paz, Rite Hook
2020	Gorilla Twins	Adios	Jimmy Johansson	Immortal Technique, D.V. Alias Khryst
2020	Gorilla Twins	Highs & Lows	Jimmy Johansson	
2020	Gorilla Twins	Bong!	Jimmy Johansson	
2021	Slaine	When The War Ends	Slaine	
2021	Nems	Tha Boro	New Vegas Films	Eddie Kaine, Rim
2021	Astro Vandalist	Violence & Lyricism	Tydroelite	D.V. Alias Khryst, DJ Eclipse
2021	DosTress	I Got Something to Say	Margarita Blazheva	Snaketooth
2021	Redd Rebel and Lord Willin	Russian Hats	n/c	
2022	Big Legion	Kill That	@hausriot	Hurox
2023	Benny Holiday	Gangsters & Goblins	Jason Miller & Tom Vujcic	
2023	El Sicario	Fright Night Team	Colmenares Matias Palominos	
2024	Blood Brothers	Outlaw	Jimmy Giambrone	Necro
	Chubs	Burly Bill	Anthony DeRose	
