= Irish hip-hop =

Music genre or scene

Irish hip hop is the response to the hip hop cultural movement that originated in New York City in the 1970s which, at that time, was most popular in the borough of The Bronx. In the 1980s, breakdancing and graffiti were the first elements of hip hop culture to preface the Irish hip hop movement, which had started to emerge in Ireland.

== 1980s to 1990s ==
When hip hop got its foothold in Ireland there were many rap groups around to give it a good start, from the late 1980s after the breakdance era, they included groups like Craic Pipe (1991) The Rathcoole Posse(Colz), Dis is It (Dj Control), Chrome Angels, MC Tyson, Cut Master Jay & the Majestic M.C. (who would later join Jus Like Family), Gun Point, Jus Like Family, Death Squad, ScaryEire, Marxman, Ghost'n'Jay, DJ Troubledsoul & Hidden Identity, plus Fresh beatz Incorporated from Belfast. All produced tracks and some did live shows, while they were all the very roots of the emerging scene, not all continued on into the early to mid 1990s to continue production and live shows, the one's that did pursue were Marxman, Scary Éire, Ghost'n'Jay, Jus Like Family, First Kouncil, and Belfast natives DJ Troubledsoul, MC Hidden Identity, and Fresh Beatz Incorporated. In 1991, a group called Duffel (formed at the Ballyfermot Rock School), became Ireland's first hip hop band, consisting of live drums, guitar, keyboards, bass, Turntablist, and M.C. Meanwhile, Also in 1991 in Belfast - DJ Troubledsoul, Hidden Identity & Fresh Beatz Incorporated performed the first Live Hip-Hop Showcase in Northern Ireland at the Errigle Inn.

MC Hidden Identity / MC B Fast

Hidden Identity real name Bennett John aka MC B Fast Was the first MC from Northern Ireland to gain recognition in Great Britain. Winning a competition open to the UK in 1987 he went on to write a jingle for the Red Cold Coca-Cola advertising campaign played on radio stations throughout Europe whilst the rapper was featured in the News of the World and Smash Hits magazine. Recording his album mixtape "Hidden era made clearer" with Simon Milligan (DJ Troubled soul) he quickly gained notoriety as a credible underground artist writing about his experiences and views on the troubles of Ireland. The artist was interviewed by Face magazine in 1989 and featured on several popular TV shows not ail you the BPM Show on Chanel 4, BBC 2's Hypnosis and Sky TV. The rapper also worked live shows with DJ Chris Caul in the 1990s playing venues across Belfast and Glasgow. The multi genre MC also known as MC BFast was a prominent figure on the Irish dance music scene in the 1990s. Bfast also appeared in the documentary Dancing on Narrow Ground, filmed for Dispatches in the late 1990s whilst co-running the largest underground illegal rave in the province. In 2000 B Fast moved to Australia and recorded with the AMEN, and Rogue Traders. MC B Fast was the guest MC on Ministry of Sound's "Two step the album" which was number 1 in the Australian HMV charts for four weeks in 2000 earning him residencies in Melbourne's Revolver and Club UK and live performances on channel V at Kix fest. The MC presented radio shows weekly to a live audience called True Step with James Ash on Melbourne's Kiss FM in 2000.

=== DJ Troubledsoul (now - Bethaniens Dust) ===
Started DJing in 1988. Belfast native. DJ, Label owner (Equilibrium Recordings & The Fear) and club pioneer. 1990 started the First Hip Hop Club in Northern Ireland (Katch22) along with MC B-Fast, DJ Triple Cee ( Chris Caul ) and Sconney from The Belfast City Breakers. 1991 Produced the first Full length Irish Hip-Hop LP entitled 'A Hidden Era Made Clearer' with MC Hidden Identity, bringing a unique perspective on being brought up surrounded by 'The Troubles' of the time (archive audio available from Community Skratch Music). 1992 - 2005 Organised various club nights promoting Hip-Hop culture, such as the legendary Melting Pot nights in Dublin, where he was based from 1995. He also presented a weekly Radio Show on Power FM from 1996 until 2003. In 1998 he was to play at the Kohoutek Festival in Los Angeles, supporting The Roots, Abstract Tribe Unique, and Aceyalone on his Book Of Human language Tour, he settled in Seattle collaborating with Heavens Weapons & B.Boy Genre (later to become Giant Panda). Returned to Dublin in 2000 Starting Equilibrium Recordings (First Hip Hop Specialist Label in Ireland), continuing a new solo practice in improvisational techniques and live performance, also performing as an original member of Heavy Flow and contributing producer for Melodica Deathship and as part of the critically acclaimed Free Jazz Quintet Trouble Penetrator. Migrating to Berlin in 2005, where he was to become a member of the Avante Garde / Experimental Music Collective Zentrale Randlage, living and performing there until 2014, when he returned to Belfast. He has been one of the only Producers from the early era of Irish Hip-Hop to remain prolific in production until this day - performing live, and publishing music consistently under his Bethaniens Dust moniker (ex Epigon A.D:M & one half of Shallowbliss) via All City Records (Dublin), Narcorpses Music (Czech), The Content Label (USA), Dreckzloch44 Records (Berlin), Nohmad Netlabel (Belgium), and more recently Publishing Music on the Portland-based Indie Cassette and Vinyl Imprint IHAA Records (see the'Irish Hip Hop Releases' section below for full details).

=== Scary Éire ===
Scary Éire were pioneers of the hip hop scene in Ireland and the first Irish rap act to be signed to a major label (Island Records). Although the band had little commercial success, they were said to be excellent live and had a large cult following. The group's name is a play on the Irish language word Éire.

The band consisted of two rappers (frontman Rí-Rá and hypeman Mr Browne), and two DJ's (Mek and Dada Sloosh).
D.J. Mek (winner of 5 Irish Disco Mix Club titles) had met Rí-Rá and Dada Sloosh working in Tullamore's pirate radio station Kiss F.M. in 1987. All three were involved in earlier rap groups (DaBadaPak and Noiz.Inc) but joined forces in 1990 and recruited Dublin breakdancer Mr. Browne as hypeman and second vocalist.

In 1991 they recorded their early demos in RadioActiv Studios, Bray, which included a Hip Hop reworking of Linton Kwesi Johnson's protest song "Fite Dem back". The recordings led to a string of notorious gigs in Dublin rock venues such as Fibber Magees (Parnell Street) and Barnstormers (a biker bar on Capel Street). A bidding war began as U.K. and International record companies tried to sign them. The band almost signed with Mo Wax but eventually went with Island Records as it was home to some of their musical heroes.

They recorded a debut album that included contributions from Howie B, Tricky and Cutmaster Swift; but were then dropped by Island Records, who kept the rights to the album but did not release it. The band continued to record and play live, including opening for U2 on their Zooropa tour, and supporting many acts such as Madness, Beastie Boys and House of Pain.
Tommy Boy records featured one of their tracks ("Lost for Words") on the 1993 album Planet Rap.
In 1995 Scary Éire reappeared on London independent label 11 Records and released "Dole Q"/"That's No Good To Me" as a 12" single. The former song is about their various comical encounters on dole day and the latter a rugged, frenzied cypher.

In March 2007, the group released The Scary Era - a collection of archive songs that had been shelved since the early 1990s.

Rí-Rá continues to perform live and has released new material including the "Horses work for donkeys wages" album and several singles. He has also collaborated with Sinéad O'Connor, Tricky, Junior Delgado and Adrian Sherwood.

DJ Mek has remixed tracks for Ian Brown, Sweetie Irie, La Coka Nostra, The Frames, Gemma Fox and Dirty Dubsters. .

=== Marxman ===
Marxman were two Dubliners (MC Hollis Byrne and electronic musician Oisín Lunny) and two British Jamaicans (rapper MC Phrase and scratch mixer DJ Kay One) who brought out the album 33 Revolutions Per Minute on Talkin' Loud in 1993. The album exercised Irish traditional music within a hip hop framework. It featured collaborations with Irish folk music guru Dónal Lunny (father of group member Oisín Lunny), Sinéad O'Connor (who had also worked with McLyte on the track "I Want Your (Hands on Me)"), DJ Premier (who produced "Drifting"), trad group Storm, and several others. They gained notoriety for the track "Sad Affair," which protested against the presence of British troops in Northern Ireland; the track was banned by the BBC and most other UK radio stations for featuring lyrics such as "A six-county state is a bastard state / Why oh why can't we all integrate". This was followed in 1994 by an EP titled The Cynic, which cut down on the traditional influences and included some mellow instrumental tracks influenced by Massive Attack. In 1995 they released the Time Capsule LP on the More Rockers label, which was received without too much fuss. The band called an end to the project in 1995.

Since then the group has branched out to do other work, including introductory music for the Irish television channel Teilifís na Gaeilge, running their Pawnshop label, Oisin Lunny's soundtrack work, and recording under the name Minatone on Howie B's Pussyfoot label.

=== Ghost'n'jay ===
Ghost 'n' Jay were part of the first wave of Irish hip-hop that emerged in the late 1980s. The group formed in Tallaght. Sharing similar musical interests; both were heavily influenced by US legends such as Melle Mel, Rakim and Ultramagnetic MCs as well as UK pioneers The London Posse. They developed their down tempo underground sound with a string of recordings at Radio Activ studios in 1993 which resulted in their first E.P with the critically acclaimed tracks "2 Innocent", "Good n Evil" and "No Irish no Blacks". The lyrical content showed that Ghost wrote powerful stories about political and social injustice. Their live shows reflected the DIY nature of the early hip-hop scene – from small venues around Dublin and then on to Fun City in The Point and a residency with Scary Eire at the legendary Barnstormers And Rock Garden gigs as well as other venue's around the country. The band broke up around 1995 but reformed 2004 and the band were greatly credited by new member Colz(DJ/Producer) in 2004 they began playing live shows again, including opening for Lord Finesse and Rahzel as well as regular performance's' in Eamon Dorans including (rouges reunion Saint Patrick's Day gigs) and the village venues. The long-awaited vinyl outing from one of Ireland's original rap groups – Ghost'n'Jay 'What do yea want' is on 'All City records' released March 17, 2006. This four-track 12 inch includes production from colz, and co production by Mek and Jay also contributions from Ri-Ra (ex-Scary Eire) Mr Brown (ex-Scary Eire) and Exile Eye (Equilibrium Recordings - Ireland) both of whom have already released 12s on All City along with Cork emcee/producer Scooby and Dj Mek who has recently been working with artists as diverse as Ian Brown, Sweetie Irie, and Suggs from madness. The seventh release on the All City label features the title track, "What Do Yea Want" plus instrumental "Straight n Direct" alongside an Exile Eye remix of Straight n Direct and this 12 is a mix of the old to the new with young emcee/producer Scooby adding to His growing rep and the ever superb RI-RA adding his own brand of youthful experience making this a welcome addition to the growing catalogue of recorded Irish hip-hop music.

=== Jus Like Family ===
Jus Like Family, one of the pioneering Irish Hip Hop acts, and hailing form Dublin, formed in early 1992 and consisted of Hypeman Buzzy-Boy Chop, M.C.'s (Kong & Locko AKA The McLoughlin brothers), and two Dj's, Cut Master Jay & Dj Laz-e (formerly of early 80s B-boy crew, Team City Rockers). Jay & Laz-e had been a Hip Hop duo prior to Jus Like Family, creating/recording material as far back as '85/'86. JLF was founded by group frontman Locko, whilst showing a group of teenagers how to write Rap lyrics. Jus Like Family were heavily influenced by acts such as Ultramagnetic MCs, Hijack, The Furious Five, and Public Enemy. J.L.F gigged regularly throughout '92-'94, and even joined Scary Eire & Ghost n Jay at the infamous St Patrick's day jam at Dublin biker bar, Barnstormers (home to the Devils Disciples). By 1995, the group had disbanded, with two members moving to the UK. Dj Laz-e returned to his radio roots and went on to present the legendary Plastic Attack (Old School Hip Hop radio show) for RTÉ Radio for over 18 years, '98 - 2016. Guests and contributors to the programme include Ice-T, Chuck D, Melle Mel, Run Dmc, Grand Master Flash, Afrika Bambaataa, M.C.Globe, music producer Tom Moulton, Dj Supreme, Dj Evil E, Sugarhill Gang, Guru, Jazzy Jeff, Mixmaster Mike (Beastie Boys), Movie Director Charlie Ahern, Art Legend Patti Astor, Tim Dog, Dj Cash Money, Ultramagnetic MCs, Blondie, Egyptian Lover, Dj Cheese (Word of Mouth), etc...

Dj Laz-e is now a radio presenter with RTÉ Gold for Ireland's National Broadcaster.

=== First Kouncil ===
First Kouncil began producing hip hop tracks in 1988. Front men Jay Yorke, Al Doyle and Shane O Ciardhubhain backed by DJ Producer Mal Watson created quiet a storm when they first began, featuring in Hot Press. Influenced by artists such as Gang Starr, EPMD, KRS One and Boogie Down Productions. Music was politically driven voicing their opinion of the situation in Northern Ireland and the state of Irish Politics at the time and also creating tracks for the Hip Hop Club culture. First Kouncil featured on Gerry Ryans RTÉ programmes and have supported US3 who were launching their first album "Cantaloop (Flip Fantasia) at the Tivoli Dublin in 1994, US3 were the first Hip Hop Band signed to Blue Note Records. First Kouncil also ran Friday nights at the Zoo Bar as well as Dublin's upfront hip hop radio show "Kaos" on Sunset 107FM.

== 2000s ==
=== Rap Ireland ===
Rap Ireland first appeared in the mid-2000s as a printed publication covering both Irish Hip-Hop and Hip-Hop culture as a whole within Ireland. Having enjoyed early successes and developing offshoots into Concert events and DJ Schools, Rap Ireland has become established as the most popular urban brand in Ireland. Dedicated to the development and exposure of new Irish artists, Rap Ireland (through the RapIreland.com website) also cover Hip-Hop from around the world, through a staff of over 20 writers.

=== Class A'z ===
Class A'z are an Irish rap super old group from Dublin, members of this group include terawrizt AKA Andy Brady, Redzer and Nu-Centz with regular appearances from Collie, Siyo, Nugget and Rawsoul. They were recently featured on an RTÉ documentary about the current state of Irish Hip-Hop. The RTÉ documentary received widespread criticism.

=== Big Que ===
Aidrean Williams is a Galway born hip-hop artist who is based in England. He goes by the stage name Big Que.

Big Que has released one album called Stupid White Boy and two eps under his independent recording label Madness Records.

Big Que has worked with Case Closed, Murder Mass Records and Demon Logic UNLTD.

=== GMC (aka Garry McCarthy) ===
GMC is a producer and rapper from Co.Cork, who was most active as a recording artist between 2004 and 2013, releasing songs like Not Tonight (reached number 12 in the Irish charts in December 2004), Hip Hop Rebels, Girl on Facebook and Focus. He released two songs for the Cork GAA team with Cork's Red FM under the alias of Davey Sullz, "Give Us Back Sam Maguire" and "Do the Jimmy Barry Murphy". In 2009 he began delivering rap, beats, songwriting and recording workshops for young people around Ireland as GMCBeats Workshops and Song-in-a-Day Workshops. In 2012 he opened the Kabin Studio, in Knocknaheeny Cork City, a youth music space supported by Music Generation Cork City.

=== DJ Wool (aka Glen Brady) ===
Irish hip hop failed to break into the mainstream until the 1998 release of Optic Nerve (EP) by Exile Eye. Third Eye Surfers brought their own sound to Irish hip hop with their critically acclaimed album Filthy Folklore, released in 2001 and produced by DJ Wool (aka Glen Brady). Band members DJ Wool, Lisa Dee, Big Al (previously First Kouncil), Richie C and MC Poetic quickly received recognition on the Irish hip hop scene and followed their album's success with a 12" vinyl titled Third Eye Mindstate, which landed them a Best Newcomer Award at the Smirnoff Dance Awards in the Temple Theatre, Dublin. Touring Ireland, Third Eye Surfers began to build a solid fan base, supporting such names as Public Enemy, Jurassic 5, The Pharcyde and Sugarhill Gang. The band broke up in 2002. DJ Wool is now a founding member of New York-based punk-funk/electronic outfit The Glass and is signed to Stretch Arm Strong's Plant Records. He and The Glass are constantly touring the world and releasing records and remixes by the likes of R.E.M., INXS, Jennifer Lopez, Just Jack, Howie B, Ghostface Killah and Killah Priest. In 2008 DJ Wool engineered and mixed the Billboard Charting Baltimore Club album 12 Steps by Tittsworth, featuring appearances by Kid Sister, DJ Assault, The Federation, Nina Sky and others. His remixes of "Broke Ass N*gga" (featuring DJ Assault) and "WTF" (featuring Santogold and Pase Rock) featured widely on popular music blogs, including Discobelle, The Music Slut, and Brookly Vegan.

=== Messiah J & The Expert ===
Messiah J & The Expert are a rapper/producer duo from Dublin, Ireland, originally part of three-piece Creative Controle with DJ Mayhem. Their first release, the single "First Place", came out in September 2003, quickly followed by their debut album, What's Confusing You? Over the years, they have supported Public Enemy, The Street, Gang Starr, De La Soul, Jurassic 5, Wyclef Jean, Buck 65, The Pharcyde, El-P, Jeru The Damaja and others. In March 2006, they released a 12" single featuring New York rapper C-Rayz Walz, entitled "When The Bull Gores The Matador", on their own label, Inaudible Records. This was followed in September 2006 by the release of "Something Outta Nothing". In October 2006 they released the album Now This I Have To Hear, which was nominated for a Choice Music Prize in January 2007. In October 2008 they released From The Word Go, which was nominated for a Choice Music Prize in January 2009.

=== mo-t ===
Formed in 2004, mo-t consists of emcee Mobriath, producer Pablo and DJ Carnie, all based on the Northside of Dublin. They frequently released material between 2005 and 2017, both as physical and digital releases. The trio performed live at variety of venues across Dublin and its outlying areas. Lyrically, the band is both surreal and confessional. The production displays a wide range of influences as diverse as Radiohead and Eurodance.

=== The Rubberbandits ===
The Rubberbandits are comedy rappers and producers from Limerick who perform anonymously in costume. Having started off making prank phone calls, they ventured into hip hop in 2008. They have supported Ice Cube and Alabama 3. Their track "Bags of Glue" became an underground hit in 2008. Another track, "Up Da Ra" (a satirical song about Irish history) created much controversy on YouTube and MySpace. Nialler 9 of State magazine has listed the Rubberbandits as his number two international act "to watch for 2009." In December 2010 the Rubberbandits released Horse Outside with the target of it becoming the Irish Christmas number one single, it finished second behind X-Factor winner Matt Cardle.

=== The Infomatics ===
The Infomatics are an Irish hip hop musical ensemble from Dublin. They consist of Bugs, BOC, Steo (aka Konchus Lingo) and Mr. Dero. Steo's brother, Damien Gunn, was lead vocalist and saxman with DC Nien, a 1970s band who at one stage rivalled U2.

The Infomatics have released one album titled Kill or Create. They participated in interactive music television series The Raw Sessions in 2009, winning the overall series. Since winning they have been dubbed "the loudest voice in Irish hip hop".[1] They have been awarded the title Sony Ericsson Artist of the Year.

=== Rob Kelly ===
Rob Kelly is a rapper from county Wexford, who was discovered in 2003, and has since become a major figure in the Irish underground hip hop scene. Artists such as the American rapper Slaine, have performed with him on songs, and he has supported live acts from artists such as, the American rapper Game.

=== Tall-Order ===
Paul Tall-Order Ritchie is a rapper Born in Greenfort, Clondalkin. Tall-Order is owner of Ireland's biggest hip hop label Bloodshed Records. He's worked with Kool G Rap, Wu Tang Clan, Immortal Technique, Vinnie Paz, Roc Marciano, Block McCloud, Diabolic, Apathy, Ill Bill and many more. His debut album The Tree of Life and Death is a concept story telling joint being critically acclaimed worldwide from fellow peers and critics. Its driven by real 1990s hip hop lyricism & story telling content. Tall Order is being described by Kool G Rap as the meanest lyricist he's ever came across & Block Mccloud said recently When he gets his flow polished nobody in hip hop is getting close to his raw story telling lyricism. Nas was recently quoted as saying his album is the best concept album he's ever heard, with tracks including 'A Thorne in Roses Side' & 'Life in a Colouring Book' these lyrical bombs about cancer & drug abuse are a must hear. His track titled 'Sobrietys Vines' was critically acclaimed by writers in the uk & Ireland as shocking how he can depict life in rhymes. The Tree of Life & Death including full scale book/magazine also named The Tree of Life & Death was released on December 13 on iTunes and in stores.

=== Sons Phoenetic ===
Sons Phonetic are a Hip Hop group formerly known as Correkt Minds who are dedicated to keeping raw uncut Hip Hop alive. Their style of music can be described as hard-hitting, thought provoking lyricism over heavy sample based beats. Their debut album is entitled Twelve Labours.

=== Bigsnap ===
Bigsnap (Dylan Jackson) is a rapper located in Galway. Known for his rap, videography and has done graphics for many mainstream artist such as Tay Dizm, Bobby Brackins and Steven Jo, co-founder of a rap group known as Big Entertainment. The group consists of Bigsnap (Dylan Jackson) and Lil M (Ryan Doyle). The duo will be releasing their debut album in 2015.

== 2010s ==
In response to grime in the UK and channels such as GRM Daily, Link Up TV and SB.TV, online music platforms have started up such as Irish Rap Movement, *Dearfach TV and New Eire TV.

=== Versatile ===
Versatile are a rap duo from Ringsend,Dublin consisting of Alex "Eskimo Supreme" Sheehan and Casey "Casper" Walsh. Versatile released their first mix tape Dublin City Gs in November 2017. In April 2018 Versatile released their single Ketamine which is to date their most successful song with over 2,900,000 Spotify likes and over 4,000,000 views on YouTube. Since forming in 2013 Versatile have gained over 144,000 followers on Spotify and amassed over 20,000,000 views on YouTube.

=== Mango X MathMan ===
Mango X MathMan are a rap/grime duo consisting of rapper Karl "Mango" Mangan and producer Adam Fogarty both members of rap collective "The Animators". In 2018 they launched their debut EP "Wheel Up" with a track featuring African/Irish rapper Dania. In February 2019 they released single "No Surrender FM".

=== Rejjie Snow ===
Alex Anyaegbunam better known by his stage name Rejjie Snow, is an Irish rapper, songwriter and record producer from Dublin.

=== LDK ===
LDK are a rap group from Grange, County Sligo who after being featured on grime series Risky Roadz went viral with a freestyle video which amassed over 1,700,000 views on YouTube.

=== Shy Son ===
ShySon is an Irish hiphop producer, DJ, rapper and member of the hiphop group "The Body Snatcherz". Shy Has Worked with acts/groups/producers such as DjGreen, A10sin, Drewbious-Prime, Evolution dnb, Romeo butcher, Cuttin heads, Lvls mcr, Chimpo mc, Youngsta, Calibre and Chattyboo productions.

=== Rusangano Family ===
Rusangano Family are a Limerick trio with roots in Togo, Zimbabwe and County Clare, whose debut album Let The Dead Bury The Dead won the 2016 Choice Music Prize.

Jack Rabbit

Jack Rabbit (Jack Masterson) is a Mayo-based rapper, comedian, filmmaker and actor. He has been nominated for a Janice Memorial award for his song "Try To Leave Me". He regularly performs comedy under his real name while releasing music under the "Jack Rabbit" name. As of date he has released two albums and two EPs.

=== Kojaque ===
Kojaque (Kevin Smith) is a Dublin-based rapper, visual artist and filmmaker, whose debut album Deli Daydreams was nominated for the Choice Music Prize.

=== Craic Boi Mental ===
Craic Boi Mental is a Cork-based rapper, who has performed under many aliases, most notably Dudewithswag and Oscar Benso. To date, they have released three albums and 2 EPs.

=== Stylistic Murder ===
Ireland's old school Hip Hop record label, Known for their breakout events including DJ Premier, KRS-One, Hopsin and many more. Stylistic Murder have been relevantly quiet in the Irish Hip Hop world on the music front, founder Gavin Byrne released two EP's exclusively with South Korea's indie label Link6 in 2015 & 2018 respectively before appearing on Sony Music Korea's "The Movement" compilation album. In 2020, Stylistic Murder have turned their attention to Ireland, with upcoming singles alongside some of Hip Hop's biggest names in the pipeline, the label set to be a first of its kind in Ireland and one to watch for 2021.

=== E The Artist ===
E The Artist is a North Dublin-based rapper, political activist and visual artist, who released his debut single Caramel (featuring Northern Irish rapper Leo Miyagee) in early 2020.

== "The Irish Undaground" ==
The Irish Undaground has evolved through various forms, including an eColumn authored by Kounter Kulture that first appeared in 2003, and an extensive album collection of Kounter Kulture's personal songs, collaborations, radio interviews, music videos, a documentary and Ireland's first Top 10 chart show for Irish hip hop, which began on 1 April 2006. On 20 April 2010, the Irish Undaground launched a radio station that plays Irish hip hop all day.

== Irish Hip-Hop releases ==
=== 1991 ===
- DJ Troubledsoul & MC Hidden Identity - A Hidden Era Made Clearer

=== 1993 ===
- Marxman - 33 Revolutions Per Minute
- Ghost'n'Jay - 2 Innocent EP

=== 1994 ===
- Marxman - The Cynic EP

=== 1995 ===
- Scary Éire – Dole Q (12")

=== 1996 ===
- DJ Troubledsoul - Shoebox Perspectivs
- Marxman - Time Capsule

=== 1997 ===
- The Illdependents - EP

=== 1998 ===
- DJ Troubledsoul - Lightweight Weatherproof And Durable
- The Assassin - Lyrical Assassination EP
- Exile Eye - Optic Nerve EP

=== 1999 ===
- DJ Troubledsoul - Balance
- The Illdependents - Back In The System EP

=== 2000 ===
- DJ Troubledsoul & Exile Eye - Super Subversive / Inessence 12" Vinyl
- Rí Rá - 40 Shades Of Greed EP

=== 2001 ===
- Exile Eye & DJ Troubledsoul - Everyday Thing / Forward On 7" Vinyl
- 3rd Eye Surfers - Filthy Folklore
- Rí Rá – Front Bar (12")

=== 2002 ===
- Exile Eye - Pressure Points
- Metabollix - Done & Dusted EP

=== 2003 ===
- Hazo - Trippin Thru Me Dreams (12")
- Messiah J & The Expert - What's Confusing You?
- Relevance – Mushee Peas EP
- Rí Rá - 25 O'Clock In The Morning (12")
- Urban Intelligence - Demo

=== 2004 ===
- Troubledsoul - Ghostwriter E.P 12" Vinyl"
- Mista B - Just A Fraction...
- Rob Kelly - The Kellection
- Urban Intelligence - The Urban Intelligence EP

=== 2005 ===
- DJ Troubledsoul & Junkfood - Formation Komplete
- Big Que - End Of The Line EP
- Collie - Is Ainm Dom
- VA - HomeMade Bombs Mixtape

=== 2006 ===
- B Wonder ft Buachaill Dana - The Shades
- Captain Moonlight - Agroculture pt. 1 (Live From The Farm Shed)
- Dutch Gold Kid - Silence of The Shams
- Ghost and Jay - What Do Ye Want EP
- GMC - Diggin' A Hole
- Messiah J & The Expert - Now This I Have To Hear
- Nu-Centz - Why Be Modest?
- Rawsoul - Here's What I Did Last Summer
- Redzer - Dublife
- Rí Rá – Madd Axxe EP
- Rob Kelly - Bragging Rights

=== 2007 ===
- Captain Moonlight - Agroculture pt. 2 (Return of The Barnstormers)
- Collie - How Things Change
- The Elements - B-Sides
- Maverick Sabre - The Demo
- Nu-Centz - Hardest Working Man
- Rí Rá - Clash-In Riddim (7")
- Rob Steenson - Whats the Story?
- Scary Éire - The Scary Era
- Terawritz - Art Immatain' Life
- Terawritz - Blank Canvas
- VA - The Proof Mixtape

=== 2008 ===
- DJ Troubledsoul & Junkfood - Algorithm Of Shadows
- The Assassin - Lights Cameras Assassin
- Class A'z - The Drink Money Mixtape
- Correkt Minds - Figure of Speech
- The Infomatics - Kill Or Create
- Intox - Rugged Gurrier
- Jonny Boy - The Gospel According To John
- Lineage - From Here And From There
- Rob Steenson - Sense Makes Cents
- Sleepy - Music For Buses (Instrumental)

=== 2009 ===
- Bradshaw- The Karen EP
- Captain Moonlight - Agroculture pt. 3 (On the lough)
- Class A'z - The Drug Money Mixtape
- Danny Diggs - Introducing EP
- Exxon Valdez - The Exxon Valdez Mixtape
- GMC – Fillin’ The Hole EP
- Jonnyboy & Intox - The Propaganda EP
- Lunitic - Based on a True Story
- Maverick Sabre - Speech and Beats EP
- Messiah J & The Expert - From The Word Go
- mo-t - The Twixtape
- Neddy Arkins - The Boy In The Sky
- Nifty Skillz - 16 Years (And A Bit) In The Makin
- Nu-Centz - Hardest Working Man Vol. 2
- Nu-Centz & Terawritz - Sense The Terror
- Nugget - The Nugget You Love To Hate
- Ol' Dirty Chancer - Don't Dwell On It
- Rí Rá – Horses Work For Donkeys Wages
- Rob Kelly - St Patrick's Day Massacre
- Roysta - Thundercock
- Siyo - Fresh Out The Gaf Vol. 1
- VA - Dread Room: Heard and Unheard

=== 2010 ===
- Epigon A.D:M - Trash Majesty, Epitaph Of DJ Troubledsoul
- Epigon A.D:M & Bulldose - The Key Unknowns
- Epigon A.D:M - Perigone Shell E.P
- Dexter - Project 2501
- Dynamic Grammar - The Grip Tape
- Genesis - Outsiders Perspective
- GMC – Shiny Filth
- Kounter Kulture - H2Eire
- Lethal Dialect - LD50
- Nifty Skillz - This Is Me EP
- Nu-Centz & Rawsoul - Hot Property
- Siyo - Weapons of Mass Creation
- Spekulativ Fiktion - Living Proof That The Pen Is Mightier Than The Sword
- Street Literature - Products of Our Envoirnment
- Terawrizt - Written In Stone

=== 2011 ===
- Epigon A.D:M - Atemübung
- Epigon A.D:M - The Volume Of Things Falling From Notice
- Shallowbliss ( Epigon A.D:M & Seaz 420) - Aisling
- Epigon A.D:M & Son Of A Bricklayer - Delias Suite
- Allee - Game Time
- Ath Cliath Records - Dawn Till Dusk
- Big Que - The Room EP
- Class A'z - The On Tick Mixtape
- Collie Collins - The Aul' Sod
- Collie Collins & Monto - Keep Her Lit EP
- Genesis - Technical Simplicity
- Gerard i2 - What I Like and Love
- Jun Tzu - Belfast Baby
- mo-t - From the 9the Pain
- Noize Thievery - Beyond The Interface Vol. 1
- Nu-centz & Terawrizt - Sense The Terror 2
- Rawsoul - Ready To Diet
- Nugget - The Raw Deal
- Rob Steenson - First Up, Best Dressed
- The Rubberbandits – Serious About Men
- SertOne – The View From Above
- Sketch Nine - The Expenses of Living Free
- Sons Phonetic - Twelve Labours
- Spekulativ Fiktion - mother earth/other earth (Instrumental)
- Terawrizt & Tony Mahoney - Revisited
- VA - DFI Vol. 1
- VA - DFI Vol. 2

=== 2012 ===
- Bethaniens Dust - Once You Hear Yourself Run
- Bethaniens Dust - Ruins
- Shallowbliss - Shallowbliss
- Tall-Order - Depths Of Despair ft Kool G Rap
- Costello - Illosophical
- CmX aka Mexy - Split Mode Vol 1
- Deviant - Lookin Fancy In The Pantry
- Deviant & Spekulativ Fiktion - 48
- Dusty Residents - Seabury Heights
- The Elements - The Lost Archives: 2006 to 2008
- The Expert - Neckbreakers (Beat Tape)
- Flying Buttresses - Orson Welles EP
- Gerard i2 - Out On The...
- G.I & Costello - Underworld
- Good Vibe Society - Have A Good Weekend
- Jambo - Intervention
- Jee4ce - Gingers Have Souls
- Jee4ce - NOW: That's What I Call Jee4ce 2012
- Lethal Dialect - LD50 pt. 2
- MCSneaks - "Do You Need A Lift?"
- Monto - Best Boy EP
- Moschops - Prophecy
- mynameisjOhn - The Focusing Effect
- Naive Ted - Swoon & Doom
- Noize Thievery - More Soul Than A Sock Wit' A Hole (Instrumental Album)
- RíRá - Demo Straights : Unreleased & Underplayed
- Seaz420 - Sewer Rats
- SertOne – Shapes In The Sky EP
- Siyo - The Real Simon Young
- Sketch Nine - Darwin
- J.O.E. Belfast- Tragedy & Hope
- Temper-Mental MissElayneous - Proletarian Restitution EP
- Terawritz - Silence Is Consent
- Terawritz - Reign of Tera

=== 2013 ===
- Tall-Order - One Life ft Killah Priest, Rhyme Asylum, AOTP, Caxton Press, Kool G Rap, Lowkey
- Deanie - Champion (Debut Single)
- Allee - Game Time II
- Class A'z & Funzo - Twenty 13
- J.O.E. Belfast - Trapped In The 90s
- "The Animators - Sketch EP"
- Rew - Hurt Myself
- G.I & Costello - Black Tuna (instrumental album)
- Rob Steenson - Throwin' Rocks EP
- Temper-Mental MissElayneous - Big Words
- Collie ft. Funzo - No Matter What You Do (single)
- Tall-Order - The Tree of Life and Death
- "Diatribe and the Crimson Underground - Information Age"
- Cyril - The squirrel is under the table, Ram it up my arse!
- "The Animators - Drawn Together"
- Icarus Rising - Lucky Seven"
- "Class A'z - Trinity"
- "G.I & Costello - Mary Jane"
- "DJ Moschops & Costello - CosMos"
- "GI & Costello - Bobby Tuna Diares"
- J.O.E. Belfast - The Architect
- "4Real - Armageddon"

=== 2014 ===
- Shallowbliss - Teeth
- Tall-Order & Rew ft Terri Grey - You Know How I Shine
- Ricishade - Keep it lit
- Inception ft Tall-Order, RV,5TH Element,4real & G.I - The Aftermath
- Funzo - The Great Lonesome
- Noco - Isolation (instrumental album)
- Cool Breeze - The Cold As Ice Mixtape
- Lethal Dialect - 1988
- Veritaz - Genesis
- Collie Collins - "The Bitter Truth
- This That & The Other - This That & The Other EP
- dsgrace - Adoxography (produced by Noize Thievery)

=== 2015 ===
- Craic Boi Mental - Space Magic
- Noco - Open Minds EP (instrumental album)
- Jambo - Die or Develop
- Harland & Wolff Pack- Redrum
- "Damaged" - Shane Deane

=== 2016 ===
- Craic Boi Mental - Sleepwave
- Bethaniens Dust & Tenshun - Archaic / Symmetry
- Weenz - Selling You My Sins
- "Original" - Shane Deane
- Same D4ence - Exclamation Marks!

=== 2017 ===
- Bethaniens Dust - Three Muses
- Bethaniens Dust - Gauze
- Bethaniens Dust - Stasis
- Big Que - Stupid White Boy
- Hyfin - I aint
- "Dublin City G's" - Versatile
- "Arrogant EP" - Rogan
- "The Winter Warm-up - EP" - Tommy-G
- "The Winter Warm-up II: There Will Be No Miracles Here - EP" - Tommy-G
- "Visions Of Immortality" - Tommy G
- "Society Of Secrets EP" - MC Kenna
- J.O.E. Belfast - Day/Night
- "Rich In Faith" - D'AZ
- Jambo - Trapped
- Take Your Lickin's - DBMCs

=== 2018 ===
- Bethaniens Dust - Now Freedom Music
- Big Que - The Darkness Is Where I Came From
- Hyfin - Don't Really Talk (IRISH TRAP/RAP/DRILL)
- Phree Degrees - E.M.L.E
- INK- DUCK "N" DIVE (IRISH DRILL MUSIC)
- Intox - From The Ashes EP
- INK- Auto crops - (IRISH DRILL MUSIC)
- J.O.E. Belfast - The Living Dead
- Jack Rabbit - Self Titled
- "Brewed In The Hills" - Shane Deane
- "minnesota." - Phree Degrees
- "Ketamine" - Versatile
- "How's Things" - Mc Downy
- "No Mercy" - Mc Skinny
- "Mc Downy Remastered" - Mc Downy
- "The Birds and The E's" - Mc Skinny
- "Purfume" - Versatile
- "Sustenance" - Shane Deane
- "Punchy Gang" - Punchy
- "Eoin Skegs McCormick- Rian took my nodge"
- "Eye for an Eye" - Finn Human
- Alex Gough - Afraidofmoney
- JyellowL - ME N ME TOO
- Twos - Jay Suttin

=== 2019 ===
- Bethaniens Dust - Dualism
- Bethaniens Dust & Tenshun - Pondering / Desolation
- Big Que - The Madness Is Out
- Craic Boi Mental - Cork City Anthems
- Craic Boi Mental - Diaries Of A Squickhead
- Hazey Haze - The Drug EP
- Citrus Fresh - Early Days/Late Nights
- Hyfin "IG" (IRISH TRAP/DRILL/RAP)
- INK - Eye for an Eye
- Wat Dju Mean - Mc Downy
- J.O.E. BELFAST - R KID
- Kneecap - H.O.O.D
- Alex Gough - 80%
- Versey - Ballybrack : The Album
- Versatile Ft. Coolio - Escape Wagon
- Reggie Ft Chuks - Heist (IRISH DRILL MUSIC)
- Lovemedante - Cold
- Sam Grainger - TRUST
- Keep On - Daz
- Rum & Raspberry - Jay Suttin
- Chapter One - Skeet

=== 2020 ===
- TC/XL - DA BOLLIX
- Hazey Haze - Is Mise
- Velli Valentino - Nollywood
- L.Z Ft Velli Valentino - LMK Prince
- Slick Bullet Ft Panch - Kilos
- Craic Boi Mental - Craickaveli
- Flynn Johnson - Pray
- Rablo Luccii - Blo Baby
- Dubzeno x Slick Bullet - You Know
- Travis Okonma FT Sean X - Cologne
- Jack Rabbit - Tears Of A Clown
- Intox - Pyrokinesis
- Alan Newman - Al-Go-Rhythm
- Valkryie - Pull Up
- Palindrome - Steve Loc
- Mac10zen - Levels + Good things
- E The Artist x Leo Miyagee - Caramel
