= Solitary confinement (disambiguation) =

Solitary confinement is a punishment or special form of imprisonment in which a prisoner is denied contact with any other persons.

Solitary Confinement may also refer to:

Albums

- Solitary Confinement (Leæther Strip album), 1992
- Solitary Confinement (Rhyme Asylum album), 2010

Songs

- "Solitary Confinement", a punk single released by The Members in 1979
