= Class A'z =

Irish rap collective

- Origin: Dublin, Ireland
- Genres: Hip hop
- Years active: 2005–present
- Members: Redzer; Terawrizt
- Past members: Rawsoul; Nucentz; Collie
- Website: shop.terawrizt.com

Class A'z are an Irish rap collective, whose members include the artists Terawrizt and Redzer. Former members of the group include Nucentz, Rawsoul and Collie. Irish Hip Hop artists Nugget, Siyo, Jonny Darko, Rob Steenson and Rob Kelly are closely affiliated. Class A'z are considered leading figures on Ireland's underground hip hop scene, having produced a back catalogue of songs and videos which have brought them a considerable internet following, but as yet no real commercial success. They have a long running feud with rival Irish rap group "Working Class Army", a feud which featured on a documentary by Irish television channel RTÉ, which also followed their career. They released 3 mixtapes to date, The Drink Money Mixtape, The Drug Money Mixtape, and On Tick.

== Redzer ==
Redzer (real name Kieron Ryan, born 1984, Coolock, North Dublin) is well known on the Irish hip hop scene and released his first album Dublife in 2006. He has released two mixtapes and numerous videos with the group and also ran Don't Flop Ireland, the Irish rap battle league, which he is also responsible for bringing over to Ireland from the UK in 2006.

== Illderberg ==
Illderberg is a collective made up of Class A'z members Redzer and Terawrizt, as well as rappers Rob Kelly and Jonny Darko. The group first came to the public's eye on Rob Kelly's "Black Irish Rogue" album, on the song "The Four Horseman" which was produced by frequent collaborator Anarkist. The music video for "The Four Horsemen" gathered much attention for the collective as it has appeared on MTV in the U.S. (making them one of the first Irish hip hop acts to do so) as well as other stations in the U.S. The group has also appeared on Class A'z "Home Invasion" album featuring on several songs. It is unknown if the group will be releasing a project under the name.

== Discography ==
=== Class A'z ===
- The Drink Money (Mixtape)
- The Drug Money (Mixtape)
- On Tick (Mixtape)
- Twenty 13 (Studio Album)
- Trinity EP (w/ Robyn Kavanagh)

=== Redzer ===
- Dublife (studio album) [2006]

=== Terawrizt ===
- Art Immatatin' Life (studio album) [2007]
- Reign of Tera(studio album) [2012]
- Silence is Consent (studio album) [2012]
- 33 (w/ Tony Mahoney) (studio album) [2017]
