= A Brand You Can Trust =

Studio album by La Coka Nostra
- Released: July 14, 2009
- Recorded: 2006–2009
- Genre: Hardcore hip hop
- Length: 57:45
- Labels: Uncle Howie; Suburban Noize
- Producers: Daddy X (exec.); Cynic; DJ Lethal; Everlast; Ill Bill; Q-Unique; Sicknature; The Alchemist

La Coka Nostra chronology
A Brand You Can Trust (2009)	Masters of the Dark Arts (2012)

A Brand You Can Trust is the debut studio album by American hardcore hip hop supergroup La Coka Nostra. It was released on July 14, 2009, via Uncle Howie/Suburban Noize Records. Production was handled by members DJ Lethal, Everlast and Ill Bill, together with Cynic, Q-Unique, Sicknature and The Alchemist. It features guest appearances from Sick Jacken, B-Real, Bun B, Immortal Technique, Q-Unique, Sen Dog and Snoop Dogg, as well as the group's former member Big Left.

In the United States, the album debuted at number 84 on the US Billboard 200, number 43 on the Top R&B/Hip-Hop Albums and number 21 on the Top Internet Albums. It also made it to number 44 on the Swiss Hitparade.

== Background ==
The album took over three years to make, due to solo projects from Everlast, Slaine and Ill Bill. It was originally set for release on September 11, 2007, alongside Ill Bill's The Hour of Reprisal album, before both were pushed back.

In late 2008 the group, with the help of former Non Phixion's DJ Eclipse and Cypress Hill members Sen Dog and DJ Muggs, signed with West Coast hip hop/punk rock independent record label Suburban Noize Records.

The album was recorded and mixed at DJ Lethal's studio and at the Soul Assassins Studio in Los Angeles, with additional mixing done in Brooklyn at Ill Bill's Cult Leader Media in-home studio.

"Fuck Tony Montana" first appeared on the Ill Bill mixtape Ill Bill Is The Future Vol. 2: I'm a Goon!, released on December 5, 2006. "That's Coke" was remixed for the album due to sample clearance issues of the original version, which used portions from Bobby Byrd's "I'm Not To Blame".

== Critical reception ==
Professional ratings
Review scores
Source	Rating
AllMusic	4/5 stars
HipHopDX	3.5/5
laut.de	3/5 stars
RapReviews	7/10

AllMusic's Alex Henderson found the album "more concerned with having some raucous fun than it is with trying to save the world -- although that sociopolitical element is still an attractive side dish", concluding "A Brand You Can Trust is one all-star album that doesn't disappoint". Andrew Kameka of HipHopDX wrote that "the album is a mostly solid effort and exactly what someone would expect from a supergroup of like-minded members known for high-energy music". Steve Juon of RapReviews found "the concept is enjoyable though, the beats are largely on point, and the cameos give the concept of being angry simply for anger's sake a well-needed break".

Adam Kennedy of the BBC while praising some the moments of the album said "it's a tantalising parting taste of potential capabilities, yet until they improve a customer satisfaction hit rate that barely troubles one in three tunes here". Neil Acharya of Exclaim! wrote: "this album is not for those wishing to hear something in the same vein as House of Pain, nor is it for anyone who thought they might find something that sounded remotely like Cypress Hill". Another Exclaim! reviewer Thomas Quinlan said "La Coka Nostra are an interesting collection of collaborators that live up to the hype". Gavin Haynes of NME wrote: "the beats are 1991-chunky, Everlast sounds like Chris Rea when he croons, and on the likes of 'I'm An American' they tackle social issues with all the subtlety of a 600ft-high penis".

== Track listing ==
No.	Title	Writer(s)	Producer(s)	Length
1.	"Bloody Sunday" (featuring Big Left and Sen Dog)	Erik Schrody; William Braunstein; John Faster; George Carroll; Leor Dimant	DJ Lethal	3:12
2.	"Get You By"	Carroll; Schrody; Braunstein; Dimant	DJ Lethal	4:01
3.	"Bang Bang" (featuring Snoop Dogg)	Braunstein; Schrody; Carroll; Faster; Dimant	DJ Lethal	3:30
4.	"The Stain"	Braunstein; Carroll; Schrody	Everlast	5:21
5.	"I'm an American" (featuring B-Real)	Carroll; Braunstein; Schrody; Louis Freese; Dimant	DJ Lethal; Sicknature	3:59
6.	"Brujeria" (featuring Sick Jacken)	Braunstein; Jack Gonzalez; Carroll; Schrody; Dimant	DJ Lethal	2:41
7.	"Once Upon a Time"	Schrody; Braunstein; Carroll; Dimant	DJ Lethal	3:19
8.	"Cousin of Death"	Carroll; Braunstein; Schrody	Ill Bill; DJ Lethal	4:18
9.	"Choose Your Side" (featuring Bun B)	Bernard Freeman; Schrody; Braunstein; Alan Maman	Alchemist	4:22
10.	"Hardcore Chemical"	Braunstein; Schrody; Carroll; Dimant	DJ Lethal	3:23
11.	"Soldier's Story" (featuring Sick Jacken)	Braunstein; Gonzalez; Carroll; Schrody; Dimant	DJ Lethal	3:50
12.	"Gun in Your Mouth"	Carroll; Schrody; Braunstein; Richard Alfaro	Cynic	3:39
13.	"Nuclear Medicinemen" (featuring Q-Unique and Immortal Technique)	Carroll; Schrody; Felipe Coronel; Anthony Quiles; Braunstein	Q-Unique	4:38
14.	"That's Coke"	Schrody; Carroll; Braunstein; Daniel O'Connor; Dimant	DJ Lethal	3:09
15.	"Fuck Tony Montana" (featuring Sick Jacken and B-Real)	Braunstein; Schrody; Gonzalez; Freese; Carroll; Dimant	DJ Lethal	4:23
Total length:				57:45

== Personnel ==
La Coka Nostra

- Erik "Everlast" Schrody – vocals, producer (track 4)
- William "Ill Bill" Braunstein – vocals, producer (track 8)
- George "Slaine" Carroll – vocals (tracks: 1–8, 10–15)
- Daniel "Danny Boy" O'Connor – vocals (tracks: 2, 10, 14), executive producer, art direction, design, photography
- John "Big Left" Faster – vocals (track 1)
- Leor "DJ Lethal" Dimant – scratching (tracks: 3, 5, 14), producer (tracks: 1–3, 5–8, 10, 11, 14, 15)

Guest musicians

- Senen "Sen Dog" Reyes – vocals (track 1)
- Calvin "Snoop Dogg" Broadus – vocals (track 3)
- Louis "B-Real" Freese – vocals (tracks: 5, 15)
- Jack "Sick Jacken" Gonzalez – vocals (tracks: 6, 11, 15)
- Bernard "Bun B" Freeman – vocals (track 9)
- Felipe "Immortal Technique" Coronel – vocals (track 13)
- Anthony "Q-Unique" Quiles – vocals & producer (track 13)
- Grisha Dimant – guitar (track 1)
- Erick "Baby Jesus" Coomes – bass guitar (track 2)
- Russell Ali – additional guitar (track 2)

Technicals

- Jeppe "Sicknature" Andersen – producer (track 5)
- Alan "The Alchemist" Maman – producer (track 9)
- Richard "Cynic" Alfaro – producer (track 12)
- Brad "Daddy X" Xavier – executive producer
- Kevin Zinger – executive producer
- Dez Einswell – art direction, design
- Casey Quintal – design, layout
- Mike D. – photography
- Leslie Frank – legal
- Peter Paterno – legal
- Eric "DJ Eclipse" Winn – management
- Arlene Katz – management
- Peter Schwartz – booking
- Tim Borror – booking

== Charts ==
Chart (2009)	Peak position
Swiss Albums (Schweizer Hitparade)	44
US Billboard 200	84
US Top R&B/Hip-Hop Albums (Billboard)	43
