= Masters of the Dark Arts =

Studio album by La Coka Nostra
- Released: July 31, 2012
- Genre: Hip hop
- Length: 50:16
- Label: Fat Beats Records
- Producer: Beat Butcha; C-Lance; DJ Lethal; DJ Premier; Ill Bill; Jack Of All Trades; Scott "Supe" Stallone; Sicknature; Statik Selektah

La Coka Nostra chronology
A Brand You Can Trust (2009)	Masters of the Dark Arts (2012)	To Thine Own Self Be True (2016)

Masters of the Dark Arts is the second studio album by American hip hop supergroup La Coka Nostra. It was released on July 31, 2012, via Fat Beats Records. Production was handled by members DJ Lethal and Ill Bill, as well as C-Lance, Sicknature, Beat Butcha, DJ Premier, Jack Of All Trades, Scott "Supe" Stallone and Statik Selektah. It features guest appearances from Vinnie Paz, Sean Price, Sick Jacken, Thirstin Howl III and Big Left.

Member Everlast left the group in order to attend to his daughter's medical issues.

== Critical reception ==
Professional ratings
Review scores
Source	Rating
HipHopDX	3.5/5
XXL	4/5 (XL)

Adam Fleischer of XXL magazine noted that "La Coka Nostra remain decidedly true to their core with their new album" and "that they are indeed masters of the dark arts". Justin Hunte of HipHopDX gave the album a positive review and noted that the album was a "sinister, happily violent detour from the pop-centric". Peter Marrack of Exclaim! also gave the album a positive review and noted that the album was "more or less a one-way ticket to hell". Nathan G. O'Brien of Scene Point Blank gave it four out five star and said "with Master of the Dark Arts La Coka Nostra’s pluperfect union of bombastic boom-bap, record scratching, and realism-based hardcore rhyming".

== Track listing ==
No.	Title	Writer(s)	Producer(s)	Length
1.	"My Universe" (featuring Vinnie Paz)	William Braunstein; George Carroll; Vincenzo Luvineri; Patrick Baril	Statik Selektah	4:00
2.	"Creed of the Greedier"	Braunstein; Carroll; Daniel O'Connor; Jeppe Andersen	Sicknature	3:43
3.	"המוסד"	Braunstein; Carroll; Leor Dimant; Scott Stalone	DJ Lethal; Scott "Supe" Stallone	3:16
4.	"Mind Your Business"	Braunstein; Carroll; Christopher Edward Martin	DJ Premier	4:35
5.	"Electronic Funeral" (featuring Sean Price)	Braunstein; Carroll; Sean Price; Eliot Dubock	Beat Butcha	3:33
6.	"The Story Goes On"	Braunstein; Carroll; Dimant	DJ Lethal	3:34
7.	"Letter to Ouisch"	Braunstein; Dimant	Ill Bill; DJ Lethal	2:37
8.	"Snow Beach" (featuring Thirstin Howl the 3rd)	Braunstein; Carroll; Victor DeJesus; Jim Heffernan	Jack Of All Trades	4:01
9.	"The Eyes of Santa Muerte" (featuring Sick Jacken)	Braunstein; Carroll; Joaquin Gonzalez	Ill Bill	4:31
10.	"Murder World"	Braunstein; Carroll; Craig Lanciani	C-Lance	2:45
11.	"Coka Kings" (featuring Vinnie Paz)	Braunstein; Carroll; Luvineri; Lanciani	C-Lance	3:48
12.	".38 Револьвер" (featuring Big Left)	Braunstein; Carroll; John Faster; Andersen	Sicknature	3:59
13.	"Malverde Market"	Braunstein; Carroll	Ill Bill	3:11
14.	"Masters of the Dark Arts"	Braunstein; Carroll; Dimant	DJ Lethal	2:43
Total length:				50:16

iTunes edition bonus tracks
No.	Title	Producer(s)	Length
15.	"Everybody Down" (featuring Jaysaun and Q-Unique)	C-Lance	3:34
16.	"No Hay Tiempo Para Mañana" (featuring OuterSpace)	C-Lance	3:03

== Personnel ==
- William "Ill Bill" Braunstein – vocals, producer (tracks: 7, 9, 13)
- George "Slaine" Carroll – vocals
- Leor "DJ Lethal" Dimant – producer (tracks: 3, 6, 7, 14)
- Daniel "Danny Boy" O'Connor – art direction, design
- Vincenzo "Vinnie Paz" Luvineri – vocals (tracks: 1, 11)
- Sean Price – vocals (track 5)
- Victor "Thirstin Howl III" DeJesus – vocals (track 8)
- Joaquin "Sick Jacken" Gonzalez – vocals (track 9)
- John "Big Left" Faster – vocals (track 12)
- Jason "Jaysaun" Rosenwald – vocals (track 15)
- Anthony "Q-Unique" Quiles – vocals (track 15)
- Mario "Planetary" Collazo – vocals (track 16)
- Marcus "Crypt the Warchild" Albaladejo – vocals (track 16)
- Eric "DJ Eclipse" Winn – scratches (tracks: 2, 6, 11, 14), management
- Patrick "Statik Selektah" Baril – scratches & producer (track 1)
- Jeppe "Sicknature" Andersen – producer (tracks: 2, 12)
- Scott "Supe" Stallone – producer (track 3), mixing (tracks: 2, 3, 5–14)
- Christopher "DJ Premier" Martin – scratches & producer (track 4)
- Eliot "Beat Butcha" Dubock – producer (track 5)
- Jim "Jack of All Trades" Heffernan – producer (track 8)
- Craig "C-Lance" Lanciani – producer (tracks: 10, 11, 15, 16)
- Peter Humphreys – mastering
- Zach Shuta – cover art
- Mike McRath – back cover
- Donna McLeer – layout

== Charts ==
Chart (2012)	Peak position
Swiss Albums (Schweizer Hitparade)	21
US Top Current Albums (Billboard)	176
US Independent Albums (Billboard)	40
US Top R&B/Hip-Hop Albums (Billboard)	31
