= As the World Burns =

Studio album by Arsonists
- Released: August 24, 1999
- Studios: Gallco Enterprises; D&D Studios (New York, New York); Ozone Studios (New York, New York); The Fire Place
- Genre: Hip-hop
- Length: 60:51
- Label: Matador
- Producers: Q-Unique; Freestyle; MC D-Stroy; Swel Boogie; DJ Spin One

Arsonists chronology
As the World Burns (1999)	Date of Birth (2001)

Singles from As the World Burns
- 1. "Session" Released: 1996; 2. "Venom / Seed" Released: 1997; 3. "Blaze / Geembo's Theme / Flashback" Released: January 19, 1998; 4. "Backdraft" Released: January 12, 1999; 5. "Pyromaniax" Released: July 5, 1999

As the World Burns is the debut studio album by American hip-hop group Arsonists. It was released on August 24, 1999, via Matador Records. The recording sessions took place at Gallco Enterprises, D&D Studios, Ozone Studios in New York, and The Fire Place. The album was produced by members Q-Unique, Freestyle, MC D-Stroy and Swel Boogie, except one song produced with DJ Spin One. The album peaked at number 78 on the US Billboard Top R&B/Hip-Hop Albums chart. Its single "Pyromaniax" peaked at number 43 on the US Billboard Hot Rap Songs chart.

== Critical reception ==
Professional ratings
Review scores
Source	Rating
AllMusic	4/5 stars
The A.V. Club	favorable
Christgau's Consumer Guide	(neither)
Exclaim!	mixed
NME	4/5 stars
Pitchfork	7.7/10
The Source	3.5/5 stars
Vibe	favorable

Jordan N. Mamone of CMJ New Music Report said: "The mood and the beats can get a little outlandish, but generally, the minor-key strings and time-capsule scratches admirably push hip-hop into the future while taking cues from its past".

In 2015, Fact placed it at number 72 on the "100 Best Indie Hip-Hop Records of All Time" list.

== Track listing ==
No.	Title	Writer(s)	Producer(s)	Length
1.	"Intro"	Anthony Quiles; Eric Winn	Q-Unique	1:37
2.	"Backdraft"	Quiles; Robert Wallace; Geraldo Barreto; David Melendez; Swel Boogie	Freestyle; D.J. Spin One	3:11
3.	"Shit Ain't Sweet"	Quiles; Barreto; Melendez	Freestyle	4:03
4.	"Pyromaniax"	Quiles; Barreto; Melendez; Swel	Q-Unique	4:21
5.	"Underground Vandal"	Wallace	Q-Unique	2:23
6.	"Blaze"	Quiles; Wallace; Barreto; Melendez; Swel; Kinetic Energy; Jeff Wayne; Gary Osborne	Q-Unique	2:46
7.	"Venom"	Quiles; Wallace; Barreto; Marc Cerrone; Alain Wisniak	Q-Unique	2:53
8.	"Frienemies"	Melendez	Q-Unique; Freestyle; D-Stroy	2:05
9.	"Lt. Worf & Chewbacca"	Barreto; Kinetic	Q-Unique	1:47
10.	"Session"	Quiles; Wallace; Melendez; Swel	D-Stroy	3:50
11.	"Shaboing"	Quiles; Wallace; Melendez; Swel	Freestyle	3:48
12.	"Rhyme Time Travel"	Quiles; Manu Dibango; David Jaymes; Geoffrey Deane	Q-Unique	2:49
13.	"Live to Tell"	Wallace; Barreto; Melendez; Stevie Wonder	D-Stroy	3:26
14.	"Seed"	Quiles; Wallace; Barreto; Kinetic	Q-Unique	3:04
15.	"Lunchroom Take-Out"	Swel; GR8 Scott	Q-Unique; Swel	3:50
16.	"Worlds Collide"	Quiles; Wallace; Barreto; Melendez; Swel	Freestyle	4:24
17.	"Flashback"	Quiles; Wallace; Zack de la Rocha	Freestyle	3:00
18.	"D-Sturbed Words"	Melendez	D-Stroy	2:06
19.	"Geembo's Theme"	Quiles; Melendez	Q-Unique; D-Stroy	2:03
20.	"Halloween"	Quiles; Wallace; Barreto; Melendez; Swel; Kinetic; Cindy Wilson; Fred Schneider; Kate Pierson; Keith Strickland; Ricky Wilson; Gary Wright; Mick Jones	Freestyle	4:01
21.	"In Your Town"	Quiles; Wallace; Melendez	D-Stroy	3:43
Total length:				1:00:51

== Charts ==
Chart (1999)	Peak position
US Top R&B/Hip-Hop Albums (Billboard)	78
