= State of Lunacy =

Studio album by Rhyme Asylum
- Released: June 2008
- Genre: Hip Hop
- Length: 60:48
- Label: Rekabet Records
- Producer: Leatherface; S-Type; Budgie

Rhyme Asylum chronology
State of Lunacy (2008)	Solitary Confinement (2010)

State of Lunacy is the debut album by the British hip hop group Rhyme Asylum, released in 2008. It includes guest appearances from Diabolic, Copywrite and Reain.

== Track listing ==
1. "Explorers of the Mind (Intro)" – 0:57
2. "Ground Zero" – 3:37
3. "Straight Jacket Part I" (featuring Reain) – 3:15
4. "The Awakening (Skit)" – 0:58
5. "Lost" – 5:05
6. "Multiplicity" – 4:15
7. "Smoke Screens & Pipe Dreams" – 3:23
8. "Unreasonable" (featuring Diabolic) – 4:49
9. "Poison Penmanship" – 3:22
10. "Test of Faith" – 4:00
11. "Stark Raving Genius" – 5:26
12. "Attitude Problem" (featuring Copywrite) – 4:17
13. "Straight Jacket Part II" (featuring Reain) – 3:03
14. "Holding On" – 4:27
15. "Shadow People (Skit)" – 0:54
16. "Iller Instinct" – 4:45
17. "Multiplicity" (remix) – 3:53

== Credits ==
- All vocals edited and sequenced by Psiklone
- Scratches performed by DJ Supernatural
- All scratches recorded, edited and arranged by Psiklone
- Front cover artwork and design by Skam2?
- Front cover colour by Joel Benjamin
- Photography by Nathan Tribble
- All other artwork and design by Psiklone

== Production ==
Executive produced by Rhyme Asylum. All tracks produced by Leatherface except for

- S-Type – track 6
- Leatherface and Budgie – track 16
