= Nucentz =

Irish rapper

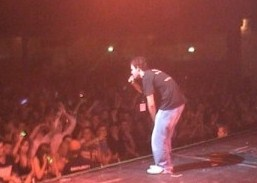

Background information
- Also known as: Nu-Centz, Nuie, Namebrand Nuie
- Born: Robert Byrne; 15 April 1987 (age 39); Tallaght, Dublin
- Genre: Hip Hop
- Occupations: Rapper, song-writer
- Website: www.twitter.com/itsnucentz

Robert Byrne (born 15 April 1987 in Tallaght, Dublin), better known by his stage name Nucentz, also known as Nu-Centz or Nuie, is an Irish rapper. In May 2011, Nucentz won Ireland's First Rap Superstar Competition to collaborate with world-wide hip-hop star Lupe Fiasco.

== Biography ==
=== Background ===
Nucentz was born and raised in Tallaght, Dublin. At age 12, he began penning his own rap tunes under the alias Nu-Centz, a name he once joked that was given to him by his mother. He was a regular guest on 2FM's Friday night Hiphop show "The Big Smoke".

=== Hot Property ===
At age 15, Nucentz and fellow emcee Rawsoul, set up the group Hot Property. The group were also affiliated with Irish rapper Filthy Rich and Dublin singer-songwriter Paul Donnelly. Over the next few years, Hot Property performed in several gigs across the country, and gained recognition for their controversial live sets. Nucentz and Rawsoul's Hot Property album was released in 2010 and featured popular page 3 model Claire Tully on the front and back cover.

=== Collaborations ===
In 2006, Nucentz performed with Brooklyn's underground hiphop emcee Wordsworth (of MTV Lyricist Lounge fame) when he and his rhyme partner Punchline visited Dublin for their Art of Rhyme DVD promotion tour, alongside Craig G of the U.S. rap pioneering "Juice Crew". Following this, Wordsworth collaborated with Nucentz on the track "Feels So Good" produced by Dublin's own ITF World Scratch Champion DJ Flip. Wordsworth once again features on Nucentz' upcoming solo album entitled Tryin' 2 Build a Life on Curse Words. Nucentz has also worked with a variety of the country's top urban DJ's and artists, including critically acclaimed Irish/English vocalist and rapper Maverick Sabre.

=== Gigs ===
Nucentz performed his first gig at 15 in the renowned Temple Bar Music Centre (now The Button Factory). Since then, he has performed in every major Dublin venue, including the O2. Nucentz has also supported Public Enemy, D12, Asher Roth, Styles P, Skinnyman, Royce da 5'9", Plan B and several other successful hip-hop acts in concert.

=== D.F.I Rap Battle League ===
In 2010, Nucentz appeared in two of the successful Da Fighting Irish Rap Battle League (D.F.I) events, winning both of his battles. Nucentz also featured on the DFI compilation mix-tape with his track "Win or Lose".

=== Ireland's First Rap Superstar Competition ===
In April 2011, Nucentz won Ireland's First Rap Superstar competition, securing more than half of the 67,000 votes. The competition was launched by popular Dublin radio station SPIN 1038's breakfast show Fully Charged with Ryan and Tracy, who teamed up with worldwide rap star Lupe Fiasco in a search to find Ireland's best hip-hop talent. Lupe Fiasco informed the entrants "if you bring a nice record, we'll narrow it down to three, we'll pick the best one and I'll do a verse on it". The search began on 7 March, with hundreds of entrants short-listed and eventually narrowed down to three finalists by Lupe and David Miller, vice-president of Atlantic Records. The three final tracks were subsequently put forth for a public vote. Nucentz' winning track, entitled "Had Enough", was produced by Jamie Mc Peake, and features vocals from recently signed Irish R&B singer Gabriella Marsella and musicians Class B. The original track was featured on Nucentz and Terawrizt's 2011 collaborative mixtape Sense the Terror 2. In January 2012, Had Enough debuted on Irish National Radio to much success. The popular radio single received ongoing air time and was play-listed on a host of top national radio stations.

=== Sin City ===
In late 2007, Class A'z released their "Sin City" video, produced by the Lambert Brothers. The tracks itself, featuring Redzer, was lifted from Terawrizt & Nucentz' joint "Sense The Terror 1" Mixtape. The video became an instant hit, earning over 300,000 plays to become the most viewed Irish rap video on youtube. The track also went Number 1 for 5 weeks in the Independent Irish Download Charts.

=== Music style ===
Described by Ireland's biggest music website as "one of the standard bearers of hiphop in this country", Nucentz is also recognised for his easy-to-relate to lyrics, humorous punchlines, and ability to deliver a variety of styles and subject matters Nucentz is currently working on a long-awaited solo album Tryin' 2 Build a Life on Curse Words, set for release this October. The album is set to feature prominent artists from both Europe and America. The video to the lead single "Do You Really Love me" (Feat. Funzo) was released on 15 October. Future Playboy model Shahira Barry starred in the Jonathan Lambert directed video which received over 10,000 hits in its first week. The song received extensive radio play in Dublin.

=== Return to Music & Final release ===
In August 2020, Nucentz announced via Social Media that he was returning to the studio to record music. Shortly after, he released a new single called "Feelin OK 2" which received the "Track of the Week" award on national Irish radio station 2FM. Nucentz appeared on the "No Shame" podcast with former UFC fighter Paddy Holohan, where he revealed that he is back recording and releasing a solo project soon. In August 2021, Nucentz released his final Single 'Pepsi in the Fridge' featuring Singer/Actress Kelly Thornton. The song peaked at Number 1 on the Irish iTunes charts.

== Discography ==
=== Solo albums ===
- Music for the Open Minded (2004)
- I Can Explain (2006)

=== Hot Property album ===
- Hot Property (2010)

=== Solo Mixtapes ===
- Hardest Working Man Volume 1 (2008): Free download
- Hardest Working Man Volume 2 (2009)
- Hardest Working Man Volume 3 (2012)

=== Collaborative Mixtapes ===
- Sense the Terror (2007): Free download
- Sense the Terror 2 (2010)
