= Date of Birth (album) =

Studio album by Arsonists
- Released: September 11, 2001
- Studio: Gallco Enterprises
- Genre: Hip hop
- Length: 53:30
- Label: Matador
- Producers: Arsonists; DJ Doom; Psycho Les

Arsonists chronology
As the World Burns (1999)	Date of Birth (2001)	Lost in the Fire (2018)

Date of Birth is the second full-length studio album by American hip hop group Arsonists. It was released on September 11, 2001, via Matador Records. The recording sessions took place at Gallco Enterprises. The album was produced by members Q-Unique, Jise One and Swel Boogie, as well as DJ Doom and Psycho Les. It features contributions from three of the five original members, with MC D-Story and Freestyle being absent members, as well as guest appearances from Elle Pena, Kinetic Energy, Lori Velez, and Zoey Pena.

== Critical reception ==
Professional ratings
Aggregate scores
Source	Rating
Metacritic	63/100
Review scores
Source	Rating
AllMusic	4/5 stars
RapReviews	9/10

Date of Birth was met with generally favorable reviews from music critics. At Metacritic, which assigns a normalized rating out of 100 to reviews from mainstream publications, the album received an average score of 63, based on seven reviews.

AllMusic's M.F. DiBella wrote: "while the album lapses occasionally with a couple of patches of redundant production, Date of Birth is a strong follow-up from a crew who keep it real by nature". Billboard reviewer praised the album, stating: "some of its strongest work to date". Writing for The A.V. Club, Nathan Rabin found that the album "doesn't reinvent hip-hop, but it mines considerable rewards just by operating within the style's familiar confines".

In mixed reviews, Alternative Press critic stated: "the sample-based backing tracks, hard-hitting but plain, don't have much choice but to play second-best". Sonicset reviewer wrote: "Date Of Birth is packed with hard-driving, repetitive beats that are equal parts Wu-Tang Clan and Gang Starr, yet the music lacks either of those groups' charms". The Wire reviewer resumed: "what's lacking on Date Of Birth, though, is any sort of excitement". Urb reviewer wrote: "much of the album fails to make sparks".

== Track listing ==
All tracks are written by Anthony Quiles, Geraldo Barreto and Swel Boogie, except track 8 co-written with Lori Velez.

No.	Title	Producer(s)	Length
1.	"Date of Birth (Intro)"	Q-Unique	2:23
2.	"Stay Lo"	Q-Unique	2:21
3.	"We Be About"	Q-Unique	3:55
4.	"What You Want?" (featuring Elle Pena and Zoey Pena)	Q-Unique	4:07
5.	"Language Arts"	Q-Unique	3:33
6.	"Respect the Unexpected"	Q-Unique	3:23
7.	"Self-Righteous Spics (Anthem)"	Psycho Les	2:59
8.	"His Hate, Her Love" (featuring Lori Velez)	Q-Unique	4:11
9.	"Burn It Out"	Q-Unique	2:29
10.	"Whatever, Whenever"	Q-Unique	2:48
11.	"Bleep"	Q-Unique	2:47
12.	"Wordplay"	Q-Unique	3:32
13.	"Alive"	Q-Unique; Jise One; Swel; DJ Doom	3:51
14.	"Epitaph"	Q-Unique	2:30
15.	"Space Junk" (featuring Kinetic Energy)	Q-Unique	3:34
16.	"Millionaire"	Q-Unique	5:07
Total length:			53:30

== Personnel ==
- Anthony "Q-Unique" Quiles – lyrics, vocals, producer (tracks: 1–6, 8–16), mixing
- Geraldo "Jise One" Barreto – lyrics, vocals, producer (track 13)
- Swel Boogie – lyrics, vocals, producer (track 13)
- Elle Pena – vocals (track 4)
- Zoey Pena – vocals (track 4)
- Lori Velez – lyrics & vocals (track 8)
- Kinetic Energy – vocals (track 15)
- Lester "Psycho Les" Fernandez – producer (track 7)
- Deudy "DJ Doom" Torres – producer (track 13)
- Jesus Roa – engineering, mixing, management
- Sanchez Stanfield – art direction, design
- Carl Saytor – photography
- E. Victoria Toro – photography
