= D.J. Mek =

Irish DJ

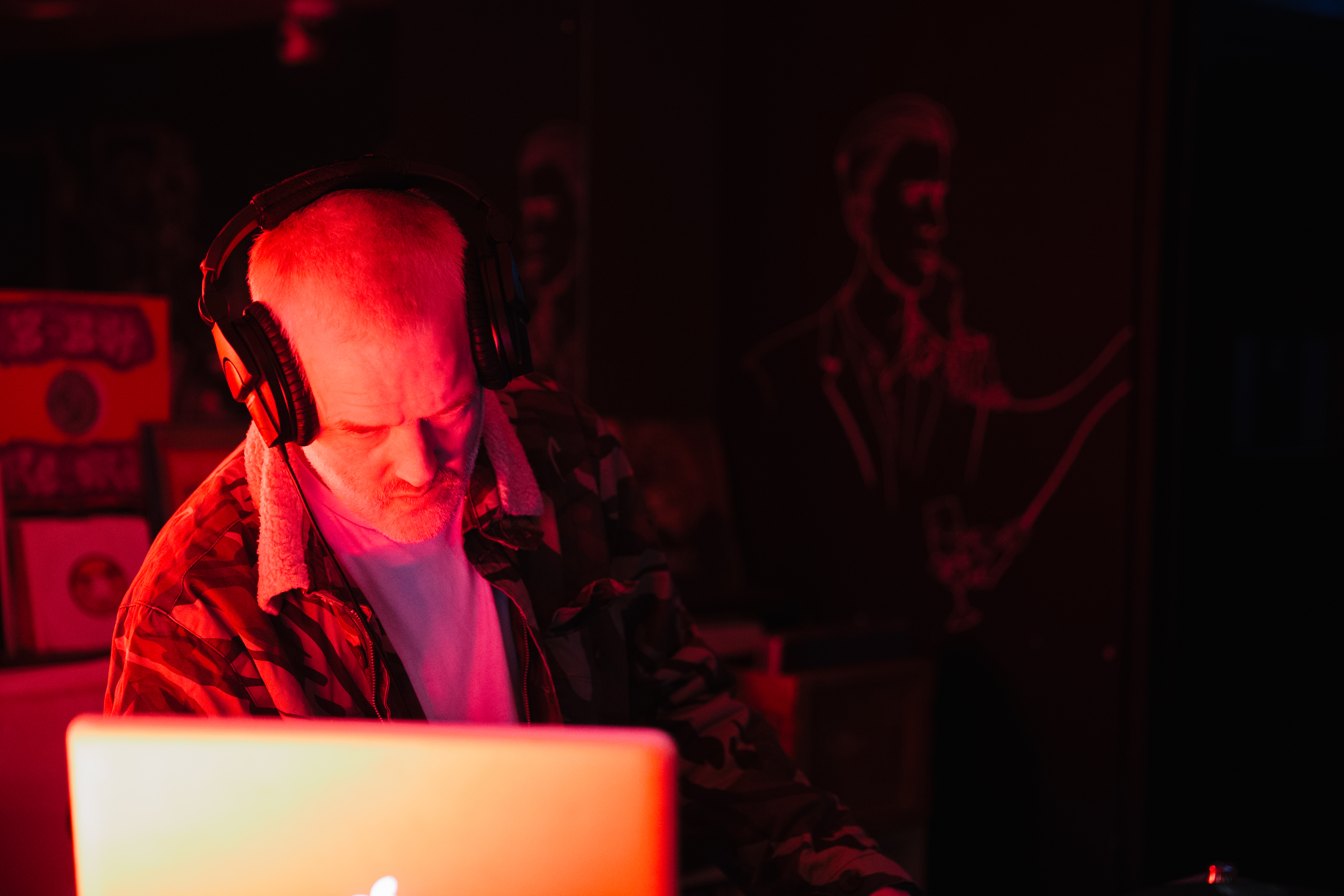
DJ Meek
- Also known as: D.J. Meek
- Born: Pete Meekcall
- Origin: Dublin, Ireland
- Genres: Dancehall; hip hop; indie
- Occupations: DJ; producer; turntablist
- Instrument: Turntables
- Years active: 1987–present
- Labels: Island Records; 11 Records

Pete Mescall, professionally known by his stage name DJ Mek or Pete Mescalero, is an Irish award-winning hip hop DJ/turntablist and producer. He has won 5 Irish national Disco Mix Club championships and remixed/produced artists like Ian Brown, The Frames, Zig and Zag and Jon Carter's Monkey Mafia. In 1989, he became the first DJ from the Republic of Ireland to enter the U.K. DMC Championships, and went on to win 5 Irish national titles. He was briefly banned from entering the championships but that decision was later overturned. His group ScaryEire were the first Irish rap act to be signed to a major label. He retired from competitive mixing competitions in 2000 but returned in 2021 to place 5th in the DMC World Foundation Finals

== Mixing Achievements ==
- 1989 Northern Ireland DMC Runner-Up
- 1990 Republic of Ireland DMC Champion
- 1991 Republic of Ireland DMC Champion
- 1992 Republic of Ireland DMC Champion
- 1997 Northern Ireland DMC Champion
- 1997 Vestax UK Runner-Up
- 1998 Irish D.T.F. Champion
- 1998 UK Battle Royale Runner-Up
- 1999 Republic of Ireland DMC Champion
- 2021 DMC World Foundation 5th place

== Production & Remixes ==
- Monkey Mafia 12" - Blow The Whole Joint Up (Heavenly Records)
- The Frames 12" - 'Monument' (ZTT Records) -DJ Mek Remix
- Ghost and Jay - '2 Innocent/Good and Evil'
- Scary Eire 12" - 'Dole Q' (Eleven Records)
- Planet Rap Compilation - "Lost For Words" (Tommy Boy Records)
- Third Eye Surfers - 'Sunny and Share' (DJ.Mek scratch edit)
- Exile Eye - 'Heavyweight' (Equilibrium Recordings)
- Ian Brown - 'Cocaine in my brain' (Polydor)
- Gemma Fox - 'Messy' (Polydor)
- Rodney P. - 'Flashbacks' (Riddim Killa)
- Ian Brown - 'F.E.A.R.' (Polydor)
- Ian Brown - 'Sister Rose' (Polydor)
- La Coka Nostra - 'Get Outta My way'
- La Coka Nostra - 'Tony Montana' featuring B-Real of Cypress Hill & Sick Jacken of Psycho Realm
- Scary Eire - 'The Scary Era' album
- Replicants - 'Jiro' (DJ Mek Scratch Re-Fix) (Electro Empire)
- Madi Mai - 'Anti-Clockwise (DJ Mek Re-Fix) (Instinctive Behaviour Records)

== Mixtape / C.D. releases ==
- Word of Mouth / Arista Records - All Shook Up - Volume 2
- DJ Mek - Frontline - Volume 1
- DJ Mek - Frontline - Volume 2
- DJ Mek - Frontline - Volume 3
- DJ Mek - Frontline - Volume 4
- DJ Mek - Volume 5 - D.B.B.S.

== Media / TV appearances ==
- Jo Maxi
- Nighthawks (TV series)
- MTV
- The Saturday Night Show
- Zig and Zag (TV series)
- Origins: The Story Of Irish Hip Hop documentary
