= Arsonists (group) =

American hip hop group

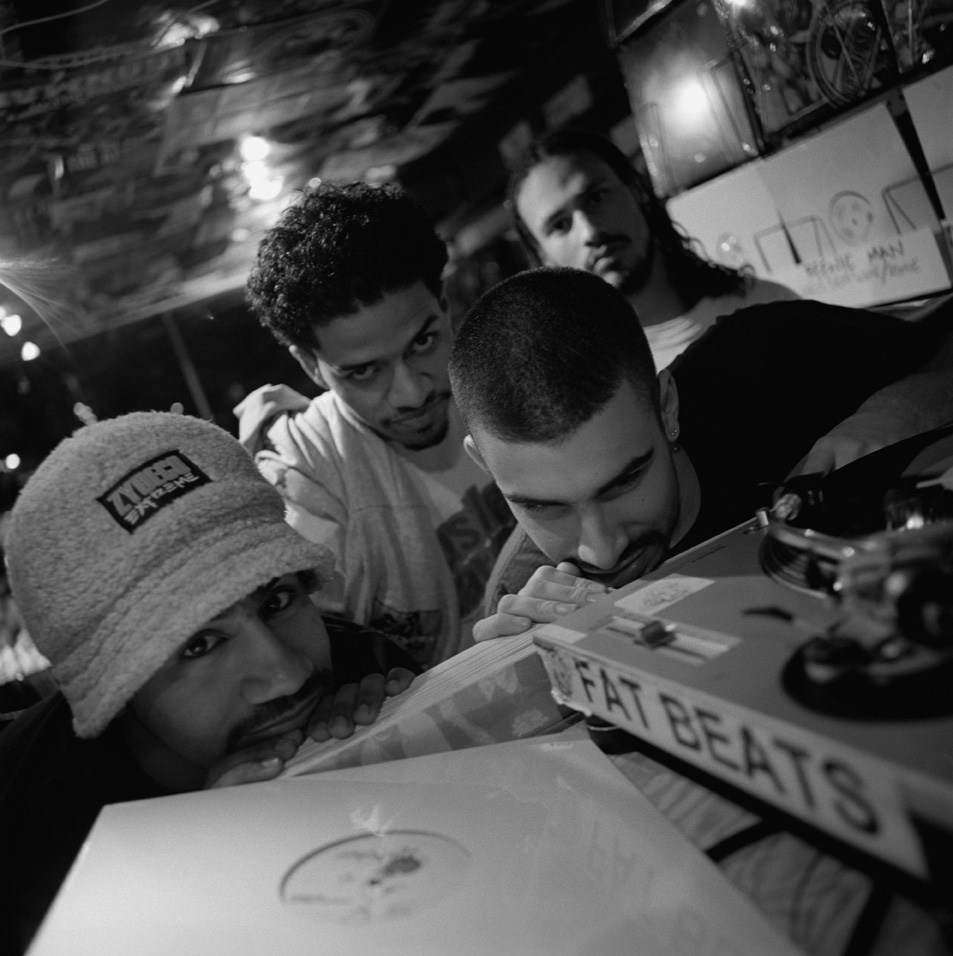
- Arsonists in 1997

Background information
- Also known as: Bushwick Bomb Squad
- Origin: Brooklyn, New York, U.S.
- Genres: Hip hop
- Years active: 1993–present
- Labels: Fondle 'Em; Matador
- Members: Q-Unique; D-Stroy; Freestyle; Jise One; Swel Boogie
- Past members: Ching Rock; Kinetic Energy; Kriminal Krash

Arsonists are an underground hip hop group. Their album, As the World Burns (1999), reached No. 78 on the US Billboard Top R&B/Hip-Hop Albums; its single, "Pyromaniax", reached No. 43 on the US Billboard Hot Rap Singles chart.

== History ==
The group was formed with five members in 1993 in Bushwick, Brooklyn, New York, as Bushwick Bomb Squad. The main members were Q-Unique, D-Stroy, Freestyle, Swel Boogie and Jise One, although the number of members eventually grew to eight with Kinetic NRG, Ching Rock and Kriminal Krash. Q-Unique was a member of New York City's well-known breakdancing crew, the Rock Steady Crew. The group released a single, "The Session", in 1996, which was played on New York radio stations and brought offers from record labels. They signed with the independent label Fondle 'Em Records and changed their name to the Arsonists. They released their first album, As the World Burns, in 1999 on Matador Records, an indie rock label that ventured into hip hop music for the release. The album received critical acclaim, but did not achieve mainstream commercial success; it reached No. 78 on Billboard's Top R&B/Hip-Hop Albums chart. They appeared on the final album by the digital hardcore band Atari Teenage Riot, 60 Second Wipeout, that year. The group went from five members down to three: Q-Unique, Jise One and Swel Boogie, for their follow-up album, Date of Birth in 2001. With their live performances, the group is known to be very varied in its rap style, drawing on many old school hip hop and east coast hip hop influences. Kansas City's alternative weekly newspaper, The Pitch, described them as "one of the best live bands in hip-hop" in 2001. On 18 August 2011, Arsonists played the first show in 11 years that had all four members on stage at Hip Hop Kemp in Hradec Králové, Czech Republic.

A new album titled Lost in the Fire was released in 2018 with all five of the original members Q-Unique, Swel Boogie, Jise One, D-Stroy and Freestyle returning. The album features six new songs alongside a selection of previously unreleased and rare songs recorded between 1996 and 2000.

== Personal information ==
A portrait of group member Jise One was posted to Humans of New York in June 2017. He took the stage name 'Jise' in honor of his older brother, who had been murdered in 1989.

== Discography ==
Albums

- As the World Burns (Matador, 1999)
- Date of Birth (Matador, 2001)
- Lost in the Fire (Below System, 2018)

Singles

- "The Session" (1996)
- "Blaze/Geembo's Theme/Flashback" (Fondle 'Em, 1998)
- "Backdraft" (Matador, 1999)
- "Pyromaniax" (Matador, 1999)
- "Backdraft/Halloween II" (Matador, 1999)
- "As the World Burns" (Matador, 1999) [instrumental limited edition]
