= Rhyme Asylum =

UK musical group

- Origin: London, England
- Genres: Hardcore Hip Hop, Conscious Hip Hop, Horrorcore
- Years active: 2002–2012
- Labels: Unsigned, Rekabet Records
- Past members: Plazma; Possessed; Psiklone; Skirmish; Leatherface (producer)
- Website: www.rhymeasylum.com

Rhyme Asylum was an English, London-based hip hop group formed in 2002 by MCs Possessed, Psiklone and Skirmish. Leatherface and Plazma (who did not return for the second album) joined in 2004.

The group's music features vivid imagery, complex wordplay and intricate rhyme schemes. Though unsigned, they have developed a cult following.

Critics and fans have cited Rhyme Asylum as one of the most lyrically skilled hip-hop acts of all time, drawing comparisons to highly respected underground and mainstream lyricists for their precision, creativity, and unconventional approach to narrative rap. Despite their technical skill and devoted fanbase, they remained largely underground and received limited mainstream recognition.

== Biography ==
Their recognition originates from the Deal Real open mic sessions between 2004 and 2005. Their debut album State of Lunacy was released in June 2008 and featured US rappers Copywrite and Diabolic. Both Plazma and Leatherface left the group shortly after the release of State of Lunacy.

Their second album Solitary Confinement was released in April 2010 featuring Crooked I, Ill Bill and frequent collaborator Reain. For the first time, Rhyme Asylum recruited outside producers.

Later in 2010, the group released Solitary Confinement: The Overdose EP on 12" vinyl. The EP contains eight songs from Solitary Confinement and was launched at a Dilated Peoples & Rhyme Asylum show in Hamburg, Germany.

Rhyme Asylum have performed across the UK and Europe.

== Discography ==
- State of Lunacy (2008)
- Solitary Confinement (2010)

== Appeared on ==
- The Memory Hole - Manage (2014)
- At Nightfall - Ugly Tony (2011)
- Seance - Unusual Suspects (2010)
- Death Dubs and Raw Roughs - Respek BA (2009)
- Character Assassins (Vol. 2) - Various Artists (2006)
