= To Thine Own Self Be True =

Studio album by La Coka Nostra
- Released: November 4, 2016
- Genre: Hip hop
- Length: 44:21
- Label: Fat Beats Records
- Producer: DJ Lethal; J57; Leaf Dog; The Arcitype; Statik Selektah; Marco Polo; Vherbal; Salam Wreck; ChumZilla

La Coka Nostra chronology
Masters of the Dark Arts (2012)	To Thine Own Self Be True (2016)

Professional ratings
Review scores
Source	Rating
RapReviews	8.5/10

To Thine Own Self Be True is the third studio album by hip hop supergroup La Coka Nostra, released on November 4, 2016, via Fat Beats Records.

== Background ==
In 2012, La Coka Nostra released their second album, Masters of the Dark Arts. It was the group's first project without Everlast and also their most critically acclaimed project, featuring collaborations with Vinnie Paz, Sean Price and production from DJ Premier and Statik Selektah. Since their debut, the group has become known for their energetic live performances and controversial subject matter, including on To Thine Own Self Be True. "This album was created during a time of unique and individual transformation for each member of the group," Ill Bill stated. "Speaking for myself, it's been a heavy last couple of years. It's definitely the most personal record we've made under the La Coka banner and while we're still making music that's hard as fuck, there's a maturity to this latest batch of songs that makes it different from a lot of the older stuff. I notice the biggest reactions come from the songs our listeners can personally relate to and we needed to make a record like this right now, not only for the fans, but for ourselves. I got a lot off my chest on this one. Making music can be extremely therapeutic and making To Thine Own Self Be True was a rebirth and a re-ignition for me." Slaine had a similar take on the project's therapeutic value: "You don't put as many years in the game as we have without having ups and downs. We all have gone through struggle and adversity-personally and professionally. This album was recorded as I walked out of a very dark time toward a place of truth and understanding. Music has been how I feed my family, my plane ticket around the world and a place I've built real friendships; but at the very core it's a tool I use to get through life. This album is a moment in time. It is visceral and real." While DJ Lethal continues to oversee the production of To Thine Own Self Be True, the group also enlisted Statik Selektah, Marco Polo, Salam Wreck and ChumZilla (from the Demigodz) and vocal contributions from extended family members such as Vinnie Paz, Apathy, Q-Unique, Sick Jacken, SKAM2? & Rite Hook.

== Track listing ==
No.	Title	Writer(s)	Producer(s)	Length
1.	"Dark Day Road"	William Braunstein; George Carroll; James Victor Heinz	J57	2:46
2.	"I Need Help" (featuring Sick Jacken)	Braunstein; Carroll; Jack Gonzalez; James W. Leigh	Leaf Dog	3:38
3.	"Waging War" (featuring Rite Hook)	Braunstein; Carroll; Terrence C. Nugent; Janos Fulop	The Arcitype	2:45
4.	"Murdered Tonight"	Braunstein; Carroll; Leor Dimant	DJ Lethal	3:09
5.	"Stay True"	Braunstein; Carroll; Patrick Baril	Statik Selektah	2:51
6.	"Blind" (featuring Q-Unique and Sadie Vada)	Braunstein; Carroll; Anthony Quiles; Marco Bruno	Marco Polo	4:42
7.	"Crispy Innovators" (featuring Vinnie Paz)	Braunstein; Carroll; Vincenzo Luvineri; Kevin Elliott	Vherbal	4:06
8.	"Archie Bunker" (featuring Nems)	Braunstein; Carroll; Travis Doyle; Dimant	DJ Lethal	3:42
9.	"High Times" (featuring Sick Jacken)	Braunstein; Carroll; Gonzalez; Salam Nassar	Salam Wreck	4:12
10.	"America" (featuring Apathy)	Braunstein; Carroll; Chad Bromley; Dimant	DJ Lethal	4:01
11.	"Now Or Never" (featuring SKAM2? and Rite Hook)	Braunstein; Carroll; Kwesi Ogbourne; Nugent; Dimant	DJ Lethal	4:00
12.	"To Thine Own Self Be True" (featuring Rite Hook)	Braunstein; Carroll; Nugent; Adam Mathiason	ChumZilla	4:29
Total length:				44:21

== Personnel ==
The following lists the personnel on the track:

- Danny Boy O'Connor – art direction
- Treasure Little – art direction
- Randy Riggs – layout
- Peter Humphreys – mastering (tracks: 1–12)
- Statik Selektah – mixing (track: 5)
- Scott Stallone – Hohner melodica (track: 8), mixing (tracks: 1–4, 6–12)
- Eric Bobo – live percussion (track 9)

== Charts ==
Chart (2016)	Peak position
Swiss Albums (Schweizer Hitparade)	95
US Top R&B/Hip-Hop Albums (Billboard)	38

== See also ==
- Hamlet, Shakespeare's play in which the phrase "to thine own self be true" is famously spoken by Polonius
- "To Thine Own Elf, Be True", a 1990 episode of My Two Dads
