= La Coka Nostra =

American hip hop group

- Origin: Boston, Massachusetts, U.S.; New York City, U.S.
- Genres: Hip hop
- Years active: 2006–present
- Labels: Suburban Noize; Uncle Howie; Fat Beats
- Members: DJ Lethal; Danny Boy; Ill Bill; Slaine
- Past members: Big Left; Everlast
- Website: lacokanostra.com

La Coka Nostra (short LCN) is an American hip hop supergroup currently composed of Danny Boy, Slaine, DJ Lethal, and Ill Bill. In 2004, its creation started when Danny Boy (Daniel O'Connor) brought two young artists, Slaine (George Carroll) and Big Left (John Faster), to meet DJ Lethal (Leor Dimant), the DJ from his former group House of Pain. They decided to make a group, whose name came about when O'Connor teased other members with that nickname after they had a night out. They started releasing music on MySpace, and went viral.

Eventually, it was felt that there was a void and experienced rapper Ill Bill (William Braunstein) was asked to join. Eventually, former House of Pain colleague Everlast (Erik Schrody), showed interest to join. By 2008, the group consisted of O'Connor, Carroll, Diamant, Braunstein, and Schrody (who left some time after the first album was released). Their debut album A Brand You Can Trust was released on July 14, 2009, and it was appreciated by many for its raw sound that some felt missing from hip hop at the time.

In 2012, came their second album, Masters of the Dark Arts, which reached 176 on Billboard Top Current Albums, 40 on Independent Albums, and 31 on Top R&B/Hip-Hop Albums. Their third album To Thine Own Self Be True was released in 2016. The album reached 38 on the Billboard Top R&B/Hip-Hop Albums.

== Biography ==
The genesis of the group started in late 2004, at the time hip hop artist Danny Boy O'Connor had taken time off from rap after the break-up of House of Pain, O'Connor took to working in video production and fashion as well as mentoring other artists. O'Connor explains that he took notice of two up and comers Big Left (John Faster) and Slaine (George Carroll), and brought them to meet his former DJ from House of Pain, DJ Lethal (Leor Diamant). They decided to make a group with an additional rapper, who did not stay too long, that Diamant took under his wing and asked to join as well O'Connor becoming as its hype man and art director. The group's name came about, when O'Connor teased other members with that nickname, after they had a night out. O'Connor, Diamant, Carroll and Faster as La Coka Nostra released a three-song demo on MySpace, and went viral.

It was eventually felt that there was a void and experienced rapper Ill Bill (William Braunstein) was asked to join. Eventually, former House of Pain colleague Everlast (Erik Schrody), showed interest to join. By 2008, the group consisted of O'Connor, Carroll, Diamant, Braunstein, and Schrody.

In late 2008, the group signed to Suburban Noize Records and released the long delayed debut album A Brand You Can Trust on July 14, 2009. The album took so long to complete due to O'Connor's refusal to have the members collaborate via e-mail; instead, he would gather everyone at the studio. This took time due to the recording of Braunstein and Schrody's solo albums as well as various tours and other commitments. A Brand You Can Trust features fifteen tracks and guest appearances from Snoop Dogg, Bun B, Sick Jacken, B-Real, Sen Dog, Immortal Technique, Big Left and Q-Unique. Though similar stylistically to the group's prior online releases, it features songs grounded more in reality. Subjects touched upon include politics, death, drug addiction, raising a child and terrorism. AllMusic gave four out of five stars. Andrew Kameka of HipHopDX wrote that "the album is a mostly solid effort and exactly what someone would expect from a supergroup of like-minded members known for high-energy music". Adam Kennedy of the BBC while praising some the moments of the album said "it’s a tantalising parting taste of potential capabilities, yet until they improve a customer satisfaction hit rate that barely troubles one in three tunes here". Steve Juon of RapReviews gave it a seven out of ten. Thomas Quinlan of Exclaim! said "La Coka Nostra are an interesting collection of collaborators that live up to the hype".

On March 2, 2012, it was announced that Schrody would be leaving La Coka Nostra due to his daughter's medical issues.

That same year, La Coka Nostra released their second album, Masters of the Dark Arts. It reached 176 on Billboard Top Current Albums, 40 on Independent Albums, and 31 on Top R&B/Hip-Hop Albums. Adam Fleischer of XXL magazine noted that "La Coka Nostra remain decidedly true to their core with their new album" and "that they are indeed masters of the dark arts". HipHopDX gave the album a positive review and noted that the album was a "sinister, happily violent detour from the pop-centric". Peter Marrack of Exclaim! also gave the album a positive review and noted that the album was "more or less a one-way ticket to hell". Nathan G. O'Brien of Scene Point Blank gave it four out five star and said "with Master of the Dark Arts La Coka Nostra’s pluperfect union of bombastic boom-bap, record scratching, and realism-based hardcore rhyming".

In 2016, La Coka Nostra released To Thine Own Self Be True. The album reached 38 on the Billboard Top R&B/Hip-Hop Albums. Steve Juon of RapReviews gave eight point five out of ten and wrote "for a blissful 45 minutes it's an uncut dose of that nostalgia straight through the ear canals to the dopamine centers of my brain".

== Members ==
- Ill Bill (2006–present)
- Slaine (2006–present)
- DJ Lethal (2006–present)
- Danny Boy (2006–present)

Past members

- Everlast (2006-2012)
- Big Left (2006-2008)

== Discography ==
=== Studio albums ===
- A Brand You Can Trust (2009)
- Masters of the Dark Arts (2012)
- To Thine Own Self Be True (2016)

=== Extended plays ===
- 100% Pure Coka (2009)

=== Mixtapes ===
- The Height of Power (2009)
- The Audacity of Coke (2009)
- The Maple Leaf Massacre (2012)

=== Appearances on other albums ===
- 2006: "Fuck Tony Montana" (D.J. Mek Remix) featuring Big Left
- 2006: "Get Outta My Way" (D.J. Mek Remix) featuring B-Real of Cypress Hill & Sick Jacken of Psycho Realm
- 2006: "This Is War" featuring Big Left Ill Bill Is The Future Vol. 2
- 2006: "It's a Beautiful Thing" Ill Bill Is The Future Vol. 2
- 2007: "Where Hope Goes to Die" Black Metal
- 2007: "Soldiers of Fortune" (produced by Sicknature) Black Metal
- 2007: "Get Outta My Way" featuring Big Left Black Metal
- 2007: "Broken Pieces" featuring Jeru the Damaja Black Metal
- 2009: "Do It" (produced by DJ Solo) Soul Assassins: Intermission
- 2009: "Hey Young World" featuring Heltah Skeltah The Trojan Horse
- 2010: "Skull & Guns" featuring Slaine & Everlast DJ Muggs vs. Ill Bill: Kill Devil Hills
- 2012: "Geometry of Business": Vinnie Paz God of the Serengeti
- 2015: "The Hard Way" House of Slaine

=== Music videos ===
Year	Album	Title	Director	Other featured artist
2008	A Brand That You Can Trust	That's Coke	Danny Boy (rapper)	
2009	A Brand That You Can Trust	I'm An American	n/c	B-Real
2009	A Brand That You Can Trust	Cousin of Death	Frank Sacramento	
2012	Masters of the Dark Arts	Mind Your Business	J.F. Martin/Tom Vujcic	
2012	Masters of the Dark Arts	Creed of the Greedier	Tom Vujcic	
2012	Masters of the Dark Arts	Letter to Ouisch	Danny Boy	
2015	To Thine Own Self Be True	Dark Day Road	Bernard Rose (director)	
2016	To Thine Own Self Be True	Waging War	Tom Vujcic	
