= Solitary Confinement (Rhyme Asylum album) =

Studio album by Rhyme Asylum
- Released: 23 April 2010
- Genre: Hip hop
- Length: 71:39
- Label: Rhyme Asylum Records
- Producer: Think; Engineer; Al'Tarba; DJ Butcher; Profound Beats; The Returners; Hirolla; Chemo; Ill Fated

Rhyme Asylum chronology
State Of Lunacy (2008)	Solitary Confinement (2010)

Solitary Confinement is the second and final studio album by British hip hop group, Rhyme Asylum. The guests included Crooked I, Ill Bill, DarkStar and Rhyme Asylum longtime collaborator Reain aKa Whasisface.

== Track listing ==
1. Solitary Confinement (4:32)
2. For the Hate (4:38)
3. This is Where (3:42)
4. Divine Right of Kings (3:51)
5. Next Level (4:05)
6. Event Horizon (feat. Crooked I) (5:13)
7. Axe of Violence (2:39)
8. I Know (5:30)
9. Strange Deranged (feat. Reain) (3:34)
10. The 'N' Word (2:05)
11. The Art of Raw (3:41)
12. Returmination (3:58)
13. Who Goes There (4:11)
14. Don't Wanna Be (4:02)
15. Straight Jacket Immortals (3:45)
16. Broken Window (4:59)
17. Open Mic Surgery (feat. DarkStar and Ill Bill) (4:14)
18. Life Support (3:51)

== Production ==
- Tracks 1 & 11 Produced By: Think
- Track 4 Produced By: Crate Creeps
- Tracks 5 & 9 Produced By: Al'Tarba
- Tracks 4 Produced By: DJ Butcher
- Track 7 Produced By: Profound Beats
- Track 12 Produced By: The Returners
- Track 14 Produced By: Hirolla
- Track 15 Produced By: Chemo
- Track 18 Produced By: Ill Fated
- Tracks 2, 3, 6, 8, 10, 13, 16 & 17 Produced By: Engineer

== Credits ==
- Arranged By: Psiklone & Chemo
- Cuts by: Psiklone
- Recorded, Mixed and Mastered By: Chemo @ Kilamanjaro Studios
- Photography by: RomanyWG
- Graphic Design by: Psiklone
