= Q-Unique =

American musician

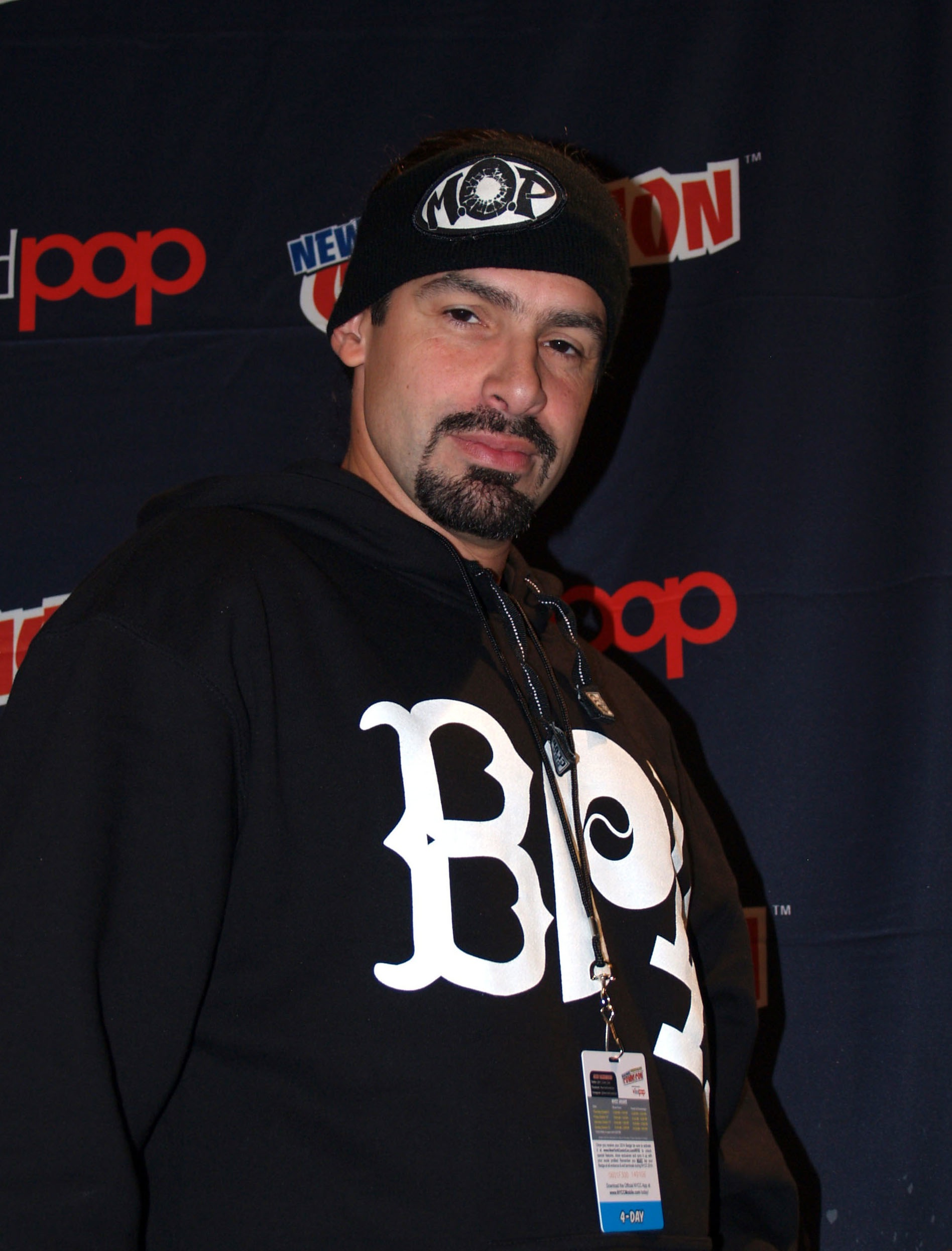
- Q-Unique in 2014

Background information
- Born: Anthony Quiles; June 27, 1972 (age 54); New York City, U.S.
- Genres: Hip hop, hard rock
- Occupations: Rapper, singer, producer
- Years active: 1992–present
- Labels: Uncle Howie; Fat Beats; Capital Q Music
- Member of: Stillwell; Rock Steady Crew
- Formerly of: Arsonists
- Website: q-unique.com

Anthony Quiles (born June 27, 1972), better known by his stage name Q-Unique, is an American rapper, record producer and a member of rap group Arsonists and the hard rock band Stillwell. He also contributed vocals for dance/hip-hop group C+C Music Factory.

== Discography ==
=== Solo albums ===
- 2004: Vengeance is Mine
- 2010: Between Heaven & Hell
- 2016: BlaQ Coffee
- 2018: The Mechanic
- 2023: Pound for Pound (EP)
- 2024: Royal Blood (EP)

=== Compilation & Mixtape ===
- 2003: Mixture
- 2006: Street Supreme
- 2008: The Collabo Tapes Vol.1
- 2009: The Collabo Tapes Vol.2
- 2011: Throwback
- 2013: The Remix Mixtape
- 2013: Marvels Team-Up
- 2014: DJ Presto One vs Q-Unique & ILL BILL
- 2018: Momentum
- 2023: The Legacy Series Vol.1
- 2023: The Legacy Series Vol.2

=== With Arsonists ===
- 1998: Arsonists Mixtape
- 1999: As the World Burns
- 2001: Past, Present, and Future
- 2001: Date of Birth
- 2018: Lost In The Fire

=== With Stillwell ===
- 2011: Dirtbag
- 2011: Surrounded by Liars (EP)
- 2015: Raise It Up
- 2020: Supernatural Miracle
- 2022: Rock The House

=== Collaboration with Trem One ===
- 2011: Omega Man Mk2 (feat. Q Unique)

== Singles ==
=== Solo ===
- "Green Grass" (2011)

=== With Arsonists ===
- "The Session" (1996)
- "Blaze/Geembo's Theme/Flashback" (1998), Fondle 'Em
- "Backdraft" (1999), Matador
- "Pyromaniax" (1999), Matador
- "Backdraft/Halloween II" (1999), Matador
- "As the World Burns" (1999), Matador – instrumental limited edition

== Guest appearances ==
List of non-single guest appearances, with other performing artists, showing year released and album name
Title	Year	Other artist(s)	Album
"Shadow Of The Guillotine"	2012	Vinnie Paz	God of the Serengeti
"Blind"	2016	La Coka Nostra, Sadie Vada	To Thine Own Self Be True
