= Axis Mundi (Decrepit Birth album) =

2017 studio album by Decrepit Birth

Studio album by Decrepit Birth
- Released: July 21, 2017
- Recorded: 2015–2016
- Studio: Various: Private Ear Recording (Winnipeg, Canada); Matt Sotelo's own Studio; Sean Martinez's own Studio
- Genre: Technical death metal
- Length: 41:44
- Labels: Nuclear Blast; Agonia

Decrepit Birth chronology
Polarity (2010)	Axis Mundi (2017)

Axis Mundi is the fourth studio album by technical death metal band Decrepit Birth, released on July 21, 2017, via Nuclear Blast (in North America) and Agonia (in Europe and the rest of the world). It is the band's first studio album to feature drummer Sam Paulicelli and bassist Sean Martinez, as well as the first album since 2010's Polarity.

== Recording and release ==
Axis Mundi was recorded during 2015–2016 at various studios: drums part were recorded by Ryan Forsyth at Private Ear Studios in Winnipeg, Canada; bass and guitars part were recorded at guitarist Matt Sotelo and bassist Sean Martinez's own studios respectively. Stefano Morabito handled the mixing and mastering duties at 16th Cellar Studios in Rome, Italy. The cover artwork was once again designed by artist Dan Seagrave.

On September 3, 2015, drummer Sam Paulicelli posted a studio footage on YouTube about his drum tracking for Decrepit Birth's brand new album. On September 22, 2015, the band confirmed on their Facebook page that vocalist Bill Robinson was in the studio tracking vocal part. The album was officially completed on October 17, 2016.

On May 18, 2017, the band announced that the album would be released on July 21, 2017, along with the track listing, cover artwork and an accompanying 360° lyric video for the song "Epigenetic Triplicty". The second song, "Hieroglyphic", was available for streaming on YouTube on June 15, 2017.

== Background ==
In the band's official biography, guitarist and main songwriter Matt Sotelo commented on Axis Mundi:

We've gone through an evolution throughout the years. The last couple of albums we had, Diminishing Between Worlds and Polarity, were more progressive death metal. They were different from ...And Time Begins, which is a different genre of death metal. It's more brutal. I'm the type of guy who likes to experiment. ...And Time Begins has no solos. It's all really fast palm-muted riffs. The other albums breathed more with the guitars. I let chords ring out on Diminishing Between Worlds and Polarity. Axis Mundi is combination of all the stuff I'm into. I like it a lot right now. It's more melodic. The riffs repeat intentionally. I want to have fun with these songs.

== Track listing ==
All tracks are written by Decrepit Birth, except where noted.

No.	Title	Length
1.	"Vortex of Infinity – Axis Mundi"	4:16
2.	"Spirit Guide"	5:33
3.	"The Sacred Geometry"	4:26
4.	"Hieroglyphic"	5:16
5.	"Transcendental Paradox"	4:31
6.	"Mirror of Humanity"	4:30
7.	"Ascendant"	4:44
8.	"Epigenic Triplicity"	5:44
9.	"Embryogenesis" (instrumental)	2:44
Total length:		41:44

Digipak edition bonus tracks
No.	Title	Lyrics	Music	Length
10.	"Orion" (instrumental; Metallica cover)		James Hetfield; Cliff Burton; Kirk Hammett	8:10
11.	"Desperate Cry" (Sepultura cover)	Andreas Kisser	Sepultura	6:28
12.	"Infecting the Crypts" (Suffocation cover)	Doug Cerrito	Cerrito; Terrance Hobbs; Josh Barohn	4:50
Total length:				61:12

== Personnel ==
Credits are adapted from the album's liner notes.

Decrepit Birth

- Bill Robinson − vocals
- Matt Sotelo − guitars, bass (track 11), MIDI sequencing
- Sam Paulicelli − drums, bass (track 10)
- Sean Martinez − bass

Additional musicians

- Paul McGuire − backing vocals (track 2)

Production

- Ryan Forsyth − drum recording
- Stefano Morabito − re-amping, mixing, mastering
- Dan Seagrave − cover art
- Michał "P. (Cursed Art)" Kaczkowski − layout
- Tyler Asselin – photography
