= The Best of Suffocation =

Greatest hits album by Suffocation
- Released: January 29, 2008
- Recorded: 1991, 1993, 1995
- Genre: Brutal death metal; technical death metal
- Length: 55:23
- Label: Roadrunner

Suffocation chronology
Suffocation (2006)	The Best of Suffocation (2008)	Blood Oath (2009)

The Best of Suffocation is a best-of compilation album by the American death metal band Suffocation. It was released through Roadrunner Records on January 29, 2008.

== Track listing ==
No.	Title	Length
1.	"Liege of Inveracity" (Effigy of the Forgotten)	4:31
2.	"Infecting the Crypts" (Effigy of the Forgotten)	4:49
3.	"Effigy of the Forgotten" (Effigy of the Forgotten)	3:50
4.	"Seeds of the Suffering" (Effigy of the Forgotten)	5:52
5.	"Jesus Wept" (Effigy of the Forgotten)	3:42
6.	"Marital Decimation" (Breeding the Spawn)	4:05
7.	"Prelude to Repulsion" (Breeding the Spawn)	4:49
8.	"Anomalistic Offerings" (Breeding the Spawn)	4:40
9.	"Breeding the Spawn" (Pierced from Within)	5:09
10.	"Pierced from Within" (Pierced from Within)	4:25
11.	"Thrones of Blood" (Pierced from Within)	5:15
12.	"Brood of Hatred" (Pierced from Within)	4:36
Total length:		55:49

Tracks 1–5 were taken from Effigy of the Forgotten, 6–8 from Breeding the Spawn, and 9–12 from Pierced from Within.
