= Pinnacle of Bedlam =

- Cover art by Raymond Swanland

Studio album by Suffocation
- Released: February 15, 2013
- Recorded: 2012
- Genre: Technical death metal
- Length: 38:22
- Label: Nuclear Blast
- Producer: Suffocation, Zeuss, Joe Cincotta

Suffocation chronology
Blood Oath (2009)	Pinnacle of Bedlam (2013)	...Of the Dark Light (2017)

Professional ratings
Review scores
Source	Rating
About.com	4.5/5 stars
AllMusic	4/5 stars
Decibel	8/10
PopMatters	8/10

Pinnacle of Bedlam is the seventh studio album by American death metal band Suffocation. It is the band's first full-length record since Pierced from Within to not feature Mike Smith (although he makes a guest appearance on the final track), instead the album features returning drummer Dave Culross, making this his only full-length record with Suffocation and his first release overall with the band since 1998's Despise the Sun. Track 10, 'Beginning of Sorrow', is a re-recording of the track of the same name from the album Breeding the Spawn. It is also the band's last album with longtime guitarist Guy Marchais.

A limited edition release of the CD included a DVD containing the 75-minute documentary The Making of Pinnacle of Bedlam.

In its first week, the album sold about 3,200 copies and landed at the 152 position on the Billboard 200.

== Track listing ==
All lyrics are written by Derek Boyer, except where noted; all music is composed by Terrance Hobbs, except where noted.

No.	Title	Lyrics	Music	Length
1.	"Cycles of Suffering"			3:56
2.	"Purgatorial Punishment"		Guy Marchais; Hobbs	2:44
3.	"Eminent Wrath"			3:40
4.	"As Grace Descends"			3:04
5.	"Sullen Days"			4:57
6.	"Pinnacle of Bedlam"			3:42
7.	"My Demise"		Marchais	4:03
8.	"Inversion"			3:50
9.	"Rapture of Revocation"	Frank Mullen	Boyer; Marchais; Hobbs	3:49
10.	"Beginning of Sorrow" (re-recorded from Breeding the Spawn)	Mike Smith (credited: Suffocation)	Doug Cerrito (credited: Suffocation)	4:32
Total length:				38:17

== Personnel ==
=== Suffocation ===
- Frank Mullen – vocals
- Terrance Hobbs – lead guitar
- Guy Marchais – rhythm guitar
- Derek Boyer – bass
- Dave Culross – drums

=== Guest musicians ===
- Mike Smith - drums on track 10

=== Production ===
- Joe Cincotta – engineering, production
- Chris "Zeuss" Harris – mixing, mastering
