= Hymns from the Apocrypha =

Studio album by Suffocation
- Released: November 3, 2023
- Studio: InLine Studio, Long Island, New York, United States
- Genre: Brutal death metal, technical death metal
- Length: 41:22
- Label: Nuclear Blast
- Producer: Christian Donaldson

Suffocation chronology
...Of the Dark Light (2017)	Hymns from the Apocrypha (2023)

Singles from Hymns from the Apocrypha
- 1. "Seraphim Enslavement" Released: September 12, 2023; 2. "Perpetual Deception" Released: October 5, 2023; 3. "Delusions of Mortality" Released: November 3, 2023

Hymns from the Apocrypha is the ninth studio album by American death metal band Suffocation, released on November 3, 2023, via Nuclear Blast. It is the band's final album with Eric Morotti on drums and the first album to feature vocalist Ricky Myers, who is also the drummer for death metal band Disgorge.

Professional ratings
Review scores
Source	Rating
Blabbermouth.net	8.5/10
Distorted Sound	8/10
Metal Forces	8.5/10
Metal.de	7/10
Metal Storm	6.7/10
MetalSucks	4/5 stars
Rock Hard	8/10

== Track listing ==
No.	Title	Lyrics	Music	Length
1.	"Hymns from the Apocrypha"	Ricky Myers	Terrance Hobbs, Derek Boyer	5:44
2.	"Perpetual Deception"	Myers	Charlie Errigo	4:15
3.	"Dim Veil of Obscurity"	Myers	Hobbs, Errigo	4:23
4.	"Immortal Execration"	Myers	Errigo	4:25
5.	"Seraphim Enslavement"	Myers, Boyer	Hobbs, Boyer, Errigo	4:26
6.	"Descendants"	Myers	Hobbs, Boyer, Errigo	4:20
7.	"Embrace the Suffering"	Myers	Hobbs	4:33
8.	"Delusions of Mortality"	Myers	Hobbs, Errigo	3:49
9.	"Ignorant Deprivation" (re-recorded from Breeding the Spawn)	Mike Smith	Hobbs	5:27
Total length:				41:22

== Personnel ==
Suffocation

- Ricky Myers – vocals (tracks 1–8)
- Terrance Hobbs – lead guitar
- Charlie Errigo – rhythm guitar
- Derek Boyer – bass
- Eric Morotti – drums

Additional musicians

- Frank Mullen – vocals (track 9)

Production

- Christian Donaldson – production, mixing, mastering
- Dom Grimard – mixing assistant
- Giannis Nakos – artwork, layout

== Charts ==
Chart performance for Hymns from the Apocrypha
Chart (2023)	Peak position
Polish Albums (ZPAV)	81
Swiss Albums (Schweizer Hitparade)	75
