= Infecting the Crypts =

Song by Suffocation

from the album Human Waste and Effigy of the Forgotten
- Studio: Morrisound Recording
- Genre: Brutal death metal
- Label: Roadrunner Records
- Composer: Suffocation
- Producer: Scott Burns

"Infecting the Crypts" is a 1991 song by American death metal band Suffocation, first appearing on the band's debut EP Human Waste, and later on their debut studio album Effigy of the Forgotten. It was one of the first Suffocation songs ever written, according to guitarist Terrance Hobbs.

According to Crypta bassist Fernanda Lira, the song contains "a lot of progressions and just relentless notes." She also noted that the song incorporates the string skipping technique frequently.

A video was made for the track in 2021.
