= Blood Oath (album) =

- Cover art by Jon Zig

Studio album by Suffocation
- Released: July 3, 2009
- Recorded: January 31, 2009
- Genre: Technical death metal
- Length: 41:10
- Label: Nuclear Blast
- Producer: Suffocation and Joe Cincotta

Suffocation chronology
The Best of Suffocation (2008)	Blood Oath (2009)	Pinnacle of Bedlam (2013)

Professional ratings
Review scores
Source	Rating
Allmusic	3.5/5 stars
Blabbermouth	8/10
Pitchfork Media	7.7/10
Time Out New York	4/5 stars

Blood Oath is the sixth studio album by American death metal band Suffocation. The band began recording in-studio on January 31 with Joe Cincotta (who worked on the band's last two releases). The follow-up to 2006's self-titled record Suffocation was mixed by Zack Ohren and the cover artwork was once again designed by Jon Zig. It is the band's last album to feature drummer Mike Smith in full. The track "Marital Decimation" is a re-recording of a track of the same name from the Breeding the Spawn album.

The album sold 3,600 copies in the United States in its first week of release to debut at position 135 on the Billboard 200, Suffocation's first entry in the Billboard charts.

== Track listing ==
No.	Title	Length
1.	"Blood Oath"	3:56
2.	"Dismal Dream"	3:18
3.	"Pray for Forgiveness"	3:41
4.	"Images of Purgatory"	3:28
5.	"Cataclysmic Purification"	4:55
6.	"Mental Hemorrhage"	3:56
7.	"Come Hell or High Priest"	4:08
8.	"Undeserving"	4:11
9.	"Provoking the Disturbed"	5:20
10.	"Marital Decimation" (Re-recorded from Breeding the Spawn)	4:17
Total length:		41:10

North America Deluxe edition
No.	Title	Length
11.	"Pray for Forgiveness" (Instrumental version)	3:39
12.	"Dismal Dream" (Rough mix unmastered)	3:15

iTunes Deluxe
No.	Title	Length
11.	"Undeserving" (Rough mix unmastered)	3:39
12.	"Marital Decimation" (Instrumental version)	3:15

However there is some sort of mistake on digital edition. Cause these tracks are actually "Pray for Forgiveness" instrumental, and "Dismal Dream" rough mix version respectively.

Limited Edition Blood Red Mail Order Deluxe
No.	Title	Length
11.	"Blood Oath" (Instrumental version)	3:56
12.	"Cataclysmic Purification" (Rough mix unmastered)	4:52

== Release history ==
Region	Date
Europe	July 3, 2009
U.S.	July 14, 2009
Canada	July 24, 2009

== Personnel ==
Suffocation

- Frank Mullen – vocals
- Terrance Hobbs – lead guitar
- Guy Marchais – rhythm guitar
- Derek Boyer – bass
- Mike Smith – drums

Production

- Zack Ohren – mixing
- Joe Cincotta – engineering
- John Scrip – mastering
