= Dan Seagrave =

Visual artist

Dan Seagrave (born 1970) is a visual artist. He has created the album cover artwork for several extreme metal albums, including Suffocation's Effigy of the Forgotten (1991), Morbid Angel's Altars of Madness (1989), and Dismember's Like an Ever Flowing Stream (1991).

Seagrave has also been heavily featured in the collectible card game Sorcery: Contested Realm, including limited foil editions of selected works.

== Work ==
List of albums featuring Dan Seagrave's art:

=== A ===
- Altars of Madness
- ...And Time Begins
- Axis Mundi

=== B ===
- Breeding the Spawn

=== C ===
- Celestial Completion
- Clandestine
- Considered Dead
- Crawl

=== D ===
- Dark Recollections
- Dead Throne
- Diminishing Between Worlds

=== E ===
- Effigy of the Forgotten
- The Erosion of Sanity

=== G ===
- Gateways to Annihilation
- The God That Never Was

=== I ===
- I Am
- Imperial Doom
- Imperium Delirium

=== K ===
- The Key

=== L ===
- Left Hand Path
- Like an Ever Flowing Stream

=== M ===
- Mind Reflections

=== P ===
- Penetralia
- Polarity

=== R ===
- Retribution

=== S ===
- Souls to Deny
- The Spectral Sorrows
- Spheres
- Stillborn

=== T ===
- The Ten Commandments
- Terminate Damnation
- Testimony of the Ancients
- The Triptych

=== U ===
- The Ultimate Incantation
- The Unknown
- Unleash the Carnivore

=== W ===
- Waking into Nightmares
- Where Ironcrosses Grow
- With Roots Above and Branches Below
- The World Is a Thorn
- Worlds Torn Asunder
