= Frank Mullen =

American death metal vocalist

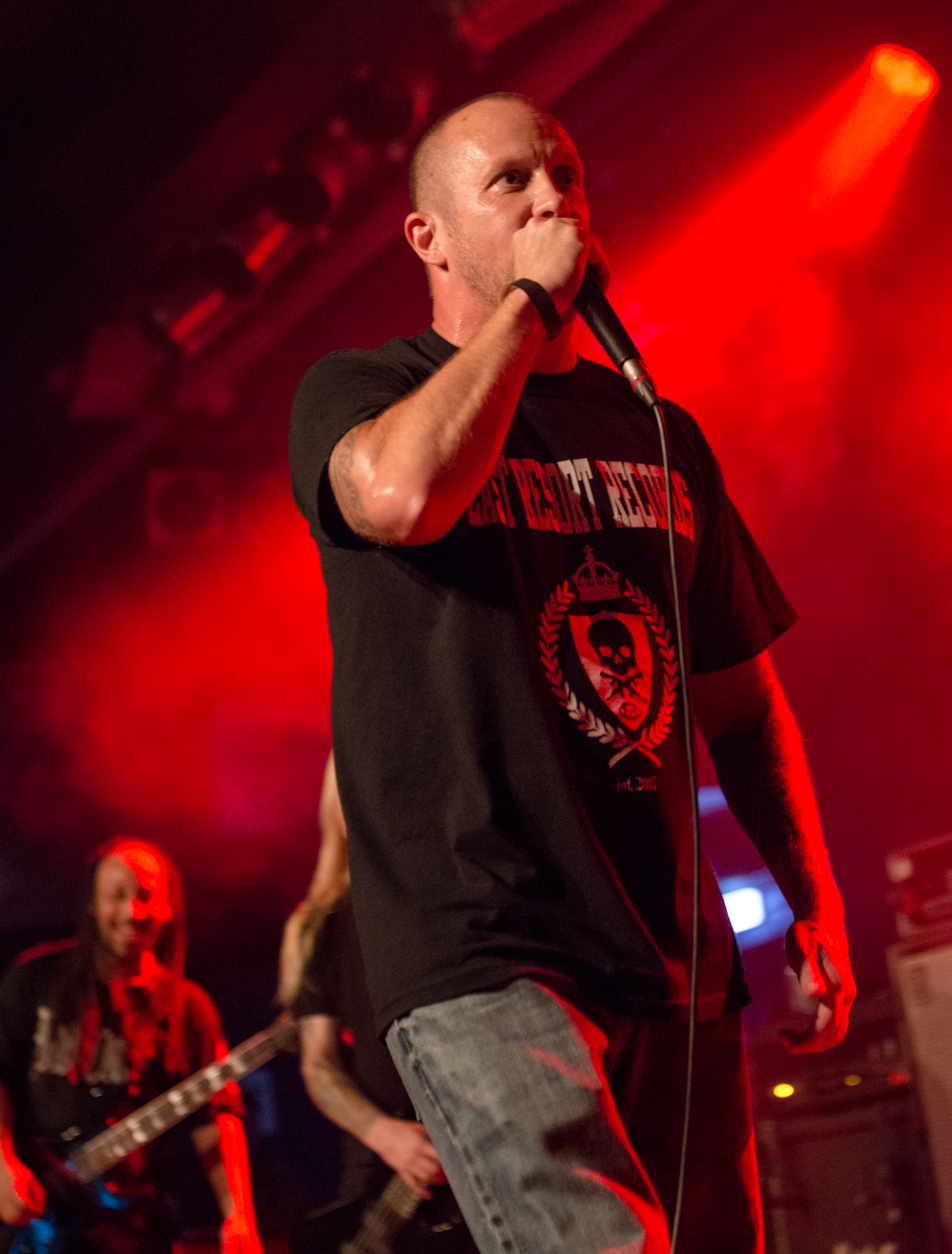
- Mullen at the 2014 Free & Easy Festival

Background information
- Born: Francis P. Mull Eugene Mullen; January 2, 1970 (age 56)
- Genres: Brutal death metal, technical death metal
- Occupation: Singer
- Years active: 1988–1998, 2003–2018, 2019
- Formerly of: Suffocation
- Spouse: Natalie Henriquez (m. 2019)

Francis P. Mull Eugene Mullen (born January 2, 1970) is an American retired vocalist, best known as the former frontman for the New York brutal death metal band Suffocation. He is one of the first vocalists to introduce low-pitched growling vocals into the death metal genre. He performed and recorded with the band from 1989 to 2018. With Suffocation, he was noted for his "command of the stage with slice ‘n’ dice hand chop motion and deranged, homicidal rants between songs."

== Early life ==
Mullen was born on January 2, 1970, and grew up in Long Island, New York. He became a fan of metal music from a young age and was initially attracted to albums like Slayer's Hell Awaits and Exodus's Bonded by Blood through their album cover art. He met bandmates Terrance Hobbs and Mike Smith in high school and they formed a metal cover band, Wombrot, in which he initially played bass.

== Career ==
In 1989, Mullen, Hobbs, and Smith formed Suffocation with bassist Josh Barohn and guitarist Doug Cerrito.

Suffocation released the six-song EP Human Waste in 1991. The EP was one of the first records released by Relapse Records. Their first feature-length album Effigy of the Forgotten was released the same year by Roadrunner Records. The album featured Mullen's distinct low-pitched guttural vocals. According to the Long Island Music Hall of Fame, which the band was inducted into in 2012, "Suffocation created a blueprint for death metal with its guttural vocals, downtuned guitar sounds, and fast and complex guitar riffs and drumming."

The band released their second full album Breeding the Spawn in 1993. The album was criticized for "its short length", "its perceived repetition of the predecessor's overall formula" and a "muddy final mix". The band has since re-recorded many of the songs from the album on subsequent albums. In 1995, they released Pierced from Within, "one of Suffocation's strongest albums" according to Rolling Stone. The band recorded an EP, Despise the Sun, in 1998 and released it through their band management company Vulture, though it was not in wide circulation. Despise the Sun featured a different drummer, Dave Culross, who would later again replace Smith in 2012.

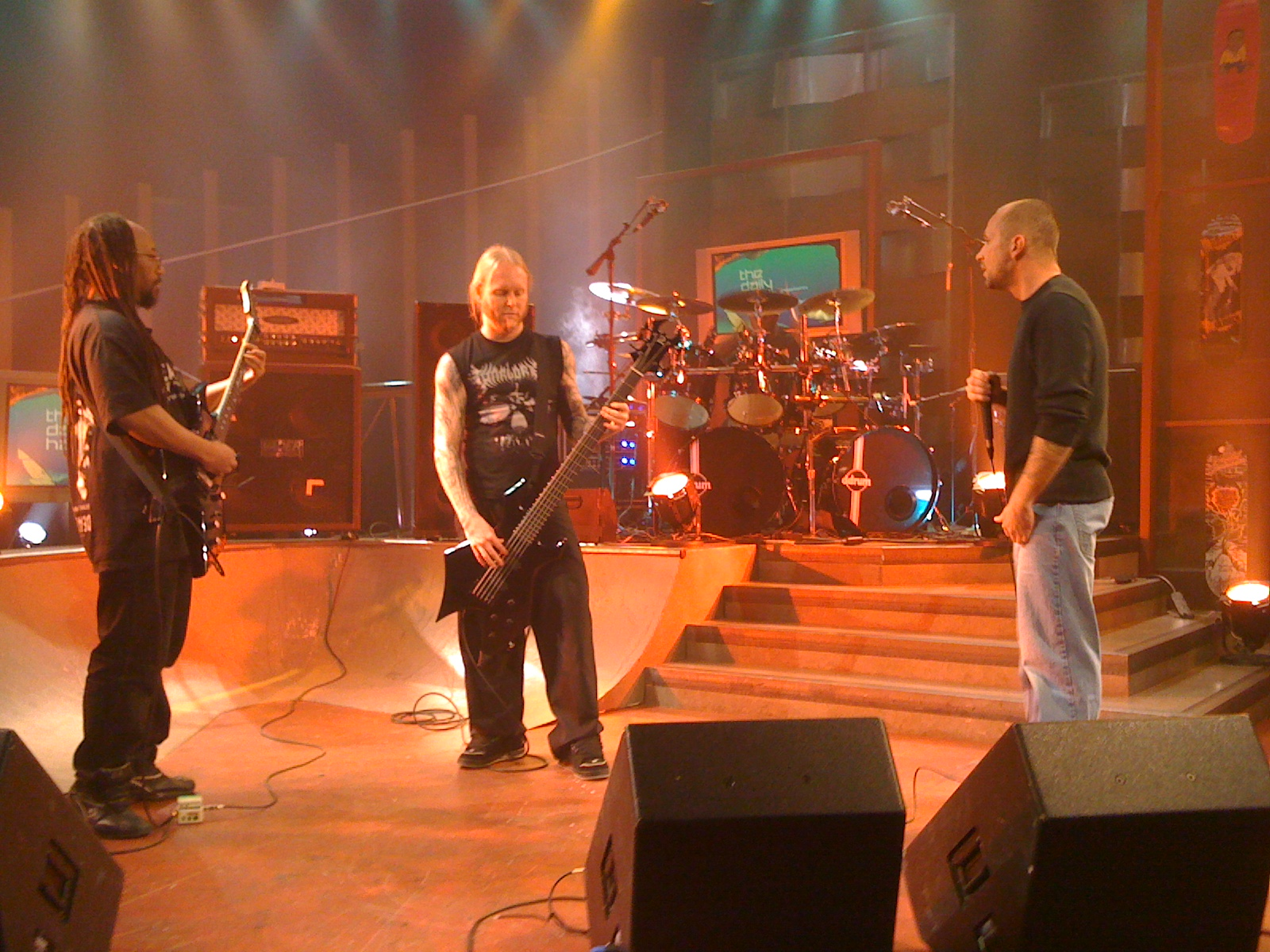
Terrance Hobbs, Derek Boyer, and Mullen in 2010

Suffocation subsequently broke up and did not reunite until 2002; that year, Relapse Records re-released Despise the Sun. The newly re-established band included Mullen, Hobbs, Smith and Barohn, with returning member Guy Marchais, previously with the bands Pyrexia and Internal Bleeding. In April 2004, the band released Souls to Deny before switching bassists to Derek Boyer from the band Decrepit Birth. They entered a period of heavy touring before releasing the self-titled album Suffocation in September 2006.

In 2009, Blood Oath was released with the record label Nuclear Blast. Mullen's brutal guttural growls were particularly noted on the song "Come Hell or High Priest". Pitchfork said of Mullen's vocals, while "he spews tales of madness, megalomania, and paranoia", his "growls are surprisingly understandable".

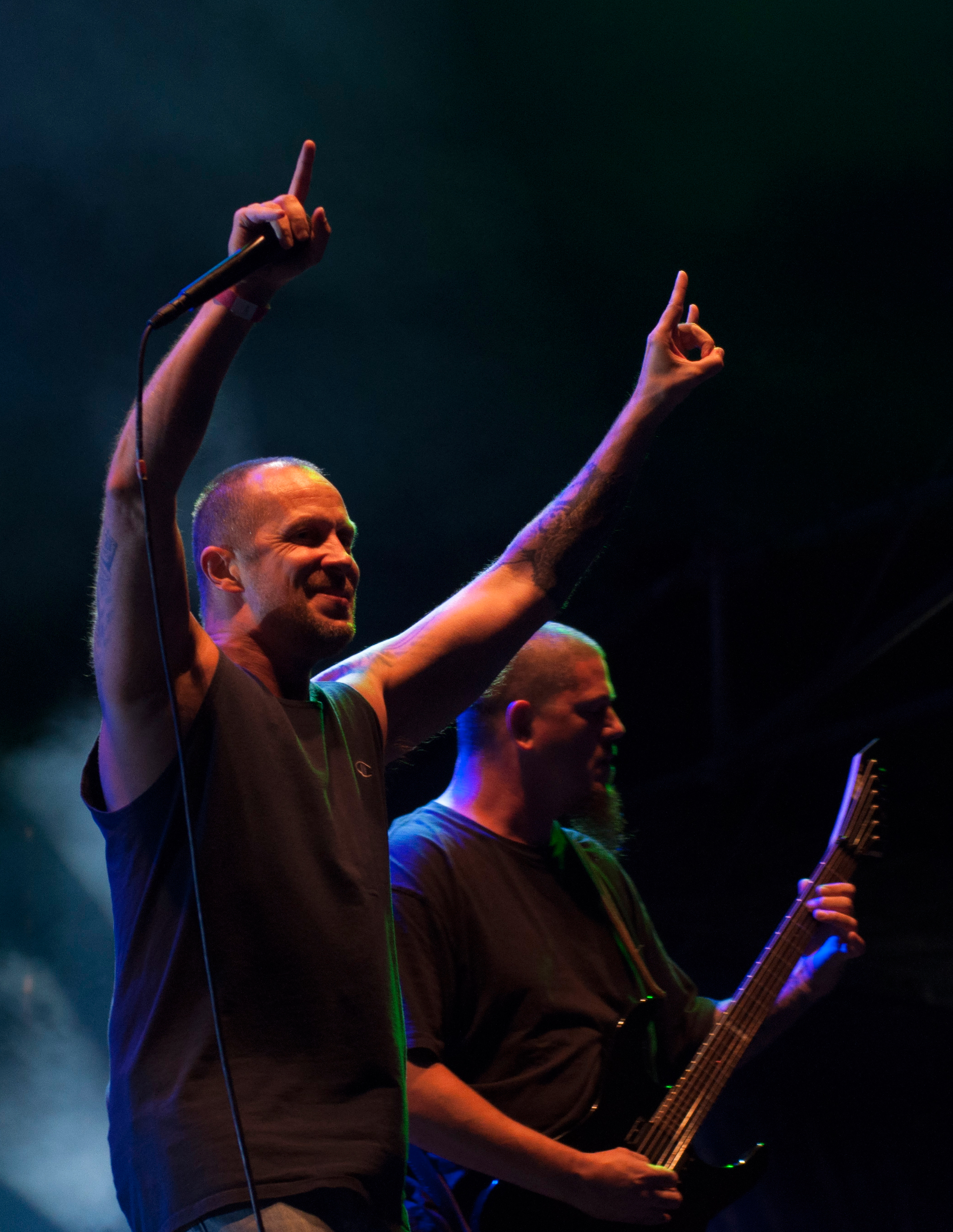
Mullen and Guy Marchais in 2014

After the release of the 2013 album Pinnacle of Bedlam, Mullen announced that he would retire from full-time touring from the band. Pinnacle of Bedlam saw the return of drummer Culross to the band since his previous appearance on Despise the Sun. Mullen and Hobbs became the only remaining original members of the band after the departure of Smith in 2012, and were joined on the band's 2017 album, ...Of the Dark Light, with guitarist Charlie Errigo, bassist Derek Boyer and drummer Eric Morotti.

Mullen retired from his musical career after a final tour with Suffocation, dubbed the Farewell Frank Tour. He made his final U.S. appearance as the lead vocalist for the band in their performance at Nightclub Reverb in Reading, Pennsylvania on November 17, 2018. Mullen's performance featured his signature stage move, the death chop, from which the tour got its tagline, Death Chopping North America. He was succeeded as lead vocalist for Suffocation by Rick Myers, who had filled in for him on several occasions. Mullen later reprised his role for the band's Japanese tour in 2019 before again relinquishing the position to Myers.

== Artistry ==
According to Loudwire, "[Mullen] has an unrepentant, one-dimensional approach to his vocal attack, never once veering from his trench-digging gutturals. He was among the first to implement the ultra-low style, aided by blocking off some of the mic ports in the early days to help muffle and muddy his sound."

== Personal life ==
Mullen enjoys listening to various types of music. When asked what he listened to, he said, "I don't know, I mean I listen to a little bit of everything. I'm a big fan of like Stevie Ray Vaughan, Run-DMC, old hard rock, The Who, The Doors, Janet Jackson, Zeppelin."

Mullen is an atheist; he has said "I don't believe in [one or the other religion]. So my religious views are on, I guess, an atheist point."

He married Natalie Henriquez in July 2019. At their wedding, he sang "Entrails of You", a "love song" from Suffocation's 2006 self-titled album. He shared a video of the performance on his Facebook fan page that drew more than 120,000 views.
