= Breeding the Spawn =

1993 studio album by band Suffocation

Studio album by Suffocation
- Released: May 18, 1993
- Recorded: 1992
- Studio: Noise Lab (West Islip, New York)
- Genre: Technical death metal; brutal death metal
- Length: 35:58
- Label: Roadrunner
- Producer: Paul Bagin; Suffocation

Suffocation chronology
| Effigy of the Forgotten (1991) | Breeding the Spawn (1993) | Pierced from Within (1995) |

Breeding the Spawn is the second studio album by American death metal band Suffocation, released in May 1993 through Roadrunner Records. It was the band's first album with bassist Chris Richards, and their last to feature drummer Mike Smith for over a decade, until Souls to Deny (2004). Building off of the sound of Suffocation's debut album Effigy of the Forgotten (1991), it features more technical songwriting incorporating melodic and dynamic arrangements. The album was produced by Suffocation and Paul Bagin at Noise Lab in West Islip, New York. Suffocation originally planned to record the album in Florida with Effigy of the Forgotten producer Scott Burns, but were prevented from doing so by financial constraints and Roadrunner Records themselves, whose head of A&R, Monte Conner, wanted the band to return to the raw sound of their debut EP Human Waste (1991).

Breeding the Spawn received mixed reviews from critics, with much of the criticism addressed at its poor production. Roadrunner later apologized for this and allowed Suffocation to work with Burns again on their third album Pierced from Within (1995), which included a re-recording of the album's title track. Since then, the band have included re-recordings of Breeding the Spawn's songs on their later albums.

== Music, writing and recording ==
An album that is considered death metal, "as technical as it is brutal", Breeding the Spawn has been described as building off of the sound of Suffocation's debut album Effigy of the Forgotten (1991), featuring more technical songwriting incorporating melodic and dynamic arrangements. The album was the band's first with bassist Chris Richards, whom described to Kerrang! as having "much more of a musical ear to help make [Suffocation's] rhythms sound different. He's like the final piece to the puzzle."

Suffocation began pre-production on Breeding the Spawn in Long Island with Effigy of the Forgotten producer Scott Burns in late 1992. Burns expected the band to record the album down in Florida after a few months, but to his and the band's dismay, were prevented from doing so by Roadrunner Records at the behest of Monte Conner, the label's head of A&R. Conner said that he was "burnt on Scott" and believed that Suffocation could produce "an even better version" of their debut EP Human Waste (1991) without him: "I was looking for that sound [...] natural and not with the typewriter kicks Scott was known for." Similarly, vocalist Frank Mullen and drummer Mike Smith both claimed that Roadrunner wanted the band to record without Burns as he was too popular. Hobbs said that the band were unable to fly down to Florida due to financial constraints, and so opted to "record [the album] at home".

Suffocation attempted to get producer Colin Richardson on board, but he turned them down as they were "too heavy", according to Mullen. Ultimately, Suffocation recorded Breeding the Spawn with producer Paul Bagin at Noise Lab in West Islip, New York—whom they had both used previously for the Human Waste EP. Hobbs said that the album's production was marred by various arguments and inner turmoil within Suffocation, which he felt "came through in the record", and the fact that its engineer was unfamiliar with the band's style of music. Mullen described the production as an "absolute disaster", noting how Smith's drum tracks were recorded: "Mike did drums one day, and then they told him to come back another day, and it was miked up differently. We were just shocked and devastated." Smith's unhappiness with Breeding the Spawn and Roadrunner's perceived lack of support for Suffocation led him to quit the band in 1994; he would return upon their reformation in 2002.

In a 2021 interview with Decibel, Hobbs remarked of the album cover: "I think you can see something is wrong in the band [...]. I’m not a big fan of that cover. We were having a hard time in the studio up here. The band wasn’t doing well. That cover is a reflection of how bad things were for us. The cover is a scar. The production wasn’t the greatest, especially considering how good the music was."

== Release and reception ==
Professional ratings
Review scores
| Source | Rating |
|---|---|
| AllMusic | 3/5 stars |
| Collector's Guide to Heavy Metal | 5/10 |
| The Encyclopedia of Popular Music | 3/5 stars |
| Kerrang! | 3/5 stars |
| Metal Hammer | 4/5 |
| Metal Storm | 8.8/10 |
| Rock Hard | 5/10 |

Breeding the Spawn was first released in May 1993, and in the United States on June 1, 1993. Following its release, Suffocation toured North America with Vader and Dismember from June 11 to 27, 1993.

Breeding the Spawn received mixed reviews from critics, with much of the criticism addressed at its poor production. In 2017, the album topped Decibel's list of the "Top 5 Death Metal Albums Marred by Terrible Production", who described its "twisted, obscenely technical songwriting" as "barely audible in the morass of Paul Bagin's production." Richard Street-Jammer of Invisible Oranges referred to the album as "a fucking tragedy" due to its recording, which he described as "so bad that it's nearly lo-fi", and said he was unable to determine the quality of its songs based on the original album. Mörat of Kerrang! was more positive of the album's sound, feeling that its "back to basics" approach helped Suffocation lose the novelty of sounding "like yet another Scott Burns Morri-bloody-sound Studios band" as they had on Effigy of the Forgotten.

AllMusic reviewer Eduardo Rivadavia felt that the album's production "definitely served to dampen the flesh-piercing capacity of otherwise razor sharp onslaughts such as 'Beginning of Sorrow,' 'Anomalistic Offerings' and the title track, while rendering secondary tracks like 'Marital Decimation' and 'Ornaments of Decrepancy' into so much death metal mush." Despite this, he considered Suffocation's instrumental and vocal performances to be "as expected" and recommended the album to the band's "die-hard fans". The Quietus similarly noted in 2017 that the album was testament to how "Suffocation fanatics are willing to overlook dodgy production if the songs are good enough". In their 2023 retrospective review, Metal Storm claimed that Breeding the Spawn was "The blueprint that many latter-day tech death bands would borrow from" and "an overlooked part of the trifecta that built the reputation of Suffocation." Canadian journalist Martin Popoff gave the album a mixed review, claiming that Pantera was "actually heavier than far-flung death [sic] on half a dozen different scales."

== Aftermath ==
Suffocation "Breeding the Spawn" (1993/1995)
Comparison of the original recording of the title track from Breeding the Spawn (1993), and the re-recorded version from Pierced from Within (1995), respectively.

Roadrunner apologized to Suffocation for the production of Breeding the Spawn, which Conner later referred to as a "mistake", and allowed the band to work with whoever they wanted to for their third album Pierced from Within (1995). According to Mullen, "We [Suffocation] said, 'We want to go back to Scott Burns.' That's what we wanted for Breeding. There was no way in hell we were thinking, 'Oh yes, we're not going to go to Scott. We're going to some studio in Long Island'." Burns felt that the production of Breeding the Spawn was "shit", but did not hold a grudge with either Suffocation of Conner as "[the band] was doing what their record company told them; Monte was looking out for the band's best interests."

On Pierced from Within, Suffocation decided to re-record Breeding the Spawn's title track so the song could be presented as the band originally intended. The band has continued to re-record most of the album's songs on their later albums. "Prelude to Repulsion" and "Anomalistic Offerings" were re-recorded on Suffocation (2006), with the latter found on the Japanese version of the album; "Marital Decimation" on Blood Oath (2009); "Beginning of Sorrow" on Pinnacle of Bedlam (2013); "Epitaph of the Credulous" on ...Of the Dark Light (2017); and "Ignorant Deprivation" on Hymns from the Apocrypha (2023). As of 2023, "Ornaments Of Discrepancy" remains the sole track from Breeding the Spawn to have not been re-recorded on any of Suffocation's later albums. In a 2006 interview, Smith said that Suffocation would only re-record Breeding the Spawn in full if the original lineup was involved, as it would take too long for the band to teach its songs to its newer members and "prevent us from moving forward". "Even though they'll all sound different", Hobbs reasoned in a 2013 interview, "it'll all sound better than that record."

== Track listing ==
| No. | Title | Lyrics | Music | Length |
|---|---|---|---|---|
| 1. | "Beginning of Sorrow" | Mike Smith | Doug Cerrito | 4:17 |
| 2. | "Breeding the Spawn" | Cerrito | Cerrito | 4:47 |
| 3. | "Epitaph of the Credulous" | Frank Mullen | Cerrito; Terrance Hobbs | 3:45 |
| 4. | "Marital Decimation" | Mullen | Hobbs | 4:06 |
| 5. | "Prelude to Repulsion" | Mullen | Cerrito | 4:50 |
| 6. | "Anomalistic Offerings" | Mullen | Hobbs | 4:41 |
| 7. | "Ornaments of Decrepancy" | Smith | Hobbs | 4:42 |
| 8. | "Ignorant Deprivation" | Smith | Hobbs | 4:50 |
| Total length: | | | | 35:58 |

== Personnel ==
Adapted from liner notes.

Suffocation
- Frank Mullen – vocals
- Terrance Hobbs – lead guitar
- Doug Cerrito – rhythm guitar
- Chris Richards – bass
- Mike Smith – drums
Production
- Paul Bagin – production, mixing, engineering (at Noise Lab)
- Chris Gehringer – mastering (at The Hit Factory)

Artwork

- Dan Seagrave – cover artwork
- Doug Cerrito – logo
- Kristin Callahan – photography
- Monido Graphics – art direction

== Release history ==
Release history for Breeding the Spawn
| Region | Label | Format | Date | Catalog # | Ref. |
|---|---|---|---|---|---|
| Europe | Roadrunner | CD; CS; LP | May 1993 | RR-9913-2 | |
| United States | Roadrunner | CD; CS | June 1, 1993 | RR-9913-2 | |
| Various | Listenable | LP | March 26, 2021 | POSH333 | |
| Various | Listenable | CD | June 25, 2021 | POSH563 | |
| Various | Music on Vinyl | LP | August 26, 2022 | MOVLP3057 | |
| Various | Listenable | LP; CS | April 28, 2023 | POSH678 | |
| Various | Listenable | LP; CS | April 28, 2023 | POSH679 | |

== Bibliography ==
- Anon. (May 1, 1993). "Mayhem: Record Releases". Kerrang!. No. 441. EMAP. p. 8.
- Anon. (May 24, 1993). "Peddle to the Metal" (PDF). HITS. Vol. 7, no. 343. p. 74 – via worldradiohistory.com.
- Anon. (June 4, 1993). "Hard Tour Guide" (PDF). The Hard Report. No. 328. The Hard Report, Inc. p. 52 – via worldradiohistory.com.
- Fabricus, Jodie (October 23, 1992). "Metal Filings" (PDF). The Hard Report. No. 299. The Hard Report, Inc. p. 54 – via worldradiohistory.com.
- Gehkle, David E. (2023). "1995". The Scott Burns Sessions: A Life in Death Metal 1987–1997. US: Decibel Books. pp. 346–351. ISBN 979-889184521-3.
- Jacey, Phil (May 1993). "Reviews". Metal Hammer. Vol. 8, no. 5. UK: Rock Team Publishing. p. 39. ISSN 0955-1190.
- Larkin, Colin, ed. (2006). "Suffocation". Encyclopedia of Popular Music. Vol. 7 (4th ed.). MUZE. p. 827. ISBN 978-0-19-531373-4.
- Mörat (May 1, 1993). "Rekordz". Kerrang!. No. 441. EMAP. p. 44.
- Popoff, Martin (2007). The Collector's Guide to Heavy Metal: Volume 3: The Nineties. Burlington, Ontario, Canada: Collector's Guide Publishing. p. 428. ISBN 978-1-894959-62-9.
- Sharpe-Young, Garry (2007). "Suffocation". Metal: The Definitive Guide. Jawbone Press. p. 194–195. ISBN 978-1-906002-01-5 – via Internet Archive.
