= ...Of the Dark Light =

Studio album by Suffocation
- Released: June 9, 2017
- Recorded: December 2016
- Studios: Full Force Studios, Long Island, New York, United States
- Genres: Brutal death metal, technical death metal
- Length: 35:17
- Label: Nuclear Blast
- Producers: Suffocation; Joe Cincotta

Suffocation chronology
Pinnacle of Bedlam (2013)	...Of the Dark Light (2017)	Hymns from the Apocrypha (2023)

Singles from ...Of the Dark Light
- 1. "Your Last Breaths" Released: April 13, 2017; 2. "Return to the Abyss" Released: May 12, 2017

...Of the Dark Light is the eighth studio album by American death metal band Suffocation, released on June 9, 2017, via Nuclear Blast. It is the band's first album to feature guitarist Charlie Errigo and drummer Eric Morotti, and their final album to feature original vocalist Frank Mullen. At 35 minutes and 17 seconds, this is the shortest Suffocation album.

== Reception ==
Professional ratings
Aggregate scores
Source	Rating
Metacritic	72/100
Review scores
Source	Rating
Blabbermouth.net	8.5/10
Exclaim!	8/10
Metal.de	8/10
Metal Hammer	3/5 stars
Metal Storm	6.4/10
MetalSucks	3.5/5 stars
Paste	6.7/10
Pitchfork	7.0/10
Rock Hard	9/10
Sputnikmusic	2.0/5

...Of the Dark Light received generally favorable views from critics. At Metacritic (a review aggregator site which assigns a normalized rating out of 100 from music critics), based on 4 critics, the album has received a score of 72/100, which indicates "generally favorable" reviews.

== Track listing ==
No.	Title	Lyrics	Music	Length
1.	"Clarity Through Deprivation"	Derek Boyer	Terrance Hobbs	4:04
2.	"The Warmth Within the Dark"	Boyer	Hobbs	3:39
3.	"Your Last Breaths"	Boyer	Hobbs	4:36
4.	"Return to the Abyss"	Hobbs; Boyer	Hobbs	3:56
5.	"The Violation"	Boyer	Hobbs	3:41
6.	"...Of the Dark Light"	Boyer	Hobbs; Boyer	3:41
7.	"Some Things Should Be Left Alone"	Frank Mullen	Hobbs; Boyer	3:23
8.	"Caught Between Two Worlds"	Boyer	Hobbs; Boyer	4:19
9.	"Epitaph of the Credulous" (re-recorded from Breeding the Spawn)	Mullen (credited: Suffocation)	Hobbs; Doug Cerrito; (credited: Suffocation)	3:58
Total length:				35:17

== Personnel ==
Credits are adapted from the album's liner notes.

Suffocation

- Frank Mullen – vocals
- Terrance Hobbs – lead guitar
- Charlie Errigo – rhythm guitar
- Derek Boyer – bass
- Eric Morotti – drums

Additional musicians

- Kevin Muller – backing vocals

Production

- Joe Cincotta – production, engineering
- Chris "Zeuss" Harris – mixing, mastering
- Colin Marks – artwork, design

== Charts ==
Chart (2017)	Peak position
Belgian Albums (Ultratop Flanders)	167
German Albums (Offizielle Top 100)	80
