= Despise the Sun =

EP by Suffocation
- Released: January 6, 1998
- Recorded: August 1997
- Studio: Cove City Sound (New York City)
- Genres: Brutal death metal, technical death metal
- Length: 16:34
- Label: Vulture (re-release on Relapse)
- Producers: Scott Burns, Suffocation

Suffocation chronology
Pierced from Within (1995)	Despise the Sun (1998)	Souls to Deny (2004)

Professional ratings
Review scores
Source	Rating
AllMusic	4/5 stars
Chronicles of Chaos	9/10
The Encyclopedia of Popular Music	3/5 stars

Despise the Sun is an EP by American death metal band Suffocation, released on January 6, 1998. It was the last recording before Suffocation's breakup (and subsequent reformation in 2003), and the last to feature guitarist Doug Cerrito and bassist Chris Richards. It was the final album produced by Scott Burns, who had worked on Effigy of the Forgotten (1991) and Pierced from Within (1995), as he retired from the music industry after its recording in 1997. The EP was reissued on April 30, 2002 through Relapse Records.

The last track, "Catatonia", originally appeared on the Human Waste EP.

The sample placed at the beginning of "Funeral Inception" is from Kevin Spacey, said in the 1995 film The Usual Suspects.

== Track listing ==
No.	Title	Lyrics	Music	Length
1.	"Funeral Inception"	Doug Cerrito	Cerrito	3:57
2.	"Devoid of Truth"	Cerrito	Dave Culross, Cerrito, Terrance Hobbs	2:31
3.	"Despise the Sun"	Cerrito	Cerrito, Hobbs	3:21
4.	"Bloodchurn"	Frank Mullen	Culross, Cerrito, Hobbs	2:43
5.	"Catatonia"	Suffocation	Suffocation	3:59
Total length:				16:34

== Personnel ==
Suffocation

- Frank Mullen - vocals
- Terrance Hobbs - lead guitar
- Doug Cerrito - rhythm guitar
- Chris Richards - bass
- Dave Culross - drums

Production

- Doug Cerrito - design, layout, logo, cover concept
- Brian Harding - engineering assistant
- Steve Heritage - mixing assistant, mastering assistant
- Robert Weigel - band photography
- Dave Culross - cover concept
- Jason Fligman - executive producer
- Travis Smith - artwork, design, layout, cover concept
- Scott Burns - producer, engineering, mixing, mastering
