= Death Rap =

Studio album by Necro
- Released: September 11, 2007
- Recorded: 2006–07
- Genres: Horrorcore; rap metal
- Length: 37:12
- Label: Psycho+Logical-Records
- Producer: Necro

Necro chronology
The Sexorcist (2005)	Death Rap (2007)	DIE! (2010)

Professional ratings
Review scores
Source	Rating
Laut.de	4/5 stars
Now	3/5 Ns
The Observer	4/5 stars
RapReviews	6.5/10
Stylus	D+

Death Rap is the fifth solo studio album by American rapper and record producer Necro. It was released on September 11, 2007 via Psycho+Logical-Records. It was the first studio album Necro released since signing with Koch Distribution in July 2007. As the title suggests, the album is Necro's return to emphasis on gore and violence, rather than sex, such as in his 2005 album The Sexorcist. Pre-orders of the album were shipped with a limited edition bonus DVD that contained an unreleased music video and six live performances. Like his last album, Necro chose not to place a parental advisory sticker on the cover.

Featured guest vocalists on the album include Harley Flanagan of Cro-Mags, Brian Fair of Shadows Fall, Adam Jackson of Twelve Tribes, Mr. Hyde, Necro's brother Ill Bill, and Ray Alder of Fates Warning. Featured guest instrumentalists on the album include Mark Morton of Lamb of God, Mike Smith of Suffocation, Steve DiGiorgio, formerly of Death, Scott Ian of Anthrax and Dave Ellefson of Megadeth.

== Background information ==
On July 15, 2007, SMNnews.com posted that the album would be released on September 11, 2007 and is called Death Rap. They also announced the track listing.

On July 19, 2007, Necro's MySpace profile was updated to feature a new song featured on Death Rap, "Some Get Back (Revenge)", along with the album's cover art.

On July 20, 2007, Necro revealed on his official forum that he planned on releasing "Suffocated to Death by God's Shadow", a track from the album, on iTunes before the album was released. This ultimately did not happen.

On September 21, 2007, Necro released on his official YouTube page the music video for "Mutilate the Beat", the sixth track from Death Rap. The video was directed by Necro and David Brodsky.

== Track listing ==
No.	Title	Writer(s)	Length
1.	"Creepy Crawl"	Ron Braunstein	2:05
2.	"No Remorse"	R. Braunstein	3:30
3.	"Some Get Back (Revenge)"	R. Braunstein	2:18
4.	"Belligerent Gangsters" (featuring Harley Flanagan)	R. Braunstein	2:31
5.	"Suffocated to Death by God's Shadow" (featuring Mike Smith, Steve Di Giorgio, Mark Morton and Brian Fair)	R. Braunstein; Mike Smith; Steve Di Giorgio; Mark Morton	4:10
6.	"Mutilate the Beat"	R. Braunstein	2:10
7.	"Keep on Driving"	R. Braunstein	4:47
8.	"Technician of Execution"	R. Braunstein	2:22
9.	"Keeping It Real" (featuring Adam Jackson)	R. Braunstein	3:23
10.	"Exploitation" (featuring Mr. Hyde)	R. Braunstein; Chris Catenacci	1:28
11.	"As Deadly as Can Be" (featuring Ill Bill)	R. Braunstein; William Braunstein	1:58
12.	"Evil Rules" (featuring Scott Ian, David Ellefson and Ray Alder)	R. Braunstein; Scott Ian	2:09
13.	"Forensic Pathology"	R. Braunstein	1:23
14.	"Portrait of a Death Rapper"	R. Braunstein	2:58
Total length:			37:12

=== Bonus DVD ===
1. "The Pre-Fix for Death" (Previously unreleased music video)
2. "Beautiful Music for You to Die to" (Live at the Scala in London, UK)
3. Necro's Chant (Live in Baltimore)
4. "The Dispensation of Life and Death" (Live)
5. Necro's verse (Live, featuring Igor Cavalera of Sepultura)
6. "Kill That Shit" (Live)
7. "Adam 'Whit3y' Jackson the gamer" (Live)

== Personnel ==
- Ron "Necro" Braunstein – vocals, rhythm guitar and keyboards (track 5), guitars and bass (track 9), producer, mixing
- Harley Flanagan – vocals (track 4)
- Mike Smith – drums (track 5)
- Steve DiGiorgio – bass (track 5)
- Mark Morton – guitar (track 5)
- Brian Fair – vocals (track 5)
- Elliott Thomas – keyboards (track 9), mixing, engineering
- Adam Jackson – vocals (track 9)
- Christopher "Mr. Hyde" Catenacci – vocals (track 10)
- William "Ill Bill" Braunstein – vocals (track 11)
- Scott Ian – rhythm and lead guitar (track 12)
- Dave Ellefson – bass (track 12)
- Ray Alder – vocals (track 12)
- Charles De Montebello – mastering
- Mark Riddick – design, illustration

== Charts ==
Chart (2007)	Peak position
US Independent Albums (Billboard)	43
US Heatseekers Albums (Billboard)	13
