= Pierced from Within =

Studio album by Suffocation
- Released: May 1, 1995 (USA); May 23, 1995 (EU)
- Studio: Morrisound Recording in Tampa, Florida
- Genres: Brutal death metal; technical death metal
- Length: 45:31
- Label: Roadrunner
- Producer: Scott Burns

Suffocation chronology
| Breeding the Spawn (1993) | Pierced from Within (1995) | Despise the Sun (1998) |

Pierced from Within is the third album by the death metal band Suffocation, released in 1995. Released after their heavily criticized sophomore album Breeding the Spawn, the album received far greater praise than that album, and is regarded as one of Suffocation's best albums. At 45 minutes and 31 seconds, Pierced from Within is the band’s longest album to date.

Both this album and Effigy of the Forgotten have been re-released by Roadrunner Records as part of the Two from the Vault series.

== Background and recording ==
Suffocation's previous album, Breeding the Spawn was heavily criticized, particularly for its production and mixing. Originally, the band was due to return to Morrisound and record the album with Scott Burns, but Roadrunner was unwilling to fund the album properly and refused to pay for the studio time, forcing them to record elsewhere. Due to the recording process, drummer Mike Smith left the band after the album's release and was replaced by Doug Bohn.

"Synthetically Revived" is a re-recording of the song of the same name from the Human Waste EP and "Breeding the Spawn" is a re-recording of the title track from the band's previous album.

Before 2013's Pinnacle of Bedlam, this was the only full-length album by Suffocation not to feature Mike Smith as a drummer. It is the band's last album with guitarist Doug Cerrito and bassist Chris Richards, and the only with drummer Doug Bohn.

== Music ==
Pierced from Within has been described as a brutal death metal and technical death metal album. The album's musical style has been described as "fast, intricately technical, immaculately heavy." The album's tracks have been described as "complex, savage riff collages that reveal more of themselves with each listen." The album also boasts noticeably better production than the band's previous album, specifically with louder bass than the previous album that was described as "lacking."

== Artwork ==
The album artwork depicts what Metal Injection calls " a nightmarish scenario tinted dark green with the band's logo in yellow and red overtop." It depicts a person with pikes pierced all over his body in front of a forest. The artwork was originally intended to be colored blue. However, the album was printed incorrectly. The original blue album cover was correctly printed on some of the band's merchandise, such as T-shirts.

== Reception and legacy ==
Professional ratings
Review scores
| Source | Rating |
|---|---|
| AllMusic | 4/5 stars |
| Chronicles of Chaos | 7/10 |
| Collector's Guide to Heavy Metal | 6/10 |
| The Encyclopedia of Popular Music | 3/5 stars |
| Metal Storm | 10/10 |

Pierced From Within has been called Suffocation's "watershed moment", and guitarist Terrance Hobbs has cited the album as his favorite the band has done. Writing for AllMusic, Leslie Mathew would claim the band, "surpasses themselves on Pierced From Within. Fast, intricately technical, immaculately heavy, and well produced, Pierced From Within is an extreme metal landmark, highly recommended for genre newbies and hardcore fans alike."

Loudwire named the album as the greatest album in the brutal death metal genre. Music journalist Eduardio Riveria wrote: "While most metal fans were still just getting used to death metal’s natural brutality, Long Island’s Suffocation were already taking things up a notch and pushing the young genre to new domains. Pretty soon – right around the release of their career-defining third opus, ‘Pierced from Within’ – yet another subgenre description was required, and soon the band and others of their ilk fell into the brutal death metal category."

In 2025, Joe DiVita of Loudwire named the album as the best death metal release of 1995. He wrote: "Even without the technician Mike Smith behind the kit, the New York purveyors of both technical and brutal death metal nearly cleaved the Earth in two with the bulging might of all-timers in the contorting 'Thrones of Blood' and imposing title track."

== Track listing ==
- All songs written by Suffocation except where noted.

| No. | Title | Lyrics | Length |
|---|---|---|---|
| 1. | "Pierced from Within" | | 4:26 |
| 2. | "Thrones of Blood" | | 5:14 |
| 3. | "Depths of Depravity" | | 5:33 |
| 4. | "Suspended in Tribulation" | | 6:31 |
| 5. | "Torn into Enthrallment" | Doug Cerrito, Lee Harrison, Frank Mullen | 5:25 |
| 6. | "The Invoking" | | 4:36 |
| 7. | "Synthetically Revived" (Rerecorded from Human Waste) | | 3:53 |
| 8. | "Brood of Hatred" | | 4:36 |
| 9. | "Breeding the Spawn" (Rerecorded from Breeding the Spawn) | | 5:09 |
| Total length: | | | 45:31 |

== Personnel ==
Suffocation

- Frank Mullen - vocals
- Terrance Hobbs - lead guitar
- Doug Cerrito - rhythm guitar
- Chris Richards - bass
- Doug Bohn - drums

Production

- Produced by Scott Burns & Suffocation
- Engineered and mixed by Scott Burns
- Assistant engineer: Dave Wehner
- Recorded and mixed at Morrisound Recording, Tampa, FL, USA
- Mastered by Mike Fuller at Fullersound, Miami, FL, USA
- Cover art: Hiro Takahashi
