= Suffocation (album) =

- Cover art by Jon Zig

Studio album by Suffocation
- Released: September 19, 2006
- Recorded: May – June 2006 at FullForce Studios
- Genre: Technical death metal
- Length: 44:14
- Label: Relapse
- Producer: Suffocation

Suffocation chronology
| Souls to Deny (2004) | Suffocation (2006) | The Best of Suffocation (2008) |

Professional ratings
Review scores
| Source | Rating |
|---|---|
| Allmusic | 3.5/5 stars |
| Blabbermouth.net | 8.5/10 |
| Brave Words & Bloody Knuckles | 9/10 |
| Collector's Guide to Heavy Metal | 7/10 |

Suffocation is the fifth studio album by American death metal band Suffocation. It was released in 2006 through Relapse Records. This is the first album to feature Derek Boyer as bassist. The song "Prelude to Repulsion" is a re-recording of the track of the same name on Breeding the Spawn.

A music video for "Abomination Reborn" and "Bind Torture Kill" was produced.

== Track listing ==
- All songs written & arranged by Suffocation.

| No. | Title | Length |
|---|---|---|
| 1. | "Oblivion" | 0:40 |
| 2. | "Abomination Reborn" | 3:33 |
| 3. | "Redemption" | 5:24 |
| 4. | "Bind Torture Kill" | 5:44 |
| 5. | "Misconceived" | 3:35 |
| 6. | "Translucent Patterns of Delirium" | 3:31 |
| 7. | "Creed of the Infidel" | 4:23 |
| 8. | "Regret" | 3:51 |
| 9. | "Entrails of You" | 4:21 |
| 10. | "The End of Ends" | 4:14 |
| 11. | "Prelude to Repulsion" (re-recorded from Breeding the Spawn) | 4:58 |
| Total length: | | 44:14 |

Japanese bonus track
| No. | Title | Length |
|---|---|---|
| 12. | "Anomalistic Offerings" (re-recorded from Breeding the Spawn) | 4:38 |
| Total length: | | 48:52 |

== Personnel ==
- Frank Mullen – vocals
- Terrance Hobbs – lead guitar
- Guy Marchais – rhythm guitar
- Derek Boyer – bass
- Mike Smith – drums
