= Polarity (Decrepit Birth album) =

2010 studio album by Decrepit Birth

Studio album by Decrepit Birth
- Released: July 27, 2010
- Genres: Technical death metal, melodic death metal
- Length: 43:15
- Label: Nuclear Blast
- Producers: Zack Ohren, and Matt Sotelo

Decrepit Birth chronology
Diminishing Between Worlds (2008)	Polarity (2010)	Axis Mundi (2017)

Professional ratings
Review scores
Source	Rating
About.com	4.5/5 stars
Allmusic	3.5/5 stars

Polarity is the third studio album by the American death metal band Decrepit Birth, released in 2010.

A music video for the song "The Resonance" was filmed, and is the band's first music video. It was directed by Ann Christin "Anki" Rihm. The artwork for Polarity was made by Dan Seagrave, who also has made the artwork for the band's first two studio albums.

== Track listing ==
1. "(A Departure of the Sun) Ignite the Tesla Coil" – 6:33
2. "Metatron" – 4:13
3. "The Resonance" – 3:42
4. "Polarity" – 4:26
5. "Solar Impulse" – 2:52
6. "Mirroring Dimensions" – 3:36
7. "A Brief Odyssey in Time" – 1:01
8. "The Quickening of Time" – 2:42
9. "Sea of Memories" – 2:25
10. "Symbiosis" – 4:23
11. "Darkness Embrace" – 2:25
12. "See Through Dreams" – 4:28

== Credits ==
=== Personnel ===
- Bill Robinson - vocals
- Matt Sotelo - guitar
- Joel Horner - bass
- KC Howard - drums
- Dan Eggers - guitar solos on "The Quickening of Time", "Symbiosis", and "Polarity"
- Lee Smith - drums on "Sea of Memories", and "Darkness Embrace"
- Ty Oliver - guitar solo on "Solar Impulse"

=== Production ===
- Drum tracking by Zack Ohren at Shark Bite Studios
- All guitar, bass, vocals, and keys tracked at Legion Recording Studio
- Mixing by Zack Ohren and Matt Sotelo at Castle Ultimate Studios
- Mastering by Jamal Ruhe at West West Side Studios
