= Decrepit Birth =

American death metal band

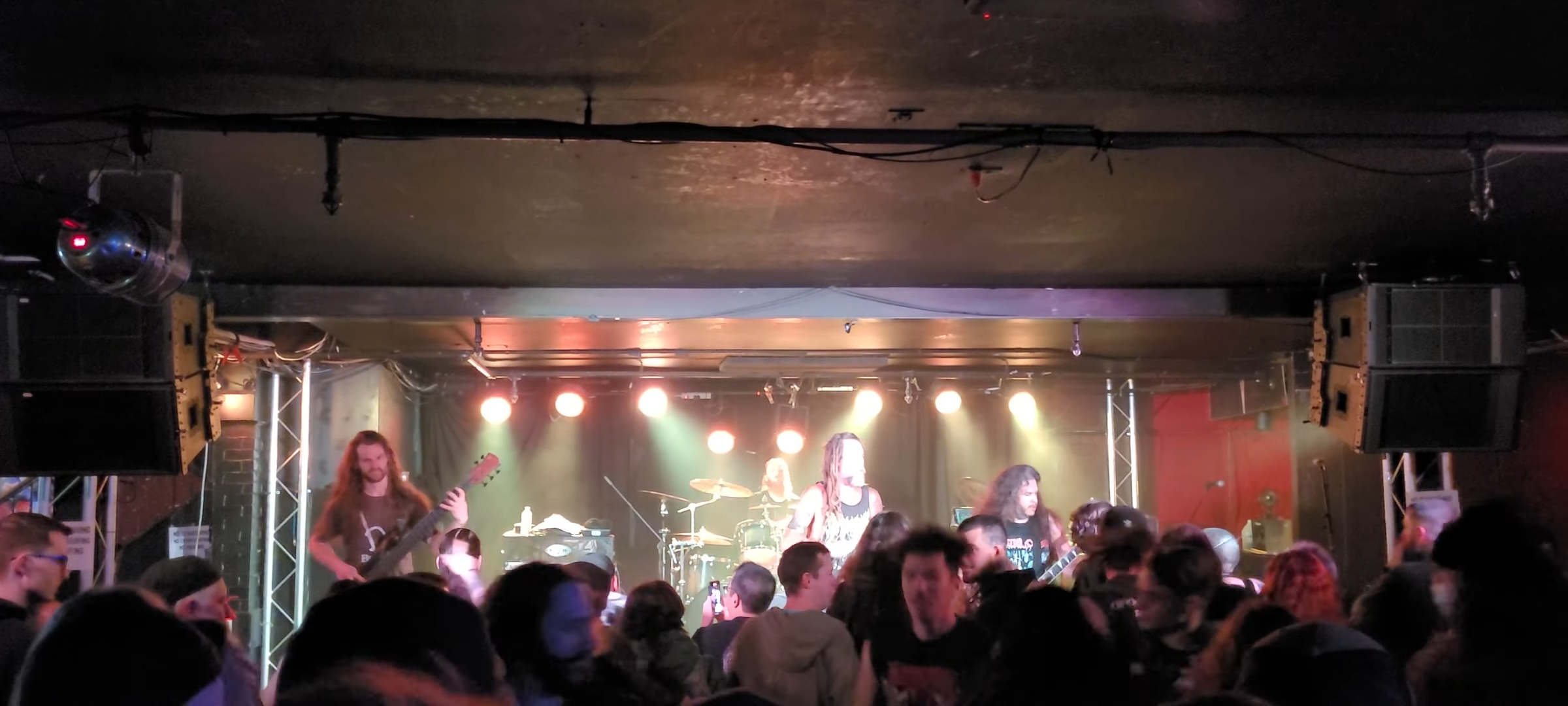
- Decrepit Birth performing in 2023

Background information
- Origin: Santa Cruz, California, U.S.
- Genres: Technical death metal; melodic death metal
- Years active: 1995–present
- Labels: Nuclear Blast, Unique Leader
- Members: Bill Robinson; Matt Sotelo; Gabe Seeber; Chris Ratcliffe
- Past members: KC Howard; Dan Eggers; Mike Turner; Tim Yeung; Risha Eryavec; Sam Paulicelli Jr. Sean Martinez
- Website: www.decreptbirth.net

Decrepit Birth is an American death metal band from Santa Cruz, California formed in 1995. They have released two studio albums through Unique Leader Records and two through Nuclear Blast, and a demo independently. All of their studio albums feature artwork by fantasy artist Dan Seagrave.

In October 2021, it was announced that vocalist Bill Robinson was taking an "extended hiatus" from the band and was being replaced with Mac Smith, who would tour with the band for the foreseeable future. In March 2022, the band announced an upcoming tour in July and that Robinson would return on vocals.

== Band members ==
Current members

- Bill Robinson – lead vocals (2001–present)
- Matt Sotelo – guitars, backing vocals (2001–present)
- Gabe Seeber – drums (2018–present, live 2013–2017)
- Chris Ratcliffe – bass (2025–present)

Current live members

- Matthew Paulazzo – drums (2017–present)

Former members

- Derek Boyer – bass (2001–2003, 2011–2012)
- Tim Yeung – drums (2003)
- KC Howard – drums (2004–2010)
- Risha Eryavec – bass (2004–2007)
- Mike Turner – guitars (2004–2006)
- Joel Horner – bass (2006–2011)
- Dan Eggers – guitars (2008–2010)
- Chase Fraser – guitars (2010–2015)
- Sam Paulicelli, Jr. – drums (2010–2018)
- Sean Martinez – bass (2013–2024)

Live members

- Lee Smith – drums (2010–2011)
- Alex Bent – drums (2013)
- A.J. Lewandowski – bass (2013)
- Mac Smith – vocals (2021–2022)

Timeline

== Discography ==
Studio albums

- ...And Time Begins (2003)
- Diminishing Between Worlds (2008)
- Polarity (2010)
- Axis Mundi (2017)
