= Human Waste =

EP by Suffocation
- Released: May 1, 1991
- Recorded: 1990
- Studios: Recardamatt Studios, West Islip, NY
- Genres: Brutal death metal; technical death metal; thrash metal
- Length: 23:14, 29:03 (reissue)
- Label: Relapse
- Producer: Suffocation

Suffocation chronology
Human Waste (1991)	Effigy of the Forgotten (1991)

Professional ratings
Review scores
Source	Rating
AllMusic	4/5 stars
The Encyclopedia of Popular Music	4/5 stars

Human Waste is the debut EP by death metal band Suffocation. It was released in May 1991 through Relapse Records.

== Background and release ==
Human Waste was the first ever CD to be released by Relapse.

"Infecting The Crypts", "Mass Obliteration", and "Jesus Wept" were re-recorded on the following album, Effigy of the Forgotten. "Synthetically Revived" was also re-recorded on Pierced from Within and "Catatonia" was re-recorded for the Despise the Sun EP. The only track that has not been re-recorded is the title track, which was originally recorded for the demo Reincremated.

Human Waste was reissued in 2005 with two bonus tracks taken from the 1990 demo Reincremated (which are "Involuntary Slaughter" and "Reincremation").

== Music ==
The styles on Human Waste have been categorized as death metal and thrash metal. Subverting what were considered "traditional song structures even in thrash metal circles", the EP's tracks are built around sequences of riffs, and are performed at what have been described as "blitzkrieg" tempos. Crypta bassist Fernanda Lira says the string skipping required on "Infecting the Crypts" makes it the "at least in the top five hardest bass riffs".

== Critical reception ==
Eduardo Rivadavia of AllMusic called the EP "formative but still pretty respectable."

== Track listing ==
All lyrics are written by Suffocation.

No.	Title	Length
1.	"Infecting the Crypts"	4:38
2.	"Synthetically Revived"	3:38
3.	"Mass Obliteration"	4:29
4.	"Catatonia"	3:56
5.	"Jesus Wept"	3:38
6.	"Human Waste"	2:56
Total length:		23:14

Digital reissue bonus tracks
No.	Title	Length
7.	"Involuntary Slaughter" (Reincremated Demo 1990)	2:55
8.	"Reincremation" (Reincremated Demo 1990)	2:54
Total length:		29:03

== Personnel ==
- Frank Mullen - vocals
- Terrance Hobbs - lead guitar
- Doug Cerrito - rhythm guitar
- Josh Barohn - bass
- Mike Smith - drums

== Production ==
- Conrad Ziarnink- engineer on reissue (tracks: 6 to 8)
- Paul Bagin - engineer on first press (tracks: 1 to 6), reissue (tracks: 1 to 7)
- Matthew F. Jacobson - executive producer
- Suffocation - producer
- Ron Spencer - artwork
