= Effigy of the Forgotten =

Studio album by Suffocation
- Released: October 8, 1991
- Recorded: June 1991
- Studios: Morrisound Recording, in Tampa, Florida
- Genres: Brutal death metal; technical death metal
- Length: 37:06
- Label: Roadrunner
- Producer: Scott Burns

Suffocation chronology
| Human Waste (1991) | Effigy of the Forgotten (1991) | Breeding the Spawn (1993) |

Effigy of the Forgotten is the debut full-length album by New York–based death metal band Suffocation, released in 1991. The album features re-recorded versions of several tracks that appeared on the band's Reincremation demo and Human Waste EP. The cover artwork was created by Dan Seagrave.

The album was dedicated to the memory of fellow metal band Atheist's bassist Roger Patterson, who was killed in a car crash earlier in 1991.

Effigy of the Forgotten was recorded at Morrisound Recording in Tampa, Florida and was produced by Scott Burns. The album's music is highly technical, featuring many guitar solos. George "Corpsegrinder" Fisher has a guest appearance on the track "Mass Obilteration". Dan Seagrave created the album's cover artwork.

Effigy of the Forgotten initially received mixed reviews, but has since received critical acclaim and is now regarded as one of the most influential death metal albums of all time, serving as a blueprint for death metal in the 90s. This album and Pierced from Within have been re-released by Roadrunner Records as part of the Two from the Vault series.

== Background and recording ==
Guitarist Terrance Hobbs said of the album's songwriting process, "We were a bunch of kids down in a basement. Obviously, we were fans of heavy metal, and we were writing riffs on our own, so it was just a matter of putting all that together. That’s where the music came from. We’d sit together and play for hours."

Suffocation recorded Effigy of the Forgotten over the course of a week in June 1991 at Morrisound Recording in Tampa, Florida, on a budget of $5,000. At the same time, Florida death metal band Monstrosity were recording their debut full-length, Imperial Doom, there. George "Corpsegrinder" Fisher, then-vocalist for Monstrosity, recorded guest vocals on the album, recalling being asked to do so while drinking heavily with the members of Suffocation. He recorded his vocal parts while half-drunk.

== Artwork ==
Dan Seagrave created the album's cover artwork. Seagrave worked with other early death metal bands, such as Morbid Angel. According to guitarist Terrance Hobbs in 2021: "The Effigy cover is one of our favorites. I mean, we were mallrat kids. When we went into Record Stop or Tape World, we were always looking for the craziest covers. If the cover was explicit, we were like, “Oh shit! We gotta get this!” Anything that had to do with science fiction, fucked up faces, guitars, laser beams, horror, dark, and shitty stuff, I was into. I was such a fanboy. I remember we got Darkness Descends and Reign in Blood because we liked the cover art. That shit blew our minds! [Laughs] Goosebumps. I blew up the Slayer cassette because I played it so much. Fucking insane!"

Seagrave himself reflected on the album cover's creation in 2016, saying: "I spent six weeks on this painting, but put it on hold to make Dismember’s Like an Everflowing Stream, which landed with a tight deadline. I kept Roadrunner waiting a bit consequently for something they didn’t really know what they were getting. This was a gamble of an artwork. Extremely improvised elements based on a few pre-made sketches. There are mini-paintings within the painting. Made from working only from the album title, which I often liked to do. The scene depicts a feral machine scouring a twisted landscape for remnants of life. Those to consume for their bio fuel and DNA, in order to create a fusion of new life. The hatching eggs, and effigy of the foreground. The title can also refer to the skeletal remains of the human foetus in a small detail of the painting."

== Music ==
Effigy of the Forgotten is considered a death metal album with a highly sophisticated level of technical proficiency, being a pioneering record in the establishment of technical death metal. Eduardo Rivadavia of AllMusic described the album's sound as "a truly devastating display of technical death metal bordering on grindcore." Tom Campagna of Invisible Oranges said "as far removed as Morbid Angel was from thrash, Suffocation spilled the blood even farther." The guitars, which are tuned to C Standard (four half-steps, or two whole steps, down from standard tuning) feature fast palm muted riffing, tremolo picking as well as guitar solos. The guitar rhythms have been described as "mathematical". The drumming involves blast beats and quick fills. Campagna commented further, "what appears to be cacophonous noise is a multi-layered bean dip with something new on each subsequent listen."

The breakdown riff in the hook of "Liege of Inveracity" has been credited as the first slam riff in death metal, later inspiring an offshoot of death metal known as slam death metal.

== Reception and legacy ==
Contemporary reviews
Review scores
| Source | Rating |
|---|---|
| Kerrang! | 2/5 stars |
| Metal Forces | 60/100 |
| Rock Hard | 3/10 |

Retrospective reviews
Review scores
| Source | Rating |
|---|---|
| AllMusic | 4/5 stars |
| The Encyclopedia of Popular Music | 3/5 stars |
| Metal.de | 9/10 |
| Metal Storm | 10/10 |

Effigy of the Forgotten initially received mixed reviews, but has since received critical acclaim and is considered by many to be one of the most influential death metal albums of all time. It is regarded as a pioneering record in the development of multiple subgenres of death metal, notably brutal death metal, slam death metal, and technical death metal, becoming a benchmark of the latter genre along with Death's fourth album Human, Pestilence's third album Testimony of the Ancients, and Atheist's second album Unquestionable Presence.

Decibel Magazine would later say: "Effigy of the Forgotten was a benchmark for extreme music, as it sacrificed neither virtuosity or brutality, becoming a signpost for thousands who were still contemplating how to incorporate scalar runs, rapid-fire palm-muting and hummingbird-wing-quick picking into riffs, while opening up rhythmic dimensions and the scope of the blast beat."

In 2013, Graham Hartmann of Loudwire wrote: "Baffling enough, when performed live, the tracks from Effigy of the Forgotten consistently remain as Suffocation's most purely brutal offerings. The album is widely known for blueprinting low guttural vocals and integrating masterful technicality within brutal death metal, and the disc's tracks 'Infecting the Crypts,' 'Liege of Inveracity' and 'Jesus Wept' could compete with any modern death metal song in a competition of pure heaviness."

In 2016, Invisible Oranges commended the album's artwork and Burn's production, conferring the titles of "bonafide death metal classic" and "one of the heaviest [...] ever recorded" on the album. Staff writer Tom Campagna wrote: "The band would go on to record the ill-fated Breeding The Spawn a year and a half later. For that album, Roadrunner refused to let the band join Scott Burns in the studio again, which led to a poor recording and eventually Smith’s first exit from the band (he returned when the band reformed in 2004 with Souls to Deny). But for a shining moment in 1991 Suffocation were one of the most promising, new, brutally heavy, technically sound bands on the scene. 25 years later this is still one of the heaviest albums ever recorded.

In 2021, Chris Dick of Decibel wrote: "Suffocation, unlike many of their peers, put their rhythm players (bassist Josh Barohn and drummer Mike Smith) front and center of the carnage. The opening bass-drum salvo to the title track is brief but killer, and their involvement throughout Effigy of the Forgotten is not just notable but genre-definable. That Mike Smith was able to carve out a new drum pattern–the “Smithblast”–was just another unique trait in Suffocation’s beastly quiver."

Metal Hammer named Effigy the 18th best death metal album of all time, calling it "effectively ground zero" for the brutal death metal subgenre.

== Track listing ==
| No. | Title | Lyrics | Music | Length |
|---|---|---|---|---|
| 1. | "Liege of Inveracity" | Barohn | Hobbs, Cerrito | 4:28 |
| 2. | "Effigy of the Forgotten" | Barohn | Hobbs, Cerrito, Barohn | 3:47 |
| 3. | "Infecting the Crypts" | Cerrito | Hobbs, Cerrito, Barohn | 4:45 |
| 4. | "Seeds of the Suffering" | Mullen | Hobbs, Cerrito | 5:51 |
| 5. | "Habitual Infamy" | Cerrito | Hobbs, Cerrito | 4:15 |
| 6. | "Reincremation" | Cerrito, Barohn | Cerrito, Smith | 2:52 |
| 7. | "Mass Obliteration" | Smith, Barohn | Hobbs, Cerrito, Barohn | 4:30 |
| 8. | "Involuntary Slaughter" | Mullen | Hobbs | 3:00 |
| 9. | "Jesus Wept" | Barohn | Hobbs, Cerrito | 3:38 |
| Total length: | | | | 37:06 |

== Personnel ==
Suffocation

- Frank Mullen – vocals
- Terrance Hobbs – lead guitar
- Doug Cerrito – rhythm guitar
- Josh Barohn – bass
- Mike Smith – drums

Guest musician

- George "Corpsegrinder" Fisher – additional vocals on "Reincremation" and "Mass Obliteration."

Production

- Scott Burns – production, engineering, mixing
- Eddy Schreyer – mastering
- Dan Seagrave – artwork
