= Souls to Deny =

2004 studio album by band Suffocation

Studio album by Suffocation
- Released: April 27, 2004
- Recorded: January–February 2004
- Studio: FullForce Studio in Port Jefferson, New York
- Genre: Technical death metal
- Length: 38:20
- Label: Relapse
- Producer: Joe Cincotta

Suffocation chronology
Despise the Sun (1998)	Souls to Deny (2004)	Suffocation (2006)

Professional ratings
Review scores
Source	Rating
AllMusic	4/5 stars
Brave Words & Bloody Knuckles	7.5/10
Collector's Guide to Heavy Metal	6/10

Souls to Deny is the fourth studio album by death metal band Suffocation. It is the band's first release following their 2003 reformation and is the first album to feature original guitarist Guy Marchais (ex-Pyrexia, ex-Internal Bleeding). It also features the return of original drummer Mike Smith. Bass guitar tracks on the album are played by guitarist Terrance Hobbs and drummer Mike Smith, as they did not have a bassist during recording. The cover artwork is by artist Dan Seagrave.

== Track listing ==
All tracks are written by Suffocation, except where noted.

No.	Title	Lyrics	Length
1.	"Deceit"		4:40
2.	"To Weep Once More"		4:31
3.	"Souls to Deny"		5:45
4.	"Surgery of Impalement"		3:51
5.	"Demise of the Clone"		4:36
6.	"Subconsciously Enslaved"		4:24
7.	"Immortally Condemned"		6:03
8.	"Tomes of Acrimony"	Keith DeVito	4:30
Total length:			38:20

== Personnel ==
=== Suffocation ===
- Frank Mullen – vocals
- Terrance Hobbs – lead guitar, bass
- Guy Marchais – rhythm guitar
- Mike Smith – drums, bass

=== Production ===
- Dan Seagrave – cover art
- David Ungar – band photography
- Joe Cincotta – engineering, mixing
- Scott Hull – mastering
