= Suffocation (band) =

American death metal band

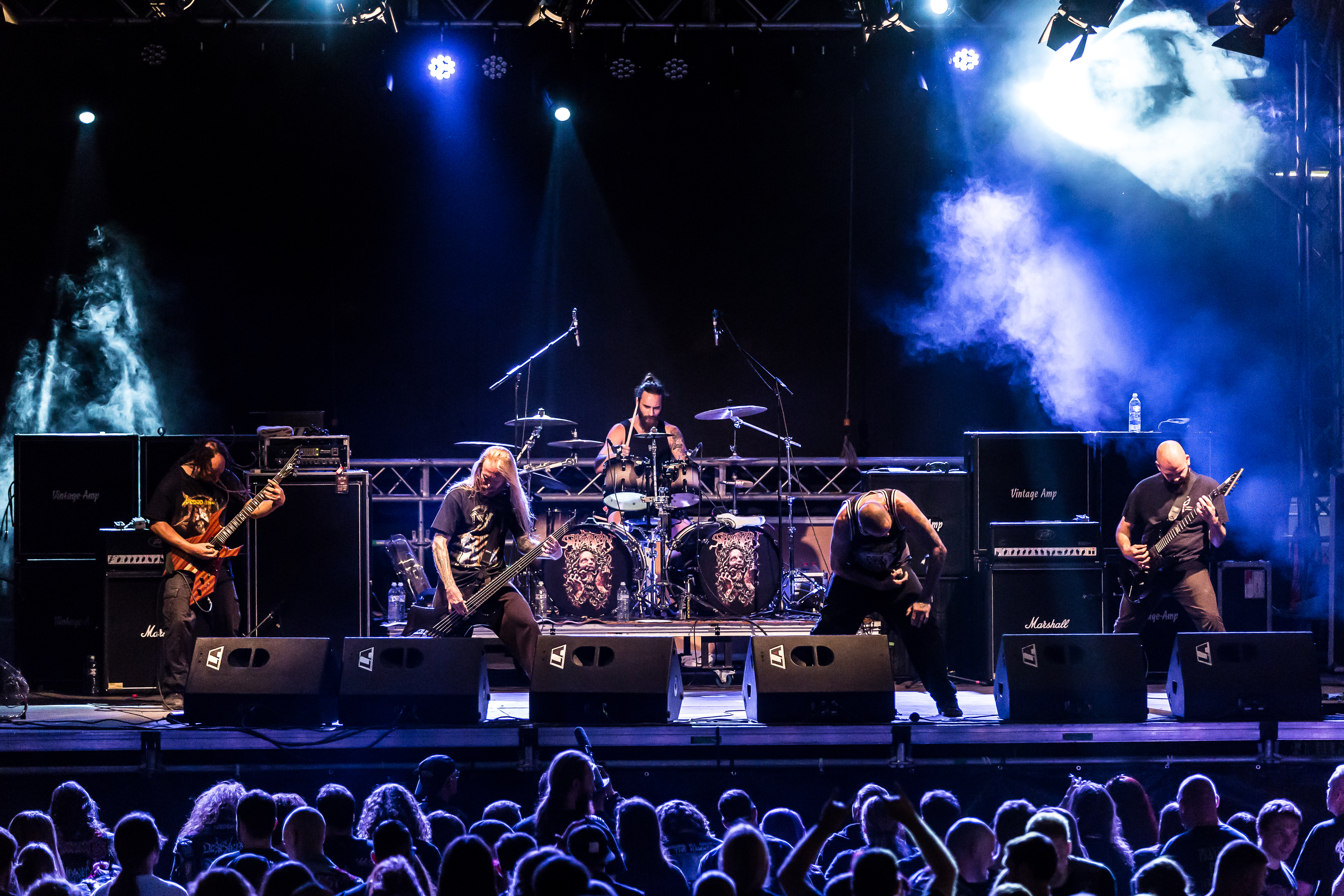
- Performing in 2018

Background information
- Origin: Centereach, New York, U.S.
- Genres: Technical death metal; brutal death metal
- Years active: 1989–1998; 2003–present
- Labels: Nuclear Blast; Relapse; Roadrunner
- Members: Terrance Hobbs; Derek Boyer; Charlie Errigo; Ricky Myers; John Longstreth
- Past members: Frank Mullen; Todd German; Doug Cerrito; Josh Barohn; Chris Richards; Doug Bohn; Mike Smith; Dave Culross; Guy Marchais; Kevin Talley; Eric Morotti
- Website: suffocationofficial.com

Suffocation is an American death metal band formed in 1989 in Centereach, New York, currently consisting of lead guitarist Terrance Hobbs, bassist Derek Boyer, rhythm guitarist Charlie Errigo, vocalist Ricky Myers, and live drummer John Longstreth. The band rose to prominence with their 1991 debut album, Effigy of the Forgotten, a blueprint for death metal in the 1990s. Since then, Suffocation has recorded eight albums. These feature growled vocals with downtuned guitars, fast and complex guitar riffs and drumming, open chord notes and occasional breakdowns.

In 2016, the staff of Loudwire named them the 23rd-best metal band of all time.

== History ==
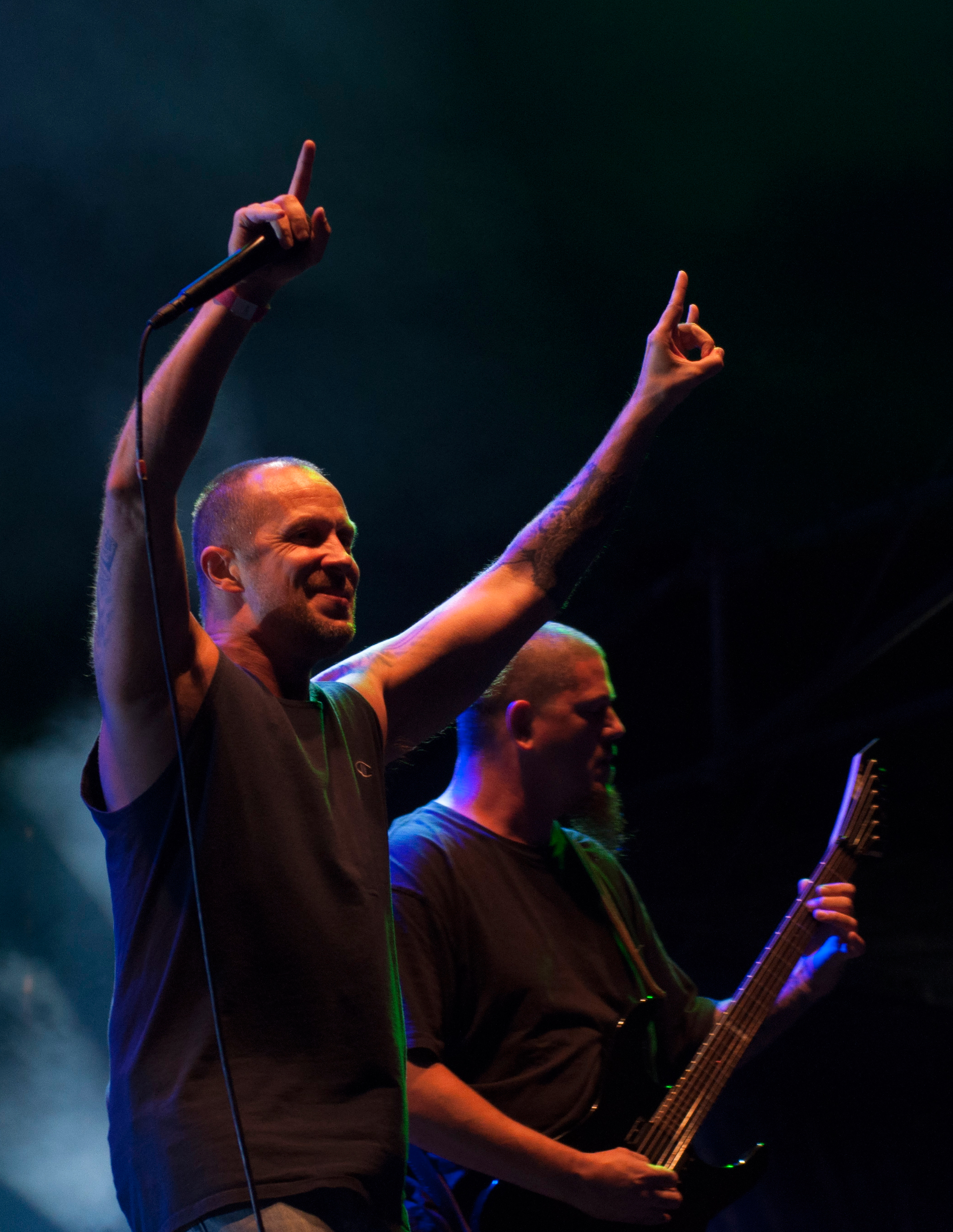
Frank Mullen (left) and Guy Marchais in 2014

=== Early years (1989–1990) ===
Suffocation was formed in 1989 on Long Island, New York, by vocalist Frank Mullen, guitarists Guy Marchais and Todd German, bassist Josh Barohn, and an unidentified drummer. Mullen named the band after the Morbid Angel song of the same name. By 1990, the band had replaced their founding members with hired guitarists Terrance Hobbs and Doug Cerrito along with drummer Mike Smith, who were members of local band Mortuary, which had disbanded. The quintet was influenced by American death metal bands as well as Britain's Napalm Death and Brazil's Sepultura. Suffocation was unique in the death metal community for featuring African-American musicians. Smith commenting on meeting Hobbs for the first time, "That's where I first noticed, 'Wow, there's another black guy playing this kind of stuff.'" They signed with Relapse Records in 1990, one of the first three bands to sign to the new label alongside Incantation and Deceased.

=== Human Waste and Effigy of the Forgotten (1991–1992) ===
The band's first EP, Human Waste, was released through Relapse Records in 1991. The first full-length debut album, Effigy of the Forgotten, was recorded by producer Scott Burns at Morrisound Studios in Tampa, Florida and released by Roadrunner Records in 1991. The album took a week to produce, and was recorded on $5,000. Hobbs said of the experience, "To know that Deicide, Death, Morbid Angel and all those bands were in that studio was a super amazing experience [...] Florida was a big thing; that was like our Mecca. For us to go down to Morrisound, recording with Scott Burns, an amazing engineer, was just unbelievable."

Though it initially received mixed reviews from critics, Effigy of the Forgotten would later be acclaimed and become influential in extreme metal music, influencing the technical death metal and slam death metal genres. In 2004, the album was voted the 342nd greatest metal album of all time in Martin Popoff's book of The Top 500 Heavy Metal Albums of All Time.

In July 1991, founding bassist Josh Barohn left to join Autopsy and was replaced with Chris Richards (ex Apparition/Sorrow).

The band toured the US in 1992 and 1993 to support the album. An early tour included Vader, Dismember and Defiance. On July 16, 1992, the band travelled to Detroit, Michigan and played a "spot show" with Brutal Truth, Pungent Stench, Incantation and Exhorder. Terrance Hobbs recalled, "I think we got a lot of momentum by [going] out there to play. That’s why you saw us playing together all the time. We’d get brought out there all the time. We played a lot of gigs back then, but it was spotty. It wasn’t until ’96 that we really started to tour, but we broke up two years later."

=== Breeding the Spawn, Pierced from Within, and hiatus (1993–1995) ===
In 1993, sophomore album Breeding the Spawn was released. Its production and mixing was a harshly criticized weak point. The band was due back at Morrisound to record the album with Scott Burns, but Roadrunner refused to pay for studio time, forcing them to record elsewhere. After this album, drummer Mike Smith left the band, the recording situation a major reason for his departure. He was replaced with Doug Bohn. Tracks of Breeding the Spawn would be re-recorded in future Suffocation releases.

The 1995 release Pierced from Within, which had better production, was followed by extensive tours in Europe, Canada, Mexico and the United States. In 1998, Suffocation released the EP Despise the Sun via Vulture Records and disbanded soon after. The EP was re-released later in 2000 and 2002 by Relapse Records.

=== Reunion and later years (2003–present) ===
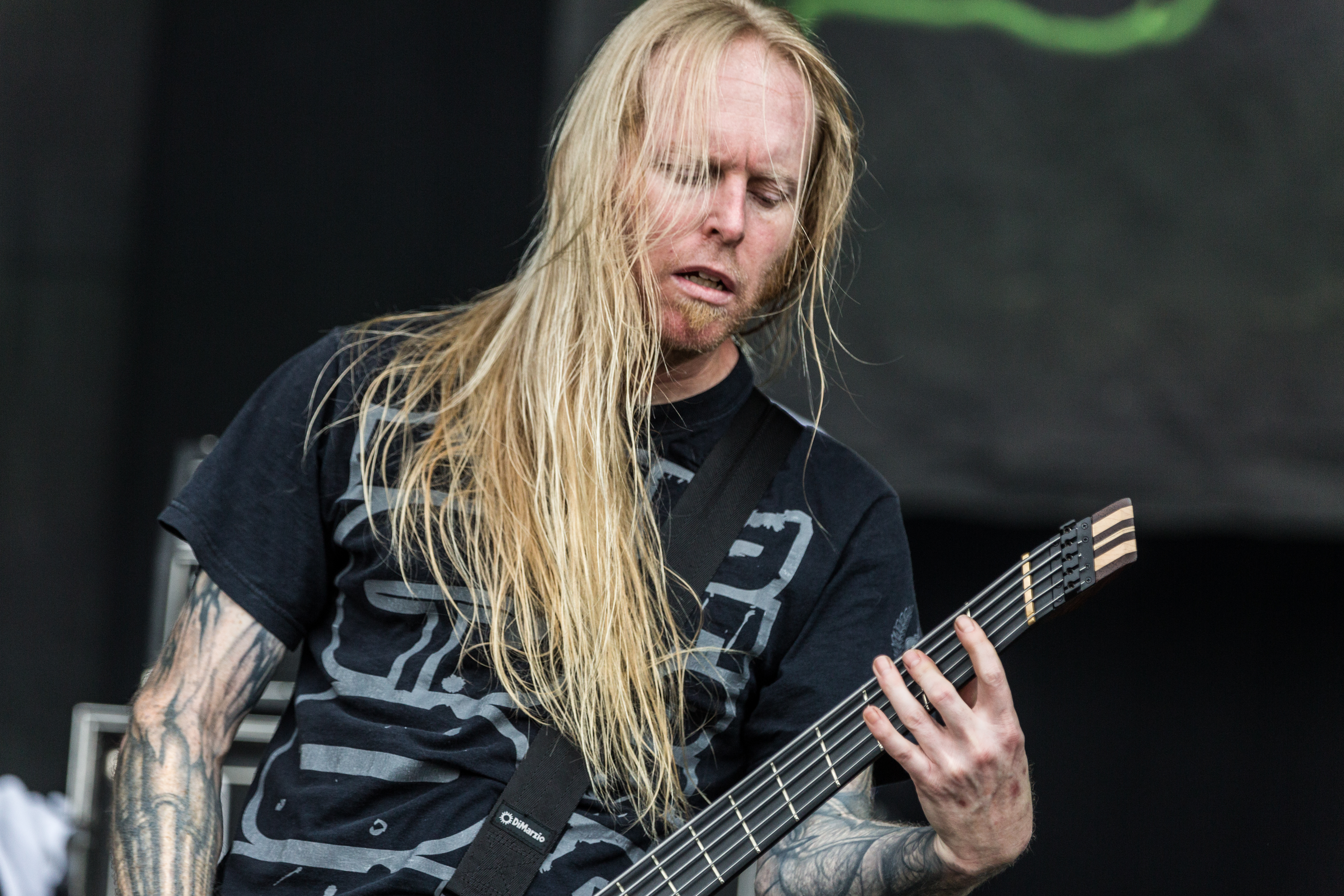
Derek Boyer in 2017

Mullen and Hobbs reformed in 2003 with Smith, returning founding members Guy Marchais on guitar, and Josh Barohn on bass. Barohn left the band soon. Suffocation hired bassist Derek Boyer of the bands Deeds of Flesh and Decrepit Birth. In April 2004, Relapse Records released Souls to Deny. After playing more than 400 shows in the United States and Europe, including the Wacken Festival in Germany, playing to over 33,000 fans, Suffocation released their self-titled album, Suffocation, in 2006. In 2007, the band was featured in The History Channel's promotional video for The Dark Ages documentary, playing the song "Bind, Torture, Kill".

In 2008, the band signed to Nuclear Blast Records and released their album Blood Oath in 2009. The album charted on the US Billboard 200 at number 135. In 2009, Relapse re-released the live album Close of a Chapter—Live in Québec City, previously self-released by the band in 2005. The release of the documentary Legacy of Violence was set for 2010, but was delayed. In May 2010, Suffocation toured with Napalm Death in South America and Mexico. In February 2012, Smith left the band again, replaced with the returning Dave Culross.

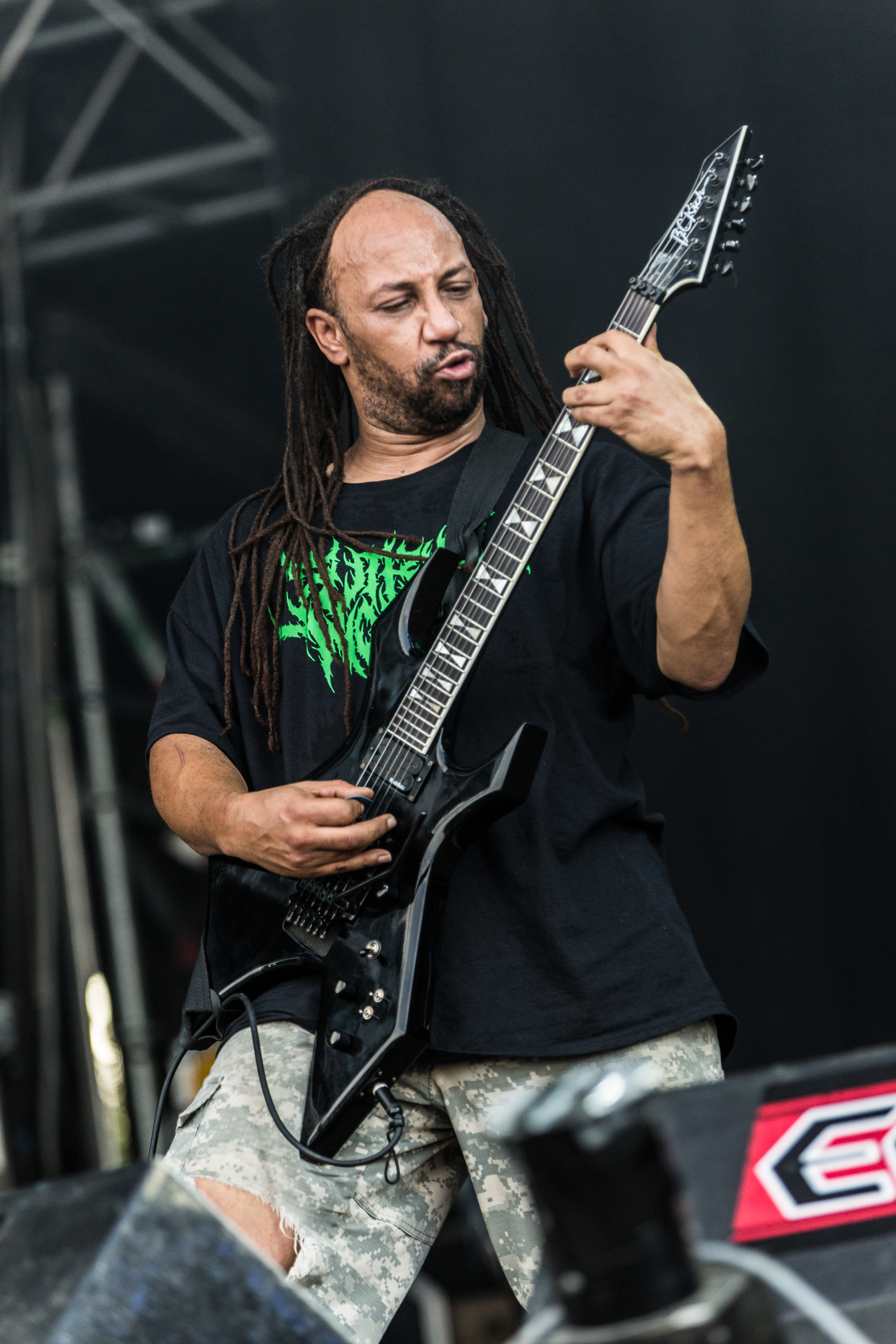
Terrance Hobbs in 2017

In 2012, the band was inducted into the Long Island Music Hall of Fame and released Pinnacle of Bedlam in February 2013. Since after the release of Pinnacle of Bedlam in 2013, vocalist Frank Mullen announced that he would retire from full-time touring due to his new job. He was replaced with various live vocal stand-ins, including Bill Robinson, John Gallagher, Kevin Muller, and, currently, Ricky Myers.

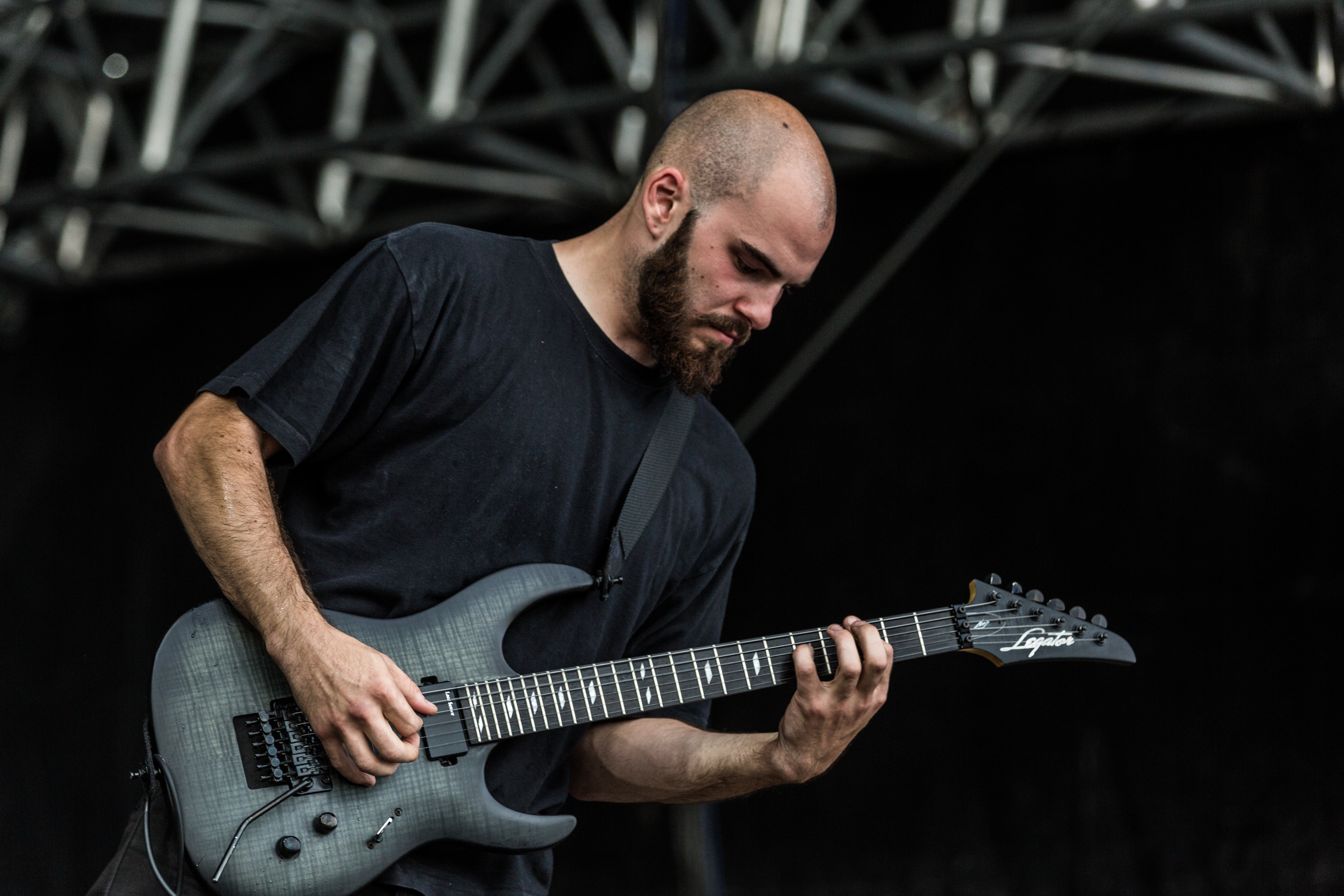
Charlie Errigo in 2017

In January 2015, Suffocation revealed that they were recording demos for a new album, with a potential release date of late 2015. In April 2016, the band toured with Soulfly, Abnormality, Battlecross and Lody Kong. In the spring of 2017, they supported Morbid Angel on a US tour along with Revocation and Withered.

The new album was ...Of the Dark Light, released on June 9, 2017. Later in 2017, Kevin Muller, who had previously been a touring member, joined the band full-time alongside vocalist Frank Mullen, leading the two to share vocals on the last album. He stepped down at the end of the year and was replaced with a returning Myers in 2018. On March 12, 2018, it was announced that Frank Mullen would do one more tour with Suffocation before officially retiring from the band. They were joined by Cattle Decapitation and Krisiun on this tour. Mullen returned in June 2019 for a final Japanese tour.

On September 12, 2023, the band announced their ninth album, Hymns from the Apocrypha, released on November 3. The album won Album Of The Month at Metallian. The band began touring in support of the release immediately.

Suffocation toured Europe in the summer of 2025. Stops included festival dates such as Brutal Assault and Summer Breeze Open Air. They embarked on another tour of Europe with Cradle of Filth late in the year.

Suffocation was confirmed to perform at the 2026 Sonic Temple music festival in Columbus, Ohio. The band were confirmed to appear at Welcome to Rockville, which took place in Daytona Beach, Florida in May 2026.

On April 10, 2026, after ten years as a member, drummer Eric Morotti announced his departure from Suffocation. Morotti stated on his Instagram, "Today. On my. Birthday. I have chosen to step away from Suffocation to prolong my health, myself. My integrity. I will not work with toxic. Abusive drug addicts. Let alone allow them to boss me around. I've been belittled and stepped all over for too long." While not directly addressing Morotti's departure, the band announced John Longstreth would perform as a "very special guest" for their forthcoming Spring 2026 tour the next day.

== Musical style, influences and legacy ==
Suffocation are considered by many to be one of the pioneers of technical death metal. Lead guitarist Terrance Hobbs shared his view on the subgenre's development, recalling "As bands started to get progressively faster, our ears really liked that [...] Going from thrash like Slayer, Destruction and Metallica to us was natural. We just wanted to go faster and faster." The band's sound has also been said to contain elements of brutal death metal, thrash metal, speed metal, and grindcore. Guitarists Doug Cerrito and Terrance Hobbs have been referred to as "the guitar duo from hell," drawing comparisons to Kerry King and Jeff Hanneman of Slayer.

Suffocation uses "outrageously guttural vocals with a bottom-heavy guitar foundation, blistering speed, unparalleled brutality and sophisticated sense of songwriting, complex time changes and lead and rhythm guitar acrobatics" and occasional slam riffs and breakdowns.

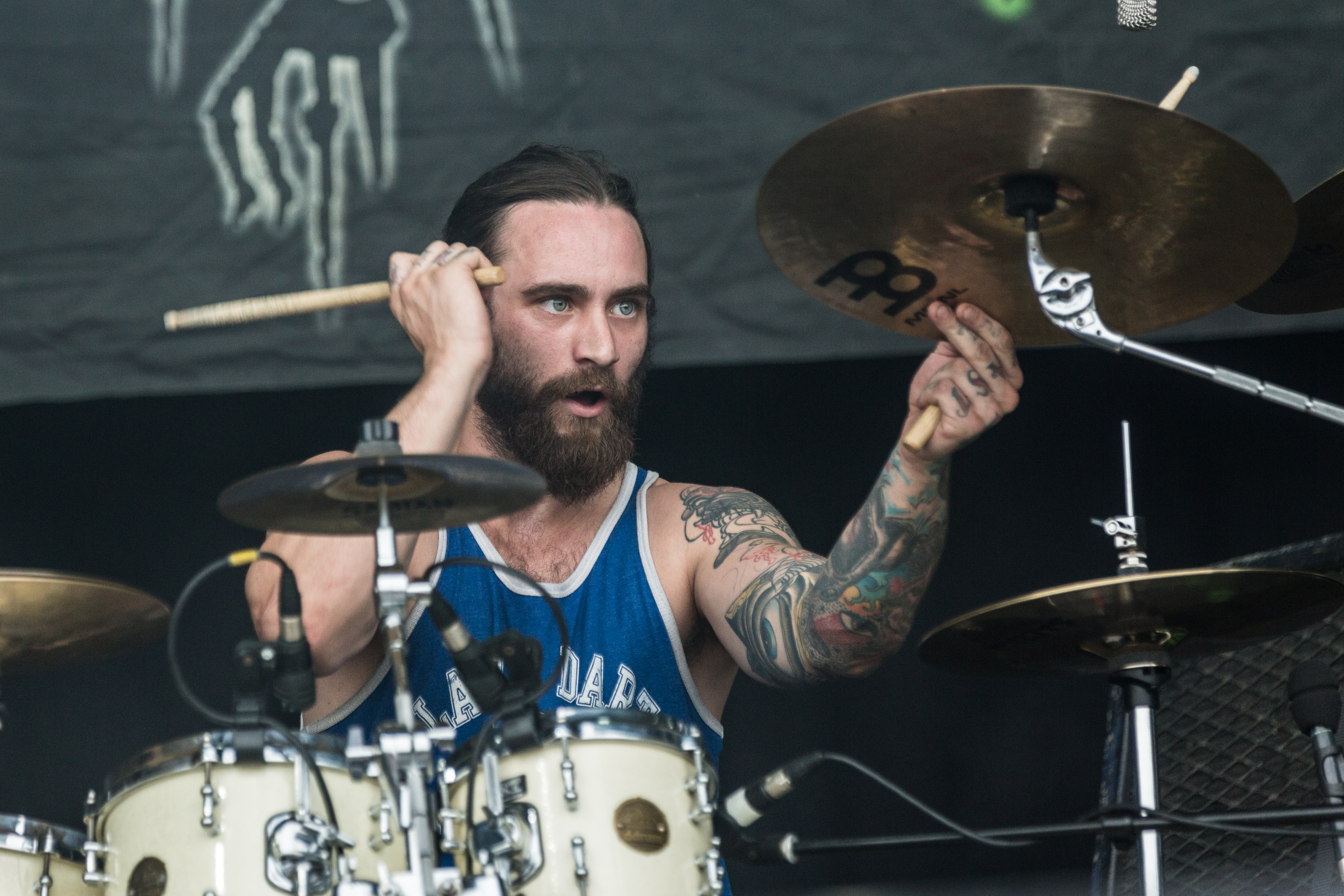
Eric Morotti in 2017

With their debut album, Effigy of the Forgotten (1991), Suffocation rose to prominence in death metal and created a blueprint for the genre for the 1990s, retaining their style after the reunion in 2003. Decibel Magazine stated: "Effigy of the Forgotten was a benchmark for extreme music, as it sacrificed neither virtuosity or brutality, becoming a signpost for thousands who were still contemplating how to incorporate scalar runs, rapid-fire palm-muting and hummingbird-wing-quick picking into riffs, while opening up rhythmic dimensions and the scope of the blast beat."

Blabbermouth.net described Suffocation as "American death metal's most consistent and punishing standard-bearers" and their style as "brutal death metal". Leslie Mathew of Allmusic stated Mullen is one of the best vocalists in the genre. Decibel Magazine stated: "One of Suffocation's trademarks, breakdowns, has spawned an entire metal subgenre: deathcore."

Leslie Mathew of AllMusic conferred the title of "the connoisseur's death metal band" on Suffocation.

Guitarist Terrance Hobbs has cited Slayer, Destruction, Death, King Diamond, Atheist, and Metallica as early influences on the band's sound. He also cited "stadium rockers" such as Ozzy Osbourne, Led Zeppelin and Iron Maiden as having influenced various elements of the band's craft. He said, "musically, if it was in that thrash metal, hardcore, death metal-type vein, we were into it, and I think we were playing off all that."

== Band members ==
Current

- Terrance Hobbs – lead guitar (1990–1998, 2003–present)
- Derek Boyer – bass (2004–present)
- Charlie Errigo – rhythm guitar (2016–present)
- Ricky Myers – vocals (2019–present; live member: 2015–2016, 2018)

Former

- Frank Mullen – vocals (1989–1998, 2003–2019)
- Josh Barohn – bass (1989–1991, 2003–2004)
- Guy Marchais – rhythm guitar (1989–1990, 2003–2016)
- Todd German – lead guitar (1989–1990)
- Doug Cerrito – rhythm guitar (1990–1998)
- Mike Smith – drums (1990–1994, 2003–2012)
- Chris Richards – bass (1991–1998)
- Doug Bohn – drums (1994–1995)
- Dave Culross – drums (1995–1998, 2012–2014)
- Kevin Talley – drums (2014–2016)
- Eric Morotti – drums (2016–2026)

Live

- Bill Robinson – vocals (2012)
- John Gallagher – vocals (2013)
- Kevin Muller – vocals (2017)
- John Longstreth – drums (2026–present)

Timeline

== Discography ==
=== Studio albums ===
Title	Album details	Peak chart positions						Sales
Title	Album details	US	US Heat.	US Ind.	GER	BEL (FL)	BEL (WA)	Sales
Effigy of the Forgotten	Released: October 8, 1991; Label: Roadrunner Records; Formats: CD, CS, LP, download	—	—	—	—	—	—	
Breeding the Spawn	Released: May 18, 1993; Label: Roadrunner Records; Formats: CD, CS, LP, download	—	—	—	—	—	—	
Pierced from Within	Released: May 23, 1995; Label: Roadrunner Records; Formats: CD, CS, LP, download	—	—	—	—	—	—	
Souls to Deny	Released: April 27, 2004; Label: Relapse Records; Formats: CD, LP, download	—	—	34	—	—	—	
Suffocation	Released: September 19, 2006; Label: Relapse Records; Formats: CD, LP, download	—	29	29	—	—	—	
Blood Oath	Released: July 3, 2009; Label: Nuclear Blast; Formats: CD, LP, download	135	2	—	—	—	—	US: 5,700+
Pinnacle of Bedlam	Released: February 15, 2013; Label: Nuclear Blast; Formats: CD, CD+DVD, CS, LP, download	152	2	25	58	197	119	US: 8,500+
...Of the Dark Light	Released: June 9, 2017; Label: Nuclear Blast; Formats: CD, CD+DVD, CS, LP, download	—	—	—	80	167	—	
Hymns from the Apocrypha	Released: November 3, 2023; Label: Nuclear Blast; Formats: CD, CD+DVD, CS, LP, download	—	—	—	53	—	—	
"—" denotes a recording that did not chart or was not released in that territory.

=== Live albums ===
Title	Album details	Notes
Close of a Chapter: Live in Québec City	Released: 2005; Label: Self-released; Formats: CD, download	re-released by Relapse Records on October 27, 2009
Live in North America	Released: November 12, 2021; Label: Nuclear Blast; Formats: CD, cassette	Recorded on October 22, 2018, at Middle East Down in Cambridge, MA on the Death Chopping North America Tour (final North American tour with Frank Mullen)

=== EPs ===
Title	Album details
Human Waste	Released: May 1, 1991; Label: Relapse Records; Formats: CD, CS, LP, download
Despise the Sun	Released: April 30, 1998; Label: Vulture Records; Formats: CD, LP, download

=== Compilation albums ===
Title	Album details
The Best of Suffocation	Released: January 29, 2008; Label: Roadrunner Records; Formats: CD, download

=== Demos ===
Title	Album details
Reincremated	Released: July 1990; Label: Self-released; Formats: CS

=== Music videos ===
Year	Title	Directed	Album
2004	"Surgery of Impalement"	Adam Wingard	Souls to Deny
2005	"Synthetically Revived	Adam Wingard	Human Waste
2006	"Abomination Reborn"	Rick Carmona	Suffocation
2007	"Bind Torture Kill"		Suffocation
2009	"Cataclysmic Purification"	David Brodsky	Blood Oath
2010	"Blood Oath"		Blood Oath
2013	"As Grace Descends"	Tommy Jones	Pinnacle of Bedlam
2023	"Seraphim Enslavement"	Tom Flynn	Hymns From The Apocrypha

== Notes ==
A. Since the release of Pinnacle of Bedlam in 2013 until his retirement from the band in 2018, Frank Mullen announced that he would be retiring from full-time touring with the band due to his new job. He has since been replaced by various live vocal stand-ins, including Bill Robinson, John Gallagher, Ricky Myers, and Kevin Muller.
