= ...And Time Begins =

Studio album by Decrepit Birth
- Released: October 7, 2003
- Recorded: 2003
- Studio: Legion Studios, Santa Cruz, California
- Genre: Technical death metal
- Length: 30:06
- Label: Unique Leader
- Producer: Decrepit Birth

Decrepit Birth chronology
...And Time Begins (2003)	Diminishing Between Worlds (2008)

Professional ratings
Review scores
Source	Rating
AllMusic	3.5/5 stars
Sputnikmusic	3.5/5 stars
MetalReview	8.6/10
Maelstrom	7/10 stars

...And Time Begins is the debut studio album by American death metal band Decrepit Birth. The album was released on October 7, 2003 through Unique Leader Records.

== Critical reception ==
Phil Freeman of AllMusic gave the album three and a half stars out of five and said: "While the riffs are extremely complex and go by with lightning speed, these very qualities also render them somewhat unmemorable. Cannibal Corpse are a great example of a band able to play high-speed, complicated death metal and also make it catchy -- their songs stick in your head. Decrepit Birth, while being impressively brutal and crushing, can't say the same."

== Track listing ==
No.	Title	Length
1.	"Prelude to the Apocalypse"	1:24
2.	"Condemned to Nothingness"	3:02
3.	"Thought Beyond Infinity"	2:58
4.	"The Infestation"	2:14
5.	"Rebirth of Consciousness"	2:14
6.	"Shroud of Impurity"	3:29
7.	"Concepting the Era"	3:31
8.	"Of Genocide"	2:10
9.	"...And Time Begins"	9:04
Total length:		30:06

== Personnel ==
Decrepit Birth

- Bill Robinson – lead vocals
- Matt Sotelo – guitars, vocals
- Derek Boyer – bass, vocals
- Tim Yeung – drums

Production

- Dan Seagrave – Cover art
- Jen Powell – Photography
- Matt Sotelo – Engineering
- Derek Boyer – Engineering
- Damon Cisneros – Recording (drums only)
- Colin Davis – Mixing, Mastering
- Jacoby – Layout, Design
