= Diminishing Between Worlds =

Studio album by Decrepit Birth
- Released: January 29, 2008
- Recorded: 2007
- Genre: Technical death metal
- Length: 44:44
- Label: Unique Leader

Decrepit Birth chronology
...And Time Begins (2003)	Diminishing Between Worlds (2008)	Polarity (2010)

Professional ratings
Review scores
Source	Rating
AllMusic	4/5 stars
Sputnikmusic	4.5/5 stars
MetalReview	8.5/10 stars
Lords of Metal	8.8/10 stars

Diminishing Between Worlds is the second studio album by American death metal band Decrepit Birth. It was released on January 29, 2008 through Unique Leader Records. It was voted the best album of 2008 by MetalReview.com for the melodic experimentations by the band.

== Track listing ==
1. "The Living Doorway" – 4:23
2. "Reflection of Emotions" – 4:16
3. "Diminishing Between Worlds" – 3:51
4. "Dimensions Intertwine" – 3:45
5. "The Enigmatic Form" – 3:15
6. "A Gathering of Imaginations" – 4:07
7. "Through Alchemy Bound Eternal" – 4:29
8. "...And Time Begins" – 3:51
9. "Await the Unending" – 5:17
10. "Essence of Creation" – 6:34
11. "The Morpheus Oracle (Outro)" – 0:56

== Personnel ==
- Bill Robinson – vocals
- Matt Sotelo – guitars, bass, keyboards, backing vocals
- KC Howard – drums
- Ty Oliver – outro solo on "The Enigmatic Form"
