= Mike Smith (drummer) =

American musician (born 1971)

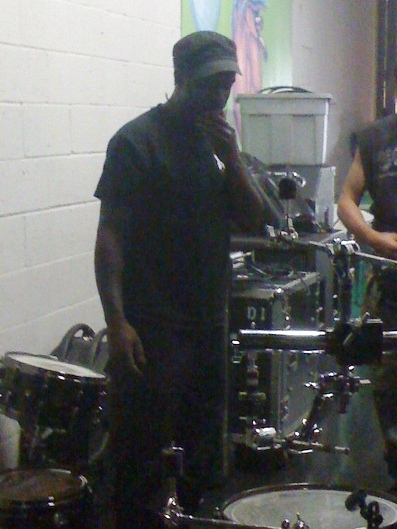
- Smith backstage with Suffocation in 2010

Background information
- Born: Mike Smith; July 16, 1971 (age 55); The Bronx, New York City
- Genres: Horrorcore, technical death metal
- Occupations: Drum Instructor and hired Studio Musician
- Instrument: Drums
- Works: Suffocation, Voracious Scourge, Inverted Matter,Synesis Absorption, Grimm Real

Mike Smith (born July 16, 1971) is an American musician, best known as the founding member and former drummer of the New York–based technical death metal band Suffocation. He performed on their 1990 demo Reincremated, the 1991 EP, Human Waste, their 1991 debut album Effigy of the Forgotten, and their 1993 album Breeding the Spawn. He then departed from the band and was subsequently replaced before the band's departure from the scene in 1998. Smith returned when Suffocation reformed in 2002 after a four-year hiatus and performed on their 2004 release, Souls to Deny, their 2006 self-titled album, and 2009's Blood Oath. Smith was Inducted into the Long Island Music Hall of Fame as a member of Suffocation in 2011. Smith left Suffocation for the second time in February 2012.

Smith is a drum instructor and hired studio musician. He has lent his drumming to the song "Dawn of a Golden Age" on Roadrunner United: The All Star Sessions, underground rapper Necro for his album Death Rap and experimental Louisiana based metal act Psychometry. Smith has his own horrorcore-influenced rap project called GRIMM REAL The first underground full-length for the Grimm Real project was released in 1999 titled Demise of the Clones. In 2014, Smith recorded drums for the German extreme-metal band Misanthrope Monarch and their debut EP. Smith has since completed full-length albums with bands Voracious Scourge U.S.A, Inverted Matter from Italy, as well as two studio songs with side project Synesis Absorption U.S. Grimm Real is Smiths' current and active project.

== Endorsements ==
Smith is currently endorsed by the following companies:

- Meinl cymbals
- Axis Percussion
- Vic Firth
- Evans Drumheads
- Ddrum
- dB Drum Shoes
- Sick Drummer Magazine
- DEDREP
