= Terrance Hobbs =

American guitarist

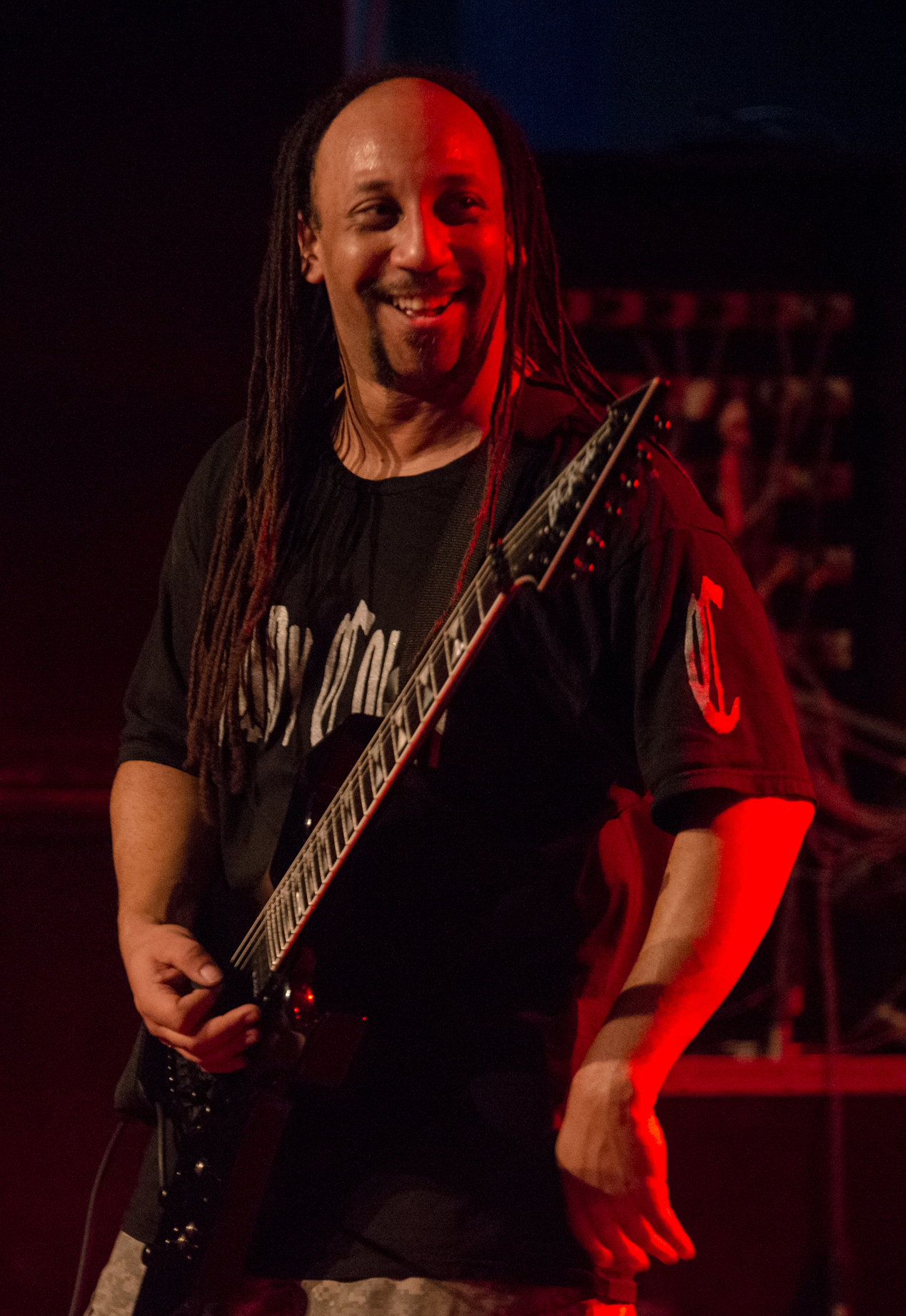
- Hobbs at the 2014 Free & Easy Festival

Background information
- Born: April 6, 1970 (age 56)
- Origin: Selden, Long Island, New York, U.S.
- Genres: Death metal, technical death metal
- Occupation: Guitarist
- Member of: Suffocation

Terrance Hobbs (born April 6, 1970) is an American musician best known as the lead guitarist of the death metal band Suffocation. He has been a constant member in the band since their first released title, Reincremated. Hobbs also played in the deathgrind project Criminal Element, which featured fellow Suffocation member Derek Boyer.

== Artistry ==
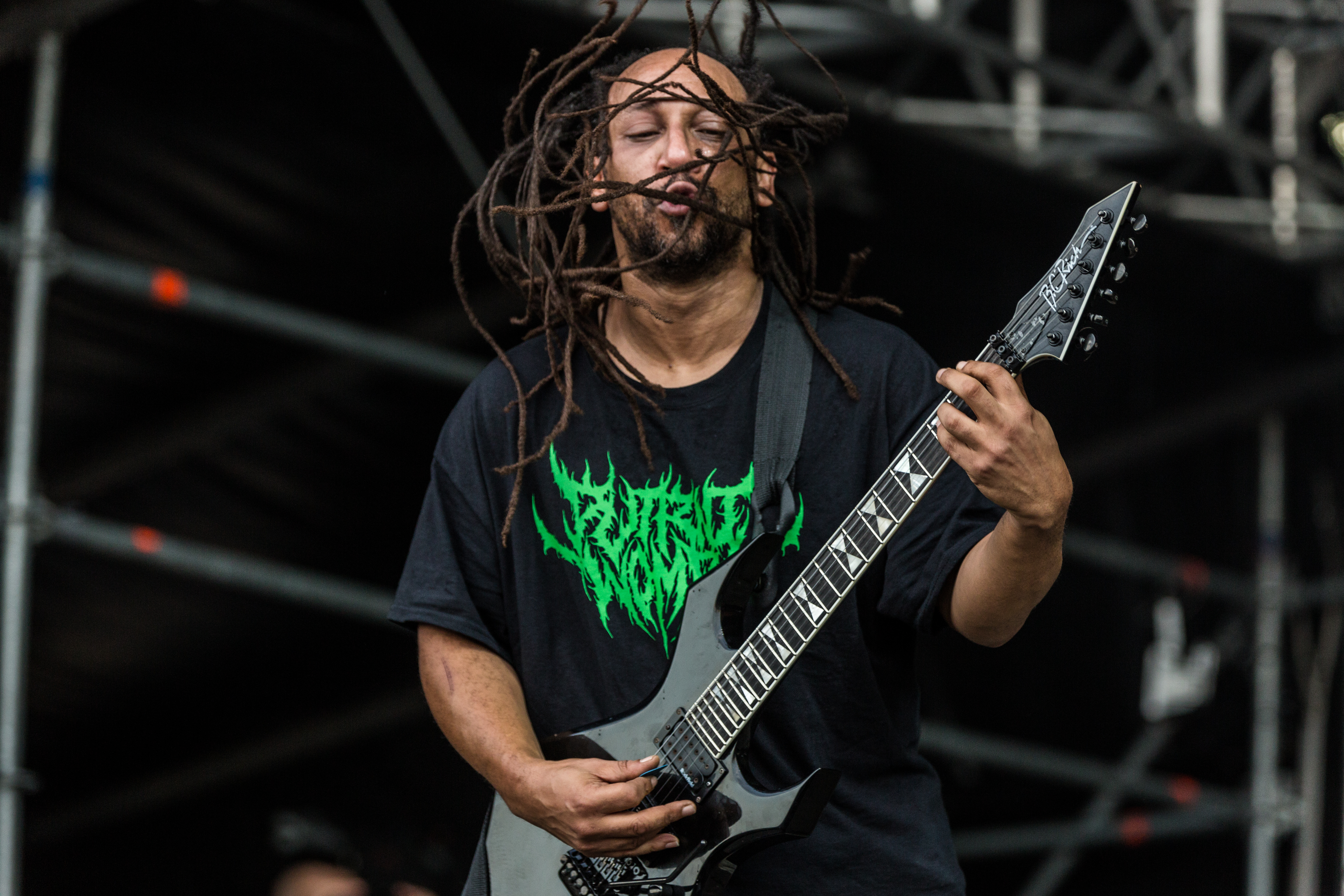
Hobbs performing in 2017

Hobbs is noted within the extreme metal community for his combination of fast and repetitive barred riffing accompanied by other swept and often technical unexpected patterns. This approach laid down the basics of what would eventually be considered technical/brutal death metal. He said: "as bands started to get progressively faster, our ears really liked that, and I think we thought it was fucking stupendous."

Typically, his shred-heavy guitar solos are accompanied with tremolo use, usually in the form of divebombs, trills and other techniques. Pierced from Within contains many examples of this, with an array of atmospheric, palm-muted breakdowns and complex riffs, along with Effigy of the Forgotten and Souls to Deny.

Hobbs mainly uses a custom B.C. Rich Warlock installed with a Floyd Rose locking tremolo, a DiMarzio Super Distortion bridge pickup, Gotoh tuners, and fitted with D'Addario strings. His pedals include a Maxon OD-9 overdrive pedal, and a Boss NS-2 Noise Suppressor. His amplification consists of a Peavey 6505+ played through Vader cabinets.
