= Army of the Pharaohs discography =

- Studio albums: 5
- EPs: 1
- Compilation albums: 3
- Mixtapes: 2

This is the discography of Army of the Pharaohs, an American underground hip hop collective originating from Philadelphia, Pennsylvania.

== Albums ==
=== Studio albums ===
Title	Album details
The Torture Papers	Released: March 21, 2006; Label: Babygrande; Format: CD, LP, digital download
Ritual of Battle	Released: September 25, 2007; Label: Babygrande; Format: CD, LP, digital download
The Unholy Terror	Released: March 30, 2010; Label: Enemy Soil, Babygrande; Format: CD, LP, digital download
In Death Reborn	Released: April 22, 2014; Label: Enemy Soil, The Orchard; Format: CD, LP, digital download
Heavy Lies the Crown	Released: October 21, 2014; Label: Enemy Soil, The Orchard; Format: CD, LP, digital download

=== Compilation albums ===
Title	Album details
Rare Shit, Collabos and Freestyles	Released: 2003; Label: Self-released; Format: CD, digital download
The Pharaoh Philes	Released: June 14, 2010; Label: Babygrande; Format: CD, digital download
The Best of Army of the Pharaohs	Released: December 2, 2016; Label: Babygrande; Format: CD, digital download

== Extended plays ==
Title	EP details
The Five Perfect Exertions	Released: 1998; Label: Superegular; Format: CD, LP, digital download

== Mixtapes ==
Title	Mixtape details
The Bonus Papers	Released: 2006; Label: Self-released; Format: CD, digital download
After Torture There's Pain	Released: 2007; Label: Babygrande; Format: CD, digital download

== Guest appearances ==
Title	Year	Artist(s)	Album
"This is War"	2004	7L & Esoteric (feat. Army of the Pharaohs)	DC2: Bars of Death
"Mayhem"	2008	King Syze (feat. Army of the Pharaohs)	The Labor Union
"Army of the Godz"	2011	Apathy (feat. Esoteric, Blacastan, Reef the Lost Cauze, Planetary, Crypt the Warchild, Motive, Celph Titled and Vinnie Paz)	Honkey Kong
"Battle Hymn"	2012	Vinnie Paz (feat. Apathy, King Syze, Crypt the Warchild, Jus Allah, Esoteric, Blacastan, Celph Titled and Planetary)	God of the Serengeti
"Battle Scars (Pharaoh Overlords)"	2025	Vinnie Paz (feat. Army of the Pharaohs)	God Sent Vengeance
