= Vinnie Paz discography =

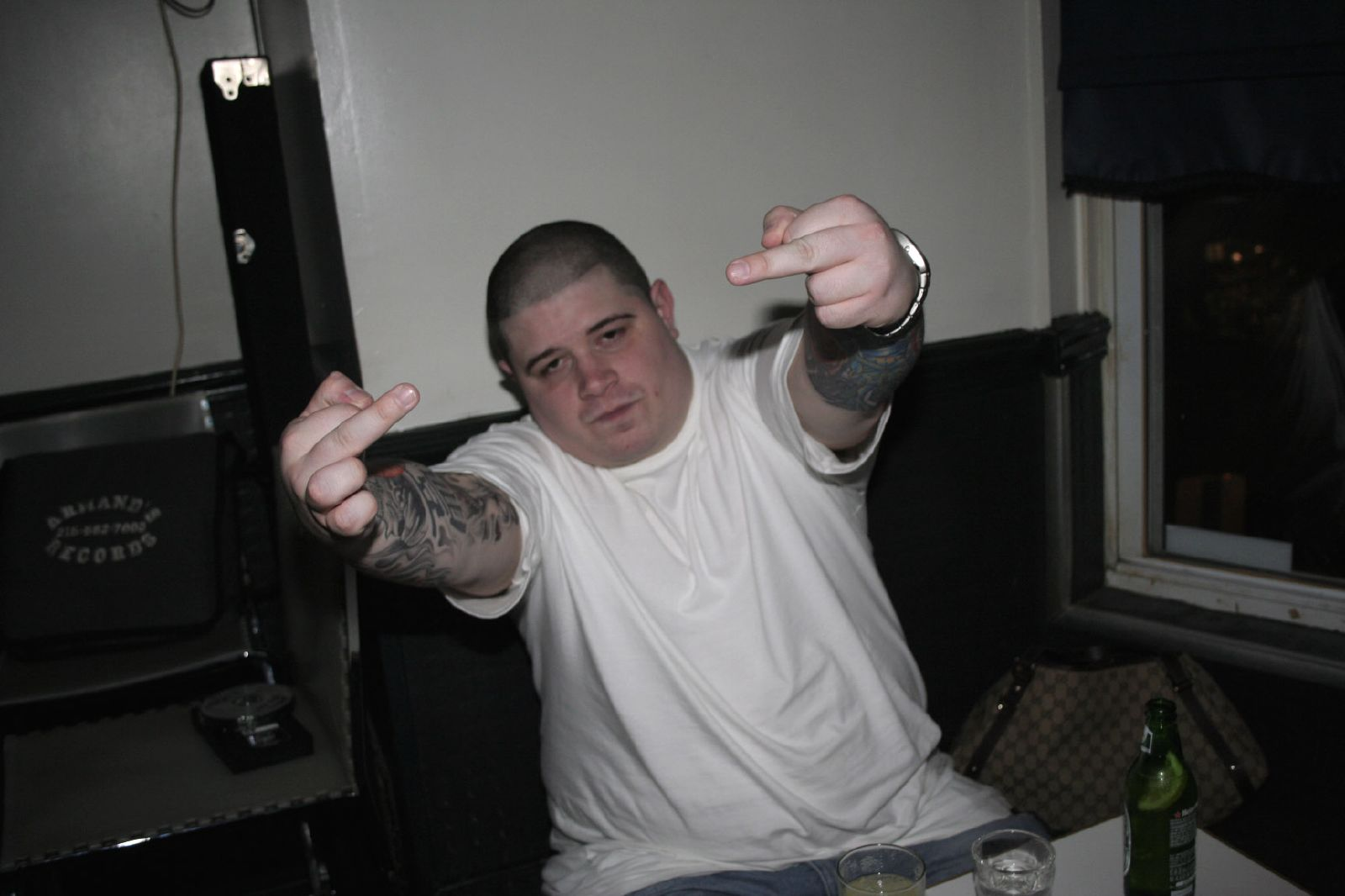
- Paz in 2012
- Studio albums: 9
- EPs: 3
- Compilation albums: 2
- Mixtapes: 9
- Collaborative albums: 3

This is the discography of Vinnie Paz, an American rapper from Philadelphia, Pennsylvania.

== Albums ==
=== Studio albums ===
| Title | Album details | Peak chart positions | | |
| Title | Album details | US | US R&B | US Rap |
|---|---|---|---|---|
| Season of the Assassin | Released: June 21, 2010; Label: Enemy Soil, The Orchard; Format: CD, LP, cassette, digital download | — | 44 | 25 |
| God of the Serengeti | Released: October 22, 2012; Label: Enemy Soil, The Orchard; Format: CD, LP, cassette, digital download | 102 | 16 | — |
| The Cornerstone of the Corner Store | Released: October 28, 2016; Label: Enemy Soil, The Orchard; Format: CD, LP, digital download | — | — | — |
| The Pain Collector | Released: September 28, 2018; Label: Enemy Soil, Fat Beats; Format: CD, LP, digital download | — | — | — |
| As Above So Below | Released: February 14, 2020; Label: Enemy Soil, Fat Beats; Format: CD, LP, digital download | — | — | — |
| Burn Everything That Bears Your Name | Released: April 23, 2021; Label: Iron Tusk Music, Fat Beats; Format: CD, LP, cassette, digital download | — | — | — |
| Tortured in the Name of God's Unconditional Love | Released: November 18, 2022; Label: Iron Tusk Music, Fat Beats; Format: CD, LP, cassette, digital download | — | — | — |
| All Are Guests in the House of God | Released: November 17, 2023; Label: Iron Tusk Music, Fat Beats; Format: CD, LP, cassette, digital download | — | — | — |
| God Sent Vengeance | Released: April 25, 2025; Label: Iron Tusk Music; Format: CD, LP, digital download | — | — | — |

=== Collaborative albums ===
| Title | Album details | Peak chart positions | | |
| Title | Album details | US | US R&B | US Rap |
|---|---|---|---|---|
| Heavy Metal Kings (with Ill Bill as Heavy Metal Kings) | Released: April 5, 2011; Label: Enemy Soil, Uncle Howie; Format: CD, LP, digital download | — | 48 | 24 |
| Black God White Devil (with Ill Bill as Heavy Metal Kings) | Released: October 27, 2017; Label: Enemy Soil, Uncle Howie, The Orchard; Format: CD, LP, digital download | — | — | — |
| Camouflage Regime (with Tragedy Khadafi) | Released: April 12, 2019; Label: Enemy Soil, Fat Beats; Format: CD, LP, digital download | — | — | — |

=== Compilation albums ===
| Title | Album details |
|---|---|
| The Essential Collabo Collection Volume 1 | Released: 2016; Label: Babygrande; Format: CD, digital download |
| The Essential Collabo Collection Volume 2 | Released: 2016; Label: Babygrande; Format: CD, digital download |

== Extended plays ==
| Title | EP details |
|---|---|
| Prayer for the Assassin | Released: October 26, 2010; Label: Enemy Soil; Format: Digital download |
| Carry On Tradition | Released: October 29, 2013; Label: Enemy Soil, The Orchard; Format: CD, LP, cassette, digital download |
| Jacinto's Praying Mantis | Released: June 21, 2024; Label: Iron Tusk Music; Format: CD, LP, cassette, digital download |

== Mixtapes ==
| Title | Mixtape details |
|---|---|
| Pazmanian Devil | Released: 2005; Label: Self-released; Format: CD, digital download |
| The Sound and the Fury | Released: 2006; Label: Babygrande; Format: CD, digital download |
| Before the Assassin | Released: 2010; Label: Self-released; Format: CD, digital download |
| Fires of the Judas Blood | Released: 2010; Label: Enemy Soil; Format: CD, digital download |
| The Priest of Bloodshed | Released: 2012; Label: Enemy Soil; Format: CD, digital download |
| Digital Dynasty 23 | Released: 2013; Label: Self-released; Format: CD, digital download |
| Flawless Victory | Released: 2014; Label: Enemy Soil; Format: CD, digital download |
| Savor the Kill | Released: 2020; Label: Enemy Soil; Format: CD, digital download |
| Lower the Blade | Released: 2022; Label: Self-released; Format: CD, cassette, digital download |

== Guest appearances ==
| Title | Year | Artist(s) | Album |
|---|---|---|---|
| "Chain Reaction" | 2001 | 7L & Esoteric (feat. Vinnie Paz) | The Soul Purpose |
| "Speak Now" | 2002 | 7L & Esoteric (feat. Apathy and Vinnie Paz) | Dangerous Connection |
| "The Omen" | 2004 | Block McCloud (feat. Vinnie Paz) | I Was Drunk When I Made This |
| "Urban Gorillas" | 2004 | Sabac Red (feat. Vinnie Paz and Q-Unique) | Sabacolypse: A Change Gon' Come |
| "Fire and Ice" | 2004 | OuterSpace (feat. Vinnie Paz) | Blood and Ashes |
| "Blades of Glory" | 2004 | OuterSpace (feat. Vinnie Paz) | Blood and Ashes |
| "Angels of Death" | 2004 | OuterSpace (feat. Immortal Technique and Vinnie Paz) | Blood and Ashes |
| "Blitz. Inc" | 2006 | King Syze (feat. Vinnie Paz and 7L & Esoteric) | Syzemology |
| "The Onslaught" | 2006 | King Syze (feat. Vinnie Paz, Sabac Red and Planetary) | Syzemology |
| "Silence" | 2006 | OuterSpace (feat. Vinnie Paz) | Blood Brothers |
| "Brute Force 2" | 2006 | OuterSpace (feat. Vinnie Paz) | Blood Brothers |
| "Kickback" | 2007 | Terror (feat. Vinnie Paz) | Rhythm Amongst the Chaos |
| "The Fusion Centre" | 2007 | Canibus (feat. Vinnie Paz) | For Whom the Beat Tolls |
| "Watch Your Step" | 2007 | Percee P (feat. Vinnie Paz and Guilty Simpson) | Perseverance |
| "The Wait Is Over" | 2008 | Doap Nixon (feat. Reef the Lost Cauze and Vinnie Paz) | Sour Diesel |
| "And Now" | 2008 | King Syze (feat. Vinnie Paz and Apathy) | The Labor Union |
| "A Bullet Never Lies" | 2008 | Ill Bill (feat. Vinnie Paz) | The Hour of Reprisal |
| "The Killing Fields" | 2008 | OuterSpace (feat. Vinnie Paz and King Magnetic) | God's Fury |
| "Dark of the Night" | 2009 | Freddy Madball (feat. Vinnie Paz) | Catholic Guilt |
| "Not Again" | 2010 | Diabolic (feat. Vinnie Paz) | Liar & a Thief |
| "OPG Theme" | 2010 | Reef the Lost Cauze (feat. Burke the Jurke and Vinnie Paz) | Fight Music |
| "Kill Devil Hills" | 2010 | Ill Bill & DJ Muggs (feat. B-Real and Vinnie Paz) | Kill Devil Hills |
| "Bare Knuckle Boxing" | 2010 | 7L & Esoteric (feat. Ill Bill, Vinnie Paz and Reef the Lost Cauze) | 1212 |
| "Eraserheads" | 2010 | Celph Titled & Buckwild (feat. Vinnie Paz) | Nineteen Ninety Now |
| "Man Made Ways" | 2011 | DC the Midi Alien (feat. Slaine, Trademarc, Vinnie Paz and Sabac Red) | Avengers Airwaves |
| "Landscapes" | 2011 | Slaine (feat. Reef the Lost Cauze and Vinnie Paz) | A World with No Skies |
| "Honkey Kong" | 2011 | Apathy (feat. Vinnie Paz) | Honkey Kong |
| "Army of the Godz" | 2011 | Apathy (feat. Blacastan, Celph Titled, Crypt the Warchild, Esoteric, Motive, Planetary, Reef the Lost Cauze and Vinnie Paz) | Honkey Kong |
| "Mossberg Solution" | 2011 | OuterSpace (feat. Vinnie Paz) | My Brother's Keeper |
| "Golden Casket" | 2011 | King Syze (feat. Vinnie Paz and Ill Bill) | Collective Bargaining |
| "Black Vikings" | 2011 | Immortal Technique (feat. Styles P, Vinnie Paz and Poison Pen) | The Martyr |
| "Deadly Sins" | 2011 | Doap Nixon (feat. Ill Bill & Vinnie Paz as Heavy Metal Kings, King Magnetic and Reef the Lost Cauze) | Doap Traffiking: The Rise and Fall of Darth Nixon |
| "Grand Opening (Remix)" | 2011 | Doap Nixon (feat. Reef the Lost Cauze and Vinnie Paz) | Doap Traffiking: The Rise and Fall of Darth Nixon |
| "My Universe" | 2012 | La Coka Nostra (feat. Vinnie Paz) | Masters of the Dark Arts |
| "Coka Kings" | 2012 | La Coka Nostra (feat. Vinnie Paz) | Masters of the Dark Arts |
| "Shoguns" | 2013 | Czarface (feat. Cappadonna and Vinnie Paz) | Czarface |
| "Death to You" | 2013 | Swollen Members (feat. Ill Bill & Vinnie Paz as Heavy Metal Kings and Slaine) | Beautiful Death Machine |
| "Sam Peckinpah" | 2013 | R.A. the Rugged Man (feat. Vinnie Paz and Sadat X) | Legends Never Die |
| "True Lies" | 2013 | Block McCloud (feat. Hasan Salaam and Vinnie Paz) | Four Walls |
| "Meditation" | 2013 | Brothers of the Stone (feat. Vinnie Paz) | Brothers of the Stone |
| "Come Back Down" | 2014 | Slaine (feat. Checkmark, Vinnie Paz and Regan Hartley) | The King of Everything Else |
| "If I Don't Go to Hell" | 2015 | Mr. Green (feat. Janice, Pacewon and Vinnie Paz) | Live from the Streets |
| "Take Hip Hop Back" | 2015 | Necro (feat. Vinnie Paz and Immortal Technique) | Sadist Hitz Volume 2 |
| "Crispy Innovators" | 2016 | La Coka Nostra (feat. Vinnie Paz) | To Thine Own Self Be True |
| "Biblical Proportions" | 2016 | Block McCloud (feat. Blacastan, V.Zilla and Vinnie Paz) | The Book Of Ishmael |
| "The House Always Wins" | 2017 | Stray from the Path (feat. Vinnie Paz) | Only Death Is Real |
| "Astral Traveling" | 2018 | Czarface & MF Doom (feat. Vinnie Paz) | Czarface Meets Metal Face |
| "Post Armageddon Interlude" | 2018 | Terror (feat. Vinnie Paz) | Total Retaliation |
| "Russo’s On The Bay" | 2019 | Ill Bill & Stu Bangas (feat. Vinnie Paz) | Cannibal Hulk |
| "Debbie Abono" | 2019 | Ill Bill & Sunday (feat. Vinnie Paz) | Pulp Phixion |
| "Still Got My Gun" | 2019 | Slaine (feat. Ill Bill, Rite Hook and Vinnie Paz) | One Day |
| "Murder Fantasia" | 2019 | Doap Nixon (feat. Vinnie Paz and Nita Ni) | Sour Diesel II |
| "Body Count" | 2019 | Doap Nixon (feat. Esoteric, Vinnie Paz and Reef the Lost Cauze) | Sour Diesel II |
| "The Slayers Club" | 2020 | R.A. the Rugged Man (feat. Ice-T, Vinnie Paz, Brand Nubian, Chris Rivers, Chino XL, M.O.P. and Onyx) | All My Heroes Are Dead |
| "Wolves" | 2020 | Ill Bill & Gorilla Nems (feat. Vinnie Paz) | Gorilla Twins |
| "Bora Bora Aura" | 2020 | Ill Bill (feat. Gorilla Nems, Tony Yayo and Vinnie Paz) | La Bella Medusa |
| "Can't Believe It" | 2021 | Paki Dunn (feat. Vinnie Paz, Ill Bill and D.V. Alias Khryst) | Tahi |
| "Supreme Magnetic" | 2023 | Ill Bill (feat. Vinnie Paz, Lord Goat and DJ Eclipse) | Billy |
| "Root for the Villain" | 2023 | Ill Bill (feat. Vinnie Paz and Kool G Rap) | Billy |
