= Syzemology =

Studio album by King Syze
- Released: May 30, 2006
- Recorded: 2005–2006
- Genre: Underground hip hop, hardcore hip hop
- Length: 58:30
- Label: Babygrande Records; Brick Records
- Producer: 7L, Arythmetic, Block McCloud, Cimer, Jon Doe, Joshue "AK" I. Cortes, November 17th, Showgun, Sound Scientist, Undefined

King Syze chronology
Syzemology (2006)	The Labor Union (2007)

Syzemology is the debut album by underground rapper and Army of the Pharaohs member King Syze. It was released on May 30, 2006.

== Background ==
The album features appearances from fellow Army of the Pharaohs members Vinnie Paz, 7L & Esoteric, OuterSpace, Reef the Lost Cauze, Des Devious & Block McCloud as well as verses from Sabac Red (formerly of Non Phixion) & Pumpkinhead. It also features production from 7L, Arythmetic, Block McCloud, Cimer, Jon Doe, Joshue "AK" I. Cortes, November 17, Showgun, Sound Scientist, Undefined.

== Track listing ==
No.	Title	Writer(s)	Producer(s)	Length
1.	"On a Mission"	Daniel Albaladejo	Sound Scientist	3:41
2.	"Blitz Inc." (featuring Vinnie Paz, 7L & Esoteric)	D. Albaladejo; Seamus Ryan; George Andrinopoulos	7L	3:14
3.	"Global Warming" (featuring Block McCloud, Pumpkinhead & Archrival)	D. Albaladejo; Ismael Diaz, Jr.; Robert Alan Diaz; Arch Rival	Block McCloud	3:59
4.	"O.E. Pounder" (featuring Des Devious)	D. Albaladejo; David Edens	Jon Doe	3:58
5.	"Roll out the Red"	D. Albaladejo	Jon Doe	3:41
6.	"Spittin' Heavy"	D. Albaladejo	Arythmetic	3:51
7.	"Who Gonna Ride" (featuring Rocky Reyes & Faez One)	D. Albaladejo; L. Reyes; Jon Hicks	Joshua "AK" I. Cortes	4:25
8.	"Truancy"	D. Albaladejo	Arythmetic	3:29
9.	"Da Storm" (featuring Iron Kong & Des Devious)	D. Albaladejo; A. Garcia; Edens	Cimer Amor	3:54
10.	"Band of Brothers" (featuring Crypt the Warchild)	D. Albaladejo; Marcus Albaladejo	Undefined	4:25
11.	"Machine Gun Rap"	D. Albaladejo; Andrinopoulos	7L	2:51
12.	"Reign of Tyrants" (featuring Poynt Blanc)	D. Albaladejo; Jay Lakos; Justin Ginsberg	Showgun	4:05
13.	"A Day After Tomorrow" (featuring Reef the Lost Cauze & El Dorado)	D. Albaladejo; Sharif Lacey; Lawrence MacMillan; Andrinopoulos	7L	3:39
14.	"Nonbelievers"	D. Albaladejo	Jon Doe	4:56
15.	"The Onslaught" (featuring Vinnie Paz, Sabac Red & Planetary)	D. Albaladejo; Vincenzo Luvineri; John Fuentes; Mario Collazo	November 17th	4:40
Total length:				58:48
