= Collective Bargaining (album) =

Studio album by King Syze
- Released: October 4, 2011; August 13, 2013 (EP)
- Recorded: 2010–2011
- Genre: Underground hip hop, hardcore hip hop
- Length: 68:42; 23:06 (EP)

King Syze chronology
The Labor Union (2006)	Collective Bargaining (2011)	Union Terminology (2014)

Collective Bargaining is the third studio album by underground rapper and Army of the Pharaohs member King Syze. It was entirely produced by Skammadix. An Extended Play version was released on to iTunes on 13 August 2013.

== Background ==
=== Definition ===
Collective bargaining is a process of negotiations between employers and a group of employees aimed at reaching agreements that regulate working conditions. The interests of the employees are commonly presented by representatives of a trade union to which the employees belong.

=== Album background ===
On 4 October 2011, King Syze released his third studio album Collective Bargaining. It featured Celph Titled, Esoteric, Planetary, Baby Blak, Burke The Jurke, Doap Nixon, Kev Turner Side Effect, Blacastan, V-Zilla, OuterSpace, Diabolic, Jus Allah, King Magnetic, Reef the Lost Cauze, Apathy, Chris Webby, Lawrence Arnell, Rockie Eyes, Poynt Blanc, M-Dot, Crypt the Warchild, Ill Bill, and Vinnie Paz and contained production work from Skammadix and scratches from DJ Kwestion. Collective Bargaining was not released on a label. An Extended Play version was released on to iTunes on 13 August 2013.

== Track listing ==
No.	Title	Producer	Length
1.	"Damage" (featuring DJ Kwestion)	Skammadix	3:46
2.	"The Ring of Fire"	Skammadix	3:29
3.	"Iron Work" (featuring Planetary, Celph Titled & Esoteric)	Skammadix	4:06
4.	"Live at the Beef and Beer" (featuring Doap Nixon, Burke The Jurke, Baby Blakk, Side Effect & Kev Turner)	Skammadix	5:59
5.	"King Maker"	Skammadix	3:06
6.	"Flash Flood" (featuring Blacastan & V-Zilla)	Skammadix	4:04
7.	"Sibling Rivalry (Part 3)" (featuring OuterSpace)	Skammadix	4:00
8.	"All Business"	Skammadix	4:05
9.	"The Strike Line" (featuring Diabolic, Reef the Lost Cauze, King Magnetic & Jus Allah)	Skammadix	4:36
10.	"Water to Wine" (featuring Chris Webby & Apathy)	Skammadix	4:00
11.	"Something Still Missing"	Skammadix	3:41
12.	"Rap for Real" (featuring Lawrence Arnell & Rocky Reyes)	Skammadix	3:59
13.	"Vicious Assault" (featuring Poynt Blanc)	Skammadix	4:04
14.	"Trench Music" (featuring Crypt the Warchild & P89)	Skammadix	4:00
15.	"History in the Making" (featuring M-Dot)	Skammadix	3:16
16.	"Stick to the Plan"	Skammadix	3:34
17.	"Golden Casket" (featuring Vinnie Paz & Ill Bill)	Skammadix	3:57
Total length:			68:42

EP Track listing
No.	Title	Producer	Length
1.	"Damage" (featuring DJ Kwestion)	Skammadix	3:46
2.	"The Strike Line" (featuring Diabolic, Reef the Lost Cauze, King Magnetic & Jus Allah)	Skammadix	4:34
3.	"Injunction"	Skammadix	3:25
4.	"Water to Wine" (featuring Chris Webby & Apathy)	Skammadix	3:57
5.	"The Ring of Fire"	Skammadix	3:27
6.	"Golden Casket" (featuring Vinnie Paz & Ill Bill)	Skammadix	3:57
Total length:			23:06
