= The Pharaoh Philes =

Babygrande Presents: The Pharaoh Philes

Compilation album by Army of the Pharaohs
- Released: 14 June 2010
- Genre: Hip Hop
- Length: 57:14
- Label: Babygrande

Army of the Pharaohs chronology
Rare Shit, Collabos and Freestyles (2003)	Babygrande Presents: The Pharaoh Philes (2010)

Babygrande Presents: The Pharaoh Philes (most commonly known as The Pharaoh Philes is the second compilation album from hip hop supergroup Army of the Pharaohs, it was officially released 14 June 2010. Artists including; Vinnie Paz, Apathy, Esoteric, Celph Titled, Des Devious, King Syze amongst others were all featured on the album.

Non members of the group including Snowgoons, Lord Digga and Random Luck were also featured on the album.

== Track listing ==
No.	Title	Artist(s)	Length
1.	"Blitz Inc."	King Syze (Feat. 7L & Esoteric and Vinnie Paz)	3:14
2.	"Heads Or Tails"	Snowgoons (Feat. Chief Kamachi, Jus Allah and Virtuoso)	3:36
3.	"And Now"	King Syze (Feat. Apathy and Vinnie Paz)	4:09
4.	"This Is War"	7L & Esoteric (Feat. Army of the Pharaohs)	4:12
5.	"Gods & Generals"	OuterSpace (Feat. Des Devious and King Syze)	4:11
6.	"Way Of The Gun"	7L & Esoteric (Feat. Apathy, Celph Titled and Lord Digga)	3:35
7.	"Warning Shot"	Doap Nixon (Feat. OuterSpace, King Syze & King Magnetic)	5:22
8.	"Raw"	Random Luck (Feat. Vinnie Paz)	4:55
9.	"Mayhem"	King Syze (Feat. Army of the Pharaohs)	5:47
10.	"The Wait Is Over"	Doap Nixon (Feat. Reef the Lost Cauze and Vinnie Paz)	3:48
11.	"Gods & Generals 2"	OuterSpace (Feat. Des Devious and King Syze)	4:11
12.	"The Onslaught"	King Syze (Feat. Planetary, Sabac and Vinnie Paz)	4:57
