= The Labor Union =

Studio album by King Syze
- Released: August 5, 2008
- Recorded: 2006–2008
- Studio: Found Sound Recording (Philadelphia, PA)
- Genre: Underground hip hop; hardcore hip hop
- Label: Babygrande
- Producer: DJ Waxwork; Ill Bill; MTK; Sake; Sicknature; Skammadix; Team 707; Tut the Instrumentalist; Undefined

King Syze chronology
Syzemology (2006)	The Labor Union (2008)	Collective Bargaining (2011)

Professional ratings
Review scores
Source	Rating
PopMatters	5/10
RapReviews	8/10

The Labor Union is the second solo studio album by American underground rapper King Syze. It was officially released on August 5, 2008, via Babygrande Records. Recording sessions took place at Found Sound Recording in Philadelphia. Production was handled by Team 707, MTK, Skammadix, DJ Waxwork, Ill Bill, Sake, Sicknature, Tut the Instrumentalist and Undefined, with Chuck Wilson and Vinnie Paz serving as executive producers. It features guest appearances from several Army of the Pharaohs members and Ill Bill.

== Critical reception ==
The album was known for "[Syze] lacing his relentless, rapid-fire flow over a slew of spine-tingling gutter tracks". AllMusic's Matt Rinaldi called it an "underground classic".

== Track listing ==
No.	Title	Writer(s)	Producer(s)	Length
1.	"The Labor Union"	Daniel Albaladejo; B. Coles; Olivier Blanger; Stéphane Gourdais	707 Team Productions	3:42
2.	"The Best"	D. Albaladejo; Kris Rey	Skammadix	4:04
3.	"Play Ya Part (P.Y.P.)" (featuring Doap Nixon and Ill Bill)	D. Albaladejo; Kenneth Greene; William Braunstein; J. Munk Andersen	Ill Bill; Sicknature	3:56
4.	"Creep Show" (featuring Lawrence Arnell and King Magnetic)	D. Albaladejo; Lawrence Macmillen; Jason Faust; Rey	Skammadix	4:13
5.	"Love Vs. Hate"	D. Albaladejo; Coles; Blanger; Gourdais	707 Team Productions	3:06
6.	"Cement Work"	D. Albaladejo; Julian Hammer	DJ Waxwork	3:29
7.	"Haters Beware" (featuring Planetary)	D. Albaladejo; Mario Collazo; Coles; Blanger; Gourdais	707 Team Productions	3:34
8.	"Mayhem" (featuring Army of the Pharaohs)	D. Albaladejo; Collazo; Jose Vargas; David Edens; Edward Littlepage; Victor Mercer; Greene; Seamus Ryan; R. Joyce	Sake	5:47
9.	"That's How You Rap"	D. Albaladejo; M. Henzey	Undefined	3:25
10.	"And Now" (featuring Vinnie Paz and Apathy)	D. Albaladejo; Vincenzo Luvineri; Chad Bromley; C. Ashton	Tut the Instrumentalist	4:09
11.	"Pain"	D. Albaladejo; Coles; Blanger; Gourdais	707 Team Productions	3:17
12.	"Sibling Rivalry Pt. 2" (featuring OuterSpace)	D. Albaladejo; Marcus Albaladejo; Collazo; Matthew Crabtree	MTK	3:50
13.	"Reality Check"	D. Albaladejo; Crabtree	MTK	2:24

== Personnel ==
- Daniel "King Syze" Albaladejo – vocals
- Kenneth "Doap Nixon" Greene – vocals (tracks: 3, 8)
- William "Ill Bill" Braunstein – vocals & producer (track 3)
- Lawrence Arnell MacMillan – vocals (track 4)
- Jason "King Magnetic" Faust – vocals (track 4)
- Mario "Planetary" Collazo – vocals (tracks: 7, 8, 12)
- Jose "Demoz" Vargas – vocals (track 8)
- David "Des Devious" Edens – vocals (track 8)
- Edward "Chief Kamachi" Littlepage – vocals (track 8)
- Victor "Celph Titled" Mercer – vocals (track 8)
- Seamus "Esoteric" Ryan – vocals (track 8)
- Vincenzo "Vinnie Paz" Luvineri – vocals (track 10), executive producer
- Chad "Apathy" Bromley – vocals (track 10)
- Marcus "Crypt the Warchild" Albaladejo – vocals (track 12)
- B. Coles – producer (tracks: 1, 5, 7, 11)
- Olivier Blanger – producer (tracks: 1, 5, 7, 11)
- Stéphane Gourdais – producer (tracks: 1, 5, 7, 11)
- Kris "Skammadix" Rey – producer (tracks: 2, 4)
- Jeppe "Sicknature" Andersen – producer (track 3)
- Julian "DJ Waxwork" Hammer – producer (track 6)
- R. "Sake" Joyce – producer (track 8)
- M. "Undefined" Henzey – producer (track 9)
- C. "Tut the Instrumentalist" Ashton – producer (track 10)
- Matthew "MTK" Crabtree – producer (tracks: 12, 13)
- Scott "Supe" Stallone – recording (tracks: 1–5, 7–12), mixing (tracks: 8, 10)
- Jeff "Stress" Davis – recording (tracks: 6, 13), mixing (tracks: 1–4, 6, 7, 9, 12, 13)
- Hakeem for 707 Team Productions – mixing (tracks: 5, 11)
- Mark B. Christensen – mastering
- Charles "Chuck" Wilson Jr. – executive producer
- Dan Bradley – photography, design
- Jesse Stone – marketing
- Ben Dotson – product management
- Willy Friedman – product management
