= Blood and Ashes =

Studio album by OuterSpace
- Released: July 27, 2004
- Studio: Old Dover Studios (Boston, MA); Fresh Tracks Studio (Philadelphia, PA)
- Genre: Hip hop
- Length: 49:24
- Label: Babygrande
- Producer: 7L; Arythmetic; Beyonder; Celph Titled; DJ Jon Doe; DJ Sat-One; Panik; Shuko

OuterSpace chronology
Outerspace (2004)	Blood and Ashes (2004)	Blood Brothers (2006)

Professional ratings
Review scores
Source	Rating
AllHipHop	3.5/5 stars
AllMusic	3/5 stars
HipHopDX	7/10
laut.de	3/5 stars
Prefix	6/10
RapReviews	8/10

Blood and Ashes is the debut full-length studio album by American hip hop duo OuterSpace. It was released on July 27, 2004, via Babygrande Records. Recording sessions took place at Old Dover Studios in Boston and at Fresh Tracks Studio in Philadelphia. Production was handled by 7L, Arythmetic, Beyonder, Celph Titled, DJ Jon Doe, DJ Sat-One, Panik, Shuko, with DJ Tinkerman serving as co-producer. It features guest appearances from Vinnie Paz, 7L & Esoteric, Celph Titled, Des Devious, Immortal Technique, King Syze, Sadat X and El Dorado.

== Track listing ==
No.	Title	Writer(s)	Producer(s)	Length
1.	"Intro"		Shuko	0:37
2.	"Brute Force"	Mario Collazo; Marcus Albaladejo; Braun Duggan	Beyonder	2:41
3.	"Fire and Ice" (featuring Vinnie Paz)	Collazo; M. Albaladejo; Vincenzo Luvineri; George Andrinopoulos	7L	4:02
4.	"Chrome Depot" (Skit)			0:57
5.	"The Revolution" (featuring Celph Titled)	Collazo; M. Albaladejo; Vic Mercer	Celph Titled	3:17
6.	"Cutthroats"	Collazo; M. Albaladejo; Jim Thorpe	DJ Sat-One	3:31
7.	"Top Shelf" (featuring Sadat X)	Collazo; M. Albaladejo; Derek Murphy; Christoph Bauss	Shuko	3:43
8.	"Is What It Is"	Collazo; M. Albaladejo; Andrinopoulos	7L	3:24
9.	"Gods and Generals" (featuring King Syze & Des Devious)	Collazo; M. Albaladejo; Daniel Albaladejo; David Edens; Jon Foster	DJ Jon Doe	4:11
10.	"Immature" (Skit)			0:23
11.	"Chapter of Thunder"	Collazo; M. Albaladejo; Bauss	Shuko; DJ Tinkerman (co.)	3:34
12.	"Raw Deal"	Collazo; M. Albaladejo; Edward Zamudio	Panik	4:23
13.	"Blades of Glory" (featuring Vinnie Paz)	Collazo; M. Albaladejo; Luvineri; Zamudio	Panik	3:13
14.	"Whatever It Takes" (featuring El Dorado)	Collazo; M. Albaladejo; Lawrence MacMillan; Bradley McNaughton	Arythmetic	3:47
15.	"Far Greater" (featuring 7L & Esoteric)	Collazo; M. Albaladejo; Seamus Ryan; Andrinopoulos	7L	3:15
16.	"Angels of Death" (featuring Immortal Technique & Vinnie Paz)	Collazo; M. Albaladejo; Felipe Coronel; Luvineri; Bauss	Shuko	4:26
Total length:				49:24

== Personnel ==
- Mario "Planetary" Collazo – vocals, sleeve notes
- Marcus "Crypt the Warchild" Albaladejo – vocals, sleeve notes
- Vincenzo "Vinnie Paz" Luvineri – additional vocals (tracks: 3, 16), vocals (track 13), executive producer
- Victor "Celph Titled" Mercer – vocals & producer (track 5)
- Derek "Sadat X" Murphy – vocals (track 7)
- Daniel "King Syze" Albaladejo – vocals (track 9)
- David "Des Devious" Edens – vocals (track 9)
- Lawrence Arnell MacMillan – additional vocals (track 14)
- Seamus "Esoteric" Ryan – vocals (track 15)
- Felipe "Immortal Technique" Coronel – vocals (track 16)
- Christoph "Shuko" Bauss – producer (tracks: 1, 7, 11, 16)
- Braun "Beyonder" Dugan – producer (track 2)
- George "7L" Andrinopoulos – producer (tracks: 3, 8, 15)
- Jim "DJ Sat-One" Thorpe – producer (track 6)
- Jon "DJ Jon Doe" Foster – producer (track 9)
- Edward "Panik" Zamudio – producer (tracks: 12, 13)
- Bradley "Arythmetic" McNaughton – producer (track 14)
- DJ Tinkerman – co-producer (track 11)
- Scott "Supe" Stallone – engineering & mixing (tracks: 3, 6, 12–14)
- Chris Conway – mixing (tracks: 7, 11, 16)
- Emily Lazar – mastering
- Sean Clarity – design, layout
- Dominic DiGiorgio – photography
- Chuck Wilson – coordinator
- Chase Jones – management
- Jesse Stone – marketing
