= M-Dot =

American rapper (born 1983)

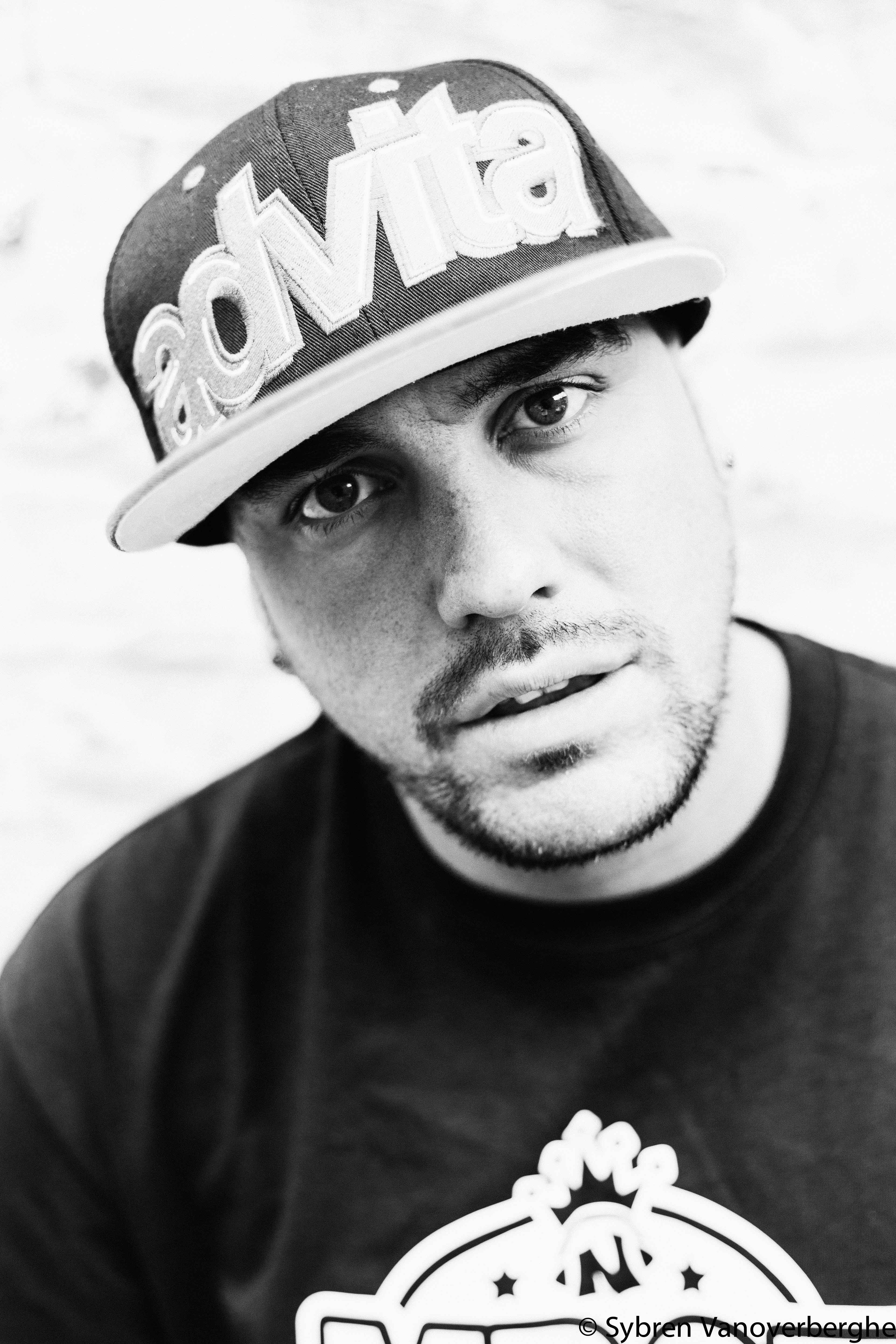
- M-Dot, during the Jake LaDotta Euro-Tour (2014)

Background information
- Born: Michael Januario; January 13, 1983 (age 43); Boston, Massachusetts, United States
- Genres: East Coast hip hop, hardcore hip hop
- Years active: 2001–present
- Labels: Soulspazm Records, Own Lane Music, EMS Productions, Commonwealth Records, Str8 Up Entertainment, Below System Records

Michael Januario (born January 13, 1983) better known by his stage name M-Dot is an American rapper and producer. Before becoming a rap musician, Januario played college basketball at BHCC, MCLA and Fitchburg State.

== Career ==
Born in Revere, Massachusetts, M-Dot initially gained expanded exposure when touring Switzerland as the opener for Lawrence rapper Krumb Snatcha (Gang Starr Foundation) in the mid 2000s. Frequent collaborations with respected rap groups, and consistently touring overseas, have built M-Dot's audience. On December 19, 2014 he dropped the single "Shine" featuring Dominique Larue, Katy Gunn and Wu Tang MC Method Man, it later appeared on his touted debut album "egO anD The eneMy" (released on 1/27/17). On December 30, 2017, renowned Hip-Hop outlet UGHH announced ‘egO anD The eneMy’ as the top selling release for the calendar year of 2017. The album which received critical acclaim, boasts a noteworthy production lineup with Marley Marl, Large Professor, Hi Tek, Marco Polo (producer), Buckwild, DJ 7L among others. On December 22, 2015, M-Dot & his visual team released a music video titled "123 Flow", the minute and a half long clip is one of the first fully interactive 360° music videos showcasing a 6-person replicant effect and upon release almost immediately went viral. On March 13, 2018 NBC crime drama The Blacklist used M-Dot’s audio single “True Lies” during episode 16 of season 5 titled “Capricorn Killer”. In February 2020 M-Dot released “The Atonement” produced by the legendary Pete Rock. On January 28, 2022, M-Dot released the album “Dining in Dystopia” featuring Elzhi, Kool G Rap, Conway The Machine, Large Professor, Esoteric (rapper), Big Shug & more. The album received high praise and glowing reviews from news outlets, blogs and radios including okay player, DigBoston & shade 45. On June 17, 2022 logic (rapper) released his album Vinyl Days on Def Jam, the lead single with DJ Premier, also titled Vinyl Days, featured vocal samples from M-Dot for the tracks chorus and outro. In 2023 ‘Beats-Rhymes-Lists’ named M-Dot in their Top Ten Boston Rappers of ALL TIME. The episode “Casualties Of War” from the STARZ show BMF (TV series) (Season 3) used M-Dot’s music, which aired on April 5th 2024.

In 2008 M-Dot was named to Stuff Magazines Hot 100. Also in '08 M-Dot shared the honor of "2 Dope 2 Sleep On" with Casey Veggies presented by 2dopeboyz.com. He went on to receive positive reviews for his mixtapes Money Doesn't Own Thought (2009) from DigBoston.com and Making Doubters Over Think (2010) from the Boston Globe. Continuing his European exposure, M-Dot performed at the 2010 Winter XGames in Tignes, France. For years he has solidified a fan base through local shows and mixtapes in New England. M-Dot won both major Boston hip-hop music awards in 2010: at the 22nd annual Boston Phoenix awards, Best Hip Hop Act, and at the 23rd annual Boston Music Awards, Hip Hop Artist of the Year. He then went on to win Hip Hop Dependency "Artist of the Year 2011"

M-Dot garnered more accolades for his first EP, a collaborative effort with DJ Jean Maron, Run MPC. The Run MPC single "You Don't Know About It" Ft. Masta Ace reached number 2 on RapAttackLives.com college radio charts and the 12 inch record finished fifth in vinyl sales in 2010 at undergroundhiphop.com.

His third installment in his acronym series, More Doubters Over Thinking, was also well received. In May 2012 in support of the release "Layer Cake," M-Dot embarked on a 33-day European tour with the likes of Slaughterhouse (group), Saigon (rapper) & El Da Sensei. The Layer Cake cd was also considered another example of acute lyricism. Layercake finds M-Dot weaving a go-for-the-gold battle-rap narrative over beats from young producers

The 2007 Cinematic feature "Street Team Massacre " used songs M-Dot created for the score. M-Dot can also be seen acting in the comical sitcom "What it is", which stars and is also produced by Makzilla & Krizz Kaliko. On October 11, 2012, M-Dot was featured on ABC's (New England WCVB) primetime TV show "Chronicle". Hip Hop Kemp, which is statistically one of the largest music festivals in Europe, named M-Dot, amongst others, to be a headlining performer at the events 18th edition (taking the stage August 24, 2018, in Hradec Králové, Czech Republic).

== Discography ==
=== Albums ===
- Run MPC (2010)
- EgO anD The EneMy (2017)
- Dining In Dystopia (2022)
- A Dissolute Paradise (EgO anD The EneMy 2) (2023)
- Daze Of Greed (2024)
- Library Of Sound (2025)
- Sky Reign EP w/ 38 Spesh & Co Defendants (2026)
- A Notebook With No Light (2026)

=== Mixtapes ===
- Money Doesn't Own Thought (2009)
- Making Doubters Over Think (2010)
- More Doubters Over Thinking (2011)
- Layer Cake (2012)
- Jake LaDotta (2014)
- KEMPilation (2018)
- Shine/Shine On w/ Method Man (2025)

=== Appearances ===
- DTR45 - “Gotta Be w/ Krumb Snatcha (Gang Starr Foundation)” from Rebel Radio 45, Album (2008)
- Snowgoons - “Hate on me w/ Krumb Snatcha (Gang Starr Foundation)” from Trojan Horse, Album (2009) Baby Grande Records
- Commonwealth Records presents - “No Money Down” from A Boston State of Mind (Compilation), Album (2010) Commonwealth Records
- Snowgoons - “The Real & The Raw w/ Jaysaun (Special Teamz)” from Kraftwerk, Album (2010) ihiphop Distribution/Goons MuSick
- DJ Doom - “False Acts” from Temple Of Doom, Album (2011)
- King Syze (AOTP) - “History in the making” from Collective Bargaining, Album (2011) Enemy Soil
- DJ Whiteowl - “Nothing To Fool With w/ Hell Rell (The Diplomats) & Benefit” from Drop that pt. 189 Holiday Hustlin' Edition 2, Mixtape (2011)
- DJ Duke (Assassin (rap crew)) - “Tap Out (Remix) w/ Big Shug (Gang Starr Foundation)” from Dirty Hands Vol 2, Mixtape (2011)
- Red Eye (The Closers) - “Unfukwitable w/ Ruste Juxx, Reks, Reef the Lost Cauze, Shabaam Sahdeeq, Sha Stimuli, Nutso” from St. Fatrick's Day, Mixtape (2012)
- DJ Brans - “Worldwide w/ Armageddon (Rapper) Terror Squad (group)” from BranStorm, Album (2012) Effiscienz
- DJ Brans - “DJ Brans All Starz w/ Nutso, Wildelux, King RA, B.A.M., DebOnAir, Wyld Bunch, Dirt Platoon, Blaq Poet & DJ Djaz" from BranStorm, Album (2012) Effiscienz
- DJ Grazzhoppa & Smimooz - "Think Twice (Remix) w/ Big Shug, Avirex, Singapore Kane, Krumb Snatcha", from Solid Vs. Gold, Album ('12 inch Vinyl LP) (2012) 9mm
- Snowgoons - “The Legacy w/ Esoteric, Ill Bill, Godilla, Fredro Starr (of Onyx), Sicknature, Punchline, Reks, Thirstin Howl the 3rd, Planetary (of Outerspace), Virtuoso, Maylay Sparks, Swann, Sav Killz & Reef The Lost Cauze" from Dynasty, Album (2012) Baby Grande Records
- DJ Doo Wop - “Gangster Aquarium" from Underground: Coast to Coast, Mixtape (2012)
- Snowgoons - "You Don't Know About it" (Remix) w/ Masta Ace, from This is Goons MuSICK, Mixtape (2012) Goons MuSICK
- DJ Grazzhoppa - "Introduction", from Intricate Moves 2, Album ('12 inch Vinyl LP) (2013) Chess Moves Cartel/Cheebawax/Island Def Jam Digital
- DJ Low Cut - "Visionaries w/ Jaysaun (Special Teamz), Nutso, Block McCloud, Blacastan, B.A.M, Chaundon, Tribeca & Shabaam Sahdeeq", from France Finest NY Minute Remix LP, Album (2013) Rugged Records
- Whatson - "Sold My Soul To Rock N Roll w/ Planetary OuterSpace, & Aims" (Produced By Whatson) from Detour EP (2013)
- Virtuoso (Army of the Pharaohs) & Snowgoons - "Ted Koppel w/ Vital Knuckles of N.B.S" (Produced By Snowgoons) from CoVirt Ops: Infantry, Album (2013) Goon MuSick/Big Bang Records
- Snowgoons - "Still Real And Raw w/ Jaysaun (Special Teamz) & Journalist 103” (Produced By Snowgoons) from Black Snow 2, Album (2013) Goon MuSick
- Revalation - "We're From Mass w/ Termanology" (Produced By Gajos) from Feature Presentation, Mixtape (2013) EMS Productions
- DJ Nefarious - “Ground Up w/ Edo G Undu Kati of EMS and DJ Djaz” (Produced by DJ Nefarious) from Classic Mindset, Album (2014) Self-Released
- Big Shug - "Showtime" (Produced By DJ Brans) from Triple OGzus, Album (2015) Brick Records
- DJ Stylus and AniPsal - "Back to it w/ Big Twins of Infamous Mobb & Dro Pesci” (Prod. By DJ Stylus) from Plowon (2016) Hiphop Regenerates
- Philly G & Quiz - “From the Bottom To the Top” (Produced By Quiz) from The Crib, EP (2017) Own Lane Music
- DJ Low Cut - “The Payback w/ Revalation & Mayhem of EMS” (Produced By DJ Low Cut) from Dead End, Album (2017) Rugged Records
- Superior - “Earn It w/ Revalation Of EMS” (Produced By Superior) from The Journey, Album (2017) Below System Records
- El Da Sensei ‘n Chillow - “H.R.M w/ Reap” (Produced By Chillow) from We Bring it live, Album (2017) Catharsis-Productions
- Mayhem & Soulslicers - "Patriots w/ Edo G & Big Shug” (Produced By Soulslicers) from Soul It May Seem, EP (Album Release TBD) (2018)
- DJ Stylus Mixtape pas si nase "RAP DAZE w/ Ras Kass & Revalation of EMS” (2018) Voisinage Clothes Brand
- DJ Brans - “Parisian Nights” (Produced By DJ Brans) from Out of Nowhere, Album (2018) Effiscienz
- Soulslicers - “Chances and Change Remix w/ Skyzoo, Revalation of EMS and DJ Decepta” (Produced by Soulslicers) from Black Album, Album (2018) Own Lane Music
- Soulslicers - “Late Homework w/ DJ 7L” (Produced by Soulslicers) from Black Album, Album (2018) Own Lane Music
- B Leafs - "Reaganomics w/ Elzhi, Ras Kass, & Large Professor” (Produced By B Leafs) from The Horizon, Album (2018) Masterpeace Recordings/ RareMinerals
- Guilty Simpson & Reckonize Real - “Can’t Run Away w/ Mayhem of EMS” (Produced By Reckonize Real) from Carved By Stone, Album (2018) Fat Beats
- Slim One - “No Mercy For Pigs w/ Ren Thomas & Superstah Snuk” (Produced By Slim One) from Iconic, Album (2019) TuffKong Records
- A.J. Munson - “Guilty w/ Ruste Juxx” (Produced by A.J. Munson) from Cigarettes and Coffee, Album (2019) Chopped Herring Records
- DZ The Unknown - “Thunder Slap w/ Celph Titled, Big Shug & Esoteric” (Prod. By C-Lance) (Album Release TBD) (2019) Real Human Records
- Panik of Molemen (producers) - “Biscuits” (Produced by Panik) from Coloring Outside The Lines, Album (2019) Molemen Records
- Big Shug - “Keep It Cool w/ B.A.M & International Dreez” (Produced by Lil Fame of M.O.P.) from The Diamond Report, Album (2019) Brick Records
- Big Shug - “No Real Rappers w/ Singapore Kane” (Produced by Reel Drama) from The Diamond Report, Album (2019) Brick Records
- Akrobatik - “Migrate” (Produced by LX Beats) from AKLX, Album (2019) KPC Records
- Kore & Quiz - “No Exceptions” (Produced by Kore) from Space Heaterz, EP (2020) Own Lane Music
- Roccwell - “Roadrunner“ (Produced by Roccwell) from Still Lovin‘ Boombap, Album (2020) Vinyl Digital
- G Stats (Bankai Fam) & Raf Almighty (Dirt Platoon) - “Chase The Dragon“ (Produced by Rawmatik) from The Ruler Gods, Album (2021) Kriminal Beats/Kush Gong Vinyl
- Freddie Black & Ras Beats - “Hands Up“ (Produced by Ras Beats) from Black Beats, Peyote Cookies And Late Nights, Album (2021) Worldwyde Recordings
- DJ Jean Maron - “Be Together w/ Raena“ (Produced By DJ Jean Maron) from The Candy Box, Album (2021) Soulspazm
- Bugsy H. - “Ski Lift w/ Fat Lip of the Pharcyde” (Produced By MindFrame) from The Sanctuary, Album (2021) HRS ENT
- Brutal Caesar - “Changing Of Times w/ Craig G of the Juice Crew & Doap Nixon of Army of the Pharaohs” (Produced By Brutal Caesar) from Caes Kalpurnia, Album (2022) Bruton Sounds
- Rico James - “Gold Medal Sh*t w/ Copywrite & Double A.B.” (Produced By Rico James) from Language Of Spirits, Album (2022) Man Bites Dog Records
- B Leafs - “Matatan w/ Estee Nack, Codenine & Al.Divino” (Produced by B Leafs) from The Synopsis, Album (2022) Masterpeace Recordings
- Dub Sonata - “Another Day w/ Revalation & Bobby J From Rockaway” (Produced By Dub Sonata) from Tranquilizer Dart, Album (2022) Man Bites Dog Records
- SoulRocca - “Toil“ (Produced by Roccwell) from In Good Company, Album (2022) Beat Art Department
- D’Vibes - “Superbad w/ Philly G” (Produced By D’Vibes) from The Book of D’Vibes, Album (2023) DVibes Productions
- Mista Sinista (The X-Ecutioners) - “My Love w/ Lateb” (Produced By Dead Poetz) from Reborn, Album (2024) Fat Beats
- CLOAQxDAGGER - “Cesspool w/ Lateb” (Produced By CLOAQxDAGGER) from Still Working, Album (2024) CLOAQxDAGGER
- Lateb - “Predators w/ Reks” (Produced By AnyWayWell Beats and The Arcitype) (2025)
- Leedz Edutainment - “Bear The Burden w/ Reef The Lost Cauze & Akrobatik” (Produced By DC The MIDI Alien) from Hard To Learn, Album (2025) Leedz Edutainment
- DJ Mirage - “Different Price w/ El Camino & Che Noir” (Produced By DJ Mirage) from Background Check, Album (2025)
