= The Five Perfect Exertions =

EP by Army of the Pharaohs
- Released: 1998
- Genre: Hip hop
- Length: 23:12
- Label: Superegular Recordings
- Producer: Stoupe the Enemy of Mankind, DJ 7L

Army of the Pharaohs chronology
The Five Perfect Exertions (1998)	Rare Shit, Collabos and Freestyles (2003)

The Five Perfect Exertions / War Ensemble is the debut extended play released by Army of the Pharaohs in 1998.

The original incarnation of the group included five MCs: Vinnie Paz, Chief Kamachi, Esoteric, Virtuoso and Bahamadia, along with DJ 7L and Jedi Mind Tricks producer Stoupe the Enemy of Mankind. The group released their debut EP/single "The Five Perfect Exertions" b/w "War Ensemble" in 1998. Both tracks were later included on JMT's 2000 album Violent by Design; with "The Five Perfect Exertions" being remixed into "Exertions Remix", and both "Exertions" and "War Ensemble" shedding Chief Kamachi's verse. The Army of the Pharaohs project was put on the back-burner while JMT's career took off.

== Track listing ==
No.	Title	Length
1.	"The Five Perfect Exertions (Dirty)"	3:36
2.	"The Five Perfect Exertions (Clean)"	3:37
3.	"The Five Perfect Exertions (Instrumental)"	3:36
4.	"War Ensemble (Clean)"	4:08
5.	"War Ensemble (Instrumental)"	4:07
6.	"The Five Perfect Exertions (Remix Clean)"	4:08
