= Lawrence Arnell =

American rapper and producer

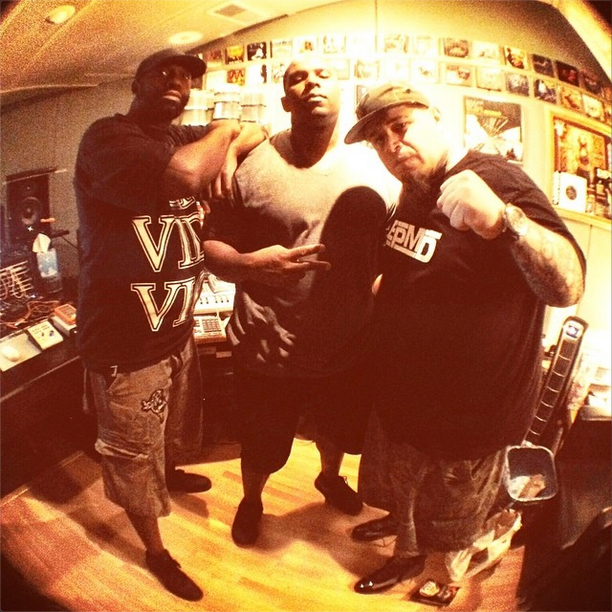
- Arnell (center) with Malik B. (left) and Vinnie Paz in 2014

Background information
- Also known as: Larry A Larry Legend; L. Dorado; Diamondback
- Born: Lawrence Arnell Macmillan
- Origin: Philadelphia, Pennsylvania, U.S.
- Genre: Hip hop
- Occupations: Rapper, producer
- Years active: 1995–present
- Label: Babygrande
- Member of: Army of the Pharaohs
- Formerly of: Deadly Snakes

Lawrence Arnell Macmillan is an American rapper and producer from Philadelphia, Pennsylvania. He first collaborated with hip hop group Jedi Mind Tricks on Violent by Design under the name Diamondback in 2000. In 2014, Arnell joined Army of the Pharaohs and appeared on their studio albums In Death Reborn and Heavy Lies the Crown.

== Biography ==
=== 1995–2006: Early career ===
Arnell started off his career as an MC and singer-songwriter. At 19 years old, he caught the eye of Tommy Boy Records as a member of the hip-hop collective Deadly Snakes. With dates on the Lyricist Lounge Tour, placements on the soundtrack to Jet Li's Black Mask film (1996) and a co-sign from Prince Paul, the Snakes seemed to be on the right track. Soon after, however, the group disbanded, following the release from their deal with Tommy Boy. Arnell fell back and sharpened his skills as an MC as well as a vocalist and songwriter.

In 2000, Arnell made a guest appearance on "Blood Reign" from Jedi Mind Tricks's Violent by Design under the name Diamondback.

In 2005, Arnell was featured on the track "Chicken Kitchen Chop-Chop Mix" by Nuthouse on their 12" vinyl Snap Your Neck 2 Dis. This is considered to be his first breakthrough as an underground artist.

=== 2007–2011: Breakthrough ===
In 2008, Arnell collaborated with King Syze on his second studio album The Labor Union. He was featured on the track "Creep Show". Later that year, fellow rap duo OuterSpace announced they were to release their third studio album God's Fury. Arnell was featured on the track "Quick Draw" along with Doap Nixon. In 2009, Jedi Mind Tricks frontman Vinnie Paz announced that he is working on his debut solo album Season of the Assassin, slated for a 2010 release. Arnell was featured on the track "Ain't Shit Changed". In 2010, Arnell featured a single titled "Nothin' Less" and featured JuJu Mob member Reef the Lost Cauze. A music video was released on YouTube on May 25, 2010. In 2011, Arnell was featured on Syze's third studio album Collective Bargaining on the track "Rap for Real". Underground rap artist Tygastyle released his album Father of the Year which featured the track "Dangerous Living" by Arnell. In 2012, Arnell provided vocals on the collaboration album by Pacewon and Mr. Green, The Only Number That Matters Is Won, on the track "Slow". Another notable feature of Arnell was in 2012, on the single "Stay True" by rapper Awar. The song was later included on the album Things of That Nature / Nature of The Beast.

=== 2013–2014: Other features and Army of the Pharaohs ===
Rapper Vinnie Paz released his second EP on October 29, 2013, titled Carry on Tradition. Arnell was featured on the songs "The Devils Ransom" along with Jarren Benton, and on "In the Middle of Nowhere". On November 30, 2013, Paz revealed that two new Army of the Pharaohs albums would be released in 2014. The first album, In Death Reborn, was announced for a release on April 22, 2014, followed by Heavy Lies the Crown in November. Arnell was announced to be featured on the album alongside new Army of the Pharaohs members Blacastan of the Demigodz and Houston-based rapper Zilla. Arnell was also featured on King Syze's fourth studio album Union Terminology on the songs "Union Goons" and "Business Agents", alongside Planetary.

== Discography ==
=== Studio albums ===
- 2014: The Monster and Mr. Arnell – with Zilla

=== Deadly Snakes ===
- 1999: Wild West / Culebras de Muerte

=== Army of the Pharaohs ===
- 2014: In Death Reborn
- 2014: Heavy Lies the Crown
