= A New Dope =

Studio album by 7L & Esoteric
- Released: June 27, 2006
- Studio: The Pterolab (Boston, MA)
- Genre: Hip-hop
- Length: 51:27
- Label: Babygrande
- Producer: 7L; Esoteric

7L & Esoteric chronology
Moment of Rarities (2005)	A New Dope (2006)	1212 (2010)

Professional ratings
Review scores
Source	Rating
AllMusic	4/5 stars
IGN	7.2/10
PopMatters	7/10
Prefix	8/10
RapReviews	6/10
Robert Christgau	A−

A New Dope is the fourth studio album by American hip-hop duo 7L & Esoteric. It was released on June 27, 2006, via Babygrande Records. Recorded and mixed at the Pterolab in Boston, self-produced, it features a lone guest appearance from Kool Keith.

The album featured primarily electro-influenced production rather than the boom bap sound typical of their other albums.

== Track listing ==
All tracks are written by Seamus Ryan and George Andrinopoulos.

No.	Title	Producer(s)	Length
1.	"Get Dumb"	Esoteric	3:06
2.	"Everywhere"	7L	3:13
3.	"Feel the Velvet"	7L	3:21
4.	"3 Minute Classic"	Esoteric	3:28
5.	"Daisycutta" (featuring Kool Keith)	Esoteric	3:31
6.	"Eso Ain't Shit"	Esoteric	2:56
7.	"Dunks Are Live, Dunks Are Dead"	7L	3:27
8.	"A.O.S.O."	Esoteric	3:51
9.	"Cemetery"	7L	1:45
10.	"Reggie Lewis Is Watching"	7L	2:07
11.	"Girls Gone Wild (Then & Now)"	7L	3:05
12.	"The Most"	Esoteric	3:23
13.	"Take Note"	7L	3:20
14.	"Perfect Person"	Esoteric	3:27
15.	"Play Dumb"	7L; Esoteric	4:45
16.	Untitled		2:42
Total length:			51:27

== Personnel ==
- Seamus "Esoteric" Ryan – vocals, producer (tracks: 1, 4–6, 8, 12, 14, 15), recording (tracks: 1–8, 10–15), mixing (tracks: 1, 4–6, 8, 14, 15)
- George "7L" Andrinopoulos – scratches, producer (tracks: 2, 3, 7, 9–11, 13, 15), recording (track 9), mixing (tracks: 2, 3, 7, 9, 11, 13)
- "Kool Keith" Thornton – vocals (track 6)
- Todd Spadafore – keyboards & bass (tracks: 2, 11), recording (track 9), mixing (tracks: 7, 9)
- C. Paragios – mixing (tracks: 2, 3, 11, 13), additional vocal equalizer (tracks: 4, 5, 8, 12, 15)
- A. Garcia – photography
- Trevor "KARMA" Gendron – package design
