= Union Terminology =

Studio album by King Syze
- Released: March 25, 2014
- Recorded: 2013–2014
- Genre: Underground hip hop, hardcore hip hop

King Syze chronology
Collective Bargaining (2011)	Union Terminology (2014)	Bloodaz (2017)

Union Terminology is the fourth studio album by underground rapper and Army of the Pharaohs member King Syze. Just like his previous album, Collective Bargaining, the album is produced entirely by Skammadix.

== Background ==
The album incorporates a diverse array of topics such as daily struggles, and working as a trade union member. The album is officially going to be released on March 25, 2014 and will be available for free for the first 1000 downloads. The album will be available on CD too. On 28 February 2014, Syze released the first single off the album titled; "Due Process". A music video was released the same day. The album contains guest appearances from Planetary, Reef the Lost Cauze & Lawrence Arnell.

== Track listing ==
On March 7, King Syze released the track listing for the album. All the songs were produced by Skammadix and all cuts were done by DJ TMB. The songs were mixed by Dave Humes.

Union Terminology
No.	Title	Featured Guest	Length
1.	"Intro"
2.	"Boilerplate Language"
3.	"Injunction"
4.	"Union Goons"	Lawrence Arnell
5.	"Due Process"
6.	"Grievances"
7.	"Fruit of Labor"	Reef the Lost Cauze
8.	"Mediation"
9.	"Business Agents"	Planetary & Lawrence Arnell
10.	"Last Chance Agreement"
11.	"Work Stoppage"
