= In Death Reborn =

Studio album by Army of the Pharaohs
- Released: April 22, 2014
- Recorded: 2012–2014
- Genres: Hip hop; horrorcore
- Length: 57:09
- Label: Enemy Soil
- Producers: Blastah Beatz; C-Lance; Vanderslice; Stu Bangas; Paul Nice; Frank Grimes; Leaf Dog; Apathy; Juan Muteniac; Panik; Lecs Beats; Grim Reaperz

Army of the Pharaohs chronology
The Unholy Terror (2010)	In Death Reborn (2014)	Heavy Lies the Crown (2014)

Singles from In Death Reborn
- 1. "God Particle" Released: March 11, 2014; 2. "Curse of the Pharaohs" Released: April 7, 2014; 3. "The Demon's Blade" Released: June 4, 2014

In Death Reborn is the fourth studio album by the underground hip hop collective Army of the Pharaohs. The album was released on April 22, 2014, via Vinnie Paz's independent record label, Enemy Soil. The album features members Vinnie Paz, Apathy, Blacastan, Block McCloud, Celph Titled, Crypt The Warchild, Demoz, Des Devious, Doap Nixon, Esoteric, King Magnetic, King Syze, Planetary, Reef the Lost Cauze and Zilla, with a guest appearance by Lawrence Arnell. The only member who did not appear on the album was Jus Allah, also affiliated with Jedi Mind Tricks; it was later confirmed that Allah had left both groups.

It was confirmed on February 11, 2014, that the album's production team included Stu Bangas, C-Lance, Leaf Dog, Panik and Army of the Pharaohs' Apathy, including new faces who had not produced for the group. To promote In Death Reborn, Paz released The Flawless Victory mixtape on March 2, 2014. Reef the Lost Cauze released a collaboration album, Fast Way, with producer Emyd on March 9, 2014. Although member Doap Nixon only appeared on "7th Ghost" due to personal issues, he said he would be more of a presence on the LP due for release in November. King Syze released his fourth studio album, Union Terminology, one month before the album's release. Apathy pushed back the release date of Connecticut Casual from April to June to favor In Death Reborn. A week before In Death Reborn's release, Zilla announced that he was working on Martyr Musick: his fourth studio album, scheduled for release in June 2014. In Death Reborn was one of the two albums that were stated to be released in 2014 by the group. The second being Heavy Lies the Crown which was released on October 21, 2014.

The album peaked at number 16 and 63 on the US Top R&B/Hip Hop Albums and Billboard 200 charts, respectively, and peaked on the UK R&B Albums chart at number 33. In Death Reborn received generally average-to-positive reviews. Online Rap album reviewer RapReviews gave the album a score of 5.5/10 crediting the production of the album as "solid rather than outstanding". HipHopDX gave it a score of 3.5/5 stating that the album preserves Hip Hop's Golden Era and asserts the groups current relevance. The Canadian music magazine Exclaim! rated it 7/10, describing the album as "a tough listen for some" but for those who are looking for "no-nonsense hard street music".

== Background ==
=== Pre-release ===
From left to right: Syze, Planetary, V-Zilla, and Paz.

Vinnie Paz announced on his Facebook page in early 2011 that In Death Reborn was due for release in 2012; however, the date was pushed back. Early in 2012, Houston underground MC Zilla and Connecticut's Blacastan were added to the group. Although rumors circulated on Facebook that Reef the Lost Cauze would not appear on the album, he tweeted on November 27, 2013, that these rumors were false and he would be making an appearance on the album. On April 12, 2013, a post on the AOTP Facebook page read: "New album is not finished. Don't know when it will be finished. Will let you know when there's a release date. No need for further questions." This caused frustration amongst fans as they had been waiting for the album for over a year. On June 27, 2013, AOTP frontman Vinnie Paz confirmed via Twitter that he is working on a new solo EP as well as a new Heavy Metal Kings and AOTP album. All of which is coming within the next year.

On October 4, 2013, Apathy announced that "Every AOTP album we've done in the past, we all handed in our verses via email and weren't too hands-on with it. This one is different. Every day we've been emailing each other, going over songs, picking beats and showing each other our verses. This might be the best AOTP album yet. It definitely is the illest, lyrically. We're all having brotherly competition and trying to murder each other on these songs. It's great."

On November 30, 2013, Paz said that two AOTP albums would be released in 2014; In Death Reborn was scheduled for an April release, and the second LP was confirmed for release on October 21, despite originally being scheduled for release in November. On February 11, 2014, Celph Titled confirmed on Facebook that In Death Reborn would be released on April 22, 2014.

=== Other projects ===
Many members of the group were working on and released other projects in addition to In Death Reborn, and the period was called "The Pharaoh Season". To promote In Death Reborn, Paz released The Flawless Victory mixtape on March 2, 2014. Reef the Lost Cauze released a collaboration album, Fast Way, with producer Emyd on March 9, 2014. Although Doap Nixon only appeared on "7th Ghost" due to personal issues and work on Sour Diesel 2, he said that he would be more of a presence on the November LP. King Syze released his fourth studio album, Union Terminology, a month before In Death Reborn's release. Apathy pushed back the release date of his album, Connecticut Casual, from April to June in favor of In Death Reborn. Former Pharaoh Jus Allah did not appear on the album, due to personal issues and was working on his second studio album, Meanest Man Alive . A week before the release of In Death Reborn, Zilla announced that he was working on Martyr Musick, his fourth album, which was pushed back to a 2015 release.

=== Album art ===
The first update the group released about In Death Reborn was the album art, which was leaked on the Jedi Mind Tricks website on February 11, 2014. The album art was designed by graphic designer and photographer Dan Bradley. Bradley (who had worked on the art since October 2013) also designed the cover of Heavy Lies the Crown, and had designed album art for AOTP members for nine years.

The album art differs from the group's other releases; instead of a pharaoh, there is a soldier wearing a gas mask. It was later said that the cover looked oddly familiar; it was drawn from the same stock photography bank as Punch's Frozen Memory mixtape cover, which was released in November 2013 and was considered to have inspired the album art. On September 28, 2018, Vinnie Paz released his album The Pain Collector, which featured the single "Gas Mask". Paz stated that the single was partially inspired by the album art of In Death Reborn.

== Singles ==
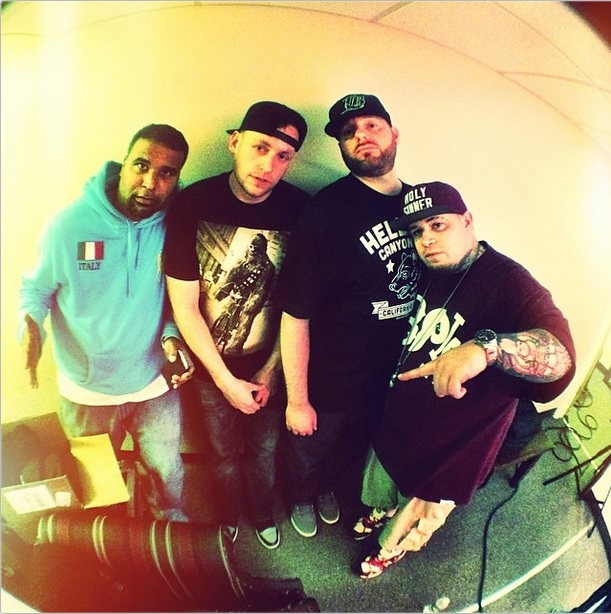
Doap Nixon, Esoteric, Celph Titled & Paz have made an appearance on all AOTP studio albums.

The group released their first single with a music video from the album on March 11, 2014; God Particle featured members Vinnie Paz, Planetary, Esoteric, Apathy and Celph Titled, and was produced by Stu Bangas with cuts by DJ Kwestion. The music video had appearances by other members, including Reef the Lost Cauze, Blacastan, Doap Nixon and Crypt the Warchild. The video was directed by Jimmy Giambrone and co-directed by Steve Perrong.

On March 31, 2014, Paz uploaded Army of the Pharaohs: Behind the Scenes to YouTube. The episode showed Army of the Pharaohs members behind the scenes as they filmed the video for "God Particle" and prepare to perform together in Philadelphia for the first time in years. On the launch of the album, the group released a remixed version of the single which was entirely remixed by Mr. Green and was available only on iTunes as a bonus track. The music video was directed by Sam-Lipman Stern.

Paz released the album's second single, "Curse of the Pharaohs", on April 7, 2014. The single featured Paz, Apathy, Celph Titled, Esoteric and Reef the Lost Cauze, and was produced by Blastah Beatz. The group released their third single, The Demon's Blade", and a music video on June 4, 2014. The music video contained scenes of Army of the Pharaohs performing worldwide onstage and scenes from Army of the Pharaohs: Behind the Scenes. The single featured Paz, Celph Titled, Apathy, Blacastan, Planetary and Esoteric, and was produced by Leaf Dog.

== Production ==
Celph Titled and Apathy provided vocals on 11 of the 14 tracks, and Apathy produced a track for the album.

In March 2014, producers Stu Bangas, C-Lance, Leaf Dog, and Panik were confirmed to produce the album. Bangas was affiliated with Army of the Pharaoh members since 2006, produced Doap Nixon's The Wait Is Over, and released a collaboration album with Blacastan and Machete Mode with Esoteric; he produced "God Particle". C-Lance, a long time affiliate with Jedi Mind Tricks, was one of two producers to produce more than one track: "Midnight Burial" and "See You in Hell". Vanderslice, another long-time affiliate with Army of the Pharaohs, produced "Broken Safeties". French production duo Crown and Supervillain produced "7th Ghost". It was their first collaboration with Army of the Pharaohs, although they had made a remixed version of Jedi Mind Tricks' "Street Lights".

The album was noted for its different beats, due to the number of producers. Frank Grimes produced the album's second single, "Curse of the Pharaohs", and its final song: "Sumerians". British producer Leaf Dog, former DJ of The Three Amigos, made his debut on the American hip-hop scene by producing the album's third single: "The Demon's Blade". Panik, one-fourth of the hip hop production team Molemen, collaborated for the first time with Army of the Pharaohs on "Ninkyo Dantai (Yakuza)". Other producers included Paul Nice, Juan Muteniac and Lecs Beats, none of whom who had previously collaborated with Army of the Pharaohs.

== Critical reception ==
Professional ratings
Review scores
Source	Rating
Exclaim!	7/10
HipHopDX	3.5/5 stars
RapReviews	5.5/10
AllMusic	4/5 stars

In Death Reborn received generally positive reviews from music critics. Mark Bozzer of Exclaim! gave the album a 7/10 rating, calling it "a hard-hitting slab of jacked-up fight music that combines aggressive beats with aggressive yet intricate wordplay." He gave praise to the producers of the album including the likes of underground and, as he described, "highly slept-on" producers Stu Bangas and Vanderslice. Both of whom crafted classics in Blaq Poet's 2011 Blaq Poet Society, amongst others. The mag described the group as dropping knowledge on songs that resemble a B Movie horrorfest in terms of track title and subject matters.

Omar Burgess of HipHopDX rated the album 3.5/5, saying that it had sufficient experimentation and raw talent to entice in casual listeners whilst still providing to its loyal fan base. According to Burgess, "Hardcore material representative of Hip Hop made in the mid-to-late '90s has been taking a beating in some circles." He critiqued the groups use of phrases like Rappity-Rap and Boom-Bap and how it epitomizes aggressive rap, infused with similes and metaphors stressed with sample-based production." Army of the Pharaoh's individual and collective careers originated from that era and the group rarely give off the impression of being threatened by this stigma. He went on to say that 16 years later, AOTP divides their time between concurrently conserving Hip Hop's Golden Era and affirming their current importance by competitively out-rhyming each other despite various lineup changes and over a decade of seeing rap change.

RapReviews' Grant Jones gave the album a score of 5.5/10, with a music vibe of 5/10 and a lyrical vibe of 6/10: Jones described his review as "harsh" but felt that this album summarises what Army of the Pharaohs has become, whilst still crediting the group as underground's most prominent supergroup and a modern example of underground hip hop. Even though the group has declared authenticity in their previous and individual albums, Jones described In Death Reborn as one that feels the "most manufactured" compared to all their releases. He added that the "production is provided by different producers on each song, and the vocals lack any real cohesion, almost as if each one was recorded on its own, emailed and pieced together." However, he embraced the groups' collaboration with Leaf Dog, whom he describes as one of the best British producers, for his work on "The Demon's Blade" as an explosive track that hits the listener after 15 minutes of "predictable, water-treading hip hop." Noting its resemblance to previous singles "Seven" and "Battle Cry" from earlier LPs. "Visual Camouflage" produced by Juan Muteniac was another noteworthy performance by Army of the Pharaohs according to RapReviews, as it appealed character and ultimately binding the rappers with a track "worth rewinding" whilst concluding that the rest of the album is decidedly average.

AllMusic's David Jeffries rated In Death Reborn 4/5. He praised the album as one that immediately feels old school due to significant participation from original member Esoteric. "That unapologetic, brutal dude attitude is in full force as "Midnight Burial" barks the lyrics 'I'm out to make a million/Kinda hard to do without pussies catchin' feelings' whilst the 13th track of the album "7th Ghost" threatens 'me peeling your grill off the front of our Hummer truck' because that's what gas guzzlers were made to do." In terms of production, Jeffries reviewed lead single "God Particle" as one that is a "new kind of stomping electro hulk" by Stu Bangas, whilst rapper and producer Apathy "puts a funky, harpsichord-driven ghost dance" below "Headless Ritual". He concluded by describing the album as "the flying death ball from Phantasm, driven by the hunger for blood and focused on looking for a forehead to lodge itself into".

== Track listing ==
No.	Title	Writer(s)	Producer(s)	Length
1.	"Curse of the Pharaohs"	Vinnie Paz; Apathy; Celph Titled; Esoteric; Reef the Lost Cauze	Blastah Beatz	4:03
2.	"Midnight Burial"	Reef the Lost Cauze; Crypt the Warchild; Esoteric; Des Devious; Celph Titled	C-Lance	4:21
3.	"Broken Safeties" (featuring Lawrence Arnell)	Apathy; Lawrence Arnell; Vinnie Paz; Celph Titled	Vanderslice	4:06
4.	"God Particle"	Vinnie Paz; Planetary; Esoteric; Apathy; Celph Titled	Stu Bangas	3:47
5.	"Luxor Temple"	Blacastan; Vinnie Paz; Apathy; Esoteric; Celph Titled; Planetary	Paul Nice	4:35
6.	"Azrael"	Block McCloud; Reef the Lost Cauze; Vinnie Paz; Crypt the Warchild	Frank Grimes	4:19
7.	"The Demon's Blade"	Vinnie Paz; Celph Titled; Apathy; Blacastan; Planetary; Esoteric	Leaf Dog	4:29
8.	"See You in Hell"	Celph Titled; Planetary; Blacastan; Vinnie Paz	C-Lance	3:29
9.	"Headless Ritual"	Blacastan; Apathy; Vinnie Paz; King Syze; Zilla; Planetary	Apathy	2:56
10.	"Visual Camouflage"	Apathy; Zilla; Vinnie Paz; King Magnetic; Celph Titled; Esoteric	Juan Muteniac	4:20
11.	"Ninkyo Dantai (Yakuza)"	Vinnie Paz; Celph Titled; Blacastan; Apathy; Esoteric; Planetary	Panik	3:38
12.	"Digital War"	Celph Titled; OuterSpace; Blacastan; Esoteric; Apathy; Vinnie Paz	Lecs Beats	5:03
13.	"7th Ghost"	Reef the Lost Cauze; Doap Nixon; Blacastan; Demoz; Vinnie Paz	Grim Reaperz	4:19
14.	"Sumerians"	Vinnie Paz; Blacastan; Apathy; Celph Titled; Esoteric	Frank Grimes	3:44
Total length:				57:09

iTunes bonus track
No.	Title	Writer(s)	Producer(s)	Length
15.	"God Particle" (Mr. Green remix)	Vinnie Paz; Planetary; Esoteric; Apathy; Celph Titled	Mr. Green	4:25
Total length:				61:34

== Personnel ==
Album credits adapted from AllMusic.

- Apathy — Composer, featured artist, mixing, producer
- Lawrence Arnell — Featured artist
- Stu Bangas — Producer
- Blacastan — Featured artist
- Blastah Beatz — Producer
- Dan Bradley — Layout
- Celph Titled — Composer, featured artist
- C-Lance — Producer
- Crypt the Warchild — Featured artist
- Demoz — Featured artist
- Des Devious — Featured artist
- Esoteric — Featured artist
- J. Faust — Composer
- Grim Reaperz — Producer
- Frank Grimes — Composer, producer
- Pete Humphreys — Mastering
- King Magnetic — Featured artist
- King Syze — Featured artist
- Leaf Dog — Producer
- Lecs Beats — Producer
- J. W. Leigh — Composer
- V. Luviner — Composer
- Block McCloud — Featured artist
- Juan Muteniac — Producer
- Paul Nice — Producer
- Doap Nixon — Featured artist
- Panik — Producer
- Vinnie Paz — Featured artist
- Planetary — Featured artist
- Reef the Lost Cauze — Featured artist
- Scott Stallone — Engineer, mixing
- Green Steez — Additional production
- Vanderslice — Producer
- J. Vargas — Composer
- Adrian Younge — Composer, sample source
- Zilla (also credited as V. Gurrola Jr.) — Composer, featured artist

== Chart positions ==
Chart (2014)	Peak position
UK R&B Albums (Official Charts)	33
US Billboard 200	63
US Top R&B/Hip-Hop Albums (Billboard)	16
US Top Rap Albums (Billboard)	9
Swiss Albums (Schweizer Hitparade)	64
