= Rare Shit, Collabos and Freestyles =

Compilation album by Army of the Pharaohs
- Released: 2003
- Genre: Hip hop
- Length: 63:31
- Label: Unlabelled

Army of the Pharaohs chronology
Rare Shit, Collabos and Freestyles (2003)	The Pharaoh Philes (2010)

Rare Shit, Collabos and Freestyles is the 2003 debut compilation album by underground supergroup Army of the Pharaohs. It contains various tracks from members of the group.

== Track listing ==
No.	Title	Artist(s)	Length
1.	"Intro"	Army of the Pharaohs	0:56
2.	"U Slept On"	OuterSpace	5:50
3.	"Incredible"	OuterSpace	3:58
4.	"Heavyweighters"	Vinnie Paz & Louis Logic	2:14
5.	"The Hunted"	Jedi Mind Tricks & Esoteric	3:32
6.	"Freestyle"	King Syze	1:02
7.	"Syzemology"	King Syze	4:05
8.	"Freestyle"	Crypt The Warchild	1:06
9.	"Suckas"	Supernatural & Vinnie Paz	4:10
10.	"Beatdown"	Virtuoso, Jedi Mind Tricks & T-Ruckus	3:55
11.	"Hotshit"	Planetary & King Syze	2:36
12.	"Young Lords"	OuterSpace	4:57
13.	"Speak Now"	7L & Esoteric, Vinnie Paz & Apathy	4:05
14.	"Liberal Arts"	Canibus & Jedi Mind Tricks	4:29
15.	"Freestyle 2"	Crypt The Warchild	1:18
16.	"Train of Thought"	OuterSpace	3:24
17.	"Freestyle"	Vinnie Paz	1:54
18.	"Final Frontier"	OuterSpace & The Last Emperor	3:13
19.	"Freestyle"	Apathy	1:23
20.	"Essays On Esoterrorism"	7L & Esoteric	3:06
21.	"Chrome Depot Freestyle"	Apathy & Celph Titled	2:24
