= Blood Brothers (OuterSpace album) =

Studio album by OuterSpace
- Released: August 22, 2006
- Studios: Found Sound Recording (Philadelphia, PA)
- Genre: Hip hop
- Length: 50:52
- Label: Babygrande
- Producers: 7L; Clockwork; DJ Kwestion; DJ Soundtrax; J-Zone; Low Key; Sake; Scott "Supe" Stallone; Team 707; Vanderslice

OuterSpace chronology
Blood and Ashes (2004)	Blood Brothers (2006)	God's Fury (2008)

Professional ratings
Review scores
Source	Rating
AllHipHop	3.5/5 stars
Now	4/5 Ns
Prefix	6/10

Blood Brothers is the second full-length studio album by American hip hop duo OuterSpace. It was released on August 22, 2006, via Babygrande Records. Recording sessions took place at Found Sound Recording in Philadelphia. Production was handled by 7L, Clockwork, DJ Kwestion, DJ Soundtrax, J-Zone, Low Key, Sake, Scott "Supe" Stallone, Team 707 and Vanderslice, with Vinnie Paz serving as executive producer. It features guest appearances from Vinnie Paz, King Syze, Royce da 5′9″ and Sheek Louch.

The album's lead single is "Street Massacre" b/w "U Don't Like Me".

== Track listing ==
No.	Title	Writer(s)	Producer(s)	Length
1.	"Blood Brothers (Intro)"	Mario Collazo; Marcus Albaladejo; R. Joyce	Sake	3:26
2.	"Reign of Chaos"	Collazo; Albaladejo; A. Decenzo	DJ Soundtrax	4:10
3.	"Spanish Fly"	Collazo; Albaladejo; B. Coles; Olivier Blanger; Stéphane Gourdais	707 Team Productions	3:45
4.	"U Don't Like Me" (featuring Sheek Louch)	Collazo; Albaladejo; Sean Jacobs; Ray Kline	Clockwork	3:59
5.	"The Boiling Point"	Collazo; Albaladejo; A. Grabowski	Low Key	3:39
6.	"Drive by Music"	Collazo; Albaladejo; Coles; Blanger; Gourdais	707 Team Productions	3:20
7.	"Silence" (featuring Vinnie Paz)	Collazo; Albaladejo; Vincenzo Luvineri; Joyce	Sake	3:23
8.	"Grown Ass Man"	Collazo; Albaladejo; Dave Klein	DJ Kwestion	4:08
9.	"Altered Beasts"	Collazo; Albaladejo; Jay Mumford	J-Zone	2:15
10.	"Street Massacre" (featuring Royce Da 5'9")	Collazo; Albaladejo; Ryan Montgomery; Joyce	Sake	3:50
11.	"Time Will Tell"	Collazo; Albaladejo; Kline	Clockwork	3:43
12.	"Hustle and Flow" (featuring King Syze)	Collazo; Albaladejo; George Andrinopoulos	7L	4:13
13.	"The Last Laugh"	Collazo; Albaladejo; Eric Vanderslice	Vanderslice	3:03
14.	"Brute Force 2" (featuring Vinnie Paz)	Collazo; Albaladejo; Luvineri; Scott Stalone	Scott "Supe" Stallone	3:58
Total length:				50:52

== Personnel ==
- Mario "Planetary" Collazo – vocals
- Marcus "Crypt the Warchild" Albaladejo – vocals
- Sean "Sheek Louch" Jacobs – vocals (track 4)
- Vincenzo "Vinnie Paz" Luvineri – vocals (tracks: 7, 14), executive producer
- Ryan "Royce da 5′9″" Montgomery – vocals (track 10)
- Daniel "King Syze" Albaladejo – vocals (track 12)
- Steve "DJ Cru Cut" Miller – scratches (tracks: 1, 3, 12)
- Dave "DJ Kwestion" Klein – scratches (tracks: 6, 8, 10), producer (track 8)
- Jay "J-Zone" Mumford – scratches & producer (track 9)
- Scott "Supe" Stallone – guitar & producer (track 14), engineering & mixing (tracks: 1, 2, 4, 5, 7–14), recording (tracks: 3, 6)
- Shawn Peck – drums (track 14)
- Jim "DJ Sat-One" Thorpe – scratches (track 14)
- R. "Sake" Joyce – producer (tracks: 1, 7, 10)
- A. "DJ Soundtrax" Decenzo – producer (track 2)
- B. Coles – producer (tracks: 3, 6)
- Olivier Blanger – producer (tracks: 3, 6)
- Stéphane Gourdais – producer (tracks: 3, 6)
- Ray "Clockwork" Kline – producer (tracks: 4, 11)
- A. "Low Key" Grabowski – producer (track 5)
- George "7L" Andrinopoulos – producer (track 12)
- Eric Vanderslice – producer (track 13)
- Jons – mixing & mastering (track 6)
- Michael Sarsfield – mastering, lacquer cut
- Nubian Image – art direction, design
- Jesse Stone – marketing
