= Moment of Rarities =

Compilation album by 7L & Esoteric
- Released: July 26, 2005
- Genre: Hip-hop
- Length: 44:55
- Label: Babygrande
- Producer: 7L, Beyonder, D-Son, Panik, Papa D!, Prowla

7L & Esoteric chronology
| DC2: Bars of Death (2004) | Moment of Rarities (2005) | A New Dope (2006) |

Professional ratings
Review scores
| Source | Rating |
|---|---|
| AllMusic | 3/5 stars |
| RapReviews | 8/10 stars |

Moment of Rarities is the first compilation album released from Boston underground hip-hop duo 7L & Esoteric. Released on July 26, 2005 under Babygrande Records, the album contains songs that were unreleased up to 2005.

== Track listing ==
| No. | Title | Producer(s) | Length |
|---|---|---|---|
| 1. | "Knockout (Victory Lap)" | Beyonder | 2:54 |
| 2. | "Boxcutter Rap" | 7L | 2:33 |
| 3. | "Axe Hurlers" (featuring Beyonder) | Prowla | 2:44 |
| 4. | "Psychohistorians" (featuring Karma) | Beyonder | 2:49 |
| 5. | "Culture of Death" (featuring Jus Allah) | Beyonder | 3:20 |
| 6. | "Lurkers at the Threshold" (featuring Truth Elemental) | Beyonder | 2:10 |
| 7. | "Face Defeat" | 7L | 3:35 |
| 8. | "God's Angry Men" (featuring Karma and The Perceptionists) | Papa D! | 3:35 |
| 9. | "Boston to Chi-Town" | Panik | 2:52 |
| 10. | "Cobra" | 7L | 2:50 |
| 11. | "Word Association (Remix)" | D-Son | 3:28 |
| 12. | "Throw 'Em Up" (featuring Beyonder) | 7L | 4:00 |
| 13. | "Olde English" (featuring Slaine) | 7L | 3:05 |
| 14. | "Rucker Promo" | 7L | 1:10 |
| 15. | "This Way" | D-Son | 3:50 |
| Total length: | | | 44:55 |
