= Money Rules tha World =

Studio album by Fred Money
- Released: June 5, 2009
- Genre: Hip-hop
- Length: 38:49
- Labels: Writer's Block; Babygrande
- Producers: GoodWill & MGI; Matter Productions; Millz; Phillip Belizaire; Scott Varner; Shawneci; Spectacular; Trakdealaz

Money Rules tha World is the debut album by the American rapper Fred Money. It was released on June 5, 2009, through Writer's Block Records and Babygrande Records. Production was handled by Phillip Belizaire, Scott Varner, Millz, Matter Productions, GoodWill & MGI, Shawneci, Trakdealaz, and his brother Spectacular. It features guest appearances from O. Cooks, P. Dub, LD Capone, and his other brother J.R. Writer.

== Track listing ==
No.	Title	Producers	Length
1.	"Intro"	Phillip Belizaire; Scott Varner	2:57
2.	"Killa Beat Pt. 2"	Millz	2:56
3.	"Thunderbird (Freestyle)"	Trakdealaz	2:09
4.	"Dollar Bill" (featuring J.R. Writer)	Spectacular	3:02
5.	"Over Here" (featuring O. Cooks)	Trakdealaz	3:24
6.	"Freekey Zekey Speaks"		00:36
7.	"Stunt Hard" (featuring J.R. Writer)	Trakdealaz	4:00
8.	"Talk It Over"	Matter Productions	3:00
9.	"Them Days"	GoodWill & MGI	3:26
10.	"Work"	Trakdealaz	3:00
11.	"Paper Chaser" (featuring P. Dub)	Trakdealaz	2:59
12.	"Soulja"	Trakdealaz	2:04
13.	"40 Cal Speaks"		0:28
14.	"Money On My Mind" (featuring LD Capone)	Shawneci	3:17
15.	"Fresh Money"	Trakdealaz	1:31
