= Crypt the Warchild =

American rapper (born 1980)

Crypt
- Crypt (right) pictured with Vinnie Paz (left), 2014.

Background information
- Also known as: Cryptnotik
- Born: Marcus Albaladejo; August 18, 1980 (age 45)
- Origin: Philadelphia, Pennsylvania, United States
- Genres: Hip Hop
- Occupations: MC, rapper
- Years active: 1997–present
- Label: Babygrande
- Member of: OuterSpace; Army of the Pharaohs

Marcus Albaladejo (born August 18, 1980), better known by his stage name Crypt the Warchild, is an underground rapper from Philadelphia, Pennsylvania. Albaladejo is one half of the rap duo OuterSpace and is a member of Army of the Pharaohs. Crypt the Warchild is the older brother of rapper King Syze, who is also a member of Army of the Pharaohs.

== Biography ==
=== 1995-1999: Early Career ===
Crypt the Warchild started rapping with high school friends Mario Collazo and Richard Cruz. The trio later went on to form the group OuterSpace. The group originally started to form in the early 1990s and eventually lead to an alliance with fellow Philadelphians Jedi Mind Tricks and their label Superegular Recordings. In 1998, Superegular released their debut single "We Lyve" which was met with critical praise for its complex, scientific rhymes and ethereal, seemingly other-worldly beats.

Outerspace appeared on several JMT tracks and in 1999 the Illegaliens EP was released in on the Wordsound label. Soon thereafter, Outerspace hooked up with DJ SAT ONE and began recording with Jazzy Jeff's production company A Touch of Jazz. This collaboration proved fruitful with the release of the SAT ONE produced Danger Zone 12" on Soulspazm Records.

=== 2000-2004: Blood and Ashes ===
Crypt continued to work alongside as a rap duo with OuterSpace and appeared on Jedi Mind Tricks' albums through the early 2000s and became a part of Paz's supergroup Army of the Pharaohs. Crypt the Warchild appeared on the track The Rage of Angels on the album Visions of Gandhi in 2003. He was also featured on Army of the Pharaohs compilation album; Rare Shit, Collabos and Freestyles. In May 2004, Outerspace released Jedi Mind Tricks Presents OuterSpace A collection of Outerspace's 12" and previously unreleased tracks from the Superegular label era, loyalists were treated to unreleased music, while new fans were given the chance to experience the tracks that established Outerspace's underground presence. After OuterSpace moved with Jedi Mind Tricks over to Babygrande Records, they went on to release their debut studio album Blood and Ashes, in July 2004. The Album features collaborations by Jedi Mind Tricks member Vinnie Paz, Immortal Technique, Sadat X from Brand Nubian and fellow A.O.T.P. members 7L & Esoteric, Celph Titled, Des Devious & King Syze.

=== 2005-2007: Blood Brothers and work with Army of the Pharaohs ===
In 2005, it was announced that Army of the Pharaohs were working on their debut studio album. OuterSpace members were due to be on te album. On March 21, 2006 The Torture Papers was released on Babygrande Records. Artists including Crypt the Warchilds brother; King Syze, Jedi Mind Tricks frontman; Vinnie Paz, JuJu Mob members; Chief Kamachi & Reef the Lost Cauze, The Demigodz members; Apathy and Celph Titled and other artists including 7L & Esoteric, Des Devious & Faez One were also on the album. An Army of the Pharaohs collaboration album was rumoured to be in the works for years, but was often delayed due to separate projects and internal problems, however a mixtape titled The Bonus Papers was released shortly after the release of the album because it was thought some songs didn't fit the artistic design of the album while others were known to have been extremely political and were possibly held back to reduce controversy. Another mixtape titled After Torture There's Pain was released early in 2007.

In 2006, OuterSpace released their second studio album Blood Brothers, it was released on September 5, 2006, by Babygrande Records. The album features guest appearances from Vinnie Paz of Jedi Mind Tricks, Sheek Louch and Royce da 5'9". The album's lead single is "Street Massacre" b/w "U Don't Like Me". OuterSpace were seen on Army of the Pharaohs second studio album Ritual of Battle, it was officially released on September 21, 2007, . The album also features group members Vinnie Paz, Jus Allah, Chief Kamachi, Reef the Lost Cauze, Esoteric, Celph Titled, King Syze, Des Devious, Doap Nixon, Demoz, and King Magnetic. Although he was prominently featured on the group's debut album The Torture Papers, Apathy does not appear on Ritual of Battle. Crypt was featured on his younger brother and Army of the Pharaohs affiliate, King Syze' debut solo album Syzemology on the song Band of Brothers.

=== 2008-2010: God's Fury and The Torture Papers ===
On September 30, 2008 OuterSpace released their third studio album titled; God's Fury. It was released via Babygrande Records. The album features collaborations by Jedi Mind Tricks member Vinnie Paz, Sick Jacken & Cynic of Psycho Realm, and fellow A.O.T.P. members Doap Nixon, Reef The Lost Cauze, Des Devious, King Syze, Celph Titled, and Chief Kamachi. OuterSpace were also seen collaborating with Doap Nixon on his debut LP Sour Diesel on the song Warning Shot alongside brother King Syze.

OuterSpace returned to work on the third studio album with Army of the Pharaohs titled The Unholy Terror. The official street release date was March 30, 2010, but the album was released early on March 19, 2010 on UGHH.com. In 2011, Crypt the Warchild was featured on Apathys album Honkey Kong on the track Army of the Gods which featured both Demigodz and Army of the Pharaohs members; Blacastan, Celph Titled, Esoteric, Motive, Reef the Lost Cauze, Planetary and Vinnie Paz. Crypt was also featured on Heavy Metal Kings song Devils Rebels.

=== 2011-2014: My Brothers Keeper, In Death Reborn and Lost in Space ===
On August 23, 2011, OuterSpace released their fourth studio album titled My Brother's Keeper. It was released by Enemy Soil. The Album features collaborations by Jedi Mind Tricks member Vinnie Paz, Ill Bill, Doap Nixon, Apathy, Blacastan, Esoteric, Sick Jacken, King Syze and V-Zilla. On November 30, 2013, Vinnie Paz revealed that two new Army Of The Pharaohs albums would be released in 2014. In Death Reborn is slated for a release on 22 April and the second LP is expected to drop in November. OuterSpace duo Crypt the Warchild and Planetary are both confirmed to be on the upcoming albums. New members including Blacastan of The Demigodz and Zilla from Houston, Texas are said to be joining the group. In 2012, they announced they were working on their fifth studio album titled Lost in Space. The album was originally set to be released in August, 2012 but has been pushed back and it is said to be released somewhere in 2014. They released two singles of the album, one called Manolo produced by Stu Bangas and one called Never Enough produced by Snowgoons.

Crypt the Warchild was featured alongside A.O.T.P. members King Magnetic Planetary and Reef The Lost Cauze for the single Ready for War by The Returners. In 2014, he collaborated with rapper Manage on the song War Cry, this song was later featured on his album The Memory hole.

== Cancer ==
On January 27, 2013 Crypt the Warchild was diagnosed with Hodgkin's Lymphoma. He shared the news in a post on Facebook; "To all my family, friends and fans. I'd like to give everyone a heads up on what exactly it is that I am going through. January 27th I was diagnosed with Stage 3b Hodgkins Lymphoma (sic). I have been sick for a long time and really had no idea. I base my life on hard work and dedication to my family and friends. I would like to thank everyone for the support and genuine concern for my well being. F**k cancer, I will get through this. Thank you for everything."

In July, 2013 he posted an update on jedimindtricks.com on how he was getting along with his cancer, stating that ” It's been awhile since I gave an update on me and the situation I'm going thru. It has been a crazy journey both physically and mentally but it looks like my darkest days are almost behind me. I still have ways to go but I am getting better. Once again thank you to all who stayed in my corner during this battle, true colors show when you are at your worst. I'm still amazed from all the love and support I’ve received from everyone. This is my 7th inning stretch, I’ma shut this bitch down. Peace to all. Warchild..”

== Discography ==
Collaborative albums

- Blood and Ashes (2004) (with OuterSpace)
- The Torture Papers (2006) (with Army of the Pharaohs)
- Blood Brothers (2006) (with OuterSpace)
- Ritual of Battle (2007) (with Army of the Pharaohs)
- God's Fury (2008) (with OuterSpace)
- The Unholy Terror (2010) (with Army of the Pharaohs)
- My Brother's Keeper (2011) (with OuterSpace)
- In Death Reborn (2014) (with Army of the Pharaohs)
- Heavy Lies the Crown (2014) (with Army of the Pharaohs)
