= King Syze =

American rapper

- King Syze (left), with Planetary, Zilla and Vinnie Paz.

Background information
- Also known as: Syze
- Born: David Albaladejo
- Origin: Philadelphia, Pennsylvania, United States
- Genres: Hip Hop
- Occupations: MC, rapper
- Years active: 2001-present
- Label: Babygrande

David Albaladejo (better known by his stage name King Syze) is an underground rapper from Philadelphia, Pennsylvania, of Puerto Rican descent. He is a member of the underground hip hop supergroup Army of the Pharaohs (AOTP), having featured on all their studio albums. He is known for his frequent collaboration with AOTP members; OuterSpace. Outside of rap, Albaladejo works as a member of a trade union which has inspired the names of many of his studio albums.

Many have likened the witty aggressive flow and opposing mic presence of King Syze to that of Big Pun. King Syze has been featured on notable albums by Jedi Mind Tricks' Visions of Gandhi, Vinnie Paz's God of the Serengeti, 7L & Esoterics DC2: Bars of Death and OuterSpace's Blood and Ashes, Blood Brothers, God's Fury, and My Brother's Keeper as well as prominent features on the current smash full-length Army Of The Pharaohs' The Torture Papers. He released his first full-length album Syzemology in 2006 and features appearances from fellow Pharaohs Vinnie Paz, 7L & Esoteric, OuterSpace, Reef The Lost Cauze, Des Devious as well as verses from Sabac Red (of Non Phixion), Pumpkinhead and Block McCloud, as well as production from DJ 7L, Jon Doe, Block McCloud, Louis Logic, Crisis Center and Archrival.

In 2008, King Syze released his second studio album The Labor Union. The album was known for "Syze lacing his relentless, rapid-fire flow over a slew of spine-tingling gutter tracks" It contained production from Team 707, DJ Waxwork, Skammadix, and MTK. The album was considered an underground cult classic. On October 4, 2011, King Syze released his third studio album Collective Bargaining. It was entirely produced by Skammadix and featured Vinnie Paz, Ill Bill, Celph Titled, Esoteric, Planetary and Crypt the Warchild of OuterSpace, Baby Blak, Burke The Jurke, Doap Nixon, Kev Turner, Side Effect, Blacastan, V-Zilla, OuterSpace, Diabolic, Jus Allah, King Magnetic, Reef the Lost Cauze, Apathy, Chris Webby, Lawrence Arnell, Rockie Reyes, Poynt Blanc, M-Dot, and featured cuts by DJ Kwestion.

== Biography ==
=== Career beginnings (2001–2004) ===
King Syze grew up in Philadelphia, Pennsylvania, where he found his hip hop influences in his family, friends and school environment, all of which were ripe with young talent. Syze started rapping at 12 years old, heavily inspired by his older brother, Marcus Albaladejo (Crypt the Warchild) and now brother-in-law Mario Collazo (Planetary), who together make up the Philadelphia hip hop group OuterSpace.

His first 12" Single was released in 2002 containing: "Street Poetry" featuring Doap Nixon and OuterSpace, "Philly's Finest" featuring Doap Nixon, and "Last Standin'" featuring rap duo OuterSpace. It was produced by Tim the Toolman, executive produced by Vinnie Paz and put out by Superegular Recordings.

On 23 September 2003, King Syze released another 12" Vinyl with the tracks; Machine Gun Rap, Blitz Inc. which featured fellow rappers Esoteric and Vinnie Paz and Sibling Rivalry which featured OuterSpace. His Track Machine Gun Rap was featured on 7L And Beyonders compilation album; Vinyl Thug Music. It was in 2003 that Vinnie Paz gave Syze the proposition to join hip hop supergroup; Army of the Pharaohs. Syze agreed and saw his first feature with them on their compilation album Rare Shit, Collabos And Freestyles on a freestyle track and the track Syzemology. He then went on to feature with Planetary and Crypt the Warchilds rap duo; OuterSpace where he was seen on the track Gods And General alongside Des Devious and on their self-titled compilation album Outerspace on the tracks Qrown Royal and Front To Back Syze also collaborated with 7L & Esoteric on the trackThis Is War on the album DC2: Bars of Death.

=== The Torture Papers, Syzemology & Ritual of Battle (2005–2007) ===
In 2005, Syze recorded the tracks Spittin' Heavy and Band of Brothers which featured Crypt the Warchild, it was released as a 12" vinyl in early 2006. He was then featured on Jedi Mind Tricks fifth studio album Servants in Heaven, Kings in Hell on the track Blitz, inc.' alongside 7L & Esoteric. OuterSpace hollered Syze again for another feature on their third studio album Blood Brothers on the track "Hustle and Flow".

Army of the Pharaohs released their debut studio album The Torture Papers the roster at this point contained Apathy, King Syze, Crypt the Warchild, Des Devious, Esoteric, Celph Titled, Chief Kamachi, Planetary, Vinnie Paz, Reef the Lost Cauze and Faez One. The album peaked at number 48 on the Billboard Top Independent Albums.

In 2005, King Syze announced that he was working on his debut album titled Syzemology. It was officially released 13 June 2006 and contained guest appearances from Block McCloud, Pumpkinhead, Des Devious, OuterSpace, Reef the Lost Cauze, Vinnie Paz and more.

In 2007, the second album by hip hop supergroup Army of the Pharaohs was released titled Ritual of Battle on September 21, 2007. The album features group members Vinnie Paz, Jus Allah, OuterSpace, Chief Kamachi, Reef the Lost Cauze, Esoteric, Celph Titled, King Syze, Des Devious, Doap Nixon, Demoz, and King Magnetic. Although he was prominently featured on the group's debut album The Torture Papers, Apathy does not appear on Ritual of Battle. Later in 2007, German production group Snowgoons enlisted King Syzes track Blitz Inc. on their mixtape The Joining Forces.

=== The Labor Union, The Unholy Terror (2008–2010) ===
In 2008, King Syze released his second studio album The Labor Union. The album was known for "Syze lacing his relentless, rapid-fire flow over a slew of spine-tingling gutter tracks" It contained production from Team 707, DJ Waxwork, Skammadix, and DJ Cru Cut and more. The album was considered an underground cult classic. The album saw appearances from fellow Pharaoh soldiers Vinnie Paz, Reef the Lost Cauze, Apathy, Des Devious, and Doap Nixon as well as OuterSpace and Ill Bill of Non Phixion.

OuterSpace released the track Gods and Generals 2 which saw appearances from King Syze and Des Devious again just like the original Gods and Generals song and was released on the album God's Fury. In 2009, Jedi Mind Tricks put King Syzes track Blitz, inc. on their compilation album Greatest Features.

March 19, 2010 marked the release date of Army of the Pharaohs third studio album; The Unholy Terror. Apathy returned to the group and new additions were added to the roster including; Block McCloud and Journalist. Chief Kamachi, however, got into a feud with Vinnie Paz and Apathy and therefore decided to leave AOTP.

=== The Pharaoh Philes & Collective Bargaining (2011–2013) ===
Tracks of OuterSpace featuring Des Devious and King Syze; ‘Gods and Generals’ and ‘Gods and Generals 2’ were listed in the second compilation album by Army of the Pharaohs; The Pharaoh Philes which was presented by Babygrande Records.

On 4 October 2011, King Syze released his third studio album Collective Bargaining. It featured Celph Titled, Esoteric, Planetary, Baby Blak, Burke The Jurke, Doap Nixon, Kev Turner Side Effect, Blacastan, V-Zilla, OuterSpace, Diabolic, M-Dot, Jus Allah, King Magnetic, Reef the Lost Cauze, Apathy, Chris Webby, Lawrence Arnell, Rockie Eyes, Poynt Blanc, Crypt the Warchild, Ill Bill, and Vinnie Paz and is fully produced by Skammadix. An Extended Play version of the album was released on iTunes on 13 August 2013. Collective Bargaining was not released on a label. An Extended Play version was released on to iTunes on 13 August 2013.

In 2012, King Syze was featured on Vinnie Paz' mixtape The Priest of Bloodshed on the track Golden Casket which also featured La Coka Nostra frontman Ill Bill. Syze was also featured on Apathys third compilation album It's The Bootleg, Muthafuckas! Volume 3: Fire Walk With Me on the tracks; And Now alongside Vinnie Paz and Water to Wine alongside Chris Webby. In 2013, King Syze was also featured on Jedi Mind Tricks' 12" Vinyl for the Animal Rap Release Party which took place Live at Silk City (Philadelphia, PA) on 4 March 2003 other guests featuring include Chief Kamachi, King Syze and OuterSpace.

=== Union Terminology, 2 AOTP albums and Vested (2014–2016) ===
On November 30, 2013, Vinnie Paz revealed that two new Army Of The Pharaohs albums would be released in 2014. In Death Reborn is slated for a release on 22 April and the second LP is expected to drop in November. King Syze is confirmed to be on the upcoming albums. New members including Blacastan of The Demigodz and Zilla from Houston, Texas, are said to be joining the group.

On 28 January 2014, Syze announced he was working on his fourth studio album titled Union Terminology. The project is produced entirely by Skammadix (who also produced the whole Collective Bargaining album) and will be of the usual genre of hardcore rap that Syze raps with and will incorporate a diverse array of topics such as daily struggles, and working as a union member. The album is said to be available for free download. On 28 February 2014, Syze released the first single off the album titled; "Due Process". A music video was released the same day. The album is confirmed to be released on 25 March 2014. The album was titled Heavy Lies the Crown. He released his debut EP, Vested in 2015.

=== Addicted to the Rhythm EP (2019) ===
Syze released his second EP titled Addicted to the Rhythm on May 31, 2019.

== Discography ==
Studio albums

- Syzemology (2006)
- The Labor Union (2008)
- Collective Bargaining (2011)
- Union Terminology (2014)

Collaborative albums

- Ritual of Battle (with Army of the Pharaohs) (2007)
- The Unholy Terror (with Army of the Pharaohs) (2010)
- In Death Reborn (with Army of the Pharaohs) (2014)
- Heavy Lies the Crown (with Army of the Pharaohs) (2014)
- Year of the Hyenas (with Reef the Lost Cauze) (2014)
- Murderers Row (with Reef the Lost Cauze, OuterSpace & Snowgoons) (2025)

Extended plays

- Vested (2015)
- Addicted to the Rhythm (2019)
