= After Torture There's Pain =

Mixtape by Army of the Pharaohs
- Released: 2007
- Recorded: 2007
- Genre: Hip hop
- Label: Babygrande

Army of the Pharaohs chronology
| The Bonus Papers (2006) | After Torture There's Pain (2007) |

After Torture There's Pain is the second mixtape by Army of the Pharaohs. It was released after the band's debut album The Torture Papers.

== Track listing ==
1. Intro
2. Blitz
3. Murder Death Kill
4. Prince of Darkness
5. This is War
6. The Pharaohs
7. QD Cut
8. Already Dead
9. Are You Ready
10. Divine Evil
11. Every Second
12. The Army
13. Real Villains
14. Gods and Generals
15. Cult Status
16. You Can Try
17. Chain Reaction (Remix)
18. Speak Now
19. Gangsta, Gangsta
20. Band of Brothers
21. Silence & I
22. Burning Candles
