= Planetary (rapper) =

American rapper

- Planetary performing in 2006

Background information
- Born: Mario Collazo; August 8, 1978 (age 48); Philadelphia, Pennsylvania, U.S.
- Genres: Hip hop
- Occupation: Rapper
- Years active: 1997–present
- Label: Babygrande

Mario Collazo (born August 8, 1978), better known by his stage name Planetary, is an American underground rapper from Philadelphia, Pennsylvania. He is one half of the rap duo OuterSpace and a member of Army of the Pharaohs.

== Biography ==
=== Early career (1995-1999) ===
Planetary started rapping with high school friends Marcus Albaladejo and Richard Cruz. The trio later went on to form the group OuterSpace. The group originally started to form in the early 90s and eventually lead to an alliance with fellow Philadelphians Jedi Mind Tricks and their label Superegular Recordings. In 1998, Superegular released their debut single "We Lyve" which was met with critical praise for its complex, scientific rhymes and ethereal, seemingly other-worldly beats.

Outerspace appeared on several JMT tracks and on the Illegaliens EP released in 1999 on the Wordsound label. Soon thereafter, Outerspace hooked up with DJ SAT ONE and began recording with Jazzy Jeff's production company A Touch of Jazz. This collaboration proved fruitful with the release of the SAT ONE produced Danger Zone 12" on Soulspazm Records.

=== Blood and Ashes (2000-2004) ===
Crypt continued to work alongside as a rap duo with OuterSpace and appeared on Jedi Mind Tricks' albums through the early 2000s and became a part of Paz's supergroup Army of the Pharaohs. He was also featured on Army of the Pharaohs compilation album; Rare Shit, Collabos and Freestyles. In May 2004, Outerspace released Jedi Mind Tricks Presents Outerspace A collection of Outerspace's 12" and previously unreleased tracks from the Superegular label era, loyalists were treated to unreleased music, while new fans were given the chance to experience the tracks that established Outerspace's underground presence. After OuterSpace moved with Jedi Mind Tricks over to Babygrande Records, they went on to release their debut studio album Blood and Ashes, in July 2004. The Album features collaborations by Jedi Mind Tricks member Vinnie Paz, Immortal Technique, Sadat X from Brand Nubian and fellow A.O.T.P. members 7L & Esoteric, Celph Titled, Des Devious & King Syze.

=== Blood Brothers, God's Fury and AOTP (2005-2010) ===
Planetary along with Crypt released Blood Brothers. Their third album which was released on September 5, 2006, by Babygrande Records. The album features guest appearances from Vinnie Paz of Jedi Mind Tricks, Sheek Louch and Royce da 5'9". The album's lead single is "Street Massacre" b/w "U Don't Like Me".

During this time Vinnie Paz added Planetary to the Army of the Pharaohs roster. A start of numerous releases for Planetary for the hip hop supergroup.The Torture Papers is the debut album by Army of the Pharaohs, released March 21, 2006, on Babygrande Records. The album also features Vinnie Paz, Chief Kamachi, 7L & Esoteric, Virtuoso and Bahamadia. Virtuoso and Bahamadia later split from the group, which now consists of Paz, Kamachi, 7L & Esoteric, Apathy, Crypt the Warchild, King Syze, Reef the Lost Cauze, Des Devious, Celph Titled and Faez One. An Army of the Pharaohs collaboration album was rumored to be in the works for years, but was often delayed due to separate projects and internal problems, however a mixtape titled After Torture There's Pain was released in 2007. Ritual of Battle the second studio album by AOTP was released on September 25, 2007.

OuterSpaces' fourth release God's Fury, was released on September 30, 2008, by Babygrande Records. The album features collaborations by Jedi Mind Tricks member Vinnie Paz, Sick Jacken & Cynic of Psycho Realm, and fellow A.O.T.P. members Doap Nixon, Reef The Lost Cauze, Des Devious, King Syze, Celph Titled, and Chief Kamachi.

=== My Brothers Keeper and Lost in Space (2011-2015) ===
My Brother's Keeper was the fourth studio album from underground hip hop duo OuterSpace, released on August 23, 2011, by Enemy Soil. The album features collaborations by Vinnie Paz, Ill Bill, Doap Nixon, Apathy, Blacastan, Esoteric, Sick Jacken, King Syze and Zilla.

== Discography ==
Collaborative albums

- Blood and Ashes (2004) (with OuterSpace)
- The Torture Papers (2006) (with Army of the Pharaohs)
- Blood Brothers (2006) (with OuterSpace)
- Ritual of Battle (2007) (with Army of the Pharaohs)
- God's Fury (2008) (with OuterSpace)
- The Unholy Terror (2010) (with Army of the Pharaohs)
- My Brother's Keeper (2011) (with OuterSpace)
- In Death Reborn (2014) (with Army of the Pharaohs)
- Heavy Lies the Crown (2014) (with Army of the Pharaohs)
