= OuterSpace =

American underground hip hop duo

- OuterSpace member Planetary

Background information
- Origin: Philadelphia, Pennsylvania
- Genres: Hip hop
- Years active: 1997–present
- Labels: Babygrande Records, Enemy Soil
- Members: Planetary; Crypt the Warchild
- Past members: Jedeye

OuterSpace is an underground hip hop duo from North Philadelphia. Originally a trio consisting of three Puerto Rican friends that then took the artist names Planetary, Jedeye and Crypt the Warchild. The founding member Mario Collazo (Planetary) was then attending 10th grade, while the other two, Richard Cruz (Jedeye) and Marcus Albaladejo (Crypt the Warchild), were in 8th grade.

Today the group consists only of Planetary and Crypt The Warchild, who are also part of the hip hop collective Army of the Pharaohs.

== Recording history ==
=== Early career (1995–1999) ===
The group originally started with three high school friends; Marcus Albaladejo, Mario Collazo and Richard Cruz. The trio later went on to form the group OuterSpace. The group originally started to form in the early 1990s and eventually led to an alliance with fellow Philadelphians Jedi Mind Tricks and their label Superegular Recordings. In 1998, Superegular released their debut single "We Lyve". OuterSpace appeared on several Jedi Mind Trick tracks and in 1999 the Illegaliens EP was released in on the Wordsound label. Soon thereafter, OuterSpace hooked up with DJ Sat-One and began recording with Jazzy Jeff's production company A Touch of Jazz. This collaboration proved useful with the release of the SAT ONE produced Danger Zone 12" on Soulspazm Records.

=== OuterSpace and Blood and Ashes (2000–2004) ===
OuterSpace appeared on Jedi Mind Tricks' albums through the early 2000s and became a part of Paz's supergroup Army of the Pharaohs. In May 2004, OuterSpace released Jedi Mind Tricks Presents OuterSpace A collection of OuterSpace's 12" and previously unreleased tracks from the Superegular label era, loyalists were treated to unreleased music, while new fans were given the chance to experience the tracks that established OuterSpace's underground presence. After OuterSpace moved with Jedi Mind Tricks over to Babygrande Records, they went on to release their debut studio album Blood and Ashes, in July 2004. The Album features collaborations by Jedi Mind Tricks member Vinnie Paz, Immortal Technique, Sadat X from Brand Nubian and fellow A.O.T.P. members 7L & Esoteric, Celph Titled, Des Devious & King Syze.

=== Blood Brothers and work with Army of the Pharaohs (2005–2007) ===
In 2005, it was announced that Army of the Pharaohs were working on their debut studio album. OuterSpace members were due to be on the album. On March 21, 2006 The Torture Papers was released on Babygrande Records. Artists including Crypt the Warchilds brother; King Syze, Jedi Mind Tricks frontman; Vinnie Paz, JuJu Mob members; Chief Kamachi & Reef the Lost Cauze, The Demigodz members; Apathy and Celph Titled and other artists including 7L & Esoteric, Des Devious & Faez One were also on the album. An Army of the Pharaohs collaboration album was rumoured to be in the works for years, but was often delayed due to separate projects and internal problems, however a mixtape titled The Bonus Papers was released shortly after the release of the album because it was thought some songs didn't fit the artistic design of the album while others were known to have been extremely political and were possibly held back to reduce controversy. Another mixtape titled After Torture There's Pain was released early in 2007.

In 2006, OuterSpace released their second studio album Blood Brothers, it was released on September 5, 2006, by Babygrande Records. The album features guest appearances from Vinnie Paz of Jedi Mind Tricks, Sheek Louch and Royce da 5'9". The album's lead single is "Street Massacre" b/w "U Don't Like Me". OuterSpace were seen on Army of the Pharaohs second studio album Ritual of Battle, it was officially released on September 21, 2007, . The album also features group members Vinnie Paz, Jus Allah, Chief Kamachi, Reef the Lost Cauze, Esoteric, Celph Titled, King Syze, Des Devious, Doap Nixon, Demoz, and King Magnetic. Although he was prominently featured on the group's debut album The Torture Papers, Apathy does not appear on Ritual of Battle.

=== God's Fury and The Unholy Terror (2008–2010) ===
On September 30, 2008, OuterSpace released their third studio album titled; God's Fury. It was released via Babygrande Records. The album features collaborations by Jedi Mind Tricks member Vinnie Paz, Sick Jacken & Cynic of Psycho Realm, and fellow A.O.T.P. members Doap Nixon, Reef The Lost Cauze, Des Devious, King Syze, Celph Titled, and Chief Kamachi. OuterSpace were also seen collaborating with Doap Nixon on his debut LP Sour Diesel on the song Warning Shot alongside brother King Syze.

OuterSpace returned to work on the third studio album with Army of the Pharaohs titled The Unholy Terror. The official street release date was March 30, 2010, but the album was released early on March 19, 2010, on UGHH.com.

=== My Brothers Keeper, In Death Reborn and Lost in Space (2011–2015) ===
On August 23, 2011, OuterSpace released their fourth studio album titled My Brother's Keeper. It was released by Enemy Soil. The Album features collaborations by Jedi Mind Tricks member Vinnie Paz, Ill Bill, Doap Nixon, Apathy, Blacastan, Esoteric, Sick Jacken, King Syze and V-Zilla.

On November 30, 2013, Vinnie Paz revealed that two new Army Of The Pharaohs albums would be released in 2014. In Death Reborn is slated for a release on 22 April and the second LP is expected to drop in November. OuterSpace duo Crypt the Warchild and Planetary are both confirmed to be on the upcoming albums. New members including Blacastan of The Demigodz and Zilla from Houston, Texas are said to be joining the group.

In 2012, they announced they were working on their fifth studio album titled Lost in Space. The album was originally set to be released in August, 2012 but has been pushed back and it is said to be released somewhere in 2016. They released two promo singles of the album, one called Manolo produced by Stu Bangas and one called Never Enough produced by Snowgoons. A new single called Murder Makes Art (MMA) produced by Scott Stallone, came out in 2015.

=== Lost Angels (2016–present) ===
On February 4, 2023, Outerspace released their first project in almost 10 years: An EP entitled Lost Angels featuring 4 new tracks.

== Discography ==
Studio albums

- Blood and Ashes (2004)
- Blood Brothers (2006)
- God's Fury (2008)
- My Brother's Keeper (2011)

Collaborative albums

- The Torture Papers (with Army of the Pharaohs) (2006)
- Ritual of Battle (with Army of the Pharaohs) (2007)
- The Unholy Terror (with Army of the Pharaohs) (2010)
- In Death Reborn (with Army of the Pharaohs) (2014)
- Heavy Lies The Crown (with Army of the Pharaohs) (2014)
- Murderers Row (with Reef the Lost Cauze, King Syze & Snowgoons) (2025)

Compilation albums

- Outerspace (2004)

Extended plays

- Lost Angels (2023)
- The Gods Themselves (2025)

Mixtapes

- A Tribute To Gang Starr (2009)
