= Army of the Pharaohs =

American hip-hop group

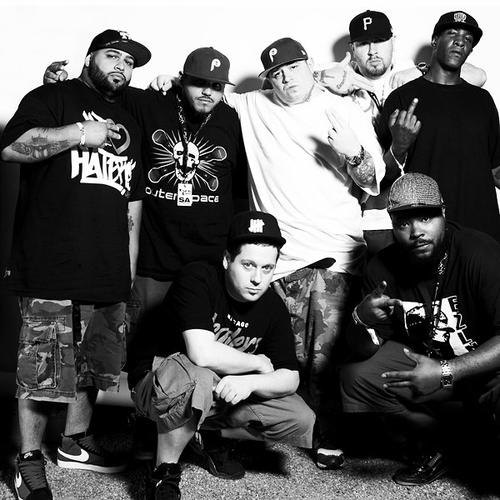
- The group in 2014

Background information
- Origin: Philadelphia, Pennsylvania, United States
- Genres: Hip-hop; hardcore hip-hop; underground hip-hop; conscious hip-hop
- Years active: 1998–present (hiatus 2015–2021)
- Labels: Babygrande; Enemy Soil
- Members: Apathy (DGZ); Block McCloud; Celph Titled (DGZ); Crypt the Warchild (OS); Demoz (OPG); Des Devious (QD); Esoteric (DGZ); King Syze; Planetary (OS); Reef the Lost Cauze (JM); Vinnie Paz (JMT); Zilla
- Past members: 7L; Bahamadia; Blacastan (DGZ) (deceased); Chief Kamachi (JM); Faez One; Journalist; Jus Allah (JMT); Stoupe (JMT); Virtuoso; King Magnetic; Doap Nixon (OPG); DJ Kwestion

AOTP logo (as seen on In Death Reborn)

Army of the Pharaohs (most commonly abbreviated as A.O.T.P.) is an American underground hip-hop collective originating from Philadelphia, Pennsylvania, formed by Jedi Mind Tricks founder Vinnie Paz in 1998. The collective has strong links to other underground east coast groups such as OuterSpace, La Coka Nostra, Demigodz, 7L & Esoteric, JuJu Mob, and Snowgoons. AOTP's affiliations and member roster has changed several times since its formation.

Paz formed the outfit in the late 1990s with the original roster of Bahamadia, Chief Kamachi, Virtuoso, 7L & Esoteric, plus Jedi Mind Tricks' other member Stoupe the Enemy of Mankind. The group first released the "Five Perfect Exertions" and "War Ensemble" 12" on Paz's short-lived Superegular Recordings in 1998, but then the underground supergroup remained silent for several years. After a couple of successful Jedi Mind Tricks albums and a new deal with Babygrande by 2003, Paz resurrected the crew, adding OuterSpace, Celph Titled, Reef the Lost Cauze, King Syze, Des Devious, and Apathy; however, Stoupe, Bahamadia, and Virtuoso had defected from the group. Babygrande issued their "Tear It Down" 12" and first album, The Torture Papers, in 2006. The 2007 follow-up album, Ritual of Battle, saw Jus Allah and JMT protégés Doap Nixon and Demoz joining the Pharaohs.

The Unholy Terror was released in March 2010. This album marked the return of Apathy and the addition of two new AOTP members, Block McCloud and Journalist. Two songs, "Godzilla" and "Contra Mantra", were released before the album. This album also marked the departure of Chief Kamachi who left the group because of business issues and an apparent feud with Vinnie Paz and Apathy.

In early 2011, Paz announced on his Facebook page that In Death Reborn is due to be released in 2012, however the date was pushed back and almost seemed like it was never going to be released. Early in 2012, Houston underground MC VZilla and Connecticut's Blacastan were added to the group. Both artists have made names for themselves with their features and album releases in 2012. In Death Reborn was eventually released in April 2014. The album featured members Vinnie Paz, Apathy, Blacastan, Block McCloud, Celph Titled, Demoz, Des Devious, Doap Nixon, Esoteric, Lawrence Arnell, King Magnetic, King Syze, OuterSpace, Reef the Lost Cauze and VZilla. Their fifth studio album, Heavy Lies the Crown was released in October 2014.

== Recording history ==
=== 1998–2003: The original incarnation of the group ===
The original incarnation of the group included five MCs: Vinnie Paz, Chief Kamachi, Esoteric, Virtuoso, and Bahamadia, along with Jedi Mind Tricks producer Stoupe the Enemy of Mankind. The group released their debut EP/single "The Five Perfect Exertions b/w War Ensemble" in 1998. Both tracks were later included on Jedi Minds Tricks' 2000 album Violent by Design; with "The Five Perfect Exertions" being remixed into "Exertions Remix", and both "Exertions" and "War Ensemble" shedding Chief Kamachi's appearance. The Army of the Pharaohs project was put on the back-burner while JMT's career took off. In 2003, AOTP released their debut compilation album Rare Shit, Collabos and Freestyles. It contained various tracks from members of the group.

=== 2004–2007: Torture Papers and Ritual of Battle ===
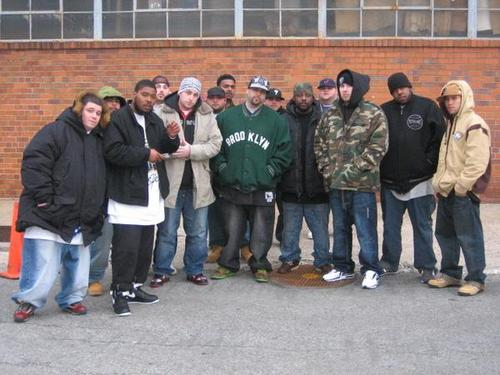
Prominent members of the group, 2006

The group did not return until 2005, without Virtuoso and Bahamadia. The group was now composed of Paz, Kamachi, 7L & Esoteric, OuterSpace, Apathy, Celph Titled, Reef the Lost Cauze, Des Devious, King Syze and Faez One. After years of anticipation, the group recorded its first album, The Torture Papers. It was released in March 2006 on Babygrande Records. The album was produced by AOTP affiliates such as DC the MIDI Alien, Undefined, Beyonder, Loptimist, and German producer Shuko. The album includes the singles "Tear It Down" and "Battle Cry", the former having a music video. The latter was a posse cut with nine of the group's then ten members. The album entered the top 50 on Billboard's Top Independent Album Chart, and reached #42 on the magazine's Heatseekers chart. An unofficial continuation of The Torture Papers soon began circulating around the Internet called The Bonus Papers. It was composed of tracks not released on the album as it was thought that the songs didn't fit the artistic design of the album while others were known to have been extremely political and were possibly held back to reduce controversy.

Army of the Pharaohs released another mixtape in 2007 titled After Torture There's Pain. As the name suggests, it was released as an addition to their debut album; The Torture Papers. The group's second album, Ritual of Battle, was released on September 25, 2007. Ritual of Battle's single, "Bloody Tears", used a sample taken from the soundtrack of the video game series Castlevania. The group added four new members for the album: Jedi Mind Tricks member Jus Allah, Doap Nixon, Demoz and King Magnetic. Apathy was not on Ritual of Battle as he was working on another project with Styles of Beyond.

=== 2008–2010: Chief Kamachi feud and The Unholy Terror ===
In 2008, Chief Kamachi of JuJu Mob left Army of the Pharaohs due to an apparent feud with Vinnie Paz and Apathy. He released a diss track titled First Warning taking aim at Paz and Apathy. Apparently, it started over an e-mail Apathy didn't respond to from Kamachi, what was written in the e-mail hasn't been disclosed. Chief Kamachi later went on to saying It wasn't nothing personal, it was more or less a business decision. On May 17, 2009, Apathy mentioned on his Myspace blog that a new AOTP album was completely finished. The Unholy Terror was released on March 30, 2010. This album marked the return of Apathy and the addition of two new AOTP members, Block McCloud and Journalist. Two songs, "Godzilla" and "Contra Mantra", were released before the album. This album also marked the departure of Chief Kamachi who left the group because of business issues.

=== 2011–2014: In Death Reborn and Heavy Lies the Crown ===
On December 27, 2011, Paz announced on his Facebook page "Army of the Pharaohs – In Death Reborn – 2012". Early in 2012, Houston underground MC V-Zilla and Connecticut's Blacastan (Demigodz) were added to the group. Both artists have made names for themselves with their features and album releases in 2012. It has been said that the album will now be released in 2013 or later. Rumours speculated on Facebook saying that Reef the Lost Cauze would not appear on the album. However, on November 27, 2013 he tweeted how it's "bullshit" and he is going to be on the album. The Army of the Pharaohs will reunite for their fourth LP, In Death Reborn. In April 2013, the official Facebook page of Army of the Pharaohs posted "New album is not finished. Don't know when it will be finished. Will let you know when there's a release date. No need for further questions." On June 27, 2013, AOTP frontman Vinnie Paz tweeted "New solo EP. New Heavy Metal Kings. New Army of the Pharaohs. all coming within the next year."

On 4, October 2013, Apathy shared; "Every AOTP album we've done in the past, we all handed in our verses via email and weren't too hands-on with. This one is different. Every day we've been emailing each other, going over songs... picking beats and showing each other our verses. This might be the best Pharaoh album yet. It definitely is the illest, lyrically. We're all having brotherly competition and trying to murder each other on these songs. It's great. Definite "A" game." On November 30, 2013, Vinnie Paz revealed that two new Army of the Pharaohs albums would be released in 2014. In Death Reborn is slated for an April release, the second LP is expected to drop in November. On February 11, 2014, Celph Titled announced via Facebook that In Death Reborn would be released April 22, 2014.

Many members of the group had released, or were working on, other projects around the time of In Death Reborn. This period was dubbed "The Pharaoh Season". In promotion for In Death Reborn, Vinnie Paz released The Flawless Victory mixtape on March 2, 2014. Reef the Lost Cauze released a collaboration album titled Fast Way alongside producer Emyd on March 9, 2014. Member Doap Nixon only appeared on the song 7th Ghost from the album, however, he went on to say how he was only featured on one song because he had a lot of personal stuff going on and he is currently working on his fourth studio album Sour Diesel 2, he stated that there will be more of him on the LP that is due to drop in November. King Syze released his fourth studio album a month before the album release on March 25 titled Union Terminology, where he speaks out about working as a union trader. Apathy pushed back the release date of his upcoming album Connecticut Casual from April to June in favour of In Death Reborn. Former Pharaoh Jus Allah didn't make an appearance on the album as he is currently working on his second studio album M.M.A. (Meanest Man Alive). A week before the release of In Death Reborn, Zilla announced he was working on his fourth studio album titled Martyr Musick set to be released sometime June 2014.

On August 6, 2014, the content was published on the Jedi Mind Tricks website announcing the second AOTP album of the year Heavy Lies the Crown set for a release on October 21, 2014. Six months after In Death Reborn.

=== 2015–2021: Hiatus and fallout among members ===
As of 2015, the group has been on a hiatus whilst they all focus on their solo careers and other ventures. In a 2018 poll, Jedi Mind Tricks, the group that spawned AOTP scored 43.64% in a comparison with rival hip-hop group Slum Village, who scored 56.34% as the G.O.A.T. rap group in the fourth installment of Ambrosia For Heads' annual battle series features.

On February 13, 2020, King Magnetic released his diss track towards Vinnie Paz entitled "Be Quiet", thus removing himself from the collective. The next day on February 14, 2020, Doap Nixon subsequently released another diss track towards Paz entitled "Leg Shot" on the same day as Paz's fourth studio album As Above So Below, thus removing himself from the collective as well. Within their tracks, they both announced their departure from the supergroup. The issues between the pair and Paz supposedly started in 2009 with numerous trivial matters which were all squashed in 2015. Magnetic caught up with Paz after his 2016 Jedi Mind Tricks show in Albuquerque, New Mexico and agreed to put aside the differences they had. However, with Nixon's release of Sour Diesel II, Paz threatened to remove his lyrics and track contributions on the album unless Nixon removed King Magnetic's verses from his album. This is what resulted in the releases of the diss track "Be Quiet" by Magnetic which was supposedly recorded many years earlier.

=== 2022–present: Death of Blacastan ===
In February 2022, it was reported that AOTP member Blacastan had died. As a result, members; Apathy, Celph Titled, Esoteric, Vinnie Paz, Crypt the Warchild, and Planetary reconnected again as Army of the Pharaohs to release the single "Blac Prime Minister" in May 2022 to pay tribute to Blacastan. This would be the first time after 8 years members performed as AOTP. The last time being with the release of their fifth studio album, Heavy Lies the Crown, in 2014.

== Album appearances ==
Rapper	The Torture Papers (2006)	Ritual of Battle (2007)	The Unholy Terror (2010)	In Death Reborn (2014)	Heavy Lies the Crown (2014)
Vinnie Paz	Yes	Yes	Yes	Yes	Yes
Celph Titled	Yes	Yes	Yes	Yes	Yes
Crypt the Warchild	Yes	Yes	Yes	Yes	Yes
Des Devious	Yes	Yes	Yes	Yes	Yes
Esoteric	Yes	Yes	Yes	Yes	Yes
King Syze	Yes	Yes	Yes	Yes	Yes
Planetary	Yes	Yes	Yes	Yes	Yes
Reef the Lost Cauze	Yes	Yes	Yes	Yes	Yes
Apathy	Yes	No	Yes	Yes	Yes
Demoz	No	Yes	Yes	Yes	Yes
Doap Nixon	No	Yes	Yes	Yes	Yes
Block McCloud	No	No	Yes	Yes	Yes
Blacastan	No	No	No	Yes	Yes
Zilla	No	No	No	Yes	Yes
Lawrence Arnell	No	No	No	Yes	Yes
King Magnetic	No	Yes	Yes	Yes	No
Jus Allah	No	Yes	Yes	No	No
Chief Kamachi	Yes	Yes	No	No	No
Faez One	Yes	No	No	No	No
Journalist	No	No	Yes	No	No

== Discography ==
Studio albums

- The Torture Papers (2006)
- Ritual of Battle (2007)
- The Unholy Terror (2010)
- In Death Reborn (2014)
- Heavy Lies the Crown (2014)
- TBA (2026)
