= Babygrande Records =

American record label

- Parent company: Babygrande Global
- Founded: 2001
- Founder: Chuck Wilson
- Distributor: Stem
- Genre: Hip-hop, electronic, rock
- Country of origin: United States
- Location: New York City
- Official website: babygrande.com

Babygrande Records is an American independent record label based in New York City, founded by Chuck Wilson. Babygrande is distributed by Stem.

== History ==
Babygrande Records was founded in 2001. The label's catalog includes genres such as hip-hop, indie rock, and EDM. Although distributed by The Orchard for many years, Babygrande moved to Stem for distribution.

== Artists currently on Babygrande Records (2020) ==
- Stove God Cooks
- The Burn Unit
- Cap Gold
- Drako
- ERT
- Ghasper
- GZA
- Liam Tracy
- Lil' Scrappy
- Mercy
- The Original Jet Life Crew
- Skylab 3
- Theaftrparty
- The Yutes

== Discography ==
The following is a discography for Babygrande Records, an independent record label based in New York City that specializes in hip-hop, electronic music, and indie rock. Artists such as Havoc, The Alchemist, GZA, U-God, Freeway, Kasim Keto, Journalist 103, Brand Nubian, and Jedi Mind Tricks have released records on Babygrande Records.

=== Studio albums ===
- 2003: Jedi Mind Tricks - The Psycho-Social, Chemical, Biological & Electro-Magnetic Manipulation of Human Consciousness (reissue)
- 2003: Mountain Brothers - Triple Crown
- 2003: Cherrywine - Bright Black
- 2003: Supernatural - The Lost Freestyle Files
- 2003: Canibus - Rip the Jacker
- 2003: Jedi Mind Tricks - Visions of Gandhi
- 2003: Jean Grae - The Bootleg of the Bootleg EP
- 2004: Sharkey - Sharkey's Machine
- 2004: Jedi Mind Tricks presents OuterSpace - Outerspace
- 2004: OuterSpace - Blood & Ashes
- 2004: 7L & Esoteric - DC2: Bars of Death
- 2004: Brand Nubian - Fire in the Hole
- 2004: Immortal Technique - Revolutionary Vol. 1 (reissue)
- 2004: Jedi Mind Tricks - Legacy of Blood
- 2004: Jean Grae - This Week
- 2004: Jedi Mind Tricks - Violent by Design (reissue)
- 2005: Purple City Productions - Road to the Riches: The Best of the Purple City Mixtapes
- 2005: Jus Allah - All Fates Have Changed
- 2005: 7L & Esoteric - Moment of Rarities
- 2005: Immortal Technique - Revolutionary Vol. 2 (reissue)
- 2005: Lawless Element - Soundvision: In Stereo
- 2005: Dreddy Kruger presents - Think Different Music Wu-Tang Meets the Indie Culture
- 2005: Purple City - Paris to Purple City
- 2005: Canibus - C True Hollywood Stories (reissue)
- 2005: Canibus - Mic Club: The Curriculum (reissue)
- 2005: Canibus - Hip-Hop for Sale
- 2005: Jakki Da Motamouth - God vs. Satan
- 2006: The Lost Children of Babylon - Where Light Was Created: The Equidivium (reissue)
- 2006: The Lost Children of Babylon - Words From the Duat: The Book of Anubis (reissue)
- 2006: The Lost Children of Babylon - The 911 Report: The Ultimate Conspiracy
- 2006: Apathy - Eastern Philosophy
- 2006: Army of the Pharaohs - The Torture Papers
- 2006: Bronze Nazareth - The Great Migration
- 2006: Purple City - Born to the Purple
- 2006: Purple City - The Purple Album
- 2006: DK - King Me Mixtape
- 2006: Agallah - Propane Piff Mixtape
- 2006: 7L & Esoteric - A New Dope
- 2006: Lord Jamar - The 5% Album
- 2006: Chief Kamachi - Concrete Gospel
- 2006: The Society of Invisibles - The Society of Invisibles
- 2006: Agallah - You Already Know
- 2006: Blue Sky Black Death - Blue Sky Black Death presents: The Holocaust
- 2006: OuterSpace - Blood Brothers
- 2006: Custom Made - Sidewalk Mindtalk
- 2006: Jedi Mind Tricks - Servants in Heaven, Kings in Hell
- 2006: Hi-Tek - Hi-Teknology 2: The Chip
- 2006: Bone Thugs-N-Harmony - Thug Stories
- 2007: J.R. Writer - Writer's Block 5
- 2007: Snowgoons - German Lugers
- 2007: Wisemen - Wisemen Approaching
- 2007: Cilvaringz - I
- 2007: Gillie da Kid - The Best of the GDK Mixtapes
- 2007: Sa-Ra - The Hollywood Recordings
- 2007: Polyrhythm Addicts - Break Glass
- 2007: Big Shug - Street Champ
- 2007: C-Rayz Walz & Sharkey - Monster Maker
- 2007: Ice Water Inc. - Polluted Water
- 2007: N.O.R.E. - Noreality
- 2007: Army of the Pharaohs - Ritual of Battle
- 2007: Blue Sky Black Death & Hell Razah - Razah's Ladder
- 2007: The Society of Invisibles - Episode 19
- 2007: Hi-Tek - Hi-Teknology 3: Underground
- 2008: Randam Luck - Conspiracy of Silence
- 2008: Blue Sky Black Death - Late Night Cinema
- 2008: Dame Grease - Goon Musik
- 2008: Ransom -Street Cinema
- 2008: T.H.U.G. Angelz (Hell Razah & Shabazz the Disciple) - Welcome to Red Hook Houses
- 2008: Snowgoons - Black Snow
- 2008: NYOIL - Hood Treason (Deluxe Edition)
- 2008: Doap Nixon - Sour Diesel
- 2008: Almighty - Original S.I.N.
- 2008: King Syze - The Labor Union
- 2008: Lil Dap - I.A.Dap
- 2008: OuterSpace - God's Fury
- 2008: Jedi Mind Tricks - A History of Violence
- 2008: Ras Kass - Institutionalized Vol. 2
- 2008: Hell Rell - Black Mask Black Gloves (The Ruga Edition)
- 2008: J.R Writer - Politics & Bullshit
- 2008: Diamond D - The Huge Hefner Chronicles
- 2008: Blue Sky Black Death & Jean Grae The Evil Jeanius
- 2008: GZA/Genius - Pro Tools
- 2009: Stoupe the Enemy of Mankind - Decalogue
- 2009: Fabio Musta - Passport
- 2009: Snowgoons & Savage Brothers feat. Lord Lhus - A Fist In The Thought
- 2009: U-God - Dopium
- 2009: Fred Money - Money Rules Tha World
- 2009: J.R. Writer - Cinecrack
- 2009: Randam Luck - Graveyard Shift
- 2009: J.R. Writer - Cinecrack 1.5
- 2009: Tiye Phoenix - Half Woman Half Amazin'
- 2009: Grand Puba - Retroactive
- 2010: 9th Prince - One Man Army
- 2010: 9th Prince - Grand Daddy Flow
- 2010: Group Home - Gifted Unlimited Rhymes Universal
- 2011: Rocky Business - A Rebel's Roar
- 2011: M.O.P. - Sparta
- 2012: Journalist 103 of The Left - Reporting Live
- 2012: Freeway - Diamond In the Ruff
- 2013: Kasim Keto - Long Car Rides
- 2016: Skylab 3 - A View From Above
- 2016: Grand Puba - Black from the Future
- 2016: Freeway - Free Will
- 2016: Havoc & The Alchemist - The Silent Partner
- 2016: Journalist 103 - Battle for the Hearts and Minds
- 2016: Smoke DZA & Pete Rock - Don't Smoke Rock

== Artists with releases on Babygrande Records ==
- 7L & Esoteric
- 9th Prince
- Agallah
- Almighty
- Apathy
- Army of the Pharaohs
- Big Shug
- Jet Life
- Blue Sky Black Death
- Bone Thugs-N-Harmony
- Brand Nubian
- Bronze Nazareth
- C-Rayz Walz
- Canibus
- Chief Kamachi
- Cilvaringz
- Custom Made
- Dame Grease
- Diamond D
- DK
- Doap Nixon
- Dreddy Kruger
- Fabio Musta
- Fred Money
- Freeway
- Gillie da Kid
- Grand Puba
- Group Home
- Hell Razah
- Hell Rell
- Hi-Tek
- Ice Water Inc.
- Immortal Technique
- J.R. Writer
- Jakki da Motamouth
- Jean Grae
- Jedi Mind Tricks
- Journalist 103
- Jus Allah
- Kasim Keto
- King Syze
- Lawless Element
- Lee Bannon
- Lil Dap
- Lord Jamar
- M.O.P.
- Mountain Brothers
- N.O.R.E.
- NYOIL
- OuterSpace
- Pete Rock
- Polyrhythm Addicts
- Purple City Productions
- Raekwon
- Randam Luck
- Ransom
- Ras Kass
- Rocky Business
- Sa-Ra
- Shabazz the Disciple
- Sharkey
- Skylab 3
- Smoke DZA
- Snowgoons
- Stoupe the Enemy of Mankind
- Supernatural
- T.H.U.G. Angelz
- The Lost Children of Babylon
- The Society of Invisibles
- Tiye Phoenix
- U-God
- Wisemen

== See also ==
- List of record labels
