= 7L & Esoteric =

American hip-hop duo

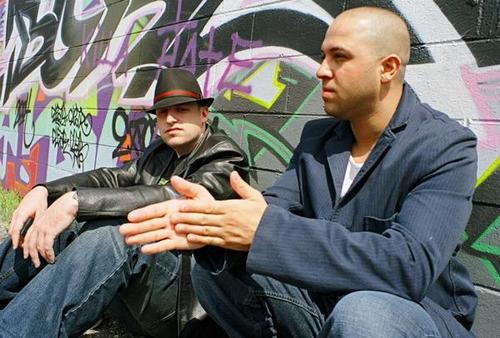
- 7L (right) and Esoteric in 2014

Background information
- Origin: Boston, Massachusetts, U.S.
- Genres: East Coast hip-hop; political hip-hop
- Years active: 1993–present
- Labels: Babygrande; Fly Casual Creative; Brick
- Members: 7L (George Andrinopoulos); Esoteric (Seamus Ryan)

7L & Esoteric (7LES) are an American underground hip-hop duo from Boston, Massachusetts, known for battle rhymes and boom bap production. 7L is the duo's DJ/producer and Esoteric is the MC. 7L & Esoteric are both prominent members of underground hip-hop collectives Army of the Pharaohs and Demigodz, as well as being 2/3 of Czarface along with Wu-Tang Clan member Inspectah Deck.

== History ==
=== The Soul Purpose, Dangerous Connection & DC2: Bars of Death (2000–2005) ===
7L & Esoteric released their debut LP The Soul Purpose in the summer of 2001. The single "Call Me E.S." charted at #83 on the Billboard hip-hop singles chart.

=== Czarface & Every Hero Needs a Villain (2011–present) ===
In 2011, it was announced that 7L & Esoteric had formed a hip-hop trio with Wu-Tang Clan member Inspectah Deck called Czarface and that they were working on a self-titled debut album. The album was released on February 19, 2013. The album features guest appearances from Roc Marciano, Oh No, Ghostface Killah, Action Bronson, Cappadonna and Vinnie Paz. The album's production comes from 7L, Spada4 and DJ Premier. In 2014, 7L produced the track The King's Curse on the Army of the Pharaohs album Heavy Lies the Crown, their second album in 2014 (next to In Death Reborn). Esoteric has a verse on the track, which makes it the first appearance of the duo together since the Czarface album. Later that year, the duo appeared on a track called Hard Hats and Timbs from the EP Year of the Hyenas by Army of the Pharaohs rappers Reef the Lost Cauze and King Syze. The track features raps from Esoteric and production from 7L.

A sequel to Czarface called Every Hero Needs a Villain was released on June 16, 2015. The album's first single, "Deadly Class" (featuring Meyhem Lauren), was released on April 7, 2015.

== Discography ==
=== Studio albums ===
- Speaking Real Words EP – Direct Records / Landspeed 1999
- The Soul Purpose – Direct Records / Landspeed 2001
- Dangerous Connection – Brick Records 2002
- DC2: Bars of Death – Babygrande Records 2004
- A New Dope – Babygrande Records 2006
- Dope Not Hype (mixtape, limited pressing) – 2006
- 1212 – Fly Casual Creative 2010

=== Compilations ===
- Rebel Alliance LP – Brick Records 1996
- DJ Revolution – R2K – 1999
- DJ Spinna presents – Urban Theory – Beat Suite – 2000
- Moment of Rarities – Babygrande Records 2005

== Collaborations ==
- Demigodz – The Godz Must Be Crazy EP – 2002 (Ill Boogie)
- Vinyl Thug Music (7L & Beyonder) – Vinyl Thug Music – 2003
- Vinyl Thug Music (7L & Beyonder) – Welcome to Shaftville U.S.A. – 2005
- Army of the Pharaohs – The Torture Papers – 2006 (Babygrande Records)
- Army of the Pharaohs – Ritual of Battle – 2007 (Babygrande Records)
- East Coast Avengers – Prison Planet – 2008 (Esoteric, Tha Trademarc, DC The Midi Alien)
- Army of the Pharaohs – The Unholy Terror – 2010 (Babygrande/Enemy Soil)
- Demigodz – Killmatic – 2013 (Dirty Version)
- Esoteric & Stu Bangas – Machete Mode – 2013 (Man Bites Dog)
- Army of the Pharaohs – In Death Reborn – 2014 (Enemy Soil)
- Army of the Pharaohs – Heavy Lies the Crown – 2014 (Enemy Soil)
- Czarface – Czarface (with Inspectah Deck as Czarface) – 2013 (Brick Records)
- Czarface – Every Hero Needs a Villain (with Inspectah Deck as Czarface) – 2015 (Brick Records)
- Czarface – A Fistful of Peril (with Inspectah Deck as Czarface) – 2016 (Silver Age)
- Czarface & MF Doom – Czarface Meets Metal Face – 2018 (Get on Down)
- Czarface & Ghostface Killah – Czarface Meets Ghostface – 2019 (Silver Age)
- Czarface – The Odd Czar Against Us – 2019 (Silver Age)
- Czarface & MF Doom – Super What? – 2021 (Silver Age)
- Czarface – Czarmageddon! – 2022 (Silver Age)
- Czarface – CZARTIFICIAL INTELLIGENCE – 2023 (Silver Age)
- Stress Eater (Czarface & Kool Keith) – Everybody Eats! – 2024 (Silver Age)
- Czarface & Frankie Pulitzer – Czarface Meets Frankie Pulitzer – 2026 (Silver Age)
