= Apathy discography =

Music of underground rapper Apathy

- Studio albums: 8
- Extended plays: 3
- Compilation albums: 5
- Mixtapes: 2
- Collaborative albums: 4

This is the discography of Apathy, an American rapper from Willimantic, Connecticut.

== Albums ==
=== Studio albums ===
Title	Album details
Eastern Philosophy	Released: March 21, 2006; Label: Babygrande; Format: CD, LP, digital download
Wanna Snuggle?	Released: October 6, 2009; Label: Demigodz; Format: CD, digital download
Honkey Kong	Released: August 23, 2011; Label: Dirty Version; Format: CD, LP, digital download
Connecticut Casual	Released: June 3, 2014; Label: Dirty Version; Format: CD, LP, cassette, digital download
Handshakes with Snakes	Released: June 6, 2016; Label: Dirty Version; Format: CD, LP, cassette, digital download
The Widow's Son	Released: March 2, 2018; Label: Dirty Version; Format: CD, LP, cassette, digital download
Where the River Meets the Sea	Released: May 28, 2021; Label: Dirty Version; Format: CD, LP, cassette, digital download
Connecticut Casual: Chapter 2	Released: April 12, 2024; Label: Dirty Version; Format: CD, LP, cassette, digital download
Mom & Dad	Released: June 13, 2025; Label: Anchors Up; Format: CD, LP, cassette, digital download

=== Collaborative albums ===
Title	Album details
No Place Like Chrome (with Celph Titled)	Released: August 14, 2006; Label: Antidote; Format: CD, LP, digital download
Uzi Does It (with Ryu and Scoop DeVille as Get Busy Committee)	Released: October 27, 2009; Label: Tokyo Sex Whale; Format: CD, digital download
Perestroika (with O.C. as Perestroika)	Released: September 22, 2017; Label: Dirty Version; Format: CD, LP, cassette, digital download
King of Gods. No Second (with Stu Bangas)	Released: December 9, 2022; Label: Dirty Version; Format: CD, LP, cassette, digital download

=== Compilation albums ===
Title	Album details
It's the Bootleg, Muthafuckas!, Volume One	Released: 2003; Label: Demigodz; Format: CD, digital download
Hell's Lost and Found: It's the Bootleg, Muthafuckas!, Volume 2	Released: 2007; Label: Demigodz; Format: CD, digital download
It's the Bootleg, Muthafuckas!, Volume 3: Fire Walk With Me	Released: 2012; Label: Demigodz, Dirty Version; Format: CD, digital download
The Alien Tongue	Released: 2012; Label: Demigodz, Dirty Version; Format: CD, digital download
It's the Bootleg, Muthafuckas!, Volume 4: The Black Lodge	Released: 2015; Label: Dirty Version; Format: CD, digital download

=== Instrumental albums ===
Title	Album details
Dive Medicine: Chapter 1	Released: March 17, 2017; Label: Dirty Version; Format: CD, LP, cassette, digital download

== Extended plays ==
Title	EP details
Make Alotta Money	Released: October 8, 2010; Label: Demigodz; Format: CD, digital download
Primate Mindstate	Released: August 23, 2011; Label: Demigodz; Format: CD, digital download
Weekend at the Cape	Released: June 30, 2015; Label: Dirty Version; Format: CD, digital download

== Mixtapes ==
Title	Mixtape details
Where's Your Album?	Released: 2004; Label: Demigodz; Format: CD, LP, digital download
Baptism by Fire	Released: 2007; Label: Demigodz; Format: CD, digital download

== Guest appearances ==
Title	Year	Other artist(s)	Album
"The Three Immortals"	1997	Jedi Mind Tricks, Breath of Judah	The Psycho-Social, Chemical, Biological & Electro-Magnetic; Manipulation of Human Consciousness
"Omnicron"	1997	Jedi Mind Tricks, Sun Pharaoh	The Psycho-Social, Chemical, Biological & Electro-Magnetic; Manipulation of Human Consciousness
"The Apostles' Creed"	1997	Jedi Mind Tricks, Yan the Phenomenon	The Psycho-Social, Chemical, Biological & Electro-Magnetic; Manipulation of Human Consciousness
"Public Execution"	2001	7L & Esoteric, Celph Titled	The Soul Purpose
"Speak Now"	2002	7L & Esoteric, Vinnie Paz	Dangerous Connection
"Playing With Fire"	2003	Styles of Beyond, Celph Titled	Megadef
"Best Friends"	2003	Louis Logic	Sin-A-Matic
"Way of the Gun"	2004	7L & Esoteric, Celph Titled, Lord Digga	DC2: Bars of Death
"Yell At Us"	2004	7L & Esoteric, Celph Titled	DC2: Bars of Death
"Drive It Like I Stole It"	2005	—N/a	Midnight Club 3: DUB edition Soundtrack
"If You Forgot My Name"	2009	Tone Spliff, Royce Da 5'9"	Authentic
"Suicide Music"	2012	Ryu, Scoop DeVille	The Raid: Redemption
"Battle Hymn"	2012	Vinnie Paz, King Syze, Crypt the Warchild, Jus Allah, Esoteric, Blacastan, Celph Titled, Planetary	God of the Serengeti
"Dumb It Down"	2012	Styles of Beyond	Reseda Beach
"Dunky Fividends"	2012	Styles of Beyond	Reseda Beach
"Colossal Beasts"	2013	Swollen Members, Esoteric, Celph Titled	Beautiful Death Machine
"Exoskeletons"	2013	Psych Ward, Celph Titled	More Slime
"America"	2016	La Coka Nostra	To Thine Own Self Be True

== Production discography ==
Title	Year	Other artist(s)	Album
"Call My Name"	2012	Styles of Beyond	Reseda Beach
"Go Outside"	2013	Adil Omar	The Mushroom Cloud Effect
"The People's Champ"	2013	R.A. the Rugged Man	Legends Never Die

== Music videos ==
As lead performer
Year	Album title	Title	Director	Featured artist
2010	Eastern Philosophy	The Winter	n/c	Blue Rapsberry, Poison Pen
2011	Honkey Kong	Check to Check	Anthony DeRose	
2011	Honkey Kong	Peace Connecticut	"Open" Mike & Greg LaRose	
2011	Honkey Kong	Stop What Ya Doin'	Nicholas Heller	Celph Titled
2014	Connecticut Casual	The Grand Leveler	Reel Wolf Productions	
2014	Connecticut Casual	Martha Moxley (RIP)	Andrew Camacho	
2014	Connecticut Casual	The Curse of the Kennedys	Andrew Camacho	
2015	Weekend At The Cape	How To Breathe Underwater	Apathy & Andrew Camacho	Suave-Ski, Jus Cuz
2015	Weekend At The Cape	Block Island Sound / The Pendulum Swings	Apathy	Locksmith, Blacastan
2016	Handshakes With Snakes	Attention Deficit Disorder	Shane McLellan	
2016	Handshakes With Snakes	Pieces of Eight	"Open" Mike & Greg LaRose	

As featured artist
Year	Artist	Title	Director	Other featured artist
2010	Get Busy Committee	Opening Ceremony	Alex/2Tone	
2010	Get Busy Committee	I Don't Care About You	n/c	
2012	Diggaz With Attitude	The Gusto	R.M.L.	Roc Marciano, Step Brothers
2012	Diggaz With Attitude	Casino Royale	R.M.L.	Blacastan
2012	Diggaz With Attitude	Half Dead	R.M.L.	Roc Marciano, Planet Asia
2013	Demigodz	Demigodz Is Back	Andrew Camacho	
2013	Demigodz	Dead In The Middle	"Open" Mike & Greg LaRose	
2013	Hayze	Smokers Section	Andrew Camacho	
2013	Hayze	Life Is Hell	Andrew Camacho	
2013	Demigodz	Worst Nightmare	"Open" Mike & Greg LaRose	
2013	Demigodz	Raiders Cap	Nicholas Heller	
2013	Suicide Kingz	Shotcallaz	Mike McLaughlin	Celph Titled
2013	Motive	Rat In A Cage	n/c	
2013	Esoteric & Stu Bangas	The Danger	R.M.L.	Vinnie Paz, Celph Titled
2014	Army of the Pharaohs	God's Particle	Jimmy Giambrone & Steve Perrong	
2014	Merkules	Bottom Line	Stuey Kubrick	Celph Titled
2014	Army of the Pharaohs	Broken Safeties	Debely	
2014	Army of the Pharaohs	The Demon's Blade	Sam Lipman-Stern	
2014	Chris Webby	Tread Lightly	n/c	
2014	Army of the Pharaohs	Terrorstorm	Prime Cut	
2014	Snowgoons	Jesus Gun	SirQLate	Celph Titled, Antihelden
2017	Blacastan	Summa Cum Laude	Andrew Camacho	
2017	Perestroika	Soviet Official	Suave-Ski	

== See also ==
- Army of the Pharaohs discography
- Get Busy Committee discography
