= Styles of Beyond discography =

- Studio albums: 3
- Singles: 15
- Music videos: 6
- Mixtapes: 2
- Compilations: 12
- Guest appearances: 9

The discography of the hip hop group Styles of Beyond.

== Studio albums ==
- 2000 Fold (1997, Bilawn)
- Megadef (2003, Spy Tech)
- Reseda Beach (2012, Dirty Version)

== Singles and EPs ==
- "Killer Instinct" (1997, Bilawn)
- "Many Styles" (1998, Ideal)
- "Spies Like Us" (1998, Bilawn)
- "Atomic Zen" (Split with Emanon) (1999, Rocketship)
- "Easy Back It Up" (1999, Hi-Ho)
- "Spies Like Us" (Remix) (1999, Ideal)
- "Ambiguous Figures" (Split with Ugly Duckling) (1999, Loosegroove/No Mayo)
- "Word Perfect" (Split with Dilated Peoples) (1999, Rah Rah)
- "Subculture" (2001, Spy Tech)
- "Subculture" (The projectHUMAN Remixes) (2002, Human Imprint)
- "Mr. Brown" (2003, Ill Boogie)
- "Pay Me" (2003, Spy Tech/Ill Boogie)
- "Style Tips" (2006, Spy Tech)
- Styles of Beyond: Grant Mohrman Remixes (Download only) (2007, Position)
- "Damn (featuring Michael Bublé)" (2012, Dirty Version)

== Music videos ==
- "Easy Back It Up"
- "Spies Like Us"
- "Spies Like Us (Remix)"
- "Be Your Dog"
- "Pay Me"
- "Bleach"

== Mixtapes ==
- Razor Tag (Presented by DJ Green Lantern) (2007)
- Razor Tag: Key Cuts EP (2007)

== Compilation appearances ==
- The World Famous Beat Junkies Volume 2 (1998, Blackberry) (Song: "Style Wars")
- O.L.C. (1999, Rah Rah) (Song: "Word Perfect")
- The Funky Precedent (1999, Loosegroove) (Song: "Ambiguous Figures")
- ProjectHUMAN (2002, Human Imprint) (Songs: "Subculture" (Dieselboy + Kaos VIP Remix) and "Subculture" (Dylan + Ink Remix))
- Perfecto Presents Ultra Music Festival: 01 (2003, Thrive) (Song: "Subculture" (Dieselboy + Kaos VIP Remix))
- The Mic Planet Sessions (2003, Insomniac) (Song: "Atomic Zen")
- Who's America? (2004, System) (Song: "Subculture" (Dieselboy + Kaos VIP Remix))
- DJ /rupture vs. Mutamassik Shotgun Wedding Vol. 1—The Bidoun Sessions (2004, Violent Turd) (Song: "Mr. Brown" (Biddy Bi-Bi Remix Instrumental))
- Very Special People (2004, Val Jerk) (Song: "The Real")
- "NFS: Most Wanted [2005]" (2006, EA) (Song: "Nine Thou (Superstars Remix)")
- The Human Resource (2006, Human Imprint) (Song: "Subculture" (Upbeats Remix))
- Transformers: The Album (2007, Warner Bros.) (Song: "Second to None")
- Sound Chronicles Volume One (2007, Soundchron) (Song: "The Real")
- URB Sampler 99.02 (1999, URB Magazine) (Song: "Back It Up")

== Guest appearances ==
- Space Boy Boogie X – "Underground Sound" (Split single with The Pharcyde) (1999, Soul Unit)
- Divine Styler – "Nova" and "Microphenia" from Wordpower, Vol. 2: Directrix (1999, Mo' Wax)
- Divine Styler – "Terraform" from Contemplation Sompilation (2001, Electromatrix)
- Mountain Brothers – "Microphone Phenomenal" (Remix) (2002, Babygrande)
- Apathy – "Can't Nobody" from Where's Your Album?!! Mixtape (2004, Demigodz)
- Celldweller – "Shapeshifter" Single (2005, Fixt Music)
- Celph Titled – "Playin' with Fire" from The Gatalog: A Collection of Chaos (2006, Demigodz/Endless)
- Apathy – "Live at the BBQ", "Godz in da Front", and "Bring It Back" from Hell's Lost & Found: It's The Bootleg, Muthafuckas! Volume 2 (2007, Demigodz/Endless)
- 4-Zone – "Off Safety" Sound Chronicles Volume One Compilation (2007, Soundchron)
- Common – "Back Home" from The Uncommon Collection Vol. 2 (2008, white label)

== With Fort Minor ==
- We Major (mixtape) (2005, Machine Shop Recordings/Warner Bros.)
- "Believe Me" (2005, Machine Shop Recordings/Warner Bros.)
- "Petrified" (2005, Machine Shop Recordings/Warner Bros.)
- The Rising Tied (2005, Machine Shop Recordings/Warner Bros.)

== Solo releases ==
=== Ryu ===
- Solo Tracks:
  - Paper Planes - (With Veze Skante)
  - The Most Shady - (Produced by Scoop DeVille)
- Guest appearances:
  - Tweekend (Name of the Game and Ready for Action)
  - Tropic Thunder soundtrack (2008, Lakeshore) (Song: "Name of the Game" (The Crystal Method's Big Ass T.T. Mix))
  - Unsung Heroes - (Gatorade Commercial)
  - Algae - (with Talksicc)
  - Rock (Remix) - (with Lexicon)
  - The OfficiaL - (with Lexicon)
  - Keep the Rats Movin - (with Awol One)
  - Speak Ya Clout - (with Apathy)
  - Dawn of the Decade - (with Emanon)
  - O'Doyle Rules - (with Apathy, Mac Lethal and various artists)
  - Recharged (with Linkin Park) (Song: "Skin to Bone (Nick Catchdubs Remix) (with Cody B. Ware))

==== Get Busy Committee ====
- NOTE: Get Busy Committee is a creative project formed by Ryu, Apathy of Demigodz, and producer Scoop DeVille.
- Digital/Promo Singles
  - My Little Razor Blade - (2008) (Ryu, Apathy)
  - Come Talk to Me - (2009) (Ryu, Apathy, Prod. Scoop DeVille)
  - No Time to Speak - (2009) (Ryu, Apathy, Prod. Scoop DeVille)
- Soundtracks
  - The Raid: Redemption soundtrack - (2012) (Song: "Suicide Music")

=== Tak ===
- Solo Tracks:
  - Heartless Game
  - Lady Killa (Produced by Voski, from The Gold Rush)
- Solo Albums/EPs:
  - Red Rum - (Single with Josy B.)
  - The Publik Bizzares EP - (Instrumental EP)
  - Taknology - (Upcoming/TBA EP)
  - Whiskey Hill - (Upcoming/TBA debut solo album)

=== Cheapshot ===
- Vinyl:
  - Cheapshot's Sucka' Breaks: Beat (Downs), Cuts & Nosebleeds - (1998 12" vinyl release)
- Mixtapes:
  - Mega Dudical! - (CD/2007)
  - Party Mouth! - (CD/2007, with DJ Marshall Barnes)
  - Jazzercidal Tendencies - (CD/2008)
  - Club Footed - (CD/2009)
  - Mega Dudical 2! - (Upcoming/TBA)
