= Reseda Beach =

Studio album by Styles of Beyond
- Released: October 23, 2012
- Recorded: 2007–2008, 2012
- Genre: Hip-hop
- Length: 44:28 (Disc 1); 58:04 (Disc 2)
- Label: Dirty Version Records
- Producers: Apathy; Aqua; DJ Cheapshot; J Dilla; Mike Shinoda; Rick Rock; Scoop DeVille; Vin Skully

Styles of Beyond chronology
Razor Tag (2007)	Reseda Beach (2012)

Singles from Reseda Beach
- 1. "Second to None" Released: October 23, 2012

Reseda Beach (originally known or dubbed as Rocket Surgery) is Los Angeles underground rap group Styles of Beyond's third studio album, as well as their fourth and final project, released on Dirty Version Records in 2012 after their 2007 installment Razor Tag. Reseda Beach was digitally released on October 23, 2012, that is available on iTunes. The album was produced by Fort Minor rapper and Linkin Park co-vocalist Mike Shinoda. In every digital version of the album (except in Amazon), there's a bonus track for disc 2 named Godz in the Front, also from Razor Tag and taken from the second volume of Apathy's compilation album collection It's the Bootleg, Muthafuckas!.

== Background and promotion ==
This is the last known effort by Ryu for any group. Before this took place, he was with rap duo Get Busy Committee which was the featuring artist with Shinoda on the track "SUICIDE.MUSIC" for Shinoda's collaborated soundtrack/score, The Raid: Redemption with Joseph Trapanese. Ryu alone acted as featuring artist later. His latest work was with American rock band Linkin Park on their second remix album Recharged for the track "Skin to Bone (Nick Catchdubs Remix)", which also features Cody B. Ware. The album acts as a studio album for the group. but in the long form it also acts a greatest hits/compilation album, due to its features of many songs, which were included in their previous installments, and some which were not released as a track in the albums but as a bonus track or a limited edition track. Whereas the album also includes new songs by the group. The album includes whole Ryu's raps from S.O.B. except from "Second to None", which has Tak's second verse in it. This is why it was released as single from the album digitally from the Demigodz stores, but was later taken off of them.

The album was not well promoted but Shinoda made an appeal to his fans to hear the album by the medium of Twitter and his official website.

== Reception ==
Professional ratings
Review scores
Source	Rating
RapReviews	(8/10)
Kevinnottingham	9/10 stars

The album was critically very successful. In the review by RapReviews, the album was explained as, "To be fair, I'm not sure whether to be happy or bummed out that there's a J. Dilla track called "Hard" on this album. The track is unquestionably dope, and as many delays as there have been in S.O.B.'s career, it's not hard to believe this song dates back to when he was still alive - not a Johnny-come-lately buying one of his cataloged beats long after his demise. In fact it's so good that it probably should have come out years ago as a single - not that it necessarily would have gone mainstream but every underground mixtape and club DJ would have been bumping the shit anyway. Ultimately I give up trying to date this material though because songs like the Skully and Cheapshot collaboration for "Sugar Honey Iced Tea" is dope in 1999, 2005 or 2012 - take your pick. Let's not point fingers at these Cali rappers for slacking on their discography, Shinoda for not promoting them when they were under his thumb, or the industry as a whole for not finding a place for them when they were so hot. Let's just be glad Reseda Beach finally came out and no longer matter how long the wait. It was worth it."

== Track listing ==
Disc 1
No.	Title	Producer(s)	Length
1.	"Here We Go"	Scoop DeVille	3:30
2.	"Hard"	J Dilla	3:20
3.	"Sugar Honey Iced Tea"	Vin Skully; DJ Cheapshot	3:31
4.	"Take That" (featuring Celph Titled)	Aqua	3:24
5.	"Call My Name"	Apathy	2:22
6.	"Bumble Bee (skit)" (starring Alex 2Tone)		2:11
7.	"The Pirate Song"	Vin Skully; Apathy	3:22
8.	"Damn"	Vin Skully; DJ Cheapshot	2:54
9.	"Dumb It Down" (featuring Apathy)	Apathy; Mike Shinoda	3:34
10.	"Howdy Doody"	DJ Cheapshot; Vin Skully	3:08
11.	"Live from Ibiza (skit)" (starring Alex 2Tone)		0:29
12.	"You Love Us" (featuring Somaya Reece)	Vin Skully	2:41
13.	"Shut Everything Down" (featuring Celph Titled)	Vin Skully; Apathy	3:48
14.	"Dunky Fividends" (featuring Apathy)	Vin Skully	3:50
15.	"Second to None" (featuring Mike Shinoda)	Mike Shinoda	3:05
16.	"The Valley" (Outro) (starring Alex 2Tone)		3:43
Total length:			44:28

Disc 2
No.	Title	Length
1.	"Gats 'N Party Hats"	3:20
2.	"Hard" (Remix)	4:09
3.	"It's Us"	2:31
4.	"Hey You" (featuring Mike Shinoda)	2:18
5.	"You Cannot Fuck with This" (featuring Celph Titled)	3:09
6.	"Here We Come"	2:16
7.	"World Famous"	3:13
8.	"Bring It Back" (featuring Apathy, Motive and Celph Titled)	3:12
9.	"Murderer" (featuring Celph Titled)	3:20
10.	"Live at the BBQ" (featuring Apathy, Motive and Celph Titled)	3:00
11.	"The Story Begins"	2:16
12.	"Bangin' S.O.B."	3:28
13.	"Kill 'em in the Face" (featuring Scoop DeVille)	3:15
14.	"Get Involved"	3:29
15.	"They Don't Know"	2:53
16.	"Journey"	2:15
17.	"Savin' L.A." (featuring Bishop Lamont)	4:06
18.	"Radio Clash"	2:20
19.	"Kick Me Out"	2:05
20.	"Chill Pill" (featuring Apathy)	3:29
21.	"Godz in the Front (Digital Bonus Track)" (featuring Demigodz)	4:49
Total length:		57:64

== Credits ==
Styles of Beyond

- Ryu (Ryan Maginn) - vocals
- Tak (Takbir Bashir) - vocals
- DJ Cheapshot - turntables
- Vin Skully - producer

Additional credits

- Mike Shinoda - additional vocals, producer
- Apathy - additional vocals, producer
- Open Mic - graphics
- Chris Barnett - management
- J Dilla - producer
- Scoop DeVille - additional vocals, producer
