= The Gatalog: A Collection of Chaos =

Studio album by Celph Titled
- Released: October 24, 2006
- Recorded: 1998–2006
- Genre: Hip hop
- Length: 4:32:45
- Label: Endless Recording Company; Demigodz Records
- Producer: Various

Celph Titled chronology
The Gatalog: A Collection of Chaos	The Fresh Prince of Hell's Lair (TBA)

The Gatalog: A Collection of Chaos is a compilation album by underground rapper and Army of the Pharaohs/Demigodz member Celph Titled. The album was released with a four disc special. Mercer released a compilation titled The Gatalog, a four-disc set of his guest appearances and freestyles, going back to his early releases from 1998, as his official first offering to a thriving fanbase that already viewed him as a seasoned veteran. After the release of The Gatalog and a move back to Tampa, Mercer spent three years working with the Diggin' In The Crates (D.I.T.C.) multi-platinum producer, Buckwild, on his first album, Nineteen Ninety Now, released on October 26, 2010, on No Sleep Recordings.

== Track listing ==
=== Disc 1 ===
No.	Title	Producer(s)	Length
1.	"Primo's Four Course Meal"	DJ Premier	3:26
2.	"Playin' With Fire" (Feat. Apathy & Styles of Beyond)	DJ Cheapshot	3:50
3.	"Spoiled Rotten"	J-Zone	2:47
4.	"Way of the Gun" (Feat. Apathy, Lord Digga, 7L & Esoteric)	Apathy	3:34
5.	"Diablos" (Feat. Louis Logic)	J.J. Brown	3:42
6.	"So Cold" (Feat. Oktober)	Black Panther	3:05
7.	"All About Drama" (Feat. Ali Vegas, Big Scoob & Sleepy Eyes)	Chop D.I.E.S.E.L.	4:41
8.	"Clap" (Feat. Cashmere the Pro & Oktober)	Kno	4:08
9.	"Never the Least"	Celph Titled	1:44
10.	"Guerilla Orchestra" (Feat. Apathy & Tino Vega)	Celph Titled	3:16
11.	"The Battle" (Feat. Mike Shinoda)	Mike Shinoda	1:16
12.	"Revaporate" (Feat. Dutchmassive & Majok Most)	Celph Titled	3:54
13.	"Down & Dirty About My Scratch"	Mekalek	2:03
14.	"Who's Fucking Around (Remix)" (Feat. K.Skills)	Celph Titled	2:50
15.	"Rock (Remix)" (Feat. J-Zone, Lexicon, Louis Logic & Ryu)	DJ Cheapshot	4:56
16.	"Fahrenheit 813" (Feat. Dutchmassive & Majik Most)	Celph Titled	3:15
17.	"The Countdown Theory" (Feat. Walkmen)	Celph Titled	3:55
18.	"Hold Something" (Feat. Dutchmassive)	Celph Titled	3:37

=== Disc 2 ===
No.	Title	Producer(s)	Length
1.	"Turntable Science (feat) DJ Skully"	Celph Titled	3:23
2.	"Yell At Us" ((Feat. Apathy, 7L & Esoteric)	DJ 7L	4:31
3.	"Right Now"	The 45 King	3:55
4.	"All Out War" (Feat. Lyrical Commission)	Celph Titled	4:42
5.	"Eatadiccup" (Feat. J-Zone)	J-Zone	2:59
6.	"Just A Feelin'" (Feat. Majik Most)	Fred Nukes	3:50
7.	"Without A Warning" (Feat. The 1 Shanti)	ElekTro4	2:46
8.	"Devastating MC's" (Feat. Apathy & Esoteric)	Celph Titled	4:20
9.	"S.C.O.M." (Feat. Juelz Santana, Mike Shinoda & Ryu)	Mike Shinoda	3:53
10.	"Represent" (Feat. Apathy & Motive)	DJ Premier	3:21
11.	"The Final Word" (Feat. L-Fudge)	Celph Titled	4:26
12.	"7L Freestyle" (Feat. Big Scoob & Terra)	DJ 7L	2:52
13.	"Extra Thug Sauce" (Feat. Majik Most & Guttamouf)	J-Zone	4:44
14.	"616 Rewind" (Feat. Cunninlynguists, Kshal-Tee, Sankofa & Tonedeff)	Deacon 'Da Villain'	4:14
15.	"Tropic States" (Feat. Dutchmassive, Murdock, Primetyme, RK, Tino Vega & Vocab)	Celph Titled	4:49
16.	"Inaudible"	DR Peeriod	2:47
17.	"Fallout" (Feat. Dutchmassive & Walkmen)	Celph Titled	3:53
18.	"Critical Conditions" (Feat. Dutchmassive & Vex)	Celph Titled	4:26
19.	"Do That" (Feat. Dutchmassive)	Celph Titled	3:45

=== Disc 3 ===
No.	Title	Producer(s)	Length
1.	"Blao!" (F/ Fabolous, Hot Karl & Redman)	Celph Titled	4:07
2.	"Me & My Friends" (F/ Apathy & One Two))	Cheapshot / Cuts by Chum	3:19
3.	"Stuck Up (Stick 'Em Remix)" (F/ Majik Most & Eternia)	Apathy	3:19
4.	"F-L-A Team" (F/ Murdock & Tino Vega)	Celph Titled	3:59
5.	"Demigodz Clap" (F/ Apathy, Ryu, Motive, Tak & Esoteric)	Apathy	3:17
6.	"Extra Thug Sauce (Original Mix)" (F/ Guttamouf & Majik Most)	The White Shadow of Norway	4:02
7.	"The Revolution" (F/ Outerspace)	Celph Titled	3:17
8.	"Open The Mic" (F/ Jay Love, Louis Logic, J-Zone & J.J. Brown)	The Avid Record Collector	3:46
9.	"Panic" (F/ Richbums)	Lil' Jay	2:53
10.	"Who What When Where" (F/ Majik Most)	Snowgoons & Celph Titled	3:48
11.	"Tampahiphop.com Freestyle"	Buckwild	1:23
12.	"Pit Of The Flame" (F/ Dutchmassive & Majik Most)	J.J. Brown / Cuts by J.J. Brown	4:44
13.	"All Night" (F/ Apathy & Tak)	Apathy & Mike Shinoda	3:29
14.	"Mother Molesters Freestyle" (F/ Apathy & Majik Most)	Apathy	2:28
15.	"It Ain't"	Celph Titled / Cuts by Crossphada	4:07
16.	"DJ Unknown & Mekalek Freestyle" (F/ J-Zone, Al-Shid & Rok One)	DJ Unknown & Mekalek	6:15
17.	"Forever" (F/ Kimani of the Masterminds, L-Fudge, Mr. Rictor & Mr. Complex)	Celph Titled / Cuts by Kramtronix	3:57
18.	"Windows 98" (F/ Majik Most)	Celph Titled / Cuts by Kramtronix	2:54
19.	"Phantasmagoria" (F/ Araknophobix, Dutchmassive, Maleko & Raj)	Deeskee / Cuts by Deeskee	4:22

=== Disc 4 ===
No.	Title	Producer(s)	Length
1.	"Floss Filthy" (F/ Big Scoob)	Celph Titled	3:54
2.	"Political Gangstas" (F/ Apathy)	8TH	3:38
3.	"Baldwin Brothers" (F/ Majik Most)	Celph Titled	3:34
4.	"Murder Death Kill" (F/ Esoteric)	DC the MIDI Alien	2:56
5.	"Can't Leave Rap Alone" (F/ Apathy)	Apathy / Cuts by Chum the Skrilla Guerilla	3:24
6.	"Big Dummy" (F/ Mareko)	Celph Titled	3:49
7.	"Who's Fuckin' Around" (F/ K-Skills)	P-Original / Cuts by J.J. Brown	2:58
8.	"Silence & I" (F/ Vinnie Paz & King Syze)	Shuko	4:14
9.	"Cover & Duck" (F/ Styles of Beyond & Mike Shinoda)	Mike Shinoda	4:34
10.	"Skrilla Guerilla Freestyle"	Rick Rock	0:55
11.	"Shhhh!" (F/ Apathy)	Brian Kidd	2:56
12.	"You Ain't Seen It Comin'" (F/ Highcollide & Paradox)	Celph Titled / Cuts by Kramtronix	4:35
13.	"Mother Molesters Freestyle (MILF Mix)" (F/ Apathy & Majik Most)	Apathy	2:35
14.	"All Out War (Prowla Remix)" (F/ Lyrical Commission)	Prowla / Cuts by Terntable Jediz	4:14
15.	"Real Villains" (F/ Guttamouf, Lord Digga & Majik Most)	Get Large & Celph Titled	3:55
16.	"Yell At Us (Devastator Remix)" (F/ Apathy & Esoteric)	7L & Celph Titled	4:38
17.	"Tampa International (Remix)" (F/ Funkghost, I-Man & Phobi-One)	Celph Titled & T. The Beat Specialist	4:20
18.	"The Countdown Theory (Remix)" (F/ Walkmen)	Celph Titled & Juan Blanco / Cuts by Kramtronix	4:18
19.	"Critical Conditions (Original Mix)" (F/ Vex, Dutchmassive & Majik Most)	Celph Titled / Cuts by Kramtronix	4:52

== Additional track information ==
Disc 1
Track 2 from Megadef by Styles of Beyond
Track 3 from A Job Ain't Nuthin but Work by J-Zone
Track 4 from DC2: Bars of Death by 7L & Esoteric
Track 5 from Sin-A-Matic by Louis Logic
Track 6 from The Darkest Night Ever!!! by Black Panther
Track 8 from Sloppy Seconds Vol. 2 by CunninLynguists
Track 10 from Put Ya Dukes Up by Apathy
Track 11 from The Rising Tied by Fort Minor
Track 12 from Junk Planet by DutchMassive
Track 13 from TM Radio by Time Machine
Track 14 from Who's Fuckin' Around/Bottom Line by K-Skills
Track 15 from Rock/I´ll Be Alright If You Stay For The Night by Lexicon
Track 16 from Fahrenheit 813/Windows 98/Critical Conditions by Equilibrium
Track 17 from Fortruss/The Countdown Theory by Walkmen
Track 18 from Do That/Hold Something by Equilibrium
Disc 2
Track 1 from Champion Sounds by DJ Skully
Track 2 from DC2: Bars of Death by 7L & Esoteric
Track 4 from All Out War by Terntable Jediz
Track 5 from A Job Ain't Nuthin But Work by J-Zone
Track 6 from Molesting Hip-Hop: The Official Mixtape by Majik Most
Track 8 from We Came From Beyond, Vol. 2
