= Wretches and Kings =

Promotional single by Linkin Park

from the album A Thousand Suns
- Released: October 9, 2010
- Recorded: 2009–2010
- Genre: Rap rock; industrial hip hop
- Length: 4:15
- Label: Warner Bros.; Machine Shop.
- Composer: Linkin Park
- Lyricists: Chester Bennington; Mike Shinoda
- Producers: Mike Shinoda; Rick Rubin

"Wretches and Kings" is a song by American rock band Linkin Park. It is the tenth track from their 2010 album, A Thousand Suns. The song was written by the band and produced by co-lead vocalist Mike Shinoda and Rick Rubin. "Wretches and Kings" was used as a promotional single and was featured as a part of the "Linkin Park Track Pack" Downloadable Content for the video game Guitar Hero: Warriors of Rock. The song was also used for the backdrop for EA's opening sequence in EA Sports MMA.

== Promotion ==
"Wretches and Kings" features Mario Savio's "Bodies upon the gears" or the "Operation of the Machine" speech. The promotional single was first obtainable on the band's official website and was streamed on Noisecreep. The tempo of the song was set to 90 BPM. The song was also released for the albums like A Thousand Suns+ as the live version and It's The Bootleg, Muthafuckas! Volume 3: Fire Walk With Me as a remix.

== Personnel ==
- Chester Bennington – vocals
- Mike Shinoda – rap vocals, keyboard, sampler
- Brad Delson – electric guitar
- Dave Farrell – bass guitar, backing vocals
- Joe Hahn – turntables, samplers, backing vocals
- Rob Bourdon – drums, backing vocals
- Mario Savio – speech part ("Bodies Upon the Gears" speech)

== Remixes ==
A number of remixes have been done by various artists like HavocNdeeD as well as the Los Angeles rap group Get Busy Committee, the latter in co-production by Scoop DeVille, with their GBC remix appearing on Apathy's third It's the Bootleg, Muthafuckas! compilation installment It's the Bootleg, Muthafuckas! Vol. 3: Fire Walk With Me, which was released on September 11, 2012 under the simplified title of "Wretches [Remix]".

Remix Title	Artist	Album
Wretches and Kings Remix (Get Busy Committee remix)	Get Busy Committee, Apathy	"It's the Bootleg, Muthafuckas! Vol. 3: Fire Walk With Me"
Wretches and Kings (HavocNdeeD Remix)	HavocNdeeD	"Non album Single"
Wretches and Kings (zwieR.Z. Remix)	zwieR.Z	"Non album Single"
Wretches and Kings (Xefuzion Remix)	"Xefuzion"	"Non album Single"

== Release history ==
Region	Date	Format	Label
Worldwide	September 8, 2010	Digital download	Warner Bros.; Machine Shop.
