= Eastern Philosophy (album) =

Studio album by Apathy
- Released: March 21, 2006
- Genre: Hip-hop
- Label: Demigodz; Babygrande
- Producer: Chum the Skrilla Gorilla; Celph Titled; Quincy Tones; Apathy; DJ Cheapshot; Exact Beats; 8th & Vertygo

Apathy chronology
Where's Your Album?!! (2004)	Eastern Philosophy (2006)	Wanna Snuggle? (2009)

Eastern Philosophy is the first official album by rapper Apathy. After years of deals in limbo, Apathy was finally able to release his debut album, on Babygrande Records. "The Winter" was released as a single.

Professional ratings
Review scores
Source	Rating
HipHopDX	4.5/5
RapReviews	8.5/10

== Track listing ==
No.	Title	Producer(s)	Length
1.	"Eastern Philosophy" (Intro)	Chum the Skrilla Gorilla	1:28
2.	"1,000 Grams"	Chum the Skrilla Gorilla	3:33
3.	"All About Crime"	Celph Titled	3:33
4.	"9 to 5" (featuring Emilio Lopez)	Quincy Tones	3:57
5.	"Here Come the Gangstas"	Chum the Skrilla Gorilla	4:34
6.	"Can't Leave Rap Alone" (featuring Celph Titled and Ryu)	Chum the Skrilla Gorilla	3:24
7.	"One of Those Days"	Apathy	3:14
8.	"Me & My Friends" (featuring Celph Titled and One Two)	DJ Cheapshot; Quincy Tones	4:58
9.	"Chemical"	Chum the Skrilla Gorilla	3:39
10.	"Doe Raker Check" (featuring Motive)	Chum the Skrilla Gorilla	3:36
11.	"Philosophical Gangsta" (featuring Bad Seed and Poison Pen)	Exact Beats	3:16
12.	"I Remember..."	Chum the Skrilla Gorilla; Apathy (co.)	3:27
13.	"The Buck Stops Here"	8th & Vertygo	3:03
14.	"The Winter" (featuring Blue Raspberry)	Chum the Skrilla Gorilla	4:08

== Credits ==
=== Additional personnel ===
- Anton Pukshansky — bass (track 3, 4), guitar (track 10)
- DJ Mek — scratches (track 3)
- Vertygo — keyboards (track 4)
- DJ Evil Dee — scratches (track 13)

=== Production ===
- Chum the Skrilla Guerilla — track 1, 2, 5, 6, 9, 10, 12, 14
- Celph Titled — track 3
- Quincey Tones — track 4, 8
- Apathy — track 7, 12
- DJ Cheapshot — track 8
- Exact Beats — track 11
- 8th & Vertygo — track 13

=== Other credits ===
- Executive Producer: Apathy
- Mastering: Michael Sarsfield
- Mixing: Chum The Skrilla Guerilla
- Photography: Open Mic
- Artwork: Open Mic
