= Primate Mindstate =

EP by Apathy
- Released: August 23, 2011
- Recorded: 2010–2011
- Genre: Hip-hop
- Length: 24:30
- Label: Demigodz
- Producers: Apathy; MoSS

Apathy chronology
Make Alotta Money (2010)	Primate Mindstate (2011)	Connecticut Casual (2014)

Primate Mindstate is the second extended play by American rapper Apathy. It was released on August 23, 2011, through Demigodz Records as a Bonus disc to his third studio album, Honkey Kong. The EP is mostly produced by Apathy, though one track is produced by MoSS.

== Track listing ==
No.	Title	Producer(s)	Length
1.	"East Coast Rapist"	Apathy	3:19
2.	"Squeeze" (featuring Blacastan)	Apathy	3:24
3.	"Dear Lord" (featuring Eternia & Diabolic)	MoSS	3:26
4.	"Make Alotta Money"	Apathy	2:54
5.	"Smoke Weed Everyday" (featuring Scoop DeVille)	Apathy	3:21
6.	"No Rapper" (scratches by DJ Kwestion)	Apathy	4:29
7.	"Death to the Culture Vultures"	Apathy	4:57
Total length:			24:30

== Samples ==
- "East Coast Rapist"
- "Don't You (Forget About Me)" by Simple Minds
- "Make Alotta Money"
- "River" by Joni Mitchell
- "Smoke Weed Everybody"
- "Eyes Without a Face" by Billy Idol
- "The Next Episode" by Dr. Dre
