= Make Alotta Money =

EP by Apathy
- Released: October 8, 2010
- Recorded: 2010
- Genre: Hip-hop
- Length: 15:08
- Label: Demigodz
- Producer: Apathy

Apathy chronology
Wanna Snuggle? (2009)	Make Alotta Money (2010)	Primate Mindstate (2011)

Make Alotta Money is a mixtape by American rapper Apathy. It was the first EP he had ever released, and it was officially released on October 8, 2010. It features the song of the same name as the EP with four different versions of it, along with two different versions of "We're Gonna Kill You". The Mixtape is produced by Apathy.

== Track listing ==
No.	Title	Length
1.	"Make Alotta Money"	2:54
2.	"Make Alotta Money [Clean]"	2:54
3.	"Make Alotta Money [Instrumental]"	2:54
4.	"Make Alotta Money [Acapella]"	1:47
5.	"We're Gonna Kill You"	3:05
6.	"We're Gonna Kill You [Instrumental]"	1:34
Total length:		15:08
