= Spies Like Us (disambiguation) =

Spies Like Us is a 1985 American comedy film starring Chevy Chase and Dan Aykroyd.

Spies Like Us may also refer to:

- "Spies Like Us" (song), the film's title song, written and performed by Paul McCartney
- "Spies Like Us", a track by hip hop group Styles of Beyond, from their 1998 album 2000 Fold
- Spies Like Us, a 1995 memoir by Hugh Lunn, later adapted into a radio serial by the Australian Broadcasting Corporation
