= Honkey Kong (Apathy album) =

Studio album by Apathy
- Released: August 23, 2011
- Recorded: 2010–2011
- Studio: Deer Island; Found Sound Recording; Temple; HeadQcourterz
- Genre: Hip-hop
- Label: Dirty Version
- Producer: Apathy; Da Beatminerz; DJ Muggs; DJ Premier; DJ Wayne Ski; Evidence; Smoke The World; Statik Selektah; Stu Bangas; Teddy Roxpin; Vanderslice

Apathy chronology
Wanna Snuggle? (2009)	Honkey Kong (2011)	Connecticut Casual (2014)

Singles from Honkey kong
- 1. "Make Alotta Money" Released: 2010; 2. "Check to Check" Released: 2011; 3. "Stop What Ya Doin'" Released: August 9, 2011

Honkey Kong is the third solo studio album by American rapper Apathy. It was released on August 23, 2011, via Dirty Version Records. The album was produced by Teddy Roxpin, Vanderslice, Da Beatminerz, DJ Muggs, DJ Premier, DJ Wayne Ski, Evidence, Smoke the World, Statik Selektah, Stu Bangas, and Apathy, who also served as executive producer with Celph Titled. It features guest appearances from Blacastan, Celph Titled, Esoteric, Vinnie Paz, Action Bronson, Brevi, Ill Bill, Mad Lion, Motive, OuterSpace, Reef the Lost Cauze, Slaine, Steele, Tosha Makia, and Xzibit.

The album peaked at number 40 on the Top R&B/Hip-Hop Albums, number 45 on the Independent Albums and number 7 on the Heatseekers Albums charts in the United States.

== Promotion and release ==
In late November 2010, Apathy confirmed that he listed Vanderslice, Da Beatminerz, DJ Muggs, DJ Premier, Evidence, Stu Bangas and himself to contribute production for his upcoming 2011 album titled Honkey Kong. On June 20, 2011, Apathy expanded on his production team, adding Teddy Roxpin and Statik Selektah to the list, also revealing guest appearances from Celph Titled and Xzibit, and set the release date on August 23, 2011. On July 30, 2011, the tracklist was revealed.

The album was released simultaneously with Primate Mindstate extended play and The Instrumentals of Honkey Kong. All the seven songs from the EP and 15 instrumentals (omitting "Who Got Da Juice") were issued as bonus tracks.

== Critical reception ==
Professional ratings
Aggregate scores
Source	Rating
Metacritic	82/100
Review scores
Source	Rating
The Boston Phoenix	3.5/4 stars
HipHopDX	4/5
PopMatters	7/10
RapReviews	8.5/10
XXL	4/5

Honkey Kong was met with generally favourable reviews from music critics. At Metacritic, which assigns a normalized rating out of 100 to reviews from mainstream publications, the album received an average score of 82, based on five reviews, indicating "universal acclaim".

Chris Faraone of The Boston Phoenix praised the album, stating: "as always, Apathy wins on account of the metaphors he spatters across tracks like so much blood, sweat, and tears". Steve 'Flash' Juon of RapReviews claimed Apathy's "versatile enough in writing ability to cover any topic from somber to silly, he's clever enough to make what he has to say worth rewinding to catch, and he's not that bad behind the boards as a producer either". William Ketchum III of HipHopDX resumed: "by translating the reverence toward his idols into his own talents instead of living in the past, Apathy continues to earn his keep in a genre that he feels is losing its way". Aaron Matthews of XXL concluded: "despite a few redundant tracks and a lack of cohesion, Honkey Kong paints a good picture of the impressive output Apathy is capable of in 2011". Kevin Curtin of PopMatters summed up with "in full, Honkey Kong marries aggressive wordplay and classic beats and the results are universally good".

== Track listing ==
No.	Title	Writer(s)	Producer(s)	Length
1.	"Honkey Kong" (featuring Vinnie Paz)	Chad Bromley; Kevin Marcus Sylvester; Eric Vanderslice	Vanderslice	2:53
2.	"Holy Ghost" (featuring Slaine)	Bromley; George Carroll	Apathy	3:25
3.	"The Villain" (featuring Ill Bill)	Bromley; William Braunstein; Edgar Cruz	Apathy	4:27
4.	"Check to Check"	Bromley; Michael Perretta	Evidence; Khrysis (add.)	3:38
5.	"Stop What Ya Doin'" (featuring Celph Titled)	Bromley; Vic Mercer; Christopher E. Martin	DJ Premier	4:35
6.	"The Recipe" (featuring Xzibit)	Bromley; Alvin Joiner; Stuart Hudgins	Stu Bangas	3:47
7.	"Fear Itself"	Bromley; Lawrence Muggerud	DJ Muggs	4:02
8.	"Who Got Da Juice" (featuring Blacastan)	Ira Osu		0:44
9.	"It's Only Hip-Hop" (featuring Brevi)	Bromley; Kory Garnett; Patrick Baril	Statik Selektah	3:21
10.	"I Dedicate This to You" (featuring Tosha Makia)	Bromley; M.J. Smoker	Smoke The World	3:20
11.	"All I Think About" (featuring Action Bronson)	Bromley; Ariyan Arslani; Vanderslice	Vanderslice	4:02
12.	"Never Say Never" (featuring Steele and Mad Lion)	Bromley; Darrell Yates, Jr.; Oswald Priest; Teddy Rosenthal	Teddy Roxpin	4:29
13.	"Albino Gorillas" (featuring Esoteric)	Bromley; Seamus Ryan; Wayne A. Lee	DJ Wayne Ski	4:07
14.	"Peace Connecticut"	Bromley; Walter Dewgarde	Da Beatminerz	3:06
15.	"Army of the Godz" (featuring Esoteric, Blacastan, Reef the Lost Cauze, Planetary, Crypt the Warchild, Motive, Celph Titled and Vinnie Paz)	Bromley; Ryan; Osu; Sharif Lacey; Mario Collazo; Marcus Albaladejo; Tim Cook; Mercer; Vincenzo Luvineri; Rosenthal	Teddy Roxpin	4:43
16.	"1:52 A.M."	Bromley	Apathy	2:54

Bonus disc (Primate Mindstate EP + Honkey Kong Instrumentals)
No.	Title	Producer(s)	Length
17.	"East Coast Rapist"	Apathy	3:18
18.	"Squeeze" (featuring Blacastan)	Apathy	3:24
19.	"Dear Lord" (featuring Eternia and Diabolic)	MoSS	3:26
20.	"Make Alotta Money"	Apathy	2:53
21.	"Smoke Weed Everyday" (featuring Scoop DeVille)	Apathy	3:20
22.	"No Rapper"	Apathy	4:28
23.	"Death to the Culture Vultures"	Apathy	4:57
24.	"Honkey Kong" (Instrumental)	Vanderslice	2:46
25.	"Holy Ghost" (Instrumental)	Apathy	3:16
26.	"The Villain" (Instrumental)	Apathy	3:35
27.	"Check to Check" (Instrumental)	Evidence	3:38
28.	"Stop What Ya Doin'" (Instrumental)	DJ Premier	4:35
29.	"The Recipe" (Instrumental)	Stu Bangas	3:48
30.	"Fear Itself" (Instrumental)	DJ Muggs	3:24
31.	"It's Only Hip-Hop" (Instrumental)	Statik Selektah	3:18
32.	"I Dedicate This to You" (Instrumental)	Smoke The World	3:21
33.	"All I Think About" (Instrumental)	Vanderslice	4:02
34.	"Never Say Never" (Instrumental)	Teddy Roxpin	4:21
35.	"Albino Gorillas" (Instrumental)	DJ Wayne Ski	3:34
36.	"Peace Connecticut" (Instrumental)	Da Beatminerz	3:00
37.	"Army of the Godz" (Instrumental)	Teddy Roxpin	4:32
38.	"1:52 A.M." (Instrumental)	Apathy	2:27
Total length:			2:16:56

== Personnel ==
- Chad "Apathy" Bromley – vocals, producer (tracks: 2, 3, 16), recording, mixing, mastering, executive producer, sleeve notes
- Vincenzo "Vinnie Paz" Luviner – vocals (tracks: 1, 15)
- George "Slaine" Carroll – vocals (track 2)
- William "Ill Bill" Braunstein – vocals (track 3)
- Vic "Celph Titled" Mercer – vocals (tracks: 5, 15), executive producer
- Alvin "Xzibit" Joiner – vocals (track 6)
- Ira "Blacastan" Osu – vocals (tracks: 8, 15), additional vocals (track 7)
- Kory "Brevi" Garnett – vocals (track 9)
- Tosha Makia – vocals (track 10)
- Ariyan "Action Bronson" Arslani – vocals (track 11)
- Darrell "Steele" Yates Jr. – vocals (track 12)
- Oswald "Mad Lion" Priest – vocals (track 12)
- Seamus "Esoteric" Ryan – vocals (tracks: 13, 15)
- Sharif "Reef the Lost Cauze" Lacey – vocals (track 15)
- Mario "Planetary" Collazo – vocals (track 15)
- Marcus "Crypt the Warchild" Albaladejo – vocals (track 15)
- Tim "Motive" Cook – vocals (track 15)
- Dan "Danny Diablo" Singer – additional vocals (track 7)
- Annee Newton – additional vocals (track 7)
- Wayne A. "DJ Wayne Ski" Lee – additional vocals (track 12), producer (track 13)
- Xavier Ryan – additional vocals (track 13)
- Kevin Marcus Sylvester – strings (track 1)
- B. "Grand Finale" Miklos – bass (track 3)
- Edgar "Vertygo" Cruz – additional keyboards (track 3)
- Dave "DJ Kwestion" Klein – scratches (track 6)
- Lawrence "DJ Muggs" Muggerud – scratches & producer (track 7)
- Anthony "Tone Spliff" Mucitelli – scratches (tracks: 10, 16)
- Ewart "DJ Evil Dee" Dewgarde – scratches (track 14)
- Eric Vanderslice – producer (tracks: 1, 11)
- Michael "Evidence" Perretta – producer (track 4)
- Christopher "DJ Premier" Martin – producer (track 5)
- Stuart "Stu Bangas" Hudgins – producer (track 6)
- Patrick "Statik Selektah" Baril – producer (track 9)
- E. Michael "Smoke The World" Montavon – producer (track 10)
- Teddy "Roxpin" Rosenthal – producer (tracks: 12, 15)
- Walter "Mr. Walt" Dewgarde – producer (track 14)
- Christopher "Khrysis" Tyson – additional producer (track 4)
- Jay Turner – recording (track 6)
- Scott "Supe" Stallone – recording (tracks: 10, 15)
- Tracy Weiss – photography
- Mike LaRose – graphic design
- Billy "Bonks" Bianco – illustration

== Charts ==
Chart (2011)	Peak position
US Top R&B/Hip-Hop Albums (Billboard)	40
US Independent Albums (Billboard)	45
US Heatseekers Albums (Billboard)	7
