= The Raid: Redemption (soundtrack) =

Soundtrack album by Mike Shinoda and Joseph Trapanese
- Released: January 20, 2012
- Recorded: 2011–2012
- Genre: Ambient, electronic music
- Length: 74:48
- Label: Madison Gate
- Producer: Mike Shinoda, Ario Sagantoro

Mike Shinoda solo chronology
| MTV VMA Score 2005 (2005) | The Raid: Redemption (2012) | Medal of Honor: Warfighter (2012) |

Professional ratings
Review scores
| Source | Rating |
|---|---|
| AllMusic | 4/5 stars |

The Raid: Redemption is a soundtrack/score album composed by Joseph Trapanese and Linkin Park's co-vocalist Mike Shinoda, who also serves as producer for the album, which was originally inspired from the 2012 live-action film The Raid: Redemption.

The album contains two songs performed by other artists, "Razors Out" by Chino Moreno and "Suicide Music" by Get Busy Committee.

== Background ==
While the film was still in production, in May 2011, Sony Pictures Worldwide Acquisitions acquired the distribution rights of the film for the U.S. and tasked Mike Shinoda of Linkin Park and Joseph Trapanese to create a new score for U.S. market. The film premiered at the 2011 Toronto International Film Festival with the original score from the Indonesian version which was composed by Aria Prayogi and Fajar Yuskemal, who also composed Evans's previous film, Merantau. The Raid made its debut in the U.S. with Trapanese and Shinoda's version at Sundance 2012.

On his blog, Shinoda stated that his score was over 50 minutes and almost all instrumental. After film production, he had room for two more songs, but did not want to sing or rap, so he posted pictures of two music artists. Deftones/††† frontman Chino Moreno guest performed "Razors Out". Rap group Get Busy Committee performed "Suicide Music".

== Track listing ==
All tracks are written by Mike Shinoda and Joseph Trapanese, except where noted.

| No. | Title | Writer(s) | Length |
|---|---|---|---|
| 1. | "Prayers" | | 1:44 |
| 2. | "Gear Up" | | 3:58 |
| 3. | "The Arrival" | | 1:55 |
| 4. | "We Have Company" | | 4:51 |
| 5. | "We're Alone Here" | | 1:45 |
| 6. | "Quaking Old Fuck" | | 0:47 |
| 7. | "Hole Drop" | | 4:22 |
| 8. | "Moving Up, Part 1" | | 6:19 |
| 9. | "Moving Up, Part 2" | | 3:09 |
| 10. | "Trapped" | | 2:27 |
| 11. | "Close Shave" | | 2:32 |
| 12. | "One Way Out" | | 1:49 |
| 13. | "Machete Standoff" | | 4:37 |
| 14. | "Rama's Family Dream" | | 1:15 |
| 15. | "Chair Slam" | | 1:17 |
| 16. | "Dirty Cop" | | 1:02 |
| 17. | "Jaka Caught" | | 0:32 |
| 18. | "Dog Fight" | | 2:56 |
| 19. | "Uncle Andi" | | 2:28 |
| 20. | "Dead Already" | | 1:01 |
| 21. | "Drug Lab" | | 3:45 |
| 22. | "Andi Strung Up" | | 2:34 |
| 23. | "Putting a Mad Dog Down" | | 7:05 |
| 24. | "Misfire" | | 2:20 |
| 25. | "Razors Out" (Performed by Chino Moreno, stylized as "RAZORS.OUT") | Mike Shinoda, Chino Moreno | 4:34 |
| 26. | "Suicide Music" (Performed by Get Busy Committee, stylized as "SUICIDE MUSIC") | Mike Shinoda, Chad Bromley, Ryan Maginn, Elijiah Molina | 3:44 |
