= Killmatic =

KILLmatic

Studio album by Demigodz
- Released: March 5, 2013
- Recorded: 2011−2013
- Studio: HeadQcourterz Studios LTD. (New York, NY)
- Genre: Hip hop
- Length: 56:05
- Label: Dirty Version Records
- Producer: Apathy; Chumzilla; DJ Premier; Marco Polo; Skammadix; Snowgoons; Teddy Roxpin; Will C.

Demigodz chronology
| The Godz Must Be Crazier (2007) | KILLmatic (2013) |

Singles from KILLmatic
- 1. "Demigodz Is Back" Released: November 23, 2011; 2. "Dead in the Middle" Released: February 5, 2013; 3. "Worst Nightmare" Released: March 5, 2013; 4. "Raiders Cap" Released: May 13, 2013

Professional ratings
Review scores
| Source | Rating |
|---|---|
| HipHopDX | 3.5/5 |
| RapReviews | 9/10 |

KILLmatic is the second studio album by American hip hop collective Demigodz. It was released on March 5, 2013, via Dirty Version Records. Recording sessions took place at HeadQcourterz Studios in New York. Production was handled by Teddy Roxpin, Chumzilla, DJ Premier, Marco Polo, Skammadix, Snowgoons, Will C., and Apathy, who also served as executive producer together with Celph Titled and Open Mic. It features guest appearances from Eternia, Panch, Planetary, R.A. the Rugged Man, Scoop DeVille and Termanology.

== Pre-release ==
On November 23, 2011, Celph Titled from Demigodz shared the first single, "Demigodz Is Back" from the Demigodz album entitled as Killmatic on Facebook. The official video of the song was later released on January 18, 2013. The second single was released on February 5, 2013, called "Dead in the Middle". On February 7, 2013, released date, artwork and tracklist were revealed. The third single called "Worst Nightmare" was released on the same day as the album, March 5, 2013.

== Post-release ==
The album debuted at No. 11 on the US Billboard Heatseekers Albums chart. The fourth and final single, "Raiders Cap", was released on May 13, 2013.

== Description ==
"Demigodz is for true, hardcore hip-hop fans", Apathy said. "This Killmatic album was made to reflect that. We always try to keep it grimy, dirty, creepy, spooky and fucked up".

== Reception ==
Killmatic received critical acclaim from music critics. Jake Paine of HipHopDX gave the album a 3.5 out of 5 saying "If the title was any indication, Killmatic merges two things—seedy subject matter and Golden-Era style. References to David Berkowitz, porn runaways, dirty apartments and more litter this album" and "The other Godz are role-players within an album that doesn’t focus on concept nearly as much as style. To some, this is Everyman music from artists with the antithesis of Everyman abilities".

D.T. Swinga of HipHopSite gave the album a 4 out of 5 saying "The who-gives-a-fuck mentality of Killmatic comes through in both its brazen lyrical content and its flagrant sample selection. The lyrical content is a contest of jabs, designed to shock the listener and instigate friendly competition within the crew". And that "As hip-hop music continues to deteriorate into something only used to sell bottles (whether it be champagne or soda), it’s nice to see a crew of dudes like Demigodz still holding it down after a decade plus in the game, especially when many of the cats that came up in their era have more or less hung up their mics".

== Track listing ==
| No. | Title | Producer(s) | Length |
|---|---|---|---|
| 1. | "Intro (Giants On the Earth)" | Apathy | 0:47 |
| 2. | "Demigodz is Back" | Apathy | 3:06 |
| 3. | "Dumb High" (featuring Open Mic) | Apathy | 3:57 |
| 4. | "Never Take Me Out" (featuring Termanology) | Teddy Roxpin | 3:51 |
| 5. | "Just Can't Quit" (featuring Scoop DeVille) | Apathy | 3:40 |
| 6. | "Worst Nightmare" | DJ Premier | 3:35 |
| 7. | "Can't Fool Me" (featuring Eternia) | Apathy | 3:51 |
| 8. | "DGZ x NYGz" (featuring Panchi) | Chumzilla | 3:32 |
| 9. | "Dead in the Middle" | Apathy | 3:17 |
| 10. | "The Gospel According To..." (featuring Planetary) | Skammadix | 4:43 |
| 11. | "Raiders Cap" | Apathy | 3:19 |
| 12. | "The Fallen Angels" | Apathy | 3:22 |
| 13. | "The Summer of Sam" | Snowgoons | 3:15 |
| 14. | "Tomax & Xamot" | Will C. | 2:59 |
| 15. | "Captain Caveman" (featuring R.A. the Rugged Man) | Teddy Roxpin | 4:02 |
| 16. | "Audi 5000" | Marco Polo | 4:49 |
| Total length: | | | 56:05 |

== Personnel ==
- Chad "Apathy" Bromley – vocals (tracks: 2–9, 11–16), producer (tracks: 1–3, 5, 7, 9, 11, 12), recording (tracks: 1–7, 9–16), mixing, executive producer
- Victor "Celph Titled" Mercer – vocals (tracks: 2–13, 15, 16), executive producer
- Tim "Motive" Cook – vocals (tracks: 3, 5–7, 10–13, 16)
- Ryan "Ryu" Maginn – vocals (tracks: 2, 5, 6, 9, 11, 13, 16)
- Seamus "Esoteric" Ryan – vocals (tracks: 3, 6, 7, 10, 13, 14, 16)
- Ira "Blacastan" Osu – vocals (track 5–8, 13, 16), additional vocals (track 10)
- Mike "Open Mic" LaRose – vocals (track 3), executive producer, graphic design
- Daniel "Termanology" Carrillo – vocals (track 4)
- Elijah "Scoop DeVille" Molina – vocals (track 5)
- Silk "Eternia" Kaya – vocals (track 7)
- Andre "Panchi" Davis – vocals (track 8)
- Mario "Planetary" Collazo – vocals (track 10)
- Richard Andrew "R.A. the Rugged Man" Thorburn – vocals (track 15)
- Adrienne Law – skit vocals
- Christopher "DJ Premier" Martin – additional vocals & recording (track 8), producer & scratches (track 6)
- Anthony "Tone Spliff" Mucitelli – scratches (track 7)
- Luke Campbell – guitar (track 8)
- Adam "Chumzilla" Mathiason – scratches (tracks: 12, 14, 16), producer (track 8)
- Teddy "Roxpin" Rosenthal – producer (tracks: 4, 15)
- Kris "Skammadix" Rey – producer (track 10)
- Snowgoons – producers (track 13)
- Will Curley – producer (track 14)
- Marco Bruno – producer (track 16)
- Chris B. Murray – cover illustration

== Charts ==
| Chart (2013) | Peak position |
|---|---|
| US Heatseekers Albums (Billboard) | 11 |
| US Top R&B/Hip-Hop Albums (Billboard) | 39 |
