= Uzi Does It =

Studio album by Get Busy Committee
- Released: October 27, 2009
- Recorded: 2008–2009
- Genre: Hip-hop
- Length: 48:06
- Label: Tokyo Sex Whale Records
- Producer: Apathy; Scoop DeVille

Singles from Uzi Does It
- 1. "Chillin Out Maxin"; 2. "My Little Razorblade"

Uzi Does It is the debut album from Get Busy Committee, which was released on October 27, 2009 through Tokyo Sex Whale Records. It consists of vocals and production by Ryu and Apathy of Demigodz, and Scoop DeVille.

== Release model ==
The album was released in several different formats, including:

- Half of the album for free, if fans e-mailed, Tweeted, or posted a link on Facebook to promote the album
- Traditional CD
- Traditional digital download, in MP3, FLAC, and Apple Lossless
- Digitally, via being housed in a limited edition Uzi-shaped 2GB USB stick

For an additional charge, purchasers could also receive a limited edition Uzi Does It T-shirt, custom made by TrueLove&FalseIdols clothing. There was also an extremely limited-edition version made available exclusively at Suru L.A., which is currently owned by Linkin Park turntablist Joe Hahn.

On February 13, 2010, GBC released an official music video for "I Don't Care About You" via their YouTube channel.

== Track listing ==
All tracks are written by Ryan "Ryu" Maginn, Apathy, and Scoop DeVille.

No.	Title	Length
1.	"My Little Razorblade"	3:33
2.	"Runnin' Outta Dough" (featuring Tashina Suzuki)	2:56
3.	"Stylish Clothes"	3:05
4.	"Shoot Me Up"	3:10
5.	"I Don't Care About You"	3:56
6.	"Chillin Out Maxin"	3:07
7.	"Uzi Does It" (featuring Chevy Jones)	3:46
8.	"Say Whaaat"	4:19
9.	"Looks Like Magic"	2:47
10.	"No Time to Speak"	3:51
11.	"Hurting Me So Much"	2:38
12.	"Diamonds in Your Eyes"	3:43
13.	"Baby Mama"	3:38
14.	"Come Talk to Me"	3:44

== Samples ==
- "My Little Razorblade" samples "Heartbeats (song)" by The Knife.
