= The Widow's Son (album) =

Studio album by Apathy
- Released: March 2, 2018
- Recorded: 2017–2018
- Genre: Hip-hop
- Length: 50:29
- Label: Dirty Version Records
- Producer: Apathy; Buckwild; Chumzilla; DJ Premier; Messiah Musik; Nottz; Pete Rock; Smoke The World; Stu Bangas

Apathy chronology
Handshakes with Snakes (2016)	The Widow's Son (2018)	Where the River Meets the Sea (2019)

Professional ratings
Review scores
Source	Rating
Albumism	3.5/5 stars
RapReviews	8.5/10

The Widow's Son is the solo sixth studio album by American hip-hop recording artist Apathy. It was released on March 2, 2018, through Dirty Version Records. Production was handled by Stu Bangas, Buckwild, Chumzilla, DJ Premier, Messiah Musik, Nottz, Pete Rock, Smoke The World, and Apathy himself, who also served as executive producer together with Celph Titled and Craig Skauge. It features guest appearances from A.G., Brevi, Celph Titled, Diabolic, Locksmith, M.O.P., Pete Rock, Pharoahe Monch and Ryu. The album debuted at number 15 on the Heatseekers Albums chart in the United States.

The 28-track Instrumentals + Acapellas version of the album with black-and-white version of original cover art was released on the same day.

== Track listing ==
No.	Title	Producer(s)	Length
1.	"The Spellbook"	Apathy	3:42
2.	"Chaos"	Stu Bangas	2:36
3.	"Never Fall Off" (featuring A.G.)	Apathy	3:33
4.	"The Widow's Son" (featuring Ryu)	Chumzilla	3:41
5.	"The Order"	DJ Premier	3:44
6.	"Alien Weaponry"	Nottz	3:44
7.	"Hypnosis" (featuring Brevi)	Messiah Musik	4:04
8.	"I Keep On" (featuring Pharoahe Monch and Pete Rock)	Pete Rock	3:30
9.	"View of Hell (Hell of a View)"	Buckwild	3:38
10.	"Fist of the North Star" (featuring Diabolic)	Stu Bangas	3:46
11.	"Stomp Rappers" (featuring Celph Titled and M.O.P.)	Apathy	3:48
12.	"Legend of the 3rd Degree"	Stu Bangas	3:59
13.	"Rise and Shine" (featuring Locksmith)	Apathy	2:47
14.	"Obi Wan"	Smoke The World	3:57
Total length:			50:29

Notes

- Tracks 2 and 11 stylized in all caps.

== Personnel ==
- Chad "Apathy" Bromley – vocals, producer (tracks: 1, 3, 11, 13), recording, mixing (tracks: 1–4, 6–14), mastering, executive producer
- Andre "A.G." Barnes – vocals (track 3)
- Ryan Patrick "Ryu" Maginn – vocals (track 4)
- Kory "Brevi" Garnett – vocals (track 7)
- Troy "Pharoahe Monch" Jamerson – vocals (track 8)
- Peter "Pete Rock" Phillips – vocals & producer (track 8)
- Sean "Diabolic" George – vocals (track 10)
- Vic "Celph Titled" Mercer – vocals (track 11), executive producer
- Eric "Billy Danze" Murray – vocals (track 11)
- Jamal "Lil' Fame" Grinnage – vocals (track 11)
- Davood "Locksmith" Asgari – vocals (track 13)
- Matthew "DJ Mekalek" Katz – scratches (tracks: 3, 13)
- Adam "Chumzilla" Mathiason – scratches (tracks: 4, 11), producer (track 4)
- Christopher "DJ Premier" Martin – scratches, producer & mixing (track 5)
- Edgar "Vertygo" Cruz – keyboards (track 7)
- DJ Eloheem – scratches (tracks: 9, 10)
- Anthony "Tone Spliff" Mucitelli – scratches (track 12)
- Stuart "Stu Bangas" Hudgins – producer (tracks: 2, 10, 12)
- Dominick "Nottz" Lamb – producer (track 6)
- Pete "Messiah Musik" Lawrence – producer (track 7)
- Anthony "Buckwild" Best – producer (track 9)
- E. Michael "Smoke The World" Montavon – producer (track 14)
- Craig Skauge – executive producer
- Michael Peery – cover art
- Andrew Henderson – photography
- Joshua Jordan – photography
- Open Mic – graphics

== Charts ==
Chart (2018)	Peak position
US Heatseekers Albums (Billboard)	15
