= It's the Bootleg, Muthafuckas! =

Series of compilation albums by Apathy

It's the Bootleg, Muthafuckas! are a series of compilation albums released by Apathy.

== It's the Bootleg, Muthafuckas! Volume 1 ==
It's the Bootleg, Muthafuckas!

Compilation album by Apathy
- Released: 2003
- Genre: Hip-hop
- Length: 75:35 (CD 1); 79:01 (CD 2)
- Label: Demigodz

Apathy chronology
It's the Bootleg, Muthafuckas! (2003)	Hell's Lost and Found (2007)

It's the Bootleg, Muthafuckas! Volume 1 was released in 2003.

=== CD 1 ===
No.	Title	Length
1.	"Y'all Ain't Good Enough" (featuring Celph Titled)	4:03
2.	"Every Emcee" (featuring Rise)	4:04
3.	"DSL's"	3:01
4.	"That ol' Boom Bap" (Remix)	3:29
5.	"Chrome Depot Freestyle" (Shug Mix) (featuring Celph Titled)	2:16
6.	"Immortal"	3:43
7.	"Science of the Bumrush" (featuring Celph Titled & Open Mic)	4:18
8.	"Earth Girls Are Easy"	4:11
9.	"Eddie Ill & DL - Freestyle" (featuring Rise, Gaston, Wiseguy, Wordsworth & Punchline)	6:24
10.	"Compatible" (featuring Celph Titled)	4:19
11.	"Sureshot Affair" (featuring Open Mic)	3:28
12.	"PF Cuttin Freestyle"	1:05
13.	"Mother Molesters" (featuring Majik Most, Louis Logic & Celph Titled)	3:53
14.	"You Can Try" (featuring Esoteric)	3:08
15.	"DJ Unknown & Mekalek - Rockafella Freestyle" (featuring Rise)	3:17
16.	"Import Tuner X-Clusive" (featuring Celph Titled & Lexicon)	1:42
17.	"Public Execution" (Demigodz Mix) (featuring Celph Titled & Esoteric)	3:42
18.	"We Get Down"	3:39
19.	"Breeze Block - Radio 1 UK Freestyle" (featuring Celph Titled)	1:47
20.	"Live @ the Playboy Mansion" (featuring Open Mic)	4:30
21.	"DJ Unknown & Mekalek - Rare Species Freestyle" (featuring Celph Titled & Grafh)	3:12
22.	"Battle Me"	3:14
23.	"DJ Next - A Vibe Called Next Freestyle" (featuring Open Mic)	2:30
Total length:		75:35

=== CD 2 ===
No.	Title	Length
1.	"Don't Talk to Me" (featuring Majik Most)	3:56
2.	"Just Begun"	3:15
3.	"That ol' Boom Bap" (Original Mix)	3:46
4.	"Well, Well, Well" (featuring Celph Titled, Rise & Esoteric)	4:03
5.	"Ain't Nuthin' Nice"	3:57
6.	"Makin' Music" (Remix) (featuring Celph Titled & Lexicon)	3:30
7.	"Trife-A-Saurus Rex"	3:27
8.	"Root Beers in Your Fridge" (featuring Celph Titled)	4:29
9.	"DJ Next - Nextclusive Barbeque Sauce Freestyle" (featuring Romen Rok & Alius)	2:46
10.	"School"	4:04
11.	"The Hook" (featuring Majik Most, C-Rayz Walz, Celph Titled, Louis Logic & Dutchmassive)	4:18
12.	"DJ Unknown & Mekalek - Brothers on the Slide Freestyle" (featuring Rise)	2:59
13.	"Speak Now" (featuring Vinnie Paz of Jedi Mind Tricks & Esoteric)	4:03
14.	"No Joke" (featuring Celph Titled)	4:09
15.	"Paper Mache" (featuring Maylay Sparks, Louis Logic & Celph Titled)	3:51
16.	"Hip Hop Groupies" (featuring Open Mic)	3:40
17.	"The Smackdown" (featuring Rise, Celph Titled & C-Rayz Walz)	3:55
18.	"Eddie Ill & DL - A Long Rhyme Coming Exclusive" (featuring Celph Titled & Louis Logic)	3:05
19.	"The Big Hurt" (featuring Punchline, Wordsworth, Al Skills, Wiseguy & Gaston)	4:40
20.	"Chrome Depot Freestyle" (Blade Mix) (featuring Celph Titled)	2:19
21.	"Get Off My Nuts" (featuring Celph Titled)	2:16
22.	"DJ Unknown & Mekalek - Lost Freestyle" (featuring Louis Logic)	2:33
Total length:		79:01

== Hell's Lost and Found: It's the Bootleg, Muthafuckas! Volume 2 ==
Hell's Lost and Found

Compilation album by Apathy
- Released: 2007
- Genre: Hip-hop
- Length: 54:37 (CD 1); 61:42 (CD 2)
- Label: Demigodz

Apathy chronology
Volume 1 (2003)	Hell's Lost and Found (2007)	Fire Walk with Me (2012)

Hell's Lost and Found: It's the Bootleg, Muthafuckas! Volume 2 was released on November 27, 2007. It had a 2 disc special both contained 19 tracks each. The track Drive it Like I Stole It was also featured on the Midnight Club 3: DUB edition Soundtrack. The track "Bloc Party" is also featured on the Fort Minor: We Major mixtape by Fort Minor, the side-project of Mike Shinoda from Linkin Park, released on October 30, 2005, and as a Limited Edition in 2006.

=== CD 1 ===
No.	Title	Length
1.	"CT Shit"	2:57
2.	"Drive It Like I Stole It"	2:11
3.	"Put Ya Dukes Up"	4:12
4.	"Live at the BBQ" (featuring Motive, Styles of Beyond & Celph Titled)	3:01
5.	"Grow Up"	3:25
6.	"Power" (featuring Evil & 8TH)	3:15
7.	"Nobody's Hero"	3:17
8.	"Stronghold Freestyle"	2:02
9.	"Hell No" (featuring 8TH)	3:22
10.	"Bloc Party" (featuring Mike Shinoda & Tak)	2:31
11.	"Hard Work"	2:33
12.	"Chicka Chicka"	3:54
13.	"Own the World" (featuring Emirc)	3:26
14.	"Have a Good Time"	3:44
15.	"Gotcha" (featuring CMK)	3:39
16.	"When the Cops Come Thru" (featuring Frankie Riptide)	3:06
17.	"Winter" (Teddy Roxpin Remix) (featuring Blue Raspberry)	2:31
18.	"Foreign Affair" (featuring Emilio Lopez)	3:55
19.	"Weird Story"	0:56
Total length:		54:37

=== CD 2 ===
No.	Title	Length
1.	"Godz in da Front" (featuring Styles of Beyond, Motive, Esoteric & Celph Titled)	4:50
2.	"Cyrus the Great 50 MC's Freestyle"	1:11
3.	"Apathetic"	3:34
4.	"A.O.T.P."	1:54
5.	"Go Ahead"	3:07
6.	"Feelin' U"	4:11
7.	"Observe the Sound" (featuring J-Live, Esoteric & L the Headtoucha)	3:19
8.	"This Wun"	3:02
9.	"The Blues"	3:47
10.	"We Represent"	3:34
11.	"Everyday"	2:27
12.	"Know What You Want"	4:01
13.	"NightLife" (12inch Mix)	3:50
14.	"Only Feeling You"	4:30
15.	"Let Me Breathe"	2:40
16.	"Bring It Back" (featuring Celph Titled, Motive & Styles of Beyond)	3:14
17.	"Spanish Guitar" (featuring One Two)	3:45
18.	"Compatible" (Reformatted Remix) (featuring Celph Titled)	4:15
19.	"860 to 203"	3:51
Total length:		61:42

== Fire Walk with Me: It's the Bootleg, Muthafuckas! Volume 3 ==
Fire Walk With Me

Compilation album by Apathy
- Released: 2012
- Genre: Hip-hop
- Length: 46:26 (CD 1); 47:38 (CD 2)
- Label: Demigodz

Apathy chronology
Hell's Lost and Found (2007)	Fire Walk With Me (2012)	The Black Lodge (2015)

It's the Bootleg, Muthafuckas! Volume 3: Fire Walk with Me was released on September 11, 2012, It was released along with The Alien Tongue.

=== CD 1 ===
No.	Title	Length
1.	"Most Murderous Music"	4:00
2.	"Regeneration" (Remix) (featuring Nas)	2:14
3.	"Swagger Like Ap"	3:08
4.	"Love Locked Freestyle"	3:31
5.	"Jockin' A.P."	3:01
6.	"Times Up Freestyle"	1:41
7.	"Zombies" (featuring Blacastan)	3:22
8.	"Water to Wine" (featuring King Syze & Chris Webby)	3:57
9.	"Really Real People"	0:55
10.	"You Must Be Karma" (featuring Blacastan)	2:41
11.	"Santogold Freestyle"	2:13
12.	"And Now" (featuring Vinnie Paz & King Syze)	4:08
13.	"Back on the Scene Freestyle"	0:56
14.	"My Life" (featuring Optimus Prime)	3:33
15.	"Protek Yo Nutz" (featuring Milez Grimez)	4:04
16.	"O'Doyle Rules" (featuring Diabolic, Paradime, Joe Scudda, Rob Kelly, Ryu & Mac Lethal)	2:37
17.	"We're Gonna Kill You"	3:05
Total length:		46:26

=== CD 2 ===
No.	Title	Length
1.	"If You Forgot My Name" (featuring Royce Da 5'9")	2:30
2.	"Liquid Swords Tribute Pt. 1"	1:55
3.	"Monster" (featuring Chris Webby))	4:39
4.	"Speak the Truth"	2:17
5.	"Tell Me" (featuring Motive & Celph Titled)	3:17
6.	"Deeper Cover Freestyle"	1:52
7.	"Messin With Ya Mind Freestyle"	1:50
8.	"If I Died Today" (featuring B-Real & Young De)	3:23
9.	"Word to the 23rd Freestyle"	2:45
10.	"Dancin' on Ya Grave" (Remix) (featuring Xzibit, Paul Wall, Ryu, Murs & Scoop Deville)	4:31
11.	"Conquer, Kill Shit" (feat. Savage Souls)	4:20
12.	"Wretches" (Remix) (featuring Linkin Park, Styles of Beyond, Scoop DeVille & Divine Styler)	4:12
13.	"Stop Look & Listen Freestyle"	1:38
14.	"Wonderful X-Mas Time"	4:56
15.	"I'm Goin to Hell"	2:24
16.	"You Look Like You Come from the 80's"	1:27
17.	"Be a Better Man" (featuring Bishop Lamont & Blue Raspberry)	3:02
Total length:		47:38

== The Black Lodge: It's the Bootleg, Muthafuckas! Volume 4 ==
The Black Lodge

Compilation album by Apathy
- Released: June 30, 2015
- Genre: Hip-hop
- Label: Dirty Version

Apathy chronology
Fire Walk with Me (2012)	The Black Lodge (2015)

It's the Bootleg, Muthafuckas! Volume 4: The Black Lodge was released on June 30, 2015 along with Apathy's new EP, Weekend at the Cape.

=== CD 1 ===
No.	Title	Length
1.	"The Black Lodge" (featuring Suave-Ski)	2:51
2.	"Shoot 'Em Up" (featuring Motive)	1:21
3.	"Treated So Bad" (featuring Slaine)	2:40
4.	"The Dragon" (featuring Blacastan)	1:45
5.	"Welcome To Assholeville Pt. 2"	2:17
6.	"Wolves" (featuring Meta P, Swann Notty)	4:14
7.	"Tread Lightly" (featuring Chris Webby)	3:10
8.	"Half Dead" (featuring Planet Asia, Roc Marciano)	4:55
9.	"The Key" (featuring Filth The Enabler)	2:29
10.	"Louie Ain't Dead Yet"	2:46
11.	"Gotta be The Shoes" (featuring Ape, Undu Kati)	3:44
12.	"The Danger" (featuring Celph Titled, Esoteric, Vinnie Paz)	4:02
13.	"Sleep Walkin'" (featuring Spin 4th)	2:35
14.	"Gentlemen Needs" (featuring The Camp)	3:59
15.	"Fat Kids" (featuring Blacastan, Merkules)	3:44
16.	"Where The Wild Thingz R" (featuring Bishop Lamont)	2:45
17.	"Plan B" (featuring Illus)	3:30
18.	"Whole Wide World (Remix)" (featuring The Doppelgangaz)	3:40
19.	"Norman Bates" (featuring Coal, Diabolic, Locksmith, Nino Bless, Taboo)	5:27
20.	"Black Snow 2" (featuring Celph Titled, Ill Bill, Sicknature)	3:55
21.	"Barbarian" (featuring Eddie Brock, Big Twins)	3:59
22.	"I Gotcha Back" (featuring Franc Grams)	5:04
23.	"When You Need Me" (featuring Planetary, Vinnie Paz)	3:40
24.	"Effortlessly" (featuring Anti Citiz3ns, Ras Kass)	3:34
Total length:		79:18
