= Megadef =

Studio album by Styles of Beyond
- Released: September 9, 2003
- Recorded: 2001–2003
- Genres: Underground hip-hop; alternative hip-hop; rap rock
- Length: 45:29
- Label: SpyTech Records
- Producers: DJ Cheapshot; Vin Skully

Styles of Beyond chronology
2000 Fold (1998)	Megadef (2003)	Razor Tag (2007)

Singles from Megadef
- 1. "Subculture" Released: March 1, 2003; 2. "Pay Me" Released: November 1, 2003; 3. "Megadef"; 4. "Mr. Brown"; 5. "Be Your Dog"; 6. "Bleach"

Megadef is the second album by Los Angeles underground rap group Styles of Beyond, which was released on Spytech Records on September 9, 2003, after their 1998 installment 2000 Fold. The album's title is a reference to the Hebrew term megadef (מגדף) - which refers to the violation of Jewish law committed by cursing the sacred name of God - and a portmanteau of the name of the band Megadeth with those of bands/labels/artists such as Def Leppard, Mos Def, and Def Jam Records. Megadef was released only in an "explicit version" and was available as a download via iTunes and Amazon. The album was produced by the group members DJ Cheapshot and Vin Skully.

== Background and composition ==
Megadef was a comeback album for S.O.B., after five years after their debut album 2000 Fold. The album was mainly self managed, and included only three featuring artists. They were 4-Zone, Apathy and Celph Titled. Mike Shinoda and Divine Styler, who proved to be the backbone of their debut album, were not present for this installment. But they again joined in the process for their next installment, Razor Tag. Shinoda could not join for production (even though he did the artwork for this album), due to the work with American rock band Linkin Park for their block-buster hit album Hybrid Theory on October 24, 2000, and later, Meteora which was released parallel with this album. The reason for Divine Styler not being included in this album is not yet known. Unlike 2000 Fold, Megadef does not include samples of songs by other artists. It includes original composition by the group. The sixth and final single from the album, "Bleach", was also included in the first mixtape We Major by Shinoda's side project Fort Minor, as a Jimi remix.

== Singles ==
The album spawned out with six singles, out of which only their second single "Pay Me" from the album was officially released on November 1, 2003. A re-released single, "Subculture", was leaked on March 1, 2003, through Blackberry Records as their first single from the album. The other singles were only given to fans of the group.

== Reception ==
=== Critical reception ===
Professional ratings
Review scores
Source	Rating
Sputnikmusic	3.5/5 stars
RapReviews	(8/10)
HipHopDX	4/5 stars

The album was hugely compared with their first installment. In the review by Julien Loeper the album is given a positive review saying, "The album has its fair share of problems. As mentioned before, not all of the beats are great and while they are different in sound, they never really experiment past beyond their basic grooves. There is decent rapping on here too, but this reeks of the other guy overshadowing the other. They need to balance out the rapping more. On a plus note, the guest spots from 4-Zone, Apathy and Celph Titled are awesome and are really worth hearing. A decent album in and of itself, but it needs major improvement."

In a review by Steve 'Flash' Juon the album is explained as, Hailed as an underground classic, "2000 Fold" took us to styles beyond average hip-hop, no pun intended. Ryu and Takbir crafted refreshingly different raps: "Easy Back it Up," "Spies Like Us" and "Winnetka Exit" just to name a few. The duo seemed to delight in challenging the conventions of rap with every word, by turns imagining themselves as fly secret agents that could out bomb James Bond then in the next breath having to beg for a dollar for gas. Their wit was matched only by their beats, clearly making their LP one of 1999's most creative and innovative releases. The album is still as relevant today if not more so.

== Track listing ==
Megadef
No.	Title	Length
1.	"Intro"	1:07
2.	"Megadef"	2:31
3.	"Mr. Brown"	3:33
4.	"You Lose"	3:17
5.	"Interlude"	0:12
6.	"Be Your Dog"	3:37
7.	"Pay Me" (featuring 4-Zone)	4:33
8.	"Outta Control"	4:06
9.	"Bleach"	3:11
10.	"Playing with Fire" (featuring Apathy & Celph Titled)	3:49
11.	"Live Enough" (Remix)	3:27
12.	"Round 'em Up"	4:01
13.	"Eurobiks"	2:56
14.	"Superstars" (contains the hidden track: "Gigantor")	7:09
Total length:		42:29

Limited Edition
No.	Title	Length
15.	"Subculture" (Dieselboy + Kaos VIP)	3:31

- The Limited Edition was nowhere available to download. It includes a single which was released in 2002 as a single and re-released for the limited edition.

== Credits ==
Production

- 2-Tone - art direction, producer
- Mike Shinoda - artwork
- Coax - art direction
- DJ Cheapshot & Matt Theriault - executive producer
- Flavor Crystals - producer
- James Morris - bass guitars
- Ryu - producer
- Vin Skully - engineer, mixing
- Vice - scratching
