= Handshakes with Snakes =

Handshakes With Snakes

Studio album by Apathy
- Released: June 10, 2016
- Recorded: 2015–2016
- Genre: Hip-hop
- Length: 42:20
- Label: Dirty Version Records
- Producer: Apathy

Apathy chronology
Connecticut Casual (2014)	Handshakes With Snakes (2016)	The Widow's Son (2018)

Professional ratings
Review scores
Source	Rating
HipHopDX	4.3/5
RapReviews	8/10
The Needle Drop	7/10

Handshakes With Snakes is the fifth solo studio album by American hip-hop recording artist Apathy. It was released on June 10, 2016 through Dirty Version Records. Production, arrangement, sequencing, mixing and mastering duties were handled entirely by Apathy himself at The Danger Room in New London, Connecticut. It features guest appearances from O.C., Blacastan, B-Real, Bun B, Celph Titled, Kappa Gamma, Mariagrazia, Marvalyss, Nutso, Oh No, Pumpkinhead, Ras Kass, Sick Jacken, Spit Gemz and Twista.

The album did not reach the Billboard 200, however, it debuted at No. 36 on the Top R&B/Hip-Hop Albums, No. 22 on the Top Rap Albums, No. 49 on the Independent Albums and No. 16 on the Heatseekers Albums charts in the United States.

The Instrumentals + Acapellas version of the album, composed of 24 tracks (omitting intro), was released on the same day.

== Track listing ==
No.	Title	Length
1.	"Intro: An Army With Me..."	0:24
2.	"Pay Your Dues"	3:38
3.	"Amon RAW" (featuring Celph Titled and Pumpkinhead)	3:34
4.	"Rap Is Not Pop"	3:21
5.	"Don't Touch That Dial" (featuring Ras Kass and O.C.)	4:13
6.	"Charlie Brown" (featuring Oh No and Kappa Gamma)	3:57
7.	"Blow Ya Head Off" (featuring Marvalyss and Blacastan)	3:46
8.	"Attention Deficit Disorder"	2:33
9.	"No Such Thing" (featuring Spit Gemz, Nutso and MB Pump)	3:56
10.	"Pieces of Eight (Give Up the Ship)"	2:49
11.	"Run for Your Life" (featuring O.C.)	2:34
12.	"Moses" (featuring Twista and Bun B)	3:23
13.	"Handshakes With Snakes" (featuring Sick Jacken, B-Real and Mariagrazia)	4:12
Total length:		42:20

== Personnel ==
- Chad "Apathy" Bromley – main artist, vocals, producer, arranger, sequencing, mixing, mastering, executive producer
- Vic "Celph Titled" Mercer – featured artist (track 3), executive producer
- Robert Alan "P.H." Diaz – featured artist (track 3)
- Carl Franklin – guitars (track 3)
- John "Ras Kass" Austin – featured artist (track 5)
- Omar "O.C." Credle – featured artist (tracks: 5, 11)
- Michael "Oh No" Jackson – featured artist (track 6)
- Kappa Gamma – featured artist (track 6)
- Marvis "Marvalyss" McDaniel – featured artist (track 7)
- Ira "Blacastan" Osu – featured artist (track 7)
- Raymond "Spit Gemz" Candelario – featured artist (track 9)
- Antonio E. "Nut-Rageous aka Nutso" Lopez – featured artist (track 9)
- MB Pump – backing vocals (track 9)
- Carl "Twista" Mitchell – featured artist (track 12)
- Bernard "Bun B" Freeman – featured artist (track 12)
- Joaquín "Sick Jacken" Gonzalez – featured artist (track 13)
- Louis "B-Real" Freese – featured artist (track 13)
- Maria Grazia – featured artist (track 13)
- Dave Quiggle – illustration
- Open Mic Graphics – graphics

== Charts ==
Chart (2016)	Peak position
US Top R&B/Hip-Hop Albums (Billboard)	36
US Top Rap Albums (Billboard)	22
US Independent Albums (Billboard)	49
US Heatseekers Albums (Billboard)	16
