= MTV VMA Score 2005 =

Soundtrack album / EP by Mike Shinoda and Lil Jon
- Released: August 31, 2005 (EP); March 1, 2010 (score)
- Recorded: 2005
- Genre: Soundtrack; score; experimental
- Length: 4:35 (EP); 13:16 (score)
- Label: MTV
- Producer: Mike Shinoda; Lil Jon; Shinoda (for 2010 version)

Mike Shinoda solo chronology
MTV VMA Score 2005 (2005)	The Raid: Redemption (2012)

Lil Jon chronology
Crunk Juice (2004)	MTV VMA Score 2005 (2005)	Crunk Rock (2010)

MTV VMA Score 2005 is a two-part soundtrack album for the 2005 MTV Video Music Awards. The score was written and produced by rappers Mike Shinoda (of Linkin Park) and Lil Jon. An EP was released on August 31, 2005, in support of the award function. The soundtrack was available for download on the website of MTV during 2005–2006, but the whole album was not available anywhere, so Shinoda released it separately for streaming on his official website on March 1, 2010.

== Background ==
This is the first score by Shinoda, as well as Lil Jon. This was released during the period when Linkin Park went on hiatus and Shinoda was working on his side project Fort Minor from 2004 to 2006. In response to a January 2010 post on LPLive about the unreleased VMA tracks, on March 1, 2010, Mike posted on his blog,

Kinda random: in the past few months, a bunch of you were recently talking about the score I created for the 2005 MTV VMAs (I did a small selection of beats for the show, and scored it with Lil Jon, who contributed his own tracks. We did not collaborate on any, FYI). Some of you have already found the tracks on my SoundCloud page, but I figured I'd post them here. Enjoy!

— Mike Shinoda

Mike Shinoda invited his fans to sing or rap on these songs posted on his website. The SoundCloud page said,

These are the beats that made up some of the soundtrack of 2005's MTV VMAs. I scored the show with Lil Jon. If you rap or sing over one of these beats, make sure to let me know at Mike Shinoda.com

== Content ==
In the score release, fans were treated to new score tracks as well as longer versions of the ones that were released by MTV. The unreleased track from the MTV VMA's turned out to be "Teletronic", and the one from the LPU 9 video called "Catharsis".

In EP, the opening song is a short instrumental version of the song "100 Degrees", which was written by Shinoda from his Fort Minor mixtape We Major. A long version of the song was used in the score and the name was changed to "Hive". The song "Hype" was also released in the limited edition of the EP by Fort Minor, entitled Militia.

In the score album, there was an unreleased track, which is not yet known. It was also not included by Shinoda in score. It was going to be the third track of the score.

== Track listing ==
=== The EP ===
No.	Title	Writer(s)	Length
1.	"100 Degrees"	Mike Shinoda	0:48
2.	"Hype"	Shinoda	0:46
3.	"Saturday"	Lil Jon	0:50
4.	"Montreal"	Shinoda	0:54
5.	"Madison"	Shinoda	1:03
Total length:			4:35

=== The Score ===
No.	Title	Writer(s)	Length
1.	"Hive"	Shinoda	1:56
2.	"Teletronic"	Shinoda	1:49
3.	"Catharsis"	Shinoda	2:06
4.	"Saturday"	Lil Jon	1:34
5.	"Montreal"	Shinoda	1:28
6.	"Selector"	Lil Jon	1:27
7.	"A.15"	Shinoda	0:42
8.	"Hype"	Shinoda	1:32
9.	"Madison"	Shinoda	2:20
Total length:			13:16
