= No Place Like Chrome =

Studio album by Apathy and Celph Titled
- Released: August 14, 2006
- Genre: Hip-hop
- Length: 40:35
- Label: Antidote
- Producers: Apathy; Celph Titled; Chum the Skrilla Gorilla; J-Zone; J.J. Brown; Tzarizm

Apathy chronology
Eastern Philosophy (2006)	No Place Like Chrome (2006)	Wanna Snuggle? (2009)

Celph Titled chronology
Every Hog Has Its Day (2006)	No Place Like Chrome (2006)	Nineteen Ninety Now (2010)

Singles from No Place Like Chrome
- 1. "Sound of the Clap / Nut Reception" Released: 2007

Professional ratings
Review scores
Source	Rating
Idolator	(favorable)
The Skinny	4/5 stars

No Place Like Chrome is the first collaborative studio album by American rappers Apathy and Celph Titled. It was released on August 14, 2006, via Antidote Records. Production was handled by the duo themselves along with Chum The Skrilla Guerilla, J-Zone, J.J. Brown and Tzarizm. It features guest appearances from J-Zone, Majik Most, One Two, Phil da Agony, Rugged and Tzarizm.

== Track listing ==
No.	Title	Writer(s)	Producer(s)	Length
1.	"Naturally Nasty"	Chad Bromley	Apathy	3:27
2.	"Sound of the Clap"	Bromley; Vic Mercer	Celph Titled	4:03
3.	"88 Mindstate"	Bromley; Adam Mathiason	Chum the Skrilla Gorilla	2:56
4.	"Fix Your Face"	Bromley; Mercer	Celph Titled	3:21
5.	"S.M.D."	Mercer; Jay Mumford	J-Zone	3:52
6.	"Maybe"	Bromley	Apathy	3:52
7.	"Bad Attitudes" (featuring One Two)	Bromley; Mercer; One Two	Apathy	3:23
8.	"Donkey Ass" (featuring Majik Most)	Bromley; Mercer; Orlando Majik	Celph Titled	3:32
9.	"Nut Reception" (featuring J-Zone)	Mercer; Mumford; Young Chin	Celph Titled	3:50
10.	"Save the Day"	Bromley; Jason Brown	J.J. Brown	4:22
11.	"Drink Specials" (featuring Tzarizm, Phil da Agony and Rugged)	Mercer; Teric M. Dukes; Jason Smith; Rugged Mania	Tzarizm	3:57
Total length:				40:35

== Personnel ==
- Chad "Apathy" Bromley – performer (tracks: 1–4, 6–8, 10), producer (tracks: 1, 6, 7)
- Vic "Celph Titled" Mercer – performer (tracks: 2, 4, 5, 7–9, 11), producer (tracks: 2, 4, 8, 9), recording (tracks: 2, 4, 5, 8–10), mixing (tracks: 2, 4, 5, 7, 9), additional recording (track 11)
- One Two – featured artist (track 7)
- Majik Most – featured artist (track 8)
- Jay "J-Zone" Mumford – featured artist (track 8), producer & additional mixing (track 5)
- Teric "Tzarizm" Dukes – featured artist, producer, recording & mixing (track 11)
- Jason "Phil da Agony" Smith – featured artist (track 11)
- Rugged Mania – featured artist (track 11)
- Alaina Swanson – vocals (track 6)
- Young Chin – additional vocals (track 9)
- Rico "Tash" Smith – additional vocals (track 11)
- Adam "Chum The Skrilla Guerilla" Mathiason – scratches (tracks: 1, 7), producer (track 3), recording (tracks: 1, 3, 6, 7), mixing (tracks: 1, 3, 6)
- J.U.S.T.I.C.E. League – additional bassline (track 2)
- Jason Brown – scratches & producer (track 10), mixing (tracks: 8–10), additional sequencing (track 8)
- Dan Maier – mixing (track 10)
