= 2000 Fold =

Studio album by Styles of Beyond
- Released: August 18, 1998 (Original); August 24, 1999 (Re-release)
- Recorded: 1997−1998
- Genre: Underground hip hop
- Length: 59:02
- Labels: Bilawn; SpyTech; Mammoth; Ideal
- Producers: Divine Styler; DJ Cheapshot; Vin Skully; Mike Shinoda (for "Marco Polo")

Styles of Beyond chronology
2000 Fold (1998)	Megadef (2003)

Singles from 2000 Fold
- 1. "Easy Back It Up" Released: April 27, 1998; 2. "2000 Fold" Released: August 24, 1998; 3. "Winnetka Exit" Released: August 28, 1998; 4. "Spies Like Us" Released: September 22, 1998

2000 Fold is the debut studio album by Los Angeles underground rap group Styles of Beyond, which was released on Bilawn Records on August 18, 1998, and re-released on August 24, 1999, on SpyTech Records. This album was only released in an "edited version", whereas Megadef was only released in an "explicit version". 2000 Fold was out of print for several years, and was then only available as a download via iTunes and Amazon. In July 2007, it was made available once again in CD format, on both the Projekt Revolution and SpyTech Records official web-stores.

== Background and composition ==
2000 Fold was produced by many producers, but the best known was Divine Styler and Mike Shinoda, who later became a platform for the group to show their talent after 2004. The other producers for the album were the members of the group. It became a breakthrough album for the group. The album cover was designed by Shinoda, and the photography was done by Joe Hahn. The album contains songs, which included samples from various other songs by artists, including Black Moon, Organized Konfusion, Michael Franks, Eric B & Rakim, Mobb Deep, Graham Nash, Chic, A Tribe Called Quest, The Seeds, EPMD and Depeche Mode.

== Singles ==
The album spawned four singles, out of which "Spies Like Us" and its remix, as well as "Easy Back It Up" had a music video. Whereas "Winnetka Exit" and "2000 Fold" did not have a music video.

== Reception ==
=== Critical reception ===
Professional ratings
Review scores
Source	Rating
Allmusic	4/5 stars
RapReviews	(9/10)

2000 Fold received generally positive reviews. The critics gave the album a loud applause and comparing the group with the artists like Prince Paul or Kool Keith. Allmusic gave the album 4 out of 5 stars saying that Styles have professed and display an appreciation for that early-'90s mindset with cleverly used electro-funk samples and rapid rhyming trade offs between Ryu and Takbir. RapReviews gave the album a rating of 9 out of 10 and opposing the censorship in the album saying, "For some reason, this entire album is censored. It makes no sense - but then again, neither does the fact they can freak so many diverse sounds and still retain sanity. If you're not completely satisfied.. well I can't get you your money back, but I'll be damn surprised."

Sputnik music gave the album a rating of 4.5 out of 5, saying that the album is great, and praising the group as, first things first. These guys can rap. No doubt, when you hear the way Ryu and Tak flow you'll be amazed. While Tak presents the smooth-as-silk flow, Ryu brings the punchline pain. A duo of rap Gods that seemed untouchable in that period of time, and even through today they don't go down hard. Safe to say, their debut album is no different.

== Track listing ==
2000 Fold
No.	Title	Samples(s)	Length
1.	"Exile" (Intro)		1:56
2.	"Styles of Beyond (Style Warz)" (featuring DJ Rhettmatic)		4:50
3.	"Hollograms" (featuring Spaceboy Boogie X)	"How Many MC's" by Black Moon "Releasing Hypnotical Gases" by Organized Konfusion "Mr. Blue" by Michael Franks	3:49
4.	"Dangerous Minds"	"Let the Rhythm Hit 'Em" by Eric B & Rakim "Survival of the Fittest" by Mobb Deep	2:47
5.	"Spies Like Us" (featuring Emcee 007)		3:38
6.	"Winnetka Exit"	"Another Sleep Song" by Graham Nash	4:13
7.	"Muuvon"	"Good Times" by Chic	4:02
8.	"Wild Styles" (Interlude)		0:12
9.	"Easy Back It Up"	"Jazz (We've Got)" by A Tribe Called Quest	2:59
10.	"Survival Tactics"		3:38
11.	"Skullyanamayshun"		2:20
12.	"Part II (Endangered)" (featuring Simon James)		3:11
13.	"Gollaxowelcome"		4:31
14.	"Click Beat Box" (Interlude) (featuring Click Tha Supah Latin)		0:47
15.	"Many Styles"		4:43
16.	"Killer Instinct" (featuring Divine Styler)	"Just Let Go" by The Seeds "Strictly Business" by EPMD	4:04
17.	"2000 Fold"		4:59
18.	"Come Out Your Frame" (Interlude) (featuring DJ Rhettmatic)		1:30
19.	"Marco Polo" (featuring Emcee 007)	"Little 15" by Depeche Mode	4:04
20.	"Outro"		0:30
Total length:			59:02

SpyTech Reissue
No.	Title	Length
1.	"Exile" (Intro)	1:56
2.	"Styles of Beyond (Style Warz)" (featuring DJ Rhettmatic)	4:50
3.	"Hollograms" (featuring Spaceboy Boogie X)	3:49
4.	"Dangerous Minds"	2:47
5.	"Spies Like Us" (featuring Emcee 007)	3:38
6.	"Winnetka Exit"	4:13
7.	"Muuvon"	4:02
8.	"Easy Back It Up"	2:59
9.	"Survival Tactics"	3:38
10.	"Skullyanamayshun"	2:20
11.	"Part II (Endangered)" (featuring Simon James)	3:11
12.	"Gollaxowelcome"	4:31
13.	"Click Beat Box" (Interlude) (featuring Click Tha Supah Latin)	0:47
14.	"Killer Instinct" (featuring Divine Styler)	4:04
15.	"2000 Fold"	4:59
16.	"Come Out Your Frame" (Interlude) (featuring DJ Rhettmatic)	1:30
17.	"Marco Polo" (featuring Emcee 007)	4:04
18.	"Outro"	0:30
Total length:		54:11

Projekt Revolution Reissue
No.	Title	Length
1.	"Intro"	1:56
2.	"Styles of Beyond (Style Warz)" (featuring DJ Rhettmatic)	4:50
3.	"Hollograms" (featuring Spaceboy Boogie X)	3:49
4.	"Dangerous Minds"	2:47
5.	"Spies Like Us" (featuring Emcee 007)	3:38
6.	"Winnetka Exit"	4:13
7.	"Muuvon"	4:02
8.	"Easy Back It Up"	2:59
9.	"Survival Tactics"	3:38
10.	"Skullyanamayshun"	2:20
11.	"Part II (Endangered)" (featuring Simon James)	3:11
12.	"Gollaxowelcome"	4:31
13.	"Click Beat Box" (Interlude) (featuring Click Tha Supah Latin)	0:47
14.	"Killer Instinct" (featuring Divine Styler)	4:04
15.	"2000 Fold"	4:59
16.	"Come Out Your Frame" (Interlude) (featuring DJ Rhettmatic)	1:30
17.	"Marco Polo" (featuring Emcee 007)	4:04
18.	"Outro"	0:30
Total length:		54:11

- Only the original 1998 release includes the tracks "Wild Style" and "Many Styles", which were omitted from the reissues because of copyright issues. Additionally, "Exile" was replaced with a new track simply titled "Intro", and the music in "Click Beat Box" was changed.

== Credits ==
- Produced by Divine Styler
- "Marco Polo" produced by Mike Shinoda
- Executive produced by Bilal Bashir, Shawn Berman and Desiree Bashir
- Mastered by Kris Solem at Future Disc
- Art direction and design by Mike Shinoda
- Cover art by Divine Styler
- Photography by Joseph Hahn
