= Wanna Snuggle? =

Studio album by Apathy
- Released: October 6, 2009
- Studio: The Sneakerbox Mansion; Temple Studios (Los Angeles, CA); The Chrome Depot; Ducada Studios; Triple Threat Studios
- Genre: Hip-hop
- Length: 1:06:15
- Label: Demigodz
- Producer: Apathy; Joey Doughnuts; Mike Shinoda; Smoke The World; Teddy Roxpin

Apathy chronology
No Place Like Chrome (2007)	Wanna Snuggle? (2009)	Honkey Kong (2011)

Wanna Snuggle? is the second solo studio album by American rapper and record producer Apathy. It was released on October 6, 2009, via Demigodz Enterprises. Recording sessions took place at The Sneakerbox Mansion, Temple Studios in Los Angeles, The Chrome Depot, Ducada Studios and Triple Threat Studios. Production was handled by Teddy Roxpin, Joey Doughnuts, Mike Shinoda, Smoke The World, and Apathy himself. It features guest appearances from Emilio Lopez, Skylar Grey, Blacastan, Blue Raspberry, B-Real, Celph Titled, Chip Fu, Dose, J-Live, King Magnetic, Mike Mass, Motive, Phonte, Ryu and Veze Skante.

== Critical reception ==
Professional ratings
Review scores
Source	Rating
HipHopDX	4/5
PopMatters	6/10

Slava Kuperstein of HipHopDX praised the album, concluding "as it stands, Wanna Snuggle? falls short of spectacular, but it is a memorable addition to not only Apathy's catalog, but any head's collection as well". Aaron Matthews of Exclaim! stated: "the album's first half is excellent but Wanna Snuggle?'s back end is loaded with second-string guests and overwrought concept tracks". Andrew Martin of PopMatters wrote: "what's frustrating about this is Apathy made this album unreasonably long at 21 tracks that clock in at nearly 70 minutes. Take the editor's scissors to the tracklist, get rid of seven to eight tracks, and you would have what is close to a perfect album".

== Track listing ==
Wanna Snuggle? track listing
No.	Title	Producer(s)	Length
1.	"Hell's Angel"	Apathy	1:27
2.	"Money Orientated" (featuring Emilio Lopez)	Apathy	3:07
3.	"Gov't Cheese"	Apathy	1:33
4.	"On and off the Mic" (featuring Blacastan)	Apathy	3:05
5.	"Back in L.A." (featuring Ryu and Veze Skante)	Apathy	4:25
6.	"Shoot First" (featuring B-Real and Celph Titled)	Mike Shinoda	3:16
7.	"I'm a Demigod"	Teddy Roxpin	3:49
8.	"True Love" (featuring Phonte)	Apathy	3:34
9.	"Mind Ya Business" (featuring Chip Fu)	Apathy	2:42
10.	"Thinkin'"	Apathy	3:04
11.	"This Is the Formula" (featuring J-Live)	Apathy	3:39
12.	"Guys & Girls" (featuring Blue Raspberry)	Apathy	3:08
13.	"Anyday" (featuring King Magnetic)	Apathy; Joey Doughnuts	3:18
14.	"Candy" (featuring Dose)	Apathy	3:07
15.	"Run, Run Away"	Apathy	2:40
16.	"No Sad Tomorrow" (featuring Holly Brook and Mike Mass)	Apathy; Smoke The World	3:16
17.	"Rhode Island" (featuring Emilio Lopez)	Teddy Roxpin	3:27
18.	"What Goes Up"	Apathy	2:38
19.	"Hard Times on Planet Earth"	Teddy Roxpin	3:01
20.	"Slave" (featuring Motive)	Apathy	3:51
21.	"Victim" (featuring Holly Brook)	Apathy	4:08
Total length:			1:06:15

== Personnel ==
- Chad "Apathy" Bromley – vocals, producer (tracks: 1–5, 8–16, 18, 20, 21), mixing
- Emilio Lopez – vocals (tracks: 2, 17)
- Ira "Blacastan" Osu – vocals (track 4)
- Ryan Patrick "Ryu" Maginn – vocals (track 5)
- Richard "Veze Skante" Morales – vocals (track 5)
- Louis "B-Real" Freese – vocals (track 6)
- Vic "Celph Titled" Mercer – vocals (track 6)
- Phonte Coleman – vocals (track 8)
- Roderick "Chip Fu" Roachford – vocals (track 9)
- Jean-Jacques "J-Live" Cadet – vocals (track 11)
- Candi "Blue Raspberry" Lindsey – vocals (track 12)
- Jason "King Magnetic" Faust – vocals (track 13)
- Dose – vocals (track 14)
- Holly Brook "Skylar Grey" Hafermann – vocals (tracks: 16, 21)
- Mike Mass – vocals (track 16)
- Tim "Motive" Cook – vocals (track 20), additional vocals (track 4)
- Adam Mathiason – additional vocals (track 4), scratches (tracks: 6, 8, 15, 20)
- Edgar "Vertygo" Cruz – keyboards & bass (track 12)
- Joey Doughnuts – additional guitar & producer (track 13)
- Ed Briones – bass (track 15)
- Matthew "DJ Mekalek" Katz – scratches (track 17)
- Mike Shinoda – producer (track 6)
- Teddy "Roxpin" Rosenthal – producer (tracks: 7, 17, 19)
- E. Michael "Smoke The World" Montavon – producer (track 16)
- Rod Duchaineau – illustration
- Chris B. Murray – illustration
- Mike LaRose – graphics, layout
