= Vanderslice =

Vanderslice is a surname. Notable people with the surname include:

- Howard Vanderslice (1853–1929), American businessman
- John M. Vanderslice, American soldier
- John Vanderslice (born 1967), American musician, songwriter, record producer, and recording engineer
