= Connecticut Casual =

Studio album by Apathy
- Released: June 3, 2014
- Genre: Hip-hop
- Length: 41:38
- Label: Dirty Version Records
- Producers: Apathy; Da Beatminerz; Smoke The World; Teddy Roxpin; The Doppelgangaz

Apathy chronology
Honkey Kong (2011)	Connecticut Casual (2014)	Handshakes with Snakes (2016)

Professional ratings
Review scores
Source	Rating
RapReviews	5.5/10
The Needle Drop	8/10

Connecticut Casual is the fourth solo studio album by American hip-hop recording artist Apathy. It was released on June 3, 2014 through Dirty Version Records. Production was handled by Teddy Roxpin, Da Beatminerz, Smoke The World, The Doppelgangaz, and Apathy himself, who produced the majority of the project. It features guest appearances from Kappa Gamma, Hayze, ANoyd, Chris Webby and Danaya.

Music videos were released for songs "The Grand Leveler", "The Curse Of The Kennedys" and "Martha Moxley (R.I.P.)".

In the United States, the album debuted at number 41 on the Top R&B/Hip-Hop Albums, number 24 on the Top Rap Albums and number 13 on the Heatseekers Albums charts.

A 24-track Instrumentals + Acapellas version of the album with slightly different cover art was released on the same day. Its sequel, Connecticut Casual: Chapter 2, was released on April 12, 2024.

== Background ==
In July 2013, through his Twitter account, Apathy announced he was working on a new extended play titled Connecticut Casual. Apathy later stated on Facebook that the EP would be available for free download. It was initially to be released mid-April 2014 but the date was pushed back to May 2014, in the light of his super-group Army of the Pharaohs' album In Death Reborn, being released commercially in April. On March 19, 2014, Apathy revealed that Connecticut Casual will be an album instead of an EP now and will drop on June 3, 2014.

Connecticut Casual has been described as an album that uncovers the darker sides of New England that most people are unfamiliar with. "From the opulent lifestyle of the Kennedy family, to the economically destitute neighbourhoods of Connecticut, Rhode Island and Massachusetts. Mansions and projects. Tennis courts and bodegas. Summers spent on the shores of the Atlantic. Mysterious meetings in Masonic lodges. Homicides that go unsolved due to inadequate law enforcement budgets in poor areas, to literally getting away with murder by being well connected to East Coast royalty".

== Track listing ==
No.	Title	Producer(s)	Length
1.	"Connecticut Casual"	Da Beatminerz	4:13
2.	"Back In New England" (featuring Chris Webby)	Apathy; Teddy Roxpin (co.)	3:38
3.	"Don't Give Up the Ship" (featuring Kappa Gamma)	Apathy	3:35
4.	"Locals Only!" (featuring ANoyd)	Apathy	3:50
5.	"The Curse of the Kennedy's"	Apathy	2:46
6.	"Martha Moxley (Rest In Peace)"	Apathy	3:51
7.	"Jack Ruby" (featuring Kappa Gamma)	Apathy	3:09
8.	"The Grass Ain't Greener" (featuring Hayze and Danaya)	Teddy Roxpin	3:52
9.	"Money Makes the World Go Round" (featuring Hayze and Kappa Gamma)	Apathy	3:13
10.	"Underground Chick"	Apathy	2:31
11.	"Beefin' Over Bitches" (featuring Kappa Gamma)	The Doppelgangaz	3:50
12.	"The Grand Leveler"	Smoke The World	3:10
Total length:			41:38

== Personnel ==
- Chad "Apathy" Bromley – vocals, producer (tracks: 2–7, 9, 10), recording, mixing, mastering
- Christian "Chris Webby" Webster – vocals (track 2)
- Kappa Gamma – vocals (tracks: 3, 7, 9, 11)
- ANoyd – vocals (track 4)
- Hayze – vocals (tracks: 8, 9)
- Danaya – vocals (track 8)
- Da Beatminerz – producers (track 1)
- Teddy "Roxpin" Rosenthal – producer (track 8), co-producer (track 2)
- The Doppelgangaz – producers (track 11)
- E. Michael "Smoke The World" Montavon – producer (track 12)
- Chris B. Murray – illustration
- Daria Anna – photography
- Open Mic Graphics – graphics

== Charts ==
Chart (2014)	Peak position
US Top R&B/Hip-Hop Albums (Billboard)	41
US Top Rap Albums (Billboard)	24
US Heatseekers Albums (Billboard)	13
