= DJ Cheapshot =

American rapper

- Born: Colton Rason Fisher; March 5, 1977 (age 49); Los Angeles County, California, U.S.
- Origin: Burbank, California
- Occupations: DJ; record producer
- Labels: Spytech; Demigodz

DJ Cheapshot (born Colton Rason Fisher) is the DJ of the hip hop ensemble Styles of Beyond, Get Busy Committee, and Fort Minor. He is also associated with the Demigodz and the Get Busy Committee, as well as being the founder of SpyTech Records, which is located in Reseda, Los Angeles, and formally owned the Cheapshot's bar, which is located in Long Beach, California under new ownership as the Stache. He is the COO of Grammy-nominated music production camp The Math Club, which creates custom music for film and television with music supervision partner Dave Jordan. Cheapshot currently resides in Burbank, California.

== Musical career ==
From the mid-1990s to the late 2000s, Styles of Beyond was a pivotal force in the uprising of underground hip hop. During his stint as a DJ for the group, Cheapshot also became a part of Mike Shinoda's side project, Fort Minor, which saw critical acclaim. After the success of their debut record, The Rising Tied, Fort Minor toured across the world to promote the album. Styles of Beyond was then signed onto Shinoda's label Machine Shop Recordings, as well as its parent label Warner Bros. Records. The group was later added to the lineup of Linkin Park's 2007 Projekt Revolution tour.

After years of touring and releasing records, the members of Styles of Beyond took an extended hiatus to pursue their own ventures. Cheapshot and producer Vin Skully teamed up to form a songwriting duo known as The Math Club, creating music for film and television under the guidance of legendary music supervisor Dave Jordan. Through The Math Club, Cheapshot has participated in creating original songs, beats, and cues for a multitude of movies and television shows, including The Lego Batman Movie, Shazam, Spider-Man: Far From Home, Big Mouth, Always Be My Maybe, Avengers: Age of Ultron, Ant-Man, and Euphoria.

== Solo Releases ==
Cheapshot also has released several solo CDs, Vinyls, and Mixtapes, which are listed below, along with several digital releases Cheapshot has released on the Styles Of Beyond fan-site, SOBCentral.

Mixtapes:

- Fort Minor: Sampler Mixtape (2005)
- DJ Cheapshot Presents... Mega Dudical (2007)
- DJ Cheapshot & DJ Marshall Barnes: Party Mouth! (2007)
- True Love & False Idols Presents: Jazzercidal Tendencies (2008)
- Club Footed (2009)
- True Love & False Idols Presents: Jazzercidal Tendencies Part 2 (2011)

Other (Vinyl):

- Cheapshot's Sucka' Breaks: Beat (Downs), Cuts & Nosebleeds (1998)

SOBCentral releases:

- Here We Come (Remix)
- Murderer (Remix)
- Alcohol

Other (MP3):

- Cheapshot Anthem
