= Styles of Beyond =

American hip hop group

- Also known as: S.O.B.
- Origin: Los Angeles, California, U.S.
- Genres: Underground hip hop; alternative hip hop; rap rock
- Years active: 1994–2009; 2012–2017
- Labels: SpyTech; Machine Shop; Bilawn; Ideal; Hi Ho; Mammoth
- Members: Takbir Bashir (Tak); Ryan Patrick Maginn (Ryu); Colton Raisin Fisher (DJ Cheapshot); Jason Rabinowitz (Vin Skully, Jubacca)

Styles of Beyond are an American underground hip hop group from the San Fernando Valley of Los Angeles, California. The group consists of MCs Ryan Patrick Maginn (Ryu) and Takbir Bashir (Tak), Colton Raisin Fisher (DJ Cheapshot), and producer Jason Rabinowitz (Vin Skully). They have released two LPs, one mixtape and were heavily featured on Mike Shinoda's Fort Minor project in 2005. At one point they were also signed to Shinoda's Machine Shop Recordings label, although they left the label in late 2008. They are also heavily associated with the underground rap group Demigodz which features similar underground artists such as Apathy, Celph Titled, and 7L & Esoteric.

== History ==
=== Early years (1994–2004) ===
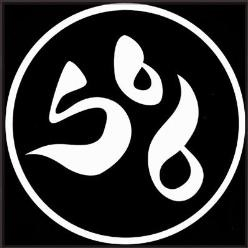
SOB Insignia

After making some pre-Ryu demos on a 4-track cassette recorder, Styles of Beyond started making appearances on Sway & King Tech's The Wake Up Show, a hip hop radio program featuring established and up-and-coming rappers. In the late 1990s, the group met longtime collaborator and friend Mike Shinoda, who would later become the co-creator and co-vocalist of Linkin Park. The group eventually released two independent studio albums, 2000 Fold (1998), and Megadef (2003).

=== Machine Shop/Warner Bros. era (2005–2008) ===
Styles of Beyond was later announced by Shinoda to feature on his solo hip hop record under the name Fort Minor, The Rising Tied, which was released on November 22, 2005. The group appeared on seven songs on the album, and appeared on the album's singles "Remember the Name" and "Believe Me". The group joined Fort Minor on tour in promotion of the album. After touring for The Rising Tied, Styles of Beyond was signed onto Shinoda's label Machine Shop Recordings, as well as its parent label Warner Bros. Records, their first major label. The group was later added to the lineup of Linkin Park's 2007 Projekt Revolution tour, featured on the Revolution Stage.

Styles of Beyond released a mixtape on July 31, 2007, entitled Razor Tag, presented and mixed by DJ Green Lantern. Razor Tag was the group's first release under Machine Shop and Warner Bros. The group completed their third studio album, Reseda Beach, with announced guest rappers RZA, Apathy, Celph Titled, Sixx John, and Mike Shinoda. The album was produced by the group, as well as Shinoda, J Dilla and Scoop DeVille. One of the album's songs, "Second to None", which features Shinoda, was included in the soundtrack of the 2007 film Transformers. "Second to None" was also featured in promos for the television shows Prison Break and K-Ville, as well as the trailer for the 2008 film You Don't Mess with the Zohan. The group also made a cameo appearance in the music video for "We Made It" by Busta Rhymes and Linkin Park, which was released on April 29, 2008.

=== Departure from Machine Shop, hiatus and solo projects (2008–2011) ===
On September 25, 2008, Styles of Beyond released their contract with Machine Shop Recordings with full ownership of their Reseda Beach record, which they plan to release under Dirty Version Records, which was manned by close friends and Demigodz members Apathy and Celph Titled. Reseda Beach served as the first release of Dirty Version. Since 2008, Ryu, Apathy and Scoop DeVille formed a new rap group by the name of the "Get Busy Committee". They released their first album "Uzi Does It" on October 27, 2009. Tak has also formed a solo group along with singer Josy B called "Ribkat" (which is "Takbir" spelled backwards, Takbir Bashir being Tak's real name). They plan on releasing an album entitled Theory of Addicts in December 2009.

Ryu stated recently in an interview with LPLive that the current status of Styles of Beyond is unknown. In the interview he stated "The Warner thing I think mentally exhausted everybody, I think it was just time to do something fresh and new. Business wise and creatively. The status of the group is unknown at this point. It just felt like we were beating a dead horse after a while."

=== Reseda Beach and inactivity (2012–present) ===
Recently, during a fan chat, Ryu revealed that a completed version of Reseda Beach exists. The first track from Reseda Beach leaked in early September 2012, named "Damn" and featuring guest vocals from fellow Warner Bros. recording artist Michael Bublé. Reseda Beach was eventually available for pre-order on the Demigodz store in the same month, including the track "The Pirate Song" on SoundCloud. The album was released on October 23, 2012.

In November 2014, Ryu tweeted that Styles of Beyond is still active and, along with Divine Styler, will be undertaking a Canadian tour.

In 2015, Fort Minor released a new single entitled "Welcome" in which Ryu has a cameo appearance in the music video.

In November 2017, Ryu tweeted a screenshot of a conversation with Tak with the duo planning another album. The album never materialized, however, and the group has made no further announcements of any kind.

== Appearances/remixes ==
The Megadef track "Superstars" was featured in the games WWE Day of Reckoning, WWE SmackDown vs. RAW, WWE WrestleMania 21, Grant Mohrman did a remix of the track called "Nine Thou" which was featured in the games Need for Speed: Most Wanted, Stuntman: Ignition, "Score International Baja 1000", Both films Real Steel and Lost Boys: The Tribe, and on the TV shows Friday Night Lights and Prison Break. However, the song cut out its dirty lyrics and replaced them with words connected to the games. The song "Subculture" (from the unreleased album Terraform) was featured in Tony Hawk's Pro Skater 2 and its subsequent remake Tony Hawk's Pro Skater 1 + 2. Styles of Beyond collaborated with Celldweller for a track entitled "Shapeshifter" which appeared on the soundtrack for the movie Redline and also both of the games Need for Speed: Most Wanted and MX vs ATV Untamed.

The track "Underground Sound" is an opening soundtrack for the first set of Aggressive inline skating tricks in "VG12: Battle My Crew” 1999 skate video.

Styles of Beyond has collaborated with SpyTech artists: Lexicon, Sandman, 4-Zone, and Divine Styler. They have also collaborated with: Awol One, The Crystal Method, and Ryu and Tak performed "Points of Authority" live with Linkin Park in 2001 at the House of Blues.

On December 17, 2007, it was revealed that DJ Cheapshot and Vin Skully had been chosen and hired to complete the entire score for the upcoming A&E original series L.A. Gang Unit, which was slated for an April 2008 release, but has yet to be released. DJ Cheapshot opened his own bar called Cheapshot's, which is located in Long Beach, California. Ryu was featured along with Bishop Lamont on the track "Dirty Girl Part 2" by Rob Dyrdek (Bobby Light). This song is available on iTunes and was performed with Blink-182 drummer Travis Barker in Las Vegas. It also was featured on Rob Dyrdek's Fantasy Factory.

== Discography ==
- 2000 Fold (1998, Ideal)
- Megadef (2003, SpyTech)
- Reseda Beach (2012, Dirty Version)
