= Demigodz =

American hip hop group

Background information
- Origin: Connecticut, U.S.
- Genres: Hip-hop; underground hip-hop
- Years active: 1990–present (hiatus 2013–2021)
- Label: Demigodz Records
- Members: Apathy; Celph Titled; Esoteric; Motive; Ryu
- Past members: 7L; Chum the Skrilla Guerilla; De Ja Vu; DJ Cheapshot; Eternia; Feedback; Louis Logic; Rise; Naptron; Open Mic; Reflex; Tak; Vin Skully; Majik Most; Jabberjaw; L-Fudge; One Two; Metropolis; Spin 4th; Blacastan (Deceased)
- Website: demigodz.com

Demigodz are an American hip-hop collective founded by Connecticut rappers Open Mic and Reflex. The group was originally named "The Nobility" but Open Mic renamed the group "The Demigodz" with inspiration from one of his own verses. The group has changed several times through the years. As of 2012, the group consists of; Apathy, Celph Titled, Ryu, Esoteric, Motive, & Blacastan.

The group was originally formed in 1990 by Connecticut emcees Open Mic and Reflex. Apathy joined the group after hearing a demo on the University of Connecticut radio station 91.7. The group expanded during the 1990s to include several other members, and they took frequent outings to New York City in order to expose themselves to the East Coast hip-hop scene. In the late 1990s, Apathy shifted his focus towards developing his solo career, but the group re-formed in 2000 with Celph Titled, Rise, Open Mic, One-Two, L-Fudge, Louis Logic, and 7L & Esoteric, as well as producer Chum the Skrilla Guerilla. After touring extensively in Europe, the group released the EP "The Godz Must Be Crazy" in 2002.

In 2004, a number of members left the group, leaving only Apathy, Celph Titled, and 7L & Esoteric. New members were subsequently added, including Motive, Blacastan, and Ryu from Styles of Beyond. In 2007, they released the LP "The Godz Must Be Crazier."

In March 2013, Demigodz released their second full-length album, Killmatic, which features guest appearances from Scoop DeVille and R.A. the Rugged Man and production from DJ Premier. After performing as a group for the first time with all members present in November 2012 in Pawtucket, Rhode Island, Apathy and Celph Titled embarked on a tour to promote the new album including venues in the United States and Australia. The album received critical acclaim for its adherence to the lyricism and aesthetic of golden age hip-hop.

== History ==
The Demigodz were founded in 1990 and were originally called The Nobility by rappers who were in their teens at the time; Reflex and Open Mic from Connecticut; they were strongly influenced by the progressive hip-hop of the time, including the Native Tongues Posse and Public Enemy. The pair recorded countless tracks in Reflex garage with lyrics focusing on sci-fi and conspiracy theories.

In an effort to be recognized, the do connected with Connecticut Radio's DJ; Cool C. He played their songs over the local college airwaves, the gossip created by local talk resulted in numerous battles with local rappers, this also increased recognition of the increasingly popular teens. It was also during this time that Open Mic renamed the group to "The Demigodz", this was due to inspiration from one of his own verses. One day when the band played at UConn's 91.7 radio station, they caught the attention of rapper, Apathy, who was also in his teens at the time.

By the end of 1993 Reflex and Feedback left the group and formed a separate rap group called "Skin N Bones". Open Mic brought in Apathy (who was then known as Apathy Alien tongue) as a member of the group. Alien Nation rap affiliates; Eternia and Naptron were chosen to join The Demigodz roster. They put out a new demo that circulated around the underground rap scene and created gossip on the independent hip-hop scene.

In 1996, Apathy made contact with Jedi Mind Tricks' Vinnie Paz (then known as "Ikon the Verbal Hologram"). Paz invited Apathy and Eternia down to Philadelphia to record verses with each other he was later featured on Jedi Mind Tricks The Psycho-Social, Chemical, Biological & Electro-Magnetic Manipulation of Human Consciousness, on the tracks "The Three Immortals", "Omnicron" and "The Apostles' Creed". Due to good relation with Jedi Mind Tricks, it led to several extensions and new members to join, including duo 7L & Esoteric.

By mid-1997, Eternia and Naptron left The Demigodz group due to personal and musical differences, this also meant the end of the groups relationship with Alien Nation. Apathy began to work as a solo artist and put out several singles and appeared on many compilation discs. Apathy kept the Demigodz name alive by successfully competing in frequent rap battles and openings for acts as Rakim and Black Moon. Apathy was introduced to Celph Titled, who was attached to a distribution company in New York, soon moved up to the city get a chance to see him personally. Celph also introduced Apathy to the Bronx Science label with which he signed a contract and went on to produce an album Vinyl 12" for the record label.

In 2000 Apathy officially reformed the Demigodz. The new line up included Apathy, Celph Titled, Rise and One Two. Apathy also brought Open Mic out of retirement in the following months and several more additions were made, including L-Fudge, Louis Logic, Spin 4th, and longtime friends 7L & Esoteric. The culmination of their efforts during this era was their EP The Godz Must Be Crazy, which was released in 2002.

In 2004 most of the members left the group; the only members that remained were Apathy, Chum the Skrilla Guerilla, Celph Titled and 7L & Esoteric. They then affiliated with Los Angeles-based Styles of Beyond and joined the Jedi Mind Tricks supergroup collective Army of the Pharaohs.

Apathy released a single on January 15, 2007 named "DemiGodzilla" featuring Motive and Celph Titled. The album was renamed to The Godz Must Be Crazier and was released on November 20, 2007.

In 2009, Get Busy Committee was formed in Los Angeles, California by longtime friends Ryu (Styles of Beyond), Apathy and Scoop DeVille. All production was done by Scoop DeVille and Apathy, while vocals are given by everyone in the group. Their debut album, Uzi Does It, was released for pre-sale download on October 27, 2009 at www.getbusycommittee.com, and available on iTunes and other outlets on November 10. As a result of this, DemiGodz production was put on halt.

Apathy and Celph Titled, 2014

On 23 November 2011, Apathy uploaded a new song onto YouTube called "Demigodz Is Back", which featured Apathy, Ryu and Celph Titled, produced by Apathy. The song marked the return of Demigodz.

On May 10, 2012, the pair announced in an interview with hiphopauthority.com that they are working on a new Demigodz album, titled Killmatic. Celph said that the album would contain all six members "Which is: Apathy, Celph Titled, Ryu, Esoteric, Motive, Blacastan." Killmatic was officially released March 5, 2013.

In March 2013, Demigodz released their second full-length album, Killmatic. It features artists from[Scoop DeVille and R.A. the Rugged Man and production from DJ Premier. After performing as a group for the first time with all members present in November 2012 in Pawtucket, Rhode Island, Apathy and Celph Titled embarked on a tour to promote the new album including venues in the United States and Australia. The album has received critical acclaim for its adherence to Golden Era hip-hop aesthetics and lyricism.

In April 2014, Apathy announced that, he and Celph Titled will be working on another album, as a duo, titled Will Sing for Vengeance and is likely to be released during 2015.

== Discography ==
=== Albums ===
- The Godz Must Be Crazier (2007)
- Killmatic (2013)

=== EPs ===
- Sureshot Affair (1998)
- The Godz Must Be Crazy (2002)

=== Miscellaneous ===
- Demigodz Sampler (2004)
- Demigodz Winter Sampler (2004)

=== Singles ===
- "Don't You Even Go There / Well, Well, Well" (2002) [12"]

== See also ==
- List of record labels
- Underground hip-hop
