= Get Busy Committee =

American hip-hop group

- Origin: Los Angeles, California
- Genres: Hip-hop
- Years active: 2009–2013
- Label: Tokyo Sex Whale Records
- Members: Apathy; Ryu; Scoop DeVille

Get Busy Committee (a.k.a. GBC) was a hip-hop group consisting of underground rapper Apathy, Styles of Beyond's Ryu, and producer Scoop DeVille.

== Group Info ==
Get Busy Committee was formed in Los Angeles, California, by longtime friends Ryu, Apathy and Scoop DeVille.

They claim their influences come from Eazy-E, BBD (Bell Biv DeVoe), BDP (Boogie Down Productions). All production is done by Scoop DeVille and Apathy, while vocals are given by everyone in the group. Their debut album, Uzi Does It, was released for pre-sale download on October 27, 2009, at www.getbusycommittee.com, and available on iTunes and other outlets on November 10, 2009. The album is a 100% self-funded and self-released independent record.

Like, my album is underground. Demigodz is super underground. But Get Busy Committee is gonna be something really fuckin’ crazy. We have Topspin Media behind us. We have [Mike] Shinoda behind us. We got the dudes at MySpace Music heavily behind us. So Get Busy Committee is gonna be something else...[And] if you don’t like it, I don’t know what to tell you.

— Apathy, Interview with HipHopDX

== Future ==
As of 2012, Get Busy Committee is on hiatus, or "dead" as they refer to the status of the group. A recorded album, Opening Ceremony, remains unreleased, while the group members focus on their solo careers.

== Collaborations ==
- "Suicide Music" - from The Raid: Redemption by Mike Shinoda and Joseph Trapanese (2012)

== Discography ==
=== Group releases ===
Album information
Uzi Does It
- Released: 2009
- Label: Tokyo Sex Whale Records
- Singles:
  Chillin Out Maxin
  I Dont Care About You
