= Celph Titled =

American rapper

- Celph Titled (left) with Apathy, 2014

Background information
- Born: Victor Mercer
- Genres: Hip-hop
- Occupations: Rapper; record producer; songwriter
- Years active: 1993–present
- Labels: Demigodz; No Sleep
- Member of: Demigodz; Army of the Pharaohs
- Website: celphtitled.com

Victor Mercer, better known by his stage name Celph Titled, is an American rapper and record producer who is a member of the hip-hop supergroup Army of the Pharaohs, as well as the Demigodz along with Connecticut rapper Apathy, Ryu from Get Busy Committee, and rapper Blacastan and Esoteric.

Mercer began his career in New York City, working as an in-house producer and A&R representative. The now-defunct BUDS International and Bronx Science Records released all of his early records on vinyl, including those of his original group, Equilibrium, and singles from his longstanding partner, Apathy. Grammy Award–winner Mike Shinoda, of Linkin Park, invited Mercer to join his Los Angeles cohorts, Styles of Beyond, as an official part of Fort Minor's album The Rising Tied (2005).

After working with DJ Green Lantern on the Invasion "Fort Minor: We Major" mixtape, Mercer embarked on a nationwide tour with Fort Minor in 2006. Mercer released The Gatalog, a four-disc set of his guest appearances and freestyles, going back to his early releases from 1998, as his official first offering to a thriving fanbase that already viewed him as a seasoned veteran. After the release of The Gatalog and a move back to Tampa, Mercer spent three years working with D.I.T.C. multi-platinum producer, Buckwild, on his first album, Nineteen Ninety Now, released on October 26, 2010, on No Sleep Recordings.

== Career ==
Mercer moved to New York City and began working as an in-house producer and A&R. The now-defunct BUDS International and Bronx Science Records released all of his early records on vinyl, including those of his original group, Equilibrium, and singles from his longstanding partner, Apathy.

Grammy Award–winner Mike Shinoda, of Linkin Park, invited Mercer to join his Los Angeles cohorts, Styles of Beyond, as an official part of Fort Minor's album The Rising Tied (2005), released on Linkin Park's Machine Shop Recordings/Warner Bros. Records. Shinoda handled production for the album. Jay-Z, who worked with Linkin Park on their collaborative EP Collision Course, served as an executive producer for the album. Shinoda collaborated with many longtime friends (such as hip-hop group Styles of Beyond, Jonah Matranga, Holly Brook and Linkin Park turntablist Joe Hahn), as well as many notable and underground hip-hop and R&B artists (such as Common, John Legend, Black Thought, Lupe Fiasco, Kenna, Eric Bobo, Sixx John and Celph Titled) for the album.

After working with DJ Green Lantern on the Invasion "Fort Minor: We Major" mixtape, Mercer embarked on a nationwide tour with Fort Minor in 2006. The mixtape was made as a warm-up/prequel to promote their first album The Rising Tied, and was first released on the internet as a free download.

Mercer released a compilation titled The Gatalog, a four-disc set of his guest appearances and freestyles, going back to his early releases from 1998, as his official first offering to a thriving fanbase that already viewed him as a seasoned veteran. After the release of The Gatalog and a move back to Tampa, Mercer spent three years working with the Diggin' In The Crates (D.I.T.C.) multi-platinum producer, Buckwild, on his first album, Nineteen Ninety Now, released on October 26, 2010, on No Sleep Recordings.

On January 14, 2013, Apathy confirmed that Killmatic would be released on March 5. Along with that, he confirmed the official album art. Four days later, Apathy, through his YouTube account, released the first single for Killmatic titled "Demigodz Is Back". On May 5, 2013, Demigodz released their second studio album titled Killmatic. It featured all members including Celph Titled, Apathy, Motive, Blacastan, Esoteric and Ryu. In Death Reborn, Army of the Pharaohs fourth studio album, is set to be released April, 2014 and is stated to have Celph Titled on the album. On November 30, 2013, Vinnie Paz revealed that two new Army Of The Pharaohs albums would be released in 2014. The first album; In Death Reborn is slated for a release on 22 April and the second LP is expected to drop in November. Celph Titled is confirmed to be on the upcoming albums; new members including Demigodz member Blacastan and Zilla from Houston, Texas are said to be joining the group.

== Discography ==
=== Albums ===
- The Rubix Cuban (Unreleased)
- 2006: The Gatalog: A Collection of Chaos
- The Fresh Prince of Hell's Lair (Unreleased)

=== Collaborations ===
==== Army of the Pharaohs ====
- 2006: The Torture Papers
- 2007: Ritual of Battle
- 2010: The Unholy Terror
- 2014: In Death Reborn
- 2014: Heavy Lies the Crown

==== Demigodz ====
- 2007: The Godz Must Be Crazier (with Demigodz)
- 2013: Killmatic (with Demigodz)

==== Boss Hog Barbarians (with J-Zone) ====
- 2006: Every Hog Has Its Day

==== With Apathy ====
- 2006: No Place Like Chrome
- TBA: Will Sing for Vengeance

==== With Buckwild ====
- 2010: Nineteen Ninety Now
- 2011: Nineteen Ninety More

==== With Stu Bangas ====
- 2024: New Unnamed Album

== See also ==
- List of people from Tampa, Florida
- List of record producers
- Music of Florida
- Music of New York City
