= Scoop DeVille =

American record producer (born 1987)

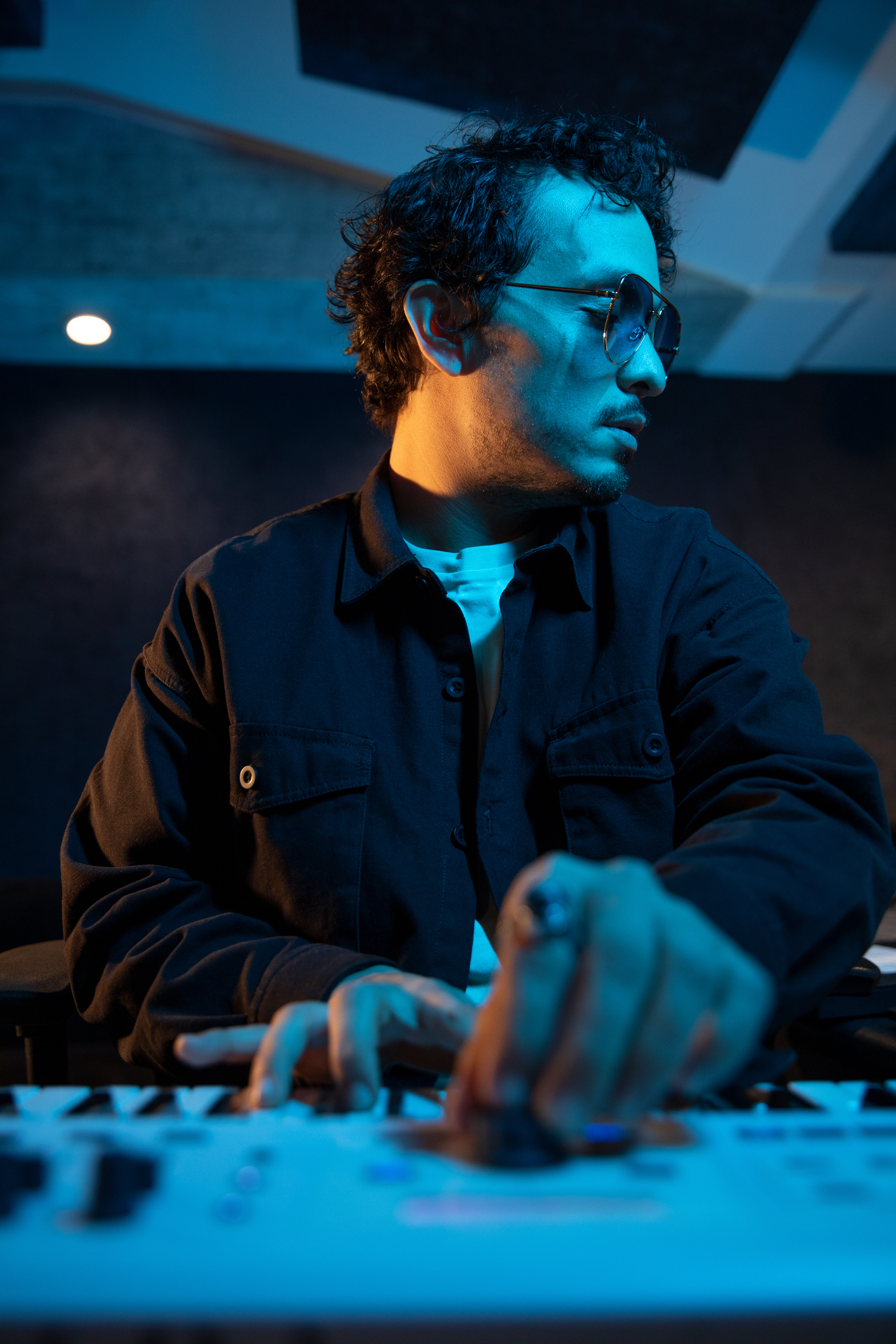
- Scoop DeVille in 2021

Background information
- Born: Elijah Blue Molina; October 15, 1987 (age 38)
- Origin: Los Angeles, California, U.S.
- Genres: Hip hop
- Occupations: Record producer; rapper; DJ
- Years active: 2005–present
- Formerly of: Get Busy Committee

Elijah Blue Molina (born October 15, 1987), better known by his stage name Scoop DeVille, is an American record producer, rapper and DJ. DeVille has produced singles and albums for hip hop artists including Kendrick Lamar, Dr. Dre, Snoop Dogg, Nipsey Hussle, 50 Cent, Busta Rhymes and Fat Joe. He produced Kendrick Lamar's 2013 single "Poetic Justice" and Snoop Dogg's 2009 single "I Wanna Rock", both of which peaked within the top 50 of the US Billboard Hot 100. DeVille is also a former member of hip hop group Get Busy Committee.

== Early life ==
Molina was born in Los Angeles, and is the son of Latino hip-hop pioneer Kid Frost. At age three, he was seen being carried in his father's arms in the video for Kid Frost's 1990 single “La Raza.” Raised in a musical family, Molina started rapping at the age of two, writing music at the age of nine, and produced his first hit single, "Mamacita" by Baby Bash, at fifteen.

== Career ==
DeVille has produced songs such as "The Recipe" by Kendrick Lamar featuring Dr. Dre, "Poetic Justice" by Kendrick Lamar featuring Drake, "I Wanna Rock" by Snoop Dogg featuring Jay-Z, "Wait Until Tonight" by 50 Cent, "(Haha) Slow Down" by Fat Joe ft. Young Jeezy, "Calm Down" by Busta Rhymes ft. Eminem, "Nate" by Vince Staples ft. James Fauntleroy, and "Trouble On Central" by Buddy.

DeVille was nominated for a Grammy in the categories of Best Rap Album and Album of the Year for his production on Kendrick Lamar's major-label debut Good Kid, M.A.A.D City.

== Production discography ==
=== Singles ===
Year	Single	Chart positions			Album
Year	Single	US Hot 100	US R&B	US Rap	Album
2008	"Life of da Party" (Snoop Dogg featuring Too Short & Mistah F.A.B.)	105	48	14	Ego Trippin'
2009	"I Wanna Rock" (Snoop Dogg)	41	10	3	Malice n Wonderland
2010	"(Ha Ha) Slow Down" (Fat Joe featuring Young Jeezy)	–	54	23	The Darkside, Vol. 1
2010	"New Year's Eve" (Snoop Dogg featuring Marty James)	–	66	–	Non-album single
2011	"Haters" (Tony Yayo featuring 50 Cent, Shawty Lo & Roscoe Dash)	–	112	–	
2012	"The Recipe" (Kendrick Lamar featuring Dr. Dre)	103	38	23	good kid, m.A.A.d city
2013	"Poetic Justice" (Kendrick Lamar featuring Drake)	26	8	6	good kid, m.A.A.d city
2014	"Calm Down" (Busta Rhymes featuring Eminem)	94	29	16	E.L.E.2 (Extinction Level Event 2)
2022	"= (Equal Sign)" (j-hope)				Jack In The Box
2023	"Give It To Me" (Miguel)	–	–	–	TBA
