= Jedi Mind Tricks discography =

- Studio albums: 10
- EPs: 1
- Compilation albums: 2

This is the discography of Jedi Mind Tricks, an American underground hip hop group from Philadelphia, Pennsylvania.

== Albums ==
=== Studio albums ===
List of studio albums, with selected chart positions
Title	Album details	Peak chart positions								
Title	Album details	US	US R&B	US Rap	US Indie	US Heat.	US Taste	US Sales	SWI	UK Indie
The Psycho-Social, Chemical, Biological & Electro-Magnetic Manipulation of Human Consciousness	Released: November 4, 1997; Label: Superegular, Babygrande; Format: CD, LP, digital download	—	—	—	—	—	—	—	—	—
Violent by Design	Released: October 3, 2000; Label: Superegular, Babygrande; Format: CD, LP, digital download	—	—	—	—	—	—	—	—	—
Visions of Gandhi	Released: August 26, 2003; Label: Babygrande; Format: CD, LP, digital download	—	61	—	11	14	—	—	—	—
Legacy of Blood	Released: August 24, 2004; Label: Babygrande; Format: CD, LP, digital download	—	63	—	22	19	—	—	—	—
Servants in Heaven, Kings in Hell	Released: September 19, 2006; Label: Babygrande; Format: CD, LP, digital download	140	51	—	10	1	—	140	—	—
A History of Violence	Released: November 11, 2008; Label: Babygrande; Format: CD, LP, digital download	169	49	21	19	6	12	169	—	—
Violence Begets Violence	Released: October 25, 2011; Label: Enemy Soil, The Orchard; Format: CD, LP, digital download	103	15	9	24	1	16	103	70	—
The Thief and the Fallen	Released: June 2, 2015; Label: Enemy Soil, The Orchard; Format: CD, LP, digital download	105	11	10	11	1	10	55	60	46
The Bridge and the Abyss	Released: June 22, 2018; Label: Enemy Soil, Fat Beats; Format: CD, LP, digital download	—	—	—	18	5	—	100	76	—
The Funeral and the Raven	Released: November 19, 2021; Label: Iron Tusk Music, Fat Beats; Format: CD, LP, digital download	—	—	—	—	—	—	—	—	—

=== Compilation albums ===
Title	Album details
The Greatest Features	Released: June 23, 2009; Label: Babygrande; Format: CD, digital download
The Best of Jedi Mind Tricks	Released: December 2, 2016; Label: Babygrande; Format: CD, digital download

== Extended plays ==
Title	EP details
Amber Probe	Released: November 5, 1996; Label: Superegular; Format: LP, digital download

== Singles ==
Year	Song	Album
1999	"Heavenly Divine"	Violent by Design
2000	"Genghis Khan" (featuring Tragedy Khadafi)	Violent by Design
2001	"Retaliation"	Violent by Design
2002	"Animal Rap" (featuring Kool G Rap)	Visions of Gandhi
2002	"Kublai Khan" (featuring Tragedy Khadafi and Goretex)	Visions of Gandhi
2003	"Rise of the Machines" (featuring Ras Kass)	Visions of Gandhi
2004	"Before the Great Collapse"	Legacy of Blood
2005	"The Age of Sacred Terror"	Legacy of Blood
2006	"Heavy Metal Kings" (featuring Ill Bill)	Servants in Heaven, Kings in Hell
2011	"Target Practice"	Violence Begets Violence
2011	"When Crows Descend Upon You"	Violence Begets Violence
2018	"San La Muerte"	The Bridge and the Abyss
2018	"Marciano's Reign"	The Bridge and the Abyss
2018	"Certified Dope"	The Bridge and the Abyss
2018	"You Have One Devil But Five Angels"	The Bridge and the Abyss
