= List of Army of the Pharaohs members =

Army of the Pharaohs
- Origin: Philadelphia, Pennsylvania, U.S.

Army of the Pharaohs (most commonly abbreviated as AOTP or A.O.T.P.) is a hip hop supergroup originating from Philadelphia, Pennsylvania, formed by Vinnie Paz in 1998. The group has strong links to other underground groups such as Jedi Mind Tricks, OuterSpace, Demigodz, La Coka Nostra, JuJu Mob, Official Pistol Gang, and Snowgoons. It has changed several times ever since its formation.

== Members ==
=== Original formation ===
- Vinnie Paz (1998–present)
- Bahamadia (1998–1999)
- Chief Kamachi (1998–2007)
- Virtuoso (1998–2003)
- Esoteric (1998–present)
- 7L (1998–2006)
- Stoupe the Enemy of Mankind (1998–1999)

=== Resurrection ===
- Crypt the Warchild (2001–present)
- Planetary (2001–present)
- Celph Titled (2001–present)
- Reef the Lost Cauze (2001–present)
- King Syze (2001–present)
- Des Devious (2001–2015)
- Apathy (2001–present)

=== More additions and returns ===
- Faez One (2001–2006)
- Doap Nixon (2006–2020)
- Demoz (2006–present)
- King Magnetic (2006–2020)
- Jus Allah (2007–2010)
- Journalist (2009–2010)

=== Even more additions ===
- Block McCloud (2010–present)
- Blacastan (2011–2022 (deceased))
- Zilla (2011–present)
- Lawrence Arnell (2013-present)

== See also ==
- Army of the Pharaohs
