= Necronomicon (The Devil'z Rejects album) =

Studio album by The Devil'z Rejects
- Released: 2006
- Genre: Hip hop
- Label: Dynasty Muzik
- Producers: Kingston; Snowgoons; Slip Wax; Zach Johnson; Reel Drama; NME-Rek

Jus Allah chronology
All Fates Have Changed (2005)	Necronomicon (2006)	The Colossus (2008)

Professional ratings
Review scores
Source	Rating
Music-Reviewer.com	8/10 stars

Necronomicon is a 2006 album by The Devil'z Rejects, a duo consisting of Jedi Mind Tricks member Jus Allah and Boston rapper Bomshot. The album was allegedly released without the knowledge of Jus Allah and many of the album's contributors. The album features production from Kingston of Blue Sky Black Death and Snowgoons, and guest appearances from GZA, U-God, Snacky Chan, Chief Kamachi, Shabazz the Disciple and Virtuoso. The album received moderately positive reviews, due to the production and Jus' vocals. Necronomicon received little attention, but sold moderately well online, reaching the top 10 on the bestsellers list for both January and February 2007.

Tracks 23-26 are bonus tracks featured on the Limited Edition re-release.

== Track listing ==
#	Title	Producer(s)	Performer (s)
1	"Intro"		Interlude
2	"5 Pillars"	Reel Drama	Jus Allah, Singapore Kane, Bomshot
3	"Riddle of the Sphinx"	Snowgoons	Jus Allah, Bomshot, Ripshop
4	"Universal (A.L.L.A.H.)"	Bomshot	Bomshot, Jus Allah, GZA
5	"The Devil'z Rejects"	Kingston	Interlude
6	"Deadly"	Slip Wax	Virtuoso, Bomshot, Jus Allah
7	"U-God Interlude"	Bomshot	Interlude
8	"Incredibles"	Snowgoons	Quite Nyce, Se7en, Bomshot, Jus Allah
9	"The Da Vinci Code"	NME-Rek	Bomshot, Jus Allah, Evil Dead
10	"Spirit World"	Zach Johnson	Interlude
11	"Vengeance"	Kingston	Jus Allah, Bomshot, GZA, Chan
12	"Blood Aflow"	Kingston	Jus Allah, Bomshot, Maculate
13	"Drill Sgts"	Kingston	Jus Allah, Bomshot
14	"Chop Ya Head Off"	Slip Wax	Jus Allah, Bomshot, T-Ruckus
15	"Seance"	Kingston	Interlude
16	"Arabic Terrorists"	NME-Rek	Jus Allah, Bomshot, Evil Dead
17	"Dead Man Walking"	Snowgoons	Jus Allah, Bomshot
18	"Apocalypse Now"	Slip Wax	Bomshot, Jus Allah, Konflikk
19	"Black Godz (Remix)"	Kingston	Jus Allah, Chief Kamachi, Bomshot
20	"Tsunami"	Zach Johnson	Interlude
21	"To All (Remix)"	Kingston	Jus Allah
22	"Outro"		Interlude
23	"Eyes of the Disciple (Remix)"	Notarikon	Bomshot, Jus Allah, Shabazz the Disciple
24	"Necronomicon (Book of the Dead)"	I.D.E. Beats	Interlude
25	"Sanctuary"	Bomshot	Jus Allah, Bomshot
26	"Casket"	Kingston	Instrumental
