= The Thief and the Fallen =

Studio album by Jedi Mind Tricks
- Released: June 2, 2015
- Recorded: 2014–15
- Studio: Badtape Music
- Genres: Conscious hip-hop; underground hip-hop
- Length: 42:46
- Label: Enemy Soil
- Producer: Stoupe the Enemy of Mankind

Jedi Mind Tricks chronology
Violence Begets Violence (2011)	The Thief and the Fallen (2015)	The Bridge and the Abyss (2018)

Singles from The Thief and the Fallen
- 1. "Deathless Light" Released: May 6, 2015; 2. "Fraudulent Cloth" Released: 2015

Professional ratings
Review scores
Source	Rating
AllMusic	3.5/5 stars
RapReviews	7.5/10

The Thief and the Fallen is the eighth studio album by American Philadelphia-based underground hip-hop duo Jedi Mind Tricks. It was released on June 2, 2015 through Enemy Soil Entertainment. Production was handled entirely by Stoupe the Enemy of Mankind, who had left the band before their 2011 album Violence Begets Violence. It features guest appearances from Yes Alexander, Eamon, A-F-R-O, Dilated Peoples, Lawrence Arnell, R.A. the Rugged Man and Thea Alana. The album peaked at number 105 on the Billboard 200, at number 11 on both Top R&B/Hip-Hop Albums and Independent Albums charts, at number 10 on both Top Rap Albums and Tastemakers charts, and at number one on the Heatseekers Albums chart in the United States.

== Background ==
In March 2015, Jedi Mind Tricks founders Vinnie Paz and Stoupe the Enemy of Mankind announced they had reunited to make their first album together since 2008's A History of Violence. Former member Jus Allah, who rejoined the group in 2006 but then left again in 2013, did not appear on the album, making it the first Jedi Mind Tricks album in which he did not appear since 2006's Servants in Heaven, Kings in Hell. On May 6, 2015, the duo released a single and music video for "Deathless Light", along with a release date and cover art. Vinnie Paz's lyrics on the album were partly inspired by the written works of British author Clive Barker. The album cover was designed by Andrew Haines, and was intended to be unlike other hip-hop albums.

== Track listing ==
No.	Title	Writer(s)	Length
1.	"Intro"	Kevin Baldwin	0:31
2.	"Poison in the Birth Water"	Vincenzo Luvineri; Baldwin	2:55
3.	"Rival the Eminent" (featuring Lawrence Arnell)	Luvineri; Baldwin; Lawrence MacMillan	3:09
4.	"Hell's Messenger"	Luvineri; Baldwin	2:56
5.	"Merchant of War"	Luvineri; Baldwin	2:41
6.	"La Montagna del Dio Cannibale (Interlude)" (featuring Yes Alexander)	Baldwin; Yes Alexander; Ish Quintero	1:18
7.	"Fraudulent Cloth" (featuring Eamon)	Luvineri; Baldwin; Eamon J. Doyle; Albano Carrisi; Alessandro Colombini	4:11
8.	"And God Said to Cain" (featuring A-F-R-O, R.A. the Rugged Man and Eamon)	Luvineri; Baldwin; James Gutierrez; R.A. Thorburn; Doyle	3:38
9.	"Destiny Forged in Blood"	Luvineri; Baldwin	2:19
10.	"Il Tuo Wizio e una Stanza Chiusa e Solo Io Ne Ho la Chiave (Interlude)" (featuring Yes Alexander)	Baldwin; Alexander	1:01
11.	"Deathless Light"	Luvineri; Baldwin; Brian Profilio; Thomas Brenneck; Daniel Foder, Jr.; Jared Tankel; Andrew Greene; Mike Deller	2:42
12.	"No Jesus, No Beast"	Luvineri; Baldwin	2:28
13.	"The Kingdom That Worshipped the Dead" (featuring Dilated Peoples)	Luvineri; Baldwin; Michael Perretta; Rakaa Taylor	3:36
14.	"The God Supreme"	Luvineri; Baldwin; Mario Collazo; Craig Lanciani	3:10
15.	"In the Coldness of a Dream" (featuring Thea Alana)	Luvineri; Baldwin; Thea Alana Finstad; Quintero	3:19
16.	"Lemarchand's Box" (featuring Yes Alexander)	Luvineri; Baldwin; Alexander	2:52
Total length:			42:46

Sample credits

- Track 7 contains a sample of "Io Di Notte" written by Albano Carrisi and Alessandro Colombini
- Track 11 contains a sample of "Aphasia" written and performed by The Budos Band

== Charts ==
Chart (2015)	Peak position
Swiss Albums (Schweizer Hitparade)	60
UK Independent Albums (Official Charts)	46
US Billboard 200	105
US Top R&B/Hip-Hop Albums (Billboard)	11
US Top Rap Albums (Billboard)	10
US Independent Albums (Billboard)	11
US Heatseekers Albums (Billboard)	1
US Indie Store Album Sales (Billboard)	10
