= A Bright Cold Day =

Studio album by Dutch
- Released: June 8, 2010
- Genre: Trip Hop
- Length: 42:26
- Label: Enemy Soil
- Producer: Stoupe the Enemy of Mankind, Scott Stallone

Professional ratings
Review scores
Source	Rating
AllMusic	4/5 stars
Inyourspeakers.com	7/10 stars
Trippintherift.com	4/5 stars
Verbicide Magazine	(favorable)

A Bright Cold Day is the debut album by American trip hop duo Dutch, which consists of Jedi Mind Tricks producer Stoupe the Enemy of Mankind and singer Liz Fullerton. The album was released on June 8, 2010 under Enemy Soil.

== Track listing ==
Source: HipHopUG

No.	Title	Length
1.	"Intro"	0:37
2.	"Just Before The Rain"	3:59
3.	"Pearls"	4:46
4.	"2000 Leagues Under My Keyboard"	4:27
5.	"Warm Like The Wind"	3:37
6.	"Charlotte"	2:45
7.	"California Cloaked In Wool"	4:03
8.	"Tristessa"	3:52
9.	"Cerulean"	4:28
10.	"Beyond All Walking"	4:17
11.	"Meaning Of Unequipped"	3:32
12.	"Shoe (Outro)"	2:05
