= The Torture Papers (album) =

Studio album by Army of the Pharaohs
- Released: March 21, 2006
- Genre: Hardcore hip-hop
- Length: 51:30
- Label: Babygrande
- Producer: 7L; Apathy; Beyonder; DC The MIDI Alien; Loptimist; Oaks; Rain; Shuko; The White Shadow; Undefined; Villa

Army of the Pharaohs chronology
The Torture Papers (2006)	Ritual of Battle (2007)

Singles from The Torture Papers
- 1. "Tear It Down / Battle Cry" Released: 2006

Professional ratings
Review scores
Source	Rating
AllMusic	2.5/5 stars
HipHopDX	3.5/5
PopMatters	5/10
RapReviews	8.5/10

The Torture Papers is the debut studio album by American underground hip-hop collective Army of the Pharaohs. It was released on March 21, 2006 via Babygrande Records. Produced by 7L, DC The MIDI Alien, Shuko, Apathy, Beyonder, Loptimist, Oaks, Rain, The White Shadow, Undefined and Villa, it features contributions from Apathy, Celph Titled, Chief Kamachi, Crypt the Warchild, Des Devious, Esoteric, Faez One, King Syze, Planetary, Reef the Lost Cauze and Vinnie Paz.

The album debuted at number 42 on the Heatseekers Albums and number 48 on the Independent Albums charts in the United States.

== Background ==
The crew was established in 1998 by Jedi Mind Tricks frontman Vinnie Paz, and originally featured Jedi Mind Tricks, Chief Kamachi, 7L & Esoteric, Virtuoso and Bahamadia. Virtuoso and Bahamadia later split from the group, which now consists of Paz, Kamachi, 7L & Esoteric, Apathy, OuterSpace, King Syze, Reef the Lost Cauze, Des Devious, Celph Titled and Faez One. An Army of the Pharaohs collaboration album was rumored to be in the works for years, but was often delayed due to separate projects and internal problems, however a mixtape titled After Torture There's Pain was released in 2007.

== Track listing ==
No.	Title	Writer(s)	Producer(s)	Length
1.	"Battle Cry"	Chad Bromley; Daniel Albaladejo; Marcus Albaladejo; David Edens; Seamus Ryan; Edward Littlepage; Mario Collazo; Vic Mercer; Vincenzo Luvineri; Christoph Bauss	Shuko	6:06
2.	"Gorillas"	M. Albaladejo; Ryan; Bromley; Collazo; Darryl Christy	DC The MIDI Alien	3:30
3.	"Henry the 8th"	Luvineri; Littlepage; Sharif Lacey; Collazo; M. Henzey	Undefined	3:39
4.	"Pull the Pins Out"	Mercer; Ryan; Braun Dugan	Beyonder	3:36
5.	"Tear It Down"	Lacey; Collazo; Luvineri; Lee Hyeok Ki	Loptimist	3:50
6.	"Into the Arms of Angels"	Jon Hicks; M. Albaladejo; Luvineri; RJ Rixey	Rain	5:05
7.	"The Torture Papers"	Mercer; Collazo; Bromley	Apathy	3:31
8.	"Listen Up"	Mercer; Ryan; M. Albaladejo; George Andrinopoulos	7L	4:02
9.	"All Shall Perish"	Littlepage; D. Albaladejo; Luvineri; Bauss	Shuko	4:13
10.	"Wrath of Gods"	Bromley; Ryan; Collazo; Edens; Christy	DC The MIDI Alien	3:05
11.	"Narrow Grave"	Littlepage; D. Albaladejo; Collazo; Tage Slettemoen	The White Shadow; Villa	3:41
12.	"Feast of the Wolves"	Luvineri; Bromley; Mercer; Oaks	Oaks; Celph Titled (add.)	3:44
13.	"King Among Kings"	Littlepage; Luvineri; Ryan; Mercer; Andrinopoulos	7L	3:28
Total length:				51:30

== Personnel ==
- Chad "Apathy" Bromley — rap vocals (tracks: 1, 2, 7, 10, 12), producer (track 7)
- Daniel "King Syze" Albaladejo — rap vocals (tracks: 1, 9, 11)
- Marcus "Crypt the Warchild" Albaladejo — rap vocals (tracks: 1, 2, 6, 8), additional vocals (track 9)
- David "Des Devious" Edens — rap vocals (tracks: 1, 10), additional vocals (tracks: 3, 11)
- Seamus "Esoteric" Ryan — rap vocals (tracks: 1, 2, 4, 8, 10, 13)
- Edward "Chief Kamachi" Littlepage — rap vocals (tracks: 1, 3, 9, 11, 13)
- Mario "Planetary" Collazo — rap vocals (tracks: 1, 2, 3, 5, 7, 10, 11)
- Vic "Celph Titled" Mercer — rap vocals (tracks: 1, 4, 7, 8, 12, 13), additional producer & mixing (track 12)
- Vincenzo "Vinnie Paz" Luviner — rap vocals (tracks: 1, 3, 5, 6, 9, 12, 13), additional vocals (tracks: 2, 8, 11), executive producer
- Sharif "Reef the Lost Cauze" Lacey — rap vocals (tracks: 3, 5)
- Jon "Faez One" Hicks — rap vocals (track 6)
- Dave "DJ Kwestion" Klein — scratches (track 5)
- Tony Perez — additional vocals (track 6)
- Christoph "Shuko" Bauss — producer (tracks: 1, 9)
- Darryl "DC The MIDI Alien" Christy — producer (tracks: 2, 10)
- M. "Undefined" Henzey — producer (track 3)
- Braun "Beyonder" Dugan — producer & mixing (track 4)
- Lee Hyeok "Loptimist" Ki — producer (track 5)
- RJ "Rain" Rixey — producer (track 6)
- George "7L" Andrinopoulos — producer (tracks: 7, 13)
- Tage "The White Shadow" Slettemoen — producer (track 11)
- Villa — producer (track 11)
- Oaks — producer (track 12)
- Scott "Supe" Stallone — recording & mixing (tracks: 1, 3, 5, 6, 8, 9, 11, 13)
- Sir Bob Nash — recording & mixing (track 2)
- Adam "Chum The Skrilla Guerilla" Mathiason — recording & mixing (track 7)
- James "DJ Chaos" McEwan — recording (tracks: 8, 10, 13), mixing (track 10)
- Dan "D-Son" Nicklin — mixing (tracks: 8, 13)
- Lewis Holiday — photography

== Charts ==
Chart (2006)	Peak position
US Independent Albums (Billboard)	48
US Heatseekers Albums (Billboard)	42
