= Virtuoso (rapper) =

- Born: Miguel Blackmer-Hart; Cambridge, Massachusetts, U.S.
- Genres: Hip hop, underground hip hop
- Occupations: Rapper, record executive
- Years active: 1998–present
- Labels: Brick Records, Omnipotent, Raptivism, Big Bang, Goon MuSick

Miguel Blackmer-Hart (born c. 1979), known professionally as Virtuoso, is an American rapper and record executive from Cambridge, Massachusetts. He is best known as a founding member of the hip hop supergroup Army of the Pharaohs and for his solo work in the Boston underground hip hop scene.

In 2002, he won the Boston Music Award for Outstanding Rap/Hip-Hop Act. He later founded the independent labels Omnipotent Records and Big Bang Records.

== Early life ==
Virtuoso was born Miguel Blackmer-Hart in Cambridge, Massachusetts. His father was a studio electronics specialist who worked in Massachusetts recording studios during the 1980s. Due to his father's profession, Blackmer-Hart was exposed to the music industry at a young age.

He attended Cambridge Rindge and Latin School, where he was a varsity baseball pitcher. His athletic career was ended by a collarbone injury sustained from a line drive while pitching. Following the injury, he focused on writing and performing hip hop music.

== Career ==
=== 1998–2003: Brick Records and Army of the Pharaohs ===
Virtuoso began performing in the late 1990s Boston battle rap circuit and appeared on the True School Thursdays radio show on WERS. In 1998, he appeared on the Brick Records compilation album Rebel Alliance and released his debut single, "Incinerator", featuring Mr. Lif and Esoteric.

He was a founding member of the Philadelphia-based collective Army of the Pharaohs, organized by Vinnie Paz of Jedi Mind Tricks. Virtuoso performed the opening verse on the group's debut 12-inch single, "The Five Perfect Exertions" (1998).

In 2001, he founded Omnipotent Records to release his debut studio album, World War I: The Voice of Reason. The album featured guest appearances from Del the Funky Homosapien and Bahamadia. In 2002, Virtuoso won the Boston Music Award for Outstanding Rap/Hip-Hop Act.

=== 2004–2010: Evolution of the Torturer ===
In 2004, Virtuoso released his second album, World War II: Evolution of the Torturer, through a partnership with Raptivism Records. The album contained political commentary regarding the War on Terror, specifically on the single "Fahrenheit 9/11" featuring Akrobatik.

He toured in support of the album, opening for acts including Hieroglyphics and the Wu-Tang Clan. In a 2016 interview, Del the Funky Homosapien noted Virtuoso as a prominent figure in the Boston hip hop scene.

=== 2011–Present: Big Bang Records and Snowgoons ===
Following a period living in Puerto Rico, Virtuoso returned to Cambridge and founded Big Bang Records with partner Brian Shirley. He established a collaborative partnership with the rap duo N.B.S. (Natural Born Spitters; consisting of E-Flash and V-Knuckles), to release music and tour as a collective.

Virtuoso frequently collaborates with the German production team Snowgoons. In 2013, they released a collaborative studio album titled CoVirt Ops: Infantry via Goon MuSick and Big Bang Records. The album received positive coverage from genre publications and featured appearances from Reks and Slaine.

== Discography ==
=== Studio albums ===
- World War I: The Voice of Reason (2001, Omnipotent)
- World War II: Evolution of the Torturer (2004, Omnipotent/Raptivism)
- The Final Conflict (2011, Big Bang)

=== Collaborative albums ===
- CoVirt Ops: Infantry (with Snowgoons) (2013, Goon MuSick)

== Awards ==
- 2002 Boston Music Awards: Outstanding Rap/Hip-Hop Act (Won)
