= Decalogue (album) =

Studio album by Stoupe the Enemy of Mankind
- Released: March 31, 2009
- Genre: Hip hop
- Length: 36:44
- Label: Babygrande
- Producer: Stoupe the Enemy of Mankind

Stoupe the Enemy of Mankind chronology
Decalogue (2009)	they. (2019)

Professional ratings
Review scores
Source	Rating
HipHopDX	3/5

Decalogue is the first full-length solo studio album by American hip hop record producer Stoupe the Enemy of Mankind. It was released on March 31, 2009 via Babygrande Records. Production was entirely handled by Stoupe himself, with Chuck Wilson serving as executive producer. It features guest appearances from his fellow Army of the Pharaohs groupmates Block McCloud, Demoz, Des Devious, Jus Allah, King Magnetic, OuterSpace and Reef the Lost Cauze, as well as Joell Ortiz, M.O.P., Saigon, Slaine, Supastition, and his future Vespertina bandmate Lorrie Doriza.

== Track listing ==
No.	Title	Length
1.	"Allison James" (featuring Slaine)	4:10
2.	"When the Sun Goes Down" (featuring Saigon)	3:41
3.	"Evil Deeds" (featuring Demoz, Des Devious and Jus Allah)	3:16
4.	"The Truth" (featuring Supastition)	3:12
5.	"That's Me" (featuring Joell Ortiz)	3:54
6.	"The Torch" (featuring King Magnetic and Reef the Lost Cauze)	3:48
7.	"Speakeasy" (featuring OuterSpace)	3:25
8.	"Transition of Power" (featuring M.O.P.)	3:04
9.	"Independence Day" (featuring Block McCloud)	4:07
10.	"Find a Way" (featuring Lorrie Doriza)	4:07
Total length:		36:44

== Personnel ==
- Kevin "Stoupe the Enemy of Mankind" Baldwin – main artist, producer
- George "Slaine" Carroll – featured artist (track 1)
- Brian Daniel "Saigon" Carenard – featured artist (track 2)
- Jose "Demoz" Vargas – featured artist (track 3)
- David "Des Devious" Edens – featured artist (track 3)
- James "Jus Allah" Bostick – featured artist (track 3)
- Kamaarphial "Supastition" Moye – featured artist (track 4)
- Joell Ortiz – featured artist (track 5)
- Jason "King Magnetic" Faust – featured artist (track 6)
- Sharif Talib "Reef the Lost Cauze" Lacey – featured artist (track 6)
- Marcus "Crypt the Warchild" Albaladejo – featured artist (track 7)
- Mario "Planetary" Collazo – featured artist (track 7)
- Eric "Billy Danze" Murray – featured artist (track 8)
- Jamal "Lil' Fame" Grinnage – featured artist (track 8)
- Ismael "Block McCloud" Diaz, Jr. – featured artist (track 9)
- Lorrie Doriza – featured artist (track 10)
- Charles "Chuck" Wilson, Jr. – executive producer
- Nubian Image – artwork & design
- Willy Friedman – product management
