= Prayer for the Assassin =

EP by Vinnie Paz
- Released: October 26, 2010
- Recorded: 2009–2010
- Genre: Hip-hop
- Label: Enemy Soil

Vinnie Paz chronology
| Season of the Assassin (2010) | Prayer for the Assassin (2010) | God of the Serengeti (2012) |

Prayer for the Assassin is the debut extended play by American rapper Vinnie Paz. It was released on October 26, 2010, by Enemy Soil Entertainment. The EP contains four remixed tracks from Season of the Assassin and a music video for the track "Keep Movin' On". It was only available for digital download and was released four months after his debut album.

== Track listing ==
| No. | Title | Producer(s) | Length |
|---|---|---|---|
| 1. | "Nosebleed (JBL The Titan Remix)" (featuring R.A. the Rugged Man) | JBL The Titan | 3:15 |
| 2. | "Pistolvania (Shuko Remix)" (featuring Freeway & Jakk Frost) | Shuko | 4:02 |
| 3. | "Brick Wall (Nero Remx)" (featuring Ill Bill and Demoz) | Nero | 4:24 |
| 4. | "Drag You To Hell (DJ Brans Remix)" | DJ Brans | 3:46 |
| 5. | "Keep Movin’ On (video)" (featuring Shara Worden) | MoSS | 3:59 |
