= Ritual of Battle =

Studio album by Army of the Pharaohs
- Released: September 25, 2007
- Studios: Found Sound Recording (Philadelphia, PA)
- Genre: Hardcore hip-hop
- Label: Babygrande
- Producers: Aktone; Beyonder; Celph Titled; DJ Kwestion; Esoteric; Ill Bill; JBL The Titan; Sicknature; Skammadix; Vanderslice

Army of the Pharaohs chronology
The Torture Papers (2006)	Ritual of Battle (2007)	The Unholy Terror (2010)

Professional ratings
Review scores
Source	Rating
Drowned in Sound	7/10
HipHopDX	3/5
PopMatters	7/10
RapReviews	8.5/10

Ritual of Battle is the second studio album by American underground hip-hop collective Army of the Pharaohs. It was released on September 25, 2007 via Babygrande Records. Production was handled by Aktone, Esoteric, DJ Kwestion, Ill Bill, Sicknature, Beyonder, Celph Titled, JBL The Titan, Skammadix and Vanderslice.

The album marks the final appearance by Chief Kamachi and welcomes three new members: Demoz, Doap Nixon and King Magnetic. Jedi Mind Tricks member Jus Allah was featured on three tracks despite not being introduced as an official member. Although he prominently contributed to the group's debut, Apathy does not appear on Ritual of Battle. While still a member of the group, he explains on a MySpace blog that he was recording with Styles of Beyond in Los Angeles during the Army's album recording sessions. The rapper recorded for the Snowgoons-produced song titled "A.O.T.P.", which ended up not being included the final cut. However, it was included on the Apathy's Hell's Lost & Found: It's the Bootleg, Muthafuckas! Volume 2 compilation.

== Track listing ==
No.	Title	Writer(s)	Producer(s)	Length
1.	"Swords Drawn"	Edward Littlepage; Jose Vargas; Mario Collazo; Seamus Ryan; Sharif Lacey; Vic Mercer	Esoteric	4:09
2.	"Time to Rock"	Mercer; Vargas; Vincenzo Luviner	Celph Titled	3:48
3.	"Dump the Clip"	Collazo; Ryan; Mercer	Esoteric	2:46
4.	"Black Christmas"	Collazo; Kenneth Greene; David Edens; Vargas; Jason Faust; Luviner; Paco Urquieta	Aktone	5:23
5.	"Blue Steel"	Luviner; James Bostick; Eric Vanderslice	Vanderslice	2:41
6.	"Gun Ballad"	Littlepage; Vargas; Luviner; Greene; William Braunstein	Ill Bill; Sicknature	3:53
7.	"Strike Back"	Collazo; Vargas; Daniel Albaladejo; Ryan; Luviner; Dave Klein	DJ Kwestion	4:15
8.	"Frontline"	Greene; Luviner; Collazo; D. Albaladejo; Vargas; Urquieta	Aktone	4:20
9.	"Through Blood by Thunder"	Littlepage; Marcus Albaladejo; Vargas; Luviner; Bostick; Kris Rey	Skammadix	3:45
10.	"Murda Murda"	M. Albaladejo; Edens; Mercer; Ryan	Esoteric	3:41
11.	"Bloody Tears"	Collazo; Greene; Vargas; Luviner; Klein	DJ Kwestion	4:36
12.	"Seven"	Collazo; Littlepage; D. Albaladejo; Lacey; Greene; Vargas; Mercer; Luviner; Braunstein	Ill Bill; Sicknature	6:14
13.	"Drama Theme"	Bostick; Littlepage; Luviner; Greene; Mercer; Faust; Vargas; Urquieta	Aktone	6:15
14.	"Pages in Blood"	Luviner; Vargas; Littlepage; Braun Dugan	Beyonder	3:59
15.	"D and D"	Edens; Vargas; Urquieta	Aktone	1:59
16.	"Don't Cry"	Greene; Collazo; Vargas; Luviner; J. Ibarra	JBL The Titan	4:42

== Personnel ==
- Jose "Demoz" Vargas – vocals (tracks: 1, 2, 4, 6-9, 11-16)
- Vincenzo "Vinnie Paz" Luvineri – vocals (tracks: 2, 4-9, 11-14, 16), executive producer
- Mario "Planetary" Collazo – vocals (tracks: 1, 3, 4, 7, 8, 11, 12, 16)
- Kenneth "Doap Nixon" Greene – vocals (tracks: 4, 6, 8, 11-13, 16)
- Vic "Celph Titled" Mercer – vocals (tracks: 1-3, 10, 12, 13), producer (track 2), mixing (tracks: 1-3, 10), vocal recording (tracks: 3, 10), additional vocal recording (tracks: 1, 2)
- Edward "Chief Kamachi" Littlepage – vocals (tracks: 1, 6, 9, 12-14)
- Seamus "Esoteric" Ryan – vocals (tracks: 1, 3, 7), producer (tracks: 1, 3, 10), vocal recording (tracks: 3, 7), additional vocal recording (track 1)
- David "Des Devious" Edens – vocals (tracks: 4, 10, 15)
- James "Jus Allah" Bostick – vocals (tracks: 5, 9, 13)
- Daniel "King Syze" Albaladejo – vocals (tracks: 7, 8, 12)
- Sharif "Reef the Lost Cauze" Lacey – vocals (tracks: 1, 12)
- Jason "King Magnetic" Faust – vocals (tracks: 4, 13)
- Marcus "Crypt the Warchild" Albaladejo – vocals (tracks: 9, 10)
- Paco "Aktone" Urquieta – producer (tracks: 4, 8, 13, 15)
- William "Ill Bill" Braunstein – producer & mixing (tracks: 6, 12)
- Sicknature – producer (tracks: 6, 12)
- Dave "DJ Kwestion" Klein – producer (tracks: 7, 11), scratches (track 5)
- Eric Vanderslice – producer (track 5)
- Kris "Skammadix" Rey – producer (track 9)
- Braun "Beyonder" Dugan – producer (track 14)
- J. "JBL The Titan" Ibarra – producer (track 16)
- Scott "Supe" Stallone – recording, mixing (tracks: 4, 5, 7-9, 11, 13-16)
- Carlos "C-12" Bess – mixing (tracks: 6, 12)
