= All Fates Have Changed =

Studio album by Jus Allah
- Released: May 10, 2005
- Genre: Hip hop
- Length: 1:09:57
- Label: Babygrande
- Producer: Agallah; Zach Johnson; NME-REK; Slipwax; Kingston; Ray Fernandes; Virtuoso; Mr. Burns; Panik

Jus Allah chronology
All Fates Have Changed (2005)	MMA (Meanest Man Alive) (2015)

Singles from All Fates Have Changed
- 1. "Pool of Blood / Hell Razors" Released: 2005; 2. "G-O-D / Supreme" Released: 2005

Professional ratings
Review scores
Source	Rating
AllHipHop	3/5
RapReviews	6.5/10

All Fates Have Changed is the debut solo studio album by American underground rapper Jus Allah. It was released on May 10, 2005, via Babygrande Records. Production was handled by Agallah, Zach Johnson, NME-REK, Slipwax, Kingston, Ray Fernandes, Virtuoso, Mr. Burns and Panik, with Chuck Wilson serving as executive producer. It features guest appearances from Bomshot, Evil Dead, Agallah, Chief Kamachi, GZA, Lord Jamar, Shabazz the Disciple, T-Ruckus and Virtuoso. The album spawned two singles: "Pool of Blood" b/w "Hell Razors" and "G-O-D" b/w "Supreme".

The album came five years after his recording debut, on Jedi Mind Tricks' Violent by Design. The last five tracks on the album are all previously released 'Bonus Tracks & Alternate Mixes'. "White Nightmare" and "Reign of the Lord" were originally released on Jus Allah's 2002 "White Nightmare" single, "Severed and Split" and "Chess King" were both featured on the Omnipotent Records compilation Era of the Titans, and "Divide & Conquer", produced by Molemen member Panik, was featured on the Molemen 2005 compilation Lost Sessions.

== Track listing ==
No.	Title	Writer(s)	Producer(s)	Length
1.	"This Is for Y'all"	James Bostick; Angel Aguilar	Agallah	4:10
2.	"Hell Razors" (featuring Evil Dead)	Bostick; C. Lemieux; Brian Brown	NME-REK	3:37
3.	"Supreme"	Bostick; Aguilar	Agallah	4:14
4.	"Pool of Blood" (featuring GZA)	Bostick; Gary Grice; Zach Johnson	Zach Johnson	3:17
5.	"Tomorrow"	Bostick; Aguilar	Agallah	3:41
6.	"Eyes of a Disciple" (featuring Bomshot and Shabazz the Disciple)	Bostick; Richard Willey; David Collins; Johnson	Zach Johnson	3:04
7.	"Trust (Interlude)"		Slipwax	0:38
8.	"Important Shit" (featuring Lord Jamar and Agallah)	Bostick; Lorenzo DeChalus; Aguilar	Agallah	4:04
9.	"Porno Flick Bitches" (featuring Evil Dead)	Bostick; Lemieux; Brown	NME-REK	3:05
10.	"Can't Sleep"	Bostick; Aguilar	Agallah	3:55
11.	"Supreme (Black God's Remix)" (featuring Chief Kamachi and Bomshot)	Bostick; Edward Littlepage; Willey; Ryan Maguire	Kingston	5:07
12.	"G-O-D"	Bostick; Aguilar	Agallah	4:10
13.	"Betrayal (Interlude)"		Slipwax	0:52
14.	"Divide & Conquer"	Bostick; Edward Zamudio	Panik	4:45
15.	"Reign of the Lord"	Bostick; Johnson	Zach Johnson	5:20
16.	"Chess King"	Bostick; Ray Fernandes; Miguel Blackmer-Hart	Ray Fernandes; Virtuoso	4:53
17.	"White Nightmare"	Bostick; Julian Krishnamurti	Mr. Burns	5:02
18.	"Severed and Split" (featuring Bomshot, T-Ruckus and Virtuoso)	Bostick; Willey; T. Powell; Blackmer-Hart; Fernandes	Ray Fernandes; Virtuoso	6:03
Total length:				1:09:57

== Personnel ==
- James "Jus Allah" Bostick – vocals
- C. "Rhetoric" Lemieux – vocals (tracks: 2, 9)
- Gary "GZA" Grice – vocals (track 4)
- Richard "Bomshot" Willey – vocals (tracks: 6, 11, 18)
- David "Shabazz the Disciple" Collins – vocals (track 6)
- Lorenzo "Lord Jamar" DeChalus – vocals (track 8)
- Angel "Agallah" Aguilar – vocals (track 8), producer (tracks: 1, 3, 5, 8, 10, 12)
- Edward "Chief Kamachi" Littlepage – vocals (track 11)
- T. "T-Ruckus" Powell – vocals (track 18)
- Miguel "Virtuoso" Blackmer-Hart – vocals (track 18), producer (tracks: 16, 18)
- Brian "NME-REK" Brown – producer (tracks: 2, 9)
- Zach Johnson – producer (tracks: 4, 6, 15)
- DJ Slipwax – producer (tracks: 7, 13)
- Ryan "Kingston" Maguire – producer (track 11)
- Edward "Panik" Zamudio – producer (track 14)
- Ray Fernandes – producer (tracks: 16, 18)
- Julian "Mr. Burns" Krishnamurti – producer (track 17)
- Chris Conway – recording, mixing
- Emily Lazar – mastering
- Chuck Wilson – executive producer, A&R
- Nubian Image – art direction, design
- Greg Davis – layout
- Adam Raymond – A&R publicity
- Jill Shehebar – management
- Jesse Stone – marketing
