= Visions of Gandhi =

Studio album by Jedi Mind Tricks
- Released: August 26, 2003
- Genre: Hip-hop
- Length: 1:03:25
- Label: Babygrande
- Producer: Stoupe the Enemy of Mankind

Jedi Mind Tricks chronology
Violent by Design (2000)	Visions of Gandhi (2003)	Legacy of Blood (2004)

Singles from Visions of Gandhi
- 1. "Animal Rap" Released: 2002; 2. "Kublai Khan" Released: 2002; 3. "Rise of the Machines" Released: 2003

Professional ratings
Review scores
Source	Rating
AllHipHop	4.5/5 stars
AllMusic	2.5/5 stars
laut.de	4/5 stars
Pitchfork	4.9/10
RapReviews	9/10
The Village Voice	(3-star Honorable Mention)

Visions of Gandhi is the third studio album by American hip-hop group Jedi Mind Tricks. It was released on August 26, 2003 via Babygrande Records. Production was handled by member Stoupe the Enemy of Mankind, who expands his dark sounds, including beats with grand orchestral samples and Latin-tinged production. Member Vinnie Paz lessens his lyrical topics to focus on his thug persona and member Jus Allah split from the group after the release of their 2000 album Violent by Design. It features guest appearances from Canibus, Crypt the Warchild, Goretex, Ill Bill, Kool G Rap, Percee P, Planetary, Ras Kass, Rocky Raez, Sabac Red and Tragedy Khadafi.

The album peaked at number 61 on the Top R&B/Hip-Hop Albums, number 11 on the Independent Albums and number 14 on the Heatseekers Albums charts in the United States.

== Title significance ==
The album title was inspired by Foxy Brown's verse on the song "Affirmative Action" from Nas' 1996 album It Was Written, in which she raps "They praise Allah with visions of Gandhi". Vinnie Paz explained that it was "always something that stuck in my head but I never applied it to anything. Then I thought with everything going on in Palestine, the war with Iraq, Mumia's in jail. I just felt this is a time right now that the world and society need someone like Gandhi. So Visions of Gandhi just kind of reflects that".

== Track listing ==
No.	Title	Writer(s)	Length
1.	"Intro"		1:06
2.	"Tibetan Black Magicians" (featuring Canibus)	Vincenzo Luvineri; Germaine Williams; Kevin Baldwin	4:50
3.	"Blood in Blood Out"	Luvineri; Baldwin	4:06
4.	"The Rage of Angels" (featuring Crypt the Warchild)	Luvineri; Marcus Albaladejo; Baldwin	3:22
5.	"Demonwomb Interlude"		0:37
6.	"Animal Rap" (featuring Kool G Rap)	Luvineri; Nathaniel Wilson; Baldwin	3:39
7.	"Nada Cambia"	Luvineri; Baldwin	4:58
8.	"A Storm of Swords" (featuring Planetary)	Luvineri; Mario Collazo; Baldwin	4:00
9.	"Boondock Saints Interlude"		0:37
10.	"The Wolf" (featuring Ill Bill and Sabac Red)	Luvineri; William Braunstein; John Fuentes; Baldwin	3:45
11.	"Walk With Me" (featuring Percee P)	Luvineri; John Percy Simon; Baldwin	3:26
12.	"Rise of the Machines" (featuring Ras Kass)	Luvineri; John Austin; Baldwin	2:50
13.	"Pity of War Interlude"		1:14
14.	"Kublai Khan" (featuring Tragedy Khadafi and Goretex)	Luvineri; Percy Chapman; Mitchell Manzanilla; Baldwin	3:37
15.	"What's Really Good" (featuring Rocky Raez)	Luvineri; L. Raez; Baldwin	3:32
16.	"The Heart of Darkness (Interlude)"		0:52
17.	"Raw Is War 2003"	Luvineri; Baldwin	17:04
Total length:			1:03:25

== Charts ==
Chart (2003)	Peak position
US Top R&B/Hip-Hop Albums (Billboard)	61
US Independent Albums (Billboard)	11
US Heatseekers Albums (Billboard)	14
