= The Bridge and the Abyss =

The Bridge & the Abyss

Studio album by Jedi Mind Tricks
- Released: June 22, 2018
- Genre: Hip-hop
- Length: 57:12
- Label: Enemy Soil
- Producer: Stoupe the Enemy of Mankind; C-Lance (co.); Aaron Hiltz (co.); Scott "Supe" Stallone (co.)

Jedi Mind Tricks chronology
The Thief and the Fallen (2015)	The Bridge & the Abyss (2018)	The Funeral and the Raven (2021)

Professional ratings
Review scores
Source	Rating
Medium	8/10

The Bridge and the Abyss is the ninth studio album by American hip-hop duo Jedi Mind Tricks. It was released on June 22, 2018, via Enemy Soil Entertainment. Production was handled entirely by member Stoupe the Enemy of Mankind, with co-producers C-Lance, Aaron Hiltz and Scott "Supe" Stallone. It features guest appearances from Yes Alexander, Czarface, Eamon, Scott Stallone, Thea Alana and the late Sean Price.

The album debuted at number 100 on the Top Album Sales, number 74 on the Top Current Album Sales, number 18 on the Independent Albums and number 5 on the Heatseekers Albums charts in the United States and number 76 on the Swiss Hitparade.

== Track listing ==
No.	Title	Writer(s)	Producer(s)	Length
1.	"Al Bid-Aya" (featuring Yes Alexander)	Lindsay M. Alexander; Kevin Baldwin; Craig Lanciani	Stoupe the Enemy of Mankind; C-Lance (co.)	1:36
2.	"San La Muerte"	Vincenzo Luviner; Baldwin; Lanciani; Eamon J. Doyle	Stoupe the Enemy of Mankind; C-Lance (co.)	3:07
3.	"Rashindun Caliphate"	Luviner; Baldwin	Stoupe the Enemy of Mankind	3:29
4.	"Freshco & Miz"	Luviner; Baldwin	Stoupe the Enemy of Mankind	2:53
5.	"When the Body Goes Cold"	Luviner; Baldwin; Lanciani; Aaron Hiltz; Doyle	Stoupe the Enemy of Mankind; C-Lance (co.); Aaron Hiltz (co.)	4:32
6.	"What She Left Behind"	Luviner; Baldwin; André Maruani; Guy Maruani	Stoupe the Enemy of Mankind	4:58
7.	"Death Toll Rising"	Luviner; Baldwin; Lanciani	Stoupe the Enemy of Mankind; C-Lance (co.)	2:59
8.	"Shed the Skin to Receive the World (Interlude)" (featuring Yes Alexander)	Alexander; Baldwin	Stoupe the Enemy of Mankind	1:32
9.	"Certified Dope" (featuring Eamon)	Luviner; Doyle; Baldwin; The Panicks	Stoupe the Enemy of Mankind	2:27
10.	"Hell's Henchman"	Luviner; Baldwin; Lanciani; Hiltz; Doyle	Stoupe the Enemy of Mankind; C-Lance (co.); Aaron Hiltz (co.)	3:38
11.	"God Forsaken"	Luviner; Baldwin; Lanciani; Doyle	Stoupe the Enemy of Mankind; C-Lance (co.)	3:04
12.	"Legacy of the Prophet" (featuring Sean Price)	Luviner; Sean Price; Baldwin; Lanciani	Stoupe the Enemy of Mankind; C-Lance (co.)	2:57
13.	"Void Ritual (Interlude)" (featuring Yes Alexander)	Alexander; Baldwin	Stoupe the Enemy of Mankind	1:05
14.	"You Have One Devil but Five Angels"	Luviner; Baldwin; Lanciani; Hiltz	Stoupe the Enemy of Mankind; C-Lance (co.); Aaron Hiltz (co.)	3:39
15.	"Marciano's Reign" (featuring Scott "Supe" Stallone)	Luviner; Scott Stalone; Baldwin	Stoupe the Enemy of Mankind; Scott "Supe" Stallone (co.)	3:08
16.	"Torture Chamber" (featuring Czarface)	Luviner; Jason Hunter; Seamus Ryan; Baldwin; Lanciani	Stoupe the Enemy of Mankind; C-Lance (co.)	4:04
17.	"The Letter Concerning the Intellect"	Luviner; Baldwin; Darío Gianella	Stoupe the Enemy of Mankind	2:33
18.	"Making a Killing" (featuring Thea Alana)	Luviner; Thea Finstad; Baldwin; Lanciani; Hiltz; Stalone	Stoupe the Enemy of Mankind; C-Lance (co.); Aaron Hiltz (co.); Scott "Supe" Stallone (co.)	4:16
19.	"What Falls Is Fallen (Interlude)" (featuring Yes Alexander)	Alexander; Baldwin	Stoupe the Enemy of Mankind	1:15
Total length:				57:12

Sample credits

- Track 6 contains portions of "Such a Lovely Voice" performed by Classical M.
- Track 9 contains portions of "Treat Me Right" performed by The Panicks.
- Track 17 contains portions of "Tranquila Reflexion" performed by Tarkus.

== Personnel ==
- Vincenzo "Vinnie Paz" Luvineri – vocals (tracks: 2–7, 9–12, 14–18)
- Lindsay "Yes" Alexander – vocals (tracks: 1, 8, 13, 19)
- Eamon Jonathan Doyle – vocals (track 9)
- Sean Price – vocals (track 12)
- Jason "Inspectah Deck" Hunter – vocals (track 16)
- Seamus "Esoteric" Ryan – vocals & scratches (track 16)
- Thea Kristine Alana Finstad – vocals (track 18)
- Ismael "Ish" Quintero – backing vocals (track 5), guitar (tracks: 2, 4, 5, 9, 10, 14), organ (track 2), bass (track 7), piano & synth (track 5), horns (track 10), scratches (track 14)
- Craig "C-Lance" Lanciani – piano (tracks: 3, 14, 16), guitar (tracks: 14, 16), bass (track 14), co-producer (tracks: 1, 2, 5, 7, 10–12, 14, 16, 18)
- Aaron Hiltz – organ (tracks: 5, 14), strings & horns (track 5), flute (tracks: 10, 14), cello (track 10), piano & upright bass (track 14), co-producer (tracks: 5, 10, 14, 18)
- Z. Gillespie – violin (track 12)
- Dave "DJ Kwestion" Klein – scratches (track 12)
- The Czar-Keys – organ & bass (track 16)
- Kevin "Stoupe the Enemy of Mankind" Baldwin – producer
- Scott "Supe" Stallone – co-producer (tracks: 15, 18), mixing
- Peter Humphreys – mastering
- Andrew Haines – illustration
- Dan Bradley – design, layout

== Charts ==
Chart (2018)	Peak position
Swiss Albums (Schweizer Hitparade)	76
US Top Album Sales (Billboard)	100
US Top Current Album Sales (Billboard)	74
US Independent Albums (Billboard)	18
US Heatseekers Albums (Billboard)	5
