= The Unholy Terror =

Studio album by Army of the Pharaohs
- Released: March 30, 2010
- Studio: Found Sound Recording (Philadelphia, PA)
- Genre: Hardcore hip-hop; horrorcore
- Length: 1:10:40
- Label: Enemy Soil; Babygrande
- Producer: Aktone; Apathy; Celph Titled; Crown; DC the Midi Alien; DJ Kwestion; Grand Finale; Hypnotist Beats; JBL the Titan; MTK; Triple Z; Undefined; Vanderslice

Army of the Pharaohs chronology
Ritual of Battle (2007)	The Unholy Terror (2010)	In Death Reborn (2014)

Professional ratings
Review scores
Source	Rating
AllMusic	4/5 stars
HipHopDX	3.5/5
RapReviews	5.5/10

The Unholy Terror is the third studio album by American hardcore hip-hop collective Army of the Pharaohs. It was released on March 30, 2010, through Enemy Soil/Babygrande Records. Recording sessions took place at Found Sound Recording in Philadelphia. Production was handled by Crown, DJ Kwestion, Vanderslice, Aktone, Apathy, Celph Titled, DC the Midi Alien, Grand Finale, Hypnotist Beats, JBL the Titan, MTK, Triple Z and Undefined.

In the United States, the album debuted at number 42 on the Top R&B/Hip-Hop Albums, number 19 on the Top Rap Albums, number 27 on the Independent Albums and number 6 on the Heatseekers Albums charts, selling 3,200 units in its first week of release.

The album marks the final appearance by Jus Allah and welcomes two new members: Block McCloud and Journalist. The latter would make his only contribution to AOTP albums.

== Track listing ==
No.	Title	Writer(s)	Producer(s)	Length
1.	"Agony Fires"	Vincenzo Luvineri; Mario Collazo; Vic Mercer; Chad Bromley; Thomas Mooney	Crown	3:47
2.	"Ripped to Shreds"	Mercer; Jose Vargas; Luvineri; Paco Urquieta	Aktone	4:04
3.	"Bust 'Em In"	Sharif Lacey; Bromley; Mercer	Celph Titled	3:36
4.	"Prisoner"	Collazo; Kenneth Greene; Vargas; Luvineri; M. Henzey	Undefined	3:54
5.	"Godzilla"	Mercer; James Bostick; Bromley; Collazo; Jason Faust; Luvineri; B. Miklos	Grand Finale	4:26
6.	"Suplex"	David Edens; Vargas; Daniel Albaladejo; Luvineri; Eric Vanderslice	Vanderslice	4:29
7.	"Contra Mantra"	Marcus Albaladejo; Seamus Ryan; Mercer; Darryl Christy	DC the Midi Alien	4:33
8.	"Drenched in Blood"	Collazo; Vargas; M. Albaladejo; D. Albaladejo; Luvineri; Matthew Crabtree	MTK	3:54
9.	"Spaz Out"	Bromley; Faust; Ryan; Mercer; J. Ibarra	JBL the Titan	3:11
10.	"44 Magnum"	M. Albaladejo; Edens; Luvineri; Vargas; Vanderslice	Vanderslice	3:42
11.	"Dead Shall Rise"	Vargas; Mercer; Collazo; Lacey; Luvineri; Bromley; Mooney	Crown	4:57
12.	"Cookin' Keys"	Greene; Edens; M. Albaladejo; Vargas; Collazo; Lacey; Dave Klein	DJ Kwestion	5:34
13.	"Burn You Alive"	Ismael Diaz; Greene; Luvineri; Collazo; S. Ooijen	Triple Z	4:09
14.	"Hollow Points"	Collazo; Vargas; Luvineri; Greene; Dylan Guerin	Hypnotist Beats	5:19
15.	"Suicide Girl"	Collazo; Greene; Bromley	Apathy	4:34
16.	"The Ultimatum"	Faust; Edens; Lacey; D. Albaladejo; Luvineri; Mercer; Collazo; Bromley; M. Albaladejo; Rafiek George; Klein	DJ Kwestion	6:31
Total length:				1:10:40

== Personnel ==
- Vincenzo "Vinnie Paz" Luvineri – vocals (tracks: 1, 2, 4–6, 8, 10, 11, 13, 14, 16), additional vocals (track 3), executive producer
- Mario "Planetary" Collazo – vocals (tracks: 1, 4, 5, 8, 11–16), additional vocals (track 7)
- Vic "Celph Titled" Mercer – vocals (tracks: 1–3, 5, 7, 9, 11, 16), producer & mixing (track 3)
- Chad "Apathy" Bromley – vocals (tracks: 1, 3, 5, 9, 11, 15, 16), producer (track 15), mixing (tracks: 5, 15), arrangement (track 5)
- Jose "Demoz" Vargas – vocals (tracks: 2, 4, 6, 8, 10–12, 14)
- Sharif "Reef the Lost Cauze" Lacey – vocals (tracks: 3, 11, 12, 16)
- Kenneth "Doap Nixon" Greene – vocals (tracks: 4, 12–15)
- James "Jus Allah" Bostick – vocals (track 5)
- Jason "King Magnetic" Faust – vocals (tracks: 5, 9, 16)
- David "Des Devious" Edens – vocals (tracks: 6, 10, 12, 16)
- Daniel "King Syze" Albaladejo – vocals (tracks: 6, 8, 16)
- Marcus "Crypt the Warchild" Albaladejo – vocals (tracks: 7, 8, 10, 12, 16)
- Seamus "Esoteric" Ryan – vocals (tracks: 7, 9)
- Ismael "Block McCloud" Diaz Jr. – vocals (track 13)
- Rafiek "Journalist" George – vocals (track 16)
- Dave "DJ Kwestion" Klein – scratches (tracks: 7, 16), producer (tracks: 12, 16)
- Thomas "Crown" Mooney – producer (tracks: 1, 11)
- Paco "Aktone" Urquieta – producer (track 2)
- M. "Undefined" Henzey – producer (track 4)
- B. "Grand Finale" Miklos – producer (track 5)
- Eric Vanderslice – producer (tracks: 6, 10)
- Darryl "DC the Midi Alien" Christy – producer & mixing (track 7)
- Matthew "MTK" Crabtree – producer (track 8)
- J. "JBL the Titan" Ibarra – producer (track 9)
- S. "Triple Z" Ooijen – producer (track 13)
- Dylan "Hypnotist Beats" Guerin – producer (track 14)
- Scott "Supe" Stallone – recording & mixing (tracks: 1, 2, 4, 6, 8–14, 16)
- Mark B. Christensen – mastering
- Daniel Fry – mastering assistant
- Dan Bradley – artwork, design

== Charts ==
Chart (2010)	Peak position
US Top R&B/Hip-Hop Albums (Billboard)	42
US Top Rap Albums (Billboard)	19
US Independent Albums (Billboard)	27
US Heatseekers Albums (Billboard)	6
