= Stoupe the Enemy of Mankind =

American record producer

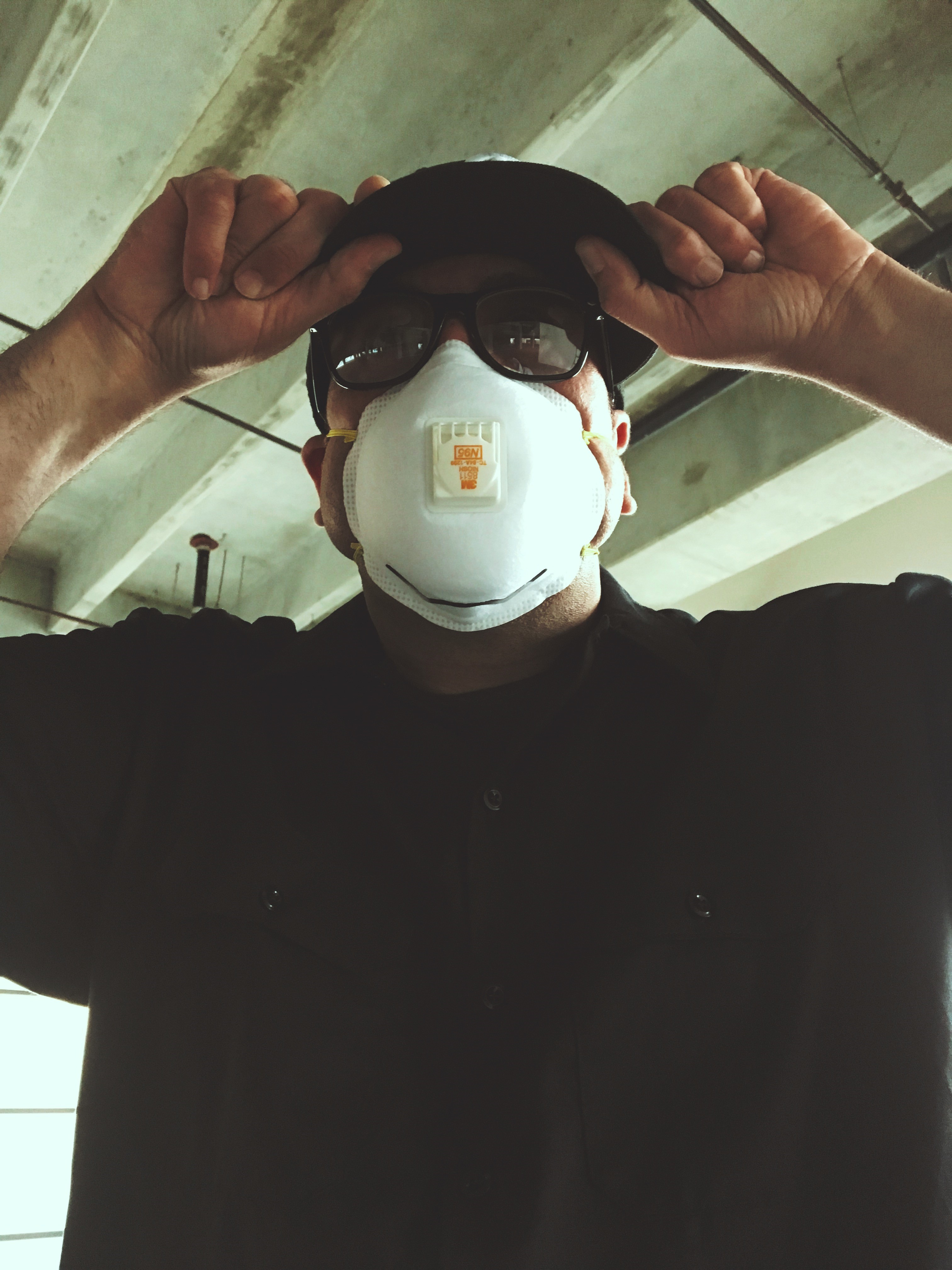
- Stoupe in 2019

Background information
- Born: Kevin Baldwin
- Origin: Philadelphia, Pennsylvania, U.S.
- Genre: Hip hop
- Occupation: Hip hop producer
- Years active: 1993–present
- Labels: Babygrande, Enemy Soil

Kevin Baldwin, better known by his stage name Stoupe the Enemy of Mankind or simply Stoupe, is an American hip hop producer, DJ, and member of the underground hip hop group Jedi Mind Tricks. Stoupe has worked with only a limited number of artists outside of Jedi Mind Tricks, including Stove God Cooks, 7L & Esoteric, Canibus, Virtuoso, Guru of Gang Starr and Switch.

== Career ==
After years as a duo and then a trio, Baldwin left Jedi Mind Tricks in 2011 and Violence Begets Violence would be their only album to not feature Stoupe production. Vinnie Paz stated in a blog on the JMT website that Stoupe had lacked interest in the group and decided to focus on other things in his career, such as his side groups, and that Stoupe would not be producing any of the tracks on the new JMT album. However, Stoupe returned to Jedi Mind Tricks in 2014 and Jus Allah left the group for the second time. Stoupe and Paz worked on a new album called The Thief and the Fallen, which was released on June 2, 2015.

Stoupe's only full-length solo album Decalogue was released on March 31, 2009, under Babygrande Records. It featured a mixture of underground and popular rappers (for instance M.O.P.) performing over Stoupe's productions. In 2010, Baldwin and long-time associate Liz Fullerton formed a duo together called Dutch and they released their first album A Bright Cold Day on June 8 under Enemy Soil. Fullerton had previously contributed vocals to Jedi Mind Tricks' song Death Messiah.

In 2011, Stoupe released his follow-up album, this time with side project Vespertina, featuring songwriter Lorrie Doriza, who was previously featured in Decalogue, entitled The Waiting Wolf on May 10 under his label Dusty Pockets.

In November 2013, as one of the first acts on Stoupe's new production company, Bad Tape Music, Red Martina released their debut Intransit with Stoupe as the producer on all thirteen tracks. Other band members are rapper Noesis (from Philadelphia Slick), multi-instrumentalist Ish Quintero, and vocalist Hayley Cass. In November 2017, Red Martina released their second album, Come On Home.

In 2017, Stoupe teamed up with singer Eamon to co-produce a record called the Golden Rail Motel. Stoupe was not only responsible for the production on this record, but also holds writing credits on some of the songs. The album was well received with critics and songs from the Golden Rail Motel were featured in films and television. The song "You and Only You" was included on the original soundtrack of Ocean's 8, other songs were featured in TV series like Black-ish and Netflix's On My Block.

On July 1, 2019, Stoupe released a cryptic concept album called they available only on a limited vinyl run. The project's focus is quoted as "[an] instrumental exploration into markov's dynamics and the human condition". This mostly instrumental album features co-production by C-Lance and performances by Recognize Ali and Lorrie Doriza.

== Production credits ==
=== With Jedi Mind Tricks ===
Album information
The Psycho-Social, Chemical, Biological & Electro-Magnetic Manipulation of Human Consciousness
- Released: November 4, 1997
- Label: Superegular
Violent by Design
- Released: October 3, 2000
- Label: Superegular
Visions of Gandhi
- Released: August 26, 2003
- Label: Babygrande
Legacy of Blood
- Released: August 24, 2004
- Label: Babygrande
Servants in Heaven, Kings in Hell
- Released: September 19, 2006
- Label: Babygrande
A History of Violence
- Released: November 11, 2008
- Label: Babygrande
The Thief and the Fallen
- Released: June 2, 2015
- Label: Enemy Soil
The Bridge and the Abyss
- Released: June 22, 2018
- Label: Enemy Soil
The Funeral and the Raven
- Released: 19 November, 2021
- Label: Iron Tusk

=== With Red Martina ===
Album information
Intransit
- Released: November 5, 2013
- Label: Bad Tape Music
Come On Home
- Released: November 17, 2014
- Label: Bad Tape Music

=== With Canibus ===
Album information
Rip the Jacker
- Released: July 22, 2003
- Label: Babygrande

=== Other projects ===
Album information
Decalogue (Stoupe)
- Released: March 31, 2009
- Label: Babygrande
A Bright Cold Day (Dutch)
- Released: June 8, 2010
- Label: Dusty Pockets/Enemy Soil
The Waiting Wolf (Vespertina)
- Released: May 10, 2011
- Label: Dusty Pockets
Golden Rail Motel (Eamon)
- Released: September 15, 2017
- Label: Huey Ave Music
"they." (Stoupe)
- Released: July 1, 2019
- Label: Mankind Music

=== EPs, singles and other production ===
Album information
Amber Probe EP (Jedi Mind Tricks)
- Released: 1996
- Label: Superegular
"Trial by Stone" (Doublespeek)
- Released: 1996
- Label: OneSoul Productions
- B-Side: "Remind Body", "Black China"
"The Move" (Neso)
- Released: 1997
- Label: Superegular
- B-Side: "Mad Coolout", "The Balance"
"I Could Have Done More" (Reks)
- Released: 2000
- Label: Raptivism
- Track: "In Who We Trust"
"Raw Is War" (Vinnie Paz)
- Released: 2000
- Label: Direct
- Tracks: "Language Is Fatal"
Baldhead Slick & Da Click (Guru)
- Released: 2001
- Label: Landspeed
- Track: "War Tactics"
World War One: The Voice of Reason (Virtuoso)
- Released: 2001
- Label: Brick
- Track: "All We Know"
Dangerous Connection (7L & Esoteric)
- Released: 2002
- Label: Brick
- Track: "Terrorist's Cell"
Mic Club: The Curriculum (Canibus)
- Released: 2002
- Label: Mic Club
- Track: "Liberal Arts"
The Devil Never Dies (Slaine)
- Released: 2010
- Label: Suburban Noize Records
- Track: "The Deadzone"
3 Assassins (Grindhouse Gang (Mark Deez, Powder aka Casey Jones, Dr. iLL)
- Released: 2014
- Label: iLL-Legit Records
- Track: "Isolation"
One Step Closer (Slaine, Switch)
- Released: 2024
- Label: URBNET Records
