= Journalist (rapper) =

American rapper

- Born: Rafiek George
- Origin: Philadelphia, Pennsylvania, U.S.
- Genre: Hip hop
- Occupation: Rapper
- Years active: 1998–present
- Labels: Motown, Hardrout, Babygrande
- Website: hardrout.com

Rafiek George, better known by his stage name Journalist, is an American rapper. He gives much of the credit for his success to his mother, who worked hard to raise five other family members. After graduating he went out to get a recording contract. Supporting himself as a public speaker, youth counselor, and taking parts in talent shows, Journalist eventually earned himself his first paycheck after triumphing in a talent search held at New Jersey's Stardust ballroom two years after graduating.

In 1999 Journalist auditioned for a Universal Records contract with Julius Erving, Jr. as his manager. Later disambanding the record label after no success. Journalist has made appearances with Canibus on the album 2000 B.C., in the songs "Life Liquid", and "Die slow", and releasing various mixtapes, Before eventually releasing his debut album "Scribes of Life" on the Motown record label in 2002. Scribes of Life includes guest appearances such as Backbone, Floetry, M.O.P, and Sleepy Brown with production from DJ Jazzy Jeff, and others.

In 2009, Journalist was added to the hip hop supergroup Army of the Pharaohs. He was only featured on the track The Ultimatum alongside members King Magnetic, Des Devious, Reef The Lost Cauze, King Syze, Vinnie Paz, Celph Titled, Planetary, Apathy and Crypt The Warchild. This track was featured on Army of the Pharaohs album The Unholy Terror. The album was released early on March 19, 2010. He is currently working on his second studio album titled Fast Nowhere which is to be released via his own record label Hardrout

== Career ==
=== Early career (1995–2001) ===
In 1995, with his high-school diploma in hand, Journalist made his choice and set out to snag a recording contract. Until opportunity came knocking, he supported himself with jobs as a public speaker and youth counselor. While employed by Children's Hospital in Philadelphia, he took part in a number of talent shows. Two years after graduating from high school, the rapper earned his first paycheck from performing when he triumphed in a talent search held at New Jersey's the Stardust Ballroom. Journalist started rapping as a career path in 1998 and in 1999, Journalist auditioned for a Universal Records contract with Julius Erving Jr. as his manager. Soon he was a member of the company's stable that also included young artists like Nelly and Juvenile. Unfortunately, his career did not take off as expected and the rapper moved to Motown. Scribes of Life, his debut Motown release, featured Journalist's version of the Patti LaBelle hit "On My Own. In 2000, Journalist made appearances with Canibus on the album 2000 B.C., in the songs "Life Liquid", and "Die slow", and releasing various mixtapes.

=== Scribes of Life and Featuring (2002–2008) ===
Journalist eventually released his debut album Scribes of Life on the Motown record label in 2002. Scribes of Life includes guest appearances from artists such as Backbone, Floetry, Mash Out Posse, and Sleepy Brown and contained production from DJ Jazzy Jeff, and others. Later in 2002, Journalist released various singles including; The Way It Used To Be, Self Explanatory and Let's Get Up as 12" Promotional singles.

In 2003, Journalist was seen on Doo Wop's album The State vs. Doo Wop on the track Phillys Finest, other artists including Gilly Da Kid, Dutch, Bumpy Johnson were also featured on the song. He was also featured on Mr. Cheeks track Reminisce 03 from the album; Back Again!

In 2008, Journalist was featured on another compilation album with various other artist titled; Best Of Clue: The Freestyles: Part One on a freestyle alongside long-time friend and rapper; Canibus.

=== Few Blocks from Christian St. (2015–2016) ===
I like to put music out when I feel timing is right. I always bangs with the hip hop game even through some of the changes but I love and live the art so that's what keeps me attached.

— Journalist, on his main focus of making music.

In 2009, Journalist featured with the group Army of the Pharaohs on the track The Ultimatum alongside members King Magnetic, Des Devious, Reef The Lost Cauze, King Syze, Vinnie Paz, Celph Titled, Planetary, Apathy and Crypt The Warchild. This track was later featured on Army of the Pharaohs third studio album The Unholy Terror. The album was released early on March 19, 2010.

In 2011, Journalist released a series of mixtapes titled Offseason and Preseason hosted by Philadelphia-based DJ Jay Ski. While Supplies Last released and stamped through Dj Supa of Violator Dj's followed later on in 2011. Also, Journalist was seen on fellow Army of the Pharaoh member; Doap Nixons album Gray Poupon on the track About Me. In 2015, Journalist announced that he was working on his second studio album titled Few Blocks from Christian St., the album was originally supposed to be released July 2013 and via his own record label Hardrout, however it was pushed back. It was originally said that Journalist is going to be on Army of the Pharaohs upcoming fourth studio album; In Death Reborn but this was later debunked that he was not confirmed to be on the album. However, other artists including; Vinnie Paz, Apathy, Blacastan, Block McCloud, Celph Titled, Crypt The Warchild, Demoz, Des Devious, Doap Nixon, Esoteric, King Magnetic, King Syze, Planetary, Reef the Lost Cauze and V-Zilla are said to be on the album.

=== Post Season (2017–2019) ===
In 2017, Journalist announced he was working on his second studio album, Post Season.

== Discography ==
=== Albums ===
- Scribes of Life, (Motown, 2002)
- Post Season, (Hardrout, 2018)

=== Singles ===
- The Way It Used to Be, (Motown, 2002)
- Extended Family feat M.O.P, (Motown, 2001)
- "The Children", ft Trevy Is Famous x Chris DeVille

(Dream of Happiness 2016)

=== Collaboration ===
- The Unholy Terror (2010)

=== Guest appearances ===
- 2000 B.C. (2000)
- Back Again! (2003)
- State vs. Doo Wop (2003)
- I Miss the Hip Hop Shop (2004)
- Melatonin Magik (2010)
