= Philadelphia Slick =

American hip hop group

Background information
- Also known as: Philly Slick
- Origin: Philadelphia, Pennsylvania, U.S.
- Genre: Alternative hip hop
- Years active: 2005-Present
- Labels: Philadelphia Slick, Badtape Music
- Members: Noesis, El Smooth, Mike Polinsky, Matt Schwartz, Lionel Forrester Jr.
- Past members: Zach Reilly, Mike Tjader, Marc Kaplan, Yoomi Kwon, Ann Goering, Adam Hershberger, Jenn Z
- Website: www.PhiladelphiaSlick.com

Philadelphia Slick is a live hip hop band, fronted by rapper Noesis, formed in 2005. El Smooth and Noesis handle production for the band, which also includes saxophonist Matt Schwartz, bassist Mike Polinsky, and Ishmael Quintero.

In 2007 Philadelphia Slick won Philadelphia City Paper's Reader's Choice award for Top Local Band.

As of 2013, Philadelphia Slick is signed to Stoupe the Enemy of Mankind's Badtape Music label.

== History ==
In 2006, Philadelphia Slick played the Emergenza Festival with performances at The Fire, The Five Spot, and The North Star Bar. The finals were held at the Theater of the Living Arts, where Noesis was named “Best Vocalist”.

The group's first venture came out in late 2007, though Noesis himself has released five solo albums. In 2007 Philadelphia Slick took home first prize in the Philly Sound Clash, a competition sponsored by PhillyCarShare at World Café Live. In 2007 the band was the winner of the Philadelphia City Paper's Reader's Choice award for Top Local Band.

In 2010, the group released The Everything's Game EP, recorded at Bobby Eli's Studio E, displaying a difference in sound quality between Everything's Game and their last album, Oil. Only six tracks and 20 minutes long, it's a concise release.

In June 2012 the track Gun 'Em Down from 2007's Culture Industry was used in a scene in Episode 4 of Sky Atlantic's Hit & Miss.

The Way Things Work, a solo album from Noesis independently released on July 6, 2012. Noesis's flow on the first single released, "A Picture," has drawn comparisons to Mos Def and Nas The album contains twenty tracks and features in house production from Noesis and drummer Elliot Garland (El Smooth). The Way Things Work won the Independent Music Award for best hip hop/rap album of the year in 2012-2013 and topped out at #4 on the CMJ urban radio charts.

In May 2012, it was announced that Philadelphia Slick would be performing on The Vans Warped Tour, in Uniondale, NY.

On November 5, 2013, it was announced that the band had formerly joined music label/production collective Badtape Music. Badtape was co-founded by Stoupe the Enemy of Mankind most known for his work with Jedi Mind Tricks and Philly Slick's own Noesis.

== Discography ==
Album information
Earth Rocks Harder
- Released: April 28, 2015
- Label: Badtape Music
Everything's Game
- Released: June, 2011
Oil
- Released: July, 2009
Culture Industry
- Released: November, 2007

=== Affiliates ===
- With Noesis, Stoupe, Ish Quintero:

Album information
Come On Home by Red Martina
- Released: November 21, 2014
- Label: Bad Tape Music
Intransit by Red Martina
- Released: November 5, 2013
- Label: Bad Tape Music

- With Noesis, El Smooth:

Album information
Beats and Watson by Beats and Watson
- Released: October 21, 2013
- Label: Bad Tape Music

- With Noesis:

Album information
The Way Things Work
- Released: June, 2012
Waste of Money as Thug B
- Released: 2007
Rhizomatic
- Released: 2005
Big Rock Candy Mountain
- Released: 2004
Notes from the Underground as Liquid Plumber
- Released: 2003
It's Elementary as Liquid Plumber
- Released: 2002
