= Violence Begets Violence =

Studio album by Jedi Mind Tricks
- Released: October 25, 2011
- Recorded: 2010–2011
- Genre: Hip-hop
- Length: 46:54
- Label: Enemy Soil
- Producers: C-Lance; Grand Finale; Hypnotist Beats; Illinformed; Junior Makhno; Mr. Green; Nero; Scott "Supe" Stallone; Shuko

Jedi Mind Tricks chronology
A History of Violence (2008)	Violence Begets Violence (2011)	The Thief and the Fallen (2015)

Violence Begets Violence is the seventh studio album by American hip-hop group Jedi Mind Tricks. It was released on October 25, 2011 via Enemy Soil Entertainment. Production was handled by C-Lance, Hypnotist Beats, Nero, Scott Stallone, Grand Finale, Illinformed, Junior Makhno, Mr. Green and Shuko. It features guest appearances from Demoz, Blacastan, Chip Fu, King Magnetic, Pacewon and Young Zee.

The album debuted at number 92 on the Top Current Album Sales, selling 4,400 copies in its first week.

== Background ==
Violence Begets Violence is the first Jedi Mind Tricks project to be released through the Enemy Soil label. It is also the only JMT album on which member Stoupe the Enemy of Mankind did not contribute to the production. According to Vinnie Paz and Jus Allah, the duo had grown tired of waiting for Stoupe to be “in the right mood” to work on a new Jedi Mind Tricks album, and consequently recruited other producers for the project.

== Critical reception ==
Professional ratings
Aggregate scores
Source	Rating
Metacritic	59/100
Review scores
Source	Rating
AllMusic	3/5 stars
The Boston Phoenix	3.5/4 stars
HipHopDX	3/5
RapReviews	8/10
Slant	0.5/5 stars
Urb	3.5/5 stars
XXL	L (3/5)

Violence Begets Violence was met with mixed reviews from music critics. At Metacritic, which assigns a normalized rating out of 100 to reviews from mainstream publications, the album received an average score of 59 based on six reviews.

Chris Faraone of The Boston Phoenix praised the album, saying "true to its title, Violence Begets Violence is the Philly powerhouse's most aggressive effort yet, a morally polluted playground that no sane unarmed person should dare to frolic in". M.F. DiBella of Urb described it as "an album that hardcore fans will appreciate but isn't likely to help garner any new followers".

Andres Tardio of HipHopDX stated that the album "may not draw too many new fans in, but it will serve to satisfy longtime supporters". Eric Grode of XXL resumed: "with Violence Begets Violence, JMT are as vicious and energetic as ever, reminding why they've been able to enjoy such longevity".

In his negative review for Slant magazine, Matthew Cole concluded: "there's just no reason for intelligent rap fans to inflict this album on themselves".

== Sales ==
In the United States, the album peaked at number 103 on the Billboard 200, number 15 on the Top R&B/Hip-Hop Albums, number 9 on the Top Rap Albums, number 24 on the Independent Albums, number 16 on the Tastemaker Albums and atop the Heatseekers Albums charts. It also made it to number 70 on the Swiss Hitparade.

== Track listing ==
No.	Title	Writer(s)	Producer(s)	Length
1.	"Intro"	Scott Stallone	Scott "Supe" Stallone	2:05
2.	"Burning the Mirror"	Vincenzo Luviner; James Bostick; Craig Lanciani	C-Lance	3:33
3.	"When Crows Descend Upon You" (featuring Demoz)	Luviner; Bostick; Jose Vargas; Dylan Guerin	Hypnotist Beats	3:55
4.	"Fuck Ya Life" (featuring Blacastan)	Luviner; Bostick; Ira Osu; Junior Makhno	Junior Makhno	3:59
5.	"Imperial Tyranny" (featuring King Magnetic)	Luviner; Bostick; Jason Faust; Lanciani	C-Lance	3:41
6.	"Design in Malice" (featuring Young Zee and Pacewon)	Luviner; Bostick; Dewayne Battle; Jerome Hinds, Jr.; Aaron Green	Mr. Green	3:38
7.	"Weapon of Unholy Wrath"	Luviner; Bostick; Christoph Bauss	Shuko	3:53
8.	"Target Practice"	Luviner; Bostick; Guerin	Hypnotist Beats	2:39
9.	"Carnival of Souls" (featuring Demoz)	Luviner; Bostick; Vargas; B. Miklos	Grand Finale	3:54
10.	"Willing a Destruction Onto Humanity"	Luviner; Bostick; Lanciani	C-Lance	2:54
11.	"Chalice" (featuring Chip Fu)	Luviner; Bostick; Roderick Roachford; William Leigh	Illinformed; Scott "Supe" Stallone (add.)	3:46
12.	"Bloodborn Enemy"	Luviner; Bostick; F. Bruno	Nero	2:50
13.	"The Sacrilege of Fatal Arms"	Luviner; Bostick; Lanciani	C-Lance	2:43
14.	"Street Lights"	Luviner; Bostick; Bruno	Nero	3:24
Total length:				46:54

== Personnel ==
- Vincenzo "Vinnie Paz" Luvineri – vocals
- James "Jus Allah" Bostick – vocals
- Jose "Demoz" Vargas – vocals (tracks: 3, 9)
- Ira "Blacastan" Osu – vocals (track 4)
- Jason "King Magnetic" Faust – vocals (track 5)
- Dewayne "Young Zee" Battle – vocals (track 6)
- Jerome "Pacewon" Hinds, Jr. – vocals (track 6)
- Roderick "Chip-Fu" Roachford – vocals (track 11)
- Dave "DJ Kwestion" Klein – scratches (tracks: 4, 5, 12, 13)
- Scott "Supe" Stallone – producer (track 1), additional producer (track 11), engineering, mixing
- Craig "C-Lance" Lanciani – producer (tracks: 2, 5, 10, 13)
- Dylan "Hypnotist Beats" Guerin – producer (tracks: 3, 8)
- Junior Makhno – producer (track 4)
- Aaron "Mr. Green" Green – producer (track 6)
- Christoph "Shuko" Bauss – producer (track 7)
- B. "Grand Finale" Miklos – producer (track 9)
- William "Illinformed" Leigh – producer (track 11)
- F. "Nero" Bruno – producer (tracks: 12, 14)
- Pete Humphreys – mastering
- Dan Bradley – design, layout

== Charts ==
Chart (2011)	Peak position
Swiss Albums (Schweizer Hitparade)	70
US Billboard 200	103
US Top R&B/Hip-Hop Albums (Billboard)	15
US Top Rap Albums (Billboard)	9
US Independent Albums (Billboard)	24
US Heatseekers Albums (Billboard)	1
US Tastemaker Albums (Billboard)	16
