= Season of the Assassin =

Studio album by Vinnie Paz
- Released: June 21, 2010
- Recorded: 2009–2010
- Genre: Hip-hop
- Length: 1:16:27
- Label: Enemy Soil; The Orchard
- Producer: 4th Disciple; Bronze Nazareth; C-Lance; Da Beatminerz; Davel "Bo" McKenzie; DC The Midi Alien; DJ Kwestion; DJ Muggs; Fizzy Womack; Lord Finesse; Madlib; ManyBeats; MoSS; MTK; Scott "Supe" Stallone; Shuko; Sicknature; Stu Bangas

Vinnie Paz chronology
Season of the Assassin (2010)	God of the Serengeti (2012)

Season of the Assassin is the debut studio album by American rapper Vinnie Paz. It was released on June 21, 2010, by Enemy Soil Entertainment and The Orchard. Initially entitled Assassin's Creed, it was renamed due to legal issues with Ubisoft.

Production was handled by C-Lance, Shuko, 4th Disciple, Bronze Nazareth, Da Beatminerz, Davel "Bo" McKenzie, DC The Midi Alien, DJ Kwestion, DJ Muggs, Fizzy Womack, Lord Finesse, Madlib, ManyBeats, MoSS, MTK, Scott "Supe" Stallone, Sicknature and Stu Bangas.

It features contributions from Block McCloud, Amalie Bruun, Beanie Sigel, Black Plague, Clipse, Demoz, Freeway, Ill Bill, Jakk Frost, Lawrence Arnell, Liz Fullerton, Paul Wall, R.A. the Rugged Man, Shara Nova and Sick Jacken.

In the United States, the album debuted at number 44 on the Top R&B/Hip-Hop Albums, number 25 on the Top Rap Albums and number 12 on the Heatseekers Albums charts.

Celebrating its 10th anniversary, the album was reissued as 'Diamante Edition' with six remixed songs on August 28, 2020.

== Critical reception ==
Professional ratings
Review scores
Source	Rating
AllMusic	3.5/5 stars
HipHopDX	4/5
RapReviews	8/10
The Phoenix	3.5/4 stars
Urb	3.5/5 stars

Season of the Assassin was met with generally favorable reviews from music critics. Chris Faraone of The Boston Phoenix praised the album, stating: "fortunately, his first official solo project (which also happens to be his debut on his new Enemy Soil imprint) finds the Philly flamethrower punching the outer limits of his range without breaking character". Sean Ryon of HipHopDX called it "an exciting break from the usual JMT formula, with Paz hitting his stride as a lyricist and showing a different and more fully-rounded side to his craft". Steve 'Flash' Juon of RapReviews summed up: "if you've liked anything Paz has done before now to date Season of the Assassin will be right up your alley, and if he's just too savage and guttural for your taste nothing here will change your opinion. This is uncut unfiltered malice". AllMusic's Matt Rinaldi wrote: "one unexpected surprise of Season of the Assassin is that even Paz's brand of brutal, hardcore hip-hop can't resist the lure of compressed vocal harmonizing and, unlike his Jedi Mind Tricks and Army of the Pharaohs albums, this record has a fair share of R&B-tinged choruses". MF DiBella of Urb resumed: "this is a solid album especially if you're in an angry-at-the-world mood".

== Track listing ==
No.	Title	Writer(s)	Producer(s)	Length
1.	"Intro"	Vincent Luviner; Fabian Mattle	ManyBeats	1:15
2.	"Beautiful Love"	Luviner; Christoph Bauss	Shuko	3:03
3.	"Monster's Ball"	Luviner; Stuart Hudgins	Stu Bangas	3:39
4.	"Pistolvania" (featuring Freeway and Jakk Frost)	Luviner; Leslie Pridgen; Tyrone Starks; Craig Lanciani	C-Lance	4:00
5.	"End of Days" (featuring Block McCloud)	Luviner; Ismael Diaz; Jeppe Andersen	Sicknature	3:47
6.	"Righteous Kill"	Luviner; Robert Hall; Davel McKenzie	Lord Finesse; Davel "Bo" McKenzie	3:42
7.	"No Spiritual Surrender" (featuring Sick Jacken)	Luviner; Joaquin Gonzalez; Lawrence Muggerud	DJ Muggs	3:39
8.	"Street Wars" (featuring the Clipse and Block McCloud)	Luviner; Terrence Thornton; Gene Thornton; Diaz; Bauss; Peter Albertz	Shuko; Fonty (co.)	4:11
9.	"Ain't Shit Changed" (featuring Lawrence Arnell)	Luviner; Lawrence Arnell; Matthew Crabtree	MTK	4:04
10.	"Aristotle's Dilemma"	Luviner; Otis Jackson, Jr.	Madlib	3:26
11.	"Kill 'Em All" (featuring Beanie Sigel)	Luviner; Dwight Grant; Lanciani	C-Lance	3:51
12.	"Keep Movin' On" (featuring Shara Worden)	Luviner; Shara Worden; Jason Connoy	MoSS	4:25
13.	"Brick Wall" (featuring Ill Bill and Demoz)	Luviner; William Braunstein; Jose Vargas; Lanciani	C-Lance	4:20
14.	"Role of Life"	Luviner; Justin Cross	Bronze Nazareth	3:32
15.	"Nosebleed" (featuring R.A. the Rugged Man and Amalie Bruun)	Luviner; Richard Andrew Thorburn; Amalie Bruun; Darryl Christy	DC The Midi Alien	3:05
16.	"Warmonger" (featuring Black Plague)	Luviner; Wayne Peace; Jamal Grinnage	Fizzy Womack	3:57
17.	"Paul and Paz" (featuring Paul Wall and Block McCloud)	Luviner; Paul Slayton; Diaz; Lanciani	C-Lance	3:19
18.	"Bad Day"	Luviner; Walter Dewgarde	Da Beatminerz	2:47
19.	"Washed in the Blood of the Lamb"	Luviner; Selwyn Bougard	4th Disciple	4:03
20.	"Drag You to Hell"	Luviner; Dave Klein	DJ Kwestion	4:16
21.	"Same Story (My Dedication)" (featuring Liz Fullerton)	Luviner; Elizabeth Fullerton-Dummit; Scott Stalone	Scott "Supe" Stallone	4:06
Total length:				1:16:27

Diamante Edition bonus tracks
No.	Title	Writer(s)	Producer(s)	Length
22.	"Pistolvania (Remix)" (featuring Freeway and Jakk Frost)	Luviner; Pridgen; Starks; Lanciani; B. Dixon	Giallo Point	3:42
23.	"End of Days (Remix 1)" (featuring Block McCloud)	Luviner; Diaz; Lanciani	C-Lance	3:07
24.	"End of Days (Remix 2)" (featuring Block McCloud)	Luviner; Diaz; Lanciani	C-Lance	3:20
25.	"Street Wars (Remix)" (featuring the Clipse and Block McCloud)	Luviner; T. Thornton; G. Thornton; Diaz; Bauss; Albertz; Lanciani	C-Lance	3:58
26.	"Nosebleed (Remix)" (featuring R.A. the Rugged Man and Amalie Bruun)	Luviner; Thorburn; Bruun; Christy; Lanciani	C-Lance	2:58
27.	"Paul and Paz (Remix)" (featuring Paul Wall and Block McCloud)	Luviner; Slayton; Diaz; Lanciani	C-Lance	3:17

Notes

- "Same Story (My Dedication)" was originally produced by Anno Domini Nation, but it has been changed on the album because of a problem clearing the sample from "Winter Song" by Sara Bareilles.

== Charts ==
Chart (2010)	Peak position
US Top R&B/Hip-Hop Albums (Billboard)	44
US Top Rap Albums (Billboard)	25
US Heatseekers Albums (Billboard)	12
