= Legacy of Blood =

Studio album by Jedi Mind Tricks
- Released: August 24, 2004
- Genre: Underground hip-hop
- Length: 1:07:21
- Label: Babygrande
- Producer: Stoupe the Enemy of Mankind

Jedi Mind Tricks chronology
Visions of Gandhi (2003)	Legacy of Blood (2004)	Servants in Heaven, Kings in Hell (2006)

Singles from Legacy of Blood
- 1. "Before the Great Collapse" Released: 2004; 2. "The Age of Sacred Terror" Released: 2005

Professional ratings
Review scores
Source	Rating
AllMusic	3/5 stars
HipHopDX	3.5/5
Laut.de	3/5 stars
PopMatters	7/10
RapReviews	7/10

Legacy of Blood is the fourth studio album by American hip-hop group Jedi Mind Tricks. It was released on August 24, 2004, via Babygrande Records. Production was handled by member Stoupe the Enemy of Mankind, with Chuck Wilson serving as executive producer. It features guest appearances from Des Devious, GZA, Killah Priest and Sean Price.

== Track listing ==
No.	Title	Writer(s)	Length
1.	"Intro"		1:27
2.	"The Age of Sacred Terror"	Vincenzo Luvineri	4:27
3.	"Scars of the Crucifix"	Luvineri	4:00
4.	"Death Falls Silent (Interlude)"		0:23
5.	"Saviorself" (featuring Killah Priest)	Luvineri; Walter Reed	4:28
6.	"On the Eve of War (Julio Caesar Chavez Mix)" (featuring GZA)	Luvineri; Gary Grice	3:59
7.	"The Darkest Throne (Interlude)"		0:45
8.	"The Worst"	Luvineri	4:03
9.	"Verses of the Bleeding" (featuring Des Devious)	Luvineri; David Edens	3:48
10.	"Beyond the Gates of Pain" (featuring Sean Price)	Luvineri; Sean Price	3:41
11.	"Farewell to the Flesh (Interlude)"	Luvineri	0:54
12.	"And So It Burns"	Luvineri	4:24
13.	"The Spirit of Hate (Interlude)"		0:59
14.	"Me Ne Shalto"	Luvineri	3:52
15.	"On the Eve of War (Meldrick Taylor Mix)" (featuring GZA)	Luvineri; Grice	2:58
16.	"Winds Devouring Men (Interlude)"		0:54
17.	"The Philosophy of Horror"	Luvineri	3:57
18.	"Of the Spirit and the Sun (Interlude)"		0:43
19.	"Before the Great Collapse / The President's Wife" (featuring Des Devious)	Luvineri; Edens	17:39
Total length:			1:07:21

Notes

- "Intro" samples "Make It Easy On Yourself" by The Walker Brothers and a promo from WWE wrestler Kane.
- "Saviorself" samples Sonya & Kevin Stewart "I Love You".
- "The Darkest Throne" samples dialogue from A Bronx Tale.
- "Farewell to the Flesh" samples comments from author Hunter S. Thompson and a monologue by Dolph Lundgren from the 1989 Punisher motion picture.
- "The Spirit of Hate" samples dialogue from Beneath the Planet of the Apes.
- "Of the Spirit and the Sun" samples an interview with Charles Manson.
- "Scars of The Crucifix" contains samples from the film The Addiction.
- "And So It Burns" contains samples from Giacomo Rondinella's "Keep on Lying".
- "The Philosophy of Horror" contains dialogue sample from 1970 film Cromwell.

== Personnel ==
- Vincenzo "Vinnie Paz" Luvineri – rap vocals (tracks: 2, 3, 5, 6, 8–12, 14, 15, 17, 19)
- Walter "Killah Priest" Reed – rap vocals (track 5)
- Gary "GZA" Grice – rap vocals (tracks: 6, 15)
- David "Des Devious" Edens – rap vocals (tracks: 9, 19)
- Sean Price – rap vocals (track 10)
- DJ Drew Dollars – scratches
- Kevin "Stoupe the Enemy of Mankind" Baldwin – producer
- Scott "Supe" Stallone – engineering, mixing
- Chris Conway – recording (tracks: 5, 10)
- J. Marty – recording (tracks: 6, 15)
- Chuck Wilson – executive producer
- Trevor "Karma" Gendron – design, layout
- Mike McRath – photography
- Chase Jones – management
- Jesse Stone – management

== Charts ==
Chart (2004)	Peak position
US Top R&B/Hip-Hop Albums (Billboard)	63
US Independent Albums (Billboard)	22
US Heatseekers Albums (Billboard)	19
