= Amber Probe =

EP by Jedi Mind Tricks
- Released: November 5, 1996
- Genres: Underground hip-hop; East Coast hip-hop
- Label: Superegular Records
- Producer: Stoupe the Enemy of Mankind

Jedi Mind Tricks chronology
The Common Thread EP (as Soulcraft) (1995)	Amber Probe (1996)	The Psycho-Social, Chemical, Biological & Electro-Magnetic Manipulation of Human Consciousness (1997)

Amber Probe is the debut EP from Philadelphia underground hip-hop duo Jedi Mind Tricks, released on November 5, 1996.

The 1996 album included the tracks "Neva Antiquated (Dark Jedi Remix)", "Communion: The Crop Circle Thesis" and "Books of Blood: The Coming of Tan", which were all included the following year on their full-length debut, The Psycho-Social, Chemical, Biological & Electro-Magnetic Manipulation of Human Consciousness.

== Track listing ==
- All songs produced by Stoupe the Enemy of Mankind

No.	Title	Length
1.	"Neva Antiquated"	3:30
2.	"Neva Antiquated" (Instrumental)	1:15
3.	"Communion: The Crop Circle Thesis" (featuring The Lost Children of Babylon)	5:04
4.	"Neva Antiquated" (Dark Jedi Remix)	4:33
5.	"Neva Antiquated" (Dark Jedi Remix) (Instrumental)	1:16
6.	"Books of Blood: The Coming of Tan" (featuring El Eloh)	3:56
