= A History of Violence (album) =

Studio album by Jedi Mind Tricks
- Released: November 11, 2008
- Recorded: 2007–2008
- Studio: Found Sound Recording (Philadelphia, PA)
- Genre: Underground hip-hop
- Length: 45:15
- Label: Babygrande
- Producer: Stoupe the Enemy of Mankind

Jedi Mind Tricks chronology
Servants in Heaven, Kings in Hell (2006)	A History of Violence (2008)	Violence Begets Violence (2011)

Professional ratings
Review scores
Source	Rating
Chart Attack	4.5/5
HipHopDX	4/5
PopMatters	6/10
RapReviews	8.5/10
Spin	3/5 stars

A History of Violence is the sixth studio album by American hip-hop group Jedi Mind Tricks. It was released on November 11, 2008, via Babygrande Records. Recording sessions took place at Found Sound Recording in Philadelphia. Production was handled by member Stoupe the Enemy of Mankind. It features guest appearances from Block McCloud, Demoz, Doap Nixon, King Magnetic and OuterSpace.

In the United States, the album debuted at number 169 on the Billboard 200, number 49 on the Top R&B/Hip-Hop Albums, number 21 on the Top Rap Albums, number 19 on the Independent Albums, number 12 on the Tastemakers Albums and number 6 on the Heatseekers Albums charts, selling 4,168 copies in its first week out.

== Background ==
The album followed multiple summer releases from the Jedi Mind Tricks camp, including the group's first DVD, titled Divine Fire: The Story of Jedi Mind Tricks, and the Vinnie Paz-executively produced projects Jedi Mind Tricks presents Doap Nixon: Sour Diesel, Jedi Mind Tricks presents King Syze: The Labor Union, and Jedi Mind Tricks presents OuterSpace: God's Fury. The album's first single "Monolith" was released on October 2, 2008. Their second single "Godflesh" was released on their website. The album marks the return of former Jedi Mind Tricks member Jus Allah.

== Track listing ==
No.	Title	Writer(s)	Length
1.	"Intro"	Kevin Baldwin	1:06
2.	"Deathbed Doctrine"	Vincenzo Luviner; James Bostick; Baldwin	4:23
3.	"Deadly Melody" (featuring Block McCloud and Demoz)	Luviner; Bostick; Ismael Diaz; Jose Vargas; Baldwin	4:33
4.	"Monolith"	Luviner; Bostick; Baldwin	3:38
5.	"Those with No Eyes" (Interlude)	Baldwin	1:21
6.	"Trail of Lies"	Luviner; Baldwin	4:27
7.	"Heavy Artillery"	Luviner; Bostick; Baldwin	3:41
8.	"Seance of Shamans" (featuring OuterSpace and Doap Nixon)	Luviner; Bostick; Marcus Albaladejo; Mario Collazo; Kenneth Greene; Baldwin	4:09
9.	"Geometry in Static" (Interlude)	Baldwin	0:50
10.	"Godflesh" (featuring Block McCloud and King Magnetic)	Luviner; Bostick; Diaz; Jason Faust; Baldwin	4:08
11.	"Terror" (featuring Demoz)	Luviner; Bostick; Vargas; Baldwin	4:02
12.	"Butcher Knife Bloodbath"	Luviner; Bostick; Baldwin	3:55
13.	"The Sixth Gate Shines No More" (Interlude)	Baldwin	0:48
14.	"Death Messiah"	Luviner; Baldwin	4:14
Total length:			45:15

== Personnel ==
- Vincenzo "Vinnie Paz" Luvineri – vocals
- James "Jus Allah" Bostick – vocals
- Ismael "Block McCloud" Diaz Jr. – vocals (tracks: 3, 10)
- Jose "Demoz" Vargas – vocals (tracks: 3, 11)
- Marcus "Crypt the Warchild" Albaladejo – vocals (track 8)
- Mario "Planetary" Collazo – vocals (track 8)
- Kenneth "Doap Nixon" Greene – vocals (track 8)
- Jason "King Magnetic" Faust – vocals (track 10)
- Liz Fullerton – additional vocals (track 14)
- Dave "DJ Kwestion" Klein – scratches (tracks: 1, 2, 7, 8, 11, 12)
- Christopher "Fat Albert Einstein" Vagnoni – guitar & bass (tracks: 4, 12)
- Craig Maguire – guitar (track 14)
- Kevin "Stoupe the Enemy of Mankind" Baldwin – producer
- Scott "Supe" Stallone – recording, engineering, mixing
- Mark B. Christensen – mastering
- Charles "Chuck" Wilson Jr. – executive producer
- Dan Bradley – design, layout
- Mike McRath – photography

== Charts ==
Chart (2008)	Peak position
US Billboard 200	169
US Top R&B/Hip-Hop Albums (Billboard)	49
US Top Rap Albums (Billboard)	21
US Independent Albums (Billboard)	19
US Heatseekers Albums (Billboard)	6
