= Vinnie Paz =

American rapper (born 1977)

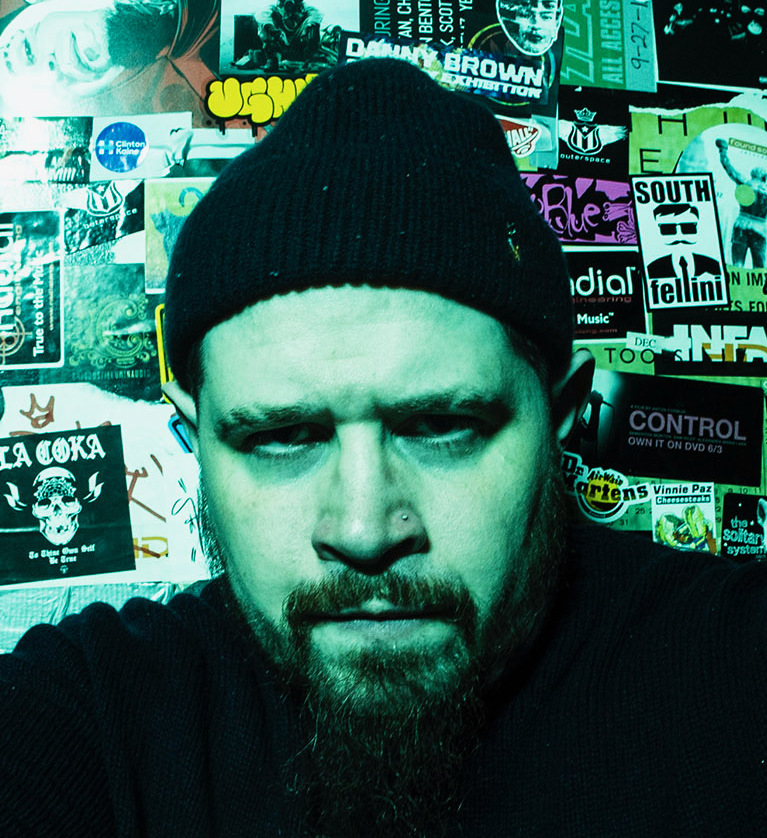
- Vinnie Paz in 2018

Background information
- Also known as: Various: Ikon the Verbal Hologram (former); Pazmanian Devil; Louie Doggs; Boxcutter Pazzy; Pazmanian Damien; Odrama vin Laden; Pack Pistol Pazzy; Pazienza; The Genocide General; Vincent Price; Broad Street Bully; Pistolero Pazzy; The Sicilian Shooter; Paz Man; Vin Laden
- Born: Vincenzo Luvineri; October 5, 1977 (age 49); Agrigento, Sicily, Italy
- Origin: Philadelphia, Pennsylvania, U.S.
- Genres: Hip-hop; hardcore hip-hop; political hip-hop; conscious hip-hop; underground hip-hop; horrorcore
- Occupations: Rapper; producer
- Years active: 1993–present
- Labels: Enemy Soil; Babygrande (former); Superregular (former)
- Member of: Army of the Pharaohs; Heavy Metal Kings; Jedi Mind Tricks
- Website: jmthiphop.com

Vincenzo Luviner (né Luvineri born October 5, 1977), better known as Vinnie Paz (formerly known as Ikon the Verbal Hologram), is an Italian-American rapper and producer behind the Philadelphia underground hip-hop group Jedi Mind Tricks. He is also the frontman of the hip-hop collective Army of the Pharaohs.

He released his first solo album, Season of the Assassin, in 2010. This was 18 years after Paz had originally started rapping. He released his second album God of the Serengeti in October 2012. In 2013, Paz confirmed that he was working with Army of the Pharaohs to release In Death Reborn, which was released in 2014. October 22, 2013, marked the release date of his second EP, Carry On Tradition. Paz's third solo LP, The Cornerstone of the Corner Store, was released on October 28, 2016. He released his fourth solo album, The Pain Collector, in September 2018.

== Early life ==
Paz was born in Sicily, Italy, where he lived for a short time before moving with his family to Philadelphia, Pennsylvania. He is of Sicilian/Italian heritage. He has both Italian and American citizenship.

Paz originally started rapping with fellow Jedi Mind Tricks member Stoupe in his basement.

== Career ==
=== First releases (1992–1997) ===
In 1996, Paz released the Amber Probe EP. This was the debut EP from the duo and it was released in 1996. It featured guest appearance from The Lost Children of Babylon. It was in 1997, Jedi Mind Tricks released their debut album; The Psycho-Social, Chemical, Biological & Electro-Magnetic Manipulation of Human Consciousness (often abbreviated as The Psycho-Social CD). The group only consisted of Paz and Stoupe the Enemy of Mankind at this time and featured Apathy, Jus Allah, and Black Thought.

=== From Ikon to Vinnie, forming AOTP, Violent by Design (1998–2002) ===
In 1998, Paz formed Army of the Pharaohs. Paz formed the horrorcore outfit with the original roster of Bahamadia, Chief Kamachi, Virtuoso, 7L & Esoteric, plus Jedi Mind Tricks' other members Stoupe the Enemy of Mankind and Jus Allah. The group first released the "Five Perfect Exertions" and "War Ensemble" 12" on Paz's short-lived Recordings in 1998, but then the underground supergroup remained silent for several years. Together they released The Five Perfect Exertions.

In 2000, Paz, along with Jedi Mind Tricks, released his second album, Violent by Design. Stoupe and Paz recruited New Jersey rapper Jus Allah to join them on the album, and while he was never inducted into the group, it can be assumed he became JMT's third member on the release, as his contributions were not marked as "featuring Jus Allah", while other close group affiliates such as Army of the Pharaohs members Chief Kamachi, Esoteric and Virtuoso were marked as featured guests. On the album, Ikon the Verbal Hologram changed his name to "Vinnie Paz", naming himself after Rhode Island boxer Vinny Pazienza.

=== Visions of Gandhi, Legacy of Blood and collaborations (2003–2006) ===
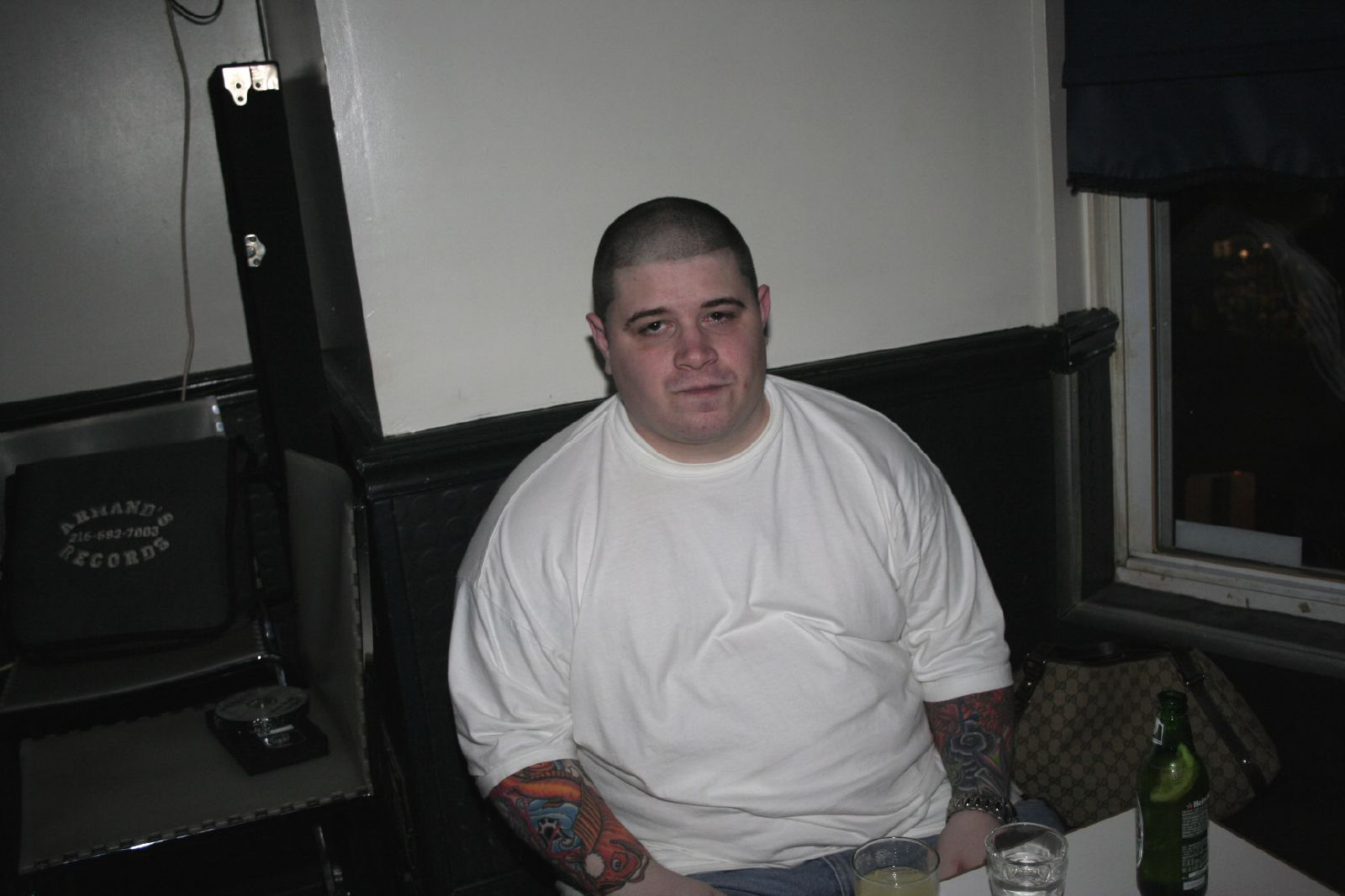
Paz in 2006

In 2003, Jedi Mind Tricks released their third studio album, Visions of Gandhi. The album title was inspired by Foxy Brown's verse on the song "Affirmative Action" from Nas' 1996 album It Was Written, in which she raps "They praise Allah with visions of Gandhi". Paz explained that it was "always something that stuck in my head but I never applied it to anything. Then I thought with everything going on in Palestine, the war with Iraq, Mumia's in jail. I just felt this is a time right now that the world and society need someone like Gandhi. So Visions of Gandhi just kind of reflects that." In the following year they released Legacy of Blood.

In 2005, Paz shifted his focus back on to the supergroup Army of the Pharaohs. They worked to release their debut album, The Torture Papers. It was released on March 21, 2006, on Babygrande Records. After the release of this Paz went back to his group Jedi Mind Tricks and worked on fifth studio album, Servants in Heaven, Kings in Hell. It was released September 19, 2006, through Babygrande Records.

In 2006, Vinnie Paz released his first solo album, The Sound & the Fury. It featured guest appearance from Apathy and OuterSpace. It was hosted by DJ Kwestion and had 19 tracks.

=== Ritual of Battle, A History of Violence, The Unholy Terror and solo career (2007–2010) ===
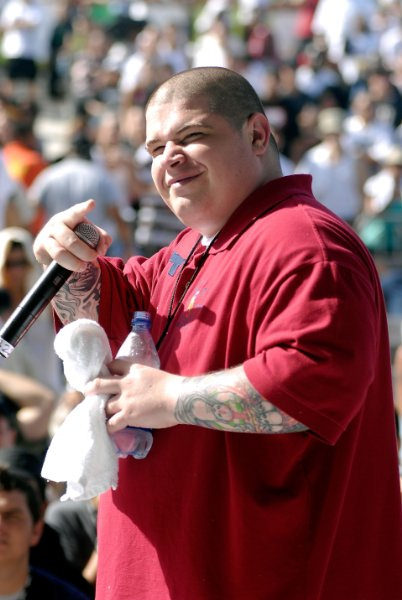
Paz in 2007

Paz got together members of Army of the Pharaohs to release their second album, Ritual of Battle. It was released September 21, 2007, on Babygrande Records. The album's first single was "Bloody Tears", featuring Planetary, Doap Nixon, Demoz, and Paz, produced by DJ Kwestion. The song was based on the Castlevania tune of the same name.

On November 11, 2008, Jedi Mind Tricks released their sixth studio album, A History of Violence. The album sold 4,451 units in its first week out. Just like most albums, it was released on Babygrande Records. The album followed multiple summer releases from the Jedi Mind Tricks camp, including the group's first DVD, titled Divine Fire: The Story of Jedi Mind Tricks, and the Vinnie Paz-executive produced projects Jedi Mind Tricks presents Doap Nixon: Sour Diesel, Jedi Mind Tricks presents King Syze: The Labor Union, and Jedi Mind Tricks presents OuterSpace: God's Fury.

In 2010, The Unholy Terror was released. It is the third studio album by Army of the Pharaohs. The release date was March 30, 2010, but the album was released early on March 19, 2010, on UGHH.com. It was released through Babygrande Records and through Paz's own Enemy Soil.

It was during this time Paz released his debut solo album, Season of the Assassin. Many critics said the album was a step forward for Paz as an artist. "Not only has he all-but perfected his grimy braggadocio, but he also exhibits unique storytelling abilities that will make critics who dismiss him as just another hardcore rapper bite their tongues clean off." said Sean Ryon, writer of HipHopDX. It was supposed to be called Assassin's Creed but Paz changed it due to legal issues with Ubisoft. The release date for the album was on June 22, 2010. A few months later, Paz released the Prayer for the Assassin EP. The EP contained four remixed tracks from Season of the Assassin and a music video for the track Keep Movin' on. It was only available for download and was released on October 26, 2010.

=== Violence Begets Violence and God of the Serengeti (2011–2012) ===
Music is different from any art form in the world, because it has the unique power to take you back to a specific moment in your life. It's probably the closest thing we have to time travel, it allows you to re-live a memory or release the emotions surrounding that memory with unparalleled detail. You could be sitting in a restaurant, driving in your car and a particular song comes on and takes you to that exact time and place in your life like no book, movie or painting could ever do. I guess that's part of the reason why I gravitated to becoming a musician; it's what made me a fan of music and what made me wanna make music in the first place. I've had fans send me mail from all over the world telling me that my music had changed their lives, help them get off drugs, or helped them get through a death of a family member. You understand how important that is to me. That's definitely the best compliment you could get as a musician. That's why I make music. Everybody says this to the point where it's a cliché but the money is secondary. I make music to move people, to inspire people. That's what I was put here to do and that's what I'm gonna continue to do.

— Paz, on his main focus of making music in promotion for God of the Serengeti.

In 2011, Jedi Mind Tricks released their seventh studio album Violence Begets Violence. It is the first JMT album without the production help of Stoupe, as Paz and Jus Allah grew tired of waiting. Paz stated; "By now you have heard that this is the first Jedi Mind Tricks album we've made without Stoupe handling the production. The bottom line is that at some point after making our last album, A History of Violence, Stoupe lost his passion for making Hip Hop and wanted to try new things. Through our career, we've always waited on him to get inspired to make a new album, but this time around we got tired of waiting out his creative drought. He tried to produce some things for this new album, but we could tell early on that his heart wasn't in making JMT records anymore. He's moved on as a producer to work in other genres with his side-projects, Dutch and Vespertina, and we've moved on with a new crop of talented producers to make the hardcore Hip Hop we've always been known for."

Paz released his second studio album, God of the Serengeti, on October 22, 2012. This effort followed up 2010's Season of the Assassin. Nick Demolina (writer of XXL), said "While Paz's raspy flow and violent imagery are generally coherent and amusing enough, there are a few head-scratchers sprinkled throughout. Such as, "I don't believe in crying at all/I'm a manic depressive—never get excited at all," and, "The bible is gone/you are watching a Viking perform," on "Cheesesteaks". While God of the Serengeti doesn't blaze any new ground, it is a release that will hold up to the Paz's legacy on the underground scene and will surely satisfy long-time fans."

=== Digital Dynasty 23, Carry On Tradition, In Death Reborn, Heavy Lies the Crown and The Thief and the Fallen (2013–present) ===
In 2013, it was announced that the Digital Dynasty would continue once more with another host from Philadelphia. Following from Digital Dynasty 22, which was hosted by Freeway, Digital Dynasty23 was hosted by Paz. It was released on January 31, 2013.

Army of the Pharaohs released two albums in 2014: In Death Reborn on April 22, 2014, and Heavy Lies the Crown on October 21, 2014.

In 2014, Stoupe returned to Jedi Mind Tricks while Jus Allah had left the group again. On June 2, 2015, they released their eighth studio album called The Thief and the Fallen, which was fully produced by Stoupe.

== Ventures ==
=== Jedi Mind Tricks ===
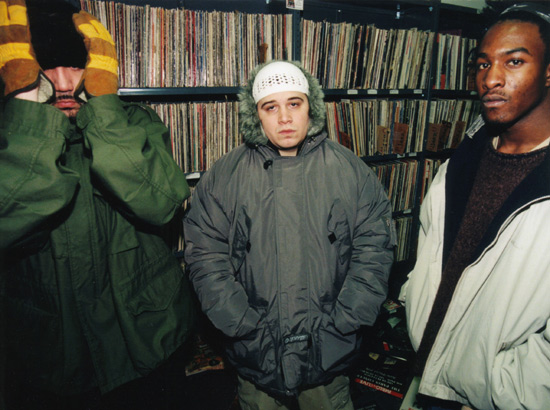
Paz (center) with Jedi Mind Tricks

Paz formed Jedi Mind Tricks with high school friend Stoupe the Enemy of Mankind, a producer and DJ also from Philadelphia, Pennsylvania, in 1993. They released their first EP in 1996 called Amber Probe through the Label Superegular Records, which featured three original tracks, two remixes and one instrumental all produced by Stoupe the Enemy of Mankind. Jedi Mind Tricks' first official album came out the following year. It was called The Psycho-Social, Chemical, Biological & Electro-Magnetic Manipulation of Human Consciousness, The Psycho-Social CD for short. The album originally sold 1000 vinyl copies through Superegular Records, but was re-released in 2003 to combine for 25,000 sales. The album focuses mostly on astronomy, history and physics.

=== Army of the Pharaohs ===
Paz formed Army of the Pharaohs, an underground East Coast hip-hop group featuring himself, Apathy, Celph Titled, Chief Kamachi, 7L & Esoteric, Planetary & Crypt the Warchild (OuterSpace), King Syze, Faez One, Jus Allah, Doap Nixon, Reef the Lost Cauze, Demoz, Block Mccloud, and Des Devious, although not every artist is on every track.

=== Heavy Metal Kings ===
Heavy Metal Kings is a group featuring veteran rappers Ill Bill and Paz. In 2006, Ill Bill was featured on the single "Heavy Metal Kings" by hip-hop duo Jedi Mind Tricks, released through Babygrande Records. The single was released in a limited edition blue vinyl pressing, with every copy signed by group vocalist Paz. The duo came together after Ill Bill was featured on Jedi Mind Tricks single titled "Heavy Metal Kings" back in 2006. The pair released their self-titled debut collaboration album in 2011, Heavy Metal Kings. More releases including Black God White Devil in 2017 and Heavy Metal Kings vs. DJ Muggs.

=== Solo albums ===
Paz released his debut solo album Season of the Assassin on June 21, 2010, which peaked at number 25 on the US Billboard rap charts. The album featured guest appearances from Paul Wall, Ill Bill, Clipse among others.

Paz was working on his second solo album God of the Serengeti, which featured production from DJ Premier, Psycho Les, C-Lance, among others. It was officially released on 22, October 2012. On June 21, Paz released the first video from the album, for the single "Cheesesteaks". The music video for "The Oracle" was released a month after the release of the album on 15, October 2012.

His second extended play titled Carry On Tradition was released on October 29, 2013, via his own Enemy Soil record label.

=== Record label ===
Paz owns an independent record label, Enemy Soil.

== Themes and personal views ==
Paz is known for his raw and gritty lyrical delivery. His lyrics frequently contain references to religion, war, politics, mythology, conspiracy theories, and the paranormal. His more recent albums such as Servants in Heaven, Kings in Hell show a more obvious approach to politics and world issues. This gritty style of Paz became apparent with the release of Violent by Design, and has become progressively more defined since its release. Paz showed support towards Ron Paul during the 2012 U.S. presidential election, and has referred to the former congressman in his lyrics.

Paz has a number of aliases, such as: "Ikon the Verbal Hologram", "Louie Doggs", "Boxcutter Pazzy", "Pack Pistol Pazzy", "Hologram", "Paz", "Vinnie P", "The Pazmanian Devil", "Odrama Vin Laden", "Ikon the Python", and "Pazienza".

Raised Catholic, Paz is now a Muslim, which plays a major role in much of his lyrics, often controversially, as on "Heavenly Divine", where he rapped "I'm with Allah 'cause he chose me, I broke into the Vatican, strangled The Pope with his rosary." Paz is also a heavy metal fan, and occasionally uses song titles and band names in JMT tracks and lyrics.

== Discography ==
Studio albums

- Season of the Assassin (2010)
- God of the Serengeti (2012)
- The Cornerstone of the Corner Store (2016)
- The Pain Collector (2018)
- As Above So Below (2020)
- Burn Everything That Bears Your Name (2021)
- Tortured in the Name of God's Unconditional Love (2022)
- All Are Guests in the House of God (2023)
- God Sent Vengeance (2025)
- You’ll Miss Me When I’m Dead (2027)

Collaborative albums

- Heavy Metal Kings (with Ill Bill as Heavy Metal Kings) (2011)
- Black God White Devil (with Ill Bill as Heavy Metal Kings) (2017)
- Camouflage Regime (with Tragedy Khadafi) (2019)
