= Jedi Mind Tricks =

American hip-hop group

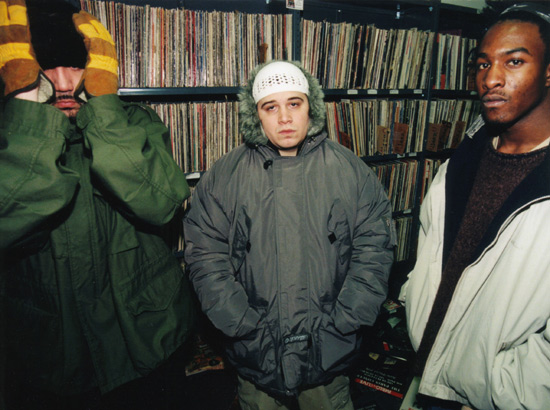
- From left to right: Stoupe the Enemy of Mankind, Vinnie Paz, Jus Allah

Background information
- Also known as: JMT
- Origin: Philadelphia, Pennsylvania, U.S.
- Genres: Underground hip-hop; conscious hip-hop; hardcore hip-hop; horrorcore
- Years active: 1996–present
- Labels: Enemy Soil; Babygrande; Superegular
- Members: Vinnie Paz; Stoupe the Enemy of Mankind; DJ Kwestion
- Past members: Jus Allah; DJ Drew Dollars
- Website: jmthiphop.com

Logo of the group

Jedi Mind Tricks (JMT) are an American underground hip-hop group from Philadelphia, founded in 1996 by two high school friends, rapper Vinnie Paz (Vincenzo Luvineri) and producer Stoupe the Enemy of Mankind (Kevin Baldwin). In 1999, rapper Jus Allah joined the group to record their second studio album, Violent by Design. Jus left the group shortly after, but returned in late 2006 and began working on the sixth studio album, A History of Violence. In 2011 Stoupe left the group because "his heart wasn't in making JMT records anymore". In 2013, Jus split from the group indefinitely, and Stoupe returned in 2015.

DJ Kwestion mainly scratches choruses on the turntable. Kwestion is also a part of the group Skratch Makaniks. Kwestion, who is the tour DJ, was a replacement for JMT's previous DJ, Drew Dollars, who is no longer affiliated with the group due to creative differences.

JMT has collaborations with both regional MCs and rap veterans, including GZA, Kool G Rap, 7L & Esoteric, Sean Price, Ras Kass, Canibus, Percee P, Killah Priest, Immortal Technique, Block McCloud, Virtuoso, Louis Logic, R.A. the Rugged Man, Tragedy Khadafi, Chief Kamachi, Necro, and Ill Bill. The group has sold over 250,000 albums in the United States and 450,000 albums worldwide, all of which were released independently.

== History ==
=== 1996–97: Amber Probe EP and Psycho-Social ===
Jedi Mind Tricks officially debuted with the Amber Probe EP.

The Psycho-Social, Chemical, Biological & Electro-Magnetic Manipulation of Human Consciousness, known as "The Psycho-Social CD" for short, was released by Superregular Recordings and was JMT's first full-length LP. It featured 12 tracks and the 2002 re-issue featured 6 bonus tracks, and included all the tracks that had appeared on the Amber Probe EP.

=== 1998–2000: Five Perfect Exertions EP and Violent by Design ===
Prior to the release of their first LP, Vinnie Paz had conceived the idea of forming a rotating, collaborative super-group of underground East Coast artists called the Army of the Pharaohs (AotP). 1998 saw the first result of these efforts in The Five Perfect Exertions EP. The release featured Virtuoso, 7L & Esoteric, Chief Kamachi and Bahamadia as well as Vinnie Paz himself. The EP was later remixed for JMT's next LP, Violent by Design (2000), albeit without Chief Kamachi's verse.

The LP was originally titled "Polymatrix: Reincarnation of the Hologramic Christ". Vinnie Paz's style became noticeably more aggressive, abandoning his cosmic, paranoid rhyme style from The Psycho-Social CD for more violent lyrics. The LP also introduced Jus Allah, a founding member of JMT who had left for college but dropped out a short while after. A self-proclaimed Five-Percenter, Jus was present on every non-AotP track on Violent by Design as JMT's unofficial third member. Violent By Design contained a mix of braggadocio and horrorcore lyrics, combining hardcore/gangsta rap styles with mythological and fantasy imagery. According to Vinnie Paz, JMT used the proceeds from The Amber Probe to buy equipment to produce Violent by Design, which was recorded entirely in Stoupe's bedroom, without a mic booth or soundproofing.

The list of guest artists on this album was also their longest, including Mr. Lif, Planetary of OuterSpace, Louis Logic, Diamondback, Philip King Rappah, Coffee Gangsta Child L-Fudge, B.A. Barakus, J-Treds, Killa Sha, C-Baz and Tragedy Khadafi, plus a couple of odd phone-call interludes by Mr. Len.

During the course of Violent by Design's 1999–2000 recording period, Paz changed his alias from Ikon the Verbal Hologram to Vinnie Paz, inspired by the boxer of the same name. The reason for this has been reported to be the result of a short-lived rivalry instigated by fellow Philly underground rapper iCON the Mic King. Vinnie Paz decided to settle on his new moniker in order to prevent any further confusion. It was also around this time that he formally declared himself to be a follower of Islam, alluding to this fact several times on record.

=== 2003: Visions of Gandhi ===
In 2003, JMT released their third LP, Visions of Gandhi. In an interview, Vinnie Paz said the title was inspired by Foxy Brown's verse in Nas's song "Affirmative Action", and expresses the need for a prominent figure of non-violent social change such as Gandhi in a post-9/11 world. Stoupe, now supplied with a professional studio in New York, also expanded his variety of production, incorporating grand orchestral samples and a stronger Latin feel. In response, some longtime fans felt let down by Vinnie Paz's lyricism and delivery, as well as the abundance of slick, upbeat loops adopted by Stoupe. Nevertheless, the album helped expand the group's audience as its popularity and commercial success continued to grow. Despite the album's reference to Gandhi, its lyrics were violent and homophobic, with Pitchfork panning the album as "an awkward mix of murder rap and the shiniest boom-bap money can buy." The review also criticized Stoupe's production, claiming that the "mysteriously upbeat" tracks clashed with Vinnie Paz's horrorcore lyrics.

=== 2004–06: Legacy of Blood and Servants in Heaven, Kings in Hell ===
A little over a year after Visions of Gandhi, JMT released Legacy of Blood, this time intentionally keeping guest artists to a minimum. Vinnie Paz also added a more personal aspect to his lyrics, most notably in the last song "Before the Great Collapse," which was written as a suicide note to his mother.

In February 2005, Babygrande announced that Jus Allah had signed on to the label after reconciling with his former partners. Babygrande released his long-awaited debut LP, All Fates Have Changed, in May of that year. However, after a dispute with label CEO Chuck Wilson soon after the album's release, Jus left Babygrande and denied any new association with JMT.

In March 2006, a reunited Army of the Pharaohs released The Torture Papers LP. The crew now consisted of Vinnie Paz, Chief Kamachi, 7L & Esoteric, Apathy, Celph Titled, Planetary & Crypt the Warchild of Outerspace, King Syze, Faez One, Reef the Lost Cauze, and new Jedi Mind Tricks hype-man Des Devious. This time, however, Virtuoso and Bahamadia were not featured and were no longer associated with AotP.

The fifth Jedi Mind Tricks album, titled Servants in Heaven, Kings in Hell, was released on September 19, 2006. The release coincided with the beginning of a tour to promote the album, which kicked off in New York City's Times Square. The album was widely acclaimed, unlike the group's two previous albums. A large part of the acclaim was due to the album's lyrical and musical diversity, both missing from their previous efforts. The album featured the single "Heavy Metal Kings" with Ill Bill, the Shara Worden-assisted "Razorblade Salvation", and the storytelling track "Uncommon Valor: A Vietnam Story" with R.A. the Rugged Man. A day after the release of the album, Vinnie Paz of Jedi Mind Tricks did an interview with The Breakdown, a show on ItsHipHop.tv where he discussed the album and his thoughts on Jus Allah.

In early 2006, rumors spread that the group had reunited with estranged member Jus Allah, and that he would be featured on Servants in Heaven, Kings in Hell, but no collaboration appeared. However, on September 20, 2006, a newly recorded Jedi Mind Tricks/Jus Allah collaboration, produced by Brods and entitled "The Rebuilding," appeared online. In a January 2007 interview, Paz stated that Jus would be featured on the group's upcoming sixth album, titled A History of Violence. Jus Allah, Doap Nixon and Demoz were added to the AotP roster in 2007, and contributed verses to the group's second studio album Ritual of Battle, which was released on September 25, 2007. Also, in summer 2008, Jedi Mind Tricks' Label, Babygrande, released a JMT DVD called "Divine Fire: The Story of Jedi Mind Tricks".

=== 2007–09: Reunion with Jus Allah and A History of Violence ===
In an interview conducted in September 2007 on the Art of Rhyme website, Jus Allah announced that he has rejoined Jedi Mind Tricks. In the interview, he stated "I'm back in the group [and that] I'm focused on... putting out the next Jedi Mind Tricks album... a History of Violence." A History of Violence was released on November 11, 2008. It would be the last JMT album released on Babygrande Records.

=== 2010–13: Enemy Soil, Violence Begets Violence, departure of Stoupe and Jus Allah ===
After a long time dispute with Babygrande Records, JMT decided to part ways and form their own record label entitled Enemy Soil. Enemy Soil features artists such as JMT, Reef the Lost Cauze, Dutch (the side group of Stoupe The Enemy of Mankind), and Army of the Pharaohs.

Vinnie Paz released his first solo album Season of the Assassin on June 22, 2010. Jus Allah is in the works of releasing his second solo album entitled MMA (Meanest Man Alive). Stoupe released the album for his group, Dutch, (which features Liz Fullerton on vocals) entitled A Bright Cold Day on June 8, 2010. Army of the Pharaohs released their third album as well entitled The Unholy Terror on March 30, 2010.

It was announced that JMT would be creating a new title called Violence Begets Violence. This album marks the first album without Stoupe behind production. Vinnie Paz stated in a blog on the JMT website that Stoupe has lost the inspiration for Hip-Hop and decided to focus on other things in his career, such as his sidegroups, and that Stoupe would not be producing any of the tracks on the new JMT album. Vinnie Paz stated that there is no conflict between the two and if Stoupe wants to be part of the next album, Paz would welcome him back. JMT has since gotten numerous producers to fill in the slot and released a new single from the album entitled "Target Practice". The new album was released on October 25, 2011.

In November 2013, one of the first acts on Stoupe's new production company, Bad Tape Music, Red Martina released their debut Intransit with Stoupe as the producer on all thirteen tracks. Other band members are rapper Noesis (from Philadelphia Slick), multi-instrumentalist Ish Quintero, and vocalist Hayley Cass.

Jus Allah had left the group along with leaving the supergroup Army of the Pharaohs. The reason for his departure has not been disclosed.

=== 2014–18: Return of Stoupe, The Thief and the Fallen and The Bridge and the Abyss ===
On November 7, 2014, JMTHIPHOP.com confirmed Stoupe's return to Jedi Mind Tricks. On November 27, 2014, a post on jmthiphop.com revealed that Vinnie Paz and Stoupe would be returning as Jedi Mind Tricks in 2015.

Their album The Thief and the Fallen was released on June 2, 2015.

Vinnie Paz mentioned numerous times in 2016 on his podcast, "Broad Street Breakdown", that he and Stoupe were working on another Jedi Mind Tricks record.

The ninth studio album The Bridge and the Abyss was released on June 22, 2018.

=== 2019–now: Vinnie Paz albums and The Funeral and the Raven ===
From 2019, Vinnie Paz released several studio albums, including Camouflage Regime with Tragedy Khadafi.

On November 19, 2021, Jedi Mind Tricks released their tenth studio album, The Funeral and the Raven, which was fully produced by Stoupe.

== Members ==
=== Current members ===
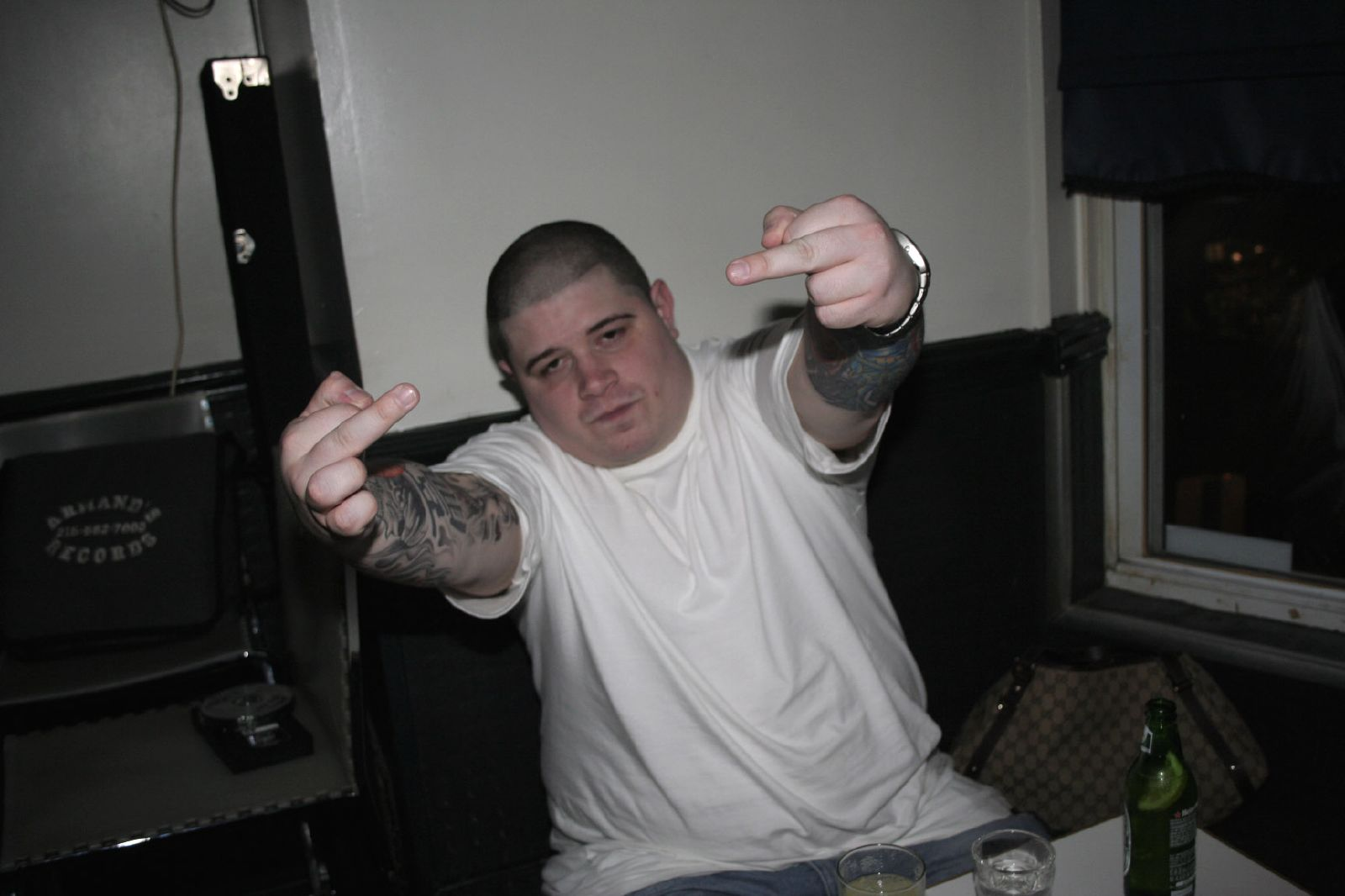
Vinnie Paz in 2006

- Vinnie Paz – vocals (1996–present)
- Stoupe the Enemy of Mankind – Producer (1996–2011, 2014–present)
- DJ Kwestion – DJ (1997–present)

=== Former members ===
- Jus Allah – vocals (1998–2001, 2006–2013)
- DJ Drew Dollars – DJ (1996–1997)

== Discography ==
Studio albums

- The Psycho-Social, Chemical, Biological & Electro-Magnetic Manipulation of Human Consciousness (1997)
- Violent by Design (2000)
- Visions of Gandhi (2003)
- Legacy of Blood (2004)
- Servants in Heaven, Kings in Hell (2006)
- A History of Violence (2008)
- Violence Begets Violence (2011)
- The Thief and the Fallen (2015)
- The Bridge and the Abyss (2018)
- The Funeral and the Raven (2021)
