= Jus Allah =

American rapper (born 1978)

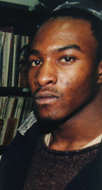

Background information
- Also known as: The Black Man; Megatraum; The Ominous; The Goat; King Justine
- Born: James Bostick; June 30, 1978 (age 48); Camden, New Jersey, U.S.
- Genres: Hip hop; hardcore
- Years active: 1993–present
- Labels: Enemy Soil; Babygrande; Omnipotent; Superegular

James Bostick (born June 30, 1978), better known by his stage name Jus Allah, is an American rapper known for being a former member of Philadelphia-based hip hop groups Jedi Mind Tricks (JMT) and Army of the Pharaohs (AOTP).

He was involved in JMT since the early days but left before the recording of their first album The Psycho-Social, Chemical, Biological & Electro-Magnetic Manipulation of Human Consciousness, only to rejoin the group a couple years later. He made his official debut on Jedi Mind Tricks' second album, Violent by Design, in 2000.

Jus Allah is known for his aggressive lyrics and Afrocentric subject matter, frequently making references to Five Percenters. He often used a multi-syllabic rhyming technique in Violent by Design and his debut solo album, All Fates Have Changed. In later years he switched his delivery to a more aggressive, deeper and raspier style, most noticeable in JMT albums such as A History of Violence and Violence Begets Violence. Jus Allah's involvement in Jedi Mind Tricks has sometimes been tense, resulting in him leaving and rejoining the group several times.

== Career ==
=== 1993–2000: Early days, Jedi Mind Tricks ===
Jus Allah collaborated with Jedi Mind Tricks as early as 1994, under the Soulcraft moniker and the Onesoul Productions banner. Due to this, he is revered as a co-founding member of the group. The earliest known recorded song with JMT is "Skinny Paz vs Vinnie Paz", which is collected as one of the Soulcraft bonus tracks on the 2003 Babygrande reissue of JMT's The Psycho-Social CD. However, Jus took some time away from music in the mid-1990s to attend college, which is largely the reason for his disappearance on the first JMT LP and the formation of their indie label, Superegular Recordings.

The year 2000 saw what the release of the classic Jedi Mind Tricks album Violent by Design, regarded by many JMT fans as featuring Jus Allah's best work. As the unofficial third member of the group, Jus Allah rapped on almost every track with frontman Vinnie Paz, often trading verses organically with one another. During this era, the three JMT members all had different aliases: "Ikon the Hologram" (Paz), "Megatraum" (Jus), and "The Enemy of Mankind" (Stoupe). All but Stoupe later dropped these aliases.

=== 2001–2006: Leaving Jedi Mind Tricks, All Fates Have Changed ===
Shortly after the release of Violent by Design, Jus left the group amid uncertainty over JMT's new association with Babygrande Records. He then went on to start his solo career at rapper Virtuoso's label, Omnipotent Records. In 2005, after releasing a single ("White Nightmare"/"G-O-D") and being part of Omnipotent's lineup for Era of the Titans, Vol. 1, Jus left the label and subsequently joined Babygrande, re-associating himself with JMT. It was on this label he recorded his first solo album, All Fates Have Changed, which included the single and B-side from his previous label as bonus tracks. The biggest collaboration of his solo career was featured on this album, with GZA from the Wu-Tang Clan lending a guest verse to "Pool of Blood." However, due to a dispute with label CEO Chuck Wilson over the album, Jus quit the label and left before completing it, at the same time disassociating any newfound JMT connection, and leaving the label to release the album on its own. Jus later stated in interviews that he had never given his approval for the album to be released, and was unsatisfied with the production. This marks the end of the rapper's "Megatraum" era.

In early 2006, an album called Necronomicon was released featuring both Jus and Boston rapper Bomshot as hip-hop duo The Devil'z Rejects. Jus stated that he had absolutely nothing to do with the album, and that he was not being paid for it. The new verses on the album were most likely old, unreleased recordings from his prior label Omnipotent Records, where Bomshot was also an artist. At some point after The Devil'z Rejects was proven to be a sham, Jus released a mixtape entitled, Bomshot is a Faggot, featuring multiple rare songs and remixes.

=== 2006–2013: Reunion with Jedi Mind Tricks ===
In 2006, Jus reunited with his former group Jedi Mind Tricks and released their first collaborative track in five years, titled "The Rebuilding", as an exclusive, online-only MySpace download. In an interview conducted in September 2007 on the Art of Rhyme website, Jus Allah announced that he had rejoined Jedi Mind Tricks, saying he was "cool with Vinnie [Paz] again." He added that he had rejoined Babygrande, and that he had put the "All Fates Have Changed" fiasco behind him.

Following his re-induction into the group as an official member, Jus was added to the Army of the Pharaohs' lineup in 2007, solidifying a spot on their second studio album, Ritual of Battle. In 2008, Jedi Mind Tricks, now reunited with the original three-member lineup of Stoupe, Vinnie Paz, and Jus Allah, released their sixth album A History of Violence. Following Enemy Soil's creative streak, AOTP released their third album, The Unholy Terror, which featured Jus. Finally, while selecting beats for the next JMT album, Paz & Jus became frustrated with what they described as Stoupe's lack of participation and focus on his side projects, and decided to release 2011's Violence Begets Violence without his involvement. Outside production was handled mostly by newcomer C-Lance, whom Paz had hired to the label after hearing his talent from a beat CD. This was to be the last Enemy Soil project that featured Jus Allah.

=== 2013–present: Departure from Enemy Soil, MMA, Diabolic ===
In 2013, Jus Allah left Jedi Mind Tricks again, as well as leaving the Army of the Pharaohs. The reason for his departure has not been disclosed, but is rumored to be beefs with in-house producer C-Lance and Heavy Metal Kings' affiliate Slaine, as well as tensions between Jus and Paz over the struggles.

M.M.A. (Meanest Man Alive) was originally announced to be released November 26, 2013. However, on November 25, 2013, Jus Allah tweeted that the album was pushed back again. With his departure from Jedi Mind Tricks and Army of the Pharaohs, this meant that ties with Enemy Soil had been severed, thus leaving him unsigned.

On August 14, 2015, the album cover, track list and pre-order for M.M.A. (Meanest Man Alive) were published on Jus Allah's Tumblr and it was released on September 4, 2015.

In 2019, Jus Allah released a diss track targeting battle rapper Diabolic. Diabolic then responded with a diss track of his own entitled "Carlton Banks (Jus Allah RIP)"

On October 31, 2022, Jus Allah released a six-track album, Forces at Play, featuring D.V Alias Khryst and Mic King. It received a positive review from Insomniac Magazine, which wrote that "the vet emcee unleashes supreme lyricism over hard hitting audio aesthetics on this impactful platter."

== Influences ==
Jus Allah has cited EPMD and A Tribe Called Quest as among his favorite groups, saying they inspired him to become involved in hip-hop. He also said the Wu-Tang Clan's aggressive delivery influenced his style.

== Discography ==
=== Solo albums ===
- All Fates Have Changed (Babygrande Records – 2005)
- M.M.A. (Meanest Man Alive) (2015)
- Forces at Play - EP (2022)
- Fire & Blood (2023)

=== Compilation albums ===
- The Best of Jus Allah (2016)

=== Group albums ===
- Jedi Mind Tricks, Violent by Design (Superegular Recordings – 2000)
- Jedi Mind Tricks, Violent by Design – Deluxe Edition (Babygrande Records – 2004)
- The Devilz Rejects, Necronomicon (Dynasty Muzik – 2006)
- The Devilz Rejects, Necromonicon – Limited Edition (Dynasty Muzik – 2007)
- Army of the Pharaohs, Ritual of Battle (Babygrande Records – 2007)
- Jedi Mind Tricks, A History of Violence (Babygrande Records – 2008)
- Army of the Pharaohs, The Unholy Terror (Babygrande Records / Enemy Soil Records – 2010)
- Jedi Mind Tricks, Violence Begets Violence (Enemy Soil Records – October 25, 2011).

=== Appears on ===
- Jedi Mind Tricks, "Get This Low" (Superegular Recordings – 1993)
- Jedi Mind Tricks, "Heavenly Divine" 12" (Superegular Recordings – 1999)
- Vinnie Paz, "Raw Is War" 12" (Superegular Recordings – 2000)
- Jedi Mind Tricks, "Genghis Khan" 12" (Superegular Recordings – 2000)
- Jedi Mind Tricks, "Retaliation" 12" (Superegular Recordings – 2001)
- Virtuoso, World War I: The Voice Of Reason LP (Brick Records – 2001)
- Army of the Pharaohs, Rare Shit, Collabos & Freestyles (Compilation mix CD) (N/A – 2003)
- Omnipotent Records, Era of the Titans: Vol. 1 (Omnipotent Records – 2004)
- 7L & Esoteric, Moment of Rarities (Babygrande Records – 2005)
- Bomshot, Kill Em All: The Worst of Bomshot Vol. 1 (Leedz Edutainment – 2005)
- Blue Sky Black Death, A Heap of Broken Images (Mush Records – 2006)
- Chan, "Politickin' Vol. 1 Album" (Dynasty Muzik – 2006)
- Snowgoons, German Lugers (Babygrande Records – 2007)
- iCON the Mic King, "Black Arts" 12" (Indieground Records – 2007)
- King Syze, "Collective Bargaining" (2011)
- Poetic Death, "Shakespeare's Science" (2011)
- Madecipha, "Terrible Things" (2011)
- King Magnetic, "Everything's A Gamble Vol. 3" (2012)
- Vinnie Paz, "God of the Serengeti" (Enemy Soil – 2012)
- Ill Bill, "The Grimy Awards" (Uncle Howie Records – 2013)
- Snowgoons, "Raps of the Titans" (Welcome to the Goondox – 2013)
- Madecipha, "War Zone" (2014)
- Le S'1DROM + Army of the Pharaohs, "Army of Bastardz" (2014)
- Mr. Green, "Live From The Streets" (Duck Down Music – 2015)
- Steven Gaines, "Mr. Gaines" (2016)
