= JuJu Mob =

American hip-hop group

- Also known as: Chief Kamachi & The JuJu Mob, JJM
- Origin: Philadelphia, Pennsylvania
- Genres: Underground hip-hop
- Years active: 2004–2007; 2015–present
- Label: legends
- Members: Chief Kamachi; Reef the Lost Cauze; Charon Don; State Store

The JuJu Mob (originally credited as Chief Kamachi & The JuJu Mob) is a four-member underground hip-hop group originating from Philadelphia, Pennsylvania that was founded in 2004. The four founding members of the JuJu Mob are Reef the Lost Cauze, Chief Kamachi, Charon Don and State Store.

== Career ==
=== Beginnings (2003–2004) ===
Before the formation of the group, members of Juju Mob had been known for their frequent collaborations on each other's albums. It was only in 2004 that Chief Kamachi decided that they should form together to work as a group. Charon Don, Reef the Lost Cauze and State Store were all fond of the idea and in the end; JuJu Mob was formed.

=== No Chorus/My Squad (2005) ===
Initially, the group released their first two single No Chorus & My Squad. This however was released as a 12-inch vinyl and featured production work from DJ Mighty Mi, DJ Kwestion, E. Dan, Franchise, Eyego and was released via Good Hands Records & Eastern Conference Records.

=== Black Candles and hiatus of the group (2005–2007) ===
Black Candles was the first studio album released by JuJu Mob. It was released shortly after the No Chorus Vinyl on May 17, 2005. It was announced that JuJu Mob would be working on their second studio album, released in 2007, however the group announced that they would be working on their solo careers and other work. Reef the Lost Cauze worked on albums along with Army of the Pharaohs and Snowgoons.

=== Chief Kamachi feud with Army of the Pharaohs (2008–2011) ===
In 2008, Kamachi left Army of the Pharaohs (an underground super-group of which he and Reef were members) and released a diss track titled "First Warning" taking aim at the group's founder Vinnie Paz of Jedi Mind Tricks and member Apathy. According to Apathy, it started over an email Apathy didn't respond to from Kamachi. What was written in the e-mail hasn't been disclosed. In a 2008 interview which has in parts or its entirety circulated on the internet since, Kamachi cites personal resentment towards Apathy as the reason for their feud and him leaving AOTP, but also the fact that Paz didn't invite Kamachi on AOTP tours, even though he is a founding member.

In October 2011, Reef spoke out saying, "From day one, anyone will tell you when they ask you how I've been about the beef, I've always been like, 'Yo this shit's whack, I just want it to stop,'" he said. "I always use this analogy that literally for me, it's like a little brother caught between older brothers fighting (..) I just wish everyone would make peace and keep it moving. We're older, we have lives, we have kids and I just wish that everyone could sit down and have some beers and smoke and eat and make peace." The feud has died down but both sides still haven't come to an agreement.

=== Reformation of the group and #777 (2012-Present) ===
In late 2012, it was announced that there could be a possibility of the group reforming; however, it wasn't confirmed until 2013 by Chief Kamachi. On November 1, 2013, Chief Kamachi shared via his Facebook page that a new JuJu Mob album is on the way. It is rumoured to be called #777 after a single Kamachi released on July 2, 2013 titled "777" It is likely to be their second studio album.

== Discography ==
=== Albums ===
- Black Candles (Emm / Eastern Conference, May 17, 2005)
- #777 (TBA)

=== Singles ===
- "No Chorus" (Vinyl Single) (Emm / Eastern Conference, April 19, 2005)
