= Inspectah Deck discography =

This is the discography of American rapper Inspectah Deck.

== Studio albums ==
List of studio albums, with selected chart positions, sales figures and certifications
| Title | Album details | Peak chart positions | | |
| Title | Album details | US | US R&B | US Rap |
|---|---|---|---|---|
| Uncontrolled Substance | Released: October 5, 1999 (US); Label: Loud Records; Formats: CD, LP, digital download, streaming | 19 | 3 | — |
| The Movement | Released: June 10, 2003 (US); Label: Koch Records; Formats: CD, LP, digital download, streaming | 137 | 29 | — |
| The Resident Patient | Released: July 25, 2006 (US); Label: Urban Icon Records; Formats: CD, LP, digital download, streaming | — | — | — |
| Manifesto | Released: March 23, 2010 (US); Label: Traffic Entertainment; Formats: CD, LP, digital download, streaming | — | 69 | — |
| Chamber No. 9 | Released: July 12, 2019; Label: Traffic Entertainment; Formats: CD, LP, digital download, streaming | — | — | — |
| Dragon's Breath | Released: August 7, 2026; Label: Urban Icon Records, DNA Music Group; Formats: Digital download, streaming | — | — | — |
"—" denotes a title that did not chart, or was not released in that territory.

== Collaboration albums ==
List of collaboration albums, with selected chart positions
| Year | Title | Label | Formats | Peak chart positions | | | | | | Notes |
| Year | Title | Label | Formats | US | US R&B/HH | US Rap | US Ind. | US Heat. | US Taste | Notes |
|---|---|---|---|---|---|---|---|---|---|---|
| 2013 | Czarface | Brick Records | CD, LP, cassette, digital download | — | 34 | 20 | 45 | — | — | |
| 2015 | Every Hero Needs a Villain | Brick Records | CD, LP, cassette, digital download | — | 15 | 15 | 19 | 4 | 15 | |
| 2016 | A Fistful of Peril | Silver Age | CD, LP, digital download | — | 21 | 14 | 28 | 8 | — | |
| 2017 | First Weapon Drawn | Silver Age | LP, digital download | — | — | — | 44 | 16 | — | |
| 2018 | Czarface Meets Metal Face | Silver Age | CD, LP, cassette, digital download | 134 | — | — | 5 | 1 | 5 | Recorded with MF Doom |
| 2019 | Czarface Meets Ghostface | Silver Age | CD, LP, cassette, digital download | — | — | — | 8 | — | 4 | Recorded with Ghostface Killah |
| 2019 | Double Dose of Danger | Silver Age | LP, digital download | — | — | — | — | — | — | |
| 2019 | The Odd Czar Against Us | Silver Age | CD, LP, digital download | — | — | — | — | — | — | |
| 2021 | Super What? | Silver Age | CD, LP, cassette, digital download | — | — | — | — | — | — | Recorded with MF Doom |
| 2021 | Czar Noir | Silver Age | LP | — | — | — | — | — | — | |
| 2022 | Czarmageddon! | Silver Age | CD, LP | 178 | — | — | 26 | 1 | — | |
| 2023 | Czartificial Intelligence | Silver Age | CD, LP | — | — | — | — | 7 | — | |

=== Mixtapes ===
List of mixtapes, with year released
| Title | Mixtape details |
|---|---|
| The Resident Patient 2 | Released: 2008; Label: Self-released; Formats: Digital download |
| Cynthia's Son | Released: November 5, 2014; Label: Self-released; Formats: Digital download |

=== Singles ===
List of singles, with selected chart positions and certifications, showing year released and album name
| Title | Year | Peak chart positions | | | Album |
| Title | Year | US | US R&B | US Rap | Album |
|---|---|---|---|---|---|
| "REC Room" | 1998 | — | — | 28 | Uncontrolled Substance |
| "Forget Me Not" | 1999 | — | — | — | Uncontrolled Substance |
| "Word on the Street" | 1999 | — | — | — | Uncontrolled Substance |
| "Show N Prove (Power of God)" | 2000 | — | — | 34 | Uncontrolled Substance |
| "Movas & Shakers" | 2000 | — | — | — | Uncontrolled Substance |
| "The Movement" | 2003 | — | — | — | The Movement |
| "City High" | 2003 | — | — | — | The Movement |
| "Bumpin' and Grindin'" | 2003 | — | — | — | The Movement |
| "Vendetta" | 2003 | — | — | — | The Movement |
| "Big City" | 2003 | — | — | — | The Movement |
| "He's a Rebel" | 2003 | — | — | — | —N/a |
| "The Champion" | 2010 | — | — | — | Manifesto |
"—" denotes a recording that did not chart or was not released in that territory.

=== Guest appearances ===
List of non-single guest appearances, with other performing artists, showing year released and album name
| Title | Year | Other artist(s) | Album |
|---|---|---|---|
| "Mr. Sandman" | 1994 | Method Man, RZA, Streetlife, Carlton Fisk, Blue Raspberry | Tical |
| "Let Me at 'Em" | 1995 | —N/a | Tales from the Hood (soundtrack) |
| "Guillotine (Swordz)" | 1995 | Raekwon, GZA, Ghostface Killah | Only Built 4 Cuban Linx... |
| "Cold World" | 1995 | GZA | Liquid Swords |
| "Duel of the Iron Mic" | 1995 | GZA, Ol' Dirty Bastard, Masta Killa | Liquid Swords |
| "Assassination Day" | 1996 | Ghostface Killah, RZA, Raekwon, Masta Killa | Ironman |
| "Semi-Automatic: Rap Full Metal Jacket" | 1996 | U-God, Streetlife | High School High (soundtrack) |
| "Tres Leches (Triboro Trilogy)" | 1998 | Big Pun, Prodigy | Capital Punishment |
| "Cross My Heart" | 1998 | Killah Priest, GZA | Heavy Mental / Caught Up (soundtrack) |
| "Above the Clouds" | 1998 | Gang Starr | Moment of Truth |
| "Wu-Tang Cream Team Line Up" | 1998 | Funkmaster Flex, Raekwon, Harlem Hoodz, Killa Sin, Method Man | 60 Minutes of Funk Vol. III |
| "One More to Go (The Earthquake)" | 1998 | Deadly Venoms, GZA, Method Man, Streetlife, Cappadonna | Antidote |
| "S.O.S." | 1998 | Streetlife | Wu-Tang Killa Bees: The Swarm |
| "Execute Them" | 1998 | Raekwon, Streetlife, Masta Killa | Wu-Tang Killa Bees: The Swarm |
| "Tru Master" | 1998 | Pete Rock, Kurupt | Soul Survivor |
| "Play IV Keeps" | 1998 | Method Man, Hell Razah, Mobb Deep, Streetlife | Tical 2000: Judgement Day |
| "Spazzola" | 1998 | Method Man, Masta Killa, Streetlife, Killa Sin, Raekwon | Tical 2000: Judgement Day |
| "Who's Gonna Cry (No Exit Part 2, The Infamous Hip Rock Version)" | 1999 | Blondie, Mobb Deep, U-God | Non-album single |
| "Rumble" | 1999 | U-God, Method Man | Golden Arms Redemption |
| "Speaking Real Words" | 1999 | 7L & Esoteric | EP |
| "The Authentic (Street)" | 2000 | Ruthless Bastards | Non-album single |
| "Verbal Slaughter" | 2000 | The Dwellas | The Last Shall Be First |
| "Make Cents" | 2001 | I.G.T. | Non-album single |
| "X (Y'all Know the Name)" | 2002 | X-Ecutioners, Pharoahe Monch, Skillz, Xzibit | Built from Scratch |
| "Sparring Minds" | 2002 | GZA | Legend of the Liquid Sword |
| "Killa Beez" | 2002 | RZA, U-God, Suga Bang Bang, Blue Raspberry | Wu-Tang Killa Beez: The Sting |
| "Get Away from the Door" | 2002 | Cappadonna | The Struggle |
| "Always NY" | 2003 | Mathematics | Love, Hell or Right |
| "Musketeers of Pig Alley" | 2003 | Raekwon, Masta Killa | The Lex Diamond Story |
| "Street Rap" | 2003 | Mareko | White Sunday |
| "Silverbacks" | 2004 | Masta Killa, GZA | No Said Date |
| "A Star Is Born" | 2005 | Streetlife | Street Education |
| "A Ha (Remix)" | 2005 | Mos Def | Tale #10 |
| "Strawberries & Cream" | 2005 | Mathematics, Ghostface Killah, RZA | The Problem |
| "Spot Lite" | 2005 | Mathematics, Method Man, U-God, Cappadonna | The Problem |
| "Move Unheard" | 2006 | Cappadonna, Joe Young | Cash & Grams |
| "Everything" | 2006 | Method Man, Streetlife | 4:21... The Day After |
| "Street Corner" | 2006 | Masta Killa, GZA | Made in Brooklyn |
| "Piece of the Pie" | 2007 | Pop Shuvit | Freakshow Vol 1 : Tales of The Travelling Tunes |
| "I Don't Wanna Go Back" | 2007 | Joe Young | Gorilla Street Gang |
| "You Can't Stop Me Now" | 2008 | RZA | Digi Snacks |
| "You Already Know" | 2009 | Kool G Rap, Suga Bang Bang | The RZA Presents: Afro Samurai Resurrection OST |
| "Kill Too Hard" | 2009 | U-God, Masta Ace | Wu-Tang Chamber Music |
| "Harbor Masters" | 2009 | Ghostface Killah, AZ | Wu-Tang Chamber Music |
| "Sound the Horns" | 2009 | Sadat X, U-God | Wu-Tang Chamber Music |
| "Symphonies" | 2009 | Phil Anastasia | The Symphony |
| "House of Flying Daggers" | 2009 | Raekwon, Ghostface Killah, Method Man, GZA | Only Built 4 Cuban Linx... Pt. II |
| "Black Mozart" | 2009 | Raekwon | Only Built 4 Cuban Linx... Pt. II |
| "Mean Streets" | 2009 | Raekwon, Ghostface Killah, Suga Bang Bang | Only Built 4 Cuban Linx... Pt. II |
| "Kiss the Ring" | 2009 | Raekwon, Masta Killa | Only Built 4 Cuban Linx... Pt. II |
| "Rockstars" | 2009 | Raekwon, GZA | Only Built 4 Cuban Linx... Pt. II |
| "Gunshowers" | 2010 | Method Man, Ghostface Killah, Sun God | Wu-Massacre |
| "12th Chamber" | 2010 | 7L & Esoteric | 1212 |
| "Chop Chop Ninja" | 2011 | Raekwon | Shaolin vs. Wu-Tang |
| "Never Feel This Pain" | 2011 | U-God, Tre Williams | Legendary Weapons |
| "The Road" | 2011 | Masta Killa, Bronze Nazareth | School for the Blindman |
| "Put God First" | 2011 | Cappadonna, Solomon Childs | The Pilgrimage |
| "Honeys Look Good" | 2011 | Cappadonna | The Pilgrimage |
| "Something Higher" | 2011 | Lee Bannon | Fantastic Plastic |
| "How You Do That" | 2012 | Illmaculate, OnlyOne | Skrill Talk |
| "Chairmen of da Barz" | 2012 | Two Tungs, Spleen | 2000 and Now or Never |
| "Different Times Zones" | 2012 | Ghostface Killah, Sheek Louch | Wu Block |
| "Bust Shots" | 2012 | Ghostface Killah, Sheek Louch | Wu Block |
| "Get Live" | 2013 | Dynasty | Beyond Measure |
| "Devotion to the Saints" | 2013 | Killah Priest, Ghostface Killah | The Psychic World of Walter Reed |
| "Blood on the Cobblestones" | 2013 | Ghostface Killah, U-God | Twelve Reasons to Die |
| "Murder Spree" | 2013 | Ghostface Killah, Masta Killa, U-God, Killa Sin | Twelve Reasons to Die |
| "An Unexpected Call (The Set Up)" | 2013 | Ghostface Killah | Twelve Reasons to Die |
| "Astonishing" | 2013 | Marco Polo, Large Pro, O.C., Tragedy | PA2: Director's Cut |
| "4 Horsemen" | 2013 | Mathematics, Ghostface Killah, Method Man, Raekwon | The Answer |
| "Mt. Everest" | 2013 | U-God, eLZhi | The Keynote Speaker |
| "The Colosseum" | 2014 | A-Villa, Big K.R.I.T. | Carry on Tradition |
| "Another Time" | 2015 | DJ EFN, Bernz, M.O.P. | Another Time |
| "The Purple Tape" | 2015 | Method Man, Raekwon | The Meth Lab |
| "The Industry RMX 2" | 2015 | Large Pro, Roc Marciano, Cormega, | Re:Living |
| "These Broken Wings" | 2015 | Shalé, DJ Revolution, Mike Smith, Jonathan Hay, King Tech | When Music Worlds Collide |
| "Hip Hop Never Left" | 2016 | Psycho Les, Pete Rock, Jeru the Damaja | Dank God, Volume 1 |
| "Clans & Clicks" | 2017 | Sean Price, Smif-N-Wessun, Rock, Raekwon, Method Man, Foul Monday, Nottz | Imperius Rex |
| "Tiger and the Mantis" | 2017 | Masta Killa, GZA | Loyalty Is Royalty |
| "Representin' Lovely" | 2018 | Solomon Childs, Tone Spliff, Realio Sparkzwell | The Prophet and the King |
| "Epicenter" | 2018 | U-God, Raekwon | Venom |
| "Burner to Burner" | 2019 | Ghostface Killah, Cappadonna | Ghostface Killahs |
| "Rain on Snow" | 2019 | DJ Shadow, Raekwon, Ghostface KIllah | Our Pathetic Age |
| "E.K.N.Y." | 2020 | R.A. The Rugged Man | All My Heroes Are Dead |
| "Unpredictable" | 2023 | Statik Selektah | Round Trip |
| "Victory" | 2024 | El Camino | They Spit on Jesus |
| "The Man with the Iron Darts" | 2024 | Cappadona, Masta KIlla | The Man with the Iron Darts |
| "Lay Me Down" | 2024 | Diamond D | Diam Piece 3: Initium |
| "Hero" | 2024 | Masta Ace and Marco Polo | Richmond Hill |
| "Play Amongst the Stars" | 2024 | Flee Lord, Crisis | Full Court Press |
| "Pomogranite" | 2025 | Raekwon, Carlton Fiske | The Emperor's New Clothes |

=== Production credits ===
1995

Wu-Tang Clan - Tales from the Hood The Soundtrack

- "Let Me at Them"

1997

Wu-Tang Clan - Wu-Tang Forever

- "Visionz"

1998

Inspectah Deck & Streetlife - Wu-Tang Killa Bees: The Swarm

- "S.O.S."

Method Man - Tical 2000: Judgement Day

- "Spazzola"
- "Elements"

RZA - Bobby Digital in Stereo

- "Kiss of a Black Widow"

1999

GZA - Beneath The Surface

- "Beneath the Surface"

Inspectah Deck - Uncontrolled Substance

- "Femme Fatale"
- "Word on the Street"
- "Elevation"
- "Hyperdermix"
- "The Cause"

U-God - Golden Arms Redemption

- "Glide"

2000

Ghostface Killah - Supreme Clientele

- "Stay True" {beat taken from "Elevation"}

2001

Cappadonna - The Yin and the Yang

- "Revenge"

2005

Streetlife - Street Education

- "A Star Is Born"

2006

Inspectah Deck - The Resident Patient

- "Get Ya Weight Up"
- "My Style"

2010

Inspectah Deck - Manifesto

- "Luv Letter"
- "T.R.U.E."
- "We Get Down"
- "9th Chamber Part II"
- "Really Real"

2012

Masta Killa - Selling My Soul

- "R U Listening?"
