= Czarface Meets Metal Face =

Studio album by Czarface and MF Doom
- Released: March 30, 2018
- Genre: Hip-hop
- Length: 43:37
- Label: Get On Down; Silver Age
- Producer: 7L; Jeremy Page; Todd Spadafore

Czarface chronology
First Weapon Drawn (2017)	Czarface Meets Metal Face (2018)	Czarface Meets Ghostface (2019)

MF Doom chronology
The Missing Notebook Rhymes (2017)	Czarface Meets Metal Face (2018)	Super What? (2021)

Singles from Czarface Meets Metal Face
- 1. "Nautical Depth" Released: February 8, 2018; 2. "Bomb Thrown" Released: March 20, 2018

Professional ratings
Aggregate scores
Source	Rating
AnyDecentMusic?	6.6/10
Metacritic	75/100
Review scores
Source	Rating
The 405	6.5/10
AllMusic	3.5/5 stars
The A.V. Club	B−
The Guardian	4/5 stars
HipHopDX	4.3/5
NME	3/5 stars
Pitchfork	6.4/10
RapReviews	8.5/10
Vice (Expert Witness)	(3-star Honorable Mention)

Czarface Meets Metal Face is the first collaborative album by American hip-hop supergroup Czarface and British-American rapper MF Doom. It was released on March 30, 2018 through Get On Down, a Boston-based record label. The album features guest appearances from Vinnie Paz, Open Mike Eagle, Blacastan and Kendra Morris. It was the last release by MF Doom before his death on October 31, 2020.

The two previously collaborated on the song "Ka-Bang!" on Czarface's 2015 album Every Hero Needs a Villain, and 2017's First Weapon Drawn.

== Reception ==
Czarface Meets Metal Face received generally favourable reviews upon its release. At Metacritic, which assigns a normalized rating out of 100 to reviews from mainstream critics, the album has received an average score of 75, based on 9 reviews, indicating "generally favourable reviews".

== Track listing ==
All music is composed by The Czar-Keys (George Andrinopoulos, Jeremy Page & Todd Spadafore).

No.	Title	Length
1.	"Take Your Medicine"	0:52
2.	"Meddle with Metal"	3:26
3.	"Badness of Madness"	2:56
4.	"Close Talker"	0:50
5.	"Forever People"	3:20
6.	"Captain Crunch"	3:57
7.	"Don't Spoil It"	1:39
8.	"Phantoms" (featuring Open Mike Eagle)	4:19
9.	"Bomb Thrown"	4:32
10.	"You Masked for It"	1:22
11.	"Astral Traveling" (featuring Vinnie Paz)	3:50
12.	"Nautical Depth" (featuring Blacastan)	3:31
13.	"Stun Gun"	2:03
14.	"MF Czar"	3:22
15.	"Captain Brunch"	2:29
16.	"Sleeping Dogs"	1:09
Total length:		43:37

== Personnel ==
Credits adapted from the album's liner notes.

Musicians

- Inspectah Deck – vocals, composer (all tracks)
- Esoteric – vocals, composer (all tracks)
- MF Doom – vocals, composer (all tracks)
- Blacastan – rude boy vocals (track 12)
- Godforbid – mask specialist (track 10)
- Yuki Kanesaka – interlude keys
- Josh Mac – vocals (track 5)
- Sam Merrick – drums (track 12)
- Kendra Morris – vocals (tracks 8, 9)
- Open Mike Eagle – featured vocals (track 8)
- Vinnie Paz – featured vocals (track 11)
- Morgan Price – flute (track 3), saxophone (track 15)
- Joe Stratton – vocals (track 5)

Production

- The Czar-Keys (Note: The Czar-Keys consist of 7L, Jeremy Page, and Todd Spadafore.) – production (all tracks)
- Caserta – audio mixing (all tracks)
- 7L – vocal engineering (all tracks)
- Esoteric – vocal engineering (all tracks)
- Jason Bitner – vocal engineering (all tracks)
- Adam J. Brass – vocal engineering (all tracks)

Design

- L'amour Supreme – cover art
- Alfredo Rico-Dimas – layout and design

== Charts ==
Chart (2018)	Peak position
Scottish Albums (OCC)	76
US Billboard 200	134
US Top Album Sales (Billboard)	37
US Digital Albums (Billboard)	18
US Independent Albums (Billboard)	5
US Heatseekers Albums (Billboard)	1
US Indie Store Album Sales (Billboard)	5
