= 1212 (7L & Esoteric album) =

Studio album by 7L & Esoteric
- Released: October 12, 2010
- Genre: Hip-hop
- Length: 42:50
- Label: Fly Casual Records
- Producer: 7L & Esoteric; DC the Midi Alien; Statik Selektah

7L & Esoteric chronology
| A New Dope (2006) | 1212 (2010) | Czarface (2013) |

Professional ratings
Review scores
| Source | Rating |
|---|---|
| 411mania | 7.5/10 |
| HipHopDX | 4/5 |
| The Phoenix | 3.5/4 stars |

1212 is the fifth studio album by American hip-hop duo 7L & Esoteric. It was released on October 12, 2010, via Fly Casual Records. Production was handled by 7L, Esoteric, DC the Midi Allen and Statik Selektah. It features guest appearances from Celph Titled, Heavy Metal Kings, Reef the Lost Cauze, Sadat X, Step Brothers and marks the debut of Czarface.

HipHopDX placed the album on its 'Top 25 Albums of 2010' list.

== Track listing ==
| No. | Title | Writer(s) | Producer(s) | Length |
|---|---|---|---|---|
| 1. | "Retrospects" | Seamus Ryan; George Andrinopoulos | 7L | 3:28 |
| 2. | "Run This" (featuring Celph Titled) | Ryan; Vic Mercer; Andrinopoulos | 7L | 2:04 |
| 3. | "Aneurysm" | Ryan | Esoteric | 2:58 |
| 4. | "12th Chamber" (featuring Inspectah Deck) | Ryan; Jason Hunter; Andrinopoulos | 7L | 2:53 |
| 5. | "The Handle" (featuring Sadat X) | Ryan; Derek Murphy; Andrinopoulos | 7L | 3:25 |
| 6. | "For My Enemies" | Ryan | Esoteric | 3:02 |
| 7. | "Drawbar 1-2" (featuring Evidence and Alchemist) | Ryan; Michael Perretta; Alan Maman; Darryl Christy | Esoteric; DC the Midi Alien | 3:24 |
| 8. | "No Shots" | Ryan; Andrinopoulos | 7L & Esoteric | 3:19 |
| 9. | "Bare Knuckle Boxing" (featuring Ill Bill, Vinnie Paz and Reef the Lost Cauze) | Ryan; William Braunstein; Vincenzo Luviner; Sharif Lacey; Andrinopoulos | 7L | 4:22 |
| 10. | "I Hate Flying" | Ryan; Andrinopoulos | 7L | 3:41 |
| 11. | "The Most Rotten" | Ryan; Patrick Baril | Statik Selektah | 2:29 |
| 12. | "New Rapper" | Ryan | Esoteric | 3:57 |
| 13. | "Zoo" | | 7L & Esoteric | 3:48 |
| Total length: | | | | 42:50 |

== Personnel ==
- Seamus "Esoteric" Ryan – vocals, producer (tracks: 3, 6–8, 12, 13), executive producer
- George "7L" Andrinopoulos – producer (tracks: 1, 2, 4, 5, 8–10, 13), mixing, executive producer
- Vic "Celph Titled" Mercer – additional vocals (track 2)
- Jason "Inspectah Deck" Hunter – additional vocals (track 4)
- Beyonder – additional vocals (tracks: 4, 7)
- Derek "Sadat X" Murphy – additional vocals (track 5)
- Michael "Evidence" Perretta – additional vocals (track 7)
- Alan "The Alchemist" Maman – additional vocals (track 7)
- William "Ill Bill" Braunstein – additional vocals (track 9)
- Vincenzo "Vinnie Paz" Luviner – additional vocals (track 9)
- Sharif "Reef the Lost Cauze" Lacey – additional vocals (track 9)
- El Greco – bass & keys (track 1), mixing
- Darryl "DC the Midi Alien" Christy – producer (track 7)
- Patrick "Statik Selektah" Baril – scratches & producer (track 11)
- Trevor "Karma" Gendron – executive producer, design, layout
