= Czarface Meets Frankie Pulitzer =

Studio album by Czarface and Frankie Pulitzer
- Released: August 28, 2026
- Genre: Hip-hop
- Length: 47:21
- Label: Silver Age
- Producers: 7L; Jeremy Page; Agent X; 13th Ward Social Club; Todd Spadafore

Czarface chronology
Czartificial Intelligence (2023)	Czarface Meets Frankie Pulitzer (2026)

Singles from Czarface Meets Frankie Pulitzer
- 1. "Brothers Grimm" Released: June 25, 2026; 2. "All It Takes is One Bad Day" Released: August 4, 2026

Czarface Meets Frankie Pulitzer is the debut collaborative album by American supergroup Czarface and British actor Tom Hardy under the pseudonym Frankie Pulitzer. It was released on August 28, 2026, via Silver Age. The album features guest appearances from Busta Rhymes, Method Man, El-P, and Kendra Morris.

Tom Hardy has not commented publicly on his performance, and appeared masked up in the "Mad Technology" music video.

Two singles were released from the album: "Brothers Grimm" and "All It Takes is One Bad Day". The album debuted at number 96 on the Billboard 200 album chart.

== Background ==
Underground hip-hop duo 7L & Esoteric and Wu-Tang Clan member Inspectah Deck formed Czarface in 2013, releasing numerous albums throughout the 2010s. Inspired by the comic books aesthetics, the group presents their collaborative albums as crossovers.

Before his acting career, in the late 1990s, Tom Hardy signed a record deal with a hip-hop label. Tracks he recorded were never released. "Because I come from a nice middle-class neighborhood it was a very hard sell. And I wasn’t very good", he said in an interview.

Frankie Pulitzer first appeared on Czarface's EP Good Guys, Bad Guys in 2021, with songs from it appearing in the Hardy-starred movie Venom: Let There Be Carnage. In 2024, Busta Rhymes teased a potential collaboration with the actor. The same year, Czarface released the track "Knull & Void", featuring Frankie Pulitzer and Method Man.

== Critical reception ==
Professional ratings
Review scores
Source	Rating
AllMusic	4/5 stars
Clash	8/10
RapReviews	8/10

Czarface Meets Frankie Pulitzer received positive reviews from music critics. Paul Simpson of AllMusic commended the production, writing that the "hard-knocking beats are a bit spooky and a tinge menacing at times". He thought Frankie Pulitzer brought back action and fantasy elements to Czarface's music, while the group explored personal and nostalgic themes. Clash's Tom Morgan called it one of Czarface's best albums and described it as a "vibrant and hard-boiled collection". He praised Frankie Pulitzer's vocal performance, adding that "his word association and internal rhymes are actually excellent". Summarizing his review, Sy Shackleford of RapReviews wrote: "As per usual, this was a typical Czarface affair: battle rhymes with intricate wordplay wrapped up in a comic book aesthetic". He also highlighted Frankie Pulitzer's performance, saying that it was on par with other artists on the album.

== Track listing ==
All lyrics are written by Jason Hunter, Seamus Ryan and Frankie Pulitzer.

No.	Title	Producer(s)	Length
1.	"Brothers Grimm"	7L; Agent X	3:08
2.	"All It Takes is One Bad Day"	7L	2:32
3.	"That's Law"	7L; Jeremy Page	3:10
4.	"Raw Forever" (featuring Busta Rhymes)	7L; Todd Spadafore	4:01
5.	"Triple Helix"	7L	3:01
6.	"Grim-Visaged War"	7L; 13th Ward Social Club	3:17
7.	"Dr. Yorgo in the Land of Acid 7.0"	7L; Jeremy Page	3:45
8.	"Mad Technology" (featuring Method Man)	7L; Jeremy Page	3:43
9.	"Gnawing at My Rhyme Like a Poisonous Rat"	7L; Agent X	3:00
10.	"Omega Beam"	7L; Jeremy Page; 13th Ward Social Club	3:09
11.	"Dragon Cannon" (featuring El-P)	7L; Agent X	3:51
12.	"Scrub"	7L; Jeremy Page	1:26
13.	"Paul Bufano Type Beat"	7L; Agent X	3:57
14.	"Frankie" (featuring Kendra Morris)	7L; Jeremy Page	2:07
15.	"Intruder...Seems Curious"	7L; Jeremy Page	3:06

== Charts ==
Chart (2026)	Peak position
Australian Albums (ARIA)	60
Belgian Albums (Ultratop Flanders)	129
Dutch Albums (Album Top 100)	100
German Albums (Offizielle Top 100)	34
New Zealand Albums (RMNZ)	36
Scottish Albums (Official Charts)	19
Swiss Albums (Schweizer Hitparade)	69
UK Albums (Official Charts)	55
UK Independent Albums (Official Charts)	7
UK R&B Albums (Official Charts)	2
US Billboard 200	96
