= First Weapon Drawn =

Studio album by Czarface
- Released: April 22, 2017
- Genre: Boom bap
- Length: 33:56
- Label: Silver Age
- Producer: Esoteric (exec.); Inspectah Deck (exec.); 7L (also exec.); Todd Spadafore; Jeremy Page

Czarface chronology
A Fistful of Peril (2016)	First Weapon Drawn (2017)	Czarface Meets Metal Face (2018)

Professional ratings
Review scores
Source	Rating
HipHopDX	3.5/5 stars

First Weapon Drawn is the fourth studio album by American hip-hop trio Czarface, which consists of rapper and Wu-Tang Clan member Inspectah Deck and underground hip-hop duo 7L & Esoteric. It was released on April 22, 2017 via Silver Age. The album peaked at number 44 on the Independent Albums and number 16 on the Heatseekers Albums in the United States.

== Track listing ==
No.	Title	Length
1.	"Czarface Theme"	2:18
2.	"First Weapon Drawn"	1:55
3.	"Czartusi"	2:12
4.	"For the Title"	2:22
5.	"Kick it up a Notch"	3:12
6.	"A Falling Czar"	3:05
7.	"Funky Premonition"	1:24
8.	"Squared Portal"	3:27
9.	"This Fight Ain't Scripted"	3:10
10.	"Godspeed Soldier"	2:08
11.	"Something Once Human"	1:51
12.	"What the Problem Is"	2:01
13.	"Death of a Comrad"	1:42
14.	"Night Of/Mourning After"	3:09

== Personnel ==
- Seamus Ryan – executive producer, additional vocals
- Jason Richard Hunter – executive producer
- George Andrinopoulos – executive producer
- Todd Spadafore – producer
- Jeremy Page – producer, instruments
- Yukihiro Kanesaka – instruments
- Kendra Morris – additional vocals (track 1)
- Kelly Hammer – additional vocals
- Troy Hudson – additional vocals
- Sam Merrick – drums (track 4)
- Zack Martin – drums (track 6)
- Andy Bauer – drums (track 10)
- Wes Garland – mastering
- Jason Bitner – mastering
- Alfredo Rico-Dimas – design and layout
- Gilberto Aguirre Mata – artwork
- L'Amour Supreme – cover art

== Charts ==
Chart (2017)	Peak position
US Independent Albums (Billboard)	44
US Heatseekers Albums (Billboard)	16
