= Made in Brooklyn =

Studio album by Masta Killa
- Released: August 8, 2006
- Recorded: 2004–2006
- Genre: East Coast hip-hop
- Length: 51:16
- Label: Nature Sounds
- Producers: Chris Conway; Mark Grant; MF Doom; Dev 1; P.F. Cuttin; Bronze Nazareth; Whyz Ruler; Jig Sor; Pete Rock; Startel; Governor Tools

Masta Killa chronology
No Said Date (2004)	Made in Brooklyn (2006)	Selling My Soul (2012)

Wu-Tang Clan solo chronology
The Resident Patient (2006)	Made in Brooklyn (2006)	4:21... The Day After (2006)

Singles from Made in Brooklyn
- 1. "Ringing Bells" Released: April 3, 2006; 2. "It's What It Is" Released: July 10, 2006; 3. "Iron God Chamber" Released: January 23, 2007

Made in Brooklyn is the second solo studio album by Wu-Tang Clan member Masta Killa. The album was released on August 8, 2006, by Nature Sounds. Recording sessions took place during 2004 to 2006. Production was handled by Pete Rock, Bronze Nazareth, Whyz Ruler and MF Doom, as well as guest appearances from all the other seven surviving Wu-Tang Clan members. Upon its release, Made in Brooklyn has received generally favorable reviews from music critics. The album peaked at number 176 on the US Billboard 200.

== Background ==
In regard to the album's title he stated:

It's basically the same formula as No Said Date, but with more of a Brooklyn swagger. It's a piece of me, where I come from and a dedication to the MCs, producers and the people from the neighborhood.

Unlike his previous album, there is no production input from the RZA, although it has several tracks from Bronze Nazareth. In regards to this decision, he stated:

I know how the Wu-Tang sound is supposed to be. I can get sound I’m looking for. Go back to neighborhood and work with people I’ve wanted to for a long time. When you hear the music you will think one of those original brothers did the beats, but it’s not. 75% of this album was recorded in Brooklyn. But I’m not looking to taking nothing over. I’m not the king of shit. It’s just what I’m doing now. There’s not a whole bunch of beefing and quarrelling. That’s just a whole bunch of bullshit that doesn’t really have anything to do with music.

== Singles ==
The album's first single, "Ringing Bells", was originally released on the Nature Sounds Records Natural Selection compilation. The second single from the album is "It's What It Is" featuring Raekwon and Ghostface Killah, with "Brooklyn King" as its B-Side.

== Critical reception ==
Professional ratings
Aggregate scores
Source	Rating
Metacritic	66/100
Review scores
Source	Rating
Okayplayer	(83/100)
Pitchfork	(7.2/10)
RapReviews.com	(8.0/10)

Made in Brooklyn has received generally favorable reviews from critics. Okayplayer gave the album a score of 83 out of 100. Ryan Dombal of Pitchfork gave the album a 7.2 out of 10 rating. RapReviews.com's Steve Juon gave the album an 8 out of 10.

== Track listing ==
Made in Brooklyn track listing
No.	Title	Writer(s)	Producer(s)	Length
1.	"Then & Now" (featuring Kareem Justice, Shamel Irief & Young Prince)	Jamel Irief	Chris Conway; Mark Grant	3:32
2.	"E.N.Y. House"	Irief; Daniel Dumile	MF Doom	2:36
3.	"Brooklyn King"	Irief	Dev 1	2:39
4.	"It's What It Is" (featuring Raekwon & Ghostface Killah)	Irief; Corey Woods; Dennis David Coles	P.F. Cuttin	3:23
5.	"Nehanda & Cream"	Irief	Bronze Nazareth	4:11
6.	"Iron God Chamber" (featuring U-God, RZA & Method Man)	Irief; Lamont Jody Hawkins; Robert Fitzgerald Diggs; Clifford Smith, Jr.	Whyz Ruler	3:50
7.	"Pass the Bone (Remix)" (featuring Startel)	Irief; Gary Eldridge Grice; Diggs; Startel	Jig Sor	4:04
8.	"Older Gods Part 2"	Irief; Popa Wu	Pete Rock	5:24
9.	"Let's Get Into Something" (featuring Startel)	Irief	Startel	4:00
10.	"Street Corner" (featuring Inspectah Deck & GZA)	Irief; Jason Richard Hunter; Grice	Bronze Nazareth	4:13
11.	"Ringing Bells"	Irief	Bronze Nazareth	3:13
12.	"East MC's" (featuring Killa Sin, Free Murder, Victorious & K. Born)	Irief; Jeryl Grant; Timothy Drayton	Dev 1	5:00
13.	"Lovely Lady" (featuring Ski & Governor Tools)	Irief	Governor Tools	5:12
Total length:				51:16

== Personnel ==
Credits for Made in Brooklyn adapted from AllMusic.

- Ghostface Killah – Composer
- GZA – Composer
- Devin Horwitz – Executive Producer
- Jamel Irief – Audio Production
- Killa Sin – Composer
- Masta Killa – Composer
- Method Man – Composer
- Raekwon – Composer
- RZA – Composer
- Michael Sarsfield – Mastering
- Frenchie Sartell – Composer
- U-God – Composer
- The Victorious Gospel Jubilees – Composer
- Wu-Tang Clan – Composer
- Young Prince – Composer

== Charts ==
Chart (2006)	Peak position
US Billboard 200	176
US Top R&B/Hip-Hop Albums (Billboard)	45
