= Dragon's Breath (album) =

Studio album by Inspectah Deck
- Released: August 7, 2026
- Genre: Hip-hop
- Length: 67:03
- Labels: Urban Icon; DNA Music Group
- Producers: 7L; Cashmere Brown; King Yohannes; PA. Dre

Inspectah Deck chronology
Chamber No. 9 (2019)	Dragon's Breath (2026)

Professional ratings
Review scores
Source	Rating
Underground Hip hop Blog	7/10

Dragon's Breath is the sixth studio album by American rapper and Wu-Tang Clan member Inspectah Deck. It was released on August 7, 2026, through Urban Icon Records and DNA Music Group. It features guest appearances by other Czarface members, Blue Raspberry, Cappadonna, Che Noir, Kxng Crooked, Mickey Factz, Peedi Crakk, Raekwon, Sa-Roc, Sauce Money and Skyzoo. Production was mainly handled by PA. Dre, with other contributions from 7L, Cashmere Brown and King Yohannes.

== Background ==
On July 24, 2026, Inspectah Deck released the lead single entitled "Day in the Life", which features Baegod, accompanied by an official music video directed by Rock Davis, and simultaneously announced the release of the album, scheduled for release on August 7, 2026. The track, produced by P.A. Dre, showcases Deck's characteristic sharp lyricism and storytelling over a soulful beat. In the same announcement, Deck also revealed an upcoming Czarface project, Czarface Meets Frankie Pulitzer, set for August 28, 2026.

On July 31, 2026, he released the second single entitled "Shaolin Rebel 2", which features Siahlaw, along with its accompanying video. The song serves as a sequel to a track from his previous solo album Chamber No. 9 (2019) and further previewed the boom-bap-oriented sound of the forthcoming project.

== Track listing ==
Dragon's Breath track listing
No.	Title	Writer(s)	Producer(s)	Length
1.	"Dragon's Intro" (featuring M.O.W.E.)	Jason Hunter	PA. Dre	1:00
2.	"Never Fold" (featuring Raekwon, Sauce Money, Skyzoo and D.V. alias Khryst)	J. Hunter; Corey Woods; Todd Eric Gaither; Gregory Skyler Taylor; Kenneth Scranton	PA. Dre	4:03
3.	"H.E.C.T.O.R."	J. Hunter	PA. Dre	3:47
4.	"Lighter Fluid" (featuring ETO, Mickey Factz and RJ Payne)	J. Hunter; Alvin Olavarria; Mark Anthony Williams Jr.; Robert Evans	PA. Dre	3:05
5.	"Shaolin Rebel 2" (featuring Siahlaw)	J. Hunter; James Stringer	King Yohannes	2:59
6.	"The System" (featuring L. Biz)	J. Hunter	PA. Dre	4:08
7.	"Up At Night" (featuring Peedi Crakk and M.O.W.E.)	J. Hunter; Pedro Louis Zayas	PA. Dre	3:48
8.	"Day in the Life" (featuring Baegod)	J. Hunter; Maryann Hunter	PA. Dre	3:48
9.	"One of One" (featuring G4 Jag, M.A.V., Kxng Crooked and Carrying the Culture 2.0)	J. Hunter; John Ahmed Guilford; Dominick Antron Wickliffe	PA. Dre	4:15
10.	"Flight School" (featuring Chedda Bang)	J. Hunter	Cashmere Brown	3:01
11.	"Burgundy" (featuring L. Biz)	J. Hunter	PA. Dre	3:43
12.	"Cold Case" (featuring Ransom and Gripz)	J. Hunter; Randy Nichols	PA. Dre	3:46
13.	"Divine Protection" (featuring Sa-Roc, Che Noir & Redddaz)	J. Hunter; Assata Perkins; Marche Lashawn	PA. Dre	4:16
14.	"Solitude" (featuring Flee Lord, Hus KingPin & BVNGS)	J. Hunter; David Paul Cordova; Cory Atkins; LaQuisha Powell	PA. Dre	4:34
15.	"Anointed" (featuring 7xvethegenius, 40 B.A.R.R.S. and Bahamadia)	J. Hunter; Felicia Perry; Carlisa Lee; Antonia Reed	PA. Dre	3:46
16.	"Possession" (featuring Cappadonna, Hellfire, Blue Raspberry and Son of Tony)	J. Hunter; Darryl Hill	PA. Dre	4:11
17.	"Funny Style" (featuring CEE Brown)	J. Hunter	PA. Dre	3:06
18.	"Czariana Grande" (with Czarface)	J. Hunter; George Andrinopoulos; Seamus Ryan	PA. Dre; 7L	2:54
19.	"Explicit Material" (with Czarface)	J. Hunter; Andrinopoulos; Ryan	PA. Dre; 7L	2:53
Total length:				67:03
