= Czarmageddon! =

Studio album by Czarface
- Released: April 29, 2022
- Genre: Hip-hop
- Length: 31:40
- Label: Silver Age
- Producer: The Czar-Keys

Czarface chronology
Czar Noir (2021)	Czarmageddon! (2022)	Czartificial Intelligence (2023)

Professional ratings
Review scores
Source	Rating
AllMusic	4/5 stars
Tom Hull	B+

Czarmageddon! is the eleventh studio album by American hip-hop trio Czarface. It was released on April 29, 2022 via Silver Age. Produced by the Czar-Keys, it features guest appearances from Frankie Pulitzer, Kool Keith, Lion Eye and Kendra Morris.

In the United States, the album debuted at number 178 on the Billboard 200, number 26 on the Independent Albums and topped the Heatseekers Albums charts. In the UK, it reached number 8 on the Official Hip Hop and R&B Albums Chart and number 11 on the Official Independent Album Breakers Chart.

== Track listing ==
No.	Title	Length
1.	"Damien's Dinner Time"	2:23
2.	"The Czarlaac Pit" (featuring Frankie Pulitzer)	2:37
3.	"Can It Be?"	2:18
4.	"Walk Thru Walls"	3:29
5.	"Splash Page"	1:58
6.	"Bob LaCzar"	2:54
7.	"Big Em Up" (featuring Lion Eye)	3:13
8.	"Nu Mutantes"	2:20
9.	"Fearless & Inventive" (featuring Kool Keith)	2:29
10.	"Boogie Defmix"	2:17
11.	"Czarv Wolfman"	3:05
12.	"Logan-5"	2:37
Total length:		31:40

Sample credits

- Track 2 contains a sample from "Lotus" by Sven Wunder.

== Personnel ==
- Seamus "Esoteric" Ryan – vocals
- Jason "Inspectah Deck" Hunter – vocals
- Tom "Frankie Pulitzer" Hardy – vocals (track 2)
- Kendra Morris – additional vocals (track 3)
- Lion Eye – vocals (track 7)
- "Kool Keith" Thornton – vocals (track 9)
- George "7L" Andrinopoulos – producer
- Jeremy Page – producer
- Jason Bitner – mastering
- Lamour Supreme – artwork
- Alfredo Rico-Dimas – design
- Joel Stone – reaction figure photography
- Olivia Walsh – reaction figure photography editing

== Charts ==
Chart (2022)	Peak position
UK R&B Albums (Official Charts)	8
UK Independent Album Breakers Chart (OCC)	11
US Billboard 200	178
US Independent Albums (Billboard)	26
US Heatseekers Albums (Billboard)	1
