= Super What? =

Studio album by Czarface and MF Doom
- Released: May 7, 2021
- Recorded: April 2020
- Genre: Hip-hop; boom bap
- Length: 26:44
- Label: Silver Age
- Producer: The Czar-Keys

Czarface chronology
| The Odd Czar Against Us (2019) | Super What? (2021) | Czar Noir (2021) |

MF Doom chronology
| Czarface Meets Metal Face (2018) | Super What? (2021) | Madvillainy 2 (TBA) |

Super What? is the second collaborative album by American hip-hop supergroup Czarface and British-American rapper MF Doom. It was released on May 7, 2021. The album is a follow-up to their 2018 collaborative project Czarface Meets Metal Face, and is Doom's first posthumous release. The album contains features from Run-DMC's DMC, Del the Funky Homosapien, Kendra Morris, and That Handsome Devil's Godforbid.

== Background and release ==
Apart from the album marking the trio's second collaborative LP with Doom, they also worked together on Czarface's 2015 track, "Ka-Bang!", off Every Hero Needs a Villain. Super What? was recorded in April 2020, and was originally slated for release that same month, but was delayed due to the COVID-19 pandemic. Czarface member Esoteric explained:

When COVID-19 struck and the world stopped, we chose to pull it, focus on family, and fine-tune a few elements on it. What you'll be hearing was finalized, mixed & mastered in the summer of 2020, and it's our honor and privilege to share it with you. I speak for everyone involved when I say we were incredibly fortunate to have collaborated with DOOM…he was a one-of-a-kind, never-to-be-duplicated emcee, producer, and visionary. We wish peace and healing to his family, friends and everyone touched by the gifts he shared with the planet. MF DOOM FOREVER.

The album consists of two halves, the "Doom Side" and the "Czar Side". It is accompanied by a comic book written by Esoteric and illustrated by Benjamin Marra.

The cover art by L'Amour Supreme is based on the cover of issue 216 of the 1964 Marvel Comics series Daredevil.

Professional ratings
Aggregate scores
| Source | Rating |
|---|---|
| Metacritic | 74/100 |
Review scores
| Source | Rating |
| AllMusic | 3.5/5 stars |
| Exclaim! | 8/10 |
| NME | 3/5 stars |
| RapReviews | 7/10 |
| Resident Advisor | 4/5 stars |
| Sputnikmusic | 4.1/5 |
| Tom Hull – on the Web | A− |

== Track listing ==
DOOM side
| No. | Title | Length |
|---|---|---|
| 1. | "The King and Eye" (featuring DMC of Run-DMC) | 2:26 |
| 2. | "Czarwyn's Theory of People Getting Loose" (featuring Kendra Morris) | 3:16 |
| 3. | "Mando Calrissian" | 2:17 |
| 4. | "DOOM Unto Others" | 2:44 |

Czar side
| No. | Title | Length |
|---|---|---|
| 1. | "Jason & the Czargonauts" (featuring Del the Funky Homosapien) | 3:50 |
| 2. | "Break in the Action" | 2:29 |
| 3. | "A Name to the Face" | 1:45 |
| 4. | "This Is Canon Now" | 2:11 |
| 5. | "So Strange" (featuring Godforbid of THD) | 2:34 |
| 6. | "Young World" | 3:12 |
| Total length: | | 26:44 |

== Charts ==
Chart performance for Super What?
| Chart (2021) | Peak position |
|---|---|
| Scottish Albums (OCC) | 71 |
| UK R&B Albums (OCC) | 6 |
