= Chamber No. 9 =

2019 album by Inspectah Deck

Studio album by Inspectah Deck
- Released: July 12, 2019
- Genre: Hip-hop
- Length: 40:27
- Label: Urban Icon
- Producers: Boo Buddy; Danny Caiazzo

Inspectah Deck chronology
Manifesto (2010)	Chamber No. 9 (2019)	Dragon's Breath (2026)

Wu-Tang Clan solo chronology
Meth Lab Season 2: The Lithium (2018)	Chamber No. 9 (2019)	Ghostface Killahs (2019)

Professional ratings
Review scores
Source	Rating
RapReviews	7.5/10
Underground Hip Hop	6/10

Chamber No. 9 is the fifth studio album by American rapper and Wu-Tang Clan member Inspectah Deck. It was released on July 12, 2019, through Urban Icon Records. It features guest appearances by Cappadonna, Streetlife, Trife Diesel, Hellfire and Mz. Geminii. Production was handled by Boo Bundy and Danny Caiazzo.

== Background ==
On May 16, 2019, Inspectah Deck announced he was working on a new album.

On July 12, 2019, he released his first studio album since March 2010, entitled Chamber No. 9. The same day, he released the first single of the album entitled "Game Don’t Change".

== Track listing ==
Credits adapted from Tidal.

Chamber No. 9 track listing
No.	Title	Writer(s)	Producer(s)	Length
1.	"Shaolin Rebel"	Jason Richard Hunter; Danny Caiazzo	Danny Caiazzo	2:43
2.	"No Good"	Hunter	Danny Caiazzo	2:56
3.	"Russell Jones"	Hunter	Danny Caiazzo	3:29
4.	"Can't Stay Away"	Hunter	Danny Caiazzo	3:30
5.	"Na Na Na"	Hunter	Danny Caiazzo	3:28
6.	"Chamber No. 9"	Hunter	Danny Caiazzo	2:32
7.	"Certified"	Hunter	Danny Caiazzo	2:27
8.	"24K" (featuring Cappadonna and Hellfire)	Hunter; Darryl Hill; Adam Cahani	Boo Bundy	3:11
9.	"What It Be Like"	Hunter	Boo Bundy	3:24
10.	"Game Don't Change"	Hunter	Boo Bundy	3:00
11.	"Dolla Signs" (featuring Mz. Geminii)	Hunter	Danny Caiazzo	3:08
12.	"Who Run It" (featuring Hellfire and Streetlife)	Hunter; Cahani; Patrick Charles	Danny Caiazzo	4:00
13.	"Fire" (featuring Trife Diesel)	Hunter; Theo Bailey	Danny Caiazzo	2:39
Total length:				40:27

== Personnel ==
- Inspectah Deck – primary artist
- Cappadonna – featured artist
- Streetlife – featured artist
- Trife Diesel – featured artist
- Hellfire – featured artist
- Mz. Geminii – featured artist
- Boo Buddy – producer
- Danny Caiazzo – producer
- Josh Gannet – mixing
