= Kendra Morris =

American singer

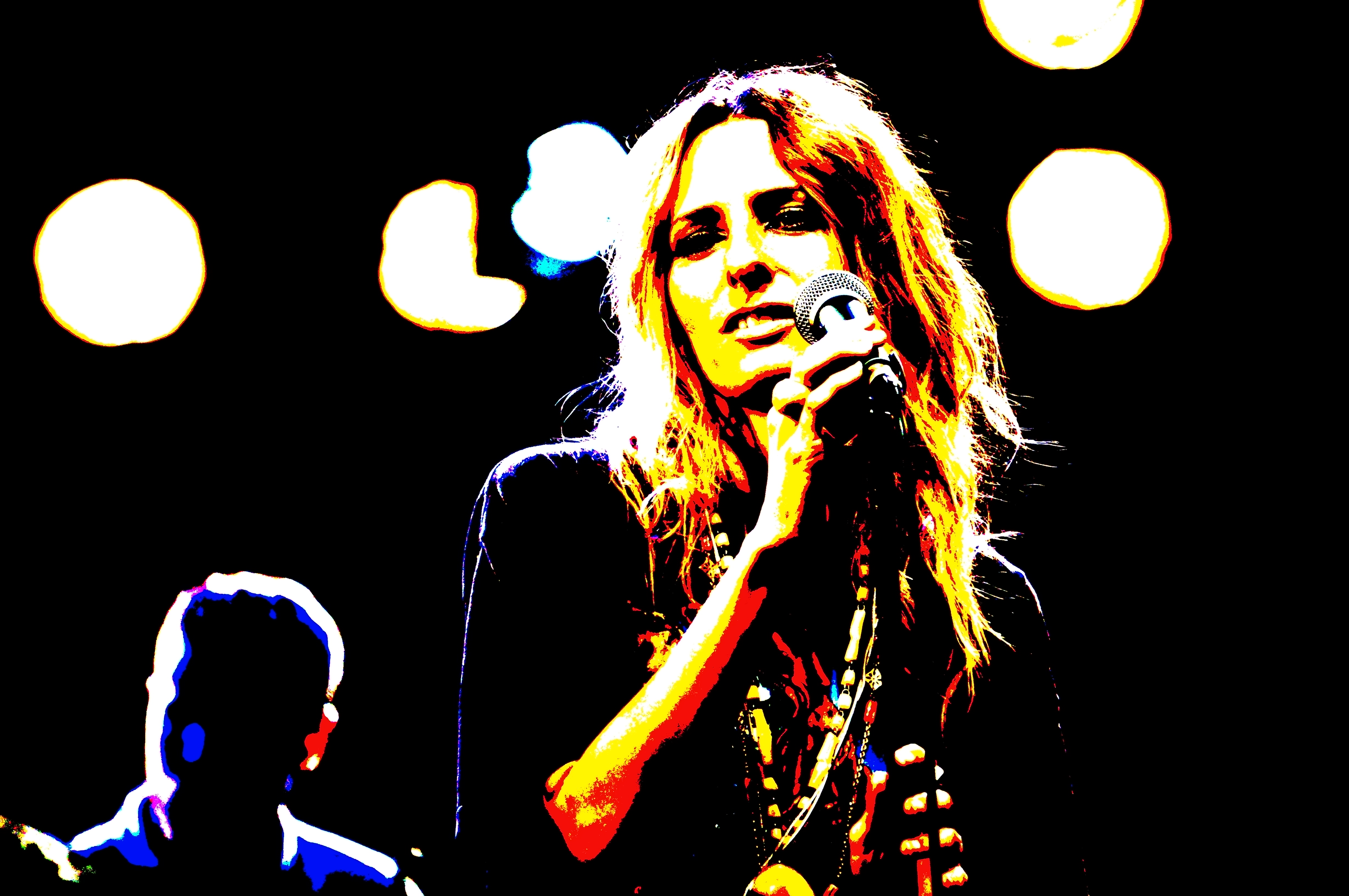

Background information
- Born: Kendra Morris; April 10, 1981 (age 45); Lodi, California, United States
- Genre: Soul
- Occupations: Singer, musician, visual artist
- Instruments: Vocals, guitar
- Years active: 2008–present
- Label: Wax Poetics 2011–2013, Naive 2011–2013, ..
- Website: kendramorrismusic.com

Kendra Morris (born April 10, 1981) is an American soul singer-songwriter based in New York City, originally from St. Petersburg, Florida.

== Career ==
Morris was a contestant on Fuse TV's Redemption Song. She was signed to Wax Poetics, and in 2011 released her first single, "Concrete Waves" (which later received a remix from DJ Premier). Also in 2011, she joined Dennis Coffey on tour, performing lead vocals. Her debut album, Banshee, was released in August 2012 from Naïve Records. Her sophomore release Mockingbird, a covers record was released on Wax Poetics on July 30, 2013.

In 2013, her cover of Pink Floyd's "Shine On You Crazy Diamond" was featured in early trailers for the film Dead Man Down. The use of the song was well received, with Movieline calling it "kind of amazing", ScreenCrush saying it "lends the movie an eerie and beautiful grandeur", and BuzzSugar said the "powerful" song was what made the trailer "pop".

Her song "Banshee" was featured in the season one episode of Ray Donovan "Fite Nite".

On June 17, 2016, Morris released her third album, titled Babble.

Morris was featured on the single "Phantoms" with Open Mike Eagle and Vinnie Paz on the Czarface-MF Doom collaboration album Czarface Meets Metal Face, and directed and animated the official video for the single "Bomb Thrown". She again collaborated with Czarface when she was featured on two tracks ("Morning Ritual" and "The King Heard Voices") on their collaboration album with Ghostface Killah, Czarface Meets Ghostface, and later on the song "Czarwyn's Theory of People Getting Loose" on their second collaboration album with MF Doom, Super What?

Morris released her fourth album, titled Nine Lives on February 18, 2022. "Penny Pincher" was released as its lead single.

A new album titled I Am What I'm Waiting For was announced for release on August 25, 2023.

== Discography ==
=== Albums ===
Year	Album	Peak positions
Year	Album	FR
2010	Kendra Morris	-
2012	Banshee	104
2013	Mockingbird	-
2016	Babble	-
2022	Nine Lives	-
2023	I Am What I'm Waiting For	-
2025	Next	-

=== Singles ===
Year	Single	Peak positions	Album
Year	Single	FR	Album
2011	"Concrete Waves"	–	
2014	"Banshee"	151	Banshee
2022	"Penny Pincher"	–	Nine Lives
