= The Resident Patient =

Studio album by Inspectah Deck
- Released: July 25, 2006
- Genres: Hip hop; East Coast hip hop
- Length: 49:14
- Label: Urban Icon
- Producers: Inspectah Deck; Concrete Beats; Mondee; Cilvaringz; Flowerz Productions; The Marksmen; Liveson; Psycho Les

Inspectah Deck chronology
The Movement (2003)	The Resident Patient (2006)	The Manifesto (2010)

Wu-Tang Clan solo chronology
Fishscale (2006)	The Resident Patient (2006)	Made in Brooklyn (2006)

Professional ratings
Review scores
Source	Rating
Allmusic	3.5/5 stars

The Resident Patient is the third studio album by American rapper and Wu-Tang Clan member Inspectah Deck. Originally put out as a mixtape, its status as an official release is somewhat contested, and it is now generally considered a "street album"—an informal album released somewhat under the radar. It was also meant to be a prelude to his album The Rebellion; however, since its release, Deck has announced that The Resident Patient 2 will be coming ahead of The Rebellion, which will be his final album.

== Background ==
The Resident Patient features production from largely underground artists Flowers Productions, Live Son, The Marksmen, Concrete Beats and Yak Ballz producer Mondee, as well as The Beatnuts member Psycho Les, Wu-Tang affiliate Cilvaringz, and Deck himself. Guesting are Masta Killa and U-God of the core Wu-Tang Clan, as well as Deck's loosely defined Housegang crew; here, they consist of La Banga, Carlton Fisk, Hugh Hef, and Donnie Cash. The record's sound is underground, with a more New York bent than traditional Wu-Tang releases, though some tracks—especially "A Lil' Story"—are heavily reminiscent of RZA's signature sound. It was thought that RZA had produced the track because of its sound and Deck's shoutout to the producer at the beginning of the song, but Deck has confirmed it was in fact Cilvaringz, stating,

A lot of people thought it was produced by RZA, but Cilvaringz is a RZA student, so it's all good to me."

The Resident Patient's release comes only three years after Inspectah Deck's previous album, The Movement, marking the shortest time period between two of the Wu rapper's solo releases; like his previous albums, it forgoes any effort at popular success and aims for a strictly underground, street feel. Unlike his two other releases, however, its sound is more cinematic, relying on strings or horns low in the mix and synthesizers, organs or piano chords for emphasis. The subject matter also differs, shifting from enlightening street narratives to gritty boasts and scattered movie or pop culture references, including "A Lil' Story" (made up of movie titles and actors' names) and even the album's title, taking the name of a Sherlock Holmes detective story (a reference in itself, to Deck being an "Inspectah").

== Track listing ==
The Resident Patient track listing
No.	Title	Writer(s)	Producer(s)	Length
1.	"Sound of the Slums" (featuring Masta Killa)	Jason Richard Hunter; Jamel Irief	Concrete Beats	2:05
2.	"C.R.E.E.P.S."	Hunter	Mondee	2:54
3.	"What They Want"	Hunter	Mondee	2:25
4.	"Get Ya Weight Up"	Hunter	Inspectah Deck	3:15
5.	"Interlude I"	Hunter		0:08
6.	"It's Not a Game" (featuring House Gang and Suga Bang Bang)	Hunter	Mondee	3:30
7.	"Interlude II"	Hunter		0:12
8.	"My Style"	Hunter	Inspectah Deck	2:17
9.	"All I Want Is Mine"	Hunter	Mondee	3:38
10.	"A Lil Story"	Hunter	Cilvaringz	3:08
11.	"Get Down Wit Me"	Hunter	Cilvaringz	2:39
12.	"I.O.U."	Hunter	Flowers Prod.	2:26
13.	"No Love" (featuring Carlton Fisk and Chico Debango)	Hunter	The Marksmen	4:24
14.	"Grits" (Freestyle)	Hunter	Live Son	1:35
15.	"Do My Thang"	Hunter	Psycho Les	2:48
16.	"Handle That" (featuring U-God and Hugh Hef)	Hunter; Lamont Jody Hawkins	Mondee	3:29
17.	"Animal Rights" (featuring House Gang)	Hunter; George Cooney; Donald Whittemore	The Marksmen	4:07
18.	"H.G. Is My Life" (featuring House Gang)	Hunter	Live Son	4:14
Total length:				49:14
