= Czar Noir =

Studio album by Czarface
- Released: July 17, 2021
- Genre: Boom bap
- Length: 21:50
- Label: Silver Age
- Producer: Esoteric (exec.); Inspectah Deck (exec.); 7L (also exec.)

Czarface chronology
Super What? (2021)	Czar Noir (2021)	Czarmageddon! (2022)

Czar Noir is the tenth overall and seventh studio album by American hip-hop trio Czarface, which consists of rapper and Wu-Tang Clan member Inspectah Deck and underground hip-hop duo 7L & Esoteric. It was released on July 17, 2021, via Silver Age to promote the annual event Record Store Day.

== Track listing ==
No.	Title	Length
1.	"Czarface Theme 3099"	1:49
2.	"Winged Fingers"	2:01
3.	"Voyage Dans Le Temps"	1:37
4.	"She Could Use Another Friend"	1:53
5.	"Rise of Czar Noir"	1:11
6.	"Quick Thinking"	1:36
7.	"Mass Transit"	1:23
8.	"Avant-Czar"	1:39
9.	"Czarbot 1 Theme"	1:28
10.	"Gas Trick"	0:53
11.	"Pedestrians Run"	1:09
12.	"Fights Are Like That"	1:49
13.	"Dzzzt!"	1:30
14.	"Next Time on Czar Noir"	1:46
Total length:		21:50

== Personnel ==
- Artwork [Color Assist By] – Jason Fischer Kouhi
- Artwork [Drawn By] – Benjamin Marra
- Cover [Cover Art By] – L'Amour Supreme*
- Design, Layout – Alfredo Rico-Dimas
- Illustration [Czarbear] – Terry Gordon
- Illustration [Czarcookie] – Sean Macabre
- Illustration [Czarface] – Jonny Gillard
- Illustration [Czarth Maul] – Brandon Bracamonte
- Illustration [Dimension X Czar] – LURK
- Illustration [Dino-Czar] – Stephen Lindsay
- Illustration [King Of Czar Spades] – Craig Deuce
- Illustration [Untitled] – John Coen
- Liner Notes – Esoteric, Seamus Ryan
- Producer, Arranged By – The Czar-Keys
- Written-By [Comic Story] – Esoteric, Seamus
