= Czartificial Intelligence =

Studio album by Czarface
- Released: December 1, 2023
- Genre: Hip-hop
- Length: 40:08
- Label: Silver Age
- Producer: The Czar-Keys

Czarface chronology
Czarmageddon! (2022)	Czartificial Intelligence (2023)	Czarface Meets Frankie Pulitzer (2026)

Professional ratings
Review scores
Source	Rating
AllMusic	4/5 stars
Pitchfork	6.5/10
Spectrum Culture	4/5 stars
Tom Hull	A−

Czartificial Intelligence is the twelfth studio album by American hip-hop group Czarface. It was released on December 1, 2023, via Silver Age/Virgin Music. Produced by the Czar-Keys, it features guest appearances from Kool Keith, Frankie Pulitzer, Godfather Don, Logic and Nems.

The album peaked at number 7 on the Heatseekers Albums in the United States, and also reached number 9 on the Official Hip Hop and R&B Albums Chart and number 22 on the Record Store Chart in the UK.

== Track listing ==
All tracks are written by Seamus Ryan and Jason Hunter.

Czartificial Intelligence track listing
No.	Title	Producer(s)	Length
1.	"Czarchimedes' Death Ray"	7L; JL Hodges	2:52
2.	"Blast Off"	7L; Jeremy Page	2:28
3.	"All That for a Drop of Blood"	7L; JL Hodges	2:53
4.	"You Know My Style" (featuring Nems)	7L; JL Hodges	3:41
5.	"Mama's Basement"	7L; Jeremy Page	2:57
6.	"Frenzy in a Far Off World" (featuring Frankie Pulitzer)	7L; Jeremy Page	2:40
7.	"Czarsenic"	7L; JL Hodges	1:33
8.	"Gatecrasher" (featuring Logic)	7L; Jeremy Page	2:57
9.	"Sirens"	7L; Jeremy Page	2:14
10.	"Helicopter" (featuring Godfather Don and Kool Keith)	7L; Todd Spadafore	3:41
11.	"One Eleven Chelsea"	7L; Jeremy Page	2:17
12.	"Marvel at That (Road Trip)"	Jeremy Page	3:12
13.	"Live From Czarnegie Hall" (featuring Kool Keith)	7L; Jeremy Page	2:36
14.	"Together"	7L; Jeremy Page	4:11
Total length:			40:08

== Personnel ==
- Seamus "Esoteric" Ryan – vocals
- Jason "Inspectah Deck" Hunter – vocals
- Travis "Nems" Doyle – vocals (track 4)
- Tom "Frankie Pulitzer" Hardy – vocals (track 6)
- Sir Robert Bryson "Logic" Hall II – vocals (track 8)
- "Kool Keith" Thornton – vocals (tracks: 10, 13)
- Rodney "Godfather Don" Chapman – vocals (track 10)
- George "7L" Andrinopoulos – producer (tracks: 1–11, 13, 14)
- JL Hodges – producer (tracks: 1, 3, 4, 7)
- Jeremy Page – producer (tracks: 2, 5, 6, 8, 9, 11–14), mixing
- Todd Spadafore – producer (track 10)
- Jason Bitner – executive audio assistance
- Lamour Supreme – cover, artwork
- Dan McCormack – layout

== Charts ==
Chart performance for Czartificial Intelligence
Chart (2023)	Peak position
UK R&B Albums (Official Charts)	9
UK Record Store Chart (OCC)	22
US Heatseekers Albums (Billboard)	7
