= A Fistful of Peril =

Studio album by Czarface
- Released: October 25, 2016
- Genre: Hip-hop
- Length: 36:21
- Label: Silver Age
- Producers: Esoteric (exec.); Inspectah Deck (exec.); 7L (also exec.); Todd Spadafore

Czarface chronology
Every Hero Needs a Villain (2015)	A Fistful of Peril (2016)	First Weapon Drawn (2017)

A Fistful of Peril is the third studio album by American hip-hop trio Czarface, which consists of rapper and Wu-Tang Clan member Inspectah Deck and underground hip-hop duo 7L & Esoteric. It was released on October 25, 2016, via Silver Age. The album features guest appearances from Blacastan, Conway The Machine, Jesus Chrysler, Meyhem Lauren, Psycho Les and Rast RFC.

== Track listing ==
All tracks produced by The Czar-Keys & Esoteric

No.	Title	Writer(s)	Length
1.	"Electric Level 1"	S. Ryan; J. Hunter; G. Andrinopoulos; T. Spadafore	0:53
2.	"Two in the Chest"	S. Ryan; J. Hunter; G. Andrinopoulos; T. Spadafore	2:37
3.	"Czar Wars"	S. Ryan; J. Hunter; G. Andrinopoulos; T. Spadafore	2:43
4.	"Dust" (featuring Psycho Les)	S. Ryan; J. Hunter; L. Fernandez; G. Andrinopoulos; T. Spadafore	3:02
5.	"Revenge on Lizard City"	S. Ryan; J. Hunter; G. Andrinopoulos; T. Spadafore	2:22
6.	"Machine, Man, & Monster" (featuring Conway)	S. Ryan; J. Hunter; D. Price; G. Andrinopoulos; T. Spadafore	4:41
7.	"Dare Iz a Darkseid"	S. Ryan; J. Hunter; G. Andrinopoulos; T. Spadafore	3:20
8.	"Tarantulas" (featuring Blacastan)	S. Ryan; J. Hunter; I. Osu; G. Andrinopoulos; T. Spadafore	2:35
9.	"Sabers" (featuring Jesus Chrysler)	S. Ryan; J. Hunter; G. Andrinopoulos; T. Spadafore	3:00
10.	"Steranko" (featuring Meyhem Lauren & Rast RFC)	S. Ryan; J. Hunter; J. Rencher; G. Andrinopoulos; T. Spadafore; Rast RFC	3:47
11.	"Talk That Talk"	S. Ryan; J. Hunter; G. Andrinopoulos; T. Spadafore	3:30
12.	"All in Together Now"	S. Ryan; J. Hunter; G. Andrinopoulos; T. Spadafore	2:53
13.	"Level Electric 1"	S. Ryan; J. Hunter; G. Andrinopoulos; T. Spadafore	0:58
Total length:			36:21

== Personnel ==
- Seamus Ryan – main artist, performer, co-producer, executive producer
- Jason Richard Hunter – main artist, performer, executive producer
- George Andrinopoulos – main artist, producer, executive producer
- Lester Fernandez – featured artist (track 4)
- Demond Price – featured artist (track 6)
- Ira Osu – featured artist (track 8)
- James Rencher – featured artist (track 10)
- Rast RFC – featured artists (track 10)
- Jesus Chrysler – additional vocals (track 9)
- Jeremy Page – guitar, bass & keyboards (tracks: 3, 6, 9, 11)
- Todd Spadafore – producer
- Joseph Caserta – mixing
- Wes Garland – mastering
- Alfredo Rico-Dimas – design & layout
- Benjamin Marra – artwork

== Charts ==
Chart (2016)	Peak position
US Top R&B/Hip-Hop Albums (Billboard)	21
US Top Rap Albums (Billboard)	14
US Independent Albums (Billboard)	28
US Heatseekers Albums (Billboard)	8
