= Inspectah Deck =

American rapper and producer (born 1970)

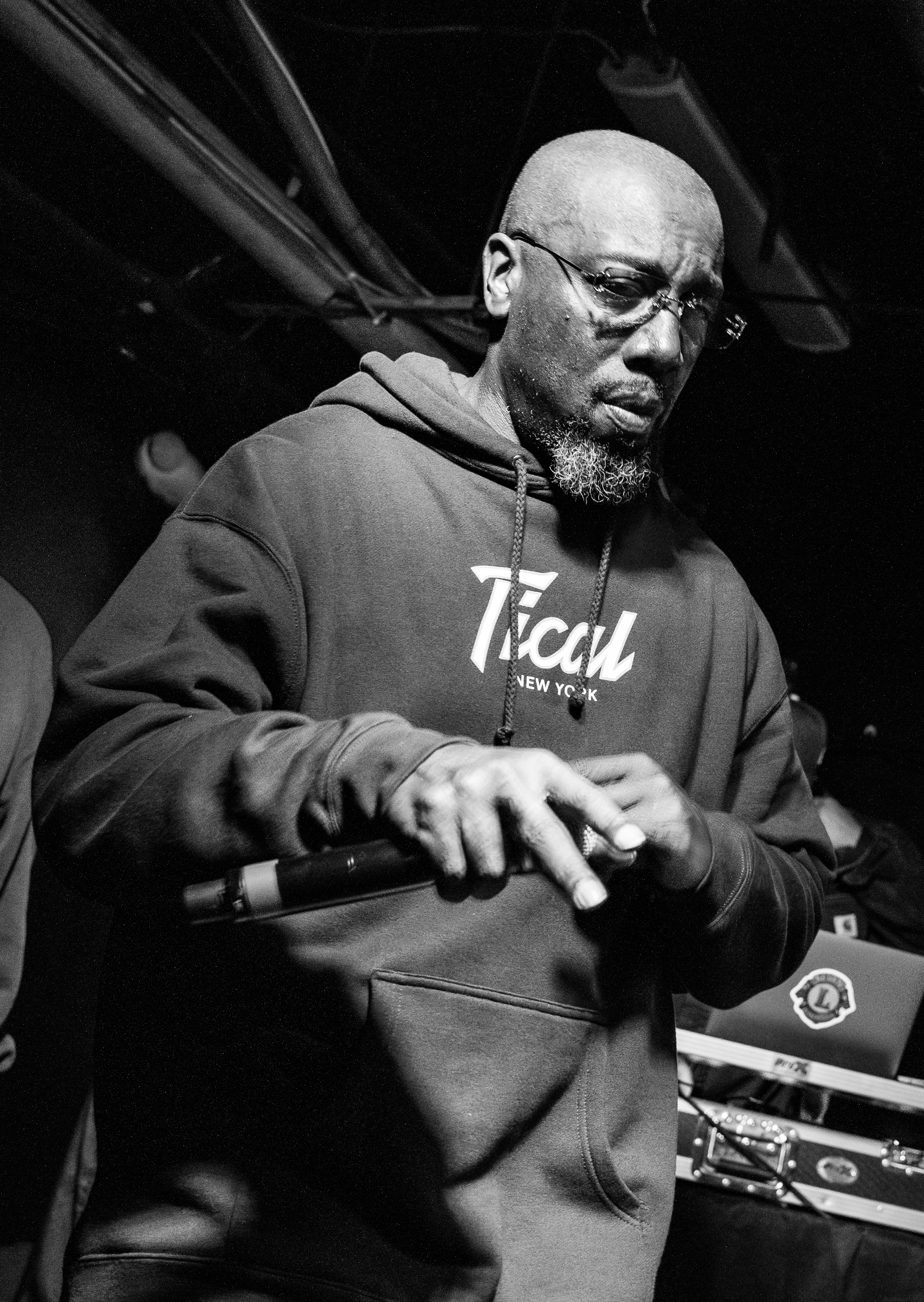
- Inspectah Deck performing in 2024

Background information
- Also known as: Rollie Fingers; Fifth Brother; Rebel INS
- Born: Jason S. Hunter; July 6, 1970 (age 56); The Bronx, New York City, U.S.
- Origin: Staten Island, New York City, U.S.
- Genre: East Coast hip-hop
- Occupations: Rapper; producer
- Years active: 1992–present
- Labels: Loud; Relativity; Koch; Urban Icon; Traffic
- Member of: Wu-Tang Clan; Czarface

Jason S. Hunter (born July 6, 1970), better known by his stage name Inspectah Deck, is an American rapper and hip hop producer. He is a member of the groups Wu-Tang Clan and Czarface.

He has acquired critical praise for his intricate lyricism, and for his verses on many of the group's most revered songs. He has grown to become a producer in his own right, taking up tracks for fellow Wu rappers and his own projects.

== Early life ==
Jason Hunter was born July 6, 1970, in The Bronx and grew up in Staten Island. Hunter routinely mentions the Park Hill Projects in Clifton, Staten Island, where he grew up and went to school with Method Man, Raekwon, Ghostface Killah, and Remedy. Hunter's father died when he was six years old.

== Career ==
Hunter developed a laid-back and quiet personality which he carried into his stage persona, as a low-key counterbalance to the antics of Method Man, Ol' Dirty Bastard, and RZA, referenced by Method Man at the end of the track "Can it Be All So Simple?" on Wu-Tang's debut album Enter the Wu-Tang (36 Chambers):

Inspectah Deck, he's like that dude that'll sit back and watch you play yourself and all that right? And see you sit there and know you lying; and he'll take you to court after that, cause he the Inspectah.

Despite this inconspicuous persona, Inspectah Deck maintained a relatively high profile, as he was the second most featured member on the album, and provided highly acclaimed verses for the singles "C.R.E.A.M.," "Protect Ya Neck," "Wu-Tang Clan Ain't Nuthing ta Fuck Wit," and "Da Mystery of Chessboxin'." In the years following, Hunter would appear on several Wu members' solo projects, including Method Man's Tical (1994), Raekwon's Only Built 4 Cuban Linx… (1995), GZA's Liquid Swords (1995), and Ghostface Killah's Ironman (1996). On Wu-Tang's second group album, Wu-Tang Forever (1997), Deck produced the track "Visionz" and contributed a solo track, "The City", as well as writing one of the most critically acclaimed verses in hip-hop on the group's hit single "Triumph". He would also provide production for some of his Wu cohorts, including "Elements" and "Spazzola" for Method Man's Tical 2000: Judgement Day (1998), "Kiss of a Black Widow" for RZA's RZA as Bobby Digital in Stereo (1998), and the title track for GZA's Beneath the Surface (1999).

=== Solo career ===
Inspectah Deck was originally supposed to be featured on the track "Got My Mind Made Up" by 2Pac for his album All Eyez on Me along with Lady of Rage, however both artists were cut out at Shakur's request. The song went on to feature Tha Dogg Pound, Redman, and Deck's fellow Wu-Tang Clan member Method Man. Despite his verse being cut out, he can still be heard at the end of the song saying "INS the rebel" before it fades out. His debut album Uncontrolled Substance was initially set for a 1995 release on Loud Records, on which he signed for $650,000. But after Loud was acquired by Sony, it was delayed and set to release in late 1997, however, this experienced several additional delays due to a flood in producer RZA's basement studio, which destroyed over one hundred beats, including all of the instrumentals made for the album. In September 1999, Uncontrolled Substance was released, and featured more of Deck's own production, and appearances from several lesser known affiliates. The album received generally favorable reviews from music critics, but failed to garner the reception attained by earlier Wu-Tang solo projects. Shortly after this release, Deck returned to the Wu-Tang fold for the group albums The W (2000), and Iron Flag (2001).

In 2003, Inspectah Deck released his second studio album, The Movement, which he would later state did not live up to his expectations, and in 2006, he released The Resident Patient, intended as a prequel to The Movement. In 2007, the rapper reconvened with the Wu-Tang Clan to record the group album 8 Diagrams. Along with Raekwon, and Ghostface Killah, Inspectah Deck partook in the controversy, sparked when several group members disparaged RZA's tight artistic control of the album, championing Ghost's album The Big Doe Rehab. In regards to these disagreements, Deck stated in an interview:

I feel like we have to give them a newer, better album such as the new Ghost album. I’m not saying that’s the truth either. I’m just saying that his album sounds like what a Wu-Tang album should sound like, but it’s him by himself.

Around this time he announced two new projects: an album called Czarface as a new collaboration called Czarface with Boston's 7L & Esoteric featuring the legendary DJ Premier and his up-coming solo album The Rebellion, confirming production from RZA and the Wu-Elements; it is now set to come after The Resident Patient II, and will reportedly be his final album as a solo artist.

On March 23, 2010, Inspectah Deck released his fourth solo album Manifesto, which features guest-appearances from Raekwon, Cormega, Termanology, Planet Asia, Cappadonna, Kurupt, and M.O.P.'s Billy Danze. In 2008, a mixtape entitled The Resident Patient II was leaked onto the internet; this features some original material, as well as freestyles over other artists' songs. Inspectah Deck stated in an interview that The Manifesto was meant to be the originally announced full-length sequel, Resident Patient II.

Since early 2010, Inspectah Deck has begun work on Czarface and The Rebellion, and has expressed his interest in working with several Wu-Tang members, as well as Snoop Dogg, E-40, Nas and Jadakiss on the album. He had mentioned in an interview with Conspiracy Radio that he will only retire from solo albums if the fans don't show support for The Manifesto and The Rebellion. He has also mentioned his plans to release an instrumental album of his own production, entitled The Bodyrock Volume 1, which is inspired by the instrumental albums released by Alchemist, Ayatollah, and Pete Rock. On February 11, 2013, in an interview with HipHopDX, Inspectah Deck stated that he also has an upcoming album with producer Agallah in the works, and later confirmed during that year that he had renamed his "The Rebellion" album to Rebellion 2013. He recently confirmed via Twitter that he has again changed the name of his final album to Uncontrolled Substance II, a sequel to his debut album; that will be produced primarily by RZA along with The Wu-Elements.

After working with The Wu-Tang Clan on their sixth studio album A Better Tomorrow, he reunited with 7L & Esoteric for another Czarface album titled Every Hero Needs a Villain, which was released in June 2015, and again in 2016 for the third Czarface album, A Fistful of Peril, after Marvel Entertainment reached out to them to record a track for their Black Panther web-series.

== Discography ==
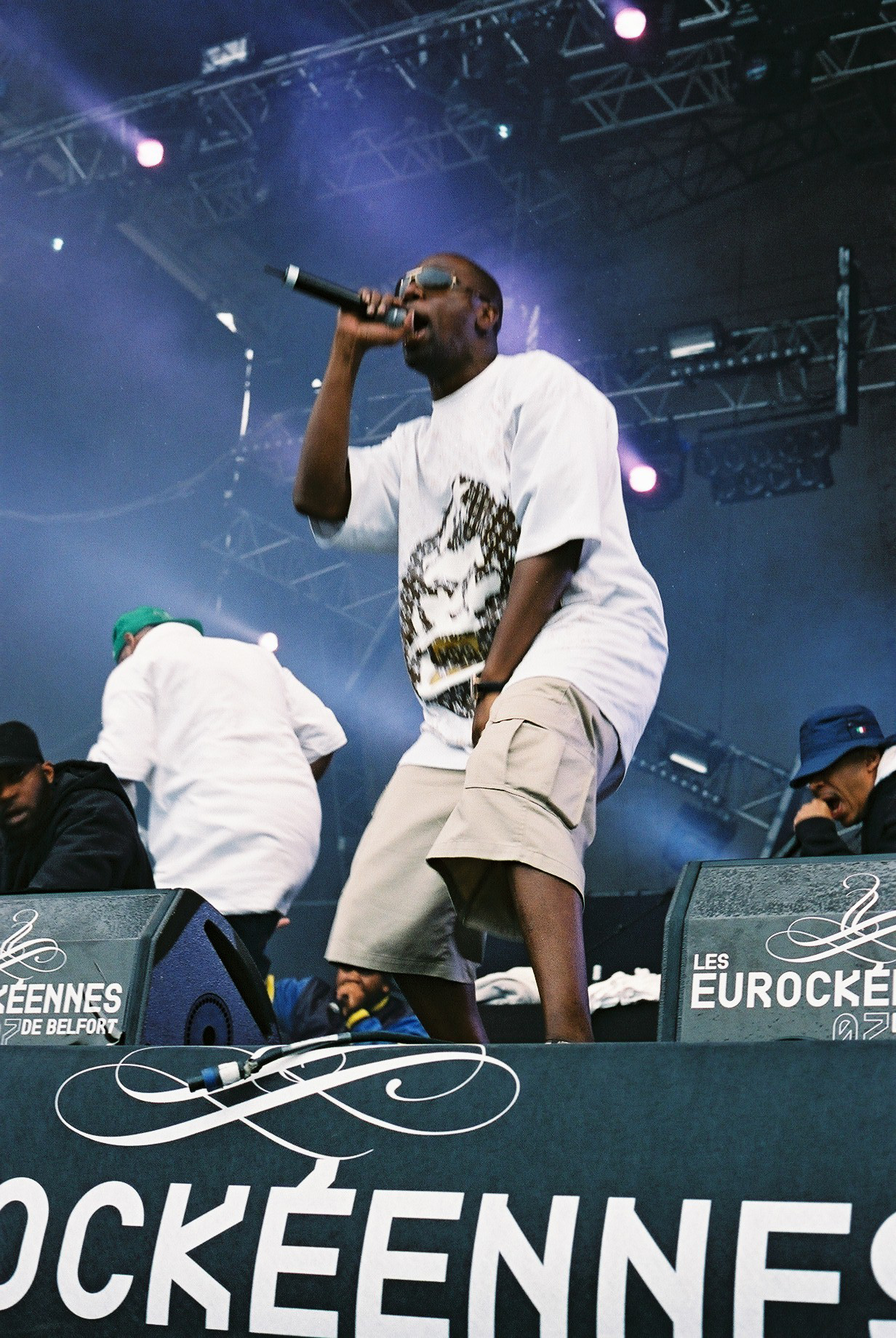
Inspectah Deck performing with Wu-Tang Clan in 2007

Studio albums

- Uncontrolled Substance (1999)
- The Movement (2003)
- The Resident Patient (2006)
- Manifesto (2010, reissued in 2026)
- Chamber No. 9 (2019)
- Dragon's Breath (2026)

with Czarface

- Czarface (2013)
- Every Hero Needs a Villain (2015)
- A Fistful of Peril (2016)
- First Weapon Drawn (2017)
- Double Dose of Danger (2019)
- The Odd Czar Against Us (2019)
- Czar Noir (2021)
- Czarmageddon (2022)
- Czartificial Intelligence (2023)

Collaboration albums with Czarface

- Czarface Meets Metal Face (with MF Doom) (2018)
- Czarface Meets Ghostface (with Ghostface Killah) (2019)
- Super What? (with MF Doom) (2021)
- Everybody Eats! (with Kool Keith) (2024)
- Czarface Meets Frankie Pulitzer (with Tom Hardy) (2026)
