= Czarface Meets Ghostface =

2019 collaborative studio album

Studio album by Czarface & Ghostface Killah
- Released: February 15, 2019
- Genre: Hip-hop
- Length: 39:34
- Label: Silver Age
- Producers: 7L; Jeremy Page

Czarface chronology
| Czarface Meets Metal Face (2018) | Czarface Meets Ghostface (2019) | The Odd Czar Against Us (2019) |

Ghostface Killah chronology
| The Lost Tapes (2018) | Czarface Meets Ghostface (2019) | Ghostface Killahs (2019) |

Singles from Czarface Meets Ghostface
- 1. "Iron Claw" Released: December 4, 2018; 2. "Mongolian Beef" Released: February 12, 2019

Professional ratings
Aggregate scores
| Source | Rating |
|---|---|
| Metacritic | 71/100 |
Review scores
| Source | Rating |
| AllMusic | 4/5 stars |
| Crack Magazine | 6/10 |
| Flood Magazine | 7/10 |
| HipHopDX | 3.4/5 |
| NME | 4/5 stars |
| RapReviews | 7.5/10 |

Czarface Meets Ghostface is a collaborative studio album by American hip-hop supergroup Czarface and Wu-Tang Clan member Ghostface Killah. It was released on February 15, 2019 via Silver Age. The album features guest appearances from Kendra Morris.

Along with the singles, music videos were produced for: "Iron Claw", which was released on December 4, 2018, and "Mongolian Beef", which was dropped on February 12, 2019.

== Track listing ==
All lyrics are written by Jason Hunter, Seamus Ryan and Dennis Coles; all music is composed by The Czar-Keys (George Andrinopoulos & Jeremy Page).

| No. | Title | Length |
|---|---|---|
| 1. | "Back at Ringside" | 1:52 |
| 2. | "Face Off" | 2:56 |
| 3. | "Iron Claw" | 4:13 |
| 4. | "Czarrcade '87" | 2:09 |
| 5. | "Powers and Stuff" | 3:27 |
| 6. | "Masked Superstars" | 3:17 |
| 7. | "Morning Ritual" (featuring Kendra Morris) | 2:40 |
| 8. | "Super Soldier Serum" | 3:27 |
| 9. | "The King Heard Voices" (featuring Kendra Morris) | 4:30 |
| 10. | "Listen to the Color" | 5:50 |
| 11. | "Mongolian Beef" | 3:18 |
| 12. | "(Post Credits Scene)" | 1:56 |
| Total length: | | 39:34 |

== Charts ==
| Chart (2019) | Peak position |
|---|---|
| US Top Album Sales (Billboard) | 34 |
| US Independent Albums (Billboard) | 8 |
| US Indie Store Album Sales (Billboard) | 4 |
