= Manifesto (Inspectah Deck album) =

Studio album by Inspectah Deck
- Released: March 23, 2010
- Recorded: 2009–2010
- Studio: View Studio
- Genre: Hip hop
- Length: 1:06:18
- Label: Urban Icon
- Producers: Agallah; Alchemist; Cee The Architech; D-Tox; Flip; Inspectah Deck; J. Glaze; Khino; K. Slack; Lee Bannon; Mike Cash; MoSS; Phenom; Shorty 140; Y-Not Soundsmith

Inspectah Deck chronology
The Resident Patient (2006)	Manifesto (2010)	Chamber No. 9 (2019)

Wu-Tang Clan solo chronology
Ghostdini: Wizard of Poetry in Emerald City (2009)	Manifesto (2010)	Apollo Kids (2010)

Singles from Manifesto
- 1. "The Champion" Released: February 24, 2010

Manifesto is the fourth solo studio album by American rapper Inspectah Deck. It was released on March 23, 2010, via Urban Icons Records. Recording sessions took place at View Studio. Production was handled by Agallah, Alchemist, Cee The Architech, D-Tox, Flip, J. Glaze, Khino, K. Slack, Lee Bannon, Mike Cash, MoSS, Phenom, Shorty 140, Y-Not Soundsmith, and Inspectah Deck himself, who also served as executive producer. It features guest appearances from AC, Billy Danze, Cappadonna, Carlton Fisk, Cormega, Fes Taylor, Kurupt, Meshel, Ms Whitney, Planet Asia, Pleasant, Raekwon and Termanology.

Initially, the album was slated to be titled Resident Patient II, as a sequel to Inspectah Deck's 2006 album The Resident Patient. However, a mixtape entitled Resident Patient II leaked in 2008 that was not the actual product. Deck eventually changed the name of the project and is still planning to release his final album under the name The Rebellion. Manifesto is composed of songs originally cut from Resident Patient II.

== Critical reception ==
Professional ratings
Aggregate scores
Source	Rating
Metacritic	62/100
Review scores
Source	Rating
AllMusic	3.5/5 stars
HipHopDX	2.5/5
Pitchfork	5.2/10
RapReviews	8.5/10
Slant	2/5 stars

Manifesto was met with generally favourable reviews from music critics. At Metacritic, which assigns a normalized rating out of 100 to reviews from mainstream publications, the album received an average score of 62 based on four reviews.

Pedro Hernandez of RapReviews stated: "the material found on Manifesto is, for the most part, superb, with only a handful of tracks that fail to live up to the quality found on the rest of the album". AllMusic's Matt Rinaldi wrote: "still, despite a handful of throwaway cuts, Manifesto has more than enough heat to prove that Deck's mike skills still stand up up to any of his Wu brethren".

In mixed reviews, Ian Cohen of Pitchfork resumed: "as Manifesto runs through its forbidding 20-track playlist, it unsurprisingly falters when it chases Hot 97 spins that are laughably out of reach". Huw Jones of Slant summed up with "the album does have some decent moments though. It's just unfortunate that they're all exhausted by the record's 20-minute mark".

== Track listing ==
Manifesto track listing
No.	Title	Writer(s)	Producer(s)	Length
1.	"Tombstone Intro"	Jason Richard Hunter	J. Glaze	1:38
2.	"The Champion"	Hunter	Alchemist	2:48
3.	"Born Survivor" (featuring Cormega)	Hunter; Cory McKay	MoSS	3:16
4.	"This Is It"	Hunter	Dtox	3:11
5.	"Luv Letter" (featuring Fes Taylor & Ms. Whitney)	Hunter; Fes Taylor	Inspectah Deck	4:03
6.	"P.S.A."	Hunter	Lee Bannon	1:43
7.	"T.R.U.E." (featuring Meshel)	Hunter	Inspectah Deck	3:10
8.	"We Get Down"	Hunter	Y-Not	2:55
9.	"The Big Game" (featuring Raekwon & AC)	Hunter; Corey Woods	PHENOM	4:58
10.	"Tombstone Interlude"	Hunter	J. Glaze	1:39
11.	"9th Chamber Part II"	Hunter	Inspectah Deck; Khino	3:12
12.	"Really Real" (featuring Carlton Fisk & Fes Taylor)	Hunter; George Cooney; Taylor	Inspectah Deck	4:56
13.	"Serious Rappin'" (featuring Termanology & Planet Asia)	Hunter; Daniel Domingo Carrillo; Jason Green	Mike Cash	4:05
14.	"Do What U Gotta"	Hunter	Flip	3:13
15.	"Crazy"	Hunter	J. Glaze	3:17
16.	"Gotta Bang" (featuring Kurupt & Billy Danze)	Hunter; Ricardo Emmanuel Brown; Eric Murray	Shorty 140	3:43
17.	"The Bad Apple"	Hunter	K. Slack	3:12
18.	"Brothaz Respect" (featuring Cappadonna & Fes Taylor)	Hunter; Darryl Hill; Taylor	Cee The Architek	3:52
19.	"5 Star G"	Hunter	MoSS	2:53
20.	"The Neverending Story" (featuring Pleasant)	Hunter	Agallah	4:34
Total length:				1:06:18

== Charts ==
Chart (2010)	Peak position
US Top R&B/Hip-Hop Albums (Billboard)	69
