= Czarface =

American hip-hop super group

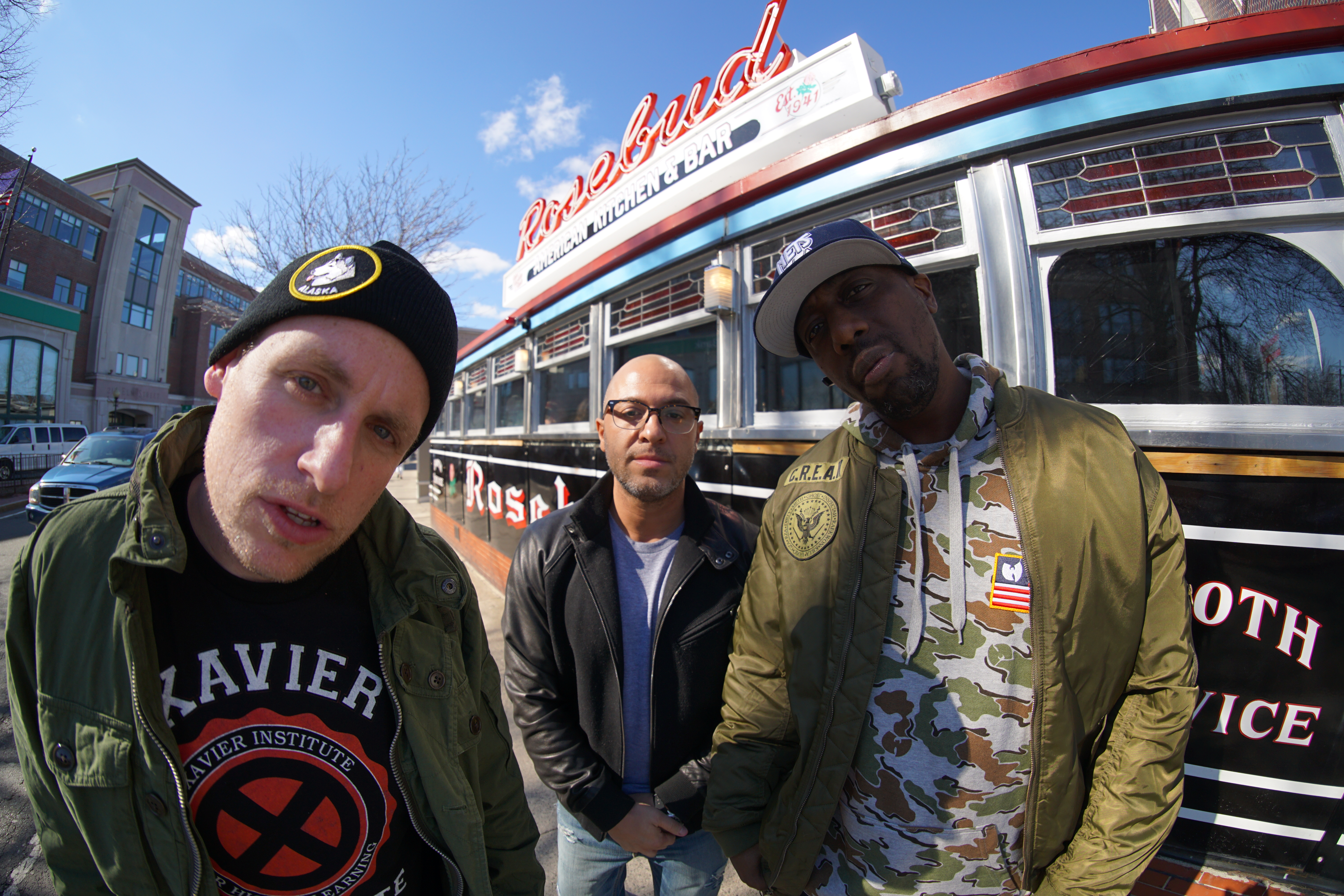
- Czarface's Esoteric, 7L and Inspectah Deck

Background information
- Genres: East Coast hip-hop; alternative hip-hop
- Years active: 2013–present
- Labels: Brick Records; Silver Age; Virgin Music Group
- Members: Inspectah Deck; 7L; Esoteric

Czarface (/ˈzɑːrfeɪs/; often stylized in all caps) is an American hip-hop supergroup formed in 2013 by underground hip-hop duo 7L & Esoteric and Wu-Tang Clan member Inspectah Deck. They released their acclaimed debut album, Czarface, on February 19, 2013. The album was followed by Every Hero Needs a Villain in 2015 and A Fistful of Peril in 2016, both of which were also praised by critics. They released the collaborative album Czarface Meets Frankie Pulitzer with Frankie Pulitzer in 2026.

== History ==
Inspectah Deck told Paul Meara of HipHopDX in February 2013, that the album had no goals, but to "create something worth listening to". Inspectah Deck had worked with 7L & Esoteric on tour and two previous tracks: the duo's song "Speaking Real Words" from the 2001 album The Soul Purpose and "12th Chamber" from their 2010 album 1212. From 2013 onward, the trio decided to release further collaborations under the singular “Czarface” moniker. Esoteric spoke of the album's origin as fun between friends, which ultimately led to a character that represented all three members.

Inspectah Deck shared with Vice that the character's name intentionally draws a parallel to "Scarface," as they intend for their collaborative rap persona to elicit the same respect as cult followers do for the movie's titular character.

In 2017, the group began collaborating on tracks with a pseudonymous rapper under the moniker of Frankie Pulitzer, whose true identity was revealed to be English actor Tom Hardy. An album, Czarface Meets Frankie Pulitzer, was released on August 28, 2026; it also features Busta Rhymes, Method Man and El-P.

== Discography ==
=== Studio albums ===
List of studio albums, with selected details and peak chart positions
Year	Title	Label	Formats	Peak chart positions						Notes
Year	Title	Label	Formats	US	US R&B/HH	US Rap	US Ind.	US Heat.	US Taste	Notes
2013	Czarface	Brick Records	CD, LP, cassette, digital download	—	34	20	45	—	—	
2015	Every Hero Needs a Villain	Brick Records	CD, LP, cassette, digital download	—	15	15	19	4	15	
2016	A Fistful of Peril	Silver Age	CD, LP, digital download	—	21	14	28	8	—	
2017	First Weapon Drawn	Silver Age	LP, digital download	—	—	—	44	16	—	
2018	Czarface Meets Metal Face	Silver Age	CD, LP, cassette, digital download	134	—	—	5	1	5	Recorded with MF Doom
2019	Czarface Meets Ghostface	Silver Age	CD, LP, cassette, digital download	—	—	—	8	—	4	Recorded with Ghostface Killah
2019	Double Dose of Danger	Silver Age	LP, digital download	—	—	—	—	—	—	
2019	The Odd Czar Against Us	Silver Age	CD, LP, digital download	—	—	—	—	—	—	
2021	Super What?	Silver Age	CD, LP, cassette, digital download	—	—	—	—	—	—	Recorded with MF Doom
2021	Czar Noir	Silver Age	LP	—	—	—	—	—	—	
2022	Czarmageddon!	Silver Age	CD, LP	178	—	—	26	1	—	
2023	Czartificial Intelligence	Silver Age	CD, LP, cassette	—	—	—	—	7	—	
2024	Everybody Eats!	Silver Age	CD, LP, cassette	—	—	—	—	—	—	Recorded with Kool Keith
2026	Czarface Meets Frankie Pulitzer	Silver Age	CD, LP, cassette, digital download	96	—	—	—	—	—	Recorded with Frankie Pulitzer

=== EPs ===
Year	Title	Label	Notes
2018	Man's Worst Enemy	Silver Age	Recorded with MF Doom
2019	Dog Days of Tomorrow	Silver Age	
2021	Good Guys, Bad Guys	Silver Age	

=== Music videos ===
Year	Album title	Song title	Director	Featured artist
2013	Czarface	Air 'em Out	McFarland & Pecci	
2013	Czarface	Hazmat Rap	McFarland & Pecci	
2015	Every Hero Needs a Villain	The Great (Czar Guitar)	Sev One Media	
2015	Every Hero Needs a Villain	Sgt. Slaughter	Sev One Media	
2018	Czarface Meets Metal Face	Bomb Thrown	Kendra Morris	MF Doom
2018	Czarface Meets Metal Face	Meddle with Metal	James Reitano	MF Doom
2019	Czarface Meets Ghostface	Mongolian Beef	Shawn A. Johnson	Ghostface Killah
2019	Czarface Meets Ghostface	Powers and Stuff	Josh Mac	Ghostface Killah
2020	The Odd Czar Against Us	Couch	DJ Manipulator	
2020	The Odd Czar Against Us	Bizarro	Mike Pecci	
2023	Czartificial Intelligence	Czarchimedes' Death Ray	Hoku & Adam	
2026	Czarface Meets Frankie Pulitzer	All It Takes Is One Bad Day	James Reitano	Frankie Pulitzer
2026	Czarface Meets Frankie Pulitzer	Mad Technology	Andy To Steve "Sweatpants" Irvy	Frankie Pulitzer Method Man
