= Every Hero Needs a Villain =

Studio album by Czarface
- Released: June 16, 2015
- Recorded: 2014–2015
- Genre: Hip-hop
- Length: 55:03
- Label: Brick Records
- Producer: The Czar-Keys

Czarface chronology
Czarface (2013)	Every Hero Needs a Villain (2015)	A Fistful of Peril (2016)

Singles from Every Hero Needs a Villain
- 1. "Deadly Class" Released: April 7, 2015

Every Hero Needs a Villain is the second studio album by American hip-hop trio Czarface, which consists of rapper and Wu-Tang Clan member Inspectah Deck and underground hip-hop duo 7L & Esoteric. The album was released on June 16, 2015, by Brick Records. The album's lead single "Deadly Class" featuring Meyhem Lauren was released on April 7, 2015. The album features guest appearances from Method Man, Large Professor, JuJu, GZA, MF Doom, Meyhem Lauren and R.A. the Rugged Man.

== Critical reception ==
Professional ratings
Aggregate scores
Source	Rating
Metacritic	79/100
Review scores
Source	Rating
The Boston Globe	(positive)
Exclaim!	8/10
HipHopDX	3.5/5 stars
RapReviews	7/10
Record Collector	4/5 stars

Every Hero Needs a Villain received generally positive reviews from music critics. At Metacritic, which assigns a weighted mean rating out of 100 to reviews from mainstream critics, the album received an average score of 79, based on 5 reviews, which indicates "generally favorable reviews". Kyle Mullin of Exclaim! said, "7L handles the no-frills production, which is rife with early '90s RZA homages on 'Night Crawler' and the aforementioned 'World Premiere.' But the Bostonian beatsmith also experiments with crunchy classic rock style guitar riffing on 'Czartacus' and 'The Great (Czar Guitar).' Those beats prove to be a dynamic soundtrack for Esoteric and Deck's shameless, endlessly entertaining punch lines, which are bizarrely charming enough to leave you rooting for the bad guy." Justin Ivey of HipHopDX said, "Every Hero Needs a Villain is one of the rare sequels that matches the original in quality. The chemistry built on the first CZARFACE album carries over seamlessly to their second effort as Inspectah Deck, 7L & Esoteric seem tailor made to work with one another. 7L’s underrated production shines and perfectly complements the styles of Deck and Esoteric. CZARFACE may know they're playing to a niche audience who desires a return to glory days of the ‘90s, but the execution is where CZARFACE differs from most nostalgic acts."

== Commercial performance ==
The album debuted at number 15 on the US Billboard Top R&B/Hip-Hop Albums in the first week of its release.

== Track listing ==
All tracks are produced by The Czar-Keys

No.	Title	Length
1.	"Don the Armor"	1:18
2.	"Czartacus"	2:37
3.	"Lumberjack Match"	2:46
4.	"Nightcrawler" (featuring Method Man)	3:22
5.	"World Premier" (featuring Large Professor)	2:50
6.	"The Great (Czar Guitar)"	2:25
7.	"Red Alert"	3:46
8.	"Junkyard Dogs" (featuring JuJu)	3:33
9.	"Sgt. Slaughter"	2:10
10.	"When Gods Go Mad" (featuring GZA)	4:16
11.	"Ka-Bang!" (featuring MF Doom)	2:52
12.	"Deadly Class" (featuring Meyhem Lauren)	2:59
13.	"Escape from Czarkham Asylum"	8:18
14.	"Sinister"	2:59
15.	"Good Villains Go Last" (featuring R.A. the Rugged Man)	3:52
16.	"Deviatin' Septums" (Digital Exclusive)	2:49
17.	"Sinister (Revenge of Yorgo Remix)" (Digital Exclusive)	2:11
Total length:		55:03

== Charts ==
Chart (2015)	Peak position
US Top R&B/Hip-Hop Albums (Billboard)	15
US Indie Store Album Sales (Billboard)	15
US Independent Albums (Billboard)	19
US Heatseekers Albums (Billboard)	4
