= Czarface (album) =

Studio album by Czarface
- Released: February 19, 2013
- Recorded: 2012
- Genre: Hip-hop
- Length: 46:41
- Label: Brick Records
- Producer: 7L; Todd Spadafore; DJ Premier

Czarface chronology
Czarface (2013)	Every Hero Needs a Villain (2015)

Czarface (stylized in all caps) is the debut studio album by American hip-hop supergroup Czarface. The album was released on February 19, 2013, by Brick Records. The album features guest appearances from Roc Marciano, Oh No, Ghostface Killah, Action Bronson, Cappadonna and Vinnie Paz. The album's production comes from 7L, Spada4 and DJ Premier.

== Critical reception ==
Professional ratings
Aggregate scores
Source	Rating
Metacritic	77/100
Review scores
Source	Rating
Exclaim!	7/10 stars
HipHopDX	4/5 stars
PopMatters	6/10 stars
Q	4/5 stars
XXL	(XL)

Czarface was met with generally favorable reviews from music critics. At Metacritic, which assigns a weighted mean rating out of 100 to reviews from mainstream critics, the album received an average score of 77, based on 7 reviews, which indicates "generally positive reviews". Omar Burgess of HipHopDX gave the album four out of five stars, saying "CZARFACE has no major flaws. It’s obviously not for everyone, yet even when incorporating current critical favorites like Action Bronson and Mr. Muthafuckin' eXquire, no compromises are made. Inspectah Deck, 7L & Esoteric use '90s East Coast Hip Hop as a blueprint to innovate, and ultimately, that’s what made that era so special in the first place." Bryan Hahn of The Source gave the album a positive review, saying "Czarface doesn't fall short of what it wanted to accomplish-knocking the chumps out the ring. It doesn't pretend to deliver positive messages for the kids or even tell heart wrenching stories about the hood. Plain and simple, 7L masterminded sinister beats while Esoteric and Inspectah Deck recruited some fellow emcees to show the potential of the often-mislead art of lyricism can sound like. Long live, Czarface." Mark Bozzer of Exclaim! gave the album a seven out of ten, saying "Minus all of the corny sound bites, this album undoubtedly keeps the underground renaissance sizzling."

Bogar Alonso of XXL gave the album an XL, saying "Mention of the ‘90s, hip-hop’s supposed last golden era, might make some queeze, and for good reason. Hip-hop purists have long sucked on the decade like a warm thumb, afraid of the cold, mean world that lay ahead. But CZARFACE, also the name for Deck and co.’s group, keeps matters as fresh. The album’s marquee—with names like Roc Marciano, Action Bronson, and Mr. Muthafuckin' eXquire—assures just that. “Cement 3’s,” “It’s Raw,” and “Poisonous Thoughts”―listed in the order of appearance of the guests mentioned―come off as love letters rather than industry rub-offs. If the above trio were operating in the late ‘90s, they’d be dropping similar heat."

== Commercial performance ==
The album debuted at number 34 on the US Billboard Top R&B/Hip-Hop Albums in the first week of its release.

== Track listing ==
No.	Title	Producer(s)	Length
1.	"Czarface" (Intro)	7L	1:16
2.	"Air ‘Em Out"	7L; Todd Spadafore	2:41
3.	"Cement 3′s" (featuring Roc Marciano)	7L; Todd Spadafore	3:25
4.	"Czar Refaeli" (featuring Oh No)	7L; Todd Spadafore	4:00
5.	"Rock Beast"	7L; Todd Spadafore	2:55
6.	"Savagely Attack" (featuring Ghostface Killah)	7L	3:20
7.	"Marvel Team-Up"	7L	2:27
8.	"It’s Raw" (featuring Action Bronson)	7L; Todd Spadafore	4:47
9.	"Let It Off"	DJ Premier	4:22
10.	"Word War 4"	7L	2:51
11.	"Dead Zone"	7L	2:56
12.	"Poisonous Thoughts" (featuring Mr. Muthafuckin' eXquire)	7L	4:04
13.	"Shoguns" (featuring Cappadonna and Vinnie Paz)	7L	4:40
14.	"Hazmat Rap"	7L; Todd Spadafore	2:57
Total length:			46:41

Extended Second Edition Bonus Track
No.	Title	Producer(s)	Length
15.	"Rock Beast (Death Czar Remix)"	7L	2:37
