= That Handsome Devil =

American rock band

Background information
- Origin: Boston, Massachusetts, U.S.
- Genres: Experimental rock; alternative rock; alternative hip hop
- Years active: 2004–present
- Labels: 16 Entertainment; Arts & Crafts Recordings; Stardust/Traffic; Modern Savage Recordings; Virgin Music Group; Vydia
- Members: Christian James "Godforbid" Oppel; Jeremy Page; Naoko Takamoto; Evan Sanders; Jeremy Siegel; Sam Merrick; Andy Bauer; Deflon Sallahr

That Handsome Devil, often shortened to THD, is an American rock band from Brooklyn, New York, by way of Boston, Massachusetts.

The band mixes genres such as rock, funk, jazz, jive, blues, surf, rhythm and blues, reggae, rockabilly, rap, and psychedelic. Their sound has also been described as "equal parts Screamin’ Jay Hawkins, bizarre electronica, creepy hip hop and in-your-face gonzo rock". Gypsy jazz has been used in description of the band while frontman Godforbid describes the band's music as "fringe pop".

== History ==
The band was founded by Christian James "Godforbid" Oppel and Jeremy Page. Predating the band's existence, they were both members of the hip-hop group Alaskan Fishermen, along with Thirstin’ Howl III and Father Time. That Handsome Devil released their first single "Dating Tips" in 2004, which featured the songs "Dating Tips", "How to Get Money", and "Don't Go". In 2006, the band released their eponymous debut EP That Handsome Devil, which included the single "Dating Tips". "Elephant Bones", the fourth track on the album, was featured as a bonus song in Guitar Hero II.

Their first studio album, A City Dressed in Dynamite, was released in 2008 to several positive reviews, being praised by Amplifier Magazine as "a madcap musical frenzy as dizzying as it is dazzling". With music as stylistically varied as their last release, the album expanded on the band's themes of emptiness, drug addiction, materialism, and death, and featured their trademark of dated sound bites from the 1950s.

A portion of "Mexico" was featured in the seventh episode of season four of Weeds, "Yes I Can", before A City Dressed in Dynamite was released.

"Rob the Prez-O-Dent" was featured as a playable track in Rock Band 2. This, along with the appearance of "Elephant Bones" in Guitar Hero II, increased their visibility despite the band never having released a full-length album before.

In 2009, their second EP, Enlightenment's for Suckers, was released.

That Handsome Devil went on a national tour named "Hating New People" in the summer of 2010, where they sold small-print discs of previously unreleased singles and covers.

In 2011, That Handsome Devil released their second album, The Heart Goes to Heaven, The Head Goes to Hell, to favorable reviews. This album includes their most listened-to track, "Charlie's Inferno". The band supported the album with a tour and the launch of an independent website. The album was financed in part by a fundraising effort on project startup service Kickstarter, raising $6,013 after a month.

That Handsome Devil announced their fourth EP, The Jungle Book, in 2012, available for free on their website. The album consists of covers of several songs from the original Disney movie.

In September 2014, That Handsome Devil released the first single, "$=♡", from their forthcoming album. In November, the band released the album Drugs & Guns For Everyone on their YouTube channel.

In April 2017, That Handsome Devil released the EP History is a Suicide Note on Bandcamp. The album notably contains heavy political theming in the songs "Pendulumonium" and "Savages", with the latter and a song "Emergency" from the same album having a music video created for them.

In 2021, Your Parents are Sellouts was released as a studio album. The album features themes of crime, such as drug possession, and violence, especially in young people, clearly separating their thoughts from those of older generations.

On October 25, 2024, the band released their next album, Exploitopia. The album covers themes involving religion and continues the band's long tradition of references to addiction and death.

In early 2026, the band's song "Charlie's Inferno" went viral as part of a TikTok edit combining the song with panels from the comic series The Boys. Later in 2026, the band released two new singles titled "Garbage Planet" and "Gentrify the Moon".

== Band members ==
- Christian James "Godforbid" Oppel – vocals, songwriter
- Jeremy Page – guitar, bass, keyboard, banjo, pedal steel guitar, glockenspiel, percussion, accordion, synthesizer, kazoo, backing vocals, songwriter
- Naoko Takamoto – backing vocals
- Evan Sanders – keyboard, trumpet, trombone
- Jeremy Siegel – bass, backing vocals
- Sam Merrick – drums
- Andy Bauer – drums, percussion, accordion, guitar, backing vocals
- Deflon Sallahr – hype man

== Discography ==
=== Studio albums ===
- A City Dressed in Dynamite (2008)
- The Heart Goes to Heaven, The Head Goes to Hell (2011)
- Drugs & Guns For Everyone (2014)
- Your Parents Are Sellouts (2021)
- Exploitopia (2024)

=== EPs ===
- That Handsome Devil (2006)
- Enlightenment's For Suckers (2009)
- Hating New People (2010)
- The Jungle Book (2012)
- History is a Suicide Note (2017)
- 2 For Flinching (2025)

=== Singles ===
- "Face In The Sun" (2003)
- "Chinatown Bench" (2003)
- "Dating Tips/How to Get Money/Don't Go" (2004)
- "Watching You" (2005)
- "Steady and Slow" (2007)
- "Hey White Boy" (2007)
- "Lucky Me" (2008)
- "Mr. Grinch" (2008)
- "Chicken Claw" (2009)
- "Marilyn Loves Heroin" (2009)
- "Disco City" (2009)
- "How to Get More Money (And Not Have to Shoot Somebody)" (2011)
- ”It’s Trump!” (2017)
- ”It Ain’t Easy” (2020)
- “BangBang!!” (2020)
- “Guns of Brixton” (2020)
- “Just A Gigolo” (2020)
- "Ode to the Scumbag" (2025)
- "Charlie 2 (The Money Grab)" (2025)
- "Gentrify the Moon" (2026)
- "Garbage Planet" (2026)
