= Killah Priest discography =

This is the discography for American hip hop musician Killah Priest.

== Albums ==
=== Solo albums ===
List of albums, with selected chart positions
Year	Album	Peak chart positions	
Year	Album	US	US R&B
1998	Heavy Mental	24	4
2000	View from Masada	73	18
2001	Priesthood	—	—
2003	Black August	—	—
2007	The Offering	—	—
2008	Behind the Stained Glass	—	—
2009	The Exorcist	—	—
2009	Elizabeth	—	—
2010	The 3 Day Theory	—	—
2013	The Psychic World of Walter Reed	—	—
2015	Planet of the Gods	—	—
2020	Rocket to Nebula	—	—
2021	Lord Sun Heavy Mental 1.1	—	—
2021	Summer End Cafe	—	—
2022	The Three Fantastic Supermen EPics	—	—
2022	Horrah Scope	—	—
2022	Mother	---	---
2023	Forest of the Happy Ever After	—	—
2023	Vedic Vape Room	—	—
2024	Abraxas Rebis Simha Pleroma	—	—
2025	Abraxas 2	^{__}	---

=== Mixtapes ===
Year	Mixtape
2009	The Untold Story of Walter Reed
2009	I Killed The Devil Last Night
2016	Wu-Goo (with Ghostface Killah)
2017	The Untold Story of Walter Reed Pt. 2
2020	Journey to the Planet of the Gods
2024	The Untold Story of Walter Reed Pt. 3

=== Collaborative albums ===
Album information
The Last Shall Be First with Sunz of Man
- Released: July 21, 1998
- Label: Red Ant Entertainment
- Singles: "Natural High", "Shining Star"/"Cold", "The Plan"/"Collaboration '98"
The First Testament with Sunz of Man
- Released: January 31, 1999
- Label: Red Hook Records
- Singles: "Deep in the Water"/"In the Beginning..."/"The Sins of Man",
  "Who are the Sunz of Man?"/"The Valley of Death"/"Bring Back the Mike"/"Valley of Kings"
The Horsemen Project with The HRSMN
- Released: 2003
Black Market Militia with Black Market Militia
- Released: March 22, 2005
- Singles: "Audobon Ballroom"/"Thug Nation"/"Hood Lullabye", "Gem Stars (Remix)"/"Mayday!"
The Spooks Who Kicked Down Tha Doorz with Maccabeez
- Released: 2005
Original S.I.N. with Almighty
- Released: July 22, 2008
- Singles: "Obey (The Statesmen)"
Beautiful Minds with Chief Kamachi
- Released: September 23, 2008
Historic EP with The HRSMN
- Released: 2014
The Goddess And The Priest EP with Bliss
- Released: 2015
The Infinite Universe with Vendetta Kingz
- Released: January, 2016
Death in the Arena with Moon Crickets (Killah Priest, Lord Fury and DJ Mercilless)
- Released: November 15, 2017
- Label: Supreme Genes Records/Moon Crickets Inc.
Don't Sit on the Speakers, Vol. 1 with 4th Disciple
- Released: November, 2017
The Rebirth with Sunz of Man
- Released: August 2, 2019
- Label: X-Ray Records
The Third Eye in Technicolor with Jordan River Banks
- Released: December 8, 2020
Divine Intervention with True Master
- Released: April 8, 2021
The Last Ride with HRSMN
- Released: June 18, 2021
Ragnarok with Shaka Amazulu The 7th
- Released: September 27, 2021
The Mantra with Shroom
- Released: November 12, 2021
Savage Sanctuary with Holocaust/Warcloud
- Released: March 18, 2022
Mr Universe with Jordan River Bank
- Released: November 1, 2022

=== Unreleased and unfinished albums ===
Album information
Nothing New Under the Sun with Sunz of Man
- Info: Unreleased, planned for 1996
- Label: Wu-Tang/Priority Records
- Singles: Soldiers of Darkness/Five Arch Angels, No Love Without Hate, Bloody Choices
Holy of Holies with Remedy
- Info: Unreleased, announced in 2007
Untitled with Rasul Allah (of Lost Children of Babylon) as G-Ciples
- Info: Unreleased, announced in 2009
Untitled with GZA
- Info: Unreleased
Untitled with Black Market Militia
- Info: Rumoured, second Black Market Militia album
Untitled with Maccabeez (Killah Priest, Timbo King and Hell Razah)
- Info: Unreleased
All Praise is Due with Almighty
- Info: Unreleased, follow up to Original S.I.N. with the original members
- Label: IHipHop Distribution/Babygrande Records
Behind the Stained Glass Pt. 2
- Info: Unreleased, some material appeared on later albums
- Label: Good Hands Records/Proverb Records
The End is Near with The HRSMN
- Info: Unreleased, second The HRSMN album
- Singles: Impossible (feat. RBX)
Keys Of Solomon EP with Aslan
- Released: TBA
The Creation of Care with RawzChyld
- Released: TBA
- Singles: Run On/Amen Ra/Illuminati
The Lamb's Supper with Hell Razah as Thug Vaticans
- Released: TBA
- Singles: New Millennium Child
Natural Born Killers with Ghostface Killah
- Released: TBA
Castle Hop (produced by DJ Woool)
- Released: TBA

== Singles ==
Year	Single	B-Side	Album
1995	B.I.B.L.E. (Basic Instructions Before Leaving Earth)		Liquid Swords
1998	"Cross My Heart" (feat. Inspectah Deck & GZA)		Caught Up (soundtrack)/Heavy Mental
1998	"One Step" (feat. Hell Razah)	"Street Opera" + "Moanin'"	Heavy Mental
1998	"If You Don't Know" (feat. Ol' Dirty Bastard)	"Blessed Are Those"	Heavy Mental
2000	"Whut Part of the Game?" (feat. Ras Kass)		View from Masada
2000	"I'm Wit That"	"Gotta Eat"	View from Masada
2001	"My Hood"	"C U When I Get There"	Priesthood
2003	"When I'm Writing"	"Excalibur"	Black August
2003	"Do The Damn Thing"	"Robbery (Remix)" (feat. Elephant Man)	Black August
2007	"Gun for Gun (Rivers of Blood)" (feat. Nas)	"Happy" (feat. Stori James)	The Offering
2007	"Truth B Told"	"The Offering" (feat. Hell Razah)	The Offering
2009	"The 7 Crowns of God"		Elizabeth
2012	"Brilliantaire"		

== Guest appearances ==
- 1994 "Diary of a Madman"; "Graveyard Chamber" (off the Gravediggaz album 6 Feet Deep)
- 1995 "Where Ya At?"; "Wicked Ways" (with Sunz Of Man) [off the charity comp. album One Million Strong]
- 1995 "Snakes"; "Proteck Ya Neck II The Zoo"; "Don't U Know" (off the Ol' Dirty Bastard album Return to the 36 Chambers: The Dirty Version)
- 1995 "Greyhound, Pt. 2" (off the Jon Spencer Blues Explosion album Experimental Remixes)
- 1995 "4th Chamber"; "B.I.B.L.E. (Basic Instructions Before Leaving Earth)" (off the GZA album Liquid Swords)
- 1996 "America" (with Wu-Tang Clan) (off the AIDS compilation album America Is Dying Slowly)
- 1996 "Parle (Hip-Hop Remix)" (off the Kavalier album Nikera)
- 1997 "Repentance Day" (off the Gravediggaz album The Pick, the Sickle and the Shovel)
- 1998 "Degree Zero" (off the DJ Spooky album Riddim Warfare)
- 1998 "No Superstar" (off the Bounty Killer album Next Millennium)
- 1999 "5 Boroughs" (with KRS-One, Buckshot, Cam'Ron, Redman, Run, Keith Murray, Prodigy, & Vigilante) (off The Corruptor Soundtrack)
- 1999 "Temple of the Mental" (off the Material album Intonarumori)
- 1999 "Beneath the Surface; 1112; Feel Like an Enemy" (off the GZA/Genius album Beneath The Surface)
- 2000 "Horsementality" (off the Canibus album 2000 B.C.)
- 2000 "Im a Horseman (Promo)" (on Tim Westwood's Radio 1 Rap Show with HRSMN members Canibus & Ras Kass)
- 2001 "Bread of Life" (off the Cappadonna album The Yin and the Yang)
- 2001 "Catechism" (with DJ Spooky off the Wu-Chronicles, Chapter 2)
- 2001 "In Here" (off the Guru album Baldhead Slick & Da Click)
- 2002 "Catechism Part 2" (with DJ Spooky)
- 2002 "Out tha Spot” (with Kurupt) (Released: 2002 (Unknown))
- 2002 "No Chaser" (with Raze, Hot Rod, & Fokis) (also released in 2003 by Raze on "Leavin Empty Shells")
- 2002 "Pillars of Ivory" (with the Artfull Dodgers) from the album Second Wind
- 2003 "Who We Are" (from the Elephant Man album Good 2 Go)
- 2004 "Masters Degree" (with Block McCloud, Jean Grae, & Pumpkinhead on/off album Uncle Howie)
- 2004 "Ain't No Way" ((with the HRSMN) off the unreleased album Catch Me If You Can)
- 2004 "Never Imagined" (with Main Flow & Master Foul, off the album Hip-Hopulation)
- 2004 "Chains" (from R.A. the Rugged Man album Die, Rugged Man, Die)
- 2004 "Secret Rivals" (off the Masta Killa album No Said Date)
- 2004 "Saviorself" (off the Jedi Mind Tricks album Legacy of Blood)
- 2005 "Champions" (with SoulStice); "Wannabattle Tactics" (with Buckshot & Donte) (off Main Flow album Notebook Assassins)
- 2005 "Horsemen" (by Pak-Man and the HRSMN off the Pak-Man album Chow Time)
- 2005 "The Saints" (with Nas!) (From the Dirty Harry mixtape The Warriors)
- 2005 "The 10 Plagues" (by Socalled off the Socalled album The Socalled Seder)
- 2005 "Testimony" (with SHI 360 and Remedy)
- 2006 "Beastin" (from the Chino XL album Poison Pen)
- 2006 "Constant Dreams" (from The UNDC album Closed captioned)
- 2006 "Pagan Helmets" (from Neurologists album As The Dark Settles)
- 2007 "Awaiting the Hour" (From The Ill Bill mixtape Black Metal)
- 2007 "Divine Sacred" (from Lightborn album "The Psychology of Fire")
- 2007 "Shall I Continue" (from Gumz album From Fetus to Genius...)
- 2007 "In The Name Of AllaH" (from the Cilvaringz album I)
- 2007 "Liquid Wordz" (from the Canibus album For Whom the Beat Tolls)
- 2007 "Taarruz Basladi" (from the Ako-Akonomi album)
- 2007 "Build" (from the Contribution X album Cobra Of The North)
- 2007 "Law & Order" (from the iCON the Mic King & Chum album Mike and the Fatman)
- 2007 "Picture of Selassie I (Remix)" (from the Picture of Selassie album by Khari Kill Feat. Jah Bami)
- 2008 "Galaxies" (from the Praxis album Profanation (Preparation for a Coming Darkness))
- 2008 "Eat Ya Food" (from the Brooklyn Zu album Chamber #9, Verse 32)
- 2008 "Bloody Moon" (from VoodooCore {Shaka Amazulu The 7th & Wasabifunk})
- 2008 "One Day" (From Endemic (Terminal Illness) ft. Killah Priest & Timbo King)
- 2008 "Theory of Dominance" (with Corown Da Sensei/Da Shogunz)
- 2008 "Se7en" (With Shaka Amazulu The 7th ft. Timbo King)
- 2008 "Walking the Line" (with Annakin Slayd from the album Stalwart Empire)
- 2008 "Immaculate for the Babylon A.D. Film" (With Michael Arkangelo and Shakura Holiday Prod by RZA and Shavo (Achozen))
- 2009 "Babylon Beast" (from the Heavyweight Dub Champion album Rise of the Champion Nation)
- 2009 "Where I Come From (Remix)" (with Tha Advocate, Willy Northpole, Hussein Fatal, Stat Quo, DoItAll, Big Lou, Sha Stimuli, Mr. probz)
- 2009 "God is Love" (from the U-God album Dopium)
- 2009 "XL" (from the Deep Rooted album D.E.E.P.R.O.O.T.E.D)
- 2009 "Memoir of a Gravedigga" (from Shaka Amazulu The 7th [Black Stone of Mecca album] ft. 9th Prince, Warcloud, Frukwan, and Shabazz The Disciple)
- 2009 "Murder" (with Chino XL & Sean Price, off the DJ-JS1 album "Ground Original 2- No Sellout")
- 2010 "Sovereign Skies" (From Kdb & St. Peter album "Within The Solace")
- 2010 "Soul Purpose" (from Dusty Philharmonics album "The Audiotopsy", Unexpected Records)
- 2010 "Purified Thoughts" feat GZA/Genius (From Ghostface Killah Apollo Kids)
- 2011 "Wu Crime" feat GZA/Genius (from Raekwon Shaolin vs. Wu-Tang)
- 2011 "Picture Perfect" Tragic Allies feat. Killah Priest (from Tragic Allies debut album The Tree of Knowledge of Good & Evil)
- 2011 "Emerald Cypher" Canibus Feat. Killah Priest, Born Sun, K-Rino (Lyrical Law)
- 2011 "B.E.N." feat. Killah Priest (from Raise the Bridges album "Beauty in the Trenches")
- 2013 "Among Us" (from the DUS album Ambassadors)
- 2015 "Mysteries" with Tragic Allies (from Flip album Reflections)
- 2015 "Lonely" with Judah Priest and Cappadonna (from Judah Priest single Lonely)
- 2015 "MoonRockin" Reverie Feat. Kurupt
- 2015 "Madd Theories" Judah Priest
- 2016 "For The Future Of Hip-Hop feat. Pugs Atomz & Awdazcate" by Bryan Ford
- 2016 "The Orchard"by Jmega the God & Corto Maltez
- 2021 "Cleopatra's nose by Switch
