= Canibus discography =

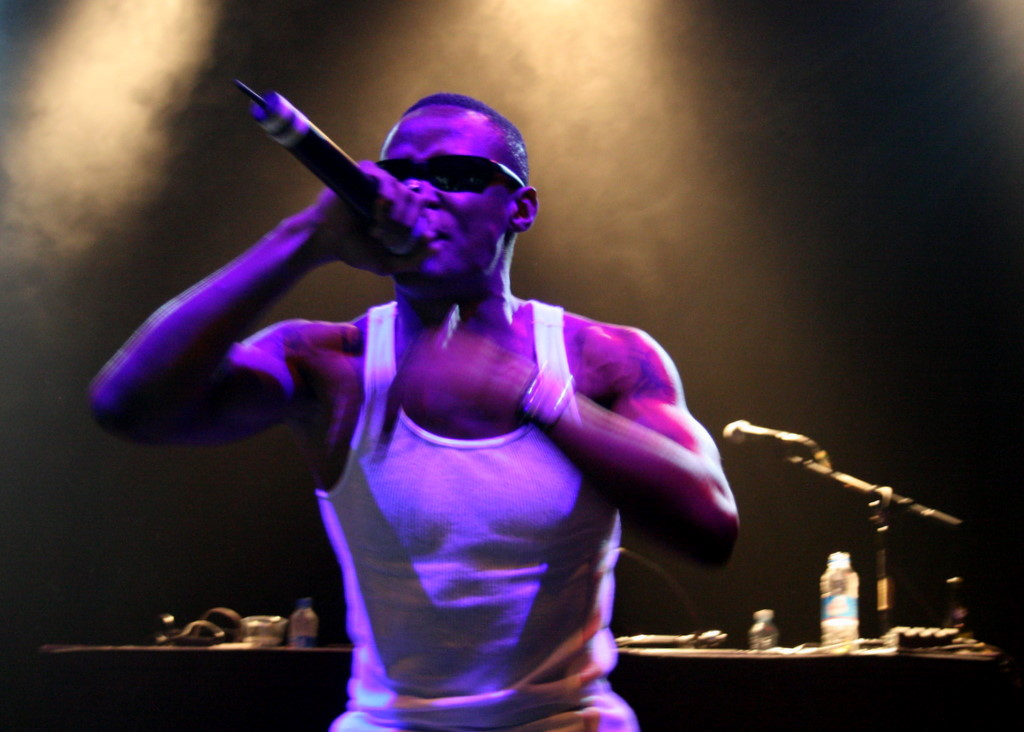
Canibus performing in 2007

This is the discography of Canibus, an American rapper.

== Studio albums ==
List of albums, with selected chart positions
Title	Album details	Peak chart positions		Certifications
Title	Album details	US	US R&B	Certifications
Can-I-Bus	Released: September 8, 1998; Label: Universal; Format: CD, cassette, digital download	2	2	RIAA: Gold
2000 B.C. (Before Can-I-Bus)	Released: July 18, 2000; Label: Universal; Format: CD, cassette, digital download	23	6	
C! True Hollywood Stories	Released: November 13, 2001; Label: Archives Music; Format: CD, digital download	—	71	
Mic Club: The Curriculum	Released: November 19, 2002; Label: Mic Club; Format: CD, digital download	—	—	
Rip the Jacker	Released: July 22, 2003; Label: Babygrande; Format: CD, digital download	194	34	
Mind Control	Released: June 21, 2005; Label: Tommy Boy; Format: CD, digital download	—	79	
Hip-Hop for Sale	Released: November 1, 2005; Label: Babygrande; Format: CD, digital download	—	—	
For Whom the Beat Tolls	Released: June 5, 2007; Label: Mic Club; Format: CD, digital download	—	—	
Melatonin Magik	Released: February 2, 2010; Label: War Lab; Format: CD, digital download	—	91	
C of Tranquility	Released: October 5, 2010; Label: Interdependent Media; Format: CD, digital download	—	70	
Lyrical Law	Released: June 24, 2011; Label: Canibus; Format: CD, digital download	—	—	
Fait Accompli	Released: June 10, 2014; Label: RBC Records; Format: CD, digital download	—	—	
Time Flys, Life Dies... Phoenix Rise	Released: May 12, 2015; Label: RBC Records; Format: CD, digital download	—	—	
Full Spectrum Dominance	Released: June 22, 2018; Label: That's Hip Hop Music; Format: CD, digital download	—	—	
Full Spectrum Dominance 2	Released: September 7, 2018; Label: That's Hip Hop Music; Format: CD, digital download	—	—	
Full Spectrum Dominance 3	Released: January 11, 2019; Label: That's Hip Hop Music; Format: CD, digital download	—	—	
Full Spectrum Dominance Repolarization	Released: March 29, 2019; Label: That's Hip Hop Music; Format: CD, digital download	—	—	
Kaiju	Released: December 10, 2021; Label: Fat Beats Records; Format: CD, digital download	—	—	
One Step Closer to Infinity	Released: January 28, 2022; Label: Fat Beats Records; Format: CD, digital download	—	—	

== Collaboration albums ==
- The Horsemen Project (with Killah Priest, Kurupt & Ras Kass as the Hrsmn)
  - Release date: October 20, 2003
  - Record label: Think Differently Music/Proverbs Music Inc.
- Def Con Zero (with Phoenix Orion as Cloak-n-Dagga)
  - Release date: October 25, 2005
  - Record label: Head Trauma, First Kut
- In Gods We Trust, Crush Microphones to Dust (with Keith Murray as the Undergods)
  - Release date: May 31, 2011
  - Record label: RBC Records
- Microphone Land (with Jaximus)
  - Release date: July 3, 2021
  - Record label: Self-released
- Self Licking Ice Cream Cone (with Johnny Slash)
  - Release Date: February 24, 2023
  - Record Label: Holy Toledo Productions
- Necksnapper LP (with Chino XL)
  - Release date: April 10, 2026
  - Record label: Q&A Logistics

== Collaboration EPs ==
- Canibus and Keith Murray Are the Undergods (with Keith Murray as the Undergods)
  - Release date: September 29, 2009
  - Record label: Sound Records and Entertainment
- Canibus and Marty McKay EPs
  - Matrix Theory I
    - Release Date: December 2018
  - Matrix Theory II
    - Release Date: March 2019
  - Matrix Theory III
    - Release Date: June 2019
  - Matrix Theory IV
    - Release Date: January 2020
  - Matrix Theory V
    - Release Date: July 2021
  - C (with Pete Rock)
    - Release Date: April 2022

== Compilation albums ==
- The Masterpiece Collection
  - Release date: June 17, 2014
  - Record label: Babygrande Records
- The Almighty Era V.1
  - Release date: March 4, 2022
  - Record label: Holy Toledo Productions

== Independent albums ==
- The Brainstream (2003)
- My Name Is Nobody (2003)
- Mic Club Mixtape Master Volume One (2005)
- The Vitruvian Man (2005)

== Singles ==
Year	Song	US	US R&B	US Rap	CAN	Album
1996	"Music Makes Me High (Remix)" (Lost Boyz feat. Canibus & Tha Dogg Pound)					Non-album single
1997	"4, 3, 2, 1" (LL Cool J feat. Canibus, DMX, Method Man, Redman, Master P)					Phenomenon
1998	"Gone Till November (Remix)" (Wyclef Jean feat. Canibus)					Non-album single
1998	"Second Round K.O."	28	13	3	9	Can-I-Bus
1998	"How Come" (with Youssou N'Dour)	—	—	—	—	Bulworth (soundtrack)
1998	"Another One Bites the Dust" (Video Verson) [Wyclef Jean feat. Free & Canibus]					Small Soldiers (soundtrack)
1998	I Honor U	—	—	18	3	Can-I-Bus
1998	Negronometry	—	—	76	—	Can-I-Bus
2000	"Mic-Nificent"	—	—	23	—	2000 B.C. (Before Can-I-Bus)
2003	"Spartibus"	—	—	—	—	Rip the Jacker
2003	"Indibisible"	—	—	—	—	Rip the Jacker
2010	"Hip-Hop Black Ops"	—	—	—	—	Melatonin Magik
2011	"The Ghost of Hip Hop's Past"	—	—	—	—	Lyrical Law

== Selected guest appearances ==
Year	Song	Artist(s)	Album
1996	"Say It Again (Street Mix)"	Nneka	Non-album single
1997	"Uni-4-Orm"	Heltah Skeltah, Ras Kass	Rhyme & Reason (soundtrack)
1997	"Group Home Family"	The Lost Boyz, A+	Sprung (soundtrack)
1997	"No Doubt (Chuckbone's Ghetto Flava Mix)"	702	—N/a
1997	"Beasts from the East"	The Lost Boyz, Redman, A+	Love, Peace & Nappiness
1997	"My Crew"	The Lost Boyz, A+	Love, Peace & Nappiness
1997	"Making a Name for Ourselves"	Common	One Day It'll All Make Sense
1997	"Desparados"	The Firm	The Firm: The Album
1997	"D.J. Keep Playin' (Black Out Remix)"	Yvette Michele, Black Rob	—N/a
1998	"Snakes & Ladders"	Structure Rize	Capital Rize
1998	"Seriously"	Flip Squad Allstar DJs	Flip Squad Allstar DJs
1998	"No Airplay"	Wyclef Jean, Manhunt	—N/a
1998	"Can't Stop the Shining (Rip Rock Pt. 2)"	Pras	Ghetto Supastar
1998	"All That You Got (Ron G Remix)"	Brian McKnight	—N/a
1998	"Ice Cream Freestyle"	Funkmaster Flex	The Mix Tape, Vol. III
1998	"Pure Uncut (Remix)"	8Ball, DMX, McGruff	—N/a
1998	"Fantastic 4"	DJ Clue?, Big Pun, Cam'ron, Noreaga	The Professional
1999	"Boyz 2 Men"	A+, the Lost Boyz	Hempstead High
1999	"Some Shit"	Keith Murray, Deja Vu	It's a Beautiful Thing
1999	"Canibus Remix"	Sway & King Tech	This or That
1999	"King Piece in the Chess Game"	Slick Rick	The Art of Storytelling
1999	"Watch Who You Beef Wid"	—N/a	Whiteboys (soundtrack) / 2000 B.C.
1999	"Hell"	Pharoahe Monch	Internal Affairs
2000	"Blak Iz Blak"	Mau Maus (Mos Def, Charlie Baltimore, MC Serch, Mums, Cano Grills)	Bamboozled (soundtrack)
2000	"Bop Your Head"	Killah Priest	View from Masada
2000	"Ladies & Willies"	Cap.One	Through the Eyes of a Don
2001	"State vs. Kirk Jones"	Kirk Jones, Guess Who, Rah Digga, Scarred 4 Life, Superb	Blacktrash: The Autobiography of Kirk Jones
2001	"Horsemen Talk"	Killah Priest, Kurupt, Ras Kass	Priesthood
2002	"Who Write the Songs"	Jeymes Samuel	Urban Folk Music: The Prequel
2003	"Tibetan Black Magicians"	Jedi Mind Tricks	Visions of Gandhi
2005	"Adversarial Theatre of Justice"	Grayskul	Deadlivers
2005	"Carnival Survivors"	Wyclef Jean, Machel Montano	The Xtatik Experience
2005	"I Wish You Would"	Sway & King Tech, Chino XL, Royce da 5'9"	Back 2 Basics
2006	"Innovate"	Phoenix Orion, Paranorml	The Beyonders: Time Capsule
2006	"Ambitions"	GRITS	Redemption
2007	"All Clap"	Domingo	The Most Underrated
2007	"Inner G"	Killah Priest, Kurupt, Ras Kass	The Offering
2007	"About That Time"	Termanology	Hood Politics V
2008	"Amazing Stories"	Big John, Esoteric	The Next Step
2008	"One More Bar"	Big John, Esoteric	The Next Step
2009	"Handle the Heights (Stenchman Remix)"	M-80, Bronze Nazareth	Wu-Tang Meets the Indie Culture, Vol. 2: Enter the Dubstep
2010	"War Porn"	Greydon Square	The Kardashev Scale
2013	"Ordo Ab Chao"	Guerrilla Alliance	Empire of Fear
2014	"Fractal 9"	Fugitive 9	"Carbon Harbingers"
2024	"Pendulum Swing"	Rakim, La the Darkman, Kxng Crooked, Chino XL	G.O.D.'S Network- Reb7rth
