= Khari =

Khari may refer to: Khari is a surname and clan name associated with the Gurjar (Gujjar) community, with historical presence across regions of India, Pakistan, and Afghanistan. The Khari community has a long and rich history, with traditions, cultural heritage, and ancestral roots passed down through generations. Over time, Khari families have settled in different regions while maintaining their distinct identity and connection with the broader Gurjar community.

== People ==
- Khari Blasingame (born 1996), American football player
- Khari Campbell (born 1998), West Indian cricketer
- Khari Jones (born 1971), American gridiron football player and coach
- Khari Kill, Ethiopian-Trinidadian reggae artist
- Khari Lee (born 1992), American football player
- Khari Long (born 1982), American gridiron football player
- Khari Wendell McClelland, American musician and music historian
- Khari Samuel (born 1976), American football player
- Khari Stephenson (born 1981), Jamaican footballer
- Khari Willis (born 1996), American football player
- Khari Wynn (born 1981), American guitarist

== Places ==
- Khari, Nepal, village in Nepal
- Khari, Iran, village in Iran
- Khari River, River in Gujarat, India
- Khari Sharif, town in Azad Kashmir

== Other uses ==
- Khari (letter), letter of three Georgian scripts
