= The Hrsmn =

American hip hop group

The HRSMN
- Also known as: The Four Horsemen, HRSMN
- Origin: U.S.
- Genres: Hip hop
- Years active: 1996–present
- Labels: Think Differently Music; Proverbs Music Inc.
- Members: Canibus; Killah Priest; Kurupt; Ras Kass

The Hrsmn (styled The HRSMN; pronounced "Horsemen") is an American hip hop supergroup consisting of the artists Canibus, Ras Kass, Killah Priest, and Kurupt. They have released two albums. The name of the group is in reference to the Four Horsemen of the Apocalypse, who appear in the Book of Revelation from the Bible. The Four Horsemen of the Apocalypse are traditionally named Pestilence, War, Famine, and Death. Throughout the HRSMN songs, there are many references to each of the members representing a specific entity. They are Pestilence (Ras Kass), War (Canibus), Famine (Kurupt), and Death (Killah Priest). They have each frequently appeared on each of the members solo albums, such as Canibus's 2000 B.C. (Before Can-I-Bus) and Killah Priest's Priesthood. Pharoahe Monch was also closely affiliated, acting as the hype man on the leaked "I'm a Horseman (Promo)" and rapping on "Horsemen" from Canibus's 2000 B.C. (Before Can-I-Bus). In August 2000, Canibus listed Monch as the fifth member of the group, though further releases in subsequent years would not include or reference him.

== Career ==
=== 1997 ===
On January 14, the Rhyme & Reason: Original Motion Picture Soundtrack was released, it featured the first collaboration between Ras Kass and Canibus on a track entitled Uni-4-Orm.

=== 1998 ===
Late in March a white label appeared featuring a Hrsmn track titled Abide By. The track featured the same lyrics as later heard in Horsementality (from Canibus's 2000 B.C. (Before Can-I-Bus)), and the beat was from the E-Swift produced Hip Hop Drunkies from the album Likwidation by Tha Alkaholiks. On September the 22nd Ras Kass's second album Rasassination was released, it featured the first collaboration between Ras Kass and Kurupt.

=== 1999 ===
In February in an interview for The Source, Kurupt stated that Dr. Dre and Daz Dillinger would be helping with production on the Hrsmn album. As of now the idea of Dr. Dre and Daz Dillinger handling production on a Hrsmn album has never come to fruition. On October 19 Pharoahe Monch's debut solo album Internal Affairs was released, it featured the first collaboration between Canibus and Pharoahe Monch.

=== 2000 ===
On May 9 Killah Priest's second album View from Masada was released. The album featured two Hrsmn collaborations, the first was a song called What Part of the Game? which featured Ras Kass, and the second was Bop Your Head which featured Canibus. There is also a shoutout in the sleeve stating "Four Horsemen, Canibus, Ras Kass, (Kurupt catch you on the next one)", meaning he was planning on working with Kurupt on his next album. The words "Horsemen, Horsemen" are also briefly repeated by Killah Priest on the outro track.

On August 20 in an interview with RapReviews.com Canibus shed some light on the status of The Hrsmn. He stated the name would be changed from "The Four Horsemen" to just "Horsemen", and under this title Ras Kass, Pharoahe Monch, Killah Priest, and Kurupt would be appearing on his new album, 2000 B.C. (Before Can-I-Bus). He also mentions the idea of other members joining the group, such as Lonnie B and Danja Mowf (from the Supafriendz), and that they are currently looking for more members.

=== 2003 ===
In September Killah Priest stated in an interview that he had not spoken to Ras Kass since he had been locked up but he did say "we’re still going to do the HRSMN joint." Later on in the same month ripthejacker.net reported that Canibus had "been quite busy along with Killah Priest and Ras Kass. They have begun re-recording and building the HRSMN album! It will feature a cast of emcees not before a part of the group and it will be out the Summer of 2004 on Mic Club. Updates will be included in a new Media News section at Micclub.net so stay tuned." A Hrsmn album was never released in 2004 on Mic Club and a "Media News" section on the website never appeared. Also in September during an interview Canibus sparked rumors that other members would be joining the group such as Crooked I, Pak Man, Kool G Rap, Royce Da 5'9", Keith Murray, Journalist, Common, Rakim, Vinnie Paz (from Jedi Mind Tricks), Pace Won and Young Zee (from the Outsidaz), and Lonnie B and Danja Mowf (from the Supafriendz).

In October, Killah Priest and Dreddy Kruger released a nine track album entitled The Horsemen Project, it was released independently through Think Differently Music/Proverbs Music Inc. and was only available to purchase off the internet. Each track featured at least two members of the group as well as an appearance by Pak Man. It is currently unknown who handled the majority of the production on the album, although it is known that Mark Sparks was responsible for two songs.

=== 2004 ===
During January in an interview conducted by AllHipHop.com, Ras Kass stated that Kurupt had contacted him while he was in prison, and that he was currently looking for a major label to distribute a new Hrsmn album.

=== 2005 ===
During March an apparently unreleased Hrsmn track was to emerge on Pak Man's debut album Chow Time, unfortunately the track turned out to be the previously released Horsemen Are Here (which also featured on The Horsemen Project under the shorter title Horsemen). Once again during March, another apparently unreleased Hrsmn track was set to appear in the form of a collaboration with Canibus and Kurupt. The track, titled Not 4 Play, was scheduled to appear on Canibus's new album Mind Control, unfortunately it turned out to be the previously released Scrolls from The Horsemen Project.

Towards the end of March during an interview with RasKass-Central.com, Ras Kass shed some light on the status of a new Hrsmn album:-

We gonna do it, but we gotta do it the right way. It’s cool that Killah Priest let the people get the stuff we did. He gave it to the world and I’m never mad at that. But I don’t think that should be the judgment of what the HRSMN could be, that was just what we was doing at that time. When we do the HRSMN shit it’ll be right. I got big visions for what that album could really be. That shit could be crazy, but it’s gotta be right. Kurupt has some legal contractual shit that he needs to fix, as do I. When shit is right that’s when you do shit. So we’ll do it when shit is right.

For an interview conducted with ThaFormula.com, Killah Priest stated that various members have tracks that were recorded, and he hopes that they can once again come together.

Early in November in an interview with HipHopSite.com Ras Kass stated that once he can sort out his own "business" he would be interest in recording a new Hrsmn album. On November 18 in an interview conducted with HipHopDX.com Ras Kass once again stated his interest in working with The Hrsmn. Towards the end of November during an interview conducted by WuForever.com Killah Priest stated that a new Hrsmn album would be recorded.

=== 2006 ===
On January 23 it was announced that the main members will be present on Killah Priest's then upcoming album The Offering. On Killah Priest's May 1 journal entry at HipHopGame.com he mentioned The Hrsmn and the possibility of a new album. He said "The Horsemen project is definitely going to come. Right now we just have to get Kurupt. He's been doing the Dogg Pound thing, but it's definitely going to come. We have songs recorded and we have more in store."

=== 2007 ===
On the Canibus album For Whom the Beat Tolls Killah Priest is featured together with Sun on the track Liquid Wordz. The Hrsmn also collaborate on Killah Priest's album The Offering on the song "Inner G", produced by 4th Disciple.

=== 2010 ===
Recently, member Kurupt announced plans to effect a Hrsmn reunion album featuring himself, Canibus, Killah Priest and Ras Kass. It was later reported that the group had reformed, with business-related assistance from M-Eighty, A&R and executive producer of Canibus' Melatonin Magik. Recently The Hrsmn have appeared on a track from Ras Kass' newest album 'A.D.I.D.A.S'. In an August 2010 radio interview with Mista Montana, Killah Priest discussed the creation of the Four Horsemen album, stating that they plan to bring in producers from all their camps.

=== 2011 ===
In 2011, a video appeared announcing a summer release date for the group's album. Member Ras Kass described it as a "sintro," or alternately a "trailer," featuring text lyrics to a song called "The End is Near." Kass went on to divulge that the Wu-Tang Clan's RZA will be executive-producing the album, and will produce "two or three" tracks for the album. The group hopes to land production from DJ Premier. Guest appearances will include RBX (their upcoming first single, "Impossible"), RZA, Ghostface Killah and Prodigal Sunn of the Wu-Tang camp, while Mos Def and Pharoahe Monch are "listed as possibilities."

Previously, group member Kurupt revealed that a collaboration with Slaughterhouse was in the works, listing possible titles as "House of Horses" and "The Four Slaughters."

=== 2012 ===
On January 28, 2012, Ras Kass announced that he was resigning from The Hrsmn, and is no longer a part of the group.

=== 2014 ===
In February 2014, there was a post of a few pictures on Twitter and Facebook by Ras Kass and also Canibus & Kurupt's A&R Matthew Markoff with a picture of Kurupt, Ras Kass, & Killah Priest and the words HRSMN 2014. Markoff also added that there will be a new recorded HRSMN track released soon and album coming later.

A new HRSMN track with all the original four members called Historic (featuring Tragedy Khadafi) appeared on Canibus' new album Fait Accompli.

On June 3, 2014, Ras Kass reunited with the group.

=== 2015 ===
In 2015, Killah Priest and Kurupt appeared on Canibus' 14th solo release Time Flys, Life Dies...Phoenix Rise - Killah Priest appeared on a song titled, "Bronze Horses" referring to Bronze Nazareth who produced the album. Kurupt appeared on the track titled "The Kings Sent For Me (Samurydas Remix) ".

=== 2021 ===
On January 8, 2021, Ras Kass released a new Hrsmn track titled "Apocalips Now" on his Bandcamp website. The second Hrsmn album, titled The Last Ride, was released on June 18, 2021.

== Discography ==
Studio albums

- The Horsemen Project (2003)
- The Last Ride (2021)

EPs

- Historic EP (2014)

Guest appearances (group)

- 1998 "Abide By" (from a White label promo 12" vinyl)
- 2000 "Horsementality" (from the Canibus album 2000 B.C. (Before Can-I-Bus))
- 2000 "Im A Horseman (Promo)" (leaked on Tim Westwood's BBC Radio 1 Rap Show)
- 2001 "Horsemen are Here" (leaked on mp3.com/canibusgladiator)
- 2001 "Talkin' the Talk" (leaked on mp3.com/canibusgladiator)
- 2001 "Horsemen Talk" (from the Killah Priest album Priesthood)
- 2004 "Ain't No Way" (from the unreleased Ras Kass album Catch Me If You Can)
- 2005 "Horsemen" (from the Pak Man album Chow Time)
- 2005 "Hrsmn Talk" (from the Canibus album Mic Club Master Volume One)
- 2007 "Inner G" (from the Killah Priest album The Offering)
- 2010 "This Shit Right Here" (from the Ras Kass album A.D.I.D.A.S)
- 2010 Impossible (feat. RBX) (first single new album)
- 2014 "Historic" (feat. Tragedy Khadafi) (from the Canibus album Fait Accompli)

Guest appearances (solo)

- 1994 "Wake Up Show Anthem '94" (Ras Kass & Chino XL) (Feat. Lauryn Hill, NaS, Organized Konfusion, Foxy Brown, Shyheim, & Saafir)
- 1996 "Music Makes Me High (L.T. Hutton Extended Club)" (Kurupt & Canibus) (from the Lost Boyz 12" single Music Makes Me High)
- 1996 "Riiiot!" (Chino XL & Ras Kass) (from the Chino XL album Here To Save You All)
- 1996 "Wake Up Show Freestyle" (Ras Kass & Chino XL) (Feat. KRS-One)
- 1997 "Uni-4-Orm" (Ras Kass & Canibus) (from the Rhyme & Reason: Original Motion Picture Soundtrack)
- 1998 "Ice Age" (Ras Kass & Kurupt) (from the Ras Kass album Rasassination)
- 1999 "Future Flavaz" (Ras Kass & Canibus)
- 1999 "Hell" (Pharoahe Monch & Canibus) (from the Pharoahe Monch album Internal Affairs)
- 1999 "4 Bars" (Canibus & Killah priest) (unknown)
- 2000 "Shit's Goin' Down Tonite" (Kurupt & Ras Kass) (Feat. Da Nation)
- 2000 "Wake Up Show Freestyle" (Ras Kass & Canibus) (Feat. Krondon)
- 2000 "Wake Up Show Vol. 7" (Ras Kass & Canibus)
- 2000 "Horsemen" (Pharoahe Monch) (from the Canibus album 2000 B.C. (Before Can-I-Bus))
- 2000 "Whut Part of the Game?" (Ras Kass & Killah Priest) (from the Killah Priest album View From Masada)
- 2000 "Bop Your Head" (Killah Priest & Canibus) (from the Killah Priest album View From Masada)
- 2002 "My Bloc" (Ras Kass & Kurupt) (from the Caz album Goin Head Up)
- 2002 "Out Tha Spot" (Killah Priest & Kurupt) (unknown)
- 2003 "The Dungeon" (Canibus & Kurupt) (from the Canibus mixtape My Name Is Nobody)
- 2003 "Vengeance" (Killah Priest & Ras Kass) (from the Killah Priest album Black August Revisited)
- 2003 "Militant" (Killah Priest & Kurupt) (from the Killah Priest album Black August Revisited)
- 2003 "Horsemen Enforcements" (Ras Kass & Kurupt) (from the Canibus mixtape The Brainstream)
- 2003 "That's Gangsta (Ras Kass & Kurupt)" (from the Ras Kass mixtape Ras Kass Presents... Re-Up (The Compilation))
- 2004 "Can You See What I See" (Ras Kass & Pharoahe Monch) (from the 12" single Can You See What I See/Hands High)
- 2005 "I Wish You Would" (Canibus & Chino XL) (from the Sway & King Tech album Back 2 Basics)
- 2005 "Tha Dungeon" (Canibus & Kurupt) (from the Canibus album Mic Club Master Volume One)
- 2006 "Beastin'" (Chino XL & Killah Priest) (from the Chino XL album Poison Pen)
- 2006 "Collateral Damage" (Canibus & Chino XL) (from the Phathom album Poetical Minded)
- 2007 "Liquid Wordz" (Killah Priest & Canibus) (from the Canibus album For Whom the Beat Tolls)
- 2007 "Gun for Gun (Remix)" (Killah Priest & Kurupt) (unknown)
- 2008 "Do This" (Canibus & Chino XL) (Feat. Bekay) (from The Shuko album The Foundation)
- 2008 "Vital Million" (Canibus & Chino XL) (Feat. Sun)
- 2009 "Do This" (Canibus & Chino XL) (from the Shuko album The Foundation)
- 2009 "Build My Rhyme" (Canibus & Killah Priest) (from the mixtape Digital Dynasty Volume Six: Hosted By Stat Quo)
- 2009 "Architects" (Canibus & Killah Priest) (from the RA EL album Noir World)
- 2009 "Murder"(Chino XL & Killah Priest) (from the DJ JS-1 album Ground Original 2: No Sell Out)
- 2009 "Milli Vanilli"(Killah Priest & Ras Kass) (from the Ras Kass album Quarterly and the Promo Disc for the Killah Priest album Elizabeth)
- 2009 "Suicypher" (Canibus & Chino XL) (Feat. Copywrite)
- 2010 "California Dreaming" (Chino XL & Ras Kass) (Feat. I-Man)
- 2010 "Democracy"(Canibus & Killah Priest) (from the Killah Priest album The 3 Day Theory)
- 2010 "Gangsters" (Killah Priest & Ras Kass) (from the Elusive album District 2 District)
- 2010 "Go Get It" (Kurupt & Ras Kass) (from DBD Blk Lyfe's album The Movement Vol. 1)
- 2010 "Scenario 2012" (Chino XL & Ras Kass) (from the Ras Kass album A.D.I.D.A.S.)
- 2010 "Smoke Sumthin’" (Ras Kass & Kurupt) (from the Cypress Hill SmokeOut Compilation)
- 2010 "The Chosen Show" (Chino XL & Ras Kass) (Feat. Crown Royale, Bishop Lamont, Guilty Simpson, Med, Tres Styles, Fashawn, Marvwon, & One Be Lo) (from the Rhettmatic and Buff1's album Crown Royale)
- 2010 "When I Speak"(Killah Priest & Ras Kass) (from the mixtape Digital Dynasty Vol. 13)
- 2011 "Cypher Of Five Mics" (Ras Kass & Chino XL) (from Canibus album Lyrical Law Disc 1)
- 2011 "Cypher Of Five Mics" (Ras Kass & Chino XL) (with Flawless The MC) (from Canibus album Lyrical Law Disc 2)
- 2011 "Illuminati" (Killah Priest & Ras Kass) (from the mixtape Cage Vs Cons Soundtrack)
- 2011 "Natural Born Skiller" (Canibus & Chino XL) (Feat. Thirstin Howl The 3rd, Keith Murray, & Sadat X) (from the Thirstin Howl The 3rd album Natural Born Skiller)
- 2011 "The Emerald Cypher (Feat. Killah Priest & Canibus) with Born Sun & K-Rino (from the Canibus album Lyrical Law (Disc 1))
- 2011 "The Emerald Cypher (Feat. Killah Priest & Canibus) with Born Sun, Flawless The MC, & K-Rino (from the Canibus album Lyrical Law (Disc 2))
- 2011 "The Emerald Cypher (Promo Remix) (Feat. Killah Priest & Canibus)
- 2011 "The Final Hour" (Canibus & Killah Priest) with Riveria Regime (from Riveria Regime's album "Chaotic Temple")
- 2011 "The Golden Cypher (Feat. Ras Kass & Canibus) with K-Solo (from the Canibus album Lyrical Law (Disc 1))
- 2011 "The Golden Cypher (Feat. Ras Kass & Canibus) with K-Solo & Pilot (from the Canibus album Lyrical Law (Disc 2))
- 2012 "Deadly, Deadly" (Kurupt and Chino XL) (with Esoteric and Big John)
- 2012 "3 The Hard Way" (Feat. Ras Kass & Kurupt) with Crooked I (from the Crooked I mixtape Psalm 82:6)
- 2013 "Gangster" (Killah Priest & Ras Kass) (Feat. Riot & Agallah The Don)
- 2013 "How Can I" (Ras Kass & Canibus)
- 2013 "Musiquarium Radio Part IV" (Canibus & Chino XL) (Feat. Vinnie Paz, Tash, Flawless The MC, & DZK) (from The Architect's Musiquarium Vol. 2)
- 2013 "The Rapture" (Canibus & Chino XL) (Feat. Planet Asia, Cappadonna, & Crooked-I) (from The Almighty album The 2nd Coming)
- 2014 "Black Devils" (Canibus & Killah Priest) with Rasul Allah 7 (from Rasul Allah 7's album "Heru the Face of the Golden Falcon: Rise of the Shemsu Ha")
- 2014 "H2O" (Ras Kass & Pharoahe Monch) with & Rakaa Iriscience (from the Ras Kass album Blasphemy)
- 2015 "Bodies" (Killah Priest, Ras Kass, & Canibus) (Feat. Micah Scale)
- 2015 "M.A.S.H." (Ras Kass & Kurupt) (from the Ras Kass album titled Breakfast At Banksy's)
- 2015 "Marauders" (Ras Kass & Canibus) (Feat. Sean Price, Ruste Juxx, Sars, & DJ Q-Fingaz)
- 2015 "Type" (Ras Kass & Chino XL) (Feat. Luckyiam)
- 2017 "Animation" (Ras Kass & Chino XL) (Feat. GQ Nothin Pretty)
- 2017 "Ghost In The Shell" (Ras Kass & Pharoahe Monch) (Feat. ChanHays & Ghettosocks) (from ChanHays album Here)
- 2017 "Ebonic Ebola" (Killah Priest, Canibus, & Ras Kass) (from the album by The Architect titled "Masterpiece Theater")
- 2017 "Lyrics Still Matter" (Canibus & Chino XL) (Feat. FNX)
- 2017 "Street Fighter" (Ras Kass, Kurupt, & Killah Priest) from the Ras Kass mixtape "Year End Closeout"
- 2018 "Combat Ready" (Canibus & Chino XL) (Feat. D.V. Alias Khryst) (from Armada EP The Formula)
- 2019 "Eye Queue" (Ras Kass, Canibus, & Chino XL) (Feat. KXNG Crooked, Krayzie Bone, & Rappin 4 Tay)
- 2019 "Heaven" (Ras Kass, Canibus, & Chino XL) (Feat. KXNG Crooked & Pyrit)
- 2019 "I Want More" (Ras Kass, Canibus, & Chino XL) (Feat. KXNG Crooked, Krayzie Bone, & Pyrit)
- 2019 "Where The Coins At?" (Ras Kass, Canibus, & Chino XL) (Feat. Krayzie Bone, KXNG Crooked, Rappin' 4-Tay, Spice 1, The Dayton Family, B.G. Knocc Out, Pyrit, G. Battles, El Gant, & Jake Palumbo)
- 2020 "A Cure For Wellness (Remix) (Canibus & Chino XL) (Feat. Marty McKay) (from Canibus & Marty McKay EP The Matrix Theory IV)
- 2020 "The Myth" (Ras Kass & Chino XL) (Feat. Twista, KXNG Crooked, & Jake Palumbo)
