= Beautiful Minds =

Beautiful Mind or Beautiful Minds may refer to:

- Beautiful Minds (album), a 2008 collaborative album from rappers Killah Priest and Chief Kamachi
- Beautiful Minds (TV programme), a 2010–2012 British documentary television programme that aired on BBC Four
- Beautiful Minds (film), a 2021 French film

== See also ==
- Beautiful Mind (album), a 2022 studio album by Rod Wave
- A Beautiful Mind (disambiguation)
