= Priesthood (disambiguation) =

Priesthood is the role or office of a priest.

Priesthood may also refer to:

- Priesthood (ancient Israel)
- Priesthood (Catholic Church)
- Priesthood (Community of Christ)
- Priesthood (Latter Day Saints)
- Priesthood (Eastern Orthodox Church)
- Priesthood (LDS Church)
- The Priesthood of all believers
- Priesthood (album), an album by Killah Priest
