= Fugitive 9 =

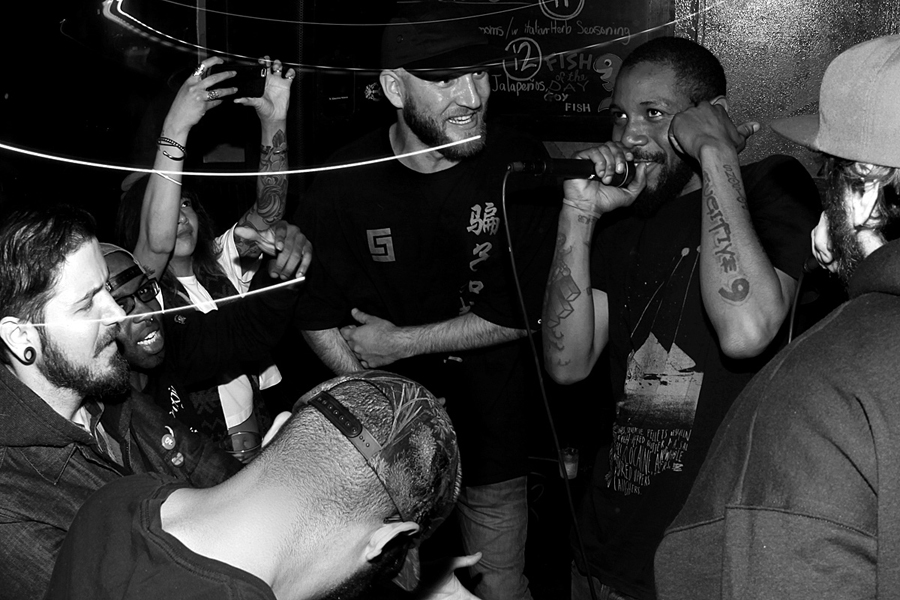

Background information
- Origin: Norfolk, VA
- Genre: Hip hop
- Years active: 2001–present
- Members: Think Sphinxes; Whyze Oner; Moe Hendrix; Cuda Brown; Delta Automatik; Sintax Zero; Dyslexia

Fugitive 9 is a hip-hop collective formed in 2001 in Norfolk, Virginia. Members currently include Think Sphinxes, Whyze Oner, Moe Hendrix, Cuda Brown, Delta Automatik, Sintax Zero, and Dyslexia. They have collaborated with several well known artists, such as Chad Hugo of The Neptunes, Killah Priest of the Wu-Tang Clan, and Canibus.

Https://fugitive9.bandcamp.com https://soundcloud.com/catpryme

             999

== Discography ==
- Critical Massive Volume 1 (2013)
- Immobilize (2013)
- Carbon Harbingers (2013)
- Steel Helix Tape (2014)
- Vision Alpha (2016)
