= Mind Control (Canibus album) =

Studio album by Canibus
- Released: June 21, 2005
- Recorded: 2001
- Genre: Hip-hop
- Length: 46:39
- Labels: Gladiator Music, Tommy Boy
- Producer: Mark Sparks

Canibus chronology
Rip the Jacker (2003)	Mind Control (2005)	Hip-Hop for Sale (2005)

Professional ratings
Review scores
Source	Rating
AllHipHop	2/5 stars
RapReviews	7/10

Mind Control, is the sixth studio album by American rapper Canibus, released on June 21, 2005, through Gladiator Music and Tommy Boy Records. The album was originally recorded in 2001 before C True Hollywood Stories and was released to complete a contractual agreement Canibus had with Gladiator Music. Mark Sparks produced the album, which features guest appearances from Kurupt, Free Marie and Pakman.

== Background ==
Before the album's release, AllHipHop.com reported that the album would contain material on Canibus' experiences in the U.S. Army. However, the album contained tracks that most Canibus fans had already heard. "33 3's", "Canibus Man", and "Last Laugh" were leaked in 2001. "Atlanta", "Gybaotc", "Stupid Producers", and "Nobody" were released on his mixtape My Name Is Nobody (2003), and "Not 4 Play" was released as "Scrolls" on The Horsemen Project (2003). The rest of the album contains three unreleased songs: "Mind Control", "In the Rain", and "Talk the Talk". Mind Control was recorded in 2001 before C! True Hollywood Stories (2001) and contractually came out by chance in 2005, pushing back the release of his 2005 album, Hip-Hop for Sale. The album was released on Gladiator Music, a label that Canibus formed in 2001 with Ricky Lee, the executive producer of his second album, 2000 B.C..

On October 25, 2005, Canibus released Def Con Zero on Head Trauma Records as part of the group Cloak-n-Dagga. The same day, the webmaster of the label's website interviewed Canibus, Phoenix Orion, and Dewey Cooper. According to the webmaster, Canibus had an agreement with Ricky Lee and Gladiator Records that if Canibus died during his army period, Gladiator could make a big profit by releasing these rare recordings. Nothing had happened to Canibus in the army, but Gladiator still released the album.

== Initial reaction ==
The initial reaction to Mind Control was negative. On the bonus DVD that came with Def Con Zero, Canibus spoke on the album:

Interviewer: Can you explain why Mind Control is your least popular release?
Canibus: Mind Control was recorded in 2001 and released nationally in 2005. My fans and the Canibus brotherhood have become too advanced to accept exceptionally mediocre material. I understand and so do they. Thank you.

== Track listing ==
- All tracks produced by Mark Sparks

No.	Title	Length
1.	"33 3's"	2:12
2.	"Canibus Man"	4:46
3.	"Atlanta"	5:35
4.	"Gybaotic" (Featuring Free Marie)	5:15
5.	"In the Rain"	4:21
6.	"Mind Control"	4:13
7.	"Last Laugh"	5:16
8.	"Not 4 Play" (featuring Kurupt)	4:11
9.	"Stupid Producers"	3:43
10.	"Talk the Talk"	3:35
11.	"Nobody"	3:21
