= Jakki tha Motamouth =

American rapper

- Also known as: Jakki da Motamouth; Jakki the Motamouth
- Born: Jakki Rubin; May 15, 1976 (age 50)
- Origin: Columbus, Ohio, United States
- Genres: Hip hop
- Occupation: Rapper
- Years active: 1998-present
- Labels: Babygrande Records; NCS Records; Ear to the Grind Music; Man Bites Dog Records

Jakki Rubin (born May 15, 1976), better known by his stage name Jakki tha Motamouth, is an American rapper from Columbus, Ohio. He is a member of MHz Legacy. He was part of the group The Weathermen. Originally released in 2004, his first solo album, God vs. Satan, was re-released in 2005. He's best known for his punchlines and excellent storytelling ability.

== Discography ==
=== Albums ===
- God vs. Satan (2005)
- Psycho Circus (2008)

=== Singles ===
- "Widespread" b/w "The Chosen" (2000)
- "I'm Trying" (2003)

=== Guest appearances ===
- RJD2 - "F.H.H." from Deadringer (2002)
- Copywrite - "Nobody" and "Theme Music" from The High Exhaulted (2002)
- Vakill - "Forbidden Scriptures" from The Darkest Cloud (2003)
- Greenhouse Effect - "You Must Learn" from Columbus or Bust (2005)
- Killah Priest - "Fire Reign" from The 3 Day Theory (2010)
- Copywrite - "Swaggot Killaz" from God Save the King (2012)
- Casual x J. Rawls - "Hier-O-Dot" from Respect Game or Expect Flames (2012)
