= God Save the King (album) =

Studio album by Copywrite
- Released: February 28, 2012
- Genre: Hip hop
- Length: 68:43
- Label: Man Bites Dog Records
- Producer: Jason Rose, Bronze Nazareth, Illmind, Stu Bangas, Khrysis, S.G. on the Traxxx, Vanderslice, RJD2, Poetiq Beetz, Marco Polo

Copywrite chronology
The Life and Times of Peter Nelson (2010)	God Save the King (2012)	Blood, Bath, and Beyond (2016)

Professional ratings
Review scores
Source	Rating
HipHopDX	4/5 stars
Potholes in My Blog	3/5 stars
XXL	XL

God Save The King is a studio album by American rapper Copywrite. It was released on Man Bites Dog Records in 2012. The title of the album derives from Sex Pistols' "God Save the Queen".

== Critical reception ==
Slava Kuperstein of HipHopDX called the album "one of this year's strongest outings thus far." He said: "Fans of honest-to-goodness emceeing will eat this one up – Copywrite is clever and knows how to cover a gamut of topics with equal parts humor and intensity." Meanwhile, Matt Wright of XXL praised "Copywrite's ability to flow seamlessly over laid-back or up-tempo tracks, spitting multis, punchlines, and wordplay along the way."

== Track listing ==
No.	Title	Producer(s)	Length
1.	"Post-Apocalyptic Request Box"	Jason Rose	2:07
2.	"Love" (featuring Tage Future)	Bronze Nazareth	3:11
3.	"Swaggot Killaz" (featuring Jakki Da Motamouth)	Illmind	4:18
4.	"Sorrow" (featuring Illogic and Don Jaga)	Stu Bangas	3:49
5.	"Man Made" (featuring Rock)	Jason Rose	3:03
6.	"J.O.Y." (featuring Jason Rose and Torae)	Jason Rose	3:58
7.	"Union Rights" (featuring MHz)	Khrysis	4:10
8.	"Yo! MTV Raps! (Money for Nothing)" (featuring Jason Rose)	Jason Rose	5:18
9.	"Blue Ribbon"	Bronze Nazareth	3:54
10.	"Miracle"	S.G. on the Traxxx	1:04
11.	"G$K"	Stu Bangas	3:58
12.	"Workahol"	Stu Bangas	4:47
13.	"White Democrats" (featuring Mac Lethal)	Jason Rose	3:12
14.	"Golden State (of Mind)" (featuring Casual, Evidence, and Roc Marciano)	Vanderslice	4:27
15.	"Synesthesia"	RJD2	2:17
16.	"Got to Make It" (featuring Tage Future)	Stu Bangas	3:27
17.	"A Talk with Jesus"	Poetiq Beetz	8:34
18.	"Opium Prodigies" (featuring Illogic)	Marco Polo
