= The 3 Day Theory =

Studio album by Killah Priest
- Released: July 27, 2010
- Studios: Man Bites Dog Studios; Foundation Five Studios
- Genre: Hip-hop
- Length: 48:24
- Label: Man Bites Dog
- Producer: Kount Fif

Killah Priest chronology
Elizabeth (2009)	The 3 Day Theory (2010)	The Psychic World of Walter Reed (2013)

Professional ratings
Review scores
Source	Rating
HipHopDX	3/5
RapReviews	8/10

The 3 Day Theory is the ninth solo studio album by American rapper Killah Priest. It was released on July 27, 2010, through Man Bites Dog Records. Recording sessions took place at Man Bites Dog Studios in Northern Virginia and at Foundation Five Studios. Entirely produced by Kount Fif, it features guest appearances from Empuls, 2Mex, Canibus, Cappadonna, Copywrite, Icon the Mic King, Ill Bill, Jakki tha Motamouth, Jay-Notes, Redd Mudd, Sabac Red, Sonny Seeza, Steven King and The Last Emperor.

== Track listing ==
No.	Title	Writer(s)	Length
1.	"Book of Life"	Walter Reed; Dustin Burdette	2:46
2.	"Shadows"	Reed; Burdette	2:02
3.	"Betrayal" (featuring Cappadonna)	Reed; Darryl Hill; Burdette	4:11
4.	"Brolic" (featuring Empuls)	Reed; Derek Summers; Burdette	3:29
5.	"A Priest History"	Reed; Burdette	3:09
6.	"Fire Reign" (featuring Copywrite and Jakki da Mota Mouth)	Reed; Peter Nelson; Jakki Rubin; Burdette	2:09
7.	"The Destroyer" (featuring Sonny Seeza, iCON The Mic King, Steven King and Empuls)	Reed; Tyrone Taylor; Michael King; Steven King; Summers; Burdette	4:39
8.	"Birds" (featuring Jay-Notes and Redd Mudd)	Reed; Jason Rose; William Brewer; Burdette	3:09
9.	"Demcocracy" (featuring Canibus)	Reed; Germaine Williams; Burdette	2:59
10.	"Outer Body Experience"	Reed; Burdette	5:12
11.	"Psalm of Satan" (featuring Sabac Red and Ill Bill)	Reed; William Braunstein; John Fuentes; Burdette	4:56
12.	"The Rose"	Reed; Shameka Brabson; Burdette	3:42
13.	"Circles" (featuring Last Emperor and 2Mex)	Reed; Jamal Gray; Alejandro Ocana; Burdette	4:06
14.	"Words from a Viking"	Reed; Burdette	1:55
Total length:			48:24

== Personnel ==
- Walter "Killah Priest" Reed – vocals
- Darryl "Cappadonna" Hill – vocals (track 3)
- Derek "Empuls" Summers Jr. – vocals (tracks: 4, 7)
- Peter "Copywrite" Nelson – vocals (track 6)
- Jakki "Da Motamouth" Rubin – vocals (track 6)
- Tyrone "Sonny Seeza" Taylor – vocals (track 7)
- Michael "Icon the Mic King" King – vocals (track 7)
- Steven King – vocals (track 7)
- Jason "Jay-Notes" Rose – vocals (track 8)
- William "Redd Mudd" Brewer – vocals (track 8)
- Germaine "Canibus" Williams – vocals (track 9)
- John "Sabac Red" Fuentes – vocals (track 11)
- William "Ill Bill" Braunstein – vocals (track 11)
- Shameka "Lyrik" Brabson – additional vocals (track 12)
- Jamal "The Last Emperor" Gray – vocals (track 13)
- Alejandro "2Mex" Ocana – vocals (track 13)
- DJ Drastic – scratches (track 8)
- Dustin "Kount Fif" Burdette – producer, recording (tracks: 1, 3–14), mixing, mastering
- Ryan M. Lynch – producer, executive producer, art direction, A&R
- Daniel Nelson – recording (track 2)
- Orign – artwork
- Chris "McNastee" McDaniel – layout
