= A Beautiful Mind (disambiguation) =

A Beautiful Mind is a 2001 biographical drama film.

A Beautiful Mind or Beautiful Mind may also refer to:

- A Beautiful Mind (book), the book of which the film is based upon
- A Beautiful Mind (soundtrack), soundtrack of the film
- A Beautiful Mind (TV series), Korean series starring Jang Hyuk and Park So-dam
- Beautiful Mind Records, a record label launched by Jon Bellion
  - Beautiful Mind, a musical group made up of Jon Bellion and his frequent collaborators
- Beautiful Mind (album), 2022, by Rod Wave
- "A Beautiful Mind" (Peep Show), a television episode

== See also ==
- Beautiful Young Minds, a documentary following a British team of mathematical competitors (on 2006 International Mathematical Olympiad)
- Beautiful Minds (disambiguation)
