= The Offering (Killah Priest album) =

Studio album by Killah Priest
- Released: August 21, 2007
- Recorded: 2006–2007
- Studio: Sotti Studio (New York, NY); Planet 2 Planet Studios (New York, NY); In The Mix Studios (Portland, OR); 720 Studios (New Jersey); Unique Studios (New York, NY)
- Genre: Hip-hop
- Length: 1:04:16
- Label: Good Hands; Traffic Entertainment
- Producer: 4th Disciple; Arythmetic; Ben Grimm; Chuckie Madness; Ciph Barker; DJ Huggy; DJ Sane 720; Jordan River Banks; Kount Fif; MOD The Black Marvel; Shakim Allah; Subliminal; Sam Sneed

Killah Priest chronology
Black August Revisited (2003)	The Offering (2007)	Behind the Stained Glass (2008)

Singles from The Offering
- 1. "Gun for Gun" Released: July 27, 2007

Professional ratings
Review scores
Source	Rating
AllMusic	4/5 stars
HipHopDX	3.5/5
RapReviews	8/10

The Offering is the fifth solo studio album by American rapper Killah Priest. It was released on August 21, 2007, through Good Hands Records with distribution via Traffic Entertainment Group. Recording sessions took place at Sotti Studios, Planet 2 Planet Studios and Unique Recording in New York, In The Mix Studios in Portland, and 720 Studios in New Jersey. Production was handled by Jordan River Banks, Ciph Barker, Shakim Allah, 4th Disciple, Arythmetic, Ben Grimm, Chuckie Madness, DJ Huggy, DJ Sane 720, Kount Fif, MOD The Black Marvel, Subliminal, and Sam Sneed. It features guest appearances from Blood Sport, Hell Razah, Immortal Technique, Nas, Z Man and the HRSMN. The album was sequenced by Stacey Castro, Priest's manager at the time, and the only manager the artist has ever had. The single was released on July 27, Stacey Castro's birthday.

Some songs reported to be featured on the album were released in advance, including the album's title track "The Offering", featuring Hell Razah. AllHipHop says: "For the most part, the production on the album, from the likes of 4th Disciple and Godz Wrath, complements Priest’s flow and lyrics very well". As previous albums, The Offering is heavy on lyrical content dealing with spirituality, freedom of the mind and religion. On the track "Salvation", Killah Priest talks about a spiritual battle with temptation.

HipHopDX gave the album a favorable rating, while the written review was highly critical to Priest's style and execution of his lyrics. Overall ending with: "Overall, The Offering is a solid album. Making a collection of 17 tracks which are listenable as a whole isn't easy, and Killah Priest more or less manages to pull it off".

== Track listing ==
No.	Title	Writer(s)	Producer(s)	Length
1.	"The Offering (Intro)"	Walter Reed; M. Harper	MOD The Black Marvel	3:03
2.	"Salvation"	W. Reed; Bradley McNaughton	Arythmetic	4:02
3.	"Gun for Gun" (featuring Nas)	W. Reed; Nasir Jones; Dustin Burdette	Kount Fif	3:22
4.	"How Many"	W. Reed	Subliminal	2:46
5.	"Uprising"	W. Reed; C. Delcarpio	Shakim Allah	2:08
6.	"Melodic Part 2" (featuring Hell Razah)	W. Reed; Jonas Leopold	Jordan River Banks	4:05
7.	"Priesthood"	W. Reed; Luis Escalante	DJ Sane 720	4:05
8.	"Inner G" (performed by 4 HRSMN)	W. Reed; John Austin; Germaine Williams; Ricardo Brown; Selwyn Bogard	4th Disciple	4:27
9.	"Ghetto Jezus"	W. Reed; Leopold	Jordan River Banks	2:45
10.	"The Offering"	W. Reed	Chuckie Madness	3:42
11.	"Truth B Told"	W. Reed; Leopold	Jordan River Banks	2:58
12.	"Osirus Eyes"	W. Reed; T. Moermans	Ciph Barker	3:12
13.	"Standstill" (featuring Blood Sport and Immortal Technique)	W. Reed; Dondi Pride; Felipe Coronel	Ciph Barker	4:14
14.	"PJS" (featuring Z Man)	W. Reed; Zariya Reed; Benjamin Vargas	Ben Grimm	3:05
15.	"Happy"	W. Reed; Delcarpio	Shakim Allah	3:44
16.	"Essential"	W. Reed; Jaron Lamot	DJ Huggy	6:43
17.	"Til Thee Angels Come (For Us)" (featuring Black Market Militia)	W. Reed; Chron Smith	Sam Sneed	5:55
Total length:				1:04:16

== Personnel ==
- Walter "Killah Priest" Reed – vocals, executive producer
- Nasir "Nas" Jones – vocals (track 3)
- Chron "Hell Razah" Smith – vocals (tracks: 6, 17)
- John "Ras Kass" Austin – vocals (track 8)
- Germaine "Canibus" Williams – vocals (track 8)
- Ricardo "Kurupt" Brown – vocals (track 8)
- Dondi "Blood Sport" Pride – vocals (track 13)
- Felipe "Immortal Technique" Coronel – vocals (track 13)
- Zariya "Z Man" Reed – vocals (track 14)
- Starry James – additional vocals (track 15)
- Ian "7th Ambassador" Bellido – vocals (track 17)
- M. R. "MOD The Black Marvel" Harper – producer (track 1)
- Bradley "Arythmetic" McNaughton – producer (track 2)
- Dustin "Kount Fif" Burdette – producer (track 3)
- Subliminal – producer (track 4)
- C. "Shakim Allah" Delcarpio – producer (tracks: 5, 15)
- Jonas "Jordan River Banks" Leopold – producer (tracks: 6, 9, 11), mixing (tracks: 9, 11)
- Luis "DJ Sane 720" Escalante – producer & recording (track 7)
- Selwyn "4th Disciple" Bogard – producer (track 8)
- Charles "Chuckie Madness" Shaw – producer (track 10)
- T. "Ciph Barker" Moermans – producer (tracks: 12, 13)
- Benjamin "Ben Grimm" Vargas – producer (track 14)
- Jaron "DJ Huggy" Lamot – producer (track 16)
- Samuel "Sam Sneed" Anderson – producer (track 17)
- Eric "Ibo" Butler – recording (tracks: 1, 6, 8, 17), mixing (tracks: 1, 3–8, 10, 12–17), additional recording (tracks: 11, 15), additional mixing (tracks: 9, 11)
- Larry Kerr – recording (tracks: 3, 5, 11–13)
- MyG – recording (track 4)
- Mario – recording (track 9)
- Jeff Yellin – recording (track 10, 14–16)
- Nick Nastasi – engineering (tracks: 3–5, 7)
- Tony Dawsey – mastering
- Amal McCaskill – executive producer
- Renold Rose – art direction, design
