= I Killed the Devil Last Night =

I Killed The Devil Last Night

Mixtape by Killah Priest
- Released: March 7, 2009
- Genre: Hip hop
- Length: 80:44
- Label: Proverbs Records

Killah Priest chronology
Behind the Stained Glass (2008)	I Killed The Devil Last Night (2009)	The Exorcist (2009)

Professional ratings
Review scores
Source	Rating
RapReviews	6.5/10 stars

I Killed The Devil Last Night is a mixtape by rapper Killah Priest, released on March 7, 2009, through Proverbs Records. It features only a few guest appearances, such as 60 Second Assassin, who appeared in Killah Priest's album Behind the Stained Glass. Other notable appearances include Stat Quo, Hussein Fatal, DoItAll and Mr. probz. The mixtape was released as a free download exclusively on BallerStatus.com.

== Track listing ==
#	Title	Length	Performer(s)
1	"I Killed The Devil Last Night"	3:41	Killah Priest
2	"The Book"	4:38	Killah Priest
3	"The Escape - The Devil's Sidemen"	4:07	Killah Priest
4	"The Long Ride"	2:14	Killah Priest
5	"Power of Freestyle"	2:25	Killah Priest
6	"Power of Freestyle Part. 2"	2:26	Killah Priest
7	"The Devil's Meeting (Take My Drunkass Home)"	3:03	Killah Priest
8	"The Color of Murder"	4:28	Killah Priest
9	"The Devil's Eulogy"	3:12	Killah Priest
10	"Priest Style"	3:28	Killah Priest
11	"Forever Regime"	3:30	Killah Priest (feat. 60 Second Assassin & Vendetta Kingz)
12	"Freestyle"	2:14	Starkim
13	"How We Met"	0:43	Killah Priest
14	"Valley of Bones"	1:50	Killah Priest
15	"Go Hard"	2:18	Killah Priest
16	"Daughter"	2:20	Killah Priest
17	"No Holding Back"	3:31	Killah Priest
18	"Puff A Cloud"	3:27	Killah Priest
19	"The Edge of the Night"	3:31	Killah Priest (feat. Purpose)
20	"Black Jesuz"	3:14	Killah Priest
21	"Amazing Freestyle"	2:19	Killah Priest
22	"Vampire Lord Aka. Castle Hop"	2:27	Killah Priest
23	"The P.W.O.W.R Freestyle Part. 3"	5:13	Killah Priest
24	"Gather Around"	0:49	Killah Priest
25	"The Devil's Funeral"	3:14	Killah Priest
26	"Where I Come From (Remix)"	7:16	The Advocate (feat. Willy Northpole, Killah Priest, Stat Quo, DoItAll, Big Lou, Hussein Fatal, Sha Stimuli & Mr. probz)
27	"Outro"	0:20	Killah Priest
