= Rip the Jacker =

Studio album by Canibus
- Released: July 22, 2003
- Recorded: 2003
- Genre: Hip-hop
- Length: 44:56
- Labels: Mic Club, Babygrande
- Producer: Stoupe the Enemy of Mankind

Canibus chronology
Mic Club: The Curriculum (2002)	Rip the Jacker (2003)	Mind Control (2005)

Singles from Rip the Jacker
- 1. "Spartibus" Released: June 24, 2003; 2. "Indibisible" Released: December 2003

Rip the Jacker is the fifth studio album by American rapper Canibus. Produced by Stoupe the Enemy of Mankind of the group Jedi Mind Tricks, the album was released on July 22, 2003, through Babygrande Records.

After the release of Canibus' album Mic Club: The Curriculum (2002), Babygrande CEO Chuck Wilson had Stoupe work on production for a follow-up to Mic Club. Canibus had recorded his lyrics to send to Stoupe before joining the United States Army and did not hear the final product until he bought a copy of the album. Taking its title from the character in the Mic Club track "Bis vs. Rip", Canibus characterizes Rip the Jacker as a concept album that sees the world through the eyes of a modern-day lyricist and poet. The album garnered acclaim from critics who praised the combination of Canibus' sharp lyricism with Stoupe's intricate production. Rip the Jacker reached number 194 on the Billboard 200, his first time on that chart since 2000 B.C. (2000). It also reached numbers 11 and 34 on the Independent Albums and Top R&B/Hip-Hop Albums charts respectively.

== Conception ==
After producer Stoupe the Enemy of Mankind of the group Jedi Mind Tricks produced the track "Liberal Arts" from Canibus' fourth album Mic Club: The Curriculum (2002), Babygrande Records CEO Chuck Wilson raised the possibility of Stoupe producing an album. Before enlisting in the United States Army, Canibus recorded his vocals before any production and then sent the a cappellas to Stoupe. Canibus claimed that he wrote the lyrics on a "stained dinner table in Hell's Kitchen". In 2003, he stated that the album consisted of his most complex rhymes to date and it "describes our civilization through the eyes of a modern day lyricist/poet". Due to his military obligations, he did not hear the songs in the final format until a week after the album's release when he purchased a copy at Best Buy. Although he released future albums, Rip the Jacker was intended to be his last. As a concept album, the record represents the third "personality" of the rapper: "Prof. Emeritus Rip The Jacker", the others being "Dr. PhD Canibus" and "Germaine Williams" (his real name). Canibus explained the alter-egos:

Germaine created Canibus and Canibus had to deal with things in the industry that he had no idea existed. I didn't know that the competition was unfair, that the competitive nature of the music was cut-throat. Then when I had the chance to experience that, Canibus had to create another level. Rip the Jacker is like a foot side of Jack the Ripper".

== Music and reception ==
Professional ratings
Review scores
Source	Rating
AllHipHop	4/5 stars
AllMusic	3/5 stars
The A.V. Club	Favorable
Entertainment Weekly	Ambivalent
HipHopDX	4/5 stars
MV Remix	8.5/10
RapReviews	10/10
The Situation	4/5
Stylus Magazine	(B+)
Yahoo! Music	Favorable

Produced by Stoupe the Enemy of Mankind, the album frequently samples golden age hip-hop tracks. Canibus is characterized for his "deep vocabulary, scientific concepts, battle rhymes and descriptive imagery" throughout the album. Stylus Magazine's Kilian Murphy wrote that:

The entire English language is seemingly contained in [Canibus'] mind: the sheer volume and variety on each track is astounding. He has word after word lined up in his head, bursting to be articulated. So he deletes and re-arranges until they are moulded into a savage, scholarly verbal assault ... He consistently spits rhymes out with manic fury, but rarely alters the texture of his voice, takes care to emphasize individual words or alter pronunciations for effect.

The album received favorable reviews from music critics. AllMusic's Andy Kellman considered the album to have the "best set of productions Canibus has had to work with". C. Brown of AllHipHop wrote that Canibus provides "incredibly sharp lyricism" and "has adopted a more technical approach to his rhyming since the 1990s." HipHopDX called Rip the Jacker Canibus' best album and praised the "lyrical dexterity" which can be "matched by very few". Entertainment Weekly's Jonah Weiner described the rhymes as "high-flown and delivered with gruff scorn -- but inane". URB magazine writer Steve Juon of RapReviews.com ranked it the best album of 2003 and said it may be Canibus' "first album of perfection". Kilian Murphy of Stylus Magazine praised the record for its "pleasing level of instrumental detail and liquidity". Nathan Rabin of The A.V. Club wrote that Canibus "sounds like a kid who spends his free time reading the dictionary" and that the album was his "strongest, most consistent work to date. A shameless name-dropper, he references Noam Chomsky, Joseph Heller, Niels Bohr, and David Hume in his dense, challenging rhymes". Samuel Chesneau of The Stranger called it "easily his best album" which "incorporates a much different sound and a real gothic feel".

== Track listing ==
All songs written by Canibus and produced by Stoupe the Enemy of Mankind.

#	Title	Samples	Time
1	"Intro"	In Search of... episode "Jack the Ripper"	0:33
2	"Genabis"	"Music Box" by Philip Glass; "The Demise of Candyman" by Philip Glass; "Reverend's Walk" by Philip Glass	4:12
3	"Levitibus"	The Outer Limits episode "The Borderland"; "Querer" by Cirque du Soleil; "Exertions" (remix) by Jedi Mind Tricks	4:00
4	"M-Sea-Cresy"	"A Sombra (Fado Nocturno)" by António Chainho; "You Gots to Chill" by EPMD; "My Philosophy" by Boogie Down Productions; "Forget Me Knots" by Heltah Skeltah; "How Many MC's..." by Black Moon; "Internationally known" by D.I.T.C.	3:50
5	"No Return"	"Adon Olam" by David Gould	4:53
6	"Spartibus"	"Σαμπάχ Με Μπαγλαμά" by Βαγγέλης Κορακάκης; "My Melody" by Eric B. & Rakim	4:00
7	"Indibisible"	"Le Monde Est Fou" by Balla Tounkara; "The Pink Room" by Angelo Badalamenti	3:59
8	"Showtime at the Gallow"	"Sabroso Como El Guarapo" by Pupi Legarreta; "Symphony 2000" by EPMD	4:41
9	"Psych Evaluation"	The Twilight Zone episode "Where Is Everybody?"; "Nowhere to Hide" by Henning Lohner; "Numb" by Portishead; "Wandering Star" by Portishead; "Right Back at You" by Mobb Deep; "Temporary Insanity" by Psycho Realm; "No Alibi" by The Roots; "Clones" by The Roots	3:51
10	"Cemantics"	"Fate's Lieutenant" by Christopher Gordon; "Daytona 500" by Ghostface Killah; "Leather Face" by Big Pun; "Cold as Ice" by M.O.P.; "Take It Personal" by Gang Starr; "Assassination Day" by Ghostface Killah	3:40
11	"Poet Laureate II"	"Nine Sisters" by Kenji Kawai; "Mr. Grammarticalogylisationalism Is the Boss" by Fela Kuti	7:18

== Singles ==
Single information
"Spartibus"
- Released: June 24, 2003
"Indibisible"
- Released: December 2003
- B-side: "No Return"

== Charts ==
Chart (2003)	Peak position
US Billboard 200	194
US Independent Albums (Billboard)	11
US Top R&B/Hip-Hop Albums (Billboard)	34

== Personnel ==
Information taken from AllMusic.

- Executive producer – Louis Lombard III, Chuck Wilson
- Design – Jeff Chenault
- Mixing – Chris Conway
- Photography – Stephen Mitchell Gilbert
- Production coordination – Charles "Chase" Jones
- Mastering – Emily Lazar, Sarah Register
- Art direction – Luminati
- Marketing – Jesse Stone
- Vocal engineer – Todd Watson
