= Beautiful Minds (album) =

Studio album by Killah Priest and Chief Kamachi
- Released: September 23, 2008
- Recorded: 2007–2008
- Genre: Hip hop
- Label: Traffic Entertainment/Good Hands Records

Chief Kamachi chronology
Concrete Gospel (2005)	Beautiful Minds (2008)	The Clock of Destiny (2010)

Killah Priest chronology
Behind the Stained Glass (2008)	Beautiful Minds (2008)	The Exorcist (2009)

Beautiful Minds is the first collaborative album from rappers Killah Priest and Chief Kamachi.

== Track listing ==
#	Title	Performer(s)	Producer(s)
1	"Beautiful Minds"	Killah Priest & Chief Kamachi	Emonex
2	"All Hail"	Killah Priest & Chief Kamachi	Diamond Legit
3	"Closest"	Killah Priest & Chief Kamachi	Diamond Legit
4	"Reflections"	Killah Priest & Chief Kamachi	Danny Diggs
5	"Illest"	Killah Priest & Chief Kamachi (feat. Planet Asia)	C Sik (DJ Rhettmatic - Scratches)
6	"Most High"	Killah Priest & Chief Kamachi	Tekneek
7	"Time Out Revisited"	Killah Priest & Chief Kamachi	Dev Rocka
8	"Don't Waste Your Lungs"	Chief Kamachi	Tekneek
9	"All Been Buried"	Killah Priest & Chief Kamachi	E. Dan
10	"Blessing"	Killah Priest & Chief Kamachi	Tekneek
11	"See Clearly"	Killah Priest	DJ Woool
12	"Scrolls"	Killah Priest & Chief Kamachi	C Sik (DJ Rhettmatic - Scratches)
