= C! True Hollywood Stories =

Studio album by Canibus
- Released: October 30, 2001
- Recorded: 2001
- Genre: Hip-hop
- Length: 64:08
- Label: Archives Music
- Producers: All City, Alywad, C4, Canibus, Chips, Diverse, Eben, Louis Lombard III, Pakman, Slice O Life

Canibus chronology
2000 B.C. (Before Can-I-Bus) (2000)	C! True Hollywood Stories (2001)	Mic Club: The Curriculum (2002)

C! True Hollywood Stories is the third studio album by American rapper Canibus, released through Archives Music on October 30, 2001. The album is Canibus' first release on an independent record label (his first two albums, Can-I-Bus and 2000 B.C., were released on Universal Records). The album was named after the television show E! True Hollywood Story. This album sets itself apart from his first two albums by seemingly being a concept album, some songs rapped from the perspective of Stan, the fan from the Eminem song "Stan". It can also be noted Canibus' rhyme style and flow resemble more that of Eminem than the style presented on his first two albums, which led to mixed reviews from the public.

== Critical reception ==
Professional ratings
Review scores
Source	Rating
AllMusic	2.5/5 stars
HipHopDX	3.5/5 stars
RapReviews	4.5/10
Stylus Magazine	F

C! True Hollywood Stories garnered mixed reviews from music critics. Wise Q of HipHopDX said that despite the album's lack of engaging topics and powerful beats, he gave credit to tracks like "Hate U 2/Luv U 2", "I Gotta Story 2 Tell" and "The Rip Off" for finding that right merger of ingredients, concluding that "Lyrically, he is still the top of the field and, with the right feedback and right amount of work, Canibus will be able to receive the respect he deserves." Brad Mills of AllMusic was ambivalent towards the album, admiring the chill vibe used throughout but found the video games beats not working half the time with Canibus' battle flow, concluding that "If you're a die-hard fan, don't expect the MC murderer listeners have grown used to, but don't completely write it off either. An introspective effort." Steve 'Flash' Juon of RapReviews saw potential in the album's concept but felt it was undone by poor production choices, lackluster humor and failure to commit to parodying the show following lyrical standouts like "R U Lyrically Fit?" and "Box Cutta' Blade Runna", saying that "Canibus sounds like their musical equivalent - showing flashes of the greatness that made him famous but drowning in a river of bad ideas poorly executed over lackluster beats." Brett Berliner of Stylus Magazine heavily panned the album for its middling beats, sub-standard lyrics and complete desecration of Eminem's "Stan" character.

== Track listing ==
No.	Title	Producer(s)	Length
1.	"Introduction"	K. Karlsson	1:30
2.	"Stan Lives!" (skit)	Stan	1:26
3.	"U Didn't Care"	Nir Even	4:29
4.	"The Rip Off"	Chips, Slice O Life	4:23
5.	"C True Hollywood Stories"	Nir Even	4:03
6.	"A Different Vibe in L.A."	Archives	3:50
7.	"I Gotta Story 2 Tell"	Eben	2:24
8.	"Stan 'n Can" (skit)	Stanibus	1:57
9.	"Hate U 2" (featuring Pakman)	Krystal Clear, Fokis	3:32
10.	"Stop Smokin'"	Chips, Slice O Life	3:11
11.	"Lemmie Hear Sumthin' Else" (featuring Pakman)	Nir Even	3:50
12.	"Hott Tonight"	Alywad, All City	4:37
13.	"Gotta Get That Doe!" (featuring Pakman)	Alywad, All City	4:07
14.	"R U Lyrically Fit?" (featuring Luminati)	Nir Even	3:16
15.	"Ya Teef Iz Yellow" (skit)	Pakman, RTJ	1:29
16.	"Luv U 2"	Fokis	4:00
17.	"Box Cutta' Blade Runna"	Eben	2:36
18.	"Draft Me!" (featuring C-4)	Louis Lombard	4:32
19.	"One of My Favorites" (skit)	Archives Publishing	1:41
20.	"C.T.H.S." (Outro)	Diverse, All City	1:54
21.	"Bonus Track"	Archives Music	1:20

== Charts ==
Chart (2001)	Peak position
US Independent Albums (Billboard)	22
US Top R&B/Hip-Hop Albums (Billboard)	71
