= The Psychic World of Walter Reed =

Studio album by Killah Priest
- Released: February 25, 2013
- Recorded: 2009–2012
- Genre: Hip hop
- Length: 68:37 (CD #1); 68:14 (CD #2)
- Label: Proverbs Records
- Producer: Killah Priest, St. Peter, Jordan River Banks, Kalisto, Purpose, Ciph Barker, Ayatollah, Agallah The Don, RZA, True Master, GZA, Shaolin Monks, Beat Butcha, Mercilles, 4th Disciple, Godz Wrath, M.O.D. The Black Marvel

Killah Priest chronology
The 3 Day Theory (2010)	The Psychic World of Walter Reed (2013)	Planet of the Gods (2015)

Professional ratings
Review scores
Source	Rating
RapReviews	6.5/10

The Psychic World of Walter Reed is the tenth studio album by American rapper Killah Priest. It was released on February 25, 2013. The album features guest appearances from Ghostface Killah, Inspectah Deck, George Clinton, Lord Fury, Raekwon and Alita Dupray. With production coming from Godz Wrath, Ayatollah, RZA, True Master, GZA and 4th Disciple.

== Track listing ==
Disc 1
No.	Title	Producer(s)	Length
1.	"The Opening"	St. Peter	2:17
2.	"Shadow Landz"	Jordan River Banks	3:37
3.	"New Reality"	Jordan River Banks	3:41
4.	"Street Thesis"	Kalisto	3:57
5.	"Ein Sof (Paradise)"	Jordan River Banks	3:35
6.	"Developing Story"	Kalisto	2:57
7.	"Brilliantaire"	St. Peter	3:00
8.	"The Park"	Kalisto	3:38
9.	"Devotion to the Saints" (featuring Ghostface Killah and Inspectah Deck)	Kalisto	3:44
10.	"Visionz"	Purpose	3:00
11.	"The Winged People"	St. Peter	2:54
12.	"Peace God"	Ciph Barker	5:08
13.	"The Spell"	Ciph Barker	3:43
14.	"Super God"	Ayatollah	2:42
15.	"Salute"	Kalisto	2:27
16.	"They Say"	Kalisto	4:14
17.	"The Elders Gave Us Aura"	Agallah The Don	1:38
18.	"The Seer, The Poet"	Jordan River Banks	4:08
19.	"Currents of Events"	Ciph Barker	4:10
20.	"Energy Work"	RZA	4:06

Disc 2
No.	Title	Producer(s)	Length
1.	"The Pwowr (Problem Solver)"	True Master, GZA, Shaolin Monks	5:02
2.	"The Black Market"	Ciph Barker, Beat Butcha	3:35
3.	"L Theanine"	Purpose	2:44
4.	"Tonite We Ride" (featuring George Clinton)	Jordan River Banks	3:05
5.	"Tower (The Visitor)"	St. Peter	2:43
6.	"Fortune Teller"	St. Peter	3:09
7.	"Think Priest (Good Thoughts)"	Jordan River Banks	3:47
8.	"Golden Calf"	Ciph Barker	3:40
9.	"Fire Stone"	RZA	2:31
10.	"Mentalude (Just My Thoughts)"	Killah Priest, GZA	1:43
11.	"Lord Marduk" (featuring Lord Fury)	Mercilles	4:29
12.	"Music of the Spheres"	Jordan River Banks	3:29
13.	"Anakim Dreams"	4th Disciple	2:10
14.	"How I Write"	Ciph Barker	3:48
15.	"Wubian Nation" (featuring Raekwon)	Federico Cisik Lopez	2:39
16.	"The Document"	Godz Wrath	3:38
17.	"Listen to Me"	Kalisto	4:06
18.	"Lotus Flower"	St. Peter	4:04
19.	"The Question"	Killah Priest	1:19
20.	"Love Is Life" (featuring Alita Dupray)	M.O.D. The Black Marvel	3:48
21.	"Nazareth"	Jordan River Banks	2:45
