= Mic Club: The Curriculum =

Studio album by Canibus
- Released: November 19, 2002
- Recorded: 2002
- Genre: Hip-hop
- Length: 54:33
- Label: Mic Club
- Producers: Canibus (exec.); Louis Lombard III (exec.); PlusScience; Kyros; DJ Kemo; DJ Serious; Luminati; Stoupe the Enemy of Mankind

Canibus chronology
| C! True Hollywood Stories (2001) | Mic Club: The Curriculum (2002) | Rip the Jacker (2003) |

Mic Club: The Curriculum is the fourth studio album by American rapper Canibus, released on November 19, 2002 through Canibus' own label, Mic Club Music. It is generally recognized for its scholarly vocabulary and complex lyrics. Much of the production is handled by relatively unknown producers, though the album has been praised overall for its lyrics and beats. It contains over 1,000 bars combined throughout the thirteen tracks, with only three choruses in "Behind Enemy Rhymes", "'C' Section", and "Liberal Arts".

A limited number of autographed albums were sold exclusively through Micclub.net when it premiered. There was also a rare random insert which could be redeemed for an autographed microphone by Canibus.

== Critical reception ==
Professional ratings
Review scores
| Source | Rating |
|---|---|
| AllHipHop | 4.5/5 stars |
| AllMusic | 3/5 stars |
| HipHopDX | 3.5/5 stars |
| HipHop-Elements | Favorable |
| RapReviews | 8/10 |
| The Situation | 4/5 |
| Stylus Magazine | B− |

Mic Club: The Curriculum received generally positive reviews from music critics, calling it a vast improvement over C! True Hollywood Stories because of more focus being put into the battle raps and production.

Steve 'Flash' Juon of RapReviews praised the album for the production handled by PlusScience and Kyros and Canibus for crafting tracks that feel cohesive and mesh well, saying that "'Bis got back to the form he once displayed on the 'Music Makes Me High (Remix)' and spits the best raps we've heard from him since 2000 B.C." Melisa Tang of The Situation also praised the tracks for having great production and lyricism, singling out "Master Thesis" and "Curriculum 101" as the lyrical standouts, saying that, "Mic Club is definitely the best LP Canibus has released to date, and is a close contender for the 'Best Rap Album of the Decade' award, (seriously)." Boogie of AllHipHop called the album "a true sequel to 2000 B.C", praising its stripped down aesthetic and unconventional song structure to showcase Canibus' vocabulary and intense lyricism, saying that he "rebounded from the critical backlash he has received and dropped one of the finest albums of 2002."

AllMusic's Jason Birchmeier praised Canibus for putting more emphasis on his scholar personality in his rhymes, saying that he "offers a refreshing alternative to his bestial hardcore peers as well as his boringly behaved scholarly ones and presents himself as a proud, true anomaly". Brett Berliner of Stylus Magazine, while finding the battle raps nondescript at times without any new concept, still praised them for exuding raw energy along with the production, saying that "While not a classic, MiClub is closer to the heights attained on 2000 B.C. and help to regain some of the credibility that Canibus lost with the dismal C! True Hollywood Stories." J-23 of HipHopDX observed that Canibus' lyrical content can sound mind-boggling and pretentious at times but still praised him for being able to spit complex material with beats that match his style, concluding that its "still a step in the right direction [for Canibus], it is a focused effort with production that is par for the course."

== Track listing ==
| No. | Title | Producer(s) | Length |
|---|---|---|---|
| 1. | "Mic Club Intro" | PlusScience | 1:11 |
| 2. | "Poet Laureate" | DJ Kemo | 4:58 |
| 3. | "Master Thesis" | Kyros | 3:48 |
| 4. | "Behind Enemy Rhymes" | PlusScience | 4:05 |
| 5. | "Allied Meta-Forces" (featuring Kool G Rap) | DJ Serious | 5:33 |
| 6. | "Cenior Studies 02" | Kyros | 5:02 |
| 7. | "'C' Section" | PlusScience | 3:19 |
| 8. | "Drama A/T" (featuring Luminati) | Kyros | 5:51 |
| 9. | "Dr. C. Ph.D" | Kyros | 3:15 |
| 10. | "Bis vs. Rip" (featuring Rip the Jacker) | PlusScience | 6:07 |
| 11. | "Liberal Arts" (featuring Jedi Mind Tricks) | Stoupe the Enemy of Mankind | 4:25 |
| 12. | "Curriculum 101" | Kyros | 4:44 |
| 13. | "Mic Club Outro" | PlusScience | 2:14 |

== Personnel ==
Credits for Mic Club: The Curriculum adapted from AllMusic.

- Chris Conway - mixing
- Blake Franklin - design
- Emily Lazar - mastering
- Louis Lombard III - art direction
- Shirley Petchprapra - photography
- Sarah Register - mastering
- Todd Watson - engineer
- Carlisle Young - mixing

== Charts ==
| Chart (2002) | Peak position |
|---|---|
| US Independent Albums (Billboard) | 22 |
| US Top R&B/Hip-Hop Albums (Billboard) | 71 |
