= Planet of the Gods =

Studio album by Killah Priest
- Released: June 4, 2015
- Recorded: 2013–2015
- Genre: Hip hop
- Length: 70:01
- Label: Proverbs Records
- Producer: Godz Wrath

Killah Priest chronology
| The Psychic World of Walter Reed (2013) | Planet of the Gods (2015) |

Planet of the Gods is the eleventh studio album by American rapper Killah Priest. It was released on June 4, 2015 on Proverbs Records. The album was entirely produced by Dutch production team Godz Wrath and has no guest appearances.

== Track list ==
| No. | Title | Producer(s) | Length |
|---|---|---|---|
| 1. | "Intro" | Godz Wrath | 1:26 |
| 2. | "Citrin" | Black Marvel and Jordan River Banks | 3:40 |
| 3. | "Gods of E.din" | Ciph Barker | 3:13 |
| 4. | "Golden Pineapple of the Sun" | Jordan River Banks, Kombo (co-prod) | 3:22 |
| 5. | "Starship Planet (Shi'ur Qomah)" | Ciph Barker | 2:58 |
| 6. | "Creation of a Super God" | Black Marvel | 3:30 |
| 7. | "The Vast Bottomless Sleep (Cosmos)" | Jordan River Banks | 2:20 |
| 8. | "PWOWR Glove" | Ciph Barker | 3:51 |
| 9. | "L.Gigi (People of the Land of Nod)" | Jordan River Banks and Kombo | 3:34 |
| 10. | "Earth to Walter Reed, Come In Please" | Jordan River Banks | 2:43 |
| 11. | "Mul.Apin Tablets" | Ciph Barker | 3:33 |
| 12. | "Centrality of Our Mythic Imagination" | Jordan River Banks | 3:14 |
| 13. | "Rogue Godz" | Black Marvel | 2:32 |
| 14. | "Color of Ideas" | Jordan River Banks | 3:35 |
| 15. | "Quantum Spirit of Creation" | Jordan River Banks | 4:38 |
| 16. | "Alien Stars" | Ciph Barker | 4:19 |
| 17. | "I Destroyed You In Front Of Your Leaders" | Black Marvel | 3:48 |
| 18. | "Body of Light" | Jordan River Banks | 3:36 |
| 19. | "Gallery of the Gods" | Black Marvel | 5:00 |

Bonus tracks
| No. | Title | Producer(s) | Length |
|---|---|---|---|
| 20. | "Walt's Day Out" | Jordan River Banks, Def Buurmen, Kombo and Basrabas (co-prod) | 4:57 |

Album cover artwork done by:

Jason Cardona /Orign at Futprnts Workshop 2015
