= Black August Revisited =

Studio album by Killah Priest
- Released: 2003
- Genre: Rap
- Length: 60:36
- Label: Think Differently Music
- Producer: 4th Disciple; Francis; Full Moon (Arash); G 13; Jahson; Javon; John Shapiro; Just Blaze; Kallisto; Killah Priest; Mr Khaliyl; Tiny

Killah Priest chronology
Black August (2003)	Black August Revisited (2003)	The Offering (2007)

Black August Revisited is a digital album by rapper Killah Priest. The album was re-released in 2008 with full artwork. Originally it was an Internet-only release in a slimline jewel case.

It was rated an 8.5 out of 10 by RapReviews.

== Track listing ==
#	Title	Producer(s)	Performer(s)
1	"Intro"	Kallisto	Killah Priest, Rudy
2	"Big World"	Javon	Killah Priest
3	"Greatest Lesson"	Jahson	Killah Priest
4	"The Last Supper"	Just Blaze	Killah Priest
5	"Time"	G 13	Killah Priest, Dreddy Kruger, Savoy
6	"Revisited"	Francis	Killah Priest
7	"Movie"	Jahson	Killah Priest
8	"Mind As A Weapon"	4th Disciple	Killah Priest, Hell Razah
9	"Street Opera"	4th Disciple	Killah Priest, Hell Razah
10	"Do The Damn Thing (Remix)"	Mr Khaliyl	Killah Priest, Ol' Dirty Bastard
11	"Turn Around"	Full Moon	Killah Priest
12	"Vengeance"	Jahson	Killah Priest, Ras Kass
13	"Militant"	John Shapiro	Killah Priest, Kurupt
14	"The Rain"	Tiny	Killah Priest, Main Flow
15	"People"	Kallisto	Killah Priest
16	"Genesis"	Killah Priest	Killah Priest
