= Behind the Stained Glass =

Studio album by Killah Priest
- Released: May 20, 2008
- Recorded: 2007–2008
- Genre: Hip hop
- Label: Good Hands Records/ Proverb Records
- Producer: DJ Woool, Godz Wrath, Kount Fif

Killah Priest chronology
The Offering (2007)	Behind the Stained Glass (2008)	I Killed The Devil Last Night (2009)

Professional ratings
Review scores
Source	Rating
HipHopDX	2.5/5 stars
Okayplayer	(85/100)
RapReviews	6.5/10 stars

Behind the Stained Glass is the sixth studio album by rapper Killah Priest, released on May 20, 2008, through Good Hands Records. The album is the follow-up to Priest's 2007 release The Offering, and includes leftovers not featured on that album, such as "Things We Shared," which was featured on the mixtape A Prelude to The Offering.

The album features only a few guest appearances, the most notable coming from Priest's fellow Sunz of Man member 60 Second Assassin. The album's first music video, "4 Tomorrow," was released online on May 12.

== Track list ==
1. "I Believe"
2. "4 Tomorrow"
3. "A Crying Heart"
4. "Hood Nursery"
5. "Redemption" (featuring Jeni Fujita)
6. "Profits of Man" (featuring 60 Second Assassin)
7. "The World"
8. "Vintage (Things We Shared)"
9. "Looking Glass" (featuring Allah Sun)
10. "I Am"
11. "The Beloved (The Messenger)"
12. "Jeshurun" (featuring Victorious)
13. "God's Time"
14. "Born 2 Die" (featuring Victorious)
15. "O Emmanuel (Zoom)" (featuring Jeni Fujita)
16. "The End Is Coming"
