= Black August (album) =

Studio album by Killah Priest
- Released: July 8, 2003
- Recorded: 2002–2003
- Genre: Hip hop
- Label: Recon Records
- Producer: Anton Kallisto, Godie, Mr. Khaliyl, G 13, Anton Kallisto, Prose' Ipso, UC, Steely & Clevie, Sticky Dan

Killah Priest chronology
Priesthood (2001)	Black August (2003)	Black August Revisited (2003)

Black August is the fourth studio album by Wu-Tang Clan affiliated rapper Killah Priest. The album comes in two possible track lists.

== Track listing ==
This is the track listing according to Killah Priest's official site.

1. "Black August (Daylight)"
2. "Excalibur"
3. "When I'm Writing"
4. "Do the Damn Thing"
5. "Time"
6. "Robbery" (featuring Savoy)
7. "Come with Me"
8. "Breathe"
9. "Musifixtion"
10. "Deja Vu"
11. "Goodbye" (featuring Solstice)
12. "Black August (Dark)"
13. "Robbery (Remix)" (featuring Elephant Man)
14. "Do You Want It" (featuring Crystal Graves)

== Track listing ==
This is the track listing on distributed CDs via Amazon and CDUniverse.

1. "Intro"
2. "Black August"
3. "Excalibur"
4. "When I'm Writing"
5. "Time"
6. "Robbery"
7. "Come with Me"
8. "Musifixtion"
9. "Big World"
10. "The Rain" (featuring Main Flow)
11. "Deja Vu"
12. "Rush"
13. "Goodbye" (featuring Solstice)
14. "Do You Want It" (Bonus Track)
15. "Breathe (Remix)" (Bonus Track)
