= Good Hands Records =

Good Hands Records is an independent hip hop record label founded in 2002 by DJ Truth a.k.a. Charley Greenberg and Art Beeswax a.k.a. Larry Maley. In 2006, Good Hands secured a distribution deal with Traffic Entertainment Group and released Camp Lo's "Black Hollywood", Kurupt Presents Tangled Thoughts, "Philly 2 Cali", Killah Priest's "The Offering", Charon Don and DJ Huggy's (Hands Down), "Art of Life", and Dev Rocka's "The Night Shift" in 2007.

In 2008, Good Hands re-signed Wu Tang affiliate Killah Priest, and released the follow-up to "The Offering", "Behind The Stained Glass." Good Hands also released "Operation: Take Back Hip Hop" from Juice Crew legends Craig G & Marley Marl, as well as the Killah Priest & Chief Kamachi collaboration album "Beautiful Minds."

In September 2008, Good Hands announced a joint venture with artist Lil Scrappy's new label G'$ Up Records. Lil Scrappy & G'$ Up "Silence and Secrecy: Black Rag Gang" was released on February 24, 2009.

Good Hands earlier releases, via a joint venture with Eastern Conference Records, include Chief Kamachi's "Cult Status", Chief Kamachi and the Juju Mob's "Black Candles", and Reef The Lost Cauze's "Feast or Famine."
