= For Whom the Beat Tolls =

Studio album by Canibus
- Released: June 12, 2007
- Recorded: ATM Studios, North Hollywood; 2006–07
- Genre: Hip-hop
- Length: 69:35
- Label: Mic Club
- Producers: Brisk Fingaz, J. Wells, MoSS, PlusScience, R. Dizzy, Scram Jones, Shuko, Zinndeadly

Canibus chronology
Hip-Hop for Sale (2005)	For Whom the Beat Tolls (2007)	Melatonin Magik (2010)

For Whom the Beat Tolls (a play on the Ernest Hemingway novel For Whom the Bell Tolls, which itself is drawn from "Meditation XVII" of Devotions upon Emergent Occasions, a series of essays by metaphysical poet John Donne) is the eighth studio album by American rapper Canibus, released through Mic Club Music on May 29, 2007 in the United States and June 5 worldwide. It features the new "Poet Laureate Infinity" concept, which involves mixing 200 bar layers with corresponding ones in order to create various subject matter, rhymes and overall sound. The album leaked on the Internet on June 4, 2007. According to Canibus' DJ, Puerto Roc, the album has sold 60,000 copies as of October 2007.

== Reception ==
Professional ratings
Review scores
Source	Rating
HHNLive	4/5 stars
HipHopDX	2.5/5 stars
RapReviews	8.5/10

For Whom The Beat Tolls received generally positive reviews from critics.

Steve Juon of RapReviews.com called it "the latest and greatest Canibus album", noting how "from the eerie Indian backdrop of 'The Fusion Centre' to the futuristic booming beats of 'The Goetia' to the epic musical groove of 'Secrets Among Cosmonauts' Canibus keeps doing what he does best over and over again: spitting raw energy in his raps over stellar tracks."

Playda's Reviews gave the album 8.5 out of 10, saying "Canibus sounds more focused than ever, bringing much-needed lyrical heat to a year lacking just that" and calling For Whom The Beat Tolls "easily one of the best albums of 2007 so far(not to mention being Canibus' best effort since Rip the Jacker, if it wasn't obvious enough) and definitely worth your money."

== Track listing ==
No.	Title	Producer(s)	Length
1.	"For Whom the Beat Tolls"	Scram Jones	2:10
2.	"Harbinger of Light"	Brisk Fingaz	3:21
3.	"Poetaster Laureate Infinity v003"	Shuko	11:05
4.	"Liquid Wordz" (featuring Killah Priest and Sun)	MoSS	4:21
5.	"Father Author, Poor Pauper"	PlusScience	3:25
6.	"Dreamzzzzz"	PlusScience	4:53
7.	"Magnum Innominandum"	R. Dizzy	2:59
8.	"Layered Prayers"	Brisk Fingaz	2:31
9.	"The Fusion Centre" (featuring Vinnie Paz)	R. Dizzy	2:24
10.	"702-386-5397"	J. Wells	4:03
11.	"The Goetia"	Zinndeadly	3:06
12.	"Secrets Amongst Cosmonauts"	Brisk Fingaz	4:27
13.	"One Ought Not to Think"	Brisk Fingaz	2:20
14.	"Javelin Fangz"	J. Wells	4:12
15.	"There Has He Been" (featuring K-Solo)	PlusScience	2:45
16.	"Poet Laureate Infinity v004"	Shuko	11:33

== Personnel ==
Information taken from the album's liner notes.

- Executive producers – Louis Lombard III, K-Solo, Paul Holyfield
- Engineers – Victor Flores
- Mixers – 'Pistol' Pete Heinz
- Mastered by David Scharf/In Fidelity
- Canibus photography – Susan von Detten
- Art direction – Louis Lombard III
- Graphic design and image compositing – AN.X Agency
- All other photography – Moonmeister, Travelling-Light, Kirschbam, Albo, Mamay, Piccaya, Onefivenine, Ebe, Echophoto, DWPhotos
- A&R – Scott Free
