= View from Masada =

Studio album by Killah Priest
- Released: May 9, 2000
- Recorded: 1999–2000
- Genre: Hip hop
- Label: MCA
- Producer: Just Blaze, Arabian Knight, Daddy Rose, LZA, Wiz, Buddah & Shamello

Killah Priest chronology
Heavy Mental (1998)	View from Masada (2000)	Priesthood (2001)

View from Masada is the second studio album by the rapper Killah Priest, released in 2000. The Enhanced CD portion contains a video of "What Part of the Game?", with Ras Kass.

The album peaked at No. 73 on the Billboard 200.

== Production ==
Despite his affiliation with the Wu-Tang Clan, none of its members appear on the album. View from Masada was produced principally by Wiz and Just Blaze.

== Critical reception ==
Professional ratings
Review scores
Source	Rating
AllMusic	2.5/5 stars
Robert Christgau	(dud)
The Encyclopedia of Popular Music	3/5 stars
NME	5/10
The San Diego Union-Tribune	2.5/4 stars
The Source	3/5 stars
USA Today	3/4 stars

Exclaim! wrote: "Now trying to mesh his spiritual allusions with party-rocking lyrics, Killah Priest predictably fails to do either very well." The Hartford Courant deemed the album "an eclectic reflection of the everyday battle between heaven and hell." The Boston Herald thought that "Priest confuses matters on View From Masada, adopting a part-time gangsta persona that allows him to play both sides of the street in a way that seems cynical, given his previous street-tough idealism."

== Track listing ==
No.	Title	Producer(s)	Length
1.	"Intro"	LZA	2:08
2.	"View from Masada"	Just Blaze	4:07
3.	"Hard Times"	Just Blaze	4:18
4.	"Maccabean Revolt (Interlude)" (featuring Goldie Mack)	Daddy Rose	1:21
5.	"Maccabean Revolt" (featuring Maccabeez)	Daddy Rose	3:53
6.	"Gotta Eat"	Just Blaze	4:54
7.	"What Part of the Game?" (featuring Ras Kass)	Curt Gowdy	4:18
8.	"I'm Wit That"	Buddah and Shamello	3:22
9.	"Bop Your Head (Priesthood)" (featuring Canibus)	Q-Base	3:58
10.	"Rap Legend"	Wiz	3:38
11.	"Places I've Been"	Wiz	3:46
12.	"When Will We Learn?"	Wiz	4:17
13.	"Food for Thought (Interlude)" (featuring Daddy Rose)	LZA	1:36
14.	"Live By the Gun" (featuring Kavalier and Black Rose Kartel)	Daddy Rose	3:37
15.	"If I Die" (featuring Salla`udiin Rose)	Daddy Rose	4:03
16.	"Outro"	LZA	1:54

== Album singles ==
Single information
"Whut Part of the Game?" (featuring Ras Kass)
- Released: 2000
- B-Side: -
"I'm Wit That"
- Released: 2000
- B-Side: "Gotta Eat"
