= Can-I-Bus =

Studio album by Canibus
- Released: September 8, 1998
- Recorded: 1997–98
- Genre: Hip-hop
- Length: 48:00; 52:07 (with "How Come")
- Label: Universal
- Producers: A Kid Called Roots; Canibus; Clark Kent; Jerry 'Wonda' Duplessis; Joe Servilus; LG; Salaam Remi; Wyclef Jean

Canibus chronology
Can-I-Bus (1998)	2000 B.C. (Before Can-I-Bus) (2000)

Can-I-Bus is the debut album by American rapper Canibus, released on September 8, 1998, through Universal Records. The album was released after the rapper's success with his LL Cool J diss track, "Second Round K.O.", which was included on Can-I-Bus, with additional support from heavyweight boxer Mike Tyson. The album was promoted by Canibus on his official website, www.canibus.com, making him one of the first rappers to use a personal website to share music on the internet. He has since been recognized as an early pioneer of "internet rap".

However, the album received mixed reviews. The beats, created mostly by Wyclef Jean, were criticized for their blandness and unoriginality (with a fair amount of the criticism coming from Canibus), but lyrically, the album was praised. Tower Records referred to Canibus as "one of the most innovative new MCs in hip-hop. With Can-I-Bus, the debut album, Canibus delivers more of the battle-rhyme lyrics that are his stock in trade. Still, he manages to cover new ground with conceptually strong cuts like 'I Honor U,' which is dedicated to his mother. With his lyrical skills, Canibus represents the elements that helped build rap music." The album was certified gold by the RIAA 13 October 1998. The song "How We Roll" also appeared on the bonus 3rd disc of Eightball's album Lost.

== Critical reception ==
Professional ratings
Review scores
Source	Rating
AllMusic	2.5/5 stars
Robert Christgau	A
Entertainment Weekly	B
MVRemix	7/10
NME	8/10
RapReviews	5/10
Rolling Stone	2.5/5 stars
The Source	3/5 stars
Wall of Sound	66/100

Can-I-Bus garnered mixed reviews from music critics who generally admired Canibus' battle rap skills but criticised the production.

Hugo Lunny of MVRemix praised Canibus' battle rhymes but felt that the production didn't give them the necessary energy needed, highlighting "I Honor U" and "Channel Zero" for finding the right balance, concluding that "Overall, this is a good album, although anyone who's heard Canibus on 'Desperados' or 'Making A Name 4 Ourselves' is likely to find the album a bit too over hyped. However, listen to the album with fair expectations, and you'll enjoy it." David Browne, writing for Entertainment Weekly, praised Canibus for being able to go beyond the battle rapper image and show versatility in his topics but found the production a hindrance to his goal, concluding that "His devotion to the lyrical slam and to self-respect earmark Canibus as a contender, but it wouldn’t hurt him to learn a few things about record making–from, say, LL?" AllMusic's Stephen Thomas Erlewine found Canibus' aggro delivery tiring at times no matter the beat or subject but still gave credit for remaining impactful, concluding that "Unfortunately, those moments only occur sporadically over the course of this overlong debut, but when they do happen, it's easy to see what all the hype is about."

Wall of Sound's Oliver Wang felt that Wyclef Jean and Jerry Wonda's pop-sounding production didn't suit Canibus' tight flow and dark lyricism and preferred Clark Kent, Salaam Remi and LG as being a perfect match for his content, saying that "Like his West Coast counterpart, Ras Kass, Canibus proves that his rhyme rep isn't totally fabricated, but both artists blow their bets in trying to appeal to both underground and pop audiences." Kevin Powell of Rolling Stone felt the album lacked more personal tracks and intellectual insight to clear up the lyrical venom found throughout, concluding that "In these smoke-filled last days of the 1990s, Canibus and Can-I-Bus are exactly what much of hip-hop has become: a lot of hype. Don't believe it." DJ Fatboy of RapReviews found the album a big disappointment, criticizing Canibus for trying to change his hardcore lyricist image in order to appeal to a mainstream audience, saying that "It's as if he's embarrassed to be known as a battle rapper. What's wrong with that? Sure, it's a one note performance, but if he can play that one note better than all the other herbs out there, then he shouldn't waste his time and ours by switching up to a style he can't rock."

== Track listing ==
#	Title	Producer(s)	Length
1	"Intro"	Canibus; Wyclef Jean; Jerry Wonda (co-producer)	1:08
2	"Patriots"	Canibus (co-producer); Danny & Cyrus (co-producer); Jerry Wonda	3:03
3	"Get Retarded"	Canibus (co-producer); Salaam Remi	4:07
4	"Negronometry"	Canibus (co-producer); Jerry Wonda; LG	3:12
5	"Second Round K.O."	Canibus (co-producer); Wyclef Jean; Jerry Wonda	4:37
6	"What's Going On"	Canibus (co-producer); Jerry Wonda; LG	3:51
7	"I Honor U" (featuring Jenny Fujita)	Canibus (co-producer); Jerry Wonda; Wyclef Jean	4:34
8	"Hype-nitis"	Canibus (co-producer); Jerry Wonda; Joe Servilus (co-producer)	3:47
9	"How We Roll" (featuring Panama P.I.)	Clark Kent	3:45
10	"Channel Zero"	Canibus (co-producer); Clark Kent	4:29
11	"Let's Ride"	A Kid Called Roots; Canibus (co-producer); Jerry Wonda	3:57
12	"Buckingham Palace"	Canibus (co-producer); Jerry Wonda; Wyclef Jean	3:41
13	"Rip Rock"	Canibus (co-producer); Jerry Wonda; Wyclef Jean	3:49
14	"How Come" (feat. Youssou N'Dour) (present on some releases)	Canibus (co-producer); Jerry Wonda; Wyclef Jean	4:07

== Samples ==
"Get Retarded"

- "After The Dance" by Marvin Gaye
- "Christy" by L.A. Boppers

"Negronometry"

- "Brother's Gotta Work It Out" by Willie Hutch

"Second Recond K.O."

- "Introit" by Wolfgang Amadeus Mozart
- "Gone! The Promises of Yesterday" by The Mad Lads

"How We Roll"

- "Something for Nothing" by MFSB

"Channel Zero"

- "Christo Redentor" by Ferrante & Teicher

"Let's Ride"

- "You and I" by Goodie

"Rip Rock"

- "Streets of Cairo of the Poor Little Country Maid" by Sol Bloom

"What's Goin' On"

- "Interlude #2" by Bobby Womack
- "Big Poppa" by The Notorious B.I.G.
- "Live Nigga Rap" by Nas feat. Mobb Deep

"Hype-nitis"

- "The Look of Love" by Isaac Hayes
- "Vapors" by Biz Markie

== Singles ==
Single information
"Second Round K.O."
- Released: March 24, 1998
- B-side: "How We Roll"

== Charts ==
=== Album ===
Chart (1998)	Peak position
Canadian R&B Albums (SoundScan)	1
US Billboard 200	2
US Billboard Top Heatseekers	24
US Billboard Top R&B/Hip-Hop Albums	2

=== Singles ===
Year	Song	Chart positions				
Year	Song	Billboard Hot 100	Hot R&B/Hip-Hop Singles & Tracks	Hot Rap Singles	Hot Dance Music/Maxi-Singles Sales	Canadian Singles Chart
1998	"Second Round K.O."	28	13	3	5	9
