= Khari Kill =

Ethiopian-Trinidadian reggae artist

Khari Kill is an Ethiopian, born Trinidad and Tobago reggae singer from Factory Road, Diego Martin, the Westside. He was introduced to Massive B, Bobby Konders & Jabba (of Hot 97 Radio fame) by Soca DJ D Life. He was introduced to D Life by Out Of The Ghetto and Jah Bami/Jem Music. His first hit is "Picture of Selassie". It was released on the Massive B Label.

He has since toured the world doing shows/ Germany, Italy, Geneva, Costa Rica, Idaho, California, Nevada, Boston, Toronto, Miami, Ohio, Philly, New York, Panama, Jamaica etc. sharing the love and light of music and most important teaching others about the connection of Theocracy and The Ethiopian Orthodox Tewahedo Church. He pays homage to all musicians, singers, and players of instruments like Garnett Silk says, “Music is the rod and we are Moses”.

Khari has shared the stage with stars such Buju Banton, Capleton, I Wayne, Gyptian, Midnite, Pressure, Jah Bami, Thunderlions, Louie Culture, Richie Spice, Chezidek, Ky-Mani Marley, Jahmali, Lymie Murray, Toussaint, Lutan Fyah, ArchAngel, Junior Boogie, I-sasha, Zebulon, Million Voice, Marlon Asher, Prophet Benjamin, King David and many more.

In 2008, he released his album Picture Of Selassie and sold 60, 000 copies. His most recent work is Born To Rule released 2013. Khari Kill painted the album art on these albums.

Using his success he returned to his homeland of Trinidad and Tobago and funded one of the only large musical festivals named “A Cya Wait” for the artist of the communities. Khari Kill is not fond of the word local when used for a musician because music travels.

Khari Kill most recent work includes few singles that he is working on with Royal Order Music. He has also released other singles such as Sirens on the Hollow Body Riddim produced by Ted Dun Know Productions and Watch Over Dem on the Brighter Smile Riddim produced by Dread I Arts to complement his new album Born To Rule.
