= 2000 B.C. (Before Can-I-Bus) =

Studio album by Canibus
- Released: July 18, 2000
- Recorded: 1999–2000
- Genre: Hip-hop
- Length: 55:51
- Label: Universal
- Producers: Chaos; Daniel "Danny P" Pierre; DJ Clue; Duro; Irv Gotti; JuJu; Laze; Mike "Punch" Harper; Pillo Jamel; Taiwan Green; The Heatmakerz; Ty Fyffe

Canibus chronology
Can-I-Bus (1998)	2000 B.C. (Before Can-I-Bus) (2000)	C! True Hollywood Stories (2001)

Singles from 2000 B.C. (Before Can-I-Bus)
- 1. "2000 B.C." Released: 1999; 2. "Mic-Nificent" Released: 2000; 3. "Life Liquid" Released: 2000; 4. "Watch Who U Beef Wit" Released: 2000

2000 B.C. (Before Can-I-Bus) is the second studio album by American rapper Canibus, released on July 18, 2000, through Universal Records.

Considered to have been a significant improvement over his debut album, Can-I-Bus, 2000 B.C. featured multiple record producers and greater differentiation. On the title track, Canibus blames the commercial failure of his first album on the bland beats by Wyclef Jean whom he severed ties with to team up with various producers, ranging from Ty Fyffe to Irv Gotti. Allegedly, rapper Eminem was to be featured on the track "Phuk U", but turned down the offer.

== Critical reception ==
Professional ratings
Aggregate scores
Source	Rating
Metacritic	60/100
Review scores
Source	Rating
AllMusic	3/5 stars
Entertainment Weekly	D
NME	6/10
RapReviews	8/10
Rolling Stone	3/5 stars
SonicNet	2/5
Spin	8/10
Wall of Sound	71/100

2000 B.C. received mixed reviews from music critics, calling it an improvement over his debut album but still found problems with Canibus' lack of engaging topics, monotonous flow and subpar production. At Metacritic, which assigns a normalized score out of 100 to reviews from mainstream critics, the album received an average score of 60, based on 9 reviews.

Steve 'Flash' Juon of RapReviews praised the album's production for its bass-heavy underground approach and Canibus' lyrics for containing more vile and vitriol than his debut's pop rap content, saying that, "As a whole this sophomore album is easily as good or better than the first, but whether this will satisfy the people who've already written off Canibus is still anyone's guess." Nathan Rabin of The A.V. Club, despite finding the production uneven, the featured guests lacking lyrically and the use of a song structure missing, praised Canibus for lacing the songs by amplifying his battle-rapping style with imaginative content, saying that he "invests his rhymes with such dark humor, vivid imagery, and controlled passion that his lack of thematic ambition is forgivable". Wall of Sound's Jackie McCarthy praised the production for being subtle and using samples sparingly and Canibus' lyrical content, concluding that, "If 2000 B.C. is Canibus' attempt to rewrite his own musical history, erasing his missteps with LL Cool J and Wyclef, it'll be interesting to see who his next target will be."

Matt Conaway of AllMusic was mixed about the album, praising Canibus' delivery and battle rhymes for being attention-grabbing to the ears, but felt indifferent to the drum tracks conducted by the new producers, concluding that his "vast potential remains largely unrealized thanks to bland production". NME also commented on the production, saying that outside "The C-Quel" and the title track, it feels monotonous afterwards, saying that, "There's just not enough concepts or ideas on show - every song is a fist-fight to the death." Tony Green of Rolling Stone praised the album's first half for being able to match the production with Canibus' angry-filled lyrics but felt that the aggression depletes later on, concluding that, "Still, 2000 is a cut above his debut, making it the kind of second chance that you don't often get in the music biz."

Christopher O'Connor of SonicNet felt that the album was wasted potential and only exhibited inner male rage, concluding that, "It's ironic that for all of his intelligence, passion and obvious talent, Canibus chose to stoop to the caveman mentality so apparent on this release. 2000 B.C., indeed." Craig Seymour, writing for Entertainment Weekly, criticized Canibus for crafting the album with anger-filled tracks and should utilize his talents to make better songs. Jon Caramanica from Vibe said that despite the album having the appropriate production, Canibus still spits disses like he's going to war and will continue doing so with bloody hands, concluding that, "It's a hollow victory if there ever was one."

== Track listing ==
#	Title	Producer(s)	Featured guest(s)	Time
1	"The C-Quel"	Pillo Jamel; The Heatmakerz		3:36
2	"2000 B.C. (Before Can-I-Bus)"	Ty Fyffe; Laze		3:31
3	"Life Liquid"	JuJu	Journalist	4:24
4	"Shock Therapy" (interlude)			1:10
5	"Watch Who U Beef Wit"	Chaos		4:30
6	"I'll Buss 'Em U Punish 'Em"	DJ Clue; Duro	Rakim	4:07
7	"Mic-Nificent"	Daniel "Danny P" Pierre		3:13
8	"Die Slow"	Ty Fyffe	Journalist	4:00
9	"Doomsday News"	Chaos		3:33
10	"Lost @ "C""	Taiwan Green; Irv Gotti		4:59
11	"Phuk U"	Mike "Punch" Harper		4:04
12	"Horsemen"		Pharoahe Monch	1:22
13	"Horsementality"	Chaos	The HRSMN	5:59
14	"100 Bars"	Mike "Punch" Harper		4:58
15	"Chaos"	Chaos		2:29

Sample credits

- "The C-Quel", samples "4, 3, 2, 1" by LL Cool J, "Beasts From the East" by Lost Boyz, "Desperados" by The Firm, "How We Roll" by Canibus, "Making a Name for Ourselves" by Common and "Theme from S.W.A.T." by Rhythm Heritage
- "2000 B.C. (Before Can-I-Bus)", samples "Requiem Mass in D Minor" by Wolfgang Amadeus Mozart and "I Know You Got Soul" by Eric B. & Rakim

== Personnel ==
Credits for 2000 B.C. adapted from AllMusic.

- Leslie Braithwaite – engineer, mixing
- Chris Champion – engineer, mixing
- James Cruz – mastering
- Mark "Exit" Goodchild – mixing assistant, recording
- Irv Gotti – programming
- Cory Hall – assistant engineer
- Bruce Miller – engineer
- Jake Ninan – mixing
- Tony Prendatt – mixing
- Joe Quimby – engineer, mixing
- Walter Reed – composer
- Charles Suitt – executive producer

== Charts ==
=== Album ===
Chart (2000)	Peak position
UK R&B Albums (Official Charts)	20
US Billboard 200	23
US Top R&B/Hip-Hop Albums (Billboard)	6

=== Singles ===
Mic-Nificent

Chart (2000)	Peak position
US Hot Rap Singles (Billboard)	23
