= Priesthood (album) =

Studio album by Killah Priest
- Released: July 10, 2001
- Recorded: 2000–2001
- Genre: Hip hop
- Label: Proverbs
- Producer: Luminati, Nirocist

Killah Priest chronology
View from Masada (2000)	Priesthood (2001)	Black August (2003)

Professional ratings
Review scores
Source	Rating
AllMusic	4/5 stars
RapReviews	8/10
XXL	L (3/5)

Priesthood is the third studio album by Wu-Tang Clan affiliate and Sunz of Man rapper Killah Priest. He had previously cut ties with the Wu-Tang Clan after problems with its leader RZA, and this album receives no input from them.

Priesthood is Killah Priest's first independent release, as his last album, View from Masada, sold poorly and he was dropped from his label. As a result, the album received very limited distribution and low sales, though it was well received by critics.

== Track listing ==
No.	Title	Length
1.	"Intro (Blackball Me)"
2.	"Madness" (featuring Ty-N)
3.	"My Hood" (featuring Amber Alexis)
4.	"Horsemen Talk" (featuring The HRSMN)
5.	"Come with Me" (featuring George Clinton)
6.	"Royal Priesthood"
7.	"Crime Stories (Interlude)"
8.	"Witness the King"
9.	"Heat of the Moment"
10.	"C U When I Get There"
11.	"The One" (featuring George Clinton)
12.	"Thug Revelations" (featuring Maccabeez: Daddy Rose & Salla`udiin Rose)
13.	"My Life"
14.	"Places Where Pharaohs Go (Interlude)"
15.	"The Law" (featuring Luminati)
16.	"Theme Song"
