= The Horsemen Project =

EP by The HRSMN
- Released: October 20, 2003
- Recorded: 2000–2003
- Genre: Hip hop
- Length: 38:32
- Labels: Think Differently Music; Proverbs Music Inc.
- Producers: Mark Sparks; Dreddy Kruger; Numba9

The HRSMN chronology
| The Horsemen Project (2003) | The Last Ride (2021) |

Professional ratings
Review scores
| Source | Rating |
|---|---|
| Rap Reviews | 6/10 stars |

The Horsemen Project is the first EP released by the hip hop supergroup The HRSMN through Think Differently Music and Proverbs Music Inc. on October 20, 2003.

The album itself is rare as only a limited number of copies were produced.

== Track listing ==
| # | Title | Producer(s) | Performer(s) |
|---|---|---|---|
| 1 | "The Horsemen" | Mark Sparks | Verse 1/Chorus: Canibus; Verse 2: Pak Man; Verse 3: Killah Priest; Verse 4: Ras Kass; Verse 5: Kurupt |
| 2 | "Shaky Love" | Numba9 | Intro/Chorus: unknown reggae artist; Verse 1: Kurupt; Verse 2: Killah Priest; Verse 3: Canibus |
| 3 | "Leather Steeds" | Dreddy Kruger | Chorus: Canibus, Kurupt, Killah Priest; Verse 1: Ras Kass; Verse 2: Canibus; Verse 3: Kurupt; Verse 4: Killah Priest |
| 4 | "Fourth Windz Blow" | Numba9 | Verse 1/Chorus: Killah Priest; Verse 2: Ras Kass; Verse 3: Canibus |
| 5 | "The 4 Horsemen of the Apocalypse" | Dreddy Kruger | Verse 1/Chorus/Outro: Kurupt; Verse 2: Ras Kass; Verse 3: Canibus; Verse 4: Killah Priest |
| 6 | "Revelationz" | Dreddy Kruger | Verse 1: Canibus; Verse 2: Kurupt; Verse 3: Ras Kass; Verse 4: Killah Priest |
| 7 | "The Fourth Seal" | Dreddy Kruger | Verse 1: Canibus; Verse 2/Chorus: Kurupt; Verse 3: Killah Priest |
| 8 | "Cavalier" | Dreddy Kruger | Verse 1/Chorus: Kurupt; Verse 2: Canibus; Verse 3: Killah Priest; Verse 4: Ras Kass |
| 9 | "Scrolls" | Numba9 | Verse 1: Kurupt; Verse 2: Canibus; Verse 3: Kurupt; Chorus: Kurupt & Canibus |
