= Canibus =

American rapper (born 1974)

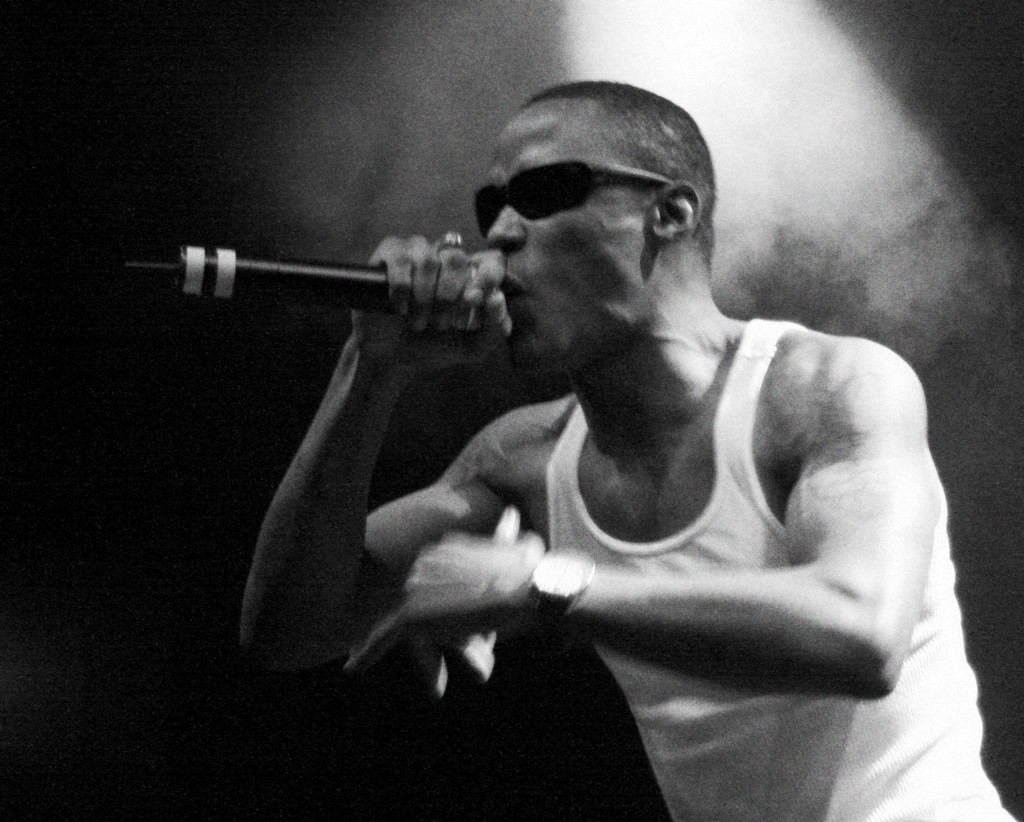
- Canibus performing 2007

Background information
- Born: Germaine Williams; December 9, 1974 (age 51); Kingston, Jamaica
- Origin: The Bronx, New York City, U.S.
- Genres: East Coast hip-hop; hardcore hip-hop
- Occupations: Rapper; actor; songwriter
- Works: Canibus discography
- Years active: 1996–present
- Labels: RBC; Universal; Archives Music; Babygrande; Gladiator; War Lab
- Member of: The Hrsmn; Refugee Camp All-Stars

Germaine Williams (born December 9, 1974), better known by his stage name Canibus, is a Jamaican-American rapper. First having gained recognition for his freestyling abilities, he signed with Universal Records to release his debut studio album, Can-I-Bus (1998). He has since released 13 solo studio albums, and several collaborative projects with other rappers as a member of the Four Horsemen, Refugee Camp All-Stars, Sharpshooterz, Cloak N Dagga, the Undergods and one-half of T.H.E.M.

About.com placed him at number 32 on their list of the "Top 50 MCs of Our Time (1987–2007)", while in 2012 The Source placed him number 44 on their list of the Top 50 Lyricists of All Time. Through promoting his music on his personal website he was later recognized as an early pioneer of "internet rap".

== Early life ==
Williams was born on December 9, 1974, in Kingston, Jamaica. He is of Jamaican descent. His father, Basil Williams, was a Jamaican and West Indian cricketer. The family moved frequently, living in The Bronx; Newark, New Jersey; Washington, D.C.; Atlanta; Miami; Buffalo; and London due to his mother's career requiring constant relocation. Canibus stated that he was an introverted child growing up.

After completing high school in 1992, he spent a year working for AT&T Corporation and another year as a data analyst for the U.S. Department of Justice. He studied computer science at DeKalb College in Atlanta.

== Career ==
=== Debut album (1997–1998) ===
Canibus' debut album Can-I-Bus was released on September 8, 1998. The song "Second Round K.O.", produced by Wyclef Jean, was a success, with the video featuring Wyclef and a cameo appearance by boxer Mike Tyson. This song formed part of Canibus' famous beef with LL Cool J.

The album contained a lot of socially-conscious material, such as corruption within the U.S. government, AIDS, and violence in modern America.

Canibus had a feud with LL Cool J over a verse that Canibus gave on LL's track "4,3,2,1" from his album Phenomenon. The track featured Canibus, Method Man, Redman, and DMX. Canibus's verse began with the line "Yo LL, is that a mic on your arm? Let me borrow that," referring to the microphone tattoo on LL Cool J's arm which LL Cool J interpreted as Canibus insulting him. When the final cut of the song came out it featured LL Cool J's verse after Canibus', mocking an unspecified person believed to be Canibus.

=== Feud with Eminem (1998-2003) ===
In 2003, a bootleg album known as Straight from the Lab was released, containing several unreleased tracks by rapper Eminem. Among the contents of the album was a diss track called "Can-I-Bitch", which is a word play on Canibus' debut album Can-I-Bus. The track targets mainly Canibus and partially the Pet Shop Boys. The feud stemmed from Canibus and Wyclef confronting Eminem and asking him if he had ghost-written the track "The Ripper Strikes Back" by LL Cool J. Eminem denied that he wrote the track. After he was confronted, Eminem said Canibus was "rude" to him. After plans of Eminem being included on the track "Phuck U", from his album 2000 B.C. were shelved, Canibus continued to diss him on the tracks "U Didn't Care" in 2000, and "Dr. C. Phd" in 2002, and over a year later, the track "Can-I-Bitch" leaked.

=== For Whom the Beat Tolls (2007) ===
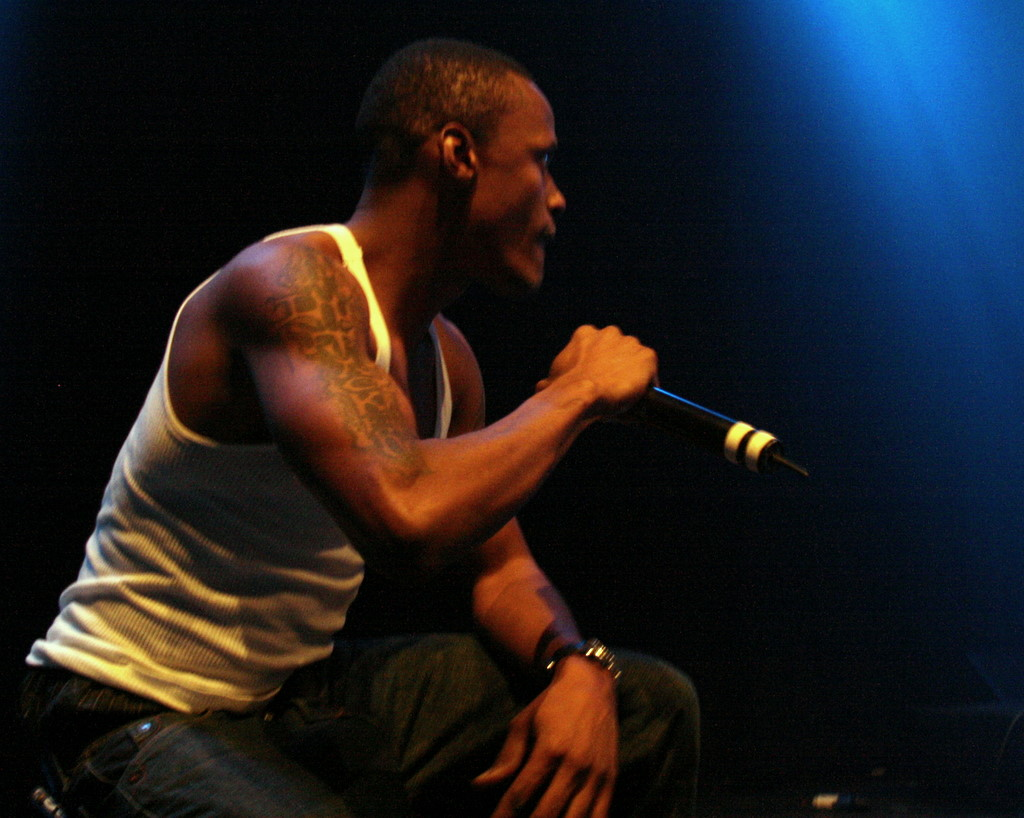
Canibus performing in 2007

When the record was originally announced in March, there was only one confirmed track – the third installment in Canibus' "Poet Laureate" series, "Poet Laureate Infinity". The track has 1,000 bars, in the form of five 200 bar verses, and is layered in such a way that "when you mix it and spread it throughout five channels, [you have the ability] to mix the track differently every time".

=== Melatonin Magik (2010) ===
In December 2009, it was announced that Canibus was in the process of releasing his 9th studio album Melatonin Magik.

=== C of Tranquility (2010) ===
C of Tranquility was released on October 5, 2010. Producers include DJ Premier, Jake One, Scram Jones, Tha Bizness and J-Zone.

=== Canibus vs Dizaster (2012) ===
Canibus completed his first rap battle for King of the Dot on June 9, 2012. Canibus participated in the first two rounds before pulling out a notepad to read his bars during the third round, after admitting defeat and wishing to recite what he said were "30 pages of rhymes" that he had failed to memorize. The battle was part of King of the Dot's Fresh Coast division in L.A.

A fake open letter, attributed to Canibus appeared on Tumblr, though it was later debunked by his manager. Canibus later released an official statement on his Facebook page. About the battle itself, Canibus commented that "Sometimes people need laughter and entertainment at the expense of others embarrassment but hip hop means so much to me I don't care."

== Army service ==
In 2002, Canibus signed up for the United States Army. In a 2005 interview, Canibus stated "I enlisted because I wanted to get away from the music... I wanted to do something that gave me a separate definition from what I had done all through my teens and twenties. I was 28 when I enlisted." In 2004, he was caught smoking cannabis and was subsequently discharged.

== Discography ==
=== Albums ===
Solo

- Can-I-Bus (1998)
- 2000 B.C. (Before Can-I-Bus) (2000)
- C! True Hollywood Stories (2001)
- Mic Club: The Curriculum (2002)
- Rip the Jacker (2003) (produced by Stoupe the Enemy of Mankind)
- Mind Control (2005)
- Hip-Hop for Sale (2005)
- For Whom the Beat Tolls (2007)
- Melatonin Magik (2010)
- C of Tranquility (2010)
- Lyrical Law (2011)
- Fait Accompli (2014)
- Time Flys, Life Dies... Phoenix Rise (2015) (produced by Bronze Nazareth)
- Kaiju (2021) (produced by Body Bag Ben)
- One Step Closer to Infinity (2022)

Collaborations

- The Horsemen Project (2003) (with Killah Priest, Kurupt & Ras Kass, as The Four Horsemen)
- Def Con Zero (2005) (with Phoenix Orion, as Cloak N Dagga)
- In Gods We Trust – Crush Microphones to Dust (2011) (with Keith Murray, as The Undergods)
- Scars n Stripes (2010) (with Matt Maddox;)
- Lyrical Warfare (2011) (with Webb, as T.H.E.M.; recorded from 1993 to 1995)
- The 2nd Coming (2013) (with Bronze Nazareth, Cappadonna, M-Eighty, Nino Grave & Planet Asia, as Almighty)
- The Last Ride (2021) (with Killah Priest, Kurupt & Ras Kass, as HRSMN)
- Microphone Land (2021) (with Jaximus)
- Self Licking Ice Cream Cone (2023) (with Johnny Slash)
- Play No Games (2023) (with Ras Kass & Shane Dollar)
- Necksnapper LP (2026) (with Chino XL)

=== EPs ===
- Canibus & Keith Murray Are The Undergods (2009) (with Keith Murray, as The Undergods)
- Historic EP (2014) (with Killah Priest, Kurupt & Ras Kass, as HRSMN)
- Full Spectrum Dominance (2018)
- Full Spectrum Dominance 2 (2018)
- Matrix Theory I (2018) (with Marty McKay)
- Full Spectrum Dominance 3 (2019)
- Matrix Theory II (2019) (with Marty McKay)
- Full Spectrum Dominance: Repolarization (2019)
- Matrix Theory III (2019) (with Marty McKay)
- Matrix Theory IV (2020) (with Marty McKay)
- Matrix Theory V (2021) (with Marty McKay)
- C (2022) (with Pete Rock)

== Filmography ==
- Eyes on Hip Hop (1995) – self
- Bamboozled (2000) – Mo Blak
- Beef II (2004) – self
- The MC: Why We Do It (2005) – self
