= Killah Priest =

American rapper (born 1970)

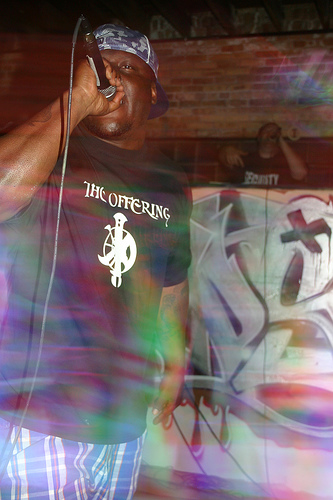
- Killah Priest performing in 2007

Background information
- Also known as: Priest; Iron Sheik from the Middle East; 8 Deer Ocelot Claw; Masada; Lord Messiah
- Born: Walter Reed; August 16, 1970 (age 56); Brooklyn, New York City, U.S.
- Genres: Hip hop; alternative hip hop
- Occupations: Rapper; songwriter; record producer; actor; podcaster
- Years active: 1993–present
- Labels: Geffen; MCA; Legion of D.O.O.M.
- Member of: Black Market Militia; The Hrsmn; Sunz of Man; Thug Vaticans

Walter Reed (born August 16, 1970), better known by his stage name Killah Priest, is an American rapper, a member of Sunz of Man, and a Wu-Tang Clan affiliate who was born and raised in Brooklyn, New York. He is known for his intensely spiritual lyrics, containing religious references and metaphors. He is connected to the Hebrew Israelites through his rhymes, and is known for his controversial and political subject matter. He is also a part of supergroup the HRSMN along with Canibus, Ras Kass, and Kurupt.

== Biography ==
=== 1990s ===
Killah Priest made his debut on two songs on the Gravediggaz album 6 Feet Deep (which are "Diary of a Madman" and "Graveyard Chamber") in 1994, and followed this with two appearances on each of two Wu-Tang Clan solo albums, Ol' Dirty Bastard's Return to the 36 Chambers: The Dirty Version and GZA's Liquid Swords, both from 1995 (see 1995 in music). Liquid Swords in fact included a Killah Priest solo track titled "B.I.B.L.E. (Basic Instructions Before Leaving Earth)". Also in 1995, Priest's group Sunz Of Man with rappers Hell Razah, 60 Second Assassin, Prodigal Sunn, Shabazz the Disciple were signed to Wu-Tang Records and released three 12" singles through the label. Initially Sunz Of Man included Shabazz the Disciple, who had previously been in a duo with Priest called The Disciples Of Armageddon.

Killah Priest's first solo album was Heavy Mental, released on Geffen Records on February 24, 1998. It mostly expanded on the themes of "B.I.B.L.E.", featuring religious references and allegory woven into commentary on African American society and history. The album was mostly produced by the Wu-Elements producers, a group of in-house Wu-Tang producers mentored by Wu leader RZA, including producer 12th Disciple. Sunz Of Man released their debut album The Last Shall Be First later in 1998, but by that time Priest's ties to the Wu were beginning to weaken, as he and long-time friend Shabazz clashed with RZA (their business ties with the Wu also began to weaken after the GZA Entertainment management agency, which they were both signed to, dissolved in 1996). After unsuccessful attempts by the pair to create new post-Wu Tang crews (Priest proposed a crew called the Maccabeez which would include himself, Shabazz and Timbo King among others, while Shabazz proposed a group including himself and Priest called the Sunz Of Thunder) they both effectively went their separate ways and cut their respective Wu-Tang ties.

=== 2000s ===
After leaving the Wu stable, and consequently also effectively leaving Sunz Of Man, Priest helped form the hip hop supergroup The HRSMN with Ras Kass, Canibus and Kurupt. In October 2003, Killah Priest and Dreddy Kruger released a nine track album entitled The Horsemen Project. It was released independently through Think Differently Music/Proverbs Music Inc. and was only available to purchase off the internet. Each track featured at least two members of the group as well as an appearance by Pak Man. It is currently unknown who handled the majority of the production on the album, although it is known that Mark Sparks was responsible for two songs. On Killah Priest's HipHopGame.com journal, he mentions the Horsemen a few times. The talks about a new album were mentioned on the May 1, 2006 entry. He said "The Horsemen project is definitely going to come. Right now we just have to get Kurupt. He's been doing the Dogg Pound thing, but it's definitely going to come. We have songs recorded and we have more in store."

Ras Kass and Canibus were featured on Priest's second album, View From Masada, which featured no Wu-Tang input whatsoever (though the album's liner notes included the note "Peace to Wu-Tang Clan"). The album had a decidedly more commercially minded style than Heavy Mental, and introduced his new Maccabeez such as Daddy Rose, Salahudin Rose, Sant Rose and Najee Rose—part of a crew of then-unknown rappers who now go under the name Rose Cartell. The album was an important early stepping stone to stardom for producer Najee7thStar, Daddy Rose, and Just Blaze, who would later go on to produce countless mainstream hip hop hits for the likes of Cam'ron, Erick Sermon, Fabolous and Jay-Z. However, View From Masada received mixed reviews.

Priest had to leave the major labels behind after View From Masada sold poorly. His first independent release Priesthood (2001), released on Proverbs Music, his own record label, was critically acclaimed though it suffered from very limited distribution. Black August followed in 2003 on Recon Records, and was also well received. Priest also released an album on the Internet titled Black August Revisited a few months after the release of Black August which shared few similarities with the original, save its title. Black August Revisited also saw Priest rediscover his Wu-Tang ties, including collaborations with Hell Razah and Ol' Dirty Bastard. He also appeared in the music video for the single "Made You Look" by fellow New York rapper Nas. In 2009, Killah Priest launched the controversial music video "Redemption" directed by One_Over. The video promotes the beliefs of the Black Hebrew Israelites that believe in the 12 Tribes of Israel in the name of Jesus Christ (Yahawashi Ha Mashayach).

In 2004, Priest performed numerous times with other Wu-Tang Killa Beez and also appeared on Masta Killa's album No Said Date. November 2005 saw the re-release of Priesthood on Mic Club Music, a label owned by Louis Lombard III (aka Luminati), who produced Priesthood as well as recent albums by Canibus. March 2007 saw the release of Killah Priest's mixtape album "End of the World".

On August 21, 2007, Killah Priest released The Offering, which was sequenced by his former manager, Stacey Castro and featured appearances from Nas, Immortal Technique, his fellow HRSMN, & 4th Disciple as well as Hell Razah, who appears on the advance single title track that was released in October 2005.

Killah Priest next album titled Behind the Stained Glass, was released on May 20, 2008 on the label Good Hands Records. It is reported that he's also in the midst of recording Behind the Stained Glass Part Two. Killah Priest also released an album titled Elizabeth on October 20, 2009 on Proverbs Records, which Priest owns and he put out a movie/DVD A Day In the Life of Killah Priest feat Najee7thStar and Hot Flames. Killah Priest is also recording another double album called The Psychic World of Walter Reed, produced by Dutch producers Godz Wrath, 4th Disciple, RZA, and more. Killah Priest also mentioned in a YouTube interview for Pyramid West that he is also working on a sequel to Heavy Mental called Heavier Mental.

=== 2010s and beyond ===
In an August 2010 radio interview with Mista Montana, Killah Priest discussed the creation of his next album The Psychic World of Walter Reed, stating that the RZA and many other key Wu-Tang Clan members will feature on there, including the Four Horsemen.

After several delays, The Psychic World of Walter Reed was released on February 25, 2013. On March 11, 2013 Priest was hosting the Digital Dynasty 24, after already hosting Digital Dynasty 15.5.

Killah Priest has mentioned a number of projects he's been working on, including The Untold Story of Walter Reed Pt. 2, Castle Hop (both produced by DJ Woool), Natural Born Killers with Ghostface Killah and Planet of the Gods (produced by Dutch producer team Godz Wrath, who worked with Priest several times already). In April 2014, he said he had postponed The Untold Story of Walter Reed Pt. 2, and was finishing up Planet of the Gods, which was released on June 4, 2015. He also appeared on four tracks on the critically acclaimed album, For The Future Of Hip-Hop featuring Killah Priest, Pugs Atomz and Awdazcate, produced by Bryan Ford and released May 2016. On February 27, 2017, exactly 8 years after the first part, he released The Untold Story of Walter Reed Pt. 2.

=== Podcasting ===
In 2021 Priest launched his podcast on his official YouTube Channel discussing such topics in depth as Islam, Judaism, Ifá, Quimbanda, Astrotheology, Transhumanism, Cymatics, the Kabbalah, Sacred Geometry, Herbal Medicine and more . As well as interviewing a variety of guest . Some which have included Chris Taylor, 9th Prince, Shyheim, Dr. Har Hari Khalsa, Jordan Maxwell, Sophia Stewart, John Newsom, David Icke, Santos Bonacci, Scarub, Zab Judah, Flea (musician), Ras Kass, Lord Jamar and many more.

== Discography ==
- Heavy Mental (1998)
- View from Masada (2000)
- Priesthood (2001)
- Black August (2003)
- The Offering (2007)
- Behind the Stained Glass (2008)
- The Exorcist (2009)
- The 3 Day Theory (2010)
- The Psychic World of Walter Reed (2013)
- Planet of the Gods (2015)

== Filmography ==
Year	Title	Director	Role
2000	Boricua's Bond	Val Lik	as himself
2009	All Tomorrow's Parties	Jonathan Caouette	as himself
2015	Holy Shit	Jozef K. Richards	"Killah Priest"
2017	Batman & Jesus	Jozef K. Richards	as himself
