= One Be Lo discography =

This is the discography of the American hip-hop artist One Be Lo (a.k.a. OneManArmy). It also includes work with his groups Binary Star (with Senim Silla), Security (with Magestik Legend), and work from Subterraneous Records compilations.

== One Be Lo ==
=== Albums ===
Album information
Project: F.E.T.U.S.

For Everybody That UnderStands

- First Release: 2002
  - Label: Subterraneous Records
  - Released As: "OneBeLo"
- Second Release: 2003
  - Label: The LA Underground / Subterraneous Records
  - Released As: "OneBeLo a.k.a. OneManArmy"
- Third release: 2007 (2CD version)
  - Label: The LA Underground / Subterraneous Records
  - Released As: "OneManArmy"
S.O.N.O.G.R.A.M.

Sounds Of Nahshid Originate Good Rhymes And Music

- Release Date: February 8, 2005
- Label: Fat Beats Records / Subterraneous Records
- Released As: "One.Be.Lo also known as OneManArmy of Binary Star"
- Single(s): "Rocketship b/w E.T.", "Decepticons (Pete Rock Remix)", "Sleepwalking b/w Unparalleled"
The R.E.B.I.R.T.H.

Real Emcee's Bring Intelligent Rhymes To Hip-Hop

- Release Date: December 11, 2007
- Label: Subterraneous Records
- Released As: "One Be Lo a.k.a. One Man Army"
L.A.B.O.R.

Language Arts Based On Reality

- Release Date: September 6, 2011
- Label: Subterraneous Records
- Released As: "One Be Lo Soundtrack"
K.I.C.K. P.U.S.H.

Keep It Cool Kid People Usually Show Hate

- Release Date: May 1, 2012
- Label: Subterraneous Records
- Released As: "One Be Lo Starring as Rahlo"
C-S.E.C.T.I.O.N.

Court Side Experiences Craft The Imagination Of Nashid

- Release Date: July 30, 2020
- Label: Subterraneous Records
- Released As: "One Be Lo"
B.A.B.Y.

Being a Black Youth

- Release Date: November 7, 2020
- Label: Subterraneous Records
- Released As: "One Be Lo"

=== Official mixtapes ===
Mixtape information
S.T.I.L.L.B.O.R.N.

Something To Interest Lo Listeners Beyond Original Recorded Networkings; or Subterraneous/Trackezoids Invest Lost Lyrics Bringing Old Rhymes New

- Release Date: 2005
- Label: Subterraneous Records
- Released As: "One Be Lo & DJ Scene"
Laborhood Part 1
- Release Date: 28 July 2011
- Label: Subterraneous Records
- Released As: "One Be Lo Presents"
Laborhood Part 2
- Release Date: 19 August 2011
- Label: Subterraneous Records
- Released As: "One Be Lo Presents"
Laborhood Part 3
- Release Date: 14 March 2012
- Label: Subterraneous Records
- Released As: "One Be Lo Presents"
Laborhood Part 4
- Release Date: 25 June 2015
- Label: Subterraneous Records
- Released As: "One Be Lo Presents"
10 G.R.A.Ms

10 (years) Good Rhymes And MusicianS

- Release Date: 20 July 2015
- Label: Subterraneous Records
- Released As: "One Be Lo, Gorilla Funk Mob"
The Original Born Ones
- Release Date: 27 February 2016
- Label: Subterraneous Records
- Released As: "Subterraneous Records presents One Be Lo of Binary Star + Bean One"
Laborhood Part 5
- Release Date: 24 November 2017
- Label: Subterraneous Records
- Released As: "One Be Lo Presents"
Songs of Songs
- Release Date: 7 November 2022
- Label: Subterraneous Records
- Released As: "One Be Lo"

=== Singles ===
Single information
"Rocketship b/w E.T."
- Format: 12 Inch Vinyl
- Album: S.O.N.O.G.R.A.M.
- Release Date: 2004
- Label: Fat Beats Records / Subterraneous Records
- Released As: "OneBeLo The artist formally known as One Man Army of the group Binary Star"
"Decepticons (Pete Rock Remix)"
- Format: 12 Inch Vinyl
- Album: S.O.N.O.G.R.A.M.
- Release Date: 2005
- Label: Fat Beats Records / Subterraneous Records
- Released As: "One.Be.Lo also known as One Man Army of Binary Star"
"Sleepwalking b/w Unparalleled"
- Format: 12 Inch Vinyl
- Album: S.O.N.O.G.R.A.M.
- Release Date: 2005
- Label: Fat Beats Records / Subterraneous Records
- Released As: "One.Be.Lo The artist also known as One Man Army of Binary Star"

== Binary Star ==
=== Albums ===
Album information
Waterworld
- Release Date: 1999
- Label: Terrorist
- Single(s): "New Hip Hop b/w Slang Blade, Glen Close, Dat Fast Food Joint"
Masters of the Universe
- Release Date: 31 October 2000
- Label: Subterraneous Records
- Single(s): "Reality Check b/w Conqustadors, K.G.B.", "Solar Powered b/w Masters of the Universe, OneManArmy"
Binary Star EP (15 Year Anniversary Edition)
- Release Date: 29 March 2013
- Label: Subterraneous Records
- Single(s): n/a
Masters of the Universe (MOTU) (re-release)
- Release Date: 22 March 2016
- Label: Subterraneous Records
- Single(s): n/a
Water World 3
- Release Date: 2 June 2017
- Label: Subterraneous Records
- Single(s): n/a
LIGHTY
- Release Date: 24 August 2018
- Label: Subterraneous Records
- Single(s): n/a
EARS APART
- Release Date: 24 August 2018
- Label: Subterraneous Records
- Single(s): n/a

=== Singles ===
Single information
"New Hip Hop b/w Slang Blade, Glen Close, Dat Fast Food Joint"
- Format: 12 Inch Vinyl & Cassette Tape
- Album: Waterworld
- Release Date: 1998
- Label: Terrorist / Federation Records
"Masters of the Universe 01"

Reality Check b/w Conquistadors, K.G.B.

- Format: 12 Inch Vinyl
- Album: Masters of the Universe
- Release Date: 2000
- Label: Subterraneous Records
"Masters of the Universe 02"

Solar Powered b/w Masters of the Universe, OneManArmy

- Format: 12 Inch Vinyl
- Album: Masters of the Universe
- Release Date: 2000
- Label: Subterraneous Records

== Subterraneous Records ==
=== Albums ===
Album information
WaterWorld Too
- Release Date: 2001
- Label: Subterraneous Records
- Single(s): "Rivers Run Wild b/w Word'em Up"

=== Singles ===
Single information
"Rivers Run Wild b/w Word'em Up"
- Format: 12 Inch Vinyl
- Album: WaterWorld Too
- Release Date: 2002
- Label: Subterraneous Records

== Guest appearances ==
=== On albums ===
Year	Artist	Album	Title	Other featured guests
2000	S.U.N.	School Of Thought	"Writings"	—
2001	Athletic Mic League	The Thrill is Gone	"Mo Rhymes Mo Beats"*	Senim Silla
2001	Athletic Mic League	The Thrill is Gone	"Lyrictricity"	—
2001	Ron Dada	LowLands	"Weapons"	Apokalypse, Proof & Miz Korona
2001	Frontline	Overlooked	"Watch Your Back"	Magestik Legend
2001	DJ Heavy	Heavy Rotation Vol. 6	"Interlude"	Tha` Almighty Dreadnaughtz
2002	Athletic Mic League	Sweats & Kicks	"F.E.V.E.R."	Magestik Legend
2002	Funktelligence	Earthtones	"The Movement"	Magestik Legend
2002	The Planets	The Opening	"The Medicine"	—
2002	Frontline	Sine Language	"Neighborhoods"	Illite & Magestik Legend
2002	Musab	Respect the Life	"Make Believe"	—
2002	DJ Graffiti	Bling Free Volume 2 "Wake Up"	"Exclusive"	—
2002	S.U.N.	The Art Of S.U.N.	"Blaze A Path"	Vital & Buff1
2002	Strange Brew	The First Round	"Tribute: Live At The Brewery"	Magestik Legend
2003	PhilaFlava	Presents: A League Of Our Own	"Dickhead Tracy"	Boom Bap Project
2004	Scribble Jam	Compilation Volume 2	"Behind The Music"	Magestik Legend
2004	Verbal Kent	What Box	"Combat"	—
2005	Zo!	Re:Definition	"Rocketship (Remix)"	—
2005	Boom Bap Project	Welcome To Seattle (Hosted By DJ Scene)	"Dickhead Tracy"	—
2005	Boom Bap Project	Welcome To Seattle (Hosted By DJ Scene)	"Get With This"	—
2005	T5E (Tha 5th Element)	First Strike	"Fight Club"	—
2005	Octane	The Closest Thing To Him	"I Thought The World Was Mine"	—
2006	The GMC and ERC	Dedicated	"All In"	El Da Sensei
2006	Octane & Illite	The Forgotten...Chosen	"Bassline"	Kodac
2006	Octane & Illite	The Forgotten...Chosen	"Clap"	Elzhi
2006	Deep Rooted	The Second Coming	"Break of Dawn"	—
2007	EV Records	Presents: Everything	"Learn"	Longshot
2007	Decompoze	Decomposition	"Lap2"	—
2007	Decompoze	Decomposition	"All Out"	J.U.I.C.E., Invincible, Magestik Legend & Elzhi
2007	Decompoze	Decomposition	"We Over Here"	Octane & Illite
2007	Decompoze	Decomposition	"Freakin' Flo's	—
2007	Black Milk	Popular Demand	"Take It There"	—
2007	Buff1	Pure	"Much Better"	Jackson Perry
2007	Cap D	Return Of The Renegade	"The Answer"	—
2007	Boom Bap Project	The Shakedown	"Get With This"	—
2007	Dante & Deck	The Fixtape	"Squawk & Roll Redux"	—
2007	The Aztext	The Sacred Document	"Lettin' You Know"	—
2008	DJ Cadik	Basic	"One For You"	—
2008	Dyme Def	3 Bad Brothaaas Mixtape	"Bring It Back"	—
2008	Longshot	Addicted	"Care Enuf"	Ang13 & Ka Di
2009	Grynch	Chemistry EP	"Chemistry"	—
2009	Grynch	Chemistry 1.5	"Chemistry (D-Sane Remix)"	—
2009	Kam Moye	Splitting Image	"Life Line"	—
2009	Beat Trotterz	Beat Trotterz Mixtape - Vol. 2 Starring Cymarshall Law (Mixed by Lord Faz)	"Family"	Cymarshall Law
2009	The Crest	Cheerful Robots	"Carmen"	Whatfor
2010	Moe Dirdee	M.O.E. (Mark Of Excellence)	"You Think You Know"	—
2010	Zumbi & The ARE	The Burnerz	"Off the Wall"	—
2010	Jern Eye & Headnodic	Infinity Gems EP	"Everlasting"	Roc-C & Khai Sharieff
2010	Buff1 & DJ Rhettmatic	Crown Royale	"The Chosen Show"	MED, Tres Styles, Fashawn, Marvwon, Bishop Lamont, Guilty Simpson, Ras Kass & Chino XL
2011	Verbal Kent	Save Yourself	"Last Laugh"	Masta Ace
2011	JYoung The General	Black History Year: Installment 2	"Panthers"	Mae Day & J.A.E.
2011	Jeff Baraka (O-Type Star)	Driving Songs Volume One: An Alternate Route	"Thoughts Take Flight"	Senim Silla
2011	Matt Black	We Buy Gold	"Exile"	—
2011	Catch Lungs	Awake In A Dream	"Hooliganry"	—
2011	Stik Figa & D/Will	Happy Hour	"Tweeny-One"	Richard Wright, Lou Rip, Les IZMORE, Ubi of Ces Cru & Dominique Larue
2011	Essence	Right Now	"Hardly Rock"	Decompoze
2011	DJ Twelvz	Forever Forward	"Forever Forward"	Young Gully, Tableek Of Maspyke, San Quinn & Stic.Man of Dead Prez
2011	Descry	As Serenity Approaches	"Celebrate"	Dumbfoundead, Oddisee, Substantial, Donwill, Roc Marciano, Y-O & Trek Life
2011	Headnodic	Red Line Radio	"Durty Diamonds"	Moe Pope, Bru Lei, Very, Jern Eye & Nightclubber Lang
2011	So Realistic	Alarm Clock Tunes	"Lettin' Go"	—
2011	Kodac a.k.a. M80	Blessed By A Broken Heart (The Experience)	"Home Is..."	Senim Silla
2011	Varsity Squad Presents Jon Quest	The Real Adventures Of Jonny Quest (Season 2)	"U Minor, We Major"	—
2011	Lon Won	Higher Standards	"Wash Away"	—
2012	Dox Black	Black Dynamite	"The Five"	Fess Grandiose
2012	Marcus D	Melancholy Hope	"Third Person"	—
2012	Gameboi	Young & Restless	"Rise"	Ro Spit
2012	Ro Spit	The American Dream EP (Hosted By District 81)	"One Man Alone"	—
2012	FYA	No Gravity	"Solar System"	DMT
2012	MTHDS	Pretty Deep	"Trade"	—
2012	Autocons	Autocons Present: New Yak City (unreleased)	"Rock Music"	Ro Spit
2013	Flu a.k.a. Fluent Form	FluSeason	"Dose Of Slang"	—
2013	SubKulture Patriots	The Kulture Riots	"Classic"	—
2013	Kodac a.k.a. M80	Foreign Affair	"The Feeling"	DJ Drama
2013	Rick Chyme	The 5iveit LP	"Shades Of Blue"	Molly Bouwsma Schultz & Mike Phillips Jr
2013	Def Dee	33 And A Third	"Coke nDa Canine"	Kenn Starr & Chev
2013	JFK	Necessary Assassination	"Fresh Like D Say"	Mic Phelps
2013	Shoda Ish	FoxP2	"The Essence"	—
2014	Def Dee	Déjà Vu	"Toss N Turn"	—
2014	J. Ross Parrelli	Protostar	"Unstoppable"	Toni Hill
2014	Various	BurntBerry X Straight Path Jewlz Mixtape	"Connected"	DJ Twelve, Zumbi & Tableek
2015	David Dalla G	All Sides	"Fade To Black"	Sapient
2015	HASEEB x Curtiss King	The Daisy Chain EP	"All Natural"	—
2015	Jessica Care Moore	Black Tea: The Legend Of Jessi James	"Deep Breath"	—
2016	Zip Grandiose	DIRTY	"One Be Lo skit"	—
2016	DJ Illogik	beginningofsomethinG.old	"Waiting For Something Random"	Maurice Daniel
2016	DJ Illogik	beginningofsomethinG.old	"Waiting For Something Random (L'orange Mix)"	Maurice Daniel
2016	Journalist 103	Battle For The Hearts And Minds	"Felony"	Guilty Simpson
2016	White Mic & Deuce Eclipse	The Vegetable & The Bandidos	"The Nite B4"	Gel Roc, Equipto & Bambu
2016	rocktee	City of MOWT	"Her Confession"	J. Cole
2017	Rashe Supreme	Amerikkkaz Nightmare	"Legends"	—
2017	ChanHays	Here	"Never Knew"	Supastition & Ambition
2017	Decompoze	Maintain Composure	"Gotta Get It"	Lyric'lee & Kodac
2017	Decompoze	Maintain Composure	"The Breakdown"	Ro Spit
2018	Dox Black & Dkind	Ikiru Riyu	"Live & Direct"	Damien McCray
2018	Zion I & DJ Fresh	The Tonite Show with Zion I	"Vision Quest"	Eligh, Illuminati Congo & DJ Remedy
2018	Blame One	The 34th Scroll	"Frequency"	Blu & Choosey
2018	Last Jazz Club	Jazz Is...	"Unfair Game"	StephanieSoul
2018	Ratchet by Nature	Bodega Cats	"Thoughts and Prayers"	—
2019	Delirious Mindstate	Ikiru Riyu	"Astral Projection"	FYA & On Point
2020	Nino Beige	Letters from the Valley	"HSYTRY"	—
2020	Terry Borderline	Ways of The World	"Breathless"	Cloudyyy & Meaux Muzak
2020	AudioPoet	Missteps to Destiny	"Heavy Harmonix"	—

Note:

- * Includes an interlude featuring Binary Star at the end of the song.

=== On singles ===
Year	Artist	Single	Title	Other featured guests	Format
2001	Athletic Mic League	Lyrictricity	"Lyrictricity"	—	12 Inch Vinyl
2001	Athletic Mic League	Lyrictricity	"Lyrictricity (Remix)"	—	12 Inch Vinyl
2001	Athletic Mic League	Lyrictricity	"Lyrictricity (Acapella)"	—	12 Inch Vinyl
2003	Verbal Kent	Alien Rock b/w Combat, The Remix	"Combat (Clean)"	—	12 Inch Vinyl
2007	cap D	Return Of The Renegade	"The Answer"	—	12 Inch Vinyl
2007	Octane & Illite	Bassline	"Bassline"	Kodac	7 Inch Vinyl
2009	DJ Flip & Freezemaster Slick	Crossroads	"Crossroads (Flip & Freeze Mix)"	Grip Grand & Zion I	CD single
2009	DJ Flip & Freezemaster Slick	Crossroads	"Crossroads (Grip Grand's End of the Rainbow Remix)"	Grip Grand & Zion I	CD single
2009	DJ Flip & Freezemaster Slick	Crossroads	"Crossroads (DJ Buzz Remix)"	Grip Grand & Zion I	CD single
2009	Ro Spit	Detroit Riots	"Detroit Riots"	T3, Buff1, Marv Won, Phatboy Chef, Fat Ray & Fatt Father	MP3
2020	J Santiago	L.L.T.S.D	"L.L.T.S.D"	—	online streaming

== Notes ==
- One Be Lo also goes by the aliases: OneManArmy, Rahlo, The Anonymous, BoyOneDa, Lofat, LoBeOne Kinobi, Teknik, Mr. Hide.
- "One Be Lo" is sometimes listed as: "One.Be.Lo" or "OneBeLo". "OneManArmy" is also occasionally listed as "One Man Army".
