= Ras Kass discography =

This is the discography for American hip hop artist Ras Kass.

== Albums ==
=== Studio albums ===
| Title | Release | Peak chart positions | |
| Title | Release | US | US R&B |
|---|---|---|---|
| Soul on Ice | Released: September 17, 1996; Label: Priority | 169 | 35 |
| Rasassination | Released: September 22, 1998; Label: Priority | 63 | 11 |
| Barmageddon | Released: February 12, 2013; Label: Cre8yte Corporation | — | — |
| Intellectual Property | Released: September 10, 2016; Label: Goon Music | — | — |
| Soul on Ice 2 | Released: September 6, 2019; Label: Mello Music Group | — | — |
| I'm Not Clearing Shvt | Released: October 20, 2020; Label: Blackhouse Records | — | — |
| Leopard Eats Face | Released: February 13, 2026; Label: Soulspazm | — | — |

=== Unreleased albums ===
- Van Gogh (2001) (officially released in 2018)
- Goldyn Chyld (2003) (officially released in 2014)

=== Collaboration albums & EPs ===
- The Horsemen Project (with the HRSMN) (2003)
- Chinese Graffiti (with Jay 211 & Namebrand) (2007)
- A.D.I.D.A.S. (All Day I Dream About Spittin') (with DJ Rhettmatic) (2010)
- The Yellow Snow EP (with Doc Hollywood) (2011)
- Spit No Evil (with Doc Hollywood) (2012)
- Drop No Evil EP (with Louie Rubio) (2013)
- Historic EP (with HRSMN) (2014)
- Blasphemy (with Apollo Brown) (2014)
- Breakfast at Banksy's (with Jack Splash as Semi Hendrix) (2015)
- Jamo Gang EP (with El Gant and J57 as Jamo Gang) (2018)
- Walking with Lions (with Jamo Gang) (2020)
- The Last Ride (with the HRSMN) (2021)
- Long Story Longer (with Yukmouth, Swifty McVay & Mrk Sx) (2021)
- Everything Is...Guttr (with Havoc & RJ Payne) (2024)
- Walkabout Westside EP (with DJ Views) (2024)
- FAFO EP (2025)

=== Compilation albums ===
- Re-Up: The Compilation (2003)
- Razzy Kazzy (2007)
- The Endangered Lyricist (2010)
- The Endangered Lyricist Vol. 2 (2010)
- The Endangered Lyricist Vol. 3 (2011)

=== Mixtapes ===
- Sampler on Ice (Promo Demo Tape) (1996)
- The Van Gogh (Album Preview CD) (Hosted by DJ Doo Wop & DJ Kay Slay) (2001)
- Goldyn Chyld (Album Preview CD) (Hosted by Kid Capri) (2002)
- On the Run (Hosted by DJ Lt. Dan) (2003)
- Run Away Slave Mixtape (Hosted by Tung Ha) (2003)
- Guess Who's Back: Freestyles '05 Vol. 1 (2005)
- Institutionalized (2005)
- Revenge of the Spit (Hosted by DJ Dow Jones) (2006)
- Eat or Die (2006)
- Institutionalized Volume 2 (2008)
- Quarterly (2009)
- Barmageddon: The Mixtape (Hosted by DJ J-Ronin) (2012)
- Barmageddon 2.0 (2014)
- ChristMess (2014)
- Refresher Course (2016)
- Year End Closeout (2017)

== Singles ==
| Year | Single | Peak chart positions | | Album |
| Year | Single | US R&B | US Rap | Album |
|---|---|---|---|---|
| 1994 | "Won't Catch Me Runnin'" / "Remain Anonymous" | — | — | data-sort-value="" style="background: var(--background-color-interactive, #ececec); color: var(--color-base, inherit); vertical-align: middle; text-align: center; " class="table-na" | Non-album single |
| 1996 | "Anything Goes" | 85 | 20 | Soul on Ice |
| 1996 | "Soul on Ice" (Remix) | 82 | 22 | |
| 1998 | "Ghetto Fabulous" (featuring Dr. Dre and Mack-10) | 56 | — | Rasassination |
| 2010 | "Golden Child II" | — | — | A.D.I.D.A.S. |
| 2012 | "Sushi" | — | — | Barmageddon |
"—" denotes a recording that did not chart.

== Guest appearances ==
List of non-single guest appearances, with other performing artists, showing year released and album name
| Title | Year | Other artist(s) | Album |
|---|---|---|---|
| "Come Widdit" | 1994 | Ahmad, Saafir | Street Fighter (1994 soundtrack) |
| "E=MC5 (Bust the Scientifical)" | 1995 | KeyKool & DJ Rhettmatic, LMNO, Voodoo, Meen Green | Kozmonautz |
| "Get Up, Get Down" | 1995 | Coolio, Malika, Shorty, Leek Ratt, P.S., WC | Gangsta's Paradise |
| "Riiiot!" | 1996 | Chino XL | Here to Save You All |
| "Miami Life" | 1996 | —N/a | The Substitute (soundtrack) |
| "Plastic Surgery" | 1996 | Xzibit, Saafir | At the Speed of Life |
| "It Ain't Nothing Nice" | 1996 | DBA Flip | Flip on This |
| "Uni-4-Orm" | 1997 | Heltah Skeltah, Canibus | Rhyme & Reason (soundtrack) |
| "The Ebonic Plague" | 1997 | Cru | Da Dirty 30 |
| "Hit 'Em" | 1997 | Coolio | My Soul |
| "Arch Angels" | 1997 | Xzibit | The Lawhouse Experience, Volume One |
| "Action Guaranteed" | 1998 | O.C. | Lyricist Lounge, Volume One |
| "3 Card Molly" | 1998 | Xzibit, Saafir | 40 Dayz & 40 Nightz |
| "One on One" | 1998 | Kid Capri, Punchline | Soundtrack to the Streets |
| "Handwriting on the Wall" | 1998 | RZA | Bobby Digital in Stereo |
| "Sophisticated Thugs" | 1999 | Bootleg | Death Before Dishonesty |
| "Line on Fire" | 1999 | Domingo, Bamboo, F.T., KRS-One, Godsons, MC Shan | Behind the Doors of the 13th Floor |
| "Play the Cards I Was Given" | 1999 | Mr. Mike | Rhapsody |
| "The 7th" | 1999 | Ice-T, Marc Live, Catastraphe | The Seventh Deadly Sin |
| "Up from da Undaground" | 1999 | KRS-One, Mad Lion, Xzibit | Temple of Hiphop Kulture (Criminal Justice: From Darkness to Light) |
| "All Checks Are Cleared" | 1999 | D.B.A. | Doing Business As... |
| "On Top of the World" | 1999 | Battlecat, Hot B, Skitso G | Gumbo Roots |
| "West Coast Mentality" | 2000 | —N/a | 3 Strikes (soundtrack) |
| "Game" | 2000 | Mystikal | WWF Aggression |
| "La Vida Bloka" | 2000 | Clee & Drank-A-Lot | Good Laaawd That's a Lot of Drank |
| "What Part of the Game?" | 2000 | Killah Priest | View from Masada |
| "Heaven or Grimmripping" | 2000 | IRS | America's Ghettos |
| "Horsementality" | 2000 | Canibus, Killah Priest, Kurupt | 2000 B.C. (Before Can-I-Bus) |
| "Spazz Out" | 2000 | David Banner | Them Firewater Boyz, Vol. 1 |
| "I Gets Paper" | 2000 | Mr. D.O.G | Ghetto Politics |
| "Heart of the Assassin" | 2000 | Chace Infinite, Krondon, Phenam a.k.a. Don Krisis | Soul Assassins II |
| "Bounce, Rock, Golden State" | 2001 | Xzibit, Saafir | Training Day (soundtrack) |
| "2001 4dr. Cadillac" | 2001 | Bad Azz, Sylk-E. Fyne, Butch Cassidy | Personal Business |
| "Bentleys & Bitches" | 2001 | Da Beatminerz, Jayo Felony | Brace 4 Impak |
| "My Bloc" | 2002 | Caz, Kurupt, Roscoe | Goin Head Up |
| "Harder" | 2002 | Xzibit, Saafir | Man Vs. Machine |
| "What Type" | 2003 | 40 Glocc | The Jakal |
| "Rise of the Machines" | 2003 | Jedi Mind Tricks | Visions of Gandhi |
| "Comin' from the Lower Level" | 2004 | CHOPS, Phil Da Agony, Talib Kweli | Virtuosity |
| "Lyrical Swords" | 2005 | GZA | Wu-Tang Meets the Indie Culture |
| "Making the Rounds" | 2005 | Rasco | The Dick Swanson Theory |
| "Introducin" | 2006 | Vakill | Worst Fears Confirmed |
| "Legendary" | 2006 | Mr. D.O.G, Scipio | Backstreets & Boulevards |
| "Flashlight" | 2006 | The Alchemist, 40 Glocc | No Days Off |
| "Musical Murdah" | 2007 | Hell Razah | Renaissance Child |
| "125 Part 3 (Connections)" | 2007 | Joell Ortiz, Stimuli, Grafh, Gab Gacha | The Brick: Bodega Chronicles |
| "Inner G" | 2007 | Killah Priest, Canibus, Kurupt | The Offering |
| "U Ain't Me" | 2007 | Strong Arm Steady, Chamillionaire, Xzibit | Deep Hearted |
| "Killen Em" | 2007 | Cool Nutz | King Cool Nutz |
| "Go Hard" | 2008 | Bishop Lamont, Black Milk, Royce da 5'9" | Caltroit |
| "The Corner" | 2008 | Termanology, Doo Wop, Alias Khryst | Da Cameo King |
| "Payback" | 2008 | Immortal Technique, Diabolic | The 3rd World |
| "Be Cool" | 2008 | Bishop Lamont, Xzibit, Glasses Malone, Mykestro | The Confessional |
| "2010 Wake Up Show Anthem" | 2010 | Sway & King Tech, B-Real, Crooked I, DJ Jazzy Jeff, DJ Qbert, DJ Revolution, Kam Moye, Locksmith, RZA, Tajai, Tech N9ne | —N/a |
| "I Wanna Rock" (West Coast Remix) | 2010 | Snoop Dogg, Daz Dillinger, Kurupt, Crooked I, Nipsey Hussle | —N/a |
| "Catalyst for Change" | 2010 | Truthlive, Finale | Patience |
| "Smoke Sumthin'" | 2010 | Cypress Hill, Kurupt, Young De | Smoke Out Compilation |
| "I Got Mines" | 2010 | Ski Beatz, Tabi Bonney, Nikki Wray, Stalley | 24 Hour Karate School |
| "The Golden Cypher" | 2011 | Canibus, K-Solo | Lyrical Law |
| "The Red Carpet" | 2011 | Evidence, Raekwon | Cats & Dogs |
| "Classical" | 2012 | Planet Asia, Jasiri X | Black Belt Theatre |
| "The Book" | 2012 | KnowMads, La | The KnewBook |
| "Get Up" | 2012 | Oh No, Prince Po | Ohnomite |
| "3 the Hard Way" | 2012 | Crooked I, Kurupt | Psalm 82:v6 |
| "Californication" | 2012 | David Banner, Snoop Dogg, Nipsey Hussle, Kree, The Game | Sex, Drugs & Video Games |
| "What the West Like" | 2012 | Snowgoons, Planet Asia, Krondon | Snowgoons Dynasty |
| "We Should Start a Revolution" | 2013 | Kid Frost, Big Swisha, Big Tank | The Good Man |
| "Play No Games" | 2014 | Shane Dollar, Jesse Taylor, Deep Thawts | —N/a |
| "48 Laws (Part 1)" | 2014 | Apollo Brown | Blasphemy |
| "Eyes Wide Open" | 2015 | Rapper Big Pooh | Words Paint Pictures |
| "We Earned It" | 2015 | DJ EFN, Black Milk, Black Collar, Cory Gunz | Another Time |
| "Enemies with Benefits" | 2015 | Apollo Brown | Grandeur |
| "For the Worst" | 2015 | EDIDON, Bad Lucc | The Hope Dealer, Pt. 1 |
| "Don't Touch That Dial" | 2016 | Apathy, O.C. | Handshakes with Snakes |
| "Gospel of the Worm" | 2016 | Vinnie Paz | The Cornerstone of the Corner Store |
| "Night Night" | 2016 | SuperSTah Sunk, Termanology | Man Of 1,000 Styles |
| "Cold Crush" | 2018 | Ghostface Killah, Chris Rivers, La the Darkman | The Lost Tapes |
| Entourage | 2022 | Truth ft Treach, Large Professor, Ras Kass, Tragedy Khadafi, Joe Fatal | For All Intents and Purposes |
| "it's Up" | 2024 | X-Raided, Kxng Crooked | A Sin in Heaven |
| "100 Proof" | 2024 | Da Beatminerz | Stifled Creativity |
| "Back in Style" | 2024 | Da Beatminerz | Stifled Creativity |
| "Love Is the Message" | 2024 | Rakim, Planet Asia, Sally Green, Snoop Dogg | REB7RTH |
