= Chemistry (disambiguation) =

Chemistry is a branch of physical science, and the study of the substances of which matter is composed.

Chemistry may also refer to:

== Science ==
- Chemistry (word), the history and use of the word
- AP Chemistry, a course offered in the Advanced Placement Program

=== Journals ===
- Chemistry (MDPI journal), published by MDPI
- Chemistry: A European Journal, published by Wiley-VCH on behalf of Chemistry Europe
- Chemistry: An Asian Journal, published by Wiley-VCH on behalf of the Asian Chemical Editorial Society

== Film and television ==
- Chemistry (2009 film), a Malayalam film by Viji Thampi
- Chemistry (serial), a 2010 Pakistani television drama serial that aired on Geo Entertainment
- Chemistry (TV series), a 2011 American erotic comedy/thriller television series that aired on Cinemax
- Chemistry: A Volatile History, a 2010 BBC documentary
- "Chemistry" (Dexter), an episode of the American television series Dexter
- "Chemistry" (The New Batman Adventures), an episode of The New Batman Adventures
- "Chemistry" (Smash), a 2012 episode of Smash

== Music ==
- Chemistry (band), a Japanese R&B duo

=== Albums ===
- Chemistry (Buckshot and 9th Wonder album), 2005
- Chemistry (Kelly Clarkson album), 2023
- Chemistry (Girls Aloud album), 2005
  - Chemistry: The Tour, a 2006 concert tour by Girls Aloud
- Chemistry (Houston Person and Ron Carter album), 2016
- Chemistry (Johnny Gill album), 1985
- Chemistry (Mondo Rock album), 1981
- Chemistry, a 1997 compilation album by Nirvana (UK band)
- Chemistry, a 2004 debut album by Austrian singer zeebee

=== Extended plays ===
- Chemistry (Trouble Maker EP), 2013
- Chemistry (Virtual Riot EP), 2016
- Chemistry (Falz and Simi EP), 2016
- Chemistry, an EP by Stereo Junks, which involved Anzi Destruction
- Chemistry, an EP by Grynch, with One Be Lo

=== Songs ===
- "Chemistry" (Eva Simons song), 2013
- "Chemistry" (Mondo Rock song), 1981
- "Chemistry" (Semisonic song), 2001
- "Chemistry", by Alcazar from Alcazarized, 2003
- "Chemistry", by All Time Low from Last Young Renegade, 2017
- "Chemistry", by Arcade Fire from Everything Now, 2017
- "Chemistry", by Gigi Perez from At the Beach, in Every Life, 2025
- "Chemistry", by Jawbreaker from Dear You, 1995
- "Chemistry", by Kelly Clarkson from Chemistry, 2023
- "Chemistry", by Kiss of Life from Lose Yourself, 2024
- "Chemistry", by the Nolans from Portrait, 1982
- "Chemistry", by Rush from Signals, 1982
- "Chemistry", by Shinee from The Story of Light, 2018
- "Chemistry", by Unkle from War Stories, 2007
- "Chemistry", by Velvet from The Queen, 2007
- "Chemistry", by Who's Who from Ulterior Motives (The Lost Album), 2024

== Other uses ==
- Chemistry.com, an online dating service
- Interpersonal attraction or interpersonal chemistry, a special connection or attraction between people that leads to friendships and romantic relationships
- Chemistry (novel), 2017 novel by Weike Wang

== See also ==
- Chem (disambiguation)
- Chemical (disambiguation)
