= Kill'em All (Vakill album) =

Compilation album by Vakill
- Released: August 2001
- Recorded: 1990–2001
- Genre: Hip hop
- Label: Molemen Records
- Producer: Panik

Vakill chronology
Kill'em All (2001)	The Darkest Cloud (2003)

Kill'em All is a compilation album by Vakill. The album contains tracks encompassing Vakill's rap career from 1990 to 2001.

== Track listing ==
1. "Bye Baby"
2. "Flows You Can't Imagine"
3. "A Chi-Ago '91"
4. "V.A.K.I.L.L."
5. "Check Me Out '95"
6. "Tiz The Seizin' [Original]"
7. "Interlude"
8. "Amen [Original '95]"
9. "Hip Hop Romper Room (Freestyle, Pt. 1)"
  - Featuring Prime, J-Live
10. "Dungeons 2 Rooftops"
11. "Something Terrible '94"
12. "My Heaven, Your Hell"
13. "Am I Dope Or What?"
14. "Out The Speakers"
  - Featuring MC Juice
15. "Amen [Remix '95]"
16. "Tiz The Seizin' [Vinyl version]"
17. "Who's Afraid '95"
18. "Hip Hop Romper Room (Freestyle, Pt. 2)"
  - Featuring Prime, J-Live
