= Soul on Ice =

Soul on Ice can refer to:

== Literature ==
- Soul on Ice (book), a 1968 memoir by Eldridge Cleaver

== Music ==
- Soul On Ice (song) a song from the Ice T album "Power"
- Soul on Ice (album), the debut album by rapper Ras Kass
  - "Soul on Ice" (song), a single from the Ras Kass album
- Souls on Ice, the third and final album by rapper Seagram
- "Soul On Ice", the second track on rapper Ice Cube's album I Am the West

== Film ==
- Soul on Ice (film), a 2016 documentary
