= Ghetto Fabulous =

Ghetto fabulous is a fashion stereotype alluding to individuals living in an affluent materialistic style while not always having any luxurious possessions or wealth.

Ghetto Fabulous may also refer to:

- Ghetto Fabulous (album), a 1998 album by Mystikal
- "Ghetto Fabulous" (song), a 1998 song by Ras Kass
- Ghetto Fabulous, a dance troupe that appeared on The All Ireland Talent Show

== See also ==
- Ghetto Fabolous, the 2001 debut album by Fabolous
