= Joseph Kuhn =

Joseph Kuhn may refer to:

- Joseph E. Kuhn (1864–1935), U.S. Army officer
- Joseph Francis Kuhn (1924–1962), American composer, arranger and conductor

== See also ==
- Joseph Kuhn-Régnier (1873–1940), French illustrator
- Joseph Henry Kuhns (1800–1883), Whig member of the U.S. House of Representatives
