= Sonogram =

Sonogram may refer to:

- S.O.N.O.G.R.A.M., a 2005 album by One Be Lo
- Sonograph, a term used for an audio-frequency spectrogram, a visual representation of the spectrum of frequencies in a sound
- Ultrasonogram, a diagnostic imaging technique based on the application of ultrasound

== See also ==
- Sinogram (disambiguation)
