= Binary Star (hip-hop group) =

American hip hop group

- Origin: Pontiac, Michigan, United States
- Genre: Alternative hip hop
- Years active: 1998–2000, 2002, 2009–2014, 2016–present
- Label: Subterraneous
- Members: One Be Lo; Decompoze
- Past members: Senim Silla

Binary Star is an underground hip-hop duo from Pontiac, Michigan. The duo consists of rapper One Be Lo (also known as OneManArmy), rapper Senim Silla, and producer Decompoze. The pair met in high school and formed the group in 1998 during their time in Hiawatha Correctional Facility.

== History ==
Binary Star's debut effort, Waterworld, was produced on a $500 budget and released in 1999, under the label Terrorist Records. An extensive tour of Michigan followed, as both members of the duo were on parole and were not permitted to leave the state. The purpose behind Waterworld was to raise money to produce a "real album", Masters of the Universe.

Masters of the Universe was essentially a remixed version of Waterworld, but garnered more attention, selling over 20,000 copies. However, Binary Star disbanded shortly thereafter, citing creative differences, though they reunited in 2002 to perform at Middlebury College in Middlebury, Vermont, They toured together again in 2009–10.

In 2013, Binary Star released its first album since Masters of the Universe, a self-titled EP to celebrate the duo's 15th anniversary.

In 2017, One Be Lo released Water World 3 under the Binary Star name, though without Senim Silla's participation. The album instead featured several guests including Mahogany Jones, Mic Phelps, and Malaki. The album was produced by Decompoze, who also produced most of Masters of the Universe, and One Be Lo.

In 2018, One Be Lo released "Lighty / Ears Apart", the group's first double album, and third under the Subterraneous Records label. This is the first feature produced alongside co-producers Autocons and Lil Pfukwa, despite the ardours of medical school. The album also features several guests such as Bre Maa, Gwaii, DMT, Jason Berry among others.

== Discography ==
- Waterworld (1999, Terrorist Records)
- Masters of the Universe (2000, Subterraneous Records)
- Binary Star EP (2013)
- Water World 3 (2017)
- Lighty / Ears Apart (2018, double album)

=== One Be Lo ===
- WaterWorld Too (2001, Subterraneous Records)
- Project: F.E.T.U.S. (2002, Subterraneous Records)
- S.O.N.O.G.R.A.M. (2005, Fat Beats/ Subterraneous Records)
- S.T.I.L.L.B.O.R.N. (2005, Trackezoids/ Subterraneous Records)
- The R.E.B.I.R.T.H. (2007, Subterraneous Records)
- L.A.B.O.R. (2011, Subterraneous Records)
- K.I.C.K. P.U.S.H. (2012, Subterraneous Records)
- 10 G.R.A.M.S. (2015, Subterraneous Records)
- Original Born Ones (2016, Subterraneous Records)
- The LOOMA SINGLE (2019, Subterraneous Records)
- The LOOMA DOUBLE (2019, Subterraneous Records)
- The LOOMA TRIPLE (2019, Subterraneous Records)
- The LOOMA QUADRUPLE (2019, Subterraneous Records)
- The LOOMA QUINTUPLE (2019, Subterraneous Records)
- C Section (2020, Subterraneous Records)
- B.A.B.Y. (2020, Subterraneous Records)
- DUBTERRANEOUS instrumentals (2022, Subterraneous Records)
- This Is How I Represent instrumentals (2022, Subterraneous Records)
- 110 Percent Rocketship instrumentals (2022, Subterraneous Records)
- Songs of Songs (2022, Subterraneous Records)

=== Senim Silla ===
- The Name, The Motto, The Outcome (2007, Infinite Rhythm Network)
