= Worst Fears Confirmed =

Studio album by Vakill
- Released: January 31, 2006
- Genre: Hip-hop
- Length: 52:45
- Label: Molemen Records
- Producer: Molemen, Chemo

Vakill chronology
The Darkest Cloud (2003)	Worst Fears Confirmed (2006)	Armor of God (2011)

Professional ratings
Review scores
Source	Rating
AllHipHop.com	4/5 stars
Allmusic	4.5/5 stars
HipHop11.com	(9.5/10)
HipHopSite.com	3.5/5 stars
Okayplayer	3/5 stars
Prefix	4.5/5 stars

Worst Fears Confirmed is the second album by Chicago rapper Vakill, released January 31, 2006 on Molemen Records. The album comes three years after the rapper's 2003 debut The Darkest Cloud. Like his debut, Worst Fears Confirmed was widely acclaimed by many sources. Allmusic reviewer Jason Ankeny gave the album a 4½ star rating, calling it a "Chicago hip-hop masterpiece" with "dazzling lyrical intelligence" .

The album is produced by Molemen members Panik and Memo and UK producer Chemo, and features guest appearances from Ras Kass, Royce da 5'9" and Vizion.

== Track listing ==
#	Title	Producer(s)	Performer (s)
1	"Intro"	Panik	
2	"Worst Fears Confirmed"	Memo	Vakill
3	"Cold War"	Panik	Vakill
4	"Introducin"	Panik	Vakill, Ras Kass
5	"When Was the Last Time"	Memo	Vakill
6	"Serpent and the Rainbow"	Panik	Vakill
7	"Monstaz Ink"	Panik	Vakill
8	"Farewell to the Game"	Memo	Vakill
9	"No Mercy"	Panik	Vakill
10	"Heart Bleeds"	Panik	Vakill
11	"The Kings Meets the Sickest"	Panik	Vakill, Royce da 5'9"
12	"The Confirmation"	Panik	Vakill
13	"Man into Monster"	Panik	Vakill, Vizion
14	"Flow Fever"	Chemo	Vakill
15	"Acts of Vengeance"	Panik	Vakill
