= The Darkest Cloud =

Studio album by Vakill
- Released: May 5, 2003
- Genre: Hip hop · underground hip hop
- Label: Molemen Records
- Producer: Memo; Panik; DJ Contakt; Mixx Massacre

Vakill chronology
Kill'em All (2001)	The Darkest Cloud (2003)	Worst Fears Confirmed (2006)

Professional ratings
Review scores
Source	Rating
HipHopSite.com	3.5/5 stars
MVRemix.com	8.5/10 stars
Stylus Magazine	B+

The Darkest Cloud is the debut studio album by Chicago rapper Vakill, released May 5, 2003, on Molemen Records. The album came eight years after the rapper's 1995 debut EP Who's Afraid?.

== Production ==
The Darkest Cloud features production from members of The Molemen and guest appearances from Slug (of Atmosphere), Copywrite, Camu Tao, and others. The album's lead single is "End of Days" b/w "Sickplicity" b/w "The Creed".

== Reception ==
The album drew positive reviews from underground hip hop fans and critics alike, with praise for its production and lyricism.

== Track listing ==
#	Title	Producer(s)	Performer (s)
1	"Intro"		*Interlude*
2	"The Darkest Cloud"	Memo	Vakill
3	"The Creed"	Memo	Vakill
4	"Til the World Blows Up"	Panik	Vakill
5	"Sickplicity"	Panik	Vakill
6	"Dear Life"	DJ Contakt	Vakill
7	"Forbidden Scriptures"	Panik	Vakill, Breez Evahflowin, Camu Tao, Copywrite, Jakki Da Motamouth
8	"American Gothic"	Memo	Vakill
9	"Forever"	Panik	Vakill
10	"Fallen"	Panik	Vakill, Slug
11	"Cry You a River"	Mixx Massacre	Vakill
12	"Sweetest Way to Die"	Memo	Vakill
13	"The Crown Don't Move"	Panik	Vakill / Contains sample of "Estábamos Juntos" (1974) by José José
14	"The Flyer"	Panik	Vakill
15	"End of Days"	Panik	Vakill

== Album singles ==
Single information
"End of Days"
- Released: 2003
- B-Side: "Sickplicity", "The Creed"
