= Killing Fields (album) =

Studio album by Molemen
- Released: November 14, 2006
- Genre: Hip hop
- Label: Molemen Records
- Producer: Panik; Memo; PNS

Molemen chronology
Chicago City Limits, Vol. 2 (2006)	Killing Fields (2006)

Professional ratings
Review scores
Source	Rating
Okayplayer	4/5 stars

Killing Fields is an album by the American production trio called the Molemen. The album boasts a wide variety of guests from New York City as well as the midwest.

== Track listing ==
1. "Intro"
  - Performed by DJ Presyce
  - Produced by DJ Presyce
2. "Street Conflict"
  - Performed by Cormega, Hostyle, KL of Screwball
  - Produced by Panik
3. "Life Sentence"
  - Performed by Brother Ali
  - Produced by Memo
4. "Full Metal Jacket"
  - Performed by Kool G. Rap, Mass Hysteria
  - Produced by Panik
5. "Up To Par"
  - Produced by Panik
6. "Provin' Em Wrong"
  - Performed by Rhymefest
  - Produced by Memo
7. "Blackhand Clap"
  - Performed by Grafh
  - Produced by Panik
8. "Vague Ultimatum"
  - Produced by Memo
9. "My Alien Girlfriend"
  - Performed by Murs, Slug
  - Produced by PNS
10. "One Shot, One Kill"
  - Performed by Mike Treese
  - Produced by Memo
11. "2 Hour Banger"
  - Performed by Saigon
  - Produced by Memo
12. "The Come Up"
  - Performed by Juice
  - Produced by Panik
13. "Scarlet Letter"
  - Featuring Casual of Hieroglyphics, Del tha Funkee Homosapien, Virtuoso
  - Produced by Panik
14. "Love Kills War"
  - Produced by PNS
15. "Redemption"
  - Featuring Mikah 9 of Haiku D'Etat
  - Produced by PNS
16. "QB2BK"
  - Featuring Littles, Poison Pen
  - Produced by Memo
17. "V"
  - Performed by Vakill
  - Produced by Panik
