= Kill 'Em All (disambiguation) =

Kill 'Em All is the debut album by American heavy metal band Metallica.

Kill 'Em All also may refer to:

- Kill'em All (Vakill album), a compilation album by Vakill
- Kill 'Em All (film), a 2017 American film starring Jean-Claude Van Damme
- "Kill 'Em All", a song by the American heavy metal band King 810

== See also ==
- Caedite eos. Novit enim Dominus qui sunt eius (often rendered as "Kill them all; let God sort them out"), a command attributed to papal legate Arnaud Amalric, the leader of the Catholic crusade against the Cathars at the siege of Béziers in 1209, by a fellow Cistercian Caesarius of Heisterbach
