= Sinogram =

A Sinogram can be:

- Any Chinese character, one of many logographs used to write several Asian languages
- A medical test that examines a sinus (any open cavity) using contrast media and X-ray imaging
- A visual representation of the raw data obtained in the operation of computed tomography
  - Media related to Sinogram at Wikimedia Commons
- The output of a Radon transform, a type of integral transform in mathematics

Sinograph can mean:

- An X-ray image produced by a medical sinogram (like radiograph)
- (less preferred) Any Chinese character

Sinography can mean:

- the art of making sinograms, the study of sinograms, the art of making sinographs, or the study of sinographs (in context)
- (misnomer) a sinogram
- (misnomer) a sinograph

== See also ==
- Sonogram (disambiguation)
