= Capital D (rapper) =

American underground rapper and lawyer

- Born: David J. Kelly
- Origin: Chicago
- Genres: Underground hip hop
- Years active: 1997-present
- Label: All Natural

David J. Kelly, better known by his stage name Capital D, or just Cap D, is an American underground rapper and lawyer who has served as executive director of the National Basketball Players Association since 2026. He is known for his solo musical work, his collaboration with Tony Fields as the duo All Natural and for founding the label All Natural Records, on which all his music has been released.

== Early life and education ==
Kelly grew up in a Catholic family on the South Side of Chicago, before his family moved to Flossmoor, where he attended Homewood-Flossmoor High School. He later attended Morehouse College (B.A., 1996) and the University of Illinois College of Law. (J.D., 2004).

== Musical career ==
Kelly started the label "All Natural" in 1997, on which he released his first album, Writer's Block (The Movie) with The Molemen, in 2002. He was also a member of a rap group, also called "All Natural", with Tony Fields, aka "Tony B. Nimble", which they started in 1993. This duo intended to release their first single, "50 Years", on the short-lived label Wild Pitch. After this label folded, they started the All Natural label to release "50 Years," and on which they released their debut album, No Additives, No Preservatives, in 1998. Greg Kot praised the album as one of "the year's freshest rap releases" and wrote that "Though it lacks the cinematic production of the best East Coast hip-hop, it marks the arrival of an assertive and unusually insightful new voice in Kelly."

He released his second solo album, Insomnia, in 2004 on the same label, shortly after he received his law degree. Insomnia was noted for its heavily political themes, which led some critics to compare it to Noam Chomsky, and was also highlighted for addressing Kelly's newfound religion of Islam. All Natural's third album, Vintage, was released in 2005 and was also heavily influenced by Kelly's religious views.

Kelly released his third album, Return of the Renegade, as "Cap D" in 2007. He described this album as more for the sake of hip-hop and less of a bold political statement than Insomnia had been. His fourth album, Polymath, was released in 2010, also under the alias of "Cap D". Kot ranked it as the best indie Chicago album of that year.

== Legal career ==
Kelly also formerly worked as a transactional associate at Katten Muchin Rosenman, where he frequently did work for local sports teams such as the Chicago White Sox. He previously served as vice president and general counsel for the Golden State Warriors. In 2026, he was hired as executive director for the National Basketball Players Association.

== Personal life ==
Kelly converted to Islam in 2000. He is married and has three children.

== Discography ==
=== Solo ===
- Writer's Block (the Movie) (with The Molemen) (All Natural, 2002)
- Insomnia (All Natural, 2004)
- (as Cap D) Return of the Renegade (All Natural, 2007)
- (as Cap D) Polymath (All Natural, 2010)

=== With All Natural ===
- Writers' Block (All Natural single, 1997)
- No Additives, No Preservatives (All Natural, 1998)
- Second Nature (All Natural, 2001)
- Vintage (All Natural, 2005)
- Elements (Fire) (All Natural, 2008)
- Dark Night (All Natural & Panik, 2020)
