= Buff1 =

American rapper

Jamall Bufford
- Also known as: Buff1
- Born: Jamall Jernard Bufford; Atlanta, Georgia, U.S.
- Origin: Ann Arbor, Michigan, U.S.
- Genres: Hip hop
- Occupation: Rapper
- Years active: 2000–present
- Labels: A-Side Worldwide; Lab Technicians Productions; Mello Music Group
- Website: Twitter

Jamall Jernard Bufford (born in southwest Atlanta, Georgia), formerly known as by his stage name Buff1, is an American rapper and songwriter from Ann Arbor, Michigan. He is a member of Ann Arbor-based rap crew Athletic Mic League (with 14KT, Grand Cee, Mayer Hawthorne, Sonny Star, Vaughan T, Vital) since 2000, with whom he released three studio albums from 2000 to 2004 via Lab Technicians Productions. He is currently managed by Mello Music Group. In 2005 he started his solo career and released his debut album Pure in 2007, which was called "incredible" and "classic" by Okayplayer. Pure includes features from notable Michigan hip hop acts, including Guilty Simpson, Elzhi, Invincible, One Be Lo, and Monica Blaire as well as production from the Lab Techs, Mr. Porter, and Waajeed. In 2010, Bufford and DJ Rhettmatic released a collaborative self-titled project, Crown Royale, and went a nationwide tour with Mayer Hawthorne. He quits using his Buff1 moniker and dropped his third solo full-length in 2013 under his real name. The same year, he formed and runs rap performing arts group The Black Opera along with many other artists.

== Accolades ==
Based on his presence in Michigan's hip hop scene and the critical response to his album Pure, Real Detroit Weekly named Jamall Bufford the Best Solo Rap Artist of 2007. Bufford is listed on URB Magazine's Next 100 (acts to look out for nationally) for 2009. In 2013 Jamall was named one of the Top 25 Artists of 2013 by OK-Tho.com.

== There's Only One ==
After a tour for his first album, he started working on and soon released his second full-length LP, There's Only One. URB Magazine's review called the production "a lengthy album without weakness". For There's Only One, Bufford enlisted help from producers, including Black Milk, and Zo! as well as AML cohorts 14KT and the Lab Techs. Features on the album include Mayer Hawthorne a.k.a. DJ Haircut, DJ Rhettmatic, and Black Milk.

== Touring ==
Bufford has shared the stage with some of the biggest acts in hip hop (Eminem, Mos Def, De La Soul, Slum Village, Jurassic 5, Dead Prez, Talib Kweli, Little Brother and Ghostface Killah), and has toured extensively throughout Europe, and the U.S.

== Discography ==
=== Solo ===
==== Studio albums ====
- 2007: Pure (album)
- 2008: There's Only One (album)
- 2013: Victim Of A Modern Age (album)
- 2018: Time in Between Thoughts (album)

==== Mixtapes ====
- 2005: The One And Only Mixtape
- 2006: Small City, Big Name
- 2009: It's A 1derful Life

=== Collaborative albums ===
- 2000: The Thrill Is Gone (with Athletic Mic League)
- 2002: Sweats And Kicks (with Athletic Mic League)
- 2004: Jungle Gym Jungle (with Athletic Mic League)
- 2010: Crown Royale (with DJ Rhettmatic as Crown Royale)
- 2015: Freedom Is (with Kensaye as part of The Black Opera)
- 2016: African America (with The Black Opera)
