= Rasassination =

Studio album by Ras Kass
- Released: September 22, 1998
- Recorded: 1997−98
- Studio: Stu's Kennel; Audio X Recording Studios (Burbank, CA); Enterprise Recordings (Burbank, CA); PatchWerk Recording Studios (Atlanta, GA); Henchmen Recording Studio (New York, NY); Echo Sound (Los Angeles, CA); Creator's Way Recording Studio (Chicago, IL); Unique Recording Studios (New York, NY)
- Length: 1:12:20
- Label: Priority
- Producer: Big Jaz; Easy Mo Bee; Flip; Klev; Ras Kass; Stu-B-Doo; Toxic; Twelve

Ras Kass chronology
Soul on Ice (1996)	Rasassination (1998)	The Horsemen Project (2003)

Singles from Rasassination
- 1. "Ghetto Fabulous" Released: February 27, 1998

Professional ratings
Review scores
Source	Rating
AllMusic	4/5 stars
RapReviews	5.5/10
The Source	3/5 stars

Rasassination is the second studio album by American rapper Ras Kass. It was released on September 22, 1998, via Priority Records. Recording sessions took place at Stu's Kennel, at Audio X Recording Studios and Enterprise Recordings in Burbank, at PatchWerk Recording Studios in Atlanta, at Henchmen Recording Studio and Unique Recording Studios in New York, at Echo Sound in Los Angeles, and at Creator's Way Recording Studio in Chicago. Production was handled by Stu-B-Doo, Klev, Easy Mo Bee, Flip, Jaz-O, Toxic, Twelve, and Ras Kass himself. It features guest appearances from Bad Azz, Dr. Dre, El Drex, Jah-Skillz, Jazze Pha, Kurupt, Mack 10, Phil Da Agony, RZA, Saafir, Twista and Xzibit. The album peaked at number 63 on Billboard 200 and number 11 on the Top R&B/Hip-Hop Albums in the United States. Its only single, "Ghetto Fabulous", made it to number 56 on the US Billboard Hot R&B/Hip-Hop Songs.

== Track listing ==
No.	Title	Writer(s)	Producer(s)	Length
1.	"Endtro"	John Austin	Stu-B-Doo; Ras Kass	1:47
2.	"Rasassination"	Austin; Stuart Bullard	Stu-B-Doo	4:33
3.	"Ghetto Fabulous" (featuring Dr. Dre and Mack 10)	Austin; Andre Young; Dedrick Rolison; Bullard; Joseph Francis Kuhn	Stu-B-Doo	4:30
4.	"Lapdance" (featuring R.C.)	Austin; Ruben Cruz; Bullard; Philip Johnson; David Wolinski	Stu-B-Doo	4:34
5.	"Skit #1"			0:47
6.	"Conceited Bastard"	Austin; Jimmy Juarez	Klev; Ras Kass	4:14
7.	"Ice Age" (featuring Kurupt and El Drex)	Austin; Ricardo Brown; G. Eldridge; L. Mallory	Twelve	4:39
8.	"...In a Coogi Sweatsuit" (Skit)			1:57
9.	"H2O Proof" (featuring Saafir)	Austin; Jonathan Burks	Big Jaz	4:21
10.	"It Is What It Is" (featuring Jazze Pha)	Austin; Juarez; Monte Moir	Klev; Ras Kass	4:57
11.	"Interview with a Vampire" (featuring God and Satan)	Austin; Juarez	Klev; Ras Kass	6:56
12.	"Wild Pitch" (featuring Xzibit, Jah Skillz and Phil da Agony)	Austin; Alvin Joiner; Jamali Carthorn; Jason Smith; Bullard	Stu-B-Doo	4:18
13.	"OohWee!"	Austin; Juarez; Rolison; Delmar Arnaud; Brown; Priest Brooks; Kevin McCord	Klev	4:01
14.	"All or Nuthin'" (featuring Twista)	Austin; Carl Mitchell; Frederick Taylor	Toxic	3:57
15.	"Grindin'" (featuring Bad Azz)	Austin; Osten Harvey	Easy Mo Bee	3:46
16.	"I Ain't Fuckin' With You"	Austin; Michael Winfree	Flip	4:40
17.	"Get at Me"	Austin; Winfree	Flip	4:08
18.	"The End" (featuring RZA)	Austin; Robert Diggs; Harvey	Easy Mo Bee	4:16
Total length:				1:12:20

Sample credits

- Track 3 contains a sample from "Kiev Evening" written and performed by Joseph Francis Kuhn.
- Track 4 contains re-played elements from "Do You Love What You Feel?" written by David Wolinski.
- Track 10 contains elements and excerpts from "If You Were Here Tonight" written by Monte Moir and performed by Alexander O'Neal.
- Track 13 contains a sample and excerpts from "Nothin' But the Cavi Hit" written by Dedrick Rolison, Delmar Arnaud, Ricardo Brown and Priest Brooks, and a sample from "Mr. Groove" written by Kevin McCord and performed by One Way.

== Personnel ==
- John "Ras Kass" Austin – vocals, producer (tracks: 1, 6, 10, 11), associate producer
- Richard Vick – additional vocals (track 2)
- Andre "Dr. Dre" Young – vocals (track 3)
- Dedrick "Mack 10" Rolison – vocals (track 3)
- Rueben "RC" Cruz – vocals (track 4)
- Barima "Bleu Davinci" McKnight – additional vocals (track 6)
- Ricardo "Kurupt" Brown – vocals (track 7)
- G. "El-Drex" Eldridge – vocals (track 7)
- Reggie "Saafir" Gibson – vocals (track 9)
- Phalon "Jazze Pha" Alexander – vocals (track 10)
- Alvin "Xzibit" Joiner – vocals (track 12)
- Jamali "Jah-Skillz" Carthorn – vocals (track 12)
- Jason "Phil Da Agony" Smith – additional vocals (track 12)
- Curtis Daniels – additional vocals (track 13)
- Carl "Twista" Mitchell – vocals (track 14)
- Jamarr "Bad Azz" Stamps – vocals (track 15)
- Da Nation – additional vocals (track 15)
- Karida Johnson – additional vocals (track 17)
- Robert "RZA" Diggs – vocals (track 18)
- Carl "Butch" Small – percussion (tracks: 2, 17)
- Nazareth "DJ Rhettmatic" Nirza – scratches (track 2)
- L. "Twelve" Mallory – scratches (track 9), producer (track 7)
- Stewart "Stu-B-Doo" Bullard – keyboards (tracks: 10, 11), producer (tracks: 1–4, 12), recording (tracks: 2–4, 12), mixing (tracks: 2–4, 6, 7, 9, 11–13, 16, 17)
- Jimmy "Klev" Juarez – producer (tracks: 6, 10, 11, 13), mixing (tracks: 6, 10)
- Jonathan "Big Jaz" Burks – producer & arranger (track 9)
- Frederick "Toxic" Taylor – producer & recording (track 14)
- Osten "Easy Mo Bee" Harvey Jr. – producer & mixing (tracks: 15, 18)
- Michael "Flip" Winfree – producer (tracks: 16, 17), recording (track 16)
- Sean Freehill – recording (tracks: 2–4, 7, 9, 12, 13, 17), mixing (tracks: 6, 9, 12, 13)
- Michael "Mykill" Calderon – recording (tracks: 3, 11, 18)
- Richard "Segal" Huredia – recording (track 3)
- Jen Monnar – recording (track 4), mixing (tracks: 2–4, 11)
- Mike Wilson – recording (tracks: 6, 10, 11, 13)
- Brian Stanley – recording (track 9)
- Eric Lynch – recording & mixing (tracks: 15, 18)
- Jay Gonzalez – recording (track 15)
- Josh Butler – mixing (tracks: 6, 7, 10, 16, 17)
- Samuel "The Legendary Traxster" Lindley – mixing (track 14)
- Josh Chervokas – mixing (track 18)
- Kevin Kim – recording assistant (track 4)
- Brian "Big Bass" Gardner – mastering
- BJ Kerr – executive producer, A&R
- Bob Whitfield – executive producer
- Manuel J. Donayre – art direction, design
- Art Shoji – art direction
- Michael S. Miller – photography
- Laura Giles – project coordinator
- Nancie Stern – sample clearance
- Mark Brown – A&R
- Terry Corbett – stylist

== Charts ==
Chart (1998)	Peak position
US Billboard 200	63
US Top R&B/Hip-Hop Albums (Billboard)	11
