= Anything Goes (Ras Kass song) =

Single by Ras Kass

from the album Soul on Ice
- B-side: "On Earth As It Is..."
- Released: July 16, 1996
- Recorded: 1995
- Genre: Hip hop
- Length: 5:48
- Label: Priority
- Songwriter: John Austin IV
- Producers: Lamont "Bird" Holdby; Ras Kass

Ras Kass singles chronology
"Won't Catch Me Runnin'" (1994)	"Anything Goes" (1996)	"Soul on Ice Remix" (1996)

"Anything Goes" is the first single released from Ras Kass' debut album, Soul on Ice. Produced and written by Ras Kass himself, "Anything Goes" peaked at 20 on the Hot Rap Singles and #1 on the Bubbling Under R&B/Hip-Hop Songs.

== Single track listing ==
1. "Anything Goes" (Radio)
2. "Anything Goes" (LP Version)
3. "Anything Goes" (Instrumental)
4. "On Earth As It Is..." (Radio)
5. "On Earth As It Is..." (LP Version)
6. "On Earth As It Is..." (Xplicit A Capella)
7. "Anything Goes" (Radio A Capella)

== Charts ==
Chart	Position
U.S. Hot Rap Singles	20
