= Waterworld (Binary Star album) =

Studio album by Binary Star
- Released: 1999
- Recorded: Logic Sound Studio, Michigan
- Genre: Hip hop
- Length: 73:03
- Label: Terrorist Records
- Producer: Trackezoids

Binary Star chronology
Waterworld (1999)	Masters of the Universe (2000)

Professional ratings
Review scores
Source	Rating
Allmusic	link
RapReviews	link

Waterworld is the debut album from Michigan hip hop duo Binary Star. The album was self-released, with only 1,000 copies printed. A rearranged, remixed version was created the following year, Masters of the Universe, with wider distribution.

The entire album was recorded, mixed and mastered on a $500 budget. Consequently, all verses were recorded in one take.

== Track listing ==
#	Title	Producer(s)	Performer (s)
1	"Intro"	Trackezoids	OneManArmy, Senim Silla
2	"New Hip Hop"	Trackezoids	OneManArmy, Senim Silla
3	"Reality Check"	Trackezoids	OneManArmy, Senim Silla
4	"Freakin Flowz"	Trackezoids	Decompoze, OneManArmy
5	"Binary Shuffle"	Trackezoids	OneManArmy, Senim Silla
6	"Dat Fast Food Joint"	Trackezoids	OneManArmy, Senim Silla
7	"Conquistadors"	Trackezoids	OneManArmy, Senim Silla
8	"Fellowship"	Trackezoids	OneManArmy, Senim Silla, Athletic Mic League, Decompoze
9	"Slang Blade"	Trackezoids	Senim Silla
10	"Indy 500"	Trackezoids	Decompoze
11	"The Evolution Of Man"	Trackezoids	OneManArmy, Brenda J
12	"What It's All About"	Trackezoids	OneManArmy, Decompoze
13	"Glen Close"	Trackezoids	OneManArmy
14	"Honest Expression"	Trackezoids	OneManArmy, Senim Silla
15	"Wolf Man Jack"	Trackezoids	OneManArmy, Senim Silla
16	"One Man Army"	Trackezoids	OneManArmy
17	"The KGB"	Trackezoids	Malaki, Senim Silla, Texture, Elzhi, O-Type, Lacks, OneManArmy, J.U.I.C.E.
