= One Be Lo =

American rapper (born 1976)

- Also known as: OneManArmy; Nahshid Sulaiman; General Subliminal; Mr. Hyde; The Anonymous
- Born: Raland Scruggs; November 7, 1976 (age 49)
- Origin: Pontiac, Michigan
- Genres: Alternative hip hop
- Occupation: Rapper
- Years active: 1998–present
- Labels: The NEWPRINT, MYX Music, Subterraneous, Fat Beats

Nahshid Sulaiman (born Raland Scruggs; November 7, 1976), better known by his stage name One Be Lo, is an alternative hip hop artist from Pontiac, Michigan. He is well respected for being one half of the rap duo Binary Star, and has released a number of well-received solo albums. He is a member of Massive Monkees, a world-champion B-boy crew.

== Biography ==
Lo was born in Pontiac, Michigan, where his mother worked as a beautician and his stepfather worked at a plant. His parents divorced when he was 14 years old and Lo ran the streets with older youth until he went to prison when he was 18. While in prison, One Be Lo read extensively and converted to Islam. He and Senim Silla formed the rap group Binary Star while in prison.

== Music career ==
=== Binary Star ===
Upon Lo's release, in 1998 he formed the hip-hop group Binary Star with Senim Silla, and they hit the ground running. On their self-released debut Waterworld, they teamed up with future staples like Elzhi, J.U.I.C.E. and Athletic Mic League to exercise creative concepts and deliver substantial messages. Lo formed a production team with Decompoze, who he had recorded with in high school. Binary Star quickly sold out of their initial 1,000 copies as the album was praised as an "instant classic." Though Lo had intended to rhyme anonymously as a solo act to revert attention to the music, he was often addressed as OneManArmy because of a line he used in a song. Lo added extra Senim Silla verses and new songs to a Waterworld re-release entitled Masters of the Universe in 2000, and continued to focus on touring with Subterraneous and recording several albums’ worth of new music.

He and Senim Silla would later go their separate ways, with Lo citing "creative differences" as the main reason for their split.

In 2011, Binary Star's official Myspace page stated that, "Recently reuniting after a 10-year hiatus, Binary Star is back in the studio working on its long awaited follow-up to the classic debut album Masters of the Universe (M.O.T.U.). Tentatively titled Light Years Apart, the duo's EP serves as a mere prequel to a full-length LP." The duo released an EP in 2013, however renaming the title to Binary Star (15 Year Anniversary Edition).

=== Solo career ===
In January 2000, Lo created Subterraneous Records. A year later, Subterraneous Records released WaterWorld Too, a compilation featuring a number of artists from the label's roster. In the meantime, he continued to work on his solo material with producer Decompoze. In late 2002, One Be Lo decided to press limited copies of Project F.E.T.U.S. (a backronym for "For Everybody That Under Stands"), a collection of songs that were not initially intended for release.

=== 2005: S.O.N.O.G.R.A.M. and S.T.I.L.L.B.O.R.N. ===
After the success of Project F.E.T.U.S, the disc sold thousands of copies, he would later complete his next project titled S.O.N.O.G.R.A.M. (Sounds Of Nahshid Originate Good Rhymes And Music). He approached Fat Beats Records to press a single to help promote the album, and they gave him a different offer.

They asked me to send them the song I was thinking about using for the single, and I was like, "If they're doing the 12-inch, I'll let them pick the song." So I just sent them the whole album ...They hit me back like, "We don't want to do a 12-inch. We want to do the whole album."

Lo signed with Fat Beats for distribution in 2003, and the label asked him to change his name from OneManArmy to avoid legal troubles with a similarly named punk band. He changed his name to OneBeLo since he had used that with F.E.T.U.S. He would later go to Mecca, Saudi Arabia on Hajj, an Islamic tradition to find one's self. Meanwhile, Fat Beats pushed back S.O.N.O.G.R.A.M. until 2005. S.O.N.O.G.R.A.M. featured a number of fellow Michigan rappers such as Abdus Salaam and singer Ka Di. The album was critically acclaimed and sold about 12,000 copies within Lo's first few weeks on tour. Many praised One Be Lo for his conscious and intelligent lyrics.

With two projects in tow, Lo landed tours and major festivals, rocking 160 shows per year between 2005 and 2007. In American Pie 6, this album is on the wall of the principal actor, Erik Stifler.

=== 2007: The R.E.B.I.R.T.H. ===
Lo moved his family to Egypt to expose them to a non-American perspective. Once he saw personnel changes at Fat Beats when he arrived back years later, he worked his way out of his deal and self-released The R.E.B.I.R.T.H. (Real Emcees Bring Intelligent Rhymes To Hip-Hop). The R.E.B.I.R.T.H. symbolizes several turning points in OneBeLo's life. He recorded the album after the death of his daughter.

Lo collaborated with beatmakers like Lab Techs, Jake One, Memo (of the Molemen), and others. Rather than use his previous method of recording as many songs as possible and compiling what he thought were the best songs, he decided to sit down and focus on one piece of work. That piece was entitled B.A.B.Y. (Being A Black Youth).

=== 2008: B.A.B.Y. ===
Much of the album, which features the likes of Freeway, Phonte (of Little Brother), Devin The Dude, Guilty Simpson, Royce da 5'9", Zion I, Akir, and others, was lost when thieves broke in and stole studio equipment. Additionally, the label he had signed with, MYX, dissolved before the record could drop.

=== 2011: L.A.B.O.R. ===
L.A.B.O.R. (Language Arts Based On Reality) takes metaphorical inspiration from animals and occupations. The bulk of production comes from D Will of Kansas City, 14KT, Nick Speed and Vitamin D. L.A.B.O.R. also showcases the musicianship of One Be Lo's fellow Pontiac natives David "DMT" Vied (guitar), Derek "The Tyrant" Caraway (keyboard) and Detroit's Emily Rogers (bass).

=== 2015: The NEWPRINT ===
One Be Lo announced on July 19, 2015 that he has signed with the record label group "The NEWPRINT".

== Rap style ==
One Be Lo has crafted himself into what he describes as "the MC's MC". He is often praised for his clear delivery, precise rapping style and conscious lyrics, especially from fans of alternative hip hop. This was noted by Allmusic in their review of S.O.N.O.G.R.A.M., saying:

"One Be Lo is a deep thinker; the details and complex wordplay within his rhymes often take several plays to fully comprehend and appreciate. Similar in effect to X-Clan's Brother J, his words can be righteous, but they're always delivered with casual assurance, like he's talking to an acquaintance at a bus stop. He observes with the wisdom of a father who's been through prison, raises a lot of issues, has almost as many solutions, and never sounds overbearing or preachy."

== Discography ==
=== Binary Star ===
- Waterworld – 1999
- Masters of the Universe – 2000
- Binary Star EP (15 Year Anniversary Edition) – 2013
- Masters of the Universe (MOTU) (re-release) – 2016
- Water World 3 – 2017
- LIGHTY – 2018
- EARS APART – 2018

=== Solo ===
- WaterWorld Too – 2001
  - "Subterraneous"
- Project: F.E.T.U.S. – 2002
  - For Everybody That UnderStands
  - "OneBeLo" (later "OneBeLo aka OneManArmy")
- S.O.N.O.G.R.A.M. – 2005
  - Sounds Of Nahshid Originate Good Rhymes And Music
  - "One.Be.Lo also known as OneManArmy of Binary Star"
- S.T.I.L.L.B.O.R.N. – 2005
  - Something To Interest Lo Listeners Beyond Original Recorded Networkings; or
  - Subterraneous/Trackezoids Invest Lost Lyrics Bringing Old Rhymes New
  - "One Be Lo & DJ Scene"
- Project F.E.T.U.S. (2CD Re-Issue) – 2007
  - For Everybody That UnderStands
  - "OneManArmy"
- The R.E.B.I.R.T.H. – 2007
  - Real Emcees Bring Intelligent Rhymes To Hip-Hop
  - "One Be Lo aka One Man Army"
- L.A.B.O.R. – 2011
  - Language Arts Based On Reality
  - "One Be Lo Soundtrack"
- K.I.C.K. P.U.S.H. – 2012
  - Keep It Cool Kid People Usually Show Hate
  - "One Be Lo Starring as Rahlo"
- C-S.E.C.T.I.O.N. – 2020
  - Court Side Experiences Craft The Imagination Of Nashid
  - "One Be Lo"
- B.A.B.Y. – 2020
  - Being A Black Youth
  - "One Be Lo"

=== Official Mixtapes ===
- S.T.I.L.L.B.O.R.N. – 2005
- Laborhood Part 1 – 2011
- Laborhood Part 2 – 2011
- Laborhood Part 3 – 2012
- Laborhood Part 4 – 2015
- 10 G.R.A.Ms – 2015
- The Original Born Ones – 2016
- Laborhood Part 5 – 2017
