= Chemical (disambiguation) =

A chemical substance is a material with a specific chemical composition. In everyday language, often only synthetic and refined chemicals (as produced by the chemical industry) might be understood as chemicals.

Chemical may also refer to:

- Chemical industry
- Chemical element
- Chemical warfare
- Drug, any substance that, when absorbed into the body of a living organism, alters normal bodily function
- Chemistry, relating to the science of matter and the changes it undergoes

== In music ==
=== Artists ===
- The Chemical Brothers, a British electronic duo
- My Chemical Romance, an American rock band

=== Albums ===
- Chemicals (Smile Empty Soul album), 2013

=== EPs ===
- Chemicals (EP), a 2012 EP by Love and Death

=== Songs ===
- "Chemical" (Crashdïet song), 2010
- "Chemical" (Joseph Arthur song), 2000
- "Chemical" (MK song), 2021
- "Chemical" (Post Malone song), 2023
- "Chemicals" (Love and Death song), 2013
- "Chemicals" (Tiësto and Don Diablo song), 2015
- "Chemicals" (Dean Lewis song), 2018
- "Chemical", by New Order from Republic, 1993
- "Chemical", by No One from No One, 2001
- "Chemicals", by Kasabian from The Alchemist's Euphoria, 2022
- "Chemicals", by Peking Duk featuring Sarah Aarons, 2021
- "Chemicals", by Scars on Broadway from Scars on Broadway, 2008
- "Chemicals", by the Vamps from Cherry Blossom, 2020
