= Institutionalized Vol. 2 =

Institutionalized Volume 2

Mixtape by Ras Kass
- Released: August 5, 2008
- Genre: West Coast hip hop
- Label: Babygrande Records Koch
- Producer: Tony Roc; Ski; Frequency; Sega; Domingo; Da Riffs; Blue Sky Black Death; Mr. Lepht

Ras Kass chronology
Chinese Graffiti (2007)	Institutionalized Volume 2 (2008)	Quarterly (2009)

Professional ratings
Review scores
Source	Rating
RapReviews.com	link
IGN	link

Institutionalized Volume 2 is Ras Kass' mixtape, commercially released by Babygrande Records.

== Track listing ==
#	Title	Producer(s)	Featured Performer (s)	Length
1	"Victory (We Shall Overcome)"	Tony Roc		2:37
2	"Eyes Dont Lie"	Ski		3:09
3	"Im All That"	Frequency		2:48
4	"Capital"			0:29
5	"Behind The Musick"	Tony Roc		4:48
6	"We Go In"	Tony Roc		3:47
7	"Ironman Thug"	Sega		2:31
8	"The Call"			0:26
9	"John Is Real"	Domingo & Tony Roc		4:35
10	"B.I.B.L.E."	Da Riffs		5:22
11	"Ups & Downs"	Da Riffs	Proof	3:51
12	"Elevate"	Blue Sky Black Death	Crooked I, Odious	4:40
13	"Try Me"	Mr. Lepht		5:25
14	"What It Might Be"	Tony Roc	Wais P	3:09
15	"I Just" (Bonus Track)	Sega	Namebrand	4:39
16	"M.V.P." (Bonus Track)	Sega	Namebrand	3:39

=== Bonus tracks ===
Bonus tracks
No.	Title	Length
15.	"I Just (Feat. Namebrand)" (Produced by Sega)	4:39
16.	"M.V.P. (Feat. Namebrand)" (Produced by Sega)	3:39

== Samples ==
John Is Real

- "Im A Hustla" by Cassidy

B.I.B.L.E.

- "He's Working It Out for You" by Shirley Caesar

Ups & Downs

- "(I Just) Died in Your Arms" by Cutting Crew
- "I Need Love" by LL Cool J
