= Soul on Ice (song) =

Single by Ras Kass

from the album Soul on Ice
- B-side: "Marinatin'"
- Released: November 26, 1996
- Recorded: 1996
- Genre: Hip hop
- Length: 4:19
- Label: Priority; EMI Records
- Songwriter: John Austin IV
- Producer: Lamont "Bird" Holdby

Ras Kass singles chronology
"Anything Goes" (1996)	"Soul on Ice" (1996)	"Ghetto Fabulous" (1998)

"Soul on Ice" is the second single released from Ras Kass' debut album, Soul on Ice. Produced by Lamont "Bird" Holdby, "Soul on Ice" became Ras Kass' most successful single chartwise, gaining the most success on the Hot Rap Singles chart, where it peaked at 22. Diamond D of D.I.T.C. remixed the song.

== Single track listing ==
1. "Soul on Ice Remix" (Clean)- 4:53
2. "Soul on Ice Remix" (Explicit)- 4:19
3. "Soul on Ice Remix" (Instrumental)- 4:18
4. "Marinatin'" (Clean)- 4:05
5. "Marinatin'" (Explicit)- 4:05
6. "Marinatin'" (Instrumental)- 4:05

== Charts ==
Chart	Position
Hot Rap Singles	22
Hot Dance Music/Maxi-Singles Sales	39
