= Ghetto Fabulous (song) =

Single by Ras Kass featuring Dr. Dre and Mack 10

from the album Rasassination
- B-side: "H2O Proof"
- Released: February 27, 1998
- Genre: Hip hop
- Length: 4:45
- Label: Priority
- Songwriters: John Austin; Andre Young; Dedrick Rolison; Bullard; Joseph Francis Kuhn
- Producer: Stu-B-Doo

Ras Kass singles chronology
"Soul on Ice Remix" (1996)	"Ghetto Fabulous" (1998)	"Goldyn Child II" (2010)

Dr. Dre singles chronology
"Been There, Done That" (1996)	"Ghetto Fabulous" (1998)	"Zoom" (1998)

Mack 10 singles chronology
"Only in California" (1997)	"Ghetto Fabulous" (1998)	"Let the Games Begin" (1998)

Music video
- "Ghetto Fabulous" on YouTube

"Ghetto Fabulous" is the lead single released from Ras Kass second album, Rasassination. Produced by Stu-B-Doo, the song featured a verse from Dr. Dre and a chorus by Mack 10. Though "Ghetto Fabulous" had a more commercial sound to it than his previous singles, it was not a commercial success, only making it to 56 on Hot R&B/Hip-Hop Singles & Tracks. The video also features Ice-T.

On the B-side was the song "H2O Proof", produced by Big Jaz and featuring Saafir, a member of the "Golden State Project" rap group alongside Xzibit and Ras Kass.

The outro of the video mix version of "Been There, Done That" by Dr. Dre is sampled in Ghetto Fabulous.

== Track listing ==
No.	Title	Producer(s)	Length
1.	"Ghetto Fabulous (Explicit)" (featuring Dr. Dre and Mack 10)	Stu-B-Doo	4:45
2.	"Ghetto Fabulous (Instrumental)"	Stu-B-Doo	4:45
3.	"Ghetto Fabulous (Clean)" (featuring Dr. Dre and Mack 10)	Stu-B-Doo	4:45
4.	"H2O Proof (Explicit)" (featuring Saafir)	Big Jaz	4:25
5.	"H2O Proof (Instrumental)"	Big Jaz	4:25
6.	"H2O Proof (Clean)" (featuring Saafir)	Big Jaz	4:04

== Charts ==
Chart (1998)	Peak position
US Hot R&B/Hip-Hop Songs (Billboard)	56
