= Senim Silla =

American rapper)

- Born: Ross Rowe
- Origin: Aurora, Colorado, U.S.
- Genres: Hip-hop
- Years active: 1988–2014
- Labels: Infinite Rhythm Network; Sleeper Cell Records
- Member of: Binary Star

Ross Rowe, known professionally as Senim Silla ("all is mines" spelled backwards), is an American hip-hop artist from Pontiac, Michigan, best known as one of the two MCs in rap duo Binary Star, along with One Be Lo.

Senim Silla co-hosted the Foreally Show with lifelong friend and Shade 45 DJ Rude Jude.

As of March 2014, Senim Silla is retired from music.

== Discography ==
=== Binary Star ===
- Waterworld (1999)
- Masters of the Universe (2000)
- Binary Star EP (2013)

=== Solo ===
- The Name, The Motto, The Outcome (2007)

=== Other ===
- Peace or Piece (with Naaman Norris and Malaki The Most Hi; 2005)
