= Masters of the Universe (Binary Star album) =

Studio album by Binary Star
- Released: October 31, 2000
- Genre: Alternative hip hop
- Length: 72:37
- Label: Subterraneous Records
- Producer: Trackezoids

Binary Star chronology
Waterworld (1999)	Masters of the Universe (2000)	Light Years Apart (2012)

Masters of the Universe is the second and final studio album from American hip hop duo Binary Star (Senim Silla & One Be Lo), released on October 31, 2000. The release is largely a remixed and rearranged version of their 1999 debut Waterworld. The album was one of the most acclaimed underground hip hop releases of 2000, though it only sold around 20,000 copies.

Masters of the Universe was re-released on July 25, 2006 by Infinite Rhythm Network.

== Critical reception ==
Professional ratings
Review scores
Source	Rating
AllMusic	4.5/5 stars
RapReviews.com	9/10

In a review for AllMusic, Brad Mills wrote that the album has "everything a great hip-hop album requires, with varied beats, differing rhyme deliveries, and content you'll find yourself thinking about long after it's been said." He rated the album 4.5 out of 5 stars, and noted that "without huge marketing budget from a major label, this album will probably fail to reach the level of success it deserves." At RapReviews, Steve Juon rated the album 9 out of 10, and argued the album "represents everything that's right about underground hip-hop... Very few albums that come out are as well conceived or prepared as "Masters of the Universe" – which proves exactly why the title of Binary Star's national debut is truly apt." In a 2014 "Album of the Week" for Bonus Cut, Daniel Hodgman wrote that the album was an "aggressive mix of raw underground hip-hop and self-conscious lyricism... Most of what makes Masters of the Universe pleasing is its relentless punchlines, vast lyrical depth and succinct production as an underground hit.

== Track listing ==
#	Title	Producer(s)	Performer (s)
1	"Reality Check"	OneManArmy	OneManArmy, Senim Silla
2	"Conquistadors"	Decompoze	OneManArmy, Senim Silla
3	"Solar Powered (Intro)"		*Interlude*
4	"Solar Powered"	OneManArmy	OneManArmy, Senim Silla
5	"Slang Blade (Intro)"		*Interlude*
6	"Slang Blade"	Decompoze	Senim Silla
7	"Binary Shuffle (Intro)"		*Interlude*
8	"Binary Shuffle"	Senim Silla	OneManArmy, Senim Silla
9	"Fellowship"	OneManArmy	OneManArmy, Senim Silla, Athletic Mic League, Decompoze
10	"New Hip Hop"	Decompoze	OneManArmy, Senim Silla
11	"Masters of the Universe"	Decompoze	OneManArmy, Senim Silla
12	"Indy 500"	Decompoze	Decompoze
13	"Evolution of Man"	Decompoze	OneManArmy, Brenda J
14	"I Know Why the Caged Bird Sings (Part 1)"	Decompoze	Senim Silla
15	"I Know Why the Caged Bird Sings (Part 2)"	Decompoze	OneManArmy
16	"Honest Expression"	OneManArmy	OneManArmy, Senim Silla
17	"Honest Expression (Outro)"		*Interlude*
18	"Glen Close"	Decompoze, OneManArmy	OneManArmy
19	"Wolfman Jack (Intro)"		*Interlude*
20	"Wolfman Jack"	Decompoze, OneManArmy	OneManArmy, Senim Silla
21	"OneManArmy"	OneManArmy	OneManArmy
22	"The KGB (Intro)"		*Interlude*
23	"The KGB"	OneManArmy	Malaki, Senim Silla, Texture, Elzhi, O-Type, Lacks, OneManArmy, J.U.I.C.E.
24	"Album Outro"		*Interlude*
