= Vakill =

American rapper

- Born: Donald Mason; March 21, 1975 (age 51)
- Origin: Chicago, Illinois, U.S.
- Genres: Hip hop
- Years active: 1991–present
- Label: Molemen Records

Donald Mason, also known as Vakill (Born in March 21, 1975) is an American rapper from Chicago, Illinois. Vakill is known through his association with Chicago Hip Hop collective The Molemen, and has released three studio albums.

== Early years ==
Raised on the South side of Chicago on 119th Street, Vakill was involved in Hip Hop at as early as eight years old, originally focusing on the break dancing element of the culture. In the '80s, Vakill began focusing rhyming, and found inspiration from respected lyricists such as Kool G Rap, Pharoahe Monch and Nas. In 1991, he met a high school classmate named Ed Zamudio at a local weekly event called Terrordome. Zamudio, later known as Panik, and Vakill, along with producers Memo and PNS formed the Molemen.

== Recording history ==
Vakill debuted as a solo artist in 1995, with the release of a cassette titled Who's Afraid?. He remained on the local scene throughout the late '90s, making numerous collaborations, and releasing a number of singles, most notably 1996's "Keep the Fame", a collaboration with veteran emcee Percee P and future Chicago Hip Hop star Rhymefest. In following years, Vakill contributed tracks to subsequent releases by the Molemen, with "Finyl Thought" appearing on the 1997 EP Below the Ground, "Know the Bidness" appearing on the 1998 EP Buried Alive, "Urban Legend" appearing on the 2001 album Chicago City Limits, Vol. 1, and "The Equinox" and "Face Down" appearing on the 2001 album Ritual of the Molemen. 2001 saw the release of a Vakill compilation titled Kill Em All, featuring all the tracks from Who's Afraid?, as well as a number of songs and freestyles recorded throughout the '90s.

The emcee released his long-awaited debut album, The Darkest Cloud, in 2003 on Molemen Records. The album was produced by Molemen members Panik and Memo, DJ Contakt and Mixx Massacre, and featured the single "End of Days". While acclaimed, the album did not reach past rap's underground scene, and failed to produce a significant amount of sales. The rapper returned three years later with his second album, Worst Fears Confirmed, released in early 2006. The album featured production from the Molemen, as well as appearances from acclaimed lyricists Ras Kass and Royce Da 5'9". In 2011 he released his third studio album The Armor of God.

== Discography ==
Album information
The Darkest Cloud
- Released: May 5, 2003
- Label: Molemen Records
- Singles: "End of Days"/"Sickplicity"/"The Creed"
Worst Fears Confirmed
- Released: January 31, 2006
- Label: Molemen Records
Armor of God
- Released: June 14, 2011
- Label: Molemen Records

=== EPs/Singles ===
- Who's Afraid? (EP, 1995)
- "Flows You Can't Imagine" (Single, 2000)
- "Out the Speakers" (Single, 2000)
- "Va2K" (Single, 2000)
- "End of Days" (Single, 2003)
- "World War V" (TBA)

== Appears on ==
- 1996 "Keep the Fame" (from the single "Taste of Chicago" b/w "Keep the Fame")
- 1997 "Finyl Thought" (from the Molemen EP Below the Ground)
- 1998 "Know the Bittness" (from the Molemen EP Buried Alive)
- 2001 "Urban Legend" (from the Molemen album Chicago City Limits, Vol. 1)
- 2001 "The Equinox", "Face Down" (from the Molemen album Ritual of the Molemen)
- 2002 "It's On" (from the DJ Vadim album U.S.S.R.: The Art of Listening)
- 2005 "Can You Relate" (from the Molemen compilation Lost Sessions)
- 2006 "Cold War (Remix)", "Under the Gun" (from the Molemen compilation Chicago City Limits, Vol. 2)
- 2006 "V" (from the Molemen album Killing Fields)
- 2013 "Cypher" (off Juellz Album "Jewelz")
