= Chemistry: An Asian Journal =

- Discipline: Chemistry
- Language: English
- Edited by: Dinesh Talwar

Publication details
- History: 2006–present
- Publisher: Wiley-VCH on behalf of the Asian Chemical Editorial Society.
- Frequency: Biweekly
- Impact factor: 3.2 (2025)

Standard abbreviations
- ISO 4: Chem.: Asian J.
- NLM: Chem Asian J

Indexing
- CODEN: CAAJBI
- ISSN: 1861-4728 (print); 1861-471X (web)
- LCCN: 2007243072
- OCLC no.: 70873400

Links
- Journal homepage; Online access; Online archive

Chemistry: An Asian Journal is a peer-reviewed scientific journal that publishes articles on all areas of chemistry and related fields. It is published by Wiley-VCH on behalf of the Asian Chemical Editorial Society.

== Abstracting and indexing ==
The journal is indexed and abstracted in the following bibliographic databases:

- Academic Search Premier
- Chimica
- Compendex
- EMBASE
- MEDLINE
- Science Citation Index Expanded
- Scopus

According to the Journal Citation Reports, the journal has a 2025 impact factor of 3.2, ranking it 121nd out of 250 in the category Multidisciplinary Chemistry.
