= DJ Scene =

American producer and DJ

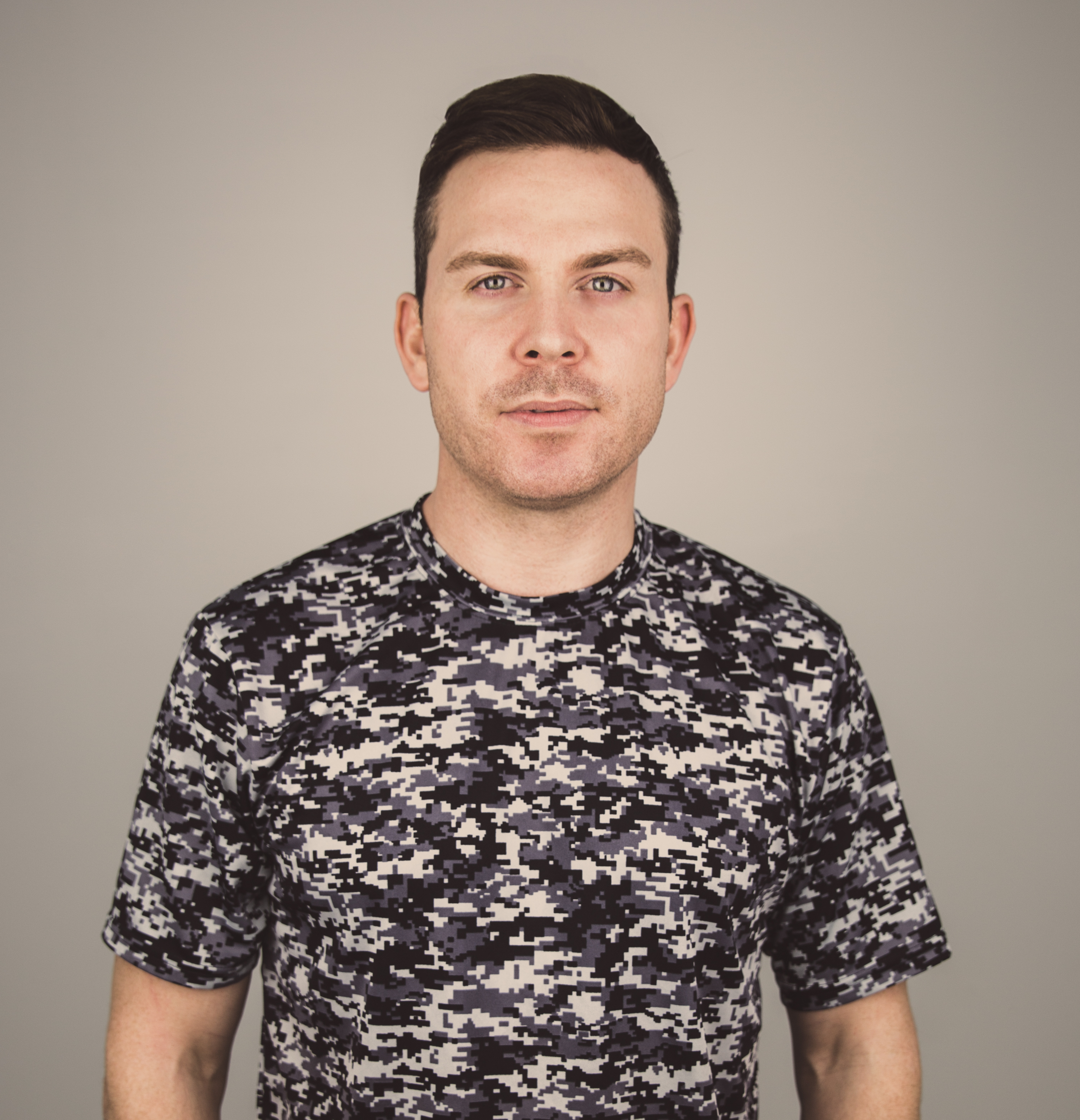

Background information
- Born: Brian Alex Herwander
- Origin: Las Vegas, Nevada
- Genres: Electronic, Turntablism, Trap, Hip Hop, House,
- Occupations: Producer, DJ
- Instruments: Turntables, Serato DJ Pro, Ableton, Access Virus TI, Moog Little Phatty
- Label: Fool's Gold Records
- Website: http://www.djscene.com

DJ Scene is an American producer and DJ.

Scene has performed with a variety of different artists, including 50 Cent, Ludacris, Nas, Tiesto, Busta Rhymes, Benny Benassi, Jurassic 5, Fedde Le Grand, The Roots, De La Soul, Naughty By Nature, Lil Jon, DJ Premier, DJ AM, Common, Public Enemy, Sir Mix-A-Lot, and Method Man.

== Background ==
=== Early life ===
DJ Scene, born Brian Alex Herwander, is an Everett, Washington native. He moved to Yakima, Washington at sixteen, where he purchased his first turntables. His initial plan was not DJing in clubs; he was a drummer in a small band and thought the addition of scratching would bring a unique sound to the band.

=== Notoriety ===
DJ Scene moved to Seattle, Washington at age eighteen. His first weekly radio show was with DJ B-Mello on KEXP-FM 90.3. After opening for 50 Cent in 2002, Scene was asked by KUBE to try out as an on-air mixer. He began mixing daily on the "Mixtape at 8" and soon started doing the "5 o'clock Traffic Jam" on Fridays. XM Satellite Radio 67 'The City' approached Scene and began broadcasting his pre-recorded mixes nationally 5 days a week.

Before clubs and radio became primary, Scene made a name for himself in the DJ battle circuit, becoming the 2002 Northwest DMC Champion, a competition held in New York City by DMC World and hosted by Jam Master Jay several weeks prior to his death. Around the same time, he helped lay the foundation for one of Seattle's most legendary nights, 'Yo Son!' at Chop Suey, which Rolling Stone named 'one of the country's top parties'.

In 2013, Scene placed first in the Las Vegas, Redbull Thre3Style competition, moving on to the Redbull Thre3Style USA national championship, where he placed second.

=== Las Vegas ===
DJ Scene started playing Las Vegas in 2005, where he was first booked to play New Year's Eve at Club Ice. He went on to sign his first Vegas residency with Light Group and played weekly at Jet Nightclub inside and eventually became so active in Las Vegas, he moved there soon after he locked in his Vegas residency. The Mirage and Light Nightclub inside the Bellagio (now 'The Bank').

In 2008, Scene started his first Vegas pool residency, playing every Sunday and Monday at Wet Republic at the MGM Grand Las Vegas. During the same year, he began a new weekly Tuesday residency at Studio 54 inside the MGM Grand Las Vegas.

The following year in 2009, Scene began working with N9NE Group and was regularly at Moon Nightclub at the top of The Palms and 'Ditch Fridays' at The Palms pool. Then in 2010 DJ Scene moved again, this time to the new CityCenter to play every Thursday at Liquid pool inside Aria Resort & Casino. This was also the year Scene was named Las Vegas Weekly's "Best Pool DJ". Scene currently holds a Thursday night residency at Haze Nightclub at the Aria Hotel in Las Vegas.

=== 2013 ===
DJ Scene acquired residencies including Encore Beach Club, Haze Las Vegas, Shrine at MGM Grand Foxwoods, The Estate Boston, The Park Sacramento, Manor West San Francisco, and Mur.Mur at The Borgata in Atlantic City. Scene is also a producer. He produced Naughty By Nature's official 20yr anniversary remix of "Hip Hop Hooray" in 2013. His single "DAMN", with Jayceeoh was released Nov 2013 on Fools Gold Records and it received major support from A-Trak and other notable DJs. Scene is the 2013 Westcoast Thre3Style champion, has been voted 'Vegas Best Pool DJ' twice by JackColton.com, 'Best Open Format DJ' by RemixReport.com and has a DMC champion title under his belt.

== Style ==
Scene is known for incorporating various styles of music into his work. His distinct style of scratching, live remixing and blending classic party anthems, spans every genre from AC/DC to Jay-Z and 80s to pop. He is able to spin open format, EDM, 80s sets, old school hip hop, and everything in between. DJ Scene also established the brand '2080s' and released 2080s parts 1 and 2 on CD which remixes, blends and scratches 80s classics. The brand was inspired by the desire to produce something his parents could relate to and get a look into the type of work he does.

Scene's mix "Epic Shine" is a first-hand glance into the Vegas pool day life. The idea formulated from his 2010 residency at Liquid Pool at Aria Resort & Casino.

== Mixshow and podcast ==
Aside from the constant traveling, collaborations and performances, Scene currently has a weekly mixshow every Saturday on Wild 94.9 FM in San Francisco, California. Scene also has an iTunes podcast that he updates frequently, reaching the ears of over 400,000 subscribers through iTunes and features a variety of free downloads.

== Discography ==
=== Singles ===
Year	Title	Artist
2018	"Bumbaclot"	DJ Scene ft. Mad Lion
2017	"Badman"	DJ Scene
2017	"Scratch Ammo 3"	DJ Scene
2017	"Scratch Ammo 2"	DJ Scene
2016	"Cannon"	DJ Scene & Mastamonk
2016	"Wonka"	DJ Scene & Bacosaurus
2015	"Slap It Down (4 Song EP)"	DJ Scene & FourColorZack
2014	"Scratch Ammo"	DJ Scene
2013	"Damn"	DJ Scene & JayCeeOh

=== Bootlegs ===
Year	Title	Artist
2019	"High Hopes" (DJ Scene Bootleg)	Panic! At The Disco vs. WILDLYF
2018	"Still Fly" (DJ Scene Forgotten Bootleg)	Big Tymers
2018	"Sky Walker" (DJ Scene Shooting Stars Bootleg)	Miguel ft. Travis Scott
2018	"T-Shirt" (DJ Scene Era Bootleg)	Migos vs. RL Grime
2018	"Rockstar" (DJ Scene Chalice California Bootleg)	Post Malone ft. 21 Savage
2018	"Rockstar" (DJ Scene Goons Bootleg)	Post Malone ft. 21 Savage
2018	"Finesse" (DJ Scene vs Bad Royal Helicopter Bootleg)	Bruno Mars
2018	"I Write Sins Not Tragedies" (DJ Scene Wave Board Bootleg)	Panic! At The Disco
2018	"Top Off" (DJ Scene Ole Bootleg)	DJ Khaled ft. JAY Z, Future, & Beyonce
2018	"Dude" (DJ Scene Push It Bootleg)	Beenie Man
2018	"Dude" (Remix)	Beenie Man ft. Ms. Thing & Shawnna
2018	"Let You Down vs. Ready To Go"	NF vs. Freakonamics & Lookas
2018	"Basket Case"	Green Day vs. Major Lazer & Grandtheft
2017	"Clarity" (DJ Scene Jetlag Bootleg)	Zedd feat. Foxes vs. Mike Williams & Brooks
2017	"No Promises" (DJ Scene Bootleg)	Cheat Codes feat. Demi Lovato vs. Don Diablo
2017	"Basket Case" (DJ Scene Number One Bootleg)	Green Day
2017	"Heads Will Roll" (DJ Scene Rockin' Bootleg)	Yeah Yeah Yeahs
2017	"Unforgettable" (DJ Scene Edit)	French Montana feat. Swae Lee vs. Beyonce
2017	"Mask Off" (DJ Scene Flash Funk Bootleg)	Future
2017	" No Problem" (DJ Scene Bootleg)	Chance The Rapper vs. Marshmello vs. Lil Scrappy
2017	"Everyday We Lit" (DJ Scene Bootleg) feat. PnB Rock	YFN Lucci
2017	"More Than You Know" (DJ Scene Cowbell Bootleg)	Axwell & Ingrosso vs. Ummet Ozcan vs. DOLF & Juyen Sebulba
2017	"Prendelo El Africano" (DJ Scene Prendelo Bootleg)	Sak Noel, Salvi & Garvanin X Wilfrido Vargas
2016	"In My Room" (DJ Scene Remix)	Yellow Claw & DJ Mustard feat. Ty Dolla Sign & Tyga
2016	"Controlla" (DJ Scene Transition 100-128)	Drake x Madison Mars
2016	"Ride" (DJ Scene Edit)	Twenty One Pilots x Borgore x Barrington Levy
2016	"Hip Hop" (DJ Scene Bootleg)	Dead Prez vs. What So Not

Mixes and artwork
Title	Cover
DJ Scene Podcast	
2080s Part 1	
2080s Part 2	
Epic Shine	
"Hip Hop Hooray" (DJ Scene Remix)	
