= Soul on Ice (album) =

Studio album by Ras Kass
- Released: October 1, 1996
- Recorded: 1994–96
- Genres: West Coast hip-hop; hardcore rap; political hip-hop; underground hip-hop
- Length: 63:05
- Labels: Patchwerk/Priority; 0499 2 50529 2 3 P2-50529
- Producers: Lamont "Bird" Holdby; Ras Kass; Battlecat; Vooodu; Michael "Flip" Barber; Michael Schlesinger; Reno Delajuan

Ras Kass chronology
Soul on Ice (1996)	Rasassination (1998)

Singles from Soul on Ice
- 1. "Miami Life" Released: March 20, 1996; 2. "Anything Goes" Released: July 16, 1996; 3. "Soul on Ice" Released: November 26, 1996

Soul on Ice is the debut album by West Coast emcee Ras Kass, released on October 1, 1996, under Priority Records. The album was produced by Ras Kass, as well as Battlecat, Vooodu, Lamont "Bird" Holdby, Michael "Flip" Barber, Michael Schlesinger, and Reno Delajuan. Fellow West Coast rapper Coolio makes the only guest appearance on the album on the song "Drama". The album's title is a reference to Black Panther member Eldridge Cleaver's 1968 book Soul on Ice. Two charting singles were released from the album, "Anything Goes" and "Soul on Ice". It received minimal commercial attention at the time of its release, but has since garnered retrospective critical praise for Ras Kass' complex, historically-aware lyricism.

== Background ==
An avid reader in his youth, Ras Kass adopted his stage name in honor of Ethiopian emperor Ras Kassa. In 1993, with funding from his high school friend and then-Atlanta Falcons offensive tackle Bob Whitfield, Ras Kass recorded his demo. The following year, under Whitfield's label PatchWerk Recordings, Ras Kass released his first single "Remain Anonymous". The success of the single, which garnered critical praise in The Source's December 1994 issue, led to him signing a deal with Priority Records.

The album's title was inspired by Black Panther member Eldridge Cleaver's 1968 book Soul on Ice, from which Ras Kass formed many of his lyrical themes. The album's seven-minute long track, "Nature of the Threat", has been described as "an exploration of racism throughout history" and a "history lesson". Ras Kass described how he gathered the information to create the track:

I always tell people that "Nature of the Threat" — I wrote it for myself; it's an extremely selfish song. But I did the footwork ... I went to a community college and I took the classes that would help me get a better understanding. Physical Anthropology, Cultural Anthropology, Ancient History, World History, Black History, American History, whatever — just history. I wanted to soak it in. And studying outside of that, they all corroborated each other. There's very little that I learned in one book that wasn't corroborated in the other books — no matter who was writing them. So I found that very interesting.

In a six-month period leading up to the album's release, Ras Kass was featured in The Source's "Hip-Hop Quotable" column and twice featured in Rap Pages' "Rhyme of the Month" column, earning a reputation as a highly skilled lyricist.

== Critical reception ==
Professional ratings
Review scores
Source	Rating
AllMusic	3/5 stars
Muzik	5/5 stars
RapReviews	8.5/10
The Source	3/5 stars

Will Ashon of Muzik praised Soul on Ice as "a powerful journey through Ras' life, grounded in a historical-political-theological analysis of the plight of the black race", concluding that it was "post-encyclopedia-black-power-lyricism". Carlito Rodriguez of The Source commended Ras Kass' lyricism, stating that he "drops material that'll have history buffs, religious theorists and English majors alike either reaching for their reference books or bustin' off in their Fruit of the Looms".

In a retrospective piece, Stylus Magazine critic Brett Berliner noted that several years into Ras Kass' career, "he still hasn't matched the awe and skill of Soul on Ice", hailing it as "one of the most next level albums of all time, lyrically". Steve Juon of RapReviews commented that the album "still stands as a testament to what an MC with unlimited potential and the free reign [sic] to say it can truly do".

== Track listing ==
No.	Title	Producer(s)	Length
1.	"On Earth as It Is..."	Lamont "Bird" Holdby and Ras Kass	4:43
2.	"Anything Goes"	Lamont "Bird" Holdby and Ras Kass	5:49
3.	"Marinatin'"	Battlecat	4:05
4.	"Reelishymn"	Lamont "Bird" Holdby and Ras Kass	4:27
5.	"Nature of the Threat"	Vooodu	7:43
6.	"Etc."	Lamont "Bird" Holdby and Ras Kass	3:12
7.	"Sonset"	Michael "Flip" Barber, Michael Schlesinger, Ras Kass and Reno Delajuan	6:00
8.	"Drama" (featuring Coolio)	Lamont "Bird" Holdby and Ras Kass	3:46
9.	"The Evil That Men Do"	Vooodu	6:10
10.	"If/Then"	Michael "Flip" Barber and Ras Kass	4:50
11.	"Miami Life"	Michael "Flip" Barber and Ras Kass	4:06
12.	"Soul on Ice"	Lamont "Bird" Holdby	3:42
13.	"Ordo Abchao (Order Out of Chaos)"	Vooodu	4:30

== Samples ==
Anything Goes

- "Oooh This Love Is So" by Al B. Sure!
- "Blue Suede Shoes" by Carl Perkins

Reelishymn

- "Goin' Out of My Head" by Little Anthony and the Imperials

Drama

- "Tryin' to Get the Feeling Again" by Hubert Laws
- "Gin and Juice" by Snoop Dogg
- "High Snobiety" by Ralph Marco Band

Etc.

- "How Many MC's..." by Black Moon
- "The Mighty Quinn (Quinn the Eskimo)" by Ramsey Lewis
- "Moshitup" by Just-Ice feat. KRS-One

If/Then

- "Stay Still (And Let Me Love You)" by Ronnie Laws
- "Bitches Ain't Shit by Dr. Dre

Marinatin'

- "You Gots to Chill" by EPMD

On Earth as It Is...

- "Spinning Wheel" by Lonnie Smith
- "La Dolce Vita" by Sparks
- "10% Dis" by MC Lyte

Sonset

- "You're Gettin' a Little Too Smart" by The Detroit Emeralds
- "Eric B. Is President" by Eric B. & Rakim
- "Underground" by EPMD

Soul on Ice

- "School Boy Crush" by Average White Band

The Evil That Men Do

- "Kool Is Back" by Funk, Inc.
- "Barefoot Ballet" by John Klemmer
- "Color Blind" by Ice Cube, WC and the Maad Circle

Ordo Abchao (Order Out of Choas)

- "Universe" by Hampton Hawes

== Charts ==
Chart (1996)	Peak position
US Billboard 200	169
US Top R&B/Hip-Hop Albums (Billboard)	35
