= The R.E.B.I.R.T.H. =

Studio album by One Be Lo
- Released: December 11, 2007
- Genre: Hip hop
- Label: Subterraneous Records
- Producers: 14KT; Bean One; D.L. Jones; Eric G.; Jake One; K. Kruz; Memo; Texture; Vitamin D

One Be Lo chronology
S.O.N.O.G.R.A.M. (2005)	The R.E.B.I.R.T.H. (2007)	L.A.B.O.R. (2011)

Professional ratings
Review scores
Source	Rating
AllMusic	3.5/5 stars
Cokemachineglow	74/100%
HipHopDX	4/5
PopMatters	8/10
RapReviews	8/10

The R.E.B.I.R.T.H. is the third solo studio album by American hip hop artist One Be Lo. It was released on December 11, 2007, via Subterraneous Records. Production was handled by Texture, Jake One, 14KT, Bean One, D.L. Jones, Eric G., K. Kruz, Memo and Vitamin D, with Marc Matsui and One Be Lo serving as executive producers. It features the lone guest appearance from Marvin Scruggs and contributions from David McMurray and Scott Summer.

The acronym "R.E.B.I.R.T.H." stands for "Real Emcee's Bring Intelligent Rhymes To Hip-Hop".

== Track listing ==
No.	Title	Producer(s)	Length
1.	"Rebirth"	Texture	3:12
2.	"Born & Raised"	K. Kruz	3:32
3.	"Keep It Rollin'" (featuring Marvin Scruggs)	Memo	3:36
4.	"Smash"	Jake One	3:21
5.	"Headlines"	Texture	3:19
6.	"War"	Bean One	4:48
7.	"Don't Sleep"	Vitamin D	3:50
8.	"House Rules"	Texture	3:08
9.	"Snap Shot"	Eric G.	2:16
10.	"The G Gap"	Jake One	4:33
11.	"Gray"	D.L. Jones	4:57
12.	"Hip Hop Heaven"	14KT	8:25

== Personnel ==
- Roland "One Be Lo" Scruggs – lyrics, vocals, executive producer
- Marvin Scruggs – vocals (track 3)
- Scott Summer – electric piano (track 11)
- David McMurray – saxophone (track 11)
- Vaughan "Texture" Taylor – producer (tracks: 1, 5, 8)
- Keith "K. Kruz" Kreuser – producer (track 2)
- Korey "Memo" Mitchell – producer (track 3)
- Jacob "Jake One" Dutton – producer (tracks: 4, 10)
- Cavin "Bean One" Stocker – producer (track 6), mixing
- Derrick "Vitamin D" Brown – producer (track 7)
- Eric Gabouer – producer (track 9)
- Patrick "D.L. Jones" Ward – producer (track 11)
- Kendall "14KT" Tucker – producer (track 12)
- David E. "D-Sane" Severance III – mastering
- Marc Matsui – executive producer
- Kyle Johnson – photography
- SkinnyBoysGraphix – art direction, design
