= Project F.E.T.U.S. =

Project: F.E.T.U.S.

Studio album by One Be Lo
- Released: 2002
- Genres: Hip hop, alternative hip hop
- Length: 63:08
- Labels: Subterraneous Records; The LA Underground
- Producers: The Trackezoids; One Be Lo; Decompoze; Chic Masters; Magestik Legend

One Be Lo chronology
WaterWorld Too (2001)	Project: F.E.T.U.S. (2002)	S.O.N.O.G.R.A.M. (2005)

Project: F.E.T.U.S. is an album by rapper One Be Lo that was first released in 2002. Over half the album was recorded before the release of the Binary Star album Masters of the Universe in 2000. The original goal of the album was to press only 1000 copies for fans that wanted to hear anything from One Be Lo that was available but after those copies were sold in less than 2 weeks they decided to press more. The LA Underground picked up the album and re-released it in 2003, releasing it under the name "OneBeLo aka OneManArmy" (originally labeled as just OneBeLo). The whole album was intentionally not mixed or mastered and is basically a compilation of rejected songs for the album L.I.F.E.

The acronym F.E.T.U.S. stands for "For Everyone That UnderStands".

== Track listing ==
#	Title	Producer(s)	Performer (s)
1	"Intro"	One Be Lo	*Interlude*
2	"Anybody"	Decompoze	One Be Lo
3	"Lesson #1"	Decompoze	One Be Lo
4	"Mic Check"	Decompoze	One Be Lo, Buff 1
5	"Dro"	One Be Lo	One Be Lo, Magestik Legend
6	"Fast Food Remix"	Decompoze	One Be Lo, Magestik Legend, Decompoze, Illite
7	"Take It 2 da Stage"	Decompoze	One Be Lo, Decompoze
8	"What Time Is It"	Decompoze	One Be Lo
9	"Here and Now"	One Be Lo	One Be Lo
10	"Alphabet Soup"	Chic Masters	One Be Lo
11	"One Man's Mission"	Decompoze	One Be Lo
12	"Waterworld"	One Be Lo	One Be Lo
13	"The Grinch That Stole Christmas"	Magestik Legend	One Be Lo
14	"Sportz Illa"	Decompoze	One Be Lo, Decompoze
15	"Candlestick"	Decompoze	One Be Lo
16	"What It's All About (Remix)"	Decompoze	One Be Lo, Decompoze
17	"Double Essay (S.S.A.) (Remix)"	Decompoze	One Be Lo
18	"Freakin' Flowz (Remix)"	Decompoze	One Be Lo, Decompoze
19	"One Man Army (Remix)"	Decompoze	One Be Lo
