= Molemen (producers) =

American hip hop group

- Origin: Chicago, Illinois, U.S.
- Genres: Hip hop
- Years active: 1991–present
- Label: Molemen Records
- Members: Panik; Memo; PNS
- Past members: Mixx Massacre

Molemen is an American hip hop record production team from Chicago, Illinois. It consists of Panik, Memo, and PNS. The group organized Chicago Rocks, an annual hip hop showcase.

== History ==
In 1997, Molemen released an EP, Below the Ground. It was compiled with another EP, Buried Alive, on a 2000 compilation album, Below the Ground/Buried Alive. In 2001, the group released a studio album, Ritual of the Molemen. It includes guest appearances from Juice, Rhymefest, Vakill, C-Rayz Walz, Rasco, Slug, Aesop Rock, and MF Doom. In 2002, the group released a collaborative album with rapper Capital D, titled Writer's Block (The Movie).

== Discography ==
=== Studio albums ===
- Ritual of the Molemen (2001)
- Writer's Block (The Movie) (2002) (with Capital D)

=== Compilation albums ===
- The Soundtrack to the Underground Instrumentals (1999)
- Below the Ground/Buried Alive (2000)
- Chicago City Limits Vol. 1 (2001)
- Lost Sessions (2005)
- Chicago City Limits Vol. 2 (2006)
- Killing Fields (2006)

=== EPs ===
- Below the Ground (1997)
- Buried Alive (1998)
- Locked (2002)

=== Singles ===
- "Put Your Quarter Up" / "Persevere" / "Follow Me" (2001)
- "Currency Exchange" (2002)
- "Life Sentence" (2007)
