= S.O.N.O.G.R.A.M. =

Studio album by One Be Lo
- Released: February 8, 2005
- Recorded: 2000–2003
- Studio: 40 Oz. Sound (Ann Arbor, MI); Frontline Studio (Chicago, IL)
- Genre: Alternative hip hop
- Length: 1:08:36
- Label: Fat Beats Records
- Producer: Chic Masters; Decompoze; Magestik Legend; One Be Lo

One Be Lo chronology
Project F.E.T.U.S. (2003)	S.O.N.O.G.R.A.M. (2005)	The R.E.B.I.R.T.H. (2007)

Singles from S.O.N.O.G.R.A.M.
- 1. "Rocketship / E.T." Released: September 17, 2004; 2. "Decepticons (Pete Rock Remix)" Released: January 13, 2005; 3. "Sleepwalking / Unparalleled" Released: April 18, 2005

Professional ratings
Review scores
Source	Rating
AllMusic	4.5/5 stars
IGN	8.2/10
PopMatters	9/10
RapReviews	8.5/10

S.O.N.O.G.R.A.M. (stylised in lowercase) is the second solo studio album by American alternative hip hop musician One Be Lo. It was released on February 8, 2005, via Fat Beats Records. Recording sessions took place at 40 Oz. Sound in Ann Arbor and Frontline Studio in Chicago. Production was handled entirely by production team Trackezoids, which is composed of One Be Lo himself, Magestik Legend, Decompoze and Chic Masters. It features guest appearances from Abdus Salaam, Magestik Legend, Charmaine Gibson, Decompoze, Kadi, Marvin Scruggs and Zo-Zer.

The acronym "S.O.N.O.G.R.A.M." stands for "Sounds Of Nashid Originate Good Rhymes And Music".

== Track listing ==
No.	Title	Writer(s)	Producer(s)	Length
1.	"Intro (1)"	Roland Scruggs	One Be Lo	1:37
2.	"The UNDERground"	Scruggs	Magestik Legend	2:52
3.	"enecS eht no kcaB"	Scruggs	Decompoze	3:35
4.	"Questions" (featuring Abdus Salaam and Charmaine Gibson)	A. Andulusi; Charmaine Gibson	One Be Lo	1:47
5.	"Oggie"	Scruggs	Decompoze	1:36
6.	"Propaganda"	Scruggs	One Be Lo	2:40
7.	"The Ghetto" (featuring Marvin Scruggs and Zo-Zer)	Scruggs	One Be Lo	4:09
8.	"Axis"	Scruggs	Chic Masters	3:04
9.	"Sleepwalking" (featuring Kadi)	Scruggs; Yolanda K. Davis	Magestik Legend	4:05
10.	"True Love" (featuring Decompoze)	Scruggs; Damon Keith Robertson	Decompoze	4:14
11.	"Interlude"	Scruggs	One Be Lo	0:17
12.	"Used 2 Be Fly"	Scruggs	Chic Masters	4:39
13.	"Deceptacons"	Scruggs	Decompoze	3:26
14.	"Can't Get Enough" (featuring Magestik Legend)	Scruggs; Jesse L. Givens	Decompoze	4:55
15.	"Assassinations"	Scruggs	One Be Lo	0:48
16.	"Evil of Self" (featuring Abdus Salaam)	Scruggs; Andulusi	Decompoze	4:23
17.	"The Future"	Scruggs	Decompoze	3:25
18.	"E.T."	Scruggs	Decompoze	3:36
19.	"The Capital IST"	Scruggs	One Be Lo	0:56
20.	"Rocketship"	Scruggs	Decompoze	4:23
21.	"Unparalleled" (featuring Magestik Legend)	Scruggs; Givens	Magestik Legend	4:08
22.	"Follow My Lead"	Scruggs	One Be Lo	4:01
Total length:				1:08:36

== Personnel ==
- Raland "One Be Lo" Scruggs – main artist, producer (tracks: 1, 4, 6, 7, 11, 15, 19, 22), arrangement, sequencing, mixing, mastering, sleeve notes
- A. "Abdus Salaam" Andulusi – featured artist (tracks: 4, 16)
- Charmaine Gibson – featured artist (track 4)
- Marvin Scruggs – backing vocals (track 7)
- Zo-Zer – spoken word (track 7)
- Yolanda "Kadi" Davis – featured artist (track 9)
- Damon "Decompoze" Robertson – featured artist (track 10), producer (tracks: 3, 5, 10, 13, 14, 16–18, 20)
- Jesse "Magestik Legend" Givens – featured artist (tracks: 14, 21), producer (tracks: 2, 9, 21)
- Chic Masters – producer (tracks: 8, 12)
- DJ Virus – scratches (tracks: 2, 3, 8, 10, 20)
- DJ Phrikshun – scratches (tracks: 18, 20)
- John Williamson – mixing, mastering
- Lonestar – photography
- Osiris Navarro – additional photography, graphic design
- Aaron Biggs – additional photography
- Ethan Holben – A&R
