= Joseph Francis Kuhn =

American composer

Joseph Francis Kuhn (December 24, 1924 – March 10, 1962) was an American symphonic composer, arranger and conductor, particularly remembered for his sweeping rhapsodies, who was active from the 1950s until 1961, when he retired due to a terminal illness.

Kuhn was born December 24, 1924. He attended Northeast Catholic High School in Philadelphia and performed with the school band. He graduated in 1942 and joined the U.S. Army 103rd Infantry Division band, which performed for troops during World War II. While Kuhn was in Paris, he performed with jazz guitarist and composer Django Reinhardt. Upon his return to Philadelphia after the war, he studied music under the G.I. Bill. Kuhn had met Anna Marie Hughes while attending high school, and they were married in 1947. His wife Anna was an operatic singer and performed with the Philadelphia La Scala Opera and the Philadelphia Civic Opera.

== Early career ==
Kuhn was skilled on the piano and the guitar, and was composing music in the late 1940s and early 1950s inspired by the big band sound of Benny Goodman, Artie Shaw and other famed band leaders, and symphonic jazz composers like George Gershwin. He performed in many local clubs and other venues. In the late 1950s, Kuhn became affiliated with local record producer Dave Miller, who founded Essex and then Somerset Records in Media, Pennsylvania, roughly ten miles west of Philadelphia.

== 101 Strings ==
Miller conceived themed albums employing a very large orchestra performing original compositions and well known musical standards. Miller signed the Northwest German Radio Orchestra with conductor Wilhelm Stephan to record the arrangements at the Musikhalle in Hamburg, Germany, and the first recording was made there in October 1957. Joseph Kuhn scored or arranged many of the selections on the albums recorded by the 101 Strings.

Kuhn composed many original arrangements, all of which were performed by the 101 Strings and other groups and released on Somerset and Stereo-Fidelity Records. These include Manhattan Rhapsody, Tango for Strings, Midnight Rhapsody, Noche Amour, Rhapsody d’Amour, Starlight Rhapsody, Concerto to the Golden Gate, Beachcomber, Pavement Pigalle, Shipboard Romance, Blues Pizzicato, among others.

== Popular and themed works ==
Kuhn also composed more popular tunes for Miller International and released on Somerset, Stereo-Fidelity and Alshire Records. These include "Twistin’ U.S.A.", "An Odd Twist", "Lemon Twist", and "Organ Twist" on Come On Everybody Let’s Do The Twist. Kuhn also composed a number of polkas. These included "Helena Polka", "Charlie Was a Boxer", "Grandpa Likes to Polka", "Ha Ha Ha Polka", "Pizza Polka", "Stop and Go Polka", and "Carnival Polka". He also composed "Red River Cha Cha" and "Cuckoo Cha Cha" which appeared on a European release LP Surprise Partie Vol. 1

== Memorial Benefit ==
In 1961, Kuhn retired from his profession due to a terminal illness. He died on March 10, 1962, at the Philadelphia Naval Hospital and was buried at Holy Cross Cemetery. Dick Clark, emcee and producer of the immensely popular syndicated musical dance TV show, American Bandstand which was produced in Philadelphia, decided to put on a benefit concert at the Academy of Music (Philadelphia) for Kuhn’s widow and three children. Clark lined up Chubby Checker, Bobby Rydell, Del Shannon, Dee Dee Sharp, The Orlons and many other performers. To handle the expected crowds, Clark scheduled an afternoon matinee and an evening performance on April 8, 1962.
