= MC Juice =

American rapper (born 1973)

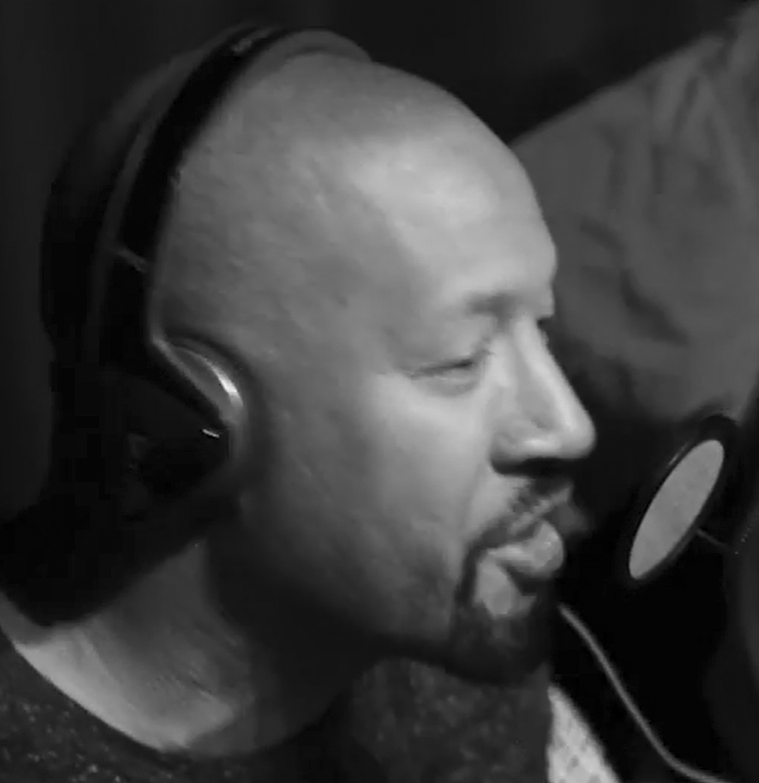
- MC Juice in 2012
- Born: Terry Parker; July 10, 1973 (age 53); Chicago, Illinois, U.S.
- Other names: J.U.I.C.E; MC Juice; Fresh T; T Fresh
- Occupation: Rapper
- Years active: 1993–present
- Children: 1
- Musical career
- Origin: Los Angeles, California, U.S.
- Genres: Alternative hip hop; Underground hip hop; Freestyle rap
- Instrument: Vocals
- Labels: Conglomerate Music Corp; Ground Control; C.A.L.I.; Moleman; Nobody Buys Records
- Website: cmcstarz.com

Terry Parker (born July 10, 1973), known professionally as MC Juice (often stylized as J.U.I.C.E), is an American rapper from Chicago, Illinois.

== History ==
Growing up, Juice spent the first four years of his life in Chicago, Illinois, before moving to California. At age 20, after high school, he returned to live in Chicago. But after recovering from a car accident that temporarily left him unable to freestyle rap, he moved back to Los Angeles, California. Since returning he has written for artists like Big Sean, Saweetie, Cash Doll, and Kanye West. After rising in the freestyle battle circuit, he is often said to be one of the best, if not the best, of freestyle battle rappers of all time. Juice had an undefeated streak, which is rare for any battle rapper, for most of his battle rap career before losing to Supernatural, a freestyle pioneer. He has defeated other notable artists in battles such as Rhymefest, Dose One, and Eminem, which is one of the most famous rap battles in hip hop history. Afterwards, he solidified his improvisational credentials on The Wake Up Show (official website) with Sway and King Tech as well as freestyling at every performance as part of the act.

Juice is also known for being featured in the track "The KGB" with the underground hip hop group Binary Star on their critically acclaimed album Masters of the Universe in 2000. His battle with fellow freestyler Supernat was featured in the documentary Freestyle: The Art of Rhyme.

By 2007, he had a six-piece live band called, "Juice and the Machine", who released a DVD, Juice And The Machine: Live At The Party, of their first live performance.

== Discography ==
=== Albums ===
- 100% J.U.I.C.E. (2001)
- Listen2Thawerds (2003)
- Tip of The Iceberg (2003)
- All Bets Off (2005)
- What Would Katmanndu (2008)
- New Money (2008)
- Bar'd Up (2016)

=== Singles, EPs ===
- Unrational / Root Of All (1997)
- The Man (1998)
- From the Heart (2000)
- Sincerely (2000)
- Fuckin' Wit My Team?! (2000)
- In the Trenches (2001)
- Pressure / Monday Night (2001)
- Session 1 (2001)
- Ill Hip Hop (2004)
- Coronation (2004)
- All Bets Off / What Up (2005)
- Where You Go (2020) on 7" vinyl
- Unseen (Sep. 1, 2021) on 7" vinyl

=== Features/Appearances ===
- Molemen – Below The Ground:(‘Freestyle or Written’) (1997)
- Roc Raida & DJ The Boy – Tales From The Flip - Level 3 - The Next Episode:(freestyle) (1998)
- Sway & King Tech – Wake Up Show Freestyles Vol. 4:(freestyles) (1998)
- Sway & King Tech – Wake Up Show Freestyles Vol. 5:(freestyle over the phone) (1999)
- Sway & King Tech – The Wake Up Show 9th Anniversary Live Album:(Vs Supernatural {2}) (1999)
- Molemen – Buried Alive E.P:(‘Period’) (1999)
- Molemen Inc.* – Presents... Below The Ground.Buried Alive:(‘Period’),(‘Freestyle or Written’),(‘How we Chill Part 2’ with Rhymefest) (2000)
- Various – Black Energy:(‘Woman Where Is Your Soul’ remix|Malik Yusef|featuring with Carl Thomas, Twista & Marvelous 11) (2000)
- Sway And King Tech* – Wake Up Show Freestyles Vol. 6:(freestyle with Supernatural {2}) (2000)
- Tony Touch – #63 - Don't Call It A Comeback:(‘Fu****g With My Team’) (2000)
- DJ BK – Tape #30:(‘Sincerely’) (2000)
- DJ BK – Tape #31:(not listed) (2000)
- Various – Nu Gruv Hip Hop Sampler 2000:(‘Sincerely’) (2000)
- Molemen – Chicago City Limits Vol. 1:(‘Urban Legend’ with Vakill),(Nasty Freestyle) (2001)
- Sway & King Tech – Wake Up Show Freestyles Vol. 7:(freestyle),(Freestyle with Thirstinhowl III) (2001)
- Various – Your Child / Ooh Wee / Wild N'Tha West:(‘Wild N’Tha West’) (2001)
- Molemen - Ritual of the Mole:(‘Reign’),(‘How We Chill Pt. 2’ 96’ with Rhymefest) (2001)
- Various – Juice CD Vol.14:(‘Ill Advisory’ by All Natural|produced by Capital D|As a feature) (2001)
- Various – Overlooked:(‘Pretty Obvious’ Produced by Chauncey Gardner|written by Atlas {17}, JDoubleU, Chauncie Gardner & Banner|Featuring with Qwazaar) (2001)
- Molemen – Locked:(‘Urban Legend’) (2002)
- Various – The Chicago Project - 100% Chicago Hip Hop:(‘Raise It Up’) (2002)
- Various – On Top Of The World (‘Take Heed’ by Strange Brew|produced by Old Man Malcolm|Juice as a feature) (2002)
- DJ Swan x, DJ 1Shot – Keep The Street Alive - Pure Underground Flavor The Come Back Vol. 2 (‘Fall Out’ with Mass Hysteria) (2003)
- Fat Daddy – Fat Daddy Hip-Hop Mix #23:(‘Rates of Exchange’ by Jeff Baraka|featuring with Slug) (2003)
- Vector Sigma – The Key Volume:(‘Armegeddon’) (2003)
- Cheap Cologne – Sexy Grandma Remixes:(‘In the Trenches’ remix) (2004)
- Mass Hysteria – Chicago The Underworld Mixtape:(‘In The Trenches/Wake Up Call’ remix) (2004)
- Shabazz & Real One* – Chicago All-City Official Mix Tape Vol.1:(‘No Wins’ with Longshot), (‘How We Chill’ with Rhymefest) (2004)
- Various – The No. 1 Hip Hop & R'N'B Classics Album (‘Get Ready’ remix|Malik Yusef|featuring with Carl Thomas, Twista, and Marva 11) (2005)
- Sway & King Tech – Back 2 Basics:( ‘Ill Hip Hop’), (‘Themselves’ with Supernatural) (2005)
- Various – Served The Compilation:(‘Set It Up’ with Pack Fm),(Exclusive Freestyle) (2005)
- Various – MCees And Poets - Rhymes And Royalties, Volumes 1 To 4 (‘Destiny’ with Mose the Third) (2005)
- Various – Chicago Underworld Vol.2:(‘No Love’|produced by EMAC) (2005)
- Love Dinero – When I Drop...Its Like Crack:(Freestyle dissin Mecca) (2006)
- Molemen – Killing Fields (‘The Come Up’ produced by Panik|Mixed by K-Kruz|Stratches by Ozone) (2006)
- Molemen – Molemen Inc. Presents... Chicago City Limits Vol. 2 (‘Where They At’ produced by Panik) (2006)
- Pugs Atomz* – Presents CTA Radio Chi City Hip Hop (‘Fall Out’ with Mass Hysteria|produced by SC|written with G, Green and Mass Hysteria) (2006)
- Various – The No. 1 R&B Classics Album (‘Get Ready’ remix by Malik Yusef|featuring with Carl Thomas, Twista, and Marvo 11) (2006)
- Sophisticats- True School Movement (Ft. Juice)- ON THE LOOSE (2007)
- Various – Long Range Distribution: Rap Snibblets Vol. 2 (‘Raise It Up’) (2007)
- DJ Maaleek – Internationally Known (‘Never remix’ with Scarface),(‘Can’t Tell Me Nothin’’),(‘No half Steppin’’),(N.W.A. Remix with Crooked),(‘Girl You Know’ with Scarface) (2007)
- Prime Presents Middle Ground – From The Ground Up:(‘Barbershop’ by Prime and Clew Rock|produced by Mixx Masacre|feature) (2007)
- Harley Hu$tle – Unsung Heroes:(‘Where They At’) (2007)
- Various – Flood The Block Hip Hop:(‘Sex Games’) (2008)
- Various – Underground Overstood:(‘Long Time Coming’|produced by Mondee) 2011
- DJ Andrew Unknown* & DJ Mekalek* – The Lost Freestyle Sessions Box Set:(Freestyle with Punchline and Eddie Brock) (2018)
