= 2010 in hip-hop =

This article summarizes the events, album releases, and album release dates in hip-hop for the year 2010.

== Events ==
=== January ===
- Producer Shawty Redd was arrested on a murder charge.

=== February ===
- Game signs a new record contract and returns to Aftermath Entertainment.
- Nujabes died on February 26, aged 36, in a traffic accident.

=== March ===
- Lil Wayne begins his one-year prison term. He shot over 30 music videos before his term.
- Ludacris becomes the first rapper in 2010 to be featured on 3 top 10 Billboard Hot 100 charted songs. (Justin Bieber's "Baby", Taio Cruz's "Break Your Heart", and "How Low")
- T.I. is officially released from prison and begins work on his seventh album.
- Lloyd Banks releases info via his Twitter that his new album will be called 'Hunger For More 2' and will attempt to take him back to his best work. However, the G-Unit label responded later that day stating that the title is tentative and not set in concrete.
- Ludacris' seventh studio album Battle of the Sexes becomes the first hip hop album of 2010 to debut at No. 1 on the Billboard 200.
- O.S.T.R.'s album Tylko dla dorosłych becomes the first hip hop album of 2010 to reach No. 1 on the OLiS.

=== April ===
- Dr. Dre announces the first single off his much anticipated Detox album. The track features Jay-Z.
- Lil Wayne's album Rebirth reaches gold, with 505,000 copies sold after two months of release.
- Eminem's album Relapse 2 is renamed to Recovery and confirmed to be released June 22, 2010.
- Guru dies on April 19, aged 48, from multiple myeloma.
- 50 Cent announces The Invitation Tour to promote Black Magic and Before I Self Destruct.
- B.o.B's track "Nothin' on You" becomes the first Hip Hop song of the year to hit number one on the Hot 100. The single was also certified platinum.

=== May ===
- B.o.B becomes the second Hip Hop act to top the Billboard 200 in 2010 with his album B.o.B Presents: The Adventures of Bobby Ray. It sold 85,000 copies in its first week.
- Gucci Mane is released from prison after spending 6 months behind bars for violating his probation. He announced that he has made a new label called 1017 Brick Squad Records and pushed back release date of his third album, The State vs. Radric Davis: The Appeal to a later date.
- Eminem's single "Not Afraid" debuts at number one on the Billboard Hot 100 becoming the first hip hop track to do so in 2010 and second hip hop song in history to debut at #1.
- Young Money's group album We Are Young Money is certified Gold.

=== June ===
- Ludacris' single "My Chick Bad" is RIAA certified Platinum.
- DJ Khaled's single "All I Do Is Win" is RIAA certified Gold.
- Ludacris' album Battle of the Sexes becomes the second hip hop album released in 2010 to be certified Gold.
- Lil Boosie is indicted on murder charges.
- DonGuralesko's album Totem Leśnych Ludzi becomes the second hip hop album of 2010 to reach No. 1 on the OLiS.
- Fat Joe and his entourage are questioned for sexual assault in Wisconsin.
- Drake's debut album Thank Me Later sold about 449,000 copies in its first week giving it a No. 1 debut on the Billboard 200.
- Eminem's new album Recovery debuts at No. 1 on the Billboard 200 and sold more copies than any album in one week during 2010.
- Hip-hop pioneer Rammellzee dies on June 29.
- Lil Wayne's single "Drop the World" is certified Platinum.
- Kid Cudi is arrested in Manhattan, New York and charged with felony criminal mischief and possession of a controlled substance. He is subsequently released in time to headline the Bonnaroo festival in Manchester, Tennessee.

=== July ===
- The rumored track list for Kanye West's Good Ass Job leaks.
- Eminem's album Recovery passes 1,000,000 copies sold in its second week.
- Eldo's album Zapiski z 1001 Nocy becomes the third hip hop album of 2010 to reach No. 1 on the OLiS.
- It is officially announced that. pending good behavior, rapper Lil Wayne will be released from prison on November 4, 2010.
- Eminem's single "Love the Way You Lie" tops the Billboard Hot 100, making it Eminem's fourth overall No. 1 single.

=== August ===
- Drake hosted the first annual OVO (October's Very Own) Festival which included the VIP list of rap stars including: Jay-Z, Eminem, Rick Ross, Young Jeezy, Bun B and Fabolous.
- The music videos for Kanye West's hit single Power and Eminem's hit single Love the Way You Lie debut the same day on MTV.
- DJ Khaled's single "All I Do Is Win" is RIAA certified Platinum.
- Kanye West's and Nicki Minaj's upcoming studio albums are titles are revealed to be Dark Twisted Fantasy and Pink Friday respectively.
- Hip-Hop's Cash Kings 2010 list comes out August 17, 2010. Jay-Z ($63 million), Diddy ($30 million), & Akon ($21 million) come on as the Hip-Hop Cash Kings in 2010. The rest follow as Lil Wayne ($20 million), Dr. Dre ($17 million), Ludacris ($16 million), Snoop Dogg ($15 million), Timbaland ($14 million), Pharrell Williams ($13 million), Drake ($10 million), T.I. ($9 million), Swizz Beatz ($9 million), Eminem ($8 million), 50 Cent ($8 million).
- DJ Khaled signs a record contract with Cash Money Records.
- Eminem's album Recovery reaches 2,000,000 sales in two months.

=== October ===
- On October 13, Harlem World member Huddy 6 is killed in a car accident at the George Washington Bridge in New York, aged 34.
- T.I.'s pending drug charges are dropped, but due to a violation of his parole, he is sentenced to 11 months in FCC Forrest City, a prison facility where he had previously served time for weapons-possession charges. It is speculated that these events caused him to change his upcoming album's title from King Uncaged to No Mercy.

=== November ===
- Lil Wayne is released from prison.
- Dr. Dre releases the first official single off Detox, titled "Kush", which features Snoop Dogg and Akon. The song peaks within the top 50 on the Billboard Hot 100.
- After 58 weeks on the charts, Kid Cudi's debut album, Man on the Moon: The End of Day, is certified Gold by the Recording Industry Association of America (RIAA).
- Atlanta rapper Waka Flocka Flame receives his first gold plaque for the single "No Hands" produced by Memphis, Tennessee's Drumma Boy, off his debut album Flockaveli.
- Nicki Minaj releases her debut album, Pink Friday. It sells 375,000 copies the first week.

Kanye West released My Beautiful Dark Twisted Fantasy

=== December ===
- Pittsburgh, Pennsylvania rapper Sam Willis's single "Peso" is certified Gold.
- Following an arrest for a probation violation, DMX is sentenced to a year in prison in Arizona.
- Lil Wayne releases "6 Foot 7 Foot", the first single off Tha Carter IV and his first single since being released from jail.
- Former Bad Boy artist G. Dep confesses to police regarding a cold case murder he committed in 1993, reportedly due to a want of "making amends" with his past.
- Former Cash Money Records artist Magnolia Shorty is shot and killed on December 20.

== Released albums ==
Release date	Artist	Album	Notes
January 5	Kanye West	VH1 Storytellers: Kanye West	Live album
January 19	RJD2	The Colossus	
January 19	Dessa	A Badly Broken Code	
January 26	Strong Arm Steady	In Search of Stoney Jackson	
January 26	DMX	The Best of DMX	
January 29	Maino	Unstoppable – The EP	
February 2	Lil Wayne	Rebirth	Debuted at No. 2 on Billboard 200; Singles: "Prom Queen", "On Fire", "Drop the World"; Certified Gold
February 2	Styles P & DJ Green Lantern	The Green Ghost Project	
February 2	Statik Selektah	100 Proof: The Hangover	
February 8	SwinDoe	SwinDoe	Debuted at No. 123 on Billboard 200
February 9	Canibus	Melatonin Magik	
February 9	DJ Kay Slay	More Than Just a DJ	Debuted at No. 133 on Billboard 200
February 16	Freeway & Jake One	The Stimulus Package	Debuted at No. 63 on Billboard 200
February 16	Pastor Troy	G.I. Troy – Strictly 4 My Soldiers	
February 19	Bushido	Zeiten ändern dich	Debuted at No. 2 on Media-Control-Charts, No. 1 on the Austrian Charts, No. 3 on the Swiss Charts
February 24	MellowHype	YelloWhite	Debuted at No. 3 on OLiS
February 26	O.S.T.R.	Tylko dla dorosłych	Debuted at No. 3 on OLiS
March 2	DJ Khaled	Victory	Debuted at No. 14 on Billboard 200; Singles: "Fed Up", "All I Do Is Win"
March 4	Sam Adams	Boston's Boy	
March 9	Ludacris	Battle of the Sexes	Debuted at No. 1 on Billboard 200; Singles: "How Low", "My Chick Bad", "Sex Room"; Certified Gold
March 9	Kidz in the Hall	Land of Make Believe	
March 9	Freeway & Beanie Sigel	The Roc Boys	Charted on Billboards Top R&B album charts at number 53
March 13	Gucci Mane	Burrrprint (2) HD	Debuted at No. 19 on Billboard 200; Retail Mixtape
March 23	Brotha Lynch Hung	Dinner and a Movie	Debuted at No. 69 on Billboard 200
March 23	Snoop Dogg	More Malice	Debuted at No. 29 on Billboard 200; Re-Release of Malice in Wonderland
March 23	Outlawz	The Lost Songs Vol. 1, The Lost Songs Vol. 2, The Lost Songs Vol. 3	
March 23	Young Noble	Noble Justice: The Lost Songs	
March 23	EDIDON	The Stash Spot	
March 23	Inspectah Deck	Manifesto	
March 23	J-Kwon	J-Kwon	
March 23	Marco Polo & Ruste Juxx	The eXXecution	
March 23	Donwill	Don Cusack In High Fidelity	
March 26	Spider Loc	Be About Your Money At All Costs (B.A.Y.M.A.A.C.)	
March 30	Army of the Pharaohs	The Unholy Terror	
March 30	E-40	Revenue Retrievin': Day Shift	Debuted at No. 47 on the Billboard 200; Spawned one successful single: "Bitch"
March 30	E-40	Revenue Retrievin': Night Shift	Debuted at No. 49 on the Billboard 200
March 30	Tech N9ne	The Lost Scripts of K.O.D.	Debuted at No. 117 on the Billboard 200
March 30	Meth, Ghost & Rae	Wu-Massacre	Debuted at No. 12 on the Billboard 200
March 30	Sho Baraka	Lions and Liars	Debuted at No. 149 on the Billboard 200
March 30	Manafest	The Chase	
March 30	Masta Killa	Masta Killa Live	
March 31	Earl Sweatshirt	EARL (Mixtape)	
April 4	Cuete Yeska	Love Stories, Part 2 -The Notebook	
April 6	Too Short	Still Blowin'	Debuted at No. 70 on the Hot R&B/Hip-Hop Songs Billboard chart; Internet only release
April 6	Insane Clown Posse	Bang! Pow! Boom! (Nuclear Version)	
April 6	Diabolic	Liar & a Thief	
April 13	Murs & 9th Wonder	Fornever	Debuted at No. 87 on the Billboard 200
April 14	Wiz Khalifa	Kush and Orange Juice (Mixtape)	
April 16	Chakuza	Monster in mir	Debuted at No. 8 on Media-Control-Charts
April 20	Little Brother	Leftback LP	Debuted at No. 128 on the Billboard 200
April 20	Cypress Hill	Rise Up	Debuted at No. 19 on the Billboard 200
April 20	Devin The Dude	Suite 420	Debuted at No. 85 on the Billboard 200
April 20	Andre Nickatina	Khan! The Me Generation	
April 20	Cognito	Automatic	
April 20	Kurupt	Streetlights	Debuted at No. 183 on the Billboard 200
April 20	Kottonmouth Kings	Long Live The Kings	Debuted at No. 26 on the Billboard 200
April 27	B.o.B	B.o.B Presents: The Adventures of Bobby Ray	Debuted at No. 1 on the Billboard 200; Singles: Nothin' on You, Don't Let Me Fall, Airplanes, Bet I, Magic, I'll Be in the Sky
April 27	Daddy Yankee	Mundial	
May 4	Bone Thugs-N-Harmony	Uni-5: The World's Enemy	Debuted at No. 14 on the Billboard 200
May 4	8Ball & MJG	Ten Toes Down	Debuted at No. 36 on the Billboard 200
May 4	Ayatollah	The Quixotic	
May 4	Trina	Amazin'	Debuted at No. 13 on the Billboard 200
May 4	Lil Cuete	The Only & Only	
May 7	Kay One	Kenneth allein zu Haus	Debuted at No. 7 on Media-Control-Charts
May 11	Boondox	South of Hell	
May 11	Sage Francis	Life	
May 12	KRS-One	Back to the L.A.B.	
May 18	Nas & Damian Marley	Distant Relatives	Debuted at No. 4 on the Billboard 200
May 18	Reflection Eternal	Revolutions Per Minute	Debuted at No. 17 on the Billboard 200
May 18	Styles P	The Ghost Dub-Dime	
May 18	Necro	Die!	
May 18	Guilty Simpson	O.J. Simpson	
May 18	Bizarre	Friday Night At St. Andrew's	
May 18	Madlib	Madlib Medicine Show No. 5: The History Of Loop Digga	
May 18	Tha Dogg Pound	Keep on Ridin	Compilation album
May 18	Esoteric	Fly Casualties	
May 18	Jermside & Danny Diggs	Middle Classic	
May 18	PackFM	I Fucking Hate Rappers	
May 18	Common	Go! Common Classics	Compilation album
May 18	Keak da Sneak	Mob Boss	
May 18	Roc Marciano	Marcberg	
May 25	Scarface	Dopeman Music	
May 25	Pastor Troy	Zero Tolerence	
May 25	Royce da 5'9"	Street Hop (Deluxe Edition)	
May 25	Cam’ron & The U.N.	Heat In Here Vol. 1	Debuted at No. 133 on the Billboard 200; Retail Mixtape
May 25	Apollo Brown	The Reset	
May 26	Noah23 & Vinyl Blight	Vermin vs Noah23 EP	
June 1	Yukmouth	Free at Last	
June 1	Kokane	Gimme All Mine	
June 1	Homeboy Sandman	The Good Sun	
June 1	June Marx	Body Of God	
June 4	Iyaz	Replay	
June 4	Noah23 & Playpad Circus	Noah23 / Playpad Circus	
June 8	Plies	Goon Affiliated	Debuted at No. 5 on the Billboard 200
June 8	Lil Jon	Crunk Rock	Debuted at No. 49 on the Billboard 200
June 8	Travie McCoy	Lazarus	Debuted at No. 37 on the Billboard 200; Singles: "Billionaire"
June 8	Rhymefest	El Che	
June 8	Ratatat	LP4	Debuted at No. 66 on the Billboard 200
June 8	Kutt Calhoun	Raw and Un-Kutt	Debuted at No. 145 on the Billboard 200
June 8	Reef the Lost Cauze	Fight Music	
June 8	MF Grimm	You Only Live Twice: The Audio Graphic Novel	
June 8	DJ Clay	Book of the Wicked, Chapter One	
June 11	DonGuralesko	Totem Leśnych Ludzi	Debuted at No. 1 on OLiS
June 11	Fler	Flersguterjunge	Debuted at No. 4 on Media-Control-Charts
June 14	Army of the Pharaohs	The Pharaoh Philes	
June 15	C-Murder	Tomorrow	
June 15	Nappy Roots	The Pursuit Of Nappyness	
June 15	Drake	Thank Me Later	Debuted at No. 1 on the Billboard 200; Singles: "Over", "Find Your Love", "Miss Me", and "Fancy"; Certified Platinum
June 15	Crooked I	Hood Star	
June 15	H-Ryda	Half Dead, Half Livin	
June 15	Pastor Troy	Attitude Adjuster 2	
June 15	Mr. Capone-E	The Blue Album	
June 15	Black C	70's Baby	
June 15	Dirty Circus	Alive and Well	Sweatshop Union side project
June 15	Pigeon Hole	Age Like Astronauts	Sweatshop Union side project
June 15	Trillionaire$	By Hook or by Crook	Sweatshop Union side project
June 18	Eminem	Recovery	Debuted at No. 1 on the Billboard 200; Singles: "Not Afraid", "Love the Way You Lie", "Space Bound", and "No Love"
Dolla	Made In Da ATL		
* Certified Quadruple Platinum
June 21	The Roots	How I Got Over	Debuted at No. 6 on the Billboard 200
June 21	Z-Ro	Heroin	Debuted at No. 131 on the Billboard 200
June 22	Blaze Ya Dead Homie	Gang Rags	Debuted at No. 52 on the Billboard 200
June 22	Madlib	Madlib Medicine Show No. 6: Brain Wreck Show	
June 22	Vinnie Paz	Season of the Assassin	
June 22	Trip Lee	Between Two Worlds	Debuted at No. 58 on the Billboard 200
June 22	Super Chron Flight Brothers	Cape Verde	
June 24	Tede	FuckTede / Glam Rap	Debuted at No. 3 on OLiS
June 24	Bumpy Knuckles	Music From The Man... Volume One	
June 29	3OH!3	Streets of Gold	Debuted at No. 7 on the Billboard 200
June 29	Marco Polo	The Stupendous Adventures	
June 29	Eternia & MoSS	At Last	
June 29	A.G.	Everything's Berri	
June 29	Eldo	Zapiski z 1001 Nocy	Debuted at No. 4 on OLiS
July 6	Big Boi	Sir Luscious Left Foot: The Son of Chico Dusty	Debuted at No. 3 on the Billboard 200
July 6	Juvenile	Beast Mode	Debuted at No. 55 on the Billboard 200
July 6	Lil' Flip	Ahead of My Time	
July 6	Rick Ross	The Albert Anastasia EP	
July 13	Capone-N-Noreaga	The War Report 2	Debuted at No. 98 on the Billboard 200
July 13	Paul Wall	Heart of a Champion	Debuted at No. 56 on the Billboard 200
July 13	Stat Quo	Statlanta	
July 13	Curren$y	Pilot Talk	Debuted at No. 38 on the Billboard 200
July 13	Pro	Redemption	
July 13	Snoop Dogg	My No. 1 Priority	
July 13	Sam Adams	Boston's Boy (Deluxe Edition)	
July 13	Mr. Criminal	Death Before Dishonor	
July 20	Rick Ross	Teflon Don	Debuted at No. 2 on the Billboard 200; Singles: "Super High", "B.M.F. (Blowing Money Fast)", "Aston Martin Music"; Certified Gold
July 20	Ron Browz	Etherlibrium	
July 20	Ayatollah	Cocoon	
July 20	Rakaa	Crown Of Thorns	
July 20	Ras Kass & DJ Rhettmatic	A.D.I.D.A.S. (All Day I Dream About Spittin’)	
July 20	Potluck	Greatest Hits with My Buds	
July 27	Tech N9ne	The Gates Mixed Plate	Debuted at No. 13 on the Billboard 200
July 27	Fat Joe	The Darkside Vol. 1	Debuted at No. 27 on the Billboard 200
July 27	Slum Village	Villa Manifesto	Debuted at No. 171 on the Billboard 200
July 27	Madlib	Madlib Medicine Show No. 7: High Jazz	
July 27	Killah Priest	The 3 Day Theory	
July 27	Cut Chemist	Sound Of The Police	
July 27	Bizzy Bone	Crossover: 2010 EP	
July 27	Krayzie Bone	The Fixtape Volume 3: Lyrical Paraphernalia	
July 27	Trek Life	Everything Changed Nothing	
July 27	Zo!	SunStorm	
July 27	Willie the Kid & Lee Bannon	Never A Dull Moment: The EP	
August 1	Mistachuck	Don’t Rhyme For The Sake Of Riddlin’	
August 3	Bun B	Trill O.G.	Debuted at No. 4 on the Billboard 200
August 3	Freddie Gibbs	Str8 Killa	Debuted at No. 48 on the Billboard Top R&B/Hip-Hop Albums
August 3	Pastor Troy	King of All Kings	
August 3	Esham	Suspended Animation	
August 3	El-P	Weareallgoingtoburninhellmegamixxx3	
August 3	Lil' Keke	The Don Ke Chronicles	
August 3	Roc C	Scapegoat	
August 3	King Gordy	Xerxes The God-King	
August 3	Messy Marv, The Jacka & Blanco	Jonestown	
August 5	Del the Funky Homosapien	It Ain't Illegal Yet	
August 10	Dirt Nasty	Nasty As I Wanna Be	
August 10	Ahmad	The Death Of Me	
August 10	DJ Screw	Forever	
August 10	GRITS	Quarantine	
August 10	LMNO	Tripping On This Journey	
August 10	Ayatollah	Live From The MPC 60 (Box Set)	
August 10	Messy Marv	Thizz City	
August 10	Buck 65	20 Odd Years Volume 3: Albuquerque	
August 10	Bun B & DJ Michael “5000” Watts	Trill O.G. (Screwed & Chopped)	
August 10	Lord Infamous	Futuristic Rowdy Bounty Hunter	
August 13	Mac Miller	K.I.D.S.	
August 17	D-Loc	Made For Kings	
August 17	Camu Tao	King Of Hearts	
August 17	Mac Dre	G.A.M.E.	
August 17	Messy Marv & Berner	Blow: Blocks And Boat Docks	
August 17	Crooked I	Planet C.O.B. Vol. 1	
August 17	Husalah	Tha Furly Ghost Volume 3	
August 17	Tha Dogg Pound	100 Wayz	
August 17	Raekwon	Only Built 4 Cuban Linx... Pt. II (Gold Deluxe Edition)	
August 17	Bizzy Bone	The Best Of Bizzy Bone Vol. 2	
August 24	Blu	Her Favorite Colo(u)r (Re-Release)	
August 24	Messy Marv	Thizz City	
August 24	The Pack	Wolfpack Party	
August 24	Bizzy Bone	Crossroads: 2010	
August 24	Tek	24KT Smoke	
August 24	Apollo Brown	The Reset (Instrumentals)	
August 24	Jneiro Jarel	Fauna (International Release)	
August 24	Cassidy	Face 2 Face Ep	
August 31	Big L	139 & Lenox	
August 31	Common Sense	Resurrection (Deluxe Edition)	
August 31	DJ Muggs & Ill Bill	Kill Devil Hills	
August 31	Fabolous	There Is No Competition 2: The Grieving Music EP	Debuted at No. 32 on the Billboard 200; Single: "You Be Killing Em"
August 31	KRS-One & True Master	Meta-Historical	
August 31	Godfather Don	Properties Of Steel: The Hydra Records Singles	
August 31	Madlib	Madlib Medicine Show No. 8: Advanced Jazz	
August 31	Tela	Gators & Suits	
August 31	Kano	Method To The Maadness (International Release)	
August 31	Whodini	Whodini (Re-Release)	
August 31	Exile	Radio: AM/FM	
August 31	Fes Taylor	I’m Not A Rapper!	
September 7	Chingy	Success & Failure	
September 7	Young Buck	The Rehab	Debuted at No. 55 on the Billboard 200
September 7	Q-Unique	Between Heaven & Hell	
September 7	Nate Dogg	G-Funk Mix	
September 7	Dorrough	Get Big	Debuted at No. 67 on the Billboard 200; Singles: "Get Big"
September 7	Rock & Suge White	Rockin Out West	
September 7	Atmosphere	To All My Friends, Blood Makes The Blade Holy: The Atmosphere EP's	Debuted at No. 37 on the Billboard 200
September 7	September 10	Harlem 6	The New Breed
September 14	Krizz Kaliko	Shock Treatment	Debuted at No. 97 on the Billboard 200
September 14	Huey	Redemption	
September 14	Black Milk	Album of the Year	Debuted at No. 129 on the Billboard 200
September 14	J Dawg	Still Behind Tint	
September 14	MF Doom & Big Benn Klingon	Expektoration Live	
September 14	Watchmen	Wu-Tang Management Presents Watchmen	
September 14	Rah Digga	Classic	
September 14	Pete Rock & CL Smooth	Mecca and the Soul Brother (Deluxe Edition)	
September 15	Dirt Platoon	Deeper Than Dirt	
September 20	Witchdoctor	Dracula “Transylvania”	
September 21	Twiztid	Heartbroken & Homicidal	Debuted at No. 29 on the Billboard 200
September 21	MC Eiht	The Best Of MC Eiht	
September 21	Prospect	First Blood	
September 21	Ski Beatz	24 Hour Karate School	
September 21	Spice 1	The Best Of Spice 1 Vol. 2	
September 27	Lil Wayne	I Am Not a Human Being	Debuted at No. 2 on the Billboard 200, peaked at No. 1; Singles: "Right Above It"; Certified Gold; Released while Lil Wayne was serving a prison sentence
September 28	Hell Razah	Heaven Razah	
September 28	Lecrae	Rehab	Debuted at No. 17 on the Billboard 200
September 28	Kane & Abel	Back On Money	
September 28	Group Home	G.U.R.U. (Gifted Unlimited Rhymes Universal)	
September 28	Gucci Mane	The Appeal: Georgia's Most Wanted	Debuted at No. 4 on the Billboard 200; Singles: "Gucci Time"
September 28	Timbo King	From Babylon To Timbuktu	
September 28	Boogie Down Productions	Criminal Minded (Elite Edition)	
September 28	Boosie Badazz	Incarcerated	Debuted at No. 13 on the Billboard 200
September 28	Ice Cube	I Am the West	Debuted at No. 22 on the Billboard 200
September 28	Trae Tha Truth, Evil Empire, & DJ Folk	Can’t Ban Tha Truth	
September 28	Thug Lordz	Thug Money	
September 28	Big Remo	Entrapment	
September 28	B-Real	The Harvest Vol. 1: The Mixtape	
September 28	Brown Study	Brown Study	
September 28	Count Bass D & DJ Pocket	Activity	
September 28	DJ Spinna & BBE Soundsystem	Strange Games & Funky Things Volume 5	
September 28	Donnis	Fashionably Late	
September 28	J-Bo	Herringbone Jones	
September 28	Koopsta Knicca	A Murder In Room 8	
September 28	Madlib & Nitti	Madlib Medicine Show No. 9: High Fi Sounds For Smokers And Drinkers	
September 29	Noah23	Heart of Rock	
September 30	Black Knights	West Coast Killa Beez (The Stolen Legacy Vol. 1)	
October 1	Tinie Tempah	Disc-Overy	Debuted at No. 1 on the UK Albums Chart
October 1	Bag Raiders	Bag Raiders	
October 4	Soprano	La Colombe	Debuted at No. 1 on the France Albums Chart
October 5	B.G.	Hollyhood	
October 5	Canibus	C of Tranquility	
October 5	Pimp C	The Naked Soul of Sweet Jones	Debuted at No. 25 on the Billboard 200
October 5	Skyzoo & Illmind	Live from the Tape Deck	Debuted at No. 174 on the Billboard 200
October 5	Savage	The Tribal Council	
October 5	Waka Flocka Flame	Flockaveli	Debuted at No. 6 on the Billboard 200; Singles: "O Let's Do It", "Hard in Da Paint", "No Hands", "Groove St. Party"
October 5	8Ball & MJG	From the Bottom 2 the Top	
October 5	Hezekiah	Conscious Porn	
October 5	Bone Brothers	The Best of Bone Brothers	
October 10	The Gaslamp Killer	Death Gate	
October 10	LMNO	James Kelly (Box Set)	
October 12	¡Mayday!	Stuck On An Island	
October 12	Pac Div	Grown Kid Syndrome	
October 12	Cali Swag District	The Kickback	Single: "Teach Me How to Dougie"
October 12	Illmind	Behind The Curtain	
October 12	9th Prince	One Man Army	
October 12	El Da Sensei & The Returners	GT2: Nu World	
October 12	GLC	Love, Life & Loyalty	
October 12	Lord Jamar	Known Associates	
October 12	Pigeon John	Dragon Slayer	
October 12	7L & Esoteric	1212	
October 12	Chiddy Bang	Chiddy Bang: The Preview	Debuted at No. 75 on the Billboard 200
October 12	Tha Chill	Chillafornia EP	
October 12	Far East Movement	Free Wired	Debuted at No. 24 on the Billboard 200; Singles: "Like a G6", "Rocketeer", "If I Was You (OMG)"
October 12	Vado	Slime Flu	
October 12	The HoodStarz	Controversy	
October 12	Kaz Kyzah & Ammbush	Deadly Operation	
October 12	Nems	Prezident’s Day	
October 19	Pastor Troy	The Best Of Pastor Troy Vol. 1	
October 19	Pastor Troy	The Best Of Pastor Troy Vol. 2	
October 19	The Jacka & Ampichino	Devilz Rejectz 2: House Of The Dead	
October 19	Kokayi	Robots & Dinosaurs	
October 19	Von Pea	Pea’s Gotta Have It	
October 19	The Lost Children of Babylon	Zeitgeist: The Spirit Of The Age	
October 19	Lil' Keke	Seven 13 Vol. 4	
October 19	Lil Scrappy	Prince of the South 2	
October 19	LMNO, KeyKool & 2Mex	Blessing In Disguise	
October 19	Pimp C & DJ Michael “5000” Watts	The Naked Soul of Sweet Jones (Screwed & Chopped)	
October 19	Anybody Killa	Medicine Bag	Debuted at No. 117 on the Billboard 200
October 19	Kinto Sol	El Ultimo Suspiro	
October 20	Ski Beatz	24 Hour Karate School Japan	
October 20	John Forté	The Bloomingdales Acoustics	
October 22	Berlins Most Wanted	Berlins Most Wanted	
October 25	Tech N9ne	Seepage EP	Debuted at No. 57 on Billboard 200
October 25	Lyrics Born	As U Were	
October 25	Various Artists	Stomp The Yard: Homecoming OST	
October 25	Skillz	The World Needs More Skillz	
October 25	Cap D	PolyMath	
October 26	1982	1982	
October 26	9th Wonder	9th's Opus: It's A Wonderful World Music Group Volume 1	
October 26	Celph Titled & Buckwild	Nineteen Ninety Now	
October 26	Chaundon	No Excuses	
October 26	Greg Nice	The Popcycle	
October 26	Madlib	Madlib Medicine Show No. 10: Black Soul	
October 26	Vinnie Paz	Prayer For The Assassin	
October 26	Doc Ish	The First Treatment	
October 26	2Mex	My Fanbase Will Destroy	
October 26	No One	The Substance	
October 26	Wisemen	Children of a Lesser God	
October 26	Lord Infamous & Black Rain Ent.	Helloween Part 2: The Rise Of Satan	
October 26	Nottz	You Need This Music	
October 26	The Left	Gas Mask	
October 31	Koopsta Knicca	Da Devil's Playground 2	
October 31	Spice 1	Hallowpoint	
October 31	Outlawz	Killuminati 2K10	
November 2	Devin the Dude	Gotta Be Me	
November 2	Pitbull	Armando	Debuted at No. 65 on the Billboard 200
November 2	J-Live	Undivided Attention	
November 2	Diplo	Blow Your Head: Dubstep	
November 2	Psycho Les	Psycho Therapy: The Remixes	
November 2	Gangrene	Sawblade EP	
November 2	San Quinn & Loyal-T	Never Say Die	
November 2	Trigganometry	Trigga Happy 3	
November 4	Nocando	Unlocked	
November 5	Ghostface Killah	Supreme Clientele (Special Edition)	
November 9	Eligh	GreyCrow	
November 9	Kid Cudi	Man on the Moon II: The Legend of Mr. Rager	Debuted at No. 3 on the Billboard 200; Singles: "Erase Me"; Certified Gold
November 9	Custom Made	Hi-Def	
November 9	Knoc-turn'al	Knoc's Ville	
November 9	Watchmen	Power	
November 9	Twista	The Perfect Storm	Debuted at No. 42 on the Billboard 200
November 9	Lil Boosie, Webbie, Lil' Trill & Trill Fam	Trill Entertainment Presents: All or Nothing	Debuted at No. 49 on the Billboard 200
November 9	DJ Felli Fel	Thump Ridaz Mix	
November 9	Zion I	Atomic Clock	
November 9	Lord Jamar	Known Associates	
November 9	Lil' Keke	713: The Album	
November 9	Joe Budden	Mood Muzik 4: A Turn 4 The Worst	Debuted at No. 94 on the Billboard 200
November 9	Smoke DZA	George Kush Da Button (The Deluxe Edition)	
November 9	Buckwild	Presents...	
November 9	Criminal Manne	Got That Work	
November 9	Stan Sly	Anutha World	
November 9	Various Artists	Super Jerkin’ Vol. 2	
November 9	Gucci Mane	La Flare	
November 9	Bomb Zombies	Sincerely Yours	
November 9	The Boy Boy Young Me$$	Paystyle Flow: No Pen Vol. 2	
November 9	San Quinn & Loyal-T	Never Say Die	
November 11	Various Artists	Modal Soul Classics II	
November 12	Mystro	Digmund Freud E.P.	
November 16	Nelly	Nelly 5.0	Debuted at No. 10 on the Billboard 200; Singles: "Just a Dream", "Move That Body"
November 16	Berner & Ampichino	Traffic 2	
November 16	Cutthroat	The Takeova	
November 16	LMNO & DJ Babu	No Apologies	
November 16	Cassidy	C.A.S.H. (Cass A Straight Hustla)	Debuted at No. 116 on the Billboard 200
November 16	Bizzy Bone	The Greatest Rapper Alive	
November 16	Masta Killa	Wu-Tang: The Next Chamber	
November 16	John Regan	Sorry I'm Late	
November 16	Messy Marv	D.I.N.O.S.A.U.R. The Collection Volume One	
November 16	J-Zone	A Job Ain’t Nuthin But Work (Deluxe Edition)	
November 19	Hopsin	Raw	
November 19	The Beatnuts	Street Level (Deluxe Edition)	
November 22	Kanye West	My Beautiful Dark Twisted Fantasy	Debuted at No. 1 on the Billboard 200; Singles: "Power", "Runaway", "All of the Lights", and "Monster"; Certified Platinum
November 22	Nicki Minaj	Pink Friday	Debuted at No. 2 on the Billboard 200.; Singles: "Check It Out", "Your Love", "Right Thru Me", "Moment 4 Life", "Fly", "Did It on Em", "Super Bass" and "Roman's Revenge"; Certified Platinum
November 22	Yelawolf	Trunk Muzik 0-60	Debuted at No. 164 on Billboard 200.
November 22	Phanatik	Party Over Here	
November 22	Jay-Z	The Hits Collection, Volume One	
November 22	Gangrene	Gutter Water	
November 22	Duke Da God	The D.I.P. Agenda	
November 22	Curren$y	Pilot Talk II	Debuted at No. 83 on Billboard 200.
November 22	Lloyd Banks	H.F.M. 2 (The Hunger for More)	Debuted at No. 25 on Billboard 200.; Singles: "Beamer, Benz or Bentley", "Any Girl", "Start It Up", "I Don't Deserve You", "So Forgetful".
November 22	Bronze Nazareth	School For The Blindman	
November 22	Rye Rye	Sunshine Remix EP	
November 22	Tabi Bonney	Fre$h	
November 22	Booba	Lunatic	
November 22	Calle 13	Entren Los Que Quieran	
November 23	Inspectah Deck	Manifesto Redux	
November 23	Mr. Capone-E	Gang Stories	
November 23	Big L	Return of the Devil's Son	
November 23	Damu the Fudgemunk	Supply For Demand	
November 23	Maestro Fresh-Wes	The Black Tie Affair (Re-Release)	
November 23	Bubba Sparxxx	Miracle On Gamble Road	
November 23	Esham	Suspended Extended (Subatomic Jetpack Edition)	
November 25	Various Artists	Free Leonard Peltier: Hip Hop's Contribution To The Freedom Campaign	
November 30	Slim Thug	Tha Thug Show	Debuted at No. 78 on the Billboard 200
November 30	Soulja Boy Tell 'Em	The DeAndre Way	Debuted at No. 79 on the Billboard 200
November 30	Nu Jerzey Devil	Behind Closed Doors	
November 30	Flo Rida	Only One Flo (Part 1)	Debuted at No. 107 on the Billboard 200; Singles: "Club Can't Handle Me", "Turn Around (5, 4, 3, 2,1)", "Who Dat Girl"
November 30	Haystak	Easy 2 Hate	
November 30	Daz Dillinger	Matter of Dayz	
November 30	AZ	Doe or Die 15th Anniversary	
November 30	Sleepy D & DJ Fresh	The Tonite Show: Sleep Walking	
November 30	MC Mr. Napkins	The Album	
November 30	Big Hutch	Ef U Hutch	
November 30	Ali Vegas	AutoVegography	
November 30	Bad Seed	Intelligently Ignant	
November 30	Big Hutch	Ef U Hutch	
November 30	Deacon The Villain & Sheisty Khrist	Niggaz With Latitude (N.W.L.)	
November 30	JR & PH7	The Update	
November 30	Copywrite	The Life And Times Of Peter Nelson	
November 30	Big Rich	Built To Last	
December 7	Snowgoons	Kraftwerk	
December 7	Large Professor & Neek The Exotic	Exotic Species	
December 7	DJ Premier & Year Round Records	Get Used To Us	
December 7	Redman	Redman Presents... Reggie	Debuted at No. 118 on the Billboard 200
December 7	T.I.	No Mercy	Debuted at No. 4 on the Billboard 200; Single: "Get Back Up", "I'm Back", "Yeah Ya Know (Takers)", "Got Your Back", "That's All She Wrote"; Certified Gold
December 7	Crown Royale	Crown Royale	
December 7	Philthy Rich & DJ Fresh	My Block: Welcome To Sem City 2	
December 7	Remedy	It All Comes Down To This	
December 7	Madlib	Madlib Medicine Show No. 11: Low Budget High Fi Music	
December 7	DJ Clay	Book Of The Wicked: The Mixtape Vol. 2	
December 7	Father MC	My (Digitally Remastered)	
December 7	Messy Marv	Collabos	
December 14	Sheek Louch	Donnie G: Don Gorilla	
December 14	LMNO	LMNO Is Dead	
December 14	Various Artists	Lost Tapes Of Suave House	
December 14	The Untouchables	Al Capone’s Vault	
December 14	J Stalin	The Real World Part 3	
December 14	Too Short	Respect the Pimpin'	
December 14	Doc Ish	The First Treatment	
December 14	Andre Nickatina & The Jacka	My Middle Name Is Crime EP	
December 14	Andre Nickatina & Smoov-E	The King And Mr. Biscuits	
December 20	WC	That’s What I’m Talking About	
December 20	Gorilla Zoe	I Am Atlanta 3	
December 21	Brand Nubian	Enter The Dubstep Volume 2	
December 21	David Banner & 9th Wonder	Death of a Pop Star	
December 21	Dru Down	Chronicles Of A Pimp	
December 21	Ghostface Killah	Apollo Kids	Debuted at No. 128 on the Billboard 200
December 21	Cyssero	Destined for Greatness	
December 21	Statik Selektah	The Left-Overs (Of What’s To Come...) (EP)	
December 21	Messy Marv	Shooting Range Part 2	
December 21	Mikkey Halsted	The Darkroom	
December 21	Illa J	4 Past Midnite	
December 28	Flame	Captured	Debuted at No. 152 on the Billboard 200
December 28	Planet Asia	Crack Belt Theatre	
December 28	Sha Stimuli	Unsung Vol. 1: The Garden Of Eden	
December 31	Statik Selektah & Termanology	The Evening News EP	

== Highest-charting singles ==
Hip hop singles from any year which charted in the 2010 Top 40 of the Billboard Hot 100
Song	Artist	Project	Peak position
"Nothin' on You"	B.o.B featuring Bruno Mars	B.o.B Presents: The Adventures of Bobby Ray	1
"Love the Way You Lie"	Eminem featuring Rihanna	Recovery	1
"Not Afraid"	Eminem	Recovery	1
"Airplanes"	B.o.B featuring Hayley Williams	B.o.B Presents: The Adventures of Bobby Ray	2
"BedRock"	Young Money featuring Lloyd	We Are Young Money	2
"Just A Dream"	Nelly	5.0	3
"Down on Me"	Jeremih featuring 50 Cent	All About You	4
"Billionaire"	Travie McCoy featuring Bruno Mars	Lazarus	4
"Baby"	Justin Bieber featuring Ludacris	My World 2.0	5
"Right Above It"	Lil Wayne featuring Drake	I Am Not a Human Being	6
"How Low"	Ludacris featuring Shawnna	Battle of the Sexes	6
"Young Forever"	Jay-Z featuring Mr Hudson	The Blueprint 3	10
"My Chick Bad"	Ludacris featuring Nicki Minaj	Battle of the Sexes	11
"Carry Out"	Timbaland featuring Justin Timberlake	Shock Value II	11
"Runaway"	Kanye West featuring Pusha T	My Beautiful Dark Twisted Fantasy	12
"Deuces"	Chris Brown featuring Tyga & Kevin McCall	F.A.M.E.	14
"Your Love"	Nicki Minaj	Pink Friday	14
"Over"	Drake	Thank Me Later	14
"Miss Me"	Drake featuring Lil Wayne	Thank Me Later	15
"Gonnorhea"	Lil Wayne featuring Drake	I Am Not A Human Being	17
"Monster"	Kanye West featuring Jay-Z, Rick Ross, Bon Iver & Nicki Minaj	My Beautiful Dark Twisted Fantasy	18
"Drop the World"	Lil Wayne featuring Eminem	Rebirth	18
"That's All She Wrote"	T.I. featuring Eminem	No Mercy	18
"I Made It (Cash Money Heroes)"	Kevin Rudolf featuring Birdman, Jay Sean & Lil Wayne	To the Sky	21
"POWER"	Kanye West	My Beautiful Dark Twisted Fantasy	22
"Erase Me"	Kid Cudi featuring Kanye West	Man on the Moon II: The Legend of Mr. Rager	22
"Say Something"	Timbaland featuring Drake	Shock Value II	23
"No Love"	Eminem featuring Lil Wayne	Recovery	23
"Check It Out"	will.i.am & Nicki Minaj	Pink Friday	24
"All I Do Is Win"	DJ Khaled featuring T-Pain, Ludacris, Snoop Dogg & Rick Ross	Victory	24
"Fancy"	Drake featuring T.I. & Swizz Beatz	Thank Me Later	25
"Right Thru Me"	Nicki Minaj	Pink Friday	26
"Hello Good Morning"	Diddy & Dirty Money featuring T.I.	Last Train to Paris	27
"Teach Me How To Dougie"	Cali Swag District	The Kickback	28
"Hell Breaks Loose"	Eminem featuring Dr. Dre	Relapse: Refill	29
"Aston Martin Music"	Rick Ross featuring Drake & Chrisette Michele	Teflon Don	30
"Solo"	Iyaz featuring Akon	Replay	32
"Kush"	Dr. Dre featuring Snoop Dogg & Akon	—N/a	34
"Lose My Mind"	Jeezy featuring Plies	Thug Motivation 103: Hustlerz Ambition	35
"On to the Next One"	Jay-Z featuring Swizz Beatz	The Blueprint 3	37
"Got Your Back"	T.I. featuring Keri Hilson	No Mercy	38

== Highest first week sales ==
As of December 31, 2010.

Number	Artist	Album	1st week sales	1st week position
1	Eminem	Recovery	741,000	#1
2	Kanye West	My Beautiful Dark Twisted Fantasy	496,000	#1
3	Drake	Thank Me Later	447,000	#1
4	Nicki Minaj	Pink Friday	375,000	#2
5	Lil Wayne	Rebirth	176,000	#2
6	Rick Ross	Teflon Don	176,000	#2
7	Kid Cudi	Man on the Moon II: The Legend of Mr. Rager	169,000	#3
8	T.I.	No Mercy	159,000	#4
9	Ludacris	Battle of the Sexes	137,000	#1
10	Lil Wayne	I Am Not a Human Being	125,000	#1

== Highest critically reviewed albums (Metacritic) ==
Number	Artist	Album	Average score	Number of reviews	Reference
1	Kanye West	My Beautiful Dark Twisted Fantasy	94	45 reviews	
2	Big Boi	Sir Lucious Left Foot: The Son of Chico Dusty	90	33 reviews	
4	The Roots	How I Got Over	86	23 reviews	
5	Ghostface Killah	Apollo Kids	84	17 reviews	
6	CeeLo Green	The Lady Killer	80	33 reviews	
7	Rick Ross	Teflon Don	79	18 reviews	
8	Gil Scott-Heron	I'm New Here	78	28 reviews	
9	Freeway & Jake One	The Stimulus Package	78	15 reviews	
10	John Legend & The Roots	Wake Up!	77	22 reviews	

== See also ==
- Previous article: 2009 in hip-hop
- Next article: 2011 in hip-hop
