= Psychosocial (disambiguation) =

Psychosocial refers to one's psychological development in and interaction with a social environment.

Psychosocial may also refer to:

- Psychosocial (song), a single by Slipknot
- The Psycho-Social, Chemical, Biological & Electro-Magnetic Manipulation of Human Consciousness, the debut album by Jedi Mind Tricks, often referred to as The Psycho-Social CD
- Psychosocial hypothesis, a UFO theory
