= Lyrical Law =

Studio album by Canibus
- Released: June 24, 2011
- Recorded: 2010–11 (Discs 1 & 2) 1993-95 (Disc 3)
- Genres: Hip-Hop, hardcore rap
- Label: Canibus/Reverse Polarity Studios
- Producers: The Architect, DJ Kru, DJ Immortal

Canibus chronology
C of Tranquility (2010)	Lyrical Law (2011)	Fait Accompli (2014)

Disc 2 Cover

Disc 3: T.H.E.M. Cover

Professional ratings
Review scores
Source	Rating
RapReviews	7/10

Lyrical Law is the eleventh studio album by American rapper Canibus, released on June 24, 2011 over iTunes. Physical copies were shipped independently from his website, CanibusCatalogue.com, starting July 5, 2011. Buyers of the album had a choice of the LP in a sleeve, jewel case CD, or as a Deluxe LP package. The Deluxe Package included an autographed CD in jewel case and two bonus discs. The first bonus disc features artists from Spitboss on completely new material or remixes of Melatonin Magik. The third and final disc is titled Lyrical Warfare and it was recorded in 1993 by The Harolds of Extreme Metaphors (T.H.E.M.) with Webb between Atlanta and Washington, DC. The album songs include feats with Chino XL, K-Solo, K Rino, Killah Priest, Helltah Skeltah, Born Sun and Royce da 5'9"

Just after CanibusCatalogue.com was up and running, fans were able to pre-order the Lyrical Law LP and could also read a letter from Canibus and view the track listing for the album as well, which sold a total of 10 physical copies. This track listing featured "Lullabies of Champions" (which was pulled because of the beat sample rights not being approved). Before release album had aimed dissed to Slaughterhouse members, Royce da 5'9" and Joe Budden (HRSMN attack, Lyrical Law vs Royce da 5'9" and Lyrical Law vs Joe Cupcakes), but then these songs pulled from the album after beef ends, then Canibus and Royce record feat named "Cypher of Bread and Butter".

== Track listing ==
Disc 1
#	Track Name	Featured Artists
1	Lyrical Noir	
2	The Art of Yo	Born Sun, K-Rino
4	The Emerald Cypher	Born Sun, K-Rino, Killah Priest
5	Cypher	Ras Kass, Sole
6	The Cypher of Agartha	Copywrite, Planet Asia
7	The Golden Cypher	K-Rino, Aesop Rock
8	Cypher of Five Mics	Chino XL
9	Cypher of Sun Rocks	Born Sun, Heltah Skeltah
10	The Ghost of Hip Hop's Past	
11	Cypher with Self	
12	Rip the Jacker vs Poet Laureate	

Disc 2
#	Track Name	Featured Artists
1	Money	Classic Pak
2	Brainwash (Reversal Remix)	
3	Emergency Broadcast	Mark Deez
4	Dead by Design (Remix)	
5	We Go Hard	Classic Pak
6	Gold And Bronze (Remix)	The 7 D
7	The Spitboss Cypher	Mark Deez, Passion, Presto, Damo, Legendary
8	Melatonin Magik (Remix)	
9	Dread Alert Part II	Passion, SHI 360, Damo, Lms
10	The Emerald Cypher (Extended)	Killah Priest, Flawless the MC, Born Sun, K-Rino
11	Dragon Of Judah (Remix)	Flawless the MC, Lms
12	Summertime Heat	Classic Pak
13	Where's The Love	Classic Pak
14	The Golden Cypher (Extended)	Ras Kass, K-Solo, Pilot Rai
15	Who You Know	Classic Pak
16	Cypher of Five Mics (Extended)	Chino XL, Flawless the MC
17	Ripperland (Remix)	

Disc 3 (MP3 Online Version): T.H.E.M.
#	Track Name	Featured Artists
1	Introduction To The Group Home	
2	Distortion	T.H.E.M.
3	Vocab	T.H.E.M.
4	No Doubt	T.H.E.M.
5	Literate Lyricists	T.H.E.M.
6	Cypher Dialect Pt 1	T.H.E.M.
7	Cypher Dialect Pt 2	T.H.E.M.
8	5 Lines	T.H.E.M.
9	Lyrical Warfare	T.H.E.M.
10	Real Muthphukaz	T.H.E.M.

Disc 3 (Version with Lyrical Law physical copy): T.H.E.M.
#	Track Name	Featured Artists
1	Introduction To The Group Home	
2	New York Never Sleeps	T.H.E.M.
3	Distortion	T.H.E.M.
4	Vocab	T.H.E.M.
5	No Doubt	T.H.E.M.
6	F*$k A Yard	T.H.E.M.
7	Sprite Commercial	T.H.E.M.
8	Literate Lyricists	T.H.E.M.
9	Cypher Dialect Pt 1	T.H.E.M.
10	Cypher Dialect Pt 2	T.H.E.M.
11	Shout!!!	T.H.E.M.
12	5 Lines	T.H.E.M.
13	Lyrical Warfare	T.H.E.M.
14	Real Muthphukaz	T.H.E.M.
15	Spit A Verse	T.H.E.M.
16	Mad Drama	T.H.E.M.
