= VBD =

VBD may refer to:

- Vector-borne disease, a type of infectious disease
- Violent by Design, an album by Jedi Mind Tricks
- Violent By Design (professional wrestling), a professional wrestling stable in Impact Wrestling
- Voltage at Break-down
