= Where Light Was Created: The Equidivium =

Studio album by The Lost Children of Babylon
- Released: 2001
- Label: Seventh Cathedral Recordings

The Lost Children of Babylon chronology
Where Light Was Created: The Equidivium (2001)	Words From the Duat: The Book of Anubis (2003)

Where Light was Created: The Equidivium is the first album by The Lost Children of Babylon. Released in 2001 on Seventh Cathedral Recordings and later Re-mastered and Re-released on Babygrande Records in 2006. The album contains a conscious style, with lyrics filled with Nuwaubian teachings of Dr. Malachi Z. York and different theories of the creation and destination of the human soul. This album is similar in style to Jedi Mind Tricks "The Psycho-Social, Chemical, Biological & Electro-Magnetic Manipulation of Human Consciousness" album.

== Track listing ==
1. Intro
2. Where The Light Was Created (Chapter 1)
3. Will You Be Prepared? (When The Elohim Return)
4. Egyptian Magic
5. Cosmic Consciousness
6. Gladiators – (with Luminous Flux)
7. As We Become One With The Sun
8. From The Womb OF El Kuluwm
9. Pythagorean Theorum [sic], The
10. Book Of Black Light
11. Mystic Triad, The (Of Atum Re)
12. Heaven's Mirror – (with Luminous Flux/Society Park)
13. Stargate
14. Seven Thunders, The
15. Giving Praise (To Mother Nature)
16. Through The Eyes Of An Embryo
