= Retaliation (song) =

2001 song performed by Jedi Mind Tricks

Single by Jedi Mind Tricks

from the album Violent by Design
- B-side: "Blood Runs Cold"
- Released: 2001
- Recorded: 2000, Onesoul Bedroom, Philadelphia, PA
- Genre: Hip Hop
- Length: 3:44
- Label: Superegular Recordings
- Songwriters: V. Luvineri, J. Bostick, K. Baldwin
- Producer: Stoupe the Enemy of Mankind

Jedi Mind Tricks singles chronology
"Genghis Khan" (2000)	"Retaliation" (2001)	"Animal Rap" (2002)

"Retaliation" is a single by Hip Hop group Jedi Mind Tricks, the third released from their second album Violent by Design, following "Heavenly Divine" and "Genghis Khan". Released in 2001, the single was the group's last release on self-run Superegular Recordings. The following year, the group migrated to Babygrande Records. "Retaliation" contains a musical sample from "El Rio Y Las Rosas" by Rosita Peru, a vocal sample from "Cross My Heart" by Killah Priest, and a vocal sample from "Money in the bank" by Kool G. Rap. The single also contains the edited "Retaliation (Remix)", and the B-Side track "Blood Runs Cold", featuring Heltah Skeltah's Sean Price, both originally only available on this single. Babygrande Records re-released Violent by Design in 2004, including both "Retaliation (Remix)" and "Blood Runs Cold" as bonus tracks.

The "Retaliation" single marked the last appearance from group member Jus Allah on a Jedi Mind Tricks track. By 2002, he had split from the group due to personal conflict, returning the group to its original lineup of Vinnie Paz and Stoupe the Enemy of Mankind. Jus reconciled with the group in 2006, and appeared on the group's 2008 album, A History of Violence.

== Track listing ==
=== A-Side ===
1. "Retaliation" (Dirty Version)
2. "Retaliation" (Instrumental)
3. "Retaliation (Remix)" (Clean Version)
4. "Retaliation (Remix)" (Instrumental)

=== B-Side ===
1. "Blood Runs Cold" (Dirty Version) (feat. Sean Price)
2. "Blood Runs Cold" (Clean Version) (feat. Sean Price)
3. "Blood Runs Cold" (Instrumental)

== Song order ==
=== "Retaliation" ===
- First verse: Jus Allah
- Second verse: Vinnie Paz
- Intro/Outro: Vinnie Paz

=== "Blood Runs Cold" ===
- Intro/First verse: Sean Price
- Second verse: Jus Allah
- Third verse: Vinnie Paz
- Chorus: Vinnie Paz

== Notes ==
- "Retaliation" contains a sample from "El Rio Y Las Rosas" by Rosita Peru.
- "Retaliation" contains a sample from "Cross My Heart" by Killah Priest.
- "Retaliation" contains a sample from "Money in the bank" by Kool G Rap.
- "Retaliation (Remix)" contains a sample from "De Los Amores" by Susana Baca.
- "Blood Runs Cold" contains a sample from "Septiembre Y Usted" by Wilkins.
