= Teach Me How to Dougie =

Single by Cali Swag District

from the album The Kickback
- Released: April 13, 2010
- Recorded: 2009
- Genre: Pop-rap
- Length: 3:58
- Label: Capitol
- Songwriters: Cahron Childs; Corey Fowler; Chanti Glee; Ebony West
- Producer: RunWay Star

Cali Swag District singles chronology
"Teach Me How to Dougie" (2010)	"Where You Are" (2010)

"Teach Me How to Dougie" is the debut single by American hip hop group Cali Swag District. The song was written by Chanti Glee, Cahron Childs, Corey Fowler, and Ebony Star West, and was released digitally on April 13, 2010, through Capitol Records. It was produced by Runway Star for the group's debut studio album, The Kickback (2011). The title refers to the Dougie dance, which originated in Dallas, Texas by rapper Lil' Wil from his song "My Dougie".

"Teach Me How to Dougie" was a commercial success, peaking at number 28 on the Billboard Hot 100, number 9 on the Hot R&B/Hip-Hop Songs chart, and at number 6 on the Hot Rap Songs chart. It was certified platinum in the United States.

The song's accompanying music video was directed by Yolande Geralds, and features Cali Swag and others partying, dancing and skateboarding.

== Composition ==
The song features a metronomic and "cowbell-bolstered" beat. Cali Swag District trades their verses "tag-team" style, bragging about the "Dougie" dance and the "special treatment it earns them from women." Jon Caramanica of The New York Times states that JayAre "stakes out dissenter ground", and quotes the lyric: "Back of the party, I don't really like to boogie / I'm just trying to get bent and meet a thick redbone."

== Critical reception ==
Melanie Bertoldi of Billboard said the track seeks to pick up where "You're a Jerk" and "Crank That" left off, and commented while the dance might leave something to be desired, that the track's "catchy, refreshingly simple hook makes it a no-brainer for repeat play." Jon Caramanica of The New York Times praised the song, especially JayAre's verse, calling him "kinetic", and said he flows "hard on all angles."

== Music video ==
The music video was directed by Yolande Geralds, and was filmed in the group's hometown of Inglewood, California. Aside from showcasing Inglewood's diversity, video features cameos from B-Hamp, New Boyz, and Teyana Taylor, and the late Simone Battle former member of girl group GRL and one time X-Factor Contestant, as well as the members of Cali Swag District dancing, partying and skateboarding in the town. It also includes dancing shots of "bubba", a person referenced in the song because of his ability to do the Dougie. C-Smoove stated:

We enjoyed it because everybody came through. It was like our whole city came, so we pretty much knew everybody and if we didn't, we got to meet them. It was all around fun, because we didn't expect that many people to turn out, even though that's what we were looking for. We hoped for the best, but ... it turned out better than we expected. It was just a good look.

Chris Ryan of MTV Buzzworthy complimented the dance and video, comparing it to Hurricane Chris's "Halle Berry" and Digital Underground's "The Humpty Dance", stating, "Finally, a dance movement that we can actually see ourselves participating in. It's simple, slow and looks fun enough."

== In popular culture ==
In September 2024, Saturday Night Live made a comedy sketch featuring the candidates of the 2024 United States presidential election. One of the characters also present, the Second Gentleman of the United States Doug Emhoff, played by Andy Samberg, entered the stage with the song playing. The song was chosen because of Emhoff's name of endearment given to him by his spouse and the Democratic presidential nominee Kamala Harris being "Dougie".

== Live performances ==
After releasing "Teach Me How to Dougie" in the spring of 2010, Cali Swag District was invited to perform the single on a number of television programs and at various concert settings. They first performed the single at the 2010 102 JAMZ SuperJam at Greensboro Coliseum in Greensboro, North Carolina on May 21, 2010. The group performed the single at the 2010 BET Awards pre-show by 106 and Park which aired live on the network June 27, 2010. On June 30, 2010, they performed at Skeetox, hosted by DJ Skee, at The Roxy in West Hollywood, California. They performed on Fuel TV network's The Daily Habit on July 2, 2010. On July 21, 2010, Cali Swag District performed the hit song at the Entertainer's Basketball Classic at Rucker Park in Harlem, New York City, New York. During the event, the group members also served as judges during a "Teach Me How to Dougie" competition. Cali Swag District performed "Teach Me How to Dougie" live at the Foxy Summer Jam at Crown Coliseum in Fayetteville, North Carolina on July 24, 2010. Again, Cali Swag District performed at the University of California, Irvine, for their annual Shocktoberfest on October 15, 2010. Finally, they helped kick off the 2011 NBA All-Star Weekend on February 18, performing at the Staples Center in Los Angeles, California, which was aired live on TNT.

== Track listing ==
Digital download EP
No.	Title	Writer(s)	Length
1.	"Teach Me How to Dougie" (Clean version)	Yung, JayAre, Smoove Da General, RunWay Star	3:59
2.	"Teach Me How to Dougie" (Explicit version)	Yung, JayAre, Smoove Da General, RunWay Star	3:59
3.	"Teach Me How to Dougie" (Instrumental)	Yung, JayAre, Smoove Da General, RunWay Star	3:59
4.	"Teach Me How to Dougie" (TV version)	Yung, JayAre, Smoove Da General, RunWay Star	3:59
5.	"Teach Me How to Dougie" (acapella)	Yung, JayAre, Smoove Da General, RunWay Star	3:46

=== Remix ===
1. "Teach Me How to Dougie (Remix)" [feat. Jermaine Dupri, B.O.B, Bow Wow & Red Café]
2. "Teach Me How to Dougie (Remix)" [feat. Sean Kingston & B.o.B]
3. "Teach Me how To Dougie (Remix)" [feat. Tyga]

== Charts ==
=== Weekly charts ===
Chart (2010–11)	Peak position
US Billboard Hot 100	28
US Hot R&B/Hip-Hop Songs (Billboard)	9
US Hot Rap Songs (Billboard)	6
US Rhythmic Airplay (Billboard)	12

=== Year-end charts ===
Chart (2010)	Position
US Billboard Hot 100	98
US Hot R&B/Hip-Hop Songs (Billboard)	51

== Certifications ==
Region	Certification	Certified units/sales
New Zealand (RMNZ)	Platinum	30,000^{‡}
United States (RIAA)	Platinum	1,000,000^{*}
^{*} Sales figures based on certification alone.^{‡} Sales+streaming figures based on certification alone.
