= Back to the L.A.B. (Lyrical Ass Beating) =

Back to the L.A.B (Lyrical Ass Beating)

EP by KRS-One
- Released: May 12, 2010
- Recorded: 2010
- Genre: East Coast hip hop, hardcore hip hop
- Label: Digital
- Producer: Da Beatminerz, Freddie Foxxx, JS-1, DJ Kenny Parker, DJ Professor K

KRS-One chronology
Survival Skills (2009)	Back to the L.A.B (Lyrical Ass Beating) (2010)	Meta-Historical (2010)

Professional ratings
Review scores
Source	Rating
RapReviews	(7/10)

Back to the L.A.B (Lyrical Ass Beating) is the fourth solo EP by American rapper KRS-One, released in May 12, 2010.

== Track listing ==
1. Who Da Best
2. Omni-Hood
3. WOLF!
4. Show Shocked
5. Never Afraid
6. TEK-NOLOGY

== Sample credits ==
- "WOLF!" contains a laugh sample from the instrumental song called Operation's Choice by Mikey Dread. The same laugh sample is also included in the Sega arcade video game Streets of Rage 2 which is used for one of the characters you fight against called Big Ben.
