= Heavenly Divine =

Single by Jedi Mind Tricks

from the album Violent by Design
- B-side: "Trinity"
- Released: 1999
- Recorded: 1999, Onesoul Bedroom, Philadelphia, Pennsylvania
- Genre: Hip Hop
- Length: 4:34
- Label: Superegular Recordings
- Songwriters: V. Luvineri, J. Bostick, K. Baldwin
- Producer: Stoupe the Enemy of Mankind

Jedi Mind Tricks singles chronology
"Heavenly Divine" (1999)	"Genghis Khan" (2000)

"Heavenly Divine" is a single by American hip hop group Jedi Mind Tricks, released in mid-1999 through the group's self-run label Superegular Recordings.

== Background ==
The track's violin and background vocals are both sampled from "Andante" by Bobby McFerrin and Yo-Yo Ma. The song marks the debut of New Jersey rapper Jus Allah, who temporarily joined Stoupe and Vinnie Paz as JMT's third member. "Heavenly Divine" was the first single from the group's second album Violent by Design, followed by "Genghis Khan" and "Retaliation". The single's B-Side features the track "Trinity", featuring L-Fudge and Louis Logic, and the edited "Heavenly Divine (Remix)". Both were also featured on Violent by Design .

Known as a "backpacker anthem", "Heavenly Divine" has become recognized as JMT's trademark song. In the Violent by Design: Deluxe Edition album credits, Fat Tony states that the song is a "perfect blend of Jedi Mind's metaphysical, spiritual and street influences." The song marked group vocalist Ikon the Verbal Hologram's transformation into Vinnie Paz, debuting his new gruff, angry delivery and violent lyrics laced with Islamic messages. Aside from the haunting production and aggressive deliveries, the song is also well known for its offensive, unrelenting content, including lyrics such as "I'm with Allah 'cause he chose me, broke into the Vatican, strangled the Pope with his rosary" .

== Track listing ==
=== A-Side ===
1. "Heavenly Divine" (Dirty Version)
2. "Heavenly Divine" (Clean Version)
3. "Heavenly Divine" (Instrumental)

=== B-Side ===
1. "Trinity" (Clean Version) (featuring L-Fudge and Louis Logic)
2. "Trinity" (Instrumental-Trinity)
3. "Heavenly Divine (Remix)"

== Song order ==
=== "Heavenly Divine" ===
- First verse: Vinnie Paz
- Second verse: Jus Allah
- Third verse: Vinnie Paz, Jus Allah
- Chorus: Vinnie Paz, Jus Allah
- Intro/Outro: Vinnie Paz

=== "Trinity" ===
- First verse: L-Fudge
- Second verse: Louis Logic
- Third verse: Vinnie Paz
- Chorus: Vinnie Paz, L-Fudge, Louis Logic

== Notes ==
- "Heavenly Divine" contains a sample from "Andante" by Bobby McFerrin and Yo-Yo Ma.
- "Trinity" contains a sample from "Concerto In D Minor: Allegro" by Tomaso Albinoni.
- "Heavenly Divine (Remix)" contains a sample from "Uninvited" by Alanis Morissette.
