= Fait Accompli (album) =

Studio album by Canibus
- Released: June 10, 2014
- Recorded: 2012–2014
- Genre: Hip-hop
- Length: 70:09
- Label: RBC Records
- Producer: JP Beats

Canibus chronology
Lyrical Law (2011)	Fait Accompli (2014)	Time Flys, Life Dies... Phoenix Rise (2015)

Singles from Fait Accompli
- 1. "Historic" Released: June 3, 2014

Fait Accompli is the twelfth studio album by American rapper Canibus. The album was released on June 10, 2014, by RBC Records. On June 3, 2014, the album's first single "Historic" featuring The HRSMN and Tragedy Khadafi was released.

== Critical response ==
Professional ratings
Review scores
Source	Rating
HipHopDX	3/5 stars

Martin Connor of HipHopDX gave the album three out of five stars, saying "One of the knocks on Canibus over the course of his solo career has been his ear for production. Unfortunately, Fait Accompli does nothing to remedy this opinion. Producer JP Beats and his martial sonic world, full as it is of hard-hitting military snare drums and pugilistic army marching chants, assist Canibus. But sonically, the project falls flat. A lack of variety and overall hollowness plagues each production, as the snares, kicks and low ends all suffer from a dated, cheap sound. Combined with the fact that Canibus largely gives you only this one apocalyptic look, and the lack of versatility in both his delivery and the production, Fait Accompli becomes an increasingly difficult listen."

== Track listing ==
- All songs produced by PP Beats.

No.	Title	Length
1.	"Star Spangled Banger (Intro)"	3:42
2.	"Fait Accompli"	5:09
3.	"Yellow Line"	1:30
4.	"Pay Me In Gold"	3:44
5.	"This Ain't the Movies"	5:23
6.	"The Primary Axiom"	5:37
7.	"Orange Line"	2:33
8.	"Dyson's Fear of Spheres"	6:27
9.	"The Principle of Equivalence"	4:59
10.	"The Rude Boy Oscars"	4:17
11.	"Sinflation"	6:00
12.	"Red Line"	1:38
13.	"The Last Christians"	9:21
14.	"God$Les$ America"	5:34
15.	"Historic" (performed by The HRSMN featuring Tragedy Khadafi)	7:14
16.	"The Future"	3:37
17.	"Star Spangled Banger (Outro)"	2:23

Deluxe edition bonus tracks
No.	Title	Length
18.	"Wreck Room" (featuring Crooked I, Nino Graye, & Flawless The MC)	5:20
19.	"Explanations & Misinflations"	10:23
20.	"Make a Sound"	4:13
21.	"Dutty Desparados" (featuring Vybz Kartel)	3:34
22.	"Robot Makers"	4:51
23.	"Pay Me In Gold (Remix)" (featuring Pyrit)	5:10
