= The Lost Children of Babylon =

American hip hop group

- Origin: Philadelphia, Pennsylvania
- Genres: Alternative hip hop, Conscious hip hop
- Years active: 1996–present
- Labels: Seventh Cathedral Recordings; LCOB Productions
- Members: Breath of Judah; Rasul Allah (El Eloh); Cosmic Crusader; Ancient Kemet; Jon Murdock; Atun Sen Geb; Lex Starwind; Amos the Ancient Prophet; Richard Raw; Stretch The Mad Scientist
- Website: lcobproductions.com/blog/

The Lost Children of Babylon logo

The Lost Children of Babylon (LCOB) are a spiritual alternative hip hop music group based out of Philadelphia, Pennsylvania. The group was founded by Rasul Allah and The Breath Of Judah in the mid 1990s and first appeared in 1996 on the Jedi Mind Tricks' Amber Probe. The original core members are Rasul Allah, The Breath of Judah, Richard Raw, Cosmic Crusader and Ancient Kemet. Their messages are influenced by Nuwaubian philosophy, Islam, and the Nation of Gods and Earths; their subject matter draws from such topics as revolutionary politics, physics, philosophy, spirituality, science fiction, and mythology, of various traditions.

== Career ==
=== First appearance ===
The Lost Children of Babylon entered the hip hop-scene in 1996 with an appearance on Jedi Mind Tricks’ debut EP, the Amber Probe, where they appeared on the song "Communion: The Crop Circle Thesis". They also contributed verses on four more songs on Jedi Mind Tricks’ 1997 debut album, The Psycho-Social, Chemical, Biological & Electro-Magnetic Manipulation of Human Consciousness: "Chinese Water Torture", "The Three Immortals", "As It Was In The Beginning" and "Books of Blood: The Coming Of Tan".

=== Where Light Was Created: The Equidivium ===
Their first album was released on Seventh Cathedral Recordings in 2001. They debuted with a conscious style, with lyrics filled with Nuwaubian teachings of Dr. Malachi Z. York and different theories of the creation and destination of the human soul. This album is similar in style to Jedi Mind Tricks "Psycho-social LP".

=== Words From The Duat: The Book Of Anubis ===
For their second album, LCOB changed their name to "The Lost Children of Egypt" on request of Dr. Malachi Z. York. This name change reflects a concept change on the album, which is more focused on Egyptian philosophy and mythology.

=== The 911 Report: The Ultimate Conspiracy ===
LCOB's third album consists of 19 tracks about the September 11, 2001 attacks on the World Trade Center. The band became more political, choosing to proselytize about world politics rather than Egyptian mysticism. Some controversy occurs, since they condemn the terrorists, yet also George W. Bush and his administration for purportedly enabling the circumstances of 9/11. The album examines both the conspiracies about 9/11 and the facts of the event.

Their recent releases were put out on the internet called "Prelude To "The Appendices" (a promo to the upcoming album "The Appendices: The Scroll Of Lost Tales"), "The Lost Tapes", and a prelude to the upcoming album "Zeitgeist: The Spirit Of The Age". Several members have also announced solo debuts to be released in a near future. Richard Raw has already released his first album entitled "My City, A Place Where Somebody Can Be Nobody" and several other mixtapes that were released on the internet.

== Discography ==
=== Albums ===
Album information
Where Light Was Created: The Equidivium
- Released: 2001 (Re-issued 2003, Re-mastered 2004 and Re-released 2006 on Babygrande Records)
- Label: Seventh Cathedral Recordings
- Singles:
Words From the Duat: The Book of Anubis
- Released: 2003 (Re-mastered 2004 and Re-released 2006 on Babygrande Records)
- Label: Seventh Cathedral Recordings
- Singles:
The 911 Report: The Ultimate Conspiracy
- Released: 2005 (Re-released 2006 on Babygrande Records)
- Label: Seventh Cathedral Recordings
- Singles:
Zeitgeist: The Spirit Of The Age
- Released: November 30, 2010 (October 19, 2010 on iTunes)
- Label: LCOB Productions/Chambermusik/Soul Kid Records
- Singles:
Tower of Babel
- Released: 2011
- Label: LCOB Productions
- Singles:
El's Appendices: The Scroll Of Lost Tales
- Released: December 13, 2011
- Label: LCOB Productions/Fat Beats
- Singles:

=== Singles ===
Album information
"Never Die - The Lost Children of Babylon"
- Released: 2006
- Label: Babygrande Records
- B-Side: "Mujahadin
