= Genghis Khan (Jedi Mind Tricks song) =

2000 single by Jedi Mind Tricks

Single by Jedi Mind Tricks Featuring. Tragedy Khadafi

from the album Violent by Design
- Released: 2000
- Recorded: 2000, Onesoul Bedroom, Philadelphia, PA
- Genre: Hip hop
- Length: 3:50
- Label: Superegular Recordings
- Songwriter(s): V. Luvineri, J. Bostick, P. Chapman, K. Baldwin
- Producer(s): Stoupe the Enemy of Mankind

Jedi Mind Tricks Featuring. Tragedy Khadafi singles chronology
"Heavenly Divine" (1999)	"Genghis Khan" (2000)	"Retaliation" (2001)

"Genghis Khan" is a single by hip hop group Jedi Mind Tricks. The original press, distributed through JMT's Superegular Recordings, was released as a promo in early 2000. The group's second and former label, Babygrande Records, re-released the single in 2003 with wider distribution. The track is named after 13th century Mongol leader Genghis Khan. The song contains a sample from "Downloading", a symphonic composition by Harald Kloser, taken from the film The Thirteenth Floor.

"Genghis Khan" was the second single released from the group's second album, Violent by Design, preceded by 1999's "Heavenly Divine", and followed by 2001's "Retaliation". The song features a guest appearance from underground veteran Tragedy Khadafi, who provides the third verse and the chorus. A sequel to the song, "Kublai Khan", named after Genghis' grandson, was released as a single in 2003, and included on the group's third album, Visions of Gandhi.

== Track listing ==
=== A-side ===
1. "Genghis Khan" (Street Version) (feat. Tragedy Khadafi)
2. "Genghis Khan" (Clean Version) (feat. Tragedy Khadafi)

=== B-side ===
1. "Genghis Khan" (Instrumental)
2. "Genghis Khan" (Accapella) (feat. Tragedy Khadafi)

== Song order ==
- First verse: Jus Allah
- Second verse: Vinnie Paz
- Third verse: Tragedy Khadafi
- Chorus: Tragedy Khadafi, Vinnie Paz
- Intro/Outro: Tragedy Khadafi
