= Animal Rap =

Single by Jedi Mind Tricks

from the album Visions of Gandhi
- Released: 2002, 2003
- Recorded: 2002
- Genre: Hip hop
- Length: 3:39 (Arturo Gatti Mix); 4:01 (Micky Ward Mix)
- Label: Babygrande
- Songwriters: V. Luvineri, N. Wilson, K. Baldwin
- Producer: Stoupe the Enemy of Mankind

Jedi Mind Tricks singles chronology
"Retaliation" (2001)	"Animal Rap" (2002)	"Kublai Khan" (2003)

"Animal Rap" is the lead single by hip hop group Jedi Mind Tricks from their third album Visions of Gandhi (2003). The first vinyl pressing was released in 2002 and the CD pressing was released in 2003. The single was the group's first release on Babygrande Records. There are two versions of the song; "Animal Rap (Arturo Gatti Mix)" and "Animal Rap (Micky Ward Mix)"—both referencing the rivalry between the boxers. The former features an intense orchestral sample (incidental music from the film The Bonfire of the Vanities), matched with Mike Tyson interview clips, and the latter features a melancholy guitar loop, matched with a light, sung vocal sample.

The song features a guest appearance by Kool G Rap, who is considered by Jedi Mind Tricks vocalist Vinnie Paz to be "the greatest of all time". The CD version of the single features a bonus Vinnie Paz interview, conducted by "Fat Tony the Ill Sicilian". While Visions of Gandhi received mixed reviews by critics, "Animal Rap" was well received by fans and critics, and was considered to be a standout track on the album. The "Arturo Gatti" version was featured on the album, listed plainly as "Animal Rap", while the "Micky Ward" version was included as a hidden bonus track.

== Track listing ==
1. "Animal Rap (Arturo Gatti Mix)" (dirty version)
2. "Animal Rap (Micky Ward Mix)" (dirty version)
3. "Animal Rap (Arturo Gatti Mix)" (clean version)
4. "Animal Rap (Micky Ward Mix)" (clean version)
5. "Animal Rap (Arturo Gatti Mix)" (instrumental)
6. "Animal Rap (Micky Ward Mix)" (instrumental)
7. "Animal Rap" (a cappella)
8. "Vinnie Paz Interview with Fat Tony the Ill Sicilian"

== Song order ==
- Intro: Kool G Rap, Vinnie Paz
- First verse: Kool G Rap
- Second verse: Vinnie Paz
- Outro: Vinnie Paz, Kool G Rap
