= Godsville =

Studio album by Show and KRS-One
- Released: February 15, 2011 (digital); March 8, 2011 (CD/LP)
- Recorded: September 2010–January 2011
- Studios: Headquarterz Studio (New York, NY)
- Genre: Hip-hop
- Length: 35:16
- Label: D.I.T.C.
- Producers: Showbiz (also exec.); E-Blaze

KRS-One chronology
Meta-Historical (2010)	Godsville (2011)	Royalty Check (2011)

Professional ratings
Review scores
Source	Rating
HipHopDX	3/5
RapReviews	5/10

Godsville is a collaborative studio album by American record producer Showbiz and rapper KRS-One. It was released digitally on February 15, 2011, via D.I.T.C. Records; although the physical release didn't hit stores until May 8, 2011. The recording sessions took place at Headquarterz Studio in New York. The album was produced by Showbiz, with one track produced with Show's Born Lords groupmate E-Blaze. It features guest appearances from Fred the Godson and Jay Nortey.

It is the second album produced by Show excluding his work with Showbiz and A.G. and the 21st album by KRS-One (including his work with Boogie Down Productions). It follows the theme of KRS-One creating an album fully produced by a legendary New York producer, following Hip Hop Lives with Marley Marl and Meta-Historical with True Master.

== Track listing ==
- All tracks produced by Rodney "Showbiz" Lemay, except for track 6 produced with Eric "E-Blaze" Blaze.

No.	Title	Length
1.	"Intro"	1:24
2.	"Improve Myself"	3:19
3.	"Show Power"	2:48
4.	"We Love This" (featuring Fred the Godson)	3:47
5.	"This Flow"	2:27
6.	"The Truth"	2:36
7.	"Legendary"	2:42
8.	"Hear Me More"	1:43
9.	"Running in the Dark"	3:21
10.	"Improve Myself (Touch Version)"	2:55
11.	"Another Day" (featuring Jay Nortey)	3:08
12.	"Show Power [Park Jam Mix]" (CD exclusive)	2:56
13.	"Another Day [Park Jam Mix]" (CD exclusive)	2:56
14.	"Loving You"	3:26
Total length:		39:29
