= Dougie =

Hip hop dance

External videos
- Cali Swag District teaches you how to Dougie (Dance Lesson) posted on Aug 26, 2010

The signature hand move of the Dougie dance

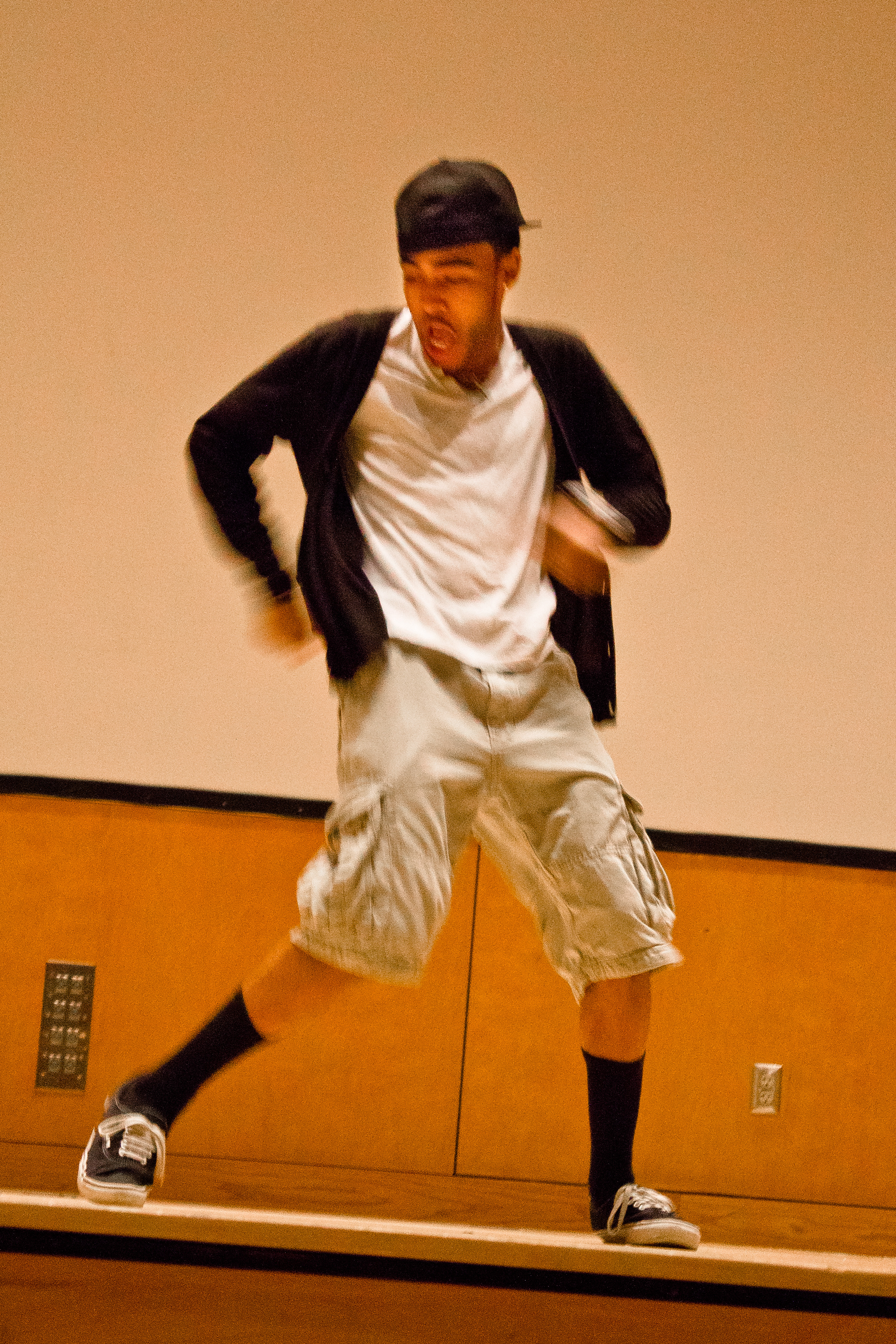
University student performs the Dougie during a talent show

The Dougie (/ˈdʌɡi/ DUG-ee) is a hip hop dance move generally performed by moving one's body from side to side and passing a hand through or near the hair on one's own head.

The dance move originated in Dallas, Texas, where it took its name from similar moves performed by 1980s rapper Doug E. Fresh. The Dougie gained notoriety through rapper Lil' Wil, whose song "My Dougie", released in late 2007, became a local hit. Then, a person called C-Smoove in Southern California taught the future members of Cali Swag District how to do the dance. Cali Swag District recorded the song "Teach Me How to Dougie" and filmed the music video in Inglewood, California during the summer of 2009. Subsequently, the video along with the dance became popular on YouTube.

In 2011, Montae Ray Talbert, known as "M-Bone" of Cali Swag District, was killed in his car by an unidentified gunman. According to the Cali Swag District spokesman, Greg Miller, "He was the best at doing the dance, and on tour he was always the one in the forefront … He helped bring it to the masses." At the funeral, mourners did the dance for a tribute video, and Talbert's grandmother did it as part of her eulogy.

In late 2010 and throughout 2011-2025, the Dougie was performed by a number of athletes and celebrities, including Brock Purdy, Chris Brown, Henri Lansbury, Reggie Bush, Dez Bryant, DeMarcus Cousins and Hassan Whiteside, Glen "Big Baby" Davis, Nate Robinson, John Wall, Braylon Edwards, Gaël Monfils, Wolf Blitzer, Kate Upton, and Michelle Obama. In 2012, gymnast Gabby Douglas performed the Dougie upon winning the U.S. Olympic trials and 2012 Summer Olympics U.S. gymnastics team gold and vault silver-medalist McKayla Maroney taught Jenna Hager, daughter of former President of the United States George W. Bush, how to do the Dougie while the gymnastics team was touring London on top of a doubledecker bus.
