= Dolla =

Dolla may refer to:

- Dolla (rapper) (1987–2009), American rapper
- Dolla, County Tipperary
- "Dolla", a song by Fort Minor from the 2006 single S.C.O.M. / Dolla / Get It / Spraypaint & Ink Pens
- Dolla (girl group)

== See also ==
- Dom Dolla
- Dame D.O.L.L.A.
- Top Dolla
- Dollar (disambiguation)
