= Lil' Wil =

American rapper

- Born: Wilbert C. Martin; March 25, 1987 (age 39); New Orleans, Louisiana, U.S.
- Origin: Dallas, Texas, U.S.
- Genres: Hip hop
- Occupation: Rapper
- Years active: 2007–present
- Label: Rudeboy Ent/Unauthorized Ent Asylum
- Website: http://www.lilwil.com

Lil Wil (born Wilbert C. Martin, March 25, 1987) is an American rapper. In late 2007, he released the single "My Dougie", which featured the Dougie dance named after rapper Doug E. Fresh. "My Dougie" was the lead-off single to his debut album Dolla$, TX, which was released in June 2008 by Asylum Records executive producer Pimp-n-Keys Ent. The song also charted on four Billboard singles charts, and made #3 on Billboard's Top Heatseekers chart.

== Discography ==
=== Studio albums ===
- 2008: Dolla$, TX

=== Official mixtapes ===
- 2009: Dope Boi Fresh (with DJ Fletch)
- 2010: The Interview (with DJ Q)
- 2012: 100% Wil (with Definition DJ K Roc)

=== Singles ===
List of singles, with selected chart positions, showing year released and album name
Title	Year	Peak chart positions			Album
Title	Year	US Bub.	US R&B	US Rap	Album
"My Dougie"	2007	19	35	16	Dolla$, TX
"Bust It Open"	2008	—	56	21	Dolla$, TX
"—" denotes a recording that did not chart.
