= Classic (Rah Digga album) =

Studio album by Rah Digga
- Released: September 14, 2010
- Studio: The Durt Factory Studio (Norfolk, VA)
- Genre: Hip-hop
- Length: 33:02
- Label: Raw Koncept
- Producer: Nottz

Rah Digga chronology
| Dirty Harriet (2000) | Classic (2010) |

Singles from Classic
- 1. "This Ain't No Lil' Kid Rap" Released: June 15, 2010; 2. "Straight Spittin IV" Released: September 7, 2010; 3. "Look What You Done Started" Released: September 14, 2010

Professional ratings
Review scores
| Source | Rating |
|---|---|
| AllMusic | 3.5/5 stars |
| Beats Per Minute | 74/100% |
| HipHopDX | 4/5 |
| RapReviews | 6/10 |
| Spin | 7/10 marks |

Classic is the second solo album by American rapper Rah Digga. It was released on September 14, 2010 via Raw Koncept. Recorded at the Durt Factory Studio in Norfolk, Virginia, it was entirely produced by Nottz. The album debuted at number 83 on the Top R&B/Hip-Hop Albums chart in the United States. It was preceded by a three-track extended play A Prelude to a Classic, released on February 24, 2010, and three singles, "This Ain't No Lil' Kid Rap", "Straight Spittin IV" and "Look What You Done Started".

== Track listing ==
All tracks are written by Rashia Fisher and Dominick Lamb.

| No. | Title | Length |
|---|---|---|
| 1. | "The Book of Rashia" | 2:36 |
| 2. | "Who Gonna Check Me Boo" | 3:23 |
| 3. | "This Ain't No Lil' Kid Rap" | 3:13 |
| 4. | "Straight Spittin IV" | 2:22 |
| 5. | "Classic" | 3:10 |
| 6. | "Solidified" | 3:55 |
| 7. | "Feel Good" | 3:20 |
| 8. | "Viral" | 3:54 |
| 9. | "Back It Up" | 3:10 |
| 10. | "You Got It" | 3:59 |
| Total length: | | 33:02 |

iTunes bonus track
| No. | Title | Length |
|---|---|---|
| 11. | "Look What You Done Started" | 4:05 |

Amazon bonus track
| No. | Title | Length |
|---|---|---|
| 12. | "Smokin My Life Away" | 2:50 |

Deluxe edition bonus tracks
| No. | Title | Producer(s) | Length |
|---|---|---|---|
| 13. | "Check Me Boo" (9th Wonder Remix) | 9th Wonder | 4:08 |
| 14. | "No Lil Kid Rap Remix" (featuring Redman) | Nottz | 3:15 |
| 15. | "Straight Spittin 4.5" (Marco Polo Remix) | Marco Polo | 1:49 |
| 16. | "Solidified" (Khrysis Remix) | Khrysis | 3:38 |
| 17. | "You Got It Remix" (featuring Torae and Styles P) | Nottz | 4:00 |

== Personnel ==
- Rashia "Rah Digga" Fisher — vocals, executive producer
- Dominick "Nottz" Lamb — producer, co-executive producer
- Darryl Sloan — co-executive producer
- Lucas Zimmer — A&R

== Charts ==
| Chart (2010) | Peak position |
|---|---|
| US Top R&B/Hip-Hop Albums (Billboard) | 83 |
