= Riley Martin =

American radio personality (1946–2015)

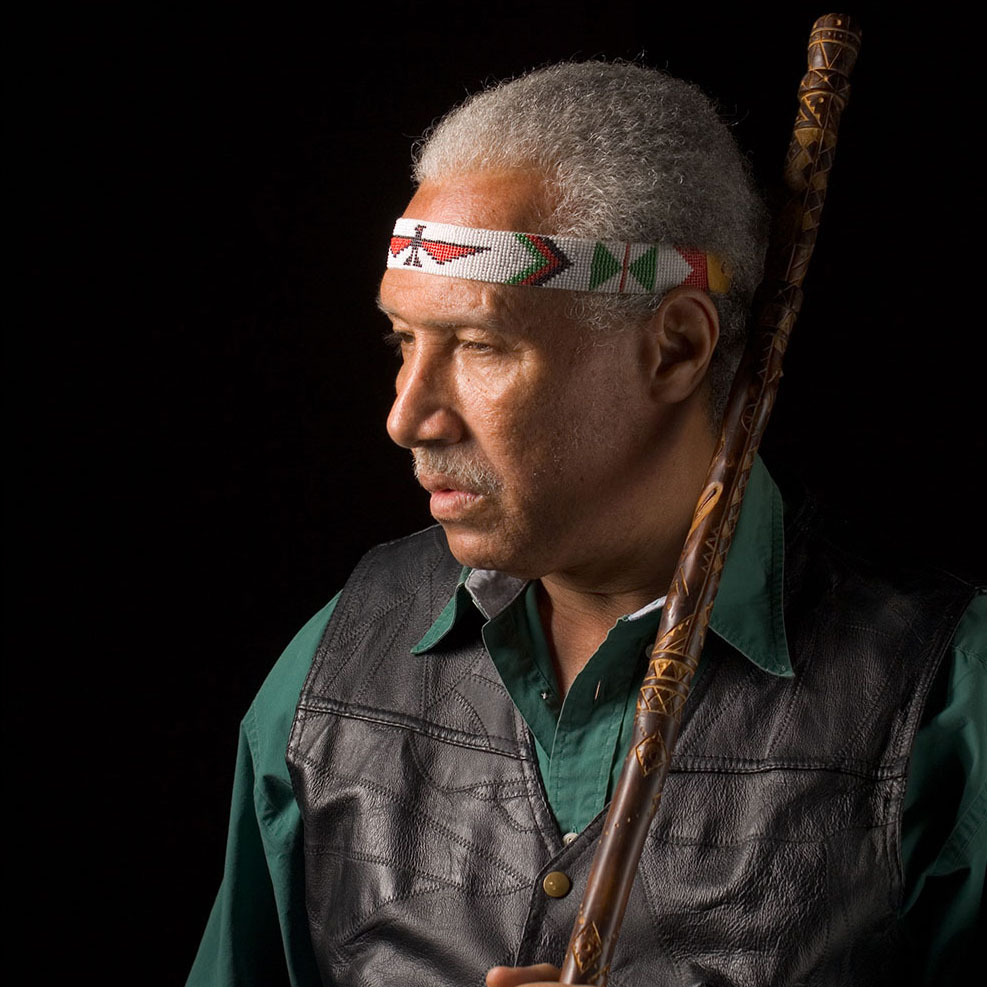
- Born: Riley Lee Martin; May 9, 1946; Natchez, Mississippi, U.S.
- Died: December 22, 2015 (aged 69); Bethlehem, Pennsylvania, U.S.
- Occupations: Author, radio personality
- Website: Official website

Riley Lee Martin (May 9, 1946 – December 22, 2015) was an American self-described alien contactee, author and radio host. Martin was the author of the book The Coming of Tan, which describes his life and his alleged alien visitation. He hosted The Riley Martin Show on the Sirius XM Radio channel Howard 101. He appeared on The Howard Stern Show and was considered part of the Wack Pack.

== Biography ==
Martin stated on his website that he "was born May 9, 1946, in Mississippi to a family of sharecroppers of African American and Native American descent". He claimed he was first visited by aliens in November 1953, near the St. Francis River while living in Arkansas.

Martin characterized his interaction with the aliens as positive. The Biaviian alien O-Qua Tangin Wann (also known as Tan), is listed as the co-author of his book. He asserted that a significant amount of knowledge was uploaded into his brain by the aliens within a matter of minutes, including 144,000 different alien "symbols".

Martin claimed that these aliens, flying aboard 'The Great mother ship', gave him this knowledge so that he could produce and sell hand-drawings of these symbols, which were to allow passage aboard the Mother Ship when the Earth was to have been 'transformed' in 2012.

According to his website, he had been a regular caller on The Howard Stern Show since 1996. He was given his own show (which he initially announced under the title of Hello Earth) after calling in to The Howard Stern Show on March 13, 2006.

Shortly afterwards, Martin started hosting a weekly Internet radio show, The Official Riley Martin Radio Show, first broadcast on May 2, 2006. It was reportedly broadcast until 2015.

Martin's official Facebook fan page and Twitter feed announced his death on January 5, 2016, although it had occurred in December 2015. The producer of his radio show told TMZ that Martin had died "a few days before Christmas".

== References in other media ==
On their album The Psycho-Social, Chemical, Biological & Electro-Magnetic Manipulation of Human Consciousness, Jedi Mind Tricks released a song titled "Books of Blood: The Coming of Tan" featuring El Eloh. The track is about aliens and features a short speech by Martin.

The plot of season 2, episode 3 of Brickleberry, "Woody's Girl," revolves around a follower of a cult that worships Lord "Tarzishian," which talks about re-joining the "mothership," and chants of "oh-qa-tanzin-wan." There is also a brief appearance of a cult follower that resembles Riley Martin.

Riley Martin was featured in an episode of Rob Dyrdek's Fantasy Factory. and CMT's "My Big Redneck Vacation" reality show.

== See also ==
- Coast to Coast AM
- Extraterrestrial life in culture
- Grey alien
- UFO
