= Zeitgeist: The Spirit of the Age =

Zeitgeist: The Spirit Of The Age

Studio album by The Lost Children of Babylon
- Released: November 30, 2010
- Genre: Hip hop
- Label: Soul Kid Records/Chambermusik

Professional ratings
Review scores
Source	Rating
ThaCorner	2/5 stars

Zeitgeist: The Spirit Of The Age is the fourth album by underground hip hop group The Lost Children of Babylon released November 30, 2010 on Soul Kid Records. The album's theme is focused on the New World order and Illuminati. It was also released October 19 on iTunes. The package comes with a Zeitgeist bonus DVD, a download card for the instrumentals and a free mixtape.

== Track listing ==
1. "The Great Depression"
2. "Allah One Mind"
3. "Men Behind The Curtain" (featuring Tragic Allies)
4. "Skull & Bones"
5. "Babylon AD" (featuring Vengeance)
6. "Illuminazi"
7. "Beware the Zeitgeist"
8. "Esoteric Agenda"
9. "Martial Law"
10. "Drug Wars" (featuring Tragic Allies)
11. "Shadow Government"
12. "Fabled Enemies"
13. "The Venus Project" (featuring Emily Clibourn)
14. "Revolution In Now"
15. "2012 (The Mayan Factor)"
