= Cali Swag District =

American hip hop group

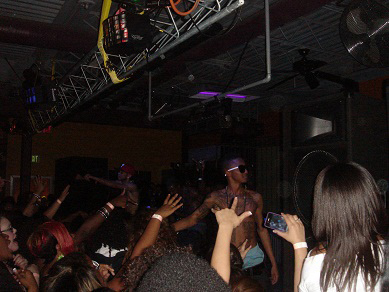
- Cali Swag District performing in 2010

Background information
- Origin: Inglewood, California, U.S.
- Genre: Hip hop
- Years active: 2009–2015
- Labels: Sphinx Music Entertainment, 319 Music Group, Capitol
- Past members: M-Bone; JayAre; OFB Yung; Smoove da General

Cali Swag District was an American hip hop group from Inglewood, California, founded by former Death Row Records artist Big Wy and Dairold Potts. They are best known for their 2010 commercial debut single "Teach Me How to Dougie", which peaked at number 28 on the US Billboard Hot 100 chart and was certified double platinum by the Recording Industry Association of America (RIAA).

== Career ==
=== 2010–2011: The Kickback ===
After originally signing with Capitol Records, Cali Swag District began to record their debut album, The Kickback. They released their debut single, "Teach Me How to Dougie", produced by Runway Star of The Makerz production team on April 13, 2010. It became a commercial success, peaking at twenty-eight on the US Billboard Hot 100, nine on the US Hot R&B/Hip-Hop Songs chart, and six on the US Rap Songs chart. The song's success led the Dougie to become one of the most popular dances of 2010. The song's follow-up, "Where You Are", was released on September 7, 2010. It samples Michael Jackson's 1972 hit, "I Wanna Be Where You Are". The song only managed to peak at forty-five on US R&B charts and twenty-two on US Rap charts. The group's third single, "Kickback", was released on January 18, 2011. The single peaked at ninety-one on the US Hot R&B/Hip-Hop Songs chart. Due to album pushbacks, much of The Kickback was re-worked, resulting in "Where You Are" being cut from it, making "Teach Me How to Dougie" and the title track its first two singles.

With the album delayed and the future of Capitol Records parent company, EMI, unclear, CSD requested to be released from their contract with Capitol. The group eventually signed with Sphinx Music Entertainment/319 Music Group and The Kickback was distributed by Sony/RED on July 12, 2011.

== Members' deaths ==
Montae Talbert, known in the group as "M-Bone", was shot on May 15, 2011. The 22-year-old rapper was the victim of a drive-by shooting in Inglewood. M-Bone was in his car after visiting a local liquor store when he was shot twice in the head. He was brought to a hospital where he was pronounced dead. Three days after M-Bone's death, Cali Swag District premiered the song, "How to Do That", in his honor. The song was included on their mixtape, Deeper Than the Dougie.

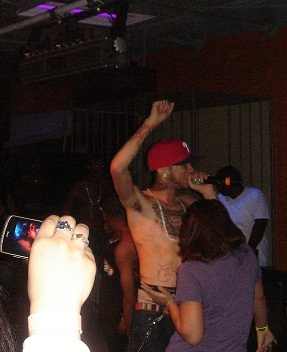
M-Bone dances with a fan during a concert at Club Millennium in Anchorage, Alaska, October 24, 2010

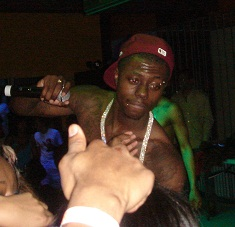
Yung during a concert at Club Millennium in Anchorage, Alaska, October 24, 2010

Cahron Childs, known in the group as "JayAre", died on June 6, 2014. According to a source, the rapper suffered from sickle cell anemia. He was admitted to the hospital after he had a seizure in his sleep. While in the hospital, JayAre fell into cardiac arrest and died at the age of 25.

== Discography ==
=== Studio albums ===
List of albums, with selected chart positions
Title	Album details	Peak chart positions	
Title	Album details	US R&B	US Rap
The Kickback	Released: July 12, 2011; Label: Sphinx Music Entertainment, 319 Music Group; Format: CD, digital download	35	21

=== Mixtapes ===
- Deeper Than the Dougie (2011)
- Rns: D&G Lyfestyle Mixtape (2012)
- Fast Lyfe in Slow Motion (2012)
- The District (2014)

=== Singles ===
Single	Year	Peak chart positions			Certifications	Album
Single	Year	US	US R&B /HH	US Rap	Certifications	Album
"Teach Me How to Dougie"	2010	28	9	6	RIAA: 2× Platinum	The Kickback
"Where You Are"	2010	—	45	22		Non-album single
"Kickback"	2011	—	91	—		The Kickback
"Burn Out (Drive Fast)"	2011	—	97	—		The Kickback
"She Gettin It" (featuring E-40)	2011	—	—	—		Non-album single
"Shake Somethin" (featuring Tiffany Foxx and Problem)	2013	—	—	—		We All We Got (shelved)
"Twerk It" (featuring TeeFlii)	2013	—	—	—		We All We Got (shelved)
"The Way I Lean"	2013	—	—	—		We All We Got (shelved)
