= SwinDoe =

American rapper

- Origin: Tucson, Arizona, U.S.
- Genres: Hip hop
- Occupations: Rapper, entrepreneur
- Years active: 2009–present
- Label: Blk Boyz Music Group

SwinDoe is an American rapper and entrepreneur originally from Tucson, Arizona. He is best known for his 2010 self-titled debut album, Swindoe, which peaked at number 123 on the Billboard 200.

== Career ==
Bradford garnered music industry attention for the unconventional marketing strategy used for his debut project. He conducted a global promotional campaign for Swindoe primarily through his BlackBerry smartphone, utilizing a viral jingle that publicized his BlackBerry PIN (3079E65E) to engage directly with listeners. Through this method, he established a distribution network across various BlackBerry-themed websites internationally.

The album was released on February 8, 2010, via Blk Boyz Music Group—an acronym for "Black Latino Konnected," a label he co-founded to bridge African-American and Latino musical influences. In addition to its placement on the Billboard 200, the record reached number 2 on the Heatseekers Albums chart and number 10 on the Top Rap Albums chart.

== Discography ==
Studio albums

- Swindoe (2010)
