= The Kickback (album) =

Studio album by Cali Swag District
- Released: July 12, 2011
- Genre: Hip-hop
- Length: 61:02
- Labels: Sphinx; 319; Sony; RED
- Producer: RunWay Star

Singles from The Kickback
- 1. "Teach Me How to Dougie" Released: April 13, 2010; 2. "Kickback" Released: January 18, 2011; 3. "Burn Out (Drive Fast)" Released: August 23, 2011

The Kickback is the only studio album by American hip hop group Cali Swag District.

Originally to be released under Capitol Records, the album experienced numerous delays. With Capitol Records' parent company, EMI, facing an uncertain future, CSD requested to be released from the Capitol contract. The group eventually signed with Sphinx Music Entertainment/319 Music Group and The Kickback was distributed by Sony/RED on July 12, 2011.

== Reception ==
Professional ratings
Aggregate scores
Source	Rating
Metacritic	67/100
Review scores
Source	Rating
AllMusic	3.5/5 stars
Entertainment Weekly	B+
HipHopDX	2/5
Los Angeles Times	2.5/4 stars

The Kickback received positive reviews from critics. On Metacritic, the album holds a score of 67/100 based on 5 reviews, indicating "generally favorable reviews".

== Track listing ==
Track listing revealed by iTunes Store.

- All tracks are produced by RunWay Star.

No.	Title	Sample(s)	Length
1.	"Roof Back"		3:49
2.	"Disgusting"		3:44
3.	"Kickback"		4:14
4.	"Burn Out (Drive Fast)"		5:11
5.	"Me & U" (featuring Recognition)		4:32
6.	"I'm Freaking You" (featuring YP Da'Writa)	*Contains samples of "Freek'n You" by Jodeci	5:00
7.	"Hip Hop Fiend"		3:56
8.	"Rock N Republic"		3:59
9.	"9th Inning"		4:16
10.	"I Don't Need Your Money"		3:40
11.	"Back It Up and Dump It"	*Contains samples of "Teach Me How to Dougie"	4:00
12.	"Run That"		3:32
13.	"Can't Live Without My Music" (featuring Ashley A.)		3:39
14.	"Teach Me How to Dougie"		3:57
15.	"Go"		3:13
