= The Lost Songs Vol. 1 =

Studio album by Outlawz
- Released: March 23, 2010
- Recorded: 1999–2009
- Genre: Gangsta rap; hardcore hip hop
- Length: 48:16
- Label: 1Nation Entertainment; Outlaw Recordz
- Producer: Outlawz (exec.)

Outlawz chronology
We Want In: The Street LP (2008)	The Lost Songs Vol. 1 (2010)	The Lost Songs Vol. 2 (2010)

The Lost Songs Vol. 1 is a digital album by Outlawz, released March 23, 2010 on Outlaw Recordz and 1Nation Entertainment.

== Track listing ==
No.	Title	Length
1.	"Big Body Truck" (EDIDON, Young Noble, Trae Tha Truth)	4:02
2.	"Cold" (EDIDON, Young Noble)	4:28
3.	"Comeback" (K. Kastro, EDIDON, Young Noble)	3:55
4.	"I Ain't Channgin'" (EDIDON, Stormey Coleman, Young Noble)	3:32
5.	"Let It" (EDIDON, Napoleon, Young Noble)	4:13
6.	"Make It Right" (K. Kastro, Young Noble, EDIDON)	4:31
7.	"Make Moves" (EDIDON, Stormey Coleman, K. Kastro, Young Noble)	4:08
8.	"My Lullaby" (K. Kastro, EDIDON, Young Noble)	3:53
9.	"Outlaw" (Napoleon, Young Noble)	4:09
10.	"People Say" (Young Noble, Napoleon)	2:56
11.	"Take Away" (EDIDON, Young Noble, K. Kastro)	4:40
12.	"U & Me" (Young Noble, Napoleon, EDIDON, K. Kastro)	3:49
