= Masta Killa Live =

Masta Killa "Live"

Live album by Masta Killa
- Released: March 30, 2010
- Genre: Hip hop
- Length: 35:28
- Label: Gold Dust Media

Masta Killa chronology
Made in Brooklyn (2006)	Masta Killa "Live" (2010)	Selling My Soul (2012)

Professional ratings
Review scores
Source	Rating
AllMusic	3.5/5 stars
laut.de	1/5 stars
PopMatters	6/10
RapReviews	5/10

Masta Killa "Live" is a live album by American rapper Masta Killa. It was released on March 30, 2010, through Gold Dust Media. It features live performances with his fellow Wu-Tang Clan groupmates GZA and Inspectah Deck, as well as Wu-Tang affiliates Streetlife, Prodigal Sunn and Startel.

== Track listing ==
No.	Title	Length
1.	"Mystery of Chessboxin (A Cappella)"	0:52
2.	"Armored Truck"	0:49
3.	"Silverbacks" (featuring Inspectah Deck and GZA)	3:14
4.	"Duel of the Iron Mic" (featuring GZA)	2:54
5.	"School"	2:24
6.	"Grab the Mic"	2:26
7.	"No Said Date"	1:35
8.	"In the Hood"	1:17
9.	"Love Spell" (featuring Startel)	5:10
10.	"D.T.D."	1:47
11.	"Street Education" (featuring Streetlife)	1:23
12.	"Whatever" (featuring Streetlife and Prodigal Sunn)	2:10
13.	"Fam Members Only" (featuring GZA)	2:28
14.	"Digiwarfare"	2:54
15.	"Guillotine (Swordz)" (featuring GZA)	1:50
16.	"Triumph" (featuring Inspectah Deck and GZA)	2:15
Total length:		35:28
