= Swindoe (album) =

Studio album by SwinDoe
- Released: February 8, 2010
- Genre: Hip hop
- Producer: SwinDoe (exec.)

Singles from Swindoe

Swindoe is the self-titled album by American rapper SwinDoe. It is also his first studio album. It was released independently on February 8, 2010.

== Reception ==
=== Critical reception ===
iTunes album review stated Arizona rapper SwinDoe's self-titled effort is a sure and exciting debut suggesting that hip-hop's seldom heard cactus league deserves more time in the spotlight. Opening with a Game-like story of struggle ("God is a blacksmith/Look how he pounded me”) called "I Knew It," the album struts like a major-label release right from the start, gaining momentum with club tracks like the party-time "Blkberry 2.0" and tempering all the street fury with well-placed bedroom numbers such as the second-half highlight "Victim of Desire." The guest list might be unknown but it is talented, and the man at the center of it all is a versatile mix of Plies and Jay-Z with a unique Arizona twist. Check the moving closer "That's Why" for the best example of his insightful writing style.

=== Commercial reception ===
It debuted on the Billboard Hot 100 at the number 123 position. It also debuted on the R&B/Hip-Hop Albums at #28, #2 on the Heatseekers Albums chart, Top Rap Albums at #10 and debuted at #14 on the Independent Albums chart.

== Track listing ==
1. I Knew It Ft Laren 4:36
2. Blkberry 2.0 4:35
3. Candies 3:27
4. Up Ft Cameron 4:01
5. Body Talk Ft Andre McCray 4:47
6. La Verdad Ft Ricky Paz 3:41
7. Relapse Ft Ricky Paz 3:18
8. Shoes On Ft the Tu 4:10
9. Victim of Desire Ft Robard Johnson 4:27
10. Price Tag Ft Soul Fruit 3:53
11. Lattay Dattay 3:40
12. My World Ft the Tu 4:10
13. We Hustle Ft Baba O 3:42
14. It Wont Be Long Ft Awelle 3:49
15. Phony People Ft Ricky Paz Swindoe 4:15
16. That's Why 5:09

== Chart positions ==
Chart (2010)	Peak position
U.S. Billboard 200	123
U.S. Billboard Top Independent Albums	14
U.S. Billboard Top R&B/Hip-Hop Albums	28
U.S. Billboard Top Rap Albums	10
U.S. Billboard Heatseakers Albums	2
