= The Lost Songs Vol. 2 =

Studio album by Outlawz
- Released: March 23, 2010
- Recorded: 1999–2009
- Genre: Gangsta rap; hardcore hip hop
- Length: 49:49
- Label: 1Nation Entertainment; Outlaw Recordz
- Producer: Outlawz (exec.)

Outlawz chronology
The Lost Songs Vol. 1 (2010)	The Lost Songs Vol. 2 (2010)	The Lost Songs Vol. 3 (2010)

The Lost Songs Vol. 2 is a digital album by Outlawz, released March 23, 2010 on Outlaw Recordz and 1Nation Entertainment.

== Track listing ==
No.	Title	Length
1.	"Ghetto Near U" (EDIDON, K. Kastro & Big Ghee)	3:17
2.	"Feelin' This" (EDIDON, Young Noble, K. Kastro)	3:40
3.	"Young Man" (K. Kastro, Young Noble, Stormey Coleman, EDIDON)	4:08
4.	"Just a Lie" (K. Kastro, Young Noble, Stormey Coleman & King Malachi)	5:05
5.	"Make U Hate Me" (EDIDON, K. Kastro, Young Noble, Stormey Coleman)	5:05
6.	"She Said" (K. Kastro, Young Noble, EDIDON & Flame)	3:45
7.	"Just a Fool" (EDIDON, Young Noble, K. Kastro)	4:10
8.	"In Ya Life" (EDIDON, Young Noble & Lloyd)	4:01
9.	"Heaven's Sake" (EDIDON, Young Noble, K. Kastro)	3:45
10.	"Goin' Home" (K. Kastro, Young Noble, EDIDON & J. Holiday)	3:48
11.	"Thug Music" (Young Noble, Napoleon)	2:56
12.	"Came a Long Way" (Young Noble, K. Kastro, EDIDON)	4:13
