= Violent by Design =

Studio album by Jedi Mind Tricks
- Released: October 3, 2000
- Recorded: 1998–2000
- Genres: East Coast hip-hop; hardcore hip-hop
- Length: 76:08
- Label: Superegular Records
- Producers: Stoupe the Enemy of Mankind; Mr. Len

Jedi Mind Tricks chronology
The Psycho-Social CD (1997)	Violent by Design (2000)	Visions of Gandhi (2003)

Singles from Violent by Design
- 1. "Heavenly Divine" Released: 1999; 2. "Genghis Khan" Released: 2000; 3. "Retaliation" Released: 2001

Professional ratings
Review scores
Source	Rating
AllHipHop.com	4/5 stars
AllMusic	3/5 stars
cosmik	C+
RapReviews.com	8.5/10 stars
Salacious Sound	(favorable)

Violent by Design is the second album by underground hip-hop group Jedi Mind Tricks. Despite never reaching any Billboard album chart, the album sold 50,000 copies in its first week on shelves. The album was originally released on JMT's self-run Superegular Records on October 3, 2000. JMT's previous label, Babygrande Records, re-released the album on May 25, 2004. The original vinyl release featured twenty tracks, while the original CD release featured two extra tracks: the "Heavenly Divine Remix", originally released on the B-Side to JMT's "Heavenly Divine" single, and "War Ensemble", originally released as the B-Side of the Army of the Pharaohs Five Perfect Exertions EP. Babygrande's Deluxe Edition featured three more bonus tracks: "Untitled", "Retaliation Remix" and "Blood Runs Cold", the latter two originally featured on the "Retaliation" single. The Deluxe Edition also included a bonus DVD, featuring a video scrapbook from their Visions of Gandhi tour, and the music video for the group's 1997 track "I Who Have Nothing".

Vinnie Paz and Stoupe the Enemy of Mankind recruited Camden, New Jersey rapper Jus Allah to join them on the album, and while he was never officially inducted into the group, it can be assumed he became JMT's third member on the release, as his contributions were not marked as "featuring Jus Allah", while other close group affiliates such as Army of the Pharaohs members Chief Kamachi, Esoteric and Virtuoso were marked as featured guests. He was also featured in the album's photography.

The album was recorded and mixed in Stoupe's bedroom for nine months, and because Stoupe was still living at his parents' house, they recorded every Friday for three hours.

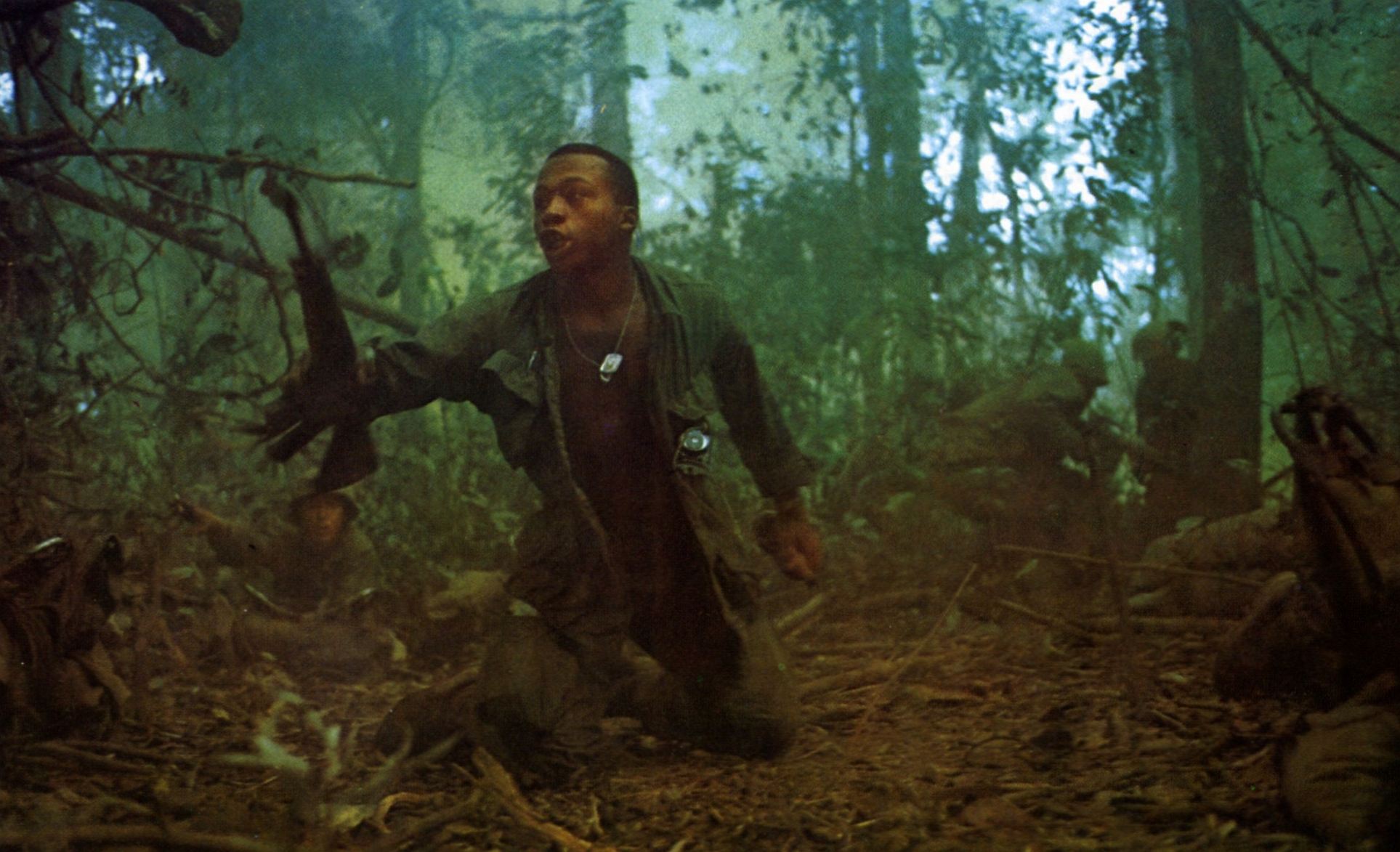
Photograph of a U.S. soldier calling for a medic during the Battle of Dak To (1967)

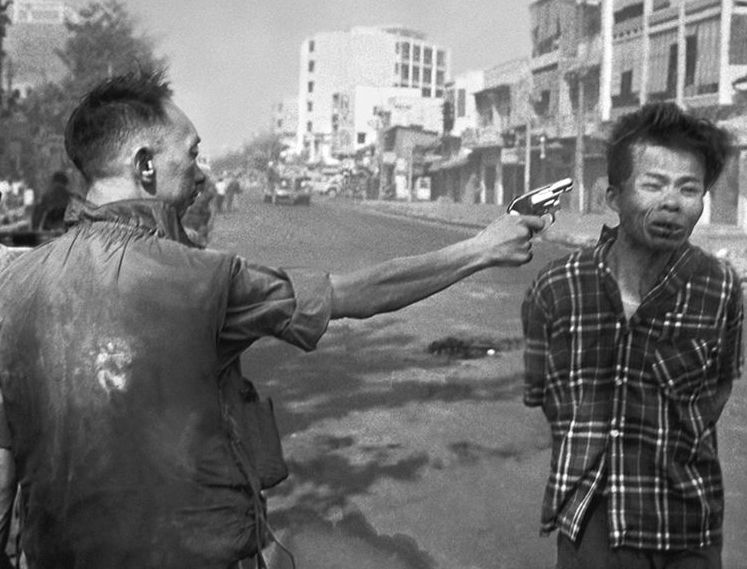
Execution of Nguyễn Văn Lém (1968)

The cover art is from a photograph by Joel D. Meyerson, taken during the Battle of Dak To. The execution of Nguyễn Văn Lém is printed on the inside of the digipak.

== History ==
The group began recording their second album, originally titled Polymatrix: Reincarnation of the Hologramic Christ, after the release of their 1997 debut, The Psycho-Social, Chemical, Biological & Electro-Magnetic Manipulation of Human Consciousness, and the group's side project with the Army of the Pharaohs, 1998's Five Perfect Exertions EP. In the summer of 1999, the group released the "Heavenly Divine" single to hype their second album. The single has been recognized as the group's trademark song, and was described as "a perfect blend of Jedi Mind's metaphysical, spiritual and street influences". The following year, JMT released the single "Genghis Khan", featuring underground veteran Tragedy Khadafi, to further hype their upcoming album. After two years of recording, Violent by Design was released, featuring guest verses from AOTP members Esoteric, Virtuoso, Chief Kamachi and Bahamadia, OuterSpace member Planetary, Killa Sha, Mr. Lif, DiamondBack, Louis Logic, B.A. Barakus, L-Fudge, and J-Treds, as well as two interludes performed by Company Flow member Mr. Len.

Straying from the science fiction and conspiracy theory topics that dominated their debut, JMT adopted a more rugged, hardcore style with Violent by Design, mixing their past metaphysical content with violent lyrics. Their new unrelenting style gained them a large new underground following, but at the same time drew significant criticism, largely due to the album's intense violence, and controversial anti-Christian and homophobic lyrical content. Due to this, AllMusic writer Dean Carlson stated that the group was "well-versed in contradictions", but also praised the group's unique style, stating, "They know how to intimidate without gangsta pretensions and they know how to create menace without losing sight of humor or clarity." While Carlson had mixed feelings on the album, AMG writer Joshua Glazer referred to it as a classic. RapReviews.com writer Steve 'Flash' Juon said that the album's graphic lyrics would "turn some people off", and like Carlson, went on to compliment the rapper's style, stating, "Paz and Jus can definitely flow, and they have essentially invented a new rapping style." Juon ultimately praised the album, saying:

"By adding another emcee and evolving their sound, JMT created a completely unique work with their sophomore epic... Courtesy of Stoupe, each song is brimming with random vocal snippets and string-laden, moody samples. The two emcees rap with unfettered fire, attacking everything from Catholicism to the American Government. This LP is a trip, in every sense of the word. Without a doubt, JMT's work is something to explore deeply, especially for the wonderful harmonies that Stoupe manifests. For those with patience and a sense of superior hip-hop, "Violent By Design" cannot be ignored. It is simply too remarkable."

To date, the most acclaimed aspect of the album has been the dark, atmospheric production work by Stoupe the Enemy of Mankind. Featuring a variety of vague samples, largely taken from movie scores and various tracks from Latin artists, matched with random vocals taken from numerous films and selections of poems by British poet Wilfred Owen, Stoupe's work on Violent by Design helped to establish him as one of underground hip-hop's preeminent producers. In his album review, Steve Juon praises Stoupe's work on the album, calling it "absolutely riveting", and even going so far as to say that his production on "Sacrifice" was "one of the greatest single-song productions I have ever heard in hip-hop." He goes on to state:

"The glue that holds "Violent By Design" together is clearly Stoupe the Enemy of Mankind. The soundscapes he crafts on this album are complex, moody, and quite exceptional... All of these works, despite being completely distinctive, fall well within the range of the musical themes that Stoupe brings to the record... He practically invents a new method of hip-hop artistry."

== Track listing ==
No.	Title	Producer	Length
1.	"Intro"	Stoupe the Enemy of Mankind	0:43
2.	"Retaliation"	Stoupe the Enemy of Mankind	3:44
3.	"Contra" (featuring Killasha)	Stoupe the Enemy of Mankind, DJ Kwestion (scratches)	3:18
4.	"Speech Cobras" (featuring Mr. Lif)	Stoupe the Enemy of Mankind, Drew Dollars (scratches)	4:22
5.	"Breath of God Interlude"	Stoupe the Enemy of Mankind	0:37
6.	"Death March" (featuring Esoteric and Virtuoso)	Stoupe the Enemy of Mankind	3:34
7.	"Words from Mr. Len Part One"	Mr. Len	0:58
8.	"I Against I" (featuring Planetary)	Stoupe the Enemy of Mankind	3:49
9.	"Exertions (Remix)" (featuring Bahamadia, Esoteric and Virtuoso)	Stoupe the Enemy of Mankind	3:14
10.	"The Prophecy Interlude"	Stoupe the Enemy of Mankind	0:36
11.	"Heavenly Divine"	Stoupe the Enemy of Mankind	4:34
12.	"Sacrifice"	Stoupe the Enemy of Mankind	3:20
13.	"Permanent Night Interlude"	Stoupe the Enemy of Mankind	0:39
14.	"The Deer Hunter" (featuring Chief Kamachi)	Stoupe the Enemy of Mankind	3:41
15.	"Blood Reign" (featuring B.A. Barakus, Diamondback and Louis Logic)	Stoupe the Enemy of Mankind	3:37
16.	"Words from Mr. Len Part Two"	Mr. Len	0:29
17.	"Genghis Khan" (featuring Tragedy Khadafi)	Stoupe the Enemy of Mankind	3:50
18.	"Trinity" (featuring L-Fudge, Louis Logic)	Stoupe the Enemy of Mankind	3:36
19.	"The Executioner’s Dream" (featuring J-Treds)	Stoupe the Enemy of Mankind	3:52
20.	"Muerte"	Stoupe the Enemy of Mankind	3:57
21.	"Heavenly Divine (Remix) (hidden track)"	Stoupe the Enemy of Mankind	3:21
22.	"War Ensemble (hidden track)" (performed by Army of the Pharaohs featuring Esoteric and Virtuoso)	Stoupe the Enemy of Mankind	4:07
Total length:			64:12

2004 Deluxe Edition
No.	Title	Producer	Length
23.	"Untitled"	Stoupe the Enemy of Mankind	3:38
24.	"Retaliation (Remix)"	Stoupe the Enemy of Mankind	4:23
25.	"Blood Runs Cold" (featuring Sean Price)	Stoupe the Enemy of Mankind	3:55
Total length:			76:08

=== Sample credits ===
Intro

- "Elegia al Che Guevara" by Quilapayún
- Excerpt from Roddy McDowall’s dialogue from the film Planet of the Apes

Retaliation

- "El Rio y las Rosas" by Rosita Perú
- "Get Out of My Life, Woman" by Lee Dorsey
- "Cross My Heart" by Killah Priest featuring GZA and Inspectah Deck
- "Money in the Bank" by Kool G Rap & DJ Polo

Contra

- "Port Authority Terminal" and "A Song That Never Comes" by Cashman, Pistilli & West
- "Gotta Get Over (Taking Loot)" by Gang Starr
- "Def Rhymes" by 7L & Esoteric
- "Up Against the Wall (Low Budget Mix)" by Group Home

Speech Cobras

- Excerpt from Sean Gullette’s monologue from the film Pi
- "Ginseng Woman” by Eric Gale
- "Hom Many MC’s…” by Black Moon
- "Di Goldene Pave" by The Klezmatics and Chava Alberstein

Breath of God Interlude

- Stephen Hawking's lecture "Sciente in the Next Millenium" at The Second Millennium Evening at the White House

Death March

- Excerpt from the speech by The Undertaker from the episode of WWE Raw aired on January 18, 1999
- "The Monster Materializes" by Richard Band

Words from Mr. Len Part One

- "Friday’s Child" by Nancy Sinatra

I Against I

- "What Are You Doing for the Rest of Your Life?" by Cal Tjader
- "Jazz (We've Got) (Re-Recording)" by A Tribe Called Quest

Exertions (Remix)

- "Estabamos Juntos" by Sonia Silvestre
- Excerpt from the CBS radio broadcast of Adolf Hitler’s 1 September 1939 Reichstag speech
- Excerpt from Ralph Bunche’s Nobel Peace Prize acceptance speech

The Prophecy Interlude

- "Your Love Is Mine" by Holly Golightly
- Excerpt from Eric Stoltz’s monologue from the film The Prophecy

Heavenly Divine

- Yo-Yo Ma and Bobby McFerrin’s rendition of Antonio Vivaldi’s Andante from Concerto in D Minor for 2 Mandolins
- Excerpts from the English translated broadcast of Pope John Paul II’s Pontificate inauguration Mass

Sacrifice

- "Apathy" by Gene Cotton
- Excerpts from Gene Hackman’s dialogue from the film Antz
- "9th Wonder (Blackitolism)" by Digable Planets
- "You Ain’t a Killer" by Big Pun

Permanent Midnight Interlude

- "Lotus" by The Rainbow Band
- "The Pope of Fools" by Alec R. Costandinos and The Syncophonic Orchestra

The Deer Hunter

- "Too Much" by Mathilde Santing
- "Il dolore sulla Casbah" by Ennio Morricone and Gillo Pontecorvo
- Excerpt from Burt Lancaster’s dialogue from the film Judgment at Nuremberg
- Excerpt from Marshall Applewhite’s tape Do’s Final Exit

Blood Reign

- "Section" by The Roots
- "Bloodshed and War" by Da Youngsta's featuring Mobb Deep
- "Your Cranium’s Cracked" by The Singing MC Breeze

Genghis Khan

- "Downloading" by Harald Kloser

Trinity

- Pierre Pierlot, I Solisti Veneti and Claudio Scimone’s rendition of Tomaso Albinoni’s Concerto in D Minor for Oboe, Strings and Continuo, Op. 9, No. 2 – Allegro

The Executioner’s Dream

- Excerpt from Harvey Keitel’s monologue from the film Mean Streets
- "Lullaby, Part 1" by Krzysztof Komeda
- "Triangular Warfare" by Mr. Lif
- "Worst Enemy" by Buc Fifty

Muerte

- "De Que Te Quiero… Te Quiero" by Gilberto Valenzuela
- "Adieu à la Nuit (Adieu to the Night)" by Paul Mauriat and His Orchestra
- "Doggone" by Love
- Richard Burton reading of Wilfred Owen’s poem "Greater Love"

Heavenly Divine (Remix)

- "Uninvited" by Alanis Morissette
- Richard Burton reading of Wilfred Owen's poems "Apologia Pro Poemate Meo", "The Show" and "Arms and the Boy"

War Ensemble

- Excerpts from Martin Sheen and Marlon Brando’s dialogues from the film Apocalypse Now
- "All in Love Is Fair" by Stevie Wonder
- "Chinese Water Torture" by Jedi Mind Tricks

Untitled

- "Palomino" by Jon Boyes
- Richard Burton reading of Wilfred Owen's poem "Sonnet On Seeing a Piece of our Heavy Artillery Brought into Action"

Retaliation (Remix)

- "De Los Amores" by Susana Baca

Blood Runs Cold

- "Septiembre y Usted" by Wilkins
- "Keep It Thoro" by Prodigy

== Album singles ==
Single information
"Heavenly Divine"
- Released: 1999
- Label: Superegular Records
- B-Side: "Trinity", "Heavenly Divine (Remix)"
"Genghis Khan"
- Released: 2000
- Label: Superegular Records
- B-Side:
"Retaliation"/"Retaliation Remix"
- Released: 2001
- Label: Superegular Records
- B-Side: "Blood Runs Cold"
