= C of Tranquility =

Studio album by Canibus
- Released: October 5, 2010
- Recorded: 2010
- Genre: Hip-hop
- Length: 44:40
- Label: Interdependent Media
- Producers: Scram Jones, D.R. Period, Jake One, The ARE, Tha Bizness, DJ Premier, Martin, J-Zone, Slopfunkdust, J. Bizness, HG, Domingo

Canibus chronology
Melatonin Magik (2010)	C of Tranquility (2010)	Lyrical Law (2011)

Professional ratings
Review scores
Source	Rating
Robert Christgau	(3-star Honorable Mention)
Exclaim!	mixed
HipHopDX	3.5/5
RapReviews.com	7.5/10

C of Tranquility is the tenth studio album by American rapper Canibus. It was released on October 5, 2010 on Interdependent Media.

== Track listing ==
No.	Title	Producer(s)	Length
1.	"CPTN Cold Crush"	Scram Jones	3:43
2.	"Salute"	D.R. Period	4:00
3.	"C Scrolls"	Jake One	2:00
4.	"Merchant of Metaphors"	The ARE	3:23
5.	"Lunar Deluge"	Tha Bizness	2:56
6.	"Golden Terra of Rap"	DJ Premier	3:27
7.	"Title 17 USMC"	Martin	2:28
8.	"Free Words"	J-Zone	1:10
9.	"The Messenger's Message"	Slopfunkdust, J. Bizness	2:30
10.	"Cingularity Point"	HG	4:25
11.	"Pine Comb Poem"	Domingo	3:14
12.	"Good Equals Evil"	Martin	4:17
13.	"Worthlessness Purpose"	The ARE	2:03
14.	"Right Now"	HG	1:55
15.	"Golden Terra of Rap (IM Remix)" (featuring Von Pea & Donwill of Tanya Morgan, TRUTHLiVE, and Moe Green)	DJ Premier	3:09
16.	"Jack Move" (iTunes bonus track; featuring Ammbush)		2:18

== Charts ==
Chart	Peak position
US Top R&B/Hip-Hop Albums (Billboard)	77
