= Melatonin Magik =

Studio album by Canibus
- Released: February 9, 2010
- Recorded: 2008–10
- Genre: Hip-hop
- Label: War Lab
- Producers: ENG, Rob Fatal, The Architect, Blastah Beatz, X, Sicknature, The Legendary Charlie G, Beat Butcha, Krohme, Nickel Plated

Canibus chronology
For Whom the Beat Tolls (2007)	Melatonin Magik (2010)	C of Tranquility (2010)

Professional ratings
Review scores
Source	Rating
aboveGround Magazine	4.5/5 stars
Beat-Town	3.5/5 stars
HipHopDX	3/5 stars
Muddled Medley	3/5 stars
Parlé Magazine	4/5 stars
RapReviews	9/10

Melatonin Magik (stylized in all caps) is the ninth studio album by American rapper Canibus. The album contains guest appearances by Professor Griff of Public Enemy who provides introductory or hype vocals on numerous songs. The album also features production from a collective of producers such as Sicknature and ENG, as well as performance appearances by fellow rap artists such as DZK and Warbux of Warlab Records, Blaq Poet, K-Solo, and D12, among others.

== Artwork ==
The conceptual artwork for Melatonin Magik is partly inspired by the feature film The Matrix, depicting Canibus in a meditative posture surrounded by chains and broken glass. The red pill and blue pills that levitate from his hands allude to the central protagonist's choice between the two. The graphic design artist credited with its illustration was commissioned by Canibus himself through Spitboss.

== Track list ==
No.	Title	Producer(s)	Length
1.	"Melatonin Magik Intro"	Rob Fatal & The Architect	2:13
2.	"Melatonin Magik" (featuring Professor Griff)	Blastah Beatz	4:59
3.	"Kriminal Kindness" (featuring Professor Griff)	Blastah Beatz	3:04
4.	"Hip-Hop Black Ops" (featuring Professor Griff)	Flip Da SoulFisher	3:35
5.	"The Dragon of Judah" (featuring Professor Griff)	Sicknature	3:18
6.	"Post Traumatic Warlab Stress" (with DZK & Warbux)	Sicknature	5:53
7.	"Air Strike (Pop Killer)" (featuring D12 & DZK)	ENG	5:28
8.	"Fraternity of the Impoverished" (featuring Professor Griff)	Sicknature	4:28
9.	"Dead by Design" (featuring Professor Griff)	ENG	4:54
10.	"Only Slaves D.R.E.A.M."	ENG	4:18
11.	"Ripperland" (featuring The Goddess Psalm One)	The Legendary Charlie G	3:50
12.	"Stomp On Ya Brain" (featuring Journalist)	X	3:35
13.	"Beat Butcher Get Em'" (featuring Jaecyn Bayne, Son One & Chopp Devize)	Beat Butcha	4:43
14.	"Do It Live!" (featuring Blaq Poet, Skarlet Rose & Presto)	Nickel Plated	4:30
15.	"Sharpshootaz Blazin' Caps" (featuring K-Solo, Born Sun, Willie Dynamite & Maintain)	X	5:34
16.	"Gold & Bronze Magik" (featuring Bronze Nazareth & Copywrite)	Krohme	5:33

== Deluxe Edition ==
A deluxe edition of Melatonin Magik featuring two bonus tracks, "Wu-Flix" and "Fraternity of the Impoverished (Extended Mix)", the album was released digitally on February 9, 2010.

== Controversy ==
The song "Air Strike (Pop Killer)" generated controversy as Canibus reignited a feud with longtime rival Eminem and used D12 verses secured by DZK to create the illusion that they had sided with him.

Professor Griff appears on several songs, which was also controversial given his past public statements that led to him being frozen out of the mainstream hip-hop scene.

== Reception ==
The album received mixed to positive reviews, with RapReviews awarding it a 9 out of 10.

== Charts ==
Chart (2010)	Peak position
U.S. Billboard Top R&B/Hip-Hop Albums	91
