= Meta-Historical =

Studio album by KRS-One and True Master
- Released: August 31, 2010
- Recorded: January–May 2010
- Genre: Hip-hop
- Label: Fat Beats
- Producer: True Master (also exec.)

KRS-One chronology
Survival Skills (2009)	Meta-Historical (2010)	Godsville (2011)

True Master chronology
Meta-Historical (2010)	Divine Intervention (2021)

Professional ratings
Review scores
Source	Rating
Beats Per Minute	72%
HipHopDX	3/5
Juice	2.5/6
RapReviews	4/10

Meta-Historical is a collaborative studio album by American rapper KRS-One and fellow record producer True Master. It was released on August 31, 2010, through Fat Beats Records. The album was produced by True Master. It features guest appearances from Cappadonna, Dr. Oyibo, and RZA. The album peaked at number 57 on the Billboard Top R&B/Hip-Hop Albums chart and number 24 on the Top Rap Albums chart in the United States.

== Track listing ==
All music is composed by Derek "True Master" Harris.

No.	Title	Length
1.	"Intro"	0:53
2.	"Murda Ya"	3:59
3.	"Madonna & Child" (skit)	0:36
4.	"Unified Field" (featuring Dr. Oyibo)	3:25
5.	"Gimme Da '90s"	2:26
6.	"Revelation" (skit)	1:04
7.	"Knowledge Reigns Supreme" (featuring True Master)	2:29
8.	"My Mind" (skit)	0:33
9.	"Palm & Fist"	2:40
10.	"One of Them Days"	3:28
11.	"Ancient Hip Hop" (skit)	0:56
12.	"Old School Hip Hop" (featuring Jersey)	3:42
13.	"Naga" (skit)	1:11
14.	"One Two, Here's What We Gon' Do" (featuring RZA)	2:47
15.	"Freeman" (skit)	0:50
16.	"Meta-Historical"	3:50
17.	"The Struggle" (skit)	0:59
18.	"Street Rhymer" (featuring Cappadonna)	2:48
19.	"He's Us" (featuring True Master)	3:03
20.	"Outro"	1:13

== Personnel ==
- Lawrence "KRS-One" Parker – rap vocals
- Derek "True Master" Harris – rap vocals (tracks: 7, 19), producer, mixing, executive producer
- Dr. Oyibo – featured artist (track 4)
- Robert "RZA" Diggs – featured artist (track 14)
- Darryl "Cappadonna" Hill – featured artist (track 18)
- Jose "Choco" Reynoso – engineering
- Eric "E-Bass" Johnson – engineering
- Hokiem Green – executive producer
- Joe LaPorta – mastering

== Charts ==
Chart (2010)	Peak position
US Top R&B/Hip-Hop Albums (Billboard)	57
US Top Rap Albums (Billboard)	24
