= The Psycho-Social, Chemical, Biological & Electro-Magnetic Manipulation of Human Consciousness =

Studio album by Jedi Mind Tricks
- Released: November 4, 1997
- Recorded: 1996–1997; 1993–1995
- Genres: East Coast hip-hop; hardcore hip-hop; horrorcore
- Length: 66:42
- Labels: Superegular; Babygrande
- Producer: Stoupe the Enemy of Mankind

Jedi Mind Tricks chronology
Amber Probe (1996)	The Psycho-Social, Chemical, Biological & Electro-Magnetic Manipulation of Human Consciousness (1997)	Violent by Design (2000)

The Psycho-Social, Chemical, Biological & Electro-Magnetic Manipulation of Human Consciousness (often abbreviated as The Psycho-Social CD) is the debut album of underground hip-hop group Jedi Mind Tricks, consisting of rapper Vinnie Paz (then known as Ikon the Verbal Hologram) and producer Stoupe the Enemy of Mankind. The original version of the album was released in 1997, limited to 1,000 copies on vinyl by Superegular Records, and was re-released on CD in 2003 on Babygrande Records with six bonus tracks, featuring songs recorded by the group before their debut release. It has been a common misconception that the vinyl version was re-issued in 2001, possibly because the back of the vinyl release says "2001 Superegular." The album’s often esoteric lyrics focus on conspiracy theories, astronomy, religion, and violence, themes that JMT would expand on in later albums. The album was inspired by a lot of "crazy books" mentioned by Vinnie Paz in an interview, and is named after one of those books, a 1,900-page tome entitled "Matrix III - The Psycho-Social, Chemical, Biological & Electromagnetic Manipulation of Human Consciousness,” by Valdamar Valerian.

== Critical reception ==
Professional ratings
Review scores
Source	Rating
AllMusic	4/5 stars
RapReviews	7.5/10 stars

Dean Carlson of AllMusic described the album as consisting of "an angular, symphonic sweatshop of mid-tempo beats" that acted as a palette for the group's “scatter-shot rhymes and paranoid rhythms,” concluding that, "[I]t might take some time for Jedi Mind Tricks' sound to fully mature, but their metaphysical peculiarity is a promising new glow in the dark hip-hop underground." B. Ridge from RapReviews praised the idiosyncratic "sci-fi lyrics dealing with spaceships, Atlantis, and ancient prophecies", "heavy use of religious references and imagery", and Stoupe's production, which created a suitable soundscape to complement the lyrics. However, he criticized what he described as the occasional flatness of the beats, odd use of pop culture references, and cornball tendencies in the lyrics that may turn people away from listening to the album.

== Track listing ==
- All songs produced by Stoupe the Enemy of Mankind
- Track(s) 14-18 recorded between 1993-1995

No.	Title	Length
1.	"Intro"	0:37
2.	"The Winds of War"	3:18
3.	"Chinese Water Torture" (featuring Breath of Judah)	4:07
4.	"The Three Immortals" (featuring Apathy and Breath of Judah)	4:06
5.	"Neva Antiquated" (Dark Jedi Remix) (featuring Sun Pharaoh)	3:44
6.	"Omnicron" (featuring Apathy and Sun Pharaoh)	4:47
7.	"As It Was In the Beginning..." (featuring the Lost Children of Babylon)	3:43
8.	"Books of Blood: The Coming of Tan" (featuring El Eloh)	3:57
9.	"Incanatrix" (Interlude)	0:25
10.	"The Immaculate Conception"	3:48
11.	"The Apostles' Creed" (featuring Apathy and Yan the Phenomenon)	4:34
12.	"I Who Have Nothing"	4:44
13.	"Communion: The Crop Circle Thesis" (featuring the Lost Children of Babylon)	5:16
14.	"Onetwothree"	3:30
15.	"Souls from the Streets"	5:30
16.	"Last Straw" (Onesoul Remix)	3:17
17.	"Tug of War"	3:02
18.	"Get This Low" (featuring Black Thought and Jus Allah)	4:16

== Samples ==
"Intro"

- "The Bible: In the Beginning"
- "No More Worries" by Del the Funky Homosapien featuring Hieroglyphics

"The Winds of War"

- "Se7en", a 1995 movie.
- "Triumph" by Wu-Tang Clan (Masta Killa verse)

"The Three Immortals"

- "Hellraiser"
- "Meiso" by DJ Krush featuring Black Thought and Malik B. of The Roots

"Omnicron"

- "On Production" by Dr. Octagon
- "Biology 101" by Dr. Octagon

"Books of Blood
The Coming of Tan"

- Speech sample of Riley Martin

"Incanatrix"

- Contains a sample of Dialogue from The X-Files originally read from the Book of Revelation.

"The Apostle's Creed"

- "Time's Up" by O.C.

"I Who Have Nothing"

- "I (Who Have Nothing)" by Ben E. King
- "Runnin'" by The Pharcyde
- sounds from the Fantastic Planet Soundtrack (that ricocheting synth note)

"Chinese Water Torture"

- "Chinese Water Torture" by Laura Olsher
- "Metal Thangz" by Street Smartz featuring O.C., Pharoahe Monch, and F.T.

"Get This Low"

- "I Wish" by Stevie Wonder
- "We Write the Songs" by Marley Marl (Biz Markie verse)
- "Da Mystery of Chessboxin'" by Wu-Tang Clan (Ol' Dirty Bastard verse)
- "Protect Ya Neck" by Wu-Tang Clan (Raekwon verse)

"Last Straw (Onesoul Remix)"

- "I Used to Love H.E.R." by Common

"The Immaculate conception"

- "Stress" by Organized Konfusion
- "Lord of Illusions"
