= Reef the Lost Cauze discography =

- Studio albums: 5
- EPs: 3
- Collaborative albums: 11
- Mixtapes: 5

This is the discography of Reef the Lost Cauze, an American rapper from Philadelphia, Pennsylvania, United States.

== Albums ==
=== Studio albums ===
- The High Life (2001)
- Invisible Empire (2003)
- Feast or Famine (2005)
- A Vicious Cycle (2008)
- High Life 2013 (2013)
- The Majestic (2018)
- The Triumphant (2024)

=== Collaborative albums ===
- Black Candles (with JuJu Mob) (2005)
- The Torture Papers (with Army of the Pharaohs) (2006)
- Ritual of Battle (with Army of the Pharaohs) (2007)
- The Stress Files (Produced by Stress The White Boy) (2008)
- The Unholy Terror (with Army of the Pharaohs) (2010)
- Fight Music (Produced by Guns-N-Butter) (2010)
- Your Favorite MC (Produced by Snowgoons) (2011)
- Year of the Hyenas (with King Syze) (2014)
- The Fast Way (Produced by Emynd) (2014)
- In Death Reborn (with Army of the Pharaohs) (2014)
- Heavy Lies the Crown (with Army of the Pharaohs) (2014)
- Furious Styles (Produced by Bear-One) (2016)
- The Airing of Grievances (Produced by Haj of Dumhi) (2020)
- Reef the Lost Cauze Iz Alive (Produced by Caliph-Now) (2022)
- Murderers Row (with King Syze, OuterSpace & Snowgoons) (2025)

== Extended plays ==
- Big Deal (2009)
- Sirens on Snyder (Produced by Haj of Dumhi) (2013)

== Mixtapes ==
- Long Live The Cauze Vol I (2006)
- Long Live The Cauze Vol II (I Am Legend) (2008)
- King & The Cauze (with King Magnetic) (2009)
- Raiders of the Lost Art (2010)
- Reef the Lost Cauze Is Dead (2012)

== Guest appearances ==
- Dr. Noh - Contradiction Volume 1 (2003)
  - ??
- Chief Kamachi - Cult Status (2004)
  - "#13" (Feat. Reef)
- Random - The Call (2005)
  - "Luminescence" (Feat. Reef & Neo P)
- Access Immortal - New York Yankee (2006)
  - "The Formula Freestyle" (Feat. Reef & Verbal Tec)
- Snowgoons - German Lugers (2007)
  - "Never" (Feat. Reef)
  - "No Guts No GLory" (Feat. Reef, O.C. & Rasco)
- GAZA - Drumline Anthem (2007)
  - ??
- Dev Rocka - The Night Shift (2007)
  - "Dutches & Phillies" (Feat. NY Rhyme Exchange & Reef)
  - "Curtains" (Feat. Planet Asia & Reef)
  - "In the End" (Feat. Reef)
- The Returners & Radio Rewers - Do You (2008)
  - "Where You Gonna Hide?" (Feat. Reef & Pumpkinhead)
- Snowgoons - Black Snow (2008)
  - "The Curse" (Feat. King Magnetic, Charon Don, Sicknature & Reef)
  - "This is Where the Fun Stops" (Feat. Reef)
- Rob Kelly - St Patricks Day Massacre (2009)
  - "Shook Crews Runnin" (Feat. Reef)
- Yameen - Never Knows More (2009)
  - "Pull Ya Cash Out" (Feat. Maylay Sparks & Reef)
- J.J. Brown - Connect the Dots (2009)
  - "Pure Grind" (Feat. Reef)
- Le Sous Marin - Causes Perdues (2010)
  - "Atmosphere Primaire" (Feat. Reef)
- TReBeats - The Urge to Change Something (2011)
  - "Reality of Doom" (Feat. Reef, Unknown Mizery & Gutta)
- Tim Timebomb - Hellcat (2013)
  - "If the Music Ain't Loud" (Feat. Reef & STWB)
- DJ Fatte - Soundtrack (2013)
  - "Pochop to" (Feat. Reef & Separ)
- Snowgoons - Black Snow 2 (2013)
  - "Party Crashers" (Feat. Reef)
  - "Reel Wolf: The Underworld" (GoonMusik Remix)
- Obi Khan "Voices In My Head" featuring Reef The Lost Cauze & Taiyamo Denku (2018)
- Snowgoons, Planetary & King Syze - Murderers' Row (2025)
  - "Murderers' Row"
  - "Yard Rec"
  - "The Most Imperial"
  - "Heat Wave"
  - "Death Penalty"
  - "187"
  - "Something Outta Nothing"

== Singles as featured ==
- The Returners - "Ready for War" (Feat. A.O.T.P.) (2013)
- Spirit of Truth - "No Matter What" (Feat. A.O.T.P.) (2013)
