= God's Fury =

Studio album by OuterSpace
- Released: September 30, 2008
- Genre: Hip hop
- Label: Babygrande
- Producer: Clockwork; Davyd Done; Dennis Post; Juan Muteniac; Malice Beats; MTK; Sake; Scott "Supe" Stallone; Sev-One; Sicknature; Skammadix; Undefined

OuterSpace chronology
Blood Brothers (2006)	God's Fury (2008)	My Brother's Keeper (2011)

Professional ratings
Review scores
Source	Rating
RapReviews	8.5/10

God's Fury is the third studio album by American hip hop duo OuterSpace. It was released on September 30, 2008, through Babygrande Records. Production was handled by MTK, Sake, Clockwork, Davyd Done, Dennis Post, Juan Muteniac, Malice Beats, Scott "Supe" Stallone, Sev-One, Sicknature, Skammadix and Undefined. It features guest appearances from Abdiel, Celph Titled, Chief Kamachi, Des Devious, Doap Nixon, King Magnetic, King Syze, Lawrence Arnell, Psycho Realm, Reef the Lost Cauze and Vinnie Paz.

== Track listing ==
No.	Title	Producer(s)	Length
1.	"Laws of Fire (Intro)"	Sake	1:09
2.	"Hail Mary"	MTK	3:51
3.	"Quick Draw" (featuring Doap Nixon and Lawrence Arnell)	Undefined	4:09
4.	"What the Future Holds"	Davyd Done	3:36
5.	"Lost Battles" (featuring Reef the Lost Cauze)	Clockwork	3:49
6.	"Is It a Crime (Interlude)"	Sake	1:38
7.	"American Me"	Scott "Supe" Stallone	3:37
8.	"Gods and Generals 2" (featuring Des Devious and King Syze)	MTK	4:11
9.	"Living the Life"	MTK	3:01
10.	"Anointing of the Sick" (featuring Psycho Realm and Abdiel)	MTK	4:51
11.	"Mourning Sun (Interlude)"	Sake	1:30
12.	"Nicko"	Malice Beats	4:34
13.	"The Killing Fields" (featuring Vinnie Paz and King Magnetic)	Juan Muteniac	4:29
14.	"Love Don't Pay"	Sev-One	3:29
15.	"The Last Supper" (featuring Celph Titled and Chief Kamachi)	Dennis Post; Sicknature	4:59
16.	"Our Father"	Skammadix	3:27
