= Snowgoons Dynasty =

Studio album by Snowgoons
- Released: July 17, 2012
- Genre: Hardcore rap; underground hip-hop
- Length: 1:53:35
- Label: Babygrande
- Producer: Chuck Wilson (exec.); DJ Illegal (also exec.); Snowgoons; Grim Reaperz

Snowgoons chronology
| Terroristen Volk (2012) | Snowgoons Dynasty (2012) | Welcome to the Goondox (2013) |

Snowgoons Dynasty is the tenth studio album by German hip-hop production team the Snowgoons. Pressed as a double album, it was released on July 17, 2012, via Babygrande Records. It features guest appearances from various hip-hop recording artists, including Fredro Starr, Ghostface Killah, Ill Bill, Joell Ortiz, Killah Priest, Krondon, L.A.R.S., Lil' Fame, Planet Asia, Ras Kass, Reef the Lost Cauze, Sabac Red, Sean Price, Sicknature, Swifty McVay, Termanology, Thirstin Howl III, and Tragedy Khadafi among others. The album peaked at number 75 on the Top R&B/Hip-Hop Albums and number 47 on the Heatseekers Albums.

== Track listing ==
| No. | Title | Length |
|---|---|---|
| 1. | "Snowgoons Dynasty, Pt. 2" (featuring Freestyle) | 2:32 |
| 2. | "Get Off The Ground" (featuring Hannibal Stax, Justin Tyme, Lil' Fame, Sean Price & Termanology) | 5:49 |
| 3. | "What U Do This For" (featuring Krush Unit) | 3:04 |
| 4. | "John McEnroe" (featuring N.B.S. & Sicknature) | 3:59 |
| 5. | "Better Day" (featuring Lyriciss) | 2:29 |
| 6. | "Goonsville" (featuring Blaq Poet & Usual Suspectz) | 3:23 |
| 7. | "Cardiac Rhythm" (featuring Sean Strange) | 3:58 |
| 8. | "Queens" (featuring Crookz Green, El Toro, Royal Flush & Scott G) | 3:48 |
| 9. | "Street Passion" (featuring Rozewood) | 3:58 |
| 10. | "Fight Club" (featuring Checkmark, E-Flash, Knowbodies & Smiley) | 4:52 |
| 11. | "Akhenaten (One)" (featuring Hasan Salaam) | 2:18 |
| 12. | "What That West Like" (featuring Aims, Banish, Krondon, Planet Asia & Ras Kass) | 4:44 |
| 13. | "Turistas" (featuring Blacastan) | 2:14 |
| 14. | "Press Ya Luck" (featuring Mykill Miers) | 3:31 |
| 15. | "The Legacy" (featuring Esoteric, Fredro Starr, Godilla, Ill Bill, M-Dot, Maylay Sparks, Planetary, Punchline, Reef the Lost Cauze, Reks, Sav Killz, Sicknature, Swann, Thirstin Howl III & Virtuoso) | 5:54 |
| 16. | "Missing Pages" (featuring Revolution Of The Mind & Sabac Red) | 3:00 |
| 17. | "Goon Musick" (featuring Sicknature) | 2:26 |
| 18. | "The Cypher" (featuring Aspects, Ghostface Killah, Killah Priest & Swisha T) | 4:27 |
| 19. | "Concentrate" (featuring Prop Dylan) | 4:19 |
| 20. | "Get Down" (featuring B.A.M.) | 3:38 |
| 21. | "Born To Spit" (featuring Fel Sweetenberg) | 3:23 |
| 22. | "Prayn In the Rain" (featuring Eshon Burgundy) | 3:01 |
| 23. | "Shutout" (featuring Dirt Platoon) | 3:01 |
| 24. | "Snowbiz" (featuring Faez One & Main Flow) | 3:18 |
| 25. | "Take Notes" (featuring Lady Repo & N.B.S.) | 3:21 |
| 26. | "The Rapture" (featuring L.A.R.S., Meth Mouth, Sean Strange & Swifty McVay) | 3:42 |
| 27. | "First Cousins" (featuring Codey, Finsta Bundy, Joell Ortiz & O Doub) | 3:55 |
| 28. | "Reality Check" (featuring Respect Tha God & Tribeca) | 2:42 |
| 29. | "That's Me" (featuring Nutso) | 2:31 |
| 30. | "Hood Ikon" (featuring Tragedy Khadafi (Produced by AZA) | 3:42 |
| 31. | "Grim Reaper" (featuring Freestyle & Grim Reaperz) | 3:21 |
| 32. | "Rear Naked Choke" (featuring Viro the Virus) | 3:15 |
| Total length: | | 1:53:35 |

== Personnel ==
- Manuel "DJ Illegal" Rückert – primary artist, producer (tracks: 1–30, 32), executive producer
- Johann Sebastian Kuster – primary artist, producer (tracks: 1–30, 32)
- D. "Det Gunner" Keller – primary artist, producer (tracks: 1–30, 32)
- Charles Wilson Jr. – executive producer
- DJ Danetic – scratches (tracks: 18, 30, 32)
- XRatedTheDj – scratches (track 14)

== Charts ==
| Chart (2012) | Peak position |
|---|---|
| Swiss Albums (Schweizer Hitparade) | 79 |
| US Top R&B/Hip-Hop Albums (Billboard) | 75 |
| US Heatseekers Albums (Billboard) | 47 |
