= Sour Diesel II =

Studio album by Doap Nixon
- Released: July 23, 2019
- Recorded: 2018–2019
- Genres: Underground hip hop, hardcore hip hop
- Length: 46:51
- Label: Babygrande Records

Doap Nixon chronology
Doap Traffiking (2011)	Sour Diesel II (2019)

Singles from Sour Diesel II
- 1. "The One"; 2. "Murda Fantasia"; 3. "Philly Streets"

Professional ratings
Review scores
Source	Rating
RapReviews	3.5/5 stars
HipHopDX	3/5 stars

Sour Diesel II is the fourth studio album by underground rapper and former Army of the Pharaohs member Doap Nixon.The album was released on July 23, 2019.

== Background ==
On February 24, 2014, it was announced that Doap Nixon was working on his fourth studio album, titled Sour Diesel 2, a sequel to his debut album Sour Diesel. It was confirmed he was working on a single called "Prison Rap" which was said to be featuring Sean Price.

The album was released on June 20, 2019, after being in production for four years. It featured vocals from Army of the Pharaoh members Vinnie Paz, Lawrence Arnell, Reef the Lost Cauze, and Planetary, as well as vocals from Sean Price and Good Money. He released the music video for the third single of the album, Philly Streets on August 10, 2019. Although the album was originally supposed to feature King Magnetic, his verses were removed from the album at the request of Vinnie Paz.

== Controversy ==
On February 13, 2020, Doap Nixon and King Magnetic both released diss tracks to Vinnie Paz. Within their tracks, they both announced their departure from the supergroup. The issues between the pair and AOTP supposedly started in 2009 with trivial matters, which was squashed in 2016. Magnetic found Paz after at a show in Albuquerque and agreed to stop the differences they had. With Nixon's release of Sour Diesel II, Paz threatened to remove his lyrics and track contributions unless Doap removed King Magnetic's verses from the album and as a result released the diss track "Be Quiet", which was recorded years earlier. Subsequently, Nixon released the diss track "Leg Shot".

== Track listing ==
No.	Title	Length
1.	"Intro (90"s)"	3:36
2.	"Murder Fantasia" (featuring Vinnie Paz and Nita Ni)	2:43
3.	"Life You Gave Us"	3:58
4.	"We Are Not the Same" (featuring V Zilla and Lawrence Arnell)	3:21
5.	"Philly Streets"	3:57
6.	"Still Brothers" (featuring Planetary)	2:43
7.	"Stop the Hating"	2:32
8.	"Live My Life" (featuring Lawrence Arnell)	4:07
9.	"Body Count" (featuring Esoteric, Vinnie Paz and Reef the Lost Cauze)	4:05
10.	"Willy Wignut (Skit)"	1:52
11.	"Just Venting 2"	1:37
12.	"Drive By" (featuring Good Money)	2:27
13.	"The One" (featuring Sean Price)	3:11
14.	"Outro"	1:57
Total length:		44:21
