= My Brother's Keeper (OuterSpace album) =

Studio album by OuterSpace
- Released: August 23, 2011
- Genre: Underground hip hop
- Length: 48:34
- Label: Enemy Soil
- Producer: Skammadix, MTK, Nero, DC The Midi Alien, Vanderslice, C-Lance, Cynic, DJ Soundtrax

OuterSpace chronology
God's Fury (2008)	My Brother's Keeper (2011)	Lost in Space (2015)

My Brother's Keeper is the fourth studio album from underground hip hop duo OuterSpace, released on August 23, 2011 by Enemy Soil. The album features collaborations by Vinnie Paz, Ill Bill, Doap Nixon, Apathy, Blacastan, Esoteric, Sick Jacken, King Syze, and Zilla.

== Track listing ==
#	Title	Producer(s)	Performer (s)
1	"My Brother's Keeper"	Skammadix	Planetary, Crypt the Warchild
2	"Mossberg Solution"	MTK	Planetary, Crypt the Warchild, Vinnie Paz
3	"Cold Day In Hell"	Nero	Planetary, Crypt the Warchild
4	"Demonic Prophecies"	DC the Midi Alien	Planetary, Crypt the Warchild, Ill Bill
5	"Behead The Kings"	Vanderslice	Planetary, Crypt the Warchild
6	"Slap'em Up"	DC the Midi Alien	Planetary, Crypt the Warchild, Doap Nixon
7	"Get Ridiculous"	MTK	Planetary, Crypt the Warchild, Apathy
8	"Written in Blood"	DC the Midi Alien	Planetary, Crypt the Warchild
9	"Bodega Gospel"	MTK	Planetary, Crypt the Warchild, Blacastan & Esoteric
10	"World Of Fear"	C-Lance	Planetary, Crypt the Warchild
11	"Lost Angels"	Cynic	Planetary, Crypt the Warchild, Sick Jacken
12	"Clear Out"	DC the Midi Alien	Planetary, Crypt the Warchild, King Syze & V-Zilla
13	"Heaven"	DJ Soundtrax	Planetary, Crypt the Warchild
