= Doap Nixon =

American Hip Hop artist and rapper

- Also known as: Darth Nixon, Doap Nikkles, Nikkle Bagz
- Born: Kenneth Greene; August 12, 1984 (age 41)
- Origin: Philadelphia, United States
- Genres: Hip hop
- Years active: 1999–present
- Label: Babygrande
- Website: doapnix.com

Kenneth Greene (born August 12, 1984), better known by his stage name Doap Nixon, is an American hip hop artist and rapper who is a former member of supergroup Army of the Pharaohs. He has collaborated with a variety of underground hip hop artists and released his debut full solo album, Sour Diesel in 2008.

In 2009, it was announced that Army of the Pharaohs was working on their third studio album, titled The Unholy Terror. It was confirmed that Doap Nixon was to make a comeback in the group and featured on the album. The official street release date was March 30, 2010, but the album was released early on March 19, 2010, on UGHH.com. In late 2010, Doap stepped forward with his second album, Gray Poupon. It was known for Doap asserting his voice and perspective, outside of his lyrical cartel. Shortly after the release of Gray Poupon, Doap announced that he was working on his third studio album, titled Doap Traffiking: The Rise And Fall Of Darth Nixon. The album was officially released on November 17, 2011.

Doap Nixon was also on the fourth Army of the Pharaohs album In Death Reborn. New members including Blacastan of The Demigodz and Zilla from Houston, Texas were said to be joining the group. His final appearance for the supergroup was on the album Heavy Lies the Crown. He released his fourth studio album Sour Diesel II in 2019.

== Biography ==
=== Early career (1999–2004) ===
I was good at remembering things and rhyming came naturally to me. I used to do cyphers and house parties with Jedi Mind Tricks and OuterSpace, so we had a knack for rapping.

— Nixon on his career start.

A native of Philadelphia, Doap Nixon began writing music at the age of 12. He found that "music was a way he could express himself and did so anytime he could find time." Jedi Mind Tricks frontman Vinnie Paz met Doap Nixon in 1998 through OuterSpace and King Syze, as he lived in the same hood as them. Paz gave him his first official work was 2000 on his Raw Is War 12" vinyl on the track Language is Fatal. He later went on to feature on King Syze's track Philly's Finest in 2002. Although he has been at this for a while, his notable start came through his work with Army Of The Pharaohs.

=== Sour Diesel and Army of the Pharaohs (2005–2009) ===
Sour Diesel was Doap's debut album and was released on July 22, 2008. A long time mainstay in the thriving Philadelphia independent hip-hop scene, Doap Nixon is best known for his breakout performance on Army of the Pharaohs (the supergroup fronted by Vinnie Paz of Jedi Mind Tricks) in their late 2007 underground smash Ritual of Battle. Amidst a groundswell of anticipation, Doap unveiled his debut LP, Sour Diesel, which features guest appearances from the core AOTP clique, including powerhouse Vinnie Paz, OuterSpace, King Syze, King Magnetic, Reef The Lost Cauze and more as well as production from some of independent, most renowned and respected hip hop producers such as Apathy, Snowgoons, Stu Bangas, Undefined, Stress, Skammadix amongst others. His song, The Wait Is Over, was also featured on the soundtrack for the video game Midnight Club: Los Angeles.

=== The Unholy Terror, Gray Poupon, Doap Trafficking (2009–2012) ===
It's been a long time coming for this project, and due to the negative forces that tried to prevent this from materializing, Gray Poupon is more than a Music Album, it is a statement of how strong a family AOTP is and the strength and perseverance I possess. This album is the perfect follow up to my freshman album Sour Diesel, I display Growth as well as talent that most already knew I possess but for those who did not know; Pleasure to meet you. This album features are at a minimum because I wanted to show more of Doaps talents but still have my core AOTP members Celph Titled, Outerspace, Journalist, Burke the Jurke, Sick Six, Block McCloud, Chief Kamachi, Capo & Rellik. As for the Producers man, there are so many heaters on this Album that it wouldn't be fair to name them now.

— Nixon, in promotion for Gray Poupon.

In 2009, it was announced that Army of the Pharaohs were working on their third studio album, titled The Unholy Terror. It was confirmed that Doap Nixon was to make a comeback in the group and featured on the album. The official street release date was March 30, 2010, but the album was released early on March 19, 2010, on UGHH.com. The album debuted in the Billboard 200 at number 179 selling 3,200 units in its first week of release. Apathy, who wasn't featured on the previous album returned to the group and new additions were added to the roster including; Block McCloud and Journalist. Chief Kamachi, however, got into a feud with Vinnie Paz and Apathy and therefore decided to leave AOTP.

Late 2010, Doap stepped forward with his second album; Gray Poupon. It was known for Doap asserting his voice and perspective, outside of his lyrical cartel. Doap raps about his catalogue, listing credits and collaborations, and compares them against other emcees ascending into the public eye. The album included appearances from fellow Army of the Pharaohs members; Celph Titled, Journalist, Block McCloud, Planetary, Crypt the Warchild and former member Chief Kamachi. Other artists including Killa Rellik, Sick Six, Capo, and Burke the Jurke were also featured on the album. The album was officially released on 28 February 2011 on iTunes, via Q-Demented.

Shortly after the release of Gray Poupon, Doap announced that he is working on his third studio album titled: Doap Traffiking: The Rise And Fall Of Darth Nixon. The album was officially released on 17 November 2011. Fellow pharaohs; Apathy, Blacastan, Celph Titled, Demoz, Esoteric, King Magnetic, Reef The Lost Cauze, OuterSpace, V-Zilla, Vinnie Paz and other artists including Helen Sciandra, Cynthia Holliday and Ill Bill were all featured on the album. Producers include; C-Lance, Illbred, Many Beats, Rythmatik, Level 13 and DC The Mid Alien. In 2012 Doap Nixon appeared on the song "Microphone Controllers" with Long Island emcees Dave Z(The MC) and Lantz.

=== In Death Reborn and Sour Diesel 2 (2013–2019) ===
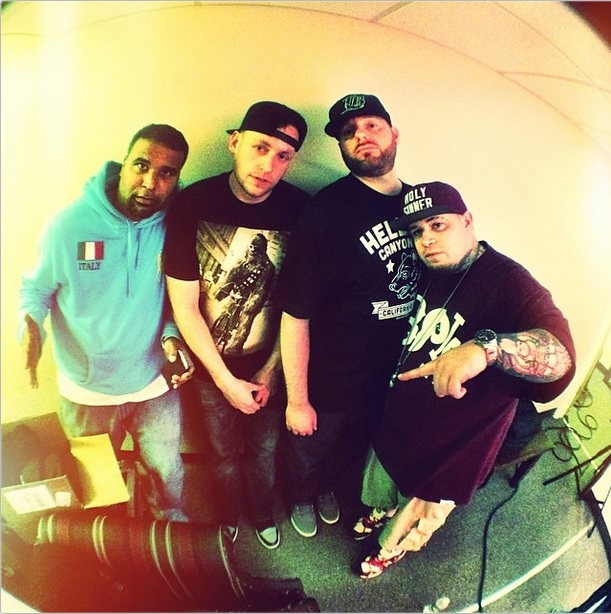
Nixon, Esoteric, Celph and Paz.

On November 30, 2013, Vinnie Paz revealed that two new Army Of The Pharaohs albums would be released in 2014. In Death Reborn is slated for a release on 22 April and the second LP is expected to drop in November. Doap Nixon is confirmed to be on the upcoming albums. New members including Blacastan of The Demigodz and Zilla from Houston, Texas are said to be joining the group.

On February 24, 2014, it was announced that Doap Nixon was working on his fourth studio album titled Sour Diesel II, a sequel to his debut critically acclaimed album; Sour Diesel. It was confirmed he is working on a single called "Prison Rap" which is said to be featuring Sean Price.

The album was officially released on June 20, 2019, after being in production for four years. It featured vocals from Army of the Pharaoh members Vinnie Paz, Lawrence Arnell, Reef the Lost Cauze, and Planetary, as well as vocals from Sean Price and Good Money. He released the music video for the third single of the album, Philly Streets on August 10, 2019. Although the album was originally supposed to feature King Magnetic, his verses were removed from the album at the request of Vinnie Paz.

=== Departure from AOTP (2020–present) ===
On February 13, 2020, Doap Nixon and King Magnetic both released diss tracks to Vinnie Paz. Within their tracks, they both announced their departure from the supergroup. The issues between the pair and AOTP supposedly started in 2009 with trivial matters, which was squashed in 2016. Magnetic found Paz after at a show in Albuquerque and agreed to stop the differences they had. With Nixon's release of Sour Diesel II, Paz threatened to remove his lyrics and track contributions unless Doap removed King Magnetic's verses from the album and as a result released the diss track "Be Quiet", which was recorded years earlier. Subsequently, Nixon released the diss track "Leg Shot".

== Discography ==
Studio albums

- Sour Diesel (2008)
- Gray Poupon (2011)
- Doap Traffiking: The Rise and Fall of Darth Nixon (2011)
- Sour Diesel II (2019)

Collaborative albums

- Ritual of Battle (with Army of the Pharaohs) (2007)
- The Unholy Terror (with Army of the Pharaohs) (2010)
- In Death Reborn (with Army of the Pharaohs) (2014)
- Heavy Lies the Crown (with Army of the Pharaohs) (2014)
