= Wise Intelligent =

American rapper

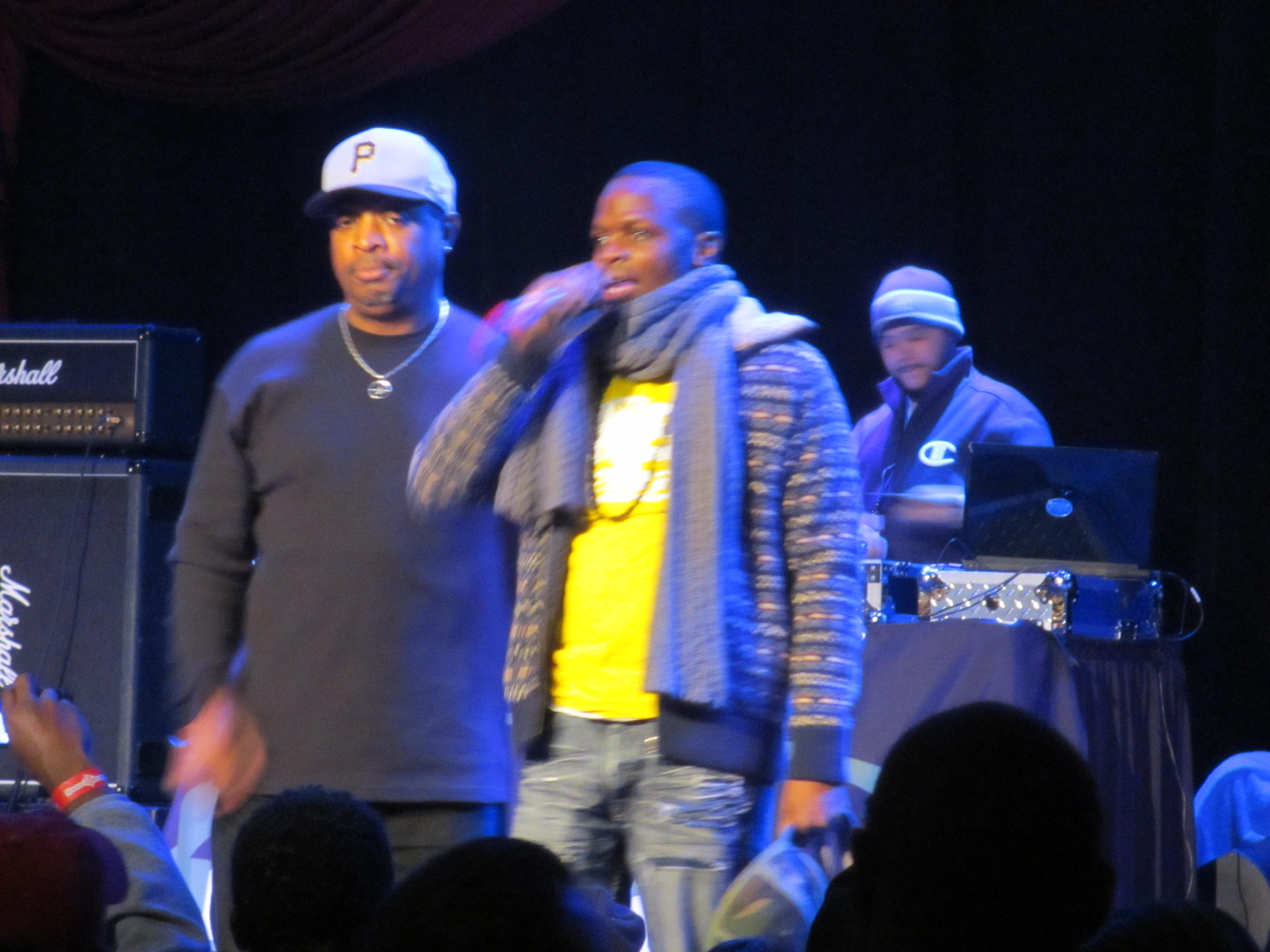

Background information
- Born: Timothy Grimes; April 10, 1970 (age 56); New Brunswick, New Jersey, U.S.
- Origin: Trenton, New Jersey, U.S.
- Genres: Hip-hop
- Occupations: Rapper; producer
- Years active: 1989–present
- Labels: Contract Recording Company; Intelligent Muzik; Shaman Work
- Website: www.wiseintelligent.com

Timothy Grimes, better known by his stage name Wise Intelligent, is an American rapper from Trenton, New Jersey. He is a member of Poor Righteous Teachers. He released The Talented Timothy Taylor in 2007. His third solo studio album, The Unconkable Djezuz Djonez, was released in 2011. In 2012, Complex included him on its 50 Most Slept-on Rappers of All Time list and About.com included him on its list of the 10 Most Underappreciated Rappers. In 2017, he released a collaborative album with Gensu Dean, titled Game of Death.

== Discography ==
=== Studio albums ===
- Killin' U... for Fun (1996)
- The Talented Timothy Taylor (2007)
- The Unconkable Djezuz Djonez (2011)
- El Negro Guerrero (2013)
- Stevie Bonneville Wallace (2016)
- The Blue Klux Klan (2017)
- Game of Death (with Gensu Dean) (2017)
- Ponzie (2018)

=== Compilation albums ===
- Blessed Be the Poor? (2007)

=== Extended plays ===
- Omnicide (with Snowgoons) (2020)

=== Singles ===
- "Killin'-U" b/w "Tu-Shoom-Pang" (1995)
- "Rastafarian Girl" (1996)
- "Never Kill Again" b/w "Freestyle" (1996)
- "Steady Slangin'" b/w "My Sound" (1996)

=== Guest appearances ===
- Steve Harvey - "I'm the One" (1990)
- Professor Griff - "Verbal Intercourse" from Black Draft (1993)
- Nitty Gritty - "Good Morning Teacher" (1995)
- Assassin - "Wake Up! (Réveillez-Vous!)" from Perles Rares (1989-2002) (2004)
- Jel - "WMD" from Soft Money (2006)
- Blue Sky Black Death - "Engage My Words" from A Heap of Broken Images (2006)
- Oh No - "Black" from Exodus into Unheard Rhythms (2006)
- Snowgoons - "Teacher's Trademark" from German Lugers (2007)
- Truth Universal - "Black Culture" from Self Determination (2008)
- Blee - "Figured Out" from Cosmos Road (2010)
- Bombshell - "The Highest" from The Premix (2010)
- Rockin' Squat - "Démocratie Fasciste (Article 5)" from Confessions d'un Enfant du Siècle: Volume 3 (2010)
- Rockin' Squat - "Démocratie Fasciste (Article 5)" and "Wake Up" from US Alien (Chapter One) (2011)
- Reef the Lost Cauze & Snowgoons - "Mount Up" from Your Favorite MC (2011)
- Beneficence - "Royal Dynasty (Remix)" from Sidewalk Science (2011)
- J. Rawls - "Face It" from The Hip-Hop Affect (2011)
- Billions - "Die Slow" from A Secret Worth Billions (2012)
- Def Dee - "Lightning I'm Igniting" from 33 and a Third (2013)
- The White Shadow - "Trust Issues" from Destroyer (2014)
