= Sour Diesel (album) =

Studio album by Doap Nixon
- Released: July 18, 2008
- Recorded: 2006–2008
- Studio: Found Sound Recording (Philadelphia, PA); Cru-Cut Studios; 100 Proof Studios
- Genre: Hip-hop
- Label: Babygrande
- Producer: Cence; Chris Kearns; Cimer Amor; J.$crilla; Rhythmatik; Snowgoons; Stu Bangas; Undefined; Vanderslice

Doap Nixon chronology
Sour Diesel (2008)	Gray Poupon (2010)

Professional ratings
Review scores
Source	Rating
RapReviews	7/10

Sour Diesel is the debut solo studio album by American rapper Doap Nixon. It was released on July 18, 2008 via Babygrande Records. Recording sessions took place at Found Sound Recording in Philadelphia, Cru-Cut Studios and 100 Proof Studios. Production was handled by Stu Bangas, Vanderslice, Cence, Chris Kearns, Cimer Amor, J.$crilla, Rhythmatik, Snowgoons and Undefined. It features guest appearances from Reef the Lost Cauze, OuterSpace, Demoz, Good Money, Cynthia Holliday, King Magnetic, King Syze, Nature, N.I.Z. and Vinnie Paz.

The album's cut "The Wait Is Over" appeared on the soundtrack for 2008 video game Midnight Club: Los Angeles. The album's sequel, Sour Diesel II, was released in 2019.

== Background ==
After joining Army of the Pharaohs in 2007 for Ritual of Battle, Doap Nixon unveiled his debut full-length Sour Diesel under Jedi Mind Tricks Presents banner.

AllMusic's Matt Rinaldi called the album "an underground rap tour-de-force", praising Nixon's "hardcore lyrical approach that alternates between assault-force aggression and pensive introspection".

== Track listing ==
No.	Title	Writer(s)	Producer(s)	Length
1.	"Intro"	Kenneth Greene; Charlie Griggs	Rhythmatik	1:30
2.	"Behind the Music"	Greene; Stuart Hudgins	Stu Bangas	3:42
3.	"Tis the Season" (featuring Nature and Good Money)	Greene; Jermaine Baxter; G. Johnson; Hudgins	Stu Bangas	3:46
4.	"The Wait Is Over" (featuring Reef the Lost Cauze and Vinnie Paz)	Greene; Sharif Lacey; Vincenzo Luviner; Hudgins	Stu Bangas	3:48
5.	"Heaven Is Calling" (featuring Cynthia Holliday)	Greene; Cynthia Holliday; Manuel Rückert	Snowgoons	4:05
6.	"Everything's Changing"	Greene; M. Henzey	Undefined	4:05
7.	"Just Venting" (Skit)	Greene; C. Chagniot	Cence	2:20
8.	"Get Dirty" (featuring Reef the Lost Cauze and Demoz)	Greene; Lacey; Jose Vargas; Jeff Clarkin	J.$crilla	5:03
9.	"Warning Shot" (featuring King Syze, OuterSpace and King Magnetic)	Greene; Daniel Albaladejo; Marcus Albaladejo; Mario Collazo; Jason Faust; Eric Vanderslice	Vanderslice	5:22
10.	"Don't Blame Us" (featuring N.I.Z.)	Greene; N. Rodriguez; Cimer Amor	Cimer Amor	4:13
11.	"Respect My G." (featuring Good Money)	Greene; Johnson; Chris Kearns	Chris Kearns	4:23
12.	"Gangsta" (featuring Demoz, Reef the Lost Cauze and Planetary)	Greene; Vargas; Lacey; Collazo; Vanderslice	Vanderslice	4:34

== Personnel ==
- Kenneth "Doap Nixon" Greene – vocals
- Jermaine "Nature" Baxter – vocals (track 3)
- G. "Good Money" Johnson – vocals (tracks: 3, 11)
- Sharif "Reef the Lost Cauze" Lacey – vocals (tracks: 4, 8, 12)
- Vincenzo "Vinnie Paz" Luvineri – vocals (track 4), executive producer
- Cynthia Holliday – vocals (track 5)
- Jose "Demoz" Vargas – vocals (tracks: 8, 12)
- Daniel "King Syze" Albaladejo – vocals (track 9)
- Marcus "Crypt the Warchild" Albaladejo – vocals (track 9)
- Mario "Planetary" Collazo – vocals (tracks: 9, 12)
- Jason "King Magnetic" Faust – vocals (track 9)
- N. "N.I.Z." Rodriguez – vocals (track 10)
- DJ Slipwax – scratches (track 4)
- Charlie "Rhythmatik" Griggs – producer (track 1)
- Stuart "Stu Bangas" Hudgins – producer (tracks: 2–4)
- Snowgoons – producer & mixing (track 5)
- M. "Undefined" Henzey – producer (track 6)
- Cence Chagniot – producer (track 7)
- Jeff "J Scrilla" Clarkin – producer (track 8)
- Eric Vanderslice – producer (tracks: 9, 12)
- Cimer Amor – producer (track 10)
- Chris Kearns – producer & mixing (track 11)
- Scott "Supe" Stallone – recording & mixing (tracks: 1–4, 6–10, 12), mastering
- Charles "Chuck" Wilson, Jr. – executive producer
- Dan Bradley – photography
