= Sour Diesel =

Strain of cannabis

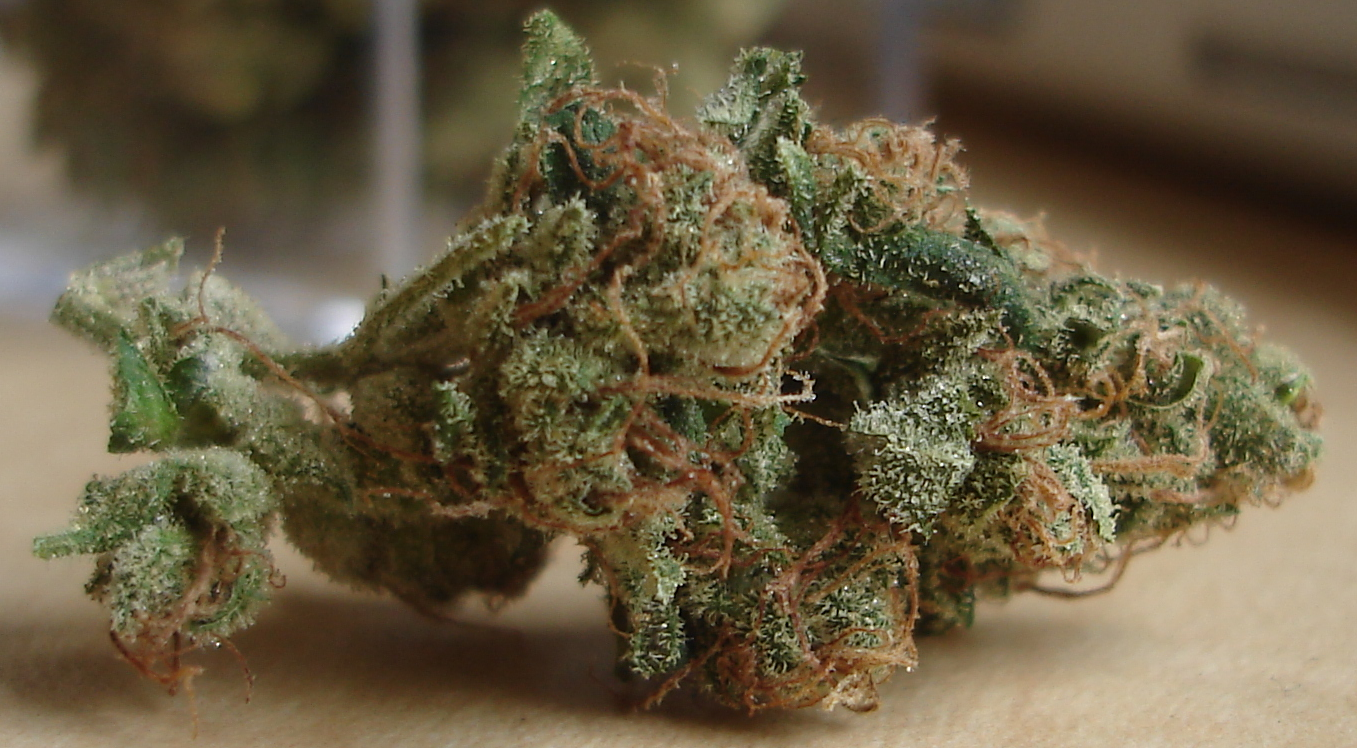
- A bud of Sour Diesel showing trichomes.
- Genus: Cannabis
- Species: Cannabis sativa dominant hybrid

Sour Diesel is a hybrid strain of mainly Cannabis sativa parentage. It originates from a cross of the strains Chemdawg × Super Skunk.

== In popular culture ==
Sour Diesel has appeared in works by Ryan David Jahn and Toby Rogers. The strain's name inspired the titles of Doap Nixon albums Sour Diesel and Sour Diesel II, as well as a single by Dame Grease. The Flatbush Zombies single "Face-Off", a rap song about recreational drug use, also mentions Sour Diesel at the start of its second verse: "Perfect day, 10 bitches, and some sour diesel." It is a favorite strain of rapper Wiz Khalifa. In season 3 episode 4 of the TV show Broad City, Sour Diesel is featured as one of the cannabis-strains in possession of one of the two main characters. Natanael Cano also released a song named "Sour Diesel", which is his second song released as a single. In Zayn Malik's 2018 album Icarus Falls the 16th track is named "Sour Diesel".

== See also ==
- Cannabis strains
- Medical cannabis
