= Doap Traffiking: The Rise and Fall of Darth Nixon =

Doap Traffiking

Studio album by Doap Nixon
- Released: 17 November 2011
- Recorded: 2010–2011
- Genre: Underground hip hop, hardcore hip hop
- Length: 44:21
- Label: Babygrande Records; Nickle Bagz Productions

Doap Nixon chronology
Gray Poupon (2011)	Doap Traffiking (2011)	Sour Diesel II (2019)

Doap Traffiking: The Rise and Fall of Darth Nixon (most commonly abbreviated as Doap Traffiking) is the third studio album by underground rapper and Army of the Pharaohs member Doap Nixon. It was released a few months after Doaps second album; Gray Poupon.

== Background ==
Shortly after the release of Gray Poupon, Doap announced that he is working on his third studio album titled: Doap Traffiking: The Rise And Fall Of Darth Nixon. The album was officially released on 17 November 2011. Fellow pharaohs; Apathy, Blacastan, Celph Titled, Demoz, Esoteric, King Magnetic, Reef The Lost Cauze, OuterSpace, V-Zilla, Vinnie Paz and other artists including Helen Sciandra, Cynthia Holliday and Ill Bill were all featured on the album. Producers include; C-Lance, Illbred, Many Beats, Rythmatik, Level 13 and DC The Mid Alien.

== Track listing ==
No.	Title	Producer	Length
1.	"Intro" (Feat. Blacastan)	Rythmatic	1:41
2.	"The Bizness" (Feat. Blacastan & Esoteric)	NY Grim Reapers	3:43
3.	"Wherever I Go" (Feat. Demoz, Zilla & Helen Sciandra)	Illbred	4:48
4.	"Darkside"	Level 13	2:44
5.	"Never Look Back" (Feat. OuterSpace)	C-Lance	3:53
6.	"Heaven Is Still Calling" (Feat. Cynthia Holliday)	Illbred	4:17
7.	"Legendary"	C-Lance	3:06
8.	"Deadly Sins" (Feat. Heavy Metal Kings & King & The Cauze)	C-Lance	5:34
9.	"Fly"	C-Lance	3:25
10.	"One More Chance" (Feat. Demoz)	Many Beats	2:41
11.	"Bang" (Feat. Apathy & Celph Titled)	C-Lance	2:44
12.	"Outro"	Rythmatik	1:29
13.	"Grand Opening (Remix) (Bonus)" (Feat. Reef the Lost Cauze & Vinnie Paz)	DC The Midi Alien	4:16
Total length:			44:21
