= Sparta (album) =

Studio album by M.O.P. & Snowgoons
- Released: November 22, 2011
- Genre: Hardcore hip-hop
- Length: 34:03
- Label: Babygrande
- Producer: Chuck Wilson (exec.); Snowgoons

M.O.P. chronology
Foundation (2009)	Sparta (2011)	Street Certified (2014)

Snowgoons chronology
Your Favorite MC (2011)	Sparta (2011)	Terroristen Volk (2012)

Professional ratings
Review scores
Source	Rating
AllMusic	3.5/5 stars
RapReviews	8.5/10
XXL	3/5

Sparta is a collaborative studio album by American rap duo M.O.P. and German hip-hop production team Snowgoons. It was released on November 22, 2011, through Babygrande Records. The album did not reach the US Billboard 200, however, it peaked at number 67 on the Top R&B/Hip-Hop Albums chart.

== Track listing ==
No.	Title	Length
1.	"Sparta"	3:38
2.	"Back at It"	3:37
3.	"Get Yours"	3:48
4.	"Blasphemy (Blast 4 Me)"	3:40
5.	"Opium"	3:24
6.	"Hard Niggaz"	2:40
7.	"Rollin'"	4:21
8.	"No Mercy"	2:34
9.	"Break 'Em"	3:20
10.	"Body on the Iron"	3:01
Total length:		34:03

== Charts ==
Chart (2011)	Peak position
US Top R&B/Hip-Hop Albums (Billboard)	67
