= Feast or Famine =

Feast or Famine is an irreversible binomial that may refer to:

- Feast or Famine (Reef the Lost Cauze album), 2005
- Feast or Famine (Chuck Ragan album), 2007
