= Poupon =

Poupon may refer to:

- Grey Poupon, brand of Dijon mustard
- Gray Poupon (album), rap album by Doap Nixon

== People ==
- Emilie Poupon (1861–1944), potential identity of snake charmer Nala Damajanti
- Henri Poupon (1884–1953), French actor
- Philippe Poupon (born 1954), French professional offshore yachtsman
- Roger Poupon (1888–1976), French World War I flying ace
