= Viro the Virus =

American musician (1978–2012)

Calvin James Howard (October 4, 1978 – April 14, 2012), better known as Viro the Virus, was an underground hip hop artist based in New Jersey and Philadelphia. Despite only some commercial success, Viro became well known on the underground hip hop circuit, with his most notable appearance being on the track "Starlight" from the Snowgoons album Black Snow.

== Career ==
In his lifetime, Viro the Virus released seven albums, five of which were solo efforts. His debut, Future Trauma, was released in 2002 under the NODRECORDS. record label and has since been made available on iTunes. It would be three years until his next solo album, during which time he collaborated with producer Caliph-NOW on the album Arz Nova in 2003 and rapper Slim DSM on 420 in 2004. It was in 2005 that Viro released the album OutBreak spawning the popular track "Top Dog". Due to Viro's growing popularity in the later stages of his career, the album was re-released on iTunes in 2009. The entire album (save for the track "Primetime") was produced by Caliph-NOW.

2007 saw Jersey's Finest, Viro's third solo album. He described the album on the Philadelphia Weekly blogger as "my most upbeat album to date", a definite change from his previous, darker themes. The album also saw Viro collaborate with other well known underground rappers such as Philly locals Reef the Lost Cauze and Side Effect. In 2008, Viro released his fourth album, The Sharpest Blade. It was around this time that Viro performed on the Snowgoons track "Starlight" which garnered significant popularity, going viral and reaching over 300,000 views on YouTube. He would also appear on the tracks "The Limit" (from the 2009 Snowgoons album The Trojan Horse) and "All in Your Mind" from A Fist in the Thought, another 2009 release by the Snowgoons. Bud, Sex, and Beers, Vol. 1, released in 2009, would prove to be Viro's final album before his death in April 2012. The title of this final album implies that further albums under the Bud, Sex, and Beers moniker were planned. In 2011, the Snowgoons released Virohazard (Remix EP), which, as the title suggests, was a remix of many of Viro's most notable songs, including a remix of the song "Starlight".

Viro also produced the entrance theme for professional wrestler Chris Hero during his first stint with Ring of Honor, which, since its creation, became Hero's main entrance theme on independent wrestling shows.

== Fade into obscurity and death ==
Following the release of his 2009 album Bud, Sex, and Beers, Vol. 1, little was heard from Viro. Between 2009 and 2012, no new projects were announced. On April 15, 2012, Snowgoons posted an announcement of Viro's death on Twitter. His funeral was held at the New Jerusalem House of God church in Mount Holly, New Jersey.

== Legacy ==
Since Viro's passing, members of the hip hop community have paid their respects to him through their music. Not long after his death, MC Burke the Jurke recorded No Antidote, a two-minute track dedicated to Viro. In 2013, the Snowgoons, who previously worked with Viro on a number of occasions, placed the track "Rear Naked Choke" on their album Snowgoons Dynasty, originally a track from the EP Virohazard. Upon release of their latest album, Black Snow 2, they released the song "Dizzy Dreams" which is a remix of the song with the same name from 2003. There has also been confirmation that in April 2014, long-time producer and friend of Viro, Caliph-NOW, will be releasing a remixed version of the classic album Arz Nova, with the help of numerous guest producers.

== Discography ==
=== Studio releases ===
- Future Trauma (2002)
- Arz Nova: The Longest EP Ever (with Caliph-NOW) (2003)
- 420 (with Slim DSM & Caliph-NOW) (2004)
- OutBreak (2005)
- Jersey's Finest (2006)
- The Sharpest Blade (2008)
- Bud, Sex and Beers, Vol. 1 EP (2009)
- From Jersey To Germany (with Snowgoons) (2019)

=== Remix releases ===
- Virohazard (Remix EP) (2011)
- Arz Nova: The Longest EP Ever Remixed (2014)
- 420 Remixed (with Slim DSM) (2015)
- Outbreak Remixed (2016)
- Jersey's Finest Remixed (2017)
- The Sharpest Blade Remixed (2018)

=== As featured performer ===
- "Starlight" - Snowgoons Ft. Viro the Virus (2008)
- "Lonely Streets" - Reef The Lost Cauze Ft. Viro the Virus (2008)
- "The Limit" - Snowgoons Ft. Viro the Virus (2009)
- "All in Your Mind" - Snowgoons Ft. Viro the Virus (2009)
- "Chris is Awesome" - Viro the Virus (2009)
- "The World" - The White Shadow Of Norway Ft. Viro the Virus, Sha Stimuli & Awkword (2011)
- "Rear Naked Choke" - Snowgoons Ft. Viro the Virus (2012)
- "Dizzy Dreams" - Snowgoons Ft. Viro the Virus (2013)
- "Problem" - DJ Artz Ft. Viro the Virus (2017)
