= J. Griffen Greene =

American educator

- Born: 1910; Montezuma, Georgia, U.S.
- Died: 1987
- Occupation: Educator
- Organization(s): Alpha Phi Alpha; Mason
- Parent(s): Griffen and Rosie Greene
- Relatives: Vivian Greene-Gantzberg (daughter); Chuck Wilson (multimedia executive)(grandson)

J. Griffen Greene (1910–1987) was an American educator.

== Biography ==
=== Early life and family ===
Greene was born in 1910 in Montezuma, Georgia. At the age of 12, he lost his right arm at the elbow.

Greene graduated from Paine College, Augusta. He received his bachelor of arts degree from Knoxville College, 1993 and master of education from Atlanta University, 1946. He also studied at the University of Michigan, University of Florida Atlantic University. He served as high school principal at Statesboro High and Industrial School and in Florida as a supervising principal of St. Lucie County Schools.

He married Gladys Moore Greene, a librarian and graduate student at the University of Michigan, who died in 2013. Their daughter Rose Greene was one the first seven Black students permitted to enroll at The University of Florida in 1962 and their other daughter Vivian Greene-Gantzberg was a professor at University of Michigan, Harvard and University of Maryland. Greene was the first President of Daytona State College.

=== Career ===
During his career, Griffen served as a principal Lincoln Academy High School at Fort Pierce, Florida.

In 1958, Greene was appointed president of Volusia County Junior College, one of 12 public junior colleges established in Florida for African-Americans, majority of which were established between 1957 and 1962 under the initiative started by Governor LeRoy Collins. By 1964, the college had served 5,600 students during his administration. In 1965, the college amalgamated with Daytona State College, making him the first and only president of Volusia County Junior College prior to its merger. After the merger, he served as dean at Daytona State College before leaving in 1973. Greene later became an English and education professor at Bethune-Cookman College, working between 1973 and 1976. He died after he retired.

He was a member of Stewart Memorial United Methodist Church, Daytona Beach, Alpha Phi Alpha and a Mason.

== History ==
Greene’s grandfather, Amos Greene, was a slave in Greene County, GA on a plantation owned by Lemuel Daniel Greene, Sr., a descendant of Thomas “The Seagull” Green, Sr. who emigrated aboard the ship Speedwell and settled near the city of Petersburg, VA.

== Awards and recognition ==
In 2001, Greene was recognized by Governor LeRoy Collins as a “Great Floridian” as a part of the Governor’s Great Floridians 2000 program administered by the Florida Department of State.

In 2021, Daytona State College formally re-dedicated the J. Griffen Greene Center on the Daytona Beach Campus. The ceremony took place outside in front of the building bearing his name. The event included the unveiling of a new timeline mural that will be permanently displayed inside the Greene Center, highlighting his legacy
