= The Talented Timothy Taylor =

Studio album by Wise Intelligent
- Released: July 17, 2007
- Genre: Hip hop
- Length: 70:07
- Label: Shaman Work
- Producer: Paul "P.J." Little Jr., Masada, Oh No, Tizzo, Ammbush

Wise Intelligent chronology
Killin' U... for Fun (1996)	The Talented Timothy Taylor (2007)	The Unconkable Djezuz Djonez (2011)

Professional ratings
Review scores
Source	Rating
AllMusic	3.5/5 stars
City Pages	favorable
HipHopDX	3/5 stars

The Talented Timothy Taylor is a studio album by American rapper Wise Intelligent. It was released on Shaman Work in 2007.

== Reception ==
Stewart Mason of AllMusic gave the album 3.5 stars out of 5, saying, "Wise Intelligent uses modern-day production styles and his own, undiminished, old-school flow to create a rapprochement between hip-hop's present and past, and the combination works perfectly." Jordan Selbo of City Pages called it "one of the hottest releases this summer."

It ranked at number 45 on PopMatters' "101 Hip-Hop Albums of 2007" list.

== Track listing ==
No.	Title	Producer(s)	Length
1.	"Another Chance @ Life"	Paul "P.J." Little Jr.	4:45
2.	"I'm Him"	Masada	3:36
3.	"Skit"		0:32
4.	"Sensi Party" (featuring Somer Lane)	Masada	3:14
5.	"Skit"		0:35
6.	"Go with Me"	Oh No	3:22
7.	"Youth & Thugs" (featuring Popula)	Masada	5:22
8.	"Interlude"		0:36
9.	"A Genocide"	Paul "P.J." Little Jr.	4:09
10.	"Skit"		0:26
11.	"Ganja Smugglin"	Paul "P.J." Little Jr.	3:42
12.	"Skit"		0:48
13.	"Police Can Do"	Tizzo	3:45
14.	"Skit"		0:09
15.	"Passing tha Time"	Masada	4:28
16.	"Still Black"	Oh No	4:22
17.	"Mama Cry"	Ammbush	4:32
18.	"Summer in da Jects"	Masada	3:53
19.	"Barnes & Noble (+ Lesson)"		1:47
20.	"This Is Love" (featuring Tye Austin)	Masada	5:17
21.	"Intelligent Wise"	Ammbush	3:29
22.	"Set U Free"	Oh No	3:48
23.	"Cold World"	Paul "P.J." Little Jr.	3:30
