= Vivian Greene-Gantzberg =

American educator (1948–1998)

- Born: Vivian Yvonne Mitchell Greene; Georgia, United States
- Education: Spelman College and University of Illinois
- Occupations: Professor and Author
- Organization: Alpha Kappa Alpha
- Parent(s): J. Griffen Greene and Gladys Moore Greene
- Relatives: Chuck Wilson (multimedia executive)(Nephew)

Vivian Yvonne Mitchell Greene-Gantzberg (February 22, 1948 – July 2, 1998) was an American educator and author with an expertise in 18th and 19th century Danish and German literature.

== Early life and education ==
Greene-Gantzberg was born in Georgia. She graduated from Spelman College in Atlanta in 1970 and received her masters and doctoral degrees in German from the University of Illinois.

== Career ==
She was a faculty member at the University of Michigan from 1976 until 1982, a visiting professor at Harvard University from 1994 until 1995, and an associate professor at the University of Maryland where she was a Fulbright Scholar and taught Germanic languages and literature.

Monica Susana Hidalgo mentions in "Literary Impressionism and the Case of Herman Bang", that Vivian Griffen Greene's "Herman Bang og det fremmede", describes the parallels between Herman Bang's "Les quatre Diables" and Edmund de Goncourt's 1879 "Les Frères Zemganno".

Greene-Gantzberg published "Ludvig Holberg and German-Speaking Europe," in Ludvig Holberg: A European Writer, edited by Sven Hakon Rossel (1994).

== Selected publications ==
- Gantzberg, Vivian Greene (1997). Biography of Danish Literary Impressionist Herman Bang (1857–1912). E. Mellen Press. ISBN 9780889467828.
- Bang, Herman (1990). Gantzberg, Vivian Greene (ed.). Udenrigspolitisk journalistik. Gyldendalske Boghandel. ISBN 9788700668546.
- Gantzberg, Vivian Greene (1992). Herman Bang og det fremmede. Gyldendal. ISBN 9788701740647.
- Gantzberg, Vivian Greene (2005). "Booker T. Washington's European Encounter". In Cunnigen, Donald; Gonza Glascoe, Myrtle; Dennis, Rutledge M. (eds.). Racial Politics of Booker T. Washington. Emerald Group Publishing. ISBN 978-0-7623-1011-1.

== Personal life ==
Her marriage to Arthur R. Gantzberg ended in divorce. Greene-Gantzberg died of brain cancer in 1998. She became a member of Alpha Kappa Alpha sorority while an undergraduate student at Spelman College
