= Gray Poupon (album) =

Studio album by Doap Nixon
- Released: February 28, 2011
- Recorded: 2009–2011
- Genre: Hip hop
- Label: Q-Demented
- Producer: C-Lance; DC the Midi Alien; DJ Kwestion; Hutch; Illbred; Level 707; Many Beats; Pokerbeats; Rhythmatik; Stu Bangas; Hitfarmers

Doap Nixon chronology
Sour Diesel (2008)	Gray Poupon (2011)	Doap Traffiking: The Rise and Fall of Darth Nixon (2011)

Professional ratings
Review scores
Source	Rating
HipHopDX	3.5/5
RapReviews	7/10

Gray Poupon is the second solo studio album by American rapper Doap Nixon. It was officially released on February 28, 2011 on iTunes via Q-Demented. Production was handled by C-Lance, DC the Midi Alien, DJ Kwestion, Hutch, Illbred, Level 707, Many Beats, Rhythmatik, Pokerbeats, Stu Bangas and Hitfarmers. It features guest appearances from Block McCloud, Burke The Jurke, Capo, Celph Titled, Crypt The Warchild, DJ Kwestion, Journalist, Killer Rellik, Planetary, Sick Six and Chief Kamachi.

The album is named after the French brand of mustard Grey Poupon.

== Background ==
Early 2011, Doap Nixon stepped forward with his sophomore album; Gray Poupon. It was known for Doap Nixon asserting his voice and perspective, outside of his lyrical cartel. Doap Nixon raps about his catalog, listing credits and collaborations, and compares them against other emcees ascending into the public eye.

== Track listing ==
No.	Title	Producer(s)	Length
1.	"Intro"	Hutch	1:35
2.	"Silent Murders"	DJ Kwestion	3:30
3.	"Grand Opening" (featuring Celph Titled and Planetary)	D.C. The Midi Alien	4:18
4.	"Afraid of Me" (featuring Block McCloud)	Many Beats	3:32
5.	"Jive Turkey's"	PokerBeats	3:52
6.	"Darkness"	C-Lance	3:44
7.	"About Me" (featuring Journalist)	Level 707	3:41
8.	"Words From Kwestion" (featuring DJ Kwestion)	Rythmatik	1:26
9.	"War Music" (featuring Crypt the Warchild)	Illbred	3:39
10.	"Power to the People"	Pokerbeats	4:30
11.	"You Need to Know"	Rythmatik	1:51
12.	"Caucasion SlimeWave" (featuring Killa Rellik, Sick Six, Capo and Burke the Jurke)	Stu Bangas	4:39
13.	"Burnt Offering"	Illbred	3:09
14.	"Running (Bonus Track)" (featuring Chief Kamachi)	Many Beats	3:42
15.	"Pistol Gang" (Bonus Track)	Hitfarmers	3:05
