= Heavy Lies the Crown (album) =

Studio album by Army of the Pharaohs
- Released: October 21, 2014
- Recorded: 2012–2014
- Genre: Hardcore hip-hop
- Length: 55:47
- Label: Enemy Soil
- Producer: 7L; C-Lance; Beatnick Dee; DJ Skizz; Frank Dukes; Juan Muteniac; Kevin Lavitt; MTK; Nero; Shuko; Spada4; Stu Bangas; Twiz the Beat Pro

Army of the Pharaohs chronology
In Death Reborn (2014)	Heavy Lies the Crown (2014)

Rear cover

Singles from Heavy Lies the Crown
- 1. "Terrorstorm" Released: October 7, 2014

Professional ratings
Review scores
Source	Rating
AllMusic	4/5 stars

Heavy Lies the Crown is the fifth studio album by American hardcore hip-hop collective Army of the Pharaohs. It was released on October 21, 2014, through Enemy Soil Records, making it the group's third and final album for the label.

Production was handled by C-Lance, 7L, Beatnick Dee, DJ Skizz, Frank Dukes, Juan Muteniac, Kevin Lavitt, MTK, Nero, Shuko, Spada4, Stu Bangas and Twiz the Beat Pro.

The album debuted at number 142 on the Billboard 200, number 27 on the Top R&B/Hip-Hop Albums, number 14 on the Top Rap Albums and number 25 on the Independent Albums charts in the United States, and number 35 on the Official Hip Hop and R&B Albums Chart in the United Kingdom.

== Background ==
On August 6, 2014, it was announced that Heavy Lies the Crown, initially set for a November 2014 release, would be released six months after the group's previous album, In Death Reborn. New AOTP member Lawrence Arnell contributed to two songs after being featured on one track from its predecessor. King Magnetic was the only member from the previous album not to make the final cut.

== Track listing ==
No.	Title	Writer(s)	Producer(s)	Length
1.	"War Machine"	Vincenzo Luvineri; Sharif Lacey; Marcus Albaladejo; Vic Mercer; Seamus Ryan; Chad Bromley; Adam Feeney	Frank Dukes	4:30
2.	"Blood Storm"	M. Albaladejo; Mario Collazo; Mercer; David Edens; F. Bruno	Nero	3:44
3.	"The Tempter and the Bible Black"	Luvineri; Collazo; Ryan; Bromley; Mercer; Stuart Hudgins	Stu Bangas	3:38
4.	"Serpent King"	Ira Osu; Mercer; M. Albaladejo; Collazo; Victor Gurrola, Jr.; Craig Lanciani	C-Lance	3:12
5.	"The King's Curse"	Luvineri; Mercer; Collazo; Bromley; Ryan; George Andrinopoulos	DJ 7L	3:24
6.	"Terrorstorm"	Luvineri; Mercer; Ismael Diaz; Lacey; Ryan; M. Albaladejo; Bromley; Lanciani	C-Lance	5:03
7.	"Conjure the Legions"	Ryan; Collazo; Bromley; Luvineri; M. Albaladejo; Mercer; Lacey; Daniel Albaladejo; Lawrence MacMillan; Lanciani	C-Lance	5:20
8.	"Fed to the Lions"	Luvineri; Lacey; Collazo; Bromley; Ryan; Mercer; Timothy McRae	Twiz The Beat Pro	4:09
9.	"Sword and Bullet"	Kenneth Greene; M. Albaladejo; Jose Vargas; Luvineri; Christoph Bauss	Shuko	3:44
10.	"Wrath Prophecy"	Gurrola, Jr.; Collazo; Greene; Mercer; Nick Doherty	Beatnick Dee	3:18
11.	"Conversation with a Bullet"	Gurrola, Jr.; Mercer; Collazo; Luvineri; Juho Mutenia	Juan Muteniac	4:18
12.	"The Hate and the Blame"	Bromley; Ryan; MacMillan; Luvineri; M. Albaladejo; Todd Spadafore	Spada4	3:55
13.	"Becoming the Absolute"	M. Albaladejo; Bromley; Gurrola, Jr.; Luvineri; Zach Raemer	DJ Skizz	3:30
14.	"The Quickening"	Collazo; Ryan; D. Albaladejo; Osu; Matthew Crabtree; Kevin Lavitt	MTK; Kevin Lavitt	4:02
Total length:				55:47

== Personnel ==
- Vincenzo "Vinnie Paz" Luvineri – vocals (tracks: 1, 3, 5–9, 11–13)
- Sharif "Reef the Lost Cauze" Lacey – vocals (tracks: 1, 6–8)
- Marcus "Crypt the Warchild" Albaladejo – vocals (tracks: 1, 2, 4, 6, 7, 9, 12, 13)
- Vic "Celph Titled" Mercer – vocals (tracks: 1–8, 10, 11)
- Seamus "Esoteric" Ryan – vocals (tracks: 1, 3, 5–8, 12, 14)
- Chad "Apathy" Bromley – vocals (tracks: 1, 3, 5–8, 12, 13)
- Mario "Planetary" Collazo – vocals (tracks: 2–5, 7, 8, 10, 11, 14)
- David "Des Devious" Edens – vocals (track 2)
- Ira "Blacastan" Osu – vocals (tracks: 4, 12)
- Victor "Zilla" Gurrola Jr. – vocals (tracks: 4, 10, 11, 13)
- Ismael "Block McCloud" Diaz Jr. – vocals (track 6)
- Daniel "King Syze" Albaladejo – vocals (tracks: 7, 14)
- Lawrence Arnell – vocals (tracks: 7, 12)
- Kenneth "Doap Nixon" Greene – vocals (tracks: 9, 10)
- Jose "Demoz" Vargas – vocals (track 9)
- Dave "DJ Kwestion" Klein – scratches (tracks: 3, 11)
- Adam "Frank Dukes" Feeney – producer (track 1)
- F. "Nero" Bruno – producer (track 2)
- Stuart "Stu Bangas" Hudgins – producer (track 3)
- Craig "C-Lance" Lanciani – producer (tracks: 4, 6, 7)
- George "7L" Andrinopoulos – producer (track 5)
- Timothy "Twiz The Beat Pro" McRae – producer (track 8)
- Christoph "Shuko" Bauss – producer (track 9)
- Nick "Beatnick Dee" Doherty – producer (track 10)
- Juho "Juan Muteniac" Mutenia – producer (track 11)
- Todd Spadafore – producer (track 12)
- Zach "DJ Skizz" Raemer – producer (track 13)
- Matthew "MTK" Crabtree – producer (track 14)
- Kevin Lavitt – producer (track 14)
- Scott "Supe" Stallone – engineering, mixing
- Peter Humphreys – mastering
- Dan Bradley – design, photography

== Charts ==
Chart (2014)	Peak position
UK R&B Albums (OCC)	35
US Billboard 200	142
US Top R&B/Hip-Hop Albums (Billboard)	27
US Top Rap Albums (Billboard)	14
US Independent Albums (Billboard)	25
