= A Vicious Cycle =

Studio album by Reef the Lost Cauze
- Released: November 10, 2008
- Studios: The Hot Box (Philadelphia, PA); The Dojo (Brooklyn, NY); Heaven's Basement (Easton, PA); Chop Shop Studio (Langhorne, PA); The Krib; Yaddi Box Studios
- Genre: Hip-hop
- Labels: Fuck You Pay Me Records; Well Done Entertainment
- Producers: Brods; Eyego/Direct; Marco Polo; MTK; Stress The White Boy; The Beatills; The Unknown Soldier

Reef the Lost Cauze chronology
Feast or Famine (2005)	A Vicious Cycle (2008)	High Life 2013 (2013)

Professional ratings
Review scores
Source	Rating
HipHopDX	3.5/5
RapReviews	7.5/10

A Vicious Cycle is the fourth solo studio album by American rapper Reef the Lost Cauze. It was released on November 10, 2008, via Fuck You Pay Me Records and Well Done Entertainment. Recording sessions took place at The Hot Box in Philadelphia, The Dojo in Brooklyn, Heaven's Basement in Easton, Chop Shop Studio in Langhorne, The Krib and Yaddi Box Studios. Production was handled by Brods, Eyego/Direct, Marco Polo, MTK, Stress The White Boy, The Beatills and The Unknown Soldier. It features guest appearances from Eternia, Ethel Cee, King Magnetic, Scandal, Taragirl, Termanology and Will Guice.

It was re-released on February 10, 2009, with two new remixes of the tracks "Listen to Me" and "Get It? Got It? Good" done by J.J. Brown.

== Track listing ==
No.	Title	Writer(s)	Producer(s)	Length
1.	"Back at It"	Sharif Lacey; Jake Eigo; Josh Eigo	Eyego/Direct	3:21
2.	"Pay-Per-View"	Lacey; Kent Hertzog	The Beatills	3:21
3.	"Problem"	Lacey; Jeff Davis	Stress The White Boy	3:52
4.	"I Wonder"	Lacey; Marco Bruno	Marco Polo	4:47
5.	"Thug Fantasy"	Lacey; Eigo; Eigo	Eyego/Direct	4:33
6.	"I Ain't No Rapper"	Lacey; Jørgen Sæther Brodshaug	Brods	4:00
7.	"Big Deal"	Lacey; Eigo; Eigo	Eyego/Direct	4:03
8.	"Not That Easy" (featuring Ethel Cee)	Lacey; Kamilah Clark; Eigo; Eigo	Eyego/Direct	2:48
9.	"Listen to Me"	Lacey; Eigo; Eigo	Eyego/Direct	3:33
10.	"Get It? Got It? Good"	Lacey; Matthew Crabtree	MTK	4:08
11.	"Upside Down" (featuring Scandal and Eternia)	Lacey; Anwar Morgan; Silk Kaya; Eigo; Eigo	Eyego/Direct	3:35
12.	"Gone" (featuring King Magnetic and Termanology)	Lacey; Jason Faust; Daniel Carrillo; Davis	Stress The White Boy	3:54
13.	"Amnesia"	Lacey; Eigo; Eigo	The Beatills	3:15
14.	"Nat Turner"	Lacey; The Unknown Soldier	The Unknown Soldier	4:12
15.	"Bad Lieutenant"	Lacey; Eigo; Eigo	Eyego/Direct	3:37
16.	"When You Get Free" (featuring Will Guice)	Lacey; Will Guice; Davis	Stress The White Boy	5:26
17.	"Home"	Lacey; Crabtree	MTK	3:14
18.	"Still I Rise" (featuring Taragirl)	Lacey; Tara Betterbid; Eigo; Eigo	Eyego/Direct	3:03

No.	Title	Length
19.	"Listen To Me (J.J. Brown Remix)"
20.	"Get It? Got It? Good (J.J. Brown Remix)"

== Personnel ==
- Sharif "Reef the Lost Cauze" Lacey – vocals, executive producer, sleeve notes
- Kamilah "Ethel Cee" Clark – vocals (track 8)
- Anwar "Scandal" Morgan – vocals (track 11)
- Silk "Eternia" Kaya – vocals (track 11)
- Jason "King Magnetic" Faust – vocals (track 12)
- Daniel "Termanology" Carrillo – vocals (track 12)
- Will Guice – vocals (track 16)
- Tara "Taragirl" Betterbid – vocals (track 18)
- Jake Eigo – producer (tracks: 1, 5, 7–9, 11, 15, 18), recording (tracks: 1, 2, 5, 6, 9–13, 15, 18)
- Josh Eigo – producer (tracks: 1, 5, 7–9, 11, 15, 18), recording (tracks: 1, 2, 5, 6, 9–13, 15, 18)
- The Beatills – producers (tracks: 2, 13)
- Jeff "Stress" Davis – producer (tracks: 3, 12, 16), recording (tracks: 3, 8, 14, 16, 17), mixing (tracks: 3, 7, 8, 14, 16, 17)
- Marco "Marco Polo" Bruno – producer & recording (track 4)
- Jørgen Sæther "Brods" Brodshaug – producer (track 6)
- Matthew "MTK" Crabtree – producer (tracks: 10, 17)
- The Unknown Soldier – producer (track 14)
- Stephen "Zilla Rocca" Zales – recording (track 7)
- Nonezeo – recording (track 11)
- Byron "Ali Armz" McIntosh – recording (track 12)
- Scott "Supe" Stallone – mixing (tracks: 1, 5, 6, 9–12, 15, 18)
- DJ Luciano – mixing (tracks: 2, 13)
- Joe Nardone – mixing (track 4)
- Peter Humphreys – mastering
- Luis Valbuena – executive producer, sleeve notes, management
- Mike Scott Whitson – photography
- Jason "J.J." Brown – re-mixing (tracks: 19, 20)
- Dan "The Deacon" Maier – co-producer & mixing (tracks: 19, 20)
