= High Life 2013 =

Studio album by Reef the Lost Cauze
- Released: December 17, 2013
- Recorded: 2000–2001, 2012–2013
- Genre: Hip-hop
- Labels: Well Done Entertainment; Fuck You Pay Me Records

Reef the Lost Cauze chronology
A Vicious Cycle (2008)	High Life 2013 (2013)

High Life 2013 is the fifth studio album by Philadelphia underground hip-hop artist Reef the Lost Cauze released on December 17, 2013. It is the re-release as well as the sequel of his debut album The High Life.

== Track listing ==
No.	Title	Length
1.	"Intro/30 Seconds"	5:37
2.	"Sound the Horns"	3:32
3.	"Bitter" (featuring Sleep E)	4:53
4.	"Youse A Bird"	5:00
5.	"Impregnable"	5:24
6.	"The Shining"	3:03
7.	"Entering a Break in" (featuring Sleep E & K Sirah)	5:20
8.	"So Much Stress" (featuring Ha Skeem)	7:31
9.	"Wicked Karma"	5:04
10.	"Who Me?" (featuring Sleep E & B at Ease)	4:53
11.	"Ball Buster"	5:04
12.	"Blow the Whistle"	4:57
13.	"Crush"	4:26
14.	"Pressure"	5:01
15.	"This Is My Life" (Original Recording)	5:50
16.	"Da Cauze" (Original Recording)	3:41
17.	"Keep Feeding You"	3:09
18.	"It's Been a Long Time"	3:54
19.	"Weekend Theme" (featuring B at Ease & Dma)	5:54
