= Invisible Empire (album) =

Studio album by Reef the Lost Cauze
- Released: January 1, 2003
- Genre: Hip-hop
- Label: Gladiator Films Records
- Producers: Bo Bliz; Emynd; Eyego Direct

Reef the Lost Cauze chronology
The High Life (2000)	Invisible Empire (2003)	Feast or Famine (2005)

Invisible Empire is the second studio album from Philadelphia hip-hop artist Reef the Lost Cauze. The album was put out on Gladiator Films Records by executive producers Alex Corr and Wiley.

== Track listing ==
#	Title	Producer(s)	Performer(s)
1	"Intro (In the Caddy)"		Reef the Lost Cauze
2	"This Is My Life"	Emynd	Reef the Lost Cauze
3	"Gladiator"	Emynd	Reef the Lost Cauze
4	"Follow The Drum"	Eyego Direct	Reef the Lost Cauze, Annette Koleda
5	"Deadly Combo"		Reef the Lost Cauze
6	"The Puzzle"	Emynd	Reef the Lost Cauze
7	"Calm Your Mind"		Reef the Lost Cauze
8	"Spanish Geetar"		Reef the Lost Cauze
9	"Give Up His Name"		Reef the Lost Cauze, Diverse
10	"Monday (Fuck This Job)"	Emynd	Reef the Lost Cauze, Annette Koleda
11	"Oxygen (Breathe)"		Reef the Lost Cauze
12	"I Can't Begin"	Eyego Direct	Reef the Lost Cauze
13	"Bananas"		Reef the Lost Cauze
14	"No One But You"		Reef the Lost Cauze
15	"So Gangsta (Old Skool Anthem)"		Reef the Lost Cauze
16	"The Cauze"		Reef the Lost Cauze
17	"Angels Sing"	Eyego Direct	Reef the Lost Cauze
18	"Outro (In the Caddy)"		Reef the Lost Cauze
