= Your Favorite MC =

Studio album by Reef the Lost Cauze and Snowgoons
- Released: October 25, 2011
- Studio: At Large Studios (Karlsruhe, (Germany) ); Treat Street Studios (Philadelphia, PA, (United States) ); Sicknature's Crib (Copenhagen, (Denmark) )
- Genre: Hip-hop
- Label: Goon MuSick; iHipHop
- Producer: Snowgoons

Reef the Lost Cauze chronology
Fight Music (2010)	Your Favorite MC (2011)	The Fast Way (2014)

Snowgoons chronology
Kraftwerk (2010)	Your Favorite MC (2011)	Sparta (2011)

Professional ratings
Review scores
Source	Rating
RapReviews	7/10

Your Favorite MC is a collaborative studio album by American rapper Reef the Lost Cauze and German hip-hop production team Snowgoons. It was released on October 25, 2011 via Goon MuSick/iHipHop Distribution. Recording sessions took place at AtLarge Studios in Karlsruhe, Treat Street Studios in Philadelphia, and Sicknature's Crib in Copenhagen. The album features guest appearances from Esoteric, F.T., J.O. the Last Man, Jus Allah, King Magnetic, OuterSpace, Sabac Red, Slaine and Wise Intelligent.

== Track listing ==
No.	Title	Writer(s)	Length
1.	"Brotherhood"	Sharif Lacey	2:45
2.	"Fuck Rappers"	Lacey	4:12
3.	"Euthanasia" (featuring Jus Allah)	Lacey; James Bostick; Jeppe Andersen	4:14
4.	"Timezones" (featuring OuterSpace)	Lacey; Mario Collazo; Marcus Albaladejo	4:03
5.	"Kill Somebody"	Lacey	3:33
6.	"Boxcutter Samurai"	Lacey	4:14
7.	"Black Opz"	Lacey	4:27
8.	"Brain on Drugs" (featuring Esoteric)	Lacey; Seamus Ryan	3:20
9.	"High By Myself"	Lacey	3:29
10.	"Devil's Advocate"	Lacey	4:02
11.	"The Legend of Mr. T"	Lacey	2:36
12.	"Mount Up" (featuring Sabac Red and Wise Intelligent)	Lacey; John Fuentes; Timothy Grimes	3:33
13.	"Big Shots" (featuring J.O. and King Magnetic)	Lacey; Joshua Hemingway; Jason Faust	3:56
14.	"1000 Rhyme Books"	Lacey	3:19
15.	"Fuck Rappers Remix" (featuring Slaine and F.T.)	Lacey; George Carroll; Winston Morris	5:35
