= Feast or Famine (Reef the Lost Cauze album) =

Studio album by Reef the Lost Cauze
- Released: September 20, 2005
- Studios: The 3rd Floor; The Muthafuckin' Spot On Lexington
- Genre: Hip-hop
- Length: 1:07:48
- Labels: Good Hands; Eastern Conference
- Producers: DJ Huggy; DJ Mighty Mi; E. Dan; Emynd; Eyego/Direct; King Magnetic; Snuff

Reef the Lost Cauze chronology
Invisible Empire (2003)	Feast or Famine (2005)	A Vicious Cycle (2008)

Professional ratings
Review scores
Source	Rating
AllMusic	3/5 stars
RapReviews	7.5/10

Feast or Famine is the third studio album by American rapper Reef the Lost Cauze. It was released on September 20, 2005, via Good Hands Records and Eastern Conference Records. Recording sessions took place at The 3rd Floor and The Muthafuckin' Spot On Lexington. Production was handled by Eyego/Direct, DJ Huggy, E. Dan, Emynd, DJ Mighty Mi, King Magnetic and Snuff. It features guest appearances from King Magnetic, Sean Price, and the JuJu Mob members Charon Don, Chief Kamachi and State Store.

In 2007 the album was reissued as Feast Or Famine 2.0 with two bonus tracks: "Nat Turner" and "You Don't Own Me".

== Track listing ==
No.	Title	Writer(s)	Producer(s)	Length
1.	"Humble Beginnings"	Sharif Lacey; Emil Nassar	Emynd	3:50
2.	"Sound of Philadelphia"	Lacey; Jason Faust	King Magnetic	3:37
3.	"Commander in Chief"	Lacey; Chris Bancroft	Snuff	3:56
4.	"How You Lose Your Mind"	Lacey; Jake Eigo; Josh Eigo	Eyego/Direct	4:31
5.	"Crown of Thorns"	Lacey; Jaron Lamot; Eric Allan Dan	DJ Huggy; E. Dan	5:35
6.	"Give It Up"	Lacey; Eigo; Eigo	Eyego/Direct	4:10
7.	"Fair One" (featuring Sean Price)	Lacey; Sean Price; Milo Berger	DJ Mighty Mi	4:27
8.	"I'm Rich" (featuring Charon Don)	Lacey; Charon White; Lamot; Dan	DJ Huggy; E. Dan	4:40
9.	"Main Event"	Lacey; Nassar	Emynd	3:19
10.	"Coltrane" (featuring Statestore)	Lacey; Bobby Walker; Eigo; Eigo	Eyego/Direct	3:39
11.	"Already Dead" (featuring Chief Kamachi)	Lacey; Edward Littlepage; Lamot; Dan	DJ Huggy; E. Dan	3:53
12.	"Look at the Sun"	Lacey; Nassar	Emynd	4:05
13.	"Two Guns Up"	Lacey; Eigo; Eigo	Eyego/Direct	3:35
14.	"Crumbs" (featuring King Magnetic)	Lacey; Faust; Eigo; Eigo	Eyego/Direct	3:23
15.	"Eyes of My Father"	Lacey; Eigo; Eigo	Eyego/Direct	4:58
16.	"Live as It Gets"	Lacey; Eigo; Eigo	Eyego/Direct	6:10
17.	"Commander in Chief" (Video)
Total length:				1:07:48

Feast Or Famine 2.0 bonus tracks
No.	Title	Length
17.	"Nat Turner"	3:33
18.	"You Don't Own Me"	3:19

== Personnel ==
- Sharif "Reef the Lost Cauze" Lacey – vocals, executive producer, sleeve notes
- Sean Price – vocals (track 7)
- Charon "Charon Don" White – vocals (track 8)
- Bobby "Statestore" Walker – vocals (track 10)
- Edward "Chief Kamachi" Littlepage – vocals (track 11)
- Jason "King Magnetic" Faust – vocals (track 14), producer (track 2)
- Emil "Emynd" Nassar – producer (tracks: 1, 9, 12)
- Chris "Snuff" Bancroft – producer (track 3)
- Jake Eigo – scratches (track 16), producer (tracks: 4, 6, 10, 13–16)
- Josh Eigo – scratches (track 16), producer (tracks: 4, 6, 10, 13–16)
- Eric Dan – producer (tracks: 5, 8, 11), mixing (tracks: 1–3, 5, 7–9, 11, 12)
- Jaron "DJ Huggy" Lamot – producer (tracks: 5, 8, 11)
- Milo "DJ Mighty Mi" Berger – producer & recording (track 7)
- Art Beeswax – recording (tracks: 1–6, 8–16), executive producer, sleeve notes
- Charley "DJ Truth" Greenberg – recording (tracks: 1–6, 8–16), executive producer, sleeve notes
- Scott "Supe" Stallone – mixing (tracks: 4, 6, 10, 13, 14, 16)
- Peter Humphreys – mastering
- Kevin Devine – layout
- Mike Yamrus – director of photography (video)
- Brian Guerin – film producer, production assistant (video)
- Brian McGillin – film producer, production assistant (video)
- Frank Guerin – film producer, production assistant (video)
- Jeremy Eccard – film producer, film director, associate producer/director (video)
- James McGillin – film producer, film director, image editor, design editor (video)
