= Good Money =

Neobank

- Company type: Private company / Cooperative
- Industry: Financial technology, financial services
- Founded: 2018; 8 years ago
- Headquarters: San Francisco, United States
- Area served: United States
- Key people: Gunnar Lovelace, founder
- Products: Checking account and high-yield savings accounts
- Website: www.goodmoney.com

Good Money is an American digital online banking platform, founded by Gunnar Lovelace. As a digital platform, Good Money takes no ATM or overdraft fees. It is considered a neobank and is based in San Francisco.

== History ==
Good Money was founded in 2018. Gunnar Lovelace was founder of organic e-commerce company Thrive Market, a direct-to-consumer online grocery store. In December 2018, Good Money announced that it had raised $30 million with a group of investors including Galaxy Digital, Breyer Capital, Mitch Kapor, and Ken Howery.

In January 2019, customers started joining a waitlist to start their accounts. Every customer will potentially get equity in the company when opening an account and can build up that equity by using the service.

== Operations ==
The company offers FDIC-insured checking and high-yield savings accounts. When account holders sign up, they are offered a stake in the bank, making it the first digital banking platform that will be owned by its customers. Customers can receive additional equity by installing the Good Money app, setting up a direct deposit, or referring friends.

Good Money directs 50% of its profits toward environmental and social justice initiatives through impact investments and charitable donations. The platform's customers vote on where Good Money will invest profits, but their options only include sustainable investments.
