= Chuck Wilson (multimedia executive) =

American entrepreneur (born 1968)

- Born: April 23, 1968 (age 58)
- Education: University of Virginia (BA/JD/MBA)
- Occupation: Entrepreneur
- Organizations: Kappa Alpha Psi (Life Member)
- Children: 2
- Relatives: J. Griffen Greene (Grandfather); Vivian Greene-Gantzberg (Aunt)
- Honors: 1990 Lawn Resident. Selected by fellow students at the University of Virginia

Charles "Chuck" Lee Wilson Jr. (born April 23, 1968) is an American entrepreneur. He is currently the Chief Executive Officer of Babygrande Global, an American investment company based in New York. Babygrande Global currently has holdings in the music, golf, craft beer, film, technology and supercar industries.

== Career ==
=== Film ===
Wilson broke into the film industry as an intern for Spike Lee on the set of 1994's Crooklyn. Wilson sold his first script to Danny DeVito in 1999. The film was about wealthy African Americans in the Hamptons, which Wilson said was akin to "a black Great Gatsby". The same year, Wu-Tang International optioned his music-based urban drama Trife Life and Jersey Films purchased his untitled urban comedy pitch, centered on golf. Trife Life was set to star Mos Def, but never came to fruition. He went on to write and direct the short film, Breakfast At Ben's which was also a part of his deal with Wu-Tang International. Wilson was granted rare access to shoot the film in the historic Washington, D.C. restaurant Ben's Chili Bowl where his father used to take him to eat as a child. Breakfast At Ben's appeared on Warner Brothers's compilation, Afrocentricity and premiered at the 2000 Urbanworld Film Festival. It also appeared in the DC Independent Film Festival as well as the Maryland Film Festival. Wilson went on to co-write the film, Soul Plane which was described by Variety magazine as a next generation Airplane!. Soul Plane came under fire from several members of the black community including Spike Lee who accused the film of being exploitative of African Americans. In 2004, he was slated to write "a black wedding comedy" titled, Meet The Mo'Fockers, parodying such films as Meet The Parents and The Wedding Singer. The film was part of a deal with Maverick Films company, then owned by Madonna. Despite its comedic nature, the film was also set to examine class differences within the black community. Wilson has also collaborated with RZA on a screenplay entitle "Black Shampoo" based on the Wu-Tang Clan leader's alter-ego, Bobby Digital.

=== Music ===
During his tenure at Priority Records, Wilson worked extensively on several projects, including the Training Day original soundtrack which he A&R'd. In 2001, Wilson left his position as Director of A&R at Priority Records to found the independent label, Babygrande Records. Wilson said, "Early on, when I saw the whole consolidation trend starting to occur with major labels, I decided to branch out and start a small indie label". Babygrande was initially funded by the money Wilson made from selling his scripts to Hollywood and operated from Wilson's apartment. The label has released over two hundred titles, including albums from M.O.P., GZA of Wu-Tang Clan, U-God of Wu-Tang Clan, Raekwon The Chef of Wu-Tang Clan, Brand Nubian, Grand Puba, Jedi Mind Tricks, Army Of The Pharaohs, Canibus, Hi-Tek and Sa-Ra, among others.

In 2004, SOHH (Support Online Hip Hop)) recognized Wilson as a "player to watch". He was also named one of Billboard Magazine's 2005 Power Players. He has also been cited as an authority on piracy by Billboard Magazine.

=== Television ===
Wilson served as Director of Business Affairs at Black Entertainment Television. Among other initiatives, Wilson assisted with the company's launch of its first made for television feature film division, BET Pictures and the production of its initial ten "Arabesque Films". The original slate of ten films was historic in that it represented the largest single slate of African-American themed films ever produced.

=== Technology ===
In 2006, Wilson and several other partners formed Triumph Media Holdings, Inc which launched the first Hip-Hop social media network, Crackspace. The press dubbed the website, "A Myspace/YouTube for hip-hop". In 2008, the site re-launched under the name iHipHop.

=== Sports ===
In 1992 Wilson was an intern at ProServ.

In 2022, Wilson launched Babygrande Golf which has since become the leader in the live streaming of junior and college golf and described its current mission to support the worldwide growth and development of golf. Since its launch, Babygrande Golf has sponsored tournaments with the AJGA, PGA Tour Player Cameron Champ's Mack Champ Invitational, and recently announced the Babygrande DC Classic, a new tournament and partnership with the AJGA and the National Links Trust.

To date Babygrande Golf has provided various types of coverage of the following tournaments:

- The Babygrande Donald Ross Collegiate
- The ANNIKA 3M Intercollegiate
- The Pinehust Donald Ross North & South
- The Mack Champ Invitational
- The East Lake Cup
- The Golf Club of Georgia Collegiate
- The UVA Lewis Chitengwa Collegiate
- The APGA Farmers Insurance Invitational
- The UVA Women's Collegiate Invitational at Guadalajara Country Club
- The Hamptons Invitational
- The Women's NCAA Regionals at UVA
- The MetPGA Junior
- The AJGA Babygrande Stanford Junior Allstar
- The AJGA Babygrande DC Classic (Newcomer of the Year)
- The AJGA Atlanta classic (Newcomer of the Year)
- The AJGA Vegas Shootout
- the AJGA Salem Golf Club GPC Open
- The Rocket Mortgage John John Shippen Invitational

Wilson serves on the boards of the National Links Trust and The Cameron Champ Foundation.

== Personal life ==
Wilson grew up in Rockville, Maryland and graduated from Rockville High School in 1986 where he played for the Varsity Golf team under Coach Herb DuMars.

Wilson's mother, Rose Greene, was one of the first nine Black students admitted to the University of Florida. Wilson's father, Charles Lee Wilson Sr, was a D2 basketball player at Bethune-Cookman University and later became the Director of Admissions at Howard University.

Wilson graduated from the University of Virginia, earning a Bachelor of Arts from the School of Architecture in 1990. He continued his graduate studies at The University of Virginia and went on to earn a Juris Doctor from the University of Virginia School of Law and a Masters of Business Administration from the Darden Graduate School of Business Administration (JD/MBA) in 1994. As an undergraduate at the University of Virginia, Wilson was President of the university's NAACP chapter, and was selected to live in Thomas Jefferson's Academic Village also known as The Lawn which is among the highest student honors at the university. Wilson has been a member of the Kappa Alpha Psi fraternity since 1987. He also studied film at New York University's Tisch School of the Arts.

In 2005, he married Jenise Campbell.
