= Zilla (rapper) =

American rapper

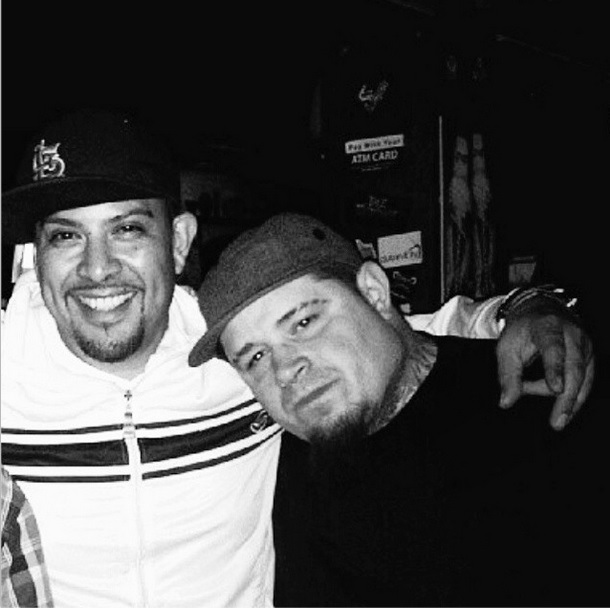
- Zilla (left) with Vinnie Paz

Background information
- Also known as: VG Skillz; V-Zilla; Blue Collared MC; Zilla the Monster
- Born: Victor Gurrola Jr.
- Origin: Houston, Texas, U.S.
- Genres: Hip hop, Southern hip hop
- Years active: 1999–present
- Labels: Babygrande, Enemy Soil South, Monster Musick Group
- Member of: Army of the Pharaohs

Victor Gurrola Jr., better known by his stage name Zilla (formerly VG Skillz and V-Zilla), is an American underground rapper and producer from Houston, Texas. He is known for his style of rap, which combines East Coast hip hop with his native Southern hip hop. In 2010, Zilla became a member of hip hop supergroup Army of the Pharaohs, founded by Jedi Mind Tricks frontman Vinnie Paz.

Coming out of Houston, Zilla got his start posting music online. He was discovered by Swedish producer Moonshine, leading to his successful 2001 debut album E.X.H.A.L.E. The album Lockdown Sessions followed in 2004, and three years later he joined forces with Houston locals S.W.A.T. Music Project, changing his style to the more traditional Southern hip hop style with his collaboration album Empty Bottles and Full Ashtrays in 2008.

Returning to his more lyrical, East Coast-influenced roots, he mounted a comeback with 2011's Interview with a Monster, letting it be known that his previous style was a "gross miscalculation" and that he was going to make music the way he feels and marks an official return. Zilla made his first appearance with Army of the Pharaohs on their fourth studio album, In Death Reborn, released in 2014.

== Career ==
=== Early career (1997–1999) ===
Victor Gurrola Jr. started rapping with his initials VG Skillz. He used to participate in numerous rap battles in his hometown of Houston, Texas. He stated that Houston was the city with which he had a love-hate relationship, as many people from Houston did not recognize him and showed him hate for his unique style of rapping.

=== W.I.S.D.O.M. and E.X.H.A.L.E. (2000–2002) ===
In 2002, VG Skillz followed up his 2000 debut album W.I.S.D.O.M. with E.X.H.A.L.E. Although W.I.S.D.O.M. was VG Skillz' first album, E.X.H.A.L.E. is considered to be his debut solo album. It was over the Internet that VG Skillz hooked up with the Swedish group The Narcs (now known as The Narcissists). Checking out each other's tracks online led to VG Skillz appearing on their debut, "Temporarily Forever". In return, Narcs producer Moonshine offered to furnish some beats for VG Skillz second joint. They ended up with a total of 11 tracks, with VG Skillz recording his vocals in Houston and Moonshine mixing and mastering the tracks in Stockholm, Sweden. The track "Lethal" contained a guest appearance from Ebomb.

The album was recognized as an "intercontinental collaboration that definitely makes sense". It samples tracks from Excaliber's gloomy "Realize" to Surgeon General's physical "Hot Rhymes". Somewhere on "E.X.H.A.L.E.", VG Skillz says that he would "never ever sacrifice substance for the flow." The self-described "Blue Collared MC" gained recognition for his flow. It was released via Ill Dyalect Records.

=== Lockdown sessions (2003–2005) ===
In 2003, VG Skillz changed his name to V-Zilla. V-Zilla describes himself "as the underdog". After two albums under the name VG Skillz and two years of opening for or performing with underground acts like Atmosphere and Jedi Mind Tricks, V-Zilla would eventually get his own time in the underground spotlight. He released his third album, The Lockdown Sessions; though the album's intro is somewhat clichéd (V-Zilla is sentenced to life in prison for "attempted musical murder").

"I don't got money for that Neptunes production, yo I'm not a gimmick rapper, not how I function yo See I don't wanna be that cat that fades in the dark I'm not a follower, I wanna be state-of-the-art"

— Zilla describes his experience with the music industry.

In 2004, V-Zilla collaborated with Swedish producer Astma on his compilation album Astma Presents on the track "I'm Back". V-Zilla was also credited on the track "Soul" by underground rapper Bucc from The Narcissist; the single was later featured on the EP The Soul EP and the album Independent Perfekshun. V-Zilla was also featured on the song "Remain Cautious" by K-Otix on the album Ethos.

=== Empty Bottles and Full Ashtray (2006–2008) ===
Several years later, V-Zilla joined forces with Houston locals S.W.A.T.'s (South West Alief Texas) music project, switching his style to the more traditional Southern hip hop style of music with a collaborative album titled Empty Bottles and Full Ashtrays in 2008. What Houston blog press said about this part of V-Zilla's career is that "When his city finally knew him, the world took notice because he was spitting the worst rap of his career. He'll tell you himself the reason he wants to be alone is because what went wrong in his career would've gone right, if he did it on his own." V-Zilla himself said that this set himself four years back as a "backup singer in Rob G's boy band."

=== Interview with a Monster, name change and joining Army of the Pharaohs (2009–2013) ===
Returning to his more lyrical, East Coast-influenced roots, V-Zilla mounts a comeback with Interview with a Monster, letting it be known that his previous style was a "gross miscalculation" and that he is going to make music the way he feels, and marks an official return. Many of the tracks on this album were self-produced; the album release comes with the tracks "Most Incredible", "The Rain" and "Duck Down" with Reef the Lost Cauze, and "Flatline" featuring Vinnie Paz and Blacastan.

Paz asked V-Zilla to join Army of the Pharaohs in 2011, but it wasn't official until 2012 when it was announced he and Connecticut's Blacastan were added to the group. On 4 January 2013, V-Zilla released an EP titled The A.D.D.I.C.T. It contained self-produced tracks and production from Swedish producer and long time friend Moonshine.

In late 2013, V-Zilla changed his name to a more simplified Zilla; he first showed off his name performing with Wu-Tang Clan member Raekwon.

=== In Death Reborn and Martyr Musick (2014–present) ===
On 8 April 2014, in an interview with The Underground Vault, Zilla announced he was working on his fourth studio album titled Martyr Musick. The album was initially set to be released sometime June 2014, but as of September 2014, it still hasn not been released.

== Discography ==
=== Studio albums ===
- 2002: E.X.H.A.L.E.
- 2004: The Lockdown Sessions
- 2011: Interview With a Monster
- TBA: Martyr Musick

=== Extended plays ===
- The A.D.D.I.C.T. EP (2013)

=== Collaboration albums ===
- Empty Bottles and Full Ashtrays (2008) with S.W.A.T. Product Music
- The Monster and Mr. Arnell (2014) with Lawrence Arnell

=== Army of the Pharaohs ===
- In Death Reborn (2014)
- Heavy Lies the Crown (2014)

=== Other releases ===
- W.I.S.D.O.M. (2000)
