= Snowgoons =

German hip hop production team

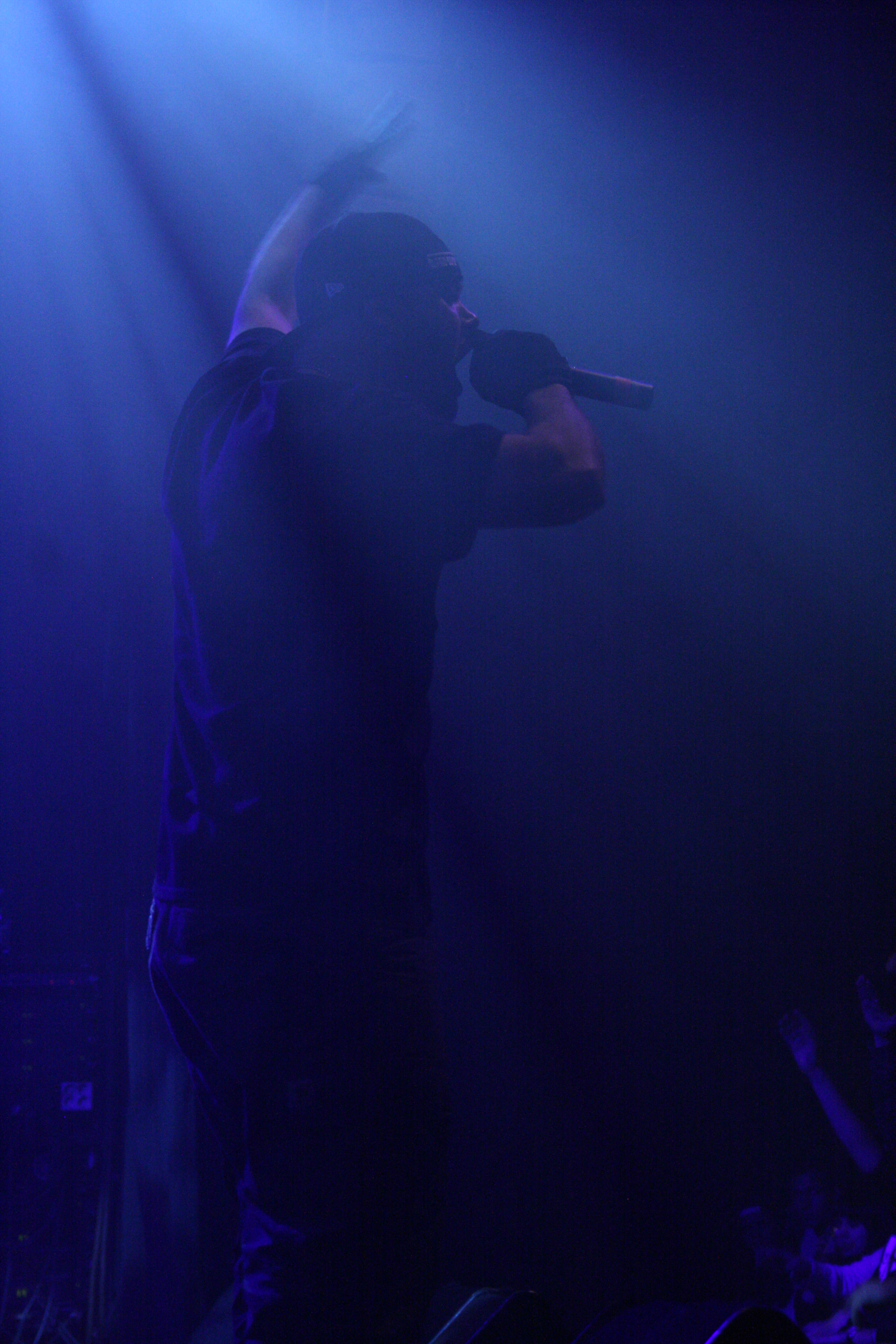
- Sicknature in 2019

Background information
- Origin: Germany
- Genre: Hip-hop
- Years active: 1999–present
- Labels: Goon MuSick; Babygrande
- Members: Det Gunner; DJ Illegal; Sicknature
- Past members: J.S. Kuster; DJ Waxwork; Torben
- Website: snowgoons.de

Snowgoons is a German underground hip-hop production team composed of DJ Illegal (Manuu Rückert) and Det Gunner (D. Keller). In 2011, producers Sicknature (Jeppe Andersen) from Denmark and J.S. Kuster (Johann Sebastian Kuster) from Germany joined the group.

== History ==
Det and DJ Illegal first started in 1999 as the two original members. In 2006, they decided to add a third member, Torben from Germany, who was a part of the group until 2008. After Torben left, they decided to add a third member again in the same year, DJ Waxwork from Germany, who was a part of the group until 2009. The Snowgoons are known for using orchestral/epic samples and for working with underground MCs, like members of Wu-Tang Clan, AOTP, Boot Camp Click and La Coka Nostra. The team cite DJ Premier, Alchemist and RZA as influences. They have released several Snowgoons albums. They also did several collaboration albums with artists like Reef the Lost Cauze, M.O.P., PMD and Sean Strange (as Goondox) and Onyx. They planned to release an album with the hiphop group Krush Unit for several years, but the album was never released.

In 2011, they launched their own record label called Goon MuSick. In 2020, J.S. Kuster departed from Snowgoons and then started to go by the name Tengo and formed a duo rap group with the German rapper named BX under the name “Tengo & BX”.

== Members ==
Current members

- Det Gunner (1999–present)
- DJ Illegal (1999–present)
- Sicknature (2011–present)

Former members

- Torben (2006–2008)
- DJ Waxwork (2008–2009)
- J.S. Kuster (2011–2020)

== Discography ==
Logo

=== Albums ===
Year	Album details
2007	German Lugers: Released: 27 February 2007; Label: Babygrande Records; Format: CD, Vinyl LP
2008	Black Snow: Released: 20 June 2008; Label: Babygrande Records; Format: CD, Vinyl LP
2009	A Fist in the Thought (featuring Savage Brothers & Lord Lhus): Released: 26 May 2009; Label: Babygrande Records; Format: CD
2009	The Trojan Horse: Released: 27 October 2009; Label: Babygrande Records; Format: CD
2010	Kraftwerk: Released: 7 December 2010; Label: iHipHop Distribution; Format: CD
2011	The Iron Fist (featuring Savage Brothers & Lord Lhus): Released: 5 April 2011; Label: Goon MuSick; Format: CD
2011	Virohazard (Remix EP) (featuring Viro the Virus): Released: 28 June 2011; Label: Goon MuSick; Format: CD
2011	Your Favorite MC (featuring Reef the Lost Cauze): Released: 25 October 2011; Label: iHipHop Distribution/Goon MuSick; Format: CD
2011	Sparta (featuring M.O.P.): Released: 21 November 2011; Label: Babygrande Records; Format: CD
2012	Terroristen Volk (German album): Released: 16 March 2012; Label: Goon MuSick; Format: CD
2012	Snowgoons Dynasty: Released: 17 July 2012; Label: Babygrande Records; Format: CD, Vinyl LP
2013	Welcome to the Goondox (feat. PMD & Sean Strange as Goondox): Released: 9 April 2013; Label: Goon MuSick/Illseed/RBC Records; Format: CD
2013	CoVirt Ops: Infantry (featuring Virtuoso) Released: 16 July 2013: Label: Goon MuSick/Big Bang Records; Format: CD
2013	Black Snow 2: Released: 13 December 2013; Label: Goon MuSick; Format: CD, Vinyl LP
2014	#Wakedafucup (featuring Onyx): Released: 18 March 2014; Label: Goon MuSick/Mad Money; Format: CD, LP
2014	Grind Over Matter (featuring Aspects): Released: 29 August 2014; Label: Goon MuSick; Format: CD
2014	KillaGoons (featuring Killakikitt): Released: 6 September 2014; Label: Scarcity Budapest/Goon MuSick; Format: CD
2014	Bodhiguard (featuring Absztrakkt): Released: 17 October 2014; Label: 58Muzik; Format: CD, LP
2015	Trapped in America (featuring N.B.S.): Released: 14 July 2015; Label: Big Bang Records/Goon MuSick; Format: CD
2015	Gebrüder Grimm (English and German album): Released: 4 September 2015; Label: Wolfpack Entertainment/Goon MuSick; Format: CD
2016	GoonBap: Released: 12 December 2016; Label: Goon MuSick; Format: CD
2018	King (featuring Nine): Released: 9 September 2018; Label: Goon MuSick; Format: CD
2019	Misanthrop (featuring Marph): Released: 28 February 2019; Label: Goon MuSick/; Format: CD, LP
2019	Infantry: Released: 29 March 2019; Label: Goon MuSick/; Format: CD, LP
2019	From Jersey to Germany: Released: 20 April 2019; Label: Goon MuSick/; Format: CD, LP
2019	SnowMads (featuring Onyx): Released: 15 November 2019; Label: Goon MuSick/Mad Money; Format: CD, LP
2020	Omnicide (featuring Wise Intelligent): Released: 18 September 2020; Label: Goon MuSick; Format: CD
2020	Still Trapped in America (featuring N.B.S.): Released: 6 November 2020; Label: Big Bang Records/Goon MuSick; Format: CD
2021	The Come Up (featuring K-Prez): Released: 6 June 2021; Label: Goon MuSick; Format: CD
2021	Blood Oath (featuring Beni-Hana* & Qualm): Released: 20 November 2021; Label: Goon MuSick; Format: CD
2022	1st of Da Month: Released: 1 July 2022; Label: Goon MuSick; Format: CD
2022	Renaissance Kings: Released: 14 January 2022; Label: Goon MuSick; Format: CD
2022	Hellspawn (featuring Benny Holiday & Gibby Stites): Released: 15 July 2022; Label: Goon MuSick; Format: CD
2022	U.z.i. Universal Zeitgeist Intelligence (featuring Planet Asia): Released: 11 November 2022; Label: Goon MuSick; Format: CD
2023	Goon Mode (featuring Lingo and Ayok): Released: 24 March 2023; Label: Goon MuSick; Format: CD
2023	1St Of Da Month Vol. 2: Released: 1 September 2023; Label: Goon MuSick; Format: CD
2024	1St of Da Month Vol. 3 D: Released: 1 September 2024; Label: Goon MuSick; Format: CD

=== Mixtapes/compilations ===
Year	Album details
2009	German Snow: Released: 2009; Format: CD
2010	Black Luger: Released: 2010; Format: CD
2010	Sicknature & Snowgoons: Banished from Home: Released: 17 January 2010; Format: CD
2015	Independent Warriors: Released: 22 May 2015; Label: Goon MuSick; Format: CD
2015	The Best of Snowgoons: Released: 21 August 2015; Label: iHipHop Distribution/Babygrande Records; Format: CD

=== Other ===
Year	Album details
2004	Clip Full of Ammo/ The Inauguration/ Hard to Catch: Released: 2004; Label: Hot Shit Records; Format: 12" Vinyl Single
2009	German Lugers + Black Snow (Instrumentals): Released: 6 March 2009; Label: Babygrande Records; Format: CD

=== Sicknature ===
Year	Album details
1999	Limitless Prospects (EP): Released: 5 October 1999; Label: DTM Management; Format: LP
2002	The Sicknature (mixtape): Released: 2002; Label: Final Kut; Format: CD
2006	Storm of the Century Mixtape featuring Capione: Released: 2006; Label: self-released; Format: CD
2007	Honey I'm Home: Released: 9 October 2007; Label: Sicknature; Format: CD
2013	Nature of the Contaminated: Released: 30 September 2013; Label: Goon MuSick; Format: CD, LP
2017	Copenhagen Kaiju (EP): Released: 24 November 2017; Label: Poetic Droid/Goon MuSick; Format: CD
2023	Paintings of a Withering Forest: Released: 5 May 2017; Label: Goon MuSick; Format: CD

== Production discography ==
- 2003
  - Donald D – The Return of the Culture
- 2005
  - Doujah Raze – The Inauguration
  - Majik Most – Who What When Where (feat. Celph Titled)
- 2006
  - ATMA - The Halls of Amenti
  - The Devil'z Rejects – Incredibles
  - The Devil'z Rejectz – Dead Man Walking
- 2007
  - Apathy – A.O.T.P.
- 2008
  - Brooklyn Academy – The Last Passion
  - Brooklyn Academy – Black Out (feat. Jean Grae)
  - Canibus & Oobe – PL∞-Spitfest (Poet Laureate Infinity Mix)
  - Canibus – War (Poet Laureate Infinity Mix)
  - Dra-Q & Damion Davis – Rewind that sh!t
  - King Syze – Cement Work
  - Sabac Red – The Commitment
  - Doap Nixon – Heaven Is Calling (feat. Cynthia Holliday)
- 2009
  - NATO ft J-Ro (The Alkaholiks) – Cross Boarders
  - NATO – Broadcast (feat. Blak Twang & Seanie T.)
  - Nervous Wreck & Chino XL – Knucklesandwich
  - Godilla – Lion's Den / The Getback (feat. Adlib & UG)
  - King & The Cauze – Snowgoons (feat. Adlib, Ali Armz & Godilla)
  - Randam Luck – Street Goons (feat. Jimmy Powers)
  - Randam Luck – Verbal Holocaust remix (feat. Ill Bill)
  - Randam Luck – Raw remix (feat. Vinnie Paz)
  - Viro the Virus – Heat
  - Para Bellum – Az Első Menet
  - Para Bellum – Torkolattűz
  - Sick Jacken (of Psycho Realm) – Sick Life (feat. Cynic & Bacardi Riam)
- 2010
  - Psych Ward – Lost Planet (feat. Snored Putz)
  - Chief Kamachi – 2nd Lecture
  - M-Dot – The Real & the Raw remix (feat. Jaysaun of Special Teamz)
  - Mark Deez – The Oracle (feat. Dr iLL & Powder)
  - Mark Deez – I'm Here Now
  - Fanatik – Franchement
  - Revolution of the Mind – Die for My People
  - The Lost Children of Babylon – Babylon A.D.
  - The Lost Children of Babylon – Skull & Bones
  - The Lost Children of Babylon – Beware The Zeitgeist
  - The Lost Children of Babylon – The Venus Project
  - Sean Strange – Diabolical Decibels (feat. Exlib, Meth Mouth & Nems)
  - Powder – Flowers
  - N.B.S. – B.O.S.T.O.N.
- 2011
  - Killakikitt – Intro
  - Killakikitt – A kocka el van vetve (feat. NKS)
- 2012
  - N.B.S. – The Essence of Real Rap (feat. Akrobatik)
- 2013
  - Demigodz – The Summer of Sam
  - Nature – New York Niggaz
  - Psych Ward – Subterranean (feat. Solomon Child, J Reno & Banish)
  - Hus Kingpin – Pyramid Points (feat. Rozewood)
  - N.B.S. – Perm Time
  - N.B.S. – Smiley (feat. Smiley & Sicknature)
- 2014
  - Diabolic – Suffolk's Most Wanted (feat. R.A. the Rugged Man)
  - Diabolic – Bad Dream
- 2016
  - Golden Era Cypher
