= Reef the Lost Cauze =

American rapper

- Also known as: Sharif; Reef; Lost Cauze
- Born: Sharif Talib Lacey; December 30, 1981 (age 44)
- Origin: Philadelphia, Pennsylvania, U.S.
- Genres: Underground hip-hop
- Occupations: Rapper; singer
- Years active: 1998–present
- Labels: Babygrande; Good Hands

Sharif Talib Lacey, better known by his stage name Reef the Lost Cauze, is an American underground rapper based in Philadelphia, Pennsylvania. Cauze became well known on the underground circuit towards the late 1990s and more so in the early 2000s, making his mark by winning many battle competitions within New York and interstate and displaying rare skills of what many called true MCing.

Releasing The High Life album in 2001, Cauze moved on by teaming up with his past partners and friends and released The Invisible Empire in 2003 to much critical acclaim and thus establishing his name amongst many circles and true hip-hop heads, as well as the underground. Feast or Famine was released in 2005 again to positive critical reception, as well as his side project, The Torture Papers, being part of the rap/hip-hop supergroup Army of the Pharaohs in 2006. Reef is also part of hip-hop underground groups; JuJu Mob & Army of the Pharaohs.

== Career ==
=== Beginnings (1998-2000) ===
Born Sharif Lacey in West Philadelphia, Reef the Lost Cauze came up in hip-hop as a lethal battle-rap MC. Having spent a great deal of his childhood acting in plays and performing, Reef fell in love with hip-hop at the age of eight and has been rhyming ever since. By the time he reached high school, he had earned a reputation as a deadly battle emcee, jumping in any and every cipher he came across. It was not until he was accepted into Philadelphias University of the Arts on a film scholarship that he began to visualize a serious career on the mic. He began to hone his songwriting skills, and worked on perfecting his stage shows. He defeated opponents in all types of venues, from school grounds to grimy back alleys to professional competitions. In 2000, despite obtaining a scholarship, Reef dropped out of college where he was studying film school only at the age 19 to focus on his music realizing that he had found his true calling as a hip-hop artist.

=== The High Life and Invisible Empire (2001-2004) ===
He linked up with Philadelphia producer Sleep E early in 2002 to begin recording his first solo project, The High Life which was released in 2002. The 10-track album opened doors for Reef, and he began performing at area clubs, generating praise from fans and media alike. In February 2003, Reef released his second studio album Invisible Empire, an 18-track album that he distributed himself by way of a national schedule of shows. He won the Mic Check Battle in Philadelphia in 2003, after which he travelled to Oakland, California to take 2nd place in the Blaze Freestyle Battle. Titles and accolades aside, Reef describes the first year of his recording career as a time of growth, both professionally and personally. Life experience really came about in my writing, he says. I was comfortable with reaching beyond being simply an emcee and becoming a musician.

Reef went on to say; I really wanted to take chances and play around with rhythm and flow, I lost all fear. The High Life was very basic as far song concepts, whereas with Invisible Empire I was very aware of the importance of dope, full beats. The second album brought out my thoughts and observations, and it erased a lot of things I had pent up inside. Invisible Empire put his name on the map for Philadelphia's underground rap scene. Nonetheless, it was the regional and national battle-rap competitions that gave his career a real boost. He finally landed an album deal jointly with Eastern Conference and Good Hands, the former owned by New York underground MC/DJ pair the High & Mighty.

Early in 2004, Reef continued to freestyle, with a rousing performance at the Beat Society production competition in New York, and a win in the Riddle Records/Music & Strength Mic Control 3 battle taking home $10,000 in cash. He was also the End Of The Weak Challenge Champion at the Rock Steady Crew 27th Anniversary in July 2004, and went on to take the EOW Grand Championship title in 2005.

=== Feast or Famine, JuJu Mob & Army of the Pharaohs (2005-2007) ===
Reef announced that he was working on a new project and that he has put "a lot of life and business experiences into it". This project was soon found out to be his third studio album Feast Or Famine, and his range of expression will allow fans the opportunity to truly identify with him. This album is me at the top of my game, says Reef. I know who I am as a person, but more importantly as an artist - I feel like a pro this time around. The beats are more sonic, and although the mood is a little darker than my first two projects, the songs have a universal appeal that everyone will be able to relate to. The less well-rounded effort Feast or Famine arrived in 2005, boasting the DJ Mighty Mi-produced "Fair One," which also featured Boot Camp Clik's top MC Sean Price, as the lead 12" single. In the years that followed his third album, a few local mixtapes were released, but the Philadelphia MC had success in doing several collaborations and features. He was invited into the Philadelphia crew JuJu Mob, who released their 2005 album Black Candles on Eastern Conference, as well as the underground super-collective Army of the Pharaohs, led by Jedi Mind Tricks frontman Vinnie Paz, in 2006. He was featured on both albums The Torture Papers and Ritual of Battle.

=== A Vicious Cycle, The Stress Files & The Unholy Terror (2008-2010) ===
In 2008, Reef released his fifth album, which contained production completely from Stress the White Boy; The Stress Files. He also made a return for Army of the Pharaohs third studio album; The Unholy Terror in 2010.

=== Your Favourite MC, High Life (2011-2013) ===
On October 25, 2011 Reef released Your Favorite MC alongside production team Snowgoons. It was released on Goon MuSick and iHipHop Distribution. The album is entirely produced by the Snowgoons.

Reef announced he was working on a remake on his debut album The High Life, titled High Life 2013. It is the fifth studio album from him and was released on December 17, 2013. It was confirmed that it is the re-release as well as the sequel of The High Life.

== Discography ==
Studio albums

- The High Life (2001)
- Invisible Empire (2003)
- Feast or Famine (2005)
- A Vicious Cycle (2008)
- High Life 2013 (2013)
- The Majestic (2018)
- The Triumphant (2024)

Collaborative albums

- Black Candles (with JuJu Mob) (2005)
- The Torture Papers (with Army of the Pharaohs) (2006)
- Ritual of Battle (with Army of the Pharaohs) (2007)
- The Stress Files (Produced by Stress The White Boy) (2008)
- The Unholy Terror (with Army of the Pharaohs) (2010)
- Fight Music (Produced by Guns-N-Butter) (2010)
- Your Favorite MC (Produced by Snowgoons) (2011)
- Year of the Hyenas (with King Syze) (2014)
- The Fast Way (Produced by Emynd) (2014)
- In Death Reborn (with Army of the Pharaohs) (2014)
- Heavy Lies the Crown (with Army of the Pharaohs) (2014)
- Furious Styles (Produced by Bear-One) (2016)
- The Airing of Grievances (Produced by Haj of Dumhi) (2020)
- Reef the Lost Cauze Iz Alive (Produced by Caliph-Now) (2022)
- Murderers Row (with King Syze, OuterSpace & Snowgoons) (2025)
