= David Banner discography =

- Studio albums: 7
- Singles: 18
- Mixtapes: 1

The following is a select discography of albums and singles released by or featuring American rapper, producer, and actor, David Banner.

== Albums ==
=== Studio albums ===
List of albums, with selected chart positions
Title	Album details	Peak chart positions		
Title	Album details	US	US R&B	US Rap
Them Firewater Boyz, Vol. 1	Released: August 15, 2000; Label: Big Face; Format: CD, cassette digital download	—	—	—
Mississippi: The Album	Released: May 20, 2003; Label: SRC, Universal; Format: CD, digital download, LP	9	1	1
MTA2: Baptized in Dirty Water	Released: December 23, 2003; Label: SRC, Universal; Format: CD, digital download, LP	69	19	—
Certified	Released: September 20, 2005; Label: SRC, Universal; Format: CD, digital download, LP	6	3	2
The Greatest Story Ever Told	Released: July 15, 2008; Label: SRC, Universal; Format: CD, digital download, LP	8	3	3
Death of a Pop Star (with 9th Wonder)	Released: December 21, 2010; Label: Big Face, IWWMG, E; Format: CD, digital download, LP	—	41	17
#TheGodBox	Released: May 19, 2017; Label: A Banner Vision; Format: CD, digital download, LP	76	38	—

=== Mixtapes ===
List of mixtapes, with year released
Title	Album details
Undaground, Vol. 1	Released: May 5, 2003; Label: Big Face; Format: CD, digital download
Sex, Drugs & Video Games	Released: May 22, 2012; Label: Self-released; Format: Digital download
Before the Box	Released: March 9, 2016; Label: Self-released; Format: Digital download

== Singles ==
=== As lead artist ===
Title	Year	Peak chart positions			Certifications	Album
Title	Year	US	US R&B	US Rap	Certifications	Album
"Caught up in the Game" Promotional-only release	1998	—	—	—		Crooked Lettaz: Grey Skies
"Firewater" (featuring Noreaga)	1999	—	—	—		Crooked Lettaz: Grey Skies
"Like a Pimp" (featuring Lil' Flip)	2003	48	15	10		Undaground, Vol. 1 & Mississippi: The Album
"Cadillac on 22's"	2003	—	83	—		Mississippi: The Album
"Crank It Up" (featuring Static Major)	2004	—	87	—		MTA2: Baptized in Dirty Water
"Ain't Got Nothing" (featuring Magic and Lil Boosie)	2005	—	93	—		Certified
"Play"	2005	7	5	3	RIAA: Gold	Certified
"Touching" (featuring Jazze Pha)	2005	—	54	—		Certified
"9mm" (featuring Akon, Lil Wayne and Snoop Dogg)	2007	—	66	—		The Greatest Story Ever Told
"Get Like Me" (featuring Chris Brown)	2008	16	7	2		The Greatest Story Ever Told
"Shawty Say" (featuring Lil Wayne)	2008	110	53	25		The Greatest Story Ever Told
"Slow Down" (with 9th Wonder, featuring Heather Victoria)	2010	—	—	—		Death of a Pop Star
"Be with You" (with 9th Wonder, featuring Ludacris and Marsha Ambrosius)	2010	—	44	—		Death of a Pop Star
"Swag"	2011	—	—	—		Sex, Drugs & Video Games
"Yao Ming" (featuring 2 Chainz and ASAP Rocky)	2011	—	—	—		Sex, Drugs & Video Games
"Amazing" (featuring Chris Brown)	2012	—	—	—		Sex, Drugs & Video Games
"My Uzi" (featuring Big K.R.I.T.)	2015	—	—	—		The God Box
"Marry Me" (featuring Rudy Currence)	2015	—	—	—		The God Box
"—" denotes non-charting release or chart position to be determined.

== Guest appearances ==
List of non-single guest appearances, with other performing artists, showing year released and album name
Title	Year	Other artist(s)	Album
"My Shorty"	2000	Fiend	Can I Burn?
"Get Crunk"	2002	Lil' Flip, Big T, Lil'Ron	Undaground Legend
"What Ya'll Wanna Do"	2002	Lil' Flip, C-Note	Undaground Legend
"Air Forces One" (Remix)	2003	Nelly, 8Ball	Da Derrty Versions: The Reinvention
"Puttin' In Work"	2003	Bone Crusher, Lady Ice	AttenCHUN!
"Anybody Can Get It"	2003	E-40, Lil Jon, Bone Crusher	Breakin' News
"My Shorty"	2003	Fiend	Can I Burn? 2
"Like A Pimp"	2003	Snoop Dogg, Daz Dillinger	Welcome 2 Tha Chuuch Mixtape, Vol. 2
"Hey Ho"	2003	Snoop Dogg, Nate Dogg	Welcome 2 Tha Chuuch Mixtape, Vol. 2
"This Is The Way We Pimp"	2003	Snoop Dogg, Tripp Loc	Welcome 2 Tha Chuuch Mixtape, Vol. 2
"Muthaf**ka"	2003	Alfamega	
"See About Ya"	2003	Beezel, Bone Crusher	
"Tear It Up"	2004	Yung Wun, Lil' Flip, DMX	The Dirtiest Thirstiest
"OopDeeWopDee"	2004	NSS16, Aloe Blacc	
"Walk It Talk It"	2004	Yung Wun	
"Represent"	2004	Lil' Flip, Three 6 Mafia	U Gotta Feel Me
"Ain't No nigga"	2004	Lil' Flip	U Gotta Feel Me
"Welcome To The South"	2004	Young Buck, Lil' Flip	Straight Outta Cashville
"Drama"	2004	DJ Kay Slay, Lil Jon, Bun B, Baby D	The Streetsweeper, Vol. 2
"How We Ride"	2004	Mannie Fresh, Jasper, Bun B	The Mind of Mannie Fresh
"All the Way to St. Lou"	2004	Chingy, Nate Dogg	Powerballin'
"24's Scrub"	2004	Gangsta Pat	Da Dro
"Talkin' That Talk"	2005	Chamillionaire	Man On Fire
"Fakeass Hoes"	2005	The Dogg Pound	Cali Iz Active
"Cold Cold World"	2005	The Ill, Max Minelli	Magical Glo
"Yeah Mufucka"	2006	Ludacris	Pre-Release Therapy
"U Scared"	2006	Tyrese, Lil Scrappy	Alter Ego
"Role Models"	2006	Rich Boy, Attitude	Rich Boy
"Baller"	2006	Too Short	Blow the Whistle
"Land Of Trill"	2006	Messy Marv	What You Know bout Me?
"Seein' Thangs"	2006	DJ Shadow	The Outsider
"Hit Me Up"	2006	Nathan Stone	Platinum Tunes Issue #26
"West Side"	2006	Hood Surgeon	The Autopsy Mixtape
"We Them"	2007	N.O.R.E.	Cocaine On Steroids
"Get On Da Floor"	2007	Ali & Gipp	Kinfolk
"Musik N' Money"	2007	Young Bleed	Once Upon a Time in Amedica
"Take It To The Yard"	2007	Q.G.	The Resurrection
"You're Everything"	2008	Bun B, Rick Ross, 8Ball & MJG	II Trill
"Cool"	2008	Anthony Hamilton	The Point of It All
"Superfriend"	2008	Mary Mary	The Sound
"Black President" (Remix Pt.1)	2008	DJ Green Lantern, Busta Rhymes, Talib Kweli	
"La La" (Remix)	2008	Lil Wayne, Busta Rhymes	
"Numba 1 (Tide Is High)" (Remix)	2008	Kardinal Offishall, Alfamega	
"Middle Finger"	2008	Nas	
"Family Reunion"	2008	Kid Sister	
"Rev It Up"	2008	Qui	
"Who You Testin"	2009	Fresh, Mac Boney	Who U Testin, Vol. 1
"Throw It Up"	2009	Izza Kizza	Wizard Of Iz
"Nightlife"	2009	An-Ya	
"We Come From"	2010	8Ball & MJG	Ten Toes Down
"Dodgin’ Your Phone"	2010	Dwele	W.ants W.orld W.omen
"Give Me the Night"	2010	Quincy Jones, Jamie Foxx	Q Soul Bossa Nostra
"Hikky-Burr"	2010	Quincy Jones, Three 6 Mafia	Q Soul Bossa Nostra
"Give 'Em A Song"	2010	¡Mayday!, Snave Nayr	Lords Of The Fly
"It's A Go"	2010	OJ Da Juiceman	O.R.A.N.G.E. Mixtape
"Mississippi Shine"	2010	Willie "P-Dub" Moore	Turning Point
"Wonderbread"	2010	Big Remo	Entrapment
"4.28.1967, Pt. 2"	2010	Skipp Coon, Mister Nick, Luca Brazi	Sophomore Slump, Vol. 1: Independents Day
"If You Only Knew"	2010	K-Young	Better Then Yo Album, Vol. 1
"S.P.I.T."	2010	G.Q.	EA Sports Soundtrack, Vol. 2
"Life Song'"	2010	Seeda	Breathe
"Laughin'"	2010	HoodStarz	
"Jump On It"	2010	Veze Skante	
"3D"	2011	Game	Purp & Patron
"Sookie Now"	2011	Big K.R.I.T.	Return of 4Eva
"Bust Yo Shit"	2011	Strong Arm Steady, Jean Grae	Arms & Hammers
"Pour It Up"	2011	Kidz in the Hall, Bun B	Occasion
"Ain't Nobody Trippin" (Remix)	2011	Cory Mo, Bun B, Pimp C	
"Coke, Dope, Crack, Smack" (Remix)	2011	J-Doe, Busta Rhymes, T-Pain	
"All Around"	2011	Aubrey Mikel	
"Enjoy The Night"	2012	Xzibit, Brevi, Wiz Khalifa	Napalm
"Through The Motions"	2012	Strong Arm Steady, Statik Selektah, Fiend	Stereo Type
"Down The Ave"	2012	Hezeleo, XVII, Lil Boosie	Kang Amongst Kangs, Vol. 2 (Smoke Cleared)
"Alice In Wonderland"	2012	Gensu Dean	Lo-Fi Fingahz
"Like It Or Love It"	2012	Doe Hicks, Boo Rossini, Cassius	Dope Sauce
"I Look Good"	2012	Doe Hicks, Savvy, Luc	Dope Sauce
"Shoppin'"	2012	Begetz	
"Thyself"	2013	Gensu Dean, Planet Asia, Tragedy Khadafi	Abrasions
"The Who?"	2014	Sa-Roc	Nebuchadnezzar
"True to the Game"	2015	Pimp C	Long Live the Pimp
"Warrior"	2015	DJ EFN, Jon Connor, Sizzla, N.O.R.E.	Another Time
"The Worst Thing"	2015	Dookoom	Silbi Dog EP
"La Policia (Remix)"	2015	Kap G, T.I.	
"Never Let Her Go"	2016	Donell Jones	
"Black Man"	2016	Scotty ATL	
"Life Less Criminal"	2016	Avenue of the Giants, Sa-Roc, Rittz	
"The Cross"	2017	Gensu Dean	
"Unapologetic"	2018	Dell-P, Jay Reezy	Wordsmith
"Knocking At My Door"	2018	9th Wonder, Big K.R.I.T., Jakk Jo	Jamla Is The Squad II

== See also ==
- David Banner production discography
- Crooked Lettaz discography
