= David Banner production discography =

The following is a discography of production by David Banner, an American hip hop recording artist and record producer.

== Singles produced ==
2002

- "Thug Holiday" (Trick Daddy)

2003

- "Rubber Band Man" (T.I.)

2005

- "Walk It, Talk It" (Yung Wun featuring David Banner)
- "Ain't Got Nothing" (featuring Magic & Lil Boosie)

2007

- "They Like Me" (Shop Boyz)
- "Make Em Mad" (Chopper City Boyz)

2008

- "Get Like Me" (featuring Chris Brown & Yung Joc)
- "Shawty Say" (featuring Lil Wayne)

== 1999 ==
Crooked Lettaz- Grey Skies

1. "Mama Lena Intro"

3. "Fire Water"(feat. Noreaga)

4. "South's On My Mind"

6. "Straight Outta Africa"

7. "Daydreamin"

8. "A Girl Named Cim"

9. "It's Ours"(feat. Us)

10. "Tuepelo"

11. "Trill" (produced with Timothy Deal)

15. "Caught In The Game" (produced with Gensu Dean)

16. "I Know"

17. "Outro"

== 2000 ==
=== David Banner - Them Firewater Boyz, Vol.1 ===
- All Tracks

== 2001 ==
=== Ruff Ryders – Ryde or Die Vol. 3: In the "R" We Trust ===
- 7. "Rock Bottom"

== 2002 ==
=== Trick Daddy - Thug Holiday ===
- 5. "Thug Holiday"(featuring LaTocha Scott)

== 2003 ==
=== David Banner - Mississippi: The Album ===
- All Tracks (except five tracks, produced by different producers)

=== Three 6 Mafia - Da Unbreakables ===
- 12. "Rainbow Colors"(feat. Lil' Flip) (produced with DJ Paul and Juicy J)

=== Nappy Roots – Wooden Leather ===
- 2. "Nappy Roots Day"

=== T.I. – Trap Muzik ===
- 8. "Rubber Band Man"

=== David Banner - MTA2: Baptized In Dirty Water ===
- All Tracks (except five or six, maybe seven tracks)

== 2004 ==
=== Chingy – Powerballin' ===
- 10. "All the Way to St. Lou" (featuring Nate Dogg & David Banner)

=== Mannie Fresh – The Mind of Mannie Fresh ===
- 4. "Go With Me" (featuring Birdman)

=== T.I. – Urban Legend ===
- 12. "Countdown"

=== Yung Wun – The Dirtiest Thirstiest ===
- 10. "Walk It, Talk It" (featuring David Banner)

== 2005 ==
=== Chamillionaire – The Longest Yard (soundtrack) ===
- 9. "Talkin' That Talk" (featuring David Banner)

=== David Banner – Certified ===
- 1. "Lost Souls"
- 4. "2 Fingers" (featuring Jagged Edge)
- 7. "Thinking of You" (featuring Case)
- 9. "Certified" (featuring Marcus)
- 10. "Ain't Got Nothing" (featuring Magic & Lil Boosie)
- 11. "Bloody War" (featuring B.G.)
- 13. "Take Your" (featuring Too Short, Bun B, & Talib Kweli)
- 14. "My Life" (featuring Sky)
- 16. "X-ed" (featuring Kamikaze)
- 17. "Crossroads" (featuring Grout)

=== Three 6 Mafia- Most Known Unknown ===
- 10. "Half on a Sack" (produced with DJ Paul and Juicy J)

== 2006 ==
=== Jibbs – Jibbs Featuring Jibbs ===
- 1. "Yeah Boii"

=== Remy Ma - There's Something About Remy ===
- 9. "I'm"

=== Tha Dogg Pound – Cali Iz Active ===
- 13. "Fakeass Hoes" (featuring David Banner)

== 2007 ==
=== Chopper City Boyz – We Got This ===
- 4. "Make Em Mad"

=== Shop Boyz – Rockstar Mentality ===
- 4. "They Like Me"

== 2008 ==
=== David Banner – The Greatest Story Ever Told ===
- 3. "Suicide Doors" (featuring UGK & Kandi Girl)
- 6. "Get Like Me" (featuring Chris Brown & Yung Joc)
- 7. "Shawty Say" (featuring Lil Wayne)
- 9. "Syrup Sippin' (Banner Beat Break)"
- 10. "Hold On" (featuring Marcus)
- 11. "Cadillac On 22's Part 2"
- 12. "Uncle Swacc (Interlude)"
- 15. "B.A.N. (The Love Song)"
- 17. "Marz (Banner Beat Break)"
- 19. "K.O."
- 20. "Fly" (featuring Jazze Pha)
- 22. "Wealth (Banner Beat Break)"

=== Lil Wayne – Tha Carter III ===
- 13. "La La" (featuring Brisco & Busta Rhymes)
- 14. "Pussy Monster"

=== Mary Mary – The Sound ===
- 4. "Superfriend" (featuring David Banner)

=== Bobby Digital – Digi Snacks ===
- 4. "Straight Up the Block"

=== Maroon 5 – Call and Response: The Remix Album ===
- 8. "Wake Up Call" (feat. David Banner)

== 2009 ==
=== Dorrough – Dorrough Music ===
- 6. "Never Changed" (feat. Tomeka Pearl)

=== Young Money – We Are Young Money ===
- 14. "Street Is Watchin'"

== 2010 ==
=== 8Ball & MJG – Ten Toes Down ===
- 03. "I Don't Give A F*ck" (feat. Bun B)

== 2011 ==
=== Snoop Dogg – Doggumentary ===
- 20. "It's D Only Thing" (Produced with THX)

=== Chris Brown – Boy In Detention ===
- 02. "Crazy"
- 11. "Ladies Love Me (featuring Justin Bieber)

=== Various artists – Footloose ===
- 12. "Dance the Night Away" (performed by David Banner)

== 2013 ==
=== Lil Wayne – I Am Not a Human Being II ===
- 19. "Shit Stains" (Bonus Track) (produced with Swiff D)

=== Hustle Gang – G.D.O.D. (Get Dough Or Die) ===
- 20. "Chasing Me" (featuring Iggy Azalea, T.I., Young Dro & Kris Stephens)

=== Lecrae – Church Clothes Vol. 2 ===
- 6. "Let It Whip" (featuring Paul Wall) – (co-produced with Héctor Delgado)

== 2015 ==
=== Ludacris – Ludaversal ===
- 01. "Ludaversal Intro"

=== Jill Scott – Woman ===
- 08. "Closure"

=== Ne-Yo – Non-Fiction ===
- 10. "Religious"

=== Pimp C – Long Live the Pimp ===
- 10. "True to the Game" (featuring David Banner)

== 2024 ==
=== Ice Cube – Man Down ===
- 11. "Fighting For My Paradise" (featuring Kurupt)
- 18. "Take Me To Your Leader"

== Miscellaneous ==
- Lil Wayne
  - "Never Get It"
- Maino
  - "Don't Be Scared" (featuring Chris Brown)
