= Death of a Pop Star =

Studio album by David Banner and 9th Wonder
- Released: December 21, 2010
- Recorded: 2009–10; Bright Lady Studios (Raleigh, North Carolina); Premier Studios (New York City)
- Genre: Hip-hop
- Length: 30:34
- Labels: Big Face Entertainment, eOne Music
- Producers: Executive producer: David Banner Associate producers; Samantha Selolwane; Corey Smyth Music producer; 9th Wonder Additional music producers; David Banner; E. Jones; THX; Warryn Campbell

David Banner chronology
The Greatest Story Ever Told (2008)	Death of a Pop Star (2010)	Sex, Drugs & Video Games (2012)

9th Wonder chronology
Fornever (2010)	Death of a Pop Star (2010)	The Wonder Years (2011)

Singles from Death of a Pop Star
- 1. "Slow Down" Released: November 19, 2010; 2. "Be With You" Released: November 23, 2010

Death of a Pop Star is a 2010 album by hip-hop artists David Banner and 9th Wonder, released on Banner's independent record label, Big Face Entertainment, in conjunction with eOne Music. It is the only collaborative work done together by the two artists and the 9th Wonder's fifteenth collaborative album. The album's title derives from the artists' belief that contemporary black music was declining due to a perceived prioritization of style over substance, and the increasing popularity of music downloads, which they felt was reducing a new artist's chance of reaching the iconic status of previous artists.

Originally conceived as a mixtape, Death of a Pop Star was recorded from 2009 to 2010 at Bright Lady Studios in Raleigh, North Carolina and Premier Studios in New York City. The hip-hop production was mainly handled by 9th Wonder with assistance from David Banner, THX, Warryn Campbell and E. Jones on various tracks. The album includes guest appearances from rappers Ludacris and Big Remo; and singers Erykah Badu, Anthony Hamilton, Marsha Ambrosius, Heather Victoria and Lisa Ivey.

The album was preceded by two official singles – "Slow Down", featuring Heather Victoria, and "Be With You", featuring Ludacris and Marsha Ambrosius. "Be With You" spent thirteen weeks on the Billboard Hot R&B/Hip-Hop Songs, peaking at number 44. The song is Banner's first single to appear on this chart after more than two years. The album sold 7,300 copies in the United States in its first week of release, debuting and peaking at number 14 on the Top Independent Albums chart. A departure from Banner's past recordings, Death of a Pop Star received generally favorable reviews from music critics who deemed it the rapper's best work to date and gave praise to 9th Wonder's production.

== Background ==
Initially, I was working on my own album when I was going through a lot spiritually and mentally... just growing up. I've been able to see just about every aspect of the world, from Third World countries to some of the richest places in Europe and in America. I really got another aspect of how the world looks at Black people, especially young Black males. I didn't want to die with everyone remembering David Banner for the most for 'Play' and 'Get Like Me.' Just as a man that bothered me because historically, the only thing people are going to know about you 500 years from now are the things that's left in books, music and articles. I had a really big problem with that.

— — David Banner speaking in October 2010 with Vibe about the inspiration and drive behind the album.

In July 2008, David Banner released the album The Greatest Story Ever Told, which reached number 3 on the US Billboard Top R&B/Hip-Hop Albums and number 8 on the US Billboard 200, with first-week sales of 51,800 copies. Three singles were released from the album: "Speaker" (also known by the title "9mm"), "Get Like Me" and "Shawty Say". "Get Like Me" reached number 16 on the Billboard Hot 100. The album met with mixed reviews, which disappointed Banner who had expected it to be his defining body of work. Pondering what went wrong, Banner felt marginalized by the music industry's expectations, and therefore, wanted to enlist an elite producer to explore further creative and challenging avenues. "I wanted to feel different, I felt trapped in rap music," Banner admitted. "I felt like I was dying musically."

With the intent of taking a different direction from songs like "Get Like Me" and "Play", Banner considered producers he wanted to work with, including 9th Wonder, Nottz, Just Blaze, DJ Khalil and Madlib. He settled with working with 9th Wonder, who runs a DJ business with a mutual friend. "David Banner and I have a mutual friend by the name of DJ Cuzzin B, who lives now in Washington D.C.," 9th Wonder said. "David Banner came through D.C. and hooked up with [him] and was like, 'Yo, do you know 9th Wonder?' He was like, 'Yeah, that's my partner.' So Banner ended up coming to North Carolina. He was supposed to get a couple beats from me, but he ended up getting nine. That's how Death of a Pop Star came about."

Having produced his own music throughout his career, teaming up with 9th Wonder marks Banner's first time ceding control over production, sticking to microphone duties for the duration of an album. This decision was driven by his motivation to prove to hip-hop listeners that they could place him among any lyricist they like. "I didn't want to produce any of this album. I wanted to prove to people that you could put me on the level of anybody that you like lyrically, and I think I proved that with this record," Banner said. "And it's funny, I'm starting to hear people say that for the first time ever, people have started putting me up against some of the biggest lyricists now. I wanted to just focus on the pen on this album."

The pairing was surprising to many, as Banner's style is defined by his heavily pronounced Southern accent and 808-driven instrumentals, while Wonder is known for his signature style of using muffled percussion, chopping creaky soul samples and arranging these elements into boom bap. Borrowing a sound that originates in New York was a deliberate decision to help draw attention back to Banner's lyrical abilities. "As soon as I added 808s to my music, it seemed like people stopped listening, on top of the fact that I had a very heavy Southern drawl," Banner said. "So I really concentrated on articulating my words this time, but not stomping on or suppressing my Southern accent."

== Title ==
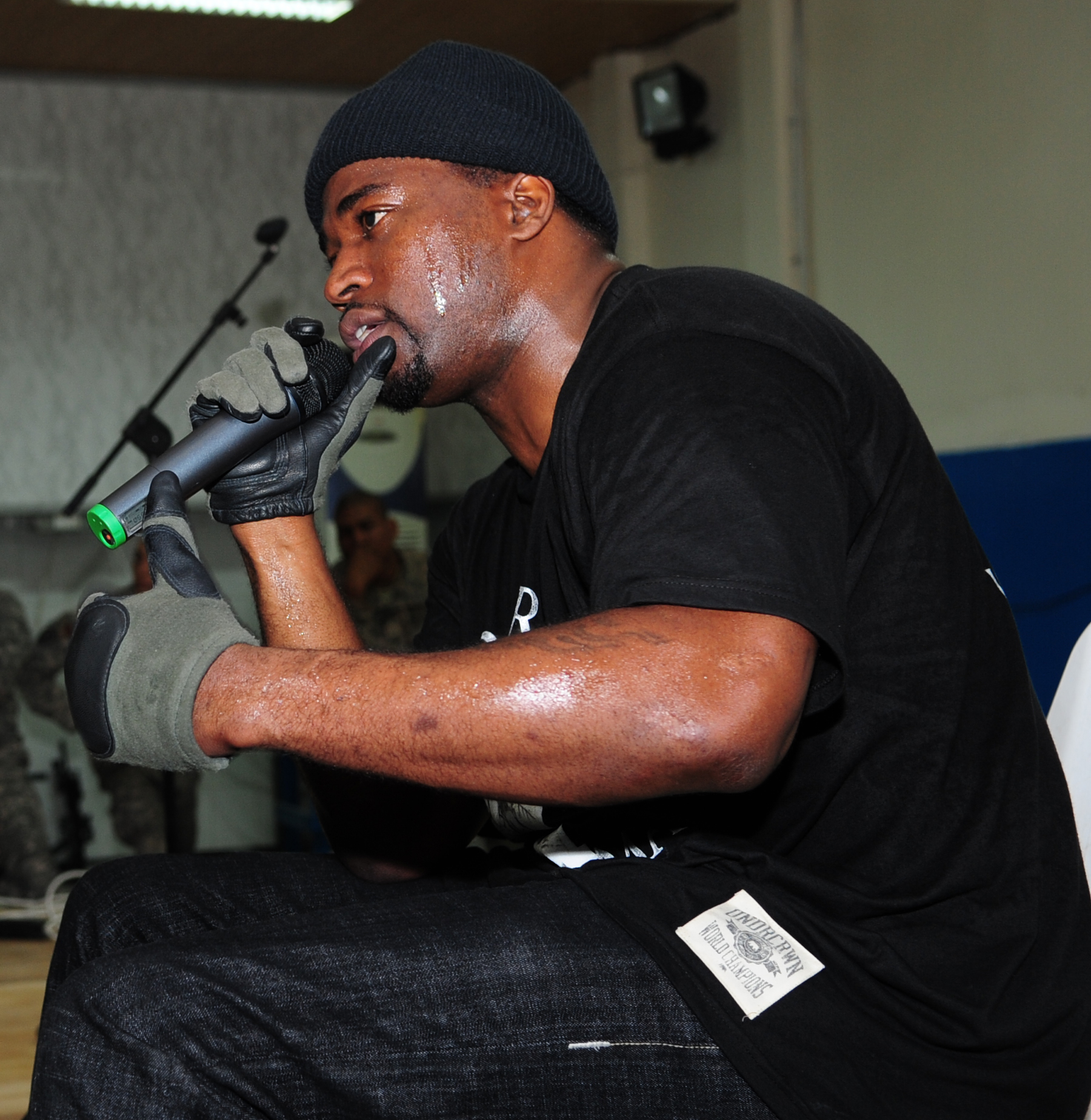
According to Banner, the title came from a discussion "about the death of contemporary music".

The title was decided during a conversation between both artists about the troubled state of the music industry, with 9th holding the view that contemporary artists could not attain the same iconic heights as those of an earlier era. "We were just talking about the death of contemporary music," Banner recounted. "How have we continued to let music go in the direction that it is? It's almost impossible for there to be another Michael Jackson or Usher or Chris Brown. And 9th said 'Damn! That's what we should call it. Death of a Pop Star.' " Although the title's significance can simply be interpreted as the death of being a pop star, the Mississippian insisted that it was chosen to spark a discussion among listeners about not only the album but also the death of contemporary black music.

In regards to the demise of black music, 9th clarified that the presence of soul music, in particular, has diminished in mainstream media. "Not to say black music is dead all the way, but on the mainstream side there's not really much of a focus on soul. There's not a lot of people trying to redefine soul music. It's a situation that we wanted to address and put out in the mainstream arena."

Both artists felt that music in general has been depreciated by the emphasis on style to the detriment of substance. "9th Wonder is probably one of the most soulful [producers] in our generation," told Banner. "Death of a Pop Star is needed for a balance in the music landscape right now, just like 2 Live Crew and A Tribe Called Quest were once needed at the same time." Moreover, Banner observed that the increasing popularity of downloads has devalued music. "People just look at music as a download. But what they don't understand is when you get a Lil Wayne on your album, you have to pay for Wayne and [...] get that money back. If you are not able to push units like a Michael [Jackson] or an Usher, how will you be able to possess the power to really move the masses of people? That's where the power comes in to renegotiate your recording contract; that's where you have the power to not only move things musically, but [also] socially."

== Recording and production ==
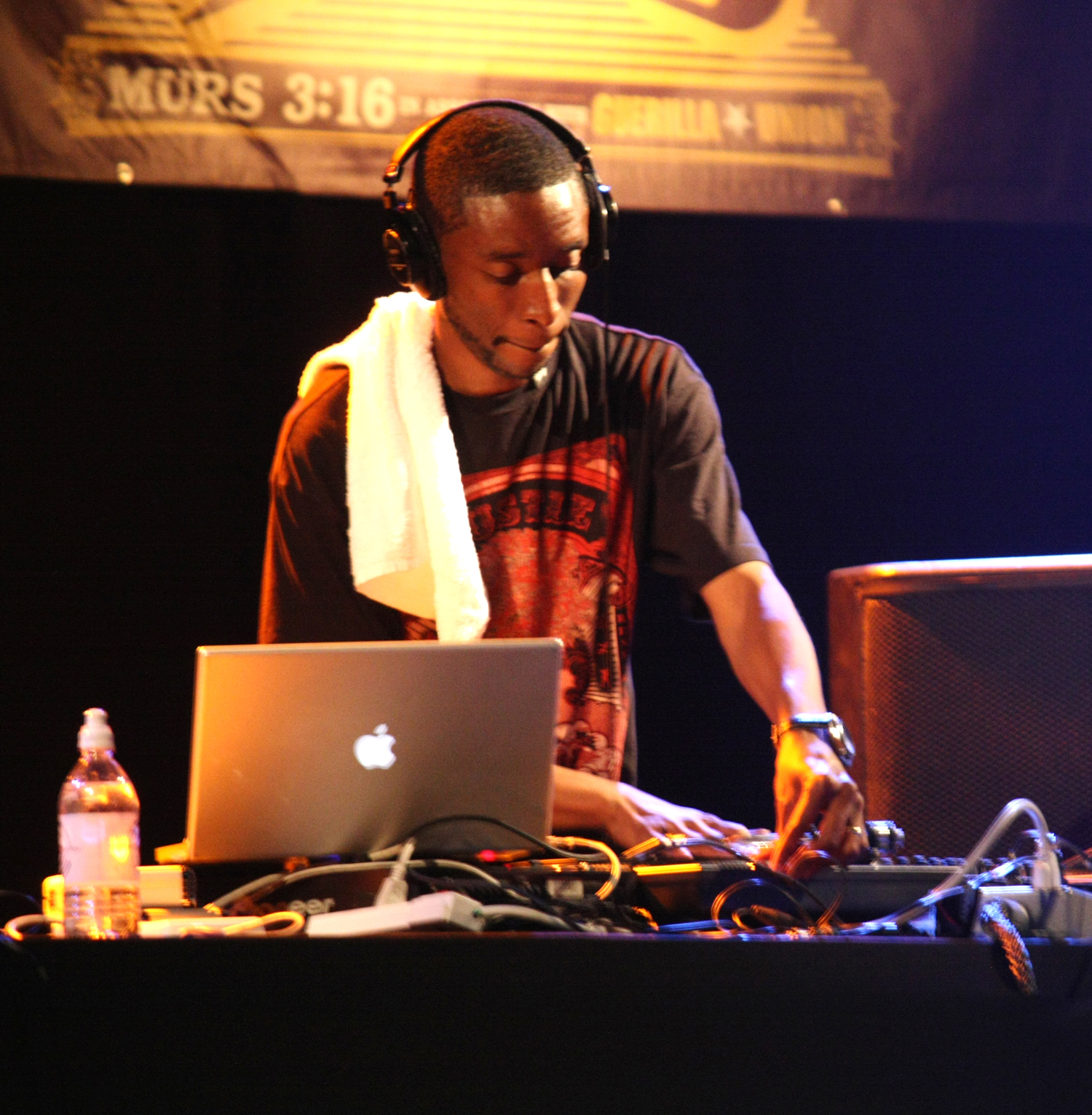
9th Wonder was the main producer

The recording sessions for Death of a Pop Star took place from 2009 to 2010 at Bright Lady Studios in Raleigh, North Carolina and Premier Studios in New York City. Primarily produced by 9th Wonder, the ten-track album was mixed by Neal Pogue and Pat Viala. David Banner provided additional production, along with Chris "THX" Goodman for Banner Beats, Warryn Campbell for The Machine, and E. Jones—a lead producer of 9th Wonder's production team, The Soul Council—who also produced "The Light", the sole track without input from Wonder. Live instrumentation is provided by Kevin Williams (flutes), Dontae Winslow (horns), E. Jones (keyboards), THX (keyboards), Warryn Campbell (bass, live drums, keyboards and piano), and David Banner as well (keyboards). The endeavor also includes additional vocals from Melodye Perry, Carlos Ricketts, and Joi Starr.

Initially, the two artists intended to release their joint project as a free mixtape; however, as the sessions exceeded expectations, they changed their mind. 9th Wonder explained, "When we did the first three songs, we were like, 'Man, we ain't giving this jam away.' It was like, 'Man, this is really some good music.' Then about four or five [songs] in, we were like, 'Oh boy, we can't give this away.' " Subsequently, the pair decided to develop their project into a full-length album, recording more songs than the final ten.

The live instrumentation on the album is a departure from 9th Wonder's usual sample-based production. Several tracks had to be replayed due to legal issues on using samples, which Banner regards have subdued the album's "true resonance".

== Release ==
Death of a Pop Star was originally scheduled to be released on December 29, 2009, as a free album. In October 2009, David Banner and 9th Wonder announced they would be setting up a website to accept donations toward the cost of producing the album, with half of the proceeds to be given to a non-profit organization. However, when both artists decided to turn the project into a full-length album, its release was delayed, first to summer 2010, then to November 7, 2010. Three days prior to the November release date a distribution deal with eOne Music was set up, and the album was rescheduled for release on December 21, 2010.

== Promotion ==
In April 2009, before an official announcement of the collaboration had been made public, 2DOPEBOYZ mentioned a track they called ""Channel 3" or "No Denyin'"", and provided a download link. On October 5, 2009, in the wake of the murder of Derrion Albert, the track "Something Is Wrong" was posted on the Okayplayer website with the comment that it: "touches on issues like the murder of Derrion Albert, Obama, and homosexuality". In October, Banner's Heal the Hood Foundation and 247HH.com partnered with MTV and enlisted the help of local celebrities and artists, along with MTV host Sway Calloway, to raise awareness of violence among urban youth throughout Chicago by organizing an Anti-Violence rally. The rally was used in the video shoot of the remix of "Something Is Wrong" which included performances from Naledge, Twista, Rhymefest and Skooda Chose. However, due to an increase in the anticipated number of attendees and resulting safety concerns, the event was postponed to mid-November.

Following the release of the lead single, "Slow Down", the album closer, "Strange", was leaked online on March 11, 2010. The song features North Carolina-based rapper Big Remo, who at the time was signed under 9th Wonder's independent record label, Jamla.

Shortly prior to the album's release, the duo unveiled two more tracks: "Mas 4" on December 2, 2010, and "Silly" on December 17, 2010. The latter track opens with 9th Wonder's lone rap performance on the album (under his rapping alter-ego 9thmatic), and features a chorus from Grammy-winning singer-songwriter Erykah Badu.

On January 19, 2010, David Banner published on YouTube a teaser for the album. The teaser features a scrolling text explaining the album's context, with the album opener, "Diamonds on My Pinky", playing in the background. The text reads as follows:

There is always life after death... this applies to science, spirituality & literature. Neither the agnostic man, the religious man, nor the philosopher can deny that science, religious dogma and literary works are entrenched in the notion, that there is a rebirth and new life gained from death. The album title "Death Of A Pop Star" is a bold open-ended headline, that can be interpreted however anyone chooses, but you must give the album a thoughtful and introspective listen. We hope the spirit of positive energy, which inspired this collaborative effort will renew and uplift people from all walks of life.

On June 26, 2010, Hot 97 radio personality Peter Rosenberg hosted a special event called An Evening With... to interview the two emcee-producers, take questions from the audience, and preview music from the album, similar in format to James Lipton's Inside the Actors Studio show. The event was open to the public and approximately fifty fans were granted entry on a first-come, first-served basis. OKPTV was also present to cover the event as well as get their own Q&A session in which the two artists addressed their partnership and how it came about, among other topics. The event took place at 92YTribeca in New York City.

== Multimedia ==
=== Comic strip ===
The first episode of the Death of a Pop Star webcomic strip

The pair's intention was to make Death of a Pop Star a multimedia promotion; as part of that scheme, on 10 December 2010, they launched a webcomic strip on the website, deathofapopstar.com. "The idea with Death of a Pop Star was never for it to be only an album," Banner explained. "The aim of this project was to engage the consumer on many different levels. With the music industry being in the state it's in, we as artists need to provide as much intriguing content as possible for our fans. This is the second step in exposing the Death of a Pop Star project on many different platforms." According to 9th, "[c]omics, sneakers, and hip-hop have always been close-knit with each other for years and years. This comic strip will show you exactly how close the relationships between those entities are." The strip, bearing the same title as the album, centered around both men "living in the real world with superhuman powers". The press release announced that while "9th Wonder's character struggles with inner conflict, discipline and violence, David Banner's character must rise from an impoverished neighborhood, while following a higher calling."

=== PlayStation 3 theme ===
Increasing the promotional efforts surrounding their album, the duo partnered with Konsole Kingz—an Atlanta-based company that combines hip-hop with gaming—to design an album-inspired theme exclusively for PlayStation 3. The dynamic theme was made available at the PlayStation Store for free in January 2011. Upon downloading the package, gamers could personalize their console's general interface (XMB) with six backgrounds and custom sounds produced by Banner and 9th as well as the Konsole Kingz silver icon pack. "As technology evolves, so must the role of the artist in peoples lives. Death of a Pop Star was always designed to be bigger than just music," said Banner. "With the help of the people at Konsole Kingz, we have been able to further expand the Death of a Pop Star experience."

Along the same vein, 9th Wonder shared that the purpose of the giveaway is to share their music with a wider audience. "We must understand that everyone discovers music differently. The radio is not the only place that you can decide to become a part of a musical experience. Gaming is a huge part of our culture, more than ever." He continued, "Having a game introduce Death of a Pop Star to someone falls directly in line with our mission statement with this album; be different and revolutionary."

== Singles ==
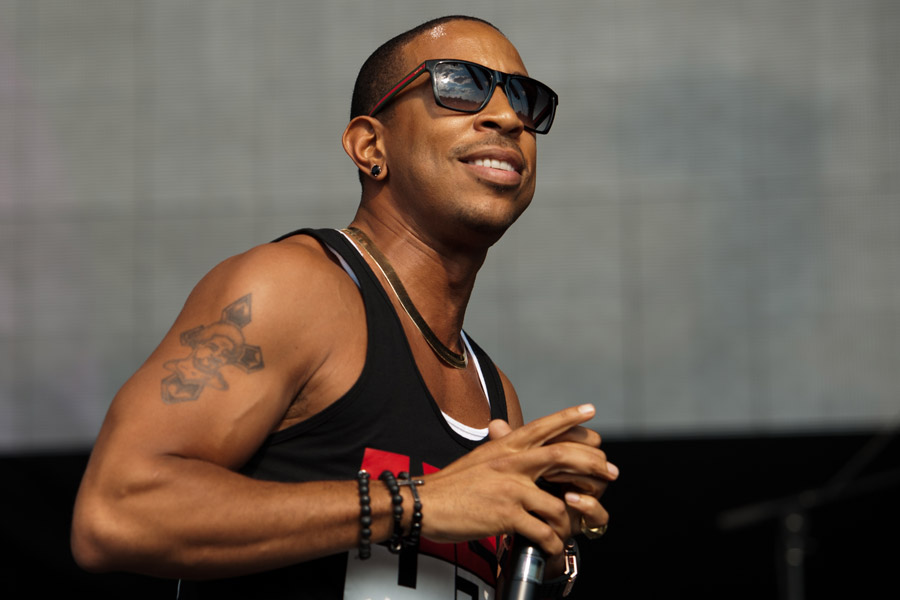
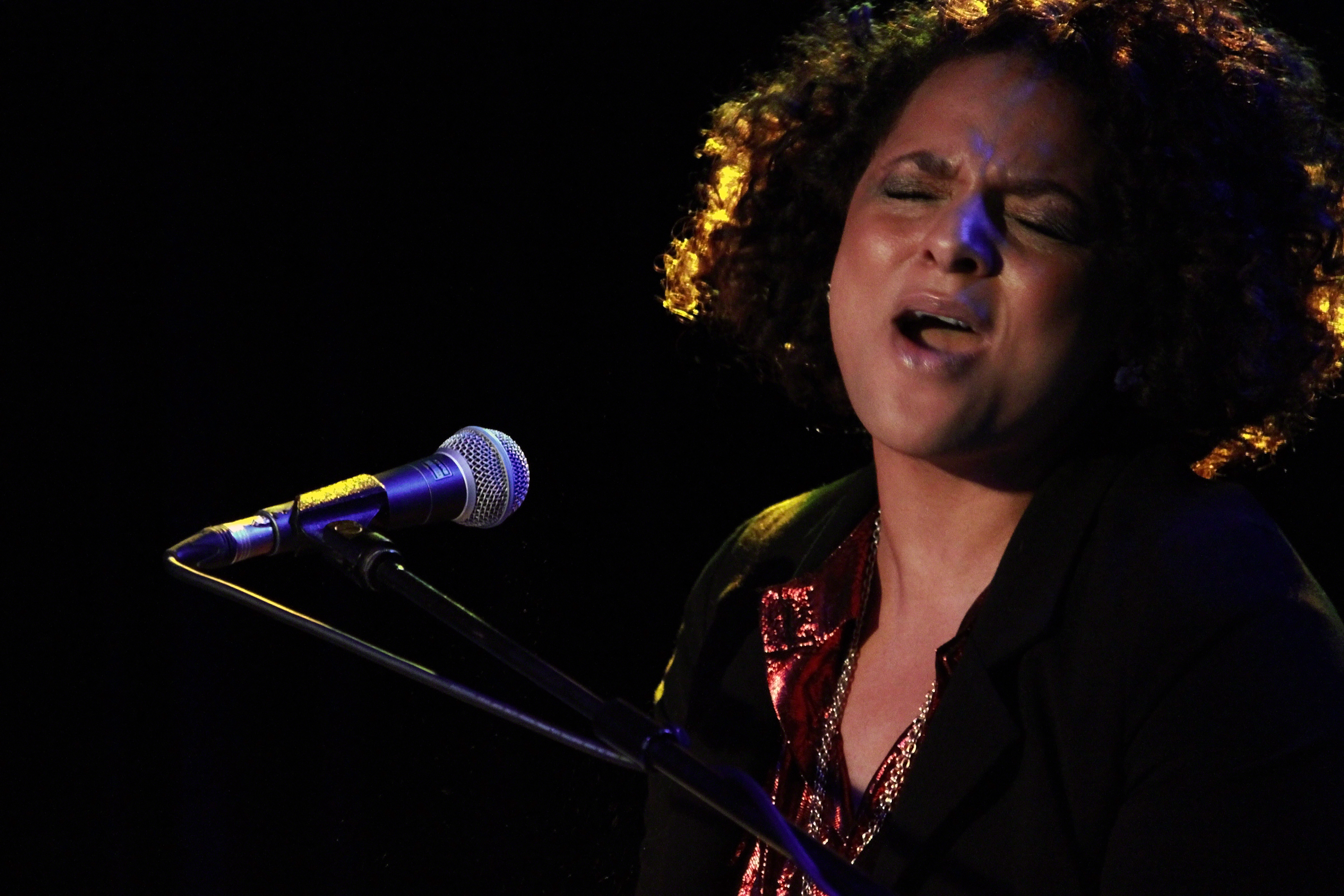
Ludacris (top) and Marsha Ambrosius (bottom) both worked with the duo on "Be With You".

The album's lead single, "Slow Down" featuring Jamla signee Heather Victoria, was leaked onto the Internet on January 21, 2010, and its music video premiered on June 21, 2010. Illusive Media and David Banner directed the video with a theme loosely based on John Carpenter's 1988 cult classic, They Live, which starred Roddy Piper and Keith David. On November 19, 2010, the album's version of the song was made purchasable. The album's rendition differs from the original leaked version, produced solely by 9th Wonder. The original contains a sample of "On Impact" as performed by The Whispers. Due to sample clearance issues, 9th, Banner and Warryn Campbell reproduced the song, and the sample's vocals were resung by Melodye Perry.

The second single, "Be With You", featuring rapper Ludacris and singer Marsha Ambrosius, was released on November 3, 2010, and made purchasable twenty days later. The song spent thirteen weeks on the US Billboard Hot R&B/Hip-Hop Songs, on which it peaked at number 44. The song is David Banner's first single to appear on the Hot R&B/Hip-Hop Songs chart after more than two years. The music video, directed by Mr. Boomtown, premiered on December 16, 2010, on MTV. On January 2, 2014, it was reported by TMZ that David Banner, Ludacris and Marsha Ambrosius received a copyright infringement lawsuit over allegedly using a sample of late soul singer Tyrone Davis' 1979 ballad, "Be With Me", without consent. Banner was sued by the song's producer and publishing company, who claim that the rapper-producer illegally sampled Davis' tune on "Be With You". Ludacris and Marsha are mentioned in the lawsuit due to their appearance on the song. Although unconfirmed by TMZ, 9th Wonder and co-producer Warryn Campbell are likely to have been implicated in the case as well.

== Reception ==
Death of a Pop Star debuted at number 17 on the Billboard Top Rap Albums chart, selling 7,300 copies in its first week of release. It entered at number 41 on the Top R&B/Hip-Hop Albums chart, as well as the Top Independent Albums chart at number 14.

Death of a Pop Star opened up to generally favorable reviews from critics. Justin Hunte, former editor-in-chief of HipHopDX, hailed Death of a Pop Star as David Banner's best and "most digestible" work to date and 9th Wonder's "most complete pet project" since his 2006 Murray's Revenge collaboration with rapper Murs. He further commented that the brevity of the album "is balanced by a high quality collection of songs screaming replay value throughout". USA Today critic Steve Jones considered that 9th Wonder's soulful production provided a "compelling backdrop for Banner's pointed lyrics", and felt that the guest artists supplied "potent contributions". Emanuel Wallace of RapReviews found that the production "works exceptionally well with Banner's oftentimes aggressive flow", but continued that his "biggest gripe would have to be the brevity of the album".

Jermaine Dobbins, writing for SoulCulture, observed that "[t]hose who remember the rapper's more explicit work such as 'Like a Pimp' or 'Play' would be forgiven for not [recognizing] this as the same man. The raspy Southern drawl has been replaced by a clearer and enunciated voice that Banner effectively uses to teach, admonish and entertain with equal aplomb." In spite of the seemingly odd pairing of the two artists, David Jeffries, reviewing for AllMusic, heard "a great chemistry" between them. He felt that 9th Wonder's soulful production was "top-notch", though Banner was "the real attraction" for presenting himself as "a more layered and complicated artist" than showcased on previous works. Yet, he noted that "while [the album is] sold as a conceptual piece inspired by the end of music industry, it does go off topic without warning."

In a mixed review for Pitchfork, Jess Harvell panned the lyrics, labeling them "a mess", and criticized the album for being "heavy on drippy love raps", and for having "dumbly repetitive hooks" and "beats suspiciously lacking in thump-value". Furthermore, he opined that "[t]here are moments throughout Death of a Pop Star that suggest the better album that might have resulted with a little more focus and intensity", and deemed Banner "too odd and talented, too much his own man, to wind up an also-ran in hip-hop history". According to Wilson McBee of Prefix Magazine, the album's weaknesses are "partially due to sequencing"; explaining that, "The record starts with blistering battle-rhyming, retreats into tepid alt-rap, and finishes with melancholy social critique." In addition, McBee thought both artists could perhaps have "improved the album by weaving these thematic threads rather than separating them".

== Track listing ==
No.	Title	Writer(s)	Producer(s)	Length
1.	"Diamonds on My Pinky"	Lavell Crump; Patrick Douthit; Chris Goodman	9th Wonder; David Banner*; THX*	2:19
2.	"No Denying (Channel 3)"	Crump; Douthit; Warryn Campbell	9th Wonder; David Banner*; Campbell*	2:13
3.	"Mas 4"	Crump; Douthit	9th Wonder	1:20
4.	"The Light"	Crump; Eric Jones	E. Jones	4:18
5.	"Slow Down" (featuring Heather Victoria)	Crump; Douthit; Campbell; Heather Victoria	9th Wonder; David Banner*; Campbell*	3:20
6.	"Be With You" (featuring Ludacris and Marsha Ambrosius)	Crump; Douthit; Campbell; Marsha Ambrosius; Christopher Bridges	9th Wonder; David Banner*; Campbell*	3:21
7.	"Stutter" (featuring Anthony Hamilton)	Crump; Douthit; Campbell; Anthony Hamilton	9th Wonder; David Banner*; Campbell*	3:25
8.	"Silly" (featuring Erykah Badu)	Crump; Douthit; Goodman; Erica Wright	9th Wonder; David Banner*; THX*	2:08
9.	"Something Is Wrong" (featuring Lisa Ivey)	Crump; Douthit; Campbell	9th Wonder; David Banner*; Campbell*	3:49
10.	"Strange" (featuring Big Remo)	Crump; Douthit; Campbell; Remo	9th Wonder; David Banner*; E. Jones*; Campbell*	4:21
Total length:				30:34

Best Buy bonus tracks
No.	Title	Producer(s)	Length
11.	"Love Me Down"	9th Wonder	4:20
12.	"Hip-Hop" (featuring Mars)	9th Wonder	3:26
13.	"Mas (Remix)"	David Banner	1:23
Total length:			39:43

• (*) designates additional production

Notes

- "Diamonds on My Pinky" features additional vocals from Carlos Ricketts, and keys by David Banner and THX.
- "No Denying (Channel 3)" features additional vocals from Melodye Perry, bass and piano by Warryn Campbell.
- "Slow Down" features additional vocals from Melodye Perry.
- "Be With You" features keys by Warryn Campbell and E. Jones, horns by Dontae Winslow and flutes by Kevin Williams.
- "Stutter" features additional vocals from Joi Starr.
- "Silly" features rap vocals from 9th Wonder as 9thmatic, additional vocals from Joi Starr and horns by Dontae Winslow.
- "Strange" features flutes by Kevin Williams and live drums by Warryn Campbell.

== Personnel ==
Credits for Death of a Pop Star adapted from the album liner notes and AllMusic.

Musical personnel

- Lavell "David Banner" Crump – primary artist, additional production, keyboards, rap vocals
- Patrick "9th Wonder" Douthit – primary artist, producer
- Marsha Ambrosius – featured artist
- Christopher "Ludacris" Bridges – featured artist
- Warryn Campbell – additional production, bass, composer, drums, keyboards, piano
- Anthony Hamilton – featured artist
- Eric "E. Jones" Jones – additional production, keyboards, producer
- Melodye Perry – additional vocals
- Carlos Ricketts – additional vocals
- Big Remo – featured artist
- Joi Starr – additional vocals
- Chris "THX" Goodman – additional production, keyboards
- Heather Victoria – composer, featured artist
- Kevin Williams – flute
- Dontae Winslow – horn
- Erica "Erykah Badu" Wright – featured artist

Technical personnel

- 1500 Studios – engineer
- Bruce Buechner – engineer
- Lavell Crump – executive producer
- Anthony Daniels – engineer
- Hector Delgato – studio
- Patrick Douthit – engineer
- Paul Grosso – additional design
- Eric Jones – engineer
- Annette Navarro – art direction, design, photography
- Neal Pogue – mixing
- Crush Republic – artwork collaboration
- Samantha Selolwane – associate producer
- Corey Smyth – associate producer
- Pat Viala – mixing

== Chart positions ==
Chart (2010)	Peak position
US Top Independent Albums (Billboard)	14
US Top R&B/Hip-Hop Albums (Billboard)	41
US Top Rap Albums (Billboard)	17
