= Grey Skies =

Studio album by Crooked Lettaz
- Released: April 20, 1999
- Recorded: 1998–1999
- Studio: Wendy's Crib; DARP Studios (Atlanta, GA); The Cutting Room (New York, NY); Fly Productions; Momma's House (Chicago, IL); United Technique Recording (Chicago, IL); Freddie Young's Spot (Jackson, MS); Tiger Traxx (Jackson, MS); Platinum Island Studios (New York, NY); Terminal Studios (Jackson, MS)
- Genre: Hip hop
- Length: 1:05:38
- Label: Penalty
- Producer: Andy C; David Banner; Gensu Dean; Pimp C

David Banner chronology
Grey Skies (1999)	Them Firewater Boyz, Vol. 1 (2000)

Kamikaze chronology
Grey Skies (1999)	Firewater Boy #2 (2001)

Singles from Grey Skies
- 1. "Firewater/Get Crunk" Released: March 9, 1999

Professional ratings
Review scores
Source	Rating
AllMusic	3/5 stars
RapReviews	8/10
The Source	3.5/5 stars

Grey Skies is the only studio album by American hip hop group Crooked Lettaz. It was released on April 20, 1999, via Penalty Recordings. Production was handled by David Banner, Gensu Dean, Andy C and Pimp C. It features guest appearances from Aliou Diallo, Budz, J Da Groova, N.O.R.E., Pimp C, and Dirrt's Us. In the United States, the album peaked at number 75 on the Top R&B/Hip-Hop Albums chart.

The album was supported with a 1998 promotional single "Caught Up In The Game" and a 1999 single "Firewater" b/w "Get Crunk".

Despite Crooked Lettaz's disbandment in early 2000s, members Kamikaze and David Banner would occasionally reuniting on various solo projects.

== Track listing ==
No.	Title	Writer(s)	Producer(s)	Length
1.	"Mama Lena Intro"		David Banner	0:45
2.	"Get Crunk" (featuring Pimp C)	Lavell Crump; Brad Franklin; Chad Butler; Larry Smith; Darryl McDaniels; Joseph Simmons	Pimp C	4:23
3.	"Fire Water" (featuring Noreaga)	Crump; Franklin; Victor Santiago; Robert E. Bell; Ronald N. Bell; George Brown; Gene Redd; Robert Mickens; Claydes Smith; Woody Sparrow; Dennis Thomas; Richard Westfield; Robin Williamson	David Banner	4:37
4.	"South's on My Mind"	Crump; Franklin	David Banner	4:09
5.	"Chicken and Swine" (featuring J Da Groova)	Crump; Franklin; J. Martin; Andy Craemer	Andy C.	3:59
6.	"Straight Outta Africa" (featuring Aliou Diallo)	Aliou Diallo	David Banner	1:28
7.	"Daydreamin'"	Crump; Franklin; Thomas Randolph Bell; William Hart; Raymon Murray; Cameron Gipp; Antwan Patton; Patrick Brown; Rico Wade; Frederick Bell	David Banner	4:05
8.	"A Girl Named Cim"	Crump; Franklin	David Banner	4:18
9.	"It's Ours" (featuring Us)	Crump; Franklin; J. Windom; D. Cross	David Banner	3:43
10.	"Tupelo"	Crump; Franklin	David Banner	4:43
11.	"Trill"	Crump; Franklin	David Banner; Timothy Deal (co.)	6:14
12.	"Pimp Shit" (featuring Budz)	Crump; Franklin; A. Cook; Craemer; Douglas Fontaine Brown	Andy C.	4:25
13.	"Grey Skies"	Crump; Franklin; Eddie Alexander	Gensu Dean	4:24
14.	"Brad's Interlude"		Gensu Dean	0:46
15.	"Caught in the Game"	Crump; Franklin; Alexander	Gensu Dean; David Banner (co.)	4:12
16.	"I Know"	Crump; Franklin	David Banner	4:45
17.	"Outro"		David Banner	4:43
Total length:				1:05:38

Sample credits

- Track 2 contains replay elements of "Rockbox" written by Larry Smith, Darryl McDaniels and Joseph Simmons.
- Track 3 contains elements of "Let the Music Take Your Mind" written by Robert E. Bell, Ronald N. Bell, George Brown, Gene Redd, Robert Mickens, Claydes Smith, Woody Sparrow, Dennis Thomas and Richard Westfield and performed by Kool & the Gang and a sample of "Gwydion's Dream" written and performed by Robin Williamson.
- Track 7 contains re-played elements of "Didn't I (Blow Your Mind This Time)" written by Thomas Randolph Bell and William Hart and elements from "Dirty South" written by Raymon Murray, Cameron Gipp, Antwan Patton, Patrick Brown, Rico Wade and Frederick Bell and performed by Goodie Mob.
- Track 12 contains elements from "Heat Down in the Alley" written by Douglas Fontaine Brown and performed by Southwind.

== Personnel ==
- Lavell "David Banner" Crump – vocals, producer (tracks: 1, 3, 4, 6–11, 16, 17), co-producer (track 15), recording (track 1), executive producer
- Brad "Kamikaze" Franklin – vocals, executive producer
- DJ Phinga Print – scratches, executive producer
- Chad "Pimp C" Butler – vocals & producer (track 2)
- Victor "Noreaga" Santiago – vocals (track 3)
- Daphne Mitchell – additional vocals (track 4)
- J. "J Da Groova" Martin – vocals (track 5)
- Aliou Diallo – vocals (track 6)
- J. Windom – vocals (track 9)
- D. Cross – vocals (track 9)
- Avon Marshall – background vocals (track 10), keyboards (tracks: 4, 10, 16)
- Kandii Saje – background vocals (track 11)
- A. "Budz" Cook – vocals (track 12)
- Jeff Davidson – guitar (tracks: 4, 16), bass (track 16), keyboards (track 17)
- Artie Reynolds – bass (track 4)
- Andy Craemer – keyboards (track 5), producer & engineering (tracks: 5, 12)
- Dale Morris – bass (track 10), recording (tracks: 8, 10, 16)
- Timothy Deal – keyboards & co-producer (track 11)
- Eddie "Gensu Dean" Alexander – producer (tracks: 13–15)
- Kevin Crouse – recording (tracks: 2, 6), mixing (tracks: 1–4, 6, 7, 10, 11, 16)
- Nastee – recording (tracks: 3, 9)
- Freddie Young – recording (tracks: 4, 7)
- Rae Nimeh – recording & mixing (tracks: 5, 12)
- Shawn Mackie – recording (track 13)
- Devon Kirkpatrick – recording (track 14)
- Won Bee – recording & mixing (track 17)
- Joe Quinde – mixing (track 8)
- Patrick Viala – mixing (track 9)
- D'Anthony Johnson – mixing (tracks: 13, 14)
- Michael Sarsfield – mastering
- Edwin Holmes – production coordinator
- Julian Alexander – art direction
- Daniel Hastings – photography
- Mayhem – A&R direction
- Karen Zweig – A&R administration
- Geno Sims – A&R coordination
- Carolyn Williams – management

== Charts ==
Chart (1999)	Peak position
US Top R&B/Hip-Hop Albums (Billboard)	75
