= Neil Levine =

American music industry executive

- Genres: Hip hop music
- Occupation: Record executive
- Years active: 1989–present
- Labels: Penalty, TVT, Imperial, Sony, Battery, Capitol

Neil Levine is an American music industry executive. He is best known as the founder of the hip-hop label Penalty Recordings, and is currently the CEO of its successor company, Penalty Entertainment. Levine helped to launch the careers of artists such as Capone-N-Noreaga, Lil Jon & the East Side Boyz, and Tha Eastsidaz.

== Biography ==
=== Early years and Penalty Recordings ===
Levine graduated from Berklee College of Music in Boston with a degree in music composition and saxophone. He began his work in the music industry as a session player, later becoming an independent marketing professional. Levine founded the marketing company Round the Globe Music in the late 1980s in order to promote and market hip-hop music. Round the Globe offered street teaming and retail/video/radio promotions and was influential in the success of the records of artists such as A Tribe Called Quest and Mariah Carey, among others.

In 1995, Levine launched Penalty Recordings, which operated as a joint venture between himself and Tommy Boy Records, founded by Tom Silverman. Tommy Boy, at the time, was fully owned by Warner Bros. Records, and Silverman reacquired half of Tommy Boy in 1996 not long after the Penalty deal.

Penalty's initial releases included singles and albums by artists such as Lord Finesse and Capone-N-Noreaga. Other artists on the label during the mid-to-late 1990s included Skull Duggery, Crooked Lettaz (David Banner and Kamikaze), and Half a Mill.

After Tom Silverman bought half of Tommy Boy back from Warner Bros. Records in 1996, it continued as Penalty's distributor. The label saw two of its most successful releases in with Noreaga's first two solo albums, N.O.R.E. (1998) and Melvin Flynt – Da Hustler (1999), the former of which launched the hit single "Superthug", one of the earliest hits produced by The Neptunes (Pharrell Williams and Chad Hugo).

=== A&R and executive work ===
Levine sold his 50% interest in Penalty to Tom Silverman and Tommy Boy in 1999, and became the Vice-President of Urban Marketing and Artist Development at the independent label TVT Records. In this capacity, Levine worked with established act Naughty by Nature, and helped develop the careers of Lil Jon & the East Side Boyz and Snoop Dogg's Dogghouse Records artists, including associates Tha Eastsidaz.

He re-established Penalty in 2002 as Penalty Associated Labels, which became a joint venture with Ryko Distribution, a company for which Levine would also serve as the general manager of. Artists signed to the Penalty labels at this time included MC Eiht, The Beatnuts, and Ali Shaheed Muhammad (A Tribe Called Quest), and Penalty also struck a deal to produce and market the AND1 Mixtape series.

In 2006, Levine was hired by EMI Music, where he worked as the head of Imperial Records and later the head of the urban division at EMI's Capitol Records. While at Imperial, Levine oversaw the creation of Fat Joe's seventh studio album, Me, Myself & I. Two years later, he moved to Sony BMG, where he served as an A&R executive for Jive Records and the head of the newly formed BMG imprint Battery Records.

Deciding to go back to running his own label, Levine established Penalty Entertainment in 2014, re-signing Capone-N-Noreaga to a new deal, and striking deals with established artists such as Trina, Joell Ortiz, eMC, Statik Selektah, and KXNG Crooked (a.k.a. Crooked I) and new artists such as BeatKing and Hi-Rez. In 2022, Levine launched a management company, Home Club Management. As of 2023, Levine is an adjunct professor teaching music business at NYU Steinhardt and Marymount Manhattan College.

== See also ==
- Penalty Recordings
- Capone-N-Noreaga
