= Fornever (Murs & 9th Wonder album) =

Studio album by Murs and 9th Wonder
- Released: April 13, 2010
- Studio: Purple Reign Studios (Inglewood, CA)
- Genre: Hip-hop
- Length: 41:58
- Label: SMC Recordings
- Producer: 9th Wonder

Murs and 9th Wonder chronology
Sweet Lord (2008)	Fornever (2010)	The Final Adventure (2012)

Murs chronology
Murs for President (2008)	Fornever (2010)	The Final Adventure (2012)

9th Wonder chronology
The Corner of Spec & 9th (2008)	Fornever (2010)	Death of a Pop Star (2010)

Fornever is the fourth collaborative studio album by Californian rapper Murs and hip-hop producer 9th Wonder. It was released on April 13, 2010, via SMC Recordings. Recording sessions took place at Purple Reign Studios in Inglewood. Produced entirely by 9th Wonder, it features guest appearances from Kurupt, Sick Jacken, Suga Free, Uncle Chucc, Verbs and Justin Keitt. The album peaked at number 87 on the Billboard 200, number 22 on the Top R&B/Hip-Hop Albums, and number 9 on both the Top Rap Albums and the Independent Albums charts in the United States.

== Critical reception ==
Professional ratings
Aggregate scores
Source	Rating
Metacritic	72/100
Review scores
Source	Rating
AllMusic	4/5 stars
Alternative Press	3.5/5 stars
Billboard	3.5/5 stars
Consequence of Sound	F
HipHopDX	3.5/5
Los Angeles Times	3/4 stars
Pitchfork	6.1/10
PopMatters	5/10 medals
The A.V. Club	B+

Fornever was met with generally favorable reviews from music critics. At Metacritic, which assigns a normalized rating out of 100 to reviews from mainstream publications, the album received an average score of 72 based on seven reviews.

Nathan Rabin of The A.V. Club praised the album, stating: "on Fornever, the fourth collaborative album by MURS and producer 9th Wonder, the duo is smart enough not to tinker with a winning formula". AllMusic's Jason Lymangrover called the album "one of those rare, late-career triumphs", continuing "there are no weak tracks and it's entertaining throughout; every bit as much as Murs' best early outings". Jeff Weiss of Los Angeles Times wrote: "ultimately, Fornever, might not be their most indelible achievement, but with cookout season approaching, 9th Wonder and Murs have created a worthy soundtrack for the Southern California spring". Eddie Fleisher of Alternative Press stated: "though fans may expect these collaborations to be less structured than a MURS solo record, there's a few songs that just leave you feeling unsatisfied. That being said, Fornever is still a solid disc, and will please the average indie-rap fan". Evan J. Nabavian of Billboard concluded: "the 10-track set, which contains multiple sounds and styles, gives a brief glimpse into both artists' scattered versatility". Zach Kelly of Pitchfork wrote: "most of the songs are toss-offs, but it's plenty of fun to be along for the ride as long as some restraint is issued. Without it, ForNever alternately struggles to keep its head above water with washed-out cautionary tales ("The Problem Is...") or slums it in the shallows with mildly tawdry goofs ("Asian Girl")".

In his mixed review for PopMatters, Saxon Baird resumed: "Fornever is an improvement from Murs' last album, but not by much. His topics have been worn out, his lyrics are less creative, and where he once owned the mic with confidence through emotional highs and lows, Murs seems sluggish as he anxiously raps about the same shit we've heard from him time and time again".

== Track listing ==
No.	Title	Writer(s)	Length
1.	"Fornever" (featuring Kurupt)	Nicholas Carter; Ricardo Brown; Patrick Douthit	3:38
2.	"The Lick" (featuring VerBS)	Carter; Kyle Guy; Douthit	3:45
3.	"Asian Girl"	Carter; Douthit; Eric Jones	3:37
4.	"Let Me Talk" (featuring Suga Free)	Carter; Dejuan Rice; Douthit	4:22
5.	"Cigarettes and Liquor"	Carter; Douthit	4:16
6.	"Vikki Veil"	Carter; Douthit	3:32
7.	"I Used to Love Her (Again)"	Carter; Douthit	6:17
8.	"The Problem Is..." (featuring Sick Jacken and Uncle Chucc)	Carter; Jack Gonzalez; Charles Hamilton; Douthit	3:38
9.	"West Coast Cinderella"	Carter; Douthit	3:52
10.	"Live from Roscoe's" (featuring Kurupt)	Carter; Brown; Douthit	5:03
Total length:			41:58

== Personnel ==
- Nick "Murs" Carter – vocals, arranger, executive producer
- Ricardo "Kurupt" Brown – vocals (tracks: 1, 10)
- Kyle "VerBs" Guy – vocals (track 2)
- Dejuan "Suga Free" Walker – vocals (track 4)
- Jack "Sick Jacken" Gonzalez – vocals (track 8)
- Charles "Uncle Chucc" Hamilton – vocals (track 8)
- Justin "Kanobby" Keitt – additional vocals (tracks: 6, 7, 9), recording, mixing
- Eric Jones – keyboards (tracks: 7–10)
- Gavin "Pretty Boy" Marchand – keyboards (tracks: 7–10)
- Patrick "9th Wonder" Douthit – producer, arranger, executive producer
- Terrace Martin – mastering
- Estevan Oriol – photography
- Lucky Alvarez – design, layout
- Justin Li – A&R

== Charts ==
Chart (2010)	Peak position
US Billboard 200	87
US Top R&B/Hip-Hop Albums (Billboard)	22
US Top Rap Albums (Billboard)	9
US Independent Albums (Billboard)	9
