= Certified (David Banner album) =

Studio album by David Banner
- Released: September 20, 2005
- Recorded: 2004–2005
- Studio: Stankonia (Atlanta, GA); Patchwerk Studios (Atlanta, GA); Sony Studios (New York, NY); Chi-Roc Studios (Chicago, IL); The Zone (Atlanta, GA); Warrior Studios (Brooklyn, NY); The Cutting Room Studios (New York, NY)
- Genre: Southern hip hop; gangsta rap; crunk; dirty rap
- Length: 1:08:35
- Label: SRC; Big Face; Universal
- Producer: Chris Flame; Cyber Sapp; David Banner; Downbeat Production Collective; Get Cool; Jazze Pha; Lil' Jon; Maestro; Mr. Collipark

David Banner chronology
MTA2: Baptized in Dirty Water (2003)	Certified (2005)	The Greatest Story Ever Told (2008)

Singles from Certified
- 1. "Play" Released: July 7, 2005; 2. "Touching" Released: January 10, 2006

Certified is the fourth studio album by American rapper and record producer David Banner. It was released on September 20, 2005 through Street Records Corporation, Big Face Entertainment and Universal Records.

Recording sessions took place at Stankonia Recording and PatchWerk Recording Studios and The Zone in Atlanta, Sony Music Studios, Warrior Studios and The Cutting Room Studios in New York and Chi-Roc Studios in Chicago.

Production was handled by Chris Flame, Cyber Sapp, Downbeat Production Collective, Get Cool, Jazze Pha, Lil' Jon, Maestro, Mr. Collipark, and David Banner himself, with Billy Hume, Craig Love, Jake Arnold, Kevin Rudolf and Mike Hartnett serving as co-producers.

It features guest appearances from Jazze Pha, Mr. Marcus, Skyy, 8Ball & MJG, B.G., Bun B, Case, dead prez, Grout, Jadakiss, Jagged Edge, Lil' Boosie, Magic, Talib Kweli, Three 6 Mafia, Too $hort and Twista, as well as his Crooked Lettaz cohort Kamikaze.

In the United States, the album debuted at number six on the Billboard 200, number three on the Top R&B/Hip-Hop Albums and number two on the Top Rap Albums charts. Its only single "Play" peaked at number seven on the US Billboard Hot 100 and number 96 on the UK singles chart. Music videos were released for "Play" and "Ain't Got Nothin'".

== Critical reception ==
Professional ratings
Aggregate scores
Source	Rating
Metacritic	71/100
Review scores
Source	Rating
AllMusic	4/5 stars
Entertainment Weekly	B−
musicOMH	2/5 stars
Okayplayer	2.5/5 stars
Pitchfork	8.4/10
PopMatters	8/10 stars
RapReviews	9/10
Stylus Magazine	B−
USA Today	3/4 stars
Vibe	3.5/5 stars

Certified garnered positive reviews from music critics who praised Banner's approach to over-the-top hip-hop stories and insightful political tracks. At Metacritic, which assigns a normalized rating out of 100 to reviews from mainstream critics, the album received an average score of 71, based on 13 reviews.

Pedro Hernandez of RapReviews gave high praise to Banner for building upon his previous material and delivered an album with solid production, balanced themes and capable guest artists, concluding that "Certified treads a fine line between keeping it real and selling units, but Banner treads that line very well. Though it is his best album to date, hopefully this is only the beginning for the game's most conscious rapper." AllMusic's Andy Kellman said that despite the cluttered list of guest artists, the record delivers on Banner's established material with higher production values and gusto conviction, saying that "Certified certifies that Banner is as crucial to hip-hop in the early 2000s as any other MC." Dan Nishimoto of PopMatters admired Banner's approach of crafting a mainstream hip-hop album that over-exaggerates tropes while delivering serious topics in disguise, saying that "Certified's appeal lies in this tightrope act. Fully aware of his captive audience, Banner goes for broke to bring in as wide a swath as possible."

Steve Jones of USA Today praised the album's balance of both political and sex-filled tracks, saying that "It's a mix that is certified to both educate and entertain." Evan McGarvey of Stylus Magazine was lukewarm on the record, finding the production and guest artists not at the level of Banner's vision at times but said that its still able to deliver its twisted empathy, saying that, "Certified is mostly a frightening album because it’s so clearly not up to Banner’s full potential but still a dramatic cut above almost everything else." Azeem Ahmad of musicOMH felt that the album was over-bloated with numerous songs that told the same inane stories over similar beats found in Lil Jon's discography, concluding that "There's little familiarity, too little to relate to on Certified, and I for one would rather give airtime to British talent than to try and push the likes of David Banner, whose music may be groundbreaking, but is alien to our ears."

== Track listing ==
No.	Title	Writer(s)	Producer(s)	Length
1.	"Lost Souls"	Lavell Crump; Skyler Synclair Keeton; Craig Love	David Banner; Craig Love (co.)	3:13
2.	"Treat Me Like" (featuring Jadakiss)	Crump; Jason Phillips; Jonathan Smith	Lil' Jon	3:53
3.	"Gangster Walk" (featuring Three 6 Mafia, Marcus, 8Ball & MJG)	Crump; Paul Beauregard; Jordan Houston; Marcus Williams; Premro Smith; Marlon Goodwin; Keldrick Sapp	Cyber Sapp	4:28
4.	"2 Fingers" (featuring Jagged Edge)	Crump; Brandon Casey	David Banner	3:29
5.	"Play"	Crump; Michael Crooms	Mr. Collipark	3:50
6.	"Fucking" (featuring Jazze Pha)	Crump; Phalon Alexander	Jazze Pha	3:51
7.	"Thinking of You" (featuring Case)	Crump; Case Woodard; Kevin Rudolf	David Banner; Kevin Rudolf (co.)	5:02
8.	"On Everything" (featuring Twista)	Crump; Carl Mitchell; Willie Poole; Nile Rodgers	Get Cool	4:09
9.	"Certified" (featuring Marcus)	Crump; Williams; Alexander	David Banner	4:11
10.	"Ain't Got Nothing" (featuring Magic & Lil' Boosie)	Crump; Awood Johnson; Torrence Hatch	David Banner	3:52
11.	"Bloody War" (featuring B.G.)	Crump; Christopher Dorsey	David Banner	4:30
12.	"Westside"	Crump; Vaushaun Brooks	Maestro	3:32
13.	"Take Your" (featuring Too $hort, Bun B & Jazze Pha)	Crump; Todd Shaw; Bernard Freeman; Alexander; Chris Ussery	Chris Flame; David Banner	4:42
14.	"My Life" (featuring Skyy)	Crump; Keeton	David Banner; Mike Hartnett (co.)	3:54
15.	"Ridin'" (featuring Talib Kweli & dead prez)	Crump; Talib Kweli Greene; Lavonne Alford; Clayton Gavin; Laurent Alfred; Earnest Franklin; Vijay Iyer	Downbeat Production Collective	4:33
16.	"X-Ed" (featuring Kamikaze)	Crump; Brad Franklin	David Banner	3:41
17.	"Crossroads" (featuring Grout)	Crump; William Whedbee; Jake Arnold	David Banner; Billy Hume (co.); Jake Arnold (co.)	3:45
Total length:				1:08:35

Bonus track
No.	Title	Writer(s)	Length
18.	"Shake That Booty (Krumpa Remix)" (featuring Elephant Man)	Crump; O'Neil Bryan; Dwayne Chin-Quee	3:06

Sample credits

- Track 8 contains elements from "King's Motorcade" written by Nile Rodgers from the motion picture "Coming to America".

== Charts ==
Chart (2005)	Peak position
US Billboard 200	6
US Top R&B/Hip-Hop Albums (Billboard)	3
US Top Rap Albums (Billboard)	2
