= Like a Pimp =

2003 single by David Banner

Single by David Banner featuring Lil Flip

from the album Mississippi: The Album
- Released: 2003
- Genre: Hip-hop; Southern hip-hop; dirty rap
- Length: 4:15
- Label: SRC; Universal
- Songwriters: Chad L. Butler; Lavell William Crump; Bernard Freeman; Ken Kivindyo; Lil Flip; Barry White
- Producer: David Banner

David Banner singles chronology
"Cadillac on 22's" (2006)	"Like a Pimp" (2003)	"Crank It Up" (2003)

"Like a Pimp" is a song by David Banner, released in 2003 from Mississippi: The Album. The song features fellow rapper Lil Flip and its accompanying music video was directed by Bernard Gourley. A portion of the song's chorus ("Girls get down on the floor") is interpolated from the UGK song "Take It Off" from their 2001 album Dirty Money as well as The Showboy's "Drag Rap (Triggerman)". It is recognized as one of Banner's signature songs along with "Play" and "Get Like Me". A remix of the song featuring Busta Rhymes and Twista appears on Banner's follow-up album MTA2: Baptized in Dirty Water.

== Usage ==
The song appeared in the movie 2 Fast 2 Furious during the opening credits.

It featured in the 2026 video game Grand Theft Auto VI as part of Dirty South Classics radio.

== Charts ==
The song reached No. 48 on the Billboard Hot 100, No. 15 on the R&B/Hip-Hop Songs chart, and No. 10 on the Rap Songs chart.

=== Weekly charts ===
Chart (2003)	Peak position
US Billboard Hot 100	48
US Hot R&B/Hip-Hop Songs (Billboard)	15
US Hot Rap Songs (Billboard)	10
US Rhythmic Airplay (Billboard)	29

=== Year-end charts ===
Chart (2003)	Position
US Hot R&B/Hip-Hop Songs (Billboard)	54
