= MTA2: Baptized in Dirty Water =

Studio album by David Banner
- Released: December 23, 2003
- Studio: David Banner's house (Jackson, MS); Sony Music Studios (New York, NY); SouthSide Studios (Atlanta, GA); ZAC Recording Studio (Atlanta, GA); The Zone (Atlanta, GA); Dean's List House Of Hits (Houston, TX); Nod Factor Recording Studios (Houston, TX); Storm Shelter Recordings (Decatur, AL); PatchWerk Recording Studios (Atlanta, GA); The Hit Factory (New York, NY); Cyberwerks Studios (Atlanta, GA)
- Genre: Southern hip hop; crunk
- Length: 1:10:42
- Label: SRC; Big Face; Universal
- Producer: Craig Love; Cyber Sapp; David Banner; Domo; Mannie Fresh; Uncle Eddie; Young Sears

David Banner chronology
Mississippi: The Album (2003)	MTA2: Baptized in Dirty Water (2003)	Certified (2005)

Singles from MTA2: Baptized in Dirty Water
- 1. "Crank It Up" Released: 2004

Professional ratings
Review scores
Source	Rating
AllHipHop	3/5 stars
AllMusic	4/5 stars
Now	3/5 Ns
RapReviews	7/10
Spin	B−
The Village Voice	(dud)

MTA2: Baptized in Dirty Water is the third solo studio album by American rapper and record producer David Banner. It was released on December 23, 2003, through Street Records Corporation, Big Face Entertainment and Universal Records. Serving as a sequel to Mississippi: The Album, the full-length marks his second studio release for the label.

Recording sessions took place at David Banner's house in Jackson, Sony Music Studios and The Hit Factory in New York, SouthSide Studios, ZAC Recording Studio, The Zone, PatchWerk Recording Studios and Cyberwerks Studios in Atlanta, Dean's List House Of Hits and Nod Factor Recording Studios in Houston, and Storm Shelter Recordings in Decatur.

Production was mainly handled by David Banner himself, as well as Domo, Craig Love, Cyber Sapp, Mannie Fresh, Young Sears and Uncle Eddie. It features guest appearances from Mr. Marcus, Skyy, 8Ball, Bonecrusher, Bun B, Busta Rhymes, Devin the Dude, Frekzanatcha, Jazze Pha, Lil' Flip, Nelly, Scarface, Static Major, T.I. and Twista.

In the United States, the album peaked at number 69 on the Billboard 200 and number 16 on Top R&B/Hip-Hop Albums charts.

== Track listing ==
No.	Title	Writer(s)	Producer(s)	Length
1.	"Eternal"	Lavell Crump	David Banner	3:05
2.	"Talk to Me" (featuring Lil' Flip)	Crump; Wesley Weston	David Banner	3:49
3.	"Like a Pimp (Remix)" (featuring Twista and Busta Rhymes)	Crump; Carl Mitchell; Trevor Smith; Bernard Freeman; Chad Butler	David Banner	3:59
4.	"Crank It Up" (featuring Static Major)	Crump; Stephen Garrett; Anthony Sears	Young Sears	3:15
5.	"Pretty Pink" (featuring Jazze Pha, T.I. and Marcus)	Crump; Phalon Alexander; Clifford Harris; Marcus Williams; Craig Love	Craig Love	5:00
6.	"Pop That" (featuring Skyy)	Crump; Skyler Synclair Keeton	David Banner	4:18
7.	"My Lord" (featuring Skyy and Marcus)	Crump; Keeton; Williams	David Banner	4:19
8.	"The Game" (featuring Scarface)	Crump; Brad Jordan; Michael Poye	Domo; Uncle Eddie	5:26
9.	"Gots to Go" (featuring Devin the Dude and Bun B)	Crump; Devin Copeland; Freeman; Poye	Domo	4:06
10.	"The Christmas Song" (featuring Marcus and Skyy)	Crump; Williams; Keeton	David Banner	4:09
11.	"Baptized in Dirty Water" (Interlude)			1:33
12.	"Ooh Aah"	Crump	David Banner	4:16
13.	"Mama's House" (featuring Frekzanatcha)	Crump; C. McDaniel; D. Menefield	David Banner	4:24
14.	"So in Love"	Crump; Byron Thomas	Mannie Fresh	3:03
15.	"Lil' Jones" (featuring Bonecrusher)	Crump; Wayne Hardnett	David Banner	4:38
16.	"Airforce Ones - The Remix (Bonus Track)" (featuring Nelly and 8Ball)	Crump; Cornell Haynes, Jr.; Premro Smith		4:28
17.	"We Ride Them Caddies" (featuring Marcus)	Crump; Williams; Keldrick Sapp	Cyber Sapp	4:41
18.	"The End" (Interlude)			2:13
Total length:				1:10:42

== Charts ==
=== Weekly charts ===
Chart (2004)	Peak position
US Billboard 200	69
US Top R&B/Hip-Hop Albums (Billboard)	16

=== Year-end charts ===
Chart (2004)	Position
US Top R&B/Hip-Hop Albums (Billboard)	76
