= The Greatest Story Ever Told (David Banner album) =

Studio album by David Banner
- Released: July 15, 2008
- Recorded: 2006–2008
- Studio: PatchWerk Recording Studios (Atlanta, GA); Tree Sound Studios (Norcross, GA); Stankonia Recordings (Atlanta, GA); Record Plant (Los Angeles, CA); 11th Street Studios (Atlanta, GA); Circle House Studios (Miami, FL); Platinum Sound Studios (New York, NY); Playmaker Music Studios (Atlanta, GA); Fever Recording Studio (Encino, CA); Crippin' Kitchen (Hollywood, CA)
- Genre: Southern hip-hop
- Length: 1:17:47
- Label: SRC; Big Face; Universal Motown
- Producer: Akon; Baby Dubb; Cool & Dre; Davel "Bo" McKenzie; David Banner; Get Cool; Nitti

David Banner chronology
Certified (2005)	The Greatest Story Ever Told (2008)	Death of a Pop Star (2010)

Singles from Greatest Story Ever Told
- 1. "9mm" Released: July 10, 2007; 2. "Get Like Me" Released: March 25, 2008; 3. "Shawty Say" Released: August 1, 2008

The Greatest Story Ever Told is the fifth solo studio album by American rapper and record producer David Banner. It was released on July 15, 2008, via Street Records Corporation, Big Face Entertainment and Universal Motown Records.

The album was recorded at PatchWerk Recording Studios, Stankonia Recordings, 11th Street Studios and Playmaker Music Studios in Atlanta, Tree Sound Studios in Norcross, Record Plant in Los Angeles, Circle House Studios in Miami, Platinum Sound Studios in New York City and Fever Recording Studio in Encino, with additional recording took place at Crippin' Kitchen in Hollywood.

Production was handled by Baby Dubb, Cool & Dre, Akon, Davel "Bo" McKenzie, Get Cool, Nitti, and David Banner himself. It features guest appearances from Lil Wayne, Akon, Carl Thomas, Chamillionaire, Chris Brown, Jazze Pha, Jim Jones, Kandi Burruss, Mr. Marcus, Snoop Dogg, UGK and Yung Joc.

In the United States, the album debuted at number 8 on the Billboard 200 and number 3 on both the Top R&B/Hip-Hop Albums and Top Rap Albums charts, selling 52,000 copies in its first week.

The album was supported by three singles: "Speaker" (better known by its explicit title "9mm"), "Get Like Me" and "Lollipop"-sampled "Shawty Say". An accompanying music video for the latter premiered on FNMTV on August 1, 2008. Banner put three instrumental tracks on his album. During an appearance on 106 & Park, he confirmed that this was to help up-and-coming artists by letting them rap on the beats after purchasing the album.

== Critical reception ==
Professional ratings
Aggregate scores
Source	Rating
Metacritic	57/100
Review scores
Source	Rating
AllMusic	3.5/5 stars
Entertainment Weekly	C+
HipHopDX	3/5
IGN	7.1/10
MSN Music	(2-star Honorable Mention)
Now	2/5 Ns
Pitchfork	4.6/10
RapReviews	5.5/10
Rolling Stone	2.5/5 stars
The Phoenix	2.5/4 stars

The Greatest Story Ever Told was met with mixed or average reviews from music critics. At Metacritic, which assigns a normalized rating out of 100 to reviews from mainstream publications, the album received an average score of 57 based on eleven reviews.

AllMusic's David Jeffries wrote: "dismantle, reconstruct, then split, and The Greatest Story Ever Told earns decent marks--it's just hard not to focus on the handful of cuts that point to what could have been". Andrew Graham of The Boston Phoenix thought that the album "would be a stronger statement if it weren't for the conflicting cornerstones of conscientious-rapper soapboxing and standard-issue gangsta themes he's laid at its foundation".

In mixed reviews, Simon Vozick-Levinson of Entertainment Weekly stated: "all things considered, we like Banner much better when he's angry". Pedro Hernandez of RapReviews concluded: "rather than staying true to political and social roots that got him signed in the first place, David Banner has chosen to mimic what's popular". Christian Hoard of Rolling Stone wrote: "the political commentary could be stronger--"No justice for us blacks/But they send just us to Iraq" is as sharp as it gets—and though Story has got radio-ready appeal, Banner could learn a lesson from his buddy Wayne: Interesting and crowd-pleasing aren't mutually exclusive". Tom Breihan of Pitchfork resumed: "the beats on Story never quite cohere, and tracks like 'Uncle Swac Interlude', an endless phone conversation with Banner's drunk uncle, further interrupt the flow".

== Track listing ==
No.	Title	Writer(s)	Producer(s)	Length
1.	"So Long"	Lavell Crump; Willie Poole	Get Cool	3:42
2.	"G.S.E.T. Intro"	Crump; Warryn Campbell	Baby Dubb	1:29
3.	"Suicide Doors" (featuring UGK and Kandi)	Crump; Bernard Freeman; Chad Butler; Kandi Burruss; Clifford Harris; D'Juan Hart; Darwin Quinn	David Banner	4:14
4.	"9mm" (featuring Akon, Lil Wayne and Snoop Dogg)	Crump; Aliaune Thiam; Dwayne Carter; Calvin Broadus	Akon	4:07
5.	"T.I. Speaks" (Interlude)			2:10
6.	"Get Like Me" (featuring Chris Brown and Yung Joc)	Crump; Christopher Brown; Jasiel Robinson	David Banner	3:44
7.	"Shawty Say" (featuring Lil Wayne)	Crump; Carter	David Banner	3:38
8.	"A Girl"	Crump; Marcello Valenzano; Andre Lyon	Cool & Dre	3:15
9.	"Syrup Sipping" (Banner Beat Break)			1:07
10.	"Hold On" (featuring Marcus)	Crump; Marcus Williams; Al Green; Willie Mitchell	David Banner	4:42
11.	"Cadillac on 22's, Pt. 2"	Crump; Michael D. Hartnett	David Banner	4:18
12.	"Uncle Swac" (Interlude)			3:47
13.	"I Get By" (featuring Carl Thomas)	Crump; Carlton Thomas; Davel McKenzie; Isaac Hayes	Davel "Bo" McKenzie	3:24
14.	"Freedom" (Interlude)			1:03
15.	"B.A.N. (The Love Song)"	Crump; Bert Keyes; Sylvia Robinson	David Banner	4:31
16.	"Fuck You Hoes" (featuring Jim Jones)	Crump; Joseph Jones; Valenzano; Lyon	Cool & Dre	4:25
17.	"Marz" (Banner Beat Break)			1:09
18.	"Ball with Me" (featuring Chamillionaire)	Crump; Hakeem Seriki; Chadron Moore	Nitti	3:25
19.	"K.O."	Crump	David Banner	3:29
20.	"Fly" (featuring Jazze Pha)	Crump; Phalon Alexander	David Banner	3:10
21.	"Faith"	Crump; Campbell; Dontae Winslow	Baby Dubb	3:37
22.	Untitled			7:17
Total length:				1:17:47

Sample credits

- Track 3 contains elements of "Shoulder Lean" written by Clifford Harris, D'Juan Hart and Darwin Quinn and performed by Young Dro.
- Track 10 contains elements of "Something" written by Al Green and Willie Mitchell and performed by Al Green.
- Track 13 contains elements of "It's Heaven to Me" written and performed by Isaac Hayes.
- Track 15 contains elements of "Love on a Two-Way Street" written by Bert Keyes and Sylvia Robinson and performed by Stacy Lattisaw.

== Personnel ==
- Lavell "David Banner" Crump – vocals, producer & programming (tracks: 3, 6, 7, 10, 11, 15, 19, 20), A&R
- Tiffani Tyre – backing vocals (track 2)
- Bernard "Bun B" Freeman – vocals (track 3)
- Chad "Pimp C" Butler – vocals (track 3)
- Kandi Burruss – vocals (track 3)
- Aliaune Akon Thiam – vocals, producer & programming (track 4)
- Dwayne "Lil' Wayne" Carter – vocals (tracks: 4, 7)
- Calvin "Snoop Dogg" Broadus – vocals (track 4)
- Chris Brown – vocals (track 6)
- Jasiel "Yung Joc" Robinson – vocals (track 6)
- Marcus Williams – vocals (track 10)
- Roxanne Estrada – backing vocals (track 10)
- Carl Thomas – vocals (track 13)
- Joseph "Jim Jones" Jones II – vocals (track 16)
- Hakeem "Chamillionaire" Seriki – vocals (track 18)
- Phalon "Jazze Pha" Alexander – vocals (track 20)
- Derrick "Yung Wurld" McAllister – keyboards (track 10)
- Willie "Get Cool" Poole – producer & programming (track 1)
- Warryn "Baby Dubb" Campbell – producer & programming (tracks: 2, 21)
- Marcello Valenzano – producer & programming (tracks: 8, 16)
- Andre Lyon – producer & programming (tracks: 8, 16)
- Davel "Bo" McKenzie – producer & programming (track 13)
- Chadron "Nitti" Moore – producer & programming (track 18)
- Kori Anders – recording (tracks: 1, 6, 7, 15, 19), additional recording (track 16), mixing assistant (tracks: 4, 20)
- Travis Daniels – recording (tracks: 2, 11, 20)
- Chris Carmouche – recording (tracks: 3, 10)
- William Durst – recording (track 4)
- James Paul Wisner – recording (track 8)
- Kevin Cross – recording (track 13)
- Danny Ogle – recording (track 15)
- Justin Marchan – recording (track 18)
- Bruce Buechner – recording (track 21)
- Mack Woodard – recording assistant (tracks: 2, 11, 20)
- Warren Bletcher – recording assistant (track 3)
- Chris Jackson – additional recording (track 4)
- Mike Miller – recording assistant (tracks: 6, 19), additional recording assistant (track 16)
- Shane Morris – additional recording (track 21)
- Carlos Bess – mixing (tracks: 1, 8, 15)
- Manny Marroquin – mixing (tracks: 2, 21)
- John Frye – mixing (tracks: 3, 6, 10, 11, 18, 19)
- Leslie Brathwaite – mixing (tracks: 4, 20)
- Pat Viala – mixing (track 7)
- John Hanes – mixing (track 13)
- Sprague "Doogie" Williams – mixing (track 13)
- Jean-Marie Horvat – mixing (track 16)
- Jared Robbins – mixing assistant (tracks: 2, 21)
- Gary Fly – mixing assistant (tracks: 3, 6, 10, 11, 19)
- Justin Trawick – mixing assistant (tracks: 4, 20)
- Chris Soper – mixing assistant (track 7)
- Timmy Roberts – mixing assistant (track 13)
- Tom Coyne – mastering
- Joe Spix – art direction, design
- Patrick Hoelck – photography

== Charts ==
=== Weekly charts ===
Chart (2008)	Peak position
US Billboard 200	8
US Top R&B/Hip-Hop Albums (Billboard)	3
US Top Rap Albums (Billboard)	3

=== Year-end charts ===
Chart (2008)	Position
US Top R&B/Hip-Hop Albums (Billboard)	59
