= Penalty Recordings =

Penalty
- Parent company: Sony
- Founded: 1995
- Founder: Neil Levine
- Distributor: Tommy Boy
- Genre: Hip hop
- Country of origin: United States
- Location: New York City, New York
- Official website: penaltyent.com

Penalty is an American record label and entertainment company, founded and run by CEO Neil Levine. The company was founded in 1995 as a record label specializing in hip-hop music.

The original Penalty label was acquired by its distributor, Tommy Boy, in 1999. A second version, Penalty Associated Labels, was operated by Levine in association with Rykodisc from 2002 to 2006. The third and current incarnation was established in 2014.

Artists on Penalty have included Capone-N-Noreaga (as well as both Capone and Noreaga/N.O.R.E. as solo artists), Lord Finesse, Ali Shaheed Muhammed of A Tribe Called Quest, and The Beatnuts, among others.

== History ==
=== 1995–1999 ===
After a career as an independent marketing professional, Neil Levine founded Penalty Recordings, launching it in 1995 as a joint venture between himself and Tom Silverman. Silverman was the founder and original owner of Tommy Boy, a division of Warner Bros. Records which served as Penalty's distributor. In 1996, Silverman re-purchased half of the interest in Tommy Boy, which continued as Penalty's distributor.

Specializing in Hip-Hop music, The initial releases on Penalty included the single "Crime Saga" by Shabazz the Disciple and both the single "Hip 2 Da Game" and the album The Awakening by Lord Finesse. Other early Penalty artists included Crooked Lettaz, Blackjack, Foesum, and the group Capone-N-Noreaga, whose first release on the label was the single "Stick You" in 1996. The Capone-N-Noreaga album The War Report followed in 1997, which reached a peak of #21 on The Billboard 200 album sales chart.

Between 1997 and 1999, Penalty released albums by artists such as Skull Duggery, Crooked Lettaz (David Banner and Kamikaze), Half a Mill, and 187 Fac. It also released the first two solo albums by Noreaga. The first, N.O.R.E., reached a peak of #3 on The Billboard 200 and featured the Top 40 hit "Superthug", one of the earliest hits produced by The Neptunes (Pharrell Williams and Chad Hugo).

Levine sold the remaining 50% of Penalty to Tommy Boy in 1999, staying on long enough to complete the transition before moving on to eventually become Vice-President of Urban Marketing and Artist Development at TVT Records. The artists on Penalty became Tommy Boy artists following the close of the acquisition.

=== 2002–2006 ===
In 2002, Levine reestablished Penalty in partnership with Rykostar. a company for which Levine would also serve as the general manager of. The re-established label featured J-Live, The Beatnuts, Ali Shaheed Muhammad, MC Eiht, and Zion I among its roster, many of them with their own imprints on Penalty. Three of its key releases during this period between 2002 and 2006 were Milk Me by the Beanuts, Shaheedullah And Stereotypes by Ali Shaheed Muhammad, and The Hear After by J-Live.

Penalty was also one of the partners involved in producing and marketing the AND1 Mixtape Tour series of DVDs, featuring gameplay and interviews of streetball players. The label closed in 2006, when Levine became the head of Imperial Records for EMI Music.

=== 2014–present ===
On January 21, 2014, Penalty was reactivated as an independent label distributed by RED, in 2014. Among its 1st signings were Penalty alumni Capone-N-Noreaga, who released a new album Lessons, in 2014. The label has also put out releases by Lil' Mo, Joell Ortiz, BeatKing, Hi-Rez and EMC, which includes Masta Ace, Wordsworth and Strick. Penalty released BeatKing's album 3 Weeks on October 30, 2015, with upcoming releases by Statik KXNG (Statik Selektah & KXNG Crooked) and Trina set for release before the end of the year.

== Current artists ==
- Capone-N-Noreaga
  - Masta Ace
- Joell Ortiz
- Lil' Mo
- Trina

== See also ==
- List of record labels
