= The God Box (album) =

2017 album by David Banner

Studio album by David Banner
- Released: May 19, 2017
- Genre: Hip hop
- Length: 53:26
- Label: A Banner Vision
- Producer: Joy Rohadfox (exec.); David Banner (also exec.); David Moody (co-exec.); Jasmine Kimball (co-exec.); Stephanie Taylor (co-exec.); Regina Davenport (co-exec.); Mali Hunter (co-exec.); Kawan "KP" Prather (co-exec.); Hector Delgado (co-exec.); Chris "THX" Goodman; DJ Khalil; D.O. Speaks; Forest Factory; Street Symphony

David Banner chronology
| Sex, Drugs & Video Games (2012) | The God Box (2017) |

Professional ratings
Review scores
| Source | Rating |
|---|---|
| Exclaim! | 6/10 |
| RapReviews | 8.5/10 |

The God Box (stylized as #TheGodBox) is the sixth solo studio album by American rapper and record producer David Banner from Mississippi. It was released on May 19, 2017, via A Banner Vision. It features guest appearances from Raheem DeVaughn, WatchTheDuck, Big K.R.I.T., Big Rube, Black Thought, Cee-Lo Green, Devon Lewow, Kap G, Kenya Jori, Tim Wise, Rudy Currence and Tito Lo.

== Track listing ==
| No. | Title | Writer(s) | Producer(s) | Length |
|---|---|---|---|---|
| 1. | "Magnolia" (featuring CeeLo Green and Raheem DeVaughn) | Lavell Crump; Chris "THX" Goodman; Thomas Calloway | Chris "THX" Goodman | 3:44 |
| 2. | "My Uzi" (featuring Big K.R.I.T.) | Crump; Justin Scott; John Debney; Antonio Mouring; Thomas Burroughs; Chad Butler; Bernard James Freeman | David Banner | 4:57 |
| 3. | "Who Want It" (featuring Black Thought and WatchTheDuck) | Crump; Goodman; Tariq Luqmaan Trotter | Chris "THX" Goodman | 3:56 |
| 4. | "Elvis" | Crump; Steve Thornton; Mouring | Swiff D | 4:18 |
| 5. | "Amy" | Crump; Burroughs | David Banner; Thomas Burroughs (add.) | 3:39 |
| 6. | "August" | Crump; Forest Factory | Forest Factory | 1:22 |
| 7. | "Cleopatra Jones" | Crump; Burroughs | David Banner; Thomas Burroughs (add.) | 3:05 |
| 8. | "Marry Me" (featuring Rudy Currence) | Crump; Ruperd Grier "Rudy Currence" Currence III; Mouring | David Banner; Rudy Currence (co.) | 4:17 |
| 9. | "Judy Blare" (featuring Devon Lewow) | Crump; Mouring; Daniel Watson; Paul-Devon Lewow | David Banner | 3:46 |
| 10. | "Traffic on Mars" (featuring Kap G, WatchTheDuck, Tim Wise and Kenya Jori) | Crump; Mouring; Jesse Rankins; George Ramirez; Watson | David Banner; Daniel Watson (co.) | 5:02 |
| 11. | "Black Fist" (featuring Tito Lo) | Crump; Mouring; Matthew Massaro; Derrick Okoth; Torrance Esmond | 8x8; D.O. Speaks; Tyshane; Street Symphony | 2:24 |
| 12. | "AK" (featuring Raheem DeVaughn and Big Rube) | Crump; Khalil Abdul-Rahman; Raheem DeVaughn; Ruben Bailey; Mouring | DJ Khalil | 4:55 |
| 13. | "Burning Thumbs" | Crump | David Banner | 3:39 |
| 14. | "Wizdom Selah" (Outro) | Crump; Brandi Rae; Lyn Brooks; Goodman | Chris "THX" Goodman; David Banner (co.) | 4:22 |
| Total length: | | | | 53:26 |

== Charts ==
| Chart (2017) | Peak position |
|---|---|
| US Billboard 200 | 76 |
| US Top R&B/Hip-Hop Albums (Billboard) | 38 |
| US Digital Albums (Billboard) | 14 |
| US Independent Albums (Billboard) | 5 |
