= Them Firewater Boyz, Vol. 1 =

Studio album by David Banner
- Released: August 15, 2000 (US)
- Recorded: 1999–2000
- Genre: Southern hip-hop; crunk; hardcore hip-hop
- Label: Big Face Entertainment
- Producer: David Banner

David Banner chronology
Them Firewater Boyz, Vol. 1 (2000)	Mississippi: The Album (2003)

Professional ratings
Review scores
Source	Rating
AllMusic	4/5 stars

Them Firewater Boyz, Vol. 1 is the debut studio album by American rapper and record producer David Banner. It was released independently on August 15, 2000, by Big Face Entertainment. The album features guest appearances from fellow American rappers such as Pimp C, Fiend, Devin the Dude, Kamikaze (of the Crooked Lettaz), Bone Crusher, Polow (now Polow da Don), Young Bleed, and Noreaga, among others.

== Track listing ==
- All tracks produced by David Banner

No.	Title	Length
1.	"Flickin' Twankies" (featuring Burd, Boo, Kamikaze and Marcus)	4:55
2.	"Firewater Boyz" (featuring Thug Addict, Marcus and Kamikaze)	4:17
3.	"Welcome to Jackson (Intro)"	1:24
4.	"Pay Your Dues" (featuring Kamikaze and Doberman Gang)	6:22
5.	"Twerk Something" (featuring Jazze Pha)	3:44
6.	"Living" (featuring Kamikaze, Devin the Dude and Macaffey)	4:49
7.	"Lil Jones" (featuring Bone Crusher)	4:29
8.	"Akmil's Revenge (Interlude)"	0:35
9.	"Get Crunk" (featuring Kamikaze and Pimp C)	4:14
10.	"Uh Huh" (featuring Young Bleed)	3:22
11.	"My Little Cousin Sweets (skit)"	0:40
12.	"Trill" (featuring Kamikaze)	4:00
13.	"Dope Popper" (featuring Kamikaze and Boo)	3:30
14.	"If I Had a Choice" (featuring Fiend)	3:55
15.	"Whoomp! Whoompalude! (Interlude)"	0:32
16.	"NO! MO!!! (BITCH WHAT!!!!)"	3:26
17.	"Spazz Out" (featuring Ras Kass)	2:57
18.	"Joe Smuckatelly (Interlude)"	0:59
19.	"Ain't Nothing" (featuring J da Groova and Bone Crusher)	4:19
20.	"Firewater" (featuring Kamikaze and Noreaga)	4:03
21.	"Eulogy" (featuring Polow da Don, Bizzar, Fiend, Kamikaze, Bone Crusher, J da Groova and Bohagon)	6:27

== Notes ==
- "Get Crunk", "Trill", and "Firewater" all previously appeared on the Crooked Lettaz album Grey Skies which was released a little over a year before Them Firewater Boyz, Vol. 1 on April 20, 1999.
