= Sex, Drugs & Video Games =

Mixtape by David Banner
- Released: May 22, 2012
- Recorded: 2011–12
- Genre: Hip hop
- Length: 64:05
- Label: Self-released
- Producer: David Banner; Swiff D; Chris "THX" Goodman; Hector Delgado; M-Phazes; Mr. Lee; The Hypnotics

David Banner chronology
Death of a Pop Star (2010)	Sex, Drugs & Video Games (2012)	#TheGodBox (2017)

Singles from Sex, Drugs & Video Games
- 1. "Swag" Released: August 9, 2011; 2. "Yao Ming" Released: December 16, 2011; 3. "Amazing" Released: May 22, 2012

Professional ratings
Review scores
Source	Rating
Pitchfork	4.9/10

Sex, Drugs & Video Games is a mixtape by American rapper and record producer David Banner from Mississippi. It was self-released on May 22, 2012 in an attempt to profoundly change the music industry.

== Track listing ==
No.	Title	Producer(s)	Length
1.	"Intro"		0:22
2.	"Sex, Drugs & Video Games"	M-Phazes	3:27
3.	"Believe" (featuring Big K.R.I.T.)	Mr. Lee	3:34
4.	"Yao Ming (Remix)" (featuring Chris Brown & A$AP Rocky)	David Banner; Swiff D	3:45
5.	"Mothers And Sisters"		0:23
6.	"Amazing" (featuring Chris Brown)	David Banner; Swiff D	3:30
7.	"Swag (Remix)" (featuring Kardinal Offishall)	David Banner; Swiff D	3:56
8.	"Who's That?"	David Banner; Swiff D	3:23
9.	"Smoked Out" (featuring Bun B & Raheem Devaughn)		5:35
10.	"Work" (featuring Don Trip)	David Banner	3:39
11.	"The Big Concert"		0:23
12.	"Californication" (featuring Snoop Dogg, The Game, Nipsey Hussle, Ras Kass & Kree)	David Banner; Chris "THX" Goodman	6:05
13.	"No Choice" (featuring J-Doe)	The Hypnotics	3:47
14.	"Castles In Brooklyn" (featuring Maino)	Hector Delgado	3:57
15.	"Pushing"		0:23
16.	"Malcolm X (A Song To Me)"	David Banner; Chris "THX" Goodman	4:33
17.	"I Look Good" (featuring Doe Hicks, Savvy & Luck)	David Banner; Swiff D	4:21
18.	"Let Me In" (featuring Tank)	David Banner; Swiff D	3:42
19.	"The End"		0:58
20.	"Yao Ming" (featuring Lil Wayne & 2 Chainz)	David Banner; Swiff D	3:52

- "Castle In Brooklyn" contains a sample of "Brass Monkey" by the Beastie Boys
- "Believe" contains a sample of "Love U 4 Life by Jodeci
