= The Mind of Mannie Fresh =

Studio album by Mannie Fresh
- Released: December 21, 2004
- Genre: Hip hop
- Length: 78:52
- Label: Cash Money; Universal
- Producer: Mannie Fresh; David Banner

Mannie Fresh chronology
The Mind of Mannie Fresh (2004)	Return of the Ballin' (2009)

Professional ratings
Review scores
Source	Rating
AllMusic	3.5/5 stars
Stylus Magazine	A−
Robert Christgau	(2-star Honorable Mention)
PopMatters	9/10
RapReviews	7/10
Rolling Stone	3/5 stars
USA Today	2/4 stars

The Mind of Mannie Fresh is the debut studio album by Mannie Fresh. It was released on December 21, 2004, by Cash Money Records and Universal Records. The album debuted at number 59, then peaked at number 47 on Billboard 200, selling over 70,000 copies in its first week of release.

== Track listing ==
The Mind of Mannie Fresh track listing
No.	Title	Writer(s)	Producer(s)	Length
1.	"Intro"	Byron Thomas		2:29
2.	"Conversation" (featuring Tateeze)	Thomas; Tateeze	Mannie Fresh	3:55
3.	"Answering Machine" (Skit)			0:31
4.	"Chubby Boy"	Thomas	Mannie Fresh	3:58
5.	"Phone Message #1" (Skit)			0:38
6.	"Beautiful Bitch" (featuring Six Shot)	Thomas; Six Shot	Mannie Fresh	3:46
7.	"Wayne's Takeover 1" (featuring Lil Wayne)	Dwayne Carter; Thomas	Mannie Fresh	2:20
8.	"Pussy Power"	Thomas	Mannie Fresh	3:31
9.	"Phone Message #2" (Skit)			0:45
10.	"We Fresh" (featuring Lil Wayne)	Thomas; Carter	Mannie Fresh	3:32
11.	"Mississippi" (Skit)			0:05
12.	"Go With Me" (performed by Big Tymers)	Thomas; Bryan Williams; Lavell Crump	David Banner	3:45
13.	"Lady Lady" (featuring Lil Wayne & R. Kelly)	Thomas; Carter; Robert Kelly	Mannie Fresh	3:57
14.	"Nothing Compares To Love"	Thomas	Mannie Fresh	4:07
15.	"Wayne's Takeover 2" (featuring Lil Wayne)	Carter; Thomas	Mannie Fresh	2:47
16.	"How We Ride" (featuring Jasper, Bun B & David Banner)	Thomas; Crump; Bernard Freeman; Jasper; Albert Brown; Kyle West	Mannie Fresh	4:20
17.	"Not Tonight"	Thomas	Mannie Fresh	4:06
18.	"The DJ"	Roger Dickerson		1:27
19.	"Real Big"	Thomas	Mannie Fresh	3:48
20.	"Great Moments In The Ghetto #1" (featuring Petey Pablo)			1:02
21.	"Tell It Like It Is"	Thomas	Mannie Fresh	3:11
22.	"Dinnerlude"			1:12
23.	"Day In The Life (Cadillac Doors)"	Thomas	Mannie Fresh	3:33
24.	"Great Moments In The Ghetto #2"			0:56
25.	"I Know You Ain't Happy"	Thomas	Mannie Fresh	3:09
26.	"Phone Message #3" (Skit)			0:31
27.	"Fight Song"	Thomas	Mannie Fresh	4:18
28.	"Mayor Song"	Thomas	Mannie Fresh	1:59
29.	"Swingers & Singers" (Skit)			0:28
30.	"Shake That Ass" (featuring Lil' Mo, Tateeze & Reel)	Thomas; Keith Sweat; Teddy Riley; Cynthia Loving	Mannie Fresh	4:46

Sample credits

- "Lady Lady" contains samples from "Loveland", written and performed by R. Kelly.
- "How We Ride" contains interpolations of "Nite and Day", written by Albert Brown and Kyle West.
- "Shake That Ass" contains interpolations from "Make It Last Forever", written by Keith Sweat and Teddy Riley.

== Charts ==
=== Weekly charts ===
Weekly chart performance for The Mind of Mannie Fresh
Chart (2005)	Peak position
US Billboard 200	47
US Top R&B/Hip-Hop Albums (Billboard)	16

=== Year-end charts ===
2005 year-end chart performance for The Mind of Mannie Fresh
Chart (2005)	Position
US Top R&B/Hip-Hop Albums	87
