= Mississippi: The Album =

Studio album by David Banner
- Released: May 20, 2003
- Recorded: 2002–03
- Studio: David Banner's house (Jackson, MS); The Medicine Cabinet (New Orleans, LA); Access Studios (Atlanta, GA); Southside Studios (Houston, TX); David Banner's Astro Van; The Zone (Atlanta, GA); The FY Station (Atlanta, GA); Top Notch Studios (Dallas, TX); Seven Eight Studios (Atlanta, GA); Crack Alley (New Orleans, LA); Scott's House; 1 Life 1 Love Studios (Jackson, MS)
- Genre: Southern hip hop
- Length: 1:19:32
- Label: SRC; Big Face; Universal
- Producer: Billy Hume; Bread & Water; David Banner; KLC; Lil' Jon; Mixzo

David Banner chronology
| Them Firewater Boyz, Vol. 1 (2000) | Mississippi: The Album (2003) | MTA2: Baptized in Dirty Water (2003) |

Singles from Mississippi: The Album
- 1. "Cadillac on 22's" Released: 2003; 2. "Like a Pimp" Released: 2003

Professional ratings
Review scores
| Source | Rating |
|---|---|
| AllHipHop | 4/5 stars |
| AllMusic | 4/5 stars |
| Entertainment Weekly | B+ |
| HipHopDX | 4/5 |
| RapReviews | 8/10 |

Mississippi: The Album is the second solo studio album by American rapper and record producer David Banner. It was released on May 20, 2003, via Street Records Corporation, Big Face Entertainment and Universal Records.

Recording sessions took place at David Banner's house in Jackson and his Astro Van, at the Medicine Cabinet and Crack Alley in New Orleans, at Access Studios, the Zone, the FY Station and Seven Eight Studios in Atlanta, at Southside Studios in Houston, at Top Notch Studios in Dallas, at Scott's House, and at 1 Life 1 Love Studios also in Jackson.

Beside Banner, who produced the majority of the album, the production was handled by Billy Hume, Bread and Water, KLC, Lil' Jon and Mixzo. It features guest appearances from Mr. Marcus, Ax, B-Flat, Fiend, J Da Groova, Lil' Flip, Lil' Jon, Mississippi Shawty, Pastor Troy, Skyy, Smoke D, as well as his Crooked Lettaz partner Kamikaze.

The album peaked at number 9 on the Billboard 200 and atop the Top R&B/Hip-Hop Albums charts in the United States.

== Track listing ==
| No. | Title | Writer(s) | Producer(s) | Length |
|---|---|---|---|---|
| 1. | "Intro" | Lavell Crump | David Banner | 1:22 |
| 2. | "What It Do" (featuring Smoke D) | Crump; Freddie Douglas Southwell | KLC | 5:14 |
| 3. | "Might Getcha" (featuring Lil' Jon) | Crump; Jonathan Smith; Premro Smith; Chadron Moore | Lil' Jon | 5:02 |
| 4. | "Like a Pimp" (featuring Lil' Flip) | Crump; Wesley Weston; Chad Butler | David Banner | 4:15 |
| 5. | "Whoremonger" | Crump; D. "Sweets" Smith | David Banner | 1:03 |
| 6. | "Fuck 'Em" (featuring Pastor Troy) | Crump; Micah Troy; Wayne Hardnett | David Banner | 4:43 |
| 7. | "Mississippi" | Crump | David Banner | 5:05 |
| 8. | "Cadillac on 22's" | Crump | David Banner | 4:25 |
| 9. | "Fast Life" (featuring Ax) | Crump; Daryl Tell | Mixzo | 4:53 |
| 10. | "Choose Me" (featuring Skyy) | Crump; Skyler Synclair Keeton; William Whedbee; Cedric Leonard | Billy Hume; Lil' Jon (co.) | 4:26 |
| 11. | "Really Don't Wanna Go" (featuring B-Flat and Marcus) | Crump; Broderick Phillips; Marcus Williams | David Banner | 3:26 |
| 12. | "So Trill" | Crump | Bread and Water | 4:03 |
| 13. | "My Shawty" (featuring Fiend) | Crump; Richard Jones | David Banner | 3:55 |
| 14. | "Phone Tap" | Crump | David Banner | 1:53 |
| 15. | "Bush" | Crump | David Banner | 3:01 |
| 16. | "Bring It On" (featuring J Da Groova and Mississippi Shawty) | Crump; J. Martin | David Banner | 4:15 |
| 17. | "Still Pimpin'" (featuring Marcus and Kamikaze) | Crump; Williams; Brad Franklin | David Banner | 7:12 |
| 18. | "Outro" | Crump | David Banner | 6:41 |
| 19. | "Fire Falling" | | | 4:38 |
| Total length: | | | | 1:19:32 |

Sample credits

- Track 3 contains re-sung elements from "Stop Playing Games" written by Premro Smith and Chadron Moore.
- Track 4 contains a sample of "Take It Off" written in part by Chad Butler and Bernard Freeman.

== Personnel ==
- Lavell "David Banner" Crump – vocals, strings (track 1), keyboard programming (track 15), producer (tracks: 1, 4–8, 11, 13–19), recording (tracks: 1, 14, 18), mixing (tracks: 1, 5, 14, 18)
- Freddie "Smoke D" Southwell – vocals (track 2)
- Jonathan "Lil' Jon" Smith – vocals & producer (track 3), additional programming & co-producer (track 10)
- Wesley "Lil' Flip" Weston – vocals (track 4)
- Micah "Pastor" Troy – vocals (track 5)
- Wayne "Bone Crusher" Hardnett Jr. – additional background vocals (track 5)
- Skyler Synclair Keeton – additional vocals (tracks: 7, 15), vocals (track 10)
- Daryl "AX" Tell – vocals (track 9)
- Broderick "B-Flat" Phillips – vocals (track 11)
- Marcus Williams – vocals (tracks: 11, 17)
- Richard "Fiend" Jones Jr. – vocals (track 13)
- J. "J Da Groova" Martin – vocals (track 16)
- Mississippi Shawty – vocals (track 16)
- Brad "Kamikaze" Franklin – vocals (track 17)
- Patrick Hayes – guitar (tracks: 1, 17)
- Robert McDowell – keyboards (track 3)
- Leonard Julien III – tenor and baritone saxophone (track 6)
- Richard L. Owens – trombone (track 6)
- Jason P. Freeman – trumpet & flugelhorn (track 6)
- Jerry E. Freeman Jr. – trumpet & flugelhorn (track 6)
- Hornz Unlimited – horns (track 6)
- James "LRoc" Phillips – strings & additional percussion (track 6)
- William "Billy Hume" Whedbee – guitar & bass (tracks: 7, 10), producer (track 10), recording (tracks: 6, 7, 10), mixing (tracks: 4, 7, 10, 16, 17)
- Zafar Saood – guitar (track 8)
- Donald "Eldorado Redd" Jackson – saxophone (track 12)
- Chris Rosser – trombone, producer & recording (track 12)
- Freddie Mac – guitar (track 15)
- Avery Johnson – bass (track 15), recording (tracks: 3, 15)
- Strings R Us – strings (track 15)
- F. Macafee – keyboards (track 17)
- Craig "KLC" Lawson – producer, recording & mixing (track 2)
- Michael "Mixzo" Johnson – producer & recording (track 9)
- Conrad Rosser – producer & recording (track 12)
- M.J. – recording (track 4)
- Craig Bazile – recording (track 8)
- Clint Wilkerson – recording (track 11)
- Fred – recording (track 16)
- John Frye – mixing (tracks: 3, 6, 8, 9, 11, 15)
- Rodney Mills – mastering
- Mike Schreiber – photography

== Charts ==
=== Weekly charts ===
| Chart (2003) | Peak position |
|---|---|
| US Billboard 200 | 9 |
| US Top R&B/Hip-Hop Albums (Billboard) | 1 |

=== Year-end charts ===
| Chart (2003) | Position |
|---|---|
| US Billboard 200 | 156 |
| US Top R&B/Hip-Hop Albums (Billboard) | 43 |
