= Shawty Say =

Single by David Banner featuring Lil Wayne

from the album The Greatest Story Ever Told
- Released: August 1, 2008
- Recorded: 2008
- Genre: Dirty rap, pop rap, southern rap
- Length: 3:38
- Label: Universal, b.i.g. f.a.c.e., SRC
- Songwriters: Darius Harrison, Dwayne Carter, James Scheffer, Levell Crump, Rex Zamor, Stephen Garrett
- Producer: David Banner

David Banner singles chronology
| "You're Everything" (2008) | "Shawty Say" (2008) | "Cool" (2008) |

Lil Wayne singles chronology
| "Let It Rock" (2008) | "Shawty Say" (2008) | "Official Girl" (2008) |

"Shawty Say" is a song produced and performed by David Banner, released as the third single from his fifth studio album, The Greatest Story Ever Told. The song features Lil Wayne and samples his song "Lollipop". The song has a similar vibe to Banner's previous single "Get Like Me". The song was leaked on June 26, 2008 and was officially released on August 1, 2008. Banner utilizes the auto-tune technique for parts of the song.

== Music video ==
The music video was released on August 1, 2008 on MTV's FNMTV. The video features Ryan Sheckler. It starts off as David Banner giving abused girlfriends his card while interrogating their boyfriends. Near the end he invites them to his house for a party.

== Charts ==
| Chart (2008) | Peak position |
|---|---|
| US Bubbling Under Hot 100 (Billboard) | 10 |
| US Hot R&B/Hip-Hop Songs (Billboard) | 53 |
| US Hot Rap Songs (Billboard) | 25 |
| US Pop 100 (Billboard) | 88 |
| US Rhythmic Airplay (Billboard) | 31 |
