= PatchWerk Recording Studios =

Recording studio in Atlanta, Georgia

Coordinates: 33°47′5″N 84°24′23″W

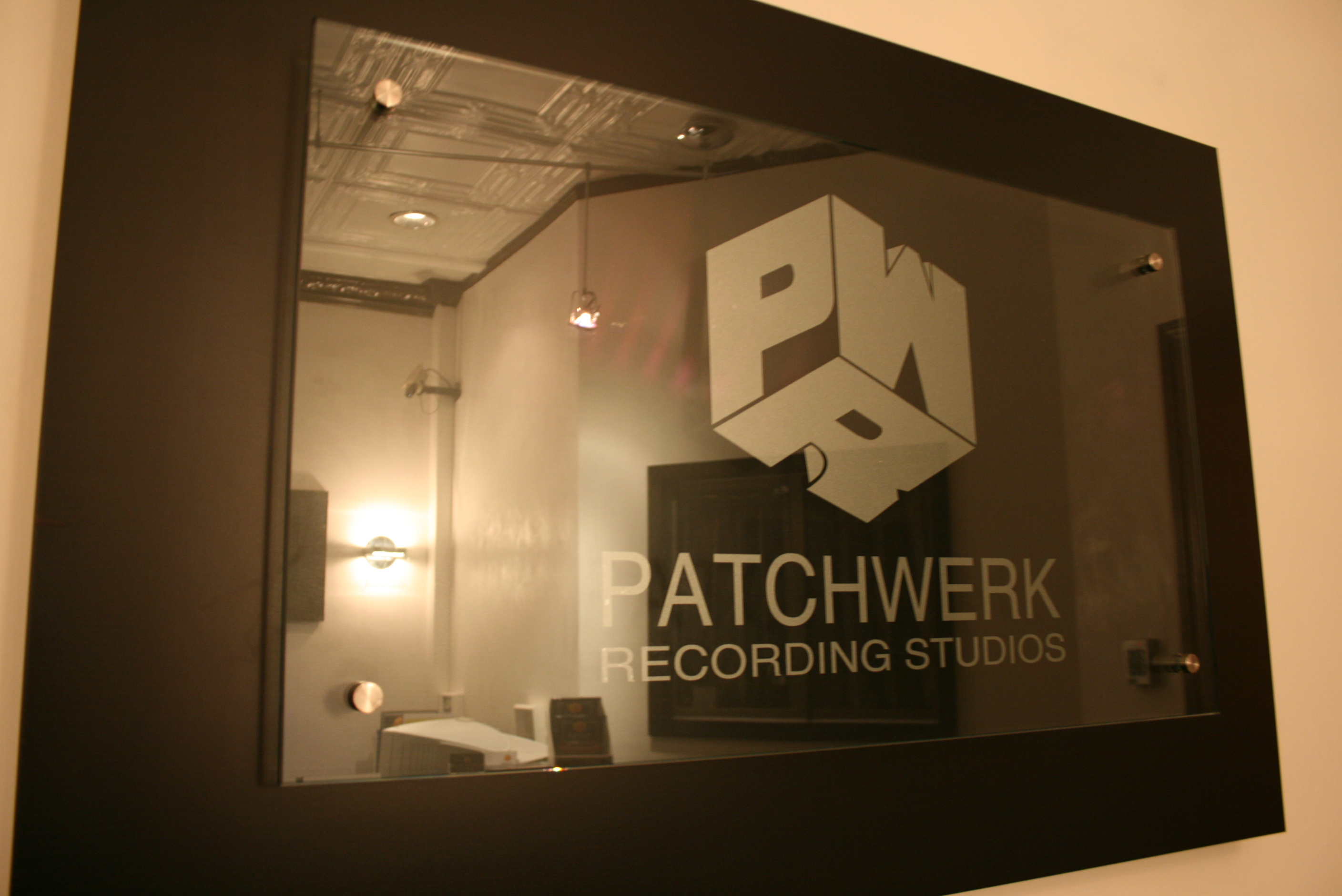
Patchwerk Recording Studios

Patchwerk Recording Studios is a recording studio located at 1094 Hemphill Avenue, West Midtown in Atlanta, Georgia. It was established in 1993 by former NFL offensive tackle Bob Whitfield of the Atlanta Falcons, and is currently owned and operated by Curtis Daniel III and Mike Wilson. The facility features two totally isolated recording studios, namely Studio 995 and Studio 9000, along with Studio 1019, a vocal tracking and editing studio in the 9000 wing of the building. Apart from the facility's use as a recording studio, the premises are also used for audio mastering in the Mastering Studio, a Production Studio for beatmakers, as well as offering Paperwerk Registration, Video and Photography, and Graphic Design services.

Outside of the studio, Patchwerk Recordings was functional as a record label from 1993 to 2006, releasing records from the likes of Ras Kass, Vooodu, Meen Green, Jatis and the Southwest Click. They have also hosted a number of events and musical seminars, including the IdOMusic® series and Music University.

== History ==
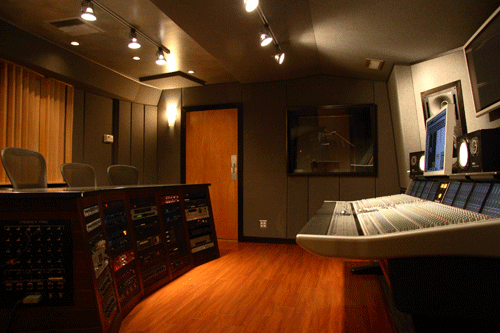
Studio 995

Founded in 1993 as a record label in Carson, California, by former Atlanta Falcons offensive tackle Bob Whitfield, after financing studio time to record a demo for his high school friend and aspiring rapper Ras Kass, Bob hired his college friend and entrepreneur B.J. Kerr, and together they released Ras Kass’ first single "Remain AnonymouS". The success of that single led to a licensing deal with Priority Records in 1995, and the release of Ras Kass debut album Soul on Ice the following year.

In mid 1995 Patchwerk expanded their operations by opening a full service recording studio in Atlanta, Georgia. The original studio was a 3000 sq. foot facility located at 995 McMillan Street, converted from a residential house in the Home Park area of West Midtown. The studio quickly gained a foothold in the market, attracting producers from the likes of Organized Noize, So So Def Recordings, LaFace Records and Hitco Music Publishing.

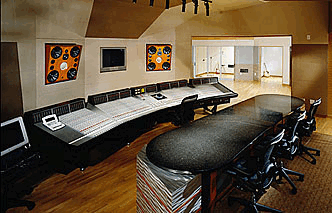
Studio 9000

Equipped with a fully automated Otari Concept One 32-track console (64 input/output), the Studer A827 recorder and the Spectral Direct-to-Disk digital recorder with Prism Audio interface, the studio featured fully automated 48-track 2" recording capabilities, and was home of four of the most sought after engineers in the South.

The year 2000 saw the studio relocating to its current location, a 10,000 sq. foot building located on 1094 Hemphill Avenue. Once a convenience store which was refurbished into a photography studio for The Coca-Cola Company, the building was remodeled once again, with operations running in the new Studio 995 simultaneous to the expansion in the back of the building of Studio 9000, which was completed and made operational in 2002. The new studio, at the time, had the only SSL J 9000 console in the city. In 2007 the Otari Concept One 32-track console was upgraded to a SSL Duality Console, 48 input with Total Recall, Ultimation and Pro Tools HUI control in Studio 995. The Otari Concept One console was donated to the Senate Music Recording Industry Committee, and was on display at the Georgia Music Hall of Fame in Macon, Georgia.

== Recording and mixing consoles ==
- Studio 995: 48 Fader Solid State Logic Duality Console
- Studio 9000: 96 Fader Solid State Logic 9096 J

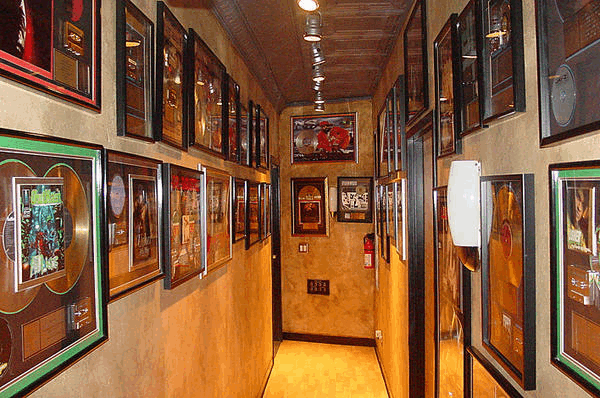
Various Gold and Platinum plaques hanging in the hallways at Patchwerk Recording Studios.

== Interior ==
The interior of Patchwerk is modern and elegantly designed in an 'industrial cool' fashion, a two floor building with a basement and a private parking lot in the back. Studio 995 is situated in the front of the building, Studio 9000 in the back, and the Mastering Studio in the basement. A spiral staircase leads to the Mastering Studio in the basement, as well as another lounge area and some offices. The walls in the hallways are decorated in Gold and Platinum plaques from the likes of Ras Kass, Outkast, Goodie Mob, Gucci Mane, TLC, 2Pac, The Notorious B.I.G., Nas, Missy Elliott, Beyoncé, Madonna, Too $hort, Lil Jon, Ludacris, T.I., Young Jeezy, Birdman and Lil Wayne, to name a few.

The private upstairs lounge area of the 9000 wing features a pool table, wide screen television and an Xbox 360. There are vending machines as well as a kitchen in Studio 9000, with a private parking lot in the back of the building. A second private lounge area is located in the 995 wing.
