= Get Like Me (David Banner song) =

Single by David Banner featuring Chris Brown

from the album The Greatest Story Ever Told
- Released: March 12, 2008
- Recorded: 2007
- Genre: Hip hop; southern rap
- Length: 3:45
- Label: Universal Motown Records
- Songwriters: Lavell Crump; Jasiel Robinson; Chris Brown
- Producer: David Banner

David Banner singles chronology
"Speaker" (2007)	"Get Like Me" (2008)	"You're Everything" (2008)

Chris Brown singles chronology
"No Air" (2008)	"Get Like Me" (2008)	"Take You Down" (2008)

"Get Like Me" is the second single from David Banner's sixth album, The Greatest Story Ever Told. The song features Chris Brown and samples several lines from "It's Goin' Down" by fellow rapper Yung Joc, who, while not officially credited or featured, appears in the song's music video. There was an alternate version of the song featuring Jim Jones, but label troubles prevented his version from being released.

== Reception ==
AllMusic editor David Jeffries highlighted the song as did Robert Christgau. Sputnikmusic's Maximilan Harknes wrote a positive review: "Another song that stands out on the album is the big hit single 'Get Like Me' in all of its spastic, mainstream goodness (...) David Banner's production gives the 'Ballin!' feel ('Get Like Me')."

== Music video ==
The video was shot at Los Angeles and directed by Ulysses Terrero. Chris Brown guest-stars in the video, as does Yung Joc. Cameos include Barry Bonds, Gabrielle Union, and the Maloof family brothers Gavin and Joe. The music video was released May 13, 2008 on BET's 106 & Park, but was leaked a few days earlier. Banner is seen at two points in the video wearing a shirt saying "I miss Pimp C", a reference to the deceased southern rapper. He also goes on and says in the song, "I got Chad in my heart, and DJ Screw in my cup." Chad was Pimp C's first name.

== Remixes ==
Lil Wayne released a freestyle of "Get Like Me", titled "Stuntin" with Canadian rapper Drake, on his mixtape Dedication 3. The official remix features Jim Jones.

== Charts ==
The song first appeared on the US Bubbling Under R&B/Hip-Hop Songs chart at number 10; this was the version featuring Jim Jones, then after two weeks on the chart, it peaked at No. 93 on the main Hot R&B/Hip-Hop Songs chart, then falling off completely so the official single without Jim Jones could chart. This single has proven to be David Banner's second most successful to date, hitting number 16 on the Billboard Hot 100, after "Play", which hit number seven.

=== Weekly charts ===
Chart (2008)	Peak position
US Billboard Hot 100	16
US Hot R&B/Hip-Hop Songs (Billboard)	7
US Hot Rap Songs (Billboard)	2
US Latin Rhythm Airplay (Billboard)	13
US Pop Airplay (Billboard)	39
US Pop 100 (Billboard)	38
US Rhythmic Airplay (Billboard)	1

=== Year-end charts ===
Chart (2008)	Position
US Billboard Hot 100	66
US Hot R&B/Hip-Hop Songs (Billboard)	42
US Rhythmic (Billboard)	7
