= Play (David Banner song) =

Single by David Banner

from the album Certified
- Released: July 7, 2005
- Recorded: 2004
- Genre: Southern hip hop, snap, dirty rap
- Length: 3:50
- Label: Universal
- Songwriter: David Banner
- Producer: Mr. Collipark

David Banner singles chronology
"Ain't Got Nothing" (2005)	"Play" (2005)	"Touching" (2005)

"Play" is the only single released by rapper David Banner from his fourth studio album Certified. It was produced by Mr. Collipark.

Released in 2005, the single peaked at No. 7 on the Billboard Hot 100, remaining his sole top 10 hit and his best-performing single. "Play" remains David Banner's most successful and best-selling single to date, receiving the RIAA certification for Gold-level sales.

An alternate version, entitled the "Canadian Mix", features Kardinal Offishall and Solitair and appears on the single.

== Track listing ==
1. "Play" (edited album version)
2. "Play" (explicit album version)
3. "Ain't Got Nothing" (Canadian mix, feat. Kardinal Offishall and Solitair)
4. "Play" (BET version, video)

== Charts ==
=== Weekly charts ===
Chart (2005)	Peak position
US Billboard Hot 100	7
US Hot R&B/Hip-Hop Songs (Billboard)	5
US Hot Rap Songs (Billboard)	3
US Rhythmic Airplay (Billboard)	4

=== Year-end charts ===
Chart (2005)	Position
US Billboard Hot 100	51
US Hot R&B/Hip-Hop Songs (Billboard)	34
US Rhythmic (Billboard)	24

== Certifications ==
Region	Certification	Certified units/sales
United States (RIAA)	Gold	500,000^{*}
^{*} Sales figures based on certification alone.

== Release history ==
Release dates and formats for "Play"
Region	Date	Format	Label(s)	Ref.
United States	September 13, 2005	Mainstream airplay	SRC; Universal	
