= David Banner =

American rapper (born 1974)

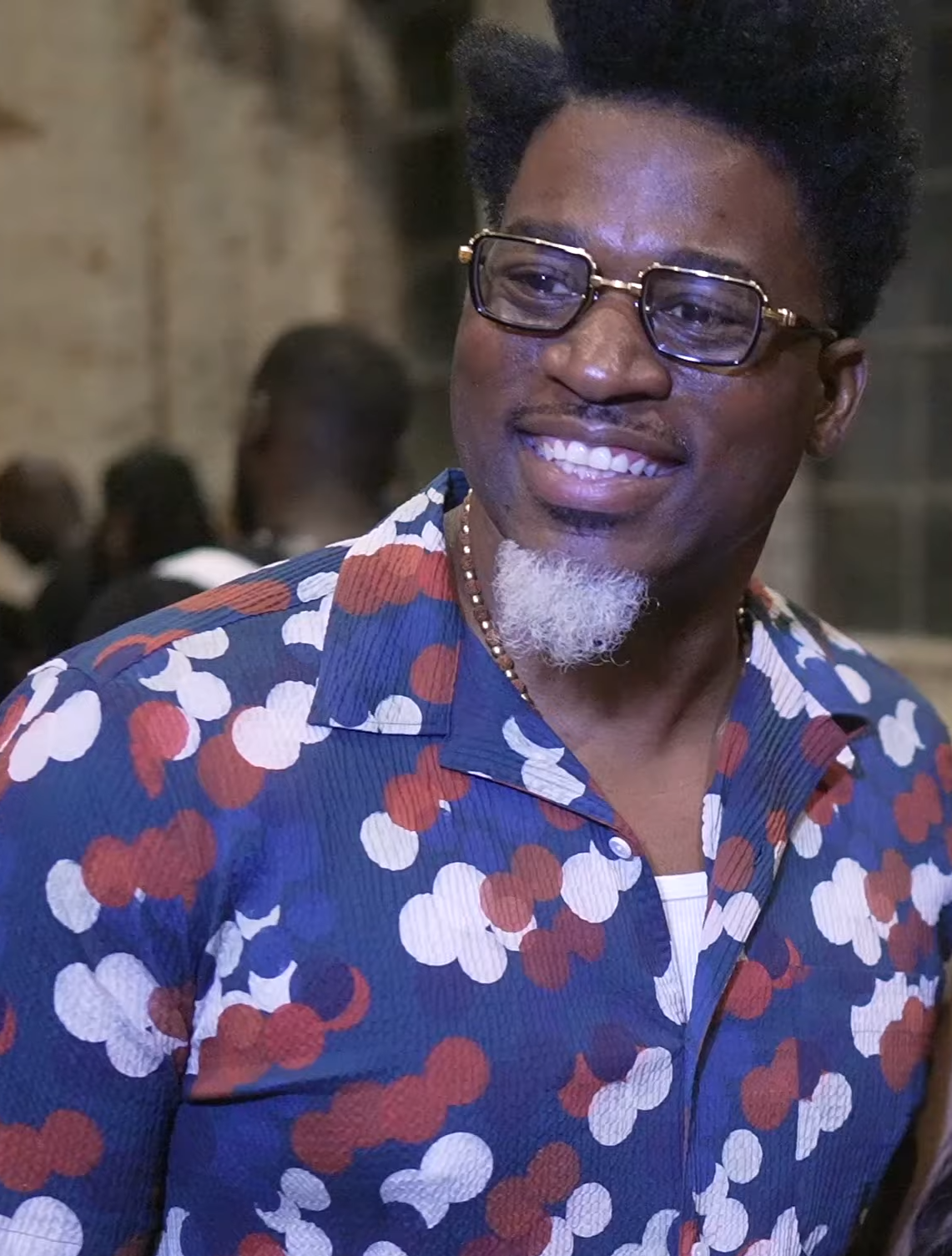
- Banner in 2023

Background information
- Born: Lavell William Crump; April 11, 1974 (age 52)
- Origin: Jackson, Mississippi, U.S.
- Education: Southern University (BS)
- Genres: Southern hip-hop
- Occupations: Rapper; songwriter; record producer; actor; activist
- Years active: 1994–present
- Labels: A Banner Vision; eOne; Universal; SRC; Big Face
- Formerly of: Crooked Lettaz
- Website: davidbanner.com

Lavell William Crump (born April 11, 1974), known professionally as David Banner, is an American rapper, record producer, actor, and activist.

Banner was raised in Jackson, Mississippi. Banner graduated from Southern University with a bachelor's degree, then attended University of Maryland Eastern Shore to pursue a master's. He started his music career as a member of the rap duo Crooked Lettaz, before going solo in 2000 with the release titled Them Firewater Boyz, Vol. 1. In 2003, Banner signed to Universal Records, where he released four albums: Mississippi: The Album (2003), MTA2: Baptized in Dirty Water (2003), Certified (2005), and The Greatest Story Ever Told (2008). He is also a noted producer, having produced music for himself, Trick Daddy, T.I., Lil Boosie and Lil Wayne, among others. As an actor, Banner appeared in the films Black Snake Moan (2006), This Christmas (2007), The Butler (2013), and Ride Along (2014), as well as the television series Empire, Saints & Sinners, and The Family Business: New Orleans.

== Early life ==
Lavell William Crump was raised in Jackson, the elder son of Zeno Crump Jr., Jackson district fire chief, and Carolyn Crump. He graduated from Provine High School in Jackson in 1992 and then attended Southern University in Baton Rouge, Louisiana, his mother's alma mater. At Southern University, Crump served as president of the Student Government Association and received a bachelor's degree in business. He later attended the University of Maryland Eastern Shore to pursue a master's degree in education but later left the program to pursue his music career full-time.

== Music career ==
=== 1995–2000: Beginnings and Them Firewater Boyz, Vol. 1 ===
Crump's stage name "David Banner" is taken from the lead character of the television series, The Incredible Hulk. With several of his friends, Banner sent some demo tapes to Jackson, Mississippi radio station, WJMI. Record executive Glenn Toby discovered the group and signed them to Neil Levine at Penalty Records. In 1999, Banner and rapper Kamikaze as the duo, Crooked Lettaz, released Grey Skies (Penalty Recordings). In 2000, Banner released his solo debut album, Them Firewater Boyz, Vol. 1. Released on the independent label, Big Face Records, the album sold around 7,000 copies.

=== 2003–2006: Mississippi: The Album, MTA2: Baptized in Dirty Water and Certified ===
After assessing various offers, Banner and manager, Scott Johnson, decided to sign with Universal Records subsidiary, SRC Records, which was founded by Steve Rifkind who had previous success as CEO of the heavyweight hip-hop label, Loud Records. In 2003, Banner produced T.I.'s single, "Rubber Band Man", which reached No. 30 on the Hot 100, No. 15 on the R&B chart, and No. 11 on the Rap chart. In 2003, Banner released his first major label album, Mississippi: The Album. Mississippi included the hit single, "Like a Pimp", featuring Lil Flip. "Like a Pimp" peaked at No. 48 on the Billboard Hot 100 chart, No. 15 on the Hot R&B/Hip-Hop Songs chart, and No. 10 on the Hot Rap Tracks chart. He released the follow-up album the same year titled MTA2: Baptized in Dirty Water which yielded the hit, "Crank It Up", featuring Static Major.

In 2005, Banner released his third major label album, Certified. The album's first single was "Ain't Got Nothing" which featured Magic & Lil Boosie, followed by the second single, "Play", which reached No. 7 on the Hot 100 chart, No. 5 on the R&B chart, and No. 3 on the Rap chart. The third single, "Touching", featured Jazze Pha and reached No. 54 on the R&B chart. In 2006, Banner appeared on "Seein' Thangs", a song about Hurricane Katrina featured on DJ Shadow's album "The Outsider". A remix featuring Bay Area hyphy rappers Nump and Gold also was made. Outside projects for Banner have included writing the theme song to the video game, Saints Row, as well as contributing to the music for a commercial promoting the video game, Marvel vs. Capcom 3: Fate of Two Worlds. Banner played the part of Tehronne in Black Snake Moan (2006).

=== 2007–present: The Greatest Story Ever Told and The God Box ===
Banner appeared on the Adult Swim pilot That Crook'd 'Sipp, which premiered on May 13, 2007. His single "Play" was used as the background music in the pilot's first television promo. That same year, he played the character of Mo, in the film This Christmas. On July 15, 2008, Banner released his fourth major label album, The Greatest Story Ever Told. The album's first single titled "9mm" featured Akon, Lil Wayne, and Snoop Dogg. Banner then produced his next two singles: "Get Like Me" featuring Chris Brown and Yung Joc, and "Shawty Say", featuring Lil Wayne. "Get Like Me" reached No. 16 on the Hot 100, No. 7 on the R&B chart, and No. 2 on the Rap chart. In 2008, Banner was featured on the track Superfriend, from the 2008 album, The Sound, by gospel R&B duo Mary Mary.

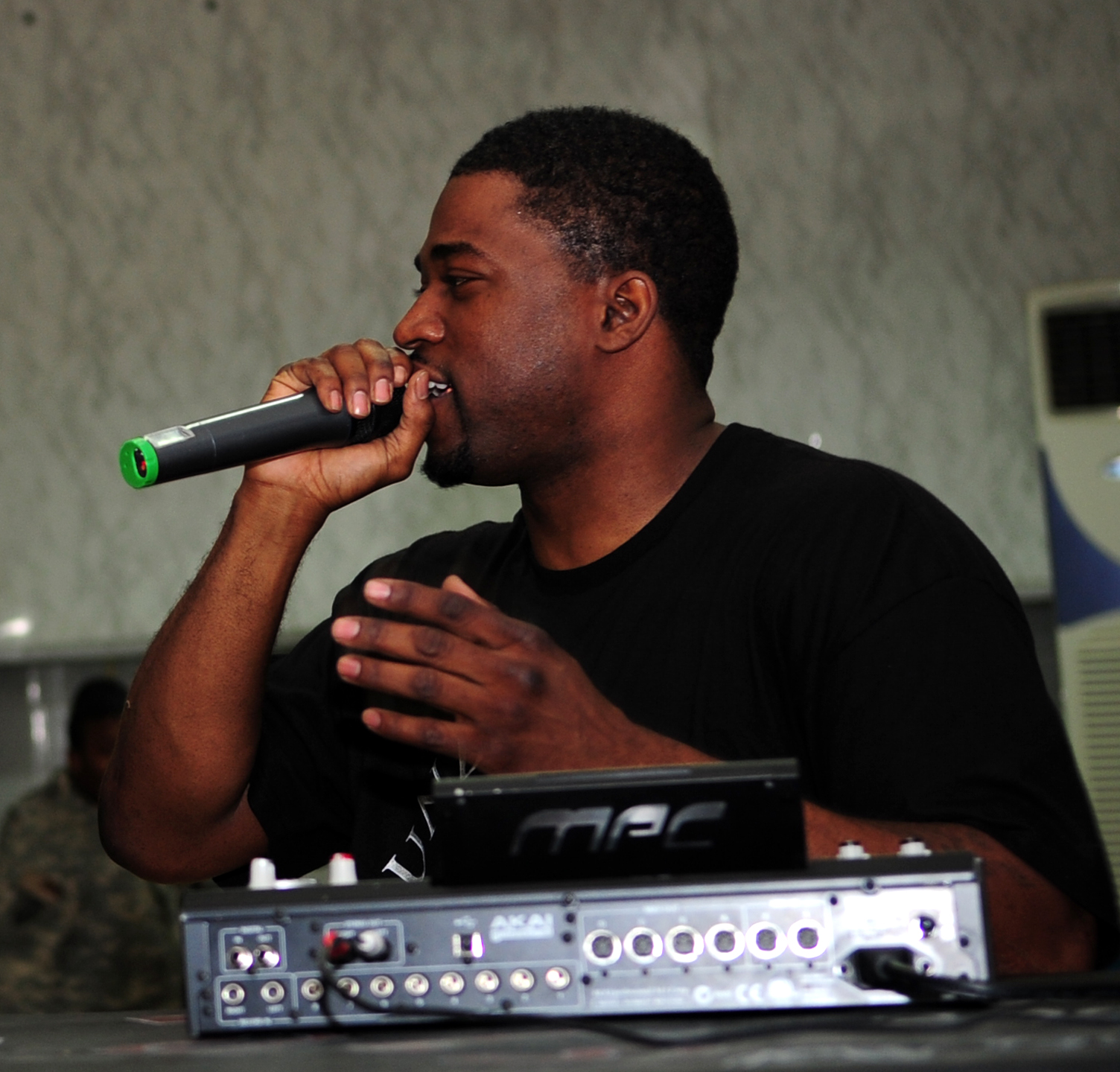
Banner in 2009

In 2010, he played Bosch in the film The Experiment and as Jay, a gang leader from the hood in Stomp the Yard: Homecoming. He has also worked with international artists such as Seeda, a Japanese Rap Artist where he was featured in the song, Life Song in 2010 on Seeda's Breathe Album. Banner released his debut mixtape titled Sex, Drugs and Video Games on May 22, 2012, as a free download. It is also available on his website, davidbanner.com, where fans are encouraged to make a donation of at least $1 for the sixteen song mixtape. The first single off the mixtape is titled "Amazing" featuring Chris Brown. It was announced that Universal Republic Records was going defunct, all of the artists on the roster moved from the label including (David Banner) was being moved to Republic Records making the label itself revived.

In 2013, Banner appeared in the music video for the song Confessions by Lecrae. Banner played Earl Gaines, Cecil Gaines' father, in the 2013 film The Butler. Banner plays Jay, a criminal who is interrogated, in the 2014 film Ride Along. David Banner was featured on a remix of Mexican American rapper Kap G's single "La Policia", which stirred hype throughout the media and the internet.

== Humanitarian and political work ==
In November 2006, Banner was awarded a Visionary Award by the National Black Caucus of State Legislators in Jackson, Mississippi in recognition of his humanitarian work in response to Hurricane Katrina. On September 25, 2007, Banner testified before Congress at a hearing about racism and misogyny in hip hop music titled From Imus to Industry: The Business of Stereotypes and Degrading Images. He defended his use of offensive language and argued: "Change the situation in my neighborhood and maybe I'll get better." In his opening statement, Banner stated: "I can admit there are some problems in hip hop but it is only a reflection of what's taking place in our society. Hip hop is sick because America is sick."

== Discography ==
Studio albums

- Them Firewater Boyz, Vol. 1 (2000)
- Mississippi: The Album (2003)
- MTA2: Baptized in Dirty Water (2003)
- Certified (2005)
- The Greatest Story Ever Told (2008)
- #TheGodBox (2017)

Collaborative albums

- Death of a Pop Star (with 9th Wonder) (2010)

== Filmography ==
=== Film ===
Year	Title	Role	Notes
2006	Black Snake Moan	Tehronne	
2007	This Christmas	"Mo"	
2008	Days of Wrath	"Kryme"	
2010	Stomp the Yard: Homecoming	Jay	
2010	The Experiment	Bosch	
2010	The Confidant	Daniel Jackson	
2013	The Butler	Earl Gaines	
2013	A Christmas Blessing	Charles	TV movie
2014	Ride Along	Jay	
2014	Where's the Love?	Sidney	TV movie
2014	Flight 7500	Co-Pilot Tom Anders	
2015	Carter High School	Royce West	
2016	The Last Punch	Bundini	
2018	Babes With Blades	Supporting Artist	
2018	Never Heard	Aaron Davis	
2021	Saints & Sinners: Judgement Day	Darryl Greene	TV movie
2024	Finding Tony	Terrace Daniel	

=== Television ===
Year	Title	Role	Notes
2007	Monk	"Snake", The Assassin	Episode: "Mr. Monk and the Rapper"
2012	The Ropes	Himself	Episode: "Ralphie's Way"
2013	Walking with Gods	Alex	Main Cast
2016–2018	Saints & Sinners	Pastor Darryl Greene	Recurring Cast: Season 1–3
2019–2020	Empire	Philly Street	Recurring Cast: Season 6
2024	Fight Night: The Million Dollar Heist	"Missouri Slim"	Recurring Cast
2025	The Family Business: New Orleans	Jean LeBlanc	Main Cast
2025	The Equalizer	Security Guard	Episode: "Taken"

=== Music videos ===
Year	Song	Artist	Role
2004	"Rubber Band Man"	T.I.	Himself
2004	"Let Me In"	Young Buck featuring 50 Cent	Himself
2005	"Sunshine to the Rain"	Miri Ben-Ari featuring Scarface & Anthony Hamilton	
2005	"Twisted Transistor"	Korn	David Silveria
2009	"Respect My Conglomerate"	Busta Rhymes featuring Jadakiss & Lil Wayne	Himself
2019	"Steady Love"	India Arie	Himself

| 2008 | "Cool" | Anthony Hamilton | Himself

| 2006 | "Dem Jeans | Chingy featuring Jermaine Dupri | Himself

=== Video games ===
Year	Title	Role
2004	Def Jam: Fight for NY	Himself (voice)
2006	Def Jam: Fight for NY – The Takeover	Himself (voice)

== Awards ==
- BET Hip Hop Awards
  - 2008, Best Hip-Hop Video ("Get Like Me") with Chris Brown & Yung Joc [nominated]
  - 2008, Best Hip-Hop Collabo ("Get Like Me") with Chris Brown & Yung Joc [nominated]
  - 2008, Best Producer [nominated]
- Ozone Awards
  - 2008, Best Rap/R&B Collaboration ("Get Like Me"), featuring Chris Brown & Yung Joc [nominated]
