= Crooked Lettaz =

American hip hop group

- Origin: Jackson, Mississippi, US
- Genres: Hip-Hop
- Years active: 1995–2000
- Label: Penalty
- Members: Kamikaze; David Banner

Crooked Lettaz was an American hip hop duo from Jackson, Mississippi, composed of Brad "Kamikaze" Franklin and Lavell "David Banner" Crump.

In 1998, Crooked Lettaz signed to independent label Penalty Recordings. Later that same year, the duo's first promotional-only single, "Caught Up In The Game", was released followed by 1999's two-track single, "Firewater" (featuring Noreaga)/"Get Crunk" (featuring Pimp C from UGK). Crooked Lettaz's full-length album, Grey Skies, was released on April 20, 1999, peaking at #75 on the Billboard's R&B chart.

After the release of the album, Banner and Kamikaze embarked on solo careers.

== Discography ==
=== Studio albums ===
List of studio albums, with selected chart positions
Title	Album details	Peak chart positions		
Title	Album details	US	US R&B	US Rap
Grey Skies	Released: April 20, 1999; Label: Penalty; Format: CD, LP, digital download	—	75	—
