= N.O.R.E. discography =

- Studio albums: 6
- Compilation albums: 2
- Singles: 28
- Mixtapes: 5

The discography of N.O.R.E., consists of six studio albums (including one Spanish-language album), two compilation albums, five mixtapes and 28 singles (including four as a featured artist).

== Albums ==
=== Studio albums ===
List of albums, with selected chart positions and certifications
Title	Album details	Peak chart positions				Certifications
Title	Album details	US	US R&B	US Rap	UK	Certifications
N.O.R.E. (as Noreaga)	Released: July 7, 1998; Label: Penalty, Tommy Boy; Format: CD, LP, cassette, digital download	3	1	—	72	RIAA: Gold
Melvin Flynt – Da Hustler (as Noreaga)	Released: August 24, 1999; Label: Penalty, Tommy Boy; Format: CD, LP, cassette, digital download	9	3	—	115	RIAA: Gold
God's Favorite	Released: June 25, 2002; Label: Thugged Out, Def Jam; Format: CD, LP, cassette, digital download	3	3	—	152	
N.O.R.E. y la Familia...Ya Tú Sabe	Released: September 12, 2006; Label: Roc-La-Familia, Def Jam; Format: CD, LP, digital download	82	—	8	—	
Noreality	Released: August 28, 2007; Label: Thugged Out, Babygrande; Format: CD, digital download	—	31	14	—	
Student of the Game	Released: April 16, 2013; Label: Thugged Out, E1 Music; Format: CD, digital download	116	15	12	—	
5E	Released: July 27, 2018; Label: Thugged Out, Mass Appeal; Format: LP, digital download	—	—	—	—	
"—" denotes a recording that did not chart or was not released in that territory.

=== Compilation albums ===
Title	Album details
N.O.R.E. Presents: Resource Room (with Good Belt Gang)	Released: February 11, 2014; Label: Militainment Business; Format: CD, digital download
N.O.R.E. Presents: DRINKS (with Militainment)	Released: December 25, 2014; Label: Militainment Business; Format: CD, digital download

=== Miscellaneous ===
Title	Album details	Notes
1 Fan a Day	Released: March 14, 2006 (Shelved); Label: Thugged Out, Violator, Def Jam	

== Mixtapes ==
Title	Mixtape details
Cocaine on Steroids	Released: 2007; Label: Self-released; Format: Digital download
The N.O.R.E.aster EP	Released: 2011; Label: Self-released; Format: Digital download
Crack on Steroids	Released: 2012; Label: Self-released; Format: Digital download
Noreaster: The 4:20 Mixtape	Released: April 20, 2014; Label: Self-released; Format: Digital download
Drunk Uncle	Released: March 25, 2016; Label: Self-released; Format: Digital download

== Singles ==
=== As lead artist ===
List of singles, with selected chart positions, showing year released and album name
Title	Year	Peak chart positions					Certifications	Album
Title	Year	US	US R&B	US Rap	GER	UK	Certifications	Album
"N.O.R.E." (as Noreaga)	1998	112	59	32	—	—		N.O.R.E.
"Superthug" (as Noreaga) (featuring Tammy Lucas)	1998	36	15	1	74	103		N.O.R.E.
"Banned from T.V." (as Noreaga) (featuring Big Pun, Nature, Cam'ron, Jadakiss and Styles P)	1998	—	—	—	—	103		N.O.R.E.
"Blood Money Pt. 3" (as Noreaga) (featuring Mike B.)	1999	—	—	—	—	—		Melvin Flynt – Da Hustler
"Oh No" (as Noreaga)	1999	—	49	—	—	113		Melvin Flynt – Da Hustler
"Grimey" (as Noreaga)	2001	—	62	—	—	—		Violator: The Album, V2.0/God's Favorite
"Live My Life" (featuring Ja Rule)	2002	—	95	—	—	—		God's Favorite
"Nothin'"	2002	10	2	3	—	11		God's Favorite
"Head Bussa"	2002	—	73	—	—	—		God's Favorite
"Oye Mi Canto" (featuring Nina Sky, Daddy Yankee, Gem Star and Big Mato)	2004	12	24	8	—	—	RIAA: Gold	1 Fan a Day/N.O.R.E. y la Familia...Ya Tú Sabe
"Mas Maiz" (featuring Nina Sky, Big Mato, La Negra, Lumidee, Pitbull, Fat Joe, Chingo Bling and Lil Rob)	2006	—	74	—	—	—		N.O.R.E. y la Familia...Ya Tú Sabe
"Bailar Conmigo" (featuring Big Mato, Don Omar and Diddy)	2006	—	—	—	—	—		N.O.R.E. y la Familia...Ya Tú Sabe
"Set It Off" (featuring Swizz Beatz and J. Ru$$)	2007	—	—	—	—	—		Noreality
"Move" (featuring Nina Sky and Jim Jones)	2009	—	—	—	—	—		S.O.R.E.
"Finito" (featuring Lil Wayne and Pharrell)	2011	—	—	—	—	—		Scared Money - EP
"Electrolytes" (featuring Macy Gray and DMX)	2011	—	—	—	—	—		Scared Money - EP
"Slime Father" (featuring Cory Gunz)	2011	—	—	—	—	—		Scared Money - EP
"Scared Money" (featuring Pusha T and Meek Mill)	2011	—	—	—	—	—		Scared Money - EP
"Lehhhgooo" (featuring Waka Flocka Flame, Busta Rhymes and Game)	2012	—	—	—	—	—		Crack on Steroids
"Hare Krishna" (featuring RZA)	2012	—	—	—	—	—		Crack on Steroids
"Baby Girl" (featuring Cassie)	2012	—	—	—	—	—		Crack on Steroids
"Get Her" (featuring Wale and Sho Ballotti)	2012	—	—	—	—	—		Crack on Steroids
"Gangstas Don't Die" (featuring Jadakiss)	2012	—	—	—	—	—		Student of the Game
"Tadow" (featuring French Montana, 2 Chainz and Pusha T)	2013	—	—	—	—	—		Student of the Game
"Uno Mas" (featuring Pharrell)	2017	—	—	—	—	—		5E
"Don't Know" (featuring Fat Joe)	2018	—	—	—	—	—		5E
"Big Chain" (featuring Fabolous)	2018	—	—	—	—	—		5E
"—" denotes a recording that did not chart or was not released in that territory.

=== As featured artist ===
List of singles, with selected chart positions, showing year released and album name
Title	Year	Peak chart positions		Album
Title	Year	GER	UK	Album
"Iced Down Medallions" (Royal Flush featuring Noreaga)	1997	-	-	Ghetto Millionaire
"You Came Up" (Big Pun featuring Noreaga)	1998	—	—	Capital Punishment
"Crashin' A Party" (Lumidee featuring N.O.R.E.)	2003	23	55	Almost Famous
"Rollin" (Ron Browz featuring N.O.R.E.)	2013	—	—	Non-album single
"New York City" (Troy Ave featuring Raekwon, N.O.R.E. and Prodigy)	2013	—	—	New York City: The Album
"—" denotes a recording that did not chart or was not released in that territory.

== Guest appearances ==
List of non-single guest appearances, with other performing artists, showing year released and album name
Title	Year	Other artist(s)	Album
"What a Shame"	1997	Royal Flush	Ghetto Millionaire
"I'm Leaving"	1997	The Firm	The Album
"Blood Money Pt. 2"	1998	Nas, Nature	Ride (soundtrack)
"Thugs R Us"	1998	DJ Clue?	Streets Is Watching (soundtrack)
"Callin' (Remix)"	1998	Amari, Fatman Scoop	12"
"Shut 'Em Down" (Remix)	1998	Onyx, Big Pun	Shut 'Em Down
"Pushin' Weight" (Remix)	1998	Ice Cube, Gillie da Kid	12"
"Glory"	1998	Cam'ron	Confessions of Fire
"Thug Brothers"	1998	Funkmaster Flex, Big Pun	The Mix Tape, Vol. III
"Misery Needs Company"	1998	Fat Joe	Don Cartagena
"J-A-N-E Meets N.O.R.E."	1998	Jane Blaze	Woo (soundtrack)
"Too Old for Me (Nore & Shorty Remix)"	1998	Jerome	12"
"N.B.C."	1998	Charli Baltimore, Cam'ron	Def Jam's Rush Hour Soundtrack / Cold as Ice
"Thug Poetry"	1998	Brown & Maze	Slam: The Soundtrack
"We Can Freak It" (East Coast Remix)	1998	Kurupt, Stevie J	Kuruption!
"Give Me"	1998	A Tribe Called Quest	The Love Movement
"Come and Get With Me" (Clarkworld Remix)	1998	Keith Sweat	12"
"Movin' Out"	1998	Mýa, Raekwon	Belly (soundtrack)
"Sometimes"	1998	Maze	Belly (soundtrack)
"Clap Your Hands"	1998	Royal Flush	12"
"Next Millennium"	1998	Bounty Killer	Next Millennium
"Verbal Murder 2"	1998	Pete Rock, Big Pun, Common	Soul Survivor
"Block Party"	1998	Kid Capri, Big Pun	Soundtrack to the Streets
"We Ride"	1998	R. Kelly, Cam'ron, Jay-Z, Vegas Cats	R.
"Fantastic 4"	1998	DJ Clue?, Cam'ron, Big Pun, Canibus	The Professional
"It's Hard Being Wifee"	1999	Foxy Brown	Chyna Doll
"Firewater"	1999	Crooked Lettaz	Grey Skies / Black Mask (soundtrack)
"Why You Wanna Hate For"	1999	Memphis Bleek	Coming of Age
"I Wanna Fuck You"	1999	Scarlett	Violator: The Album
"Violators"	1999	L Boogie, Sonya Blade, Mysonne, Prodigy, Busta Rhymes	Violator: The Album
"Thugged Out"	1999	E. Money Bags, Thugged Out	In E Money Bags We Trust
"Thugs Calm Down"	1999	E. Money Bags, Nas	In E Money Bags We Trust
"Represent It"	1999	Project Pat, Tear Da Club Up Thugs	Ghetty Green
"What the Fuck?"	1999	Spice 1	Immortalized
"Police Rush the Spot"	1999	Thugged Out, Maze	Thicker than Water (soundtrack)
"Thug Onez"	2000	Half a Mill, Kool G Rap, Musalini	Milíon
"Da Heatwave"	2000	50 Cent	Power of the Dollar {unreleased}
"Rob to Eat"	2000	Caffeine	Things in the Game Done Changed
"Henny & Coke"	2000	Doo Wop, Mr. Cheeks	12"
"Dope Stories" (Remix)	2000	P.A., Big Gipp, Pimp C	My Life, Your Entertainment
"What U Rep"	2000	Prodigy	H.N.I.C.
"Fuck You At"	2000	Cam'ron	S.D.E.
"What You Git"	2000	D-Don	Bonafide: Portrait of a Hustler
"La Da Di La La La"	2000	Dame Grease, Final Chapter	Live on Lenox Ave.
"Tudunn Tudunn Tudunn (Make U Jump)"	2001	Funkmaster Flex	The Fast and the Furious (soundtrack)
"What's Going On (The Neptunes This One's for You Mix)"	2001	All-Star Tribute	12"
"Men of Business"	2001	Cuban Link, Lord Tariq, Kool G Rap, M.O.P.	24K {unreleased}
"Gorillas"	2001	Screwball, Kool G Rap	Loyalty
"Come Thru"	2001	Styles P	Violator: The Album, V2.0
"Throw It Up"	2001	Ill One	My World My Life
"We Thuggin'" (Remix)	2001	Fat Joe, Busta Rhymes, R. Kelly, Remy Martin	Jealous Ones Still Envy
"Grindin'" (Remix)	2002	Clipse, Birdman, Lil Wayne	Lord Willin'
"We Can Get It On"	2002	Angie Martinez	Animal House
"On Me"	2002	Dru Hill	Dru World Order
"N.O.R.E."	2002	Swizz Beatz	Swizz Beatz Presents G.H.E.T.T.O. Stories
"Feelin' You (Part II)"	2003	Solange	Solo Star
"I'ma Smack This Motherfucka"	2003	DJ Kay Slay	The Streetsweeper, Vol. 1
"Put 'Em Up"	2003	The Neptunes	Clones
"You Can't Fuck with Us"	2003	Too Short, Petey Pablo	Married to the Game
"Lo Rida"	2004	Eamon	I Don't Want You Back
"Capicu"	2004	Tony Touch, Fat Joe, JuJu	The Piece Maker 2
"No Problems"	2004	DJ Kay Slay, Jaheim, Nature, Left Gunz	The Streetsweeper, Vol. 2
"We Just Wanna Thug"	2004	Yukmouth, Dizzle Don	United Ghettos of America Vol. 2
"Glass of Sizzurp"	2004	Scram Jones, Cardan	Loose Cannons
"Posted" (Remix)	2004	Shawnna	Worth tha Weight
"Toma Reggaeton"	2004	Gemstar-N-Bigmato	El Puré
"Te Gusta"	2005	Tony Touch	The Reggaetony Album
"Bueno Pa' Cozar"	2005	Gemstar-N-Bigmato, Tony Touch	Mas Pure
"Dame Reggaeton"	2005	Pirate	Vol. 4: The Redemption
"Reggaetón Latino" (Chosen Few Remix)	2005	Don Omar, Fat Joe, LDA	Da Hitman Presents Reggaetón Latino
"It's R Time"	2006	Jeannie Ortega, Gem Star, Big Mato	No Place Like BKLYN
"How We Do It"	2007	High Rollers Family	Da Street Album
"You Got Me"	2007	Lumidee	Unexpected
"Dejalo"	2007	Garcia, Liza Quin	Life Unscripted
"Gaveherdat"	2007	Garcia	Life Unscripted
"Baja"	2008	Cnote	Chivalry
"Never Lie"	2008	Truth	Street Eulogy
"Bounce"	2009	MSTRKRFT, Isis	Fist of God
"Pablo Doe"	2010	Styles P & DJ Green Lantern	The Green Ghost Project
"Boss Dealings"	2012	Curren$y, Styles P	Priest Andretti
"Lyrical Workout"	2012	Freddie Foxxx, Statik Selektah	Ambition
"Rollin"	2013	Ron Browz	—N/a
"Skateboard"	2013	Pat Gallo	Fly Life Ep.1
"No Imposters"	2013	DJ Kay Slay, Trae tha Truth	Grown Man Hip Hop Part 2 (Sleepin' With The Enemy)
"Ghetto Symphony"	2013	Mack Maine, Flow, Cory Gunz	Freestyle 102: No Pens or Pads
"Weight"	2013	Mazzi, Smoke DZA	—N/a
"Manson Murder"	2013	Styles P	Float
"Valley of Kings"	2013	BSBD, SAS, Cam'ron	Celestial
"East Coast"	2013	Statik Selektah, Lil Fame	Extended Play
"Questions"	2013	Tony Touch, Al Joseph, Reek da Villian	The Piece Maker 3: Return of the 50 MC's
"Slime Pt. 2"	2013	Vado	Slime Flu 4
"It's Not a Game"	2014	DJ Kay Slay, Fat Joe, Ghostface Killah, Raekwon, Sheek Louch, McGruff, Lil' Fame, Prodigy, Rell	The Rise of a City
"No Sympathy"	2014	DJ Kay Slay, Saigon, Torch	The Rise of a City
"Head Over Heels"	2014	Avery Storm	Audiobiography
"Pass the Wire"	2014	A-Villa, Kool G Rap	Carry on Tradition
"Murda"	2014	DJ Kay Slay, Young Buck, Gunplay	The Last Hip Hop Disciple
"Drunk & High"	2014	Statik Selektah, Termanology, Reks	What Goes Around
"Off the Rip"	2015	French Montana, Chinx	Casino Life 2: Brown Bag Legend
"Monday Night Mixtape 98 Freestyle"	2015	Fabolous	Friday Night Freestyles
"Drunk & High"	2016	Termanology, Reks	Cameo King III
"Judo"	2016	Termanology	Cameo King III
"Criminal Outfit"	2017	Kool G Rap	Return of the Don
"Drinks on Me"	2017	Swissivory, Tariah, Young Noble	Real Dreams 2
"Drunk Tunes"	2018	Method Man	Meth Lab Season 2: Lithium
"My Style"	2019	Erick Sermon, Raekwon	Vernia

== See also ==
- Capone-N-Noreaga discography
