= Capone-N-Noreaga discography =

Band discography

- Studio albums: 5
- Compilation albums: 1
- Singles: 16
- Mixtapes: 2

American hip hop duo Capone-N-Noreaga have released five studio albums, one compilation album, two mixtapes, sixteen singles and five music videos.

== Albums ==
=== Studio albums ===
Title	Album details	Peak chart positions		
Title	Album details	US	US R&B	US Rap
The War Report	Released: June 17, 1997 (US); Label: Penalty; Format: CD, LP, digital download	21	4	—
The Reunion	Released: November 21, 2000 (US); Label: Tommy Boy; Formats: CD, LP, digital download	31	8	—
Channel 10	Released: March 17, 2009 (US); Label: SMC; Formats: CD, digital download	136	21	7
The War Report 2: Report the War	Released: July 13, 2010 (US); Labels: SMC, IceH²O; Formats: CD, digital download	104	19	12
Lessons	Released: July 24, 2015 (US); Label: Thugged Out Militainment; Formats: CD, digital download	—	—	—
"—" denotes a recording that did not chart.

=== Compilation albums ===
Title	Album details	Peak chart positions
Title	Album details	US R&B
The Best of Capone-N-Noreaga: Thugged da F*@# Out	Released: May 25, 2004 (US); Label: Tommy Boy; Formats: CD, digital download	70

=== Miscellaneous ===
List of miscellaneous albums, with selected information
Title	Album details	Notes
New Religion	Released: 2004 (US) (Shelved); Label: Def Jam, Thugged Out Militainment	

== Mixtapes ==
Title	Album details
Back on That Q.U. Shit	Released: June 12, 2008; Label: Self-released; Formats: Free download
Camouflage Season	Released: June 7, 2010; Label: Self-released; Formats: Free download

== Singles ==
=== As lead artist ===
Title	Year	Peak chart positions			Album
Title	Year	US Bub.	US R&B	US Rap	Album
Illegal Life (featuring Havoc and Tragedy Khadafi)	1996	—	84	18	The War Report
L.A., L.A. (featuring Mobb Deep and Tragedy Khadafi)	1996	—	— (Note: "L.A., L.A." did not enter the Hot R&B/Hip-Hop Songs chart, but peaked at number two on the Bubbling Under R&B/Hip-Hop Singles chart.)	39	The War Report
T.O.N.Y. (Top of New York) (featuring Tragedy Khadafi)	1997	3	56	16	The War Report
Closer (featuring Nneka)	1997	11	63	9	The War Report
Phonetime	2000	—	—	22	The Reunion
Y'all Don't Wanna	2001	—	71	—	The Reunion
Yes Sir	2003	—	—	—	Non-album singles
Money (featuring Shawty Lo)	2008	—	—	—	Non-album singles
Follow the Dollar	2008	—	—	—	Channel 10
Rotate (featuring Busta Rhymes and Ron Browz)	2009	—	— (Note: Rotate did not enter the Hot R&B/Hip-Hop Songs chart, but peaked at number 15 on the Bubbling Under R&B/Hip-Hop Singles chart.)	—	Channel 10
Talk to Me, Big Time	2009	—	—	—	Channel 10
Hood Pride (featuring Faith Evans)	2010	—	—	—	The War Report 2: Report the War
3 on 3 (featuring Tragedy Khadafi and The LOX)	2015	—	—	—	Lessons
Elevate (featuring Tragedy Khadafi)	2015	—	—	—	Lessons
Shooters Worldwide	2015	—	—	—	Lessons
"—" denotes a recording that did not chart.

=== As featured artist ===
Title	Year	Album
Thugmania (Rock wit Us) (Musaliny-n-Maze featuring CNN)	2001	Non-album single
Full Mode (Remix)	2002	God's Favorite
Galaxy of Queens (Nutso featuring Capone-N-Noreaga and Royal Flush)	2011	Non-album single

== Guest appearances ==
Non-single guest appearances, with other performing artists
Title	Year	Other performer(s)	Album
Thug Paradise	1997	Tragedy Khadafi	Nothing to Lose (soundtrack)
Bleeding from the Mouth	1999	The Lox	In Too Deep (soundtrack)
Thugged Out Niggas	1999	Final Chapter, Musaliny-n-Maze, Iman Thug	Violator: The Album
Thuun	1999	Funkmaster Flex, Big Kap	The Tunnel
Reunion	2000	—N/a	Any Given Sunday (soundtrack)
Don't Want Beef	2000	DJ Clue	Backstage: Music Inspired by the Film
Our Way	2000	Imam T.H.U.G.	Nas & Ill Will Records Presents QB's Finest
What Son What	2000	Funkmaster Flex	The Mix Tape, Vol. IV
I Don't Care	2001	DJ Clue	The Professional 2
Run Yo Shit	2001	Foxy Brown	Broken Silence
What u Hold Down (Capone solo)	2001	Marley Marl	Re:entry
Dyin' 4 Rap (Remix)	2001	Fredro Starr, Young Noble, Cuban Link	Firestarr
Listen Here	2001	Adam F.	Kaos: The Anti-Acoustic Album
We Gon Buck	2001	Lake, Cormega	Lake Ent. Pres.: 41st Side
My Life	2002	Kool G Rap	Soundbombing III / The Giancana Story
Love Ya Moms	2002	Complexion, Final Chapter, Oro	God's Favorite
Nahmeanuheard (Remix)	2002	Cam'ron, Fat Joe, Cassidy	God's Favorite
Stompdashitoutu	2003	M.O.P.	Cradle 2 the Grave (soundtrack)
Thug Shit, Queens Cliques	2003	The Alchemist, Kool G Rap	The Cutting Room Floor
Planet of the Apes (Capone solo)	2003	Raekwon, Sheek Louch	The Lex Diamond Story
We Do This Here	2003	Tragedy Khadafi	Thug Matrix II
Triborough	2003	Tragedy Khadafi	Thug Matrix II
Stand da Fuck Up	2005	Clinton Sparks	Maybe You Been Brainwashed
City Boys	2005	The Heatmakers	The Crack Mixtape Vol.1
Who You Frontin For?	2005	The Heatmakers	The Crack Mixtape Vol.1
Troublesome	2006	Capone	Menace II Society
Not on Our Level	2007	Sa-Ra Creative Partners	The Hollywood Recordings
Chupa Cabra	2012	Raekwon	Unexpected Victory
CNN vs. CCC	2012	Gunplay, Sho, Triple C's	Inside I’m Sufferin’ Outside I’m Stuntin’
Iron Biscuits	2013	The Alchemist	The Cutting Room Floor 3
Still Getting It	2016	N.O.R.E., Fat Joe, Jadakiss	DRUNK UNCLE

== Music videos ==
Title	Year	Director(s)
L.A., L.A. (featuring Mobb Deep and Tragedy Khadafi)	1996	Nick Quested
T.O.N.Y. (Top of New York) (featuring Tragedy Khadafi)	1996	Nick Quested
Closer (Sam Sneed Remix)	1997	Nick Quested
Phonetime	2000	Nick Quested
Y'all Don't Wanna	2000	Chris Robinson
Yes Sir	2003	Gil Green
