= Nore (disambiguation) =

The Nore is a sandbank in the Thames Estuary, England.

Nore may also refer to:

Geographical features

- River Nore, Ireland
- Pic de Nore, a mountain in the south of France

Military

- Commander-in-Chief, The Nore, former major operational command of Britain's Royal Navy
- Nore Mutiny by Royal Navy sailors in 1797

People

- Nore Davis (born 1984), American comedian
- Arne Nore (born 1946), Norwegian businessman
- Aslak Nore (born 1978), Norwegian journalist, publisher and writer
- N.O.R.E. (Victor James Santiago Jr. or "Noreaga", born 1977), American rapper

Settlements

- Nore Township, Minnesota, USA
- Nore, Norway, village in Buskerud, Norway
- Nursu, Azerbaijan, formerly called Nore
- Nore, Sweden, village in Gävleborg

Other meanings

- N.O.R.E. (album), 1998 album by Noreaga
- N.O.R.E. (song) by Noreaga

== See also ==
- Naur (disambiguation)
- Noar (disambiguation)
- Nor (disambiguation)
