= T.O.N.Y. (Top of New York) =

Single by Capone-N-Noreaga Featuring Tragedy Khadafi

from the album The War Report
- Released: February 11, 1997
- Recorded: 1996
- Genre: East Coast hip hop; hardcore hip hop
- Length: 4:28
- Songwriter(s): Carlos Broady; Percy Lee Chapman; Kiam Holley; Nashiem Myrick; Victor Santiago
- Producer(s): Nashiem Myrick & Carlos "6 July" Broady for The Hitmen

Capone-N-Noreaga Featuring Tragedy Khadafi singles chronology
"L.A., L.A." (1996)	"T.O.N.Y. (Top of New York)" (1997)	"Closer" (1997)

"T.O.N.Y. (Top of New York)" is the second single from Capone-N-Noreaga's debut album The War Report. It was released on February 11, 1997. The song features Tragedy Khadafi. The song became a critical and commercial success peaking at number 56 on the Hot R&B/Hip-Hop Singles & Tracks chart and number 16 on the Hot Rap Singles chart. The song samples "Speak Her Name" by Walter Jackson.

== Music video ==
A music video was released for this song directed by Nick Quested. The music video sees Noreaga and Tragedy rescuing Capone from being sentenced in court.

== Charts ==
Chart (1997)	Peak position
Billboard Hot R&B/Hip-Hop Singles & Tracks	56
Billboard Hot Rap Singles	16
