= Noreality =

Studio album by N.O.R.E.
- Released: August 28, 2007
- Recorded: 2005–2007
- Genre: Hip-hop
- Length: 51:26
- Label: Thugged Out; Babygrande
- Producer: Alchemist; Algado; Boola; Dakari; Dame Grease; Deacon; Hazardis Soundz; Kyze Beats; OZ; Swizz Beatz; Tony HeathCliff

N.O.R.E. chronology
N.O.R.E. y la Familia...Ya Tú Sabe (2006)	Noreality (2007)	Student of the Game (2013)

Singles from Noreality
- 1. "Set It Off" Released: 2007

Professional ratings
Review scores
Source	Rating
AllHipHop	7/10 stars
AllMusic	3/5 stars
Entertainment Weekly	B
HipHopDX	2/5
PopMatters	6/10 stars
RapReviews	6/10

Noreality is the fifth solo studio album by American rapper N.O.R.E. It was released on August 28, 2007, via N.O.R.E.'s Thugged Out Militainment and Babygrande Records. Production was handled by OZ, Deacon, Kyze Beats, Alchemist, Algado, Boola, Dakari, Dame Grease, Hazardis Soundz, Swizz Beatz and Tony HeathCliff. It features guest appearances from Deacon, Final Chapter, GLC, Jadakiss, J. Ru$$, Kanye West, KC, Kurupt, Peedi Crakk, Styles P, Swizz Beatz, Three 6 Mafia, Tru Life, and his C-N-N co-hort Capone.

The album peaked at number 31 on the Top R&B/Hip-Hop Albums and number 34 on the Independent Albums charts in the United States.

== Track listing ==
No.	Title	Writer(s)	Producer(s)	Length
1.	"Set It Off" (featuring Swizz Beatz and J. Ru$$)	Victor Santiago; Kasseem Dean; Jeffrey Jeremy Russell	Swizz Beatz	3:06
2.	"That Club Shit" (featuring Three 6 Mafia)	Santiago; Paul Beauregard; Jordan Houston; Azad Khorramian; Onrique Archie	OZ; Deacon	3:49
3.	"Throw 'Em Under the Bus" (featuring Jadakiss and Kurupt)	Santiago; Jason Phillips; Ricardo Brown; Anthony Mieles	Tony HeathCliff	3:55
4.	"Cocaine Cowboys"	Santiago; Christian Rodriguez	Hazardis Soundz	3:57
5.	"Green Light" (featuring Capone and Final Chapter)	Santiago; Kiam Holley; Brandon Burke; Allen Joseph	Algado	3:52
6.	"Pop a Pill" (featuring Deacon)	Santiago; Khorramian; Archie	OZ	4:25
7.	"Sour Diesel" (featuring Styles P)	Santiago; David Styles; Dame Grease	Dame Grease	4:01
8.	"Paternity Test"	Santiago; Kevin Ravenell	Kyze Beats	4:48
9.	"I'ma Get You" (featuring Kanye West and GLC)	Santiago; Kanye West; Leonard Harris; Alrad Lewis	Boola	3:50
10.	"Eat Pussy" (featuring Tru Life and Peedi Peedi)	Santiago; Roberto Rosado; Pedro Zayas; Khorramian; Archie	OZ; Deacon	3:26
11.	"The Rap Game"	Santiago; Ravenell	Kyze Beats	4:18
12.	"Drink Champ"	Santiago; Alan Maman	Alchemist	5:19
13.	"Shoes" (featuring KC)	Santiago; K. Douglas; Jonathan St. Aimee	Dakari	2:40
Total length:				51:26

== Charts ==
Chart (2007)	Peak position
US Top R&B/Hip-Hop Albums (Billboard)	31
US Independent Albums (Billboard)	34
