= Illegal Life =

Single by Capone-N-Noreaga featuring Tragedy Khadafi and Havoc

from the album The War Report
- B-side: "L.A., L.A."; "Stick You"
- Released: August 13, 1996
- Recorded: 1995
- Genre: East Coast hip hop; hardcore hip hop
- Length: 3:50
- Label: Penalty
- Songwriters: Percy Lee Chapman; Kiam Holley; Kejuan Muchita; Victor Santiago
- Producers: Tragedy Khadafi; Havoc (drum programming)

Capone-N-Noreaga singles chronology
"Illegal Life" (1996)	"L.A., L.A." (1996)

"Illegal Life" is the debut single by American hip hop duo Capone-N-Noreaga, released in 1996. The song is from their 1997 debut album, The War Report, and features guest appearances from fellow American rappers Havoc and Tragedy Khadafi, both of which also produced the song.

== Charts ==
Chart (1997)	Peak position
Billboard Hot R&B/Hip-Hop Singles & Tracks	84
Billboard Hot Rap Singles	18
Billboard Hot Dance Music/Maxi-Singles Sales	18
