= Nor =

Nor or NOR may refer to:

== Language ==
- Nor, a word used with "neither" in a correlative conjunction (e.g. "Neither the basketball team nor the football team is doing well.")
- Nor, a word used as a coordinating conjunction (e.g. "They do not gamble, nor do they smoke.")
- Norwegian language, by ISO 639-2 language code

== People and characters ==
- Polly Nor (born 1989), English artist
- Nór, the eponymous founder-king of Norway in Norse mythology
- Nor (Wicked), a character in the novel Wicked

== Places ==
- Nør, Danish name of Noer, Schleswig-Holstein, Germany
- Norway, a country (ISO 3166-1 alpha-3 code: NOR)

== Logic and electronics ==
- Logical NOR ("Not OR"), a binary operation in logic
  - NOR gate, an electronic gate that implements a logical NOR
  - NOR logic
- NOR flash, a type of non-volatile computer memory

== Chemistry and biology ==
- nor-, a chemical prefix for:
  - "stripped-down" molecules lacking groups (such as methyl-groups); for example, noradrenaline
  - linear chain isomer; for example, norvaline or norleucine
- Nitrite oxidoreductase, an enzyme
- Nucleolus organizer region, a chromosomal region around which the nucleolus forms in cell biology

== Transportation ==
- NOR, a Notice of Readiness (to load), or laytime, a notice from a shipowner to a charterer that the ship has arrived at the port and is ready in all respects to load or discharge
- Norfolk Orbital Railway, a proposed rail link in the English county of Norfolk
- Normanton railway station, England (National Rail station code: NOR)
- Norðfjörður Airport, by airport identifier code NOR

== Other uses ==
- Norma (constellation), by standard astronomical abbreviation Nor

== See also ==
- Naur (disambiguation)
- Noar (disambiguation)
- Nore (disambiguation)
