= Yes Sir =

Yes Sir may refer to:

- Yes Sir (web series), a 2019 Maldivian web series
- "Yes Sir", a 2003 song by Capone-N-Noreaga
- "Yes Sir", a song by The Music Explosion

== See also ==
- Yes Sir, That's My Baby (disambiguation)
- "Yes Sir, I Can Boogie", a 1977 song by Frank Dostal and Rolf Soja
- "Yessirskiii", a 2020 song by American rapper Lil Uzi Vert featuring British-American rapper 21 Savage
