= Pain, Time & Glory =

Studio album by Capone
- Released: July 12, 2005
- Studio: Facemob Studios (Houston, TX); Firehouse (New Jersey); Nexxus Studios; Sound on Sound Studios (New York, NY); The Bronxhouse (The Bronx, NY)
- Genre: Hip-hop
- Length: 1:10:54
- Label: Fastlife
- Producer: DJ Twinz; Dub Dot Z; Fredo; Nexxus Entertainment; Reefa; Roots; Screwface Music; SPK; The Heatmakerz

Capone chronology
The Reunion (2000)	Pain, Time & Glory (2005)	Menace 2 Society (2006)

Professional ratings
Review scores
Source	Rating
AllHipHop	3/5 stars
HipHopDX	3.5/5
RapReviews	6/10
Vibe	2/5

Pain, Time & Glory is the debut solo studio album by American rapper Capone. It was released on July 12, 2005 via Fast Life Music. Recording sessions took place at Facemob Studios in Houston, Firehouse in New Jersey, Nexxus Studios, Sound on Sound Studios and the Bronxhouse in New York City. Production was handled by Screwface Music, The Heatmakerz, Nexxus Entertainment, DJ Twinz, Dub Dot Z, Fredo, Reefa, Roots and SPKilla. It features guest appearances from Bun B, Butch Cassidy, C-Murder, Complexion, Da Block Militia, Devin the Dude, Raekwon, Scarface and White Chocolate.

In the United States, the album peaked at number 42 on the Top R&B/Hip-Hop Albums, number 21 on the Top Rap Albums and number 24 on the Independent Albums charts.

== Track listing ==
No.	Title	Writer(s)	Producer(s)	Length
1.	"The Release (Skit)"			0:33
2.	"Intro"	Holley; Gregory Green; Sean Thomas	The Heatmakerz	2:01
3.	"Whats My Name (Soldier's Story)"	Holley; Green; Thomas	The Heatmakerz	4:10
4.	"Where the Stuff At" (featuring C-Murder and Bun B)	Holley; Corey Miller; Bernard James Freeman; Francisco Pimentel	Nexxus Entertainment	4:02
5.	"Diet Plan"	Holley; Jeff Steinbacher	Dub Dot Z	4:10
6.	"All 4 U"	Holley; Green; Thomas	The Heatmakerz	3:11
7.	"No Where to Run" (featuring Scarface)	Holley; Eric Austin	Screwface Music	4:28
8.	"WPTG Newbreak (Skit)" (featuring White Chocolate)			1:53
9.	"It's Been a Long Time"	Holley; Austin	Screwface Music	3:58
10.	"I'm Gone" (featuring Devin the Dude and Butch Cassidy)	Holley; Austin	Screwface Music	4:56
11.	"Crack Musik" (featuring Da Block Militia)		The Heatmakerz	3:37
12.	"I'll Die for Mine" (featuring Complexion)	Holley; Edwin Almonte	SPK	4:32
13.	"The Manual"		DJ Twinz	4:36
14.	"Fuck Yo Set"	Holley; Sharif Emil Slater	Reefa	3:55
15.	"Miss My Dogs"	Holley; Kevin Ravenell; Almonte	Nexxus Entertainment	4:12
16.	"Cop Shot (Skit)"			0:50
17.	"Streets Favorite"	Holley; Pimentel; Raymond Coleman; Evan Price Jernigan; George Francis Morton	Nexxus Entertainment	2:47
18.	"Chitty Chitty Bang Bang" (featuring Raekwon)	Holley; Corey Todd Woods; Roots	Roots	3:11
19.	"U So Craaazzzy"	Holley; Austin	Screwface Music	4:14
20.	"Faith in da Streetz"	Holley; A. Rivera; C. King; S. Muir	Screwface Music; Fredo	5:38
Total length:				1:10:54

== Charts ==
Chart (2005)	Peak position
US Top R&B/Hip-Hop Albums (Billboard)	42
US Top Rap Albums (Billboard)	21
US Independent Albums (Billboard)	24
