= Noar =

Noar or NOAR may refer to:

- Amanda Noar (born 1962), British actress
- Noar Hill, a protected area in England
- Noar Linhas Aéreas, defunct Brazilian airline
- Noarlunga line (timetable code: NOAR), Adelaide, Australia

== See also ==
- Noarus, a former name of river Sava
- Naor
- Naur (disambiguation)
- Nor (disambiguation)
- Nore (disambiguation)
