= L.A., L.A. (song) =

Single by Capone-N-Noreaga featuring Mobb Deep and Tragedy Khadafi

from the album The War Report
- Released: April 1996
- Recorded: 1995
- Genre: East Coast hip-hop; hardcore hip-hop
- Length: 4:49
- Label: Penalty; Tommy Boy
- Songwriters: Percy Lee Chapman; Kiam Holley; Albert J Johnson; Kejuan Muchita; Victor Santiago
- Producer: Marley Marl

Capone-N-Noreaga singles chronology
"Illegal Life" (1996)	"L.A., L.A." (1996)	"T.O.N.Y. (Top of New York)" (1997)

Mobb Deep singles chronology
"Give Up the Goods (Just Step)" (1996)	"L.A., L.A." (1996)	"Front Lines (Hell on Earth)" (1996)

Music video
- "L.A., L.A." on YouTube

"L.A., L.A." is a song about Los Angeles by American hip hop duo Capone-N-Noreaga, featuring guest appearances from fellow American rappers Mobb Deep and Tragedy Khadafi. It was released in early 1996, as the second single from their debut album The War Report (1997).

The original version with the "New York, New York" beat was released in 1995. Soon after, Marley Marl remixed both the Kuwait and Iraq versions and both were released together in 1996.

The song was written as a response to West Coast hip hop duo Tha Dogg Pound's single "New York, New York", in which members of Tha Dogg Pound are seen knocking down buildings in New York City, in its music video.

== Background ==
Tha Dogg Pound is from California and at the height of the East Coast-West Coast Conflict many people in New York saw this as disrespect. The music video (which uses the Kuwait Mix albeit in shorter form) shows the rappers Capone N Noreaga kidnapping members of Tha Dogg Pound (Kurupt and Daz Dillinger) and putting them in the trunk of a car. Capone throws Kurupt off a roof after he attempts to escape. At the end they torture Daz to death and throw his corpse off the 59th Street Bridge.
