= 5E (album) =

Studio album by N.O.R.E.
- Released: July 27, 2018
- Recorded: 2018
- Genre: Hip hop
- Length: 40:49
- Label: Drink Champs; Thugged Out; Mass Appeal
- Producer: Hazardis Soundz; Cool & Dre; SPK; Reazy Renegade; The-Dream; Beats N Da Hood; Phokus; Swizz Beatz; Pharrell

N.O.R.E. chronology
Student of the Game (2013)	5E (2018)

Singles from 5E
- 1. "Uno Mas" Released: August 31, 2017; 2. "Don't Know" Released: July 27, 2018; 3. "Big Chain" Released: July 27, 2018

5E is the seventh and latest studio album by American rapper N.O.R.E. The album was released on July 27, 2018, by Thugged Out Militainment and Mass Appeal Records. The album features guest appearances from Fabolous, Fat Joe, Tory Lanez, The-Dream, Yung Reallie, Sevyn Streeter, Jadakiss, Wyclef Jean, Kent Jones, and Pharrell.

== Background ==
The album is a collaborative project that bridges old-school hip-hop with contemporary sounds. The album's title comes from N.O.R.E.'s apartment number, which he says is "a reference to the reality of living in the hood and having to deal with people you may not like."

== Reception ==
=== Critical response ===
The reception for N.O.R.E.'s latest album was mixed, with some calling it a welcome return and others saying it was average.

XXL praised the album as a welcome return from a veteran rapper, but noted that it was too feature-heavy and could have used more solo cuts.

HipHopDX gave the album a 3 out of 5 rating and called it average.

== Track listing ==
No.	Title	Writer(s)	Producer(s)	Length
1.	"In the Beginning"	Victor Santiago	Hazardis Soundz	1:45
2.	"Big Chain" (featuring Fabolous)	Santiago; Cool & Dre; Jackson	Cool & Dre	3:21
3.	"Bendicion" (featuring Fat Joe)	Santiago; Joseph Antonio Cartagena	Hazardis Soundz; SPK	1:59
4.	"Don't Know" (featuring Fat Joe)	Santiago; Cartagena; Reazy Renegade	Reazy Renegade	3:32
5.	"She's Mine" (featuring Tory Lanez)	Santiago; Daystar Peterson	SPK	3:56
6.	"Woof" (featuring The-Dream)	Santiago; Terius Nash	The-Dream	3:48
7.	"Let Me Be Great" (featuring Yung Reallie)	Santiago; Reallie	Beatz N Da Hood; SPK	4:34
8.	"No Reason" (featuring Sevyn Streeter)	Santiago; Streeter	SPK	3:53
9.	"Lala" (featuring Jadakiss & Wyclef Jean)	Santiago; Phillips; Nel Jean	Phokus	5:52
10.	"Parade" (featuring Kent Jones & Yung Reallie)	Santiago; Jones; Reallie	Hazardis Soundz; Swizz Beats	4:19
11.	"Uno Más" (featuring Pharrell)	Santiago; Pharrell	Pharrell	3:47
Total length:				40:49
