= N.O.R.E. y la Familia...Ya Tú Sabe =

Studio album by N.O.R.E.
- Released: September 18, 2006
- Recorded: 2004–2006
- Genres: Reggaeton; hip-hop
- Length: 64:01
- Labels: Militainment Musica; Violator; Roc La Familia; Island Def Jam
- Producers: Echo; Eliel; Luny Tunes; Menes; Monserrate & DJ Urba; Oz; Rafy Mercenario; Rique the Deacon; SPKilla

N.O.R.E. chronology
God's Favorite (2002)	N.O.R.E. y la Familia...Ya Tú Sabe (2006)	Noreality (2007)

Singles from N.O.R.E. y la Familia...Ya Tú Sabe
- 1. "Oye Mi Canto" Released: October 5, 2004

Professional ratings
Review scores
Source	Rating
AllHipHop	2.5/5 stars
AllMusic	4/5 stars
RapReviews	6.5/10

N.O.R.E. y la Familia...Ya Tú Sabe (transl. N.O.R.E. and the Family...You Already Know) is the fourth solo studio album by American rapper N.O.R.E. It was released on September 18, 2006, through Roc-La-Familia. The album marked a change in artistic direction from N.O.R.E.'s previous albums, incorporating elements of reggaeton and Latino music.

Produced by SPKilla, Echo, Eliel, Luny Tunes, Menes, Monserrate & DJ Urba, Oz, Rafy Mercenario and Rique the Deacon, it features guest appearances from Big Mato, Daddy Yankee, Don Omar, Fat Joe, Nina Sky, Veneno, LDA, Chingo Bling, Divino, Final Chapter, Frankie Negrón, Gem Star, Ivy Queen, Ja Rule, Lil Rob, Lumidee, P. Diddy, Pharrell Williams, Stef La Kallejera, Tru Life, T.O.K., Yaga & Mackie, and Zion.

In the United States, the album debuted at number 82 on the Billboard 200, number 2 on the Top Latin Albums and number 8 on the Top Rap Albums charts. Its lead single, "Oye Mi Canto", peaked at number 12 on the Billboard Hot 100.

== Track listing ==
No.	Title	Writer(s)	Producer(s)	Length
1.	"Intro"			3:49
2.	"Soy un Gangsta" (featuring Big Mato, Veneno & Tru Life)	Victor Santiago; Leonardo Vasquez; Sergio Cabral; Edwin Almonte; Thomas Sylvester Allen; Harold Ray Brown; Morris Dewayne Dickerson; Leroy Jordan; Lee Oskar Levitin; Charles Miller; Howard E. Scott	SPK	4:14
3.	"Más Maíz" (featuring Fat Joe, Big Mato, Nina Sky, Chingo Bling, Lil Rob, Negra & Lumidee)	Santiago; Joseph Cartagena; Vasquez; Natalie Albino; Pedro Herrera; Robert Flores; Lumidee Cedeño; Almonte	SPK	4:34
4.	"Y Voy" (featuring Divino)	Santiago; Daniel Velázquez; Almonte	SPK	3:42
5.	"Bailar Conmigo" (featuring Don Omar, Diddy & Big Mato)	Santiago; William Omar Landrón; Sean Combs; Vasquez; Almonte; Aaron Pena	SPK; Doble A (co.)	4:11
6.	"Skit" (featuring Stef Lakallejera)			1:44
7.	"Tráfico" (featuring Veneno)	Santiago; Cabral; Alex Antonio Monserrate Sosa	Monserrate & DJ Urba	3:11
8.	"Vente Mami" (featuring Zion & Pharrell)	Santiago; Félix Ortiz; Pharrell Williams; Francisco Saldaña; Víctor Cabrera	Luny Tunes	3:32
9.	"Tienes a Otra" (featuring Ivy Queen & Big Mato)	Santiago; Martha Pesante; Vasquez	Rafy Mercenario	2:56
10.	"Dímelo" (featuring Daddy Yankee)	Santiago; Ramón Luis Ayala; Paul Frederick Irizarry Suau; Eduardo Lopez	Echo; Menes; SPK	4:14
11.	"Hablar de Amor" (featuring Frankie Negrón)	Santiago; Frankie Negrón; Almonte	SPK	4:28
12.	"Big It Up" (featuring T.O.K. & Big Mato)	Santiago; Alistaire McCalla; Roshaun Clarke; Craig Thompson; Xavier Davidson; Vasquez; Almonte	SPK	4:10
13.	"P'alla Yo Voy" (featuring Yaga & Mackie)	Santiago; Javier Martinez; Luis Pizarro; Almonte	SPK	3:45
14.	"Cuchi" (featuring Big Mato & Ja Rule)	Santiago; Vasquez; Jeffrey Atkins; Almonte	SPK	3:32
15.	"Oye Mi Canto" (featuring Daddy Yankee, Nina Sky, Gem Star & Big Mato)	Santiago; Ayala; Natalie Albino; Nicole Albino; Rolphy Ramirez; Vasquez; Almonte	SPK	4:00
16.	"Reggaetón Latino (Chosen Few Remix)" (featuring Don Omar, Fat Joe & LDA)	Santiago; Landrón; Cartagena	Eliel	4:50
17.	"Go In" (featuring Final Chapter)	Santiago; Allen Everett Joseph; Brandon Burke	Oz; Rique the Deacon	3:09
Total length:				64:01

== Charts ==
Chart (2006)	Peak position
US Billboard 200	82
US Top Latin Albums (Billboard)	2
US Top Rap Albums (Billboard)	8
