= Student of the Game =

Studio album by N.O.R.E. aka P.A.P.I.
- Released: April 16, 2013
- Recorded: 2011–2013
- Genre: Hip hop
- Length: 53:29
- Label: Thugged Out; eOne
- Producer: Charli Brown Beatz; Cookin' Soul; DJ Thoro; Hazardis Soundz; Illa, Inf; Jahlil Beats; Large Professor; Pete Rock; Pharrell; Scram Jones

N.O.R.E. aka P.A.P.I. chronology
| Noreality (2007) | Student of the Game (2013) | Drunk Uncle (2016) |

Singles from Student of the Game
- 1. "Tadow" Released: January 5, 2013; 2. "Fowl Niggaz" Released: February 25, 2013; 3. "The Problem (Lawwddd)" Released: March 25, 2013

Student of the Game is the sixth studio album by American rapper N.O.R.E.. The album was released on April 16, 2013, by Thugged Out Militainment and eOne Music. The album features guest appearances from French Montana, 2 Chainz, Lil Wayne, Pusha T, Pharrell, Pete Rock, Havoc, Jeremih, Mick Jones, Large Professor, Swizz Beatz, Raekwon, Tech N9ne, Busta Rhymes and Scarface among others.

== Background ==
The album was originally titled N.O.R.E. Pt. 2: Born Again (the album was intended to be a sequel to Noreaga's debut album N.O.R.E.). However, the title was later changed to S.U.P.E.R.T.H.U.G., referencing his 1998 hit single "Superthug". However, N.O.R.E. later announced that he had changed the title to Student of the Game, on the advice of the film company producing the movie Super Thug, which he intended to premiere following the release of the album, as the film would contain no music from the album.

Mentioned guest appearances on the album included Lil Wayne, Pharrell Williams, Busta Rhymes, Cory Gunz, and he also expressed wanting to work with Saigon, on a Just Blaze beat on the album, in which Just Blaze responded to, and gladly accepted.

== Singles ==
The first promotional single from the album was "Nutcracker". The song credits Flavor Flav as a feature on the song, but his part is a sample from Public Enemy's song "Can't Do Nuttin' for Ya, Man", but he appears in the music video. The promo single "Finito", featuring Pharrell Williams and Lil Wayne, was released on June 13, 2011. On September 17, 2011, the music video for "Finito" featuring Pharrell Williams and Lil Wayne was released.

On January 5, 2013, the first official single "Tadow" featuring French Montana, Pusha T and 2 Chainz was released. On January 5, 2013, the song "Built Pyramids" featuring Large Professor was released. On January 6, 2013, the music video was released for "Tadow" featuring French Montana, Pusha T and 2 Chainz. On February 25, 2013, the second single "Fowl Niggaz" was released. On March 17, 2013, the music video for "Built Pyramids" featuring Large Professor was released. The third single "The Problem (Lawwddd)" featuring Pharrell was released on March 25, 2013. On April 15, 2013, the music video was released for "Dreaming" featuring Tech N9ne and ¡Mayday!. On June 11, 2013, the music video for "The Problem (Lawwwddd)" featuring Pharrell was released.

== Reception ==
=== Commercial performance ===
Student of the Game debuted at number 116 on the Billboard 200 selling 4,100 copies in its first week of release.

=== Critical response ===
Professional ratings
Review scores
| Source | Rating |
|---|---|
| AllMusic | 3/5 stars |
| HipHopDX | 3/5 stars |

Student of the Game received mixed reviews from music critics. Bruce Smith of HipHopDX gave the album three out of five stars, saying "N.O.R.E tries to recreate “Banned From T.V.” with “Faces of Death.” The features of Raekwon, French Montana, Busta Rhymes and Swizz Beatz can't match the original lineup of Nature, Big Punisher, Styles and Jadakiss. The beat composed by Jahlil Beats doesn't give off the epic feel Swizz did on the original. Student of the Game has its moments, but they are few and far between, lost amongst filler, comical skits, and some very poor attempts of to keep up with what is popular now. N.O.R.E doesn't have to prove anything to anyone, and his attempts to do so drag this album down."

== Track listing ==
| No. | Title | Writer(s) | Producer(s) | Length |
|---|---|---|---|---|
| 1. | "Kenny Smith Speaks" | | | 0:15 |
| 2. | "Student of the Game" | Victor Santiago | Cookin' Soul | 2:39 |
| 3. | "Tadow" (featuring French Montana, 2 Chainz & Pusha T) | Santiago; Karim Kharbouch; Tauheed Epps; Terrence Thornton; Ray Fraser; Shandel Green | Illa; Infa | 4:09 |
| 4. | "Hang Hang Resume" | | | 1:48 |
| 5. | "The Problem (Lawwwddd)" (featuring Pharrell) | Santiago; Pharrell Williams | Pharrell | 3:30 |
| 6. | "What I Had to Do" (featuring Scarface) | Santiago; Brad Jordan; Edwin Almonte | SPK | 3:04 |
| 7. | "Victor Cruz Speaks" | | | 0:15 |
| 8. | "Vitamins" (featuring Pete Rock) | Santiago; Peter Phillips | Pete Rock | 3:41 |
| 9. | "Thirsty" | Santiago; C Barrionuevo JR. | Charli Brown Beatz | 3:12 |
| 10. | "Scott Disick Speaks" | | | 0:29 |
| 11. | "Fowl Niggaz" | Santiago; Fresser; Green | Illa; Infa | 2:20 |
| 12. | "She Tried" (featuring Lil Wayne) | Santiago; Fresser; Green; Dwayne Carter | Illa; Infa | 2:40 |
| 13. | "Camouflage Unicorns" (featuring Tragedy Khadafi & Havoc) | Santiago; Percy Chapman; Kejuan Muchita; Marc Shemer | Scram Jones; DJ Thoro | 3:20 |
| 14. | "Only Bad Ones" (featuring Jeremih) | Santiago; Jeremih Felton; C Barrionuevo JR. | Charli Brown Beatz | 4:12 |
| 15. | "God’s Angel" (featuring Mick Jones & Chris Jones) | Santiago; Christian Rodriguez | Hazardis Soundz | 3:31 |
| 16. | "Built Pyramids" (featuring Large Professor) | Santiago; William Mitchell | Large Professor | 4:28 |
| 17. | "Faces of Death" (featuring French Montana, Swizz Beatz, Raekwon & Busta Rhymes) | Santiago; Kharbouch; Kasseem Dean; Corey Woods; Trevor Smith; Orlando Tucker | Jahlil Beats | 4:15 |
| 18. | "Drunkerer" | | | 1:50 |
| 19. | "Dreaming" (featuring ¡Mayday! & Tech N9ne) | Santiago; C. Barrionuevo JR.; Aaron Yates | Charli Brown Beatz | 3:50 |
| Total length: | | | | 53:29 |

Sample credits

- "Faces of Death" contains a sample of "Banned from T.V.", as performed by Noreaga and produced by Swizz Beatz.
