= The Cutting Room Floor (mixtape) =

Mixtape by the Alchemist
- Released: 2003
- Recorded: 2002 – 2003
- Genre: Hip-hop
- Length: 44:05
- Label: ALC Records
- Producer: The Alchemist

The Alchemist chronology
The Ultimate Music Machine (2002)	The Cutting Room Floor (2003)	Insomnia (2003)

Professional ratings
Review scores
Source	Rating
RapReviews	7.5/10 stars

The Cutting Room Floor is the debut mixtape by the Alchemist released in 2003 by ALC Records.

== Track listing ==
All tracks produced by The Alchemist, except track 4 and track 8, which were produced by Havoc.

1. "Intro"
2. "Street Team (Remix)" [feat. M.O.P. & Kool G Rap]
3. "Friday Night Flavas"
4. "Walk With Me" [performed by Havoc]
5. "Deep Meditation" (feat. Lil' Dap)
6. "Mobb Show Intro"
7. "Still in Effect" (feat. Freeway)
8. "First to Drop a Beat the Boldest" [performed by Havoc & G.O.D. Pt. 3]
9. "In Jail" (feat. Nashawn)
10. "P Broke the Switch" (feat. Prodigy)
11. "Thug Shit, Queens Cliques" (feat. Kool G Rap & Capone-N-Noreaga)
12. "Friday Night Flavas Pt. 2"
13. "Thieves" (feat. Dilated Peoples & Prodigy)
14. "That's My Style" (feat. Big Noyd)
15. "Stay Bent" (feat. Inspectah Deck)
16. "Backwards" (feat. Mobb Deep)
17. "Kay Slay Shit" (feat. Infamous Mobb & Chinky)
