= Melvin Flynt – Da Hustler =

Studio album by Noreaga
- Released: August 24, 1999
- Recorded: 1998–1999
- Studio: The Hit Factory (New York, NY); Sound On Sound (New York, NY); Criteria Studios (Miami, FL)
- Genre: Gangsta rap
- Length: 1:10:23
- Label: Thugged Out; Penalty; Violator; Tommy Boy
- Producer: Anthony Barners; Charly "Suga Bear" Charles; EZ Elpee; Jamal Edgerton; Mannie Fresh; SPKilla; Swizz Beatz; The Neptunes; Trackmasters

Noreaga chronology
N.O.R.E. (1998)	Melvin Flynt – Da Hustler (1999)	God's Favorite (2002)

Singles from Melvin Flynt - Da Hustler
- 1. "Oh No" Released: September 14, 1999; 2. "Blood Money Pt. 3" Released: 1999

Melvin Flynt – Da Hustler is the second studio album by American rapper Noreaga. It was released on August 24, 1999, by Penalty Recordings. Recording sessions took place at The Hit Factory and Sound on Sound Studios in New York and at Criteria Studios in Miami. Production was handled by SPKilla, Ez Elpee, The Neptunes, Trackmasters, Anthony Barners, Charly "Suga Bear" Charles, Jamal Edgerton, Mannie Fresh and Swizz Beatz. It features guest appearances from Musaliny-N-Maze, Final Chapter, Goldfingaz, Juvenile, Kelis, Lil Wayne, Mike B., Missy Elliott, Scarlet O'Harlem and Troy Outlaw.

The album debuted at number 9 on the Billboard 200 and number 3 on the Top R&B/Hip-Hop Albums in the United States. On October 27, 1999, it received a Gold status by the Recording Industry Association of America (RIAA) for selling 500,000 certified units.

Melvin Flynt – Da Hustler was Noreaga's last album before adopting his current moniker, N.O.R.E..

== Critical reception ==
Professional ratings
Review scores
Source	Rating
AllMusic	3/5 stars
NME	4/5 stars
Rolling Stone	3.5/5 stars
The Source	3/5 stars
XXL	L (3/5)

Nathan Rabin of The A.V. Club wrote: "Melvin Flynt's formula proves promising and frustrating in equal measures, as Noreaga's engagingly demented flow struggles to compensate for the tiresome subject matter". Soren Baker of Chicago Tribune wrote that "Noreaga tackles familiar topics—inferior rappers, corrupt police—yet his signature off-pace delivery and the lethal beats backing him more than compensate for his typical lyrical fare".

== Track listing ==
No.	Title	Writer(s)	Producer(s)	Length
1.	"Hospital / Funeral Intro"			3:42
2.	"Sometimes" (featuring Maze)	Victor Santiago; Michael Allen; Lamont Porter; Jerry Peters	EZ Elpee	5:03
3.	"Gangsta's Watch"	Santiago; Edwin Almonte; Manuel Álvarez-Beigbeder Pérez; Ana Magdalena	SPK	3:55
4.	"Da Hustla" (featuring Musaliny-N-Maze)	Santiago; Musa Abdallah; Allen; Jean-Claude Olivier; Samuel Barnes	Poke & Tone	3:31
5.	"Cocaine Business (Hysteria)" (featuring Kelis)	Santiago; Pharrell Williams; Chad Hugo; Lawrence Parker; Scott Sterling	The Neptunes	4:13
6.	"The Pigeon (Skit)" (featuring Mike B. (removed from the clean version))			1:07
7.	"Blood Money Pt. 3" (performed by Capone-N-Noreaga)	Santiago; Porter; Michael Dunford; Betty Mary Thatcher	EZ Elpee	3:49
8.	"Wethuggedout" (featuring Missy "Misdemeanor" Elliott)	Santiago; Melissa Elliott; Kaseem Dean	Swizz Beatz	4:54
9.	"Going Legit" (featuring Musaliny)	Santiago; Abdallah; Almonte	SPK	3:53
10.	"Real or Fake Niggas" (featuring Final Chapter)	Santiago; Allen Joseph; Brandon Burke; Charly Charles	Suga Bear	3:34
11.	"What the Fuck Is Up?" (featuring Scarlet O' Harlem)	Santiago; Olivier; Barnes	Poke & Tone; Anthony Barners; Jamal Edgerton	3:48
12.	"First Day Home"	Santiago; Almonte	SPK	4:05
13.	"Da Tunnel (Skit)" (removed from the clean version)			1:01
14.	"Hold Me Down" (featuring Final Chapter and Troy Outlaw)	Santiago; Joseph; Burke; Almonte	SPK	4:46
15.	"If U Want It"	Santiago; Almonte	SPK	4:20
16.	"Oh No"	Santiago; Williams; Hugo	The Neptunes	4:31
17.	"Play That Shit" (featuring Lil Wayne, Juvenile, Musaliny-N-Maze, and Goldfingaz)	Santiago; Dwayne Carter; Terius Gray; Abdallah; Allen; Byron Thomas	Mannie Fresh	3:39
18.	"Flagrant Cops"	Santiago; Almonte; Maurice White	SPK	4:29
19.	"Animal Thug Goes Hollywood (Skit)" (removed from the clean version)			2:03
Total length:				1:10:23

Sample credits

- Track 2 contains a sample of "One More Time for Love", written by Jerry Peters, as performed by Syreeta.
- Track 3 contains a sample of "Frente a Frente", written by Manuel Alejandro and Ana Magdalena, as performed by Jeanette.
- Track 5 contains an interpolation of "Illegal Business", written by Scott Sterling and Lawrence Parker.
- Track 7 contains a re-play of "Can You Understand", written by Michael Dunford and Betty Mary Thatcher.
- Track 18 contains a re-played portion of "Brazilian Rhyme", written by Maurice White.

== Charts ==
Chart (1999)	Peak position
Canadian Albums (Billboard)	20
US Billboard 200	9
US Top R&B Albums (Billboard)	3

== Certifications ==
Region	Certification	Certified units/sales
United States (RIAA)	Gold	500,000^{^}
^{^} Shipments figures based on certification alone.
