= Yes Sir, That's My Baby =

Yes Sir, That's My Baby or variants may refer to:

- "Yes Sir, That's My Baby" (song), a 1925 originally English-language song by Gus Kahn and Walter Donaldson
- Yes Sir, That's My Baby (film), a 1949 film
- Yessir, That's My Baby (album), a 1978 Count Basie and Oscar Peterson album

== See also ==
- That's My Baby (disambiguation)
- Yes Sir (disambiguation)
