= Closer (Capone-N-Noreaga song) =

Single by Capone-N-Noreaga featuring Nneka

from the album The War Report
- B-side: "Closer" (Sam Sneed remix)
- Released: 1997
- Genre: East Coast hip hop
- Length: 4:05
- Songwriters: Bernard LeonJackson Jr; Edward David Townsend; Victor Santiago
- Producers: DJ Clark Kent; Sam Sneed

Closer is the third single from Capone-N-Noreaga's debut album The War Report. The song samples "Closer Than Friends" by Surface and "Promise Me" by Luther Vandross. All of the verses in the song are performed by Noreaga whilst singer Nneka performs the hook.

== Music video ==
A music video, directed by Diane Martel, was released for the Sam Sneed remix of the song. Towards the end of the video the song switches to another song on the album called "Driver's Seat". Capone does not rap nor appear in the video.

== Charts ==
| Chart (1997) | Peak position |
|---|---|
| Billboard Hot R&B/Hip-Hop Singles & Tracks | 63 |
| Billboard Hot Rap Singles | 9 |
