= That's My Baby =

That's My Baby may refer to:

- That's My Baby (1926 film), a silent comedy
- That's My Baby! (1944 film), directed by William Berke
- That's My Baby! (1984 film), a comedy directed by John Bradshaw and Edie Yolles
- That's My Baby (TV series), an American TV program on Animal Planet
- "That's My Baby" (song), a song by Lari White from the album Wishes

== See also ==
- Yes Sir, That's My Baby (disambiguation)
