= Banned from T.V. =

Single by Noreaga featuring Big Pun, Nature, Cam'ron, Jadakiss, and Styles P

from the album N.O.R.E.
- Released: July 28, 1998
- Recorded: 1998
- Genre: East Coast hip-hop; hardcore hip-hop
- Length: 5:12
- Label: Tommy Boy Records
- Songwriters: V. Santiago; C. Rios; J. Baxter; J. Phillips; D. Styles; C. Giles; K. Dean
- Producer: Swizz Beatz

Noreaga singles chronology
"N.O.R.E." (1998)	"Banned from T.V." (1998)	"You Came Up" (1998)

Big Pun singles chronology
"Still Not a Player" (1998)	"Banned from T.V." (1998)	"You Came Up" (1998)

Nature singles chronology
"Banned from T.V." (1998)

Cam'ron singles chronology
"Horse & Carriage" (1998)	"Banned from T.V." (1998)	"Feels Good" (1998)

Jadakiss singles chronology
"Banned from T.V." (1998)	"Ruff Ryders' Anthem (Remix)" (1999)

Styles P singles chronology
"Banned from T.V." (1998)	"Ruff Ryders' Anthem (Remix)" (1999)

"Banned from T.V." is a song by American rapper Noreaga, released as the third single from his debut studio album N.O.R.E. (1998). The song, produced by then up-and-coming record producer Swizz Beatz, is a posse cut featuring guest appearances from fellow New York–based rappers Nature, Big Pun, Cam'ron, Jadakiss and Styles P. The song contains a sample of "Also sprach Zarathustra", as performed by Richard Strauss.

== Background and legacy ==
Swizz Beatz initially composed the "Banned from T.V." instrumental with an additional section: the final version is a loop of what was only intended to be the song's intro. Noreaga retrospectively described the original version as "one of the most amazing beats in the world" and wrote lyrics to it, but during the recording session he and Nature instead rapped over the intro loop rather than the full instrumental.

In a 2014 interview, N.O.R.E. revealed Big Pun's appearance on the song was not originally intended: "Actually, Pun bullied his way on there. I had Nature on there, and Pun was in the studio. I went to take a shit, and Pun snuck himself on there. I wanted to erase [Pun's verse] 'cause he violated. But I never did erase it. That was always my brother."

The song was sampled by Lil Wayne in his song "Banned from NO" and Lil Uzi Vert sampled it in his song of the same name .

== Music video ==
The music video for the song was directed by Director X. In 2013, nearly fifteen years later, in promotion for his sixth studio album Student of the Game, N.O.R.E. liberated behind-the-scenes footage of the music video for "Banned from T.V.".

== Charts ==
Chart (1998)	Peak position
UK Singles Chart	103
