= The War Report 2: Report the War =

Studio album by Capone-N-Noreaga
- Released: July 13, 2010
- Recorded: 2009–2010
- Genre: East Coast hip-hop; hardcore hip-hop; gangsta rap
- Length: 62:55
- Label: Thugged Out; Ice H20; EMI 50999 6 42802 2 6 E2-42802
- Producer: Alchemist; AraabMuzik; BT; Buckwild; DJ Green Lantern; Dreddy K. Amarae; Hazardis Soundz; Kyze; M3; Neo Da Matrix; Scram Jones; SPKilla; Tha Bizness; Tony Heathcliff

Capone-N-Noreaga chronology
Channel 10 (2009)	The War Report 2: Report the War (2010)	Lessons (2015)

Singles from The War Report 2: Report the War
- 1. "Hood Pride" Released: June 8, 2010

Professional ratings
Review scores
Source	Rating
AllMusic	3.5/5 stars
HipHopDX	3.5/5
Juice	4/6
RapReviews	8/10

The War Report 2: Report the War is the fourth studio album by American hip hop duo Capone-N-Noreaga. It was released on July 13, 2010, via N.O.R.E.'s Thugged Out Militainment, Raekwon's Ice H20 Records, and EMI Records. Production was handled by Scram Jones, Alchemist, AraabMuzik, BT, Buckwild, DJ Green Lantern, Dreddy K. Amarae, Hazardis Soundz, Kyze, M3, Neo Da Matrix, SPKilla, Tha Bizness and Tony Heathcliff. It features guest appearances from Ice H20 founder Raekwon, Avery Storm, Busta Rhymes, Faith Evans, Imam Thug, Musaliny, Nas and The Lox.

Serving as a sequel to the duo's 1997 debut, The War Report, the album peaked at number 104 on the Billboard 200, number 19 on the Top R&B/Hip-Hop Albums, number 12 on the Top Rap Albums and number 10 on the Independent Albums charts in the United States. The first single from the album, "Hood Pride", was released on June 8, 2010. A video was released for "Pain" on July 11, 2010. Another video was released for "My Attribute" on July 12, 2010. A video was also released for the lead single on August 18, 2010.

== Track listing ==
No.	Title	Writer(s)	Producer(s)	Length
1.	"Pain"	Kiam Holley; Victor Santiago; Alan Maman	Alchemist	5:01
2.	"Bodega Stories" (featuring The Lox)	Holley; Santiago; David Styles; Jason Phillips; Sean Jacobs; Marc Shemer	Scram Jones	4:52
3.	"Dutches vs. Phillies vs. Bamboo" (featuring Raekwon)	Holley; Santiago; Corey Woods; Shemer	Scram Jones	4:50
4.	"My Attribute"	Holley; Santiago; Dreddy K. Amarae	Dreddy K. Amarae	3:55
5.	"Favor for a Favor"	Holley; Santiago; Daniel Berger	B.T.	3:13
6.	"Hood Pride" (featuring Faith Evans)	Holley; Santiago; Faith Evans; Qaadir Atkinson	Neo Da Matrix	3:49
7.	"The Reserves" (featuring Raekwon)	Holley; Santiago; Woods; Justin Henderson	Tha Bizness	2:53
8.	"With Me" (featuring Nas)	Holley; Santiago; Nasir Jones; Anthony Best	Buckwild	5:09
9.	"Live On, Live Long Part II"	Holley; Santiago; Edwin Almonte	SPK	3:05
10.	"The Oath" (featuring Raekwon and Busta Rhymes)	Holley; Santiago; Woods; Trevor Smith; Christian Rodriguez	Hazardis Soundz	5:13
11.	"Brother from Another"	Holley; Santiago; Kevin Ravenell	Kyze	4:21
12.	"Thug Planet" (featuring Imam T.H.U.G. and Musaliny)	Holley; Santiago; Anthony Mieles	Tony Heathcliff	4:22
13.	"Scarface"	Holley; Santiago; Abraham Orellana	araabMUZIK	2:42
14.	"The Corner" (featuring Avery Storm)	Holley; Santiago; Jean Louhisdon	M3	3:16
15.	"Obituary"	Holley; Santiago	DJ Green Lantern	6:14
Total length:				1:02:55

== Personnel ==
- Kiam "Capone" Holley – vocals, executive producer
- Victor "N.O.R.E." Santiago – vocals, executive producer, design
- David "Styles P" Styles – vocals (track 2)
- Jason "Jadakiss" Phillips – vocals (track 2)
- Sean "Sheek Louch" Jacobs – vocals (track 2)
- Corey "Raekwon" Woods – vocals (tracks: 3, 7, 10), executive producer
- Faith Evans – vocals (track 6)
- Nasir "Nas" Jones – vocals (track 8)
- Trevor "Busta Rhymes" Smith – vocals (track 10), executive producer
- Michael "Imam T.H.U.G." Butler – vocals (track 12)
- Musa "Musaliny" Abdallah – vocals (track 12)
- Ralph "Avery Storm" Di Stasio – vocals (track 14)
- Daniel Alan "The Alchemist" Maman – producer (track 1)
- Marc "Scram Jones" Shemer – producer (tracks: 2, 3), A&R
- Dreddy K. Amarae – producer (track 4)
- Daniel "BT" Berger – producer (track 5)
- Qaadir "Neo Da Matrix" Atkinson – producer (track 6)
- Justin "J-Hen" Henderson – producer (track 7)
- Anthony "Buckwild" Best – producer (track 8)
- Edwin "SPK" Almonte – producer & mixing (track 9)
- Christian "Hazardis Soundz" Rodriguez – producer (track 10), recording, mixing (tracks: 1–8, 10–15)
- Kevin "Kyze" Ravenell – producer (track 11)
- Anthony "Tony Heathcliff" Mieles – producer (track 12)
- Abraham "araabMUZIK" Orellana – producer (track 13)
- Jean "Jiv Pos" Louhisdon – producer (track 14)
- James "DJ Green Lantern" D'Agostino – producer (track 15)
- Tim Saroce – editing
- Mark B. Christensen – mastering
- Daniel Fry – mastering assistant
- Kareem "Kay" Woods – co-executive producer
- Mel Carter – co-executive producer
- Chris Nipz – design, layout
- Don Woods – A&R

== Charts ==
Chart (2010)	Peak position
US Billboard 200	104
US Top R&B/Hip-Hop Albums (Billboard)	19
US Top Rap Albums (Billboard)	12
US Independent Albums (Billboard)	10
