= Lessons (album) =

Studio album by Capone-N-Noreaga
- Released: July 24, 2015
- Recorded: 2014–2015
- Genre: East Coast hip hop
- Length: 51:29
- Label: Thugged Out; Penalty
- Producer: Ayatollah; Beatz n da Hood; Hazardis Soundz; iFresh; Jahlil Beats; Large Professor; Mr. Authentic; Scram Jones; SPK; Statik Selektah

Capone-N-Noreaga chronology
| The War Report 2: Report the War (2010) | Lessons (2015) |

Singles from Lessons
- 1. "3 on 3" Released: May 7, 2015; 2. "Elevate" Released: May 14, 2015; 3. "Shooters Worldwide" Released: May 14, 2015

Lessons is the fifth studio album by American hip hop duo Capone-N-Noreaga. The album was released on July 24, 2015, by Thugged Out Militainment and Penalty Records. The album features guest appearances from fellow American rappers Tragedy Khadafi, Royal Flush, The LOX and Raekwon. The album includes production from American record producers Ayatollah, Jahlil Beats, Large Professor, Scram Jones and Statik Selektah, among others.

== Background ==
After disbanding for the second time in 2011, the rappers announced in 2013 that they would once again be reuniting. On May 4, 2015, the duo announced that the title of their fifth album would be Lessons. Capone-N-Noreaga also unveiled the album's cover art and tracklist. The duo also revealed that they would be partnering with Penalty Records, the label that released their 1997 debut album The War Report.

== Singles ==
The album's first single, "3 on 3", was released on May 7, 2015.

== Track listing ==
| No. | Title | Producer(s) | Length |
|---|---|---|---|
| 1. | "Khadafi Talks (performed by Tragedy Khadafi)" | Tragedy Khadafi | 1:54 |
| 2. | "Future" (featuring Tragedy Khadafi) | Ayatollah | 3:22 |
| 3. | "In the 1st" | iFresh | 2:05 |
| 4. | "Shooters Worldwide" | Jahlil Beats | 3:23 |
| 5. | "7 Continents" (featuring Royal Flush and Tragedy Khadafi) | Hazardis Soundz | 4:03 |
| 6. | "U.M.A.R." (featuring Tragedy Khadafi) | SPK | 4:15 |
| 7. | "Gumar Oz Dubar" | Hazardis Soundz | 2:40 |
| 8. | "Not Stick You Pt. 2" (featuring Tragedy Khadafi) | Ayatollah | 3:38 |
| 9. | "Chinese Girl" | Beatz n da Hood | 3:36 |
| 10. | "Elevate" (featuring Tragedy Khadafi) | Hazardis Soundz | 3:26 |
| 11. | "3 on 3" (featuring Tragedy Khadafi and The LOX) | Beatz n da Hood | 3:43 |
| 12. | "Now" (featuring Tragedy Khadafi) | Statik Selektah | 3:20 |
| 13. | "Pizza" | Large Professor | 2:42 |
| 14. | "Riding" (featuring Anna Shay) | Mr. Authentic | 4:19 |
| 15. | "Foul 120" (featuring Tragedy Khadafi and Raekwon) | Scram Jones | 4:37 |

Leftover track

- "Rap Rushmore" (featuring Nature and Cormega)
