= God's Favorite (album) =

Studio album by N.O.R.E.
- Released: June 25, 2002
- Recorded: 2001–02
- Studios: The Room Lab (Hackensack, NJ); Master Sound Recording Studio (Virginia Beach, VA); South Beach Studios (Miami, FL); Quad Studios (New York, NY); Crackhouse Studios (New York, NY); Right Track Studio (New York, NY); Troposphere Studios (Livingston, NJ); Sony Music Studios (New York, NY); South Coast Recordings (Friendswood, TX)
- Genre: Hip-hop
- Length: 76:35
- Labels: Thugged Out; Violator; Def Jam; Island Def Jam
- Producers: EZ Elpee; Irv Gotti; K-Yze; L.E.S.; SPKilla; Swizz Beatz; The Neptunes; Yogi "Sugar Bear" Graham

N.O.R.E. chronology
Melvin Flynt – Da Hustler (1999)	God's Favorite (2002)	N.O.R.E. y la Familia...Ya Tú Sabe (2006)

Singles from God's Favorite
- 1. "Grimey" Released: October 9, 2001; 2. "Live My Life" Released: December 18, 2001; 3. "Nothin'" Released: May 14, 2002; 4. "Full Mode" Released: November 12, 2002

Professional ratings
Review scores
Source	Rating
AllMusic	4/5 stars
HipHopDX	2.5/5
NME	3.5/5 stars
RapReviews	6/10
Rolling Stone	3/5 stars
Spin	6/10
Vibe	3/5 marks

God's Favorite is the third studio album by American rapper N.O.R.E. After six months of label delays, the album was released on June 25, 2002, by Thugged Out Entertainment and Def Jam Recordings.

The album peaked at number 3 on the Billboard 200 albums chart moving 118,000 units in its first week of release. In its second week of release, the album sold 64,000 additional copies and dropped to number 8 on the Billboard 200.

It was supported with four singles: "Grimey", "Live My Life", "Nothin'" and "Full Mode". The single "Nothin'" reached No. 10 on the Billboard Hot 100, becoming the rapper's biggest hit single and his only to reach the Top 10.

== Background ==
Originally scheduled for a December 4, 2001 release, the album was delayed to a February 2002 release. The album was ultimately released on June 25, 2002.

Recording sessions took place at The Room Lab in Hackensack, at Mastersound Studio in Virginia Beach, at South Beach Studios in Miami, at Quad Recording Studios, The Crackhouse, Right Track Recording and Sony Music Studios in New York City, at Troposphere Studios in Livingston, and at South Coast Recorders in Friendswood. Production was handled by The Neptunes, Swizz Beatz, SPKilla, K-Yze, Ez Elpee, Irv Gotti, L.E.S. and Yogi Bear.

It features guest appearances from his C-N-N groupmate Capone, Musaliny-N-Maze, Complexion, Gold Oro, DWNLZY, Final Chapter, Ja Rule, Kelis, Mashonda, Troy Outlaw, Busta Rhymes, Cam'ron, Cassidy, Chinky, Fat Joe, Ice-T, Jadakiss, Mike Kyser, Nas, Nelly, Tyson Beckford and Latricia Thompson.

== Track listing ==
No.	Title	Writer(s)	Producer(s)	Length
1.	"Hit Me Slime" (featuring Nas, Ice-T, Mike Kyser, Nelly and Tyson Beckford)			2:27
2.	"God's Favorite"	Victor Santiago; Kevin Ravenell	Kyze	2:01
3.	"Nothin'" (featuring Pharrell Williams)	Santiago; Pharrell Williams; Chad Hugo	The Neptunes	4:24
4.	"Grimey"	Santiago; Williams; Hugo	The Neptunes	4:09
5.	"Nahmeanuheard" (featuring DWNLZY)	Santiago; Timothy Barclift; Kaseem Dean	Swizz Beatz	4:28
6.	"Mr. CEO" (featuring Musaliny-N-Maze, Gold Oro and Troy Outlaw)	Santiago; Musa Abdallah; Michael Allen; Wilber Spady; Troy Muldrow; Ravenell	Kyze	5:02
7.	"Big D" (featuring Akinyele, Heather Hunter and Kia)	Santiago; Akinyele Adams; Lamont Porter	EZ Elpee	5:28
8.	"Live My Life" (featuring Ja Rule)	Santiago; Jeffrey Atkins; Irving Lorenzo	Irv Gotti	5:15
9.	"Full Mode"	Santiago; Williams; Hugo	The Neptunes	3:52
10.	"Love Ya Moms" (performed by Capone-N-Noreaga, Musaliny-N-Maze, Gold Oro and Complexion)	Santiago; Kiam Holley; Abdallah; Allen; Spady; Kenneth Grant; Kacy Brooks; Edwin Almonte; Cyndi Lauper; Robert Hyman	SPK	5:05
11.	"Head Bussa"	Santiago; Williams	The Neptunes	3:49
12.	"Wanna Be Like Him" (featuring Mashonda)	Santiago; Dean	Swizz Beatz	3:48
13.	"Black Clouds" (featuring Complexion)	Santiago; Grant; Brooks; Leshan Lewis; Ravenell	L.E.S.; Kyze (co.)	3:59
14.	"Banned From Another Club" (featuring Final Chapter)	Santiago; Allen Joseph; Brandon Burke; Almonte	SPK	4:05
15.	"Now I Pray" (featuring Musaliny)	Santiago; Abdallah; Almonte	SPK	3:37
16.	"Consider This" (featuring Kelis)	Santiago; Williams; Hugo	The Neptunes	4:09
17.	"Nahmeanuheard (Remix)" (performed by Capone-N-Noreaga, Cam'Ron, Fat Joe and Cassidy)	Santiago; Joseph Cartagena; Dean; Barclift	Swizz Beatz	4:03
18.	"Holla Back Slime" (featuring Busta Rhymes and Jadakiss)			1:26
19.	"The Life of a...(Gangsta)" (performed by Capone and Chinky)	Holley; Jeremy Graham	Yogi "Sugar Bear" Graham	5:28
Total length:				76:35

Leftover tracks

- "Livest Niggas"

Sample credits

- Track 10 contains a sample from "Time After Time" written by Cyndi Lauper and Robert Hyman as performed by Cyndi Lauper.

== Charts ==
=== Weekly charts ===
Chart (2002)	Peak position
Canadian Albums (Nielsen SoundScan)	29
Canadian R&B Albums (Nielsen SoundScan)	9
French Albums (SNEP)	98
UK R&B Albums (Official Charts)	27
US Billboard 200	3
US Top R&B/Hip-Hop Albums (Billboard)	3

=== Year-end charts ===
Chart (2002)	Position
Canadian R&B Albums (Nielsen SoundScan)	89
Canadian Rap Albums (Nielsen SoundScan)	47
US Billboard 200	177
US Top R&B/Hip-Hop Albums (Billboard)	52
