= Nothin' (N.O.R.E. song) =

2002 single by N.O.R.E.

Single by N.O.R.E.

from the album God's Favorite
- B-side: "Nahmeanuheard Remix"
- Released: June 3, 2002
- Length: 4:24 (album version); 3:57 (radio edit)
- Label: Def Jam; Violator; Thugged Out Entertainment
- Songwriters: Victor Santiago; Pharrell Williams; Chad Hugo; Greg Camp
- Producer: The Neptunes

N.O.R.E. singles chronology
"Live My Life" (2001)	"Nothin'" (2002)	"Full Mode" (2002)

Pharrell singles chronology
"Pass the Courvoisier, Part II" (2002)	"Nothin'" (2002)	"Boys" (2002)

"Nothin'" is the lead single from American rapper N.O.R.E.'s third studio album, God's Favorite (2002). The song was produced by the Neptunes and features Neptunes member Pharrell Williams performing the song's hook. "Nothin'" reached No. 10 on the US Billboard Hot 100 chart, surpassing N.O.R.E.'s 1998 hit "Superthug" (also produced by the Neptunes) as his biggest solo hit. At the end of 2002, "Nothin'" was ranked No. 37 on the Hot 100 year-end chart. The song also charted in the United Kingdom, where it peaked at number 11 on the UK Singles Chart.

== Composition ==
Produced by the Neptunes, "Nothin'" was recorded by N.O.R.E. for his third studio album God's Favorite (2002), with songwriting being credited to N.O.R.E. and Neptunes members Pharrell Williams and Chad Hugo. Williams performs the song's hook. The lyrics contain a nod to Smash Mouth's 1999 song "All Star"; the song's writer, Smash Mouth guitarist Greg Camp, was later credited as an additional songwriter on "Nothin'".

== Remix ==
The official remix was later released and features P. Diddy, Foxy Brown, Capone, Final Chapter, and Musaliny-n-Maze.

== Legacy ==
In 2022, Spin listed "Nothin'" as the 44th best song of 2002. The same year, it was sampled on rapper Armani White's song "Billie Eilish" from his EP Road to Casablanco. White and N.O.R.E. performed a medley of both songs at the 2022 edition of the BET Hip Hop Awards.

== Track listings ==
US 12-inch single

A1. "Nothin'" (album version)
A2. "Nahmeanuheard Remix" (album version featuring Capone, Cam'Ron, Fat Joe, and Cassidy)
B1. "Nothin'" (instrumental)
B2. "Nahmeanuheard Remix" (instrumental)

UK CD single

1. "Nothin'" (radio edit) – 3:57
2. "Nothin'" (remix featuring P. Diddy, Foxy Brown, Capone, Final Chapter, and Musaliny-n-Maze—explicit) – 4:26
3. "Nothin'" (album version—explicit) – 4:24
4. "Nothin'" (video) – 4:06

UK 12-inch single

A1. "Nothin'" (radio edit) – 3:57
A2. "Nothin'" (remix featuring P. Diddy, Foxy Brown, Capone, Final Chapter, and Musaliny-n-Maze—explicit) – 4:26
B1. "Nothin'" (album version—explicit) – 4:24
B2. "Nothin'" (instrumental) – 3:57

UK cassette single

1. "Nothin'" (album version—explicit) – 4:24
2. "Nothin'" (remix featuring P. Diddy, Foxy Brown, Capone, Final Chapter, and Musaliny-n-Maze—explicit) – 4:26

== Charts ==
=== Weekly charts ===
Chart (2002)	Peak position
Europe (Eurochart Hot 100)	50
Scottish Singles Sales (Official Charts)	35
UK Singles (Official Charts)	11
UK Hip Hop/R&B (Official Charts)	1
US Billboard Hot 100	10
US Hot R&B/Hip-Hop Singles & Tracks (Billboard)	2
US Hot Rap Tracks (Billboard)	3
US Rhythmic Top 40 (Billboard)	6

=== Year-end charts ===
Chart (2002)	Position
UK Urban (Music Week)	11
US Billboard Hot 100	37
US Hot R&B/Hip-Hop Singles & Tracks (Billboard)	10
US Hot Rap Tracks (Billboard)	7
US Rhythmic Top 40 (Billboard)	27

== Release history ==
Region	Date	Format(s)	Label(s)	Ref.
United States	June 3, 2002	Rhythmic contemporary; urban radio	Def Jam	
United States	September 3, 2002	Contemporary hit radio	Def Jam	
United Kingdom	September 9, 2002	12-inch vinyl; CD; cassette	Def Jam	
