= Oye Mi Canto =

2005 single by N.O.R.E., Daddy Yankee, Nina Sky

Single by N.O.R.E. featuring Nina Sky, Gem Star, Daddy Yankee and Big Mato

from the album 1 Fan a Day (intended) and N.O.R.E. y la Familia...Ya Tú Sabe
- B-side: "4 a Minute"
- Released: August 30, 2004
- Recorded: 2004
- Genre: Reggaeton
- Length: 4:01
- Label: Roc-La-Familia; Militianment Musica; Violator; Def Jam; Black Wall; Lico
- Producer: SPK

N.O.R.E. singles chronology
"Hustler Musik" (2004)	"Oye Mi Canto" (2004)

Nina Sky singles chronology
"Move Ya Body" (2004)	"Oye Mi Canto" (2004)	"Turnin' Me On" (2005)

Tego Calderón singles chronology
"Dominicana" (2004)	"Oye Mi Canto" (2004)	"Bandoleros" (2005)

"Oye Mi Canto" (English: "Hear My Song") is a reggaeton single by N.O.R.E. The song was originally released in 2004 as the lead single from the album 1 Fan a Day, which was heretofore unreleased. It is his second biggest hit, peaking at number 12 on the Billboard Hot 100. It was later included on the 2006 album N.O.R.E. y la Familia...Ya Tú Sabe. The song features Nina Sky and reggaeton artists Gem Star, Daddy Yankee and Big Mato. The song originally featured Tego Calderón in place of Daddy Yankee but was later changed for the video. However, the Tego version was released by famous reggaeton label Planet Records, instead of Island Def Jam, N.O.R.E.'s original label. It's N.O.R.E.'s first venture into the increasingly popular Latin genre reggaeton.

In a 2006 interview with MTV, N.O.R.E. says of the single, "I fell in love with this music. I did this joint originally for a mixtape. The Latino people haven't been spoken to in a while, since [Big] Pun died. They haven't felt like they had something proud [in hip-hop] to stand on, so being both Latin and black, I wanted to rep my Latin side for once. Why not do it with this new music, instead of doing a Spanish rap record? This is what speaks for the inner-city Latino youth."

The song was included on Billboard's 12 Best Dancehall & Reggaeton Choruses of the 21st century at number two.

== Track listings ==
Def Jam single (Daddy Yankee version)

1. "Oye Mi Canto" (radio)
2. "Oye Mi Canto" (explicit)
3. "Oye Mi Canto" (instrumental)
4. "4 a Minute" (radio)
5. "4 a Minute" (explicit)

Planet Records "Reggaeton Mix" single (Tego Calderón version)

1. "Oye Mi Canto" ("original" dirty mix)
2. "Oye Mi Canto" (clean mix)
3. "Oye Mi Canto" (instrumental)

Def Jam 1-track single (Daddy Yankee version)

1. "Oye Mi Canto" (radio edit)

== Translation ==
"Oye Mi Canto" literally translates to "Hear My Song" in English. Oye is the imperative conjugated form of tuteo of the infinitive verb oír (to hear). [For the second singular person tú (Oye) in imperative, nor vos (Oí / Oid), neither usted (Oiga), the personal pronoun in Spanish here is implicit].

== Charts ==
Chart (2004–06)	Peak position
Canada CHR/Pop Top 30 (Radio & Records)	17
France (SNEP)	13
Italy (FIMI)	29
US Billboard Hot 100	12
US Rhythmic Airplay (Billboard)	6
US Hot R&B/Hip-Hop Songs (Billboard)	24
US Hot Rap Songs (Billboard)	8
US Hot Latin Songs (Billboard)	22
US Latin Pop Airplay (Billboard)	25
US Tropical Airplay (Billboard)	2

== Certifications ==
Region	Certification	Certified units/sales
United States (RIAA)	Gold	500,000^{‡}
^{‡} Sales+streaming figures based on certification alone.

== Release history ==
Region	Date	Format(s)	Label(s)	Ref.
United States	August 30, 2004	Rhythmic contemporary · urban contemporary radio	Def Jam	
United States	October 11, 2004	Contemporary hit radio	Def Jam	
