= Naur =

Naur may refer to:

- Naur (animal), Nepalese name for the bharal, a type of bovid found in the Himalayas
- Peter Naur (1928–2016), Danish computer science pioneer
- Lars Anton Nicolai Larsen-Naur (1841–1896), Norwegian politician

== See also ==
- Nauru
- Nahur
- Nore (disambiguation)
- Noar (disambiguation)
- Nore (disambiguation)
