= N.O.R.E. (song) =

Single by Noreaga

from the album N.O.R.E.
- Released: April 28, 1998
- Recorded: 1997
- Genre: East Coast hip-hop
- Length: 3:07
- Label: Penalty; Tommy Boy
- Songwriters: Victor Santiago, Jr.; Jean-Claude Olivier; Samuel Barnes
- Producer: Trackmasters

Noreaga singles chronology
"N.O.R.E." (1998)	"Banned from T.V." (1998)

"N.O.R.E." is a song by American hip hop recording artist Noreaga, released on April 28, 1998, as the lead single from his solo debut studio album of the same name (1998). The song, which serves as Noreaga's solo commercial debut single, was produced by Poke & Tone of the Trackmasters.

== Music video ==
The music video, directed by Diane Martel, depicts Noreaga trying to escape from imprisonment. Fellow New York-based rappers Busta Rhymes, Spliff Star, Cormega, Fat Joe and Musaliny, all make cameo appearances in the music video.

== In other media ==
In 2005, the song was featured in the soundtrack to the video game Grand Theft Auto: Liberty City Stories.

== Charts ==
Chart (1998)	Peak position
US Hot R&B/Hip-Hop Songs (Billboard)	59
US Hot Rap Songs (Billboard)	32
