= Nore, Sweden =

Nore
- Location within Sweden Gävleborg Location within Sweden
- Coordinates: 61°50′N 16°03′E
- Country: Sweden
- Province: Hälsingland
- County: Gävleborg County
- Municipality: Ljusdal Municipality

Area
  - Total: 0.50 km^{2} (0.19 sq mi)

Population (31 December 2010)
  - Total: 411
  - Density: 815/km^{2} (2,110/sq mi)
- Time zone: UTC+1 (CET)
  - Summer (DST): UTC+2 (CEST)

Nore is a locality situated in Ljusdal Municipality, Gävleborg County, Sweden with 411 inhabitants in 2010.
