= Naor =

Naor (Hebrew: נאור; Hebrew pronunciation: [na'or]) is a Hebrew given name and family name meaning "enlightened". Naor may refer to:

== People ==
=== Given name ===
- Naor Abudi (born 1993), Israeli football player
- Naor Dahan (born 1990), Israeli football player
- Naor Gilon (born 1964), Israeli diplomat
- Naor Peser (born 1985), Israeli football player
- Naor Zion (born 1973), Israeli actor and comedian

=== Surname ===
- Assaf Naor (born 1975), Czech-Israeli mathematician
- Esther Raziel-Naor (1911–2002), Israeli politician and activist
- Matan Naor (born 1980), Israeli basketball player
- Miriam Naor (1947–2022), Israeli judge
- Moni Naor (born 1961), Israeli computer scientist
- Shira Naor (born 1993), Israeli actress
- Yigal Naor (born 1958), Israeli actor

== Other uses ==
- Naor's Friends, Israeli television series
- Naor-Reingold Pseudorandom Function

== See also ==
- Nur (name)
