= Channel 10 (album) =

Studio album by Capone-N-Noreaga
- Released: March 17, 2009
- Recorded: 2007–2009
- Genre: East Coast hip hop; hardcore hip hop; gangsta rap
- Label: Thugged Out; Jackmove; SMC; Fontana
- Producer: Alchemist; The Alienz; Mike Beatz; Big Drain; Ron Browz; DJ Premier; Hangmen 3; Havoc; Hazardis Soundz; The Inkredibles; SPK; Streetrunner

Capone-N-Noreaga chronology
The Reunion (2000)	Channel 10 (2009)	The War Report 2: Report the War (2010)

Singles from Channel 10
- 1. "Follow the Dollar" Released: November 25, 2008; 2. "Rotate" Released: January 27, 2009; 3. "Talk to Me, Big Time" Released: March 3, 2009

Professional ratings
Review scores
Source	Rating
AllHipHop	7/10 stars
Okayplayer	3.5/5 stars
XXL	3/5 stars

Channel 10 is the third studio album by rap duo Capone-N-Noreaga, released on March 17, 2009. It was the duo's first album in nine years.

== Track listing ==
No.	Title	Producer(s)	Length
1.	"Intro"		0:54
2.	"United We Stand"	Hazardis Soundz	4:08
3.	"Rotate" (featuring Ron Browz & Busta Rhymes)	Ron Browz	4:14
4.	"Talk to Me, Big Time"	The Inkredibles	3:14
5.	"Bring it Here"	Mike Beats	3:49
6.	"Grand Royal"	DJ Premier	3:40
7.	"The Argument"	Hazardis Soundz	3:18
8.	"Mirror"	Hazardis Soundz	3:46
9.	"Wobble" (featuring Mobb Deep)	Havoc	4:27
10.	"Channel 10"	SPK	3:12
11.	"Beef"	Streetrunner	3:35
12.	"My Life"	Hangmen 3	3:26
13.	"Stick Up"	The Alienz	3:28
14.	"My Hood" (featuring Clipse, Tha Dogg Pound, Maino & Uncle Murda)	SPK	6:07
15.	"Follow the Dollar"	Alchemist	3:30
16.	"You See Me!!!!"	The Inkredibles	3:15
17.	"Addicted"	Big Drain	3:51

iTunes Bonus tracks
No.	Title	Producer	Length
18.	"Dead Broke"	Hazardis Soundz	4:54
19.	"S.O.R.E."	Hangmen 3	3:22
20.	"Happy Birthday"	Hazardis Soundz	3:55

Leftover track

- "Money" (featuring Shawty Lo)

Sample credits

- "Bring it Here" contains a sample of "Tom Sawyer" by Rush.
- "S.O.R.E." contains a sample of "A Milli" performed by Lil Wayne & "Hello Brooklyn 2.0" performed by Jay-Z & Lil Wayne.

== Singles ==
"Follow the Dollar" was the first single released from Channel 10. It is produced by The Alchemist. A music video was made and directed by Vid Arroyo, the music video was later shelved because the song failed to chart. The song was also featured on The Alchemist's EP The Alchemist's Cookbook.

"Rotate" was the lead single and the second released from Channel 10. It is produced by Ron Browz and features Ron Browz & Busta Rhymes.

The song was released on January 27, 2009. It reached number 15 on Billboard's Bubbling Under R&B/Hip-Hop Singles chart.

The music video was directed by Rik Cordero.

"Talk to Me, Big Time" or "Talk To Me (Big Tyme)" was the second single released from Channel 10. It was produced by The Inkredibles. The song failed to chart on any of the charts. The song has a music video that was released March 17 and was directed by Rik Cordero.

== Charts ==
Chart (2009)	Peak position
US Billboard 200	136
US Independent Albums (Billboard)	21
US Top R&B/Hip-Hop Albums (Billboard)	21
