= The Reunion (Capone-N-Noreaga album) =

Studio album by Capone-N-Noreaga
- Released: November 21, 2000
- Recorded: 1998–2000
- Studios: The Hit Factory; Chung King Studios; Sound on Sound Studios; Electric Lady Studios; Criteria Studios; D&D Studios
- Genres: East Coast hip-hop; gangsta rap; hardcore hip-hop
- Length: 1:06:04
- Labels: Thugged Out; Tommy Boy
- Producers: Alchemist; Amarreto; Chris Liggio; Dame Grease; DJ Premier; EZ Elpee; Fame Flames; Havoc; Jewellz; Kyze; L.E.S.; Lord Finesse; Mr. Fortune; Nokio "The N-Tity"; Rush; SPKilla; T-Lo

Capone-N-Noreaga chronology
The War Report (1997)	The Reunion (2000)	Channel 10 (2009)

Singles from The Reunion
- 1. "Phonetime" Released: July 18, 2000; 2. "Y'all Don't Wanna" Released: 2000

The Reunion is the second studio album by American hip-hop duo Capone-N-Noreaga. It was released on November 21, 2000, via Noreaga's Thugged Out Entertainment and Tommy Boy Records. Recording sessions took place at The Hit Factory, Chung King Studios, Sound on Sound Studios, Electric Lady Studios, Criteria Studios and D&D Studios in New York City. Production was handled by Alchemist, Havoc, L.E.S., Amarreto, Chris Liggio, Dame Grease, DJ Premier, EZ Elpee, Fame Flames, Jewellz, Kyze, Lord Finesse, Mr. Fortune, Nokio "The N-Tity", Rush, SPKilla and T-Lo. It features guest appearances from Final Chapter, Carl Thomas, Complexion, Foxy Brown, Goldfingaz, Mobb Deep, Musaliny-N-Maze, Nas, Qadr, Timbo, Troy Outlaw and Tyson Beckford.

In the United States, the album peaked at number 31 on the Billboard 200, number 8 on the Top R&B/Hip-Hop Albums and number 2 on the Independent Albums charts. Its lead single, "Phonetime", reached number 22 on the Hot Rap Songs chart. The second single of off the album, "Y'all Don't Wanna", made it to number 71 on the Hot R&B/Hip-Hop Songs and number 63 on the R&B/Hip-Hop Airplay charts.

== Critical reception ==
Professional ratings
Review scores
Source	Rating
AllMusic	2.5/5 stars
HipHopDX	3/5
laut.de	3/5 stars
Los Angeles Times	3/4 stars
RapReviews	7.5/10
The New Rolling Stone Album Guide	3/5 stars
Vibe	3/5 stars

Steve 'Flash' Juon of RapReviews was intrigued by The Reunion for striking "a delicate balance between the "thugs" and the "backpackers" in the much fractured hip-hop scene today on the East coast", singling out "Bang Bang" and "Invincible" as highlights, but was critical of the guest contributions on "Don't Know Nobody" and "Straight Like That", concluding that: "[W]ith Capone giving Noreaga the balance he has always needed and Noreaga helping Capone keep his name alive in the business, the return of this talented duo is long overdue and well received [...] It's not a perfect return, but we're glad their back." A writer for HipHopDX commended the duo for maintaining their "lyrical chemistry" and the beats from DJ Premier ("Invincible"), The Alchemist ("Bang Bang") and Mobb Deep ("Queens Finest") but felt the rest of the track listing lacked the thug intensity found in their debut effort, concluding that: "Overall, The Reunion is a mediocre album, not bad but not great either." Despite highlighting both "Bang Bang" and "Invincible" as standout tracks, AllMusic's Matt Conaway saw the record as a "step backward" for the duo, with guest contributions being "more detrimental than beneficial", saying it "sounds like a hurried project, one where the material has been compromised just to get product on the streets."

== Track listing ==
No.	Title	Writer(s)	Producer(s)	Length
1.	"Intro: Change Is Gonna Come" (featuring Carl Thomas)	Sam Cooke	Rush	2:20
2.	"Phonetime Skit"			0:33
3.	"Phonetime"	Kiam Holley; Victor Santiago; LeShan Lewis	L.E.S.	4:06
4.	"Queens" (featuring Complexion)	Holley; Santiago; Alan Maman; Wendy Waldman; Denzil Foster; Thomas McElroy; Nancy Walker	Alchemist	4:06
5.	"Invincible"	Holley; Santiago; Chris Martin; Jimmie Cameron	DJ Premier	3:44
6.	"Bang Bang" (featuring Foxy Brown)	Holley; Santiago; Inga Marchand; Maman; Geoff Leach	Alchemist	4:28
7.	"Gangsta Skit"	Holley; Kevin Ravenell	Kyze	1:06
8.	"Y'all Don't Wanna"	Holley; Santiago; Tamir Ruffin; Kenya Miller	Nokio "The N-Tity"; Fame Flames	4:28
9.	"Shows! (Interlude)" (featuring Timbo)			1:18
10.	"Straight Like That" (featuring Final Chapter)	Holley; Santiago; Brandon Burke; Allen Joseph; Angel Lewis	Jewellz	4:47
11.	"All We Got Is Us"	Holley; Santiago; Lamont Porter	EZ Elpee	4:26
12.	"Brothers" (featuring Goldfingaz and Troy Outlaw)	Holley; Santiago; Wilbert David; Troy Muldrow; Omar Glover; Tony Aviles; Mike Fortunato; Arthur Ferrante; Louis Teicher	Amarreto; T-Lo; Mr. Fortune	4:01
13.	"B EZ" (featuring Nas)	Holley; Santiago; Nasir Jones; L. Lewis	L.E.S.	3:56
14.	"Gunz in da Air"	Holley; Santiago; Kejuan Muchita	Havoc	4:08
15.	"Wet Willie Skit" (featuring Tyson Beckford and Qadr)			1:18
16.	"Full Steezy"	Holley; Edwin Almonte; Barry Gibb; Maurice Gibb; Robin Gibb	SPK	4:22
17.	"Queens Finest" (featuring Mobb Deep and Final Chapter)	Holley; Santiago; Albert Johnson; Muchita; Burke; Joseph	Havoc	4:26
18.	"You Can't Kill Me"	Holley; Santiago; Damon Blackmon	Dame Grease	4:07
19.	"Don't Know Nobody" (featuring Musaliny-N-Maze)	Holley; Santiago; Musa Abdallah; Michael Allen; Robert Hall; Chris Liggio	Lord Finesse; Chris "CL" Liggio	4:24
Total length:				1:06:04

Sample credits

- Track 4 contains excerpts from "Living Is Good" written and performed by Wendy Waldman and interpolations from "In Debt to You" written by Denzil Foster, Thomas McElroy and Nancy Walker.
- Track 5 contains excerpts from "Hey Boy Over There" written by Jimmie Cameron and performed by Jimmie and Vella.
- Track 6 contains a sample of "Unknown Soldier" written by Geoff Leach and performed by Atmosphere Music.
- Track 12 contains a replayed portion of "Music Lovers" written by Arthur Ferrante and Louis Teicher.
- Track 16 contains interpolations of "Islands in the Stream" written by Barry Gibb, Maurice Gibb and Robin Gibb.

== Charts ==
=== Weekly charts ===
Chart (2000)	Peak position
US Billboard 200	31
US Top R&B/Hip-Hop Albums (Billboard)	8
US Independent Albums (Billboard)	2

=== Year-end charts ===
Chart (2001)	Position
US Top R&B/Hip-Hop Albums (Billboard)	68
