= Superthug =

Single by Noreaga

from the album N.O.R.E.
- Released: September 21, 1998
- Genre: East Coast hip-hop; Latin hip-hop
- Length: 5:00
- Label: Tommy Boy
- Songwriters: Victor Santiago; Pharrell Williams; Charles Hugo; Debbie Harry; Chris Stein
- Producer: The Neptunes

Noreaga singles chronology
"You Came Up" (1998)	"Superthug" (1998)	"Blood Money Pt. 3" (1999)

"Superthug" is a song by American rapper Noreaga with background vocals from Tammy Lucas during the song's hook. It was released as the second single from his debut solo album, N.O.R.E.. At the time, it became Noreaga's highest charting and most successful single, peaking at No. 36 on the Billboard Hot 100 and reaching No. 1 on the Hot Rap Songs chart. However it was later surpassed by his 2002 single "Nothin'" which peaked at #10 on the Billboard Hot 100.

Along with Mase's "Lookin' at Me", the single was one of the first high-profile productions done by Virginia production team the Neptunes. It made the Neptunes well known and sought after producers in the music industry, and in the first decade of the 21st century they would become one of the most successful production teams in music history, being named the Billboard magazine Producer of the Decade for the 2000s.

"Superthug" would later be sampled on Janet Jackson's "Ruff (I Like It)", recorded for her album Damita Jo which failed to make the cut, although a snippet was leaked to the Internet in 2010. Jackson also considered including the song on her album Discipline.

== Background and recording ==
Noreaga first met The Neptunes at Sound on Sound Studios whilst recording material for his debut studio album N.O.R.E. (1998). After playing Noreaga two instrumentals, Pharrell Williams gave him a third – the instrumental which eventually became "Superthug" – and told him not to listen to it until he had travelled to Miami. Noreaga duly listened to it for the first time at The Kent Hotel in Miami, and later told Billboard that "mentally, my dick got hard" to hear an instrumental prepared specifically for him. Noreaga wrote his vocals and performed them to Williams, who then booked him a session at Right Track Recordings in New York City, where the song was recorded.

The repeated refrain of "what what" was originally recorded by Noreaga as a placeholder vocal, as he did not yet have a chorus prepared. However, Williams decided to keep the "what what" refrain in the final mix as he liked how it sounded; after Noreaga expressed fears that people would laugh at him for using that chorus, Pharrell quipped that they would be laughing "all the way to the bank".

== Charts ==
=== Weekly charts ===
Chart (1998–1999)	Peak position
Germany (GfK)	74
UK Hip Hop/R&B (OCC)	22
UK Singles (OCC)	103
US Billboard Hot 100	36
US Hot R&B/Hip-Hop Songs (Billboard)	15
US Hot Rap Songs (Billboard)	1

=== Year-end charts ===
End of year chart (1998)	Position
Billboard Hot R&B/Hip-Hop Singles & Tracks	88

== Compilation appearances ==
- All That "Hip Hop" (2005)
- Piece by Piece (Original Motion Picture Soundtrack) (2024)
