= Tru Life =

American rapper

- Born: Roberto Guzmán Rosado, Jr. March 19, 1976 (age 50); Lower East Side, Manhattan, New York City, New York, U.S.
- Genre: Hip hop
- Occupation: Rapper
- Years active: 1996–present
- Labels: MogulTree, Freebandz, Roc-La-Familia (former)

Roberto Guzmán Rosado Jr. (born March 19, 1976), better known by his stage name Tru Life, is an American rapper. He was signed to Jay-Z's Roc-A-Fella Records briefly but was incarcerated soon after. Before signing he had spent time with various other labels, featured on numerous songs and had already generated quite a buzz due to prominent beefs, appearances on mixtapes and Smack DVD.

He was released from prison in 2016. He has since actively protested his conviction.

Soon after his release Tru Life featured on a song with Rick Ross which was received well. The music video for the song, released on YouTube, gathered over 1 million views within one month.

As of January 2017 Tru Life has featured on a few mixtape tracks but has not released a single. In 2017, he announced that he has signed a deal with American rapper Future's Freebandz record label, under the aegis of Sony's Epic Records.

== Career ==
Tru Life's career started in 1999 after being signed to DreamWorks Records. His album, Cryin' Out Loud, was scheduled to be released in November 2001. In an interview, Tru Life says "They weren't ready to do black music", and "there were too many bumps in the road, and I couldn't move."

He eventually landed an audition with Jay-Z. After more than ten minutes, Tru Life was able to convince Jay-Z of his skills, which prompted Jay-Z to reply "Somebody, get this kid in front of a camera!". He was signed to a six-figure record deal later that evening. Tru Life gained a significant amount of notice when he made an original song "Wet Em Up" for Grand Theft Auto IV's fictional radio station "The Beat 102.7", which was used in the Playboy X trailer released weeks prior to the game.

In 2009 Tru Life stated that after a break of around 1 and 1/2 years he was getting back into music and mentioned that he was earlier signed to Def Jam but personally asked Jay-Z to get him off Def Jam, which he did, before signing him to Roc La-Familia, a subsidiary of his main label Roc-A-Fella.

Tru Life had a feud with Mobb Deep that was documented in the film Beef. He also has a 'beef' with Dipset, in which Tru Life depicted Dipset's Jim Jones wearing a Borat-style mankini; Jones' affiliates retaliating by hacking Tru Life's MySpace page and putting up a similar picture of Tru Life.

Since coming out of prison in 2016 Tru Life has stated he is done with any beefs or feuds he had in the past. He is of the opinion that he has been through so much in his life that the old rivalries he was once engaged in now seem meaningless.

== June 2009 assaults ==
On June 15, 2009, Jason Gray also known as Jay Black, 30, and Christopher Guerrero, 20, were attacked in a lobby on East 26th Street in Manhattan. Roberto Rosado Jr. and his brother Marcus were involved in the incident, though their level of involvement remains disputed. Guerrero was stabbed in the abdomen. Guerrero died of his wounds and Gray was critically injured. The assaults were said to have stemmed from a dispute at Club Pacha on W. 46th Street. The brothers were subsequently arrested and charged with murder in 2011. Rosado Jr. was additionally charged with weapons possession.

Tru Life pleaded guilty to "gang assault" and was sentenced to eight years in prison. His brother pleaded guilty to manslaughter and was sentenced to 10 years in prison. Tru Life began his prison sentence in 2011 and was released in April 2016, having served five years of his sentence.

== Discography ==
=== Albums ===
- 2001: Cryin' Out Loud
- 2018: Walking on Water

=== Mixtapes ===
- 2005: The New New York: The Movement
- 2007: Tru York

=== Singles ===
- "When You're a Thug" featuring Prodigy & Kool G Rap
- "I Can't Believe" featuring Swizz Beatz
- "Tears" featuring Bobby Valentino
- "Wet Em Up" (original song made for Grand Theft Auto IV, produced by DJ Green Lantern)
- "Watch Me Fall" featuring Snoop Dogg
- "I Don't Need Love" Featuring Keri Hilson
- "Bag For It" Featuring Rick Ross & Velous
- "Last Night" DJ Clue featuring Tru Life & Future
- "Spin Ya Block" featuring Teddy Da Don
- "Baddie" featuring Future
