= N.O.R.E. (album) =

Studio album by Noreaga
- Released: July 7, 1998
- Recorded: 1997–1998
- Studios: Criteria (Miami); The Hit Factory (New York City); Electric Lady (New York City); Bearsville (N.Y.); House of Hits (N.Y.); The Cutting Room (New York City); Right Track (New York City)
- Genre: Hip hop
- Length: 68:58
- Labels: Thugged Out; Penalty; Violator; Tommy Boy
- Producers: Curt Gowdy; Dame Grease; DJ Clue?; Ez Elpee; Jay "Waxx" Garfield; Ken "Duro" Ifill; L.E.S.; Marley Marl; Nasheim Myrick; SPK; Swizz Beatz; The Neptunes; Trackmasters

Noreaga chronology
N.O.R.E. (1998)	Melvin Flynt – Da Hustler (1999)

Singles from N.O.R.E.
- 1. "N.O.R.E." Released: April 28, 1998; 2. "Banned from T.V." Released: July 28, 1998; 3. "Superthug" Released: September 21, 1998

Professional ratings
Review scores
Source	Rating
AllMusic	4/5 stars
The Source	4/5 stars
Spin	5/10

N.O.R.E. (an acronym for Niggas on the Run Eating) is the debut studio album by American rapper Noreaga. It was released on July 7, 1998, by Penalty Recordings. Recording sessions took place at Criteria Studios in Miami, at The Hit Factory, Electric Lady Studios, The Cutting Room and Right Track Recording in New York, at Bearsville Studios, and at House of Hits. Production was handled by Trackmasters, L.E.S., Curt Gowdy, Dame Grease, DJ Clue?, EZ Elpee, Ken "DURO" Ifill, Marley Marl, Nashiem Myrick, SPK, Swizz Beatz, The Neptunes and J "Waxx" Garfield. It features guest appearances from Musaliny-N-Maze, Nature, Big Pun, Busta Rhymes, Cam'ron, Carl Thomas, Chico DeBarge, Jadakiss, Kid Capri, Kool G Rap, Nas, Spliff Star and Styles P.

The album debuted at number 3 on the Billboard 200 and topped the Top R&B/Hip-Hop Albums chart with sales of 163,000 in its first week of release. It was certified Gold by the Recording Industry Association of America on September 15, 1998, for selling 500,000 copies.

The album contained the hit single "Superthug" which peaked at #36 on the Billboard Hot 100 and reached #1 on the Hot Rap Singles chart.

The song "The Change" found new fame after then-underground rapper 50 Cent was filmed free-styling over its instrumental. The album's first single and title-track "N.O.R.E.", is featured on the soundtrack of the 2005 video game Grand Theft Auto: Liberty City Stories, as the game was set in 1998, the year the album was released.

== Track listing ==
No.	Title	Writer(s)	Producer(s)	Length
1.	"The Jump Off"	Charles Callet		0:54
2.	"Banned from T.V." (featuring Nature, Cam'ron, Styles P, Jadakiss and Big Punisher)	Victor Santiago; Jermaine Baxter; Cameron Giles; David Styles; Jason Phillips; Christopher Rios; Kaseem Dean	Swizz Beatz	5:11
3.	"I Love My Life" (featuring Carl Thomas)	Santiago; Lamont Porter; Frederick Gordon; Vincent Bell	EZ Elpee	4:36
4.	"N.O.R.E."	Santiago; Jean-Claude Olivier; Samuel Barnes	Poke & Tone	3:14
5.	"Hed Interlude" (removed from the clean version)			1:00
6.	"Hed" (featuring Nature)	Santiago; Baxter; Olivier; Barnes	Poke & Tone	4:48
7.	"It's Not a Game" (featuring Musaliny-N-Maze)	Santiago; Michael Allen; Musa Abdallah; Edwin Almonte; Manuel Álvarez-Beigbeder Pérez; Purificación Casas Romero	SPK	3:12
8.	"Fiesta" (featuring Kid Capri)	Santiago; Olivier; Barnes	Poke & Tone	3:35
9.	"40 Island" (featuring Kool G Rap and Musaliny)	Santiago; Nathaniel Wilson; Abdallah; Marlon Williams	Marley Marl	4:35
10.	"The Way We Live" (featuring Chico DeBarge)	Santiago; Leshan Lewis; Chris Jasper; Ernie Isley; Marvin Isley	L.E.S.	5:09
11.	"Animal Thug Interlude" (removed from the clean version)			1:41
12.	"The Change"	Santiago; Richard Pimentel	Curt Gowdy	3:32
13.	"Superthug" (featuring Tammy Lucas)	Santiago; Chad Hugo; Pharrell Williams; Chris Stein; Deborah Harry	The Neptunes	5:00
14.	"Da Story" (featuring Maze)	Santiago; Allen; Lewis	L.E.S.	4:43
15.	"Mathematics (Esta Loca)"	Santiago; Ernesto Shaw; Ken Ifill; David Arkin; Earl Robinson; Pascal Gabriel; Severo Lombardoni	DJ Clue?; DURO	3:23
16.	"The Assignment" (featuring Busta Rhymes, Spliff Star and Maze)	Santiago; Trevor Smith; William Lewis; Allen; Nashiem Myrick; Jay Garfield; Jerry Butler; Marvin Yancy	Nashiem Myrick; J. "Waxx" Garfield	4:22
17.	"Body in the Trunk" (featuring Nas)	Santiago; Nasir Jones; Damon Blackmon	Dame Grease	3:49
18.	"One Love" (removed from the clean version)			5:13
19.	"Outro"	Callet		1:01
Total length:				1:08:58

== Charts ==
=== Weekly charts ===
Chart (1998)	Peak position
Canadian Albums (Billboard)	19
US Billboard 200	3
US Top R&B/Hip-Hop Albums (Billboard)	1

=== Year-end charts ===
Chart (1998)	Position
US Billboard 200	131
US Top R&B/Hip-Hop Albums (Billboard)	22

== Certifications ==
Region	Certification	Certified units/sales
United States (RIAA)	Gold	500,000^{^}
^{^} Shipments figures based on certification alone.

== See also ==
- List of number-one R&B albums of 1998 (U.S.)
