= The War Report =

Studio album by Capone-N-Noreaga
- Released: June 17, 1997
- Recorded: 1995–1997
- Genres: East Coast hip-hop; hardcore hip-hop
- Length: 70:43
- Labels: Penalty; Tommy Boy
- Producers: Charlemagne; EZ Elpee; Nashiem Myrick; Carlos "6 July" Broady; Naughty Shorts; DJ Clark Kent; Tragedy Khadafi; G-Money; Buckwild; Lord Finesse; Marley Marl

Capone-N-Noreaga chronology
The War Report (1997)	The Reunion (2000)

Singles from The War Report
- 1. "L.A., L.A." Released: April 1996; 2. "Illegal Life" Released: August 13, 1996; 3. "T.O.N.Y. (Top of New York)" Released: February 11, 1997; 4. "Closer" Released: 1997

Professional ratings
Review scores
Source	Rating
AllMusic	4.5/5 stars
The Source	4/5 stars

The War Report is the debut studio album by American hip-hop duo Capone-N-Noreaga (C-N-N). Released in 1997, the album features the singles "L.A., L.A.", "T.O.N.Y.", "Illegal Life" and "Closer". Tragedy Khadafi appears on more than half of the album's songs and served roles as both producer and executive producer. The success of the album managed the group to make a sequel titled The War Report 2: Report the War. The album was originally scheduled to be released on June 15, 2010, almost exactly 13 years after the original, but it was pushed back a month later to July 13, 2010. In 2022, Rolling Stone placed it at number 187 on their list of the 200 Greatest Hip-Hop Albums of All Time.

== Track listing ==
#	Title	Producer(s)	Featured Artist(s)	Length
1	"Intro"	Charlemagne		1:32
2	"Bloody Money"	EZ Elpee		4:33
3	"Driver's Seat"	Nashiem Myrick; Carlos "6 July" Broady for The Hitmen	Imam T.H.U.G.; Busta Rhymes	3:40
4	"Stick You"	Naughty Shorts	Tragedy Khadafi	4:43
5	"Parole Violators"	Tragedy Khadafi	Havoc; Tragedy Khadafi	2:30
6	"Iraq (See the World)"	EZ Elpee	Castro; Musaliny (From Musaliny-N-Maze); Mendosa; Troy Outlaw	5:33
7	"Live On, Live Long"	Naughty Shorts		4:50
8	"Neva Die Alone"	Buckwild	Tragedy Khadafi	3:23
9	"T.O.N.Y. (Top of New York)"	Nashiem Myrick; Carlos "6 July" Broady for The Hitmen	Tragedy Khadafi	4:28
10	"Channel 10"	Lord Finesse	Tragedy Khadafi	3:21
11	"Capone Phone Home" (Interlude)			1:43
12	"Thug Paradise" (Many pressings of the album mistakenly list "Stay Tuned (Interlude)" as track 12; "Thug Paradise" appears in its place on numerous retail versions of The War Report, also on the soundtrack of the 1997 film Nothing to Lose. "Stay Tuned" does appear on a few early pressings of the album, along with the original version of "Closer" in place of the Sam Sneed remix.)	D-Moet (uncredited)	Tragedy Khadafi	3:30
13	"Capone Bone"	Marley Marl		3:37
14	"Halfway Thugs"	Charlemagne		3:13
15	"L.A., L.A. (Kuwait Mix)"	Marley Marl; J. Force (uncredited)	Mobb Deep; Tragedy Khadafi	4:49
16	"Capone-N-Noreaga Live" (Interlude)			2:43
17	"Illegal Life"	Tragedy Khadafi; Havoc (drum programming)	Tragedy Khadafi; Havoc	3:49
18	"Black Gangstas"	Buckwild	Tragedy Khadafi	2:59
19	"Closer" (Original pressings of the album had this version, while subsequent pressings included the Sam Sneed remix of "Closer" in place of the original.)	DJ Clark Kent	Nneka	4:04
20	"Capone Phone Home" (Outro)			1:33

^Busta Rhymes' part is cut off before he starts. He only appears on the last 20 seconds of the song, ad-libbing over the hook. The songs "Stick You," "Parole Violators," "Halfway Thugs," and "L.A., L.A (Kuwait Mix)" are partially edited, even though the album was released with an explicit-lyrics sticker.

Sample-clearance issues caused two tracks, "Married to Marijuana" and "Calm Down (Feat. Nas & Tragedy Khadafi)," to be cut from the retail version of the album. Both songs were originally on the promo version sent out for reviews but were omitted from the retail album when it hit stores. Both became popular mixtape and underground radio tracks and were released as white label 12-inch singles.

== Samples ==
- "Bloody Money"
  - "Impeach the President" by the Honey Drippers
  - "Philadelphia Morning" by Bill Conti
- "Capone Bone"
  - "Step into Our Life" by Roy Ayers
  - "Cruisin'" by D'Angelo
- "L.A., L.A. (Kuwait Mix)"
  - "The Letter" by Al Green
  - "New York, New York" by Grandmaster Flash & the Furious Five
- "Iraq (See the World)"
  - "Night Song" by Noel Pointer
- "T.O.N.Y (Top of New York)"
  - "Speak Her Name" by Walter Jackson
- "Live On, Live Long"
  - "Who's Gonna Take the Blame" by Smokey Robinson & The Miracles
- "Closer"
  - "Closer Than Friends" by Surface
  - "Promise Me" by Luther Vandross
- "Channel 10"
  - "M5 (SK 7)" by Roy Budd
- "Stick You"
  - "Orange Was the Color of Her Dress, Then Silk Blues" by Charles Mingus
- "Halfway Thugs"
  - "A Change Is Gonna Come" by Aretha Franklin
  - "Only Because of You" by Roger Hodgson
- "Black Gangstas"
  - "Olhos De Gato" by Gary Burton
- "Driver's Seat"
  - "Do the Thing That's Best You" by Willie Hutch
- "Stay Tuned"
  - "Theme from S.W.A.T." by Rhythm Heritage

== Album singles ==
- "Illegal Life"
  - Released: 1996
  - B-side: "L.A,. L.A."; "Stick You"
- "T.O.N.Y. (Top of New York)"
  - Released: 1996
  - B-side:
- "Closer"
  - Released: 1997
  - B-side: Closer (Sam Sneed Version) Produced By Sam Sneed
- "Capone Bone"
  - Released: 1997
  - B-side: "Calm Down" (featuring Tragedy Khadafi & Nas)

== Charts ==
=== Weekly charts ===
Chart (1997)	Peak position
US Billboard 200	21
US Top R&B/Hip-Hop Albums (Billboard)	4

=== Year-end charts ===
Chart (1997)	Position
US Top R&B/Hip-Hop Albums (Billboard)	81

=== Singles ===
Year	Song	Chart positions		
Year	Song	US R&B	US Rap	US Dance Singles Sales
1996	"Illegal Life"	84	18	18
1996	"L.A., L.A."	-	39	-
1997	"T.O.N.Y. (Top of New York)"	56	16	-
1997	"Closer"	63	9	-
