= N.O.R.E. =

American rapper and podcaster (born 1977)

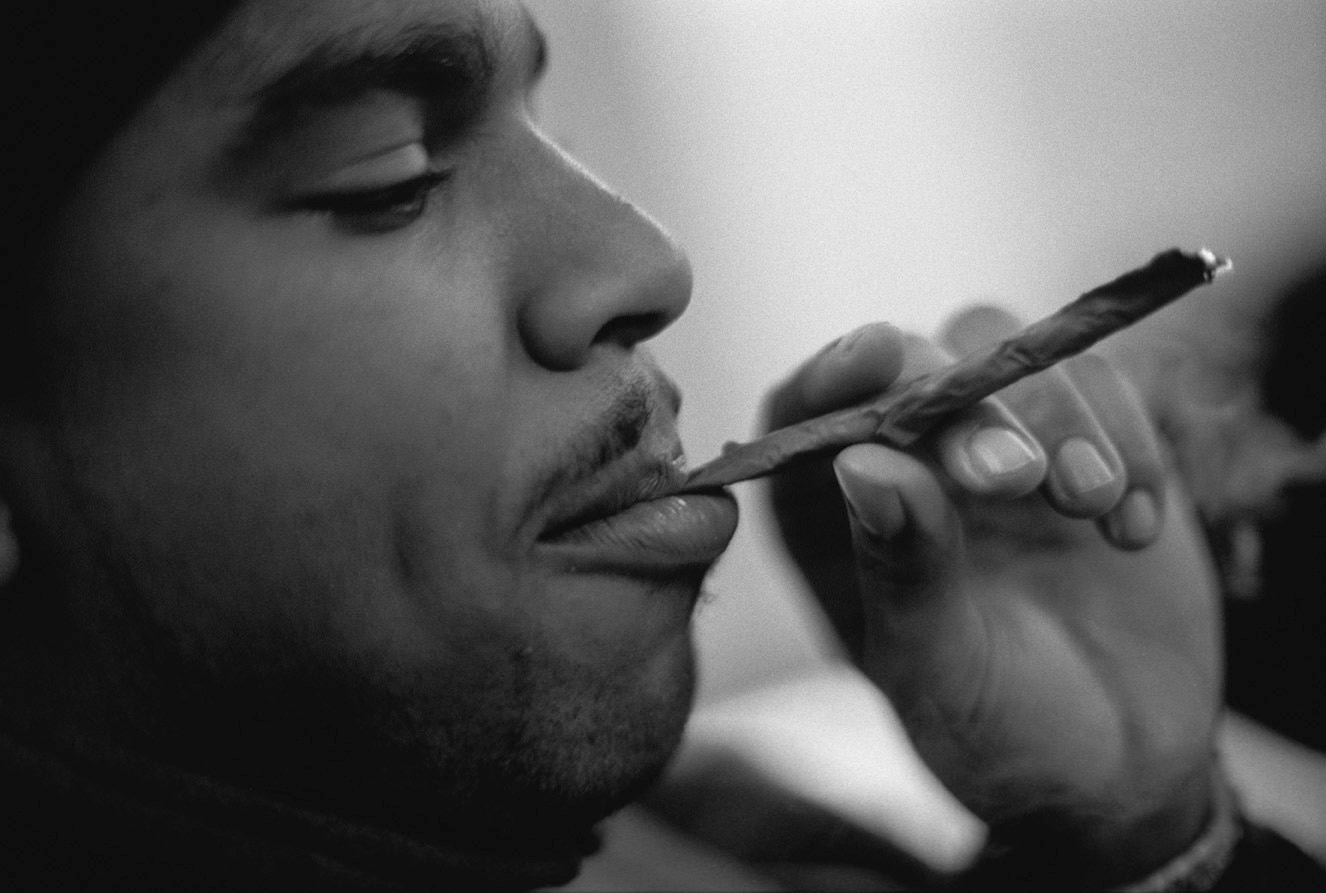
- N.O.R.E. in 1999

Background information
- Also known as: Noreaga; P.A.P.I.; Melvin Flynt
- Born: Victor James Santiago Jr. September 6, 1977 (age 49); New York City, U.S.
- Genres: East Coast hip-hop; hardcore hip-hop; reggaeton
- Occupations: Rapper; songwriter; podcaster
- Years active: 1995–present
- Labels: Mass Appeal; Penalty; E1; Conglomerate; Thugged Out; Violator; Def Jam; Roc-La-Familia; Tommy Boy; Babygrande
- Member of: Capone-N-Noreaga
- Formerly of: Flipmode Squad
- Website: drinkchamps.com

Victor James Santiago Jr. (born September 6, 1977), better known by his stage names N.O.R.E. (an acronym for Nigga on the Run Eating) and Noreaga, (Note: /nɔːriː.eɪɡə/ NOR-ee-AY-gə) is an American rapper and podcaster. Santiago first rose to prominence as one half of the East Coast hip-hop duo Capone-N-Noreaga, which he formed in 1995 with fellow Queens-based rapper Capone. The duo released five studio albums, briefly disbanding after their second to pursue solo careers.

Santiago signed with Penalty Recordings as a solo artist to release his self-titled debut studio album in 1998. (Note: At the time of its release, he was known as Noreaga, although he changed his stage name to the album's title, N.O.R.E. in late 1999.) The album peaked at number three on the Billboard 200 and spawned the Billboard Hot 100-top 40 single "Superthug". He followed up with his second album, Melvin Flynt – Da Hustler (1999) before signing with Def Jam Recordings to release his third album, God's Favorite (2002). Matching his debut in chart position, it spawned his highest charting-single "Nothin'" (featuring Pharrell), which peaked at number ten on the Billboard Hot 100. He signed with Jay-Z's Roc-La-Familia to release his fourth album N.O.R.E. y la Familia...Ya Tú Sabe (2006), which saw his departure from hip hop in favor of reggaeton. It spawned the single "Oye Mi Canto" (featuring Nina Sky and Daddy Yankee), which peaked at number 12 on the chart.

His independently-released fifth and sixth albums, Noreality (2007) and Student of the Game (2013) marked his return to East Coast hip hop. The latter narrowly entered the Billboard 200 and was issued through fellow New York rapper Busta Rhymes' Conglomerate label, although Santiago has since launched his own label imprint, Militainment Business. He signed with Nas' Mass Appeal Records to release his seventh album, 5E (2018).

Outside of music, Santiago is the co-host (with DJ EFN) of the talk show and podcast Drink Champs, which centers around celebrity interviews. The show has been described as "The Premier Hip Hop Interview Show" and won "Best Hip Hop Platform" at the 2022 BET Hip Hop Awards.

== Early life ==
Santiago was born in Queens, New York City, to a Puerto Rican father and Black-American mother. He was raised in apartment 5E in the LeFrak City apartment complex located in the Corona neighborhood of Queens.

== Musical career ==
=== 1995–1997: Career beginnings with Capone ===
Santiago began his career in 1995, performing under the pseudonym Noreaga (after Panamanian ruler Manuel Noriega), as part of the duo Capone-N-Noreaga alongside friend and fellow Queens-based rapper Capone, whom he met while serving time in prison. Santiago would spend time hanging out in Capone’s neighbouring Queensbridge Houses. They signed to Penalty Recordings in 1996, and released their debut album The War Report, in 1997. The War Report was a commercial and critical success that made the duo well known among hip hop audiences. The album received praise for using the "traditional grimey boom-bap" sound of classic New York City hip hop, which at that time was falling out in favor of a more futuristic sound. The album peaked at No. 21 on the Billboard 200, and the singles "Illegal Life", "Closer", and "T.O.N.Y. (Top of New York)" all charted on the Hot R&B/Hip-Hop Singles and Tracks chart.

=== 1997–2000: Solo career and debut album ===
Following the release of the album, Capone was again sentenced to a jail term, which left Noreaga to take on a solo career and make an album on his own. Noreaga solo debut studio album N.O.R.E, was released in 1998. The title, a shortening of the artist's name, used the backronym "Niggaz on (the) Run Eatin'". The album became even more successful than the duo's debut, charting at No. 3 on the Billboard 200 and being certified platinum by the Recording Industry Association of America (RIAA). The album features guest appearances from fellow NYC rappers Nas, Kool G Rap, Big Pun and Busta Rhymes. It also features a different production style than The War Report, including the modern futuristic sound, with tracks produced by then-up-and-coming producers The Neptunes and Swizz Beatz. The Neptunes produced the hit "Superthug", which reached No. 36 on the Billboard Hot 100 and No. 1 on the Hot Rap Tracks chart. The song, along with Mase's hit "Lookin' At Me", was one of the Neptunes' first major productions.

In 1999, Noreaga released his second solo album, Melvin Flynt - Da Hustler, which was a moderate success, reaching the top 10 of the Billboard 200 and becoming certified gold by the RIAA. The album's most successful single (produced by The Neptunes) was "Oh No", which reached No. 49 on the Hot R&B/Hip-Hop Singles and Tracks chart. Capone was released from prison in 1999. The two subsequently began recording music together again and released their second C-N-N album in 2000. The album, titled The Reunion, was not well-received critically and failed to match the commercial success of the duo's debut or Noreaga's solo albums. AllMusic reviewer Matt Conaway summed up the album by stating "With The Reunion, Capone-N-Noreaga take a step backward." The group would then go on a hiatus and not release another album until 2009.

=== 2001–2007: Name change and reggaeton era ===
Noreaga continued his career as a solo artist. He officially changed his stage name to N.O.R.E. in the late 1990s, and after some delays, his third solo studio album God's Favorite, was released in 2002. The album peaked at No. 3 on the Billboard 200. It contained the major hit "Nothin'" (produced by The Neptunes), which reached No. 10 on the Billboard Hot 100. It became N.O.R.E.'s highest-charting hit.

Following God's Favorite, N.O.R.E. changed his musical focus. He began recording Spanish-language songs to reflect his Puerto Rican background and made reggaeton music, rather than traditional hip hop. The reggaeton single "Oye Mi Canto", was released in 2004 and became a major hit, peaking at No. 12 on the Billboard Hot 100. The song was originally supposed to be a single from an upcoming album titled 1 Fan a Day, but the album was never released. Instead, N.O.R.E. released a reggaeton/hip hop album in 2006, titled N.O.R.E. y la Familia...Ya Tú Sabe, which included the lead singles "Oye Mi Canto" and "Mas Maiz". The album, released under Jay-Z's Roc-La-Familia, has both English and Spanish language tracks. It did not chart nearly as well as any of N.O.R.E.'s previous solo albums, as it only reached No. 82 on the Billboard 200.

N.O.R.E. went on to release two more solo albums. The first, his fifth album Noreality, was released in 2007 and supported by the single "Set It Off", featuring vocals and production from Swizz Beatz. N.O.R.E. released his CD/DVD, Noreality, in September via a joint venture with his own Thugged Out Militainment label and Babygrande Records. The album features guest appearances from Jadakiss, Three 6 Mafia, Kanye West, Pharrell, Mobb Deep's Prodigy, Bun B, Tru Life, David Banner, Kurupt and Capone. Swizz Beatz is among the producers. The DVD, which was made available in limited quantities, is based on the rapper's life.

The second album S.O.R.E., was controversially released in 2009. N.O.R.E. would go on to denounce S.O.R.E., calling it an album he had nothing to do with, as he asked fans not to purchase it. The album is a reference to his stage name and his first album which is a backronym for "Niggaz on (the) Run Eatin'", which makes "S.O.R.E.", "Still on (the) Run Eatin'". The term was first used in late 2007, when N.O.R.E. released a song titled "Still on the Run Eatin'", featuring Lil Wayne. N.O.R.E. said in a video blog that he didn't approve of this album. He stated the album's artwork was of him at 310 pounds, adding that he had lost 62 pounds since then. He also mentioned that five songs on the album were actually handed in, while the rest were pulled off the internet, some of which were recorded in 2007, probably stemming from his label's financial issues. He later stated he was working on an album known as N.O.R.E. Pt. 2: Born Again, ultimately retitled Student of the Game.

=== 2009–present: Student of the Game and podcasting career ===
In 2009, N.O.R.E. collaborated with Capone once again, to release their third studio album Channel 10, which charted at No. 136 on the Billboard 200. A fourth Capone-N-Noreaga album, titled The War Report 2, was released in 2010. Its lead single was "Hood Pride", featuring Faith Evans. In June 2011, fellow American rapper Busta Rhymes, with whom N.O.R.E. has collaborated several times in the past, stated on his Twitter account that he had officially signed N.O.R.E. to his newly founded record label Conglomerate Records. N.O.R.E. has since launched his own label imprint, Militainment Business.

Between 2009 and 2011, N.O.R.E. teamed up with DJ EFN to host a satellite radio show for Sirius XM called Militainment Crazy Raw Radio, a title that gave equal weight to N.O.R.E.'s Militainment brand, EFN's Crazy Hood, and 66 Raw, the channel on Sirius XM which carried the show.

In early 2013, N.O.R.E. stated that he would yet again change his moniker, this time to P.A.P.I. (Acronym for Power Always Proves Intelligence), which stirred mixed reactions from his fans. On April 16, he released Student of the Game and announced a sequel would be released as his next album.

On September 27, 2013, N.O.R.E. told MTV that his next album, Melvin Flynt II: Da Final Hustle, would be his final album. He stated he planned to stop touring and releasing solo albums to focus on being a music executive and CEO. On October 30, 2015, he tweeted: "New and last album in July!!!", followed by "Melvin Flynt 2? Or N.O.R.E. 2?". By July 2016, it appeared the rapper had abandoned his plan for retirement as he continued making music.

N.O.R.E. reunited with DJ EFN to begin hosting the "Drink Champs" podcast in March 2016. Celebrity hip-hop guests are featured in most episodes, sharing stories and updates while drinking alcohol. The podcast has achieved more than five million listens per month. Since November 2016, the show has been aired on Revolt. In 2017, N.O.R.E. signed with Nas' Mass Appeal Records. He released his seventh album, 5E, in July 2018.

== Legal issues ==
On February 24, 2009, N.O.R.E. was arrested at a Fatburger restaurant in Miami Beach, FL, after a fight with a customer.

== Discography ==
Studio albums

- N.O.R.E. (1998)
- Melvin Flynt – Da Hustler (1999)
- God's Favorite (2002)
- N.O.R.E. y la Familia...Ya Tú Sabe (2006)
- Noreality (2007)
- Student of the Game (2013)
- 5E (2018)

== Video game appearances ==
The rapper appears as himself and is a playable character in the 2003 video game Def Jam Vendetta and its 2004 sequel Def Jam: Fight for NY.

== See also ==
- List of Afro-Latinos
