= Capone-N-Noreaga =

American hip-hop duo

Background information
- Also known as: C-N-N
- Origin: Queens, New York City, U.S.
- Genres: East Coast hip-hop; gangsta rap; hardcore hip-hop
- Occupation: Rappers
- Works: Capone-N-Noreaga discography
- Years active: 1995–2004; 2006–2011; 2013–present
- Labels: Penalty; Tommy Boy; Def Jam; Thugged Out
- Members: Capone; N.O.R.E.

Capone-N-Noreaga (also known as C-N-N) is an American hip hop duo formed in 1995 from Queens, New York. The duo features East Coast rappers Capone and N.O.R.E.

== History ==
In October 1995, Capone-N-Noreaga appeared in The Source magazine's "Unsigned Hype" column. In 1996, the duo secured a recording contract with Neil Levine's Penalty Recordings. In 1996, before the group's debut album was completed, Capone was jailed for a parole violation, and Noreaga finished their debut album The War Report, with the help of various fellow New York City hip-hop acts, including Mobb Deep and Tragedy Khadafi. The album was met with critical and commercial acclaim; it also saw the group partake in the conflict between Death Row Records and Bad Boy Entertainment, making it a more widespread East Coast/West Coast rivalry, responding to West Coast hip hop duo Tha Dogg Pound's single "New York, New York", with their own rendition of "L.A L.A".

In 2000, the group released The Reunion, their second album on Tommy Boy Records. The album was similarly star-studded but suffered from mixed reviews. Additionally, Capone had once again been sent to prison before its release for violating a probation sentence on gun possession, which undermined promotion of the album. Soon after, in 2001, Capone-n-Noreaga jumped ship to prominent label Def Jam. As Tommy Boy retained the rights to the names Capone-n-Noreaga and Noreaga, because the company claimed that the duo owed it more recordings, the group shortened its name to CNN, and Noreaga billed himself as N.O.R.E. (or NORE) for his solo work. The duo recorded a new album in 2003, titled New Religion, with a lead single "Yes Sir," which was issued on mixtapes and promoted with a music video. The single failed to make an impact, and the album was ultimately shelved. A compilation of several tracks was released in 2004, entitled "What Up 2 Da Hood Thugged Out",

Later that year, the duo found itself implicated in a non-fatal shooting between rival hip-hop groups, one of which included fellow East Coast rapper Lil' Kim, after a chance encounter outside New York radio station Hot 97. Capone-n-Noreaga have denied any involvement in the shooting, for which the group was not charged. In early 2005, Def Jam released Capone from his contract while retaining N.O.R.E.; Capone released his solo debut album Pain, Time, and Glory, later the same year.

In 2006, N.O.R.E. brought up the possibility of a Capone-N-Noreaga reunion and a new album. On June 12, 2008, the duo released a mixtape titled Back on That Q.U. Shit. CNN released Channel 10, their third studio album, on March 17, 2009, referencing the name of a song from their debut album, The War Report. Channel 10 was put together with the assistance of longtime friend DJ EFN. The album's lead single, titled "Rotate", features Busta Rhymes and Ron Browz, and was produced by the latter. American record producers DJ Premier, Havoc, and The Alchemist—among others—also provided production for the album.

In 2010, the duo had teamed up once again to release their fourth album in June. The album, titled The War Report 2: Report the War as a sequel to their debut, was released to slight fanfare. At that point, the duo recalibrated and decided to return to focusing on solo efforts. In June 2011, N.O.R.E. announced via his Twitter account, that the group had disbanded and that he would continue to focus on his solo career. In March 2013, N.O.R.E. and Capone called into radio personality Sway Calloway's morning radio show, to announce they had once again reunited.

In August 2016, the duo also had a collaboration with Supreme, a clothing company. This collaboration with Supreme is based on the duo's "The War Report" and includes a waffle thermal longsleeved crewneck shirt and shorts, t-shirt, hooded sweatshirt and a skateboard deck which features Capone-N-Noreaga's original album artwork from The War Report. In 2020, the instrumental to "Streets Favorite" from Capone's 2005 album became an Internet meme on TikTok, typically being played when an accident is shown.

== Discography ==
Studio albums

- The War Report (1997)
- The Reunion (2000)
- Channel 10 (2009)
- The War Report 2: Report the War (2010)
- Lessons (2015)

== Video game appearances ==
- Def Jam Vendetta (2003)
- Def Jam: Fight for NY (2004)
- Def Jam Fight for NY: The Takeover (2006)
