= Nina Sky discography =

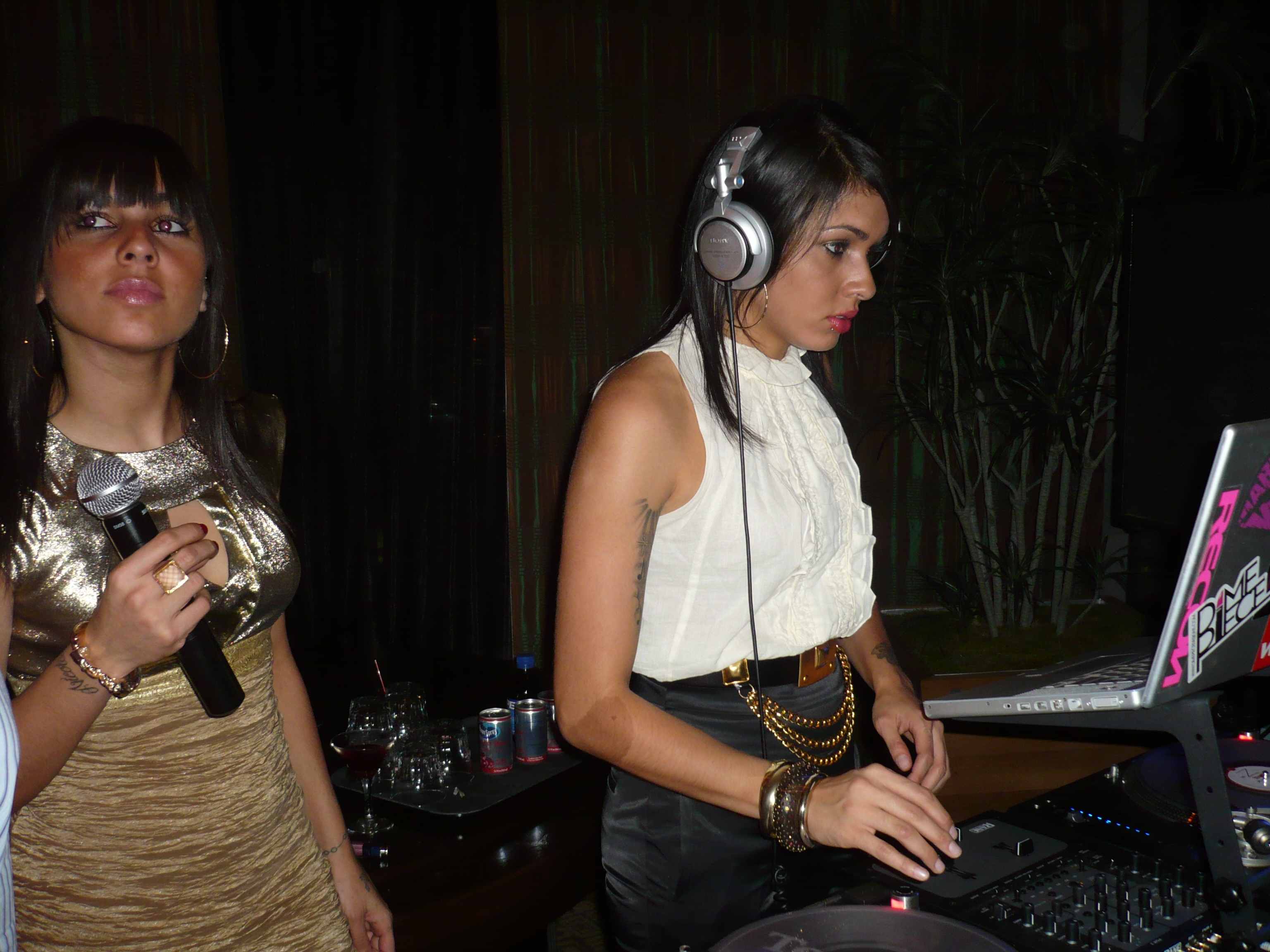
- Nina Sky in 2007
- Studio albums: 2
- Extended plays: 2
- Singles: 14
- Music videos: 8
- Featured singles: 10
- Unreleased albums: 1
- Mixtapes: 4

This is the full discography of American music duo Nina Sky. Together, they have released two studio albums, one extended play, 14 singles, and have appeared as a guest on 10 singles.

== Albums ==
=== Studio albums ===
Year	Title	Chart positions		
Year	Title	US	US R&B	UK
2004	Nina Sky: Released: June 22, 2004 (US); Label: Universal, Next Plateau	44	21	135
2012	Nicole and Natalie: Released: July 31, 2012 (WW); Label: Independent	—	—	—

=== EPs ===
Year	Title
2010	The Other Side: Released: August 3, 2010; Label: Independent

=== Mixtapes ===
- 2004: The Nina Sky
- 2005: La Conexión
- 2006: 80's Babies
- 2006: Back to the Future

=== Unreleased albums ===
- 2007/2008/2009: Starting Today

== Singles ==
=== As lead artist ===
Year	Title	Chart positions				Certifications	Album
Year	Title	US	US R&B	US Rhy.	UK	Certifications	Album
2004	"Move Ya Body" (featuring Jabba)	4	14	6	6	RIAA: Gold; BPI: Gold	Nina Sky
2004	"Turnin' Me On"	105	74	33	—		Nina Sky
2005	"Ladies Night" (featuring Ivy Queen)	—	—	—	—		La Conexión
2005	"Lovin You" (featuring Notch)	—	—	—	—		La Conexión
2005	"Your Time"	—	—	—	—		La Conexión
2008	"Curtain Call" (featuring Rick Ross)	—	79	—	—		Starting Today
2008	"On Some Bullshit"	—	—	—	—		Starting Today
2010	"You Ain't Got It (Funk That)"	—	—	—	—		The Other Side
2012	"Day Dreaming"	—	—	—	—		Nicole and Natalie
2012	"Heartbeat"	—	—	—	—		Nicole and Natalie
2012	"Comatose"	—	—	—	—		Nicole and Natalie
2015	"Forever"	—	—	—	—		(none)
2016	"Champion Lover"	—	—	—	—		(none)

=== As featured artist ===
Year	Title	Chart positions				Certifications	Album
Year	Title	US	US R&B	CAN	US Latin	Certifications	Album
2004	"Oye Mi Canto" (N.O.R.E. featuring Nina Sky, Daddy Yankee, Gem Star & Big Mato)	12	24	—	22	RIAA: Gold	N.O.R.E. y la Familia...Ya Tú Sabe
2004	"Hold You Down" (The Alchemist featuring Nina Sky & Prodigy)	95	47	—	—		1st Infantry
2005	"Play That Song" (Tony Touch featuring Nina Sky and B-Real)	113	122	—	31		The Reggaetony Album
2005	"Bailando" (Yaga & Mackie featuring Nina Sky)	—	—	—	18		La Moda
2006	"Más Maíz" (N.O.R.E. featuring Nina Sky, Big Mato, La Negra of LDA, Fat Joe, Lumidee, Chingo Bling & Lil Rob)	—	75	—	—		N.O.R.E. y la Familia...Ya Tú Sabe
2007	"Things You Do" (DJ Envy & Red Cafe featuring Nina Sky)	115	106	—	—		The Co-Op
2007	"Don't Be Shy" (Belly featuring Nina Sky)	—	—	45	—		The Revolution
2009	"Move" (N.O.R.E. featuring Nina Sky & Jim Jones)	—	—	—	—		S.O.R.E.
2009	"Celle qu'il te faut" (Kenza Farah featuring Nina Sky)	—	—	—	—		Avec le cœur
2009	"Keep It Goin' Louder" (Major Lazer featuring Nina Sky & Ricky Blaze)	—	—	—	—		Guns Don't Kill People... Lazers Do
2009	"Boom" (Play-N-Skillz featuring Pitbull & Nina Sky)	—	—	—	—		Recession Proof
2011	"Cocoa Butter" (Statik Selektah & Action Bronson featuring Nina Sky)	—	—	—	—		Well-Done
2015	"Afterhours" (Troyboi featuring Diplo & Nina Sky)	—	—	—	—		non-album single
2016	"Riot" (Azealia Banks featuring Nina Sky)	—	—	—	—		Slay-Z

== Music videos ==
Year	Title	Director(s)
2004	"Move Ya Body"	Max Nichols / Scott Winig
2004	"Oye Mi Canto"	Gil Green
2004	"Hold You Down"	Estevan Oriol
2005	"(Hey DJ) Play That Song"	
2006	"Más Maíz"	Benjamin DeJesus
2007	"Things You Do"	Edwin Decena
2009	"On Some Bullshit"	Relentless
2009	"Keep It Goin' Louder"	Eric Wareheim
2010	"You Ain't Got It (Funk That)"	Treezy
2012	"Day Dreaming"	Adam Sauermilch
2012	"Heartbeat"	Adam Sauermilch
2014	"Stoners" (featuring Smoke DZA)	Blizzedout, Feebzz
2015	"Afterhours" (TroyBoi featuring Nina Sky & Diplo)	Aaron Dean
2016	"Champion Lover"	Ariel Fisher & Austin Kearns
