= You Ain't Got It (Funk That) =

Single by Nina Sky

from the album The Other Side
- Released: July 8, 2010
- Recorded: 2010
- Genre: R&B, dance-pop, electropop
- Length: 2:59
- Label: Independent
- Songwriters: Nicole Albino, Natalie Albino
- Producer: DJ Yonny

Nina Sky singles chronology
"On Some Bullshit" (2009)	"You Ain't Got It (Funk That)" (2010)	"Day Dreaming" (2012)

"You Ain't Got It (Funk That)" (also titled as "You Ain't Got It" and stylized as "YOU AIN'T GOT IT!") is a song by American pop duo Nina Sky. It was released as the main single from their second EP The Other Side on July 8, 2010. The song samples Sagat's 1994 minor-hit "Funk Dat". On their EP, there is a remix, featuring MeLo-X. The song was one of the first songs recorded for album.

== Background ==
After finishing recording the unreleased album Starting Today, Nina Sky had a lot of fights with their label Polo Grounds over the release of the album. These were their tweets for Bryan Leach: "Starting a new campaign today... 'Nina Sky Doesn't Play Polo. For months we've had complete album, ready for release. Y'all wanna know what's relly goin' on? Nothing [and] that's the problem. We released [two] videos and singles without support from our label. All good... Stayed positive. After months of no movement, we asked to be released [and] still nothing. No acknowledgmengt from the President of our label, Bryan Leach. Bottom line, we want to be released. If you're really down with our movement, holler [at] Bryan Leach". After that Nina Sky started to record an eight songs for a new album, set to release independently in summer. The album was recorded in winter and spring of 2010. It was finally released on August 3, 2010, independently through their official website. They released one more single from EP with the same title on July 21, 2010, as promotional song.

== Music video ==
Music video was filmed at the end of the summer in 2010. It was released in October 2010 on their website. Video premiere was on October 19 on Rap-Up.

=== Synopsis ===
Music video was directed by Treezy. In music video Nicole and Natalie are shown hanging out in the city. Right after, Natalie is shown in dark blue room singing her part of song. In the same time Nicole is shown in a white dress in black room. After that they are again shown in the street where Nicole is singing Chorus. Natalie is again shown in blue room, but the wall behind her started to change colours: red, brown, orange, green and blue and they are shown dancing with some people in the street. Twins were again shown in the street and then in the club dancing. Natalie is singing in the club, and then (with a new look) in some purple room. Nicole is again singing the chorus in the club. They start to walk in the street and they saw some fan. The fan asks Natalie to give him her signature. Then Nicole pulls Natalie and they walked away. The fan opens the paper but there are only words YOU AIN'T GOT IT. The music video finished and the girls walked away.

== Track listing ==
Digital download

1. "You Ain't Got It (Funk That)" – 2:59
