= Yonnie =

Yonnie or Yonny may refer to:

- Thomas Licavoli (1904-1973), American gangster and bootlegger during Prohibition, nicknamed "Yonnie"
- Joseph Yonnie Starr (1905-1990), Canadian Hall-of-Fame Thoroughbred racehorse trainer
- Yonny Hernández (born 1988), Colombian motorcycle racer
- DJ Yonny (born 1983), American disc jockey born Jonathan Ávila

Fictional Characters

- Yonny, the doctor of the Rescue Corps. He is in charge of night expeditions to gather Glow sap in an effort to cure leaflings from Pikmin 4
