= Chiney =

Chiney may refer to:

- Ciney (formerly Chiney), a city and municipality in Namur, Wallonia, Belgium
- Chiney Ogwumike (born 1992), American basketball player and analyst

== See also ==
- Black Chiney, Jamaican musical group
