= La Conexión =

- Standard edition cover. Special edition features a close-up of twins' faces.

Mixtape by Nina Sky
- Released: October 21, 2005
- Recorded: 2004–2005
- Studios: Lovehouse Music Studios (Union City, New Jersey)
- Genres: Latin; hip hop; R&B
- Length: 46:25 (standard); 50:15 (special)
- Languages: English; Spanish
- Labels: La Conexión; Traffic
- Producers: Nicole Albino; Natalie Albino; George Mena; Mysto & Pizzi; DJ Sonic; DJ Blass

Nina Sky chronology
Nina Sky (2004)	La Conexión (2005)	The Other Side (2010)

Singles from La Conexión
- 1. "Play That Song" Released: September 25, 2005; 2. "Ladies' Night" Released: April 17, 2006

La Conexión (English: Connection) is a mixtape recorded by Puerto Rican-American girl group Nina Sky. It was released on October 21, 2005, in United States and four days later worldwide through La Conexión Music and Traffic Records, one year after their debut self-titled studio album. It features appearances by musicians such as N.O.R.E., Tony Touch, B-Real, Ivy Queen, Pitbull, Lil Jon, Richie Rivera, Yaga & Mackie, Aventura and Notch. Special edition of the album was also released in October 2005. It contained one bonus track and an exclusive bonus DVD. The duo said that they gave the album title La Conexión because they feel connection to Latin music and culture, Puerto Rican food, Spanish language etc. while embracing their Puerto Rican roots. La Conexión failed to chart anywhere, but its lead single "Play That Song" (Tony Touch featuring Nina Sky and B-Real) was success. La Conexión was produced by twins themselves, Mysto & Pizzi, DJ Sonic and DJ Blass.

== Background and recording ==
After they released their debut album Nina Sky, they started recording another project. Mixtape's recording was started in late 2004, and finished in mid-2005. On some of the songs, they were featuring artist, such as "Churn That Butta", "Play That Song", "You're Lying" etc. It was released as mixtape with special edition bonus DVD. Album's recording sessions just finished before the first single was released. Some songs from the album were unreleased songs from their debut studio album. The duo named the album La Conexión because they feel connection with Spanish language, Puerto Rican food and Latin music. They were also featured on Sean Paul's song "Connection" which was included on his third studio album The Trinity. There are a lot of Spanish songs on the album such as "Sueños", "La Conexión", "Toma", "Vamos Amarnos" and "Tu y Yo".

La Conexión was mixed and mastered by George Mena for Lovehouse Music Studios in Union City, New Jersey.

== Release and promotion ==
Mixtape was released on October 21, 2005, in United States, October 25, 2005, worldwide and December 19, 2006, as reissue in United States only. It wasn't released through Universal like their first album but through La Conexión Music Company and Traffic Records. It was promoted by two singles:

- "Play That Song" was released as the lead single on September 25, 2005, through EMI Latin (now Capitol Latin). It was performed by Tony Touch featuring Nina Sky and B-Real. It peaked at number thirteen on US Bubbling Under Hot 100 chart, number seven on US Latin Tropical Airplay chart and number five on Latin Rhythm Airplay chart. This made Nina Sky two of only a few female artists who have been able to reach the Top 10 of the Latin Rhythm Airplay chart along with Ivy Queen, who currently has seven top-ten, two of them number-one singles, Latin pop singers Shakira and RBD, and American R&B singers Beyoncé, Cassie, and Keyshia Cole.
- "Ladies Night" was released as the second and final single on April 17, 2006, along with tracks "Loving You" and "Your Time" It featured guest appearance by Ivy Queen. It failed to chart.

== Artwork and title ==
Artwork was made in 2005. The first (standard edition) cover features twins in front of the yellow-green background with white letters of the name (NINA SKY) and album (LA CONEXIÓN). Second was special edition artwork. It's a close-up of their faces and on most of the releases, it features round label, marking CD/DVD album. Both versions feature green letters OUR HERITAGE · OUR PEOPLE · OUR MUSIC on the bottom. Album was titled La Conexión because twins feel connection to Latin music, culture, Spanish language and Puerto-Rican lifestyle, since they were born in Puerto Rico. In English, the title means Connection, which is the name of the song recorded by Sean Paul featuring Nina Sky for his 2005 album The Trinity.

== Track listing ==
La Conexión – Standard edition
No.	Title	Writer(s)	Producers	Length
1.	"Ladies' Night" (featuring Ivy Queen)	Nicole Albino, Natalie Albino, Martha Rodriguez	Mysto & Pizzi	3:49
2.	"Play That Song" (featuring Tony Touch and B-Real)	Albino, Albino, Vladimir Felix, Louis Freeze, Stephen Hague, Joseph Hernandez, Malcolm McLaren, Ronald Larkins, Robert Andrews, Tyrone Price	DJ Blass, DJ Sonic	3:18
3.	"Sueños"			4:05
4.	"Toma" (featuring Pitbull and Lil Jon)	Armando Perez, Jonathan Smith	Lil Jon	4:59
5.	"Vamos Amarnos" (featuring Richie Rivera)	Rivera		4:03
6.	"You're Lying" (featuring Aventura)	Albino, Albino, Anthony Santos, Max Santos		4:27
7.	"Loving You" (featuring Notch)	Albino, Albino	Notch	3:25
8.	"Tú y Yo"	Valadez, Alberto Aguilera		2:48
9.	"La Conexión" (featuring Yaga & Mackie)		Mackie	3:49
10.	"Churn That Butta" (featuring N.O.R.E.)		N.O.R.E.	3:47
11.	"Things Will Change"	Albino, Albino		4:12
12.	"Turnin' Me On" (Kassanova Remix)	Albino, Albino, Cipha Sounds, David Shayman, Supa Dups	Kassanova	3:43
Total length:				46:25

La Conexión – Special edition (bonus track)
No.	Title	Length
13.	"La Conexión" (Street Mix)	3:50
Total length:		50:15

La Conexión – Special edition (bonus DVD)
No.	Title	Length
1.	"Chapter 1: Performances"
2.	"Chapter 2: In Studio"
3.	"Chapter 3: 1st Photoshoot"
4.	"Chapter 4: Deejaying"

== Personnel ==
- Nicole Albino – primary artist, featured artist (tracks 2, 4, 5, 6, 10), songwriter, producer
- Natalie Albino – primary artist, featured artist (tracks 2, 4, 5, 6, 10), songwriter, producer
- Mixed and mastered by George Mena for Lovehouse Music Studios
- Ivy Queen – featured artist (track 1)
- Mysto & Pizzi – producer (track 1)
- Tony Touch – primary artist (track 2)
- B-Real – featured artist (track 2)
- DJ Sonic – producer (track 2)
- DJ Blass – producer (track 2)
- Vladimir Felix – songwriter (track 2)
- Louis Freeze – songwriter (track 2)
- Stephen Hague – songwriter (track 2)
- Joseph Hernandez – songwriter (track 2)
- Malcolm McLaren – songwriter (track 2)
- Ronald Larkins – songwriter (track 2)
- Robert Andrews – songwriter (track 2)
- Tyrone Price – songwriter (track 2)
- Pitbull – primary artist, songwriter (track 4)
- Jonathan Smith – songwriter (track 4)
- Richie Rivera – primary artist (track 5)
- Anthony Santos – songwriter (track 6)
- Max Santos – songwriter (track 6)
- Aventura – primary artist (track 6)
- Notch – featured artist (track 7)
- Mackie y Yaga – featured artist, producer (track 9)
- N.O.R.E. – primary artist (track 10)
- Supa Dups – songwriter, producer (track 12)
- Cipha Sounds – songwriter, producer (track 12)
- Disco D – songwriter, producer (track 12)
- Kassanova – remixer (track 12)

== Release history ==
Region	Date	Edition	Format	Label	Ref.
United States	October 21, 2005	Standard; Special	CD; digital download; CD/DVD; LP	La Conexión; Traffic	
Worldwide	October 25, 2005	Standard; Special	CD; digital download; CD/DVD; LP	La Conexión; Traffic	
United States	December 19, 2006	Reissue	CD	La Conexión; Traffic	
