= Turnin' Me On (Nina Sky song) =

Single by Nina Sky

from the album Nina Sky
- Released: November 30, 2004
- Recorded: 2003–04: The Hit Factory; Sterling Sound Studios; Mirror Image Studios (New York City, New York); The Booty Barn Studios (Brooklyn, New York City); Al Burna Studios; Black Chiney Studios; The Boxx Studios (Miami, Florida)
- Genre: Reggae fusion; R&B
- Length: 3:32
- Label: Black Chiney; Universal; Next Plateau
- Songwriters: Nicole Albino; Natalie Albino; Luis Diaz; David Shayman; Dwayne Chin-Quee
- Producers: Cipha Sounds; Disco D; Supa Dups; M. "Khan" Chin

Nina Sky singles chronology
"Oye Mi Canto" (2004)	"Turnin' Me On" (2004)	"Play That Song" (2005)

"Turnin' Me On" is the second single from duo Nina Sky's debut album. It was written by Nicole Albino, Natalie Albino, David Shayman (Disco D), Cipha Sounds and Dwayne Chin-Quee (Supa Dups). The song uses Black Chiney's Kopa riddim. The single was released on 30 November 2004 for digital download and CD. It was released as the second and final single from their self-titled debut album. It was a minor hit in France and the United States, failing to chart on the US Billboard Hot 100. "Turnin' Me On" served as the final release by Nina Sky through Universal Records, before the label got defunct in 2005 and the duo moved to Polo Grounds Music.

== Background and recording ==
It was written by Nicole and Natalie Albino, David Shayman, Luis Diaz and Dwayne Chin-Quee and produced by Disco D, Cipha Sounds, Supa Dups and M. "Khan" Chin. It was recorded between 2003 and 2004 in various studios located in New York City and Miami. Majority of the track was worked with Black Chiney and recorded in their studios in Miami. "Turnin' Me On" speaks about a girl who gets attracted to a boy.

=== Recording locations ===
==== New York City ====
- The Hit Factory
- Sterling Sound Studios
- Mirror Image Studios
- The Booty Barn Studios

==== Miami ====
- Al Burna Studios
- Black Chiney Studios
- The Boxx Studios

== Commercial performance ==
"Turnin' Me On" was a moderate success and didn't repeat the success of "Move Ya Body", failing to enter the US Billboard Hot 100. It peaked at number five on the US Bubbling Under Hot 100. It was also a minor top 40 hit in France, where it peaked at number forty. It also peaked at number seventy-four on the Hot R&B/Hip-Hop Songs and number thirty-three on the US Billboard Rhythmic Top 40. It failed to chart anywhere but France and the United States and charted between 2004 and 2007.

== Track listing ==
Promo CD single

1. "Turnin' Me On" (Album version)
2. "Turnin' Me On" (Cipha Sounds mix)
3. "Turnin' Me On" (Black Chiney reggae remix)
4. "Turnin' Me On" (Instrumental version)
5. "Call Out Hook"

CD single

1. "Turnin' Me On" (Full Phatt Remix)
2. "Turnin' Me On" (Album version)

Vinyl 12"
A-side

1. "Turnin' Me On" (Cipha Sounds radio edit)
2. "Turnin' Me On" (Radio edit)

B-side

1. "Turnin' Me On" (Black Chiney reggae radio edit)
2. "Turnin' Me On" (Instrumental)

Vinyl 7"

1. "Turnin' Me On" (45' mix)
2. "Turnin' Me On" (Dancehall mix) (featuring Baby Cham)

2007 Jamaica edition

1. "Turnin' Me On" (Radio mix)
2. "Turnin' Me On" (Dancehall mix)

== Remixes ==
Three remixes were released for the song.

- One remix features Cham, in which its featured on the Kopa riddim compilation album.
- Another remix features Shawnna and Pitbull, in which it is featured on Pitbull's remix album Money Is Still a Major Issue.
- Third remix was Kassanova remix. It was released on October 21, 2005 on their mixtape album La Conexión.
- Fourth remix was exclusively for the second episode of Kerwin Frost's radio show exclusively on Apple Music paying homage to the entertainer on the song. It was premiered on May 25, 2020.

== Charts ==
Charts (2004–07)	Peak position
France (SNEP)	40
Hungary (Dance Top 40)	11
US Bubbling Under Hot 100	5
US Hot R&B/Hip-Hop Songs	74
US Rhythmic Top 40	33

== Awards and nominations ==
Year	Award	Category	Result
2004	Vibe Award	Vibe Next Award	Nominated
2006	Soul Train Music Award	Best R&B/Soul Single, Group, Band or Duo	Nominated

== Release history ==
Region	Date	Format	Label	Ref.
Europe	November 30, 2004	CD; digital download; 12"	Universal	
United States	November 30, 2004	CD; digital download; 12"	Universal; Next Plateau	
Jamaica	2007	7"	Black Chiney	
