= Fuck That =

Fuck That may refer to:

- "Fuck That", a song by Skrillex from the album Recess
- "Fuck That", a song by Death Grips from the album The Money Store
- "Fuk Dat", a 1993 song by Sagat, later retitled "Funk Dat"
