= Curtain Call (Nina Sky song) =

Single by Nina Sky featuring Rick Ross

from the album Starting Today
- Released: August 12, 2008
- Recorded: 2007
- Genre: Hip hop; R&B
- Length: 4:17
- Label: J; Polo Grounds; Sony Music
- Songwriters: Robert Smith; Robert Waller; William Roberts, Jr.
- Producers: Robert "EST" Waller; Bryan Leach; Cipha Sounds; Jamal Landlord; Nicole Albino; Natalie Albino; Mr. Morgan; Big Bert

Nina Sky singles chronology
"Play That Song" (2005)	"Curtain Call" (2008)	"On Some Bullshit" (2009)

"Curtain Call" is a song by the American hip-hop soul duo Nina Sky. It was released as second single from their unreleased second studio album Starting Today on August 12, 2008. It features a guest appearance rapper Rick Ross. In 2007, Nina Sky announced new album The Musical featuring Rick Ross. The album was never released because of many issues with their record label Polo Grounds/J. The second single from upcoming album was later announced to be "Curtain Call". Although single was moderately successful, no music video was released. Instead, duo filmed a music video for their following single "On Some Bullshit".

== Commercial performance ==
The single didn't perform well anywhere. It failed to chart anywhere but United States and also failed to chart on Billboard Hot 100. It peaked at number thirty-five on US Rhythmic Top 40 and number seventy-nine on US Hot R&B/Hip-Hop Songs. "Curtain Call" was the final single from Nina Sky to chart on any chart, since later singles weren't promoted and failed to chart. They also left Polo Grounds/J and switched on releasing music independent, so all of their later singles failed to chart.

== Track listing ==
=== CD single ===
1. "Curtain Call" (Main Version) (featuring Rick Ross) - 4:09
2. "Curtain Call" (No Rap) - 3:49
3. "Curtain Call" (Instrumental) - 4:34
4. "Curtain Call" (Call Out Hook) - 0:10

=== Vinyl 12" single ===
A-side

1. "Curtain Call" (Main) - 4:09
2. "Curtain Call" (Instrumental) - 4:34

B-side

1. "Curtain Call" (No Rap) - 3:49
2. "Curtain Call" (Instrumental) - 4:34

== Charts ==
Chart (2008–09)	Peak position
US Billboard Hot R&B/Hip-Hop Songs	79
US Billboard Rhythmic Top 40	35
