= Nina Sky (album) =

Studio album by Nina Sky
- Released: June 22, 2004
- Recorded: 2003–2004
- Studios: The Hit Factory (New York City, New York); Bennet Studios, Englewood, NJ
- Genres: Hip hop; reggaetón; R&B
- Length: 47:02
- Labels: Next Plateau; Universal
- Producers: Elijah Wells, Eddie O'Loughlin (exec.); Nicole Albino; Natalie Albino; Lionel Bermingham; M. "Khan" Chin; The Jettsonz; Cipha Sounds; Supa Dups; Will Divide; Disco D; Jamal Landlord; George Charles; Cordel Burrell; Curtis Bedeau

Nina Sky chronology
| Nina Sky (2004) | La Conexión (2005) |

Singles from Nina Sky
- 1. "Move Ya Body" Released: April 12, 2004; 2. "Turnin' Me On" Released: November 30, 2004

Nina Sky is the debut studio album by Puerto Rican girl group Nina Sky. The album was released on June 22, 2004, in the United States and a week later worldwide. It debuted at number 44 on the US Billboard 200 and sold 341,000 copies according to Nielsen Soundscan. The lead single "Move Ya Body" received a Gold Certification from Recording Industry Association of America (RIAA). The second single was "Turnin' Me On", but did not match the success of "Move Ya Body".

The single "Move Ya Body" was released on April 12, 2004, and reached number 4 on the Billboard Hot 100 chart. Urban music and rhythmic top 40 stations quickly added the song to their playlists, sending the song up the charts. By July 17, "Move Ya Body" had gone to the top five on both sides of the Atlantic and had also reached the top five of a world combined R&B chart based on the United States, United Kingdom, Germany, France and Australia. The song had also reached the top fifty of the Australian charts. "Turnin' Me On" was released in November 2004, but without the success of "Move Ya Body". It was a minor hit in France and United States, peaking at number five on US Billboard's Bubbling Under Hot 100 chart. The twins continued to work and promote their music. They have contributed to the reggaeton movement with songs such as "Oye Mi Canto", and "Más Maíz" with artist and producer N.O.R.E. They were also featured artists on Sean Paul's song "Connection" from his album The Trinity.

== Background and recording ==
In March 2004, Nicole and Natalie held their first live performance as Nina Sky. Concert was held in Club Demara on 18 March, which they revealed eleven years later. Later that year, record producer Elijah from The Jettsonz introduced the girls to Cipha Sounds, a hip hop DJ under the Star Trak label owned by The Neptunes (Pharrell and Chad Hugo). The twins then proceeded to write "Move Ya Body" (along with The Jettsonz, who also produced the record), mixing Caribbean rhythms. Eventually, a demo of the song was made. The demo fell into the hands of Eddie O'Loughlin, the president of Next Plateau Entertainment (which is a division of Universal Records). O'Loughlin signed the twins to a contract and they started working on their debut album. Twins recorded the album between 2003 and early 2004, mostly in The Hit Factory studio located in New York City. Many producers and musicians worked with them on the record, including The Jettsonz, Cipha Sounds, Supa Dups, Disco D, Betty Wright, Elijah Wells, etc. Songs "Move Ya Body" and "In a Dream" were both released two months before the full album was released, and were included on Move Ya Body EP.

== Release and promotion ==
Nina Sky was released on June 22, 2004, in the United States and on June 29, 2004, in other countries. It was promoted with two singles: "Move Ya Body" and "Turnin' Me On".

- The album's first single was Move Ya Body. It was released on April 12, 2004. Music video was released in April. The song charted at number 4 on the Billboard Hot 100 and number 22 on the 2004 Billboard Year-End Chart. It also reached number 6 on the UK Singles Chart. It was certified Gold by the RIAA in early 2005. Its B-side is a song "In a Dream". Nina Sky were often regarded as one-hit wonders, since "Move Ya Body" was the duo's only single to reach top 40 on Billboard Hot 100. The song ranked at number 250 on Blender's 500 Greatest Songs Since You Were Born.
- The album's second and final single was "Turnin' Me On". It was released on November 30, 2004, for digital download. The single did not make the same success like previous single "Move Ya Body", but it reached number 5 on Bubbling Under Hot 100. There were three remixes released for the song: One remix features Cham, the second remix features Pitbull and Shawnna and the third remix is Kassanova Remix, which was used for their second mixtape album La Conexion.

Album was also promoted with a mixtape, featuring remixes and collaborations. Mixtape was released later in 2004. It features a remix by Vybz Kartel for "Move Ya Body".

== Critical reception ==
Professional ratings
Review scores
| Source | Rating |
|---|---|
| AllMusic | 3.5/5 stars |
| Entertainment Weekly | B |
| People | 2/4 stars |
| Rolling Stone | 3/5 stars |
| Slant Magazine | 3/5 stars |
| Stylus Magazine | C |
| USA Today | 2.5/4 stars |

Nina Sky received mixed reviews from music critics. Entertainment Weekly gave the album a B, while Stylus Magazine gave it a C. Rolling Stone and Slant Magazine both gave the album three out of five stars. AllMusic gave it 3.5 stars, while People gave it two out of five stars.

USA Today critic Elysa Gardner felt that Nina Sky "aspires to the same progressively nostalgic vibe once offered by Lauryn Hill, whom both girls cite as an influence. But the breezily romantic, benignly sexy feel of tunes such as the hit single "Move Ya Body" and the more wistful "Faded Memories" invite comparisons with more commercially savvy pop-soul retrophiles."

== Commercial performance ==
Nina Sky was a moderate success in United States. However, it wasn't successful outside the United States, peaking at number 135 on the UK Albums Chart and not peaking on any other chart except in the US. It peaked at number 44 on the US Billboard 200 and number four on Top R&B/Hip-Hop Albums.

The album's first single, "Move Ya Body", was a huge success worldwide, peaking at number four on the Billboard Hot 100, but the album did not perform as well, only peaking in the United States and United Kingdom. The second single, "Turnin' Me On", was not as successful; it failed to enter the Billboard Hot 100 and peaked at number five on Bubbling Under Hot 100. It was also a minor hit in France.

A mixtape was released in 2004, designed to promote the album. It included the song "Oye Mi Canto" and also remixes of "Move Ya Body", "Turnin' Me On" and "Holla Back". A collaboration with Angie Martinez titled "Time to Go" was also included on the mixtape. The mixtape failed to chart anywhere and is out of print.

== Title ==
The album was self-titled. The sisters wanted to devise a name of their own. In using the first two syllables of their names ("Ni" and "Na"), they came up with Nina. They then added Sky, which for them represented "the sky's the limit".

== Artwork ==
Album's artwork was made sometime in 2004. The picture was taken by John Ricard and features twins (Nicole left, Natalie right) in front of white wall painted in green and black. Nicole wore green blouse with records painted on it and dark blue round earrings. Natalie wore long green earrings and dark brown top. Hair stylist Q, make-up artist Mylah Morales and fashion stylist Malaika Elcock helped twins to get ready (according to Discogs). This was Nina Sky's second album cover to feature their first logotype (the first was the cover for single/EP "Move Ya Body").

== Track listing ==
Nina Sky – Standard edition
| No. | Title | Writer(s) | Producer(s) | Length |
|---|---|---|---|---|
| 1. | "Nina Sky Is..." (Intro) | David Shayman; Luis Diaz; Nicole Albino; Natalie Albino; Jamal Landlord | Supa Dups; Albino; Albino; Cipha Sounds; Disco D | 1:01 |
| 2. | "Move Ya Body" (featuring Jabba) | Albino; Albino; Cordel Burrell; Luis Diaz; Paul George; Curtis Bedeau; Gerald Charles; Brian George; Elijah Wells; Lionel Bermingham | Burell; Albino; Albino; Bedeau; Charles; Wells; Diaz | 3:52 |
| 3. | "You Deserve" (featuring Betty Wright) | Wright; Albino; Albino; Bermingham; Wells | Wright; Wells; Albino; Albino; Bermingham | 3:45 |
| 4. | "Turnin' Me On" | Albino; Albino; Diaz; Shayman; Dwayne Chin-Quee | Cipha Sounds; Disco D; Supa Dups | 3:32 |
| 5. | "Let It Go" | Albino; Albino; Wells; Bermingham | Bermingham; Wells | 4:02 |
| 6. | "Goodbye" (Interlude) | Albino; Albino | Albino; Albino | 1:43 |
| 7. | "Your Time" | Albino; Albino; Shayman; J. McDougal; Wrecia Holloway | Albino; Albino; Diaz | 4:18 |
| 8. | "Runaway" | Shayman; L. Beckles; Diaz; L. Francis; Albino; Albino; R. Carter | Shayman; Beckles; Diaz; Francis; Albino; Albino; Carter | 3:39 |
| 9. | "In a Dream" | Wells; Albino; Albino; Bermingham | Bermingham; Wells | 3:27 |
| 10. | "Surely Missed" | Al Green; Willie Mitchell; Albino; Albino; Diaz; Shayman | Green; Mitchell; Albino; Albino; Diaz | 4:33 |
| 11. | "Temperature's Rising" (Prelude) | Albino; Albino; Bermingham; Wells | Albino; Albino; Bermingham; Wells | 0:59 |
| 12. | "Temperature's Rising" | Albino; Albino; Bermingham; Wells | Albino; Albino; Bermingham; Wells | 5:20 |
| 13. | "Holla Back" | Shayman; Diaz; Albino; Albino | Shayman; Diaz | 3:19 |
| 14. | "Faded Memories" | Albino; Albino; Bermingham; Wells; Nelson Albino | Will Divide | 3:32 |
| Total length: | | | | 47:02 |

Nina Sky – UK and Japanese edition (bonus track)
| No. | Title | Writer(s) | Producer(s) | Length |
|---|---|---|---|---|
| 15. | "Get Up and Dance" | Albino; Albino; Wells; Bermingham | Happy Perez | 3:16 |
| Total length: | | | | 50:18 |

== Sample credits ==
- "Move Ya Body" contains a portion of "Can You Feel the Beat" by Lisa Lisa and Cult Jam featuring Full Force.
- "Your Time" contains a sample from embodies portions of "Let Me Down Easy" performed by Inez Foxx.
- "Runaway" embodies portions of "Walking into Sunshine" by Central Line.
- "Surely Missed" embodies portions of "Something" performed by Al Green.

== Charts ==
| Chart (2004) | Peak position |
|---|---|
| UK Albums (OCC) | 135 |
| US Billboard 200 | 44 |
| US Top R&B/Hip-Hop Albums (Billboard) | 4 |

== Release history ==
| Region | Date | Format | Label |
|---|---|---|---|
| United States | June 22, 2004 | CD; digital download | Universal; Next Plateau |
| Worldwide | June 29, 2004 | CD; digital download | Universal; Next Plateau |
| Japan | August 10, 2004 | CD; digital download | Universal; Next Plateau |
