= Institute of Audio Research =

Defunct educational institution

Coordinates: 40.73310°N 73.99388°W

- New York City; U.S.

Information
- Closed: 2017

The Institute of Audio Research (IAR) was an educational institution in New York City. Students of IAR were offered a wide variety of academic programs in the field of music production and audio engineering. Students could choose from courses in audio electronics, digital music production, mixing music, and audio processing and storage, among others. It was founded in 1969 and closed in 2017, before partially resurfacing as part of Five Towns College in 2022.

== History ==
The Institute of Audio Research was founded in 1969. IAR started as a seminar program for working engineers. By the early 1970s, there was an enormous demand for training from people with no prior background or experience who wanted to find a way into the music recording industry. In response, IAR developed a comprehensive program that allowed the novice, in only about a year, to become qualified for work in a professional recording facility.

It ceased operations on December 31, 2017 after 48 years of providing audio education.

IAR resurfaced as part of Five Towns College in Long Island. Five Towns College now offers a Master's in Professional Studies (M.P.S.) degree, and other audio programs starting in Summer 2022.

== Academics ==
IAR's Audio Recording and Production Program (ARP) was a 900-hour program focused on modern recording technology. Upon successful completion of the program, graduates received a Diploma in Audio Recording and Production. The Audio Recording & Production curriculum was designed so that it could be completed by a full-time student in nine months and by a part-time student in one year.

== Facility ==
The audio school's facilities included a recording studio complex with a 96-input automated digital console, Yamaha grand piano, Hammond C3 organ with Leslie speakers, amps and a full drum set, lab rooms for hands-on signal processing operations, computer applications in audio, post-production suites, and classrooms for lectures and demonstrations. IAR’s facility offered a full range of professional audio equipment, including analog and digital consoles and recorders, vintage and DSP signal processors, digital audio workstations using industry-standard software for MIDI sequencing and digital audio production, digital multitrack automated mixers, and an extensive collection of vintage and current microphones. The all-digital studio featured dual Sony DMX-R100 consoles. IAR’s computer networks featured G3 and G4 Macs, using Pro Tools, Digital Performer, Reason virtual synthesizer software and more. Multiple digital multitrack workstations afford the optimum in hands-on opportunities for students.

== Faculty ==
IAR’s faculty was drawn from the extensive recording talent available in the New York City area. Collectively, they garnered Grammy, Emmy, Tony and Oscar nominations and awards, plus numerous Platinum records and Gold records. The audio engineering and music production curriculum was crafted by faculty members who are deeply involved in music and audio.

== Notable alumni ==
- Benny Blanco - Producer
- OWEL - alternative indie rock band
- DJ Amadeus - DJ and producer
- Mark S. Berry - Producer and remixer
- Jack Douglas - music producer
- Chris Gehringer - mastering engineer
- Hani - DJ and producer
- Jorge González - Musician, composer and producer
- Larry Harlow - pianist, composer, bandleader, music producer, and founding member of Fania All-Stars
- Steven Mandel - Engineer and producer
- Claudio Sanchez - Lead singer and guitarist of Coheed and Cambria
- DJ Yonny - DJ, producer, and remixer for New York City's radio station WNOW-FM
