= DJ Amadeus =

Ukrainian-born DJ and music producer

DJ Amadeus Діджей Амадеус
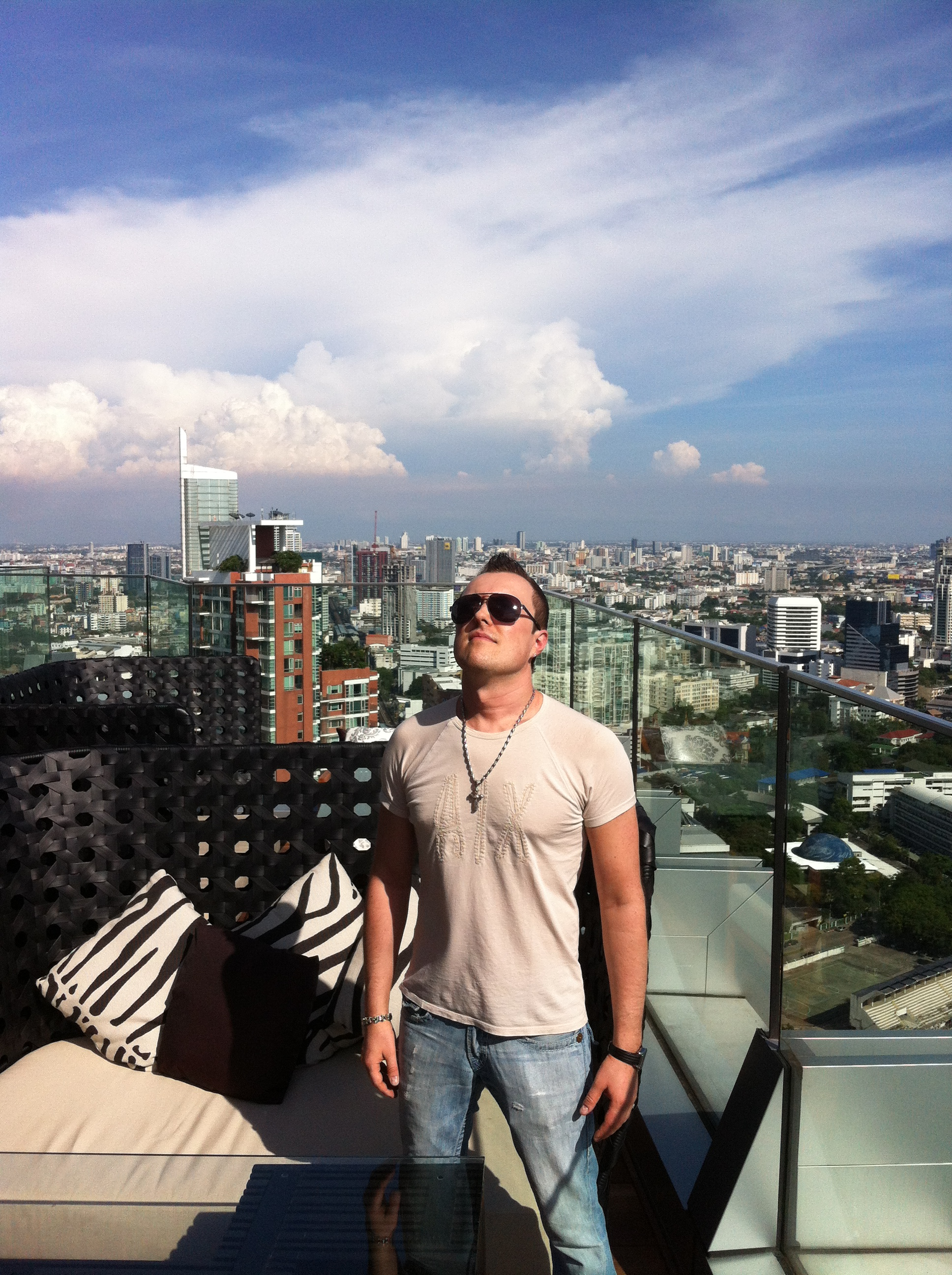

Background information
- Born: Denys Ivanov; 20 July 1976 (age 50); Kharkiv, Ukrainian SSR, Soviet Union (now Ukraine)
- Origin: New York City, New York, United States
- Genres: Electro, House
- Occupations: DJ, Producer
- Labels: Deeper Records NYC, Flash Traxx, HMSPMusic, Eden Recordings, Eyezcream Recordings, Pacha Recordings, Warehouse Recordings, MOSP Recordings, Supermarket Records, Ego Records, Tiger Records, Kontor Records
- Website: djamadeus.com

Denys Ivanov (Note: Ukrainian: Денис Іванов, romanized: Denys Ivanov) (born on 20 July 1976), known by his stage name DJ Amadeus (Note: Ukrainian: Діджей Амадеус, romanized: Didzhei Amadeus), is a Ukrainian-born American DJ and music producer.

== Early life and music career ==
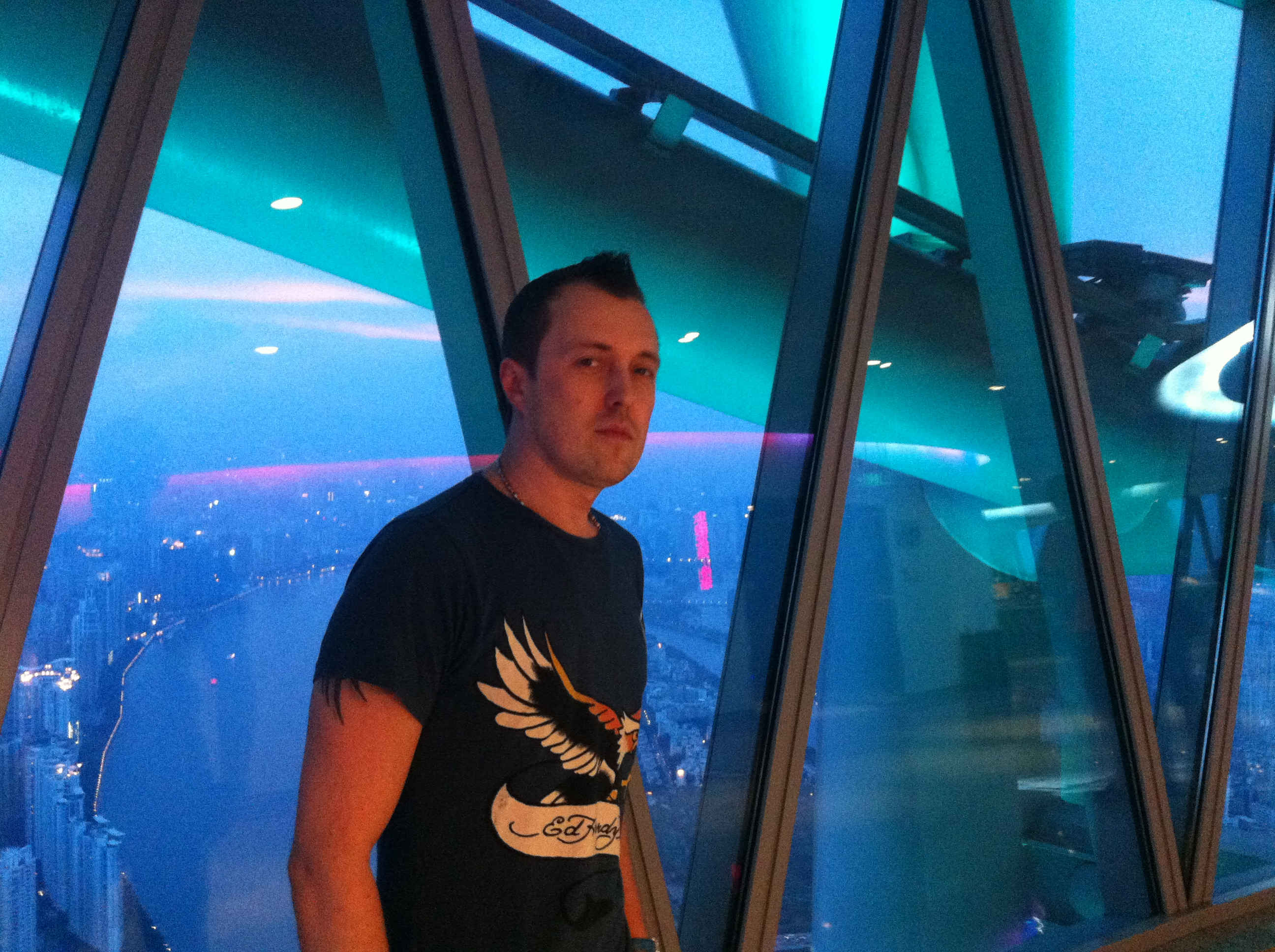
DJ Amadeus

Born in Kharkiv, Ukraine, Denys Ivanov emigrated to the United States with his parents in 1989, when he was 13 years old. The son of two professional singers, he was placed in music school at an early age, studying piano before becoming interested in DJing in the '90s. After DJing in various venues, he became the resident DJ at Tunnel in 1998. In 2000, DJ Amadeus produced his first original track, “The Arrival”, on Jonathan Peters’ Deeper Records NYC. He followed this up with "Let's Bounce", on Flash Traxx in 2002. In 2002, he also became a resident DJ of the Imagine Party at the Carbon/Mirage nightclub, which would later be renamed Exit. In subsequent years, he was the resident DJ for the M2 and the Pink Elephant, and in 2011, he was the resident at Skyroom. Currently DJ Amadeus is releasing his own music and touring, with his two latest tracks, "Must Be That Look" and "Goes Around," released on Germany's Tiger Records.

== Discography ==
=== Releases ===
- “The Arrival” - DJ Amadeus, Deeper Records NYC, 2000
- "Let's Bounce" - DJ Amadeus, Flash Traxx, 2002
- "Computer Virus/Nature of Sound", DJ Amadeus, HMSPMusic, 2006
- Back In Time - The Classics - DJ Amadeus, HMSPMusic, 2006
- Secret Weapon - DJ Amadeus, HMSPMusic, 2006
- Activate - DJ Amadeus, Donald Glaude, Jeff T, The House Moguls, Eden Recordings, 2009
- Don't Let Your Fears - DJ Amadeus Featuring Nora Doncheva, Eyezcream Recordings, 2009
- Something You Know - Benny Maze & DJ Amadeus Featuring Leo, Pacha Recordings, 2010
- Bomb Jack - DJ Amadeus, DJ Gray, Erwin Cregg, Warehouse Recordings, 2011
- Feel So Right - DJ Amadeus & Benny Maze Featuring Oros Duet, MOSP Recordings, 2011
- Acid - Johnny Vicious, Lula, DJ Koutarou.a, DJ Amadeus, Warehouse Recordings, 2012
- Burn - Blake, DJ Amadeus, Johnny Vicious, Warehouse Recordings, 2012
- The Ride EP - DJ Amadeus, Supermarket Records, 2012
- Off The Hook - DJ Amadeus, DJ Gray, Warehouse Recordings, 2012
- "Flashdance... What A Feeling", Richard Grey, DJ Amadeus, House Republic, Ego Records, 2012
- "I Miss You" - DJ Amadeus featuring Amuka, Pacha Recordings, 2012
- "Must Be That Look" - DJ Amadeus, Tiger Records, 2013
- "Goes Around" - Richard Grey, DJ Amadeus, Tiger Records, 2013
- Scream (Big Room Mixes) - DJ Amadeus, Tiger Records, 2013
- "Battleship" - DJ Amadeus, Tiger Records, 2013

=== Selected Compilation Appearances ===
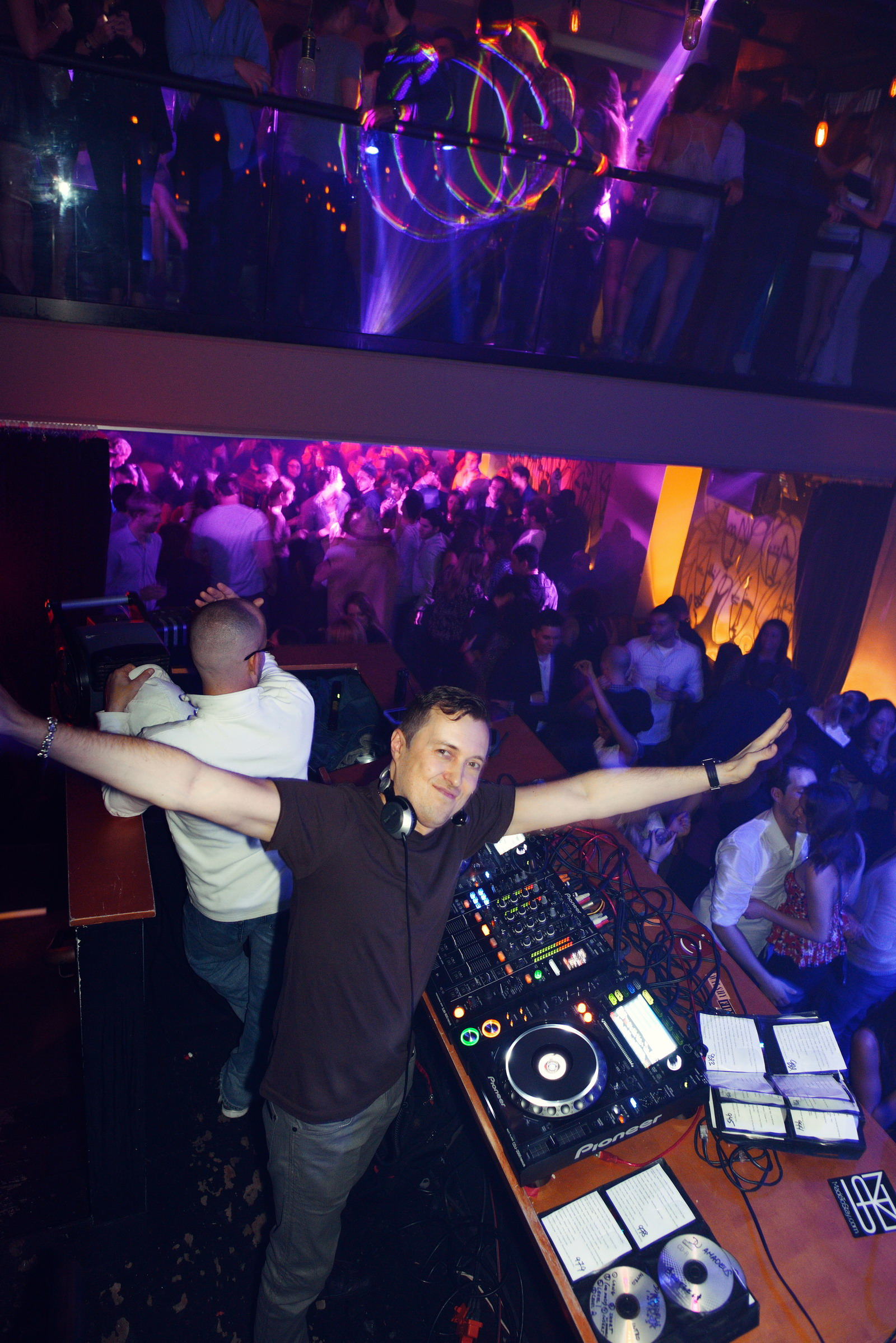
DJ Amadeus

DJ Amadeus has also appeared on a number of compilations.

- "Secret Weapon (Livewater Future Club Mix)", Various Artists - 2006 Year One Volume 3, HMSP Music, 2006
- "You Know (Richard Grey Pacha Dub)", Various Artists - Pacha Pure Dance, New State Music, 2010
- "Something You Know (Richard Grey Pacha Dub Remix)", Various Artists - Pacha - The World's Favourite Club - Summer 2010, Sirup, 2010
- "Something You Know (Richard Grey Pacha Dub Remix)", Juan Diaz - Pacha Ibiza Summer 2010, DJ Magazine, 2010
- "Something You Know (Original Mix)", Various Artists - Adult Entertainment With James Vevers, Pacha Recordings, 2011
- "I Miss You (Alex Pala Remix)", Various Artists - Pacha VIP Vol. 6, Pacha Recordings, 2012
- "Flashdance...What A Feeling (Original Mix)", Various Artists - Ego In Amsterdam, Ego, 2012
- "Flashdance...What A Feeling (Original Mix)", Various Artists - Indahouse Vol. 2, Ego, 2012
- "Flashdance... What A Feeling", Various Artists - Running Trax Summer 2013, Ministry Of Sound (Australia), 2012
- "Flashdance...What A Feeling (Original Mix)", Various Artists - DJ Selection 371: The House Jam Part 104, Do It Yourself Multimedia Group, 2013
- "Flashdance... What A Feeling", Various Artists - For Djs Only 2013/01, Universal Music (Italy), 2013
- "Flashdance...What A Feeling (Original Mix)", Various Artists - Ego In Cote D'Azur, Ego, 2013
- "Must Be That Look (Original Mix)", Various Artists - Festival Anthems Vol. 1, Tiger Records, 2013
- "Goes Around (Original Mix)", Various Artists - Catch A Groove Vol. 6, Roxy Records, 2013
- "Must Be That Look", Various Artists - Ibiza Weapons 2013 Vol. 1, Tiger Records, 2013
- "Must Be That Look", Various Artists - Ibilektro: The Sound of Ibiza 2013, Tiger Records, 2013
- "Scream", Various Artists - Ibiza Weapons 2013 Vol. 2, Tiger Records, 2013
- "Scream", Various Artists - Open Air 2013, LO:GO Recordings, 2013
- "Scream", Various Artists - Festival Sounds, Kontor Records, 2013
- "Battle Ship (Original Mix)", Various Artists - ADE Weapons 2013, Tiger Records, 2013

== Education ==
DJ Amadeus holds a degree in Audio and Studio Engineering and Producing from the Institute of Audio Research.
