= DJ Jabba =

- Born: Steven Beckford; New York City, U.S.
- Origin: Caribbean
- Genres: Reggae; dance

DJ Jabba, born Steven Beckford, is a New York-born and resident radio DJ. He is also an event promoter in Florida and performs in Jamaica, where he was raised. He has hosted a music themed cruise to Jamaica. He hosts and is a co-founder and promoter of the annual Best of the Best show in Miami. He was also featured on American musical duo Nina Sky's hit 2004 single "Move Ya Body".

He hosts the Best of the Best one day reggae and dancehall concert in Florida over Memorial Day Weekend. He hosts a weekend show on Sirius Satellite Radio and hosts the Jabba Hour on Fridays on 93.5 in New York City. He also hosts 'Pull Up Selector' on MTV Tempo in the Caribbean and was in Shottas as Dangols. His radio show in New York is on Sundays from 10 p.m. to 1 a.m. on WQHT's Hot 97.1 'On the Reggae Tip'. He is also the host for his Jabba Strikes Back birthday party at Fiction Fantasy in Kingston, Jamaica. In 2016, he was an organizer for a reggae cruise.
