= Maxi Records =

Maxi Records was an independent dance record label.

Established by Claudia Cuseta and Kevin McHugh in 1990, the New York CIty based label helped establish the House Music scene in the 90s working with producers Mood II Swing, Cevin Fisher, Naked Music NYC, Itaal Shur, Danny Krivit; artists Daphne, Sagat, Big Muff, Judy Albanese; and established names Masters At Work, Danny Tenaglia, Roger Sanchez, Joe Claussell, Francois Kevorkian, Armand Van Helden, Byron Burke, Benji Candelario, and Shay Jones.

The label achieved fame in 1994 with the success of the Sagat single "Funk Dat" . "Funk Dat" went on to sell over half a million copies and reached the top ten of Billboard's Dance Charts.

Following this success, the label expanded their marketing to other cities such as Miami.

Maxi signed a licensing deal with Razor & Tie records in 2000.

The Maxi Records Catalogue was purchased by Nettwerk Music Group in 2015.

== Maxi Singles History ==
- Dawn Martin “Can You Feel The Music”
- Espresso “Ping Pong”/”Let’s get Down”
- SK Project “Your Love Is Taking Me Over”
- SK Project “I’ve Been Searching”
- Deja Vu “Move Your Waistline” / “So Get With It”
- Mello House “The Flower” / “Organ Ride”
- Cocodance “Angels of Love”
- Urbanized featuring Silvano “Helpless (I Don’t Know What To Do Without You)”
- Grand Diva Tour “Find Somebody Else”
- Soul Verite “Chain Me To The Beat”
- Judy Albanese “That Ain’t Right”
- Judy Albanese “Happy”
- Judy Albanese “Love’s Here (At Last)”
- House of Glass featuring Judy Albanese “Take Me Over”
- Daphne “When You Love Someone”
- Daphne “Change”
- Daphne “I Found It”
- Soundshaft “Get Up”
- Eternity featuring Alvoughn Jackson “Real Love”
- Freeek Beat “Chez Vous” / “More”
- Sagat “Why Is It? (Fuk Dat)” / “(Funk Dat)”
- Sagat “Luvstuff”
- Sagat “Get Outta My Face”
- Second Choice “I Can’t Resist”
- Chop N Chan “Sun Children”
- Ms. Monique Renee “Like Any Other Bitch”
- C.L. McSpadden “Plastik Dread” / “Gonna Love” / “I Can’t Stop Going”
- Dream Generation “The Mood”
- Cassanova's Revenge “Banji Dance” / “The Party”
- B.O.P. Ent. Presents BUZZ “Where We At (Together)” / “Hipnotizing” / “La Femma”
- Cevin Fisher “Raise Your Hands” / “Ooh I Like It” / “Musik In My Soul”
- Cevin Fisher “Check This Out”
- Cevin Fisher “The Way We Used To”
- Cevin Fisher “Music Saved My Life”
- Cevin Fisher “Mas Groove”
- Cevin Fisher vs. Jason Jinx “The Way We Used To”
- Armand Van Helden Vs The Horse “Ghetto House Groove”
- Mike Dunn/Tha House of Sound “We Kan Never Be Satisfied”
- Shay Jones “It Doesn’t Matter”
- Shay Jones “Only You”
- Freshly Baked Music /B Lounge “Show Me Your Love” / “Just Can’t Stop” / “Deep Body”
- Soul Station “One Good Reason”
- Soul Station “Fool For Love”
- The New Hippie Movement “The Rhythm”
- The New Hippie Movement “What A Feeling”
- DJ Pierre featuring Sabynaah Pope “Together”
- Studio Filthy Whore “Open Me Up”
- Papp/Warrin “Santos” / “Let Me Be”
- Nick Jones & Acei Carter “Deidre”
- All Good Funk Alliance “Sol En La Noche” / “Last Jam At 1450” / “A Song Called Hey” / “Disco Hash”
- Nick Jones “Something About The Music” / “Dedication”
- Nick Jones & Acei Carter “Shake It” / “Can You Feel It”
- Listenin’ Parlor “Untitled” / “Deeper”
- Andy And The Lamboy “Dancin’” / “Weo Weo”
- Brian Bristol “Ear Candy”
- Byron Burke Presents Komputer Kidz “Rude Train” / “Harmattan”
- Byron Burke “String Section”
- Deepswing featuring Greyling Presely “Get Up!”
- Lofty Love Presents Filter “Running Away” / “The Deep Project”
- Crash Connection “Stardust” / “Hazy days” / “Saturday”
- Naked Music feat Nikki St. Nicholas “Music Is My Life”
- Naked Music featuring Katrina Vaughn “Deep Day”
- Big Muff “My Funny Valentine”
- Big Muff “Pornstar”
- Big Muff “Feel What You Know”
- Big Muff “So Far Away”
