= A Night at the Booty Bar =

Studio album by Disco D
- Released: April 22, 2003
- Recorded: 2002–2003
- Label: Tommy Boy
- Producer: Disco D

Disco D chronology
Straight Out tha Trunk (2001)	A Night at the Booty Bar (2003)

Professional ratings
Review scores
Source	Rating
AllMusic	3.5/5 stars

A Night at the Booty Bar is a mix album by Disco D. It is known for its explicitly sexual, vulgar lyrics.

== Track listing ==
1. "Dem Tatas (Intro)" (DJ Deeon) – 2:16
2. "Fuck Me on the Dance Floor" (Disco D, Princess Superstar) – 2:43
3. "Wait a Minute" (DJ Nasty) – 1:27
4. "Sydetrack" (Erotek) – 0:24
5. "Lola Damone Freestyle" (Disco D) – 1:15
6. "Gimme Head" (DJ Deeon) – 2:05
7. "I'm a Ho" (Disco D, DJ Slugo) – 1:40
8. "Get the F*** Up" (Waxmaster) – 1:39
9. "Booty Bar Anthem" (Disco D, DJ Profit) – 1:29
10. "Peon" (Disco D, Helluva) – 3:33
11. "Hydraulic Style" (DJ Nasty) – 1:55
12. "Peace Out" (Technician) – 1:50
13. "I Can Make You Dub" (Solace, DJ Zap) – 1:39
14. "You Need Another Drink" (Disco D, Chuck-EE) – 1:38
15. "Pump Push Pull" (DJ Nehpets) – 1:23
16. "Fuck Me Freak Me" (DJ Profit) – 1:26
17. "Hottest of the Hot [Disco D Remix]" (BG) – 4:28
18. "Suck It" (DJ Deeon) – 1:20
19. "DJs Lay It Down" (DJ Nehpets) – 0:37
20. "I Wanna Slut" (DJ Fatman) – 1:27
21. "Make Them B_T_H_S" (DJ Skip) – 0:49
22. "Ass-N-Titties" (DJ Assault) – 2:39
23. "Pussy [Disco D Remix]" (Lords Of Acid) – 2:27
24. "Detroit Zoo" (Disco D, Paradime) – 2:51
25. "Puff Puff Pass [Remix]" (DJ Nasty) – 2:25
26. "Work Them Beats" (Helluva Freestyle, Disco D) – 0:37
27. "Pushin' Dik" (DJ Deeon) – 2:14
28. "Keys to the Whip" (Disco D, Helluva, Daffney) – 1:15
29. "Keys to the Whip [Straight Pimpin' Mix]" (Disco D, Lola Damone, Helluva) – 3:46
30. "Outro" (Disco D) – 2:21
