= The Other Side (Nina Sky EP) =

EP by Nina Sky
- Released: August 3, 2010
- Recorded: 2010
- Genres: Dance-pop; reggae; freestyle; electropop; R&B; house
- Length: 24:32
- Label: Independent
- Producers: Nicole Albino; Natalie Albino; DJ Yonny; Salaam Remi; Double O; Kidz in the Hall; Damian Major; David Berrie; MeLo-X

Nina Sky chronology
La Conexion (2005)	The Other Side (2010)	Nicole & Natalie (2012)

Singles from The Other Side
- 1. "You Ain't Got It (Funk That)" Released: July 8, 2010

The Other Side is an independently released EP by Nina Sky. After a falling-out with their record label, Polo Grounds Records, over the release of their second album Starting Today, they decided to release this EP independently through their official website. It features a remix of "Beautiful People", a song originally planned to be the lead single off Starting Today. The lead single of the EP is "You Ain't Got It (Funk That)" which samples Sagat's minor 1994 hit "Funk Dat". "Love Song" is a cover of the US top ten pop hit by The Cure from August 1989.

With a new masculine (and as the public termed "butched up") style, the duo independently released an 8 track EP for digital download in August, entitled The Other Side, which features production from DJ Yonny, Salaam Remi, Kidz in the Hall and many more. A video for the lead-single, "You Ain't Got It (Funk That)" was also released. In early 2011 they worked with Creep on their song "You". On May 16, they released the music video on their official website.

== Background ==
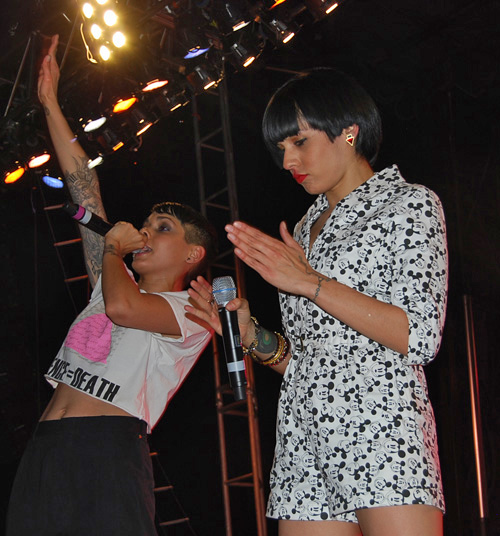
Nina Sky performing at the Phoenix Pride Festival on April 17, 2010

In May 2007, Nina Sky released a new single "Get Your Clothes Off" as a lead single from their unreleased album Starting Today which was due to release on July 27, 2007. On August 12, 2008 another single came out, "Curtain Call". It became a minor hit but no music video was released. On January 15, 2009 they performed the third single from upcoming album titled "On Some Bullshit". On April 8, the music video for the song was released. In mid-2009, Nina Sky were in battle with their second label Polo Grounds over releasing their second studio album Starting Today. They have recorded more than 100 songs for their album. They soon wrote on Twitter: "Starting a new campaign today... 'Nina Sky Doesn't Play Polo. For months we've had complete album, ready for release. Y'all wanna know what's relly goin' on? Nothing [and] that's the problem. We released [two] videos and singles without support from our label. All good... Stayed positive. After months of no movement, we asked to be released [and] still nothing. No acknowledgmengt from the President of our label, Bryan Leach. Bottom line, we want to be released. If you're really down with our movement, holler [at] Bryan Leach". On January 28, 2010 Nina Sky released new music video for the song "Beautiful People" which was released as a single on July 5, 2009.

== Release and promotion ==
EP was released on Nina Sky's official website on August 3, 2010 for digital download. It was promoted by a single "You Ain't Got It (Funk That)". Single was released on July 8. It sampled Sagat's song "Funk Dat".

== Track listing ==
No.	Title	Writer(s)	Producer(s)	Length
1.	"The Other Side"	Nicole Albino; Natalie Albino	DJ Yonny	3:18
2.	"You Ain't Got It (Funk That)"	Albino; Albino	DJ Yonny	2:59
3.	"Too Long to Let Go"	Albino; Albino	Salaam Remi	3:03
4.	"Beautiful People" (Remix)	Albino; Albino	Damian Major; David Berrie	4:08
5.	"Only You (Take Me Away)" (featuring Naledge of Kidz in the Hall)	Albino; Albino; Jabari Evans	Double "O"	4:08
6.	"Never Look Back"	Albino; Albino	DJ Yonny	0:58
7.	"Love Song"	Robert Smith; Simon Gallup; Porl Thompson; Roger O'Donnell; Boris Williams; Lol Tolhurst	Double O	2:37
8.	"You Ain't Got It (Funk That)" (Remix) (featuring MeLo-X)	Albino; Albino; MeLo-X	DJ Yonny; MeLo-X	3:21
