= Valadez =

Valadez or Valadéz is a surname. Notable people with the surname include:

- Fernanda Valadez (born 1981), Mexican filmmaker
- Francisco Macías Valadéz, Mexican scouting leader
- Ismael Valadéz (born 1985), Mexican footballer
- Rebecca Valadez (born 1975), American singer and actress
- Lucero Valadez (born 1999), Ms. Calhoun and Drama Queen

== See also ==
- Valdez (surname)
