= Disco D =

American music producer (1980–2007)

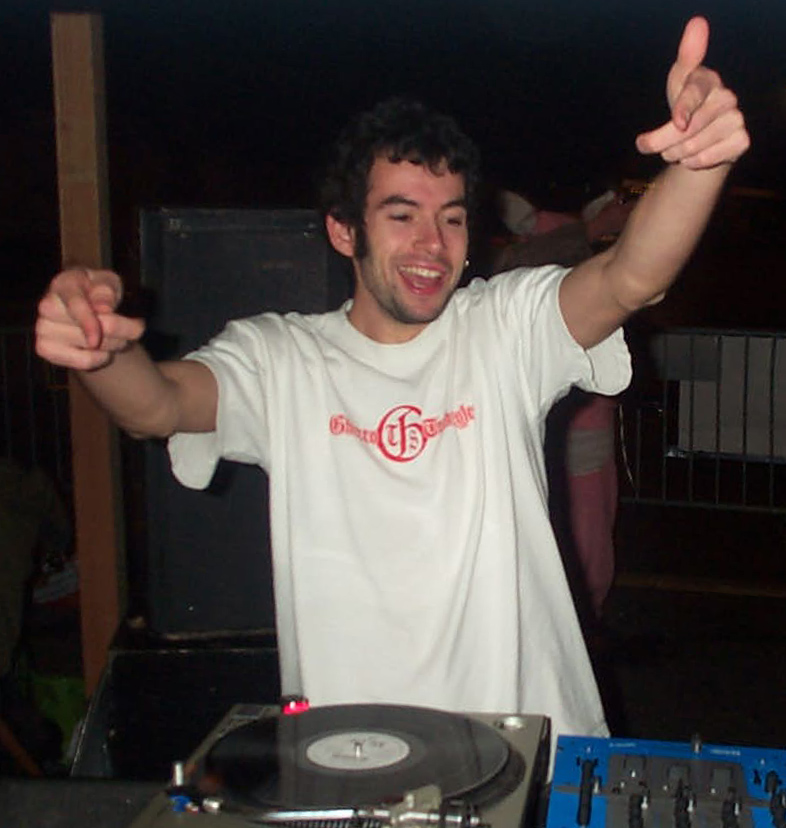
- Disco D at Burning Man Decompression, 2002

Background information
- Born: David Aaron Shayman; September 21, 1980; St. Louis, Missouri, U.S.
- Origin: Ann Arbor, Michigan, U.S.
- Died: January 23, 2007 (aged 26) Washington, D.C., U.S.
- Genres: Electronic; techno; ghettotech; hip hop
- Occupations: Record producer; composer
- Years active: 1995–2007

David Aaron Shayman (September 21, 1980 – January 23, 2007), better known by his stage name Disco D, was an American record producer and composer. He started as a teenage DJ in Ann Arbor, Michigan, where he helped DJ Godfather popularize the Detroit electronic music called "Ghettotech".

== Early years ==
Shayman was born on September 21, 1980, in St. Louis, Missouri, to Deborah and James A. Shayman. He had one sister Becky, and four step-siblings. At age 6, Shayman moved to Ann Arbor, Michigan. His family was involved with the temple Beth Emet, where he attended Hebrew school until his bar mitzvah.

== Career ==
Shayman's career began in 1995 while a student at Pioneer High School in Ann Arbor, when he purchased his first set of belt driven turntables, with pitch control. He mastered the art of DJing almost immediately. In the beginning he was heavily influenced by "booty" electro. He quickly became a regular customer at the local Ann Arbor vinyl stores, where he began to network with many of the local DJ's, this led to the release of his first mix CD collaborated with D.J. Marquis. He DJ'd at many local college house parties, at The University of Michigan as well as at The Blind Pig, while also studying jazz saxophone for two years at Ann Arbor's alternative Community High School. By 1997, he was performing nationally as a DJ, had established his first production company, and released his first 12-inch single.

In 1998, Shayman began studying at the Ross School of Business at the University of Michigan. While he outwardly pursued management studies, he remained interested by the sciences. As a teenager he worked in a genetics lab at the University of Michigan. He also aspired to make a trip to the North Pole. In 1999, Shayman was a key player in the founding of Ghostly International, having co-produced the record label's first single, "Hands Up for Detroit" in October 1999 (billed with Matthew Dear as Daisha, a Shayman alias). In addition to finding his own GTI Recordings ("Ghetto Tech Institute" Recordings), he eventually began releasing music on the Bad Boy Bill's Muzik/Mixconnection label and the Tommy Boy label. During this period, he also became known for his turntable skills and multi-genre sets.

=== New York operations ===
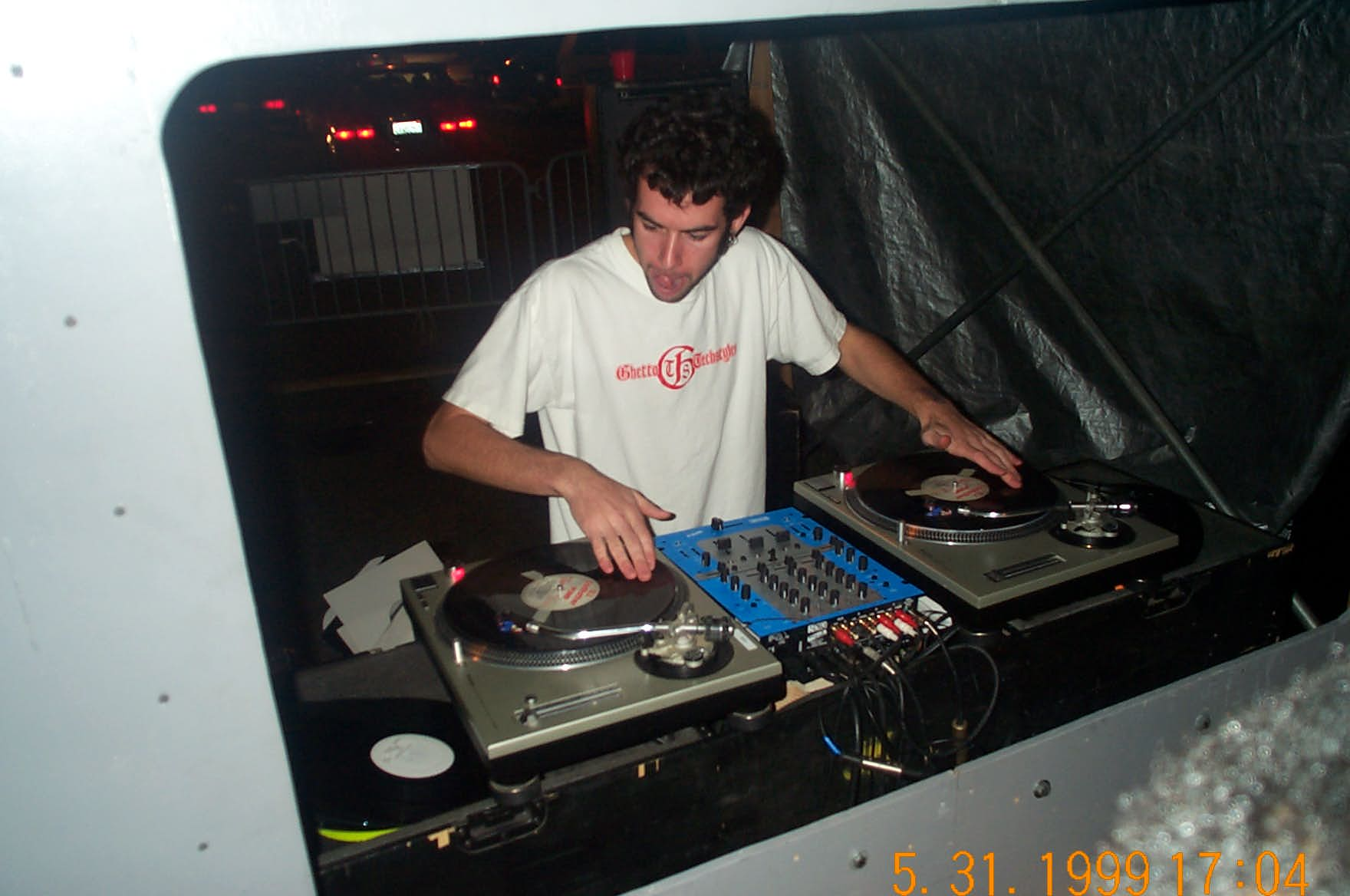
Disco D performing live, 1999

After graduating from the Ross School of Business at the University of Michigan in 2002 at age 22, Shayman moved to Brooklyn, New York, with a goal of producing beats for major hip hop artists. In his Williamsburg neighborhood home recording studio, Shayman started Booty Bar Records, a record label and night club in New York City.

In the summer of 2002, Shayman released "Booty Bar Anthem EP," which featured tracks such as "Booty Bar Anthem" and "Keys to the Whip."

He also branched out as a producer of hip hop, R&B, and dancehall tracks for mainstream artists. By June 2003, Shayman worked with Princess Superstar and remixed artists ranging from 50 Cent and B.G. to Lords of Acid and Da Brat's single, "Boom."

In early 2003, he produced and promoted his mix CD, A Night at the Booty Bar. Developed as a play on A Night at the Playboy Mansion (2000) by Dimitri from Paris, the mix featured collaboration with Princess Superstar.

Shayman became engaged to Luciana Vendramini, a Brazilian model who had appeared on the December 1987 cover of the Brazilian issue of Playboy magazine. Shayman spent time in Brazil with his fiancée to become more familiar with Funk Carioca, a type of dance music from Rio de Janeiro. By 2005, he covered a wide range of music, such as Jamaican dancehall music and Maryland's Baltimore Club music.

=== Mobile music 2005 ===
Prior to 2005, most ring tones were based on polyphonic or even cruder monophonic tones because that was what most cell phone handsets could play. However, with snippets of existing songs and compositions generating more than $2 billion in annual worldwide revenues in 2005 as ring tones, cell phone handset manufacturers began producing handsets capable of replaying the upper and lower notes from a song's melody without tinny-sounding bleats. In early 2005, retailer Best Buy turned music Shayman had written for one of its commercials into a ring tone and offered it on the Best Buy website. From this, Shayman was one of the first to recognize the business potential in composing original ring tone material exclusively for cell phones and collaborated in 2005 with music producer Eddie O'Loughlin, and singer/songwriter Dee Robert in the new mobile music art form to produce original ring tones for Jamba!.

=== Kevin Federline work ===
In 2005, Shayman produced "Y'all Ain't Ready", the first single from Britney Spears' then-husband Kevin Federline. In October 2005, Shayman made his way to Australia to play at clubs such as Honkytonks in Melbourne, where he was best known for A Night at the Booty Bar. In November 2005, a sample of this single was posted on Disco D's website, which brought almost immediate criticism upon Federline's single. Although the less-than-one-minute sample was quickly removed from the site, it resurfaced on Stereogum.com.

On January 1, 2006, Federline released the single "PopoZão," which Shayman produced. However, none of his efforts appeared on Federline's debut album Playing with Fire when it was released on October 31, 2006. In addition, virtually all references to Federline were deleted from Shayman's website at that time.

=== Return from Australia ===
On returning to the United States from his 2005 Australian trek, Shayman went public about his struggle with bipolar disorder. "A lot of people who have suffered from similar experiences thanked me for being so open," he said. In late 2006, he launched the new Brazilian urban label Gringo Louco with Braza, a bilingual supergroup composed of three of the biggest rappers from Brazil.

== Death ==
Shayman died by suicide on January 23, 2007, aged 26 years old. In response to his death, Ghostly International CEO Sam Valenti IV stated:

"Dave was an inspiration and a mentor to me. No one worked harder or wanted to seize life more than him. He was a relentlessly creative, passionate and ambitious artist whose passion for music illuminated everything he touched."

== Other work ==
Shayman produced tracks for mainstream artists such as AZ ("City of Gods" from A.W.O.L.), 50 Cent ("Ski Mask Way" from The Massacre), Nina Sky ("Turnin' Me On"), Trick Daddy ("I Pop"), Chamillionaire ("Rock Star ft. Lil Wayne", which went unreleased) and Lil Scrappy. He wrote the theme music for VH1's "Hip Hop Honors" for all three years of the show. He also recorded commercial tracks for Best Buy, Comedy Central, Nickelodeon, Nike, Sprite and Xbox. He worked with Kagi Media throughout 2006 to create "HUSTLE HARDER XXL", a hybrid of instructional and documentary footage on DVD Video, which also included a music production sample library from his personal collection. He was an avid user of Akai MPC4000, and had one tattooed on his arm.

Shayman also invested in the aLeda rolling paper, the first clear cellulose rolling paper, which he brought to America from Brazil as its American sales manager/distributor.

He was also acknowledged as a major mentor to producer Benny Blanco in Blanco's formative years in the industry. In honor of Shayman, Benny subsequently named his puppy "Disco".

== Discography ==
- Detroit Zoo, by Disco D vs. Paradime (November 21, 2000)
- Straight Out Tha Trunk, GTI Recordings (October 23, 2001)
- Booty Bar Anthem EP, Booty Bar (Summer 2002)
- A Night at the Booty Bar, Tommy Boy Records (April 22, 2003)
- Ghettotech for Slow People, Gringo Louco (April 24, 2006)
