= Move Ya Body =

2004 single by Nina Sky

Single by Nina Sky featuring Jabba

from the album Nina Sky
- B-side: "In a Dream"
- Released: April 12, 2004
- Recorded: 2003
- Studio: The Hit Factory (New York City)
- Genre: Dancehall; freestyle
- Length: 3:52
- Label: Universal; Next Plateau
- Songwriters: Nicole Albino; Natalie Albino; Cordel Burrell; Luis Diaz; Paul George; Curtis Bedeau; Gerald Charles; Brian George; Elijah Wells; Lionel Bermingham
- Producers: Elijah Wells; Lionel Bermingham

Nina Sky singles chronology
"Move Ya Body" (2004)	"Oye Mi Canto" (2004)

Music video
- "Nina Sky - Move Ya Body (Official Music Video) ft. Jabba" on YouTube

"Move Ya Body" is a song by Puerto Rican-American musical duo Nina Sky, released as their debut single on April 12, 2004. Featuring guest vocals from American-Jamaican DJ Jabba, it served as the lead single from Nina Sky's self-titled debut album (2004). The song became the duo's only solo single to reach the top 40 of the Billboard Hot 100. The song was ranked at number 250 on Blender's "500 Greatest Songs Since You Were Born" and is well known for the use of the recurring ostinato on the bongos known as the "Coolie Dance" riddim. This has been the subject and musical motif of many musical samples.

The song also contains lyrics from Lisa Lisa and Cult Jam's song, "Can You Feel the Beat". The title of Lisa Lisa and Cult Jam's song was repeated many times during the song.

== Background ==
Record producer the Jettsonz introduced Nina Sky to Cipha Sounds, a hip hop DJ. Cipha Sounds was impressed when he heard the girls sing and suggested that they compose a song using the "Coolie Dance" riddim. The twins wrote "Move Ya Body" in response, and recorded a demo. The demo got them signed as Nina Sky to Next Plateau Entertainment and Universal Records. After writing "Move Ya Body", Nina Sky quickly wrote more songs to form their debut album Nina Sky, released in June 2004.

== Critical reception ==
The song was ranked the 29th best song of 2004 by Pitchfork.

== Commercial performance ==
"Move Ya Body" charted at number four on the US US Billboard Hot 100 and was ranked number 22 on the 2004 Billboard year-end Chart. It also reached number six on the UK Singles Chart. It was certified gold by both the Recording Industry Association of America (RIAA) and the British Phonographic Industry (BPI), as well as platinum by Recorded Music NZ (RMNZ). It also reached the top 10 in Denmark, Germany, the Netherlands, New Zealand, Wallonia and on the Billboard Mainstream Top 40 and Rhythmic Top 40 charts. The song earned the duo two nominations for International Dance Music Awards (Best Pop Dance Track and Best New Dance Artist (Group)) and one nomination for Soul Train Lady of Soul Award (Best R&B/Soul Single, Group, Band or Duo), all in 2005. They won one award for the song: the Rapgra Award (Utwor R'n'B) in 2004.

== Music video ==
An accompanying music video for the song was released in 2004. Posted in 2012, it was viewed over two million times on YouTube. However it was never posted on Nina Sky's official channel and it became unavailable a few years later. The video was 34 seconds shorter than the song. It features guest appearances from Jabba, Fat Joe, Cipha Sounds and Angie Martinez. The whole video takes place in a nightclub and features the twins, mostly singing and dancing to the song.

== Awards and nominations ==
Year	Award	Category	Result
2004	Rapgra Awards	Utwor R'n'B	Won
2005	International Dance Music Awards	Best Pop Dance Track	Nominated
2005	International Dance Music Awards	Best New Dance Artist (Group)	Nominated
2005	Soul Train Lady of Soul Awards	Best R&B/Soul Single, Group, Band or Duo	Nominated

== Track listings ==
- US maxi-CD single
1. "Move Ya Body" (radio edit) – 3:30
2. "Move Ya Body" (instrumental) – 3:30
3. "Move Ya Body" (call out hook) – 0:19
4. "In a Dream" (radio edit) – 3:25
5. "In a Dream" (a cappella) – 3:25
- US 12-inch single

A1. "Move Ya Body" (radio edit) – 3:30
A2. "Move Ya Body" (instrumental) – 3:30
B1. "In a Dream" (radio edit) – 3:25
B2. "In a Dream" (a capella) – 3:25

- UK and Australian CD single
1. "Move Ya Body" – 3:30
2. "Move Ya Body" (Hyperspace remix) – 4:28
3. "In a Dream" – 3:25
4. "Move Ya Body" (video)

- UK 12-inch single

A1. "Move Ya Body" – 3:56
A2. "Move Ya Body" (Hyperspace remix) – 4:28
B1. "Move Ya Body" (instrumental) – 3:30
B2. "Move Ya Body" (a capella) – 3:37

- European CD single
1. "Move Ya Body" – 3:30
2. "In a Dream" – 3:25
- European maxi-CD single
1. "Move Ya Body" (radio edit) – 3:30
2. "Move Ya Body" (Jiggy Joint radio mix) – 3:30
3. "In a Dream" (radio edit) – 3:25
4. "Move Ya Body (album version video) – 4:30

== Charts ==
=== Weekly charts ===
Chart (2004)	Peak position
Australia (ARIA)	25
Australian Urban (ARIA)	6
Austria (Ö3 Austria Top 40)	20
Belgium (Ultratop 50 Flanders)	11
Belgium (Ultratop 50 Wallonia)	5
Canada CHR/Pop Top 30 (Radio & Records)	3
Croatia (HRT)	1
Denmark (Tracklisten)	7
Europe (Eurochart Hot 100)	7
France (SNEP)	21
Germany (GfK)	7
Hungary (Dance Top 40)	31
Ireland (IRMA)	22
Italy (FIMI)	16
Netherlands (Dutch Top 40)	4
Netherlands (Single Top 100)	5
New Zealand (Recorded Music NZ)	6
Norway (VG-lista)	15
Romania (Romanian Top 100)	37
Scottish Singles Sales (Official Charts)	22
Sweden (Sverigetopplistan)	31
Switzerland (Schweizer Hitparade)	2
UK Singles (Official Charts)	6
UK Hip Hop/R&B (Official Charts)	2
US Billboard Hot 100	4
US Dance Airplay (Billboard)	1
US Hot R&B/Hip-Hop Songs (Billboard)	14
US Pop Airplay (Billboard)	5
US Rhythmic Airplay (Billboard)	6

=== Year-end charts ===
Chart (2004)	Position
Belgium (Ultratop 50 Flanders)	68
Belgium (Ultratop 50 Wallonia)	53
Germany (Media Control GfK)	60
Netherlands (Dutch Top 40)	33
Netherlands (Single Top 100)	47
Switzerland (Schweizer Hitparade)	29
UK Singles (OCC)	83
UK Urban (Music Week)	14
US Billboard Hot 100	22
US Dance Radio Airplay (Billboard)	4
US Hot R&B/Hip-Hop Singles & Tracks (Billboard)	57
US Mainstream Top 40 (Billboard)	27
US Rhythmic Top 40 (Billboard)	18

== Certifications ==
Region	Certification	Certified units/sales
New Zealand (RMNZ)	Platinum	30,000^{‡}
United Kingdom (BPI)	Gold	400,000^{‡}
United States (RIAA)	Gold	500,000^{*}
^{*} Sales figures based on certification alone.^{‡} Sales+streaming figures based on certification alone.

== Release history ==
Region	Date	Format(s)	Label(s)	Ref.
United States	April 12, 2004	Rhythmic contemporary; urban radio	Universal; Next Plateau	
United States	May 10, 2004	Contemporary hit radio	Universal; Next Plateau	
United Kingdom	July 5, 2004	12-inch vinyl; CD	Universal; Next Plateau	

== See also ==
- List of number-one dance airplay hits of 2004 (U.S.)
