= James A. Shayman =

Scientist

- Occupations: Physician scientist, nephrologist, and pharmacologist

Academic background
- Education: Cornell University; Washington University School of Medicine

James Alan Shayman is an American physician scientist, nephrologist, and pharmacologist. He is Professor of Internal Medicine and Pharmacology and the Agnes C. And Frank D. McKay Professor at the Medical School of the University of Michigan. He also serves as a staff nephrologist at the Ann Arbor Veterans Administration Medical Center.

Shayman's research interests span the study of lysosomal biology and related disorders. His group is most known for the development of small-molecule inhibitors of glycosphingolipid synthesis and their use in lysosomal glycosphingolipid storage disorders. His team also discovered and characterized a novel lysosomal phospholipase A2, PLA2G15 and is investigating its role in phospholipidosis. He has published over 160 articles.

Shayman is a Fellow of the American Heart Association and American Society of Nephrology as well as a Life Fellow of Clare Hall at the University of Cambridge. He has served as an Associate Editor for the Journal of Clinical Investigation and Translational Research and is serving in the same role for the Journal of the American Society of Nephrology.

== Education and early career ==
Shayman obtained a Bachelor of Arts degree from Cornell University in 1976, and received an M.D. in 1980 from Washington University in St. Louis. From July 1980 to June 1983, he served as a house officer in Medicine at Barnes Hospital in St. Louis, Missouri. Beginning in 1983, he pursued a Postdoctoral Fellowship with a specialization in Nephrology and Pharmacology under the mentorship of Aubrey Morrison and Oliver H. Lowry at Washington University School of Medicine in St. Louis.

== Career ==
Following his post-doctoral fellowship training, in 1985, Shayman began his academic career as an instructor in the Renal department of Washington University School of Medicine. He was recruited to the University of Michigan where from 1986 to 1992 he was appointed as assistant professor in the Department of Internal Medicine, Division of Nephrology. He subsequently was promoted to the positions of associate professor in 1992 and professor in 1997, respectively with a secondary appointment in Pharmacology. He has been serving as the Agnes C. and Frank D. McKay Professor.

Shayman was the Associate Chair for Research Programs at the Department of Internal Medicine and Associate Vice President for Research in Health Sciences of the University of Michigan. In addition, he has been serving as a staff nephrologist Veterans Administration Medical Center in Michigan.

== Research ==
Shayman's research is focused on lysosomal biology, the pathophysiology of traditional lysosomal storage disorders, and the role of the lysosome in more prevalent diseases including diabetes mellitus and polycystic kidney disease. A particular emphasis has been on the development of drug therapeutics for disorders of glycosphingolipid metabolism. This work has resulted in several patents including "Amino ceramide-like compounds and therapeutic methods of use" and "Pyridine inhibitors of glucosylceramide synthase and therapeutic methods using the same."

=== Substrate reduction therapy ===
An early collaboration with Norman Radin focused on substrate reduction as an alternative to enzyme replacement therapy for the treatment of lysosomal disorders such as Gaucher disease. It was suggested that substrate reduction posits that inhibition of metabolites that accumulate in the lysosome due to the loss of activity of a specific hydrolase can be treated with reversible inhibitors of specific anabolic enzymes. Following an early collaboration with Radin, the Shayman group went on to develop inhibitors of glucosylceramide synthase followed by proof of concept studies in models of Gaucher and Fabry disease that experimentally established the viability substrate reduction therapy. Although this concept was initially met with skepticism from the academic and pharmaceutical communities, these compounds were eventually licensed to the Genzyme Corporation for clinical development in 2000. In 2014 eliglustat tartrate was approved by the Food and Drug Administration and the European Medicines Association. Eliglustat tartrate was the first orally bioavailable agent approved as the first stand-alone substrate reduction therapy for Gaucher disease type 1.

=== Glycosphingolipid synthesis inhibitor ===
Shayman's work on developing the "first in class" glycosphingolipid synthesis inhibitor led to the consideration of whether more common disorders might be amenable to targeting glucosylceramide synthase. Based on fundamental studies by his group and others demonstrating a role for glucosylceramide metabolism in conditions associated with aerobic glycolysis, including diabetes and polycystic kidney disease, glucosylceramide synthase inhibitors have been the focus of preclinical and clinical studies evaluating the potential for extended use applications of eliglustat and related compounds.

=== Brain penetrant glycolipid synthesis inhibitors ===
In collaboration with Scott D. Larsen, Shayman's work has also been directed toward the identification of brain-penetrant glycolipid synthesis inhibitors for the treatment of Gaucher disease types 2 and 3, GM2 gangliosidoses including Tay-Sachs and Sandhoff disease, and GM1 gangliosidosis. Using computational analysis comparing eliglustat to known CNS penetrant compounds, novel glucosylceramide synthase inhibitors were designed around the eliglustat pharmacophore, demonstrating the lower glucosylceramide and ganglioside levels within the brain.

=== Vasculopathy of fabry disease ===
The Shayman group has worked on the elucidation of the mechanisms underlying the vasculopathy of Fabry disease. His initial work led to the identification of three inducible models of vascular disease in the alpha-galactosidase A knockout mouse. These models included oxidant-induced arterial thrombosis, accelerated atherogenesis, and impaired arterial relaxation. Both decreased nitric oxide bioavailability and endothelial nitric oxide synthase uncoupling have been demonstrated to underlie these abnormalities. The insights led to identifying 3-nitrotyrosine as a biomarker for endothelial dysfunction in both experimental models and patients affected by classic forms of Fabry disease.

=== PLA2GXV ===
Attempts to delineate potential off-target effects of eliglustat led to the discovery of a novel lysosomal hydrolase, phospholipase A2 group XV (PLA2GXV). This enzyme was initially identified as a transacylase and named 1-O-acylceramide synthase. PLA2GXV is 50 percent identical to LCAT. In collaboration with John Tesmer and colleagues, the structure of PLA2GXV and, by extension, of lecithin cholesterol acyltransferase (LCAT) were solved. Mice engineered to be deficient in PLA2GXV developed a pulmonary phenotype associated with the conversion of alveolar macrophages to foam cells, a phenotype that resembles amiodarone toxicity. A 2021 work has also identified PLA2GXV as the site of action for many drugs that cause a form of toxicity termed phospholipidosis.

== Awards and honors ==
- 1991 – Henry Christian Award, American Federation for Clinical Research
- 1994 – Elected Member, American Society for Clinical Investigation
- 2000 – Elected Member, Association of American Physicians
- 2001 – Fellow, American Heart Association
- 2003 – Fellow, American Society of Nephrology
- 2016 – Distinguished University Innovator Award, University of Michigan
- 2020 – Life Fellow, Clare Hall, University of Cambridge

== Bibliography ==
=== Selected books ===
- Renal Pathophysiology (1995) ISBN 978-0397513727
- Essentials of Internal Medicine (2000) ISBN 978-0781719377

=== Selected articles ===
- Rani CS, Abe A, Chang Y, Rosenzweig N, Saltiel AR, Radin NS, and Shayman JA. Cell cycle arrest induced by an inhibitor of glucosylceramide synthase. Correlation with cyclin-dependent kinases. J Biol Chem. 1995;270(6):2859-67.
- Abe A, Shayman JA, and Radin NS. A novel enzyme that catalyzes the esterification of N-acetylsphingosine. Metabolism of C2-ceramides. J Biol Chem. 1996;271(24):14383-9.
- Abe A, and Shayman JA. Purification and characterization of 1-O-acylceramide synthase, a novel phospholipase A2 with transacylase activity. J Biol Chem. 1998;273(14):8467-74.
- Lee L, Abe A, and Shayman JA. Improved inhibitors of glucosylceramide synthase. J Biol Chem. 1999;274(21):14662-9.
- Abe A, Gregory S, Lee L, Killen PD, Brady RO, Kulkarni A, and Shayman JA. Reduction of globotriaosylceramide in Fabry disease mice by substrate deprivation. J Clin Invest. 2000;105(11):1563-71.
- Hiraoka M, Abe A, and Shayman JA. Cloning and characterization of a lysosomal phospholipase A2, 1-O-acylceramide synthase. J Biol Chem. 2002;277(12):10090-9.
- Eitzman DT, Bodary PF, Shen Y, Khairallah CG, Wild SR, Abe A, Shaffer-Hartman J, and Shayman JA. Fabry disease in mice is associated with age-dependent susceptibility to vascular thrombosis. J Am Soc Nephrol. 2003;14(2):298-302.
- Hiraoka M, Abe A, and Shayman JA. Structure and function of lysosomal phospholipase A2: identification of the catalytic triad and the role of cysteine residues. J Lipid Res. 2005;46(11):2441-7.
- Abe A, Hiraoka M, and Shayman JA. A role for lysosomal phospholipase A2 in drug induced phospholipidosis. Drug Metab Lett. 2007;1(1):49-53.
- Shayman JA. ELIGLUSTAT TARTRATE: Glucosylceramide Synthase Inhibitor Treatment of Type 1 Gaucher Disease. Drugs Future. 2010;35(8):613-20.
- Shayman JA, Kelly R, Kollmeyer J, He Y, and Abe A. Group XV phospholipase A(2), a lysosomal phospholipase A(2). Prog Lipid Res. 2011;50(1):1-13.
- Glukhova A, Hinkovska-Galcheva V, Kelly R, Abe A, Shayman JA, and Tesmer JJ. Structure and function of lysosomal phospholipase A2 and lecithin:cholesterol acyltransferase. Nat Commun. 2015;6:6250.
- Hinkovska-Galcheva V, Treadwell T, Shillingford JM, Lee A, Abe A, Tesmer JJG, et al. Inhibition of lysosomal phospholipase A2 predicts drug-induced phospholipidosis. J Lipid Res. 2021;62:100089.
- Wilson MW, Shu L, Hinkovska-Galcheva V, Jin Y, Rajeswaran W, Abe A, et al. Optimization of Eliglustat-Based Glucosylceramide Synthase Inhibitors as Substrate Reduction Therapy for Gaucher Disease Type 3. ACS Chem Neurosci. 2020;11(20):3464-73.
