= DJ Yonny =

American DJ

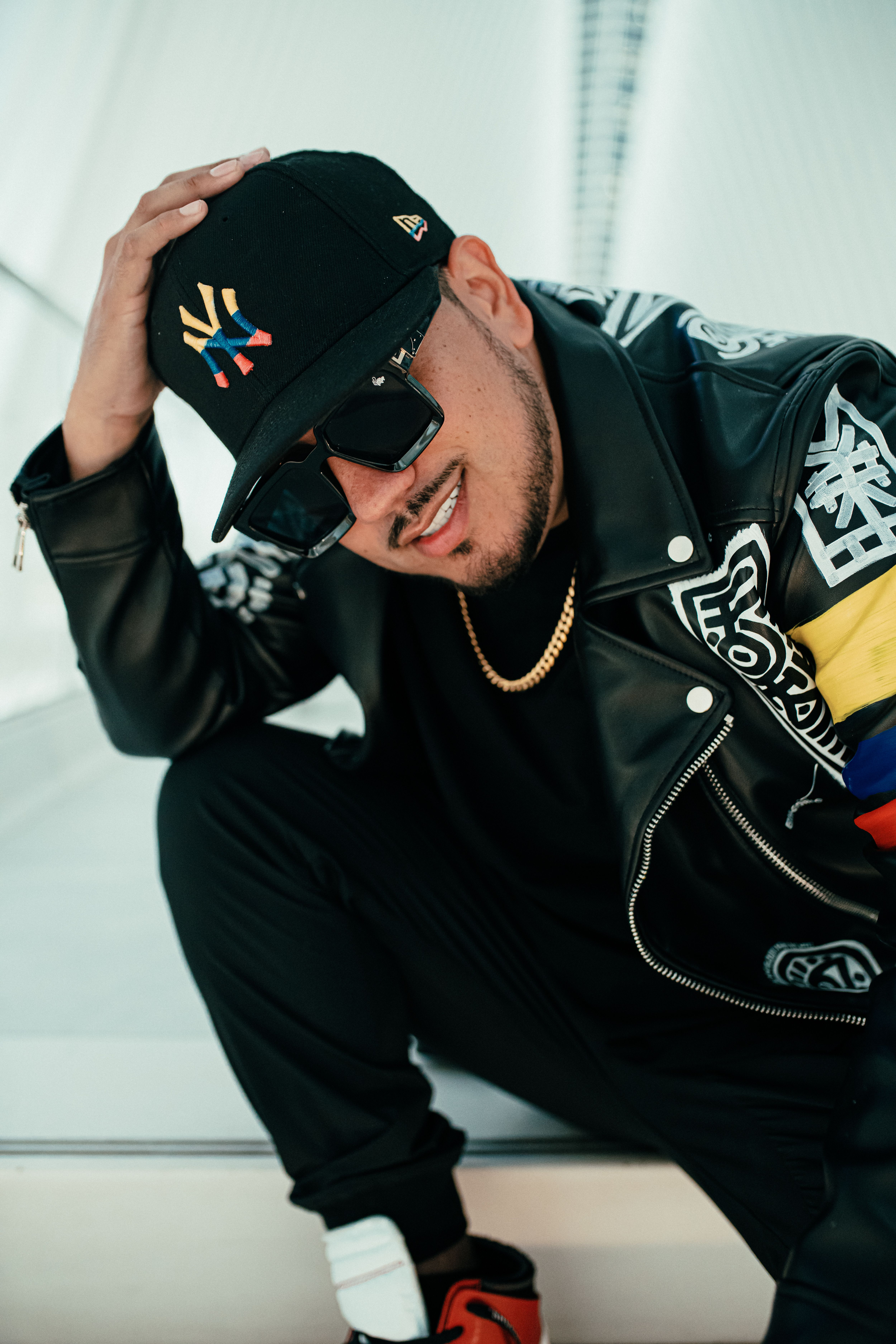

Background information
- Also known as: Breakfast N Vegas
- Born: Jonathan Avila; Queens, New York, United States
- Origin: New York City
- Genres: Electronic, House, Afro House, Turntablism, Latin, Afrobeats, Hip hop, reggaeton,
- Occupations: Disc jockey, Producer, Remixer
- Instruments: Turntable, Sampler
- Years active: 2005–present
- Website: www.djyonny.com

DJ Yonny (born Jonathan Ávila; May 17) is an American DJ, producer and remixer. Known for his time on New York City's radio station WBMP and on Philadelphia's radio station WRDW-FM. He is also a member of The Heavy Hitters DJs.

== Early life ==
Jonathan Ávila was born in Queens, New York to Colombian parents. He graduated from the Institute of Audio Research in March 2005.

== Career ==
=== Radio ===
Yonny's big break on the radio came when he became the associate producer for WWPR's morning show called "The Star & Buc Wild Show". He also spun on his own mixshow on WWPR called "The List" on Saturdays. Yonny later became a production engineer for Univision Radio. In February 2008, “The Star and Buc Wild Morning Show" moved to Pulse 87, where Yonny became the executive producer. After the show ended, Yonny moved on to his own mixshows on Pulse 87 called “Friday Night Fix" and on A-List Radio called "Mixmaster Hour +1".

He spun for a hip hop show on Eminem's radio station, Shade 45 on Sirius Satellite Radio. In 2009, DJ Yonny joined NYC's WNOW (92.3 AMP Radio) as a part of the "Weekend Roll Out", "Friday Night Mixtape" and "Saturday Night Dance Factory" mixers. Yonny moved on to his own mixshow as well called “Free Lunch Mix Fix".

In 2011, DJ Yonny joined Philadelphia's WRDW-FM and was given his own shows called "10 O'clock Party Rock Mix" and "The Friday Night Party Rock".

On April 13, 2012, Yonny guest deejayed DJ Felli Fel's "Jump Off Mix" for Los Angeles' radio station KPWR.

In 2013, he spun for radio stations, KFRH, KREV and KRCK-FM.

In 2014, he spun for Utah based radio station, KUUU.

=== Production ===
He has produced "You Ain't Got It (Funk That)" along with two other songs from Nina Sky's EP, The Other Side.

=== Television ===
In November 2011, he was cast as one of the eleven contestants for the second season of BET's DJ reality show, Master of the Mix. Despite making it to the finals with DJ P and DJ M-Squared, he lost to a "viewer vote" and became the 1st runner-up.

== Discography ==
=== Mixtapes ===
- This Is My House (2009)
- This Is Still My House (2011)
- Cornerstone Mixtape, Vol. 165: Hip-Electronica – A Journey Through Hip-Hop & EDM (2013)

=== Remixography ===
- Adele - "Set Fire to the Rain"
- Afrojack - "Can't Stop Me"
- Alex Clare - "Too Close"
- Avicii - "Fade into Darkness"
- The Black Eyed Peas - "Boom Boom Pow"
- Bell Biv DeVoe - "Poison"
- Bobby Shmurda - "Hot Nigga"
- Candi Lynn - "Lunatics"
- Carly Rae Jepsen - "Call Me Maybe"
- Chris Brown - "Look at Me Now"
- Chris Brown - "Loyal"
- Crystal Waters - "Gypsy Woman (She's Homeless)"
- Daddy Yankee - "Summertime"
- Daft Punk - "Get Lucky"
- David Guetta - "Titanium"
- Diplo & Alvaro - "6th Gear"
- Enrique Iglesias - "Tonight (I'm Fuckin' You)"
- Estelle - "Freak"
- Eva Simons - "I Don't Like You"
- Gia Bella - "Jump"
- Gotye - "Somebody That I Used to Know"
- J Rice - "Afraid of Love"
- Jamie Foxx - "Blame It"
- Jay Sean - "Down"
- Jeremih - "Birthday Sex"
- Jeremih - "Don't Tell 'Em"
- Juicy J - "Bandz A Make Her Dance"
- Jungle Brothers - "I'll House You"
- Kesha - "Tik Tok"
- Lady Gaga - "Bad Romance"
- Lana Del Rey - "Summertime Sadness"
- Lil Wayne - "Lollipop"
- LMFAO - "La La La"
- Madcon - "Beggin'"
- Major Lazer - "Watch Out For This (Bumaye)"
- Mavado - "So Special"
- Nicki Minaj - "Truffle Butter"
- Nina Sky - "Day Dreaming"
- Nina Sky - "On Some Bullshit"
- Omi - "Cheerleader"
- Pitbull - "Watagatapitusberry"
- Rihanna - "Only Girl (In the World)"
- Sister Nancy - "Bam Bam"
- Sito Rocks - "Ella Quiere"
- T.I. - "No Mediocre"
- Taio Cruz - "Dynamite"
- Travie McCoy - "Billionaire"
- Trey Songz - "Touchin, Lovin"
- Usher - "DJ Got Us Fallin' in Love"
- Usher - "Love in This Club"
- Usher - "OMG"
- Wale - "Bad"

=== Production ===
==== 2010 ====
Nina Sky - The Other Side

- 01. "The Other Side"
- 02. "You Ain't Got It (Funk That)"
- 06. "Never Look Back"
- 08. "You Ain't Got It (Funk That) (Remix)"

== Awards ==
Year	Group	Award	Album/Mixtape	Result
2010	Latin Mixx Award	Best House DJ	This Is My House	Won
2011	Latin Mixx Award	Mixtape of the Year	This Is Still My House	Won
