= Black Chiney =

Jamaican DJ group

- Origin: Jamaica; (United States) Miami, Florida, U.S.
- Genres: Dancehall; Miami bass
- Occupations: Sound system; selectors; producers
- Years active: 1999–present
- Label: Black Chiney
- Members: Supa Dups; Bobby Chin; Willy Chin; Walshy Fire
- Website: BlackChineySound.com

Black Chiney is a Jamaican sound system based in Miami, Florida. It consists of four Chinese Jamaicans: Supa Dups, Bobby Chin, Willy Chin and Walshy Fire. The Caribbean slang "Black Chiney" refers to this racial mix.

Black Chiney works as a sound system for nightclubs, concerts and other party venues. The quartet also participates in sound clashes in Jamaica.

== History ==
Before Black Chiney came to prominence, founding member Supa Dups (born Dwayne Chin-Quee) was a DJ at Miami's Power 96 radio station (WPOW 96.5) for two years, in his early teens. As Supa got older, he became interested in music production. His aunt thought that he was serious about becoming a producer, so she mortgaged her house in Miami and bought him an Akai MPC3000. Supa soon began mixing dancehall riddims with hip hop (mainly Miami bass).

Bobby Chin (born Robert Lee) was a selector in Kingston, Jamaica before he migrated to the U.S. at age 21. He settled in Washington, D.C., and was a selector for Earthquake sound system. After a successful stint as one of the top selectors in DC, Chin moved to Florida and joined Tampa-based Poison Dart sound system, joining Supa Dups. Poison Dart travelled extensively throughout North America and the Caribbean.

Supa and Chin left Poison Dart and began collaborating. They produced many dancehall/hip-hop mixtapes. In 1999, Supa Dups released the first mix CD entitled Black Chiney 1 - Enter The Dragon. This was their first nickname. The mixtape gained attention in the Caribbean. When Miami's DJ Khaled (WEDR 99.1) heard their mixtapes, he asked them to produce more. By the time a fifth volume mixtape was released by Supa Dups, Black Chiney was still known as a mix CD, and the mixtapes proved to be popular.

In early 2001, the pair went public as Black Chiney. Black Chiney gained recognition in Jamaica as a result of the mixtapes, but in the summer of 2001, they participated in sound clashes in Jamaica. Chin was the deejay who battled his opponents on stage, while Supa played a riddim as the selector. In 2002, at an annual event in Jamaica dubbed Fully Loaded, the reigning "king" Tony Matterhorn lost the clash against Black Chiney. In a rematch later that year in Miami, Matterhorn was again defeated by Black Chiney.

Touring dealt Black Chiney some burnout. Supa and Chin recruited two others to help them carry the load in 2003; Willy Chin and Walshy Killa. Willy Chin (born Warren Hoo) is the younger cousin of Supa Dups, and had about three years of experience as a selector. Walshy Fire (born Leighton Walsh) was mostly known as the younger brother of Courtney Walsh. Walshy Fire was born in Miami and raised in Jamaica. As a youth, he traveled extensively, which gave him an appreciation for other cultures. Walshy was formerly a selector based in Brooklyn, New York, and selects for both Major Lazer and Black Chiney.

In 2004, Supa Dups produced the first riddim under Black Chiney Records. It was called Kopa, and was widely used by artists including Elephant Man, Vybz Kartel, Capleton, Nina Sky and Akon recorded on the riddim. Some of these versions became hit singles. The Kopa riddim was played in clubs through 2005, and in 2006, Black Chiney released Higher Octane. The final riddim by Black Chiney is the Drumline/Timeline, released in 2007.

At 2007's Fully Loaded, Black Chiney spent their entire set insulting event organizer Sharon Burke, who had not paid them for their 2002 appearance. When Burke cut the group's set short, the crowd became unhappy and had to be placated by Tony Matterhorn before the show could continue.

Black Chiney continued to tour the world. Supa Dups became a Grammy Award-winning producer for his work with Eminem, and was nominated for another Grammy with Bruno Mars. Supa Dups has also worked for Sean Paul, Rihanna, Snoop Lion, Mary J Blige, Drake, Tyga, and Estelle.

== Discography ==
=== Riddims ===
- Kopa Riddim (2005)
- Higher Octane Riddim (2006)
- Drumline/Timeline Riddim (2007)
- Doctor Bird Riddim (2008)
