= Play That Song (Tony Touch song) =

Single by Tony Touch featuring Nina Sky and B-Real

from the album The ReggaeTony Album and the mixtape La Conexión
- Released: September 25, 2005
- Recorded: 2004–2005
- Genre: Reggaeton; hip hop
- Length: 3:18
- Label: EMI
- Songwriters: Natalie Albino, Nicole Albino, Vladimir Felix, Louis Freese, Stephen Hague, Joseph Hernandez, Malcolm McLaren, Ronald Larkins, Robert Andrews, Tyrone Price
- Producers: DJ Sonic, DJ Blass

Tony Touch singles chronology
"Ay Ay Ay" (2004)	"Play That Song" (2005)	"Saca La Semilla" (2005)

Nina Sky singles chronology
"Turnin' Me On" (2004)	"Play That Song" (2005)	"Ladies Night" (2005)

"Play That Song" is a song by Puerto Rican-American rapper and record producer Tony Touch from his debut Spanish-language reggaetón album and third overall studio album The ReggaeTony Album (2005). It features guest vocals from Puerto Rican-American female duo Nina Sky and American rapper B-Real. The track was written by Natalie Albino, Nicole Albino, Vladimir Felix, Louis Freeze, Stephen Hague, Joseph Hernandez, Malcolm McLaren, Ronald Larkins, Robert Andrews and Tyrone Price. It was released digitally on September 25, 2005, as the lead single from the album, preceding "Saca La Semilla" with Ivy Queen and Gran Omar.

The song, however, was already "bubbling up the charts" prior to its official release. It was also later included on Nina Sky's second mixtape La Conexion (2005) among other albums. It reached the Top 15 on the Billboard Bubbling Under Hot 100 chart, peaking at number 13 and Top 25 on the Billboard Bubbling Under Hot R&B/Hip-Hop Songs reaching number 22. It also managed to peak at number 31 on the Billboard Hot Latin Songs chart, peaking at number seven and number five on the Billboard Latin Tropical Airplay and Billboard Latin Rhythm Airplay charts respectively.

== Background ==
Following the commercial failure of Tony Touch's second studio album The Piece Maker 2 (2004), which was a sequel to his critically acclaimed debut studio album, Touch decided to move away from his style of New York Hip Hop music, only to combine it with Latin reggaetón on his next release The ReggaeTony Album in 2005.

In the Latin market, the album was success reaching number 11 on the Billboard Top Latin Albums chart as well as number 67 on the Billboard Top R&B/Hip-Hop Albums, failing to debut onto the Billboard 200. It was eventually certified Platinum by the Recording Industry Association of America (RIAA).

== Composition ==
Tony Touch "Play That Song" (2005)
A 21-second sample of the lead single "Play That Song".

"Play That Song" was written by Natalie Albino, Nicole Albino, Vladimir Felix, Louis Freeze, Stephen Hague, Joseph Hernandez, Malcolm McLaren, Ronald Larkins, Robert Andrews and Tyrone Price. It is a mixture of reggaetón and hip hop music. The song features guest vocals by Nina Sky and B Real of Cypress Hill.

DJ Blass and DJ Sonik handled production of the song while audio production was handled by him along with DJ Premier, who also mixed, KYZE, Major League, Psycho Les, SPK, and Luis "Sabor" Tineo. John Anderson and Luis Tineo also served as engineer. Tony Touch also received co-producing, mixing and DJing credits.

== Release and chart performance ==
The song was released digitally on September 25, 2005, by EMI. Following its release as a single, it has been included on various albums including Nina Sky's second studio album La Conexion (2005), the compilation album Reggaetón Most Wanted, Vol. 1 (2006), 2007 Años De Exitos (2006), a mixtape entitled Heavy Rotation: All Star Mixtape, Vol. 3 (2006), hosted by Jadakiss and Sheek Louch, Reggaetón! (2012), and the karaoke albums Sing Reggaetón, Vol. 2 (2013) and Hits from 2005, Vol. 15 (2013).

On the Billboard Bubbling Under Hot 100 chart, "Play That Song" peaked at number 13. On the Billboard Bubbling Under Hot R&B/Hip-Hop Songs chart, it peaked at number 22. On the Billboard Latin Songs chart, the song peaked at number 31 giving Touch his Latin Songs chart debut. On the Billboard Latin Tropical Airplay chart, the song peaked at number seven. It also managed to reach number five on the Billboard Latin Rhythm Airplay chart. This made Nina Sky two of only a few female artists who have been able to reach the Top 10 of the Latin Rhythm Airplay chart along with Ivy Queen, who currently has seven top-ten, two of them number-one singles, Latin pop singers Shakira and RBD, and American R&B singers Beyoncé Knowles, Cassie, and Keyshia Cole.

== Track listing ==
- Digital download
1. "Play That Song" (Album Version) — 3:18
2. "Play That Song" (Remix by DJ Sonik) — 3:44
- Vinyl
1. "Play That Song" (Remix Clean Version) — 3:44
2. "Gangsta Gangsta" (Clean Version) — 3:37
3. "Play That Song" (Clean Album Version) — 3:18
4. "Play That Song" (Remix Dirty Version) — 3:44
5. "Gangsta Gangsta" (Dirty Version) — 3:37
6. "Play That Song" (Dirty Album Version) — 3:18

== Charts ==
Chart (2005)	Position
US Bubbling Under Hot 100 (Billboard)	13
US Bubbling Under Hot R&B/Hip-Hop Songs (Billboard)	22
US Latin Songs (Billboard)	31
US Latin Tropical Airplay (Billboard)	7
US Latin Rhythm Airplay (Billboard)	5
