= Nicole and Natalie =

Studio album by Nina Sky
- Released: July 31, 2012
- Recorded: 2011–2012
- Genre: Dance; dubstep; R&B
- Length: 30:33
- Label: Independent
- Producer: Nicole Albino; Natalie Albino; The Smeezingtons; Beau Vallis; Brenmar; Slimmy Neutron; Salaam Remi

Nina Sky chronology
The Other Side (2010)	Nicole and Natalie (2012)	Brightest Gold (2016)

Singles from Nicole and Natalie
- 1. "Day Dreaming" Released: February 2, 2012; 2. "Heartbeat" Released: June 14, 2012; 3. "Comatose" Released: October 24, 2012

Nicole and Natalie is the second studio album by the New York City-based duo Nina Sky. It was released on July 31, 2012. Three singles were released from the album: "Day Dreaming", "Heartbeat" and "Comatose". It was the duo's second independent, and reviewers noted that the lack of record company pressures allowed the duo to experiment on this album. This includes the addition of dubstep to their sound, and the unique double harmonies created by sisters twin Nicole and Natalie Albino. The sisters also served as producers for the first time.

== Track listing ==
No.	Title	Producer(s)	Length
1.	"Starting Today"	The Smeezingtons	3:38
2.	"Day Dreaming"	Beau Vallis	3:20
3.	"Heartbeat"	Nicole Albino, Slimmy Neutron	4:22
4.	"Comatose"	Brenmar	3:51
5.	"Never Kissed You"	Salaam Remi	4:54
6.	"Everytime" (featuring Lee Wilkie)	Nicole Albino, Slimmy Neutron	3:43
7.	"Bright Lights"	Slimmy Neutron	3:37
8.	"Makeover"	Nicole Albino, Slimmy Neutron	3:08

== Release history ==
Country	Date	Format	Label
United States	July 27, 2012	Limited CD copies	Self-released
Worldwide	July 31, 2012	Digital download	Self-released
