= Nina Sky =

American musical duo

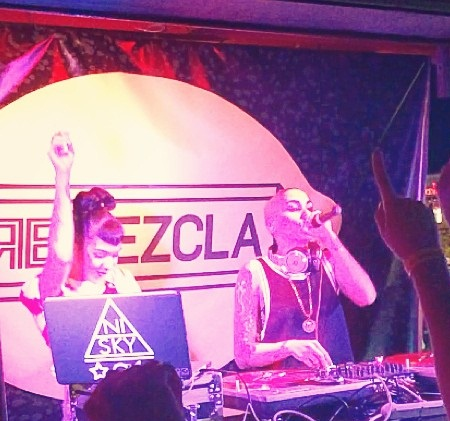
- Nina Sky performing in 2014

Background information
- Origin: Queens, New York City, U.S.
- Genres: Pop; R&B
- Works: Discography
- Years active: 2003–present
- Labels: Universal; Next Plateau; La Conexión; Traffic; Polo Grounds; J; Sony (former); Tommy Boy; WEA (current)
- Members: Nicole Albino; Natalie Albino

External audio
- Listen to Nina Sky's "Move Ya Body" here
- Listen to Nina Sky's "Play That Song" here

Nina Sky is an American musical duo, consisting of identical twins Nicole and Natalie Albino. Their debut single "Move Ya Body", released from their self-titled debut album in 2004, was a success, reaching number four on the Billboard Hot 100. Their most recent album, Nicole and Natalie, was released in July 2012.

== Early and personal lives ==
The Albino sisters were born on March 13, 1986 in Puerto Rico, with Natalie being the older twin. Their parents later moved to New York City and divorced when the girls were young. The sisters grew up in Astoria, Queens in the Marine Terrace area. As a result of their stepfather working as a DJ, the twins were influenced by different types of music at an early age. By the age of 7, the twins had already written their first song, titled "Sisters". By 10, they knew that they wanted to become singers. When they were 13, they learned how to DJ and two years later were playing concerts in many clubs. Nicole is a lesbian and is married to fashion designer Erin Magee.

== History ==
=== Name origin ===
The sisters wanted to devise a band name of their own, so they used the first two syllables of their names ("Ni" and "Na"), to come up with Nina. They then added Sky, which for them represented "independent twins".

=== 2003–2006: Nina Sky and mixtapes ===
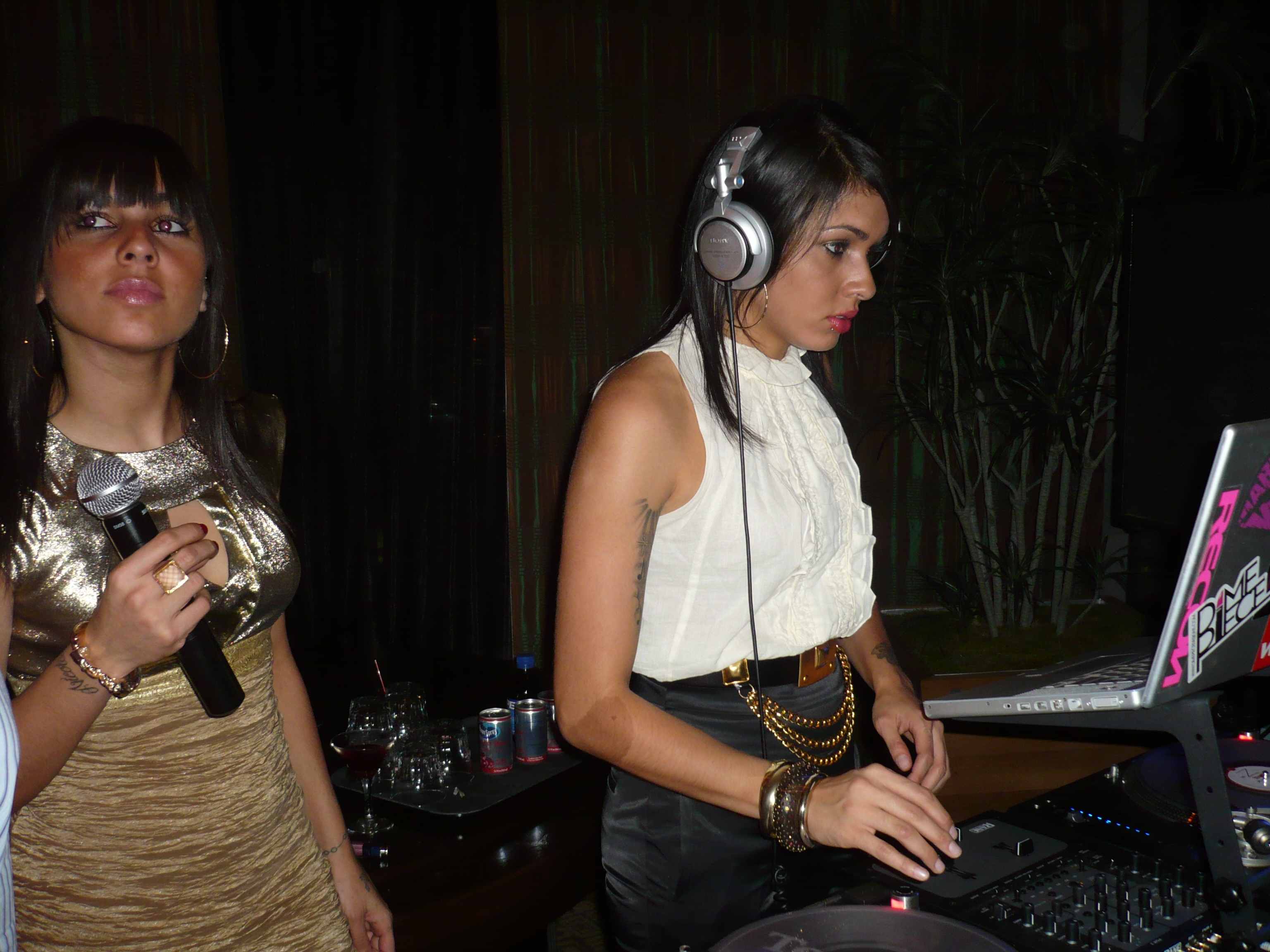
Natalie (left) and Nicole performing in 2007

In 2003, The Jettsonz (Elijah Wells & Lionel Bermingham) introduced the girls to Cipha Sounds, a hip hop DJ under the Star Trak label owned by the Neptunes (Pharrell and Chad Hugo). Cipha Sounds was impressed when he heard the duo sing and suggested that they use the "Coolie Dance" riddim. The duo then proceeded to write "Move Ya Body" (alongside the Jettsonz Elijah Wells & Lionel Bermingham, who also produced the record), mixing Caribbean, R&B, and pop rhythms. Eventually, a demo of the song was made. The demo fell into the hands of Eddie O'Loughlin, the president of Next Plateau Entertainment (which is a division of Universal Records). O'Loughlin signed the twins to a contract and they started working on their debut album. On March 18, 2004, they had their first concert under their current name at Club Demara.

The single "Move Ya Body" was released on April 27, 2004 and reached number four on the Billboard Hot 100, and number 22 on the Billboard Year-End chart. Urban music and rhythmic top 40 stations quickly added the song to their play lists, sending the song up the charts. On June 22, 2004 they released their first self-titled album, featuring Jabba and Betty Wright. The album charted at #44 on the US Billboard 200 and number four on the U.S. R&B chart. Another single from the album, titled "Turnin' Me On," was released on November 30, 2004. It did not achieve the same success as "Move Ya Body", but charted at #5 on Billboard's Bubbling Under Hot 100 chart and was a minor success in France.

Nina Sky continued to work and promote their music. They have contributed to the reggaeton movement with songs such as "Oye Mi Canto", and "Más Maíz" with artist and producer N.O.R.E. They were also a featured artist on Sean Paul's song "Connection" from his album The Trinity.

On October 25, 2005, they released their second mixtape called La Conexión, influenced by Latin music. The album contained the single "Ladies Night" (released April 17, 2006 and featuring Ivy Queen), released with the songs "Loving You" and "Your Time". It also contained Kassanova's remix of their single "Turnin' Me On". The album features artists such as Pitbull, N.O.R.E., Notch, Richie Rivera, Mackie, and Yaga. It also includes Tony Touch's hit "Play That Song", featuring Nina Sky and B-Real, released one month before the mixtape's release. In August 2006, Nina Sky were first featured on the cover of the publication The FADER, in its 39th issue. In 2006, their third mixtape 80's Babies was released.

=== 2007–2011: Label issues, marriages and The Other Side ===
Nina Sky collaborated with French singer Kenza Farah for the song "Celle Qu'Il Te Faut", and was released in both French and English versions. The video was shot in New York. Nina Sky recorded their second studio album, Starting Today. The album was originally due on July 27, 2007. Producers include Stereotypes, Bruno & Phil, Neo da Matrix, Ryan Leslie, Salaam Remi, and more. Guests include Rick Ross and others that have yet to be announced. In late 2007, Nina Sky left their label, Universal, and signed with Polo Grounds Music/J Records.

Nina Sky have also put together remixes of popular songs including J. Holiday's "Bed", Elliott Yamin's "Wait for You", Cassidy's "My Drink n My 2 Step", and The-Dream's "I Love Your Girl". They have also worked with Brooklyn MC Red Cafe on his street album The Co-Op, and The Alchemist on his song "Key to the City". In 2008, Nina Sky released two singles, from Starting Today: "Curtain Call" (featuring Rick Ross) and "On Some Bulls**t"; both were not a big success. On December 19, 2008, Nina Sky released their first holiday album, an EP titled Christmas.

Nina Sky appeared on Major Lazer's album, Guns Don't Kill People... Lazers Do. They were in a battle with their record company Polo Grounds over the release of their album Starting Today. They said they wanted to be released from their contract with the label due to the label not supporting them. In 2010, Nicole Albino revealed she is lesbian and married female fashion designer, Erin Magee. The couple had been dating since 2009. In an interview with Inked Magazine, Magee revealed that she had her last name legally changed to Nicole's and had gotten a tattoo of the name across her right breast. With a new masculine style, the duo independently released an eight-song EP for digital download in August 2010, entitled The Other Side, which features production from DJ Yonny, Salaam Remi, Kidz in the Hall and many more. A video for the lead single, "You Ain't Got It (Funk That)" was also released. In early 2011, they worked with Creep on their song "You". On May 16, they released the music video on their official website.

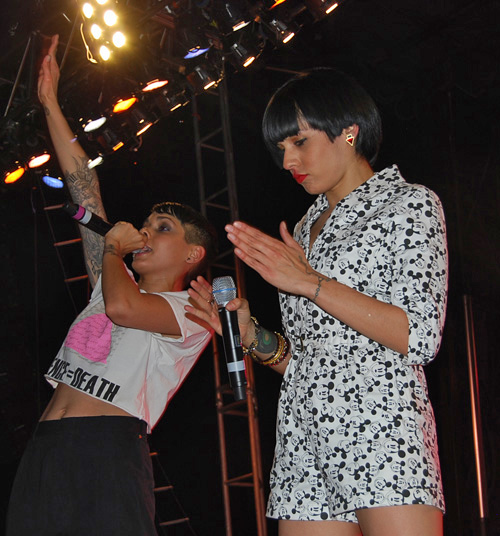
Nina Sky performing live at Phoenix Pride Festival in April 2010

=== 2012–present: Nicole and Natalie, motherhood, and new label contract ===
On February 2, 2012, Nina Sky released the lead single from their upcoming third studio album, Nicole and Natalie. The single, entitled "Day Dreaming", was produced by Beau Vallis. The video for the song, directed by Adam Sauermilch, was released on February 28. On June 14, the band released "Heartbeat", the second single from the new album. A month later, on July 27, the video for "Heartbeat" was released. Concerning the video, the band stated: "We knew we wanted it to be more about the feeling of the song and less about the story. The colors, environment, and everyone dancing in their own element creates this surreal feeling of freedom. It’s just about listening to the rhythm inside you and letting that rhythm guide you." On July 31, the album was released. Songs on the album contain electro, house, pop and R&B elements. The album failed to chart because of its independent release. On October 14, 2012, Nina Sky released third and final single from the album, "Comatose". In 2012, they finally signed out from the label Polo Grounds/J Records.

On June 9, 2012, Nina Sky performed at OUT/LOUD Queer Women's Music Festival in Eugene, Oregon along with artists such as Krudas Cubensi, Tender Forever and Andrea Gibson. Later, on November 15, Nina Sky hosted Women in Business' fourth annual "Dress for Success" fashion show at Baruch College. On March 11, 2013, group released their sixth mixtape, titled Valentine's Day, hosted by Miss KL. On December 12, group released their new promotional single titled "Overtime" for digital download. The song was produced by Slimmy Neutron, who produced their album Nicole and Natalie, released in 2012.

On March 9, 2014, Natalie Albino gave birth to her son, Max. In the same month, Nicole released her first solo project, a mixtape album titled Currently Vol. 1 which contains her remixes of many popular songs by singers such as Madonna, Beyoncé, R. Kelly, Mariah Carey, etc. On April 17, they announced a new single via their official Facebook site. One day later, their new song "Stoners", featuring Smoke DZA was released; this had better success than the previous one, released in 2013. The official music video for the single was released on July 25, via their official profiles. The extended remix for the song, made by Trayze, was also released. After the music video was released, they announced more new music and new projects coming in 2015. On October 22, 2014, Nina Sky featured on Lady Bee's single "Do It All Again" from the album What Is a Jeffree? together with a music video. After finishing their European Tour in May 2015, on June 2, their Vito Fun and Spaceplant-produced electropop single titled "Forever" was released. "We wanted something that was smooth but also had a bounce," Nina Sky told The FADER in an email. "Spaceplant finessed the verses with a modern '90s freestyle beat pattern and built up the hook just enough that the song still has its original sweet vibe but if you drop it at the right time in a club, it will still go off!" the twins added. A new album title Brightest Gold was announced in 2015, but was never released. In 2016, the twins signed a recording contract with Warner Music Group's independent recording label Tommy Boy Entertainment.

== Tours ==
- 15th Anniversary Tour (2019)

Date	City	Country	Venue
May 1	New York City	United States	Mercury Lounge
May 2	Philadelphia	United States	Kung Fu Neck Tie
May 4	Washington D.C.	United States	Songbyrd
May 6	Boston	United States	Middle East
May 13	Phoenix	United States	Valley Bar
May 17	Los Angeles	United States	NOVO
May 18	San Diego	United States	The Merrow

== Discography ==
- Nina Sky (2004)
- Nicole and Natalie (2012)

== See also ==
- List of Puerto Ricans
- List of twins
