= Sagat (rapper) =

American rapper

- Also known as: Blaksam, Jump Chico Slamm
- Origin: Baltimore, Maryland
- Genres: House, Club
- Occupations: Rapper, record producer
- Years active: 1993–present
- Label: Maxi Records

Sagat is an American rapper. He also works as a producer under the alias Jump Chico Slamm (or Jump "Chico" Slamm).

He had a major hit in 1994 with "Why Is It? (Funk Dat)". He then produced a follow-up single, "Luvstuff". These songs charted at Christmas time on the UK Singles Chart in 1993 and 1994. "Luvstuff" gained support from DJs such as Pete Tong, Jon Carter and Judge Jules.

In 1994, he released his album, My Poem Is... The World According To Sagat, containing his hits "Why Is It? (Funk Dat)" and "Luvstuff". It was released on the New York house label Maxi Records. He recorded one record, Mr. Phat, under the alias Blaksam.
