= Dead Prez discography =

dead prez discography
- Studio albums: 3
- Live albums: 1
- Singles: 9
- Mixtapes: 4
- Collaborative mixtapes: 1

This is the discography of American hip hop duo dead prez.

== Albums ==
=== Studio albums ===
List of albums, with selected chart positions, sales figures and certifications
Title	Album details	Peak chart positions				Sales
Title	Album details	US	US R&B/HH	US Indie	UK R&B	Sales
Let's Get Free	Released: February 8, 2000; Label: Loud Records	73	22	4	20	US: 300,000
RBG: Revolutionary but Gangsta	Released: March 30, 2004; Label: Columbia Records	60	14	—	40	US: 21,000
Information Age	Released: October 16, 2012; Label: Krian Music Group	—	—	—	—	
"—" denotes a recording that did not chart or was not released in that territory.						

=== Mixtapes ===
List of mixtapes, with selected chart positions
Title	Album details	Peak chart positions		
Title	Album details	US	US R&B/HH	US Indie
Turn Off the Radio: The Mixtape Vol. 1 (as DPZ)	Released: November 19, 2002; Label: Full Clip Records	—	78	30
Get Free or Die Tryin' (Turn Off the Radio: The Mixtape Vol. 2)	Released: October 21, 2003; Label: Landspeed Records	144	32	10
Pulse of the People (Turn Off the Radio: The Mixtape Vol. 3) (hosted by DJ Green Lantern)	Released: June 24, 2009; Label: Invasion Music Group	—	81	—
Turn Off the Radio Vol. 4: Revolutionary but Gangsta Grillz (hosted by DJ Drama)	Released: June 22, 2010; Label: Boss Up Inc.	—	—	—

=== Collaborative mixtapes ===
List of collaborative mixtapes, with selected chart positions
Title	Album details	Peak chart positions	
Title	Album details	US	US R&B/HH
Can't Sell Dope Forever (with Outlawz)	Released: 2006; Label: Affluent Records	—	99

=== Live albums ===
List of live albums, with selected chart positions
Title	Album details
Live in San Francisco	Released: February 5, 2008; Label: 2B1 Multimedia

== M-1 solo albums ==
Year	Title	Chart positions	
Year	Title	US	US R&B
2006	Confidential: Released: March 21, 2006; Label: Sotti / Koch Records; Format: CD, Digital download	—	52

== stic.man solo albums ==
Year	Title	Chart positions	
Year	Title	US	US R&B
2007	Manhood: Released: October 23, 2007; Label: Boss Up Inc. / Traffic; Format: CD, Digital download	—	—
2011	The Workout: Released: April 12, 2011; Label: Boss Up Inc.; Format: CD, Digital download	—	—
2020	Workout II: Released: February 28, 2020; Label: Boss Up Inc. / RBG Fit Club; Format: CD, Digital download	—	—

=== Collaborative albums ===
Year	Title	Chart positions	
Year	Title	US	US R&B
2006	Soldier 2 Soldier (stic.man and Young Noble): Released: October 3, 2006; Label: Real Talk Entertainment; Format: CD, Digital download	—	—
2011	AP2P - All Power To The People (M-1 and Bonnot): Released: December 5, 2011; Label: Bonnot Music; Format: CD, Digital download	—	—
2013	Evolutionary Minded (Furthering the Legacy of Gil Scott-Heron) (M-1, Kentyah, Brian Jackson & The New Midnight Band): Released: September 10, 2013; Label: Motema Music LLC; Format: CD, Digital download	—	—
2016	Between Me and the World (M-1 and Bonnot): Released: May 6, 2016; Label: Krian Music Group; Format: CD, Digital download	—	—
2025	Integrity (stic and Young Noble): Released: June, 2025; Label: Self-released; Format: Digital download	—	—

== Singles ==
Year	Title	Chart positions				Album
Year	Title	US Rap	FRA	UK	UK HH	Album
1998	"Sellin' D.O.P.E. (Drugs Oppress People Everyday)"	—	—	—	—	Slam: The Soundtrack
1999	"Hip-Hop"	49	198	41	8	Let's Get Free
1999	"They Schools"	—	—	—	—	Let's Get Free
1999	"Police State"	—	—	—	—	Let's Get Free
2000	"It's Bigger Than Hip Hop"	43	—	—	—	Let's Get Free
2004	"Radio Freq"	—	—	—	—	Revolutionary But Gangsta
2004	"Hell Yeah (Pimp the System)"	—	—	—	—	Revolutionary But Gangsta
2009	"Politrikkks"	—	—	—	—	Information Age

=== As featured artist ===
List of charted singles as featured, with selected chart positions, showing year released and album name
Title	Year	Peak chart positions		Album
Title	Year	US HH Sales	UK HH	Album
"Warzone" (Pete Rock featuring dead prez)	2004	37	26	Soul Survivor II
"—" denotes a recording that did not chart or was not released in that territory.

== Guest appearances ==
Year	Song	Artist	Album
1996	"Bluesanova- Brown Towne Mix"	Tom Browne	—
1997	"The Game of Life (Score)"	—	Soul in the Hole
1997	"Footsteps"	Billy Lawrence	Paradise
1998	"The Rain & the Sun"	Big Pun	Capital Punishment
1999	"Look Around"	The Beatnuts, Cheryl Pepsii Riley	A Musical Massacre
2000	"Dem Crazy"	Stephen Marley	Music from and Inspired by the Motion Picture Black and White
2000	"Hip-Hop"	Static-X	Loud Rocks
2000	"Sharp Shooters"	Reflection Eternal	Lyricist Lounge 2
2000	"U R Ripping Us Apart"	Tupac Shakur	The Rose That Grew from Concrete
2001	"Get Up"	The Coup	Party Music
2002	"Shuffering and Shmiling"	Talib Kweli, Jorge Ben, Bilal	Red Hot + Riot: The Music and Spirit of Fela Kuti
2003	"The Grind"	Erykah Badu	Worldwide Underground
2003	"Tear Shit Up"	Paris	Sonic Jihad
2003	"Freedom"	Paris	Sonic Jihad
2004	"Touch 1-Touch All"	Tony Touch	The Piece Maker 2
2004	"Sucka Thank He Cud Wup Me"	The X-Ecutioners	Revolutions
2004	"Fight"	Ricanstruction	Love + Revolution
2005	"U Ain't the Only 1"	Messy Marv	Bandannas, Tattoos & Tongue Rings
2005	"Audobon Ballroom"	Black Market Militia	Black Market Militia
2005	"Warriorz Heart (Gangbang)"	Smif-N-Wessun	Smif 'n' Wessun: Reloaded
2005	"If I Fail"	2Pac	The Rose, Vol. 2
2005	"Ridin'"	David Banner, Talib Kweli	Certified
2006	"Can't Hold Us Back"	Public Enemy, Kam	Rebirth of a Nation
2006	"Hard Truth Soldiers"	Public Enemy, The Conscious Daughters, MC Ren	Rebirth of a Nation
2007	"Freedom Walk"	Lifesavas	Gutterfly
2007	"Locked and Loaded"	Z-Trip, Deftones	All Pro Soundtrack
2010	"Cry Freedom"	Steele	Amerikkka's Nightmare Part 2: Children of War
2010	"Let's Get Organized"	Bonnot	Intergalactic Arena
2011	"Angels & Demons"	Immortal Technique, Bazaar Royale	The Martyr
2012	"TNT"	¡Mayday!	Take Me to Your Leader
2012	"Soul Power"	Quakers	Quakers
2013	"Opponent"	Kentyah, Brian Jackson, The New Midnight Band	Evolutionary Minded
2016	"Babylon"	Stephen Marley, Junior Reid	Revelation Pt. 2 – The Fruit of Life
