= Get Free or Die Tryin' =

Turn Off the Radio The Mixtape Vol. 2: Get Free or Die Tryin'

Mixtape by dead prez
- Released: October 21, 2003
- Genre: Hip-hop
- Length: 40:35
- Label: Landspeed
- Producer: Aaron Harris; Black Jeruz; Burk; Chad Beat; M-1; Onyx; Sol Messiah; Stic.man; Tahir; Teak Underdue

Dead prez chronology
Turn Off the Radio: The Mixtape Vol. 1 (2002)	Turn Off the Radio The Mixtape Vol. 2: Get Free or Die Tryin' (2003)	Can't Sell Dope Forever (2006)

Singles from Turn Off the Radio The Mixtape Vol. 2: Get Free or Die Tryin'
- 1. "Fuck the Law" Released: 2003

Professional ratings
Review scores
Source	Rating
AllHipHop	3/5 stars
HipHopDX	4/5
Pitchfork	4.1/10
RapReviews	8/10
(The New) Rolling Stone Album Guide	3/5 stars
The Village Voice	(2-star Honorable Mention)

Turn Off the Radio The Mixtape Vol. 2: Get Free or Die Tryin' is the second mixtape by American hip-hop duo dead prez. It was released on October 21, 2003, via Landspeed Records. Production was handled by Aaron Harris, Black Jeruz, Burk, Chad Beat, M-1, Onyx, Sol Messiah, Stic.man, Tahir, and Teak Underdue. Beside dead prez, it features contributions from Jamila, N.I.M.R.O.D., Umi, Askari X, Burk, Divine, Mr. Bugman, Mr. Sonshine, Onyx, and the RBG Family. The album debuted at number 144 on the Billboard 200 and number 32 on the Top R&B/Hip-Hop Albums and number 10 on the Independent Albums charts in the United States.

== Track listing ==
No.	Title	Producer(s)	Length
1.	"Intro" (performed by Stic.man, Umi, Jamila and Mr. Sonshine)		1:38
2.	"Fuck the Law" (performed by Stic.man and the RBG Family)	Black Jeruz	1:58
3.	"Coming of Age" (performed by Stic.man and N.I.M.R.O.D.)	Teak Underdue	3:24
4.	"Tallahassee Days" (performed by Stic.man)	Aaron Harris	2:10
5.	"Paper, Paper" (performed by Mr. Bugman)	Tahir	1:23
6.	"Scared to Die" (performed by Askari X)		3:03
7.	"Baby Face" (performed by Divine)	Chad Beat	1:35
8.	"When Mama Cries" (performed by dead prez, Umi and Jamila)	Sol Messiah	3:14
9.	"Window to My Soul" (performed by Stic.man)	Stic.man	4:05
10.	"Last Days Reloaded" (performed by Onyx and dead prez)	Onyx	4:10
11.	"Hood News" (performed by M-1)	M-1	2:15
12.	"Real Black Girl (Revolutionary Love)" (performed by dead prez, Jamila and N.I.M.R.O.D.)	Chad Beat	3:11
13.	"Out in the World"	Tahir	3:51
14.	"O.G. (Original Garvey)" (performed by Stic.man)	Aaron Harris	1:48
15.	"Red, Black & Green" (performed by O.G. Gotti Valentine)		0:56
16.	"Afrika" (performed by Burk)	Burk	1:54
Total length:			40:35

== Charts ==
Chart (2003)	Peak position
US Billboard 200	144
US Top R&B/Hip-Hop Albums (Billboard)	32
US Independent Albums (Billboard)	10
