= Confidential (M-1 album) =

Studio album by M-1
- Released: March 21, 2006
- Studio: Sotti Studios (New York, NY)
- Genre: Hip hop
- Length: 55:12
- Label: Koch
- Producer: Agallah; Black Jeruz; Butter; Eric "Ibo" Butler; Fabrizio Sotti; LT Moe; Spoo Noodles; Tahir

dead prez chronology
RBG: Revolutionary but Gangsta (2004)	Confidential (2006)	Information Age (2012)

Professional ratings
Review scores
Source	Rating
AllHipHop	3/5 stars
HipHopDX	3/5
PopMatters	8/10
RapReviews	7.5/10
XXL	3/5 (L)

Confidential is the debut solo studio album by American rapper M-1. It was released on March 21, 2006, through Sotti/Koch Records as a DualDisc with a DVD side featuring a twenty-minute documentary on the making of the entire album in stereo sound. Production was handled by Fabrizio Sotti, Agallah, Black Jeruz, Butter, Eric "Ibo" Butler, LT Moe, Spoo Noodles and Tahir. It features guest appearances from Raye, Bang Double, Bazaar Royale, Cassandra Wilson, Ghostface Killah, K'naan, Q-Tip, Scrap Daddy, stic.man, Stori James, Styles P and Young Dre the Truth.

The album didn't reach the Billboard 200 chart, however, it peaked at No. 52 on the Top R&B/Hip-Hop Albums and No. 23 on the Independent Albums in the United States. It was supported with two promotional singles: "Early" b/w "Comrade's Call" and "'Til We Get There" b/w "The Beat", with the latter was voted into rotation on New York's Hot 97 and was also featured on the soundtrack for the 2006 video game NBA Live 07.

== Track listing ==
No.	Title	Producer(s)	Length
1.	"One Side (The Anthem)"	Fabrizio Sotti	2:55
2.	"Early" (featuring stic.man)	Fabrizio Sotti	3:25
3.	"Land, Bread & Housing" (featuring My Momma' and Raye)	Butter	3:16
4.	"For You" (featuring Scrap Daddy)	Black Jeruz	4:38
5.	"Confidential" (featuring Raye)	Fabrizio Sotti	4:10
6.	"Love You Can't Borrow" (featuring Q-Tip and Cassandra Wilson)	Fabrizio Sotti	3:52
7.	"5 Elements"	Spoo Noodles	3:02
8.	"Gunslinger"	Fabrizio Sotti	2:07
9.	"Comrade's Call" (featuring Styles P and Bazaar Royale)	Agallah	4:39
10.	"Don't Put Down Your Flag" (featuring Young Dre the Truth)	LT Moe	4:43
11.	"The Beat" (featuring Bang Double)	Tahir	3:20
12.	"Been Through" (featuring Ghostface Killah and Raye)	Fabrizio Sotti	3:47
13.	"'Til We Get There" (featuring K'naan and Stori James)	Fabrizio Sotti	4:24
14.	"Too Smart"	Eric "Ibo" Butler	6:54
Total length:			55:12

== Charts ==
Chart (2006)	Peak position
US Top R&B/Hip-Hop Albums (Billboard)	52
US Independent Albums (Billboard)	23
