= MoYah =

Mozambican-born rapper, poet, interfaith activist, and educator

- Born: Mario Barca
- Origin: Mozambique
- Genres: Afrofusion, Hip hop, Spoken word, Conscious rap
- Occupations: Rapper, poet, educator, interfaith curator, activist
- Years active: 2000s–present
- Label: Independent
- Formerly of: Blind Alphabetz, Geneva Konvention

MoYah (born Mario Barca) aka Mohammed Yahya is a Mozambican-born UK-based rapper, poet, educator, and interfaith activist. Born during Mozambique’s civil war, he fled with his family to Lisbon as a child before relocating to London. His music blends Afrofusion, hip hop, and spoken word, and is underpinned by a deep commitment to interfaith dialogue, community-building, and social activism.

== Early life ==
Mohammed Yahya was born in Mozambique during the country’s civil war. He and his family fled to Lisbon, Portugal, before moving to London.

As a teenager in London, he co-founded the hip hop groups Geneva Konvention and Blind Alphabetz; their debut project Luvolution was released in 2007.

== Career ==
=== Early projects ===
In 2008 Yahya released his first solo mixtape Beyond Conflict, which included collaborations with M1 of Dead Prez and Sean Price. The tape was praised in the UK underground hip hop scene for blending political consciousness with bilingual delivery (English and Portuguese).

He later worked with Native Sun (with Cuban vocalist Sarina Leah), and performed internationally in Africa, Europe, and the Middle East.

=== Festival da Canção / Eurovision involvement ===
In 2023, MoYah was selected by RTP to compete in Festival da Canção 2023, Portugal’s national selection for the Eurovision Song Contest 2023. He performed the bilingual Afro-fusion track "Too Much Sauce" in the first semi-final, finishing eighth overall (fourth in the second round), narrowly missing qualification for the final.

In an interview, MoYah described the song as a celebration of self-worth—“too much sauce” symbolising abundant style and inner light—and said he aimed to bring Afro-fusion to the Portuguese selection process.

=== Media features ===
MoYah’s music and activism have been featured on BBC One, RTP, and RTP Africa.

== Activism and interfaith work ==
MoYah co-created the UK’s first Muslim-Jewish hip hop event series, Rebel Muzik, and founded the Rebel Muzik Arts Foundation, a platform fostering interfaith exchange through music and art.

He performed for Refugee Week in the UK, an arts and culture festival celebrating refugee contributions, coordinated by Counterpoints Arts with partners including UNHCR, Amnesty International, and Oxfam.

MoYah was recognised with the 21 for 21 award as an emerging faith leader. He has also served as Hip Hop Ambassador for May Project Gardens and as Head of Social Impact for Acorda Music.

== Humanitarian work in Mozambique ==
MoYah has been involved in community development and education initiatives in Mozambique. Media reports have highlighted his participation in projects aimed at providing meals for school children in Pungue, in collaboration with local grassroots organisations.

== Discography ==
Year	Title	Type	Notes
2007	Luvolution	Mixtape (with Blind Alphabetz)	Group debut project
2008	Beyond Conflict	Solo mixtape	Features M1 (Dead Prez), Sean Price
2022	Praise	Single	—
2023	Too Much Sauce	Festival da Canção single	Bilingual track performed in Portugal’s Eurovision selection
2024	How Many (Palestine Dedication)	Single + video	—
2025	Tabonga (feat. Don Jaga)	Single	Collaboration with Don Jaga

- Further releases available on [MoYah’s Bandcamp page](https://moyah.bandcamp.com/music).*
