= The Piece Maker 2 =

Studio album by Tony Touch
- Released: February 24, 2004
- Recorded: 2003–2004
- Genre: Hip-hop
- Length: 56:11
- Label: Touch; Koch
- Producer: Domingo; Erick Sermon; Joey Blitz; Juju; Pete Rock; Psycho Les; Q-Unique; Ray Roll; RZA; Sean C; Tony Touch

Tony Touch chronology
The Last of the Pro Ricans (2002)	The Piece Maker 2 (2004)	The ReggaeTony Album (2005)

Singles from The Piece Maker 2
- 1. "Capicu" Released: 2002; 2. "We See Yall" Released: 2003; 3. "Dimelo" Released: 2004; 4. "Non-Stop" Released: 2004; 5. "Ay, Ay, Ay" Released: 2004; 6. "Como Suena" Released: 2004

The Piece Maker 2 is the third studio album by American record producer and DJ Tony Touch. It was released on February 24, 2004 through Touch Entertainment and Koch Records. Production was handled by Ray Roll, Domingo, Erick Sermon, Joey Blitz, Juju, Pete Rock, Psycho Les, Q-Unique, RZA, Sean C and Tony Touch himself. It features guest appearances from Black Rob, Dead Prez, Def Squad, Don Chezina, Doo Wop, Fat Joe, G. Dep, Hurricane G, Juju, Large Professor, Masta Ace, Method Man, Nature, N.O.R.E., P. Diddy, Pete Rock, Q-Unique, Raekwon, Rubén Blades, Sean Paul, Slick Rick, Smif-N-Wessun, Soni and U-God.

The album debuted at number 53 on the Top R&B/Hip-Hop Albums and number 12 on the Independent Albums charts in the United States. Its only charted single, "Ay Ay Ay", spent 15 weeks on the Hot R&B/Hip-Hop Songs chart, peaking at number 77.

== Critical reception ==
Professional ratings
Review scores
Source	Rating
AllMusic	3/5 stars
Cokemachineglow	70/100%
Now	3/5
RapReviews	8.5/10

Fat Tony of RapReviews praised the album, concluding: "it is the music that speaks loudest, and Tony Touch has come up with a collection of tracks that not only define a moment of time in Hip-Hop culture, they celebrate it". AllMusic's David Jeffries stated: "the album's biggest problem, and one wishes the producer had come up with that extra track that would have turned Piece Maker, Vol. 2 into a classic". Nick Flanagan of Now called it "pretty good, with a solid lineup of veteran East Coast MCs".

== Track listing ==
No.	Title	Writer(s)	Producer(s)	Length
1.	"Tony Navaja" (featuring Rubén Blades)	Joseph Anthony Hernandez; Rubén Blades	Tony Touch	2:47
2.	"Non-Stop" (featuring P. Diddy, Black Rob and G. Dep)	Hernandez; Robert Ross; Trevell Coleman; Arnold Hamilton; Glenn Bolton; Leonardo Roman; Marvin Nemley; Marvin Shahid Wright; Paul Huston	Tony Touch	3:59
3.	"How You Want It" (featuring Def Squad)	Hernandez; Reginald Noble; Erick Sermon; Keith Murray	Erick Sermon	4:03
4.	"Battle Skit"	Hernandez; Ray Cortez	Tony Touch; Ray Roll	0:52
5.	"Capicu" (featuring Fat Joe, Noreaga and Juju)	Hernandez; Joseph Cartagena; Victor Santiago; Jerry Tineo	Juju	3:24
6.	"Rock Steady" (featuring Raekwon, Method Man and U-God)	Corey Woods; Clifford Smith; Lamont Hawkins; Clarence Reid	RZA	3:12
7.	"Dimelo"	Hernandez	Tony Touch	3:19
8.	"Click Bang" (featuring Doo Wop)	Hernandez; Raphael Gonzalez; Harry Whitaker	Tony Touch	3:28
9.	"Ay Ay Ay" (featuring Sean Paul)	Hernandez; Sean Paul Ryan Francis Henriques	Tony Touch	3:04
10.	"Just Be Good to Me" (featuring Soni)		Tony Touch	3:27
11.	"Spanish Harlem, Pt. 2" (featuring Hurricane G and Cocoa Brovaz)	Hernandez; Gloria Rodríguez; Darrell Yates; Tekomin Williams	Tony Touch	4:23
12.	"Battle Skit, Pt. 2"	Hernandez; Cortez	Tony Touch; Ray Roll	0:47
13.	"Spit 1" (featuring Q-Unique)	Anthony Quiles	Q-Unique	2:15
14.	"Out da Box" (featuring Large Professor, Pete Rock and Masta Ace)	Hernandez; William Paul Mitchell; Peter Phillips; Duval Clear	Pete Rock	3:35
15.	"Trouble on the Westside Hwy" (featuring Slick Rick)	Richard Walters; Felipe Bojalil Garza; Mario Arturo Ramos Muñoz	Tony Touch; Domingo	2:44
16.	"A Beautiful Day" (featuring Nature)	Jermain Baxter	Psycho Les	1:38
17.	"Touch 1-Touch All" (featuring Dead Prez)	Hernandez; Clayton Gavin; Lavonne Alford	Sean C	3:51
18.	"Como Suena" (featuring Don Chezina)	Hernandez; Ricardo García Ortiz	Tony Touch	3:10
19.	"Spoken Word"	Joey Aponte	Joey Blitz	2:13
Total length:				56:11

== Charts ==
Chart (2004)	Peak position
US Top R&B/Hip-Hop Albums (Billboard)	53
US Independent Albums (Billboard)	12
