= Information Age (disambiguation) =

Information Age is the historical period of industrial shift to information technology.

It may also refer to:

- Information Age (album), the album by dead prez
- Information Age Publishing, a company
