= Slam (soundtrack) =

Soundtrack album by Various artists
- Released: October 13, 1998
- Recorded: 1997–1998
- Genre: Hip hop
- Length: 1:03:03
- Label: Epic
- Producer: Happy Walters (exec.); Mona Scott (exec.); Ricky Leigh Mensh (exec.); Brand Nubian; Darren Lighty; Dead Prez; DJ Spooky; Flipmode Squad; Havoc; Justin Trugman; KayGee; KRS-One; Mathematics; Pras; Richard Frierson; Spkilla; The Ummah

Professional ratings
Review scores
Source	Rating
AllMusic	2.5/5 stars

Slam: The Soundtrack is the soundtrack to Marc Levin's 1998 film Slam. It was released on October 13, 1998 through Epic Records and consists entirely of hip hop music. The album peaked at number 84 on the Billboard 200 and at number 24 on the Top R&B/Hip-Hop Albums in the United States.

== Track listing ==
No.	Title	Writer(s)	Producer(s)	Length
1.	"Cake B" (performed by Bonz Malone)	B. Malone		0:40
2.	"Sex, Money & Drugs" (performed by Big Pun and Next)	C. Rios; R. Huggar; D. Lighty; K. Gist	Darren Lighty; KayGee	4:02
3.	"The World I Know" (performed by Goodie Mob and Esthero)	R. Barnett; J. Englishman; T. Callaway; C. Gipp; W. Knighton; M. McKinney		5:03
4.	"Thug Poetry" (performed by Noreaga, Brown and Maze)	V. Santiago; A. Brown; M. Allen; E. Almonte	SPK	4:14
5.	"I Dare You" (performed by Black Rob)	R. Ross; H. Pierre; R. Frierson	Richard Frierson	4:15
6.	"Ain't No Stoppin'" (performed by Philly's Most Wanted, Pras and The Product G&B)	P. Michel; A. Holly; J. Witherspoon; N. Hurst; M. Moore-Hough; D. McRae; C. Pope	Pras; Che Pope (co.)	3:43
7.	"Psychopath Nut" (performed by Momolu Stewart)			1:38
8.	"Hey" (performed by Q-Tip)	K. Fareed	The Ummah	3:06
9.	"The Park" (performed by Ol' Dirty Bastard and Coolio)	A. Ivey; R. Jones; J. Thugman	Justin Trugman	3:23
10.	"D.O.P.E. (Drugs Oppress People Everyday)" (performed by dead prez)	C. Gavin; L. Alford	dead prez	4:08
11.	"Why" (performed by Jerome Goldman)			1:46
12.	"Feel My Gat Blow" (performed by Mobb Deep)	A. Johnson; K. Muchita	Havoc	2:49
13.	"I Can See" (performed by Tekitha and Cappadonna)	D. Hill; T. Washington; R. Bean	Allah Mathematics	3:51
14.	"Time Is Running Out" (performed by Brand Nubian)		Brand Nubian	4:50
15.	"Run Free" (performed by Sonja Sohn)			1:26
16.	"Take a Walk in My Shoes" (performed by Flipmode Squad)	T. Smith; R. McNair; W. Lewis; L. Jones; R. Fisher	Flipmode Squad	4:53
17.	"Ocean Within" (performed by KRS-One and Saul Williams)	L. Parker; S. Williams	KRS-One	3:06
18.	"Galactic Funk" (performed by DJ Spooky)	P. Miller	DJ Spooky	3:28
19.	"Sha-Clack-Clack" (performed by Saul Williams)			2:42
Total length:				1:03:03

Sample credits

- Track 2 contains samples from "Sunshine" by Earth, Wind & Fire
- Track 4 contains samples from "Rainbow Ride" by The Charlie Daniels Band
- Track 5 contains samples from "Under the Influence of Love" by Love Unlimited
- Track 6 contains a sample of "One to One" by Brass Construction
- Track 9 contains samples from "Rock Creek Park" by The Blackbyrds

== Charts ==
Chart (1998)	Peak position
US Billboard 200	84
US Top R&B/Hip-Hop Albums (Billboard)	24
