= Chappelle's Show =

American sketch comedy television series (2003–2006)

- Genre: Sketch comedy
- Created by: Dave Chappelle; Neal Brennan
- Written by: Dave Chappelle; Neal Brennan
- Starring: Dave Chappelle; Charlie Murphy; Donnell Rawlings; Paul Mooney; Neal Brennan
- Country of origin: United States
- Original language: English
- No. of seasons: 3
- No. of episodes: 28

Production
- Executive producers: Dave Chappelle; Neal Brennan; Michele Armour
- Running time: 16–26 minutes
- Production companies: Pilot Boy Productions; Marobru Productions; Comedy Partners

Original release
- Network: Comedy Central
- Release: January 22, 2003 – July 23, 2006

Chappelle's Show is an American sketch comedy television series created by comedians Dave Chappelle and Neal Brennan. Chappelle hosted the show and starred in the majority of its sketches. Chappelle, Brennan, and Michele Armour were the show's executive producers. The series premiered on January 22, 2003, on the American cable television network Comedy Central. The show ran for two complete seasons. An abbreviated third season of three episodes aired in 2006, compiled of previously unreleased sketches.

After numerous delays, production of the third season of Chappelle's Show was abruptly ended when Chappelle left the series. Critically acclaimed throughout its run, the series often satirized and examined—through dark and racial humor—race, social stereotypes, masculinity, celebrity culture, and comedy itself. TV Guide included it on their list of "TV's Top 100 Shows" and it was placed 26th on Entertainment Weekly's "New TV Classics" ranking.

== Format ==
The show opened with Chappelle being introduced over the instrumental from the song "Hip-Hop", from the album Let's Get Free by Dead Prez. Chappelle would perform a short stand up in front of a live audience. The focus would then shift to a prerecorded sketch. The show was notorious for its handling of the topic of sexuality and Chappelle's casual usage of racial epithets. Chappelle performed sketches that premiered intricate cultural topics, such as prostitution, the entertainment industry, gun violence, numerous drug references (particularly marijuana, alcohol, PCP, crystal meth and crack cocaine) and music. The show often closed with a musical performance by a hip hop or soul artist.

== Cast ==
- Dave Chappelle
- Donnell Rawlings
- Dominique Witten
- Neal Brennan
- Rick Crom
- Bill Burr
- Brian Dykstra
- Drake Hill
- Sophina Brown
- William Bogert
- Yoshio Mita
- Paul Mooney
- Charlie Murphy
- Randy Pearlstein
- Robert Petkoff
- Nick Wyman
- Anthony Berry
- Mos Def
- Max Herman
- Allen Levy
- Guillermo Díaz
- Drago Ruschinsky
- Amanda Rowan

=== Frequent or notable guest stars ===
Many guest stars appeared on the show, including Half Baked co-stars Guillermo Díaz, Jim Breuer and Snoop Dogg (who was also a musical guest); RZA, GZA and Method Man of the Wu-Tang Clan, Rick James, Damon Dash, Redman, Ice-T, Arsenio Hall, Wayne Brady (the only guest to appear on stage), Mos Def (who was also a musical guest), Eddie Griffin, Susan Sarandon, Q-Tip, Rashida Jones, Jamie Foxx, Carson Daly, Ron Jeremy, Bill Burr, Patrice O’Neal, Rich Vos, Spike Lee, Michael Rapaport and Joe Rogan.

Musical guests included De La Soul, Ludacris, Robert Petkoff, Talib Kweli, Fat Joe, Wyclef Jean, Killer Mike, Big Boi of OutKast, Anthony Hamilton, Kanye West, Common, DMX, Busta Rhymes, Slum Village, John Mayer, Questlove, Cee-Lo Green, Vida Guerra, Erykah Badu and Lil Jon.

== Notable sketches ==
Rather than acting out sketches in front of a live studio audience, the sketches were prerecorded with the audience reaction usually used in lieu of a laugh track. According to Neal Brennan in the season-two DVD commentary, the production team never edited in prerecorded laughs, with the exception of the "Dude's Night Out" sketch due to the lack of reaction from the audience.

- A Moment in the Life of Lil Jon – Chappelle plays rapper/producer Lil Jon doing normal, everyday tasks, with a vocabulary consisting of almost nothing but the words 'Yeah!', 'HWHAT?!', and 'O-kay!' The real Lil Jon appeared in one sketch opposite Chappelle's character, with Lil Jon speaking in an excessively dignified accent. The rapper credited the sketch with increasing his visibility. Entertainment Weekly put it on its end-of-the-decade, "best-of" list, saying, "We could have filled this list with 100 reasons we miss Chappelle's Show, but the biggest one would have to be his riotous celebrity impressions."
- Charlie Murphy's True Hollywood Stories – Charlie Murphy (who also wrote the sketches) retells his encounters with 1980s celebrities, the most popular being the Rick James story. The sketch features Murphy as himself and Chappelle as James, including incidents such as James slapping Murphy and referring to him as "Darkness", interspersed with cuts from an interview with the actual present-day Rick James trying to minimize his past behavior, saying, "Cocaine's a hell of a drug." The sketch spawned one of the show's popular catchphrases, "I'm Rick James, bitch!", which Chappelle, as James, repeatedly declares. The sketch attained even greater public attention when, in 2005, a candidate for city council in Hattiesburg, Mississippi, also named Rick James but unrelated to the singer, had many of his "Vote Rick James" campaign signs defaced by writing "Vote Rick James bitch!" or stolen by fans of the sketch. The other "True Hollywood Story" depicted Murphy and his crew losing a pickup game of basketball against Prince. Both Rick James and Prince have confirmed the stories were true, with James's admission coming in unreleased interview footage produced for the skit. Prince's confirmation came in an interview with MTV, in which he stated "The whupping is true". Prince later used an image of Chappelle dressed as Prince as the cover of his single "Breakfast Can Wait".
- Frontline – A spoof of the PBS series of the same name, it was hosted by Kent Wallace (played by William Bogert). The first Frontline sketch, "Blind Supremacy", featured the life of Clayton Bigsby (played by Chappelle), a blind white supremacist who is not aware that he is actually a black man. Grantland.com writer Rembert Browne deemed this sketch the winner of his "Best Chappelle Sketch Ever", beating out the Wayne Brady sketch in his 64-sketch, NCAA Tournament style bracket. This sketch was part of the first episode and garnered attention for its extensive use of the word "nigger" (mostly spoken by Chappelle's character). The sketch has been compared to the iconic "word association" Saturday Night Live sketch from 1975 featuring Chevy Chase and Richard Pryor which received similar reactions for its use of the word. Charlie Sheen has claimed that he was hospitalized in 2010 as a result of developing a hernia from laughing so hard upon viewing the sketch. Other Frontline sketches featured stories of racist animal actors and gay versions of everything from the DMV to the KKK.
- Racial Draft – A parody of modern-day pro-sports drafts. Various multiracial or multiethnic celebrities such as Tiger Woods (Chappelle), Lenny Kravitz, the Wu-Tang Clan (playing themselves), O. J. Simpson, Eminem and Madonna were "drafted" into a (potentially) entirely different race, based on their perceived ethnicity or some other cultural appropriations in their act or lifestyle. Elián González was recertified as Hispanic, after being culturally appropriated by white America. Lenny Kravitz was declared 100% Jewish, the Wu-Tang Clan 100% Asian, and Tiger Woods 100% black. Chappelle also played the white announcer/representative, while rapper Mos Def played the black representative; radio personality Angie Martinez played the Hispanic representative.
- WacArnold's – Chappelle gets a job as a young man at a fast-food restaurant that portrays itself as providing a community service by offering jobs to disenfranchised, poor youth. A scene-by-scene mock of a 1990 McDonald's commercial is followed by Chappelle slowly realizing the job is embarrassing and he does not make enough money to support his family. He gets robbed and harassed on his way to work. During one encounter in the last scene of the sketch, a thug (played by Donnell Rawlings) quips, "Hey Calvin! It's a fine line between fries and shakes!" before he breaks into song, "The leanest burger in the world, could be the meanest burger in the world, if you cook it that way!" He follows by stating he has to "stop smoking this shit here" as his friends break out in laughter. The song is a remake of a 1971 song by The Persuaders (also covered by The Pretenders in 1983 and H-Town in 1996), "Thin Line Between Love and Hate".
- Wayne Brady's Show – After Dave Chappelle quits the show in an opening segment that coincidentally mirrored the contract negotiations for the aborted third season, Wayne Brady (portraying himself) takes over as host and is asked to emcee the remaining episodes of the series since Chappelle had already filmed the remaining sketches. Regretting the decision to leave the show, Chappelle returns and confronts Brady. The ensuing confrontation leads to the airing of a flashback to a night of misadventures involving the two that portrays Brady (contrary to his friendly public image) as a murderous, pimping, and seriously disturbed sociopath in the mold of Denzel Washington's character Alonzo Harris from the film Training Day. Brady had trouble filming the sketch, finding it difficult to say the line "Is Wayne Brady gonna have to choke a bitch?".
- When Keeping It Real Goes Wrong – A documentary style sketch, it serves as a cautionary tale about when not to "keep it real" (be completely honest). The sketch depicts events in which a character is just minding his business until someone else says or does something that the first character does not like. The character is given a choice: ignore the alleged provocation, or "keep it real" (get confrontational and be antagonistic with whoever provoked him), with the character going with the latter, all the while boasting about how they "keep it real". Eventually, the character's decision backfires severely on him, thus ruining his life, while the person who provoked him is having the time of his life, and the character's friends shun the character's choice to "keep it real".
- Player Hater's Ball – Guest starring Ice-T, the sketch featured Chappelle and several other regulars attending a convention of "haters", i.e. people who make hurtful and deprecating comments towards others. The characters all dressed and acted in the manner of flamboyant 1970s pimps. The convention featured an award for "hater of the year" and an ad-libbed segment where the attendees were shown pictures of celebrities such as Rosie O'Donnell and Kelly Osbourne and delivered put downs. This later spawned a sequel called "Haters in Time" where the haters went back in time to when the Africans were slaves and end up killing one of the slave masters.
- Samuel L. Jackson Beer – Filmed as a long-form ad, the sketch featured a parody of Samuel Adams Beer sponsored by actor Samuel L. Jackson. Chappelle appeared as Jackson, wearing a wig reminiscent of the actor's hair style in the 1994 movie Pulp Fiction and dressed in Revolutionary War-era garb similar to the spokesman who had recently appeared in Samuel Adams Beer ads. Chappelle's performance played heavily on Jackson's propensity for roles which involve angry shouting and copious profanity. At one point when asked to stop yelling by Bill Burr, Chappelle, as Jackson, yells "No, I can't stop yelling, 'cause that's how I talk! You ain't never seen my movies?"

== Recurring characters ==
- Tron Carter (played by Chappelle) – a cocaine dealer, he is originally shown in a sketch where he has received reparations for slavery and due to a "hot hand in a dice game" becomes the richest man in America. When asked about the infant he carts around in a stroller, Tron says, "I just bought this baby, cash." He is also one of the roommates in The Mad Real World. Later in a spoof of Law & Order, Tron gets the same lenient treatment as those involved in white-collar crime, invoking the "fif" in response to every question. Tron also appeared in the first episode of season three in a sketch in which he described an altercation with Method Man and was tortured by the methods described in the song "Method Man" from Enter the Wu-Tang (36 Chambers). In the reparations episode, he is shown gambling in Brooklyn and described as a Harlem resident, but in another episode, he is shown in his house on "Everglade Boulevard" bagging up cocaine and watching the fictitious R. Kelly music video "Piss on You", and he receives a phone call from the Dade County Police Department, suggesting he lives in Miami.
- Negrodamus – Paul Mooney plays a black prophet and fortune teller (a satire of Nostradamus). In the sketch, people (mostly white) ask him various questions such as "Negrodamus, why do white people love Wayne Brady so much?" to which he replies "White people love Wayne Brady because he makes Bryant Gumbel look like Malcolm X." (This clip was later shown as a drug hallucination in the Wayne Brady sketch.)
- Tyrone Biggums – Chappelle plays a squeaky-voiced crack addict recognized by his white, blistered lips and constant scratching. His first appearance was in the second episode of season one. He is often heard saying, "I smoke rocks" and "SHAZAM!" Tyrone enjoys eating peanut butter and crack sandwiches, and was the spokesman for "Red Balls", an energy drink made from cocaine. He also made an appearance in a Fear Factor spoof sketch on the "Wayne Brady's Show" episode, wherein he was exceptionally willing to do gross challenges, and was nonreactive to the hot coals underneath his feet, which lit his big toenail on fire (the same fire from which he would later light a cigarette). Biggums was featured in "The World's Greatest Wars" segment where he was a cellmate of River Terrace Crew leader General Cornrow Wallace (Mos Def).
- "Silky" Johnson (played by Chappelle) – A notorious player hater, he won the fictitious "Hater of the Year" award twice (one of which was for calling a bomb threat on the Special Olympics), and who later traveled back in time to "hate" in the past.
- Chuck Taylor (played by Chappelle) – The lead "white" anchor on the fictitious "News 3", he is played by Chappelle in whiteface makeup and a blonde wig. Taylor has appeared in a few sketches, the first of which was the "Reparations" sketch from season one.
- Leonard Washington (played by Chappelle) – Washington first appeared in the first-season sketch "Trading Spouses", wherein he acted as the patriarch of a white family for a month. Notably, when entering rooms unfamiliar to him, Washington looks out the windows to see if he is being followed. He also expressed his displeasure that many white families do not use washcloths when taking a shower or bath. One of the only things that can make Leonard Washington back down is being shot. When asked for his hometown in the "World Series of Dice" sketch, Washington replied, "Where I'm from? A little town called none ya goddamn bidness." He has a wife and a son, T-Mart. He is seemingly unaware of white culture, unknowing of Renée Zellweger (as he stated in "Trading Spouses" after reading White People Magazine).
- Ashy Larry (played by Donnell Rawlings) – A shirtless black man with flaky-white skin and chapped lips, he is always seen wearing a pair of white boxer shorts. He appeared in the "World Series of Dice" sketch, in one of Chappelle's daydreams during a boring dinner conversation, and was seen holding Chappelle's $50 million check in one of the lost episodes. Ashy Larry is also one of the names Wayne Brady calls the PCP he gives to Dave in the Wayne Brady sketch. Rawlings briefly reprised his role as Ashy Larry in the sketch comedy show, In the Flow with Affion Crockett, encountering Chappelle (played by Crockett), as well as on the January 18, 2025 episode of Saturday Night Live.
- Robot Dancing Man – Set designer Karl Lake did the robot dance in random places, including a barbershop, club, and a courtroom (in a deleted scene). In the sketches, he is generally not acknowledged, despite the out-of-place behavior, nor does he acknowledge anyone. A few exceptions to this rule have occurred. One of them is during the "Slow-Motion" sketch, in the club, when Dave acknowledges him by saying "The Robot", and emulating him. Another is when Wayne Brady "takes over" the show, during one of the commercial break introductions; Wayne is looking at Robot Man's moves, and proceeds to dance with him. Also, in the opening theme for season three, Charlie Murphy and Donnell Rawlings have hogtied and taken the place of the two men who start off the show. Robot Man is seen in the background doing his dance and the harmonica player yells out "Robot, help us!", but to no avail.

== Episodes ==
Season	Episodes	Originally released	
Season	Episodes	First released	Last released
1	12	January 22, 2003	April 9, 2003
2	13	January 21, 2004	April 14, 2004
3	3	July 9, 2006	July 23, 2006

In total, 28 episodes of Chappelle's Show produced between 2003 and 2006, in addition to a Music Jump-Off special and four compilation episodes.

=== Season 1 (2003) ===
No. overall	No. in season	Original air date	Musical guest	Sketches
1	1	January 22, 2003	none	Mitsubishi Commercial, Popcopy, Nat King Cole, Home Stenographer, Frontline: Clayton Bigsby
2	2	January 29, 2003	Mos Def	Pretty White Girl Sings Dave's Thoughts, HBO: Real Sex Street Interview, Dave's Educated Guess Line, Wrap It Up, Tyrone Biggums Classroom Visit
3	3	February 5, 2003	Talib Kweli	QVC Meltdown, Roots outtakes, Zapped, It's a Wonderful Chest
4	4	February 12, 2003	Busta Rhymes	iMac commercial, Dave on Donahue, New York Boobs, Truf.com Ad, Reparations 2003
5	5	February 19, 2003	Fat Joe	Roca Pads, Redman Potty Fresh, Great Moments in Hookup History, Ask a Black Dude, Inside Chappelle's Show Studio, Redman's Potty Fresh reprise
6	6	February 26, 2003	David Broom	Third World Girls Gone Wild, The Dave Chappelle Story, Ask a Gay Dude, The Mad Real World
7	7	March 5, 2003	Killer Mike	Great Moments in Hookup History, Real Movies (The Matrix/Pretty Woman), Wu Tang Financial, Ask a Black Dude, Jedi Sex Scandal
8	8	March 12, 2003	Slum Village	Real Movies (Ghost/Half Baked), Great Moments in Hookup History, Frontline: Racist Hollywood Animals, Tyrone Biggums Crack Intervention, "What Men Want"
9	9	March 19, 2003	The Roots	Life Like a Video Game, Blackzilla, Two-Minute Special, The Player Hater's Ball
10	10	March 26, 2003	GZA	R. Kelly's "Piss on You" music videos, Ask a Black Dude, History's Greatest Wars, Real Movies (Deep Impact)
11	11	April 2, 2003	De La Soul	Fisticuffs, Make a Wish, Crazy Camera
12	12	April 9, 2003	Black Star	Trading Spouses, O'Dweeds, And-1Videos, Diarrhea Choir, NBA players

=== Specials (2003–04) ===
No.	Title	Original release date	Sketches
1	"The Best of Chappelle's Show Volume 1 Mixtape"	April 13, 2003	Roca Pads, Wu Tang Financial, Frontline: Clayton Bigsby
2	"The Best of Chappelle's Show Volume 2 Mixtape"	July 16, 2003	More highlight sketches from Season 1
3	"The Best of Chappelle's Show Season 2: Volume 1"	April 21, 2004	The Niggar Family, Samuel Jackson beer, Jury Duty, The Wayne Brady Show
4	"Music Jump-Off"	April 27, 2004	Chappelle shows highlights of music-related sketches and performances some of which were previously unaired
5	"The Best of Chappelle's Show Season 2: Volume 2"	May 4, 2004	Charlie Murphy's True Hollywood Stories - Prince, Racial Draft, White People Dancing

=== Season 2 (2004) ===
No. overall	No. in season	Original air date	Musical guest	Sketches
13	1	January 21, 2004	none	Genetic Dissenter, Samuel Jackson beer, Campaign Advertisements, Better in Slow Motion, The Racial Draft
14	2	January 28, 2004	DMX	WacArnold's, Black Gallagher, The Niggar Family, Negrodamus
15	3	February 4, 2004	John Mayer, Questlove, Dave Chappelle	White People Dancing, Ribs Sleep-Aid, The 3 Daves
16	4	February 11, 2004	Ludacris	The Love Contract (with Rashida Jones), Charlie Murphy's True Hollywood Stories: Rick James
17	5	February 18, 2004	Cee-Lo Green	Tron Carter - special "Law & Order" episode, Tyrone Biggums - Red Balls Energy Drink, Negrodamus, Charlie Murphy's True Hollywood Stories - Prince
18	6	February 25, 2004	Anthony Hamilton	A Moment in the Life of Lil Jon, If the Internet Was a Real Place, When Keeping It Real Goes Wrong
19	7	March 3, 2004	Common, Kanye West	A Moment in the Life of Lil Jon, Marijuana Commercial, Mooney on Movies, The World Series of Dice, When Keeping It Real Goes Wrong
20	8	March 10, 2004	Erykah Badu	I Know Black People, When Keeping It Real Goes Wrong
21	9	March 17, 2004	Wyclef Jean	Sales Pitches, Dave Gets Oprah Pregnant, Jury Duty
22	10	March 24, 2004	Snoop Dogg ft. Tyrone Biggums	Making the Band, Dude's Night Out, Kneehigh Park
23	11	March 31, 2004	Kanye West, Mos Def, Freeway	Greatest Misses – Haters in Time, Holla Service, Frontline: In a Gay World, Nelson Mandela's boot camp
24	12	April 7, 2004	Talib Kweli	The Wayne Brady Show, Fear Factor: Tyrone Biggums, special appearances by Joe Rogan, Big Boi & Nick Cannon
25	13	April 14, 2004	Big Boi	Profiles In Courage, A Moment in the Life of Lil Jon (with the real Lil Jon), Black Bush (with Jamie Foxx as Black Tony Blair)

=== Season 3: "The Lost Episodes" (2006) ===
No. overall	No. in season	Original air date	Sketches
26	1	July 9, 2006	Dave has $55 million, Hip-Hop News, Dave Gets Revenge, Tupac is still alive
27	2	July 16, 2006	Black Howard Dean, Watching TV while having sex, The real side of Gary Coleman, Stereotype Pixies/Audience Feedback
28	3	July 23, 2006	Black Monsters, "Minorities" in the News, Dave Meets Show Business: Merchandising, Lil' Jon in Love, Dave on MTV Cribs.

== Third season delays and The Lost Episodes ==
During a June 2004 stand-up performance in Sacramento, California, Chappelle left the stage due to audience members interrupting the show by shouting, "I'm Rick James, bitch!," a catchphrase from the popular "Rick James" sketch. After a few minutes, Chappelle returned and continued by saying, "The show is ruining my life." He stated that he disliked working "20 hours a day" and that the popularity of the show was making it difficult for him to continue his stand-up career which was "the most important thing" to him. He also told the audience:

You know why my show is good? Because the network officials say you're not smart enough to get what I'm doing, and every day I fight for you. I tell them how smart you are. Turns out, I was wrong. You people are stupid.

=== Initial delays ===
The third season of Chappelle's Show was scheduled to premiere in February 2005. This date was pushed back to May 31, 2005, when production fell behind schedule in December 2004 because, according to Comedy Central, Chappelle had fallen ill with the flu. He later revealed to Oprah Winfrey that this was untrue and that stress had caused him to leave. On May 4, 2005, just weeks before the anticipated premiere, Comedy Central announced that Chappelle's Show would not be ready by the announced date and that production had been suspended "until further notice". No reason for the delay or suspension was given and no response was given by Chappelle.

=== Chappelle retreats to South Africa ===
One week later, it was reported (most notably by The New York Times and Entertainment Weekly) that Chappelle had flown to South Africa on April 28 to stay in an undisclosed psychiatric facility. On May 14, Time announced that one of their reporters, Christopher John Farley, had interviewed Chappelle in South Africa, and that no psychiatric treatments were occurring or necessary. Chappelle returned shortly thereafter and quelled rumors of psychiatric or substance-abuse problems, and emphasized that his trip was a "spiritual retreat" intended to keep his sense of reality outside the bubble of intense pressure and fame and to keep his humor fresh. Chappelle would say that he was unhappy with the direction the show had taken, and expressed in an interview with Time magazine his need for reflection in the face of tremendous stress:

Coming here, I don't have the distractions of fame. It quiets the ego down. I'm interested in the kind of person I've got to become. I want to be well-rounded and the industry is a place of extremes. I want to be well-balanced. I've got to check my intentions, man.

=== Comedy Central responds ===
On July 14, Comedy Central president Doug Herzog announced that Chappelle was welcome back any time, but that the comedian had said he was still not ready to return. Herzog put a positive spin on negotiations, but conceded that he did not expect Chappelle's Show to return in 2005. The New York Times also reported that Chappelle explained to Herzog, over dinner, that his success was getting to him and that "he wanted to be wrong again sometimes, instead of always being right." In August, with Herzog and Chappelle having reportedly not spoken since their June 3 meeting, TV Guide featured an interview with Charlie Murphy, in which he stated, "Chappelle's Show is over, man. Done... It took me a long time to be able to say those words, but I can say it pretty easy now because it's the truth." Around the same time came confirmation from Comedy Central that co-creator Neal Brennan had left the show, and it was later revealed a rift had formed between him and Chappelle.

Nonetheless, on December 11, during Comedy Central's Last Laugh '05, a promotion for the third season of the show was aired.

=== Chappelle speaks ===
On February 3, 2006, Chappelle made his first television interview since production ceased on season three, on The Oprah Winfrey Show. He stated that burnout, losing his creative control, and a work environment that was uncomfortable, were some of the reasons he left the show. He also expressed his contempt for the entertainment industry's tone-deafness regarding black entertainers and audiences, "When I see that they put every black man in the movies in a dress at some point in their career, I start connecting the dots."

Chappelle said that he felt some of his sketches were "socially irresponsible". He singled out the "pixie sketch", in which pixies appear to people and encourage them to reinforce stereotypes of their races. In the sketch, Chappelle is wearing blackface and is dressed as a character in a minstrel show. According to Chappelle, a white crew member laughed during its filming in a way that made him uncomfortable, saying, "It was the first time I felt that someone was not laughing with me but laughing at me."

He also stated that he would be open to producing the remainder of season three (and perhaps a season four) only if his demands were met, one of which was to ensure that half of the proceeds of future Chappelle's Show DVD sales would go to charity. Chappelle expressed disdain at the possibility of his material from the unfinished third season being aired, saying that to do so would be "a bully move", and that he would not return to the show if Comedy Central were to air the unfinished material. After that announcement, Comedy Central stopped advertising the release of the third season for a period of time.

Chappelle was interviewed for Inside the Actors Studio on December 18, 2005, at Pace University's Michael Schimmel Center for the Arts. The show premiered on February 12, 2006. Chappelle said on the program that the death of his father seven years prior influenced his decision to go to South Africa. By throwing himself into his work, he had not taken a chance to mourn his father's death. He also said the rumors that he was in drug or psychiatric treatment only persuaded him to stay in South Africa. He said, "I would go to work on the show and I felt awful every day, that's not the way it was. ... I felt like some kind of prostitute or something. If I feel so bad, why keep on showing up to this place? I'm going to Africa. The hardest thing to do is to be true to yourself, especially when everybody is watching."

=== The Lost Episodes air ===
In April, the network wrapped up production of the third season, taping the live studio audience segments for three episodes. In place of Chappelle, the last episodes were cohosted by regular cast members Charlie Murphy and Donnell Rawlings. Advertised as "The Lost Episodes", they began airing on July 9, 2006. The third and final episode aired on July 23, 2006. The DVD collection of the lost episodes was released on July 25, 2006.

Chappelle's decision to quit the show meant walking away from a $50 million contract with Comedy Central. When asked if he felt guilty about carrying on with the lost episodes without Chappelle, Rawlings replied:

I'm a loyal person, but I know that as a professional, I've got to keep my career going, and I felt it was an opportunity for me, for people [to] see what I do as funny ... without knowing what Dave Chappelle's agenda is, the reasons why he left, with no communication saying, 'Hey guys, I feel this way. I would much rather you not be a part of this process.' Had I had a conversation with Dave like that then there's a possibility that I would reconsider me hosting it.

== Release ==
=== Broadcast ===
Reruns have frequently aired on Comedy Central and VH1 in the US. The series also airs around the world, with episodes airing on MTV in Germany, Comedy Central in Brazil, The Comedy Network and MuchMusic in Canada, SBS, NITV (sister channel to SBS), The Comedy Channel and 7mate in Australia, and FX in the United Kingdom. The series was also shown on WGN America and was syndicated to various television stations across the US, including MyNetworkTV.

=== Home media ===
The DVD sets for seasons one and two of Chappelle's Show have sold extremely well since their release. As of 2005, the first-season DVD was the best-selling TV series set of all time, beating out other popular shows such as The Simpsons (the first season of which held the record beforehand), American Dad!, Family Guy, Friends, and Seinfeld. According to an October 2010 USA Today article, Season 1 had sold over two million copies.

Although the DVDs are "uncensored", some of the music performances were removed due to licensing issues. Also the episode "Music Jump-Off" which featured Chappelle visiting his old high school, the Duke Ellington School of the Arts, intercut with previously unaired sketches and musical performances, did not make either DVD set.

On October 11, 2005, the first half of the first season was released on UMD.

On May 23, 2006, the first uncensored season was made available for purchase on the iTunes Music Store, and on June 20, the second uncensored season was also made available on iTunes.

On June 5, 2007, Comedy Central released a compilation DVD titled The Best of Chappelle's Show which highlights 25 of the most popular sketches in all seasons.

On November 20, 2007, Comedy Central released a boxset with season one, season two, and "the Lost Episodes" titled Chappelle's Show – The Series Collection.

All box sets were released by Paramount Home Entertainment (under the Comedy Central banner).

==== DVD releases ====
DVD name	Release date	# of Eps	Additional information
Season 1 Uncensored	February 24, 2004	12	This 2 disc box set includes 12 episodes from Season 1. Bonus features include Deleted scene/Gag reel, 20 Minute Featurette Ask A Black Dude with Paul Mooney, Audio commentary on 5 Episodes and on the Deleted scenes/Gag reel.
Season 2 Uncensored	May 24, 2005	13	This 3 disc box set includes 13 episodes from Season 2. Bonus features include New Stand Up Material From Chappelle, Uncut Rick James interview, Gag reel and Deleted scenes.
The Lost Episodes Uncensored	July 25, 2006	3	This single disc box set includes the 3 episodes from the unfinished third season. Bonus features include unaired sketches, Fabulous Making of Chappelle's Show Documentary, Audio commentary by Charlie Murphy, Donnell Rawlings and Neal Brennan, Blooper reel and Deleted scenes.
The Best of Chappelle's Show Uncensored	June 5, 2007	Compilation	This compilation highlights 25 of the most popular sketches in all seasons in an uncensored format.
The Series Collection	November 20, 2007	28	All episodes from Season One, Season Two, and "The Lost Episodes".

=== Streaming ===
The series is available to be streamed on the Comedy Central app and website. The series is also available to stream on Paramount+, Netflix, and HBO Max. It is free to digitally rent with select public libraries in the United States through Hoopla.

On November 1, 2020, the series became available to stream on Netflix and HBO Max. However, less than two months later, the series was removed from both services following Chappelle's commentary concerning his lack of royalties from the show during his appearance on Saturday Night Live. On February 11, 2021, Chappelle announced that he had renegotiated his deal with ViacomCBS, and the show returned to the services the following day. Despite the renegotiated deal, Season 3 (the "lost episodes") were not reposted to Netflix, and has also been withdrawn from other platforms where it was available previously like Crave in Canada.

== See also ==
- Dave Chappelle's Block Party
