= The Rose, Vol. 2 =

Compilation album (Poetry) by various
- Released: September 20, 2005 (US)
- Recorded: 2005
- Genre: Poetry
- Length: 56:43
- Label: Amaru Entertainment

Professional ratings
Review scores
Source	Rating
AllMusic	2/5 stars
RapReviews.com	4.5/10

The Rose, Vol. 2 is a 2005 posthumous album of Tupac Shakur's poetry. This album features recordings of Tupac's poetry in musical form, by other well-known artists such as Ludacris and Bone Thugs n Harmony. Tupac's poems are quoted, sung or simply used as inspiration for each track on this album. This is the second album of Tupac's poetry; the first, The Rose that Grew from Concrete, contains his poems being read and sung by other musical performers.

== Track listing ==
No.	Title	Performer(s)	Length
1.	"Intro"	Black Ice	1:12
2.	"Power of a Smile"	Bone Thugs-n-Harmony	4:38
3.	"The Eternal Lament"	Celina	4:04
4.	"Fallen Star"	Talib Kweli	4:49
5.	"In the Depths of Solitude"	Ludacris	4:18
6.	"Movin' On"	Lyfe Jennings	2:59
7.	"Life Through My Eyes"	Tupac & Memphis Bleek	4:12
8.	"When Ure Heart Turns Cold"	Outlawz	3:51
9.	"Black Women"	Jamal Joseph & Che Davis	3:00
10.	"Only 4 the Righteous"	Yo-Yo	3:41
11.	"Where There Is a Will..."	Boot Camp Clik	4:47
12.	"When Ur Hero Falls"	Impact Kids & Jessica "Betty Jo" Santos	3:31
13.	"And 2morrow"	Shock G	3:35
14.	"If I Fail"	Dead Prez	4:20
15.	"Poetry"	Amber and Morgan (2Pac's Kids)	3:45
