= Guilty or Innocent of Using the N Word =

2006 film by Bhavna Malkani

- Directed by: Bhavna Malkani
- Written by: Bhavna Malkani
- Starring: M-1; Grouchy Greg; The Last Emperor; Marchitect
- Music by: The 49ers
- Release date: 2006
- Running time: 28 minutes
- Country: United Kingdom
- Language: English

Guilty or Innocent of Using the N Word is a 2006 British documentary short film directed by British director Bhavna Malkani. The documentary explores questions and issues surrounding the word nigger that many feel constrained to discuss, as it is often categorized as a taboo word. The twenty-eight-minute film investigates the word chronologically, discussing the history of the word from its origins all the way to rap's influence on the acceptance and commercialization of the term.

== Cast ==
Guest appearances in the documentary include M-1 of Dead Prez, Grouchy Greg, CEO of AllHipHop, Philadelphia rapper The Last Emperor, hip-hop producer/rapper Marchitect and others.

== Filming and reception ==
The documentary was filmed in London, England; New York, New York; Newark, Delaware; and Philadelphia, Pennsylvania. Guilty or Innocent of Using the N Word won the London Film Convention Award at the Portobello Film Festival in 2006 and Best Short Documentary at New York's 5th Annual H2O Odyssey International Hip-Hop Awards in 2007. The documentary was also short listed to win Best Film at the 5th Buffalo Film Festival in October 2007.

== See also ==
- The N-Word
