= Hip-Hop (Dead Prez song) =

Single by Dead Prez

Single by Dead Prez

from the album Let's Get Free
- Released: March 30, 1999
- Genre: Hip hop
- Length: 3:34
- Label: Loud
- Songwriters: Khnum Ibomu; Mutulu Olugbala
- Producer: Hedrush

Dead Prez singles chronology
"Police State" (1998)	"Hip-Hop" (1999)	"'They' Schools" (1999)

Music video
- "Hip-Hop" on YouTube

"Hip-Hop" is a song by American hip hop duo Dead Prez, released on March 30, 1999 as a single from their debut studio album Let's Get Free (2000). Produced by production group Hedrush and Dead Prez, it is the duo's best-known song.

== Composition and lyrics ==
The production of the song features a "warped, wobbly" bassline. Lyrically, Dead Prez criticizes the capitalist functions of the music industry and its exploitation of black people ("These record labels slang our tapes like dope / You can be next in line and signed and still be writing rhymes and broke"), and encourages the idea of using hip hop music as a means to promote social change. In the first verse, M‑1 promotes staying true to oneself as a rapper, and Stic.man echoes the song's message in his final lines.

== Critical reception ==
The song received positive reviews from music critics. Andy Capper of NME described it as "A truly remarkable, inventive track - with its crazy, twisting boa constrictor bassline and blazing, call-to-arms chorus - it's a fierce declaration of war on hip-hop capitalists and an urgent reminder for rappers and fans alike to consider the bigger picture, asking them: 'Would you rather have a Lexus or justice?'" Billboard ranked it as one of the greatest songs of 1999.

== Remix ==
A remix of the song "It's Bigger Than Hip-Hop" appears on Let's Get Free. This version features Tahir (of Hedrush) and The People's Army and was produced by Kanye West and Dead Prez.

== In popular culture ==
The song served as the opening music for Chappelle's Show (where the instrumental version of the song is used) and the documentary series Hip-Hop Evolution.

== Charts ==
=== "Hip-Hop" ===
Chart (1999–2000)	Peak position
UK Singles (Official Charts)	41
US Hot Rap Songs (Billboard)	49

=== "It's Bigger Than Hip-Hop" ===
Chart (2000)	Peak position
US Hot Rap Songs (Billboard)	43
