= DJ Ezasscul =

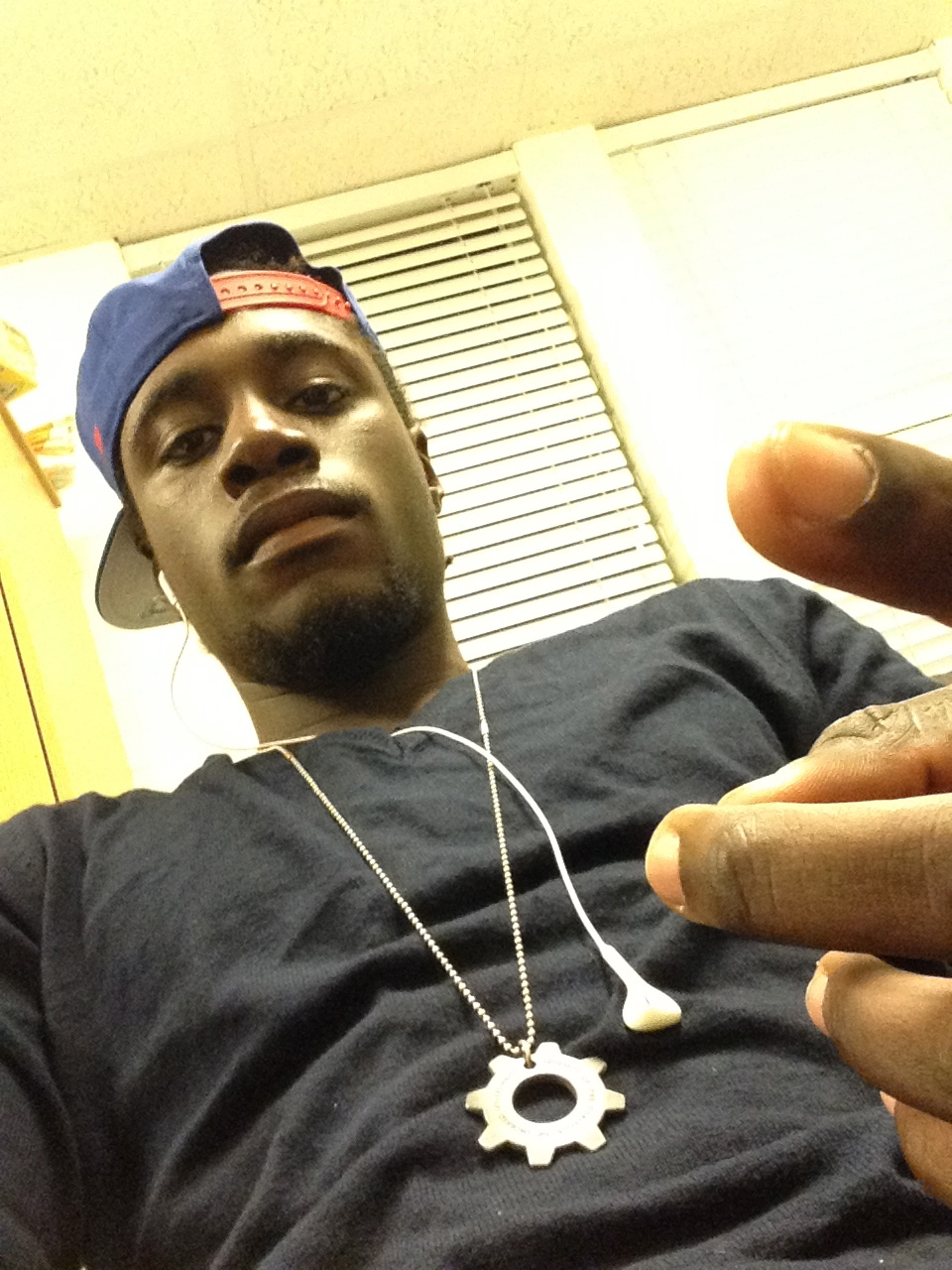

Background information
- Also known as: DJ Ezasscul
- Born: Ricky Lascaze; November 23, 1992 (age 33); Brooklyn, New York
- Genre: Hip-Hop
- Occupation: Hip-Hop Producer
- Instrument: FL Studio
- Label: Digi Crates Records / Jazzy Peace Records
- Website: www.djezasscul.bandcamp.com

Ricky Lascaze (born November 23, 1992) is an American hip-hop DJ and producer from Brooklyn, New York who records under the name DJ Ezasscul. For a brief period of time he was a member of the rap group Supreme & Eaze with Missouri rapper, Supreme Sol. DJ Ezasscul is also founder of the independent label Jazzy Peace Records.

== Music career ==
Lascaze began producing music, at age 14, when he was in his sophomore year of High School. His music career officially began in 2010, with the debut of his first release titled "State of Mind" on Digi Crates Records. State Of Mind, which released when Ezasscul was 17 years of age, debuted at #23 on iTunes Japan top 200 Hip-Hop/Rap albums, and it received mixed reviews from its audience.

== Jazz Meditation series ==
DJ Ezasscul is best known for his Jazz Meditation series, a trilogy album, released by both Libyus Music and Digi Crates Records. Jazz Meditation 1, 2, and 3 are primarily instrumental releases but feature a short amount of rappers on a few songs on the album. Jas Mace of The 49ers is featured on Jazz Meditation 1 on the song "Time Passes". The song "When She Smiles" is a collaborative effort between DJ Ezasscul and English producer Thomas Prime.

Moldovan rapper Fresh Sly, who is another artist on Digi Crates Records, is featured on Jazz Meditation 2 on the song "Steady Vibes", which samples "A Day In The Park" by Michał Urbaniak. Jazz Meditation 2, which was released by Libyus Music, was the only album of the trilogy to gain a review: it received 3 stars out of 5 in a review by thewordisbond.com.

Jazz Meditation 3, the last of the trilogy, features the most rappers out of DJ Ezasscul's albums. Supreme Sol is featured on the song "Take It Ez", Ghostra Nostra, another artist on Digi Crates Records, is featured on the songs "Hi (Yenny Love)" and "As Time Goes By". Similar to Jazz Meditation 2, Jazz Meditation 3 also features foreign rappers, including the Iceland rap group Sonin on the song "Ez Does It" and Japanese rapper 2mo'key on the song "Phantasm".

== Reception ==
In 2010, DJ Ezasscul released a free tribute project dedicated to Nujabes, titled "Remembering Nujabes", along with DJ Sorama, DJ B.M.C. and FreshGalaxy. Ezasscul has been featured on Tribute To Jun 1, 2 and 3, a compilation album dedicated to Nujabes by Digi Crates Records. Ezasscul's instrumentals are known for having jazz samples incorporated into them; for example, songs like "Lunar Winds" which samples "Moonstreams" by Grover Washington Jr. and "Tempara" which samples "Nica's Dream" by Art Farmer.

In an interview with Syrup Daily, DJ Ezasscul stated that Fat Jon and Uyama Hiroto were his idols, along with Nujabes and Pete Rock. As a DJ, Ezasscul is known for his critically acclaimed mix-tape "92 'Til Infinity", which was featured on thewordisbond.com. Released in February 20, 2012, "92 'Til Infinity" is a full-length hip-hop mix-tape by DJ Ezasscul which features classics hits by various Hip-Hop acts from the golden era of Hip-Hop such as Lords Of The Underground, Kris Kross and Big L.

== Equipment ==
Ezasscul's production setup is strictly software; he uses various audio programs, including a digital audio workstation and Virtual Studio Technology, with FL Studio for production. Programs such as Cubase, VirtualDJ and Purity help him with music production. He samples and records digitally, via mp3's and WAV's. For a brief period of time, he used a MPD 24 and an MPC 2000XL.

An interview with insidetherift features an article that displays DJ Ezasscul's equipment used to produce "Origins" and the albums that followed after. Some of the equipment includes the Tascam DM24 Digital Mixing Console, Modded Technic's 1200 MK2, Vestax PMC 05 v3, MXL 4000, Serato SL1, Sony DR-7A and a Yamaha SU700 paired with Adobe Audition, Serato and FL Studio.

== Discography ==
- An Art Called Music (2010) via Independent Release
- Speechless Mixtape (2010) via Independent Release
- State Of Mind (2010) via Digi Crates Records
- Jazz Meditation (2010) via Digi Crates Records
- The Soul Tape (Mix-Tape) (2011) via Independent Release
- Jazz Meditation 2 (2011) via Libyus Music
- Jazz Meditation 2: The Prequel (2011) via Digi Crates Records
- Bassed On Bass (Mix-Tape) (2011) via Independent Release
- Fine Hip-Hop Instrumentals (Mix-Tape) via Independent Release
- Soular Waves Pt. 1 (Mix-Tape) via Independent Release
- Jazz Meditation 3 (2011) via Digi Crates Records
- Jazz Meditation: Trilogy (2012) via Jazzy Peace Records
- Painting Today (2012) via Digi Crates Records & Jazzy Peace Records
- Samurai Champloo Music Records: Arrival (2012) via Jazzy Peace Records
- Origins (2016) via Dust Wax Records
