= Turn Off the Radio: The Mixtape Vol. 1 =

Mixtape by Dead Prez
- Released: November 19, 2002
- Genre: Political hip hop; gangsta rap
- Length: 47:50
- Label: Holla Black
- Producer: Dead Prez, Mike Dean, N.O. Joe, Uncle Eddie

Dead Prez chronology
Let's Get Free (2000)	Turn Off the Radio: The Mixtape Vol. 1 (2002)	Turn Off the Radio Vol. 2: Get Free or Die Tryin (2003)

Professional ratings
Review scores
Source	Rating
AllMusic	3/5 stars

Turn Off the Radio: The Mixtape Vol. 1 is a mixtape by political hip hop duo Dead Prez. The mixtape was released on November 19, 2002. It was released under the pseudonym DPZ due to a contractual conflict Dead Prez had with their former record label.

== Track listing ==
No.	Title	Length
1.	"Intro"	0:56
2.	"Turn Off the Radio"	2:59
3.	"That's War!"	2:09
4.	"We Need a Revolution"	2:06
5.	"B.I.G. Respect"	1:27
6.	"Hit Me, Hit Me"	0:52
7.	"Food, Clothes + Shelter, Pt. 2"	2:42
8.	"Soulja Life Mentality"	4:20
9.	"Get Up"	3:47
10.	"Know Your Enemy"	3:18
11.	"It Was Written"	3:31
12.	"No Love"	4:52
13.	"Look Around"	2:21
14.	"Old School-Survival"	0:36
15.	"Sellin' D.O.P.E."	3:24
16.	"Hood News"	1:19
17.	"Tho It Up"	3:06
18.	"Hip Hop (RBG Mix)"	4:05

== Notes and samples ==
- Track 2: "Turn Off the Radio" was later released as "Radio Freq" on the Revolutionary But Gangsta album.
- Track 3: "That's War!" Samples from "Whoa!" by Black Rob.
- Track 4: "We Need a Revolution" samples from "We Need a Resolution" by Aaliyah.
- Track 5: "B.I.G. Respect" samples from "Juicy" by The Notorious B.I.G.
- Track 7: "Food, Clothes + Shelter, Pt. 2" is the Sequel to the duo's debut single "Food, Clothes + Shelter".
- Track 8: "Soulja Life Mentality" is a rename of "Soulja 4 Life" by Soulja Slim (originally released in 2001).
- Track 9: "Get Up" originally released on The Coup's Party Music album.
- Track 11: "It Was Written" samples from "It Was Written" by Damian Marley.
- Track 13: "Look Around" originally released on The Beatnuts' A Musical Massacre album.
- Track 15: "Sellin' D.O.P.E." originally released on the Slam: The Soundtrack album.
- Track 18: "Hip Hop (RBG Mix)" Samples from "Break Ya Neck" by Busta Rhymes

== Charts ==
Chart (2002)	Peak position
US Top R&B/Hip-Hop Albums	78
US Independent Albums	30
