= Manhood (album) =

Studio album by stic.man
- Released: October 23, 2007
- Recorded: 2007
- Genre: Hip hop
- Length: 62:55
- Label: Boss Up Inc. / Traffic
- Producer: stic.man, J. Wells, Hi-Tek, Sol Messiah, Abu

Stic.man chronology
Soldier 2 Soldier (2006)	Manhood (2007)	The Workout (2011)

Manhood is the debut solo album by rapper stic.man (from the hip-hop duo dead prez). The album was released October 23, 2007.

== Track listing ==
#	Title	Featured guest(s)	Producer(s)	Length
1	"Year of the Tiger"	Young Noble	Stic.man	2:32
2	"Do It Big"	Khujo Goodie	Sol Messiah	4:02
3	"Hold Up (Skit)"			0:08
4	"Get Yo Hustle Up"		Stic.man	2:21
5	"Black Girl Shine"		J. Wells	3:20
6	"That's What Men Do"		Hi-Tek	3:32
7	"Ball or Fall"	Malachi, Stormey, E.D.I., M-1 & Young Noble	Stic.man	3:47
8	"Traffic Jam"	Crystal Johnson	Stic.man	4:57
9	It's Nice Outside		Hakeem	2:05
10	"Reparations"	Taj	Stic.man	4:33
11	"Coming Home"		Stic.man	5:14
12	"Whatever Daddy Wants"	Maimouna	Stic.man	3:55
13	"So Focused"		Stic.man	4:58
14	"Independent Hustler"	Mykel	J. Wells	3:10
15	"Boss Up"	Mr. Sonshyne	Abu	1:34
16	"Traffic Jam (Radio Mix)"	Crystal Johnson	Stic.man	4:29
17	"Faithful Lover" (Bonus Track)	Maimouna	Stic.man	3:59

Note

Tracks 17-68 = Silent interludes, "Faithful Lover" is actually track 69 on the CD.
