= Let's Get Free =

Studio album by dead prez
- Released: February 8, 2000
- Recorded: 1998–2000
- Genre: Political hip hop
- Length: 69:30
- Labels: Loud; Columbia
- Producers: dead prez; Hedrush; Lord Jamar; Kanye West

Dead prez chronology
Let's Get Free (2000)	RBG: Revolutionary But Gangsta (2004)

Singles from Let's Get Free
- 1. "Police State" Released: October 27, 1998; 2. "Hip-Hop" Released: March 30, 1999; 3. "It's Bigger Than Hip-Hop" Released: December 7, 1999; 4. "I'm a African" Released: 2000; 5. "Mind Sex" Released: August 15, 2000

Let's Get Free is the debut studio album by hip-hop duo dead prez. It was released on February 8, 2000, on Loud Records and Columbia Records. The album is mainly produced by dead prez, along with additional production from Lord Jamar of Brand Nubian, Hedrush, and Kanye West. The album is supported by its five singles: "Police State", "Hip-Hop", "It's Bigger Than Hip-Hop", "I'm a African", and "Mind Sex". The album peaked at number 73 on the U.S. Billboard 200 and number 22 on the U.S. Top R&B/Hip-Hop Albums chart.

The album dives deep into topics such as the public education system, racism, freedom of speech and police brutality. Let's Get Free was followed up with their second studio album, RBG: Revolutionary But Gangsta in 2004, but after the duo started releasing independent work and strayed away from the mainstream.

== Background ==
During Stic.man attendance at Florida Agricultural and Mechanical University in the mid-90s, he met M-1. Once relocating to Brooklyn after FAMU, due to their mutual love for music and similar political ideology (leftist), they both formed a rap duo in 1996.

In the same year that dead prez was formed, they signed a record deal with label Loud Records.

In a 2010 interview with HipHopDX, M-1 goes in depth about the beginning of the process of recording Let's Get Free.

According to me, it started when I met [stic.man]. The reason I always put it in that context is because we were soon to be revolutionaries. On the mission to make sense of what was happening inside the world, I met stic and I'd just moved to Florida to start a new chapter in my life. My family was being destroyed by crack cocaine just like [he] was and so many families were around us. We started to put together our analysis of the world which then came to include the analysis of a revolutionary party called the Uhuru Movement and from there, I was able to put on a new set of glasses that would inform me of how I would need to move in the future in order to change these circumstances and so on and so forth. So all of this growth is what you hear on Let's Get Free. The actually recording of the album didn't happen until six years after we met.

== Concept ==
The album goes deep into topics and issues that affect the hip hop community through the duo's political view, such as the public education system, racism, freedom of speech and police brutality. Let's Get Free exposes stories such as Fred Hampton Jr having the possibility of being framed and both members relationship with Christianity.

== Recording and production ==
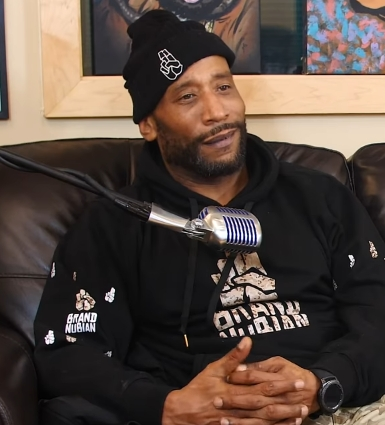
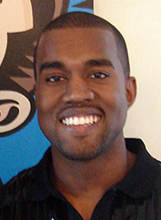
Lord Jamar and Kanye West contributed to the production of the album

Let's Get Free is mainly produced by dead prez, along with the help of producers Hedrush, Lord Jamar, and Kanye West.

=== Singles ===
The opening track of Let's Get Free, "Wolves", is centered around an metaphor by Uhuru Movement’s Chairman Omali Yeshitela related to white people distributing crack in the black community to hunters in the Arctic fooling wolves into cutting themselves and, subsequently, bleeding themselves to death. This metaphor explains how life under capitalism and white supremacy has engulfed the Black community in self-destructive cycles, and asks us to turn our attention to our true adversary, "the oppressor."

The second track, "I'm a African", embraces a clear truth that should be apparent, but through American conditioning, it is often lost in the mind of Black folks whose family lines have resided in America for generations. M-1's verse starts with, "No, I wasn't born in Ghana, but Africa is my momma," and the rest of the song is a tribute to enslaved Africans of the past and freedom fighters such as South African anti-apartheid activist Steve Biko.

Following "I'm a African", "They Schools" discusses the ways in which schools "reify the status quo, perpetuating social, state, and governmental control" and "ultimately providing lackluster education to inner city youth." The song is appropriately named to signal that public schools "belong to the government and not the people." This track encourages Black people to take control of their communities and schools as a step towards achieving true freedom.

The fourth and most well-known track, "Hip-Hop", served as the opening music for Chappelle's Show (the instrumental version was used). The next track, "Police State", peeks into the situation of mass incarceration of Black men partly due to social and economic disadvantages.

"Be Healthy", a mellow Spanish-guitar-driven song which is centered around the morals of veganism and the consequences of industrialized diets.

One of the duo's most recognizable songs, "It's Bigger Than Hip-Hop", provides a critical view of the commodification of hip hop artists and music. The song exposes the government for its treatment of working-class people while at the same time, critiquing the way that the hip hop music industry "respect money over talent" and that "real music scares people."

== Artwork ==
The cover art of the album depicts an open call for armed revolution by aligning "contemporary, capitalist, repressive America with colonial-era Africa in the form of an armed village preparing to strike," as stated by The Guardian. Consequently, the cover was censored in many outlets across the United States.

== Critical reception ==
Professional ratings
Review scores
Source	Rating
AllMusic	4.5/5 stars
Chicago Sun-Times	4/4 stars
Entertainment Weekly	B
NME	7/10
Pitchfork	8.2/10
Rolling Stone	4/5 stars
The Rolling Stone Album Guide	4/5 stars
The Source	3.5/5 stars

Although the production was derided by some critics as a "dull musical backdrop" (such as Dave Heaton from PopMatters), Pound wrote that Let's Get Free was called a "return to politically conscious rap." Rolling Stone gave the album four stars and lauded its equation of "classrooms with jail cells, the projects with killing fields and everything from water to television with conduits for brainwashing by the system". Rawiya Kameir from Pitchfork wrote that "Let’s Get Free wasn't built around the aesthetics of consciousness—like some of their incense-lighting, kufi-wearing peers in the late-'90s "conscious-rap" boom [...] but around the politics of liberation."

Cassie Balfour for The Michigan Daily was impressed by the album, quoting "the group's militancy, unapologetic anger and complete rejection of the commercialism — not just of hip hop (which is just a symptom of something deeper) but of American culture in general." Balfour would go on to state that "Dead Prez still isn’t to a lot of people’s tastes, and many would accuse the group of advocating violence. But I would argue that’s a superficial take on Let’s Get Free." Some reviewers were notably critical of the album, such as Andy Capper for NME stating that the album "sometimes [get] a little too po-faced for its own good." and tracks "like 'Mind Sex' and 'Be Healthy', while worthy in sentiment, lack the musical invention or lyrical dexterity to match the message."

== Legacy ==
During an interview with the Juan EP Is Dead podcast, Stic.man revealed that Nipsey Hussle told him that he "wanted to redo Let’s Get Free and wanted [dead prez's] permission" one year before he was murdered.

== Track listing ==
No.	Title	Producer(s)	Length
1.	"Wolves" (Chairman Omali Yeshitela)	dead prez	2:16
2.	"I'm a African" (additional vocals by Indo and Abu)	Hedrush & dead prez	3:19
3.	"'They' Schools" (chorus vocals by Keanna Henson)	Hedrush & dead prez	5:06
4.	"Hip-Hop"	Hedrush & dead prez	3:33
5.	"Police State" (opening vocals by Chairman Omali Yeshitela)	Hedrush & dead prez	3:40
6.	"Behind Enemy Lines" (phone calls by Ness, Toya and Divine)	Hedrush & dead prez	3:03
7.	"Assassination"	Lord Jamar & dead prez	2:01
8.	"Mind Sex" (additional vocals by Umi, Becca Byram, poem by Abiodun Oyewole)	dead prez	4:51
9.	"We Want Freedom" (additional vocals from "The Spook Who Sat by the Door")	Hedrush & dead prez	4:33
10.	"Be Healthy" (additional vocals by Prodigy)	Hedrush & dead prez	2:34
11.	"Discipline" (phone call by Dedan and Nimrod)	dead prez	1:37
12.	"Psychology" (additional vocals by True Image, poem read by Umi)	Lord Jamar & dead prez	5:56
13.	"Happiness"	Lord Jamar & dead prez	3:48
14.	"Animal in Man"	dead prez	4:31
15.	"You'll Find a Way"	dead prez	3:13
16.	"It's Bigger Than Hip-Hop" (featuring Tahir and People's Army)	Kanye West & dead prez	3:55
17.	"Propaganda" (additional vocals by Becca Byram, ending vocals by Huey Newton)	Lord Jamar & dead prez	5:14
18.	"The Pistol" (featuring Maintain of Illegal Tendencies)	Lord Jamar & dead prez	4:27

On the CD release, Propaganda and The Pistol are tracks 44 and 45 respectively. Tracks 17 through 43 contain four seconds of silence.

== Personnel ==
- stic.man – lead vocals, production, executive producer, art direction
- M-1 – lead vocals, production, executive producer, art direction
- Hedrush – production, drum programming
- Lord Jamar – production
- Kanye West – production
- Tahir (of Hedrush) – vocals
- Maintain (of Illegal Tendencies) – vocals
- Indo (of People's Army) – additional vocals
- Abu (of People's Army) – additional vocals
- Keanna Henson – additional vocals
- Ness (of A-Alikes) – additional vocals
- Toya (of People's Army) – additional vocals
- Divine (of People's Army) – additional vocals
- Umi – additional vocals
- Becca Byram – additional vocals, keyboards
- Abiodun Oyewole (of The Last Poets) – additional vocals
- Prodigy (of Mobb Deep) – additional vocals
- Dedan (of Illegal Tendencies) – additional vocals
- Nimrod (of Illegal Tendencies) – additional vocals
- True Image – additional vocals
- Mark Batson – keyboards
- Christos Tsantilios – recording, mixing
- Blair Wells – recording
- Nastee – recording
- Doug Wilson – mixing
- Bernard Grubman – guitar
- Pressure of Fambase – keyboards
- Melvin Gibbs – bass
- Laura J. Seaton-Finn – strings
- Joshua – horns
- Mista Sinista (of The X-Ecutioners) – scratching
- Sean Cane – drums, executive producer
- Matt Life – executive producer
- Schott Free – executive producer
- Stuart "Kamau" Lyle – cover concept
- Kerry DeBruce – art direction, design
- Lorraine West – illustration
- Anthony Cutajar – album photography
- Saba – road photography
- Corbis – archival images

== Charts ==
=== Album ===
Chart (2000)	Peak position
US Billboard 200	73
US Top R&B/Hip-Hop Albums (Billboard)	22

=== Singles ===
Title	Year	Chart positions
Title	Year	US Rap
"Hip-Hop"	1999	49
"It's Bigger Than Hip-Hop"	2000	43

== See also ==
- 2000 in hip-hop
- Dead Prez discography
- The Ecstatic

== Work cited ==
Secondary sources

- Burney, Lawrence (February 10, 2025). "Rediscovered: Dead Prez, 'Let's Get Free'". Okayplayer.
- Belle, Crystal (2014). "From Jay-Z to Dead Prez: Examining Representations of Black Masculinity in Mainstream Versus Underground Hip-Hop Music". Journal of Black Studies. 45 (4): 287–300. doi:10.1177/0021934714528953. JSTOR 24572849.
