= Soldier 2 Soldier =

Studio album by stic.man and Young Noble
- Released: October 3, 2006
- Recorded: 2006
- Genre: Hip hop
- Label: Real Talk Entertainment
- Producer: Derrick "Sac" Johnson (exec.); Big Hollis; Brotha Ben; Maximillion; Vince V.

stic.man chronology
Soldier 2 Soldier (2006)	Manhood (2007)

Young Noble chronology
Against All Oddz (2006)	Soldier 2 Soldier (2006)	Thug in Thug Out (2007)

Professional ratings
Review scores
Source	Rating
AllMusic	3/5 stars

Soldier 2 Soldier is a collaborative studio album by rappers stic.man and Young Noble. It was released on October 3, 2006.

In early 2006, the political, sometimes militant, Dead Prez member stic.man and Outlawz's Young Noble collaborated to make Soldier 2 Soldier. The relationship between the two groups worked well enough that they decided to work on another record, as Dead Prez and Outlawz – Can't Sell Dope Forever. The theme of war is prevalent throughout the album, which opens and closes with a "Soldiers Prayer," but it is directed towards the struggles in the U.S., as opposed to those abroad.

== Track listing ==
No.	Title	Length
1.	"Soldiers Prayer AM"	2:01
2.	"Runaway Slave"	4:08
3.	"Young Black and Just Don't Give A..."	3:45
4.	"How U Like That"	4:25
5.	"Jewels"	0:48
6.	"Daddy Loves You"	4:40
7.	"Soul Music"	4:38
8.	"Tryin' 2 Make a Livin'"	4:49
9.	"Time"	4:18
10.	"4 Life"	5:52
11.	"Smoke wit Me"	0:17
12.	"Kali4nya"	4:21
13.	"Like a Soldier wit It"	3:25
14.	"Soldier's Prayer PM"	2:51
Total length:		50:18

Amazon bonus tracks
No.	Title	Length
15.	"Outlaw Pride"	4:39
16.	"Leave the Past Behind"	5:10
