= The 49ers =

American hip hop group

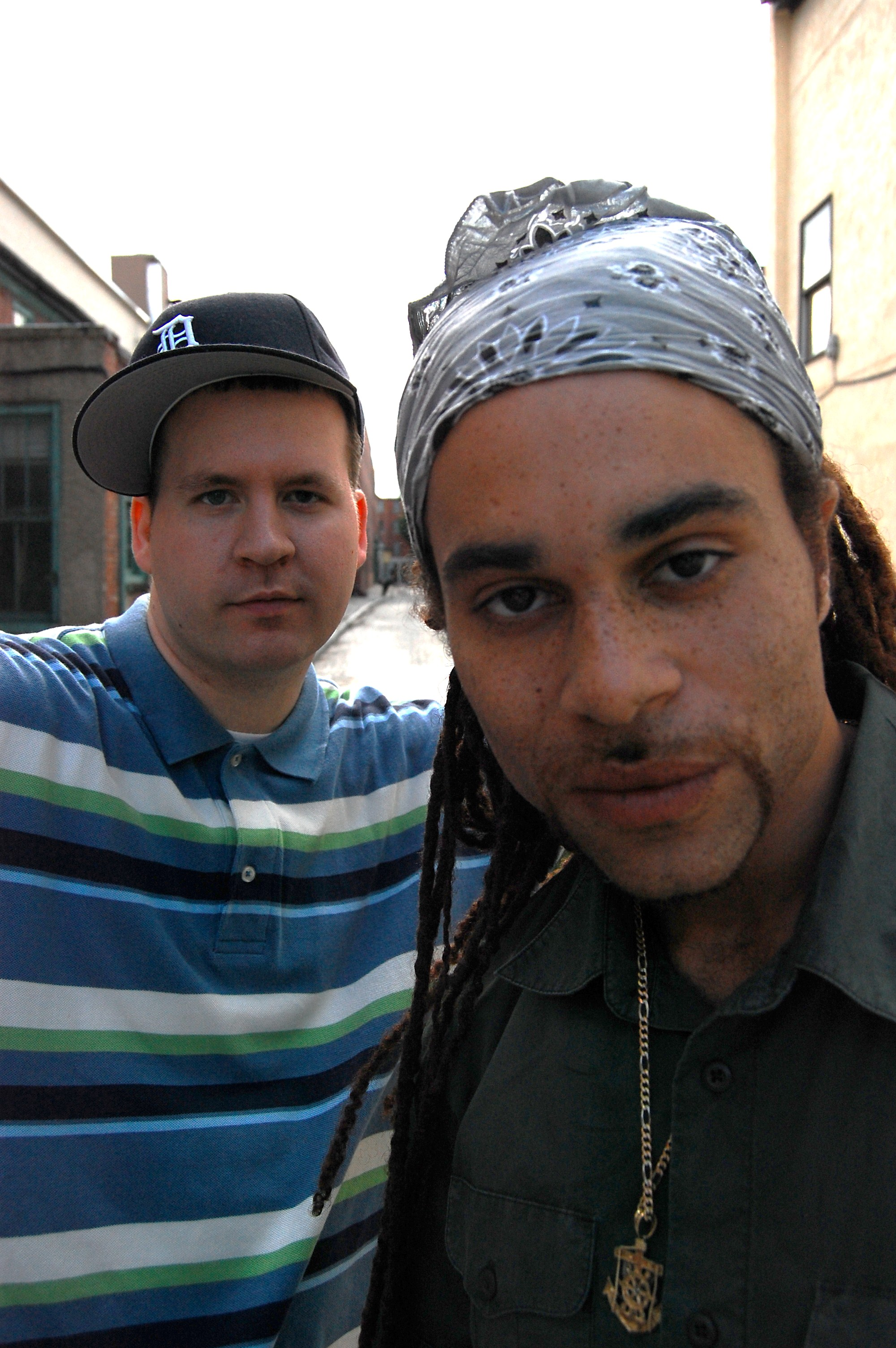
- Jas Mace & Marchitect (2009).

Background information
- Origin: Newark, Delaware, United States
- Genres: Hip hop
- Years active: 1995–present
- Labels: Goon Trax, Libyus, P-Vine
- Members: Jas Mace; Marchitect
- Website: the49ers.wordpress.com

The 49ers is a hip-hop duo from Newark, Delaware and consists of members Jas Mace and Marchitect. They were also the focal members of another hip-hop group called The Outfit. The 49ers are known for their laid-back, jazzy, and soulful hip-hop music.

== History ==
=== The Outfit ===
Jas Mace and Marchitect were introduced to each other through little league baseball in their hometown of Newark, Delaware. It was later realized that the two shared more than just a passion for sports, but also for hip-hop music. They began writing raps and recording music at Marchitect's house, which is also where their group's name was created. The origin of the name is the street address of where the two emcees honed their production and emceeing skills.

Marchitect's older brother, Grouchy Greg Watkins co-CEO of AllHipHop.com, organized a group called The Outfit. The Outfit released three 12" singles and a full-length album on Oblique Recordings, a label that was also created by Grouchy Greg Watkins. The first 12" was released in 1995 and featured "Beauty of the Week" b/w "3 Mics, 2 Marks, and 1 Jas." In 1997, The Outfit released their second 12" that featured the songs "Why I Don't Know"/"Day In, Night Out" b/w "The Outfit Presents"/"Rise and Shine." Their final 12" release was in 1999 and featured the singles "Outta Sight" b/w "The Telephone." The 49ers were featured on all three of these releases. In 1999, The Outfit finally released their first and only full-length album called The Soundtrack to Life.

=== The 49ers ===
The members of The Outfit eventually went their separate ways, but The 49ers continued recording. In 2007, they released their first full-length album called Equilibrium. The underground success of this album caught the ears of the Japanese record label Goon Trax, a subsidiary music label of Media Factory. This led to their first Goon Trax album called State of the Art. The album included few new songs from The 49ers, and consisted mostly of previously released songs from The Soundtrack to Life and Equilibrium. Included on the album was the 12" single that featured the songs "Breath of Fresh Air", "Champagne", and "Music." The 12" single also included a remix of "Breath of Fresh Air" that was produced by DJ Chika of Cradle Orchestra. In 2009, Goon Trax released The 49ers' second album in Japan called The Ultrasound.

After two albums on Goon Trax, in 2011 The 49ers decided to move in another direction splitting with the label and releasing their 4th album called Musaic, this time on Libyus Music. The album's title is a play on two words: Music and Mosaic. According to their website, The 49ers "wanted all the songs to have their own flavor and color, but to come together and make a complete picture. Like a musical mosaic, hence Musaic." In the same year, The 49ers also released a collaboration album with the Japanese production unit ZDW!? (Zaa Dee Woo!?) called Soulstice. The album featured various concepts and instruments providing a unique blend of both American and Japanese flavor. Not wasting much time, a year later in 2012, The 49ers sought the help of P-Vine Records to release their 5th album in Japan called The World Record. Staying true to their goal of spreading authentic Hip-Hop throughout the world, the album features many producers and artists from Korea, Japan, France, United States, England, Jamaica, New Zealand, Taiwan, Australia, and Poland. Featured on the album are platinum selling America Hip-Hop artist Positive K and the Japanese Hip-Hop group Samurai Troops aka SMRYTRPS.

In 2006, The 49ers were featured in, and produced the Portobello Film Festival award-winning documentary Guilty or Innocent of Using the N Word. Since 2007, The 49ers have been featured on many albums and compilations released in Japan. Their most successful release is titled "Imagine" and was featured on Re:plus' album called Everlasting Truth. In 2013, The 49ers and Tribeca provided the rapping vocals for "Never Say Never", the opening theme of the Japanese anime series, Danganronpa: The Animation. In 2015, SoulChef and Jas Mace of The 49ers provided music for a Sonos television advert that was narrated by A Tribe Called Quest's Q-Tip. The song is called "We Gon Turn It Out" and was originally released on SoulChef's Here and Now album. The 49ers' provided a song for episode #38 of Japan's Netflix Original Series called Terrace House. The episode aired on July 19, 2016, and the song featured was "Dope Emcee," originally released on the World Record album.

== Discography ==
=== The Outfit ===
- (1999) 12" Outta Sight b/w The Telephone
- (1999) The Soundtrack to Life
- (1997) 12" Why I Don't Know/Day In, Night Out b/w The Outfit Presents/Rise and Shine
- (1995) 12" Beauty of the Week b/w 3 Mics, 2 Marks, and 1 Jas

=== The 49ers ===
- (2013) Marchitect x Dr. Drumah - World Wide Vibe
- (2012) The World Record
- (2012) Marchitect x Soulchef - Passport
- (2011) The 49ers x ZDW!? - Soulstice
- (2011) Musaic
- (2009) The Ultrasound
- (2006) Equilibrium
- (2006) State of the Art
- (2006) 12" Breath of Fresh Air b/w Champagne / Music
- (2005) Marchitect – Fresh Out the Lab

=== Features and compilations ===
- (2015) SoulChef - Good Vibes
  - "The Picture"
- (2015) Banvox - At The Moment
  - "Wild"
- (2015) Mono Creation - Colors of Life
  - "Music Plays On (Remix)"
- (2014) 2mo'key - Pieces of the World
  - "We Got Soul"
  - "Backwords"
- (2014) Hangman - Healin’ in the City Night – Moon River
  - "One More Chance"
- (2014) Poldoore - Heard It All Before (The Remixes)
  - "Heard It All Before"
- (2014) A. June & J. Beat - A. June & J. Beat
  - "Hard2Get"
- (2014) Poldoore - The Day Off
  - "Heard It All Before"
- (2013) A. June & J. Beat - Dreamer
  - "Hard2Get (Midnight Blue Version)"
- (2013) Illusionist - The Uplift
  - "Fresh Rhymes"
- (2013) Avens - Art of Peace
  - "Done Me Wrong"
  - "The Present"
  - "Art of Peace"
- (2013) SoulChef - Classics
  - "Franki Valli"
  - "Blind Man See"
- (2013) Yeiv - Remember June
  - "Let It Marinate"
- (2013) V.A. - Danganronpa: The Animation Soundtrack
  - "Never Say Never"
- (2013) Aosaki - Night, Sky, Snow, Wind
  - "Can't Stop Now"
  - "傲骨"
- (2013) Otokaze - Save the Flavor
  - "Dedication"
  - "City Lights, City Nights"
  - "夏恋"
- (2013) The Presidents - We are the Presidents
  - "Hip Hop Music"
- (2013) Cult Classic Records - Friends & Family 2
  - "Evergreen"
  - "Got That"
- (2013) BLEE - BLEE Project
  - "Guilty by Association"
- (2013) White Rain - Love, Live, Life
  - "Exodus"
  - "Close to You"
  - "Dreamlike"
- (2013) Noha Beats - Kosmos
  - "The Recipe (Remix)"
- (2013) Link6 - Hard 2 Get (Single)
  - "Hard 2 Get"
- (2013) Rice Master Yen - Rice Collaborations
  - "Daily"
  - "K.R.E.A.M"
  - "Latest Dances"
- (2013) Formo Sir - Music Talk
  - "Music Talk"
- (2013) Ninety One - Golden Years
  - "Don't Push Me"
  - "Everybody Knows"
- (2012) Volta Masters - Funkin' for Jamaica (Single)
  - "Funkin' for Jamaica"
- (2012) Yeiv - Immersion
  - "Skydiving"
- (2012) Sounguage - Art Noise
  - "I Want You"
- (2012) Thomas Prime - The Night and Day
  - "One of these Days"
- (2012) Senpai - Son of my Father
  - "War"
- (2012) Senpai - They Say Just Wait til the Morning
  - "Do You"
- (2012) Ninety One - Short Nights
  - "Changing Laymen"
- (2012) Tokyo Mic Jamz - Un:unplugged
  - "Still Shinin'"
- (2012) Blazo - Reflections
  - "Doc Ellis"
  - "Pressure"
- (2012) Volta Masters - At Work3
  - "Don't Stop the Music"
- (2011) Soul Chef - Here and Now
  - "We Gon Turn it Out"
- (2011) SL of Repeat Offenders - Digital Throwback
  - "World Go Round"
- (2011) Avens - Surrounding Reality
  - "Surrounding Reality"
- (2011) Laidbook - Laidbook12 Different Cities, Different Expressions
  - "Whatchutalkinbout"
- (2011) Blazo - Colors of Jazz
  - "Doc Ellis"
- (2011) Blue Bottle Records - A New Dawn
  - "Sunshine"
  - "H2O V.2"
  - "Superhero"
- (2011) Kondor - Peace of Soul
  - "A New Day"
- (2011) V.A. - In Ya Mellow Tone 6
  - "Music Plays On"
- (2011) Inherit - Pledge to the Music
  - "Midnight Mirage"
- (2011) Thomas Prime – Waiting for Tomorrow
  - "Music Plays On"
  - "International Night"
  - "Iron Mask"
- (2011) Seasons’ End – Moments in Life
  - "Running on Karma"
  - "One of Those Days"
- (2010) V.A. - Digi Jazz Chill City Vol. 1
  - "Crazy"
- (2010) Nicholas Wonder – My Thesis
  - "Good Feeling"
- (2010) Vans Cal – Miedlev
  - "Now & Then"
- (2010) SoulChef – Escapism
  - "Wanted"
  - "Blind Man See"
  - "Franki Valli"
- (2010) SoulChef – Remember When
  - "K.M.A."
- (2010) DJ Ezasscul – Jazz Meditation
  - "Time Passes"
- (2010) V.A. – In Ya Mellow Tone 5
  - "Running Out Of Time"
- (2010) Am 7- Am 7
  - "Money Talks"
  - "Imagine (Remix)"
- (2010) Navid B – Subtle Waters
  - "H2O"
- (2010) Kondor – Peace of Body
  - "Four Corners"
- (2010) Incise – Daily Methods
  - "Running Out of Time
- (2010) Elfer - Hip-Hop’s Taking Over My Mind b/w What Ya Life Like?
  - "Hip-Hop's Taking Over My Mind"
  - "What Ya Life Like?"
- (2010) V.A. – Jazz City Series
  - "Something New"
- (2010) Re:plus – Everlasting Truth
  - "Imagine"
- (2010) V.A. – In Ya Mellow Tone 4
  - "My Girlfriend's Best Friend"
- (2009) Think Twice & David Ryshpan – Jazz Carnival
  - "Bye-Bye"
  - "Get Away"
  - "When The Smoke Clears"
- (2009) DJ Motora – Ill Communication
  - "88 Ways to Die"
- (2009) V.A. – In Ya Mellow Tone Official Bootleg Vol. 1 Mixed by Re: Plus
  - "Imagine"
  - "It's My Thing"
  - "Music"
  - "Sophisticated Freaks"
- (2009) V.A. – In Ya Mellow Tone Official Bootleg Vol. 2 Mixed By Robert de Boron
  - "In Love With Two Women"
  - "Promise Me"
  - "Universal Language"
- (2009) V.A. – In Ya Mellow Tone 3
  - "In Love With Two Women"
- (2009) V.A. – In Ya Mellow Tone 2.5
  - "Traveling Man"
  - "I Don't Want No"
- (2009) Stilla-mode – Lovexperience
  - "Far East, Far West"
- (2008) V.A. – In Ya Mellow Tone 2
  - "Half Drunk"
- (2008) V.A. – In Your Mellow Tone
  - "Champagne"
- (2008) 12" Inherit – Up The River
  - "Traveling Man"
- (2008) Incise – Nobody’s Story
  - "Move Rhymes"
  - "In Love With Two Women"
- (2008) 12" Incise – Scorpion Tail
  - "In Love With Two Women"
- (2008) Cradle Orchestra – Magical Journey
  - "Champagne"
  - "Music"
  - "Breath of Fresh Air"
- (2008) Think Twice – Rock to this Beat
  - "They Don't Know"
- (2008) South Hill Productions – Soul Session Vol. 2
  - "Running Up"
- (2007) V.A. – Jazz Flava Lesson 2 Mixed by DJ 411
  - "Champagne"

== Accomplishments ==
- 2016 The 49ers' song "Dope Emcee" was featured on a Netflix Original Series called Terrace House.
- 2015 Jas Mace of The 49ers was featured on the Sonos television advert which was narrated by A Tribe Called Quest's Q-Tip.
- 2015 The 49ers along with Banvox performed at Japan's largest music festival called Fuji Rock.
- 2013 The 49ers were featured on the opening theme song for the Japanese anime series, Danganronpa: The Animation.
- 2007 The 49ers were voted as Delaware's best hip-hop group in Out & About Magazine
- 2006 The 49ers were featured in Allhiphop.com's breeding ground showcase
- 2006 The 49ers were featured in and produced the award-winning documentary Guilty or Innocent of Using the N Word
