= Can't Sell Dope Forever =

Mixtape by dead prez and Outlawz
- Released: July 25, 2006
- Genre: Hip-hop
- Length: 39:20
- Label: Affluent Records
- Producer: Chuck P; Eddie Coldfingers; E.D.I. Mean; M-1; New Muzik; stic.man; Tai Rotan

dead prez chronology
Get Free or Die Tryin' (Turn off the Radio, Vol. 2) (2003)	Can't Sell Dope Forever (2006)	Pulse of the People (Turn off the Radio, Vol. 3) (2009)

Outlawz chronology
Outlaw 4 Life: 2005 A.P. (2005)	Can't Sell Dope Forever (2006)	We Want In: The Street LP (2008)

Professional ratings
Review scores
Source	Rating
AllMusic	3.5/5 stars
IGN	7.7/10
PopMatters	7/10
RapReviews	8.5/10
XXL	2/5 (M)

Can't Sell Dope Forever is a collaborative mixtape by American hip hop groups dead prez and Outlawz. It was released in 2006 through Affluent Records. Production was handled by both of dead prez members stic.man and M-1, and Outlawz member E.D.I. Mean, as well as Chuck P, Eddie Coldfingers, New Muzik and Tai Rotan. It features guest appearances from Chae, Erica Fox, Layzie Bone, Malachi, Messy Marv, Scott Lo, and stic.man's mother Ms. Nora. The album did not reach the Billboard 200, however, it peaked at number 99 on the Top R&B/Hip-Hop Albums chart in the United States.

== Track listing ==
No.	Title	Producer(s)	Length
1.	"Intro"		0:04
2.	"1nation" (featuring Stormey)	stic.man	2:43
3.	"Can't Sell Dope Forever" (featuring Stormey)	E.D.I. Mean	4:01
4.	"Like a Window"	stic.man	4:05
5.	"Surroundings" (Skit)		0:17
6.	"Thuggin' on the Blokkk" (featuring Stormey)	E.D.I. Mean	4:16
7.	"U Ain't the Only 1" (featuring Messy Marv)	M-1	4:46
8.	"Searchin'" (featuring Stormey, Scott Lo and Erica Fox)	Chuck P; Eddie Coldfingers	4:09
9.	"Dedication" (Skit)		0:07
10.	"Fork in the Road" (featuring Stormey and Malachi)	E.D.I. Mean; New Muzik	4:24
11.	"Believe" (featuring Ms. Nora)	stic.man	2:52
12.	"WRBG" (Skit)		0:05
13.	"Holdin' On" (featuring Chae and Stormey)	stic.man	4:17
14.	"Came-Up" (featuring Layzie Bone)	Tai Rotan	3:14
Total length:			39:20

== Charts ==
Chart (2006)	Peak position
US Top R&B/Hip-Hop Albums (Billboard)	99
