= The Rose That Grew from Concrete =

Studio album by various
- Released: November 21, 2000
- Recorded: 1994–95
- Genres: Hip hop; hip hop soul; spoken word
- Length: 1:10:46
- Labels: Amaru; Interscope

Professional ratings
Review scores
Source	Rating
AllMusic	2/5 stars
Entertainment Weekly	A−
NME	(8/10)
Q	3/5 stars
RapReviews.com	(7/10)
Rolling Stone	3/5 stars
The Rolling Stone Album Guide	2/5 stars

The Rose That Grew from Concrete is a posthumous album based on the poetry/writings of Tupac Shakur, released on November 21, 2000. This album features a large cast of celebrities reading Shakur's poetry and writing, much in the spirit of a traditional spoken-word album. 2Pac is featured on the song "The Rose That Grew from Concrete". These vocals were remixed onto the track from the song "Mama's Just a Little Girl" that was recorded in 1996 and released in 2002 on the album "Better Dayz".

It sold 262,672 copies in the United States as of 2011.

== Track listing ==
No.	Title	Length
1.	"Interlude"	0:57
2.	"Wake Me When I'm Free" (featuring Babatunde Olatunji)	5:52
3.	"Can U C the Pride in the Panther? (Male Version)" (featuring Mos Def)	2:57
4.	"When URE Heart Turns Cold" (featuring Sonia Sanchez)	1:38
5.	"U R Ripping Us Apart!!!" (featuring dead prez)	3:04
6.	"Tears of a Teenage Mother" (featuring Jasmine Guy)	0:39
7.	"God" (featuring Reverend Run)	0:47
8.	"And Still I Love You" (featuring Red Rat)	3:03
9.	"Can U C the Pride in the Panther? (Female Version)" (featuring Mos Def)	4:54
10.	"If There Be Pain" (featuring Providence & RasDaveed El Harar)	4:32
11.	"A River That Flows Forever" (featuring Danny Glover, Afeni Shakur and The Cast of The Lion King)	2:20
12.	"The Rose That Grew from Concrete" (featuring Nikki Giovanni)	2:35
13.	"In The Event of My Demise" (featuring Outlawz and Geronimo Ji Jaga)	4:41
14.	"What of a Love Unspoken" (featuring Tre' from Pharcyde)	3:16
15.	"Sometimes I Cry" (featuring Dan Rockett)	3:10
16.	"The Fear in the Heart of a Man" (featuring Q-Tip)	4:16
17.	"Starry Night" (featuring Quincy Jones & Mac Mall)	4:33
18.	"What of Fame?" (featuring Russell Simmons)	0:21
19.	"Only 4 the Righteous" (featuring Rha Goddess)	2:29
20.	"Why Must You Be Unfaithful?" (featuring Sarah Jones)	1:12
21.	"Wife 4 Life" (featuring 4th Avenue Jones and K-Ci)	4:06
22.	"Lady Liberty Needs Glasses" (featuring Malcolm-Jamal Warner)	2:23
23.	"Family Tree" (featuring Lamar Antwon Robinson and The IMPACT Repertory Theatre Group)	3:21
24.	"Thug Blues" (featuring Lamar Antwon Robinson, Tina Thomas Bayyan and The IMPACT Repertory Theatre Group)	4:46
25.	"The Sun and the Moon" (featuring Chief Okena Littlehawk)	1:56

== Charts ==
Chart	Peak position
U.S. Billboard 200	89
U.S. Billboard Top R&B/Hip Hop Albums	28

== Personnel ==
- Jamal Joseph — Producer
- Tevin Thomas — Co-Producer, Keyboards on "God", " Only 4 the Righteous"
- Mike Mingioni — Engineer, Cover Photo, Liner Notes, Executive Producer, Bass, Vocals on "Wake Me When I'm Free"
- Molly Monjauze — Executive Producer
- Herbert Leonard — Percussion
- Gloria Cox — Executive Producer
- Russell Simmons — Performer
- Atiba Wilson — Flute
- Mos Def - Performer
- Tim Izo Orindgreff — Flute
- Dead Prez - Performer
- Royal Bayyan — Guitar & Keyboards
- Tarik Bayyan — Producer & Engineer
- Jasmine Guy - Performer
- Sonia Sanchez — Liner Notes
- QD3 - Performer
- Brian Gardner — Mastering
- Danny Glover - Performer
- Taavi Mote — Mixing
- Red Rat — Producer
- Skip Saylor — Mixing
- TuPac — Vocals
- Chris Puram — Mixing
- Nefertiti — Vocals (Background)
- Claudio Cueni — Mixing
- Val Young — Vocals (Background)
- Atiba Wilson — Percussion
- Tom Whalley — A&R
- Sikiru Adepoju — Performer
- Juan Ramirez — Assistant Engineer
- Sarah Jones — Performer
- Malcolm-Jamal Warner — Bass
- Jeffery Newbury — Photography
- Claudio Cueni — Engineer
- Voza Rivers — Producer
- Brian Springer — Engineer
- Thomas R. Yezzi — Engineer
- Khalis Bayyan — Saxophone
- Tyson Leeper — Engineer
- Charles Mack — Vocals (Background)
- Duncan Aldrich — Engineer
- Nikki Giovanni — Vocals
- Noelle Scaggs — Liner Notes, Vocals on "If There Be Pain"
- Q-Tip — Performer
- Tre Hardson — Performer
- Erik Rico — Producer
