= RBG: Revolutionary but Gangsta =

Studio album by dead prez
- Released: March 30, 2004
- Recorded: 2000–2002
- Studios: Warrior Studios (Brooklyn, NY); Streetlight Studios (New York, NY); Chung King Studios (New York, NY)
- Genres: Political hip hop; gangsta rap
- Labels: Columbia; Sony
- Producers: dead prez; Downbeat Production Collective; Sean C; Tahir

Dead prez chronology
Let's Get Free (2000)	RBG: Revolutionary but Gangsta (2004)	Information Age (2012)

Singles from RBG: Revolutionary but Gangsta
- 1. "Hell Yeah" Released: 2003

Professional ratings
Review scores
Source	Rating
AllMusic	3/5 stars
Now	2/5
RapReviews	7/10
Rolling Stone	3/5 stars
(The New) Rolling Stone Album Guide	2.5/5 stars
Spin	A−
Stylus Magazine	C

RBG: Revolutionary but Gangsta is the second studio album by American conscious hip hop duo dead prez. It was released on March 30, 2004, through Columbia Records and Sony Urban Music. The recording sessions took place at Warrior Studios in Brooklyn, and Chung King Studios and Street Light Studios in New York, between 2000 and 2002. The album was produced by Downbeat Production Collective, Sean C, Tahir, and dead prez. It features guest appearances from Krayzie Bone and Jay-Z.

The album debuted at number 60 on the Billboard 200 and number 14 on the Top R&B/Hip-Hop Albums in the United States, and number 40 on the UK Official Hip Hop and R&B Albums Chart.

== Background ==
RBG was described by member M-1 as a movement that "comes off the back of the Honorable Marcus Garvey". According to him, RBG means "Red, Black and Green", the traditional African colors created by the UNIA, which are featured on the album cover. With this album dead prez "made it Revolutionary But Gangsta".

On the album, dead prez talks about ending poverty, the mental illness of depression, reliance on the government but of "pimping the system" as a means to this end and to the cause of liberation. On "Hell Yeah", dead prez declares "Fuck welfare / we say reparations".

Inside the album liner notes, RBG is variously described as standing for: "revolutionary but gangsta", "real big guns", "real black girls", "ready to bust gats", "reaching bigger goals", "read 'bout Garvey", "rappers be gassed", "red black green", "rider's basic guide", and "rollin big ganja".

The song "Radio Freq" first appeared on Turn Off the Radio: The Mixtape Vol. 1 as "Turn Off the Radio" and is considered an homage to Ice Cube's song "Turn Off The Radio".

== Track listing ==
All tracks are written by Clayton Gavin and Lavonne Alford, except track 2 written with Anthony Henderson, and track 12 written with Shawn Carter.

No.	Title	Producer(s)	Length
1.	"Don't Forget Where U Came From"	stic.man	1:14
2.	"Walk Like a Warrior" (featuring Krayzie Bone)	stic.man	3:32
3.	"I Have a Dream, Too"	Tahir	4:00
4.	"D.O.W.N."	stic.man	2:07
5.	"Hell Yeah (Pimp the System)"	dead prez; Downbeat Production Collective; Sol Messiah (d); Metaphysics (d)	4:12
6.	"W-4"	stic.man	4:04
7.	"Radio Freq"	stic.man	2:51
8.	"Fucked Up"	stic.man	2:43
9.	"50 in the Clip"	Sean Cane; L.V. (co.)	2:42
10.	"Way of Life"	stic.man	2:57
11.	"Don't Forget Where U Goin'"	stic.man	2:05
12.	"Hell Yeah (Pimp the System) (Remix)" (featuring Jay-Z)	dead prez; Downbeat Production Collective; Sol Messiah (d); Metaphysics (d)	4:20
20.	"Twenty"		2:22
21.	"Hell Yeah (Rock Remix)"		5:06

Notes

- Tracks 13 to 19 consist of five seconds of silence each.
- Tracks 20 and 21 are hidden tracks.

== Personnel ==
- Clayton "stic.man" Gavin – vocals, producer (tracks: 1, 2, 4–8, 10–12), recording & mixing (tracks: 1, 11), executive producer, art direction, design
- Lavonne "M-1" Alford – vocals, producer (tracks: 5, 12), recording (tracks: 1, 5, 11, 12), mixing (tracks: 1, 11), executive producer, art direction, design
- Anthony "Krayzie Bone" Henderson – vocals (track 2)
- Blue – additional vocals (tracks: 5, 12)
- Aisha Mic – additional backing vocals (track 6)
- Derick Prosper – voice (track 7)
- Wu Hylton – voice (track 9)
- Shawn "Jay-Z" Carter – vocals (track 12)
- Tahir Jamal – bass (track 2), producer (track 3)
- Ed Goldson – bass guitar (tracks: 3, 6–10)
- Laurent "Tippie" Alfred – electric guitar (tracks: 5, 12)
- Gregory Jackson – bass guitar (tracks: 5, 12)
- Vijay Iyer – additional keyboards (tracks: 5, 12)
- Deleno "Sean Cane" Matthews – scratches (track 7), producer (track 9), executive producer
- Bernard Grobman – electric guitar (track 5,10,12)
- Ernest "Sol Messiah" Franklin – drum producer (tracks: 5, 12)
- Jamal "Metaphysics" Gordon – drum producer (tracks: 5, 12)
- Levar "LV" Coppin – co-producer (track 9)
- Bob Brown – recording (tracks: 2–4, 6, 9, 10)
- Doug Wilson – recording (track 3)
- Guru – recording (tracks: 4, 7)
- Abu – recording (track 8)
- G*Man – recording assistant (tracks: 2–4, 6)
- Brian Stanley – mixing (tracks: 2–4, 6, 7, 9, 10)
- Katherine Diehl – mixing (tracks: 2–4, 6, 7, 9, 10)
- Dave Dar – mixing (tracks: 5, 12)
- Apple Juice – mixing (track 8)
- Henny – mixing (track 8)
- James Cruz – mastering
- Chris Feldmann – art direction, design
- David Santana – graphics
- Oluwaseye Olusa – photography

== Charts ==
Chart (2004)	Peak position
UK R&B Albums (Official Charts)	40
US Billboard 200	60
US Top R&B/Hip-Hop Albums (Billboard)	14
