= Information Age (album) =

Studio album by dead prez
- Released: October 16, 2012
- Recorded: 2011–2012
- Genre: Conscious hip hop
- Length: 1:00:44
- Label: Krian Music Group; Boss Up Inc.; Sound Weapon
- Producer: Bonnot; Cylla; Dirk Pate; DJ Teknology; Kaykat; stic.man; TR!X; Ye-Yo

Dead prez chronology
RBG: Revolutionary but Gangsta (2004)	Information Age (2012)

Singles from Information Age
- 1. "Politrikkks" Released: November 4, 2008; 2. "No Way As the Way" Released: March 19, 2013

Professional ratings
Review scores
Source	Rating
AllMusic	3.5/5 stars
HipHopDX	3.5/5
Pitchfork	3.4/10
XXL	3/5

Information Age is the third studio album by American conscious hip hop duo dead prez. It was released through Krian Music Group digitally on October 16, 2012 and physically on January 29, 2013.

Production was handled by Dirk Pate, Bonnot, Trx, Cylla, DJ Teknology, Kaykat, Ye-Yo, and member stic.man, who also served as executive producer together with his groupmate M-1. It features guest appearances from Anthony David, Martian Luther, Trx, Umar Bin Hassan, Gaby Duran, Bun B and Reek da Villian.

== Track listing ==
Information Age Deluxe Edition
No.	Title	Writer(s)	Producer(s)	Length
1.	"Upload (Begin With)"	Clayton Gavin	stic.man	0:45
2.	"A New Beginning" (featuring Anthony David)	Gavin; Lavonne Alford	Dirk Pate	3:10
3.	"What If the Lights Go Out?"	Gavin; Alford	Dirk Pate	2:42
4.	"GHN: Global Hood News"	Alford	Bonnot	1:20
5.	"Dirty White Girl"	Gavin; Alford	Dirk Pate; stic.man (co.)	3:59
6.	"Intelligence Is Sexy" (featuring Gaby Duran)	Gavin; Alford	Cylla	3:46
7.	"No Way as the Way"	Gavin; Alford	Dirk Pate	3:55
8.	"Learning Growing Changing"	Gavin; Alford	DJ Teknology	4:21
9.	"Time Travel" (featuring TR!X)	Gavin; Alford; Kishan Patel	TR!X	4:41
10.	"Take Me to the Future" (featuring Martian Luther)	Gavin; Alford	Dirk Pate	4:43
11.	"GHN: Elections & Crisis"	Alford	Bonnot	1:07
12.	"The Awakening" (featuring Umar Bin Hassan)	Gavin; Gilbert Jerome Huling	stic.man	4:51
13.	"Overstand" (featuring Gaby Duran)	Gavin; Alford	Keykat	6:02
14.	"GHN: Wigs & Sports"	Alford	Bonnot	0:57
15.	"Scar Strangled Banner"	Gavin; Alford	stic.man	3:44
16.	"Time Travel Remix" (featuring Bun B and Reek da Villian)	Gavin; Alford; Patel	TR!X	5:57
17.	"Politrikkks"	Gavin; Alford	Ye-Yo	3:29
18.	"Download (Expand Beyond)"	Gavin	stic.man	1:15
Total length:				1:00:44

Notes

- Tracks 6, 13 to 17 are omitted from the standard edition.

== Personnel ==
- Clayton "stic.man" Gavin – vocals, producer (tracks: 1, 12, 15, 18), co-producer (track 5), executive producer, art design, A&R
- Lavonne "M-1" Alford – vocals, executive producer, A&R
- Anthony David – vocals (track 2)
- Gaby Duran – vocals (tracks: 6, 13)
- Kishan "Trx" Patel – vocals & producer (tracks: 9, 16)
- Martin Luther McCoy – vocals (track 10), additional guitar (track 5)
- Umar Bin Hassan – vocals (track 12)
- Bernard "Bun B" Freeman – vocals (track 16)
- Rico "Reek da Villian" Pleasant – vocals (track 16)
- Charlton "Chip" Williams – additional guitar (track 12), mixing
- Bilal Abdulsamad – additional flute (track 12)
- Mikuak Rai – additional keyboards (track 12)
- Dirk Evan Chapman Pate – producer (tracks: 2, 3, 5, 7, 10)
- Walter "Bonnot" Buonanno – producer (tracks: 4, 11, 14)
- Ayinde "Cylla" Thomas – producer (track 6)
- Benjamin "DJ Teknology" Cameron – producer (track 8)
- Keyon Harrold – producer (track 13)
- Yeyo – producer (track 17)
- TT Coles – photography

== Release history ==
Region	Date	Format(s)	Label	Edition(s)
United States	October 16, 2012	digital download	Krian Music Group, Boss Up Inc., Sound Weapon	Standard
United States	January 29, 2013	CD	Krian Music Group, Boss Up Inc., Sound Weapon	Deluxe
