= Stic.man =

stic.man
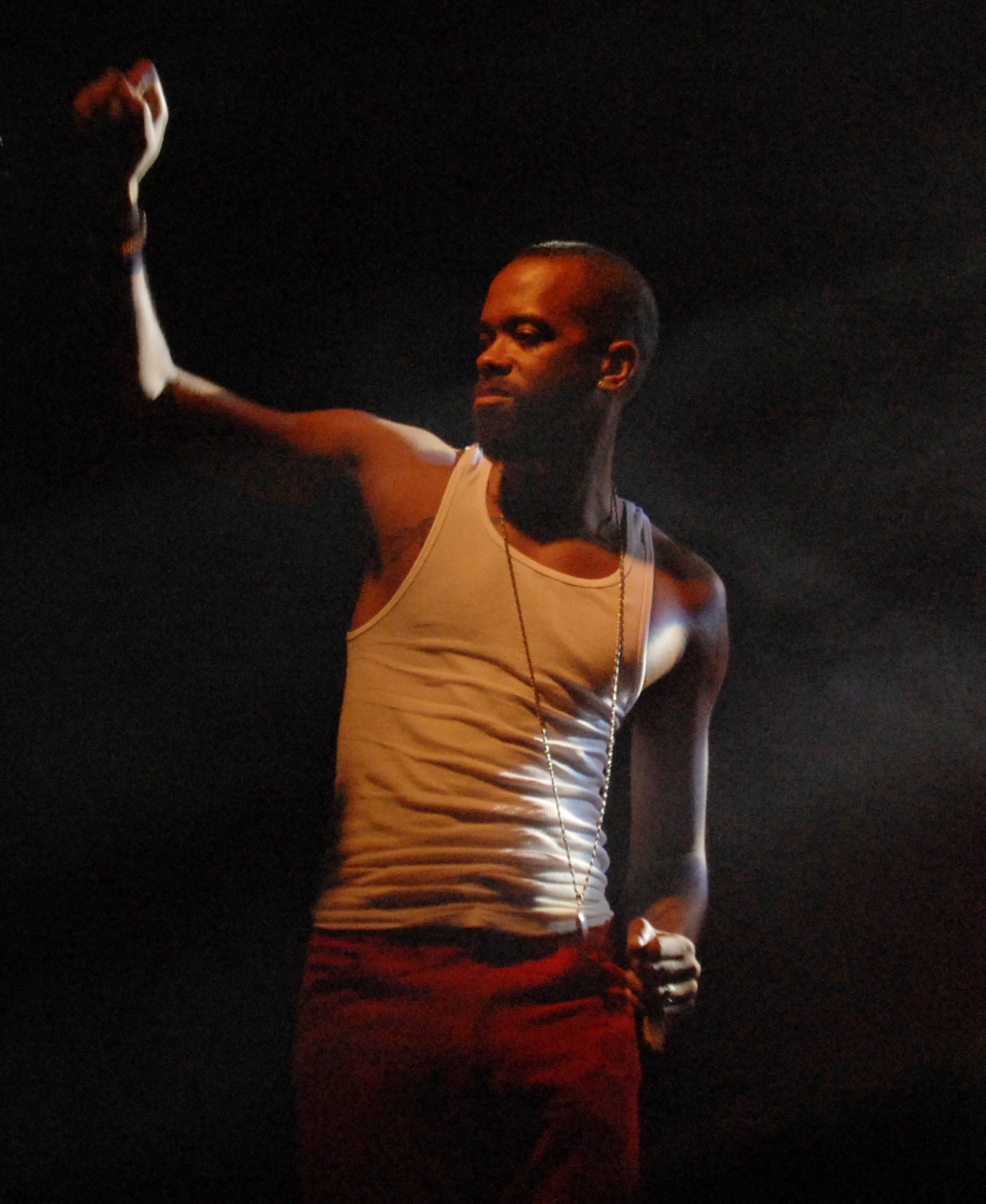
- stic.man with dead prez at Resistance Festival, Athens, 2009

Background information
- Also known as: Khnum Muata Ibomu; stic
- Born: Clayton Gavin; March 6, 1974 (age 52); Shadeville, Florida, U.S.
- Origin: Atlanta, Georgia, U.S.
- Genre: Hip hop
- Occupations: Rapper; author; producer
- Years active: 1996–present
- Labels: BossUp; Real Talk
- Member of: Dead Prez
- Website: rbgfitclub.com

Khnum Muata Ibomu (born Clayton Gavin, March 6, 1974), better known by his stage name stic.man and more recently as stic, is an American rapper, music producer, activist and author known for his work as one half of the political hip hop duo dead prez with M-1.

== Life and career ==
Khnum Muata Ibomu was born and raised in the rural unincorporated community of Shadeville. He studied at James S. Rickards and Wakulla High Schools.

In 1990, while in the 10th grade at Wakulla, Gavin was prevented from performing a rap song entitled "Black As I Can Get" for a Black History Month assembly. The incident prompted students to boycott classes following the assembly and led to a picket of the school joined by parents.

Following a diagnosis of gout when he was 21, stic.man stopped drinking and smoking, started practicing Jeet Kune Do and began following a vegan diet.

stic.man formed the hip-hop duo dead prez with M-1 after the two met at Florida A&M University. After a chance meeting with Brand Nubian's Lord Jamar at a Brooklyn block party, the two signed a recording deal with Loud Records, which in 2000 released Let's Get Free. The pair went on to release RBG: Revolutionary But Gangsta in 2004. stic.man was arrested at a Crown Heights photo shoot in 2003 after refusing to show identification to police officers. He and two others were arrested again at the O'Hare International Airport in 2004 for refusing to take off their headphones prior to takeoff.

In 2006 stic.man wrote two books. The first, entitled Warrior Names from Afrika, is a compilation of African warrior names and their meanings. His second book, The Art of Emceeing, is a 112-page resource that offers a step-by-step instructional guide on how to emcee, unique tips on voice healing and vocal health practices, and an explanation on many aspects of the hip hop industry, including terminology, styles, and business dealings. stic.man collaborated with Young Noble from Outlawz on their Soldier 2 Soldier album the same year.

stic.man also maintains Boss Up, Inc., an Atlanta-based music and entertainment company that offers information, music, and gear that reflects a sense of self-determination, creative consciousness, and entrepreneurship.

More recently stic.man has produced "Sly Fox", "Untitled" and "We're Not Alone" on Nas' album Untitled. He has also rapped on other artist's albums, such as Bizarre's Hannicap Circus. He is also featured on the song, "Angels & Demons" on Immortal Technique's compilation album, The Martyr, along with dead prez counterpart M-1.

== Personal life ==
Khnum "stic" Ibomu has two sons and was previously married to nutritionist and author Afya Ibomu. Ibomu announced via instagram that the two had divorced in 2022.

== Discography ==
Solo albums

- Manhood (2007)
- The Workout (2011)
- Workout II (2020)

Collaboration albums

- Soldier 2 Soldier (2006) (with Young Noble)
- Integrity (2025) (with Young Noble)

== Film appearances ==
Ibomu appears in the 2008 film The Black Candle, directed by M. K. Asante Jr. and narrated by Maya Angelou.

== Bibliography ==
- The Art of Emceeing: An Easy to Follow Step-By-Step Guide for the Aspiring Hip Hop Artist. Atlanta, GA: Boss Up. 2005. ISBN 978-0-9770092-0-6.
- Warrior Names from Afrika. 2006.
