= Dead Prez =

American hip hop duo

dead prez
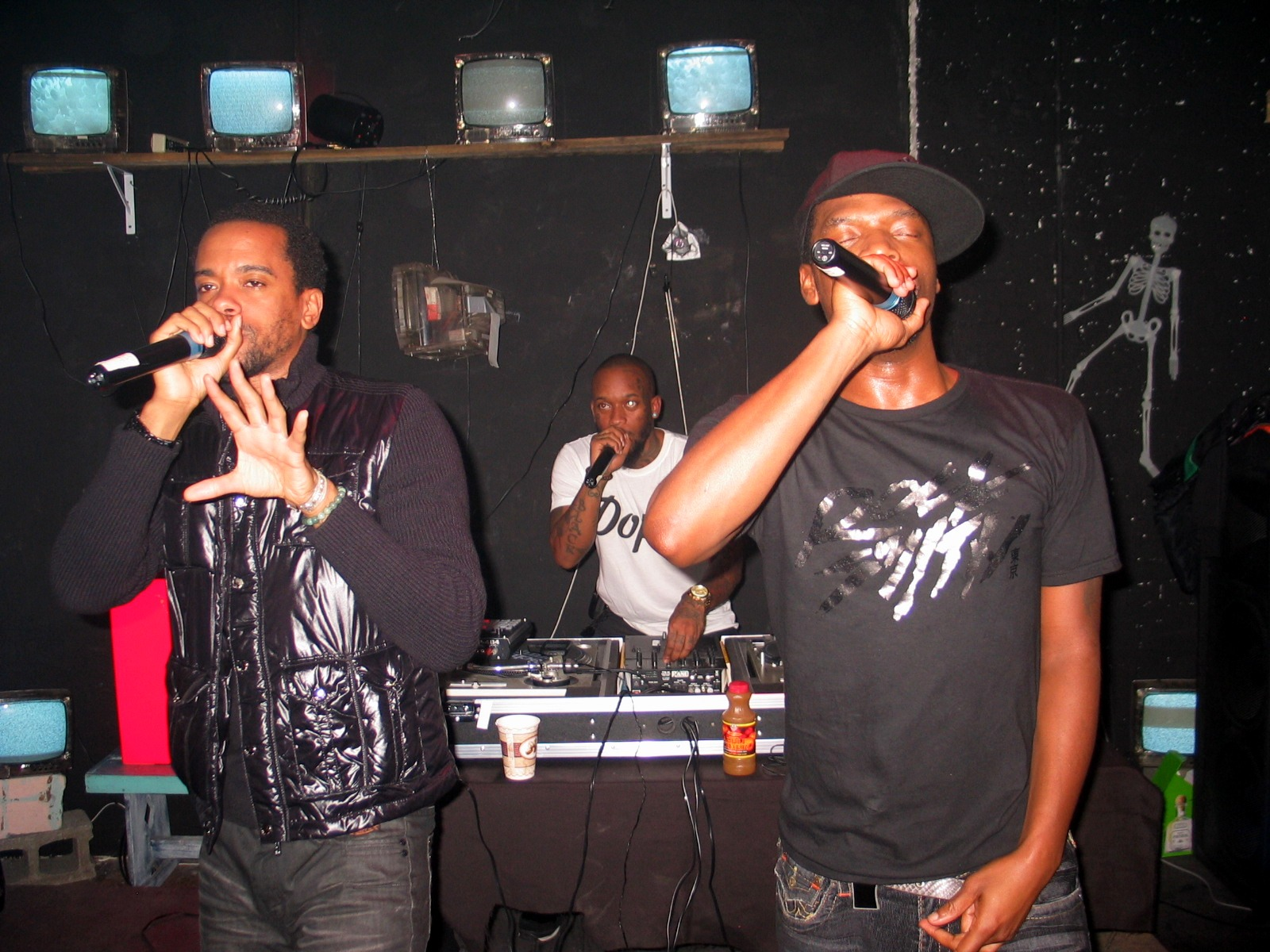
- Dead Prez performing in Lansing, 2009

Background information
- Origin: New York City, U.S.
- Genres: Hip hop; political hip hop; conscious hip hop
- Years active: 1996–present
- Labels: Loud; Relativity; Invasion
- Members: M-1; stic.man
- Website: deadprez.com

Dead Prez (stylized in lowercase) is an American hip hop duo composed of M-1 and stic.man, formed in 1996 in New York City. They are known for their confrontational style, combined with lyrics focused on both militant social justice, self-determination, and Pan-Africanism. The duo maintains an ethical stance against corporate control over the media, especially hip hop record labels.

== Career ==
=== Background (1993–2000) ===
In 1993, M-1 headed to Tallahassee, Florida, to attend Florida Agricultural and Mechanical University (FAMU) where he and stic.man met and formed a relationship due to their mutual love of music and similar leftist political ideology. While there, their views solidified, M-1 becoming particularly interested in the Black Panther Party.

M-1 joined the International People's Democratic Uhuru Movement in Chicago for three years, while stic.man remained in Florida. Burned out by the arduous labor of Uhuru, M-1 and stic.man chose to focus on music. Brand Nubian's Lord Jamar discovered them in New York City and signed them a deal with Loud Records. Although dead prez was not always Loud's top priority, they built a fan base due to their over-the-top performances (they have been known to ignite dollar bills and toss apples into the audiences, declaring that they must eat healthy).

They had begun contributing songs to film soundtracks and made featurings on high-profile albums. Their first recorded song, "The Game of Life (Score)" appeared on the 1997 soundtrack to the film Soul in the Hole. In 1998 their song "D.O.P.E. (Drugs Oppress People Everyday)" was featured in the movie Slam. Also in 1998, they were featured on the skit "The Rain and the Sun" off Big Pun's album Capital Punishment, and in 1999 were featured on The Beatnuts' song "Look Around" off their album Musical Massacre.

=== Releases (2000–present) ===
Dead prez uses the shi hexagram, "Leading" or "The Army", as part of their logo.

The duo's debut album was 2000's Let's Get Free, with their most popular single to date "Hip-Hop". The album was well received by critics, and included intense political monologues featuring prominent black activist Omali Yeshitela, as well as "Animal in Man" – a retelling of George Orwell's Animal Farm. The instrumental version of their song "Hip Hop" was used as Dave Chappelle's entrance music for his show on Comedy Central, and can be heard on every episode. "Hip Hop" has also been featured on the soundtrack of the video game skate. as well as underground graffiti art documentaries of the era. The song is also used in the introduction of Hip Hop Evolution, a show which is currently on Netflix. In 2001 they collaborated with The Coup, another politically active hip hop outfit, to release Get Up.

In 2002, dead prez contributed to Red Hot + Riot, a compilation album created by the Red Hot Organization in tribute to the music and work of Nigerian musician Fela Kuti. The money raised by the CD was used for various charities devoted to raising AIDS awareness and fighting the disease. They collaborated with fellow hip-hop artists Talib Kweli and Bilal and Brazilian singer Jorge Ben to remake the famous Fela Kuti song "Shuffering and Shmiling" for the album. Also in 2002, dead prez released the independent mix tape Turn off the Radio: The Mixtape Vol. 1, followed by the release of Turn off the Radio: The Mixtape Vol. 2: Get Free or Die Tryin' in 2003. Also in 2003, their song "Hell Yeah" was featured in the 2 Fast 2 Furious soundtrack as well as in episode 8 of the 2023 Showtime series The Curse. In 2004, Columbia Records finally released Revolutionary But Gangsta. They were featured in the film Dave Chappelle's Block Party, in 2006.

In 2006, they and former 2Pac collaborators, the Outlawz, jointly released two new albums: Can't Sell Dope Forever and Soldier 2 Soldier. In 2006, M1 also recorded a solo album titled Confidential. From the album, the song "'Til We Get There" was on the EA Sports video game NBA Live 07. In 2007, stic.man released his own solo record named Manhood with Boss Up Inc. / Traffic records. M-1 further appeared with ProfessorD.us, of the politically charged Hip Hop group The Dope Poet Society, on the track "Everything's Political" off the 2008 album THIRD WORLD WARriors Vol. 1. On the track, M-1 and ProfessorD.us trade verses in response to the question "why is your music always so political?". That same year, Stic.Man appeared on "Changing Weather", the first single from Marcel Cartier's album Revolutionary Minded 2.

Dead prez released a mixtape entitled Pulse of the People: Turn Off Your Radio Vol. 3 on June 23, 2009. The mixtape is hosted by DJ Green Lantern. On Mother's Day 2010, dead prez released "The Beauty Within", a remix of B.o.B and Bruno Mars' #1 single "Nothin' On You." Additionally in 2010, dead prez released a mixtape with DJ Drama entitled Turn Off the Radio Vol. 4: Revolutionary but Gangsta Grillz. The album is available for free download on their website, and they announced this release was their ten year commemoration of their most well known and commercially successful album Let's Get Free. The new album Information Age was released on October 16, 2012.

== Documentary (2006) ==
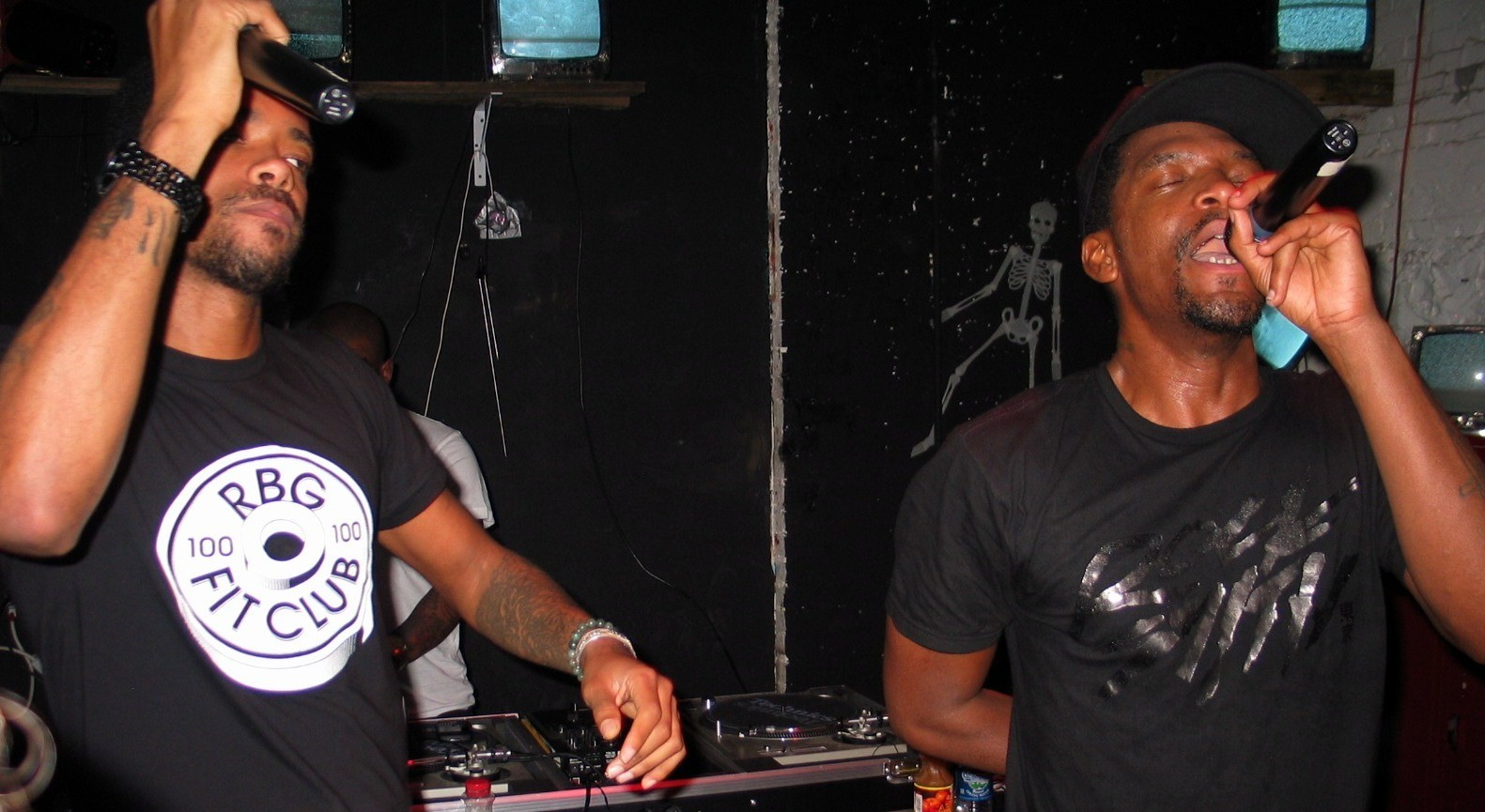
Dead Prez performing on December 13, 2009

In June 2006, the cable movie network Starz InBlack began airing an original documentary called Dead Prez: It's Bigger Than Hip Hop directed by John Threat. The hour-long documentary featured live footage and interviews with dead prez, along with interviews from Kamel Bell, owner of Ankh Marketing and son of incarcerated Black Panther member Herman Bell; Fred Hampton Jr., son of Black Panther Deputy Chairman of the Illinois Chapter Fred Hampton; Bay Area rapper and poet Ise Lyfe, and hip hop activist and radio personality Davey D. Among the topics discussed in the documentary are the inadequacies of the public education system, Black entrepreneurship and social revolution.

Our aim is to provide a programming experience that viewers will not get anywhere else. We like to push the limits and go where other networks fear to tread. We recognized in dead prez a message that deserves to be heard. Not everyone will agree with them, but that's OK. We aim to enlighten and entertain, and 'Dead Prez: It's Bigger than Hip Hop' does both.

— David Charmatz, senior vice president of channel management, talking about the programming philosophy at Starz InBlack

M1 stated:

We've never had the opportunity to express ourselves on this level of magnitude. Starz InBlack taking a chance on us lets us know that the work we are doing is not in vain. That our message is penetrating, it's getting through.

== Discography ==
Studio albums

- 2000: Let's Get Free
- 2004: Revolutionary But Gangsta
- 2012: Information Age

Live albums

- 2008: Live in San Francisco

Collaboration albums

- 2006: Can't Sell Dope Forever (with Outlawz)

Mixtapes

- 2002: Turn Off the Radio: The Mixtape Vol. 1 (as dpz)
- 2003: Turn Off the Radio: The Mixtape Vol. 2: Get Free or Die Tryin'
- 2009: Pulse of the People: Turn Off the Radio Vol. 3 (hosted by DJ Green Lantern)
- 2010: Turn Off the Radio Vol. 4: Revolutionary but Gangsta Grillz (hosted by DJ Drama)
