= M-1 (rapper) =

American rapper (born 1975)

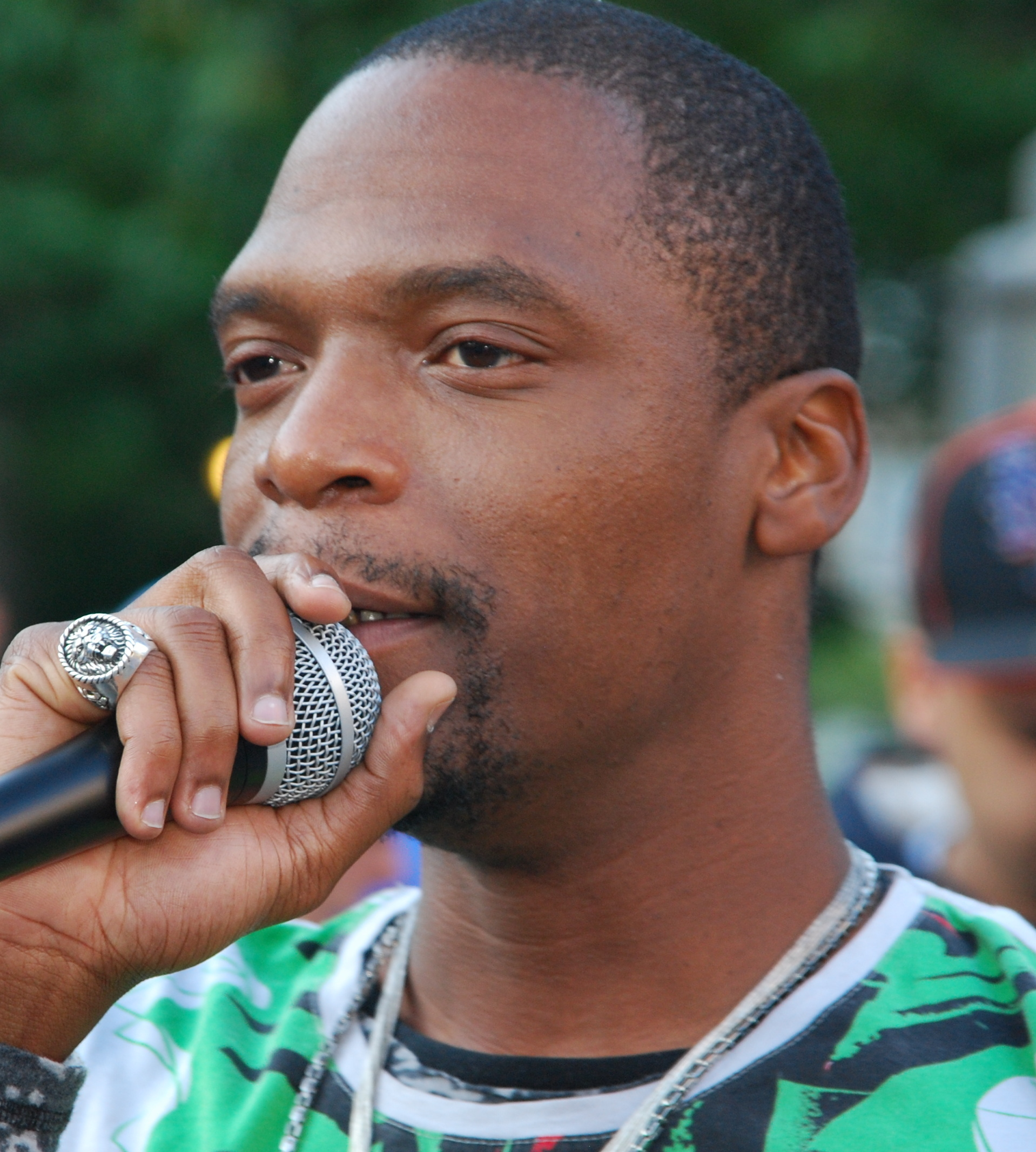
- M-1 in New York City in 2009

Background information
- Also known as: Mutulu Olugbala; M-1; Eme Olu; Eme-Uno (in Spanish)
- Born: Lavonne Alford; July 25, 1975 (age 51)
- Origin: Raleigh, North Carolina, U.S.
- Genre: Hip-hop
- Occupations: Rapper; songwriter; activist
- Years active: 1996–present
- Labels: Sotti; MNRK
- Member of: Dead Prez

Mutulu Olugbala (born Lavonne Alford, July 25, 1975), better known by his stage name M-1 (sometimes stylized as M1), is an American rapper, songwriter, and activist from Brooklyn, New York. He is best known for his work as one half of the political hip-hop duo dead prez with stic.man.

== Career ==
M-1's first solo album, Confidential, credited to "Dead Prez Presents M-1," was released on March 21, 2006, through Sotti/Koch Records. The album also had one of its songs, "'til We Get There" on the EA Sports game NBA Live 2007 in the tracklist. Following Confidential M-1 worked on the album Can't Sell Dope Forever by Dead Prez & Outlawz.

M-1 had the lead role in Broken Rhyme, a 2006 American 90-minute feature film and drama directed and produced by Detdrich McClure about a disillusioned rapper who goes to Japan to shoot a video there and encounters a mysterious Japanese woman who leads him on a spiritual journey and the heavy price he has to pay for turning his back on the forces that run the hip-hop music industry. The film premiered at the Filmlife and HBO American Black Film Festival in June 2006 as an Official Selection.

M-1 is also featured in the UK documentary, Guilty or Innocent of Using the N Word.

M-1 is also a political activist for many black and left-wing causes. In July 2009, M-1 accompanied the Viva Palestina convoy, delivering humanitarian supplies to Palestinians in the Gaza Strip. In 2010, M-1 was featured on British-Palestinian rapper Shadia Mansour's single "Al Kufiyyeh 3arabeyyeh" ("The Keffiyeh is Arabian") in her response to the "Israeli Keffiyah", an attempt by Zionists to rebrand the garment as an Israeli attire. M-1 is a co-founder of Urban Aroma, "a platform for cannabis, art, activism and social equity with editorial and charitable commitments."

== Discography ==
Solo albums

- 2006: Confidential

Collaboration albums

- 2011: AP2P – All Power to the People (with Bonnot)
- 2013: Evolutionary Minded (Furthering the Legacy of Gil Scott-Heron) (with Kentyah, Brian Jackson & The New Midnight Band)
- 2016: Between Me and the World (with Bonnot)

== Filmography ==
- 1999: Whiteboyz
- 2001: Brooklyn Babylon
- 2006: Guilty or Innocent of Using the N Word as himself (documentary)
- 2006: Broken Rhyme as himself (feature film)
- 2012: Long Distance Revolutionary: A Journey with Mumia Abu-Jamal as himself (documentary)

== Videography ==
- 2006: "Till We Get There" feat. Stori James and K'naan
