= The Martyr (album) =

Compilation album by Immortal Technique
- Released: October 27, 2011
- Genre: Hip hop, underground hip hop, political hip hop
- Label: Viper Records; Fontana
- Producer: J Dilla, SouthPaw, DJ Green Lantern

Immortal Technique chronology
The 3rd World (2008)	The Martyr (2011)	The Middle Passage (TBA)

Professional ratings
Review scores
Source	Rating
HipHopSite	4/5 stars
Thethirdestate	(Positive)
RapReviews	4.25/5 stars

The Martyr is a compilation album by rapper Immortal Technique, released on October 27, 2011, through free digital download on ViperRecords.com. It is a collection of previously unreleased songs. The Martyr had 200,000 downloads on its first day, and 1,000,000 in its first week through his independent label, Viper Records.

== Track listing ==
#	Title	Featured guest(s)	Producer	Length
1	"Burn This (Intro)"			0:18
2	"The Martyr"		Southpaw	4:31
3	"Angels & Demons"	dead prez & Bazaar Royale	DJ Green Lantern	4:53
4	"Rich Man's World (1%)"		Shuko	4:41
5	"Toast to the Dead"		J.Dilla; cuts by DJ Green Lantern	3:50
6	"Eyes in the Sky"	Mojo of Dujeous	Southpaw	2:23
7	"Goonies Never Die"	Diabolic, Swave Sevah & Gomez	Southpaw	5:25
8	"Running Nowhere (Interlude)"		Southpaw	0:56
9	"Natural Beauty"	Mela Machinko	Slimfass	3:44
10	"Civil War"	Killer Mike, Brother Ali & Chuck D	Southpaw	5:04
11	"Mark of the Beast"	Akir & Beast 1333	The Molemen; cuts by DJ DP-One	4:00
12	"Black Vikings"	Styles P, Vinnie Paz & Poison Pen	Southpaw	5:32
13	"Conquerors (Interlude)"	Dr. John Henrik Clarke	Engineer	1:38
14	"Young Lords"	Joell Ortiz, Pumpkinhead, CF & Panama Alba	Southpaw	5:07
15	"Últimas Palabras"		Immortal Technique, Southpaw	7:36
16	"Sign of the Times"	Cetan Wanbli, Lockjaw Nakai & Cornel West	Southpaw	4:23

Notes

- "Angels & Demons" samples "Dream On" by Aerosmith
- "Rich Man's World (1%) starts with an extract of the 1976 movie, Network and samples "Money, Money, Money" by ABBA and "Money" by Pink Floyd
- "Goonies Never Die" samples "Theme From the Goonies" by Dave Grusin from the soundtrack to the 1985 movie, The Goonies
- "Toast to the Dead" samples "Alpha" by Vangelis
- "Eyes in the Sky" samples "Eye in the Sky" by The Alan Parsons Project
- "The Martyr" starts with an extract of the 1998 movie, Elizabeth and features an interpolation of "Eleanor Rigby" by The Beatles
- "Young Lords" samples "Runaway" by Bon Jovi
- "Black Vikings" samples "Beowulf Main Theme" by Alan Silvestri
- "Conquerors" samples "Looking Back" by Pierre Arvay
- "Sign of the Times" samples "La Partida" by Victor Jara
