= The 3rd World =

Studio album by Immortal Technique
- Released: June 24, 2008
- Recorded: 2007–08
- Studio: Viper Studios (New York, NY)
- Genre: Political hip hop; underground hip hop; hardcore hip hop
- Label: Viper Records
- Producer: Buckwild; Bronze Nazareth; DJ GI Joe; DJ Green Lantern; Fyre Dept.; Metaphysics; Scram Jones; Sick Jacken; Shuko; SouthPaw; Spictacular

Immortal Technique chronology
Revolutionary Vol. 2 (2003)	The 3rd World (2008)	The Martyr (2011)

Professional ratings
Review scores
Source	Rating
About.com	4.5/5 stars
AllMusic	3/5 stars
Glide	4/5
HipHopDX	4.5/5
IGN	8.5/10
RapReviews	9/10
Robert Christgau	(1-star Honorable Mention)
Sputnikmusic	3.5/5

The 3rd World is the third studio album by American rapper Immortal Technique. It was released on June 24, 2008, through Viper Records, following a five-year absence since Revolutionary Vol. 2. Recording sessions took place at Viper Studios in New York. Production was handled by DJ Green Lantern, SouthPaw, Shuko, Bronze Nazareth, Buckwild, DJ G.I. Joe, Fyre Dept., Metaphysics, Scram Jones, Sick Jacken, Spictacular, and Immortal Technique himself, who also served as executive producer together with Jonathan Stuart. It features guest appearances from Chino XL, Crooked I, Cynic, Da Circle, Diabolic, J.Arch, Maya Azucena, Mojo The Cinematic, Poison Pen, Ras Kass, Sick Jacken, Swave Sevah, Temperamento and Veneno.

The album peaked at number 99 on the Billboard 200, number 36 on the Top R&B/Hip-Hop Albums, number 12 on the Top Rap Albums and number 10 on the Independent Albums chart in the United States. He claimed in an interview from September 2009 to have sold more than 60,000 copies. The album was conceived while recording material for other forthcoming projects with DJ Green Lantern and Southpaw.

In 2009 Immortal Technique used the proceeds from this album to fund and construct an orphanage in Afghanistan.

== Track listing ==
No.	Title	Producer(s)	Length
1.	"Death March"	DJ Green Lantern	2:57
2.	"That's What It is"	Spictacular	4:34
3.	"Golpe De Estado" (featuring Temperamento and Veneno)	Toure "Southpaw" Harris	4:36
4.	"Harlem Renaissance"	DJ Green Lantern	4:03
5.	"Lick Shots" (featuring Crooked I and Chino XL)	Toure "Southpaw" Harris	4:44
6.	"Apocrypha"	Sick Jacken	0:42
7.	"The 3rd World"	DJ Green Lantern	4:44
8.	"Hollywood Driveby / Watchout RMX" (featuring Sick Jacken and Cynic)	Shuko; DJ G.I. Joe	6:44
9.	"Reverse Pimpology" (featuring Mojo the Cinematic of Dujeous)	Metaphysics	4:30
10.	"Open Your Eyes"	Toure "Southpaw" Harris; Mesone	5:15
11.	"The Payback" (featuring Diabolic and Ras Kass)	Bronze Nazareth	4:26
12.	"Adios Uncle Tom" (Skit)	Toure "Southpaw" Harris; Immortal Technique	0:40
13.	"Stronghold Grip" (featuring Poison Pen and Swave Sevah)	Buckwild	4:03
14.	"Mistakes"	Scram Jones	3:25
15.	"Out on Parole" (Evil Genius Mix)	DJ Green Lantern	3:59
16.	"Crimes of the Heart / Rebel Arms" (featuring Maya Azucena, J.Arch and Da Circle)	Toure "Southpaw" Harris; Shuko	8:33

Notes

- Fyre Dept.-produced "Apocalypse Remix" featuring Akir & Pharoahe Monch is a hidden track.

== Personnel ==
- Toure "SouthPaw" Harris – recording, mixing
- Mark B. Christensen – mastering
- Felipe "Immortal Technique" Coronel – executive producer
- Jonathan Stuart – executive producer
- Cary Stuart – artwork, photography
- Tanya Serrano – artwork
- Trea Brown – photography

== Charts ==
Chart (2008)	Peak position
US Billboard 200	99
US Top R&B/Hip-Hop Albums (Billboard)	36
US Top Rap Albums (Billboard)	12
US Independent Albums (Billboard)	10
