= Road to the Riches: The Best of the Purple City Mixtapes =

Road to the Riche$: The Best of the Purple City Mixtapes

Compilation album by Purple City
- Released: March 8, 2005
- Genre: Hip-hop
- Length: 1:03:05
- Label: Purple City; Babygrande
- Producer: Agallah; Amadeus; Dujeous; Fred Bear; Jimmy The Greek; Kevin Veney; Loren Hill; Niche; Rich Shelton; Sebastian; Shiest Bub; Teflon

Purple City chronology
Road to the Riche$: The Best of the Purple City Mixtapes (2005)	The Purple Album (2005)

Professional ratings
Review scores
Source	Rating
AllMusic	3.5/5 stars
HipHopDX	3/5
RapReviews	6.5/10

Road to the Riches: The Best of the Purple City Mixtapes is the first compilation album by the American hip-hop record label Purple City Entertainment. It was released on March 8, 2005, through Babygrande Records. The album has the singles "Purple City Byrdgang" (for which a music video was shot) and "It Ain't Easy" (its B-side).

The album debuted at number 164 on the Billboard 200, number 24 on the Top R&B/Hip-Hop Albums, number 9 on both the Top Rap Albums and Heatseekers Albums and number 13 on the Independent Albums charts in the United States.

== Track listing ==
No.	Title	Writer(s)	Producer(s)	Length
1.	"The Road to the Richest (Intro)"			1:05
2.	"Piff Iz da Answer" (performed by Shiest Bub, Un Kasa and Agallah)	Timothy Parsons; Antonio Wilder; Angel Aguilar	Agallah	3:00
3.	"Winning" (performed by Un Kasa and Bathgate)	Wilder; Lionel Evans; Aguilar	Agallah	4:07
4.	"Purple City Byrdgang" (performed by Shiest Bub, Un Kasa and Jim Jones)	Parsons; Wilder; Joseph Jones II; Aguilar	Agallah; Shiest Bub	3:55
5.	"Insight With Panchi (Skit)"			0:29
6.	"Me & U" (performed by Shiest Bub, Un Kasa and J.R. Writer)	Parsons; Wilder; Rusty Brito; Aguilar	Agallah	3:51
7.	"It Ain't Easy" (performed by Shiest Bub and Agallah)	Parsons; Aguilar	Agallah	3:35
8.	"Broadway" (performed by Shiest Bub, Agallah and Alleyway)	Parsons; Aguilar; Alleyway		1:55
9.	"Will Not Lose" (performed by Un Kasa)	Wilder; Antwan J. Thompson	Amadeus	2:49
10.	"Insight With Panchi II (Skit)"			0:17
11.	"Copz Is Coming" (performed by Un Kasa and Juelz Santana)	Wilder; LaRon James; Sheldon Harris	Teflon	3:49
12.	"Real *%#@!$" (performed by Shiest Bub, Un Kasa, Agallah and D. Doubler)	Parsons; Wilder; Aguilar; D. Doubler	Agallah	4:23
13.	"A Part of History" (performed by DK and L. Childress)	Justin Essandoh; Rich Shelton; Loren Hill; Kevin Veney	Rich Shelton; Loren Hill; Kevin Veney	4:08
14.	"Insight With Panchi III (Skit)"			0:23
15.	"Roll It Up, Light It Up" (performed by Shiest Bub, Un Kasa and Agallah)	Parsons; Wilder; Aguilar; Dimitri Christo	Jimmy The Greek	4:20
16.	"America Show" (performed by Agallah)	Aguilar	Agallah	3:49
17.	"A Star" (performed by Un Kasa and Komika)	Wilder; Komika Hall; Niche	Niche	3:03
18.	"The Accident (Skit)"			2:07
19.	"Late Night" (performed by Un Kasa and Sebastian)	Wilder; Sebastian	Sebastian	3:38
20.	"Gun Go" (performed by Un Kasa, Agallah, Juelz Santana and Jim Jones)	Wilder; Aguilar; James; Jones II; Dujeous	Dujeous	4:05
21.	"Come 2 Get Ya" (performed by Un Kasa and Agallah)	Wilder; Aguilar; Fred Bear	Fred Bear	4:17
Total length:				1:03:05

== Charts ==
Chart (2005)	Peak position
US Billboard 200	164
US Top R&B/Hip-Hop Albums (Billboard)	24
US Top Rap Albums (Billboard)	9
US Heatseekers Albums (Billboard)	9
US Independent Albums (Billboard)	13
