= Legacy (Akir album) =

Studio album by Akir
- Released: March 20, 2006
- Studio: Viper Studios (New York, NY)
- Genre: Hip-hop
- Length: 1:11:32
- Label: Viper Records
- Producer: Akir; Apex; Dada; Den'D Productions; DJ N'finit; DJ Static; Illastrate; R'Sonist; Southpaw; The Fire Dept.; Y.G.

Akir chronology
Street Edition, Vol. 1 & 2 (2004)	Legacy (2006)	Supporter Sundays (2011)

Professional ratings
Review scores
Source	Rating
HipHopDX	3.5/5
PopMatters	6/10
RapReviews	8.5/10

Legacy is the debut studio album by American underground rapper Akir. It was released on March 20, 2006, via Viper Records. Recording sessions took place at Viper Studios in New York. Production was handled by SouthPaw, Apex, Dada, Den'D Productions, DJ N'finite, DJ Static, Fyre Dept., Illastrate, Rsonist, YG, and Akir himself. It features guest appearances from Immortal Technique, Akua Wilder, Hasan Salaam, Jean Grae, Krystl Yardon, Mas D, Mojo and Veks One. "Politricks" was released as a single on July 22, 2005.

== Track listing ==
No.	Title	Writer(s)	Producer(s)	Length
1.	"The Initiation" (performed by Abiodun Oyewole)	Charles Davis	Rsonist	2:03
2.	"Rites of Passage"	Stephen Woods	SouthPaw	3:30
3.	"Mood Music"	Woods	Akir; SouthPaw	4:38
4.	"Grind"	Woods	SouthPaw	3:20
5.	"Treason" (featuring Immortal Technique)	Woods; Felipe Coronel	DJ Static	3:35
6.	"This Is Your Life, Pt. 2"	Woods	Akir; Dada	4:17
7.	"Kunta Kinte"	Woods	Y.G.	3:53
8.	"Politricks"	Woods	Akir	3:40
9.	"Apocalypse"	Woods	Fyre Dept.	3:40
10.	"Change of the Seasons" (featuring Hasan Salaam)	Woods; M. Salaam	SouthPaw	2:51
11.	"Ressurect" (featuring Akua Wilder and Krystl Yardon)	Woods; Akua Wilder; Krystl Yardon	Illastrate	3:51
12.	"Ride 2 It"	Woods	Akir	3:57
13.	"No Longer My Home" (featuring Mojo)	Woods	Akir	3:31
14.	"These R the Blues"	Woods	SouthPaw	4:02
15.	"Pedigree"	Woods	Den'D Productions	1:45
16.	"So Much"	Woods	DJ N'finit	2:36
17.	"Homeward Bound"	Woods	Akir; Dada	3:23
18.	"Tropical Fantasy" (featuring Jean Grae)	Woods; Tsidi Ibrahim	SouthPaw	4:14
19.	"Legacy" (featuring Mas D and Veks One)	Woods; David Kupferstein; Veks One	Apex	5:01
20.	"The Louisiana Purchase (Bonus)" (featuring Poison Pen, Immortal Technique and Mojo)	Woods	Akir; SouthPaw	3:45
Total length:				1:11:32

== Personnel ==
- Stephen "Akir" Woods – vocals (tracks: 2–20), bass & synthesizer (track 15), producer (tracks: 3, 6, 8, 12, 13, 17, 20)
- Charles "Abiodun Oyewole" Davis – vocals (tracks: 1, 6, 19)
- Felipe "Immortal Technique" Coronel – vocals (tracks: 5, 20), executive producer
- Hasan Salaam – vocals (track 10)
- Akua Wilder – vocals (track 11, 19)
- Krystl Yardon – vocals (track 11)
- Mojo – vocals (tracks: 13, 19, 20)
- Tsidi "Jean Grae" Ibrahim – vocals (track 18)
- David "Mas D" Kupferstein – vocals (track 19)
- Veks One – vocals (track 19), additional vocals (track 2)
- Lékan "Poison Pen" Herron – vocals (track 20), additional vocals (tracks: 2, 4)
- Amin Joseph – additional vocals (tracks: 2, 6)
- E-Class – additional vocals (track 2)
- King Kof – additional vocals (tracks: 2, 4)
- Toure "Southpaw" Harris – additional vocals (track 4), bass (tracks: 7, 8, 12, 15), keyboards & strings (track 7), synthesizer (track 15), producer (tracks: 2–4, 10, 14, 18, 20), recording, mixing, associate executive producer
- DJ S.E. – scratches (track 3)
- DP One – scratches (track 5)
- Alex "Apex" Gale – bass (track 6), producer (track 19)
- Deanna "Trackslaya" Hawkins – keyboards (track 16)
- Dave Guy – horn (track 17)
- Gregory "Rsonist" Green – producer (track 1)
- Alex "DJ Static" Gyesi – producer (track 5)
- Dada – producer (tracks: 6, 17)
- Y.G. – producer (track 7)
- The Fire Dept. – producer (track 9)
- Illastrate – producer (track 11)
- Den'D Productions – producer (track 15)
- DJ N'finit – producer (track 16)
- Sarah Register – mastering
- Jonathan Stuart – executive producer
- Andre Trenier – cover painting
- Christopher "Tetsuo" Howard – design
- Oldemar "Mind3d" Santamaria – graphics, layout
