= Bin Laden (song) =

Single by Immortal Technique, Mos Def and DJ Green Lantern
- Released: August 9, 2005
- Recorded: 2004
- Genre: Hip-hop
- Length: 3:56
- Label: Babygrande Records, Viper Records
- Songwriter: Felipe Andres Coronel: James Christopher D'Agostino
- Producer: DJ Green Lantern

"Bin Laden" is a hip hop song by Immortal Technique, Mos Def and DJ Green Lantern.

The song appeared on mixtapes since November 2004, but was not released until August 9, 2005. The 12" vinyl single also featured a remix by the same artists, adding Chuck D of Public Enemy and KRS-One. It also features two lines by Eminem: "I don't rap for dead presidents, I'd rather see the president dead/It's never been said but I set precedents" from "We As Americans", and "Shady Records was eighty seconds away from the Towers/Them cowards fucked with the wrong building, they meant to hit ours" from 50 Cent's "Patiently Waiting".

== Music and lyrics ==
The song, whose lyrics argue that conspiracy theories about 9/11, such as George W. Bush and previous Republican administrations being largely responsible for the September 11, 2001 attacks, was received critically given its controversial chorus theme "Bush knocked down the towers", sampled from the song "Why?" by Jadakiss. The song first appeared on mixtapes on 9 October 2004.

Immortal Technique raps: "Bush funded al-Qaeda, and now they blame the Muslim religion, even though bin Laden was a CIA tactician, they gave him billions of dollars, and they funded his purpose, Fahrenheit 9/11, that's just scratchin' the surface." In another line, Immortal Technique raps: "And of course Saddam Hussein had chemical weapons. We sold him that shit, after Ronald Reagan's election."

Immortal Technique explained his views on 9/11 in a 2008 interview:

I said on [Revolutionary] Volume 2, that I didn't think Bush was responsible for 9/11, I just figured that the government is lying about their relationships with the people involved in it. I'm not trying to come off like a conspiracy theorist, that's fine, but you can't marginalize the facts. I believe wasn't all but two of the hijackers were from Saudi Arabia, and we invade Afghanistan and Iraq. Now we use the premise that the Taliban is harboring bin Laden but we pull out tens of thousands of troops when we have him cornered. There's a lot of things that are conspiracy theories that are actually true, they happen. I'm not just sitting here and saying outlandish things. There's definitely things the government doesn't want us to know, not for our protection, but for their protection.

== Samples ==
- "Why" by Jadakiss
- "We As Americans" by Eminem
- "Patiently Waiting" by 50 Cent featuring Eminem
