= Revolutionary Vol. 2 =

Studio album by Immortal Technique
- Released: November 18, 2003
- Studios: Viper Studios (New York, NY)
- Genre: Political hip hop
- Length: 1:07:46
- Label: Viper Records
- Producers: .44 Caliber; 5th Seal; Domingo; Metaphysics; Omen; SouthPaw

Immortal Technique chronology
Revolutionary Vol. 1 (2001)	Revolutionary Vol. 2 (2003)	The 3rd World (2008)

Singles from Revolutionary Vol. 2
- 1. "Point of No Return" Released: 2003; 2. "Industrial Revolution" Released: 2004

Professional ratings
Review scores
Source	Rating
HipHopDX	9/10
Pitchfork	7.4/10
RapReviews	8.5/10
Robert Christgau	(3-star Honorable Mention)
Tiny Mix Tapes	4/5 marks

Revolutionary Vol. 2 is the second studio album by American rapper Immortal Technique. It was released on November 18, 2003, through Viper Records, serving as a sequel to his 2001 debut Revolutionary Vol. 1. Recording sessions took place at Viper Studios in New York. Production was handled by SouthPaw, Daneja, Domingo, Metaphysics, Omen and 44 Caliber, with Jonathan Stuart and Immortal Technique serving as executive producers. It features guest appearances from Mumia Abu-Jamal, Akir, C-Rayz Walz, Diabolic, Jean Grae, Loucipher, Poison Pen, Pumpkinhead and Tonedeff.

Revolutionary Vol. 2 attacks the United States government, especially the Bush administration. Immortal Technique claimed in an interview to have sold more than 85,000 copies. The album features Mumia Abu-Jamal, who introduces the album and also provides a speech about hip hop's relationship to homeland security. Issues repeatedly discussed on the album include poverty, drug trade, slave labor, censorship, corporate control over the media (including hip hop), the September 11th World Trade Center attacks, racism, the prison industrial complex and class struggle.

Revolutionary Vol. 1 and Vol. 2 were re-pressed in 2004 via Babygrande Records.

== Track listing ==
No.	Title	Producer(s)	Length
1.	"Revolutionary Intro" (featuring Mumia Abu-Jamal)		0:13
2.	"Point of No Return"	Toure "Southpaw" Harris	4:03
3.	"Peruvian Cocaine" (featuring Pumpkinhead, Diabolic, Tonedeff, Poison Pen, Loucipher and C-Rayz Walz)	Toure "Southpaw" Harris	4:50
4.	"Harlem Streets"	Toure "Southpaw" Harris; cuts by Roc Raida	3:54
5.	"Obnoxious"	Toure "Southpaw" Harris	4:51
6.	"The Message and the Money"	Toure "Southpaw" Harris	3:57
7.	"Industrial Revolution"	Metaphysics; cuts by Roc Raida	3:40
8.	"Crossing the Boundary"	5th Seal formally known as Daneja	4:49
9.	"Sierra Maestra"	Domingo	0:49
10.	"The 4th Branch"	5th Seal formally known as Daneja	5:20
11.	"Internally Bleeding"	Domingo	2:47
12.	"Homeland and Hip Hop" (featuring Mumia Abu-Jamal)	.44 Caliber	2:46
13.	"The Cause of Death"	Omen; cuts by Chasekillz	5:55
14.	"Freedom of Speech"	5th Seal formally known as Daneja	3:09
15.	"Leaving the Past"	Toure "Southpaw" Harris	4:30
16.	"Truth's Razors"	Toure "Southpaw" Harris	0:21
17.	"You Never Know" (featuring Jean Grae)	Toure "Southpaw" Harris	7:50
18.	"One (Remix)" (featuring Akir)	Toure "Southpaw" Harris	4:36
Total length:			1:07:46
