= The Purple Album =

The Purple Album may refer to:

- The Purple Album (Purple City album)
- The Purple Album (Whitesnake album)
- 3 (The Purple Album), by Lukas Graham
