= Liar & a Thief =

Studio album by Diabolic
- Released: April 6, 2010
- Recorded: 2006–2010
- Studio: Viper Studios (New York, NY); The Newport Graveyard
- Genre: Hip-hop
- Length: 1:00:11
- Label: Viper Records
- Producer: Engineer; David Sivey; Diabolic; Immortal Technique; John Otto; Nate Augustus

Diabolic chronology
Foul Play Mixtape (2006)	Liar & a Thief (2010)	Fightin' Words (2014)

Professional ratings
Review scores
Source	Rating
HipHopDX	3/5
RapReviews	8/10

Liar & a Thief is the debut studio album by American rapper Diabolic. It was released on April 6, 2010, via Viper Records. Recording sessions took place at Viper Studios in New York and at The Newport Graveyard. Production was handled by Engineer, David Sivey, John Otto, Nate Augustus, Immortal Technique and Diabolic himself. It features guest appearances from Deadly Hunta, Immortal Technique, Canibus, Ill Bill, Vinnie Paz, John Otto, Nate Augustus, Poison Pen and Tones.

The album debuted at number 76 on the Billboard Top R&B/Hip-Hop Albums chart in the United States. It won 2010 HHUG Best Album of the Year award.

== Track listing ==
No.	Title	Writer(s)	Producer(s)	Length
1.	"Stand By"	Sean George; Brendan Kernaghan; A. Delgiudice	Engineer	4:23
2.	"Frontlines" (featuring Immortal Technique)	George; Felipe Coronel; Kernaghan	Engineer	4:21
3.	"Riot" (featuring Deadly Hunta and John Otto)	George; Trevor Samuels; John Otto; David Sivey	David Sivey; John Otto	3:52
4.	"Reasons"	George; Kernaghan	Engineer	3:47
5.	"Soldier's Logic" (featuring Poison Pen)	George; Lékan Herron; Kernaghan	Engineer	3:42
6.	"Order & Chaos" (featuring Ill Bill)	George; William Braunstein; Kernaghan	Engineer	3:18
7.	"I Don't Wanna Rhyme"	George; Kernaghan	Engineer	4:02
8.	"Truth, Part 2"	George; Kernaghan	Engineer	4:05
9.	"Nicolai Ros to the Goul" (Interlude)			1:00
10.	"Not Again" (featuring Vinnie Paz)	George; Vincenzo Luvineri; Kernaghan	Engineer	4:09
11.	"Loose Cannon"	George; Kernaghan	Engineer	3:56
12.	"12 Shots" (featuring Nate Augustus)	George; Nate Augustus; Kernaghan	Engineer; Nate Augustus	4:26
13.	"In Common" (featuring Canibus)	George; Germaine Williams; Kernaghan	Engineer	3:19
14.	"Modern Day Future" (featuring Deadly Hunta)	George; Samuels; Kernaghan	Engineer	3:32
15.	"Behind Bars"	George; Kernaghan	Engineer	3:42
16.	"Right Here" (featuring Immortal Technique and Tones)	George; Coronel; Frankie Milo; Kernaghan	Engineer	3:25
17.	"Self Destruction" (Outro)	George; Coronel	Diabolic; Immortal Technique	1:12
Total length:				1:00:11

== Personnel ==
- Sean "Diabolic" George – vocals, producer (track 17), executive producer, sleeve notes
- Felipe "Immortal Technique" Coronel – vocals (track 2), additional vocals (track 16), producer (track 17), executive producer
- Trevor "Deadly Hunta" Samuels – vocals (track 3), additional vocals (track 14)
- Lékan "Poison Pen" Herron – additional vocals (track 5)
- William "Ill Bill" Braunstein – vocals (track 6)
- Vincenzo "Vinnie Paz" Luviner – vocals (track 10)
- Germaine "Canibus" Williams – vocals (track 13)
- Frankie "Tones" Milo – additional vocals (track 16)
- Paul Lynch – guitar (track 3)
- John Otto – drums & producer (track 3)
- Nate Augustus – additional guitars & producer (track 12)
- Guy Buss – bass (track 12), programming (track 3), additional engineering
- Brendan "Engineer" Kernaghan – producer (tracks: 1, 2, 4–16), executive producer
- David Sivey – producer (track 3)
- Toure "Southpaw" Harris – recording (tracks: 1, 2, 4, 6–8, 13, 15, 17), mixing
- Adam "Nightwalker" Anderson – recording (tracks: 3, 5, 9–12, 14, 16)
- Mark B. Christensen – mastering
- Daniel Fry – mastering assistant
- Jonathan Stuart – executive producer
- Drew Kane – design
- Cary Stuart – photography

== Charts ==
Chart performance for Liar & A Thief
Chart (2010)	Peak position
US Top R&B/Hip-Hop Albums (Billboard)	76
