= You Already Know (disambiguation) =

"You Already Know" is a 2016 song by Fergie featuring Nicki Minaj.

You Already Know may also refer to:

- You Already Know (album), a 2006 album by Agallah
- "You Already Know", a song by Arcade Fire from their 2013 album Reflektor
- "You Already Know", a song by Train from the 2009 album Save Me, San Francisco

== See also ==
- "U Already Know", a 2004 song by 112
- "You Already Knew", a song by Rain from his 2003 album Rain 2
