= Paris to Purple City =

Studio album by Purple City
- Released: November 8, 2005
- Genre: Hip-hop
- Label: Purple City; Bon Vie; Babygrande
- Producer: Agallah

Purple City chronology
The Purple Album (2005)	Paris to Purple City (2005)	Born to the Purple (2006)

Professional ratings
Review scores
Source	Rating
HipHopDX	2.5/5
RapReviews	7/10

Paris to Purple City is the second studio album by Purple City, released in 2005 through Babygrande Records. The album was a collaboration between Purple City members Agallah and Un Kasa and French hip hop artists.

== Critical reception ==
AllMusic wrote that "it's interesting to see an international collaboration from the hustla's point of view." HipHopDX called Paris to Purple City "a stylistically fresh album that is actually way more French than American, although you’d almost never realize it."

== Track listing ==
1. "Paris to Purple City" – 5:44
2. "The French Connection" – 5:12
3. "No War" – 4:20
4. "Money Rules the World/Ici Bas" – 5:02
5. "Da Street" – 4:34
6. "Hip-Hop" – 4:52
7. "Rap Is All Around the World" – 5:07
8. "New York/Ville de Lumières" – 4:40
9. "Baby Girl" – 4:03
10. "It's Been a Long Way/La RouteEst Longue" – 4:40
