= Pulse of the People =

Pulse of the People: Turn Off the Radio Vol. 3

Mixtape by DJ Green Lantern and Dead Prez
- Released: June 23, 2009
- Genre: Hip-hop
- Length: 47:03
- Label: Invasion Music Group
- Producer: DJ Green Lantern

Dead Prez chronology
Can't Sell Dope Forever (2006)	Pulse of the People: Turn Off the Radio Vol. 3 (2009)	Turn Off the Radio Vol. 4: Revolutionary but Gangsta Grillz (2010)

Professional ratings
Review scores
Source	Rating
AllMusic	3.5/5 stars
Billboard	4.5/5 stars
HipHopDX	3.5/5
Pitchfork	6.6/10
PopMatters	5/10
RapReviews	7.5/10
Spin	8/10 marks
Tiny Mix Tapes	2.5/5 marks

Pulse of the People: Turn Off the Radio Vol. 3 is the collaborative mixtape by American record producer DJ Green Lantern and Brooklyn-based political hip-hop duo Dead Prez. It was released on June 23, 2009 via Invasion Music Group, serving as the third installment of the Dead Prez's Turn Off the Radio mixtape series. Hosted and produced by DJ Green Lantern, it features guest appearances from Avery Storm, Bun B, Chuck D, Johnny Polygon, Ratfink and Styles P. The album peaked at number 81 on the Top R&B/Hip-Hop Albums chart in the United States.

== Track listing ==
No.	Title	Length
1.	"WRBG"	0:11
2.	"Runnin' Wild"	4:28
3.	"Don't Hate My Grind" (featuring Bun B)	4:53
4.	"Warpath" (featuring RATFINK)	3:39
5.	"Gangsta, Gangster" (featuring Styles P)	4:01
6.	"Afrika Hot!"	3:22
7.	"NYDP" (featuring Johnny Polygon)	3:10
8.	"Summer Time"	3:53
9.	"Refuse to Lose" (featuring Chuck D and Avery Storm)	3:32
10.	"Life Goes On"	4:13
11.	"Helpful"	2:26
12.	"Pulse"	0:49
13.	"$timulus Plan"	4:58
14.	"My Dirty Valentine"	3:28
Total length:		47:03

== Charts ==
Chart (2009)	Peak position
US Top R&B/Hip-Hop Albums (Billboard)	81
