= The Purple Album (Purple City album) =

Studio album by Purple City
- Released: October 18, 2005
- Recorded: 2005
- Genre: Hip-hop
- Length: 1:00:02
- Labels: Purple City; Babygrande; Koch
- Producers: Agallah; Black Jeruz; Dame Grease; D-Dot; J.A.; J. Cardim; Jim Jones; Jimmy The Greek; Joey Chavez; Junius Bervine; Shiest Bub; Spliff; Teetimus; Uni Beats

Purple City chronology
Road to the Riches: The Best of the Purple City Mixtapes (2005)	The Purple Album (2005)	Paris to Purple City (2005)

Singles from The Purple Album
- 1. "Trap / Knick Knack" Released: 2006

Professional ratings
Review scores
Source	Rating
AllHipHop	2.5/5 stars
Pitchfork	5/10
PopMatters	3/10
The Source	3.5/5 stars
Spin	2/5 stars

The Purple Album is the debut studio album by the American hip hop group Purple City. It was released on October 18, 2005, through Purple City and Babygrande Records with distribution via Koch Records. Production was handled by Agallah, Black Jeruz, Dame Grease, D-Dot, J.A., J. Cardim, Jim Jones, Jimmy the Greek, Joey Chavez, Junius Bervine, Shiest Bub, Spliff, Teetimus and Uni Beats. It features guest appearances from 334 Mobb, Max B, A-Mafia, B.G., Buckshot, Buddy Klein, Den 10, DK, Ike Eyes, Jim Jones, Numbers, Smif-N-Wessun, Smoke DZA and the Lenox Ave Boys. A music video was released for the only promotional single: "Trap/Knick Knack".

== Track listing ==
No.	Title	Writer(s)	Producer(s)	Length
1.	"Live Your Life" (featuring Un Kasa)	Antonio Wilder; K. Groves	Uni Beats	2:29
2.	"Gangsta" (featuring Max B, Shiest Bub and Jim Jones)	Charly Wingate; Timothy Parsons; Joseph Jones	Jim Jones	3:58
3.	"Fly High" (featuring Shiest Bub and Agallah)	Parsons; Angel Aguilar; Joey Chavez	Joey Chavez	3:21
4.	"Trap Nigga" (featuring Shiest Bub, Jim Jones and Un Kasa)	Parsons; Jones; Wilder; Jonathan Adams; Stephen Hacker	Shiest Bub; J.A.	4:00
5.	"Go Head" (featuring Un Kasa, Den 10 and Numbers)	Wilder; Dennis Hamilton; N. White; Chavez	Joey Chavez	4:40
6.	"Harlem to B-More" (featuring Un Kasa, A-Mafia and DK)	Wilder; Abdul Holmes; Justin Essandoh; Jonas Cardim	J. Cardim	4:03
7.	"Nick Nack" (featuring Max B, Jim Jones and Un Kasa)	Wingate; Jones; Wilder; Deric Angelettie	D-Dot; Teetimus	4:03
8.	"Bank Roll" (featuring Shiest Bub, 334 Mobb, B.G. and Un Kasa)	Parsons; Keith Buchanan; Kennie Buchanan; Christopher Dorsey; Wilder; Hacker	Spliff	5:39
9.	"Hustlers" (featuring Shiest Bub, Agallah, Steele, Tek and Buckshot)	Parsons; Aguilar; Darrell Yates; Tekomin Williams; Kenyatta Blake; Damon Blackman	Dame Grease	4:20
10.	"Purple City and the Lot" (featuring Un Kasa and the Lenox Ave Boys)	Wilder; Ameen Burns; E. Holder; Blackman	Dame Grease	3:38
11.	"Picture Me Rollin" (featuring Agallah, Shiest Bub and Ike Eyes)	Aguilar; Parsons; Isaac Mendoza	Agallah	3:55
12.	"Head Bust Open" (featuring Shiest Bub and A-Mafia)	Parsons; Holmes; Dimitri Christo	Shiest Bub; Jimmy The Greek	3:58
13.	"P.A.Y.D.A.Y." (featuring Den 10, Smoke DZA and Numbers)	Hamilton; Sean Pompey; White; Junius Bervine	Junius Bervine	5:09
14.	"Grind Slow" (featuring Buddy Klein)	K. James; R. Smith	Black Jeruz	3:57
15.	"Catch Him" (featuring Shiest Bub)	Parsons; Aguilar	Agallah; Shiest Bub	2:52
Total length:				1:00:02

== Charts ==
Chart (2006)	Peak position
US Top R&B/Hip-Hop Albums (Billboard)	52
US Independent Albums (Billboard)	27
US Heatseekers Albums (Billboard)	24
