= Orange Moon Over Brooklyn =

Studio album by Pumpkinhead
- Released: August 23, 2005
- Genre: Hip hop
- Length: 57:55
- Label: Soulspazm; Rawkus
- Producer: Marco Polo; Moss

Pumpkinhead chronology
The Old Testament (2001)	Orange Moon Over Brooklyn (2005)	Picture That: The Negative (2008)

Singles from Orange Moon Over Brooklyn
- 1. "Rock On" Released: 2005

Orange Moon Over Brooklyn is the second studio album by American rapper Pumpkinhead. It was released by Soulspasm Records and distributed by Rawkus Records on August 23, 2005.

== Critical reception ==
Professional ratings
Review scores
Source	Rating
HipHopDX	favorable
RapReviews.com	8.5/10
XLR8R	favorable

Max Herman of XLR8R wrote, "Rocking hard over the crisp beats of Marco Polo, Pumpkinhead keeps his wordplay sharp yet graspable throughout." He called it "a testament to Pumpkinhead's undying dedication to hip-hop." Sophie Doran of Junkee commented that "Pumpkinhead is far from shy about paying tribute to the elders of the genre and the LP is littered with references to the pioneers and his appreciation for them and the art form, yet he still represents contemporary underground and particularly NY style raps exceptionally."

== Track listing ==
No.	Title	Length
1.	"Alkaline 'n' Acid" (featuring Raiden)	2:18
2.	"Authentic" (featuring D.V. Alias Khryst)	3:56
3.	"I Just Wanna Rhyme"	5:46
4.	"Trifactor" (featuring Supastition and Wordsworth)	3:45
5.	"Grenades"	2:36
6.	"DP One Interlude"	0:29
7.	"Rock On"	4:41
8.	"Anything"	6:22
9.	"Swordfish" (featuring Archrival)	3:08
10.	"Emcee"	3:11
11.	"Jukebox"	4:12
12.	"The Best"	3:13
13.	"Monkey Shine" (featuring The Plague)	5:07
14.	"Here"	3:43
15.	"Anthem for the End of the World" (featuring Jean Grae and Chas)	5:28
