= Dance with the Devil (Immortal Technique song) =

Song by Immortal Technique

Song by Immortal Technique

from the album Revolutionary Vol. 1
- Released: September 18, 2001
- Genre: Conscious hip hop; horrorcore
- Length: 9:39
- Songwriter: Felipe Andres Coronel
- Producer: 44 Caliber

Music video
- "Dance with the Devil" on YouTube

"Dance with the Devil" is a song by American rapper Immortal Technique, released alongside his debut studio album Revolutionary Vol. 1 on September 18, 2001. It follows a teenager who becomes a thug and attempts to gain entry into a street gang by participating in a horrific initiation ritual.

== Composition ==
The song is narrated by Immortal Technique over a looping piano sample taken from "(Where Do I Begin?) Love Story", the theme from the romantic drama film Love Story (1970). The song tells the story of a young man named William "Billy" Jacobs, who grows up fatherless with his mother, a recovering drug addict. Billy develops an ambition to become a "hustler" for money and respect. He sells drugs and steals to prove his credibility and soon tries to join a gang.

As part of his initiation, Billy joins the gang on a rooftop, where they brutally attack and gang rape a woman, covering her face with her shirt as well. He is then promised a spot in the gang if he shoots her in the head. He points the gun at her, but then pulls her shirt away from her face to see his own mother looking back at him, which causes him to jump from the rooftop to his death. The other gang members kill the woman and never speak about it again. The song ends with the narrator revealing that he was one of the gang members who participated in the act and is now convinced that Satan pursues him for it to this day, warning the listener, "So when the Devil wants to dance with you, you better say never / Because a dance with the Devil might last you forever."

The second part of the song is a hidden track featuring a verse from American rapper Diabolic. It samples the first movement of Sonata No. 3 for Viola da Gamba and Harpsichord in G Minor by Johann Sebastian Bach.

== Interpretation and true story claims ==
Immortal Technique has addressed the meaning behind the song and questions concerning the truth of the story on many occasions. In a 2004 interview with Brown Pride, he said, "It was a true story that I made myself more of a part of when I wrote the song. It became an urban legend and what's sick is that people thought it was about rape and it was really about how we are killing ourselves and destroying the most valuable resource that the Latino/Black community has: our women."

In a 2012 interview with Montreality, Immortal Technique said that "the only thing [he] changed about that story was [him] being on the roof" and that he never actually raped a woman nor was complicit in the act. In a 2022 interview with Bootleg Kev, he again maintained his innocence and the veracity of the story, stating that he can even take people to the building in Harlem where the incident happened.

Immortal Technique has often claimed that crimes similar to those depicted in the song happen every day in every country and city.

== Reception ==
Complex placed the song at No. 10 on their list of "The 25 Most Violent Rap Songs of All Time". The third verse of the song was ranked at No. 4 on Highsnobiety's list of "The 25 Scariest Rap Verses". In a 2020 interview with HipHopDX, Immortal Technique discussed the impact that "Dance with the Devil" had on his career, being one of his most famous songs.
