= You Already Know (album) =

Studio album by Agallah
- Released: August 8, 2006
- Recorded: 2006
- Studio: The Work Room (New York, NY)
- Genre: Hip-hop
- Length: 1:07:36
- Label: Purple City; Babygrande
- Producer: Shiest Bubz "The Emperor" (exec.); Agallah; Alchemist; Big Zik; DJ Premier; Grimy Kid; Sid Roams

Agallah chronology
Wrap Your Lips Around This (1995)	You Already Know (2006)	BO: The Legend Of The Water Dragon (2016)

Singles from You Already Know
- 1. "Club Hoppin' / Hardcore / Built For This" Released: 2006

Professional ratings
Review scores
Source	Rating
AllHipHop	3.5/5 stars
HipHopDX	2/5
RapReviews	7.5/10

You Already Know is the debut solo studio album by American Brooklyn-based rapper and record producer "The Don Bishop" Agallah p.k.a. 8-Off the Assassin. It was released on August 8, 2006, through Purple City Entertainment and Babygrande Records. Recording sessions took place at the Work Room in New York. Production was handled primarily by Agallah himself, along with The Alchemist, Big Zik, DJ Premier, Grimy Kid, and Sid Roams, with Shiest Bubz serving as executive producer. It features guest appearances from Ike Eyes, Big V, Carl Anthony, Clutch, Dead Prez, Kool G Rap, The Alchemist, Umi and Prodigy. The album was supported by the two singles: "Club Hoppin'" and "New York Ryder Music".

== Track listing ==
No.	Title	Writer(s)	Producer(s)	Length
1.	"Look at You Now" (Intro)	A. Aguilar	Agallah	3:18
2.	"In the Ghetto" (featuring Ike Eyes and M-1)	A. Aguilar; I. Mendoza; L. Alford	Agallah	3:09
3.	"Hardcore"	A. Aguilar	Agallah	4:41
4.	"Losing My Mind" (featuring Carl Anthony)	A. Aguilar; C. Anthony	Agallah	3:27
5.	"Artificial Love" (featuring Umi and stic.man)	A. Aguilar; U. Niilampti; C. Gavin	Agallah	4:33
6.	"New York Ryder Music"	A. Aguilar; C. Martin	DJ Premier	3:39
7.	"What's Hood?"	A. Aguilar	Agallah	2:38
8.	"Ride Out (O.G.G.G.)" (featuring The Alchemist)	A. Aguilar; A. Maman	The Alchemist	3:33
9.	"Yeah Baby" (featuring Ike Eyes)	A. Aguilar; I. Mendoza; M. Zikry	Agallah; Big Zik	3:53
10.	"Words from Prodigy (of Mobb Deep)"	A. Johnson		0:20
11.	"Built for This" (featuring Ike Eyes)	A. Aguilar; I. Mendoza	Agallah	3:30
12.	"I'm Gettin' Money"	A. Aguilar	Agallah	3:25
13.	"On the Ave"	A. Aguilar; A. Maman	Agallah; The Alchemist	4:44
14.	"Right Now!" (featuring Kool G Rap)	A. Aguilar; N. Wilson; Grimy Kid	Agallah; Grimy Kid	3:25
15.	"Club Hoppin'"	A. Aguilar; I. Mendoza	Agallah	4:22
16.	"Can You Dig It?"	A. Aguilar	Agallah	2:56
17.	"Take Me Back"	A. Aguilar; T. Graham; J. Chavez	Sid Roams	2:49
18.	"Mama (Mom R.I.P.)" (featuring Big V and Clutch)	A. Aguilar; V. Tisdale; R. Wilson	Agallah	4:36
19.	"Cry for Help"	A. Aguilar	Agallah	4:38
Total length:				1:07:36
