= Temperamento =

Puerto Rican musician

- Born: Christian Estremera Ramos
- Origin: Puerto Rico
- Genres: Christian hip hop, hip hop, rap, urban
- Occupation: Rapper
- Years active: 1999–present

Christian Estremera Ramos, known as Temperamento, is a Puerto Rican born Rap artist living in Providence, Rhode Island.

== Early years ==
Temperamento was born in Ponce, Puerto Rico. At the age of 10 after the suicide of his father, Temperamento and his family moved to Providence, Rhode Island.

== Early music career ==
Temperamento began writing rap songs in 1999. In 2005 Temperamento met Caracas Nel, a Venezuelan living in Rhode Island that would eventually become his music manager. Despite not being signed to a record label, Temperamento quickly gained attention from fans of Spanish language rap music due to his sound and controversial subject matters.

Producer SPK, best known as producer of the Reggaeton song 'Oye Mi Canto', offered Temperamento the opportunity to appear on his first album with Gemstar & Big Mato's "Mas Pure." The song, which featured popular Hispanic artists such as Tony Touch and N.O.R.E, was a commercial success. Temperamento recorded several albums from 2005 to 2010, with individual music videos garnering hundreds of thousands of views on YouTube.

== Incarceration and conversion to Christianity ==
In 2010, Temperamento was sentenced to 27 months in prison for having committed an armed robbery one and a half years prior to the sentencing. A month before he began serving his prison sentence, Temperamento received online messages from his fans stating that God had a plan for his life. During that time period, the artist reflected on the cover of his most recent album El M.E.J.O.R, in which he was depicted as a gold pharaoh. Temperamento considered his self-depiction as a form of idolatry, and began to have stronger faith in God.

Prior to his incarceration, Temperamento did not have traditional Christian beliefs. For several years prior to his imprisonment, the artist was a practitioner of the Afro-Cuban religion Santeria. Shortly after his release from prison in 2011, Temperamento began writing and performing rap music with strong Christian themes. His first music video was titled "Abre Tu Corazon" (Open Your Heart), and represented the artist's transition from gangster rapper to Christian rapper.

== Album Bajo Control ==
During the years 2011 and 2012, Temperamento developed Christian-themed rap songs in Spanish for his album Bajo Control. In August 2012, the rapper released a video titled "Mensaje Para el Mundo" (Message to the World), which he describes as a wake-up call to music fans. The video emphasizes faith in God during times of difficulty, which range from natural disasters, to the impact of the Illuminati. Temperamento described releasing the video as a cathartic experience, and that it also served to show his fans that he himself is not free from sin. Bajo Control is tentatively scheduled for a 2012 release.

== Discography ==
- 2005: Lo Que La Calle Esperaba
- 2006: Cadena Perpetua
- 2007: Hip Hop For Dummies Vol.1 & 2
- 2008: El Fin Del Mundo
- 2009: El M.E.J.O.R (Muchos Enemigos Juran Odiar Al Rey)
- TBA: Bajo Control
