= Purple City Productions =

American hip hop group

- Founded: 2000
- Founder: Timothy Parson (Shiest Bub)
- Distributors: Koch Records, Babygrande Records
- Genre: Hip-hop
- Country of origin: US
- Location: Harlem, New York

Purple City Productions (also known as Purple City Entertainment or simpliy Purple City) is a Harlem-based hip-hop production house, collective, and record label. The first associated artists include the aforementioned label's founder Shiest Bub, Agallah, Un Kasa & E-Norm. In more recent years the roster has extended to include artists such as Smoke DZA, A-Mafia, Streets da Block, Den10, Smoke & Numbers and Doe Boy Choch.

Purple City released multiple mixtapes in the early 2000s before signing a deal with Babygrande Records in 2004. Through Babybgrande, they released a compilation of earlier mixtape tracks and three new albums.

== History ==
Purple City, also known as PCP or Purple City Productions, is closely affiliated with other Harlem-based artists such as the Diplomats. Purple City began in 2001 when Shiest Bub met Cam'Ron of the Diplomats at a shoe store. After exchanging numbers and weed, a connection was made. Shiest had the Purple, and soon enough Shiest was running around with Dip Set and Purple City was born. Cam'Ron served as mentors to Shiest, leading him to create Purple City and began to put out mixtapes. After signing a deal with Babygrande, Purple City released a compilation of mixtape tracks: Road to the Riches: The Best of the Purple City Mixtapes (2005). Later in 2005 they released two studio albums: The Purple Album and Paris to Purple City, the latter a collaboration with French artists. In 2006 they released Born to the Purple.

== Former members ==
- Un Kasa
- Agallah
- E-Norm
- Smoke DZA
- Mike Boogie

== Discography ==
=== Albums ===
- Road to the Riches: The Best of the Purple City Mixtapes (March 8, 2005)
- The Purple Album (October 18, 2005)
- Paris to Purple City (November 8, 2005)
- Born to the Purple (May 23, 2006)

=== Mixtapes ===
- Gladiator (Hosted by Cormega (July 09, 2003)
- The Incredible Piff
- The Purple City Family in Candyland
- Shiest Bub-z Presents: The Color Purple
- Shiest Bub-z Presents: Summer Grind
- Shiest Bub-z & DJ Mo Sticky Presents: Bubble Music
- Shiest Bub-z Presents The Matrix 2: Vol. 4 Reloaded Hosted by. Juelz Santana
- Shiest Bub-z Presents The Price Is Right
- Shiest Bub-z Presents The Need for Weed
- Shiest Bub-z Presents: Every Daze My Birthday
- Shiest Bub-z The Matrix Hosted by Cam'ron
