= Revolutionary Vol. 1 =

Studio album by Immortal Technique
- Released: September 14, 2001
- Recorded: 1999–2001
- Genres: Hip-hop, underground hip-hop, political hip-hop
- Length: 57:58
- Labels: 1st edition: Self released, then Viper Records; Fontana, Nature Sounds
- Producers: Immortal Technique, SouthPaw, Akir, Jean Grae, Marley Marl, Rheturik, 44 Caliber

Immortal Technique chronology
| Revolutionary Vol. 1 (2001) | Revolutionary Vol. 2 (2003) |

Revolutionary Vol. 1 is the debut album by rapper Immortal Technique, released on September 14, 2001, and re-pressed in 2004 (by Babygrande Records). The first edition had no distribution and no barcode; it was sold by the artist on the streets and at his shows. The album re-press was manufactured with a barcode and is being distributed worldwide by Viper Records and Babygrande Records. Immortal Technique said in 2009 that the album had sold more than 45,000 copies.

== Cover art ==
The album cover features a stylized scene of massacred police officers, with a variation on the communist hammer and sickle symbol, with a microphone replacing the hammer. "Immortal Technique" is sprawled across the cover in graffiti-style writing.

== Reception ==
Professional ratings
Review scores
| Source | Rating |
|---|---|
| Allmusic | 3.5/5 stars |
| RapReviews | 4/5 stars |

Stewart Mason of AllMusic gave the album a score of three-and-a-half stars out of five. He praised Immortal Technique for being able to fit complicated political themes convincingly to music. Mason wrote that listeners may not approve of the production quality, but noted that it had a "rough-edged charm" to it.

Writing on RapReviews in November 2005, Steve 'Flash' Juon responded positively to the album, calling Immortal Technique "a smooth flowing, rough hewn vocalist with an excellent sense of timing and breath control" and judging the production as "good to outstanding".

== Track listing ==
| No. | Title | Producer | Length |
|---|---|---|---|
| 1. | "Creation & Destruction" | Marley Marl, J-Force | 3:09 |
| 2. | "Dominant Species" | Rheturik | 3:47 |
| 3. | "Positive Balance" (featuring Big Zoo) | 44 Caliber | 3:17 |
| 4. | "The Getaway" | South Paw, Akir | 2:41 |
| 5. | "Beef & Broccoli" | Jean Grae | 2:05 |
| 6. | "No Me Importa" | 44 Caliber | 3:56 |
| 7. | "Top of the Food Chain (Remix)" (featuring Poison Pen) | Stelf Index | 3:22 |
| 8. | "The Poverty of Philosophy" | Southpaw | 6:13 |
| 9. | "Revolutionary" | Jean Grae | 5:10 |
| 10. | "Spend Some Time" (Remix) | G. Bennet | 0:57 |
| 11. | "Dance with the Devil" (featuring Diabolic; includes hidden track) | 44 Caliber | 9:39 |
| 12. | "The Prophecy" | 44 Caliber | 3:15 |
| 13. | "Understand Why" | A. Cohen | 0:46 |
| 14. | "No Mercy" | 44 Caliber | 3:27 |
| 15. | "The Illest" | 44 Caliber | 3:33 |
| 16. | "Speak Your Mind" | Immortal Technique | 2:33 |

- "Dance with the Devil" ends at 6:48. An untitled hidden track featuring Diabolic starts at 6:57 and lasts for 2:42.

== Samples ==
- "Creation & Destruction" samples the song "The Letter" from the album Green Is Blues by Al Green.
- "Positive Balance" samples "Ice Dance" from the movie soundtrack for Edward Scissorhands by Danny Elfman and "Hypnotize" by The Notorious B.I.G.
- "No Me Importa" samples the song "Comin' Home Baby" by Herbie Mann.
- "Dance with the Devil" samples "Survival of the Fittest" by Mobb Deep, "Love Story" by Francis Lai, and "Think (About It)" by Lyn Collins; The hidden track version with Diabolic also contains a sample of "Sonata for Viola and Harpsichord - 1st Mvt" by Johann Sebastian Bach.
- "No Mercy" samples The Ballot or the Bullet" by Malcolm X and "Yuri Escapes" by Maurice Jarre.
- "The Illest" samples "Change the Beat (Female Version)" by Beside and "Swan Lake Suite (Op.20)" by Pyotr Ilyich Tchaikovsky
