= Dujeous =

American hip hop group

Dujeous is a live hip-hop band based in New York City. Dujeous songs are a diverse mix of topics, but they often talk about life in New York City ("City Limits", "New York Views"), post-millennial paranoia ("Sometimes", "It's..."), and sometimes, just having a good time ("Good Green," "Drowsy"). Their music has been featured on television (the theme to Crank Yankers, for example) and big screen (scoring Universal Pictures film Blue Crush). They've recently been promoting their weekly "No Clearance" free downloads, and leaks from their second album Day In Day Out.

== Members ==
The band consists of seven main members:

Mojo the Cinematic (Loren Hammonds)
Born and raised in the East Harlem neighborhood of Manhattan (as he says in the title track of City Limits). He has collaborated with Immortal Technique, Akir, Delta, Aesop Rock, Vast Aire of Cannibal Ox, producer Omen, and many others. Mojo is also working on a solo album, titled Blackademic.

Rheturik (Aaron Jones)
Born and raised in Uptown Manhattan, Rheturik is the group's second MC. He attended Philadelphia's University of Pennsylvania as an undergraduate, where he was roommates with R&B singer John Legend and producer Devo Springsteen. Rheturik also produced "Dominant Species" on Immortal Technique's Revolutionary Vol. 1.

Mas D (David Kupferstein)
Also an Uptown Manhattan native, MasD is Dujeous' third MC and is the son of Jamaican and Jewish immigrants. Mas D is also a photographer and designer, and is responsible for much of the group's artwork, such as album covers, single covers, and flyers.

Taylormade (born Taylor Rivelli)
Taylormade is the group's guitarist and its main producer. He was raised in the Washington Heights neighborhood of Manhattan. He is the group's primary recording engineer. As a producer, Taylormade has also worked with Saigon, Rhymefest, Nipsey Hussle, John Legend, Sharon Jones, MTV2, Kardinal Offishall, Dip Set, Nas, Keith Murray, HBO, BET and many more.

Dave Guy
Manhattan native Dave Guy is Dujeous' trumpeter. He toured with Amy Winehouse. He is a member of Daptone Records funk bands the Dap-Kings, Sugarman 3, Menahan Street Band, and Budos Band, and is first trumpeter in Charles Tolliver's Big Band. He has also played for Mark Ronson, Nancy Sinatra, Wynton Marsalis, and Lily Allen.

Tomek (Tomek Gross)
Tomek, is the group's drummer and one of its producers. He is also known for singing on certain Dujeous songs and onstage. He has also produced for NYC rapper Subconscious, and is a founding member of New York electronica group WIldlife.

Apex (Alex Gale)
Apex is the group's bassist and one of its producers. He has also produced for underground MCs Akir and Subconscious.

== Early years ==
Dujeous first came together in its current lineup in the late 90s, while the members were in high school. All of the members attended either Hunter College High School or LaGuardia School for the Performing Arts, both public high schools located in Manhattan. The three vocalists attended elementary school together, which is where they conceived the word Dujeous, which they have claimed is a "shape-shifting word" that means "all things good" in various interviews.

Dujeous got its start at high school talent shows and then moved on to small venues throughout the city. Their first show was at the Harlem School of the Arts. Dujeous' first received radio airplay on the Stretch Armstrong & Bobbito radio show on 89.9 WKCR-FM.

== City Limits ==
After playing shows in the NYC area and releasing products independently, Dujeous released City Limits, their first internationally distributed full-length release. The album garnered attention in the New York Daily News, The Source magazine (in which they were featured in the Unsigned Hype column, which also brought Biggie Smalls, Common, Eminem, and many other notable rap groups to fame), Time Out New York, and Urb (which named the group one of the Top 100 new artists of the year).

2004 also saw Dujeous travel the globe in support of City Limits. They toured France and Poland, and also reached the West Coast and Midwest for the first time.

== TV and Movies ==
Dujeous music has been featured in many television shows and movies. They produced and cowrote the theme song for MTV2's Crank Yankers with Chicago MC Rhymefest. Their music has also been featured in TNT's Saved, Universal Pictures film Blue Crush, and many other notable shows and movies (see discography).

== Discography (partial) ==
For full discography, see external links.

2009

- No Clearance (mixtape)

2008

- "Break Bread" b/w "Research" (digital single release)

2007

- Game 7 (mixtape)
- album, TBA, forthcoming

2006

- Live at Southpaw (CD, live album)
- Half Nelson Soundtrack (“Sometimes”)
- Mojo, The Cinematic Advances (mixtape)

2005

- AOL mixtape
- Live in Warsaw (CD, live album)

2004

- City Limits (CD, 2xLP)
- Sometimes b/w The Rules (12)
- Good Green b/w City Limits & The Wrench & The Chain

2003

- Heavy Traffic Mix Tapes I and II (CD)
- The Bastard EP (EP)
- As Promised (CD)

2002

- Spilt Milk b/w All MCs (12")

1999

- Breathtaking? b/w Epic Proportions & Cinematics (12)

1998

- Wax Pos Greatest Hits (tape)

1997

- Live in the Studio (tape)

1996

- Leading by Example (tape)

1995

- "New York Views" b/w "Expo" (exclusive)

=== Dujeous Featured Recordings ===
2007

- Lily Allen, “Smile” (Mark Ronson RMX) feat. Mojo & Dave Guy

2006

- Akir, Legacy, "Legacy," feat. Mas D & Mojo
- Akir, Legacy, No Longer My Home, feat. Mojo,
- Akir, Legacy, Louisiana Purchase, feat. Mojo
- Delta, The Lostralian, The Greater Good, feat. Mojo

2005

- EQ f. Mojo, "Follow Through"
- EQ f. Mojo, "Groupie"

2003

- Rob Swift, Sound Event, Salsa Scratch feat. D-Styles & Bob James, Dave Guy (trumpet)
- Rob Swift, Sound Event, The Caper, Dujeous
- Rob Swift, Sound Event, The Ghetto, Dujeous

1999

- Mr. Len feat. Dujeous, Hidden Jewels, Sightlines
- Rob Swift, The Ablist, All That Scratching
- Rob Swift, The Ablist, Modern Day Music

=== Dujeous Production/Songwriting ===
2007

- Mark Ronson, Versions, several songs co-written by Dave Guy & Apex

2006

- Akir, Legacy, "Legacy," prod. by Apex

2005

- Nas feat.Saigon, War Remix, co-prod. by Taylormade, featured in HBOs Entourage
- Purple City, "Gun Go" feat. Jim Jones & Juelz Santana, prod. by Taylormade & Dujeous
- Keith Murray, "Swagger Back", He's Keith Murray, co-written by Taylormade
- Beetroot, 13, co-written by Apex

2003

- Immortal Technique, Revolutionary Vol. 1, Dominant Species, prod. by Rheturik

2002

- Mojo & Subconscious, "The Angel & The Insect," prod. by Apex

=== Dujeous Session Work ===
2007

- Mark Ronson, Versions, several songs, Dave Guy (trumpet) & Apex (bass)
- Amy Winehouse, Back to Black, several songs, Dave Guy (trumpet)
- Charles Tolliver, With Love, Dave Guy (trumpet)

2006

- Rhymefest, Sista, produced by Mark Ronson, Apex (bass)
- Mark Ronson, untitled forthcoming album, Apex (bass) & Dave Guy (trumpet)
- Akir, Legacy, Homeward Bound," Dave Guy (trumpet)
- Akir, Legacy, This Is Your Life," Apex (bass)

2005

- Sharon Jones & The Dap Kings, Naturally, Dave Guy (trumpet)
- Ladybug Mecca, Trip The Light Fantastic, Children Say, Oh Poor You, You Never Get It, Apex (bass)

2004

- Immortal Technique, Revolutionary Vol. 2, Cause of Death, Taylormade (guitar, bass)
- Immortal Technique, Revolutionary Vol. 2, Internally Bleeding, Dave Guy (trumpet)

2003

- Rob Swift, Sound Event, Salsa Scratch feat. D-Styles Dave Guy & Bob James (trumpet)
- Rob Swift, Sound Event, The Caper, (bass, guitar, trumpet, co-writing)
- Rob Swift, Sound Event, The Ghetto, (bass, trumpet, co-writing)

2002

- Lil Stef, "Misdemeanor," prod. by Kanye West, (bass, guitar, trumpet)

=== Film, Television, and Multimedia ===
2007

- Crank Yankers (TV series, MTV 2), theme song
- Hip-Hop: Beyond Beats & Rhymes, (documentary, PBS), several songs featured in score

2006

- Final Fight: Streetwise, video game, Capcom: City Limits, Its, and First/Last featured in score, album image featured in game
- Half Nelson, feature film, Hunting Lane/Think Films: Sometimes featured in score and soundtrack
- Andy Milonakis: Season 1, TV series on DVD, MTV: Good Green, Sometimes, and Its featured in score
- Entourage, TV series, HBO: Nas feat. Saigon War Remix featured in score

2005

- Ultimate Hustler, TV series, BET: background scoring
- Kings & Queen, feature film, Wellspring Films: Spilt Milk featured in score

2004

- Soul Purpose, feature film, Teton Gravity: Good Green featured in score

2003

- The Life, TV series, ESPN: background scoring
- Just Another Story, feature film, Showtime: Spilt Milk featured in score

2002

- Blue Crush, feature film, Universal Films: Move and Sightlines featured in score

2001

- Lift, feature film Showtime Networks: All MCs featured in score
- PSA, Partnership for a Drug-Free America/MTV: scoring
- Paper Soldiers, feature film, Roc-a-Fella Films: scoring

1999

- Song for Celia, feature film: scoring
- Featured band, www.levis.com Web Launch
