= Hasan Salaam =

American rapper

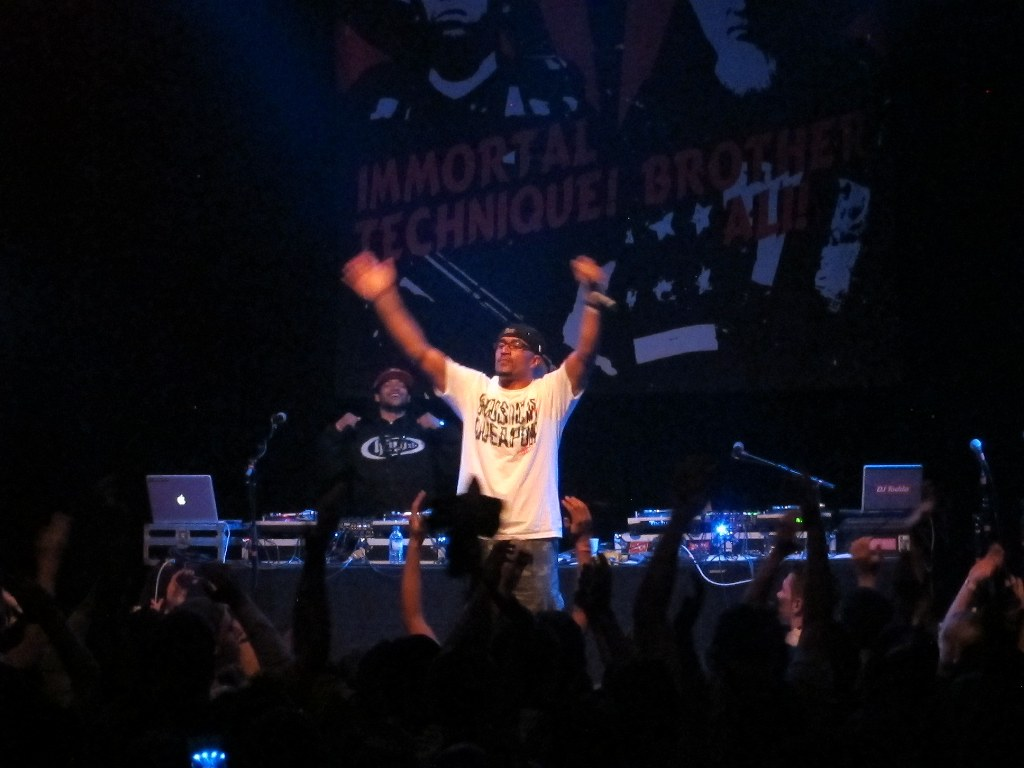
- Salaam performing in 2013

Background information
- Born: January 12, 1981 (age 45)
- Origin: New Jersey, US
- Genres: Hip hop
- Occupations: Musician, Songwriter, Hip hop producer
- Instruments: Rapping, Beatboxing, MPC 2000xl
- Years active: 2003-Present
- Website: https://hasansalaam.bandcamp.com/

Hasan Salaam (born January 12, 1981) is an American rapper and sex educator born in New York City and raised in New Jersey. His lyrics touch on such subjects as "post-colonial exploitation of African (hip-hop) culture", "the African diaspora".

== Early life ==
Salaam started rapping at the age of 10. After seeing a preview for the movie Malcolm X in 1992 he read the Autobiography of Malcolm X, which inspired him.

== Musical career ==
In 2005 he won an award for Best Live Performance and Best Underground Song of the Year for the song "Blaxploitation" from his debut album Paradise Lost at the third Annual Underground Music Awards. Together with HiCoup, Rugged N Raw, Impaq and Badsportt he is a member of the group 5th Column. Salaam featured on the UK Hip hop group Mecca2Medina's Truthseekers album in 2006. He has also toured internationally.

Salaam has been described as having "the powerful delivery of Chuck D, the racial love of Mos Def, the instructional attitude of Krs-One, and the anger of Immortal Technique." Salaam's third album proper, Children of God, was released in 2008, featuring guest appearances from Lord Jamar, Masta Ace and Salaam's 5th Column crew. Exclaim! described the album as "well rounded" and "handled superbly", saying that Salaam has a voice that is "trained like an instrument, commands attention". Children of God has been described as " themed deeply in all religions", and was described by HipHopDX as possibly "the new archetype in what religious-minded rap can be".

== Adult film career ==
Salaam performs in the adult film industry under the name King Noire. He entered the industry as a teenager, starting with a magazine shoot with a female friend who asked him to accompany her. Following this, he began performing in live sex shows and adult film. Salaam has been outspoken about the racism he believes is inherent in the industry, and has publicly refused work he has felt was discriminatory in nature in addition to his campaigns to address and end racism in pornography, which has included public lectures. He also began to promote and organize adult oriented events, including Fantasy Flight parties. He is a co-creator of Steel & Stilettos workout classes which are taught at his Body Altitudes gym. Salaam co-owns Body Altitudes, Royal Fetish Films and Jet Setting Jasmine with Jasmine Johnson.

== Charitable work ==
Hasan works with charities, non-profits, and youth all over the world. In November 2010, Hasan became the first U.S hip hop artist to ever perform in Guinea-Bissau. On this same trip he worked with the young artists, taught creative writing to the youth, and headlined a concert to promote freedom of speech. The “Music Is My Weapon” project is the next step, in an effort to provide change to a country that remains one of the poorest and least politically stable in the world. December 2011, Hasan Salaam released an EP "Music Is My Weapon" employing all profits to build a well, school, and clinic in Guinea-Bissau.

== Discography ==
- 5th Column Mixtape Vol.II (2004)
- Paradise Lost (2005) Day by Day Entertainment
- The Reavers Terra Firma (2005)
- Tales of the Lost Tribe: Hidden Jewels (2006)
- Children of God (2008) 5th Column Media
- Mohammad Dangerfield – "Mohammad Dangerfield" (self-titled) (2011)
- "Music Is My Weapon" (2011)
- Life in Black and White (2014)
