= DJ Green Lantern =

American DJ and producer (born 1975)

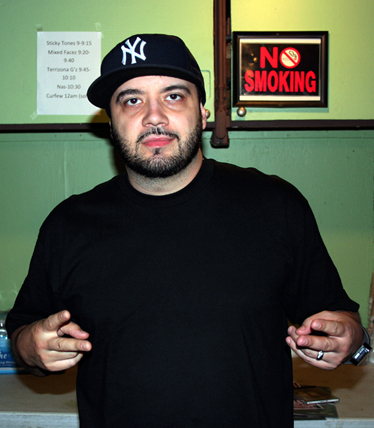
- DJ Green Lantern in 2010

Background information
- Born: James Christopher D'Agostino; July 7, 1975 (age 51)
- Origin: Rochester, New York, U.S.
- Genre: Hip hop
- Occupations: Disc jockey; record producer
- Labels: AV8; Shady; Team Invasion

James Christopher D'Agostino (born July 7, 1975), known professionally as DJ Green Lantern, is an American hip hop DJ and producer from Rochester, New York. In 2002, D'Agostino was signed by American rapper Eminem, to become the official DJ for Shady Records, after DJ Head stepped down for undisclosed reasons.

== Biography ==
=== Rise to fame ===
DJ Green Lantern came to prominence in the late 1990s–early 2000s with his signature brand of mixtapes. The creativity of these tapes caught the ear of many industry power players, one of which was Eminem. The first set of officially sponsored mixtapes from Eminem's Shady Records. On the series, spanning three mixtapes (later to be spun off into the Armageddon series), the DJ broke several diss records, furthering the issues between Eminem and Benzino/The Source, as well as the entire Shady camp and Ja Rule/Murder Inc.

He is also recognized as a producer, featuring on his own mixtapes several "Green Remixes," including, most notably, a remix of the Nas and Tupac Shakur collaboration, "Thugz Mansion." He also produced D-Block's "2 Guns Up", an acclaimed street single, which originated as a freestyle rap on his Hot 97 radio show, "In the Lab" (the most memorable of which has also appeared as a mixtape, "The Best of In the Lab"). "In the Lab" is formatted as a one-hour (with commercials) mix show, in which DJ Green Lantern blends a cappella and instrumental tracks from various artists, as well as breaking new and underground music (such as the Ghostface Killah and El-Producto collaboration "HideYaFace").

==== "Bin Laden" ====
D'Agostino also produced Ludacris' "Number One Spot," the second single from his album The Red Light District, and Immortal Technique's "Bin Laden" single, which blames the Reagan Doctrine and U.S. President George W. Bush for the September 11, 2001 attacks.

=== With the Shady Records family ===
As a member of the Shady Records family, D'Agostino also hosted a show on Eminem's Sirius Satellite Radio channel, Shade 45, along with an accompanying mixtape named "Shady Times: Invasion Part I," released in the fall of 2004. As Eminem's DJ, D'Agostino was responsible for touring with him and spinning at shows such as the Shady National Convention and The Game's album release party. D'Agostino's much anticipated album Armageddon was set to be released under Shady Records, but controversy and an eventual parting would put the release in limbo.

=== Hip-Hop Nation ===
In summer 2007, D'Agostino returned to Sirius Satellite Radio on the Hip-Hop Nation channel. He hosts a show called The Invasion.

=== Bar Exam 2 ===
D'Agostino recently put together and mixed the highly anticipated Bar Exam 2 mixtape by acclaimed Detroit MC Royce da 5'9". Green took over for DJ Premier and Statik Selektah who hosted and mixed Royce's first Bar Exam Mixtape. The Bar Exam 2 was pushed back several times because of Green Lantern's inability to mix the tape due to his touring. After several stated released dates, Bar Exam 2 was finally released on September 15 as a free download on HipHopDX.com. Due to the high anticipation of the mixtape, Royce gave the mixtape the slogan "Happy Bar Exam 2, It's a Holiday" prior to its release.

=== Pulse of the People ===
D'Agostino collaborated with Dead Prez on their album, Pulse of the People: Turn Off The Radio, Vol. 3, released in June 2009

=== GTA IV ===
Together with Mister Cee, he is featured as host of the hip-hop radio station "The Beat 102.7" in the video game Grand Theft Auto IV. The station is essentially a parody of Hot 97. Instead of using existing songs, Green Lantern produced the songs exclusively for "The Beat 102.7".

== Discography ==
=== Mixtapes ===
- 1998 Superthug - The Jump Off Begins
- 1999 It's Just Us and The Guns
- 1999 Rookie of the Year
- 1999 Blaze
- 2001 New World Order
- 2002 New World Order pt. 2 - The Saga Continues
- 2002 Shady Times: Invasion Part I
- 2003 Invasion Part II: Conspiracy Theory
- 2004 Invasion Part Three: Countdown to Armageddon
- 2005 5 Star General
- 2005 New World Order
- 2006 New York State of Mind
- 2006 Throwback Classics, Vol. 1
- 2006 You'll See
- 2006 Team Invasion: Best of DJ Green Lantern and Dipset
- 2006 Pre-Release Therapy: The Truth Shall Set U Free (with Ludacris)
- 2007 Alive On Arrival
- 2007 Hood Rules Apply
- 2007 R.O.C. Stars Street Leak: American Gangster
- 2007 The Myspace Invasion
- 2007 I Produced That
- 2008 Grand Theft Auto IV: Liberty City Invasion [soundtrack]
- 2012 Invade the Game
- 2012 YAP EM
- 2012 IRENE (with Mitchelle'l)
- 2014 "Che Rhenosonce – Unforgettable Memories"
- 2017 Hitler On Steroids (with Westside Gunn)

==== Other releases ====
- DJ Green Lantern, Russell Simmons & Barack Obama: Yes We Can (The Mixtape)
- Grafh and DJ Green Lantern: The Oracle 2
- Royce da 5'9" and DJ Green Lantern: Bar Exam 2
- 07-07-08 (with Cassidy and Team Invasion)
- DJ Evil Dee & Green Lantern: Analog Mixtape Volume No. 2
- DJ Green Lantern and Immortal Technique: The 3rd World
- Charles Hamilton & DJ Green Lantern: Outside Looking
- Nas & DJ Green Lantern: The Nigger Mixtape
- Monster Mash Part 2
- Grow Season (with Wiz Khalifa)
- 07-07-07 (with Cassidy and DJ Thoro)
- The Myspace Invasion, Vol. 3
- Cocaine On Steroids (with N.O.R.E.)
- The Myspace Invasion, Vol. 2
- Respect the Shooter (with Uncle Murda)
- Monster Mash
- The Sirius Invasion
- Myspace Takeover (with Team Invasion)
- Say Uncle (with Uncle Murda)
- SMASH AND GRAB Mixtape (with ¡MAYDAY!)
- AND 1 Streetball – The Official Video Game Mixtape
- In the Kitchen (with DJ Khaled and Team Invasion)
- On My New York Shit (with DJ Kay Slay)
- This Ain't No Greezy Talk (with Team Invasion)
- The Internet Invasion (with Ghostface Killah)
- Fort Minor: We Major (with Mike Shinoda) (2005)
- Razor Tag (with Styles of Beyond) (2007)
- Ain't No Greezy Talk: Team Invasion Edition (with DVD / with Team Invasion)
- The Green Lantern Instrumentals (hosted by Team Invasion)
- Team Invasion Presents: Keyshia Cole
- The Best of Green Lantern and D-Block (hosted by Team Invasion)
- The Best of Green Lantern and Shady Records (hosted by Team Invasion)
- Shade 45: Sirius Bizness (hosted by Eminem)
- Public Enemy Number One (with Beanie Sigel)
- The Oracle (with Grafh)
- The Champ Is Here (with Jadakiss / hosted by Big Mike)
- Countdown to Armageddon 2: Back to the Lab (hosted by Dame Dash)
- The Best of In Da Lab, Vol. 1
- Rap Phenomenon II: 2Pac (with Dirty Harry and DJ Vlad)
- Invasion, Part 1
- Get in Where U Fit in (with the Young Gunz)
- The Chosen One
- Takin' it to the Streets
- Inherited Beef, Vol.1 (with Ronald)
- In Too Deep
- Coming of Age
- Millennium All-Stars (with DJs Tony Touch, Mister Cee, Ron G, Funkmaster Flex, Doo Wop, DJ Enuff, Spinbad, and DJ Dale)
- The Green Ghost Project (with Styles P)
- Man vs Many (with Nefew)
- Back to School EP (with Ronald)
- Cak-ill-ack Muzik (with Ben G)

== Singles produced ==
List of singles produced, with selected chart positions and certifications, showing year released and album name
| Title | Year | Peak chart positions | | | | | Certifications | Album |
| Title | Year | US | US R&B | US Rap | US Bubbling | UK | Certifications | Album |
|---|---|---|---|---|---|---|---|---|
| "Number One Spot" (Ludacris) | 2005 | 19 | 21 | 6 | — | 30 | | The Red Light District |
| "In the Ghetto" (Busta Rhymes featuring Rick James) | 2006 | — | 50 | — | — | — | | The Big Bang |
