= Agallah =

American rapper

- Also known as: 8-Off; 8-Off Agallah; Agallah Don Bishop; Swagallah
- Born: Angel Luis Aguilar; May 8, 1974 (age 51); New York City, U.S.
- Genres: Hip-hop
- Years active: 1993–present
- Labels: EastWest; Babygrande; Propain; Ingrooves/Fontana; Universal
- Formerly of: Purple City

Angel Luis Aguilar (born May 8, 1974), better known by his stage names Agallah is an American rapper and producer. He was a member of The Diplomats-affiliated group Purple City and he is the CEO of his label Propain Campaign. He was formerly known as 8-Off Agallah.

He has ghostwritten songs for many well-known artists. In addition to producing his own music, he also produced tracks for Busta Rhymes, Remy Ma, The Diplomats, Guru, Rockin' Squat, Sean Price, Saigon, Game Theory, PMD, Das Efx, and Mobb Deep. In 1995, he finished his debut album, Wrap Your Lips Around This, but it was never properly released because the album was shelved. In 2012, Wrap Your Lips Around This became available for digital download from Amazon.com and iTunes after being unreleased for many years.

== History ==
Agallah was born and raised in the Brownsville area of the Brooklyn borough of New York City, New York. Agallah started out as a producer, then turned to rhyming and released a major-label single on East West America/Elektra Records in 1995. In 1997, he featured on R.A. the Rugged Man's track "Till My Heart Stops" on the Rawkus Records Soundbombing compilation an underground classic. A collaboration with Mr. Cheeks of the Lost Boyz followed, although the album the single was to appear on, Wrap Your Lips Around This, was never released. Additionally, there were production stints for the likes of EPMD, Das EFX, Onyx, and Group Home. In 2000, Agallah recorded the Sesame Street-themed single "Crookie Monster," which featured production by The Alchemist.

A friendship with Shiest Bub led to the formation of Purple City Entertainment (also known as Purple City Productions) with Un Kasa, which attracted the attention of Dipset capo Jim Jones. In 2012, Agallah featured on rapper/producer Danny!'s seventh studio album Payback.

== Discography ==
=== Solo albums ===
- Wrap Your Lips Around This (November 21, 1995, EastWest) (as 8-Off)
- You Already Know (2006, Babygrande)
- Agalito's Way (2015, Propain Campain)
- Bo: The Legend of the Water Dragon (2016, Propain Campain)
- Agnum Opus (2017, The Order Label)
- Ag Al Ghul - No Mercy For The Weak (2018, The Order Label)
- Live At Your Own Risk (2019, Propain Compain)
- Fuck You: The Album - (2020, Propain Campain)
- Francisco Blanco (2021)
- Agstalgia (2021)
- 2021 (2021, Propain Campain)
- High Level Art (2021)
- High Level Art 2 - Blakeside Galleria (2021, Propain Campain)
- The Year Of The Tiger (2022, Propain Campain)
- Black Rich Port (2025, Propain Campain)

=== EPs and mixtapes ===
- Da Mixtape Iz da Album (2001)
- Show Up (2002) (as 8-Off Agallah)
- Doomsday (2004)
- Propane Piff (2006, Babygrande/Koch)
- Cakemix (2006, Propain Campain)
- Fuck a Purple Chain (2007)
- F.A.M.E. (2008, Propain Campain)
- Agobama The President (2008)
- '09 Is Mines (2009, Propain Campain)
- Forever Fire The EP (2012, Propain Campain)
- Agallah Presents Propain Campain Mixtape (2012, Propain Campain)
- The Red V (2013, Propain Campain)
- Propain Campain Presents Agallah The Instrumentals Vol.1 (2014, Propain Campain)
- The Life of Don Francis (Prelude To Agalito's Way) (2014, Propain Campain)
- Past and Present (2014, Propain Campain) (with The Alchemist)
- Don Status (2015, Propain Campain)
- Flight of the Cranes (2015, self-released) (with DirtyDiggs)
- 3-Day Theory (2017, The Order Label) (with Duke WestLake)
- Aggravated (2020, self-released)
- Black Anarchy Music (2020, Propain Campain)
- Darona (2020, Propain Campain)
- Darona 2 (2020, Propain Campain)
- 2021 (2021, self-released)

=== Singles ===
- "Ghetto Girl" (1995, EastWest) (as 8-Off)
- "Alize for Dolo" (1996, EastWest) (as 8-Off)
- "Crookie Monster" (1999, Game)
- "Rising to the Top" (featuring Sean Price) (2002, Game) (as 8-Off Agallah)
- "Imagine Your Life" (featuring Monie Love) (2002, Street Level) (as 8-Off Agallah)
- "New York Ryder Music" (2006, Babygrande)
- "Club Hoppin'" (2006, Babygrande)
- "Coat of Arms" (featuring Planet Asia, Rasco & Tristate) (2013, Propain Campain)
- "Slavery" (2016, Propain Campain)
