= Diabolic (rapper) =

American rapper

- Also known as: 'Bolic; Di
- Born: Sean Edward George
- Origin: Huntington Station, New York, US
- Genres: Hip hop; political hip hop; battle rap
- Occupation: Rapper
- Years active: 1999–present
- Labels: WarHorse; Coalmine; Viper
- Website: diabolichiphop.com

Sean Edward George, known by the stage name Diabolic, is an American rapper. He started receiving fame after his verse on Immortal Technique's song "Dance with the Devil". He is also a well-known battle rapper who has battled with rappers such as Immortal Technique, MC Jin, Mecca, Iron Solomon and Rhymefest, among others. He released The Foul Play Mixtape in October 2006.

In 2010, Diabolic released Liar & a Thief, which was produced by Engineer with the exception of the song "Riot" featuring Deadly Hunta, which was produced by John Otto of Limp Bizkit on live drums. The album featured guest appearances from Immortal Technique, Canibus, Vinnie Paz, and Ill Bill, and won the 2010 HHUG Album of the Year award.

== Discography ==
=== Albums ===
- Liar & a Thief (2010)
- Fightin' Words (2014)
- Collusion (with Vanderslice) (2019)
- The Disconnect (2019)

=== Mixtapes ===
- The Foul Play Mixtape (2006)

=== EPs ===
- Triple Optix EP (2000)
