= Immortal Technique =

American rapper (born 1978)

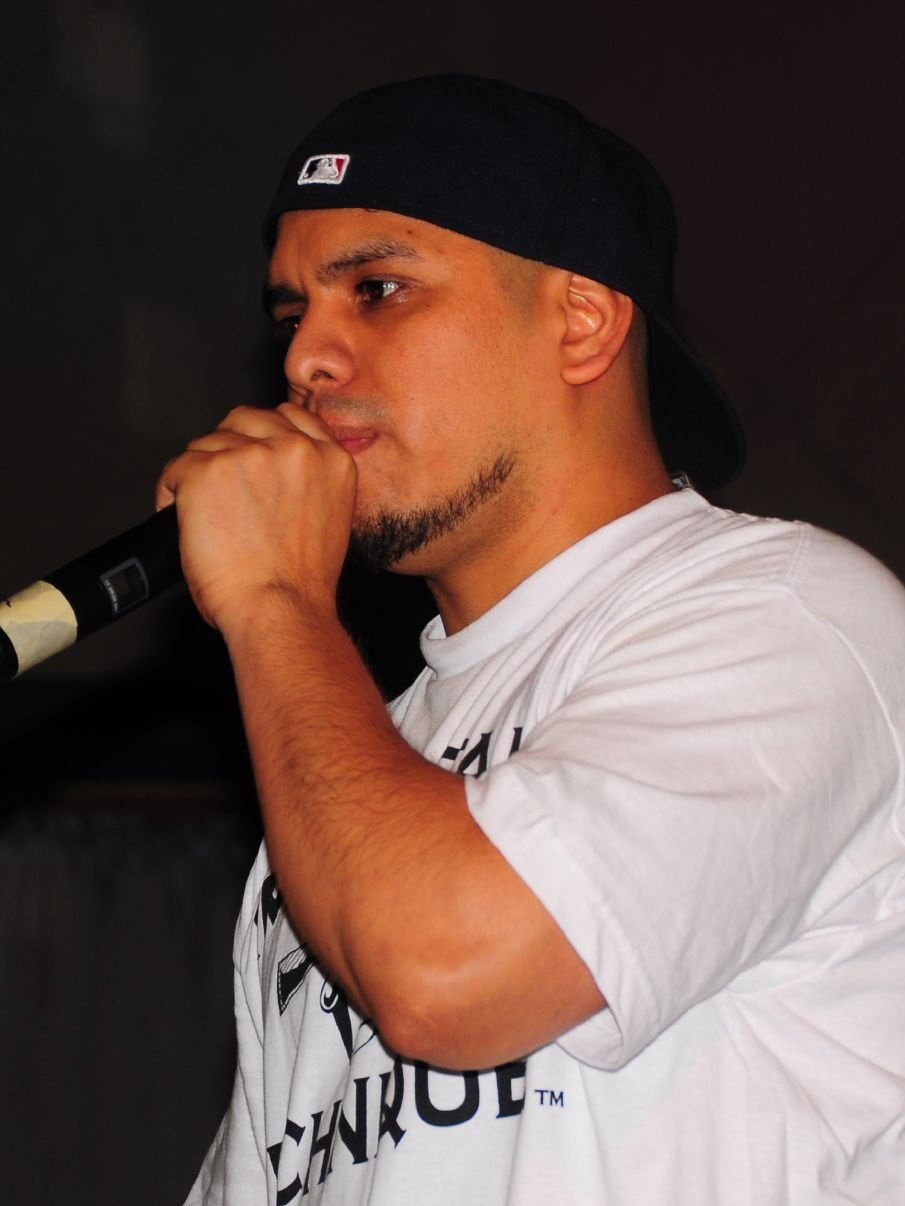
- Coronel performing in March 2010

Background information
- Born: Felipe Andres Coronel; February 19, 1978 (age 48); Lima, Peru
- Origin: New York City, U.S.
- Genres: East Coast hip-hop; underground hip-hop; political hip-hop; hardcore hip-hop
- Occupations: Rapper; songwriter; activist
- Years active: 2000–present
- Labels: Viper; Nature Sounds; Fontana; Babygrande
- Website: immortaltechnique.com

Felipe Andres Coronel (born February 19, 1978), better known by his stage name Immortal Technique, is an American rapper, songwriter, and activist of Afro-Peruvian descent. His lyrics largely feature commentary on issues such as politics, religion, institutional racism, socioeconomics and government conspiracies.

Immortal Technique seeks to retain control over his production, and has stated in his music that record companies profit the most from music over the artists themselves. He claimed in 2009 to have sold close to a combined total of 200,000 copies of his first three official releases.

== Early life ==
Felipe Andres Coronel was born in a military hospital in Lima on February 19, 1978, the son of a Peruvian mother and father. He also has African, Amerindian, French, Spanish ancestry. His family relocated to the Harlem neighborhood of New York City in 1980 to escape the Peruvian Civil War. During his teenage years, he was arrested multiple times due to what he later called "selfish and childish" behavior.

Coronel attended Hunter College High School, where his classmates included future political commentator Chris Hayes and future singer-songwriter Lin-Manuel Miranda; in 2016, Miranda revealed that Coronel bullied him at school, but the two are now friends. Coronel said, "We have always been very proud of each others' success, and we even joked about [this story] with each other on Twitter over the weekend. [...] I wouldn't want my supporters to get the impression that anyone was trying to normalize childish bullying, especially coming from someone who now fights for others." Shortly after enrolling in Pennsylvania State University, he was arrested and charged with assault-related offenses due to his involvement in an altercation between fellow students; the charges stemming from this incident led to him being incarcerated for a year.

After being paroled, Coronel took political science classes at Baruch College for two semesters at the behest of his father, who allowed Coronel to live with him on the condition that he went to school. Honing his rapping skills in jail, and unable to find decent employment after his release, he began selling his music on the streets of New York and participating in rap battles. This led to his reputation as a ferocious battle rapper.

== Musical career ==
=== 2000–2005: Revolutionary Vol. 1 and Revolutionary Vol. 2 ===
In 2001, Immortal Technique released his first album Revolutionary Vol. 1 without the help of a record label or distribution, instead using money earned from his rap battle triumphs. He also battled but lost to Posta Boy in 106 & Park's Freestyle Friday. Revolutionary Vol. 1 also contained the underground classic "Dance with the Devil". In November 2002, he was listed by The Source in its "Unsigned Hype" column, highlighting artists that are not signed to a record label. The following year, in September 2003, he received the coveted "Hip Hop Quotable" in The Source for a song entitled "Industrial Revolution" from his second album. Immortal Technique is the only rapper in history to have a "Hip Hop Quotable" while being unsigned. He released his second album Revolutionary Vol. 2 in 2003, which featured an intro and a spoken-word piece by death row inmate Mumia Abu-Jamal. In 2004 and 2005, Viper Records and Babygrande Records, respectively, re-released Immortal Technique's debut, Revolutionary Vol. 1, to make it available to a wider audience. "Point of No Return" from Revolutionary Vol 2 was used as the entrance theme for Rashad Evans during the UFC 88 main event between Chuck Liddell and Rashad Evans.

=== 2005–present: The 3rd World, The Martyr and The Middle Passage ===
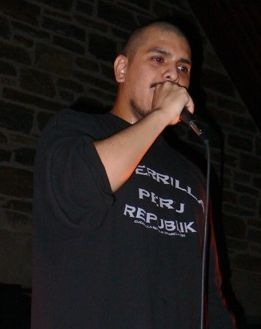
Immortal Technique performing in March 2006

Between 2005 and 2007 Immortal Technique began working on The Middle Passage and The 3rd World, the two albums that would serve a follow-up to Revolutionary Vol. 2. The 3rd World, produced by DJ Green Lantern, was released in 2008. Emilee Woods, writing for RapReviews.com, reviewed the album positively, praising its "earnestly and skillfully delivered" material, and claiming that Technique had "finally found a comfort zone in the balance between lyricism and message."

Immortal Technique was also featured on several movie soundtracks and video game soundtracks, all while touring. In October 2011, he released The Martyr, a free compilation album of previously unreleased material and new tracks.

In an interview in 2020 with Latino USA, Immortal Technique revealed that he was writing a book and creating a new album, but had faced setbacks because of the COVID-19 pandemic. He later assumed control of Viper Records and signed a distribution deal with Babygrande Records / E1 Entertainment to distribute his next album.

=== Collaborations ===
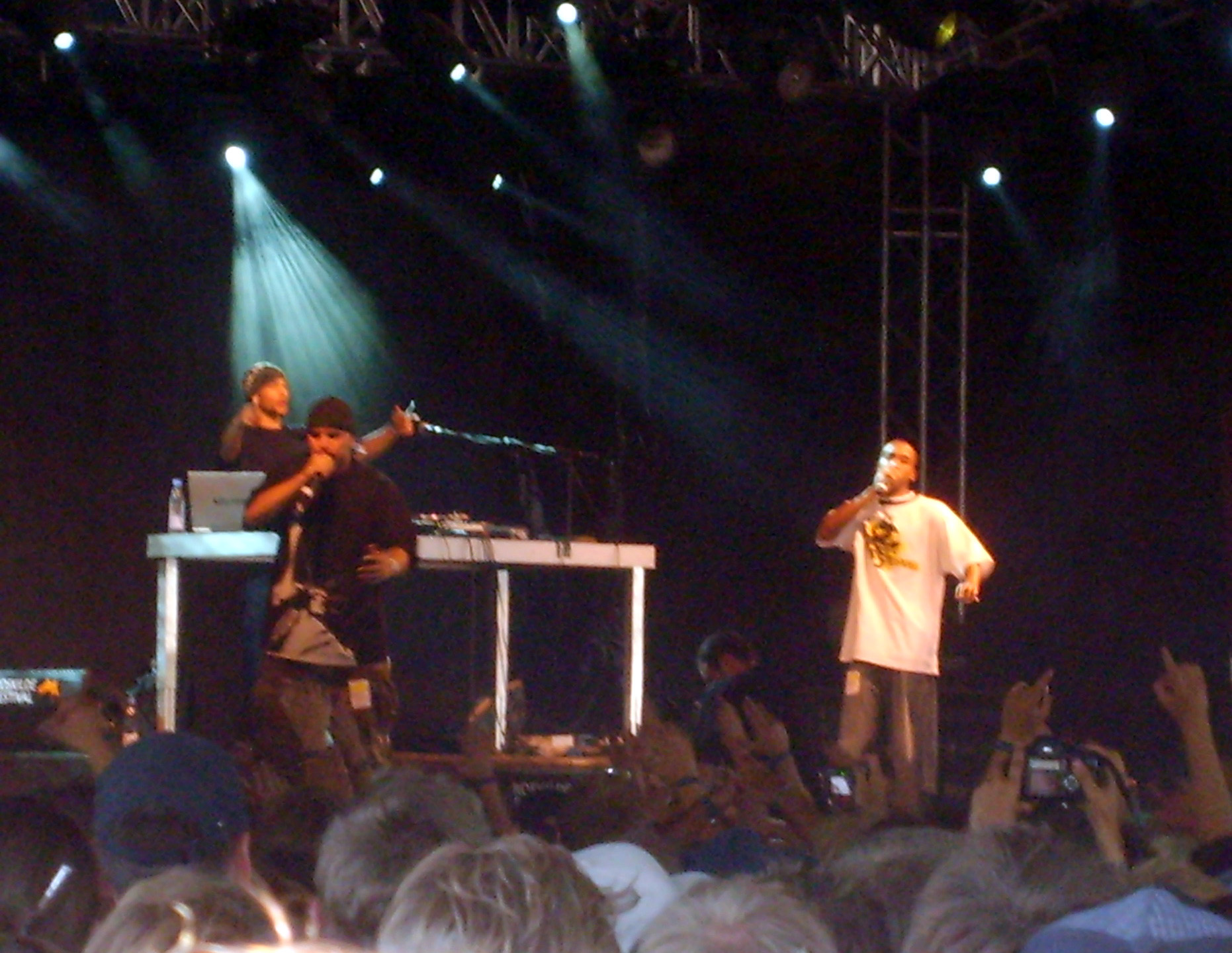
Immortal Technique (left) at the Roskilde Festival, 2006

The summer of 2005 saw the release of "Bin Laden", a vinyl single 12" featuring Mos Def and DJ Green Lantern. The single also contained a remix of the song featured Chuck D of Public Enemy and KRS-One. In early 2006, the song "Impeach the President", featuring Dead Prez and Saigon turned up in the mixtape "Alive on Arrival" DJ Green Lantern. This is a simple version of The Honeydrippers, 1973, in which Immortal Technique urged fans to organize a vote of censure against George W. Bush. In April 2009, a new song leaked on the internet named "Democratie Fasciste (Article 4)" by Brazilian-French rapper Rockin' Squat which featured Immortal Technique. The official release of the song and Rockin' Squat's album Confessions D'un Enfant Du Siècle Volume 2 was on May 12, 2009. The instrumental from the song was sampled from Wendy Rene's "After Laughter". The song expresses the inequalities of the Third World and revolutionary events throughout history against tyranny and oppression. It contains lyrics in English (Immortal Technique), French (Rockin' Squat) and brief shout outs in Spanish (Immortal Technique). This song is Immortal Technique's first official international collaboration.

In early 2009, it was announced that there would be a collaboration between Technique and UK underground artist Lowkey, on a single called "Voices of the Voiceless". On September 11, 2009, a "snippet" of the song was released on YouTube. The preview was released ahead of its September 21 launch on iTunes, as part of a web-campaign that included updates, promotion and links on forums, E-Magazines and several social networking sites. The song's lyrics cover a broad range of issues that are familiar to listeners of both artists – racism, world revolution, war, socialism, government control, rape, famine, colonialism, Classism, self-determination and the war in Iraq.

== Activism ==
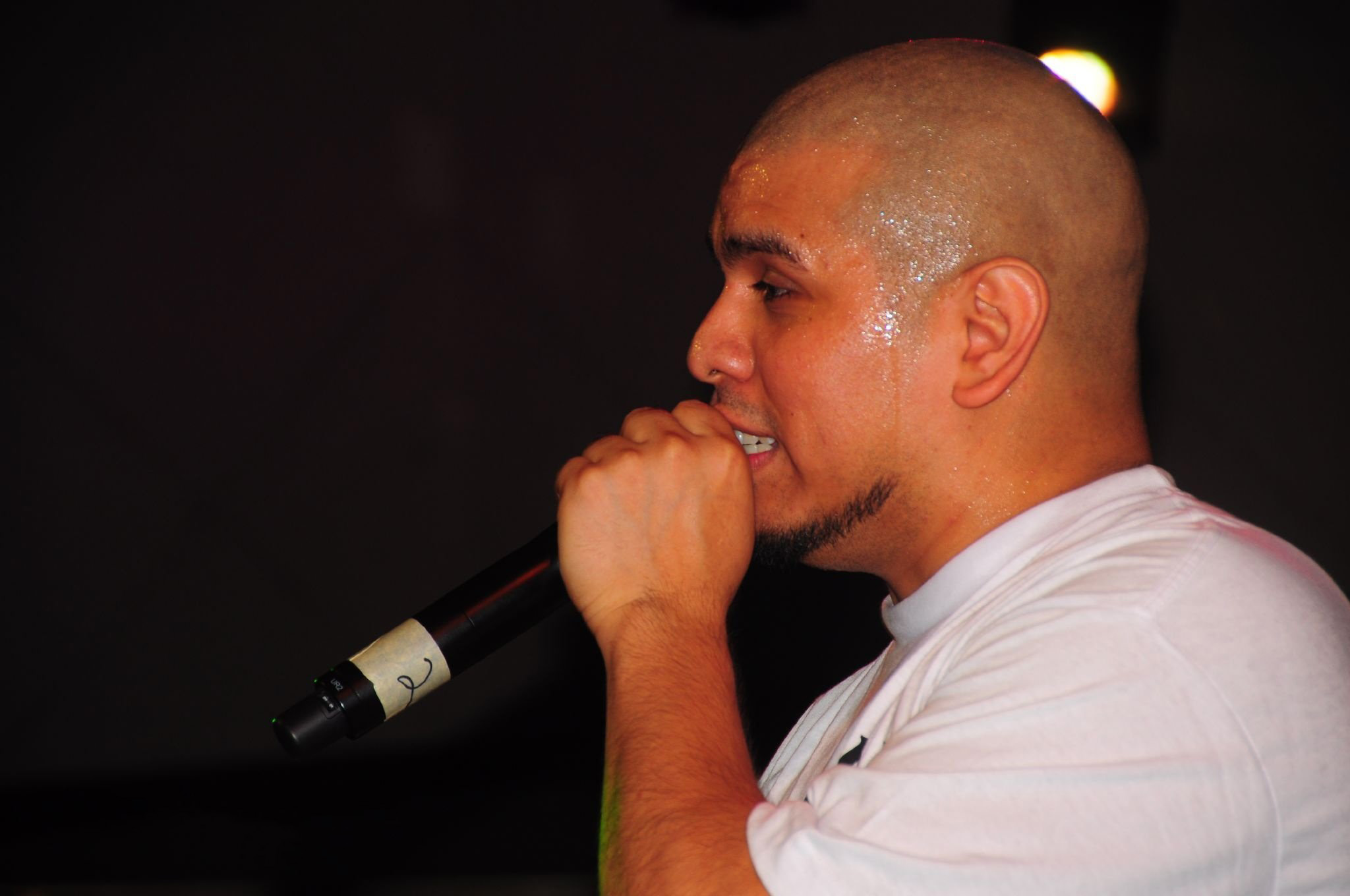
Immortal Technique performing in March 2010

Immortal Technique often visits prisons to speak to young inmates, works with immigrant rights activists, and raises money for children's hospitals overseas. He also created a writing grant program for high school students.

In June 2008, Immortal Technique partnered with non-profit human rights organization Omeid International to create The Green Light Project. With the profits of his album The 3rd World, he traveled to Afghanistan to help Omeid build an orphanage in Kabul called the Amin Institute, without corporate or external funding.

== Other work ==
A documentary about Immortal Technique, The (R)evolution of Immortal Technique, was released in September 2011 and premiered at the Harlem Film Festival. It was released on DVD on July 10, 2012.

Immortal Technique appeared as himself in a docudrama called This Revolution, which was recorded during the 2004 Republican National Convention in New York. The tape contains the protests surrounding the convention in the form of a documentary.

== Discography ==
=== Studio albums ===
Title	Album details	Peak chart positions		
Title	Album details	US	US R&B	US Rap
Revolutionary Vol. 1	Released: September 18, 2001; Label: Viper; Format: CD, LP, digital download	—	—	—
Revolutionary Vol. 2	Released: November 18, 2003; Label: Viper; Format: CD, LP, digital download	—	—	—
The 3rd World	Released: June 24, 2008; Label: Viper; Format: CD, LP, digital download	99	36	12

=== Compilation albums ===
Title	Album details
The Martyr	Released: October 27, 2011; Label: Viper, Fontana; Format: CD, LP, digital download

=== Singles ===
Title	Year	Album
"Industrial Revolution"	2003	Revolutionary Vol. 2
"The Point of No Return"	2004	Revolutionary Vol. 2
"Bin Laden" (with Mos Def and DJ Green Lantern)	2005	Non-album singles
"Bin Laden (Remix)" (with Chuck D and KRS-One)	2005	Non-album singles
"Caught in a Hustle"	2005	BAADASSSSS! Soundtrack
"Stronghold Warriors" (with Poison Pen)	2007	Pick Your Poison (The Mark of the East)
"The 3rd World"	2008	The 3rd World
"Voices of the Voiceless" (with Lowkey)	2009	Soundtrack to the Struggle
"Political Prisoner (Remix)"	2020	Non-album single
"Civil War" (with Brother Ali, Killer Mike and Chuck D)	2022	Non-album single
