= August 1969 =

Month of 1969

<<	August 1969					>>
Su	Mo	Tu	We	Th	Fr	Sa
					1	2
3	4	5	6	7	8	9
10	11	12	13	14	15	16
17	18	19	20	21	22	23
24	25	26	27	28	29	30
31

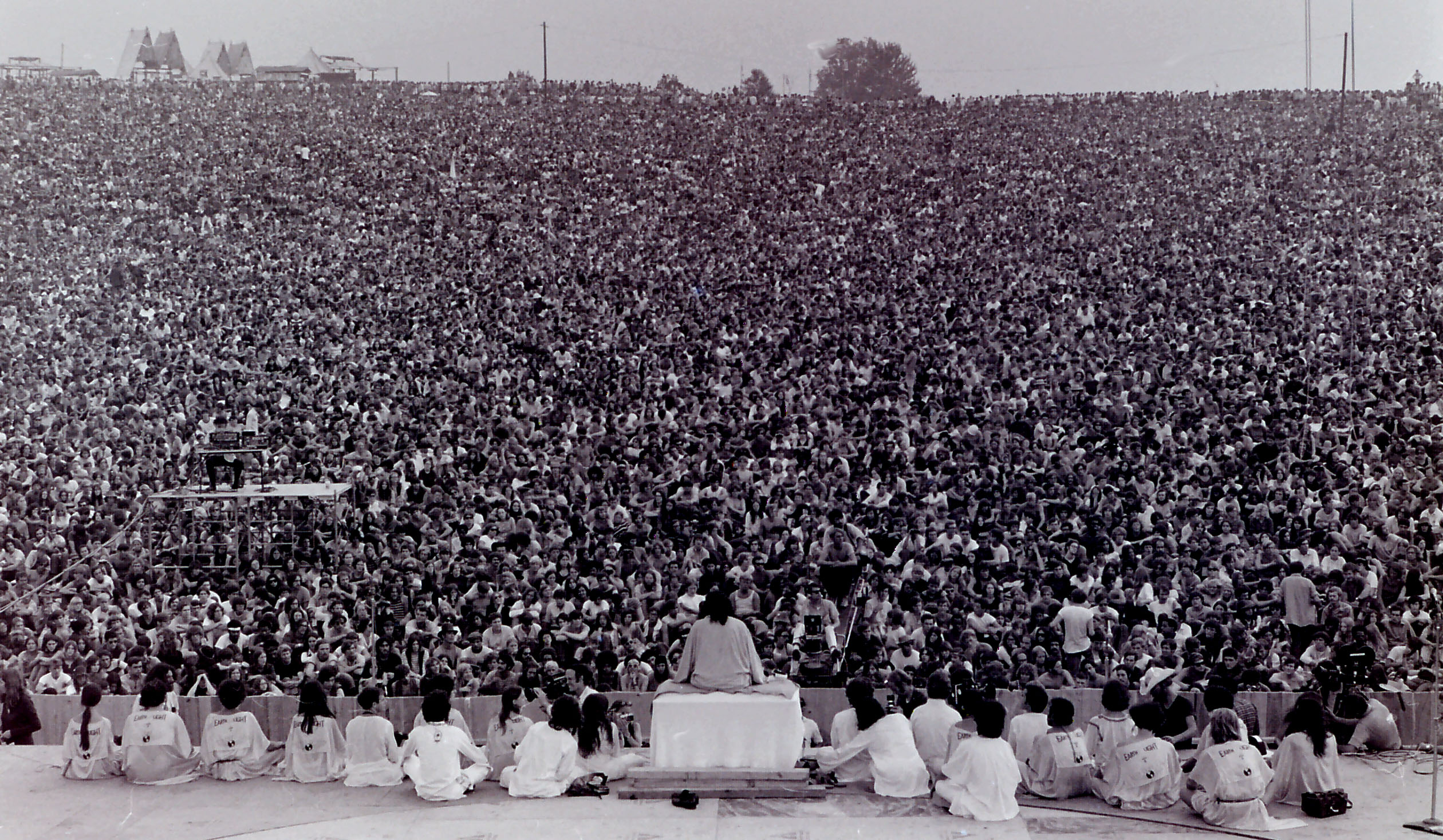
August 15–17, 1969: Hundreds of thousands attend the Woodstock festival

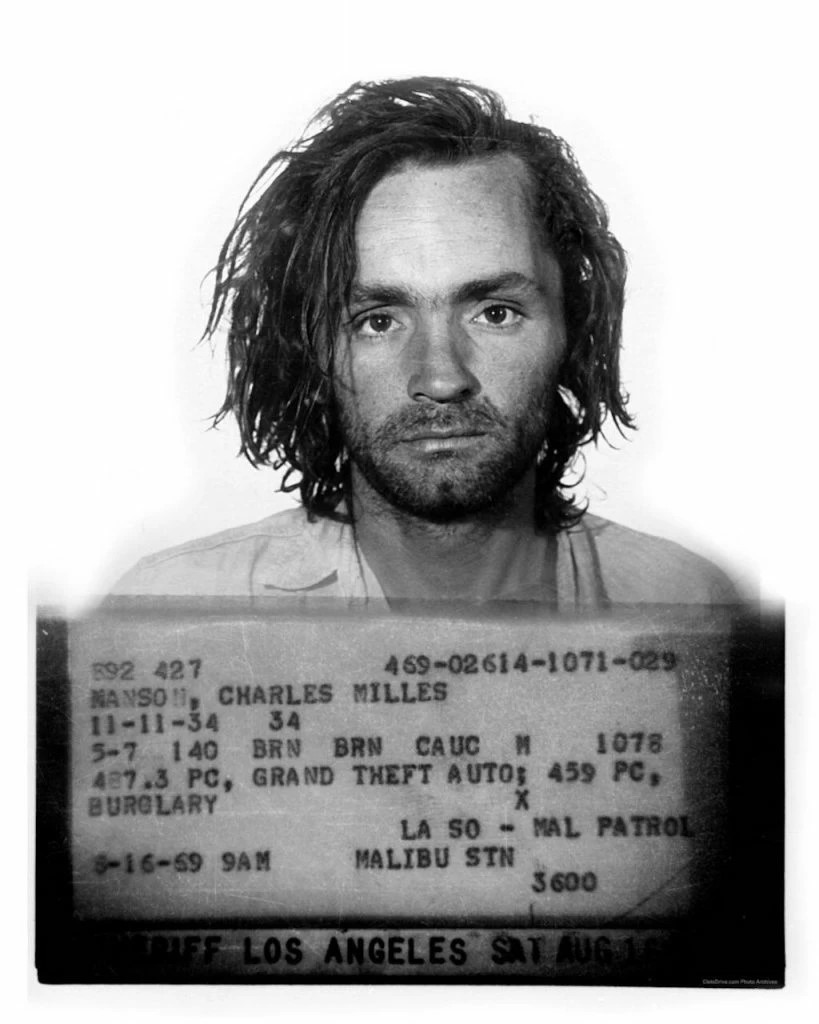
August 9–10, 1969: Charles Manson orders "Family" to carry out murders

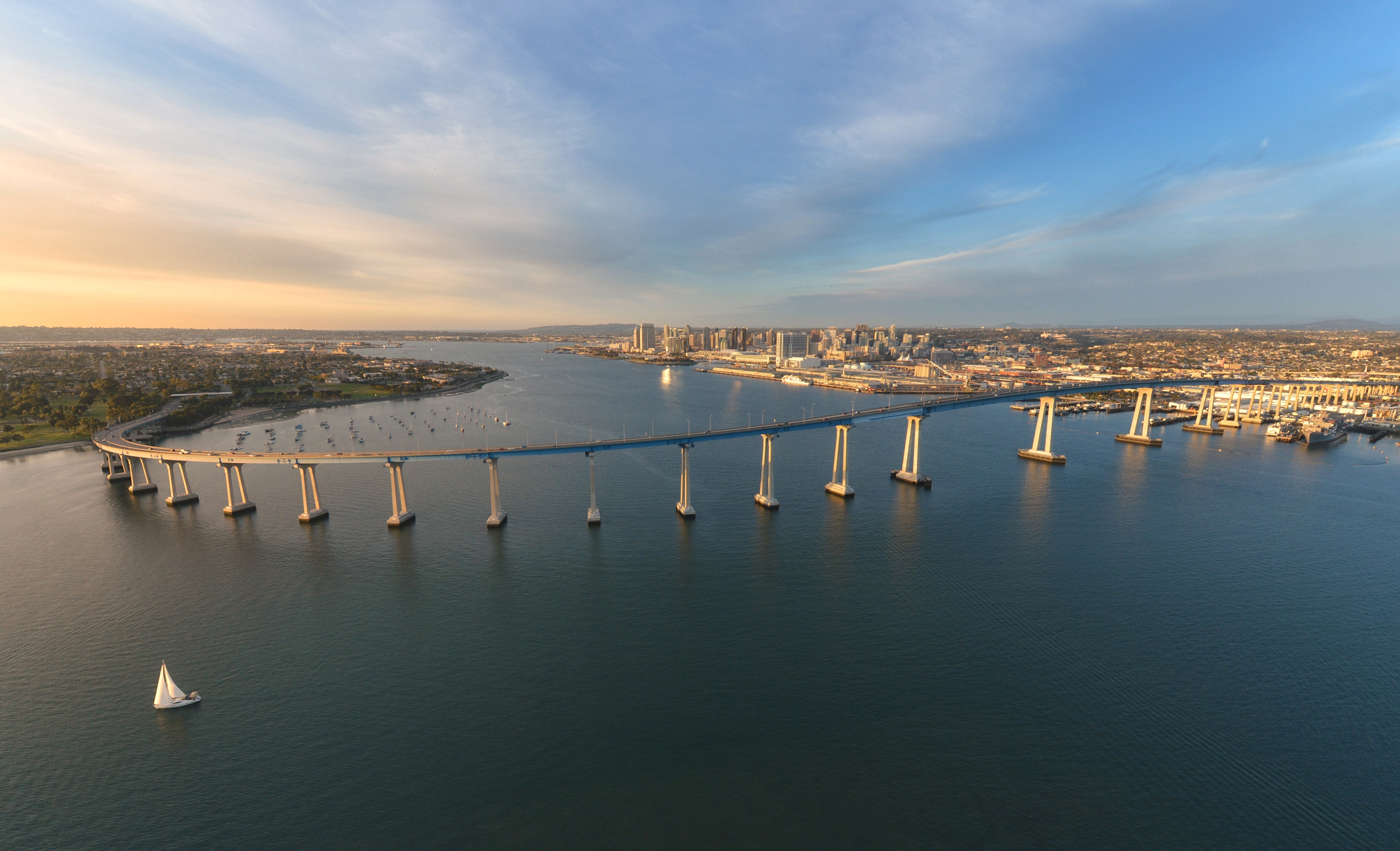
August 3, 1969: San Diego–Coronado Bridge opened

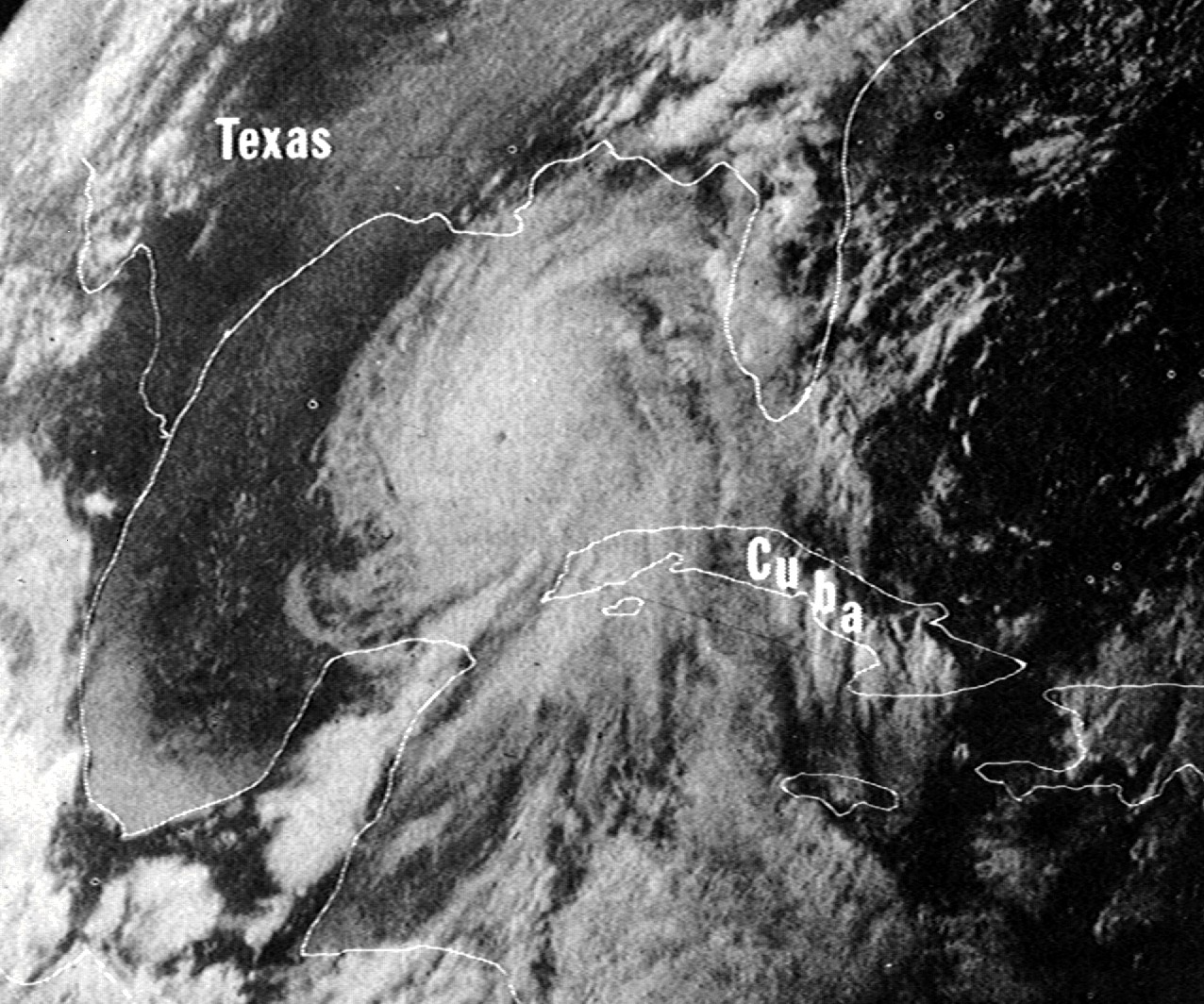
August 17–19, 1969: Hurricane Camille kills 259

The following events occurred in August 1969:

== August 1, 1969 (Friday) ==
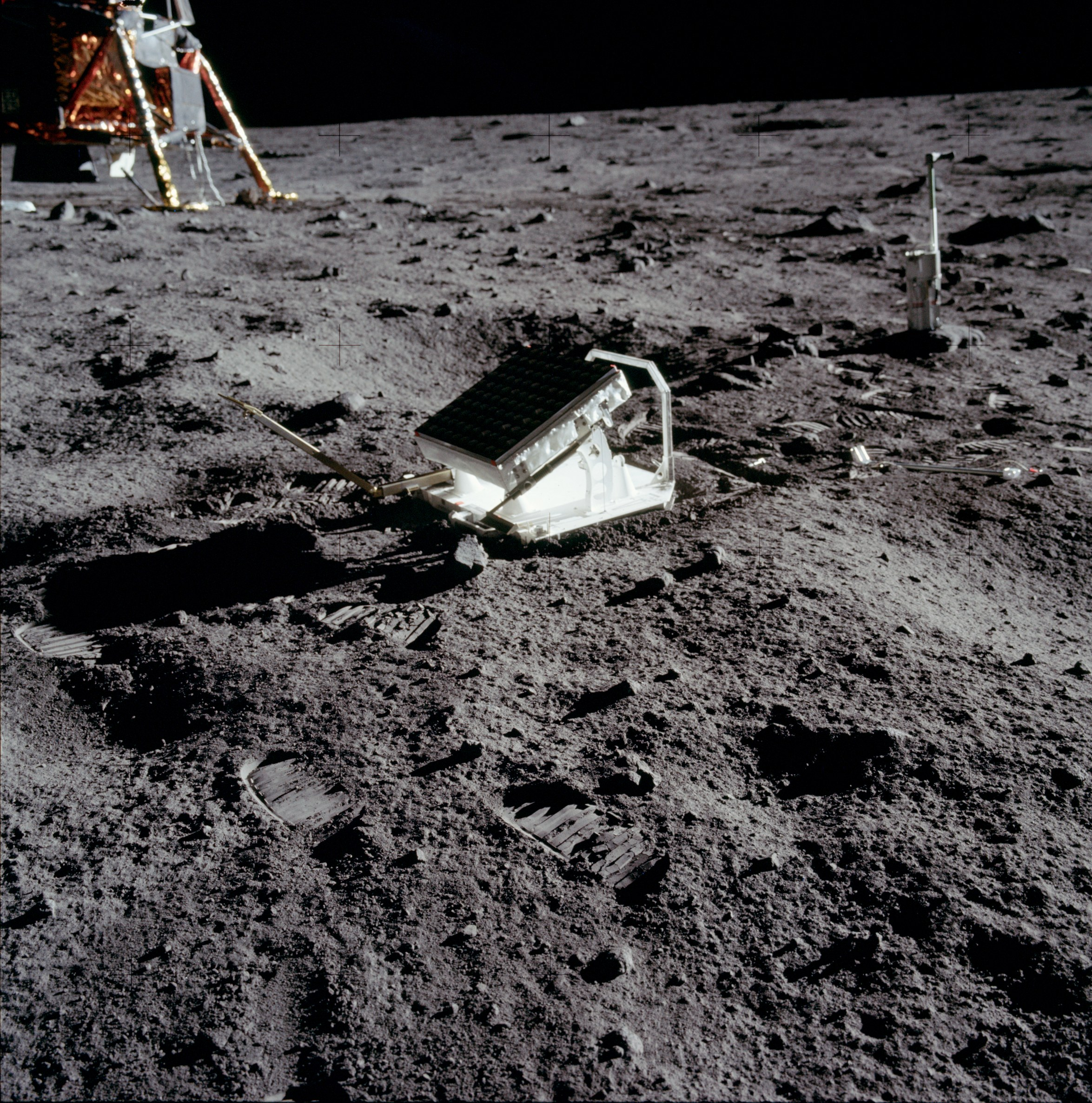
The Apollo 11 retroreflector, 226,970.9 miles away

- A retroreflector, deployed by Neil Armstrong on the Moon at the Apollo 11 landing site on July 21, was tested successfully for the first time as part of the ongoing Lunar Laser Ranging experiment. Astronomers at the Lick Observatory in San Jose, California, had been trying for 12 days to strike the 18 in (460 mm) diameter unit, deployed as part of the mission in order to make precise measurements of the distance between the Earth and the Moon, before finally striking it with the laser and receiving the reflected beam at 2:00 in the morning local time. The first laser measurement concluded that, at the time sent, the Moon was "226,970.9 miles, give or take 150 feet" from San Jose.

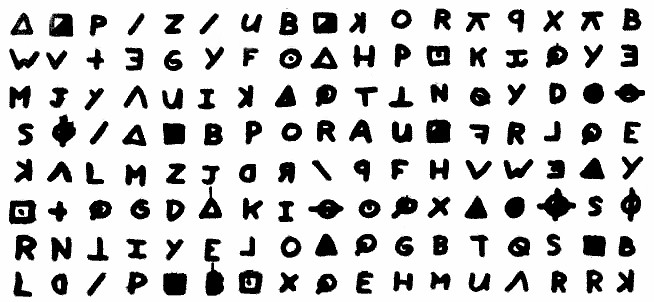
Vallejo's part of the cryptogram

- The Vallejo Times Herald and two San Francisco newspapers (the Chronicle and the Examiner) received letters from a man who would claim responsibility for the murder of 22-year-old Darlene Ferrin on July 4, and the December 20 murder of two high school students in Benicia. The letters, from a man who would later become known as the "Zodiac Killer", contained three parts of a cryptogram (a separate part for each newspaper) and a demand that the news dailies publish the letters to prevent more murders. To date, the Zodiac Killer has never been identified.
- NASA Administrator Thomas O. Paine told a crowd that a crewed mission to both Mars and Venus would be feasible in the 1980s. Paine told a San Francisco audience that November 12, 1981, would be "a particularly good date" for the launch of two rockets (and a total of 12 astronauts) powered by the Nuclear Engine for Rocket Vehicle Application (NERVA) under development. With Mars, Earth and Venus in ideal positions relative to each other, Paine said, the astronauts could enter orbit around Mars by August 9, 1982, then send "reusable stages much like jet planes" to ferry astronauts back and forth to the surface, before departing on October 28, 1982, toward Venus and then using the Venusian orbital motion for a gravity assist or slingshot on August 14, 1983, to return to Earth. The possibility, however, would depend on whether the American public was willing to commit to a cost of $24 billion. On September 15, Paine and U.S. Vice President Spiro Agnew, both advocates for a human landing on Mars, would present their task force report to U.S. President Richard Nixon, who accepted their recommendations "subject to budgetary considerations".
- After a hunt for a suspect who had killed five female students in the area since March in what had been dubbed as the "Co-ed murders", police arrested Eastern Michigan University student John Norman Collins in Ypsilanti, Michigan, and charged him with the July 23 murder of EMU freshman Karen Beineman.
- Died: Donald Keith, 65, American silent film actor and co-star with Clara Bow

== August 2, 1969 (Saturday) ==
- Richard Nixon became the first incumbent U.S. president to visit the capital of a Communist nation, arriving in Bucharest, Romania, as the guest of Romanian President Nicolae Ceaușescu.
- Born:
  - Hellhammer (stage name for Jan Axel Bloomberg), Norwegian heavy metal drummer of the black metal band Mayhem; in Trysil Municipality
  - Fernando Couto, Portuguese footballer with 110 matches for the national team; in Espinho

== August 3, 1969 (Sunday) ==
- All 55 people on board Aeroflot Flight H-826 were killed when a propeller blade came loose from the Antonov 24B 11 minutes after it had taken off from Dnepropetrovsk on a flight to another city in the Ukrainian SSR. When the plane reached an altitude of 4,000 metres (13,000 ft), part of the blade on the left side engine punctured the fuselage and severed the elevator and the aileron controls that allowed the plane to descend and to bank, respectively. The plane descended then spun before crashing into the ground.
- The 2.1 mi (3.4 km) long Coronado Bridge over San Diego Bay, high enough 244 ft (74 m) to allow U.S. Navy ships to travel beneath it, was opened to traffic at one minute after midnight. The toll bridge (which cost 60 cents to cross) had been dedicated the day before by California Governor Ronald Reagan, and pedestrians were allowed to walk its length between San Diego and Coronado, California, until midnight.

== August 4, 1969 (Monday) ==
- In Paris, U.S. National Security Adviser Henry Kissinger secretly met with North Vietnam's former Foreign Minister, Xuan Thuy, to discuss a means of settling the Vietnam War at the Paris Peace Talks. The meeting followed a personal letter sent on July 16 by U.S. President Richard Nixon, to North Vietnam's President Ho Chi Minh, by way of France's diplomatic representative in Hanoi, Jean Sainteny. A Vietnamese historian would later note that "The secret dialogue was eventually to become more significant that the formal talks at Avenue Kleber," site of the Paris negotiations.

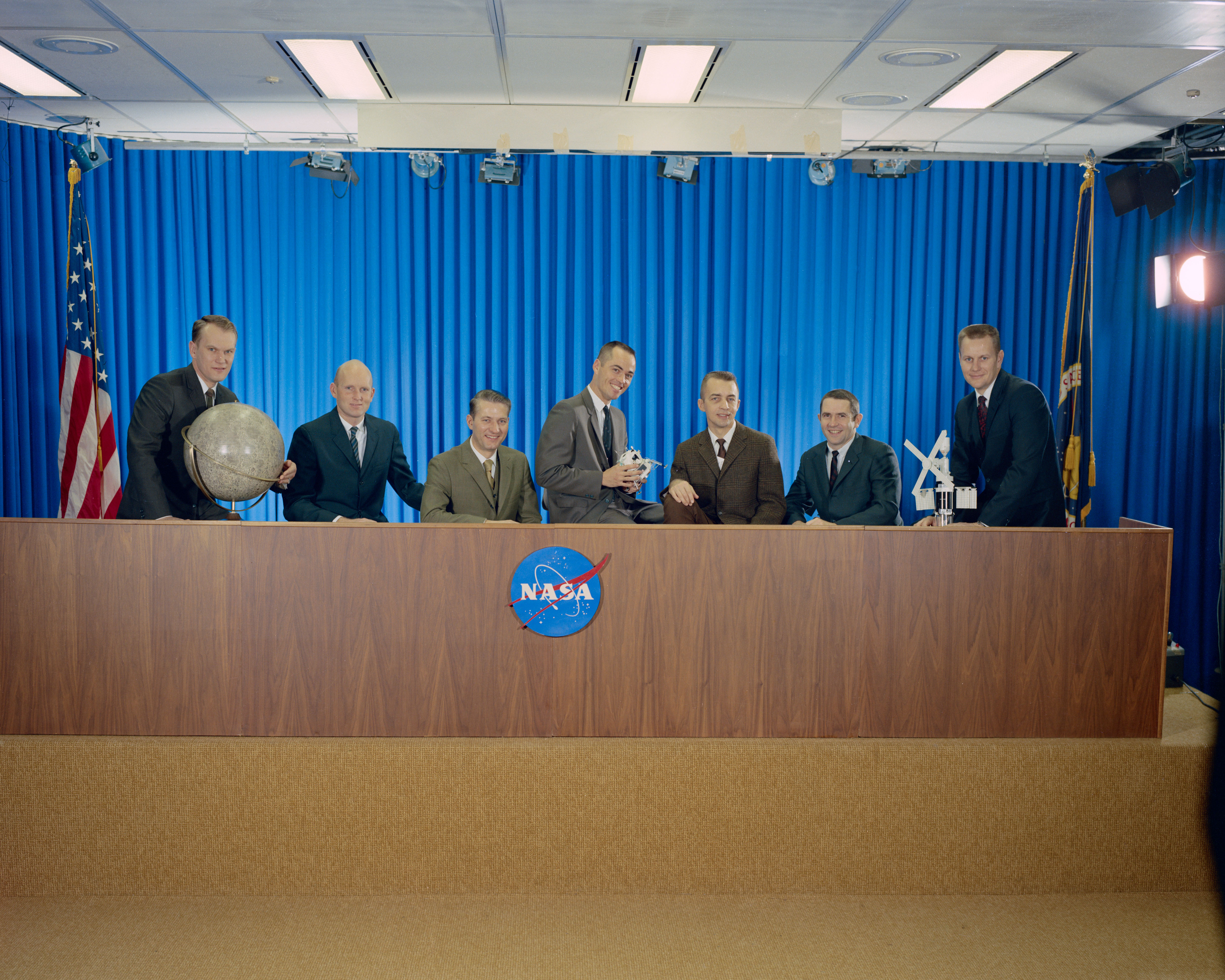
NASA Astronaut Group 7

- NASA's George E. Mueller, in charge of Manned Space Flight, chose seven astronauts to augment existing flight crews for the Manned Orbiting Laboratory (MOL). Those picked were Karol J. Bobko, Charles G. Fullerton, Henry W. Hartsfield, and Donald H. Peterson of the U.S. Air Force); Richard H. Truly and Robert L. Crippen of the U.S. Navy; and Robert F. Overmyer of the U.S. Marine Corps. The seven were picked for their extensive training and experience with the MOL project and in view of the future of human spaceflight. NASA announced NASA Astronaut Group 7 on August 14. Another former MOL program astronaut, Albert H. Crews (USAF), had been a pilot in the canceled X-20 Dyna-Soar program, and joined MSC's Flight Crew Operations Directorate.
- Born: Michael DeLuise, American TV and film actor; in Los Angeles

== August 5, 1969 (Tuesday) ==
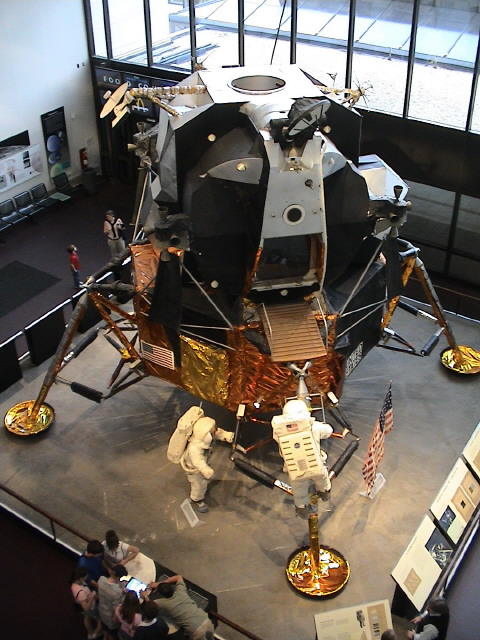
LM-2 at the Smithsonian in 2004

- At least one future lunar landing canceled, NASA directed its Manned Space Center to prepare the transfer of the only Lunar Module (LM) no longer scheduled to be used, designated "LM-2" and slated for donation to the Smithsonian Institution. It was expected that the Smithsonian would exhibit LM-2 as a replica of the Lunar Module Eagle, designated LM-5, which had been first to land on the Moon during the Apollo 11 mission. After returning Neil Armstrong and Buzz Aldrin to the orbiting Command Module, Eagle had been jettisoned and had crashed somewhere on the Moon's surface. NASA asked MSC to refurbish LM-2 to more closely resemble the Eagle's configuration prior to transfer. The LM-2 ascent stage would spend several months at Expo 70 in Osaka, Japan, before going to the Smithsonian. Due to later cancellation of lunar missions Apollo 18 and Apollo 19, modules LM-9 and LM-13 would not be used for and remain on Earth.

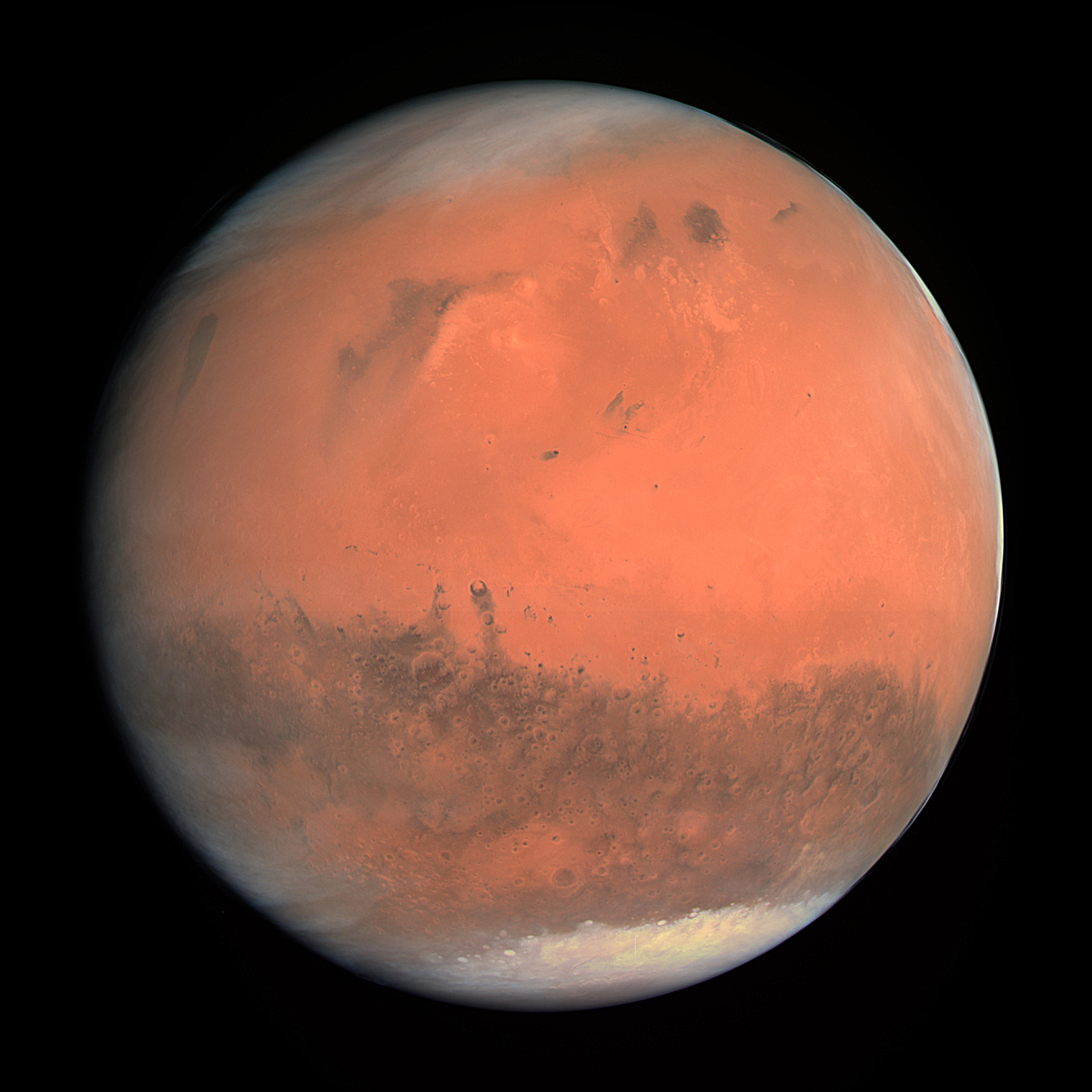
Image of Mars, taken by Mariner 7

- Mariner 7 transmitted the closest pictures taken, up to that time, of the planet Mars, after the American interplanetary probe came within 2,000 miles (3,200 km) of the Martian surface. The 31 images were received at the Jet Propulsion Laboratory in Pasadena, California, a little more than five minutes after having been sent from a distance of more than 58 million miles (93 million kilometers).
- The Stooges, a U.S. rock band, released their self-titled debut album, a landmark on the proto-punk scene.
- Born: Kenny Irwin Jr., American stock car racing driver; in Indianapolis (killed in racing accident, 2000)
- Died: Duke Adolf Friedrich of Mecklenburg, 95, German scientist and explorer who was colonial Governor of Togoland prior to World War I, and later the president of West Germany's Olympic committee. The Ituri chameleon species (Kinyongia adolfifriderici), bears his name, as does a genus of four species of lizards, including Adolfus alleni.

== August 6, 1969 (Wednesday) ==
- A sonic boom from a U.S. Navy F-4J Phantom II jet aircraft shattered three-quarters of the windows in the downtown business district of the Canadian resort town of Kelowna, British Columbia, causing an estimated $150,000 worth of damage and injuring six people hurt by broken glass. The unusual incident happened when a member of the Navy's Blue Angels stunt flying team exceeded Mach 1 at an altitude of only 300 feet (91 m). The pilot was accelerating to catch up with the other three members of his team during practice for an upcoming air show. The cost of repairs, initially estimated at $250,000, was revised downward after 300 different claims were filed, and the U.S. Navy agreed to pay the costs on August 28.
- Born:
  - Elliott Smith, American singer and songwriter (d. 2003); in Omaha, Nebraska
  - Jonathan Aibel, American film screenwriter; in Demarest, New Jersey
- Died: Theodor W. Adorno, 65, German theoretical philosopher

== August 7, 1969 (Thursday) ==
- All but 10 of the residents of the small town of Greenfield, Iowa (population 2,243) pledged to give up (or never to start) smoking cigarettes, as well as cigars and pipes, in advance of the shooting of a film produced and directed by Norman Lear. A total of 2,464 cards pledging to quit smoking or not to start were signed after lobbying by local leaders with the assistance of the Girl Scouts. Starring Dick Van Dyke and Bob Newhart, the movie Cold Turkey (about the fictitious town of "Eagle Rock, Iowa" quitting tobacco "cold turkey"), would not be released until 1971.
- A panel of three judges, appointed by federal court order, concluded that de facto racial segregation still existed in 8 city school and 15 county school districts in Alabama. The largest of the districts cited were in Tuscaloosa County and in the city of Dothan. In all cases, the systems continued to operate separate white and Negro schools, and in some cases, practiced "busing of negro students to all-Negro schools when a predominantly white school is nearer to their homes." The systems were directed to desegregate by the 1970–71 school year.
- NASA officials announced at the Ames Research Center in Houston that testing of the lunar soil, brought back by the Apollo 11 mission, showed no organisms and no "positive traces of life". Scientists conceded that some of the Moon rocks had "a trace of organic material" (10 parts per million) but that it was likely caused by Earth contamination from rubber gloves, tools and plastic bags that stored the samples. Testing included injection of Moon dust into laboratory mice, spectrometer analysis and burning the samples for signs of carbon.
- U.S. President Richard Nixon and West Germany's Chancellor Kurt Georg Kiesinger agreed to establish a "hot line" for instant communication between the two allies.

== August 8, 1969 (Friday) ==
- U.S. President Richard Nixon, a Republican, proposed a law providing a basic guaranteed minimum income to poor families, regardless of whether any member of the family was able to obtain employment. Work incentives were part of the proposal, including free day-care centers for children, a 25% bonus for people in job-training programs, and allowing people to earn additional money at work without jeopardizing their guaranteed income. Nixon said that his program, which would replace the existing welfare payment system, "aims at ending the unfairness in a system that has become unfair to the welfare recipient, unfair to the working poor, and unfair to the taxpayer." Analysts noted that Nixon's proposal would more than double the number of people receiving government assistance to 22.4 million and would almost double the amount of money budgeted for welfare programs. The amount of guaranteed income— $1,600 per year or $133.33 per month— would be the equivalent of about $900 per month in 2018.
- The government of France announced a 12.5% devaluation of its currency, the French franc, effective Monday, with the exchange rate for one U.S. dollar going from 4.94F to 5.55F. Conversely, the value of the franc dropped from 20 cents to 18 cents American. Only eight people, including President Georges Pompidou and Finance Minister Valery Giscard D'Estaing, were aware of the July 16 decision; the French government followed up the announcement with a seven-week price freeze to prohibit wholesale and retail prices from being raised until September 15.
- The Beatles had their iconic photograph taken of their crossing of London's Abbey Road, as the cover for their record album of the same name, with professional photographer Iain Macmillan handling the photo shoot of six images, while London police blocked traffic. The zebra crossing (black and white striped crosswalk), which attracts tourists wanting to re-enact the cover photo, was near the Beatles' Abbey Road Studios and allows pedestrians to cross Abbey Road near its intersection with Grove End Road.
- At 5:48 in the morning local time (23:48 UTC on August 7 and 2:48 in Moscow on August 8), the Soviet Union launched the uncrewed Zond 7 mission from the Baikonur Cosmodrome on the first and only successful mission to employ the Soyuz 7K-L1 spacecraft that would have potentially had enough power to send cosmonauts on a crewed voyage to the Moon.
- Four members of the Manson Family— Tex Watson, Susan Atkins, Patricia Krenwinkel, and Linda Kasabian— departed from their home at the Spahn Ranch in Los Angeles to drive to a home near Beverly Hills with orders from their leader, Charles Manson, to kill everyone inside the house. They arrived shortly after midnight.
- Born: Faye Wong, Chinese pop singer; as Wang Fei in Beijing
- Died: Choi Seung-hee, 57, North Korean actress and dancer posthumously proclaimed as a "People's Actress"

== August 9, 1969 (Saturday) ==
- On orders from Charles Manson, members of the Manson Family invaded the Los Angeles home of film director Roman Polanski and his wife, actress Sharon Tate a little after midnight on August 9. Though Polanski was in Europe filming a movie, his 8 1/2-month-pregnant wife, Sharon, was at home. Tate and her three friends, celebrity hair stylist Jay Sebring, heiress Abigail Folger and her boyfriend Wojciech "Voyteck" Frykowski were all getting ready for bed when the killers entered the home via an opened window. The group then brutally murdered Tate, her unborn child, her three guests, and an 18-year-old Steven Parent, who had the misfortune of driving away from 10050 Cielo Drive after visiting the property’s caretaker just as the killers trespassed onto the grounds. After the murders, one of the killers wrote the word “PIG” on the front door in Sharon Tate’s blood. The killers hoped the murders would shock the American public and start a race war the family called “Helter Skelter” after The Beatles song of the same name.
- The Haunted Mansion, the first addition to the Disneyland resort in Anaheim, California, since the death of Walt Disney, opened to a limited number of guests, before the official opening on August 12.
- U.S. President Nixon flew to San Clemente, California, to conduct the affairs of state for a month from the new residence that he referred to as the "Western White House".
- Died: C. F. Powell, 65, British physicist and 1950 Nobel Prize laureate for his discovery of photographic documentation of subatomic particles

== August 10, 1969 (Sunday) ==
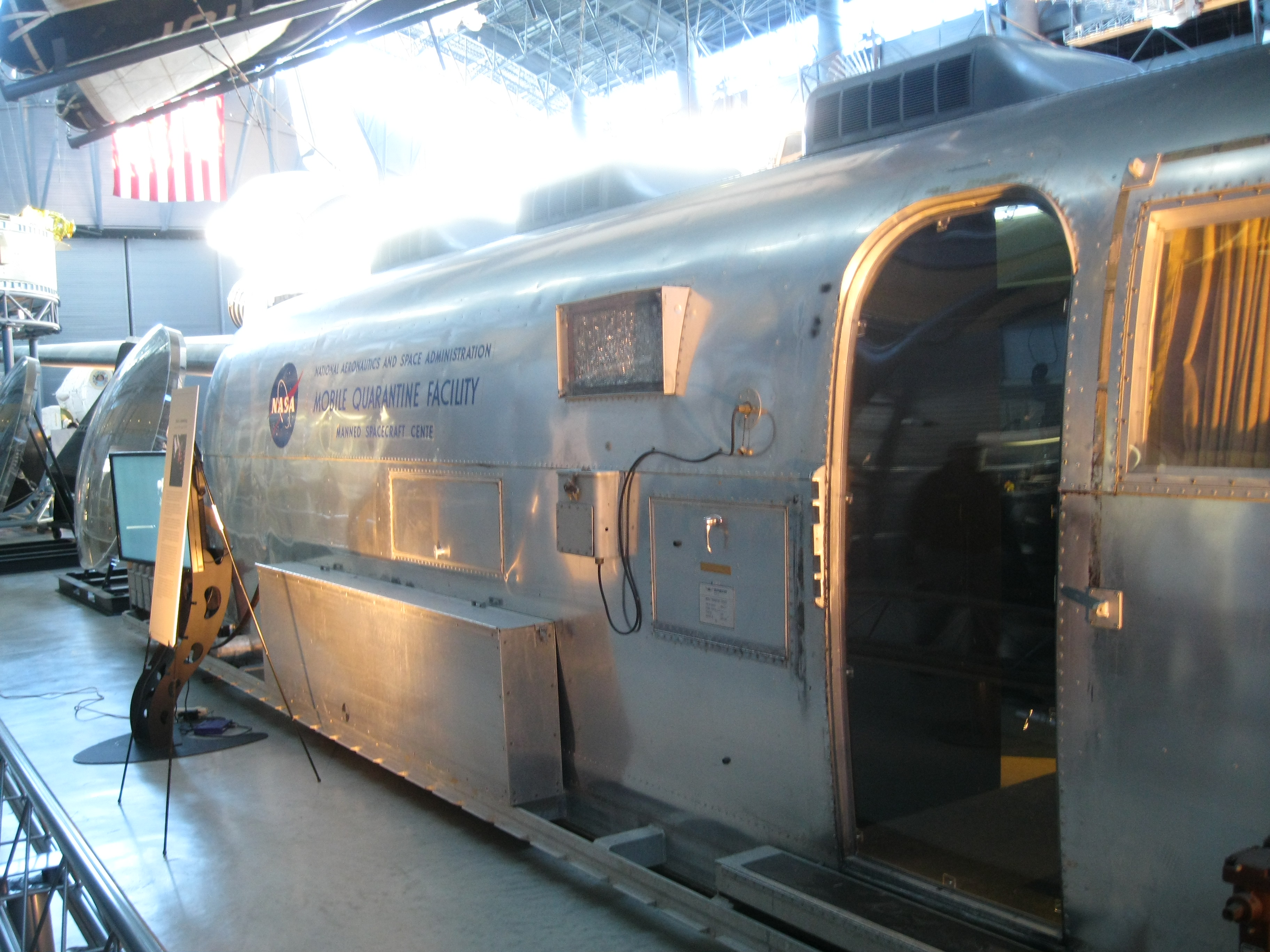
The quarantine facility

- The three Apollo 11 astronauts were allowed to leave the "mobile quarantine facility" where they and two scientists had lived for three weeks while being examined for possible contamination from the lunar soil that they had brought back from the Moon. In all, 23 people who had been the first to handle the "Moon rocks", had been isolated until NASA administrators verified that there was no biological threat from the material. Neil Armstrong, Buzz Aldrin and Michael Collins then rejoined their families in Houston for the first time since June 25.
- Los Angeles grocery store owner Leno LaBianca and his wife, Rosemary, were murdered in their home less than 24 hours after the killing of five people at the home of Sharon Tate, on orders of Charles Manson, who had picked the LaBianca home at random.

== August 11, 1969 (Monday) ==
- The United States Senate voted unanimously, 91 to 0, to restrict further production, development and testing by the United States military of chemical weapons and biological weapons. The rules, passed as part of nine amendments to a $20 billion defense appropriations bill, required that in the future, the U.S. Department of Defense would report twice a year to Congress about projects, prohibited spending future money on delivery systems for stockpiles of lethal chemicals or germs, required advance notice by the Department of any plans for weapons use outside the U.S. (to both Congress and to the governments of the nations affected), halted outdoor testing of weapons, and required detoxification of lethal agents before they were to be transported for disposal.
- Israel conducted its first air attack, ever, on Lebanon, as Israeli Air Force jets flew across the Israeli-Lebanese border of the Golan Heights at 1:30 in the afternoon and began a 30-minute raid on suspected guerrilla positions in the Jabal al-Shaykh mountain cluster. The area is referred to as Mount Hermon in the 1st Book of Chronicles in the Bible.
- Born: Ashley Jensen, Scottish TV actress; in Annan, Dumfriesshire

== August 12, 1969 (Tuesday) ==
- By a vote of 4 to 1, the U.S. Federal Trade Commission (FTC) voted to issue the first regulations to control "giveaway" games of chance that had been used in promotions by supermarket and gasoline station chains since 1964, "with the lone dissenter objecting on grounds that promotional gimmicks are inherently unfair and should be outlawed entirely". Tickets were given to customers when they purchased food or gasoline, as an incentive to choose one retailer over a competitor, but the FTC had found in a study that the promoters had been using deceptive practices, that included giving away all the game pieces for big prizes (in one case, in the first four weeks of a 13-week promotion) and letting the ticket sellers know how to tell which game pieces were winners; the study concluded that "a customer's chances of winning a cash prize per store visit were about three out a thousand."
- The "Battle of the Bogside" began in Derry, Northern Ireland, in what a Reuters dispatch described as "the predominantly Catholic slum area" in the city. The outbreak of violence, which injured 140 people in its first evening, when 5,000 marchers from the Protestant Apprentice Boys of Derry staged their annual parade to commemorate the 1689 victory of Protestant defenders over Catholic attackers in the Siege of Derry. After peacefully marching through the Protestant sections of Derry, the marchers defiantly continued into the Bogside and had stones thrown at them by 300 counter-protesters. On the third day of violence, British Army troops moved in to quell the violence and began a nearly 40-year-long presence in Derry.
- Abdelmunim Al-Rifai resigned as Prime Minister of Jordan and was replaced by the man whom he replaced less than five months earlier, Bahjat Talhouni.

== August 13, 1969 (Wednesday) ==
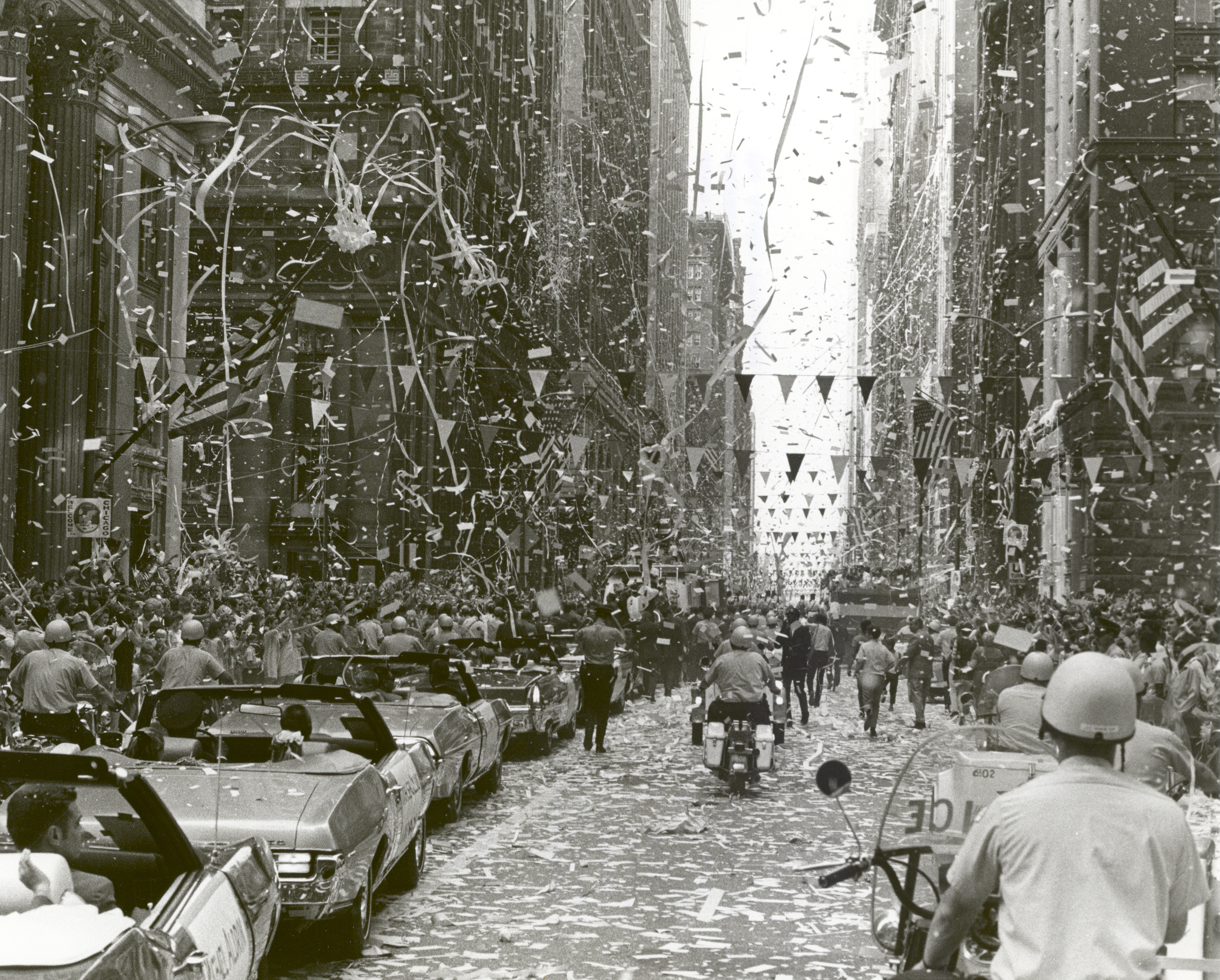
August 13, 1969: Chicago ticker-tape parade for the crew of Apollo 11

- The three Apollo 11 astronauts rode in ticker-tape parades in their honor in New York and Chicago, with an estimated six million attendees. On the same evening in Los Angeles there was an official state dinner to celebrate the flight, attended by members of Congress, 44 governors, Chief Justice of the United States Warren E. Burger and his predecessor, Earl Warren, and ambassadors from 83 nations at the Century Plaza Hotel.
- China and the Soviet Union accused each other of making armed invasions of their territory. According to the Chinese, the Soviets "sent two helicopters, dozens of tanks and armored vehicles and several hundred armed troops" in an invasion of the Xinjiang Autonomous Region in Yumin, and killed numerous frontier guards. The Soviets said in turn that Chinese troops had invaded the Kazakh SSR at a point 6 miles (9.7 km) east of Lake Zhalanashkol.
- NASA Headquarters revised Apollo Applications Program (AAP) delivery and launch schedules, further altering the program in light of changing resources and fiscal climate, as well as a maturing of program plans. The new schedule called for seven Saturn IB and two Saturn V launches, with flight of the first Workshop slated for July 1972.
- Born: Midori Ito, Japanese Olympic figure skater and 1989 world champion; in Nagoya
- Died: Nicolás Fasolino, 82, Argentine Roman Catholic Cardinal and Archbishop of Santa Fe since 1932

== August 14, 1969 (Thursday) ==
- British Army troops began what would become an almost 38-year presence in Northern Ireland, the companion to Great Britain in the United Kingdom, as more than 300 soldiers from the Prince of Wales Regiment arrived at Derry to end three days of rioting called the "Battle of the Bogside" and to maintain security there. "Operation Banner" would finally come to an end at midnight on July 31, 2007.
- Died: Leonard Woolf, 88, British political theorist and widower of Virginia Woolf

== August 15, 1969 (Friday) ==
- The Woodstock Festival began as an estimated 200,000 people arrived at the dairy farm of Max Yasgur in Sullivan County, New York, near the town of Bethel in the Catskill Mountains. The six-man rock music group Sweetwater had been scheduled as the opening act, but was stuck instead in a traffic jam on Route 17B and had to be airlifted by helicopter. A little-known guitarist, Richie Havens, then entertained the crowd for three hours as the opening act until Sweetwater could arrive. Complaints were made to local authorities by people living next to Yasgur's 600-acre (240 ha) farm, and heavy rainfall turned the fields into what a UPI reporter called "a sea of mud, sickness and drugs at the hippie-style Woodstock Music and Art Fair".
- Captain D's, an American fast food seafood restaurant, opened its first eatery, with Raymond L. Danner starting the business as "Mr. D's Seafood and Hamburgers" in Donelson, Tennessee, a suburb of Nashville near the Opryland USA theme park. Within its first fifty years, the chain had more than 500 franchises.
- Born:
  - Bernard Fanning, Australian musician and singer-songwriter, frontman of Powderfinger, in Brisbane
  - John Fetterman, American politician, Senator of Pennsylvania; in West Reading, Pennsylvania
  - Kevin Cheng, American-born Hong Kong singer and actor; in San Francisco

== August 16, 1969 (Saturday) ==
- A week after the Tate-LaBianca murders, Charles Manson and 25 other people were arrested by Los Angeles County sheriff's deputies at the Spahn Ranch, not on suspicion of the killings, but for auto theft. A report at the time noted that "The group— 11 men and 15 women including several members of a motorcycle gang called Satan's Slaves— was stealing Volkswagens, dismantling them and converting them into dune buggies, according to deputies." The "Manson Family" group was released ten days later because the arrest warrant had had the wrong date on it. When the members returned to the Spahn Ranch, they murdered Donald "Shorty" Shea, a former movie stuntman and the ranch hand whom they had blamed for calling the police.
- The Woodstock Festival moved into its second full day as Arlo Guthrie wrapped up his set of songs after midnight. Artists who performed and would later be inducted into the Rock and Roll Hall of Fame were Joan Baez (until 2:00 a.m.), Santana, John Sebastian, and the Grateful Dead.

== August 17, 1969 (Sunday) ==
- The Woodstock Festival began its final full day. Between midnight and 10:00 in the morning, the hundreds of thousands of people watched six consecutive acts that would later be inducted into the Hall of Fame, as the Grateful Dead was followed by Creedence Clearwater Revival, Janis Joplin, Sly and the Family Stone, The Who, and Jefferson Airplane. The Canadian group The Band played at 10:00 that night.
- Hurricane Camille made landfall from the Gulf of Mexico onto the Mississippi coast as Biloxi and other coastal cities were evacuated. A large number of people, however, chose to "ride out the storm" and even held parties over the weekend to celebrate the excitement. In all, 259 people would be killed as a direct result of the hurricane and the flooding produced by the storms in its wake.
- Born:
  - Dick Togo (stage name for Shigeki Sato), Japanese professional wrestler; in Ōdate, Akita
  - Donnie Wahlberg, American singer, TV actor and film actor; in Boston
- Died:
  - Otto Stern, 81, German-born American physicist and 1943 Nobel Prize laureate known for postulating the Stern–Volmer relationship and the Stern–Gerlach experiment.
  - Philip Blaiberg, 60, South African dentist and the first transplant patient to survive more than a year after receiving a donor heart.
  - Ludwig Mies van der Rohe, 83, German-born American modernist architect

== August 18, 1969 (Monday) ==
- Long John Silver's, an American fast-food restaurant chain specializing in seafood, opened its first store, making its debut in Lexington, Kentucky. The chain would have more than 1,000 franchises within its first fifty years.
- President Nixon nominated South Carolina federal judge Clement F. Haynsworth, Jr. to the United States Supreme Court to fill the vacancy created by the resignation in May of Abe Fortas.
- Seven people were killed and 15 injured in the collapse of the Hotel Galicia in the Spanish town of Fraga, after a truck crashed into the lobby and brought half of the structure down.
- A two-hour concert by Jimi Hendrix and his band concluded the Woodstock Festival.
- Born:
  - Masta Killa (stage name for Jamel Irief), American rapper and member of the Wu-Tang Clan; in New York City
  - Christian Slater, American film and television actor; in Brooklyn
  - Timothy D. Snyder, American historian; in Dayton
  - Edward Norton, American film actor; in Boston
- Died: Mildred Davis, 68, American silent film actress and co-star with her husband, comedian Harold Lloyd

== August 19, 1969 (Tuesday) ==
- Hurricane Camille caused its highest loss of life far inland from sea, killing 124 people in Nelson County, Virginia, near the center of that U.S. state. During the night, more than 30 inches (760 mm) of rain fell in a few hours, causing flash floods and mudslides. The hurricane winds had slowed down, but the storm system slowed down over Nelson County and caused the James River and its tributaries to quickly overflow their banks in what remains "the worst natural disaster to ever strike Virginia".
- Born:
  - Matthew Perry, American TV actor and comedian best known for portraying Chandler Bing on Friends (d. 2023); in Williamstown, Massachusetts
  - Nate Dogg (stage name for Nathaniel Dwayne Hale), American rap artist (d. 2011); in Clarksdale, Mississippi
  - Clay Walker (Ernest Clayton Walker, Jr.), American country music singer; in Vidor, Texas
  - Doug Langdale, American film screenwriter; in North Hollywood, California

== August 20, 1969 (Wednesday) ==
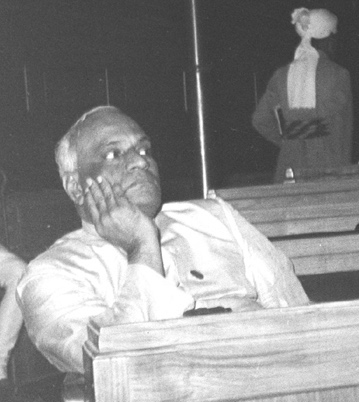
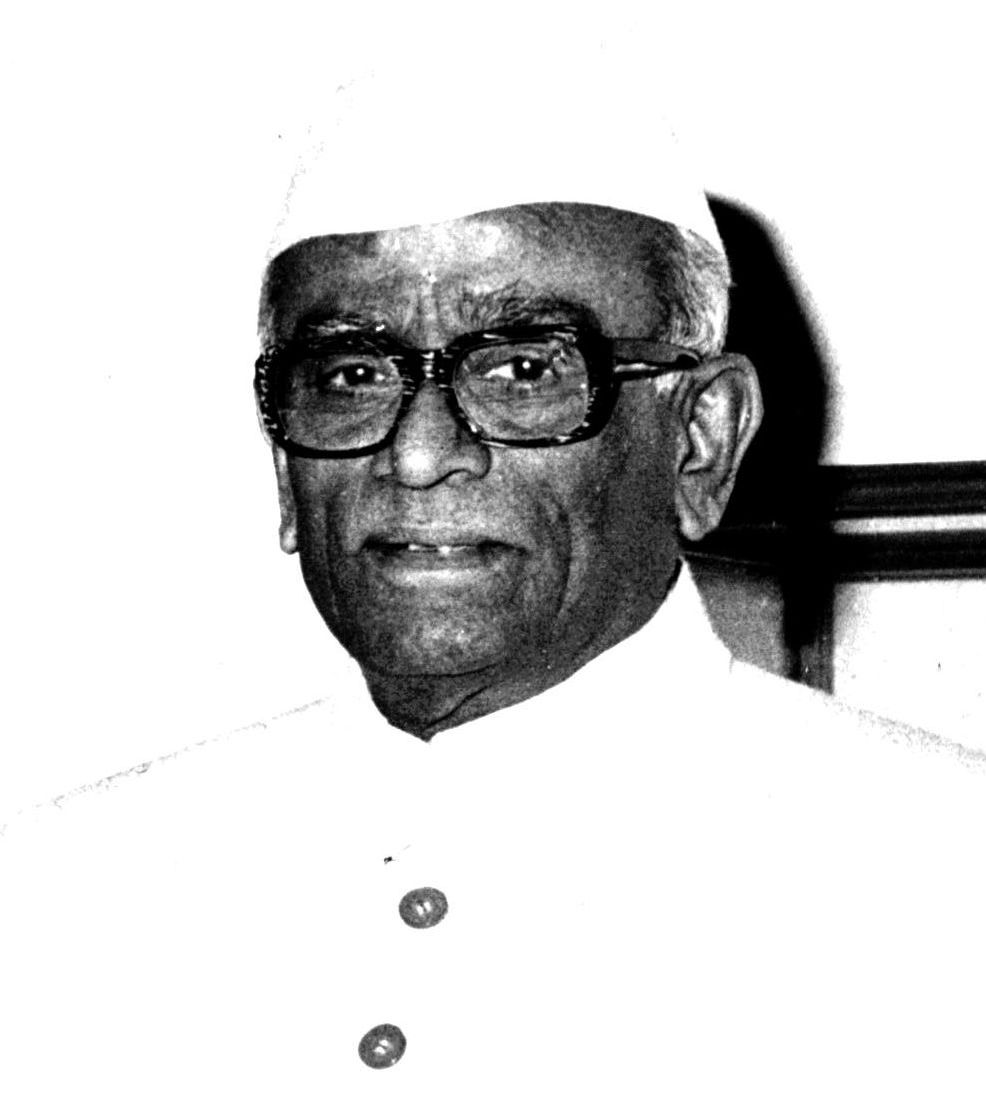
Candidates V. V. Giri and N. S. Reddy
- V. V. Giri was elected as the new President of India, in what one reporter described as "the most important presidential election in the history of India, where the presidency is largely a ceremonial office," defeating Neelam Sanjiva Reddy in a runoff election. Giri, the former Vice President, had temporarily served as Acting President for almost three months after the May 3 death of President Zakir Husain, until stepping aside in order to run in the election. Voting for the presidency was done by the members of India's electoral college, composed of the nation's national, state and provincial legislators whose individual ballots were worth a specified number of votes. The decision of a member of India's parliament chambers, the Lok Sabha and the Rajya Sabha, was worth 576 votes, while members of the subnational legislators could cast ballots worth between 8 and 174 votes. Of the 825,504 votes, Giri defeated Reddy by a margin of 420,077 to 405,427. Reddy would later be elected president in 1977.
- The Beatles assembled at Abbey Road Studios to complete the last necessary production for their album Abbey Road. John Lennon, Paul McCartney, George Harrison and Ringo Starr finished the overdubs for "I Want You" (subtitled "She's So Heavy"). Two days later, they met at Lennon's estate for a final photo session. On January 3, McCartney, Harrison and Starr would gather in a studio, without Lennon, to finish "I Me Mine" for the Let It Be album, which had largely been completed before Abbey Road.
- Died:
  - Marty Barry, 63, Canadian NHL forward and Hockey Hall of Fame inductee
  - Dudley D. Watkins, 62, English cartoonist

== August 21, 1969 (Thursday) ==
- An Australian tourist, Denis Michael Rohan, set fire to the Al-Aqsa Mosque in Jerusalem. Despite the Israeli government's actions to extinguish the fire and to try and convict Michael Rohan for the crime, "Israel was widely accused in the Arab world of arson" and the incident would lead to an annual meeting of the foreign ministers of the Islamic nations, starting with the Islamic Summit Conference. Rohan confessed to investigators later that he had entered the mosque, the most sacred Islamic shrine in Jerusalem, with two cans of gasoline and then set the fire. Rohan was determined by an Israeli court to be insane, and hospitalized for most of the remainder of his life for psychiatric treatment.
- The Gap, a clothing store chain which would have almost 4,000 outlets within its first fifty years, began business as real estate developer Donald Fisher and his wife Doris F. Fisher opened their first store, located in San Francisco on Ocean Avenue. Mrs. Fisher suggested the name as a reference to the generation gap as part of selling Levi's jeans, as well as records and cassette tapes; the original name considered was "Pants and Discs".
- Born: Oliver Geissen, German TV talk show host; in Hamburg

== August 22, 1969 (Friday) ==
- Tran Van Huong was fired as Prime Minister of South Vietnam by President Nguyen Van Thieu. ARVN General Tran Thien Khiem was appointed in his place the next day to head a new government.

== August 23, 1969 (Saturday) ==
- Omani nationalists from the Popular Front for the Liberation of the Occupied Arabian Gulf took advantage of a heavy monsoon storm to seize control of the Arabian Sea coastal town of Raysut, the administrative center of the Dhofar Governorate, the far western sector of the British protectorate of Oman. With the Sultan's Armed Forces (SAF) unable to save him by land, sea or air, the Omani governor, Hamid bin Said, was arrested, tried by the nationalists and, after being convicted of being a "British agent", shot. His 22 employees were released, and the PFLOAG proceeded to liberate the rest of Oman.

== August 24, 1969 (Sunday) ==
- The first publicized revolt of American soldiers in the Vietnam War took place when "A" Company of the 196th Brigade of the Americal Division refused to obey the orders of the U.S. Army lieutenant who was commanding them. The battalion commander, Lt. Col. Robert C. Bacon, traveled to the area the next day and reassigned the lieutenant to another position.

== August 25, 1969 (Monday) ==
- Three weeks after U.S. President Nixon's letter to North Vietnam's President Ho Chi Minh was sent, representatives of the ailing 79-year old North Vietnamese leader sent a reply that would be described as "uncompromising"; a historian would later write that "Ho neither read Nixon's letter nor did he pen the reply"; President Ho would pass away eight days later, on September 2.

== August 26, 1969 (Tuesday) ==
- The Nova Scotia Supreme Court awarded ownership of $700,000 (Canadian dollars) worth of gold and silver coins to the treasure hunter who had discovered it in the wreckage of a ship that had sunk exactly 244 years earlier. The French ship, Le Chameau, had sunk during a storm on August 26, 1725, as it approached Cape Breton, with the loss of the 310 people on board and the coins that had been sent to pay workers in Nova Scotia. On September 18, 1965, Alex Storm relocated the ship about 15 miles (24 km) off of the coast of Louisbourg, 70 feet (21 m) underwater, and had to file suit against the Canadian government for the rights to the treasure.
- Sixteen of the 94 passengers on board Aeroflot Flight 1770 were killed when the Ilyushin Il-18 jet burst into flames upon landing in Moscow. The crew had failed to deploy the landing gear upon completion of the flight from Norilsk. The Soviet press made no effort to conceal the disaster, which had been witnessed by numerous foreign visitors at Moscow's Vnukovo International Airport.
- Born: Glenn Berger, American film screenwriter; in Smithtown, New York
- Died:
  - Donald "Shorty" Shea, 35, American film stuntman. Shea was murdered by the followers of Charles Manson after the group had been released from jail following an August 16 raid on the Spahn Ranch, where the "Manson Family" lived and where Shea worked. His remains would be located at the ranch nine years later, on December 15, 1977.
  - Paddy Martinez, 88, Navajo American shepherd who discovered a source of uranium ore and began a rush for prospectors to New Mexico in the late 1940s.
  - Ismail al-Azhari, 68, President of the Sudan (1954-1969)
  - Alejandro G. Abadilla, 63, Filipino poet and author known as "AGA"

== August 27, 1969 (Wednesday) ==
- Pioneer E, a $4,500,000 American space probe that had been designated as "Pioneer 10" and was intended to be the fifth in a series of probes orbiting the Sun, was destroyed along with the $2.5 million Delta rocket that was taking it into orbit and a $500,000 communications satellite that had been the other part of the payload. The booster rocket veered off course over the Atlantic Ocean, and ground control at Cape Kennedy sent the destruct command. Three years later, the next launch in the Pioneer series would be designated as the new Pioneer 10 and, even later, would become the first object launched from Earth to travel out of the Solar System.
- South Vietnam's President Nguyen Van Thieu ordered the release of 44 prisoners of war and 54 convicted criminals, and reduced the sentences of 470 other people as part of an amnesty in conjunction with the Buddhist Festival of Wandering Souls (Tet Trung Nguyen).
- Died:
  - Erika Mann, 63, German journalist and actress
  - Ivy Compton-Burnett, 85, English novelist

== August 28, 1969 (Thursday) ==
- The United States made its 31st, and last, test of a nuclear rocket engine at the Nevada Test Site, carrying out experiment codenamed "XE Prime". The first test, "Kiwi", had been on July 1, 1959. A report would later note that the nuclear rocket engine tests "generally released small amounts" of radioactivity compared to atmospheric nuclear weapons testing.
- The withdrawal of 25,000 American troops from the Vietnam War, ordered by U.S. President Nixon in the first cutback of the U.S. commitment to Southeast Asia, was completed, a little more than seven weeks after it had started. Most of the troops came from the U.S. Army 9th Infantry Division and from some U.S. Marine air squadron units.
- Born: Jack Black (Thomas Jacob Black), American actor and comedian; in Santa Monica, California

== August 29, 1969 (Friday) ==
- The first hijacking, outside of the Western Hemisphere, of a United States commercial airline flight took place when TWA Flight 840 from Rome to Tel Aviv was commandeered by terrorist Leila Khaled and an accomplice, Salid Issawi. Khaled, a member of the Popular Front for the Liberation of Palestine boarded the flight at Rome's Fiumicino airport with carry-on luggage that included pistols and hand grenades, forced her way into the airplane's cabin, and dropped the pin of one of the grenades at the pilot's feet, and ordered him to fly the Boeing 707 to Damascus. After the plane landed, the 95 passengers and the 12 crew were allowed to evacuate. Khaled and Issawi then threw the grenades into the cockpit and destroyed the front section of the jet, which would later be repaired and returned to use by TWA.
- Parliamentary elections were held in the west African nation of Ghana for the 140 seats in the National Assembly for the first time since the military overthrow of the Ghanaian government in 1966. The Progress Party, led by Dr. Kofi Busia, won 105 of the seats, and Busia became the new civilian Prime Minister of Ghana on September 3.
- The "poverty line" now in use by the United States government was first announced. Although the amount would be adjusted for inflation to reflect changes in the Consumer Price Index, the definition of the poverty level would remain unchanged for the next fifty years.
- Born:
  - Lucero (stage name for Lucero Hogaza Leon), Mexican pop music singer; in Mexico City
  - Joe Swail, Northern Ireland snooker player; in Belfast

== August 30, 1969 (Saturday) ==
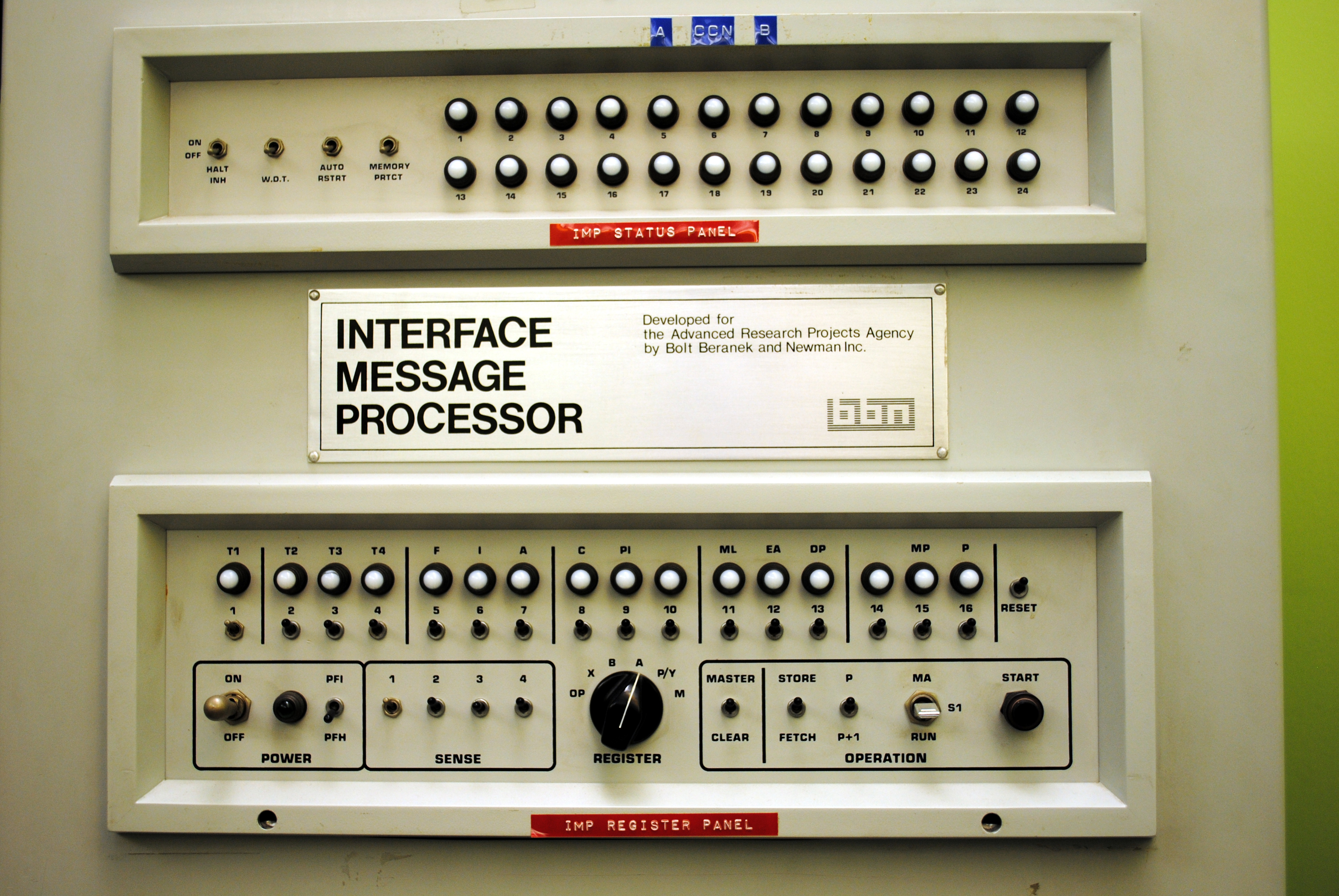
The IMP at UCLA

- The very first Interface Message Processor (IMP), a set of electronic switches designed to communicate from one computer to others on a network, was delivered to UCLA from Bolt Beranek and Newman Inc. (now BBN Technologies) as the first part of the ARPANET computer network, predecessor to the Internet. Over the next three months, IMPs would be installed at Stanford University, the University of California, Santa Barbara (UCSB) and at the University of Utah.
- Born: Kent Osborne, American TV screenwriter
- Died: Vladislav Anisovich, 61, Soviet Russian painter

== August 31, 1969 (Sunday) ==
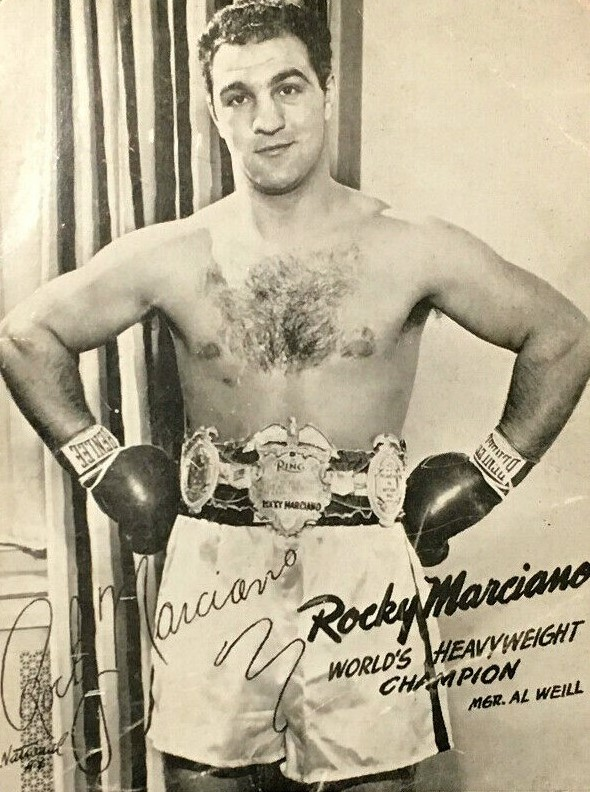
Rocky Marciano

- Rocky Marciano, the only undefeated world heavyweight boxing champion in history, was killed in the crash of a Cessna 172 airplane that was taking him from Chicago to Des Moines, along with pilot Glen Belz and another passenger, insurance salesman and family friend Frank Farrell. Flying at night, the Cessna ran out of fuel as it approached Des Moines. Belz attempted an emergency landing at Newton, Iowa, and struck the ground two miles short of the runway at 9:05 in the evening. Marciano, born Rocco Francis Marchegiano, had a pro boxing record of 49 wins and no losses upon his retirement in 1956 after almost four years as champion. His death came on the eve of his 46th birthday. Marciano and Farrell were making the flight to Des Moines for a birthday party at the Farrell home, after which the former champion would have flown back to his home at Fort Lauderdale, Florida.
- Born: Andrew Cunanan, American spree killer; in National City, California (committed suicide, 1997)
