= September 1969 =

Month of 1969

<<	September 1969					>>
Su	Mo	Tu	We	Th	Fr	Sa
	1	2	3	4	5	6
7	8	9	10	11	12	13
14	15	16	17	18	19	20
21	22	23	24	25	26	27
28	29	30

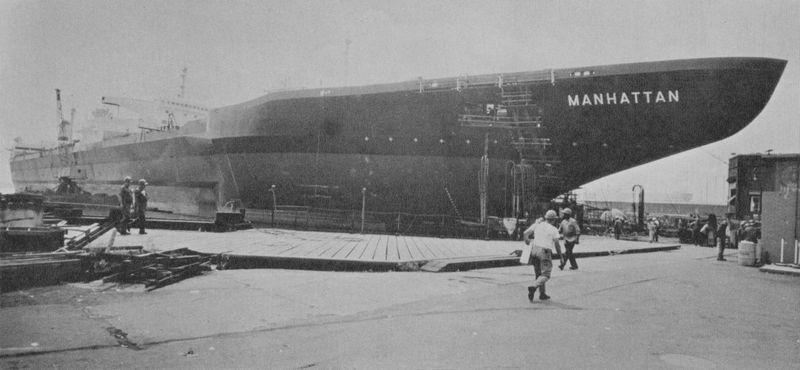
September 14, 1969: SS Manhattan achieves 500-year old dream, opens Northwest Passage

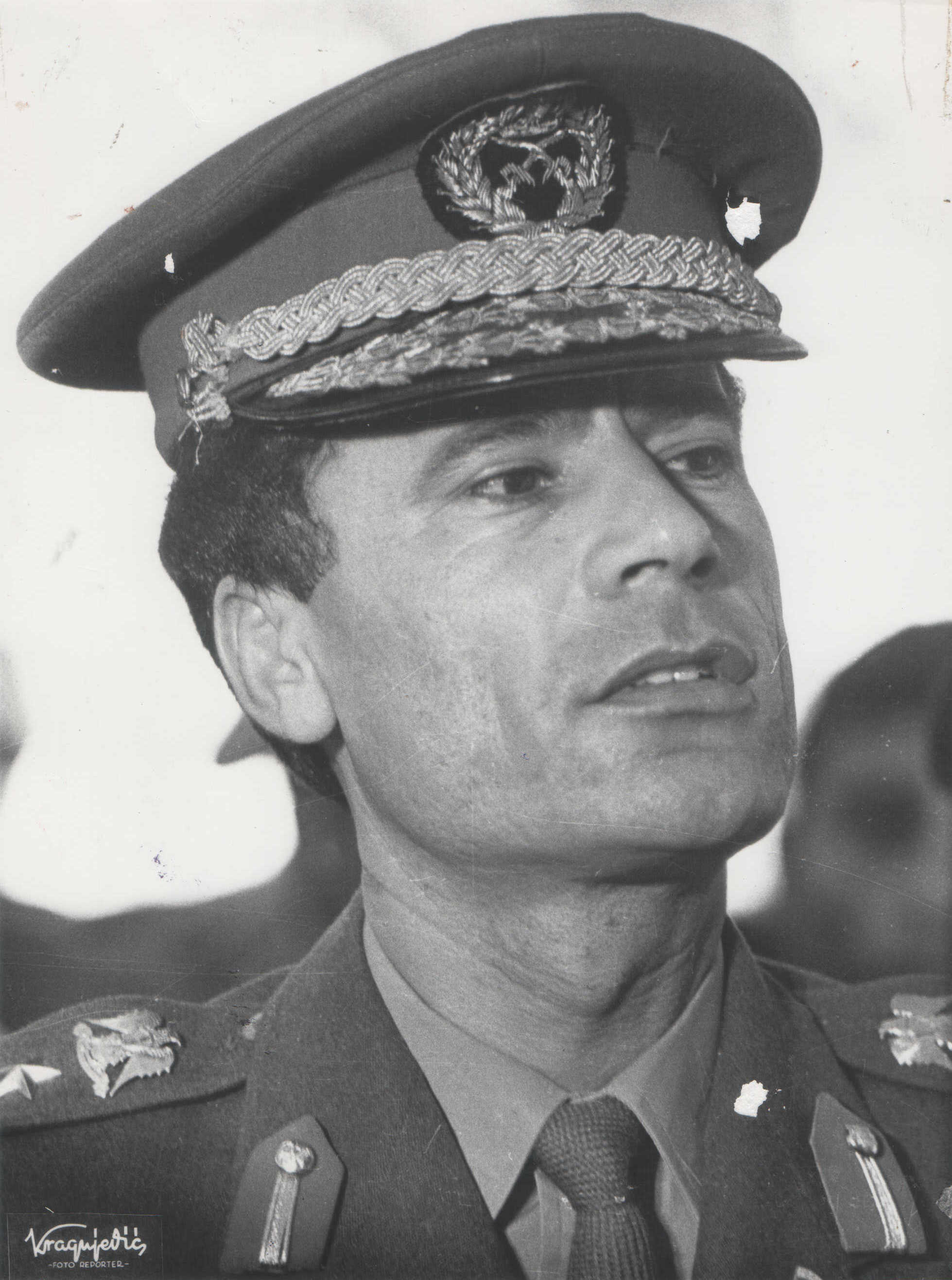
September 1, 1969: Muammar Gaddafi takes over Libya

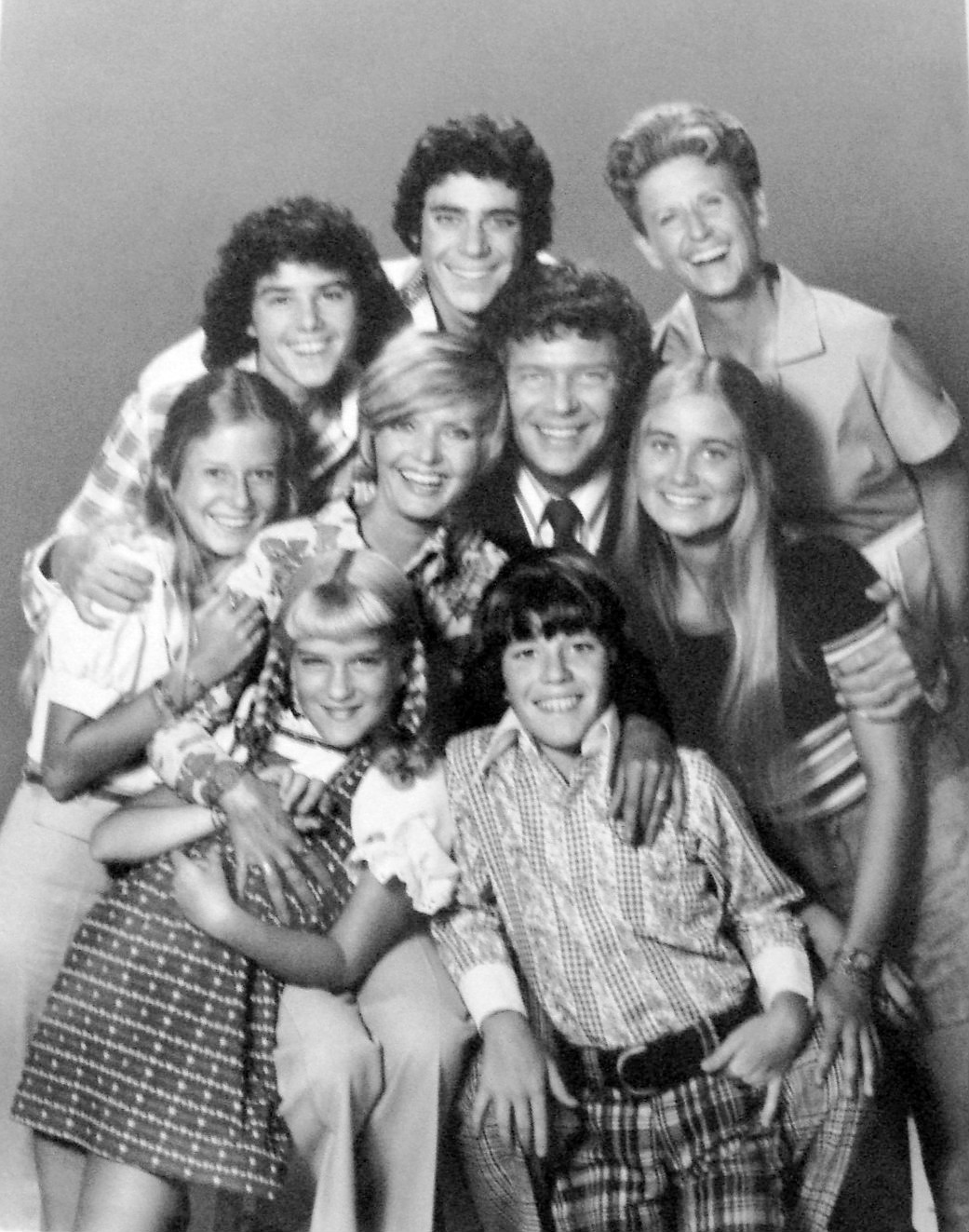
September 26, 1969: The Brady Bunch is introduced

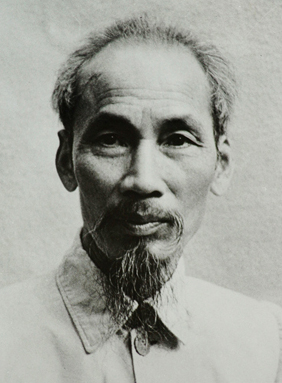
September 2, 1969: Ho Chi Minh dies as Vietnam War continues

The following events occurred in September 1969:

== September 1, 1969 (Monday) ==
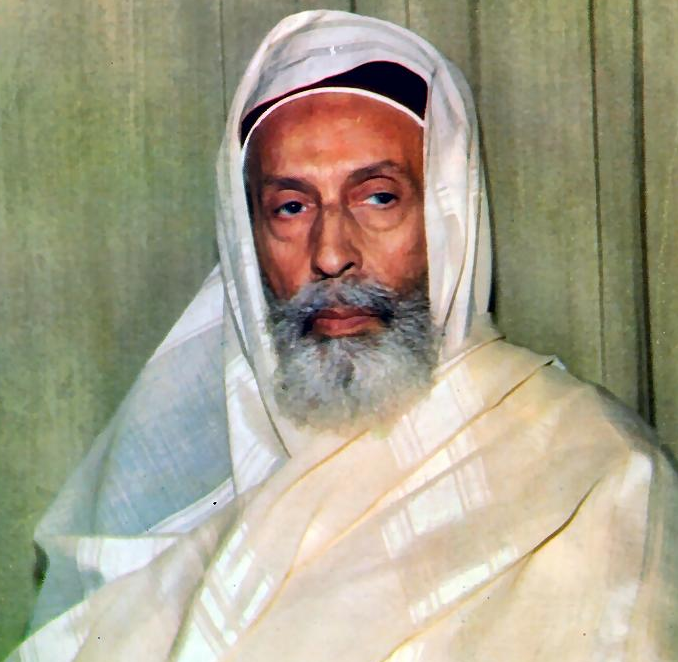
Idris, the last King of Libya

- A bloodless coup d'état ousted King Idris I of Libya and replaced it with a 12-member group of young officers who formed the Revolutionary Command Council that implemented an end to the traditional rule of older families; soon, the leader of the Council would be identified as a 27-year-old Libyan Army colonel, Muammar Gaddafi. The king had traveled out of the country to Turkey for medical treatment. King Idris's nephew, Crown Prince Hassan el-Rida, appeared on a radio broadcast that evening to announce his "voluntary abdication" from serving as the "acting monarch" during Idris's absence, and called on Libyan citizens to support the new government. The coup's leader was initially identified as Colonel Saad Eddine Abbou Chouireb, declared the end of the monarchy and the creation of the Libyan Revolutionary Command Council to rule the new republic. Gaddafi, one of the council members, would be the President of the Islamic Republic of Libya until his own overthrow and death in 2011.
- Jornal Nacional, the first live national news program on Brazilian television, went on the air for the first time, with anchors Cid Moreira and Hilton Gomes. At 7:45 in the evening, Moreira began with the program's slogan "No ar, Jornal Nacional. A notícia unindo 70 milhões de brasileiros" ("On the air, Jornal Nacional— the news uniting 70 million Brazilians"). Jornal Nacional was based in Rio de Janeiro and telecast over the TV Globo network to the three Globo affiliates in Rio, São Paulo and Porto Alegre.
- All 22 people on board Aeroflot Flight 55 were killed when the plane crashed into a mountain in the Soviet Union above the Arctic Circle. The airliner was making its approach to Egvekinot after a flight from Anadyr.
- Born: Melissa Doi, American senior manager at IQ Financial Systems and one of the victims who died in the September 11 attacks. She is known for the recording of a 9-1-1 call she made during her final moments inside the South Tower as the tower began to collapse; in New York City
- Died: Drew Pearson, 71, American newspaper columnist

== September 2, 1969 (Tuesday) ==
Bishop Pike

- James Pike, the controversial Episcopalian American evangelist and the church's former Bishop of California, disappeared after his car broke down while he was driving across the Judaean Desert west of the Dead Sea in Israel. Pike and his wife, Diana, walked through the desert in search of help until Pike became ill and his wife continued searching for help. Mrs. Pike was rescued by a Bedouin Arab and survived. Bishop Pike was found dead six days later by a search team; while he had survived the heat after finding a source of fresh water, he had attempted to climb up the walls of a steep canyon and was killed when he fell.
- The first successful communication from one computer to another by Interface Message Processor (IMP) took place at UCLA, the University of California in Los Angeles, three days after the delivery of the first IMP to the university's computer building. The software programming written by a team of engineers led by Leonard Kleinrock, accommodated the packet switching technology of the IMP which was linked to UCLA's mainframe computer by telephone line and "the two machines began talking to each other" in an intramural dialogue, opening the way for a computer in one location to transmit data directly to any other computer in the world with an IMP. The next step would be on October 1 with the installation of an IMP at the Stanford Research Institute.
- The first automatic teller machine in the United States, called the "Docuteller", was installed at a branch of the Chemical Bank at 10 North Village Avenue in Rockville Centre, New York.
- Born: Cedric "K-Ci" Hailey, American R&B singer for K-Ci & JoJo (with his brother Joel "JoJo" Hailey) and Jodeci; in Monroe, North Carolina
- Died: Ho Chi Minh, 79, President of North Vietnam. A radio broadcast from Hanoi the next day announced that Ho had died of a heart attack at 9:47 on Wednesday morning and informed listeners that "Everyone tried their utmost and gave of their best to save him at any price, but because of his advanced age and serious illness of the sudden severe heart attack, President Ho left us forever."

== September 3, 1969 (Wednesday) ==
- U.S. Marine General Leonard F. Chapman Jr., the Commandant of the Marine Corps, issued orders immediately changing some policies within the Corps to bring an end to racial violence while maintaining discipline against persons of any race who failed to live up the standards of the United States Marines, acknowledging discrimination in the past, making concessions to African-American culture, and ordering that "legitimate grievances" of racial discrimination would "receive sympathetic consideration and rapid response."
- The Chicago Cubs, who had the best record in baseball's National League (84 wins, 52 losses) and who were in first place in the NL's East Division, five games ahead of the New York Mets with 26 games left to play, began an 8-game losing streak with a 2–0 defeat by the Cincinnati Reds. The Mets, on the other hand, began a winning streak the next day that would eventually see them capture the division title and, soon afterward, the 1969 World Series.
- Born:
  - John Fugelsang, American actor, writer, comedian and politician commentator; in Long Island
  - Noah Baumbach, American film director and screenwriter; in Brooklyn
- Died: John Lester, 98, American cricket star and captain of the United States team during international matches between 1894 and 1908

== September 4, 1969 (Thursday) ==
- Charles B. Elbrick, the United States Ambassador to Brazil, was kidnapped after guerrillas of the 8th October Revolutionary Movement group stopped his limousine at a roadblock in Rio de Janeiro. The "MR–8" group left the limo driver with a letter setting a 48-hour ultimatum for Brazil's military government to release 15 political prisoners and to publish the MR–8 manifesto, or face the execution of the Ambassador. After three days and six hours in captivity, Ambassador Elbrick was released unharmed after the 15 prisoners were taken from prison and flown to Mexico City.
- Born: Giorgi Margvelashvili, President of Georgia from 2013 to 2018; in Tbilisi, Georgian SSR, Soviet Union

== September 5, 1969 (Friday) ==
- U.S. Army Lieutenant William Calley was charged with six counts of premeditated murder for the 1968 My Lai Massacre deaths of over 109 South Vietnamese civilians. The story itself would be made public by two different investigative journalists two months later. Calley would be court martialed and sentenced to life imprisonment in March 1971, but would be paroled on September 10, 1975, after serving all but three years of his incarceration under house arrest.
- Born: Dweezil Zappa, American singer and actor; as Ian Donald Calvin Euclid Zappa in Los Angeles

== September 6, 1969 (Saturday) ==
- The government of Portugal acted to suppress and censor an interview of former Portuguese dictator Antonio de Oliveira Salazar, published in that day's edition of the Paris newspaper L'Aurore. Salazar, who had ruled Portugal from 1932 until suffering a 1968 stroke that put him in a coma, had never been told after awaking that he had been replaced as the nation's ruler. He was quoted in the interview as saying that he looked forward to resuming his duties as soon as he could "gather enough strength"; his housekeeper told the interviewer that the former dictator remained unaware.
- The very first episode of Sid and Marty Krofft’s “H.R. Pufnstuf” is aired on the NBC television network in the United States.
- Born:
  - CeCe Peniston, American singer and former beauty Queen; in Dayton, Ohio
  - Brian Barczyk, American reptile enthusiast and YouTuber (d. 2024)
- Died: Arthur Friedenreich, 77, Brazilian soccer football player credited with at least 1,239 goals in his career during the amateur era between 1909 and 1935, and holder of the world record at the time of his death. Franz Binder, who played in Austria between 1933 and 1949, was second with 1,006 goals.

== September 7, 1969 (Sunday) ==
- Princeton University, an all-male Ivy League college for its first 233 years of operation, welcomed its first female undergraduate students as 171 young women jointed the 4,600 men already enrolled. New York's Daily News, reflecting the attitudes of the day, reported that many of "the girls" were wearing "chic miniskirts" as they walked to class from Pyne Hall, the campus' first dormitory for women.
- Born:
  - Jimmy Urine (stage name for James Euringer), American electropunk musician and founder of Mindless Self Indulgence; in New York City
  - Diane Farr, American TV star known for NUMB3RS; in La Cañada Flintridge, California
- Died:
  - Everett Dirksen, 73, Republican U.S. Senator for Illinois since 1951 and Senate Minority Leader since 1959. Dirksen suffered cardiac arrest while recovering from surgery six days earlier for lung cancer.
  - Gavin Maxwell, 55, Scottish naturalist for whom the otter subspecies Lutrogale perspicillata maxwelli ("Maxwell's Otter") is named, died of cancer.

== September 8, 1969 (Monday) ==
- All 32 people aboard SATENA Airlines Flight 742 were killed when the plane crashed during a storm. The Colombian DC-3 airliner was flying to Apiay after taking off from Villavicencio on a multistop flight that had originated in Bogota.
- Mahmud Sulayman al-Maghribi, a physician, was named by the Libyan Arab Republic's new Revolutionary Council to be the new Prime Minister of Libya.
- Jamaica changed from the British Pound to the Jamaican Dollar as part of its transition from a colony to a fully independent state
- Born:
  - Gary Speed, Welsh soccer football midfielder who had a record 535 appearances in the Premier League, as well as 85 games for the Wales national team, which he later managed; in Mancot, Flintshire (committed suicide, 2011)
  - Rachel Hunter, New Zealand supermodel and TV host; in Glenfield
- Died: Bud Collyer (Clayton Heermance, Jr.), 61, American voice actor who voiced Superman on radio and in cartoons, and radio and TV game show host who was the first emcee for Beat the Clock and To Tell the Truth.

== September 9, 1969 (Tuesday) ==
- Allegheny Airlines Flight 853 collided in flight with a small Piper PA-28 airplane, killing the 82 passengers and crew on the DC-9 jet airliner and the private plane pilot. Flight 853 was approaching Indianapolis from Cincinnati, on a multi-stop flight that had started in Boston and had a final destination of St. Louis. Robert W. Carey, a student pilot, had taken off from McCordsville, Indiana on a short flight to Columbus; he was killed after the Piper struck the DC-9's tail. Wreckage of the DC-9 and the bodies of persons on board were thrown by the impact across a wide area near Fairland, Indiana, including the nearby Shady Acres Trailer Court with 82 mobile homes, but none of the onlookers were injured. Among the factors in the collision were that the Piper hadn't shown up on the radarscope when the Indianapolis controllers who had cleared the airliner for its descent to 2,500 feet (760 m) into the path of the Piper which had been at 3,550 feet (1,080 m).

== September 10, 1969 (Wednesday) ==
- With 22 games remaining in the 1969 National League baseball season, the New York Mets, who had never finished higher than ninth place in their history, overtook the Chicago Cubs to take the lead in the East Division's pennant race. The Mets, who had been 9½ games behind the Cubs four weeks earlier, were now one game ahead (83 wins, 57 losses) of the 84–59 Cubs, after beating the Montreal Expos twice in a double header, while the Cubs continued to lose.
- The United States Atomic Energy Commission carried out Project Rulison, detonating a 40 kiloton nuclear bomb 8,442 feet (2,573 m) below Battlement Mesa in the Rocky Mountains of Colorado in order to reach a rich supply of natural gas deposits. The blast was set off within a few miles of the small town of Parachute, Colorado, known at the time as "Grand Valley".
- The Baseball Encyclopedia, at the time the most comprehensive compilation of historical statistics for any sport, was released by Macmillan Publishers after being compiled, cross-referenced and verified with the aid of 29-year old computer programmer Neil Armann.
- Born: Ai Jing, Chinese female vocalist and folk rock singer; in Shenyang

== September 11, 1969 (Thursday) ==
- One month after troops from the Soviet Union and China had fought battles over a border dispute, Soviet Premier Alexei Kosygin made a surprise visit to Beijing where he conferred at the airport with Chinese Premier Zhou Enlai. Kosygin, who was on his way back from Hanoi following the funeral of North Vietnam's President Ho Chi Minh, had what the Soviets described as "a conversation useful for both sides" before flying on to Moscow. The lack of details from either government led observers to conclude that the brief meeting during Kosygin's stopover would have accomplished little. The meeting was the first between Soviet and Chinese leaders since 1965.
- A moderate annular solar eclipse was visible in Pacific, Peru, Bolivia, Brazil, and covered 96.904% of the Sun. The moon's apparent diameter was smaller, occurring only 5.2 days after apogee (Apogee on September 6, 1969).

== September 12, 1969 (Friday) ==
- Philippine Air Lines Flight 158 crashed into a hill near the Manila suburb of Antipolo, killing 45 of the 47 people on board. The BAC One-Eleven jet was nearing the end of a flight from Cebu to Manila.
- Born:
  - Ángel Cabrera, Argentine professional golfer and winner of the U.S. Open (2007) and the Masters Tournament (2009); in Córdoba
  - Shigeki Maruyama, Japanese professional golfer, 1997 Japan PGA Championship winner; in Ichikawa, Chiba

== September 13, 1969 (Saturday) ==
- The iconic cartoon dog, Scooby-Doo, was introduced to Saturday morning television as part of a response by the three American TV networks to complaints that cartoons had become too violent, after three years of superhero and adventure shows. Hanna-Barbera co-producer Joseph Barbera told reporters that "Violence will be out of children's programming this fall," and explained that "Scooby-Doo, Where Are You! is a series about a chicken-hearted Great Dane which, along with four high school students, solves tales of the supernatural," and predicted that the combination of "comedy and music, which we've always known to be popular with kids" could be marketed successfully.
- Born:
  - Tyler Perry, American TV and film actor and producer, known for portraying the title role in the popular Madea series of films; as Emmitt Perry Jr. in New Orleans
  - Shane Warne, Australian cricketer; in Upper Ferntree Gully, Victoria (d. 2022)

== September 14, 1969 (Sunday) ==
- The American oil tanker SS Manhattan became the first commercial ship to successfully travel through the Northwest Passage, from the Atlantic Ocean to the Pacific Ocean, an achievement that the New York Times described at the time would "raise the prospect of a commercial route that merchant voyagers have dreamed of for 500 years."
- Hundreds of people on and near the southern coast of South Korea were killed by floods from the downpour of 14 inches (360 mm) of rain during the afternoon. Early reports noted the recovery of 257 bodies and at least 81 people missing, while at least 60,000 were homeless.
- Men celebrating their 19th birthday or any other birthday from 20 to 26 years old would find themselves to be the ones given highest priority for military service by the draft lottery that would take place on December 1, 1969.
- The Disney anthology series became The Wonderful World of Disney.
- Born: Bong Joon-ho, South Korean film director; in Daegu

== September 15, 1969 (Monday) ==
- Baseball pitcher Steve Carlton of the St. Louis Cardinals set a Major League Baseball record by striking out 19 players in a nine-inning game, taking different members of the New York Mets to strike three; but the first-place Mets won anyway, 4–3, because one of their players, Ron Swoboda, hit two home runs with men on base.

== September 16, 1969 (Tuesday) ==
- The city of Glenn Heights, Texas was formally incorporated as a suburb of Dallas. With a population of 257 people in a 30-acre mobile home park owned by Dallas firefighter Moe Craddock, the independent town was originally created from petition and approval of citizens to prevent the trailers from being annexed by the nearby Dallas County city of DeSoto. In its first twenty years, its population would quadruple to more than 1,000 and then to more than 4,500, and by 2010 to more than 11,000 residents.
- Born: Justine Frischmann, British rock musician for Elastica; in Twickenham, London

== September 17, 1969 (Wednesday) ==
- At least 80 people were killed in the capsizing of a passenger ferry that was attempting to cross South Korea's Nakdong River from Namji-eup to Daechi-ri within Changnyeong County in South Gyeongsang Province. Another 20 people on the ferry were able to swim to shore.
- Born:
  - Keith Flint, English singer, dancer and frontman of the electronic dance act The Prodigy; in Redbridge, London (d. 2019)
  - Matthew Settle, American TV actor known for Gossip Girl and Band of Brothers; in Hickory, North Carolina
  - Ken Doherty, Irish professional snooker player and 1997 world champion; in Ranelagh, Dublin

== September 18, 1969 (Thursday) ==
- The U.S. House of Representatives voted, 339 to 70, to approve a proposed 26th Amendment to the United States Constitution that, if approved by two-thirds of the U.S. Senate and then ratified by 38 of the 50 state legislatures of the United States, would abolish the United States Electoral College and would allow the President of the United States to be elected directly by the voters. Under the proposal, the candidate with the highest number of votes would win the presidency provided that he or she had received at least 40% of the votes cast. If no candidate received 40% of the votes, then a runoff election would be held between the two candidates who had the highest and second highest number. While the U.S. Senate appeared to be in favor, and U.S. President Nixon had announced his support for the bill, a filibuster against the bill was made by Democrat Senator Sam Ervin (who would later gain fame as chairman of the Watergate Hearings in 1973) of South Carolina. Votes for cloture to end the filibuster fell short of the required two-thirds majority, with the final vote for cloture being 53 in favor, 34 against on September 29, after which the Senate abandoned the legislation.
- Born: Cappadonna (stage name for Darryl Hill), American rapper and member of Wu-Tang Clan and Theodore Unit; in New York City

== September 19, 1969 (Friday) ==
- Libya's new Prime Minister Maghribi announced that the new Libyan Arab Republic would not renew the leases of American and British military bases on Libyan territory. The U.S. Wheelus Air Base and the British RAF El Adem would both be turned over to Libyan control in 1970.
- Born: Simona Păucă, Romanian gymnast and 1984 gold medalist; in Azuga

== September 20, 1969 (Saturday) ==
- At a meeting between The Beatles (minus George Harrison) and business manager Allen Klein, John Lennon announced his intention to quit the group, effectively bringing an end to the "Fab Four". McCartney would recount later that he suggested possible future plans for the band, and Lennon, referring to his first wife, shouted "I want a divorce! Like the one I got from Cynthia," and, after a brief argument, Lennon, his wife Yoko Ono, and Klein walked out.
- U.S. Senator Gaylord Nelson of Wisconsin gave a speech to the Washington Environmental Council in Seattle and made the first proposal for what would become, on April 22, 1970 and on April 22 thereafter, "Earth Day". Nelson said that he planned to set aside a day during the upcoming spring "for college scientists, public leaders, students and faculty to discuss threats to the ecology of the world."
- All but one of the 75 people on an Air Vietnam airliner flight were killed after a mid-air collision with a U.S. Air Force F-4. Both the DC-4 and the USAF jet were approaching Da Nang when the faster Phantom clipped the wing of the civilian flight from Pleiku. The DC-4 crashed into a field, killing two farmworkers on the ground.
- The very last theatrical Warner Bros. cartoon, the Merrie Melodies short Injun Trouble, was released, bringing an end to an era when feature films were preceded by brief cartoons.

== September 21, 1969 (Sunday) ==
- Mexicana Airlines Flight 801 from Chicago lost power as it was approaching Mexico City, killing 22 of the 111 passengers, and all but two of the seven crew. The death toll was held down by ground conditions, because the Boeing 727 reportedly impacted on "a swampy cushion of mud and water", and many of the passengers in the rear of the plane were thrown free from the fuselage into shallow mud. An investigation would note later that the cause could not be determined in that "No data could be retrieved from the Flight Data Recorder because it had been incorrectly installed two days prior to the accident. The Cockpit Voice Recorder had been removed and no replacement had been installed."
- In one of the most vicious fights in the National Hockey League, and the first in which players had criminal charges brought against them, Ted Green of the Boston Bruins sustained a fractured skull in a fight with Wayne Maki of the St. Louis Blues during a preseason NHL game in Ottawa. According to accounts at the scene, Green struck Maki in the face with his hockey stick, and Maki responded by striking Green in the head with his stick. Green underwent surgery at Ottawa General Hospital and was out for the entire season, while Maki was suspended for the first 30-days of the regular season.

== September 22, 1969 (Monday) ==
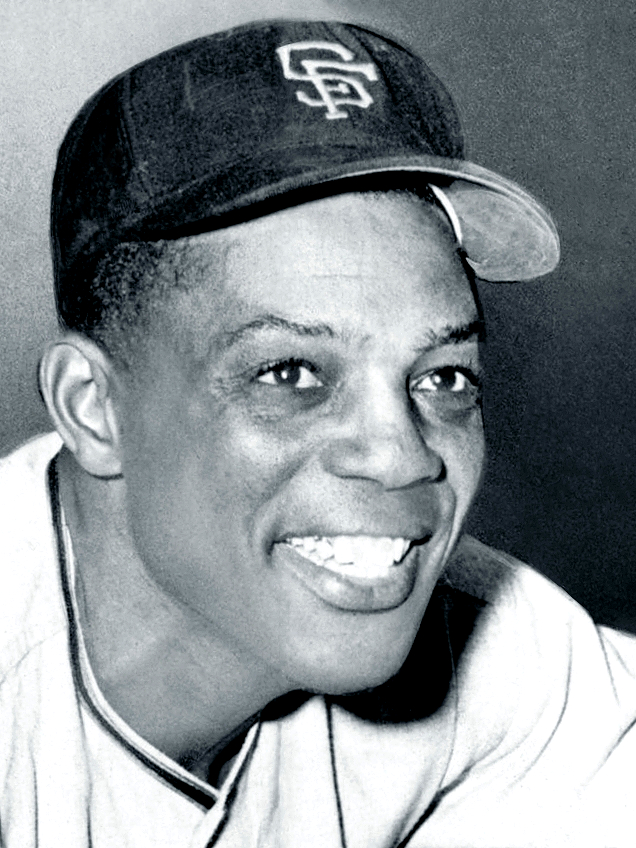
Mays

- Willie Mays of the San Francisco Giants became the first major league baseball player since Babe Ruth to hit 600 career home runs. Mays came in as a pinch hitter in the 7th inning and his two-run homer produced the margin of victory in the Giants' 4–2 win over the San Diego Padres, and put the Giants in first place in their division with eight games left in the season. In the same game, Mays's teammate Bobby Bonds struck out for the 178th time during the season, breaking the Major League Baseball record set by Dave Nicholson of the Chicago White Sox in 1963.
- An Islamic conference in Rabat, Morocco, held after the al-Aqsa Mosque fire on August 21, condemned the Israeli claim of ownership of East Jerusalem.
- Born: Matt Sharp, American rock musician, bassist of Weezer and frontman of The Rentals, in Bangkok, Thailand
- Died: Adolfo López Mateos, 60, President of Mexico from 1958 to 1964

== September 23, 1969 (Tuesday) ==
- The television medical drama Marcus Welby, M.D. premiered on the ABC television network, with Robert Young in the title role, and co-starring James Brolin. In its second year, Marcus Welby, M.D. would finish the season as the most-watched show in the United States.
- Butch Cassidy and the Sundance Kid (directed by George Roy Hill and starring Paul Newman and Robert Redford) opened to a limited release in the United States.

== September 24, 1969 (Wednesday) ==
- Tokyo's daily newspaper Asahi Shimbun announced that it would be the first to deliver an edition electronically to subscribers, to be printed on what was called at the time a "facsimile receiving set" (later called simply a "fax machine"). Using state of the art technology for 1969, the Toshiba machine could produce a 12.5 in (320 mm) wide by 18 in (460 mm) long page in only five minutes.
- The Chicago Eight trial began in Chicago.
- Born: Shawn "Clown" Crahan, heavy metal musician and co-founder of the band Slipknot

== September 25, 1969 (Thursday) ==
- The Organisation of Islamic Cooperation was founded.
- Born:
  - Catherine Zeta-Jones, Welsh stage and film actress, 2003 Oscar winner for best supporting actress and 2010 Tony Award winner for best actress in a musical; in Swansea
  - Hansie Cronje, South African cricketer and national team captain; in Bloemfontein (killed in plane crash, 2002)
  - Hal Sparks, American actor, comedian, musician, and host; in Cincinnati

== September 26, 1969 (Friday) ==
- The Brady Bunch, a situation comedy about a "blended family" created by the union of two people with children from previous marriages, was introduced as one of the new television shows on the ABC network in the United States. Syndicated TV columnist Dick Kleiner described it as having "all the elements of trite-and-true television— a bunch of children (cute) and two parents (appealing) and a dog (lovable) and a maid (witty)" and added that "It all sounds as new and different as this year's model of soap." The San Francisco Examiner commented "the six kids and a dog and a cat, and a maid, and absurd slapstick... made the first show a shambles. Verdict: Too blamed precious."
- The 26 members of the White House Police, the division of the United States Secret Service assigned to stand guard at the residence of the President of the United States, began wearing new uniforms consistent with the colorful garb seen in palace guards in other nations. U.S. President Nixon had decided on the change earlier in the year after his first state visit to Europe as President. The widely-criticized uniforms would be retired shortly after President Nixon's resignation in 1974; in 1980, the federal surplus uniforms would be purchased by the Meriden-Cleghorn High School marching band in Cleghorn, Iowa.
- All 74 people on Lloyd Aéreo Boliviano Flight 155 were killed, including the 16 members of Club The Strongest ("Las Stronguistas") of La Paz, one of the top-ranked teams in the Federación Boliviana de Fútbol (FBF), Bolivia's soccer football league. The Douglas DC-6 was en route to La Paz after departure from Santa Cruz, when it struck Mount Choquetanga. Club The Strongest was returning home after a friendly exhibition against a team in Santa Cruz.
- The Beatles released the last album item that they had recorded together, Abbey Road, with sales hyped by a false rumor that Paul McCartney had died. Beatles fans debate whether Abbey Road (the last recorded before the group broke up) or Let It Be, largely finished but not released until May 1970, should be considered the final work of the group.
- A military coup d'état overthrew the civilian government in Bolivia, as President Luis Adolfo Siles was forced out after only five months in office. Bolivian Army General Alfredo Ovando Candia, the chief of the nation's armed forces and the front-runner for the 1970 presidential campaign, assumed the presidency.

== September 27, 1969 (Saturday) ==
- The Zodiac Killer, who had already murdered four people and shot and wounded two others, attacked two more victims. Cecelia Shephard and Bryan Hartnell, both students at Pacific Union College in San Francisco, had been relaxing at Lake Berryessa when they had the misfortune of being seen by a man with a gun. After ordering the couple at gunpoint to tie each other, the man who identified himself in letters as "Zodiac", stabbed both of them multiple times while they were lying on the ground. Afterwards, "Zodiac" carved the 12/20/68, 7/4/69 and 9/27/69—the dates of his three most recent attacks—into the door of Hartnell's car. Hartnell survived, but Shephard died of her injuries two days later.
- The centennial of the first American college football game was celebrated as Princeton University, which had lost to Rutgers University by a score of 6 goals to 4 on November 6, 1869, visited Rutgers again. Nearly 100 years after what is considered the first game of college football between two colleges, Rutgers won, 29 to 0, on eight scores (four touchdowns, three extra points kicked, and a two-point conversion).
- Died:
  - Imam Abdullah Haron, 45, South African Muslim cleric and anti-apartheid activist, died while in the detention of the South African Ministry of Police. Officially, the police reported that Haron, who had been in solitary confinement since May 28, died after "falling down a flight of stairs" and sustaining two broken ribs.
  - Nicolas Grunitzky, 56, President of Togo from 1963 to 1967, died from injuries sustained in an automobile accident three days earlier.
  - John J. McCabe, 15, American murder victim whose killer was not apprehended for more than 40 years. Walter Shelley, 17 at the time, picked up the hitchhiking victim, accused him of flirting with Shelley's girlfriend, and "bound and gagged him in such a way that it led to his death". The case would not be solved until 2011.

== September 28, 1969 (Sunday) ==
- Elections were held for West Germany's Bundestag. Neither of the two major parties won a majority of the 519 seats, leaving Foreign Minister Willy Brandt's Sozialdemokratische Partei Deutschlands (SPD) (with 237 seats) to compete with Chancellor Kurt Georg Kiesinger's Christian Democratic Union (with 250 seats) to both try to form a coalition with Walter Scheel's Freie Demokratische Partei (FDP) 31 seats to form a coalition government. Brandt would become Chancellor under an SPD and FDP coalition of 268 seats, eight more than needed for a majority.
- Tage Erlander, Prime Minister of Sweden for the past 23 years, announced that he was retiring from the leadership of Sweden's Social Democratic Party and asked the party delegates at the Sveriges socialdemokratiska arbetareparti convention to select a successor.
- Born: Ben Greenman, American author and journalist; in Chicago

== September 29, 1969 (Monday) ==
- The Tulbagh earthquake, the most destructive earthquake in South Africa's history, killed 12 people in the town of Tulbagh, located in the Boland section of the nation's Western Cape province. Nine of the 12 dead were children at an orphanage in Tulbagh for South Africa's biracial coloured population. The quake happened at 10:03 p.m. local time, hours after 40,000 anti-apartheid activists had marched in the funeral procession from central Cape Town to the Muslim Cemetery in Mowbray for the Imam Abdullah Haron.
- Love, American Style, an anthology series with three separate and unrelated stories on each episode, premiered on the ABC television network. The new hour-long show, which aired at 10:00 at night EST, was well-received by critics, including one who called it "the most pleasant and promising new series of the television season." Earlier in the day, the game show Sale of the Century and the soap opera Bright Promise premiered on NBC.
- Born: DeVante Swing (stage name for Donald DeGrate, Jr.), co-founder, with K-Ci, of the R&B group Jodeci; in Hampton, Virginia

== September 30, 1969 (Tuesday) ==
- China's Defense Minister Lin Biao ordered China's armed forces to their highest alert status, out of a belief that the Soviet Union was preparing to launch a massive surprise attack on the 20th anniversary of the October 1, 1949, founding of the People's Republic of China. The day before, China had tested a three megaton hydrogen bomb, its largest up to that time. Because of clashes along the Ussuri River that had been ongoing for six months, China had increased the number of troops deployed to the northern provinces by 20 percent during September.

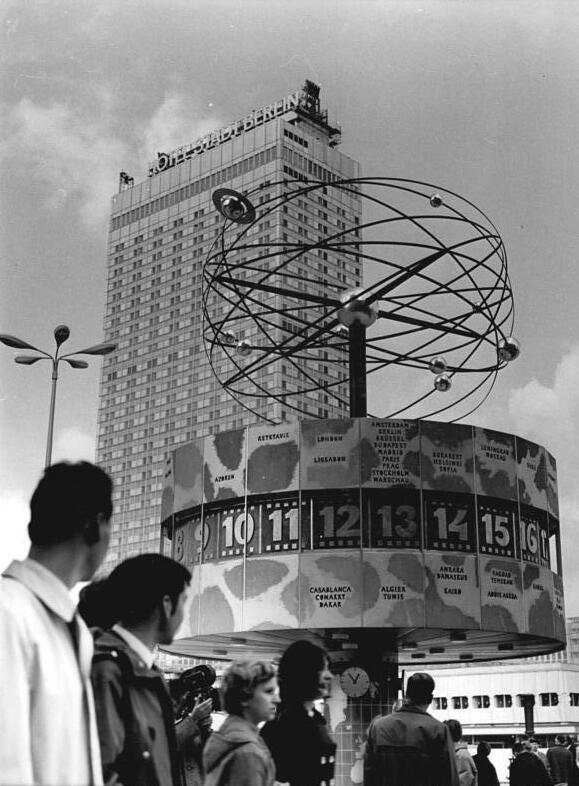
East Berlin's World Clock in 1969

- The World Clock (Weltzeituhr) was unveiled at the Alexanderplatz in what was then East Berlin by the Communist government of East Germany to mark the 20th anniversary of the October 7, 1949 founding of the nation.
- In Morrow, Georgia, Clayton State University held its first classes, opening to 942 students as a two-year institution, Clayton Junior College. In 1986, Clayton State would become a four-year institution and become part of the University System of Georgia. Within 50 years of its founding, the university, would reach an enrollment of more than 7,000 students.
