= Nefew =

Swiss hip-hop band

NEFEW
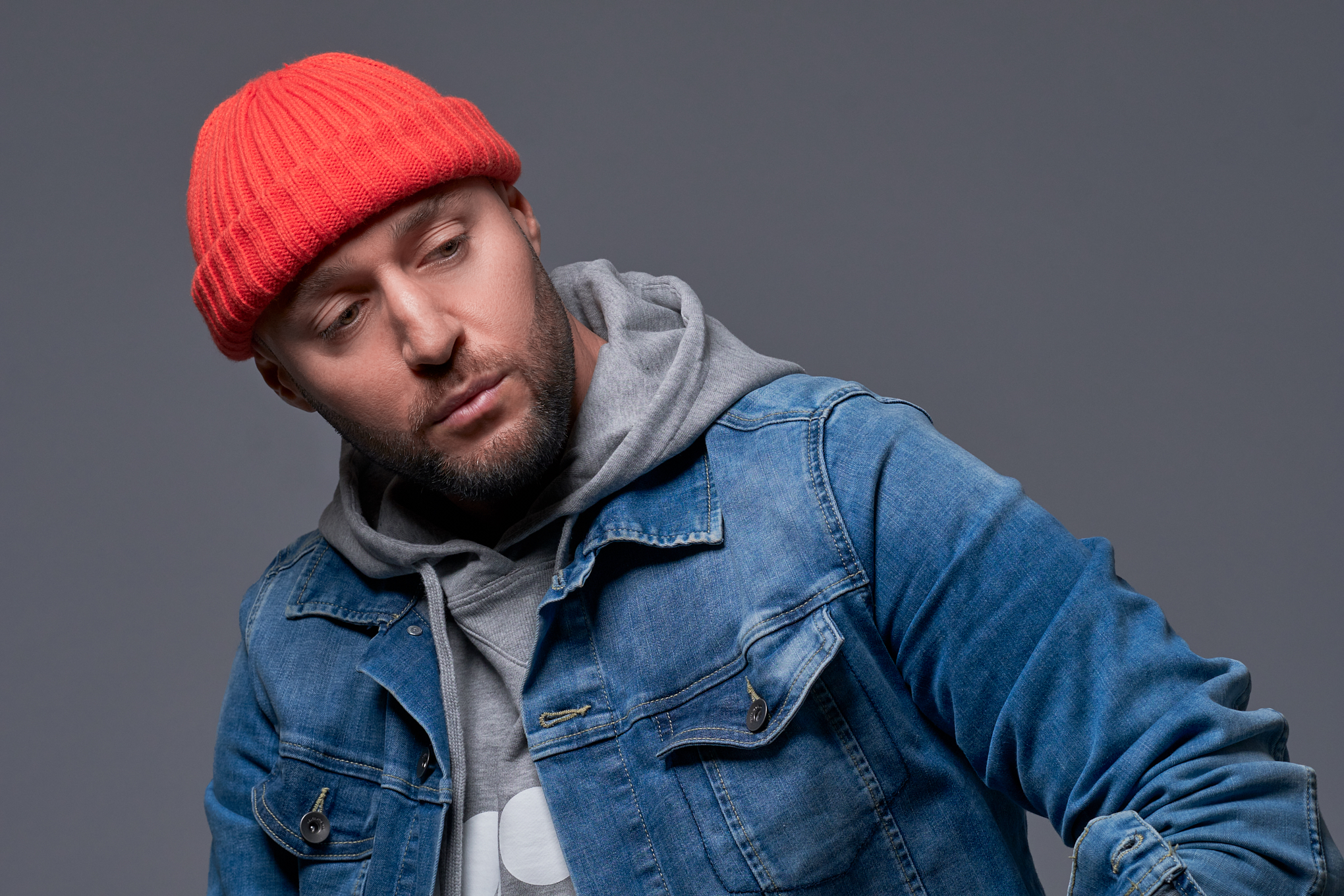

Background information
- Origin: Windisch, Aargau, Switzerland
- Genres: Hip hop
- Years active: 2007–present
- Labels: On Our Feet Ent. (2007–present); Puma (2009–present); Empire (2016–present)
- Members: Polemikk; PA-Double
- Website: www.nefewmusic.com

Nefew (stylised as NEFEW) is a multicultural hip hop group currently based in Switzerland. It consists of Polemikk (MC, producer) and PA-Double (DJ, producer). Nefew is an acronym which stands for New Enlightenment From Every Word. Q Magazine describes Nefew as one of the most promising hip hop acts from Europe. The duo is represented by independent label On Our Feet Ent. and Puma.

NEFEW's musical style is often compared to artists such as Common, Kanye West, 9th Wonder, Kenn Starr and Talib Kweli. Many of the group's productions contain soulful samples, as well as jazz keys and string arrangements.

== Career ==
=== 2007–2010: First album and Puma deal ===
After changing their name to NEFEW, the group took their first big step in 2007, releasing their debut studio album called Off the Cuff, which contains the track Admit It, a collaboration with Brooklyn rappers Wordsworth and Masta Ace. The album received mixed reviews from music critics. musicOMH gave it 2 out of 5 stars, while UK Hip Hop calls it a "well-intentioned if unsurprising slice of underground rap".

In December 2009, Puma began to support NEFEW in the matter of promotion. This allowed the independent duo to reach a much higher number of fans. Nefew are the first hip hop act to be endorsed by the company. Also, Nefew revealed in several interviews that they were negotiating with two major labels. Yet, no record deal is official.

With Puma supporting the group, however, NEFEW released an EP. It was available only on iTunes Music Store. The track Biko features R&B singer Chanj and former GOOD Music signee Consequence, and held number two position in the US College Radio Charts.

=== 2010–2014: Antihero trilogy ===
Antihero Begins came out in April 2010 as a free mixtape. The record had considerable success, not least of all because it was published on highly respected hip hop blog 2dopeboyz.com. Also, Antihero Begins received general acclaim from music critics. Okayplayer gave it 89 out of 100 points:

The title track, the albums curtain call, is an appropriately optimistic celebration of the journey thus far. It is self-celebratory testimony to the group’s determination and initiative. This open-ended finale observes all the attributes that make the groups journey alluring and heroic. And it is the perfect ending for a sequel, something I am excited to hear.

— Simon Day, Okayplayer

After Antihero Begins DJ Green Lantern took notice of the groups work and came up with the idea of a collaboration. In January 2011, Man Vs Many, which is hosted by DJ Green Lantern, was released. Among others, the mixtape features soul singer Dwele and Rapper Nottz. The album was later re-released as a digital album. In October 2011, Nefew released the EP Transitions with German producer 7inch. The EP "For Hip Hop", a collaboration with Nottz and Shakes, followed in 2012.

The most recent studio album is called Rise of the Antihero (released in November 2014). It features various notable artists such as BJ the Chicago Kid, Jared Evan and STS Gold. The album peaked at No. 37 on the Swiss album charts. Nefew intends to release another studio album (The Antihero), concluding the Antihero trilogy.

=== 2015–present: Empire deal ===
Nefew joined forces with record label Empire in 2016. Shortly thereafter, Slides EP was released.

== Discography ==
Studio albums

List of albums, with selected chart positions
Title	Album details	Peak chart positions			
Title	Album details	US	UK	GER	SWI
Off the Cuff	Released: 2007; Label: Out Of Frame; Format: CD, digital download	—	—	—	—
Rise of the Antihero	Released: November 28, 2014; Label: On Our Feet Ent., Nation Music, Groove Attack; Format: CD, digital download	—	—	—	37
"—" denotes a title that did not chart, or was not released in that territory.

EPs

- 1999: Lyrical Quarrel (as Emphacized Prophecy)
- 2003: Pieces of Forsaken Times (as Emphacized Prophecy)
- 2009: Homesick EP
- 2011: Transitions (with 7inch)
- 2016: Slides EP

Free mixtapes

- 2007: Tales of the Dago (Polemikk and Tony Sicily)
- 2010: Antihero Begins
- 2011: Man Vs Many (presented by DJ Green Lantern)
- 2012: For Hip-Hop (with Nottz & Shakes)
- 2014: ROTAH EP

Singles

- 2007: Admit It (feat. Wordsworth & Masta Ace)

Featured singles

- 2009: Best Men DJs – Wedding Crashers (feat. Seven & Nefew)
- 2014: Big Boys – Only One (feat. Mickey Blue & Nefew)

Also appeared on

- 2007: Rotosphere – Rotosphere (Is Outta Here) (feat. Polemikk)
- 2008: Torae – I Don't Care (feat. Nefew)
- 2008: DJ Age & Costa – Pickin’ Up the Pieces (feat. Souleez, Teichoskopie & Nefew)
- 2008: Splash Compilation: Nefew – Because I Can
- 2009: Jonas – Sensational Remix (feat. Nefew)
- 2009: Portefank – Let's Go! (feat. Polemikk)
- 2010: Loufonq – Low (feat. Nefew)
- 2010: Ruck N' Wiz – Changes You Made (feat. Nefew)
- 2010: Juice #108: Nefew – Day by Day
- 2011: Mediate Souls – Let it come (feat. Nefew)
- 2012: Knightstalker – Paid To Lose (feat. Nefew & Souleez)
- 2012: Nekst86 – Friss das! (feat. Nefew)
- 2013: Damon Daye – Give A Sh*T (feat. Nefew)
- 2013: DJ ZID – It's Your Life (DJ ZID Remix) (feat. Nefew)
- 2014: Maxxwell – Backstabber (feat. Nefew)

Produced

- 2010: Knightstalker – Late Knight Show (produced by Nefew)
- 2012: Steno – Storie Di Una Storia (produced by Polemikk)
- 2012: Knightstalker – End of the Tunnel (produced by PA-Double)
