= Balance (Masta Killa album) =

Studio album by Masta Killa
- Released: May 30, 2025
- Recorded: 2024–2025
- Genre: Hip-hop
- Length: 31:10
- Label: Nature Sounds
- Producers: Easy Mo Bee; RZA; DJ FX; Nick Price; PF Cuttin

Masta Killa chronology
| Loyalty Is Royalty (2017) | Balance (2025) | The Godbody LP (2026) |

Singles from Balance
- 1. "Eagle Claw" Released: May 14, 2025

Balance is the fifth studio album by American rapper and Wu-Tang Clan member Masta Killa, released on May 30, 2025, through Nature Sounds. The album features guest appearances from Wu-Tang Clan members Raekwon, Cappadonna, RZA and Method Man, alongside other artists such as Snoop Dogg, N.O.R.E., AZ and Uncle Murda. Produced primarily by Easy Mo Bee, RZA, Nick Price, PF Cuttin and DJ FX. Balance is noted for its classic New York hip-hop sound and boom bap production. The album received generally positive reviews, with critics praising its nostalgic feel and cohesive collaborations, though some noted its uneven track selection.

== Background ==
Balance marks Masta Killa's fifth solo studio album, following an eight-year gap since his previous release, Loyalty Is Royalty (2017). The album was released through Nature Sounds, a label known for its work with Wu-Tang affiliates.

During an interview , Masta Killa discussed the album's creation, emphasizing his intent to craft a project that reflects the classic New York hip-hop sound while incorporating diverse collaborations. Critics have noted the album's nostalgic boom bap production, with tracks like "Building With The Abbott" highlighting RZA's influence as both a producer and featured artist.

Reviews from outlets like RapReviews and UndergroundHipHopBlog praised Balance for its cohesive sound and strong performances, though some critiques pointed to uneven track selection and less impactful collaborations.

== Track listing ==
Balance track listing
| No. | Title | Writer(s) | Producer(s) | Length |
|---|---|---|---|---|
| 1. | "Hip Hop Forever" | Jamel Irief; Osten S. Harvey, Jr. | Easy Mo Bee | 4:08 |
| 2. | "Eagle Claw" (with Raekwon and Cappadonna) | Irief; Corey Woods; Darryl Hill; Nick Price | Nick Price | 2:50 |
| 3. | "BK Harlem" (featuring Head I.C.E) | Irief; Anthony Haney; Price | Nick Price | 2:34 |
| 4. | "Building With The Abbott" (featuring RZA) | Irief; Robert Fitzgerald Diggs | RZA | 2:15 |
| 5. | "City" (featuring Jamall Ray) | Irief; Jamall Ray; Price | Nick Price | 3:18 |
| 6. | "Glad To Meet You" (with Method Man and Snoop Dogg) | Irief; Clifford Smith, Jr.; Calvin Cordozar Broadus, Jr.; Price | Nick Price | 3:39 |
| 7. | "It's Been A Long Time" | Irief; Price | Nick Price | 4:14 |
| 8. | "Trumpets" (featuring N.O.R.E., AZ and Uncle Murda) | Irief; Victor James Santiago, Jr.; Anthony Cruz; Leonard Carl Grant; Harvey, Jr. | Easy Mo Bee | 3:29 |
| 9. | "King Custom" | Irief; Felix Rovira | PF Cuttin' | 1:10 |
| 10. | "Again" (featuring AB Money and Big Bub) | Irief; Anthony Mosley; Frederick Lee Drakeford; Kerris Karzons | DJ FX | 3:33 |
| Total length: | | | | 31:10 |
