= Mediate Souls =

Mediate Souls, also known as Mediate Soul, is a Swiss producing duo, composed of Toni Falzetta and Christoph Wasser. The duo's genre include hip hop and soul. Mediate Souls was established in 2001 in Aarau, Switzerland.

The duo has worked with various Swiss artists and the American rappers Afu-Ra, Main Flow and Masta Killa of the Wu-Tang Clan. The duo produced the track Soul & Substance on Masta Killa's third studio album (Selling My Soul).
