= Selling My Soul =

Studio album by Masta Killa
- Released: December 11, 2012
- Genre: Hip-hop
- Length: 39:08
- Labels: Royal Lion; Nature Sounds
- Producers: 9th Wonder; Allah Mathematics; Blackinati; Dash; Inspectah Deck; Koolade; Masta Killa; Mediate Souls; P.F. Cuttin'

Masta Killa chronology
Made in Brooklyn (2006)	Selling My Soul (2012)	Loyalty Is Royalty (2017)

Wu-Tang Clan solo chronology
The Pilgrimage (2012)	Selling My Soul (2012)	Eyrth, Wynd and Fyre (2013)

Professional ratings
Aggregate scores
Source	Rating
Metacritic	62/100
Review scores
Source	Rating
AllMusic	3.5/5 stars
HipHopDX	3/5
Laut.de	3/5 stars
Pitchfork	5.2/10
Prefix	7.5/10
RapReviews	2.5/10
Slant	3/5 stars
Under the Radar	4.5/10 stars

Selling My Soul is the third solo studio album by American rapper Masta Killa. It was released on December 11, 2012 via Nature Sounds. Production was handled by Allah Mathematics, 9th Wonder, Blackinati, Dash, Inspectah Deck, Koolade, Mediate Souls, P.F. Cuttin', and Masta Killa himself, who also served as executive producer. It features guest appearances from Kurupt and Ol' Dirty Bastard.

== Background ==
When asked about the album's direction, he stated:

Loyalty Is Royalty is more feature-oriented…it's the kind of material that my fans normally expect me to produce. The people will still get Loyalty Is Royalty. I just felt the need to give them some soul first.

== Track listing ==
No.	Title	Writer(s)	Producer(s)	Length
1.	"Skit"	Jamel Irief		0:49
2.	"Intro"	Wu-Tang Clan	Allah Mathematics	1:41
3.	"Soul & Substance"	Irief	Mediate Souls	2:47
4.	"R U Listening"	Irief	Inspectah Deck	2:57
5.	"Things Just Ain't the Same"	Irief	P.F. Cuttin'	3:19
6.	"Part 2"	Irief		1:25
7.	"Cali Sun" (featuring Kurupt)	Irief; Ricardo Brown; Dražen Kvočić	Dash	2:31
8.	"What U See"	Irief; Matko Šašek	Koolade	2:17
9.	"Food"	Irief	9th Wonder	3:23
10.	"Skit"	Irief		0:58
11.	"All Natural"	Irief	Allah Mathematics	2:38
12.	"Wise Words"	Irief	Masta Killa	3:34
13.	"Divine Glory"	Irief	Masta Killa	2:33
14.	"Skit"	Irief		0:26
15.	"Dirty Soul (Ol' Dirty Bastard Tribute)" (featuring Ol' Dirty Bastard)	Irief; Russell Jones	Blackinati	4:57
16.	"Wisdom"		Allah Mathematics	2:53
Total length:				39:08

Notes

- Track 16 is omitted from clean and digital editions of the album.

== Personnel ==
- Elgin "Masta Killa" Turner – vocals, producer (tracks: 12, 13), arranger, mixing, executive producer
- Ricardo "Kurupt" Brown – vocals (track 7)
- Russell "Ol' Dirty Bastard" Jones – vocals (track 15)
- Ronald "Mathematics" Bean – producer (tracks: 2, 11, 16)
- Toni Falzetta – producer (track 3)
- Christoph Wasser – producer (track 3)
- Jason "Inspectah Deck" Hunter – producer (track 4)
- Felix "P.F. Cuttin'" Rovira – producer (track 5), arranger, mixing
- Dražen "Dash" Kvočić – producer (track 7)
- Matko "Koolade" Šašek – producer (track 8)
- Patrick "9th Wonder" Douthit – producer (track 9)
- Blackinati – producer (track 15)
- Devin Horwitz – executive producer
- Matt Wyatt – design
- Chad Griffith – photography
