= Loyalty Is Royalty =

Studio album by Masta Killa
- Released: September 29, 2017
- Recorded: 2017
- Genre: Hip-hop
- Length: 43:27
- Label: Nature Sounds
- Producers: 9th Wonder; Blocade; Chainsaw, Cruz; Dame Grease; !llmind; Masta Killa; P.F. Cuttin'; RZA; True Master

Masta Killa chronology
Selling My Soul (2012)	Loyalty Is Royalty (2017)	Balance (2025)

Wu-Tang Clan solo chronology
The Wild (2017)	Loyalty Is Royalty (2017)	Venom (2018)

Professional ratings
Review scores
Source	Rating
HipHopDX	3.8/5

Loyalty Is Royalty is the fourth studio album by American rapper and Wu-Tang Clan member Masta Killa. It was released on September 29, 2017, on Nature Sounds.

== Critical reception ==
HipHopDX wrote that Masta Killa "may not be the most animated in the Wu, but he arguably holds a place near the first spot if you want to rank the Wu champions of solo album consistency."

== Track listing ==
Loyalty Is Royalty track listing
No.	Title	Writer(s)	Producer(s)	Length
1.	"Intro"	Jamel Irief	Ming-Hsueh Lin	0:51
2.	"Return of the Masta Kill" (featuring Cappadonna and Young Dudas)	Irief; Daryl Hill; Felix Rovira	P.F. Cuttin'	3:21
3.	"Loyalty Is Royalty (R.I.F. - Rapping Is Fundamental)" (featuring Aaron "A.B." Abernathy)	Irief; Aaron Abernathy; Patrick Denard Douthit	9th Wonder	2:37
4.	"Therapy" (featuring Method Man & Redman)	Irief; Clifford Smith, Jr.; Reginald Noble; Rovira	P.F. Cuttin'	3:05
5.	"OGs Told Me" (featuring Boy Backs and Moe Roc)	Irief; Maurice Clayton	Dame Grease	3:30
6.	"Wise Words by the RZA" (featuring RZA)	Robert Fitzgerald Diggs	RZA	1:38
7.	"Trouble"	Irief; Douthit	9th Wonder	2:38
8.	"Skit"	Irief	True Master	0:55
9.	"Down with Me" (featuring Sean Price)	Irief; Sean Duval Price; Douthit	9th Wonder	3:46
10.	"Tiger and the Mantice" (featuring GZA and Inspectah Deck)	Irief; Gary Eldridge Grice; Jason Richard Hunter	Blocade	2:41
11.	"Real People" (featuring Prodigy and KXNG CROOKED)	Irief; Albert Johnson; Dominick Antron Wickliffe	Chainsaw	2:52
12.	"Flex with Me" (featuring Chanel Sosa)	Irief	Masta Killa; P.F. Cuttin'	3:25
13.	"Calculated" (featuring Ra Stacks and Nick Guns)	Irief	Weirdo31654	4:42
14.	"Noodles, Pt. 1"	Irief	!llmind	3:28
15.	"Noodles, Pt. 2"	Irief	Masta Killa	2:11
16.	"Outro"	Irief	Ming-Hsueh Lin	1:47
Total length:				43:27
