= Raysut =

- Town
- Location in Oman
- Coordinates: 16°56′3″N 53°59′33″E
- Country: Oman
- Governorate: Dhofar Governorate
- Time zone: UTC+4 (+4)

Raysut (Arabic: ريسوت, romanized: Raysūt) is a port town in southwestern Oman. It is located in the Dhofar Governorate.

== History ==
In 1908, J.G. Lorimer recorded Rakhyut in his Gazetteer of the Persian Gulf, noting its location as being at the western extremity of Dhofar proper. He wrote:

A bay facing the east with a promontory of the same name on the south side of it. The bay is about 1 mile broad by half a mile deep. and is divided from the plain of Dhufar Proper by some hundred yards of low sea cliff. The promontory is 200 feet high and 1 mile broad at its base; it is covered with traces of human occupation, including a cemetery, 3 acres in extent.

In the bay stands a mud-built bazaar of 15 or 20 shops, constructed by the Wali of Dhufar and permanently occupied by Dhufar traders. In the trading season, between March and September, the number of shops increases to 40 or 50. A guard of 10 or 15 'askaris is always posted here. A torrent bed reaches the bay through a small lagoon; 1½ miles up this ravine is a fresh water spring. Boats from Sur and Muscat town call here, but none belong to the place. There are 300 cattle and 200 sheep and goats.

== Climate ==
Climate data for Raysut (1991-2009)
Month	Jan	Feb	Mar	Apr	May	Jun	Jul	Aug	Sep	Oct	Nov	Dec	Year
Mean daily maximum °C (°F)	26.9 (80.4)	27.4 (81.3)	29.0 (84.2)	30.0 (86.0)	31.1 (88.0)	30.1 (86.2)	26.8 (80.2)	26.5 (79.7)	27.5 (81.5)	29.5 (85.1)	30.0 (86.0)	28.4 (83.1)	28.6 (83.5)
Mean daily minimum °C (°F)	19.9 (67.8)	20.5 (68.9)	21.9 (71.4)	24.8 (76.6)	26.8 (80.2)	26.8 (80.2)	23.9 (75.0)	23.1 (73.6)	23.8 (74.8)	22.9 (73.2)	22.6 (72.7)	21.5 (70.7)	23.2 (73.8)
Average precipitation mm (inches)	1.1 (0.04)	0.1 (0.00)	5.8 (0.23)	2.1 (0.08)	12.9 (0.51)	4.8 (0.19)	24.3 (0.96)	21.9 (0.86)	16.6 (0.65)	6.4 (0.25)	1.9 (0.07)	1.5 (0.06)	99.4 (3.91)
Source: World Meteorological Organization (temperature and rainfall 1991–2009)
