= Trite (disambiguation) =

Trite is a genus of jumping spiders.

Trite may also refer to:

- Trite (coin), a historical currency used in Ancient Lydia
- "Trite", a song by Sage Francis from Sick of Waiting Tables (2001)
- Peter Trites (1946–2010), Canadian teacher and politician
- Roberta Seelinger Trites (born 1962), American professor English Literature

== See also ==
- Cliché
