= Wu-Elements =

American music production team

- Origin: New York City, New York, United States
- Genres: Hip hop
- Years active: 1994–present
- Members: The RZA; 4th Disciple; True Master; Mathematics; Bronze Nazareth; Cilvaringz
- Past members: Carlos 'C-12' Bess; Goldfinghaz; Moongod Allah; Y-Kim the Illfigure

The Wu-Elements are a production team closely affiliated with the Wu-Tang Clan. A loosely knit group, it consists of five producers who typically support main producer RZA in handling production duties for Wu-Tang group, solo and affiliate releases.

== Conception (1994–1997) ==
In 1994, producer 4th Disciple became the first producer outside of RZA to produce on a Wu-Tang Clan release; he co-produced "Sub Crazy" for Method Man's debut Tical, then co-produced the song "Damage" for Ol' Dirty Bastard's solo debut Return to the 36 Chambers: The Dirty Version. True Master also co-produced a song on The Dirty Version, the single "Brooklyn Zoo" with ODB. Also in 1995, 4th Disciple produced the track "B.I.B.L.E.", a Killah Priest solo song at the end of GZA's second album Liquid Swords; he also produced singles for Wu-Tang affiliates Sunz of Man, "Five Arch Angels" and "Soldiers of Darkness." In 1996, True Master produced "Fish", the only non-RZA produced song on Ghostface Killah's debut album Ironman. After both of them contributed to The Pick, the Sickle and the Shovel, a release by RZA's sidegroup The Gravediggaz, they were given production spots on Wu-Tang Clan's second solo album Wu-Tang Forever, in 1997.

== Wu-Tang Clan Affiliate Projects (1998–2002) ==
After 1997, RZA's five-year business plan was up and the members of the Wu-Tang Clan were given their contracts, and they went separate ways to develop their solo careers, during which time many Wu-Tang-affiliated acts began to come out with their own projects. Disciple and True Master were in higher demand as RZA was increasingly less available to produce. In 1998 alone, 4th Disciple and True Master produced much of Sunz of Mans' debut album The Last Shall Be First, Cappadonna's debut The Pillage, Method Man's second album Tical 2000: Judgement Day, and Killah Priest's debut Heavy Mental. In addition, 4th Disciple produced four songs on La the Darkman's debut Heist of the Century and nearly all of affiliate group Killarmy's debut album, Silent Weapons For Quiet Wars. Dirty Weaponry, the Wu-Tang Clan's DJ Allah Mathematics got major placements for his production, previously having produced only B-sides for Ghostface Killah and Cappadonna.

Several of these albums have become cult classics, but their releases have typically been overshadowed by the fans' steady desire to hear RZA production on Wu-Tang projects. The pure volume of Wu-Tang-affiliated material and side projects began to tire critics, and a lack of focus was commonly attributed to the music. In 1999, Disciple took something of a break, producing only two songs for Inspectah Deck's debut album Uncontrolled Substance. True Master took on the bulk of Wu-Element production duties for the year, contributing tracks to U-God's solo debut Golden Arms Redemption and Ol' Dirty Bastard's sophomore effort, Nigga Please; Mathematics produced songs for Uncontrolled Substance as well as GZA's second album, Beneath the Surface, Method Man's collaboration with fellow Def Jam Records rapper Redman entitled Blackout!, a Wu-Tang Clan contribution to Ice Cube's Next Friday soundtrack, and an underground RZA-executive-produced project called Wu-Syndicate by duo Mayalanski and Joe Mafia.

The Wu-Elements' responsibilities increased dramatically by 2000; they were mostly limited to Wu-Tang contributions to soundtracks, and tracks for Ghostface Killah's second album Supreme Clientele and Wu-Tang's third group album, The W. Between the three of them, the Wu-Elements mainly produced a small selection of songs for RZA's sophomore solo album Digital Bullet and Wu-Tang's fourth album Iron Flag in 2001, and in 2002 branched out to one or two outside artists, if that. In 2002, a producer called Moongod Allah was inducted into the Wu-Elements by RZA; however, familial difficulties drew his focus away from the music business.

== Bronze Nazareth and separate projects (2003–2005) ==
2003 brought the induction of producer Bronze Nazareth into the Wu-Elements by RZA. Along with True Master, Nazareth produced for Birth of a Prince, RZA's first album not released under the name Bobby Digital. Now working on releases independently of each other, the members of the Wu-Elements did beats for different artists, mainly under the Wu umbrella. From 2003 to 2005, 4th Disciple produced for Killarmy's 9th Prince, Sunz of Man, and U-God; True Master for 9th Prince, Busta Rhymes, Masta Killa's solo debut No Said Date, Ghostface's Pretty Toney Album, and former Bad Boy Entertainment artist Black Rob; Mathematics for Masta Killa and for the compilation album Wu-Tang Meets the Indie Culture, among other, low-profile projects; and Bronze Nazareth contributed to Wu-Tang Meets the Indie Culture as well as the single release of the Killah Priest-inclusive group Black Market Militia. 2003 also saw Mathematics release his debut album, Love, Hell or Right (Da Come Up), followed in 2005 by The Problem, both featuring heavy appearances from affiliates and core Wu-Tang Clan members.

== RZA's return (2006-present) ==
Starting in 2005 and 2006, RZA was increasingly involved in Wu-Tang production once again. High-profile releases such as Method Man's 2006 album 4:21... The Day After, Cilvaringz' I, GZA's sixth album Pro Tools, the fifth Wu-Tang Clan group album 8 Diagrams, and Raekwon's highly anticipated Only Built 4 Cuban Linx… Pt. II all sported Wu-Element production, but most were spearheaded sonically by RZA, while the individual Elements produced on the side for affiliates such as Killah Priest, Hell Razah, and The Wisemen. Of the currently announced projects coming up from the Wu-Tang camp, RZA has been tapped to produce the entirety of U-God's next album. Ghostface Killah, Raekwon and Method Man's collaboration album Wu-Massacre features production by Mathematics (the lead single, "Meth vs. Chef pt. 2") and RZA (the second single, "Our Dreams").

RZA has confirmed he will be handling all the production for GZA's sequel album Liquid Swords II: The Return Of The Shadowboxer. Other upcoming projects slated for RZA production involvement include: Ghostface Killah's Supreme Clientele Presents - Blue & Cream: The Wally Era, and Raekwon's eventual Only Built 4 Cuban Linx... Part III. Method Man is also trying to get RZA involved in his final album, Crystal Meth, and Inspectah Deck is looking forward to some RZA production for his upcoming album, Uncontrolled Substance 2, as well. It is unknown if Cappadonna will feature RZA's production on The Pillage 2, or if Masta Killa used any of his production for his still-unreleased Loyalty is Royalty feature-rich album. Most of these albums are most likely to be the last few released from most of the Wu-Tang Clan members. RZA will most likely close out the Wu-Tang dynasty and legacy with production on these albums, marking a precursor to the $5 million double-disc closing chapter album, The Wu: Once Upon a Time in Shaolin.
