= Iron Flag =

Studio album by Wu-Tang Clan
- Released: December 18, 2001
- Recorded: January – November 2001
- Studios: 36 Chambers (New York); The Hit Factory (New York); Sony Music (New York)
- Genres: Hip-hop; alternative hip hop; conscious hip-hop
- Length: 55:21
- Labels: Loud; Columbia
- Producers: RZA; Mathematics; Nick Fury; True Master; The Trackmasters

Wu-Tang Clan chronology
The W (2000)	Iron Flag (2001)	8 Diagrams (2007)

Iron Flag (titled as Wu-Tang Iron Flag on streaming platforms) is the fourth studio album by American hip-hop collective Wu-Tang Clan, released on December 18, 2001 by Loud Records and Columbia Records. It was certified gold in sales by the RIAA. Iron Flag served as the group's second lowest-selling album (687,000 copies), as their record label, Loud, was on the verge of shutting down at the time. The album debuted at No. 32 on the Billboard 200 with 153,000 copies sold in its first week of release. It has sold over half a million copies in the United States and certified Gold by the RIAA. Rapper Ol' Dirty Bastard is completely absent from the album.

== Background ==
A gap of four years separated both the first and second albums; and three years between the second and third albums; with those gaps being filled by a myriad of solo projects. The Clan reformed for a new LP one year after their well-received 2000 album The W, with RZA's Digital Bullet and Ghostface Killah's Bulletproof Wallets released in between. The album's promotion was also quite low-key, particularly in comparison to the fanfare, hype and expensive videos that had preceded the release of the group's two previous albums. Unusual for hip-hop albums of the time, Iron Flag only consists of 12 tracks (which contain 13 songs plus a short introduction) with no interludes or skits between songs. This is similar to The W, which only consisted of 13 tracks (though unlike Iron Flag it did feature interludes and skits).

== Artwork ==
The album cover is inspired by the 1945 photograph Raising the Flag on Iwo Jima.

== Absences ==
Ol' Dirty Bastard's contributions to the Wu-Tang's group albums continued to decrease with each successive album: after being one of the main stars of Enter the Wu-Tang (36 Chambers), he was by far the least prolific Clan member on the group's follow-up album Wu-Tang Forever. He then made only one appearance on The W (on the song "Conditioner") due to being engulfed in legal troubles; which in the year separating The W and Iron Flag had only gotten worse. Consequently, Ol' Dirty Bastard does not appear on Iron Flag at all, making The W the final Wu-Tang album to feature him. He does, however, appear on 8 Diagrams posthumously.

Another absentee is Cappadonna who, after being a close affiliate of the group on Wu-Tang Forever, appeared to have become a full member on The W (tracks with his contributions no longer being marked as "featuring Cappadonna"). In the year following the release of The W, Cappadonna had become dissatisfied with being in the group (RZA has said he felt unhappy that people outside of the group did not respect him as much as the original nine members) and had also been in dispute with the group over the revelation that his manager Michael Caruso was a police informant. Whatever the case, he only appears once on the album in a bridge for the hidden song, "Da Glock". He appears on the original cover of the album but was air brushed out. The original cover appears on the back of the "Wu-Tang Manual" by RZA. This suggests that he might have been removed from the album in post production.

== Revisiting old sounds ==
Rather than stick to one unified sound for most of the album's tracks, as with previous Clan albums, much of Iron Flag returns to multiple different individual sounds and styles that the Wu-Tang had visited over the years:

- "Chrome Wheels" uses the synthesizer-heavy "digital orchestra" sound of RZA's Bobby Digital In Stereo (RZA also raps in the song as his Bobby Digital persona, and Bobby Digital is name checked in the bridge (sung by Madame D). "Dashing (Reasons)" also uses the Bobby Digital sound, with the Digital trademarks of the off-kilter keyboard riff, a high-pitched portamento sine wave synthesizer, and prominent synthesized hi-hats.
- "Radioactive (Four Assassins)" is firmly in the gritty, foreboding style of the Wu-Tang's debut album Enter the Wu-Tang (36 Chambers): it has a recurring dialogue sample from a martial arts movie, short and indistinct one-note samples buried in the mix, a quickly looping ascending bassline, and hard, pounding drums. The beat also incorporates the sound of shuriken throwing blades, which are "launched" with a single B note, before the sound effect pans from right to left then back again before dissipating. The repeated horn blare at the start of every bar is also reminiscent of Public Enemy, particularly "Night of the Living Baseheads."
- "Iron Flag" has all the hallmarks of the Wu-Tang Forever sound: string samples coupled with subtle keyboards and a sped-up vocal sample (a technique which was pioneered by the RZA on Wu-Tang Forever but which by the time of Iron Flag's release had been widely imitated by many, most notably Just Blaze and Kanye West).
- "Uzi (Pinky Ring)" recalls The W's murky blaxploitation-influenced atmosphere with its dramatic horn riffs and gritty drums. "Soul Power (Black Jungle)" is also reminiscent, albeit to a lesser extent, of The W.

== Wu-Elements contributions ==
Many of the remaining tracks sound little like much the Clan had done before, and little like each other. This may be a result of the collaborators involved: all of the above tracks are produced by the RZA, whereas of the remaining six, only two are RZA produced. Two are produced by in-house Wu-Elements producers True Master and Mathematics:

- True Master's "Y'all Been Warned" is a simple one-bar composition with a funky guitar riff over a steady rhythm and a deeply buried piano sample. The advance copy of Iron Flag featured a slightly different version of this song which featured a synthesizer line over the top of the guitar riff. It is not known why this was changed for the final release.
- Mathematics' "Rules" features a pattern of one bar repeated three times then a one-bar turnaround. The repeated bar features four samples layered in a vaguely call-and-response structure: an initial horn sample is answered by a James Brown grunt, which is answered by a two-chord piano sample, which is answered by another James Brown grunt. The horn sample is highest in the mix and effectively "leads" the other samples. The turnaround bar has two descending chords with a high-pitched picked guitar riff, bringing the four-bar pattern to the start once again. With its intro of scratched samples of various Wu-Tang lyrics, this track can be viewed as reminiscent of hip-hop producer DJ Premier's distinctive style.

Though these two producers are known for their distinctly traditional Wu-Tang sound, these two beats do not particularly resemble much of the Clan's previous output, at least not as a group. If anything, they resemble some of the sharp 1970s soul-influenced funk tracks from the Wu-Tang's 1999–2000 solo albums (U-God's "Dat Gangsta" and "Soul Dazzle" from Golden Arms Redemption, Inspectah Deck's "Word on the Street" and "Movers and Shakers" from Uncontrolled Substance).

== Outside collaborators ==
There had been some discontent among fans and critics when The W included non-Wu Tang affiliated hip-hop crossover superstars Busta Rhymes and Snoop Dogg. Nevertheless, Iron Flag also makes use of non-Wu artists well known in their own right: Flavor Flav of Public Enemy provides the chorus for "Soul Power (Black Jungle)", and "Back in the Game" features both pop-rap hitmakers Trackmasters and soul legend Ronald Isley. Nick "Fury" Loftin also produces "One of These Days", sampling Donny Hathaway's rendition of Ray Charles' "I Believe to My Soul" for its hook and using a fairly generic coupling of muffled horn stabs and soul guitar.

"Back in the Game" opens with the same vocal sample ("if what you say is true, the Shaolin and the Wu-Tang could be dangerous!") as 36 Chambers, but it sounds little like anything the Clan had done before; it also sounds little like well-known Trackmasters hits of the time, such as R. Kelly's "Fiesta" (apart from its use of bongos). A delicate piano melody is layered over a heavy organ vamp and a stumbling, complex rhythm.

A number of critics, such as the NME's Ted Kessler and The A.V. Club's Nathan Rabin, saw Flavor Flav's appearance as a way to temporarily fill the clownish role of the absent Ol' Dirty Bastard. Flav sings the call-and-response chorus of "Soul Power (Black Jungle)" with U-God, and has a long conversation with Method Man in the song's outro about growing up in Long Island, where Flav hails from.

Professional ratings
Aggregate scores
Source	Rating
Metacritic	69/100
Review scores
Source	Rating
AllMusic	4/5 stars
Blender	4/5 stars
Entertainment Weekly	B+
HipHopDX	4/5 stars
Mojo	4/5 stars
Pitchfork	7.5/10
Q	2/5 stars
Rolling Stone	3.5/5 stars
The Rolling Stone Album Guide	4/5 stars
Stylus	A−

== Track listing ==
Credits were adapted from the official liner notes and Tidal.

Iron Flag track listing
No.	Title	Writer(s)	Producer(s)	Length
1.	"In the Hood"	Robert Fitzgerald Diggs; Jason Richard Hunter; Jamel Irief; Patrick Charles	RZA	4:10
2.	"Rules"	Corey Woods; Clifford Smith, Jr.; Dennis David Coles; Hunter; Jamel Irief; P. Charles; Ronald Maurice Bean	Mathematics	3:53
3.	"Chrome Wheels"	Woods; Diggs; Odion Turner; Lamar Ruff	RZA	4:14
4.	"Soul Power (Black Jungle)" (featuring Flavor Flav)	Coles; Woods; Smith, Jr.; Diggs; Irief; Lamont Jody Hawkins	RZA	4:52
5.	"Uzi (Pinky Ring)"	Coles; Russel Tyrone Jones; Woods; Smith, Jr.; Diggs; Gary Eldridge Grice; Hunter; Irief; Hawkins; Clarence Henry Reid	RZA	5:20
6.	"One of These Days"	Woods; Hunter; Hawkins; Nicholas Loftin; Ray Charles Robinson Sr.	Nick Fury	4:13
7.	"Ya'll Been Warned"	Woods; Smith, Jr.; Diggs; Hunter; Irief; P. Charles; Derrick Harris	True Master	4:15
8.	"Babies"	Coles; Woods; Diggs; Grice; Hunter	RZA	5:08
9.	"Radioactive (Four Assassins)"	Woods; Smith, Jr.; Diggs; Grice; Irief	RZA	3:30
10.	"Back in the Game" (featuring Ronald Isley)	Coles; Woods; Smith, Jr.; Grice; Hunter; Jean-Claude Olivier; Samuel Barnes	Trackmasters	4:34
11.	"Iron Flag/Da Glock"	Woods; Diggs; Hunter; Irief; Hawkins	RZA	3:13
12.	"Dashing (Reasons)"	Diggs; Grice; Hunter	RZA	4:44
Total length:				55:18

Iron Flag bonus track
No.	Title	Writer(s)	Producer(s)	Length
13.	"The W"	Woods; Smith, Jr.; Diggs; Grice; Hawkins	RZA	3:41
Total length:				58:59

Notes

- "Chrome Wheels" and "Babies" feature background vocals by Madame D.
- "One of These Days" features additional guitars by E-Bass.
- "Babies" features drums by Ramsey Jones.
- "In the Hood", "Rules", "One of These Days" and "Ya'll Been Warned" feature uncredited raps by Streetlife.
- "Chrome Wheels" features uncredited raps by 12 O'Clock and Prodigal Sunn as Two On Da Road.
- "Da Glock" contains uncredited background vocals by Cappadonna.
- "In the Hood" contains uncredited vocals by Suga Bang Bang.
- "In the Hood" contains a sample from the 1979 film Writing Kung Fu.
- "Iron Flag" and "Da Glock" are available as separate tracks on streaming services.

== Album singles ==
Single information
"Uzi (Pinky Ring)"
- Released: December 18, 2001
- B-side: "Y'all Been Warned"
"Rules"
- Released: January 22, 2002
- B-side: "In the Hood"
"Back in the Game"
- Released: April 23, 2002

== Charts ==
=== Weekly charts ===
Weekly chart performance for Iron Flag
Chart (2001–2002)	Peak position
Australian Albums (ARIA)	46
Austrian Albums (Ö3 Austria)	36
Dutch Albums (Album Top 100)	57
French Albums (SNEP)	61
German Albums (Offizielle Top 100)	44
Swiss Albums (Schweizer Hitparade)	39
UK Albums (Official Charts)	77
US Billboard 200	32
US Top R&B/Hip-Hop Albums (Billboard)	6

=== Year-end charts ===
Year-end chart performance for Iron Flag
Chart (2002)	Position
Canadian R&B Albums (Nielsen SoundScan)	111
Canadian Rap Albums (Nielsen SoundScan)	61

== Singles chart positions ==
Year	Song	Chart positions		
Year	Song	Billboard Hot 100	Hot R&B/Hip-Hop Singles & Tracks	Hot Rap Singles
2002	"Uzi (Pinky Ring)"	–	93	16

== Certifications ==
Certifications for Iron Flag
Region	Certification	Certified units/sales
United States (RIAA)	Gold	500,000^{^}
^{^} Shipments figures based on certification alone.
