= Arabian Knight (music producer) =

- Birth name: Suleyman Ansari
- Also known as: Q-Base
- Genres: Hip hop
- Occupations: Record producer; mixing engineer; recording engineer
- Years active: 1998–2011
- Labels: Wu-Tang Records; MCA

Suleyman Ansari, professionally known as the Arabian Knight and Q-Base, is a hip hop producer affiliated with the Wu-Tang Clan. He has produced tracks for GZA, Royal Fam, Killah Priest, Krumbsnatcha, Inspectah Deck, Afu-Ra, Craig G, Kreators, and DJ Deadeye. His most successful project was GZA's third solo studio album, Beneath the Surface, in which Ansari produced 5 songs and also served as co-executive producer.

== Production discography ==
Year	Artist	Title	Album	Notes
1998	Killah Priest	"High Explosives"	Heavy Mental	
1999	GZA	"Breaker, Breaker"	Beneath the Surface	Hot R&B/Hip-Hop Songs: #80; Hot Rap Songs: #16
1999	GZA	"Hip Hop Fury" (featuring RZA, Hell Razah, Timbo King & Dreddy Kruger)	Beneath the Surface	
1999	GZA	"Victim" (featuring Joan Davis & Njeri Earth)	Beneath the Surface	
1999	GZA	"Stringplay (Like This, Like That)" (featuring Method Man)	Beneath the Surface	
1999	GZA	"Outro" (featuring La the Darkman & Timbo King)	Beneath the Surface	
2000	Royal Fam	"Fire" (featuring Makeba Mooncycle)	Yesterday, Today, Iz Tomorrow	
2000	Royal Fam	"Acid" (featuring Mighty Jarrett)	Yesterday, Today, Iz Tomorrow	
2000	Royal Fam	"Musical Chairs" (featuring Hell Razah, Prodigal Sunn & Stoneface)	Yesterday, Today, Iz Tomorrow	
2000	Royal Fam	"Our Time" (featuring Dark Denim & C.O.I.N.S.)	Yesterday, Today, Iz Tomorrow	
2000	Killah Priest	"Bop Your Head" (featuring Canibus)	View from Masada	
2002	GZA	"Stay In Line" (featuring Santi White)	Legend of the Liquid Sword	
2002	GZA	"Fame"	Legend of the Liquid Sword	Hot R&B/Hip-Hop Songs: #99; Hot Rap Songs: #19
2002	GZA	"Highway Robbery" (featuring Governor Two's)	Legend of the Liquid Sword	
2002	GZA	"Sparring Minds" (featuring Inspectah Deck)	Legend of the Liquid Sword	
2002	Krumbsnatcha	"Get Down" (featuring Jaysaun)	Respect All Fear None	
2002	Afu-Ra	"Sacred Wars" (featuring Don Parmazhane & The Blob)	Life Force Radio	
2003	Craig G	"Say What Ya Want"	This Is Now!!!	
2003	Inspectah Deck	"It's Like That"	The Movement	
2004	Royal Fam	"Blame Us (Part 1)" (featuring Dark Denim, Mighty Jarrett, Sharecka & Timbo King)	Years Months Dayz	
2004	Kreators	"I Don't Believe That"	Live Coverage	
2004	Krumbsnatcha	"Fall Back" (featuring J-Haze)	11.19 the Rebirth	
2008	GZA	"Short Race" (featuring Roc Marciano)	Pro Tools	
2008	GZA	"Cinema" (featuring Justice Kareem)	Pro Tools	
2011	DJ Deadeye	"Substance Abuse" (featuring Gauge & Termanology)	Substance Abuse	Co-produced w/ DJ Deadeye
