= Pro Tools (album) =

Studio album by GZA/Genius
- Released: August 19, 2008
- Recorded: 2006–2008
- Genre: Hip-hop
- Length: 44:11
- Labels: Liquid Swords; Babygrande
- Producers: RZA; Bronze Nazareth; Preservation; Mathematics; Black Milk; Arabian Knight; True Master

GZA/Genius chronology
Grandmasters (2005)	Pro Tools (2008)	Dark Matter (TBA)

Wu-Tang Clan solo chronology
The Cappatilize Project (2008)	Pro Tools (2008)	Slang Prostitution (2009)

Pro Tools is the fifth studio album by American rapper and Wu-Tang Clan member GZA. The album was released August 19, 2008 on GZA's Liquid Swords Entertainment and Babygrande Records. It serves as his first release since his collaboration album with DJ Muggs, Grandmasters (2005), and follows six years after his last solo effort, Legend of the Liquid Sword (2002). Production for the album took place during 2008 and was handled by several record producers, including RZA, Bronze Nazareth, Preservation, Mathematics, Black Milk, Arabian Knight and True Master.

The album debuted at number 52 on the US Billboard 200 chart, selling 9,000 copies in its first week. Upon its release, Pro Tools received generally positive reviews from most music critics.

== Background ==
The title refers to Pro Tools music production software. In an interview with Vibe, he explained:

Well, it’s the production software program, basically. The people at Babygrande were asking for a name. I was looking around the house, or the studio, and trying to come up with something, and I may have even been reading the actual Pro Tools manual and just went with that, and it works great with the album.

— GZA

Pro Tools features production from Wu-Elements producers RZA, True Master, Mathematics and Bronze Nazareth, as well as Arabian Knight, Dreddy Kruger, Preservation. Guest appearances range from RZA, Masta Killa, and GZA's son Young Justice. GZA later said "I saw an ad out there where it’s promoted as a GZA album. I'll probably be on most of the tracks but its supposed to be a compilation album, there’s various artists on the album".

GZA was asked about producers and having fewer guest appearances on the album, responding "I’m not one who works with big producers because I expect that to make the album go double platinum. I remember once we paid $150,000 for a Trackmasters beat once, with Ron Isley singing, the “Back In The Game” track off of Iron Flag, and it wasn’t even a single, so I don’t bother searching for names. I’d rather people buy the record because they want a GZA album, and then the extras be a surprise. The album as a whole has only two Clan members on it. The last day we were recording, I was in Paris supporting the Wu tour, and a call was put out that I was in the studio and the only two that showed up were RZA & Masta Killa, so that’s what we went with. My next album is going to be no guest appearances. Emcees need to start carrying their own weight". In the same interview, he gave a response about having only a few RZA-produced songs on the album, stating "Well, you have to put in time with your producer, and RZA and I have been working back since I was 11 & he was 8 going to the Bronx to check out this hip-hop stuff, so you have to know where they are coming from. Whenever I close my eyes and listen to his stuff, I can’t put a rhyme to it. His beats are more cinematic".

== Music ==
The first single from the album, "Paper Plate," was released on July 18, 2008, and was circulated widely over the internet. The single continues the feud between GZA and 50 Cent (who has not responded to the track). GZA, during a performance in Queens, New York, had this to say about 50 Cent: "a Nigga don't got fuckin lyrics". In response to a question about "Paper Plate," he said:

You know what “Paper Plate” is about? [A paper plate is] just something that is lightweight and disposable. You can recycle it and get rid of it after you’re done with it. It’s just a statement that I wanted to get out, saying that “I’m lyrical and I’m not material.” I’m a sum of a beautiful equation and sometimes these dudes need to just realize and respect the tradition of an emcee. I’ve been working in this game for a while to try and focus on the lyrical aspect of all this. It’s saying 50 Cent and G Unit could never write like me and I’m coming at it focusing on shelf life. I’m not trying to clown all the younger rappers, but just saying that there is so many things to be inspired by, so I don’t understand why people are still rhyming about the same thing. I’m trying to move forward a tradition, and you can see that when I’m going on a Liquid Swords tour 10 years after it came out. Wu-Tang has two or three generations of fans so we must be relevant. And what does it matter that they callin me grandpa? Cuz I fathered your style?

— GZA

== Reception ==
=== Commercial performance ===
The album debuted at number 52 on the US Billboard 200 chart with first-week sales of 9,000 copies. It spent two weeks on the chart. The album also peaked at number 13 on Billboard's Top R&B/Hip-Hop Albums, at number two on the Top Independent Albums, and at number nine on the Top Rap Albums chart.

=== Critical response ===
Professional ratings
Aggregate scores
Source	Rating
Metacritic	76/100
Review scores
Source	Rating
AllMusic	4/5 stars
The A.V. Club	B+
Boston Herald	A−
HipHopDX	4/5
MSN Music (Consumer Guide)	B+
Pitchfork	6.8/10
PopMatters	6/10
RapReviews	8.5/10
Slant Magazine	3.5/5 stars
Tiny Mix Tapes	3.5/5 stars

Pro Tools received positive reviews from most music critics, based on an aggregate score of 76/100 from Metacritic. AllMusic writer David Jeffries gave it 4 out of 5 stars and viewed it as reappearance of the Wu-Tang Clan's early sound, stating "the uptempo and sometimes oddball rhymes are back in full force here and sit on a set of melancholy soul productions that have that classic Wu atmosphere". Billboard's Jeff Vrabel called GZA's rhymes "liquid" and wrote "it's worth a listen to hear what sneaky, suspicious, image-heavy tricks still emerge from his notebook". Ivan Rott of About.com commended GZA's abstract lyrics and the album's musical structure, noting "a distinguishably liquid-like (ahem) sense of continuity and focus throughout the album's duration". JIVE Magazine gave Pro Tools a 5 out of 5 rating and called it "lyrically stunning". Seattle Weekly's Kevin Capp praised GZA's lyricism and wrote that he crafts "earthquake-proof rhyme structures, steel hulks whose ornate décor distracts from their essential solidity. In short: the aesthetics mask the utility, as well they should". RapReviews writer Steve Juon gave it an 8.5/10 rating and wrote that GZA "honed his lyrical tongue to an even sharper and more polished edge" on the album. Boston Herald writer Chris Faraone gave Pro Tools an A− rating and wrote that GZA "comes as close as he ever has to matching freshman miracle" Liquid Swords (1995).

In contrast, Spin's Thomas Golianopoulos gave the album 2 out of 5 stars and wrote that GZA "drifts into irrelevant lyrics and weak beats", stating "These C-grade tracks ape RZA's trademark sound, but lack any sense of melody". Addi Stewart of NOW commended its "Shogun Assassin throat-slashing rap", but viewed its production as a weakness and wrote that the album "suffers from the law of diminishing returns". Giving it a 6/10 rating, PopMatters writer Anthony Henriques perceived a lack of presence by other Wu-Tang members "to complement and add contrast to GZA’s potent style" as its "largest flaw", but ultimately commended its production and called it "just as impressive" lyrically as Liquid Swords. Henriques described Pro Tools as a "quality project" and called it "further proof" that "Those who continue to lament some apparent demise of the Wu-Tang Clan ... need to wake up". Despite calling its production "a glaring weak point of the album", Sputnikmusic writer Sobhi Abdul-Rakhman gave it 3½ out of 5 stars and commended individual producers' contributions, while writing "GZA-science is always refreshing and reflective". Pitchfork Media's Nate Patrin gave Pro Tools a 6.8/10 rating and noted a lack of "stylistic cohesion" in its production, but ultimately lauded GZA's lyrics and viewed them as the album's key strength, stating:

As a pure lyrical record goes, Pro Tools doesn't disappoint, but fans who want everything to be a banger will be let down to find that there's not a lot of headknock here. The buzz around Pro Tools is that GZA just sounds too tired to get people amped, and while that's a more negative assessment than he deserves, this still doesn't really sound like the kind of album you'd call on to fill anyone's late-summer barbecue party soundtracking duties. But high-energy anthems aren't what made GZA great in the first place, and if you're into his most characteristic attributes—high-concept extended-metaphor lyrics, hard-boiled storytelling, that calmly authoritative voice—Pro Tools is still sharp enough to draw blood.

— Nate Patrin

Micah Towery of Slant Magazine wrote that it "serves as a satisfying example of a hip-hop artist who has not burnt out or sold out his craft to be an industry kingpin (cough, Jay-Z, cough). At worst, the album serves as the base minimum of what we should expect from any of the "greatest rappers alive" after five albums". Tiny Mix Tapes writer Larry Fitzmaurice gave the album 3½ out of 5 stars and wrote "while its power as a long-player doesn’t hold up very well, random dissection brings out tracks destined for analog and digital freaks alike". Giving it a B+ rating, The A.V. Club's Nathan Rabin called the album "so rich in detail that it takes a few listens just to soak everything in", and commended its sonic sound, stating "GZA relies on production to convey emotion". Alex Baldinger of The Washington Post gave Pro Tools a generally positive review and wrote "The album's fine production carries GZA through several tracks, rather than the other way around. But his rhymes are sharp as ever, displaying his knack for imbuing his lyrics with double-entendres and extended metaphors". In his consumer guide for MSN Music, critic Robert Christgau gave the album a B+ rating, indicating "remarkable one way or another, yet also flirts with the humdrum or the half-assed". Christgau commended GZA's "factual" lyrics and its minimal style of production, stating "the budget production enhances a master lyricist's specialty by subtraction". The Village Voice's Christopher R. Weingarten called the album "a no-nonsense mash of classic Gary Numan breakbeats, swipes at 50 Cent, retro-future noir production, and his inimitable puns".

== Track listing ==
Pro Tools track listing
No.	Title	Writer(s)	Producer(s)	Length
1.	"Intromental"	Gary Eldridge Grice; James Dockery	Dreddy Kruger	0:52
2.	"Pencil" (featuring Masta Killa and RZA)	Grice; Jamel Irief; Robert Fitzgerald Diggs; Ronald Maurice Bean	Mathematics	3:58
3.	"Alphabets"	Grice; Derrick Harris	True Master	2:42
4.	"Groundbreaking" (featuring Justice Kareem)	Grice; Justice Kareem; Justin Dante Cross	Bronze Nazareth	2:32
5.	"7 Pounds"	Grice; Curtis Eugene Cross; Jean Guillaume Daval	Black Milk	2:41
6.	"0% Finance"	Grice; Jose Reynoso; Suleyman Ansari	Arabian Knight, Jose "Choco" Reynoso	4:20
7.	"Short Race" (featuring Roc Marciano)	Grice; Rahkeim Calief Meyer; Ansari	Arabian Knight	4:05
8.	"Interlude"	Grice		0:26
9.	"Paper Plate"	Grice; Harris	True Master	2:48
10.	"Columbian Ties" (featuring True Master)	Grice; Harris; Cross	Bronze Nazareth	2:47
11.	"Firehouse" (featuring Ka)	Grice; Kaseem Ryan; Meyer	Roc Marciano	3:43
12.	"Path of Destruction"	Grice; Jay Garfield	Jay "Waxx" Garfield	2:36
13.	"Cinema" (featuring Justice Kareem)	Grice; Kareem; Ansari	Arabian Knight	2:59
14.	"Intermission (Drive In Movie)"	Grice		0:24
15.	"Life Is a Movie" (featuring RZA and Irfane Khan-Acito)	Grice; Diggs; Irfane Khan-Acito	RZA	3:10
16.	"Elastic Audio (Live)"	Grice	Dreddy Kruger	4:00
Total length:				44:11

== Personnel ==
- Arabian Knight – recording engineer
- Black Milk – producer
- Bronze Nazareth – producer
- Ben Dotson – product manager
- Willy Friedman – product manager
- Jay "Waxx" Garfield – producer
- GZA – executive producer
- Dreddy Kruger – A&R, producer
- Larry Lachmann – mastering

- Mathematics – producer
- Nubian – artwork
- Preservation – producer
- Jose "Choco" Reynoso – mixing, producer
- Rock Marcy – producer
- RZA – producer
- Jesse Stone – marketing
- True Master – producer
- Chuck Wilson – executive producer

== Charts ==
Chart (2008)	Peak position
US Billboard 200	52
US Top Rap Albums (Billboard)	9
US Top R&B/Hip-Hop Albums (Billboard)	13
US Independent Albums (Billboard)	2
