= Life Force Radio =

Studio album by Afu-Ra
- Released: May 21, 2002
- Studio: D&D Studios (New York, NY)
- Genre: Hip hop
- Length: 1:04:09
- Label: Koch
- Producer: DJ Premier (also exec.); Easy Mo Bee; Curt Cazal; Eric S; Domingo; Needlz; Kenny Muhammad the Human Orchestra; Ayatollah; The Arabian Knight; True Master; Woogie; DJ Desue; Eric Steinen

Afu-Ra chronology
Body of the Life Force (2000)	Life Force Radio (2002)	Perverted Monks (2004)

Professional ratings
Review scores
Source	Rating
Allmusic	4/5 stars

Life Force Radio is the second studio album by American rapper Afu-Ra. It was released on May 21, 2002 by Koch Records. The album's audio production was handled by Arabian Knight, Ayatollah, Curt Cazal, Domingo, Easy Mo Bee, Eric S, Kenny Muhammad the Human Orchestra, Needlz, True Master, Woogie, and DJ Premier, who also served as executive producer. It featured guest appearances from Alana Da Fonseca, Big Daddy Kane, Don Parmazhane, Gang Starr, Jahdan Blakkamoore, Kenny Muhammad the Human Orchestra, M.O.P., Quinnes Parker, RZA, Teena Marie, The Blob, and A-Sun & Respect from Perverted Monks.

== Track listing ==
No.	Title	Producer(s)	Length
1.	"Asun/The Message" (featuring A-Sun)	Woogie	1:21
2.	"Scat Man"	Eric S	3:17
3.	"Stick Up" (featuring Big Daddy Kane)	Curt Cazal	3:43
4.	"Hip Hop" (featuring Respect)	Easy Mo Bee	4:07
5.	"Crossfire" (featuring M.O.P.)	Eric S	4:36
6.	"Open" (featuring Teena Marie)	Domingo	4:21
7.	"Lyrical Monster"	DJ Premier	3:49
8.	"Miss You" (featuring Alana Da Fonseca)	Needlz	4:20
9.	"Perverted Monks"	Easy Mo Bee	3:50
10.	"Ghetto City Streets" (Skit)		1:22
11.	"Readjustment" (featuring Q)	Easy Mo Bee	4:19
12.	"1, 2, 3"	Curt Cazal	4:51
13.	"Think Before You..." (featuring Jahdan Blakkamoore)	Ayatollah	4:08
14.	"Aural Fixation" (featuring Kenny Muhammad the Human Orchestra)	Kenny Muhammad the Human Orchestra	4:20
15.	"Sacred Wars" (featuring Don Parmazhane, The Blob)	The Arabian Knight	3:56
16.	"Dangerous Language" (featuring RZA)	True Master	3:53
17.	"Blvd." (featuring Gang Starr)	DJ Premier	3:56
Total length:			1:04:09

Limited Edition bonus tracks
No.	Title	Producer(s)	Length
18.	"Whirlwind 2"	DJ Desue
19.	"Uno Momento" (featuring R.C.A.)	Eric Steinen
20.	"Big Acts Little Acts (Remix)" (featuring GZA)	DJ Premier

== Personnel ==
- Aaron Phillip – main performer
- Antonio Hardy – guest performer (track 3)
- Eric Murray – guest performer (track 5)
- Jamal Grinnage – guest performer (track 5)
- Mary Christine Brockert – guest performer (track 6)
- Wayne Sharne Henry – guest performer (track 13)
- Kenny Muhammad the Human Orchestra – guest performer & producer (track 14)
- Don Parmazhane – guest performer (track 15)
- The B.L.O.B. – guest performer (track 15)
- Robert Fitzgerald Diggs – guest performer (track 16)
- Keith Edward Elam – guest performer (track 17)
- R.C.A. – guest performer (track 19)
- Gary Grice – guest performer (track 20)
- A-Sun a.k.a. Solar Monk – vocals (track 1)
- Russell Ballenger Jr. – additional vocals (track 4)
- Alana Da Fonseca – additional vocals (track 8)
- Quinnes Diamond Parker – additional vocals (track 11)
- David Sechy – bass & piano (track 2)
- Eric S – drums (track 2), producer (tracks: 2, 5)
- Arnold Lloyd Miot – guitar (track 4)
- Frederick Kraai – saxophone (track 6)
- Gavin "Natty Dred" Daly – trombone & trumpet (track 6), autoharp (track 14)
- Joe Quinde – guitar (track 8)
- Doug Grama – bass (track 11)
- Diego Campo – guitar & keyboards (track 13)
- Rory Jackson – bass (track 13)
- Adam Deitch – drums (track 13)
- Woogie – producer (track 1)
- Curtis Andre Small – producer (tracks: 3, 12)
- Osten Harvey Jr. – producer (tracks: 4, 9, 11)
- Domingo Padilla – producer (track 6)
- Christopher Edward Martin – producer (tracks: 7, 17), executive producer
- Khari Cain – producer (track 8)
- Lamont Dorrell – producer (track 13)
- Suleyman Ansari – producer (track 15)
- Derek Harris – producer (track 16)
- Hashim Elobied – producer (track 18)
- Eric Steinen – producer (track 19), mixing (track 1), engineering
- Kieran Walsh – mixing (tracks: 2–6, 8–13, 15–16)
- Norberto Cotto – mixing (tracks: 7, 17)
- Rock – mixing (track 14)
- Dejuana Richardson – engineering
- Dexter Thibou – engineering
- Leo "Swift" Morris – engineering
- Robert Green Brooks – additional engineering (track 6)
- Tony Dawson – mastering
- Jeff Gilligan – art direction & design
- Alex Ostroy – illustration

== Album chart positions ==
Chart (2002)	Peak position
US Billboard 200	184
US Independent Albums (Billboard)	17
US Top R&B/Hip-Hop Albums (Billboard)	29

== Singles chart positions ==
Year	Song	Chart positions		
Year	Song	Billboard Hot 100	Hot R&B/Hip-Hop Singles & Tracks	Hot Rap Singles
2002	"Crossfire"	-	#56	-
