= Pro Tools (disambiguation) =

Pro Tools is a digital multitrack audio software program.

Pro Tools may also refer to:

- Pro Tools (album), an album by GZA
- Pro Tools, an art exhibit by Cory Arcangel
