= Caught Up (soundtrack) =

Caught Up: Music From the Motion Picture

Soundtrack album by Various artists
- Released: February 24, 1998
- Recorded: 1997
- Genres: Hip hop; R&B
- Length: 56:58
- Labels: Noo Trybe; Virgin
- Producers: Eric L. Brooks (exec.); Byron Phillips (exec.); Binky Mack; Bink!; Daz Dillinger; DJ Premier; Jermaine Dupri; Joe; KRS-One; Mark In The Dark; Mike Dean; Rashad Coes; Snoop Dogg; Somethin' for the People; Soopafly; Soulshock and Karlin; The Legendary Traxster; Tone Capone; True Master; Carl So-Lowe (co.); DJ Quik (co.); GuRu (co.)

Professional ratings
Review scores
Source	Rating
AllMusic	3/5 stars

Caught Up: Motion From the Motion Picture is the soundtrack to Darin Scott's 1998 crime film Caught Up. It was released on February 24, 1998 through Virgin Records's Noo Trybe label and consisted entirely of hip hop music. The soundtrack did fairly well on the Billboard charts, making it to #30 on the Billboard 200 and #6 on the Top R&B/Hip-Hop Albums.

== Track listing ==
No.	Title	Producer(s)	Length
1.	"Interlude: Intro"		0:13
2.	"Ride On/Caught Up!" (performed by Snoop Doggy Dogg & Kurupt)	Mark In The Dark; Snoop Dogg; DJ Quik (co.)	4:42
3.	"Work" (performed by Gang Starr)	DJ Premier; GuRu (co.)	2:55
4.	"U Should Know Me" (performed by Joe)	Joe	4:46
5.	"You Don't Want None" (performed by Mack 10 & Road Dawgs)	Binky Mack	5:06
6.	"Interlude: Club Scene"		0:25
7.	"All in the Club" (performed by Do or Die, Danny Boy & Johnny P)	The Legendary Traxster	4:36
8.	"Ordinary Guy" (performed by Lost Boyz)	Bink Dogg	5:00
9.	"My Buddy" (performed by Luniz, Daz Dillinger & Kurupt)	Dat Nigga Daz; Priest "Soopafly" Brooks	4:18
10.	"Cross My Heart" (performed by Killah Priest, Inspectah Deck & GZA)	True Master	3:44
11.	"Ey-Yo! (The Reggae Virus)" (performed by KRS-One, Mad Lion & Shaggy)	KRS-One	3:51
12.	"Rock Me" (performed by AZ & Jermaine Dupri)	Jermaine Dupri; Carl So-Lowe (co.)	3:25
13.	"R.U. Down" (performed by Somethin' for the People)	Somethin' for the People	4:12
14.	"I Like" (performed by Shiro & MC Lyte)	Soulshock and Karlin	4:12
15.	"Interlude: Girl"		0:33
16.	"Girl" (performed by Luniz & Crooked I)	Mike Dean; Tone Capone	4:59
17.	"Made Men" (performed by O)	Rashad Coes	4:43
Total length:			56:58

== Charts ==
Chart (1998)	Peak position
US Billboard 200	30
US Top R&B/Hip-Hop Albums (Billboard)	6
