= Body of the Life Force =

Studio album by Afu-Ra
- Released: October 10, 2000
- Studios: D&D Studios, New York City
- Genre: Underground hip hop
- Length: 56:13
- Label: Koch
- Producers: DJ Premier; 5 Boro Deep; Da Beatminerz; DJ Muggs; DJ Roach; Joe Quinde; Mike Rone; P. King; True Master

Afu-Ra chronology
Body of the Life Force (2000)	Life Force Radio (2002)

Singles from Body of the Life Force
- 1. "Whirlwind Thru Cities" Released: December 8, 1998; 2. "Defeat" Released: August 17, 1999; 3. "Equality / Bring It Right" Released: 1999; 4. "D&D Soundclash" Released: 1999; 5. "Big Acts, Little Acts" Released: March 27, 2001

Professional ratings
Review scores
Source	Rating
AllMusic	3/5 stars
HipHopDX	4/5
NME	3.5/5 stars
RapReviews	5.5/10

Body of the Life Force is the debut studio album by American rapper Afu-Ra. Originally due to be released on Gee Street Records, it was released on October 10, 2000, via Koch Records. The recording sessions took place at D&D Studios, in New York. The production was handled by DJ Premier, DJ Roach, 5 Boro Deep, Da Beatminerz, DJ Muggs, Joe Quinde, Mike Rone, P. King, and True Master. It features guest appearances from GZA, Hannibal Stax, Jahdan Blakkamoore, Krumbsnatcha, Ky-Mani Marley, Masta Killa, M.O.P., and Smif-N-Wessun.

== Track listing ==
No.	Title	Writer(s)	Producer(s)	Length
1.	"Intro (The Body of the Life Force)" (featuring Asun The Black Sun)		5 Boro Deep	1:39
2.	"Soul Assassination"	Aaron Phillip; Lawrence Muggerud	DJ Muggs	3:13
3.	"Defeat"	Phillip; Chris Martin	DJ Premier	3:24
4.	"Big Acts, Little Acts" (featuring GZA)	Phillip; Gary Grice; Derek Harris	True Master	3:44
5.	"Quotations"			0:39
6.	"D&D Soundclash" (featuring Smif-N-Wessun & Jahdan Blakkamoore)	Phillip; Tekomin Williams; Darrell Yates Jr.; Ewart C. Dewgarde; Barrington Levy; Cecil Wellington; H. Wright	Da Beatminerz	4:16
7.	"Mic Stance"	Phillip; Martin	DJ Premier	4:10
8.	"Caliente" (featuring Rasheedah)	Phillip; Rasheedah Gacria; Joe Quinde	Joe Quinde	3:25
9.	"All That" (featuring Hannibal Stax & Krumbsnatcha)	Phillip; Demetrius Gibbs; Steven Johnson; Lerone Idelett	Mike Rone	3:58
10.	"Headqcourterz (Skit)" (featuring Headqcuarterz)			0:27
11.	"Self Mastery"	Phillip; Joe Roach	DJ Roach	2:16
12.	"Visions (Skit)"	Phillip; Martin	DJ Premier	0:34
13.	"Mortal Kombat" (featuring Masta Killa)	Phillip; Elgin Turner; Roach	DJ Roach	3:15
14.	"Warfare" (featuring M.O.P.)	Phillip; Eric Murray; Jamal Grinnage; Idelett	Mike Rone	4:08
15.	"Equality" (featuring Ky-Mani Marley)	Phillip; Ky-Mani Marley; Martin	DJ Premier	4:37
16.	"Monotony"	Phillip; Martin	DJ Premier	4:02
17.	"Bring It Right"	Phillip; Peter Francis	P. King	4:27
18.	"Whirlwind Thru Cities"	Phillip; Roach	DJ Roach	3:59
Total length:				56:13

== Charts ==
Chart (2000)	Peak position
US Billboard 200	183
US Top R&B/Hip-Hop Albums (Billboard)	42
US Independent Albums (Billboard)	13
US Heatseekers Albums (Billboard)	11

=== Singles chart positions ===
Year	Song	Chart positions	
Year	Song	Hot R&B/Hip-Hop Singles & Tracks	Hot Rap Singles
1999	Whirlwind Thru Cities	-	#18
1999	Defeat	-	#40
2000	Equality	-	#33
2001	Big Acts, Little Acts	#57	#3
