= Oz (soundtrack) =

Music from and Inspired by the HBO Series Oz

Soundtrack album to Oz by various artists
- Released: January 9, 2001
- Genre: Hip hop
- Length: 1:04:27
- Label: Avatar
- Producers: Larry Robinson (exec.); Alvin "Stone" Clark; Carlos Stephens; Chuck Blagmon; David Banner; Def Jef; DJ Muggs; DJ Paul; DJ Rek; Domingo; Juicy J; Lee Stone; Mahogany; Meech Wells; Mike Dean; Pharoahe Monch; Suave House Productions; Swizz Beatz; True Master

Singles from Music from and Inspired by the HBO Series Oz
- 1. "Behind the Walls" Released: May 22, 2001

Professional ratings
Review scores
| Source | Rating |
|---|---|
| AllMusic | 3/5 stars |
| Now | 5/5 Ns |
| RapReviews | 7.5/10 |

Oz: The Soundtrack is the soundtrack album to the HBO television series Oz. It was released on January 9, 2001, through Nettwerk/Avatar Records and composed of hip hop music.

The album debuted at number 42 on the Billboard 200 and number 8 on the Top R&B/Hip-Hop Albums charts in the United States. It spawned a single "Behind the Walls", which peaked at No. 52 on the Hot R&B/Hip-Hop Songs.

== Track listing ==
| No. | Title | Producer | Length |
|---|---|---|---|
| 1. | "Intro" | | 0:19 |
| 2. | "Behind the Walls" (Kurupt & Nate Dogg) | Mike Dean | 4:29 |
| 3. | "What You in Fo'" (Wu-Tang Clan) | True Master | 3:14 |
| 4. | "Land of Oz" (Snoop Dogg) | Meech Wells | 3:45 |
| 5. | "What Is the Law" (Pharoahe Monch) | Lee Stone; Pharoahe Monch | 3:17 |
| 6. | "Shackled Up" (Krayzie Bone) | Def Jef | 4:49 |
| 7. | "Locked Up" (Master P) | Carlos Stephens | 3:33 |
| 8. | "Can't Wait" (Devin the Dude) | Suave House Productions | 4:24 |
| 9. | "Oz Theme 2000" (Kool G Rap, Lord Jamar & Talib Kweli) | Domingo | 4:05 |
| 10. | "Ain't No Sunshine" (East Side Cult & Ria Alexander) | Chuck Blagmon | 4:21 |
| 11. | "Can I Live" (Cypress Hill) | DJ Muggs | 4:17 |
| 12. | "Some Niggas" (Styles P & Jadakiss) | Mahogany | 4:22 |
| 13. | "Thug Niggas Don't Live That Long" (Trick Daddy) | Alvin "Stone" Clark | 3:52 |
| 14. | "Tonight" (Drag-On) | Swizz Beatz | 4:52 |
| 15. | "Incarcerated" (Magic, BlaXuede & Fiend) | David Banner | 3:42 |
| 16. | "War Wit Us" (Three 6 Mafia) | DJ Paul; Juicy J | 3:45 |
| 17. | "What Ya Gonna Do" (Tez & Tajiee) | DJ Rek | 3:21 |
| Total length: | | | 1:04:27 |

Notes

- Track 3 features vocals from Method Man, RZA and Raekwon, and uncredited vocals from Streetlife.
- Track 4 features uncredited vocals from Kokane.
- Track 7 features uncredited vocals from Crazy, Short Circuit and Slay Sean.
- Track 14 features uncredited vocals from Swizz Beatz.

== Charts ==
=== Weekly charts ===
| Chart (2001) | Peak position |
|---|---|
| US Billboard 200 | 42 |
| US Top R&B/Hip-Hop Albums (Billboard) | 8 |

=== Year-end charts ===
| Chart (2001) | Position |
|---|---|
| US Top R&B/Hip-Hop Albums (Billboard) | 100 |
