= Street Life (rapper) =

American rapper

- Born: Patrick Charles; September 7, 1972 (age 53); The Bronx, New York City, U.S.
- Origin: Staten Island, New York City, U.S.
- Genres: East Coast hip-hop
- Occupation: Rapper
- Years active: 1993–present

Patrick Charles (born September 7, 1972), known professionally as Street Life, is an American rapper who is a close associate of the Wu-Tang Clan and its affiliate Wu-Tang Killa Beez, particularly of Method Man. He was born in the Bronx and moved to Houston, and later moved to Staten Island where he grew up.

== Career ==
He made his debut with an appearance on "Mr. Sandman" from Method Man's debut album Tical. It was originally intended to appear on Ghostface Killah's Ironman on the track "Box In Hand" but the track was pulled from the album at the last minute (the track replacing it subsequently becoming known as "Box In Hand", it being too late to change the album packaging). The original version became known as "Box In Hand (Remix)." Street went on to make two appearances on Wu-Tang Clan's second album Wu-Tang Forever in 1997 and seven appearances on Method Man's second album Tical 2000: Judgement Day the next year, after which he continued to make appearances on the Clan's albums and on the members' various solo projects.

His solo debut album was originally intended to be released in the busy 1998–1999 period but, as was soon to become the norm for Wu-Tang releases, it was repeatedly delayed, eventually seeing release titled Street Education in 2005. Though Method Man only made three short appearances on the album, he was billed as the executive producer. Alongside Cappadonna, he has been featured on every group album besides their debut. He appeared on 8 Diagrams on the tracks "Starter" and "Tar Pit" (on the non-U.S. and limited edition Best Buy version). Neither Street Life nor Cappadonna were credited with guest appearances.

Street Life is also an avid video gamer, and claims to be able to play at SOCOM for as long as 18 hours straight. He used to play basketball as a teenager, and wanted to go to college, but a car accident damaged his knees. His love for the game remains as he coaches his son's basketball team.

== Legal issues ==
In November 2009, Street Life and Wu-Tang producer Mathematics "were taken into custody on a Monday night after a routine traffic stop led to the discovery of a large stash of marijuana and ecstasy on their tour bus" while traveling through Arkansas in November. According to police reports, "The bus was filled with smoke and the odor of marijuana." The cops then boarded the vehicle and discovered "marijuana blunts and residue... laying in plain sight". The officers reportedly also found 100 ecstasy tablets and $8,615 in cash.

== Discography ==
=== Studio albums ===
- Street Education (2005)

== Compilations ==
- Natural Born Hustler (2006) (European re-issue of Street Education)
- Back to Back: Raw & Uncut (2008)

=== Appears on ===
Year	Song title	Album
1994	"All I Need"; "Mr. Sandman"	Method Man - Tical
1996	"Semi-Automatic: Full Rap Metal Jacket"	High School High Soundtrack
1997	"Clash of Titans"	Killarmy - Silent Weapons for Quiet Wars
1997	"Deadly Melody"	Wu-Tang Clan - Wu-Tang Forever
1997	"Hellz Windz Staff"	Wu-Tang Clan - Wu-Tang Forever
1998	"And You Don't Stop"	Rush Hour (soundtrack)
1998	"Dangerous Grounds"	Method Man - Tical 2000: Judgement Day
1998	"Sweet Love"	Method Man - Tical 2000: Judgement Day
1998	"Spazzola"	Method Man - Tical 2000: Judgement Day
1998	"Suspect Chin Music"	Method Man - Tical 2000: Judgement Day
1998	"Grid Iron Rap"	Method Man - Tical 2000: Judgement Day
1998	"Play IV Keeps"	Method Man - Tical 2000: Judgement Day
1998	"Snuffed Out"	Method Man - Tical 2000: Judgement Day
1998	"S.O.S."	Wu-Tang Killa Bees: The Swarm
1998	"Execute Them"	Wu-Tang Killa Bees: The Swarm
1998	"One More to Go"	Deadly Venoms - Antidote
1999	"Run 4 Cover"	Method Man & Redman - Blackout!
1999	"9th Chamber"	Inspectah Deck - Uncontrolled Substance
1999	"The Grand Prix"	Inspectah Deck - Uncontrolled Substance
1999	"The Cause"	Inspectah Deck - Uncontrolled Substance
1999	"Shaolin Worldwide"	Next Friday (soundtrack)
2000	"Do You Really (Thang, Thang)"	Wu-Tang Clan - The W
2001	"What You in Fo'"	Oz (soundtrack)
2001	"Glocko Pop"	RZA - Digital Bullet
2001	"In the Hood"	Wu-Tang Clan - Iron Flag
2001	"Rules"	Wu-Tang Clan - Iron Flag
2001	"Enjoy da Ride"	Redman - Malpractice
2001	"Who Wanna Rap"	How High Soundtrack
2002	"The Earthquake"	Protect Ya Neck Collection Vol. 1
2002	"Silent"	GZA - Legend of the Liquid Sword
2003	"Shorty Right There"	Inspectah Deck - The Movement
2003	"Gun Talk"	Mathematics - Love, Hell or Right
2004	"The Drummer"	Theodore Unit - 718
2004	"The Prequel"	Method Man - Tical 0: The Prequel
2004	"Who Ya Rollin Wit"	Method Man - Tical 0: The Prequel
2004	"Crooked Letter I"	Method Man - Tical 0: The Prequel
2004	"Whatever"	Masta Killa - No Said Date
2006	"4:20"	Method Man - 4:21...The Day After
2006	"Everything"	Method Man - 4:21...The Day After
2007	"Starter"	Wu-Tang Clan - 8 Diagrams
2007	"Tar Pit"	Wu-Tang Clan - 8 Diagrams
2009	"How Bout Dat?"	Method Man & Redman - Blackout! 2
2009	"Aqui Mando Yo"	Phil Anastasia - The Outfit LP
2010	"Smooth Sailing (Remix)"	Method Man, Ghostface Killah & Raekwon - Wu-Massacre
2012	"Built for This"	Method Man, Street Life & Freddie Gibbs - The Man with the Iron Fists
2015	"The Meth Lab"	Method Man - The Meth Lab
2015	"Straight Gutta"	Method Man - The Meth Lab
2015	"Bang Zoom"	Method Man - The Meth Lab
2015	"50 Shots"	Method Man - The Meth Lab
2015	"The Pledge"	Method Man - The Meth Lab
2015	"Intelligent Meth"	Method Man - The Meth Lab
2015	"Symphony"	Method Man - The Meth Lab
2015	"What You Getting Into"	Method Man - The Meth Lab
2015	"Another Winter"	Method Man - The Meth Lab
2017	"If What You Say Is True	Wu-Tang Clan - The Saga Continues
2019	"Squad Up " Ft Method Man n Havoc (Mobb Deep)	Street Life Ft Method Man - TBA
