= No Said Date =

Studio album by Masta Killa
- Released: June 1, 2004
- Recorded: 1997–2004
- Studios: 36 Chambers Studios (New York, NY)
- Genre: Hip-hop
- Length: 47:45
- Label: Nature Sounds
- Producers: Allah Mathematics; Baby Dooks; Brock; Jose "Choco" Reynoso; RZA; Dave West; True Master

Masta Killa chronology
No Said Date (2004)	Made in Brooklyn (2006)

Wu-Tang Clan solo chronology
Tical 0: The Prequel (2004)	No Said Date (2004)	A Son Unique (2005)

No Said Date is the debut solo studio album by American rapper Masta Killa. It was released on June 1, 2004, via Nature Sounds. Recording sessions took place at 36 Chamber Studios in New York City. Production was handled by DJ Mathematics, RZA, True Master, Baby Dooks, Brock, Jose "Choco" Reynoso and Supa Dave West. It features guest appearances from the rest of the Wu-Tang Clan, as well as its affiliates Killah Priest, Prodigal Sunn, Startel, and Streetlife, with cameos from Masta Killa's sons Jamel and Shamel Irief.

In the United States, the album debuted at number 136 on the Billboard 200, number 31 on the Top R&B/Hip-Hop Albums, number 3 on the Heatseekers Albums and number 4 on the Independent Albums charts.

The songs "D.T.D.", "Digi Warfare" and "Old Man" appear in the 2006 video game Saints Row.

== Critical reception ==
Professional ratings
Aggregate scores
Source	Rating
Metacritic	86/100
Review scores
Source	Rating
AllHipHop	4/5 stars
AllMusic	4/5 stars
The Austin Chronicle	3.5/4 stars
Cokemachineglow	79/100%
Pitchfork	8.3/10
Prefix	7/10
RapReviews	9/10
Stylus	A−
Tiny Mix Tapes	5/5 marks
The Village Voice	(2-star Honorable Mention)

No Said Date was met with universal acclaim from music critics. At Metacritic, which assigns a normalized rating out of 100 to reviews from mainstream publications, the album received an average score of 86 based on six reviews.

James Corne of RapReviews praised the album, resuming: "overall, No Said Date is the collective combination of stellar performances across the board". Scott McKeating of Stylus called it "a return to the Wu sound; in-house production, more Clan cameos and less material dictated by current trends commercial". Pitchfork stated: "Masta Killa has delivered one the most urgent, straightforward Wu releases since the group's debut over a decade ago". AllMusic's Stewart Mason noted the rapper's "aggressive but nimble flow is all over each of these songs". Chet Betz of Cokemachineglow wrote: "together, "School" and "Silverbacks" make the best Wu-Tang one-two punch that I can recall".

== Track listing ==
No.	Title	Producer(s)	Length
1.	"Born Chamber" (Intro)		1:16
2.	"Grab the Mic"	Brock	2:59
3.	"No Said Date"	RZA	2:44
4.	"Last Drink"	Mathematics	4:03
5.	"Love Spell" (Featuring Startel)	Dave West	4:14
6.	"The Future (Skit)"		1:28
7.	"D.T.D." (featuring Raekwon and Ghostface Killah)	Mathematics	4:13
8.	"Whatever" (featuring Streetlife and Prodigal Sunn)	Mathematics	2:54
9.	"Secret Rivals" (featuring Killah Priest and Method Man)	True Master	3:29
10.	"Skit"		0:24
11.	"Digi Warfare"	Jose "Choco" Reynoso	4:06
12.	"Old Man" (featuring Ol' Dirty Bastard and RZA)	RZA	2:46
13.	"Queen"	True Master	3:40
14.	"School" (featuring RZA)	RZA	3:12
15.	"Silverbacks" (featuring Inspectah Deck and GZA)	True Master	3:26
16.	"Masta Killa"	Baby Dooks	2:51
Total length:			47:45

== Personnel ==
- Elgin "Masta Killa" Turner – songwriter, vocals, executive producer
- Corey "Raekwon" Woods – vocals (track 7)
- Dennis "Ghostface Killah" Coles – vocals (track 7)
- Patrick "Streetlife" Charles – vocals (track 8)
- Lamar "Prodigal Sunn" Ruff – vocals (track 8)
- Walter "Killah Priest" Reed – vocals (track 9)
- Clifford "Method Man" Smith – vocals (track 9)
- Robert "RZA" Diggs – additional vocals (track 11), vocals (tracks: 12, 14), producer (tracks: 3, 12, 14), executive producer
- Lamont "U-God" Hawkins – additional vocals (track 11)
- Russell "Ol' Dirty Bastard" Jones – vocals (track 12)
- Jason "Inspectah Deck" Hunter – vocals (track 15)
- Gary "GZA" Grice – vocals (track 15), executive producer
- Brock – producer (track 2)
- Ronald "Mathematics" Bean – producer (tracks: 4, 7, 8)
- David "Supa Dave" West – producer (track 5)
- Derrick "True Master" Harris – producer (tracks: 9, 13, 15)
- Jose "Choco" Reynoso – producer (track 11), recording, mixing
- David "Baby Dooks" Vurdelja – producer (track 16)
- Michael Sarsfield – mastering
- Amal McCaskill – co-executive producer
- Devin Horwitz – co-executive producer
- James "Dreddy Kruger" Dockery – A&R

== Charts ==
Chart (2004)	Peak position
US Billboard 200	136
US Top R&B/Hip-Hop Albums (Billboard)	31
US Heatseekers Albums (Billboard)	3
US Independent Albums (Billboard)	4
