= Heavy Mental =

Studio album by Killah Priest
- Released: March 1998
- Recorded: 1997–98, 1995 (B.I.B.L.E.)
- Genre: Hip hop
- Length: 74:12
- Labels: Geffen; MCA GEFD-24971
- Producers: True Master; Y-Kim; 4th Disciple; Killah Priest; The Arabian Knight; John the Baptist

Killah Priest chronology
Heavy Mental (1998)	View from Masada (2000)

Heavy Mental is the debut studio album by the American rapper Killah Priest, released in March 1998. Killah Priest is an associate of hip-hop group Wu-Tang Clan and a member of the group Sunz of Man.

The album contains references to Judeo-Christian-Islamic mythology and theology, drawing parallels to the condition of Black people in the United States to that of the Jewish people during Exodus. A notable track on the CD is "B.I.B.L.E. (Basic Instructions Before Leaving Earth)", which had appeared on GZA's 1995 Liquid Swords album in a slightly different form. Another is the title track, which features Killah Priest rhyming in a style reminiscent of slam poetry and prominently features a didgeridoo. "One Step", with its refrain of "Your arms too short to box with God", reached No. 84 on the Billboard Hot R&B/Hip Hop singles chart. The album peaked at No. 24 on the Billboard 200 and No. 4 on the Top R&B/Hip Hop charts.

== Critical reception ==
Professional ratings
Review scores
Source	Rating
AllMusic	4/5 stars
Robert Christgau	A−
NME	8/10
RapReviews	8.5/10
The Source	3/5 stars
Spin	8/10

Spin noted that Killah Priest's rapping is "more consistently metaphysical than Ghostface's blunt confessions but still in line with the Wu belief that black soul is more interesting than black violence." Robert Christgau deemed the album "Shaolin mystagogy meets millenarian panic in music for the end time."

== Track listing ==
Track listing information is taken from the official liner notes.

Heavy Mental
No.	Title	Writer(s)	Producer(s)	Length
1.	"Intro"			0:53
2.	"One Step" (Featuring Tekitha and Hell Razah)	Walter Reed; Derek Harris	True Master	4:20
3.	"Blessed Are Those"	Reed; Ernest Aye	Y-Kim the illfigure	3:28
4.	"From Then Till Now"	Reed; Aye	Y-Kim the illfigure	3:44
5.	"Cross My Heart" (Featuring Inspectah Deck and Genius/GZA)	Reed; Harris; Jason Hunter; Gary Grice	True Master	3:46
6.	"Fake MC's"	Reed; Selwyn Bogard	4th Disciple	3:36
7.	"It's Over"	Reed; Bogard	4th Disciple	3:29
8.	"Crusaids"	Reed; Bogard	4th Disciple	0:58
9.	"Tai Chi" (Featuring Hell Razah, 60 Second Assassin and Father Lord: R.I.P.)	Reed; Bogard; C. Smith; F. Cuffie	4th Disciple	4:02
10.	"Heavy Mental"	Reed	Killah Priest	4:16
11.	"If You Don't Know" (Featuring Ol' Dirty Bastard)	Reed; Russell Jones; Harris	True Master	5:15
12.	"Atoms to Adam" (Featuring Shangai the Messenger)	Reed; Bogard	4th Disciple	5:28
13.	"High Explosives"	Reed; Sulayman Ansari	The Arabian Knight	3:04
14.	"Wisdom"	Reed; Bogard	4th Disciple	2:03
15.	"B.I.B.L.E."	Reed; Bogard	4th Disciple	4:52
16.	"Mystic City"	Reed; Aye	Y-Kim the illfigure	4:11
17.	"Information"	Reed; Bogard	4th Disciple	4:42
18.	"Science Projects" (Featuring Hell Razah)	Reed; Bogard	4th Disciple	4:19
19.	"Almost There"	Reed; Bogard	4th Disciple	3:55
20.	"The Professional"	Reed; John Hitchman, Jr.	John The Baptist	3:48
Total length:				74:09

Notes

- "The Professional" is only found on CD versions of the album.

Samples

- "From Then Till Now" contains a sample of "Diamonds Are Forever", written by D. Black/J. Barry and performed by London Starlight Orchestra, and a sample of "The Man in the Raincoat", written by W. Warwick and performed by Marion Marlow.
- "Fake MC's" contains a sample of "My Little Brown Book", written by B. Strayhorn and performed by John Coltrane & Duke Ellington.
- "Atoms to Adam" contains a sample of "Sweet Pain", written by M. Brook/Ali Khan and performed by Nusrat Fateh Ali Kahn, and dialogue from the speech "Blue Eyed Devil" by Malcolm X.
- "Information" contains a sample of "All the Kings Horses", written by Aretha Franklin and performed by Grover Washington Jr.

== Album singles ==
Single information
"Cross My Heart" (featuring GZA and Inspectah Deck)
- Released: 1997
- B-Side:
"One Step" (featuring Tekitha & Hell Razah)
- Released: 1998
- B-Side: "Moanin'" (feat. Killa Sin) / "Street Opera" (feat. Hell Razah)
"If You Don't Know" (featuring Ol' Dirty Bastard)
- Released: 1998
- B-Side: "Blessed Are Those"
