= Digital Bullet =

Studio album by RZA as Bobby Digital
- Released: August 28, 2001
- Recorded: 2000–2001
- Genre: Hip hop
- Length: 71:14
- Label: Wu-Tang; In the Paint; Koch
- Producer: RZA; Mathematics; True Master; Tony Touch

RZA chronology
The RZA Hits (1999)	Digital Bullet (2001)	The World According to RZA (2003)

Wu-Tang Clan solo chronology
The Yin and the Yang (2001)	Digital Bullet (2001)	Bulletproof Wallets (2001)

Professional ratings
Aggregate scores
Source	Rating
Metacritic	67/100
Review scores
Source	Rating
AllMusic	4/5 stars
The A.V. Club	(favorable)
Entertainment Weekly	B
NME	6/10 stars
RapReviews	7/10 stars
Rolling Stone	2.5/5 stars
Stylus	B−

Digital Bullet is the second solo studio album by American hip hop artist RZA under his pseudonym Bobby Digital. The album was released on August 28, 2001. As a sequel to Bobby Digital in Stereo (1998), the album focuses on an attempt to develop Bobby Digital further, and follows a loose story arc that focused on the character becoming more enlightened and more disillusioned with hedonism as the album progresses. The limited-edition version sold at Best Buy outlets featured two bonus tracks, which were also on the Japanese version of the album released by JVC Records.

== Track listing ==
Track listing information is taken from the official liner notes and AllMusic.

Digital Bullet
No.	Title	Writer(s)	Producer(s)	Length
1.	"Show U Love"	Robert Diggs	RZA	3:58
2.	"Can't Lose" (feat. Berretta 9)	Robert Diggs; Samuel Murray	RZA	1:46
3.	"Glocko Pop" (feat. Method Man, Streetlife, Masta Killa and Jamie Sommers)	Robert Diggs; Clifford Smith; Elgin Turner; Patrick Charles	RZA	4:53
4.	"Must Be Bobby"	Robert Diggs; Ronald Dean	Mathematics	3:28
5.	"Brooklyn Babies" (feat. Masta Killa)	Robert Diggs; Elgin Turner	RZA	3:51
6.	"Domestic Violence Pt. 2" (feat. Big Gipp)	Robert Diggs; Cameron Gipp	Tony Touch	3:38
7.	"Do U" (feat. GZA, Prodical)	Robert Diggs; Gary Grice; Vergil Ruff	RZA	4:02
8.	"Fools" (feat. Killa Sin)	Robert Diggs; Jeryl Grant	RZA	3:18
9.	"La Rhumba" (feat. Method Man, Killa Sin, Berretta 9)	Robert Diggs; Clifford Smith; Jeryl Grant; Samuel Murray; Endura Aumaitre	True Master	4:20
10.	"Black Widow Pt. 2" (feat. ODB)	Robert Diggs; Russell Jones	RZA	2:53
11.	"Shady" (feat. Intrigue)	Robert Diggs; Talani Rabb; Jailyn Matthews; Natashia Williams; Sarah Benjamin	RZA	4:09
12.	"Break Bread" (feat. Jamie Sommers)	Robert Diggs; Dennis Coles; Tonia Shivers	RZA	3:11
13.	"Bong Bong" (feat. Berretta 9, Mad Cez)	Robert Diggs; Samuel Murray; Samantha Brown	RZA	4:10
14.	"Throw Your Flag Up" (feat. Black Knights)	Robert Diggs; Quintarus Bennett; Dewayne Rose	RZA	5:18
15.	"Be A Man"	Robert Diggs	RZA	3:23
16.	"Righteous Way" (feat. Jr. Reid)	Robert Diggs; Delroy Reid	RZA	5:22
17.	"Build Strong" (feat. Tekitha)	Robert Diggs; Tekitha Washington	RZA	4:33
18.	"Sickness"	Robert Diggs	RZA	4:59
Total length:				71:12

Digital Bullet – Bonus tracks in Japan and the Best Buy-only exclusive edition
No.	Title	Writer(s)	Producer(s)	Length
19.	"Odyssey" (feat. Isaac Hayes Band)	Robert Diggs	RZA	3:41
20.	"Cousins" (feat. Doc Gyneco, Cilvaringz)	Robert Diggs; Tariq Azzougarh; Bruno Beausir	RZA	2:56
Total length:				77:49

Notes

- "Glocko Pop" features vocals by Method Man, Masta Killa and Streetlife, not the entire Wu-Tang Clan.
- "Brooklyn Babies" features uncredited singing by Force MDs.
- "Fools" features uncredited vocals by Solomon Childs.
- "Shady" features uncredited vocals by Berretta 9.

== Charts ==
Chart (2001)	Peak position
US Billboard 200	24
US Top R&B/Hip-Hop Albums (Billboard)	9
