= The Movement (Inspectah Deck album) =

Studio album by Inspectah Deck
- Released: June 10, 2003
- Recorded: 2002–2003
- Genre: Hip-hop
- Length: 58:49
- Label: Koch Records
- Producers: Arabian Knight; Ayatollah; Falling Down; Phantom of the Beats

Inspectah Deck chronology
Uncontrolled Substance (1999)	The Movement (2003)	The Resident Patient (2006)

Wu-Tang Clan solo chronology
Legend of the Liquid Sword (2002)	The Movement (2003)	Birth of a Prince (2003)

Professional ratings
Review scores
Source	Rating
AllMusic	4/5 stars
HipHopDX	3/5
laut.de	3/5 stars
RapReviews	7.5/10

The Movement is the second studio album by American rapper and Wu-Tang Clan member Inspectah Deck. It was released on June 10, 2003 through Koch Records. Production was handled by Phantom of the Beats, Ayatollah, Arabian Knight and Falling Down, with Inspectah Deck serving as executive producer and Saadiq Busby as associate executive producer. It features guest appearances from Killa Sin, Kool G Rap, Mojehan and Streetlife. The album peaked at number 137 on the Billboard 200 and number 29 on the Top R&B/Hip-Hop Albums in the United States.

On September 8, 2023, The Movement was released on vinyl for the first time in honor of the album's 20th anniversary.

== Background ==
A departure from Uncontrolled Substance's darker, soul-inspired sound, The Movement is more upbeat and expressive. According to Inspectah Deck, "Uncontrolled Substance was just me as an ill lyricist wanting to put an album out. I just wanted to be heard. The Movement is like is me behind the scenes, behind everything. I'm doing … everything. All the credits got Inspectah Deck on it this time. I was able to put my soul into it".

== Track listing ==
No.	Title	Writer(s)	Producer(s)	Length
1.	"Intro (The Movement)"	Jason Richard Hunter		0:49
2.	"City High"	Hunter	Phantom of the Beats	3:18
3.	"That Shit"	Hunter	Phantom of the Beats	4:03
4.	"Get Right"	Hunter	Phantom of the Beats	3:44
5.	"The Movement"	Hunter	Ayatollah	3:56
6.	"Who Got It"	Hunter	Ayatollah	4:08
7.	"It's Like That"	Hunter	Arabian Knight	3:25
8.	"Shorty Right There" (featuring Streetlife)	Hunter; Patrick Charles	Ayatollah	2:59
9.	"U Wanna Be"	Hunter	Phantom of the Beats	4:30
10.	"Framed" (featuring Kool G Rap and Killa Sin)	Hunter; Nathaniel Thomas Wilson; Jeryl Grant	Phantom of the Beats	2:51
11.	"Bumpin' and Grindin'"	Hunter	Phantom of the Beats	4:05
12.	"Vendetta"	Hunter	Ayatollah	3:37
13.	"The Stereotype"	Hunter	Ayatollah	3:55
14.	"That Nigga"	Hunter	Ayatollah	3:50
15.	"Big City"	Hunter	Phantom of the Beats	3:34
16.	"Cradle to the Grave" (featuring Mojehan)	Hunter	Falling Down	5:57
Total length:				58:49

== Personnel ==
- Jason "Inspectah Deck" Hunter – main performer, executive producer
- Patrick "Streetlife" Charles – featured performer (track 8)
- Nathaniel "Kool G Rap" Wilson – featured performer (track 10)
- Jeryl "Killa Sin" Grant – featured performer (track 10)
- Mojehan – featured performer (track 16)
- Carlos "Phantom of the Beats" Evans – producer (tracks: 2–4, 9–11, 15)
- Lamont "Ayatollah" Dorrell – producer (tracks: 5, 6, 8, 12–14)
- Suleyman "Arabian Knight" Ansari – producer (track 7)
- Marc "Falling Down" McWilliams – producer (track 16)
- Saadiq Busby – associate executive producer
- Rock Logic – mixing
- Jeff Chenault – art direction, design
- Daragh McDonagh – photography

== Charts ==
Chart performance for The Movement
Chart (2003)	Peak position
US Billboard 200	137
US Top R&B/Hip-Hop Albums (Billboard)	29
US Independent Albums (Billboard)	7
