= This Is Now!!! =

Studio album by Craig G
- Released: May 20, 2003
- Studio: D&D, New York City
- Genre: Hip hop
- Length: 59:19
- Label: D&D
- Producer: David Lotwin; Doug Grama; DJ Sage; Curt Cazal; the Alchemist; Arabian Knight; Caspa; Da Beatminerz; DJ Premier; Domingo; Kenny Muhammad the Human Orchestra; Large Professor; Marley Marl; Nottz; Rockwilder; Will Pack

Craig G chronology
Now, That's More Like It (1991)	This Is Now!!! (2003)	Climate Control (2006)

Professional ratings
Review scores
Source	Rating
AllMusic	3/5 stars
HipHopDX	3.5/5 stars
The Source	3.5/5 stars

This Is Now!!! is the third studio album by American rapper Craig G. It was released on May 20, 2003, on D&D Records. The album was produced by the Alchemist, Arabian Knight, Caspa, Curt Cazal, Da Beatminerz, DJ Premier, DJ Sage, Domingo, Kenny Muhammad the Human Orchestra, Large Professor, Marley Marl, Nottz, Rockwilder, and Will Pack, with executive production provided by David Lotwin and Douglas Grama. It featured guest appearances from Afu-Ra, Kenny Muhammad the Human Orchestra, Krumbsnatcha, Large Professor, Mr. Cheeks, and Will Pack. The album debuted at number 99 on the Top R&B/Hip-Hop Albums. It spawned four singles: "Say What Ya Want", "Let's Get Up", "Stomped"/"Make You Say Yes", "Now That's What's Up"/"Ready Set Begin", but none of them charted.

== Track listing ==
No.	Title	Producer(s)	Length
1.	"Don't Care Who We Bang"	Curt Cazal	3:53
2.	"Wrong Chick"	The Alchemist	3:19
3.	"Ready Set Begin"	DJ Premier	3:23
4.	"Place Ya Bets"	Curt Cazal	4:12
5.	"Now That's What's Up" (featuring Mr. Cheeks)	Nottz	3:53
6.	"Words from Warbucks" (Skit)	DJ Sage	1:32
7.	"Stomped"	Rockwilder	3:19
8.	"Let's Get Up"	Marley Marl	3:42
9.	"Damn This Day"	DJ Sage	3:43
10.	"Frostbit" (Skit) (featuring Will Pack)	Will Pack	1:07
11.	"Love Is Love" (featuring Large Professor)	Large Professor	4:17
12.	"Dribble or Shoot" (featuring Afu-Ra & Kenny Muhammad the Human Orchestra)	Kenny Muhammad the Human Orchestra	2:14
13.	"Do It Over Again"	Domingo	3:56
14.	"Make You Say Yes" (featuring Krumbsnatcha)	Da Beatminerz	4:54
15.	"Executioner Song"	Caspa	2:35
16.	"Say What Ya Want"	Arabian Knight	3:37
17.	"Freestyle Bonus" (Skit)		5:43
Total length:			59:19

== Personnel ==
- Craig Curry – main artist
- Terrance Kelly – featured artist (track 5)
- Will Pack – featured artist & producer (track 10)
- William Paul Mitchell – featured artist & producer (track 11)
- Kenny Muhammad the Human Orchestra – featured artist & producer (track 12)
- Aaron Ocosice Phillip – featured artist (track 12)
- Demetrius Lamont Gibbs – featured artist (track 14)
- Curtis Andre Small – producer (tracks: 1, 4)
- Daniel Alan Maman – producer (track 2)
- Christopher Edward Martin – producer (track 3)
- Dominick J. Lamb – producer (track 5)
- DJ Sage – producer (tracks: 6, 9)
- Dana Stinson – producer (track 7)
- Marlon Williams – producer (track 8)
- Domingo Padilla – producer (track 13)
- Da Beatminerz – producer (track 14)
- Ted Hogan – producer (track 15)
- Suleyman Ansari – producer (track 16)
- David Lotwin – executive producer
- Douglas Grama – executive producer, recording (tracks: 2, 7, 13)
- Eric Steinen – recording (tracks: 1, 5, 7, 13)
- Kieran Walsh – recording (tracks: 2, 3, 8, 9, 11, 12, 14, 16), mixing (tracks: 1, 2, 4, 5, 8, 9, 11–14, 16)
- Dejuana Richardson – recording (tracks: 4, 15), mixing (track 15)
- Dexter Thibou – mixing (track 3)
- Pat Viala – mixing (track 7)
- Tony Dawsey – mastering
- Steve Hervatic – design
- Michael Schreiber – photography

== Charts ==
Chart (2003)	Peak position
US Top R&B/Hip-Hop Albums (Billboard)	99
