= Legend of the Liquid Sword (album) =

Studio album by GZA/Genius
- Released: December 10, 2002
- Recorded: 2001–2002
- Genre: Hip-hop
- Length: 50:32
- Label: MCA; Universal
- Producer: Bink!; GZA; Arabian Knight; Mathematics; RZA; Jaz-O; DJ Muggs

GZA/Genius chronology
Beneath the Surface (1999)	Legend of the Liquid Sword (2002)	Grandmasters (2005)

Wu-Tang Clan solo chronology
Bulletproof Wallets (2001)	Legend of the Liquid Sword (2002)	The Movement (2003)

Legend of the Liquid Sword is the fourth solo studio album by American hip-hop artist GZA, a member of the Wu-Tang Clan. It was released on December 10, 2002. The album is named after the kung fu film Legend of the Liquid Sword. In the songs "Did Ya Say That", and "Knock Knock", GZA focuses on the politics of record labels, and expresses his issues in dealing with record companies over artistic goals in music.

== Critical reception ==
Professional ratings
Review scores
Source	Rating
AllMusic	3/5 stars
Blender	3/5 stars
Christgau’s Consumer Guide	(2-star Honorable Mention)
HipHopDX	4/5
Pitchfork	8.3/10
RapReviews	9/10
Rolling Stone	4/5 stars
The Source	4/5 stars
Stylus	B
Vibe	4/5 stars

Brett Berliner of Stylus Magazine said: "The man simply is brilliant, and although these aren’t the lyrics that will appeal to most, they are certainly some of the best. It’s just like why simple books appeal to the masses – most people can’t comprehend this much depth."

Jonah Weiner of Blender magazine stated: "This abstract skill put his 1995 masterpiece, Liquid Swords (name-checked here in the title and every other song), in the running for best Wu solo album, but dense, volatile production pushed it over the top — the prosaic soul loops here are solid enough, but fall short of the legend."

The overall sound of the album conflicted much of the mainstream hip-hop at the time of its release. Samira Niazy of prefixmag.com rated the album 8.0 out of 10 and concluded: "One of the things you'll notice is that GZA's more unique and real style shines through because he focuses on lyricism rather than distracting the listener with loud instrumental background noise. It draws your attention to his best asset, his distinct style. Thankfully, Legend of the Liquid Sword sounds nothing like the hip-pop that's on heavy rotation on hip-hop stations right now."

Though many opinions varied on whether the album was the classic "Wu-Tang sound", Ari Levenfeld of PopMatters feels: "If Legend of the Liquid Sword is any indication of the Wu-Tang Clan's efforts to come, it doesn't seem like the group is all that interested in expanding their fan base or growing musically. Maybe they've done what they set out to do. The franchise is working... GZA isn't trying to be something or someone he's not. He's all about the original recipe."

== Track listing ==
No.	Title	Writer(s)	Producer(s)	Length
1.	"Intro" (featuring Young Justice)	Justice Kareem		0:42
2.	"Auto Bio"	Gary Eldridge Grice	Jay "Waxx" Garfield	3:54
3.	"Did Ya Say That?"	Grice	Boola	3:54
4.	"Silent" (featuring Ghostface Killah & Streetlife)	Grice; Dennis David Coles; Patrick Charles	Bink!	2:41
5.	"Knock, Knock"	Grice	Jay "Waxx" Garfield	3:34
6.	"Stay in Line" (featuring Santi White)	Grice; Santi White	Arabian Knight	4:02
7.	"Animal Planet"	Grice	Tyquan Walker; Bink!	4:16
8.	"Fam (Members Only)" (featuring RZA & Masta Killa)	Grice; Robert Fitzgerald Diggs; Jamel Irief	Mathematics	4:10
9.	"Legend of the Liquid Sword" (featuring Anthony Allen)	Grice; Anthony Allen	Jaz-O	3:37
10.	"Fame"	Grice	Arabian Knight	3:45
11.	"Highway Robbery" (featuring Governor Two's)	Grice	Arabian Knight	4:00
12.	"Luminal"	Grice	DJ Muggs	2:59
13.	"Sparring Minds" (featuring Inspectah Deck)	Grice; Jason Richard Hunter	Arabian Knight	2:48
14.	"Rough Cut" (featuring 12 O'Clock, Prodigal Sunn & Armel)	Grice; Odion Turner; Lamar Ruff	RZA	3:05
15.	"Uncut Material"	Grice	GZA	2:58
Total length:				50:32

== Charts ==
Chart (2002)	Peak position
US Billboard 200	75
US Top R&B/Hip-Hop Albums (Billboard)	21
