= The Yin and the Yang =

The Yin and The Yang

Studio album by Cappadonna
- Released: April 3, 2001
- Recorded: 2000–2001
- Studio: Studio 57 (New York, NY); Hit Factory Criteria (Miami, FL); 36 Chambers Studios (New York, NY); Krosswire Studios (Atlanta, GA); Cheffield Studios (Baltimore, MD)
- Genre: Hip hop
- Length: 47:38
- Label: Razor Sharp; Epic
- Producer: Agallah; Goldfinghaz; Inspectah Deck; Jermaine Dupri; Neonek; True Master

Cappadonna chronology
The Pillage (1998)	The Yin and The Yang (2001)	The Struggle (2003)

Wu-Tang Clan solo chronology
Supreme Clientele (2000)	The Yin and the Yang (2001)	Digital Bullet (2001)

Professional ratings
Review scores
Source	Rating
AllMusic	2.5/5 stars
RapReviews	4.5/10
The Source	3.5/5 stars
Vibe	2.5/5 marks
Voir	2.5/5 stars

The Yin and The Yang is the second solo studio album by American rapper Cappadonna. It was released on April 3, 2001, via Razor Sharp/Epic Records.

== Background ==
The recording sessions took place at Studio 57 and at 36 Chambers Studios in New York, at the Hit Factory Criteria in Miami, at Krosswire Studios in Atlanta, and at Cheffield Studios in Baltimore. The album was produced by Neonek, Goldfinghaz, Agallah, Inspectah Deck, Jermaine Dupri, and True Master. It features guest appearances from Agallah, Crunch, Culture, Da Brat, Ghostface Killah, Jamie Sommers, Jermaine Dupri, Killah Priest, Neonek, Raekwon, Shyheim, and Timbo King.

The album debuted at number 51 on the Billboard 200 and number 19 on the Top R&B/Hip-Hop Albums chart in the United States.

== Track listing ==
No.	Title	Writer(s)	Producer(s)	Length
1.	"The Grits" (featuring 8-Off)	Darryl Hill; Angel Aguilar; Sergio George; Huey Dunbar	8-Off	4:16
2.	"Super Model" (featuring Ghostface Killah)	Hill; Derek Harris	True Master	4:08
3.	"War Rats"	Hill; K. Isaacs	Neonek	4:36
4.	"Bread of Life" (featuring Killah Priest and Neonek)	Hill; Isaacs; Walter Reed	Neonek	4:32
5.	"Love Is the Message" (featuring Raekwon)	Hill; Corey Woods; Scott Kinchen; Kenneth Gamble; Leon Huff	Goldfinghaz	3:59
6.	"We Know" (featuring Jermaine Dupri and Da Brat)	Hill; Jermaine Dupri; Shawntae Harris	Jermaine Dupri	3:18
7.	"Shake Dat" (featuring Jamie Sommers)	Hill; Kinchen	Goldfinghaz	4:13
8.	"Big Business" (featuring Shyheim and Crunch)	Hill; Shyheim Franklin; Isaacs	Neonek	4:20
9.	"Revenge" (featuring Timbo King)	Hill; Timothy Drayton; Jason Hunter	Inspectah Deck	5:00
10.	"One Way 2 Zion" (featuring Culture)	Hill; Isaacs	Neonek	5:21
11.	"Save the Children" (featuring Culture)	Hill; Isaacs	Neonek	4:56
Total length:				48:39

Notes

- Track 11 is unlisted on physical versions of the album.

Sample credits

- Track 1 contains excerpts from "Lagrimas" written by Sergio George and Huey Dunbar and performed by Dark Latin Groove
- Track 5 contains a sample from "Love Is the Message" written by Kenneth Gamble and Leon Huff and performed by MFSB

== Charts ==
Chart (2001)	Peak position
US Billboard 200	51
US Top R&B/Hip-Hop Albums (Billboard)	19
