= Christopher Emdin =

American academic

Christopher Emdin is the Maxine Greene Chair for Distinguished Contributions to Education at Teachers College, Columbia University and Director of the Schupf Family IdeaLab at Skidmore College. He was previously the Robert Naslund Endowed Chair in Curriculum and Teaching at the University of Southern California. He is an American academic who was previously an Associate Professor of Science Education at the Teachers College, Columbia University where he also served as Director of Science Education at the Center for Health Equity and Urban Science Education (CHEUSE). He was a noted author of the Obama White House and regular contributor to HuffPost. He developed and partnered with the rapper GZA and the website Rap Genius to develop the Science Genius B.A.T.T.L.E.S, which engages students in science through the creation of raps and a final rap battle competition. Emdin is founder of the #HipHopEd web chat and social movement.

== Academic background ==
Emdin holds bachelor's degrees in Physical Anthropology, Biology, and Chemistry from Lehman College (2000). He also holds a M.S. in Natural Sciences from Rensselaer Polytechnic Institute (2003), and a PhD in Urban Education from the Graduate Center of the City University of New York, (2007).

== Bibliography ==
Emdin is the author of several books, including:

- Urban Science Education for the Hip-Hop Generation (2010)
- For White Folks Who Teach in the Hood...and the Rest of Y'all Too: Reality Pedagogy and Urban Education (2016), New York Times bestseller
- Between the World and the Urban Classroom, with George Sirrakos (2017)
- #HipHopEd: The Compilation on Hip-Hop Education, with Edmund Adjapong (2018)
- Ratchetdemic: Reimagining Academic Success (2021)
