= La the Darkman =

- Born: Lason Jackson; July 23, 1979 (age 46); New York City, New York
- Origin: Brooklyn, New York
- Genres: Hip hop
- Occupation: Rapper
- Years active: 1995–present
- Labels: Aphilliates Music Group; Embassy Entertainment; SRC Records; Republic Records; Universal Motown Records

Lason Jackson (born July 23, 1979), better known as La the Darkman, is a Wu-Tang Clan affiliated rapper and MC.

== Biography ==
Jackson was born in New York City, New York and grew up Crown Heights, Brooklyn with his brother William Jackson. He negotiated his first deal while finishing high school and was a protégé of the Wu-Tang Clan having grown particularly close with various members. Jackson later secured a distribution deal through Navarre Distribution, with whom he released his debut album Heist of the Century in 1998. He later toured with several singers and groups such as 50 Cent and the Wu-Tang Clan, as well as launching his own management company and clothing store. Jackson later relocated to Atlanta, Georgia, where he worked with Aphilliates Music Group and Embassy Entertainment, later negotiating label deals with both companies. He also worked in a business capacity for DJ Drama, setting up booking arrangements and endorsement deals. Jackson also executive produced the album Gangsta Grillz vol.1 and vol.2 which both albums hit #2 and #4 on the Billboard charts.

== Reception ==
The independently released Heist of the Century later peaked at 37 on Billboard's "R&B/Hip-Hop Albums" in May 1998.

Rapper/actor Drake mentioned Jackson during a MTV interview calling him one of the "Hottest MCs in the Game". Vibe praised Jackson's participation in the Uncontrolled Substance album, calling his overtures "seductive".

== Discography ==
=== Albums ===
- Heist of the Century (1998)
- WuTang Forever Ever (2025)

=== EP ===
- La Paraphernalia (2014)
- La Familia (2015)
- La Luminati (2016)
- Play by La Rules (2017)
- The Lavish vs The Savage (2017)

=== Mixtapes ===
- Return of the Darkman (with J-Love) (2006)
- Dead Presidents (with Willie the Kid) (2006)
- The Notorious LAD (with DJ Drama) (2008)
- Living Notoriously (with DJ Drama) (2009)
- Return of the Darkman, Part 2 (with J-Love) (2010)
- Embassy Invasion (with DJ Green Lantern) (2011)
- Living Notoriously Part 2 (2011)
- Midwest Kush: Pyrex Edition (2011)
- Midwest Kush: Pyrex Edition pt.2 (2012)
- Diary of a Playboy (2012)
- Diary of a Playboy 2 (2013)
- Paid in Full (2014)
- Paid in Full 2 (2016)
- Paid in Full 3 (2018)
- Wu La Familia (with DoloMite) (2020)

=== Singles ===
- I Want It All (1999)

=== Appearances ===
- Blah Blah Blah - Blahzay Blahzay (1996)
- Soul Assassins I - DJ Muggs (1997)
- Antidote - Deadly Venoms, Jamie Sommers (1998)
- So Good (So Dirty Remix) - Davina, Ol' Dirty Bastard (1998)
- N☆☆☆a Please - Ol Dirty Bastard (1999)
- Uncontrolled Substance - Inspectah Deck (1999)
- Beneath the Surface - GZA (1999)
- Ghost Dog: The Way of the Samurai (soundtrack) (1999)
- Bi-Polar - Vanilla Ice (2001)
- Saviorz Day - Sunz of Man (2003)
- The Greatest Story Never Told - Shyheim (2004)
- 4:21... The Day After - Method Man (2006)
- Gangsta Grillz Vol. 1 & 2 (Albums) - DJ Drama (2007) & (2009)
- Absolute Greatness LP & Never A Dull Moment LP - Willie the Kid
- The Lost Tapes - Ghostface Killah (2018)
- G.O.D.s Network - Reb7rth - Rakim (2024)
