= True Master =

American record producer (born 1969)

- Born: Derrick Harris; November 4, 1969 (age 57)
- Origin: Manhattan, New York City, U.S.
- Genre: Hip-hop
- Occupations: Record producer; rapper
- Years active: 1995–present

Derrick Harris (born November 4, 1969), better known by his stage name True Master, is an American hip-hop record producer and rapper, known for his affiliation with the Wu-Tang Clan.

True Master Albums
Title	Label	Date
Meta-Historical (with KRS-One)	Fat Beats	2010
Master Craftsman	True Master Music	2013
Divine Intervention (with Killah Priest)	True Master Music	2021

== Production credits ==
=== 1995 ===
- Guru presents: Ill Kid Records (1995)

07. True Master - "Who's the Truest"
09. Fabidden - "Hi Energy"

- Ol' Dirty Bastard - Return to the 36 Chambers: The Dirty Version (March 28, 1995)

04. "Brooklyn Zoo" (Co-produced by Ol' Dirty Bastard)

- Guru - Jazzmatazz, Vol. 2: The New Reality (July 18, 1995)

04. Looking Through the Darkness (featuring Mica Paris) [co-produced by Guru]

=== 1996 ===
- Ghostface Killah - Ironman (October 29, 1996)

09. "Fish" (featuring Cappadonna and Raekwon)

- Various artists - NFL Jams (Import) (November 26, 1996)

04. Method Man and Ricky Watters - "It's in the Game"

=== 1997 ===
- Various artists - Rhyme & Reason (soundtrack) (January 14, 1997)

07. The RZA - "Tragedy" (co-produced by RZA)

- Wu-Tang Clan - Wu-Tang Forever (June 3, 1997)

2-09. "The M.G.M."
2-13. "Heaterz" (featuring Cappadonna)

- Gravediggaz - The Pick, the Sickle and the Shovel (October 14, 1997)

03. "Da Bomb"
08. "Pit of Snakes" (co-produced by RZA)
12. "Hidden Emotions" (featuring True Master)

=== 1998 ===
- Cappadonna - The Pillage (March 24, 1998)

01. "Slang Editorial"
05. "Supa Ninjaz" (featuring U-God and Method Man)
07. "Splish Splash"
09. "Milk the Cow" (featuring Method Man)
10. "South of the Border"
12. "Dart Throwing" (featuring Raekwon and Method Man)

- Killah Priest - Heavy Mental (May 10, 1998)

02. "One Step" (featuring Tekitha)
05. "Cross My Heart" (featuring Inspectah Deck and GZA) {also on Caught Up (soundtrack)}
11. "If You Don't Know" (featuring Ol' Dirty Bastard)

- Sunz of Man - The Last Shall Be First (July 21, 1998)

04. "Flaming Swords"
11. "Collaboration '98" (featuring True Master & Method Man)
14. "For the Lust of Money/The Grandz"
17. "Next Up" (featuring Method Man)
18. "Intellectuals" (featuring Raekwon and U-God)

- Method Man - Tical 2000: Judgement Day (November 17, 1998)

04. "Dangerous Grounds" (featuring Street Life)
06. "Sweet Love" (featuring Cappadonna & Street Life)
08. "Torture"
16. "Party Crasher"

The version of this song that appears on the album is actually a remix by RZA. True Master provided the original beat, but it was later replaced. In an interview, Method Man expressed his wish to have the album released with the original True Master beat once all the copies of the first retail pressings were sold. The full instrumental of the original version of "Party Crasher" is available on a white label release of instrumentals from Tical 2000: Judgement Day.

17. "Grid Iron Rap" (featuring Street Life)
23. "Killin' Fields" (featuring Cho-Flo)

=== 1999 ===
- Ol' Dirty Bastard - Nigga Please (September 14, 1999)

12. "All in Together Now"

- Inspectah Deck - Uncontrolled Substance (October 5, 1999)

08. "Longevity" (featuring U-God)
11. "Lovin' You" (featuring La the Darkman)
13. "R.E.C. Room"

- U-God - Golden Arms Redemption (October 5, 1999)

02. "Turbulence"
04. "Dat's Gangsta"

=== 2000 ===
- Tony Touch - The Piece Maker (April 18, 2000)

05. Wu-Tang Clan - "The Abduction"

- Afu-Ra - Body of the Life Force (October 10, 2000)

04. "Big Acts, Little Acts" (featuring GZA)

=== 2001 ===
- Various artists - Oz (soundtrack) (January 9, 2001)

03. Wu-Tang Clan - "What You in Fo'"

- Cappadonna - The Yin and the Yang (April 3, 2001)

02. "Super Model" (featuring Ghostface Killah)

- Gravediggaz - Nightmare in A-Minor (April 9, 2002)

03. "Burn Baby Burn"
14. "Man Only Fears" (featuring ShoGun Assasson)
19. "Nightmare in A-Minor" (featuring 4th Disciple & Beretta 9)

- RZA - Digital Bullet (August 28, 2001)

09. "La Rhumba" (featuring Method Man, Killa Sin & Beretta 9)

- Wu-Tang Clan - Iron Flag (December 18, 2001)

07. "Ya'll Been Warned"

=== 2002 ===
- Afu-Ra - Life Force Radio (May 21, 2002)

16. "Dangerous Language" (featuring RZA)

- Busta Rhymes - It Ain't Safe No More (November 26, 2002)

18. "Till It's Gone"

=== 2003 ===
- 9th Prince - Granddaddy Flow (May 28, 2003)

11. "Slang Killaz" (featuring Killarmy)

- RZA - Birth of a Prince (October 7, 2003)

05. "Fast Cars" (featuring Ghostface Killah)

=== 2004 ===
- Ghostface Killah - The Pretty Toney Album (January 25, 2004)

02. "Biscuits" (featuring Trife)

- Masta Killa - No Said Date (June 6, 2004)

09. "Secret Rivals" (featuring Killah Priest & Method Man)
13. "Queen"
15. "Silverbacks" (featuring Inspectah Deck & GZA)

- Gravediggaz - 6 Feet Under

11. "Burn in Hell"

=== 2005 ===
- Black Rob - The Black Rob Report (October 18, 2005)

12. "You Know What" (featuring Louis Farrakhan)

=== 2007 ===
- Cilvaringz - I

12. "Damascus"

=== 2008 ===
- GZA - Pro Tools

3. "Alphabets"
9. "Paper Plates"

This track was wrongfully credited to The RZA, but was confirmed to be produced by True Master.

=== 2009 ===
- Raekwon - Only Built 4 Cuban Linx… Pt. II

17. "Fat Lady Sings"

This track was wrongfully credited to The RZA, but was confirmed to be produced by True Master.

=== 2010 ===
- KRS-One & True Master - Meta-Historical

entire album

- 9th Prince - One Man Army

13. "Prince of the Empire State"

=== 2013 ===
- Killah Priest - The Psychic World of Walter Reed

DISC 2

01. "The PWOWR (Problem Solver)" [co-produced by GZA & Shaolin Monks]

=== 2017 ===
- Masta Killa - Loyalty Is Royalty

08. "Skit"

2021

- Killah Priest & True Master - Divine Intervention

entire album

=== 2020 ===
- Bugsy Da God - Diary of an Underground Villain

07. "Juggernaut"

=== 2022 ===
- Bugsy Da God - Clash of the Superpowers (When Worlds Collide)

04. "Magnificent" (featuring Inspectah Deck & Dom Pachino)
07. "The Slugfest" (featuring Myalansky)
11. "8 Million Ways 2 Die"
14. "Paradigm Shift" (featuring True Master)

=== 2024 ===
- Bugsy Da God - Global Advocation

05. "Dropping Hammers"

=== 2025 ===
- Teraban - Hostile Takeover

07. "Full Clip" (Co-Produced by Mr. Tera)

== Appearances as a rapper ==
=== 1993 ===
- Guru presents Ill Kid Records (1993)

07. True Master - "Who's the Truest"

=== 1995 ===
- Guru - Jazzmatazz, Vol. 2: The New Reality (July 18, 1995)

08. "Medicine" (featuring Ini Kamoze and True Master)

=== 1997 ===
- Gravediggaz - The Pick, the Sickle and the Shovel October 14, 1997

12. "Hidden Emotions" (featuring True Master)

=== 1998 ===
- Sunz of Man - The Last Shall Be First July 21, 1998

11. "Collaboration '98" (featuring True Master and The Method Man)

=== 2000 ===
- Royal Fam - Yesterday, Today, Iz Tomorrow 2000

11. "Army Brickaid" (featuring Jahrule, ROC, Timbo King and True Master)

=== 2006 ===
- RZA - Afro Samurai OST

15. "Take Sword Part II" (featuring 60 Second Assassin)

=== 2008 ===
- GZA - Pro Tools

10. "Columbian Ties" (featuring True Master)

=== 2010 ===
- KRS-One & True Master - Meta-Historical

07. "Knowledge Reigns Supreme" (featuring True Master)
19. "He's Us" (featuring True Master)

2021

- Killah Priest & True Master - Divine Intervention

02. "Summer Snow" (featuring True Master)
04. "Asiatic Nobles" (featuring True Master)

05. "Cathedrals" (featuring True Master)

08. "Akashic Headress" (featuring True Master)

09. "Venus Succubus" (featuring True Master)
