= Beneath the Surface (GZA album) =

Studio album by GZA/Genius
- Released: June 29, 1999
- Recorded: August 1998 – March 1999
- Genre: Hip-hop
- Length: 46:00
- Label: MCA
- Producer: Arabian Knight; GZA; Inspectah Deck; John the Baptist; Mathematics; RZA

GZA/Genius chronology
Liquid Swords (1995)	Beneath the Surface (1999)	Legend of the Liquid Sword (2002)

Wu-Tang Clan solo chronology
Bobby Digital in Stereo (1998)	Beneath the Surface (1999)	Nigga Please (1999)

Professional ratings
Review scores
Source	Rating
AllMusic	4.5/5 stars
Christgau’s Consumer Guide	(1-star Honorable Mention)
NME	6/10
RapReviews	7/10
Spin	5/10
USA Today	3.5/4 stars

Beneath the Surface is the third solo studio album by American hip-hop musician and Wu-Tang Clan member GZA. The album was released on June 29, 1999, by MCA Records. It was executive produced by GZA and RZA, and co-executive produced by Arabian Knight.

== Track listing ==
Track listing information is taken from the official liner notes and AllMusic.

No.	Title	Writer(s)	Producer(s)	Length
1.	"Intro"	Angela Yee	GZA	1:16
2.	"Amplified Sample"	Gary Grice; Ronald Bean	Mathematics	3:31
3.	"Beneath the Surface" (featuring Killah Priest and Res)	Grice; Earl Randle; James Shaw; Jason Hunter; Lawrence Seymour; Santi White; Walter Reed; William Mitchell; Yvonne Mitchell	Inspectah Deck	4:29
4.	"Skit #1"	Yee	GZA	0:37
5.	"Skit #2"	Yee	GZA	0:31
6.	"Crash Your Crew" (featuring Ol' Dirty Bastard)	Grice; John Hitchmon; Russell Jones	John the Baptist	3:07
7.	"Breaker, Breaker"	Grice; Suleyman Ansari	Arabian Knight	3:38
8.	"High Price, Small Reward" (featuring Masta Killa)	Grice; Bean; Elgin Turner	Mathematics	1:43
9.	"Hip Hop Fury" (featuring Dreddy Kruger, Hell Razah, RZA, and Timbo King)	Grice; Ansari; Chron Smith; James Dockery; Robert Diggs; Timothy Drayton	Arabian Knight	3:44
10.	"Skit #3"	Yee	GZA	0:47
11.	"1112" (featuring Killah Priest, Masta Killa, and Njeri)	Grice; Diggs; Reed; Turner; Kristal Moss	RZA	4:18
12.	"Skit #4"	Yee	GZA	0:45
13.	"Victim" (featuring Joan Davis and Njeri)	Grice; Ansari; Moss	Arabian Knight	4:04
14.	"Publicity"	Grice; Bean	Mathematics	2:37
15.	"Feel Like an Enemy" (featuring Hell Razah, Killah Priest, Prodigal Sunn, and Trigga)	Reed; Smith; Lamar Ruff; Thomas Cassidy	Mathematics	3:12
16.	"Stringplay (Like This, Like That)" (featuring Method Man)	Grice; Ansari; Clifford Smith Jr.	Arabian Knight	3:18
17.	"Mic Trippin'"	Grice; Bean	Mathematics	2:59
18.	"Outro" (featuring La the Darkman and Timbo King)	Ansari; Drayton; Lason Jackson	Arabian Knight	1:34
Total length:				46:00

== Personnel ==
- Arabian Knight - Producer, Engineer, Executive Producer, Assistant Engineer, Mixing, Mixing Assistant
- Dragan "Chach" Cacinovic - Engineer
- Tom Coyne - Mastering
- Joan Davis - Performer
- GZA - Producer, Executive Producer
- Inspectah Deck - Producer
- John the Baptist - Producer
- Killah Priest - Vocals
- La the Darkman - Vocals
- Masta Killa - Vocals
- Mathematics - Producer
- Method Man - Vocals
- Hell Razah - Vocals
- Ol' Dirty Bastard - Performer
- RZA - Vocals, Executive Producer
- Trigga - Performer

== Charts ==
=== Weekly charts ===
Chart (1999)	Peak position
Australian Albums (ARIA)	98
US Billboard 200	9
US Top R&B/Hip-Hop Albums (Billboard)	1

=== Year-end charts ===
Chart (1999)	Position
US Top R&B/Hip-Hop Albums (Billboard)	84

== Certifications ==
Region	Certification	Certified units/sales
United States (RIAA)	Gold	500,000^{^}
^{^} Shipments figures based on certification alone.

== See also ==
- List of number-one R&B albums of 1999 (U.S.)
