= Heist of the Century (album) =

Studio album by La the Darkman
- Released: November 17, 1998
- Recorded: 1996–1998
- Genre: Hip hop
- Length: 71:30
- Label: Supreme Team
- Producer: Tarif "Supreme" (exec.); Carlos "Six July" Broady (also co-exec.); 4th Disciple; Havoc; DJ Muggs; RZA; Raekwon

Singles from Heist of the Century
- 1. "Spring Water/City Lights" Released: March 28, 1999; 2. "Heist of the Century" Released: December 31, 1999

Heist of the Century is the debut solo studio album by American rapper and Wu-Tang Clan affiliate La the Darkman, from Grand Rapids, Michigan. It was released on November 17, 1998, through Supreme Team Entertainment. The production was handled by Carlos "Six July" Broady, 4th Disciple, Havoc of Mobb Deep, RZA, Raekwon, and DJ Muggs of Cypress Hill. It features appearances by many Wu-Tang Clan members and affiliates such as Ghostface Killah, Masta Killa and U-God, among others.

== Critical reception ==
Professional ratings
Review scores
Source	Rating
The Source	3/5 stars

AllMusic wrote that "Heist of the Century is packed with streetworthy jeep-jams and mind-elevating lyrics, courtesy of some of hip-hop's brightest MC's." Marcus Reeves of The Source thought that most tracks on the album "drown in mid-tempo drums laced with nocturnal sound loops". He noted the rapper's "grim imagery" on some of the tracks, but thought that his delivery was average.

== Track listing ==
No.	Title	Writer(s)	Producer(s)	Length
1.	"Lucci"	Lason Jackson; Carlos Broady	Six July	5:29
2.	"Shine"	Jackson; Broady	Six July	4:43
3.	"City Lights"	Jackson; Kejuan Muchita	Havoc	4:01
4.	"What Thugs Do" (featuring DJ Rodgers & Puff)	Jackson; Broady	Six July	4:48
5.	"Heist of the Century" (featuring Killa Sin)	Jackson; Jeryl Grant; Lawrence Muggerud	DJ Muggs	3:23
6.	"Fifth Disciple"	Jackson; Selwyn Bougard	4th Disciple	1:05
7.	"Now Y"	Jackson; Broady	Six July	2:39
8.	"Spring Water" (featuring Raekwon)	Jackson; Broady; Cory Woods	Raekwon; Six July^{[a]}	3:32
9.	"4 Souls" (featuring Shotti Screwface)	Jackson; Broady; Kay Holebrook	Six July	5:26
10.	"Street Life" (featuring Tekitha)	Jackson; Broady; Tekitha Washington	Six July	3:43
11.	"Love" (featuring Maia Campbell)	Jackson; Bougard; Maia Campbell	4th Disciple	5:07
12.	"Figaro Chain" (featuring Havoc)	Jackson; Bougard; Muchita	Havoc	2:25
13.	"Polluted Wisdom"	Jackson; Robert Diggs	RZA	5:16
14.	"Gun Rule"	Jackson; Broady	Six July	4:51
15.	"Element of Surprise" (featuring Masta Killa & U-God)	Jackson; Elgin Turner; Lamont Hawkins	4th Disciple	3:06
16.	"Az the World Turnz" (featuring Raekwon)	Jackson; Bougard; Woods	4th Disciple	3:45
17.	"Wu-Blood Kin" (featuring Ghostface Killah & 12 O'Clock)	Jackson; Dennis Coles; Odion Turner	Six July	2:54
18.	"I Want It All"	Jackson; Broady	Six July	4:17
Total length:				1:10:30

Notes

- ^{^[a]} signifies a co-producer

== Charts ==
Chart (1998)	Peak position
US Top R&B/Hip-Hop Albums (Billboard)	37
US Heatseekers Albums (Billboard)	9
