= Bobby Digital in Stereo =

Studio album by RZA as Bobby Digital
- Released: November 24, 1998
- Recorded: 1998
- Genre: Hip-hop
- Length: 67:57
- Labels: Wu-Tang; Gee Street; V2; BMG
- Producers: RZA; Inspectah Deck; King Tech

RZA chronology
| Ooh I Love You Rakeem (1991) | Bobby Digital in Stereo (1998) | Ghost Dog: The Way of the Samurai (soundtrack) (1999) |

Wu-Tang Clan solo chronology
| Tical 2000: Judgement Day (1998) | Bobby Digital in Stereo (1998) | Beneath the Surface (1999) |

Professional ratings
Review scores
| Source | Rating |
|---|---|
| AllMusic | 4/5 stars |
| Entertainment Weekly | B |
| NME | 3/5 stars |
| Pitchfork Media | 2.9/10 |
| Rolling Stone | 4/5 stars |
| The Source | 3.5/5 stars |
| Stylus Magazine | (favorable) |

Bobby Digital in Stereo is the debut studio album by American rapper and producer RZA. It was released on November 24, 1998, and was certified Gold on February 5, 1999, by the Recording Industry Association of America (RIAA). It is an experimental album that is based on a story featuring him rhyming as a hedonistic, fun-loving alter-ego named Bobby Digital and showcasing a unique keyboard-driven sound (rather than samples) that RZA called digital orchestra, receiving mostly positive, though somewhat mixed, reviews.

== Background ==
He explained the origins of Bobby Digital, saying:

It came from a really good bag of weed one day, right? I was in my studio. My birth name is Bobby Diggs. So at the time, creatively, I felt like I was in a digital frame. I felt like I was in high-speed, where everything was digital, in numbers, mathematics. I said to myself at the same time that as Bobby Digital, I could use a character to describe some of the earlier days of my own life. Partying, bullshitting, going crazy, chasing women, taking drugs. At the same time, I would mix in my love for comic books. It was a mixture of fiction and reality together to make a character I thought would be entertaining, and I could utilize that character to get fans into me as an MC, as a lyricist, and also following the path of my life. It's like pre-RZA. It's what The RZA struggles not to be, in a way, you know what I mean?

== Music ==
=== Lyrical content ===
On the pseudonym and character of Bobby Digital, which dominated the album's lyrics, RZA later stated:

I had to live in a way that I don't really live...I got to dip my weed in honey, and I had mad bitches around me. I probably fucked with 50 bitches this year...women are queens. But if they don't know that themselves, Bobby will prey on them. He'll treat them like bitches if they don't realize that they're queens. I had to get Bobby out of me, or else I'd be emotionally unbalanced. Bobby Digital is just me feeling my nuts. RZA is my heart.

— RZA

=== Production ===
The sound of the album is largely keyboard-driven, but there are still samples. On the sound of Bobby Digital, RZA stated:

I learned how to play chords and progress the chords—I got together at least 16 or 17 different keyboards for this album. I always liked orchestras and strings, so I composed a digital orchestra.

— RZA

== Track listing ==
Track listing information is taken from the official liner notes. Tracks 1–17 are Bobby Digital songs, while tracks 18–21 are RZA songs.

In Stereo
| No. | Title | Writer(s) | Producer(s) | Length |
|---|---|---|---|---|
| 1. | "Intro" | Robert Diggs | RZA | 0:36 |
| 2. | "B.O.B.B.Y." | Robert Diggs | RZA | 5:23 |
| 3. | "Unspoken Word" | Robert Diggs | RZA | 4:44 |
| 4. | "Slow Grind African" | Robert Diggs | RZA | 1:02 |
| 5. | "Airwaves" | Robert Diggs | King Tech | 1:47 |
| 6. | "Love Jones" | Robert Diggs; Rodney Mathews | RZA | 4:31 |
| 7. | "N.Y.C. Everything" (feat. Method Man) | Robert Diggs; Clifford Smith | RZA | 4:17 |
| 8. | "Mantis" (feat. Masta Killa and Tekitha) | Robert Diggs; Elgin Turner; Tekitha Washington | RZA | 3:33 |
| 9. | "Slow Grind French" | Robert Diggs | RZA | 0:46 |
| 10. | "Holocaust (Silkworm)" (feat. Ghostface Killah, Holocaust, Dr. Doom and Ms. Roxy) | Robert Diggs; Anthony Brown; Dante Cunningham; Dennis Coles | RZA | 5:15 |
| 11. | "Terrorist" (feat. Killarmy and Black Knights) | Robert Diggs; Domingo Del Valle; Jeryl Grant | RZA | 3:25 |
| 12. | "Bobby Did It (Spanish Fly)" (feat. Ghostface Killah, Islord, Royal Fam, Jamie Sommers and Ndira) | Robert Diggs; Dennis Coles; Rodney Stevenson; Tonia Shivers; Timothy Drayton | RZA | 4:21 |
| 13. | "Handwriting On The Wall" (feat. Ms. Roxy and Ras Kass) | Robert Diggs | RZA | 1:39 |
| 14. | "Kiss Of A Black Widow" (feat. Ol' Dirty Bastard) | Robert Diggs; Adrian Utley; Beth Gibbons; Geoff Barrow; Jason Hunter; Russel Jones | Inspectah Deck | 2:47 |
| 15. | "Slow Grind Italian" | Robert Diggs | RZA | 1:01 |
| 16. | "My Lovin' Is Digi" (feat. Ms. Roxy) | Robert Diggs; Tekitha Washington; Roland Francis | RZA | 4:28 |
| 17. | "Domestic Violence" (feat. Jamie Sommers, Ms. Roxy and Tiffany) | Robert Diggs | RZA | 5:21 |
| 18. | "Project Talk" (feat. Baretta Nine) | Robert Diggs | RZA | 1:46 |
| 19. | "Lab Drunk" | Robert Diggs | RZA | 3:34 |
| 20. | "Fuck What You Think" (feat. 9th Prince and Islord of Killarmy) | Robert Diggs; Rodney Stevenson; Terrance Hamlin | RZA | 3:12 |
| 21. | "Daily Routine" (feat. Baretta Nine of Killarmy) | Robert Diggs; Samuel Murray | RZA | 4:23 |
| Total length: | | | | 67:51 |

In Stereo – Japanese release
| No. | Title | Writer(s) | Producer(s) | Length |
|---|---|---|---|---|
| 1. | "B.O.B.B.Y." | Robert Diggs | RZA | 5:50 |
| 2. | "Unspoken Word" | Robert Diggs | RZA | 4:46 |
| 3. | "Airwaves" | Robert Diggs | King Tech | 1:51 |
| 4. | "Love Jones" (with Angel Cake) | Robert Diggs; Rodney Mathews | RZA | 4:35 |
| 5. | "N.Y.C. Everything" (with Method Man) | Robert Diggs; Clifford Smith | RZA | 4:23 |
| 6. | "Mantis" (with Masta Killa and Tekitha) | Robert Diggs; Elgin Turner; Tekitha Washington | RZA | 3:38 |
| 7. | "Holocaust (Silkworm)" (with Ghostface Killah, Holocaust, Dr. Doom and Ms. Roxy) | Robert Diggs; Anthony Brown; Dante Cunningham; Dennis Coles | RZA | 5:16 |
| 8. | "Terrorist" (Killarmy and Black Knights) | Robert Diggs; Domingo Del Valle; Jeryl Grant | RZA | 4:10 |
| 9. | "Bobby Did It (Spanish Fly)" (with Ghostface Killah, Islord, Royal Fam, Jamie Sommers and Ndira) | Robert Diggs; Dennis Coles; Rodney Stevenson; Tonia Shivers; Timothy Drayton | RZA | 4:24 |
| 10. | "Kiss Of A Black Widow" (with Wu-Tang Clan and Angel Cake) | Robert Diggs; Adrian Utley; Beth Gibbons; Geoff Barrow; Jason Hunter; Russel Jones | Inspectah Deck | 2:50 |
| 11. | "Do You Here The Bells (9 Minute Free Style)" | Robert Diggs | RZA | 11:26 |
| 12. | "Project Talk" (featuring Baretta Nine) | Robert Diggs | RZA | 1:47 |
| 13. | "Lab Drunk" | Robert Diggs | RZA | 4:18 |
| 14. | "Fuck What You Think" (with 9th Prince and Islord of Killarmy) | Robert Diggs; Rodney Stevenson; Terrance Hamlin | RZA | 3:13 |
| 15. | "Daily Routine" (with Baretta Nine of Killarmy) | Robert Diggs; Samuel Murray | RZA | 4:23 |
| 16. | "Domestic Violence" (with U-God, Jamie Sommers, Ms. Roxy and Tiffany) | Robert Diggs | RZA | 5:19 |
| Total length: | | | | 72:09 |

Notes

- "Intro" contains vocals by Frank "Foxy" Niedlich.
- "Slow Grind African" contains vocals by Lisa I'Anson.
- "Love Jones" is erroneously credited to King Tech, who produced "Airwaves".
- "Slow Grind French" contains vocals by Victorie Heathcole.
- "Kiss Of A Black Widow" contains raps by Ol' Dirty Bastard, not the entire Wu-Tang Clan.
- "Slow Grind Italian" contains vocals by Lorenza Calamandrei.
- "Do You Here The Bells" is listed as Special Bonus Track For Japan Only.

Sample list

- "Love Jones" contains a sample of "Star Children" performed by Mighty Ryeders.
- "Kiss Of A Black Widow" contains a sample of "Over" performed by Portishead.
- "My Lovin' Is Digi" contains a sample of "It Ain't Easy" performed by Syl Johnson.

== Personnel ==
- Barney Chase – Engineer, Mixing
- Gabe Chiesa – Engineer
- Tom Coyne – Mastering
- Inspectah – Producer
- King Tech – Producer, Engineer, Mixing
- Nolan "Dr. No" Moffitte – Engineer, Mixing
- Carl Nappa – Mixing
- Tony Prendatt – Engineer, Mixing
- RZA – Producer, Engineer, Mixing
- Miles Showell – Mastering, Assembly
- Bill Sienkiewicz – Illustration

== Charts ==
=== Weekly charts ===
| Chart (1998) | Peak position |
|---|---|
| Australian Albums (ARIA) | 54 |
| US Billboard 200 | 16 |
| US Top R&B/Hip-Hop Albums (Billboard) | 3 |

=== Year-end charts ===
| Chart (1999) | Position |
|---|---|
| US Top R&B/Hip-Hop Albums (Billboard) | 77 |

== Certifications ==
| Region | Certification | Certified units/sales |
|---|---|---|
| Canada (Music Canada) | Gold | 50,000^{^} |
| United States (RIAA) | Gold | 500,000^{^} |
^{^} Shipments figures based on certification alone.
