= Uncontrolled Substance =

Studio album by Inspectah Deck
- Released: October 5, 1999
- Recorded: 1997–1998
- Genre: Hip-hop
- Length: 65:56
- Label: Loud
- Producers: 4th Disciple; The Blaquesmiths; Inspectah Deck; Mathematics; Pete Rock; RZA; True Master; V.I.C.

Inspectah Deck chronology
Uncontrolled Substance (1999)	The Movement (2003)

Wu-Tang Clan solo chronology
Nigga Please (1999)	Uncontrolled Substance (1999)	Golden Arms Redemption (1999)

Professional ratings
Review scores
Source	Rating
AllMusic	4.5/5 stars
The A.V. Club	(favorable)
Los Angeles Times	2.5/4 stars
Q	3/5 stars
RapReviews	7/10
Rolling Stone	3/5 stars
The Source	3.5/5 stars
Spin	7/10
Vibe	(favorable)
The Village Voice	(2-star Honorable Mention)

Uncontrolled Substance is the debut solo album by American rapper and Wu-Tang Clan member Inspectah Deck. The album was released on October 5, 1999, under Loud Records. Originally slated for release in 1995, the record was postponed after a flood destroyed over 100 beats in RZA's basement, including his original productions for the album. Eventually released four years later, Uncontrolled Substance received mostly positive reviews, and is Inspectah Deck's most critically acclaimed and most commercially successful album to date. The album features Wu-Tang Clan members U-God and Masta Killa, and appearances from lesser-known affiliates Street Life, Killa Sin, and La the Darkman. A music video was made for the songs "Word on the Street" directed by Gregory Dark & "Show 'N' Prove" directed by Joseph Kahn. The album's liner notes state that it is dedicated to Inspectah Deck's late father, Frank Hunter.

== Commercial performance ==
The album reached the positions no. 19 and no. 3 on the Billboard 200 and the Top R&B/Hip-Hop Albums charts, respectively. According to Inspectah Deck himself, the album managed to reach gold-level sales.

== Track listing ==
No.	Title	Writer(s)	Producer(s)	Length
1.	"Intro"	Jason Richard Hunter	Inspectah Deck	2:01
2.	"Movas & Shakers"	Hunter	RZA	4:33
3.	"9th Chamber" (featuring La the Darkman, Kinetic 9, Killa Sin & Street Life)	Hunter; Samuel Craig Murray; Jeryl Grant; Patrick Charles	4th Disciple	2:51
4.	"Uncontrolled Substance" (featuring Shadii)	Hunter; Robert Fitzgerald Diggs; Ronald Maurice Bean	RZA; Mathematics	5:00
5.	"Femme Fatale"	Hunter	Inspectah Deck	3:06
6.	"The Grand Prix" (featuring U-God & Street Life)	Hunter; Lamont Jody Hawkins; Charles	4th Disciple	4:43
7.	"Forget Me Not"	Hunter	The Mighty V.I.C.	3:50
8.	"Longevity" (featuring U-God)	Hunter; Hawkins	True Master	4:40
9.	"Word on the Street"	Hunter	Inspectah Deck	3:44
10.	"Elevation"	Hunter	Inspectah Deck	3:15
11.	"Lovin You" (featuring La the Darkman)	Hunter; Derrick Harris; Lason Jackson	True Master	2:36
12.	"Trouble Man" (featuring Vinia Mojica)	Hunter	Pete Rock	5:05
13.	"R.E.C. Room"	Hunter	True Master	3:16
14.	"Friction" (featuring Masta Killa)	Hunter; Jamel Irief	RZA	3:36
15.	"Hyperdermix"	Hunter	Inspectah Deck	4:52
16.	"Show N Prove"	Hunter	The Blaquesmiths	4:08
17.	"The Cause" (featuring Street Life)	Hunter; Charles	Inspectah Deck	4:35
Total length:				65:56

== Personnel ==
- The RZA – executive producer, producer
- Mitchell "Divine" Diggs – executive producer, executive supervisor
- Jeff Trotter – A&R direction
- Ashuanna Ayers – project coordinator
- Che Harris – A&R coordinator
- Charlene Thomas – A&R coordinator
- Chris Gehringer – mastering, recording
- Maurice Whitaker – creative direction, design, layout
- Piotr Sikora – photography
- Inspectah Deck – producer, mixing
- Allah Mathematics – producer
- Nolan Moffitte – recording, mixing
- 4th Disciple – producer
- Djini Brown – recording, mixing
- V.I.C. – producer, mixing
- Gabe Chiesa – recording
- True Master – producer
- Tony Black – mixing, recording
- Pete Rock – producer, mixing
- Brian Stanley – recording
- Large Professor – mixing
- The Blaquesmiths – producers
- Chris "CHAMP" Champions – recording

== Charts ==
Chart (1999)	Peak position
UK R&B Albums (Official Charts)	22
US Billboard 200	19
US Top R&B/Hip-Hop Albums (Billboard)	3
