= Golden Arms Redemption =

Studio album by U-God
- Released: October 19, 1999
- Studios: Studios South (Miami); Quad (New York City); Studio 57 (New York City); Unique (New York City); 36 Chambers (New York City)
- Genre: Hip-hop
- Length: 62:48
- Labels: Wu-Tang; Priority
- Producers: U-God (exec.); RZA (also exec.); Bink!; Hak Da Navigator; Homicide; Inspectah Deck; John The Baptist; Omonte "O" Ward; True Master

U-God chronology
Golden Arms Redemption (1999)	UGodz-Illa Presents: The Hillside Scramblers (2004)

Wu-Tang Clan solo chronology
Uncontrolled Substance (1999)	Golden Arms Redemption (1999)	Immobilarity (1999)

Golden Arms Redemption is the debut solo studio album by American rapper U-God. It was released on October 19, 1999, via Wu-Tang Records and Priority Records.

== Background ==
The recording sessions took place at Quad Recording Studios, at Studio 57, at Unique Recording Studios and at 36 Chambers in New York City, and at Studios South in Miami. The production was handled by True Master, Inspectah Deck, Homicide, Bink!, Hak Da Navigator, John The Baptist, Omonte "O" Ward, and RZA, who also served as executive producer together with U-God. It features guest appearances from Leatha Face, Hell Razah, Inspectah Deck, Method Man, Raekwon and Drey Wit Da Y. The album peaked at number 58 on the Billboard 200 and number 15 on the Top R&B/Hip-Hop Albums in the United States. It spawned two singles: "Bizarre" and "Dat's Gangsta". Its lead single reached number seven on the Hot Rap Songs. The song "Rumble" was used as the main song for the video game Wu-Tang: Shaolin Style.

== Critical reception ==
Professional ratings
Review scores
Source	Rating
AllMusic	3/5 stars
Robert Christgau	(2-star Honorable Mention)
NME	3.5/5 stars

The Independent noted that, "with RZA overseeing production, and Raekwon, Method Man and Inspectah Deck chipping in phrases here and there, the album follows the Wu-Tang tradition of impassioned invective, mangled metaphor and its own internal logic."

== Track listing ==
Golden Arms Redemption track listing
No.	Title	Writer(s)	Producer(s)	Length
1.	"Enter U-God"	Lamont Jody Hawkins; Robert Fitzgerald Diggs	RZA	1:48
2.	"Turbulence"	Hawkins; Derrick Harris	True Master	3:09
3.	"Glide" (featuring Leathaface and Drey Wit Da Y)	Hawkins; Orlando Irizarry; Jason Richard Hunter	Inspectah Deck	6:11
4.	"Dat's Gangsta"	Hawkins; Harris	True Master	4:23
5.	"Soul Dazzle"	Hawkins	Homicide	3:53
6.	"Bizarre"	Hawkins; Roosevelt Harrell III; Marvin Gaye	Bink!	4:30
7.	"Rumble" (featuring Leathaface, Inspectah Deck and Method Man)	Hawkins; Irizarry; Hunter; Clifford Smith, Jr.; Harris	True Master	4:33
8.	"Pleasure or Pain" (featuring Hell Razah)	Hawkins; Chron Smith; Hakim Ali	Hak Da Navigator	4:26
9.	"Stay in Your Lane"	Hawkins; Diggs	RZA	4:03
10.	"Shell Shock" (featuring Leathaface, Raekwon and Hell Razah)	Hawkins; Irizarry; Corey Woods; Smith; Ali	Hak Da Navigator	5:12
11.	"Lay Down"	Hawkins; John Hitchman, Jr.	John Da Baptist	3:46
12.	"Hungry"	Hawkins; Omonte Ward	Omonte "O" Ward	4:56
13.	"Turbo Charge"	Hawkins; Diggs	RZA	3:01
14.	"Knockin At Your Door" (featuring Leathaface)	Hawkins; Irizarry; Hitchman, Jr.	John Da Baptist	3:29
15.	"Night the City Cried"	Hawkins	Homicide	5:28
Total length:				62:48

Sample credits

- Track 6 contains excerpts from "Far Cry" by Marvin Gaye.

== Personnel ==
- Lamont "U-God" Hawkins – main artist, executive producer, sleeve notes
- Orlando "Leatha Face" Irizarry – featured artist (tracks: 3, 7, 10, 14)
- Drey Wit Da Y – additional vocals (track 3)
- Jason "Inspectah Deck" Hunter – featured artist (track 7), producer (track 3)
- Clifford "Method Man" Smith – featured artist (track 7)
- Chron "Hell Razah" Smith – featured artist (tracks: 8, 10)
- Corey "Raekwon" Woods – featured artist (track 10)
- Robert "RZA" Diggs – producer (tracks: 1, 9, 13), recording (track 9), executive producer
- Derek "True Master" Harris – producer (tracks: 2, 4, 7)
- A. "Homocide" Mercado – producer (tracks: 5, 15)
- Roosevelt "Bink!" Harrell III – producer (track 6)
- Hakim "Hak Da Navigator" Ali – producer (tracks: 8, 10)
- John "The Baptist" Hitchmon – producer (tracks: 11, 14)
- Omonte "O" Ward – producer (track 12)
- Pete Kessler – recording (track 1)
- Carlos Bess – mixing (tracks: 2, 9, 12, 13)
- Andi Carr – recording (tracks: 2, 4, 8, 11, 12, 14)
- Arty Sky – recording (tracks: 3, 5, 13, 15), mixing (tracks: 3, 5, 8, 10, 11, 14)
- Jose "Choco" Reynoso – mixing (tracks: 4, 7, 15)
- Kenny Ortiz – recording (tracks: 6, 7, 10), mixing (track 6)
- Chris Athens – mastering
- John "Mook" Gibbons – co-executive producer
- Michele "Michou" Robinson – art direction
- Clay McBride – photography
- Jay "Mighty Healthy" Quinn – production coordinator
- Tamika Layton – project coordinator

== Charts ==
Chart (1999)	Peak position
US Billboard 200	58
US Top R&B/Hip-Hop Albums (Billboard)	15
