= GZA =

American rapper (born 1966)

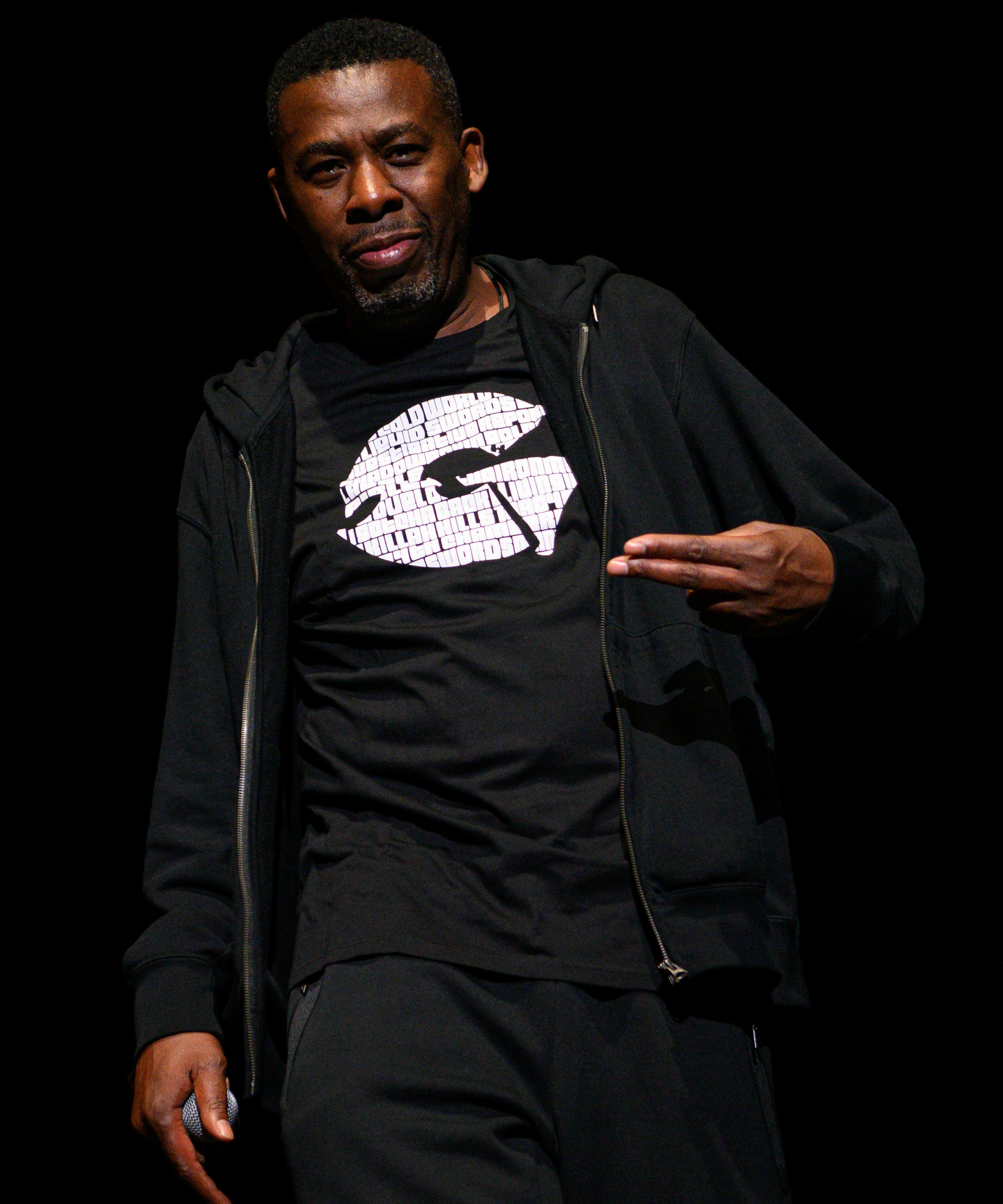
- GZA in 2022

Background information
- Also known as: The Genius
- Born: Gary Eldridge Grice; August 22, 1966 (age 59); New York City, New York, U.S.
- Genres: East Coast hip-hop
- Occupation: Rapper
- Years active: 1991–present
- Labels: Cold Chillin' Records; Loud Records; Geffen Records; MCA Records; Babygrande Records
- Member of: Wu-Tang Clan

Gary Eldridge Grice (born August 22, 1966), better known by his stage names GZA (/ˈdʒɪzə/ JIZ-ə) and the Genius, is an American rapper. A founding member of the hip-hop group Wu-Tang Clan, GZA is the group's "spiritual head", being both the first member in the group to receive a record deal and being the oldest member. He has appeared on his fellow Wu-Tang members' solo projects, and has maintained a successful solo career starting with his second album Liquid Swords (1995).

His lyrical style often eschews typical hip-hop themes in favor of science and philosophy. An analysis of GZA's lyrics found that he has one of the largest vocabularies in popular hip-hop music, despite dropping out of high school during the 10th grade. He teamed up with an education group to promote science education in New York City through hip-hop. His style has been characterized as "armed with sharp metaphors and a smooth flow".

== Early life ==
GZA was born Gary Grice in Brooklyn, New York, on August 22, 1966. He developed an interest in hip-hop by attending block parties as a child in the early 1970s, becoming involved in breakdance, graffiti, and DJing. Early on he developed an interest in writing, studying Mother Goose and nursery rhyme. In 1974–1976, before moving from Brooklyn to Staten Island, he listened to The Last Poets; however, he was attracted by profanity rather than content, and didn't understand the underlying messages until many years later. The Last Poets, as well as songs by The Isley Brothers, the Commodores, and the O'Jays were a big part of his life growing up, especially regarding the tone and cadence of speech. Later, he began to listen to hip-hop and R&B, example being Secret Weapon and Grandmaster Flash and the Furious Five. In 1982, Grice dropped out of high school in the tenth grade.

He formed a three-man group with his cousins, Robert Diggs and Russell Jones, who later was known as RZA and Ol' Dirty Bastard. At the time he didn't like the sound of his voice. In the group, FOI: Force of the Imperial Master, and later All in Together, the trio rapped and DJed, switching names and performing local shows. They lived in different boroughs; GZA and Ol' Dirty traveled from Brooklyn to Staten Island to meet with their cousin RZA. Then they went to places in New York City challenging other MCs to battles. GZA left school in the 10th grade, but enjoyed studying science as he developed his skills as a lyricist.

After several years, GZA was signed to Cold Chillin' Records as a solo artist under the name The Genius. He released his debut album, Words from the Genius (1991), produced mostly by Easy Mo Bee, but it failed to sell due to lack of promotion. That combined with his rocky experience on tour, caused GZA to be fed up and he asked to be released from the label. The album's beats are similar to the classic boom-bap sound of the early 1990s, while the lyricism subject is the everyday situations of an individual living in the parts of New York. At the time he worked as a bicycle messenger.

== Wu-Tang Clan ==
In 1992, GZA joined the Wu-Tang Clan, a group of nine, formed by his cousin RZA. GZA had some high-profile appearances on the group's debut album, Enter the Wu-Tang (36 Chambers) (1993), including a solo track, "Clan in da Front". Combined with appearances on other Clan members' albums including Return to the 36 Chambers: The Dirty Version (1995) and Only Built 4 Cuban Linx... (1995) that brought him much recognition. According to Method Man, "we form like Voltron and GZA happens to be the head".

== Solo career ==
=== 1995–1999: Liquid Swords, Beneath the Surface ===
The guest appearances were followed in 1995 by GZA's second studio album, Liquid Swords, produced and recorded entirely in the basement studio by RZA, with the participation of all original Clan members. It was released on November 7 by Geffen Records. The album's complex composition included dialogue sampled from the film Shogun Assassin. The album was met with positive reviews and sold well. It is considered to be one of the best albums from the Wu-Tang camp. It peaked at the No. 9 spot on the Billboard 200 chart and No. 2 on the Top R&B/Hip Hop Albums chart. On October 8, 2015, the Recording Industry Association of America announced that the album had earned a Platinum certification for having sold more than 1 million copies. It became the first Wu-Tang-related album to get certified since 2004, when Method Man and Ghostface Killah both earned plaques. In addition, he directed music videos for four album singles.

After appearing on the Wu-Tang Clan's second album, Wu-Tang Forever (1997), his third studio album Beneath the Surface was released by MCA Records in 1999. The album and its singles "Crash Your Crew" and "Breaker, Breaker" met with critical acclaim. The album earned a Gold certification by RIAA, peaked at No. 9 on the Billboard 200 chart, and topped the Top R&B/Hip Hop Albums chart.

=== 2000–2009: Legend of the Liquid Sword, Pro Tools ===
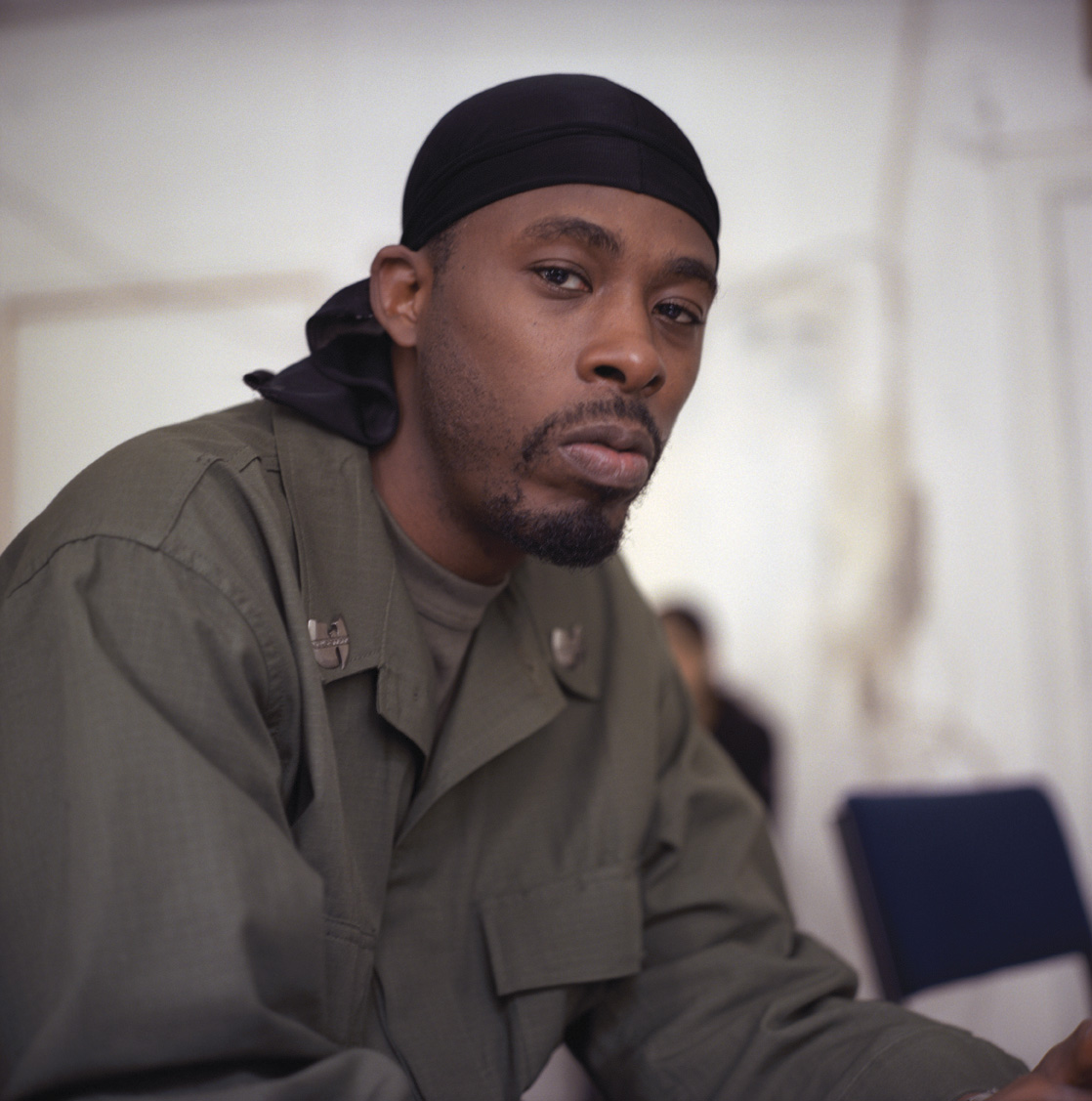
GZA in March 2000

In 2000 the single "Ich lebe für Hip Hop" was released with DJ Tomekk and placed 11th in the German charts. In 2002, a sequel to his second solo album was released, Legend of the Liquid Sword. It was well received by critics, yet did not sell well and failed to go Gold. GZA spent 2004 touring, both solo and with the Clan, and made an appearance with RZA in Jim Jarmusch's film Coffee and Cigarettes, opposite Bill Murray. The two also appeared on the Chappelle Show's skits "Wu Tang Financial" and "Racial Draft".

In 2005, GZA and DJ Muggs (the producer for hip-hop group Cypress Hill) released collaboration album Grandmasters. Muggs provided all the production for the album, which saw GZA using chess as a metaphor for the rap game, with most of the songs having a chess-themed title.

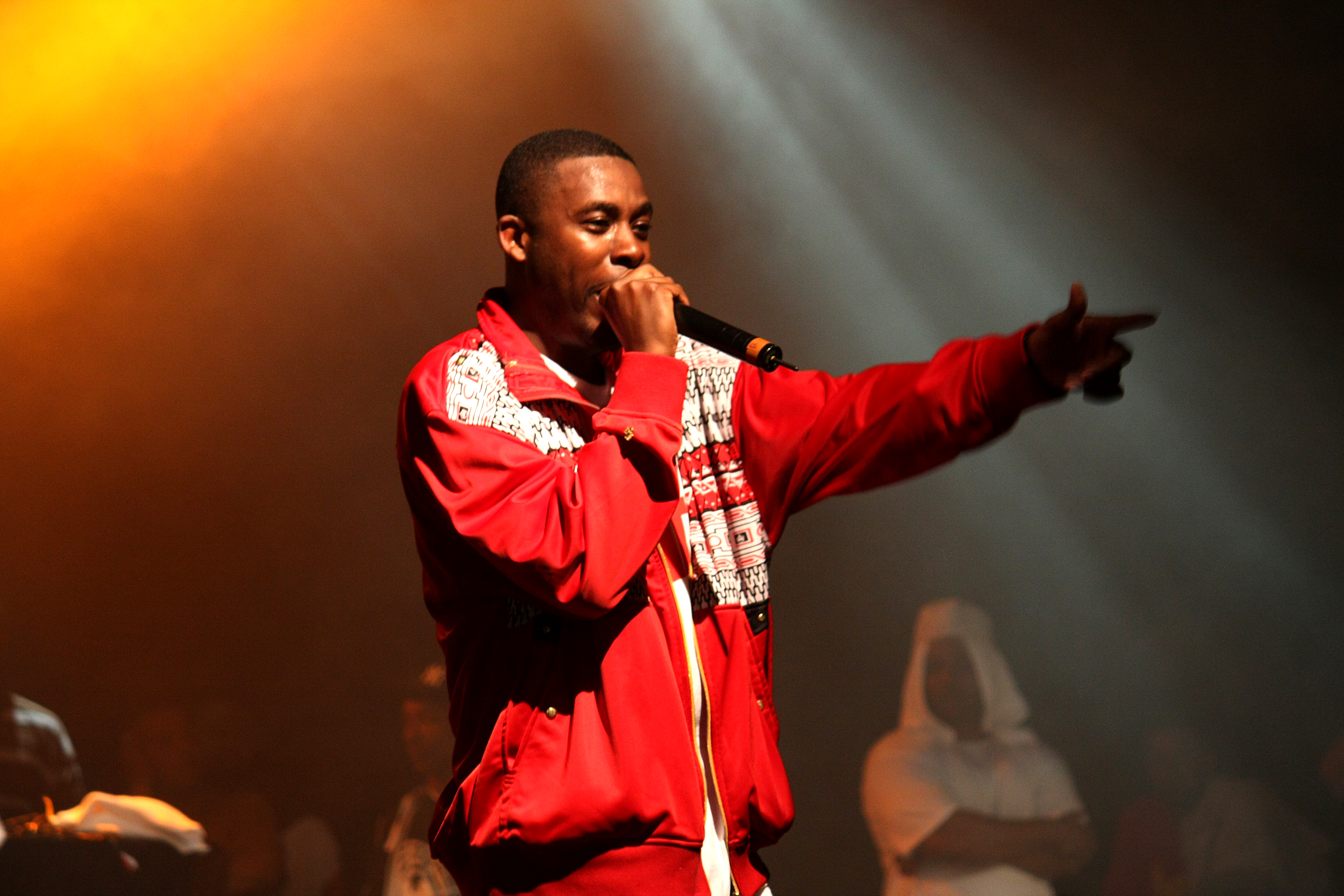
GZA performing at Paid Dues at the Nokia Theatre Times Square in Downtown Manhattan, June 2008

In the summer of 2008, his fifth solo studio album Pro Tools was released by Babygrande Records. It featured production from Black Milk and Jay "Waxxx" Garfield, RZA, Mathematics and True Master. A very controversial song on the album was entitled "Paper Plate", a smooth flowing response aimed at rival rapper 50 Cent. After the release, GZA toured various parts of Europe on a "Liquid Swords Tour", where he performed songs from Liquid Swords as well as Pro Tools. He later toured parts of the US.

=== 2010–present: Dark Matter ===
In 2010, he spoke at Harvard University in Cambridge, Massachusetts and since then has visited, among others, MIT, Oxford, USC, NYU, Cornell, where he met with scientists such as David Kaiser and Sallie W. Chisholm to seek inspiration. In 2012, he talked "hip-hop and science" with Neil deGrasse Tyson.

Wanting to improve science education in New York City and in other places in late 2012, with the assistance of Columbia University's professor Christopher Emdin and website Rap Genius, he began work on a pilot program called Science Genius B.A.T.T.L.E.S. (Bringing Attention to Transforming, Teaching and Learning Science). This initiative motivates young high school students, especially African-American and Latino students, who together make up 70 percent of New York City's student body, to learn science through hip-hop, creating scientific raps and engaging in a rap competition.

In the meantime, he continued to work on a related, new studio album called Dark Matter, which is based on a journey through spacetime, universe and physics. In late 2015, GZA canceled European tour dates to focus on working on the album with composer Vangelis. It is planned to be one in a series of albums related to Earth, with the following conceived around oceans. GZA hinted that the albums will be without parental advisory, profanity and nudity.

In February 2015, GZA released a single "The Mexican" (a cover of Babe Ruth's song), featuring guitarist Tom Morello and singer Kara Lane. They performed the song live along with The Roots on The Tonight Show Starring Jimmy Fallon. On June 30, 2016, he released a new space-themed track, "The Spark", produced by Paul Ryder, for NASA's project "Destination: Jupiter", in celebration of the agency's ongoing Juno Mission. In 2020, GZA provided a voice role in Netflix's Kipo and the Age of Wonderbeasts as Bad Billions, and contributed a song to the series.

== Personal life ==
GZA has been noted for having an interest in quantum physics and has given lectures at New York University in Manhattan and at MIT in Cambridge, Massachusetts. He is a vegan and advocates for raw veganism. He has called soul food the “slave man’s diet”.

== Discography ==
=== Studio albums ===
- Words from the Genius (1991)
- Liquid Swords (1995)
- Beneath the Surface (1999)
- Legend of the Liquid Sword (2002)
- Pro Tools (2008)
- Dark Matter (TBA)

=== Collaboration albums ===
- GrandMasters with DJ Muggs (2005)
