= Raekwon discography =

Discography of American rapper

- Studio albums: 8
- Compilation albums: 1
- Singles: 11
- Mixtapes: 12
- Featured singles: 12

This is the discography of American rapper Raekwon.

== Albums ==
=== Studio albums ===
List of studio albums, with selected chart positions, sales figures and certifications
Year	Title	Chart positions			Certifications
Year	Title	US	US R&B/HH	US Rap	Certifications
1995	Only Built 4 Cuban Linx...: Released: August 1, 1995; Label: Loud/RCA/BMG Records	4	2	*	RIAA: Platinum; BPI: Silver
1999	Immobilarity: Released: November 16, 1999; Label: Loud/Columbia/SME Records	9	2	*	RIAA: Gold
2003	The Lex Diamond Story: Released: December 16, 2003; Label: Universal	102	18	*	
2009	Only Built 4 Cuban Linx… Pt. II: Released: September 8, 2009; Label: Ice H2O/EMI	4	2	2	
2011	Shaolin vs. Wu-Tang: Released: March 8, 2011; Label: Ice H2O/EMI	12	3	2	
2015	Fly International Luxurious Art: Released: April 28, 2015; Label: Ice H2O/Caroline	60	7	6	
2017	The Wild: Released: March 24, 2017; Label: Ice H2O/Empire	88	41	—	
2025	The Emperor's New Clothes: Released: July 18, 2025; Label: Ice H2O/Mass Appeal	—	—	—	

=== Collaboration albums ===
List of collaboration albums, with selected chart positions
Year	Title	Chart positions			Certifications
Year	Title	US	USR&B/HH	US Rap	Certifications
2010	Wu-Massacre (with Method Man and Ghostface Killah): Released: March 30, 2010; Label: Def Jam	12	6	2	

=== Mixtapes ===
Title	Details
The Chef vs. The Butcher (with CHOPS)	Released: June 28, 2004; Label: Vocab Records; Formats: digital download
The Vatican Mixtape Vol. 1 (Hosted by DJ Riddler)	Released: March 10, 2006; Label: Self-released; Format: CD, Digital download
The Vatican Mixtape Vol. 2 The DaVinci Code	Released: July 11, 2006; Label: Self-released; Format: CD, Digital download
Heroin Only (Hosted by DJ Thoro)	Released: November 10, 2006; Label: Self-released; Format: Digital download
The Vatican Mixtape Vol. 3 House of Wax	Released: September 25, 2007; Label: Self-released; Format: CD, Digital download
Chef Cocaine Cooked	Released: October 7, 2008; Label: Phantom Sound & Vision; Format: CD
Cuban Revolution	Released: August 17, 2009; Label: Self-released; Format: Digital download
Blood on Chef's Apron (Hosted by DJ Absolut)	Released: May 6, 2009; Label: Self-released; Format: Digital download
Staten Go Hard Vol. 1 (Hosted by Brinks Boys)	Released: September 28, 2009; Label: Self-released; Format: Digital download
Coke Up in da Dollar Bill (Hosted by DJ Whoo Kid & DJ Scream)	Released: January 1, 2010; Label: Self-released; Format: CD, Digital download
The Vatican Mixtape Vol. 4 (Hosted by DJ Riddler)	Released: March 25, 2010; Label: Self-released; Format: Digital download
Cocainism Vol. 2 (Hosted by DJ Riddler)	Released: May 28, 2010; Label: Self-released; Format: Digital download
Trouble Makers (Hosted by DJ Love Killed Kurt)	Released: February 5, 2011; Label: Self-released; Format: Digital download
Unexpected Victory	Released: January 1, 2012; Label: Self-released; Format: CD, Digital download
Lost Jewlry	Released: January 15, 2013; Label: Self-released; Format: CD, Digital download
We Wanna Thank You	Released: October 31, 2014; Label: Self-released; Format: CD, Digital download

=== Compilation albums ===
List of albums, with year released
Title	Details
The Babygrande Recordings	Released: September 1, 2009; Label: Babygrande; Formats: CD, digital download

== Extended plays ==
Title	Details
Dope on the Table	Released: December 1, 2011; Label: Ice H2O; Format: Digital download

== Singles ==
=== As lead artist ===
Year	Title	Chart positions			Album
Year	Title	US	US R&B/HH	US Rap	Album
1994	"Heaven & Hell" (featuring Ghostface Killah)	—	— (Note: "Heaven & Hell" did not enter the R&B/Hip-Hop Songs chart, but peaked at number one on the Bubbling Under R&B/Hip-Hop Songs chart, which acts as a 25-song extension to the R&B/Hip-Hop Songs chart.)	32	Fresh (Soundtrack) / Only Built 4 Cuban Linx...
1995	"Incarcerated Scarfaces" / "Ice Cream" (featuring Ghostface Killah, Method Man, and Cappadonna)	37	37	5	Only Built 4 Cuban Linx...
1995	"Glaciers of Ice" (featuring Ghostface Killah, Masta Killa, and Blue Raspberry) / "Criminology" (featuring Ghostface Killah)	43	32	5	Only Built 4 Cuban Linx...
1999	"Live from New York"	—	—	30	Immobiliarity
2000	"100 Rounds"				Immobiliarity
2003	"Smith Bros."	—	— (Note: "Smith Bros." did not enter the R&B/Hip-Hop Songs chart, but peaked at number 15 on the Bubbling Under R&B/Hip-Hop Songs chart, which acts as a 25-song extension to the R&B/Hip-Hop Songs chart.)	—	The Lex Diamond Story
2004	"The Hood" (featuring Tiffany Villarreal)	—	—	—	The Lex Diamond Story
2009	"New Wu" (featuring Ghostface Killah and Method Man)	—	—	—	Only Built 4 Cuban Linx... Part II
2009	"House of Flying Daggers" (featuring GZA, Method Man, Inspectah Deck, Ghostface Killah)	—	—	—	Only Built 4 Cuban Linx... Part II
2009	"Catalina" (featuring Lyfe Jennings)	—	—	—	Only Built 4 Cuban Linx... Part II
2010	"Our Dreams" (with Ghostface Killah and Method Man)	—	—	—	Wu-Massacre
2010	"Mef vs. Chef 2" (with Ghostface Killah and Method Man)	—	—	—	Wu-Massacre
2010	"Miranda" (with Ghostface Killah and Method Man)	—	—	—	Wu-Massacre
2010	"Dangerous" (with Ghostface Killah and Method Man)	—	—	—	Wu-Massacre
2010	"Butter Knives"	—	—	—	Shaolin vs. Wu-Tang
2011	"Shaolin vs. Wu-Tang"	—	—	—	Shaolin vs. Wu-Tang
2011	"Rock n Roll" (featuring Ghostface Killah, Jim Jones and Kobe Honeycutt)	—	—	—	Shaolin vs. Wu-Tang
2013	"All About You" (featuring Estelle)	—	—	—	Fly International Luxurious Art
2013	"Soundboy Kill It" (featuring Melanie Fiona and Assassin)	—	—	—	Fly International Luxurious Art

=== As featured artist ===
Year	Title	Chart positions		Album
Year	Title	US R&B/HH	US Rap	Album
1996	"Firewater" (Fat Joe featuring Big Pun, Raekwon and Armaggedon)	— (Note: "Firewater" did not enter the R&B/Hip-Hop Songs chart, but peaked at number 14 on the Bubbling Under R&B/Hip-Hop Songs chart, which acts as a 25-song extension to the R&B/Hip-Hop Songs chart.)	—	Envy 12" / Endangered Species
1996	"Motherless Child"	—	—	Sunset Park (soundtrack) / Ironman
1996	"Daytona 500"	—	—	Ironman
1997	"So Good' (Davina featuring Raekwon)	—	—	Hoodlum (soundtrack)
1998	"Spring Water" (La the Darkman featuring Raekwon)	—	—	Heist of the Century
1998	"Wu-Tang Cream Team Line Up" (Funkmaster Flex featuring Raekwon, The Harlem Hoodz, Inspectah Deck, Method Man, and Killa Sin)	85	32	The Mix Tape, Vol. 3: 60 Minutes of Funk, The Final Chapter
1998	"Skew It on the Bar-B" (OutKast featuring Raekwon)	—	—	Aquemini
1999	"Rap Life" (Tash featuring Raekwon)	86	45	Rap Life
2000	"Apollo Kids" (Ghostface Killah featuring Raekwon)	— (Note: "Apollo Kids" did not enter the R&B/Hip-Hop Songs chart, but peaked at number 21 on the Bubbling Under R&B/Hip-Hop Songs chart, which acts as a 25-song extension to the R&B/Hip-Hop Songs chart.)	32	Supreme Clientele
2000	"It's Not a Game" (American Cream Team featuring RZA & Raekwon)			Black and White (soundtrack)
2001	"Never Be the Same Again" (Ghostface Killah featuring Carl Thomas and Raekwon)	65	21	Bulletproof Wallets
2004	"Bump Bump" (Prince Po featuring Raekwon)			The Slickness
2008	"Royal Flush" (Big Boi featuring Andre 3000 and Raekwon)	68	—	Non-album single
2013	"New York City" (Troy Ave featuring N.O.R.E., Raekwon and Prodigy)	—	—	New York City: The Album
2018	"Gonna Love Me (Remix)" (Teyana Taylor featuring Raekwon, Method Man and Ghostface Killah)	—	—	K.T.S.E.

== Guest appearances ==
List of non-single guest appearances, with other performing artists, showing year released and album name
Title	Year	Other artist(s)	Album
"Meth vs. Chef"	1994	Method Man	Tical
"Stop the Breaks!"	1994	Ron G, The Notorious B.I.G., KRS-One, Killa Sin, O.C.	It's On! Part 2
"Raw Hide"	1995	Ol' Dirty Bastard, Method Man	Return to the 36 Chambers: The Dirty Version
"Right Back at You"	1995	Mobb Deep, Ghostface Killah	The Infamous
"Eye for an Eye"	1995	Mobb Deep, Nas	The Infamous
"Eye for an Eye" (Alternate Version)	1995	Mobb Deep, Nas, Ghostface Killah	The Infamous Mobb Deep.(Infamouis Sessions)
"Respect Mine"	1995	Fat Joe	Jealous One's Envy
"Investigative Reports"	1995	GZA, U-God, Ghostface Killah	Liquid Swords
"Let's Be Specific"	1995	Funkmaster Flex, Cool Whip, Havoc, Tragedy Khadafi, Freddie Foxxx	The Mix Tape, Volume 1: 60 Minutes of Funk
"Freek'n You (Remix)"	1996	Jodeci, Ghostface Killah	Get on Up
"War Face (Ask Fi War Remix)"	1996	Bounty Killer	My Xperience
"Nasty Immigrants"	1996	12 O'Clock	The Nutty Professor
"Iron Maiden"	1996	Ghostface Killah, Cappadonna	Ironman
"The Faster Blade"	1996	Ghostface Killah	Ironman
"260"	1996	Ghostface Killah	Ironman
"Assassination Day"	1996	Ghostface Killah, Inspectah Deck, RZA, Masta Killa	Ironman
"Winter Warz"	1996	Ghostface Killah, U-God, Masta Killa, Cappadonna	Ironman
"Box in Hand"	1996	Ghostface Killah, The Force M.D.s, Method Man	Ironman
"Fish"	1996	Ghostface Killah, Cappadonna	Ironman
"Camay"	1996	Ghostface Killah, Cappadonna	Ironman
"Black Jesus"	1996	Ghostface Killah, Popa Wu, U-God	Ironman
"After the Smoke Is Clear"	1996	Ghostface Killah, The Delfonics, RZA	Ironman
"Nighttime Vultures"	1996	Mobb Deep	Hell on Earth
"Give You All I Got"	1997	Allure	Allure
"Dart Throwing"	1998	Cappadonna, Method Man	The Pillage
"Intellectuals"	1998	Sunz Of Man, 60 Second Assassin, Hell Razah, U-God	The Last Shall Be First
"Execute Them"	1998	Inspectah Deck, Masta Killa, Streetlife	The Swarm
"John Blaze"	1998	Fat Joe, Nas, Big Pun, Jadakiss	Don Cartagena
"As the World Turnz"	1998	La the Darkman	Heist of the Century
"Black Trump"	1998	Cocoa Brovaz	The Rude Awakening
"Spazzola"	1998	Method Man, Inspectah Deck, Killa Sin, Masta Killa, Streetlife	Tical 2000: Judgement Day
"Movin' On" (Remix)	1998	Mýa, Noreaga	Belly (soundtrack)
"Tha Game"	1998	Pete Rock, Ghostface Killah, Prodigy	Soul Survivor
"Brown Paper Bag Thoughts"	1998	DJ Clue	The Professional
"Frozen"	1999	Slick Rick	The Art of Storytelling
"Can't Fuck Wit"	1999	Mobb Deep	Murda Muzik
"Giant Size"	1999	Killa Sin, American Cream Team	The PJs (soundtrack)
Blue Diamonds"	1999	"Chip Banks	Blue Streak (soundtrack)
"Shell Shock"	1999	U-God, Leatha Face, Hell Razah	Golden Arms Redemption
"Ghetto"	1999	The Madd Rapper, Carl Thomas	Tell Em Why U Madd
"Dem Want War"	1999	Funkmaster Flex and Big Kap	The Tunnel
"Wu Banga 101"	2000	Ghostface Killah, GZA, Masta Killa	Supreme Clientele
"Cuban Linx 2000"	2000	Ruff Endz, Ghostface Killah	Love Crimes
"Everyday Hustler"	2000	L.V.	How Long
"The Heist"	2000	Busta Rhymes, Ghostface Killah, Roc Marciano	Anarchy
"Cream 2001"	2001	DJ Clue, Ghostface Killah	The Professional 2
"Money Talks"	2001	Sticky Fingaz	Blacktrash: The Autobiography of Kirk Jones
"Love Is the Message"	2001	Cappadonna	The Yin & The Yang
"The Jump Up"	2001	Benzino, Cormega, Supreme	The Benzino Project
"Maxine"	2001	Ghostface Killah	Bulletproof Wallets
"The Forest"	2001	Ghostface Killah	Bulletproof Wallets
"The Hilton"	2001	Ghostface Killah	Bulletproof Wallets
"Flowers"	2001	Ghostface Killah, Method Man, Superb	Bulletproof Wallets
"Respect Mine"	2003	Mathematics, Method Man, Cappadonna	Love, Hell or Right
"What's Fuckin With Us"	2003	CHOPS	Virtuosity
"I Never Liked Ya Ass"	2003	DJ Kay Slay, Fat Joe, Scarface	The Streetsweeper, Vol. 1
"Untouchables"	2004	DJ Kay Slay, AZ, Prodigy	The Streetsweeper, Vol. 2
"The Turn"	2004	Method Man	Tical 0: The Prequel
"You Belong to Me"	2004	Famil	Promo
"D.T.D."	2004	Masta Killa, Ghostface Killah	No Said Date
"I Gotta Get Paid"	2004	Lil Flip, Ghostface Killah	Blade: Trinity (soundtrack)
"Real Nillaz"	2005	Mathematics, Ghostface Killah, Buddah Bless, Eyeslow	The Problem
"Advanced Pawns"	2005	DJ Muggs, GZA, RZA, Sen Dog	Grandmasters
"Destruction of a Guard"	2005	DJ Muggs, GZA	Grandmasters
"Intoxicated"	2005	Ol' Dirty Bastard, Method Man, Macy Gray	A Son Unique
"So Long"	2005	Cassidy, Mashonda	I'm a Hustla
"Chitty Chitty Bang Bang"	2005	Capone	Pain, Time And Glory
"New York"	2005	AZ, Ghostface Killah	A.W.O.L
"Gorilla Rap"	2005	Tragedy Khadafi	Thug Matrix
"Black Opera"	2005	Supernatural	S.P.I.T.
"The Watch"	2005	Ghostface Killah	Put It on the Line
"Kilo"	2006	Ghostface Killah	Fishscale
"R.A.G.U."	2006	Ghostface Killah	Fishscale
"Dogs of War"	2006	Ghostface Killah, Cappadonna, Sun God	Fishscale
"Three Bricks"	2006	Ghostface Killah, The Notorious B.I.G.	Fishscale
"Address Me as Mister (Remix)"	2006	Papoose, Busta Rhymes	The Crown
"Goldmine"	2006	Busta Rhymes	The Big Bang
"Original Man"	2006	Lord Jamar, Kasim Allah	The 5% Album
"It's What It Is"	2006	Masta Killa, Ghostface Killah	Made in Brooklyn
"Where It Started At (NY)"	2006	Hi-Tek, Papoose, Talib Kweli, Jadakiss, Dion	Hi-Teknology²: The Chip
"Heaven or Hell"	2006	Joy Denalane	Born & Raised
"The Glide"	2006	Method Man, U-God, La the Darkman	4:21...The Day After
"Presidential MC"	2006	Method Man, RZA	4:21...The Day After
"Brazil"	2006	Ill Bill, Q-Unique	Ill Bill Is The Future Vol. 2: I'm A Goon
"Thousands to M's" (Remix)	2006	Ill Bill, Q-Unique	Ill Bill Is The Future Vol. 2: I'm A Goon
"Enemy" (Remix)	2006	Ill Bill	Ill Bill Is The Future Vol. 2: I'm A Goon
"Cocaine World"		Ill Bill	Ill Bill Is The Future Vol. 2: I'm A Goon
"Sweetest Girl (Dollar Bill)" (Remix)	2007	Wyclef Jean, Akon, Lil Wayne	—N/a
"Wig Splash"	2007	Wu-Syndicate	The Syndicate Is Back
"Something to Say"	2007	Paraziții	Slalom printre cretini
"Yolanda's House"	2007	Ghostface Killah, Method Man	The Big Doe Rehab
"Rec-Room Therapy"	2007	Ghostface Killah, U-God	The Big Doe Rehab
"Paisley Darts"	2007	Ghostface Killah, Sun God, Trife da God, Method Man, Cappadonna	The Big Doe Rehab
"Shakey Dog Starring Lolita"	2007	Ghostface Killah	The Big Doe Rehab
"My Piano"	2007	Hi-Tek, Ghostface Killah	Hi-Teknology 3
"The PJ's"	2008	Pete Rock, Masta Killa	NY's Finest
"Bulletproof Diaries"	2008	Game	LAX
"Coka Moshiach"	2008	Ill Bill	The Hour of Reprisal
"Run (Remix)"	2008	Ghostface, Lil Wayne, Jadakiss	GhostDeini the Great
"Lazy Eye"	2008	Frequency 420	Frequency 420
"Puttin' Work In"	2008	EPMD	We Mean Business
"Four Minutes to Lock Down"	2009	Method Man, Redman, Ghostface Killah	Blackout! 2
"Ice Cream"	2009	Fat Joe, T.A.	Jealous Ones Still Envy 2 (J.O.S.E. 2)
"100 Miles and Runnin'"	2009	Warren G, Nate Dogg	The G Files
"24k Rap"	2009	J Dilla, Havoc	Jay Stay Paid
"Yessir"	2009	MF Doom	Born Like This
"Cartel Gathering"	2009	Jadakiss, Ghostface Killah	The Last Kiss
"Life's a Gamble"	2009	Cappadonna	Slang Prostituion 2
"Legacy"	2009	Ceazar, Xzibit, Murs	Ninja Assassin Soundtrack
"Coke"	2009	U-God, Slaine, Y-Not Da Best	Dopium
"Weight Droppin'"	2009	Playaz Circle	Flight 360: The Takeoff
"Stay Off the Fuckin' Flowers"	2009	The Black Keys	Blakroc
"I Wish"	2010	Yelawolf	Trunk Muzik 0-60
"Time Will Tell"	2010	Styles P, DJ Green Lantern	The Green Ghost Project
"The Big Game"	2010	Inspectah Deck, AC	Manifesto
"One Thing"	2010	Freeway, Jake One	The Stimulus Package
"Audio Meth"	2010	Rick Ross	Teflon Don
"Dutch Masters vs. Phillies vs. Bamboo"	2010	Capone-N-Noreaga	The War Report 2: Report the War
"The Reserves"	2010	Capone-N-Noreaga	The War Report 2: Report the War
"The Oath"	2010	Capone-N-Noreaga, Busta Rhymes	The War Report 2: Report the War
"Runaway Love" (Remix)	2010	Justin Bieber, Kanye West	Never Say Never: The Remixes
"Lord Lord Lord"	2010	Kanye West, Mos Def, Swizz Beatz, Charlie Wilson	—N/a
"Everyday Struggle"	2010	Faith Evans	Something About Faith
"Chase Manhattan"	2010	Ill Bill, DJ Muggs	Kill Devil Hills
"Gorgeous"	2010	Kanye West, Kid Cudi	My Beautiful Dark Twisted Fantasy
"Sooner or Later (Die 1 Day)"	2010	Lloyd Banks	H.F.M. 2 (Hunger for More 2)
"The Heat"	2010	Twista	The Perfect Storm
"Gutter Water"	2010	Gangrene	Gutter Water
"Live It"	2010	Paul Wall, Jay Electronica, Yelawolf	Heart of a Champion
"Superhero Music"	2010	Diggy Simmons	Airborne
"Michael Knight" (Remix)	2010	Currensy	Pilot Talk II
"Thirsty Fish"	2010	Wisemen	Children of a Lesser God
"Ghetto"	2010	Ghostface Killah, Cappadonna, U-God	Apollo Kids
"Troublemakers"	2010	Ghostface Killah, Redman, Method Man	Apollo Kids
"Pushing Keys"	2011	Fat Joe	The Darkside Vol. 2
"Drops Is Out"	2011	Jim Jones, Mel Matrix, Sen City	Capo
"Thor's Hammer"	2011	Vast Aire, Vordul Mega	OX 2010: A Street Odyssey
"Combat Jazz"	2011	Limp Bizkit	Gold Cobra
"Prevail"	2011	Smif-N-Wessun, Pete Rock	Monumental
"No Pretending"	2011	9th Wonder, Big Remo	The Wonder Years
"Black Diamonds"	2011	Rapsody	Thank Her Now
"The Red Carpet"	2011	Evidence, Ras Kass	Cats & Dogs
"Letter To Da Rap Game"	2011	2 Chainz, Dolla Boy	T.R.U. REALigion
"Of The Soul" (Remix)	2012	Mac Miller, Posdnous	—N/a
"Riviera Flow"	2012	Ryan Leslie	—N/a
"Tried to Tell 'Em"	2012	Paypa, Nick D's, JD Era	Henny on the Rocks 2: The Bottle
"Underground Killas"	2012	ASAP Mob	Lords Never Worry
"The Morning"	2012	Pusha T, Common, 2 Chainz, Cyhi the Prynce, Kid Cudi, D'banj, Kanye West	Cruel Summer
"Crack Spot Stories"	2012	Ghostface Killah, Sheek Louch, Jadakiss	Wu Block
"Comin' For Ya Head"	2012	Ghostface Killah, Sheek Louch, Styles P	Wu Block
"Do It Like Us"	2012	Ghostface Killah, Sheek Louch	Wu Block
"I Only Say It Cause It's True"	2013	Classified, Kuniva	Classified
"Bullet Proof"	2013	DJ Kay Slay, Styles P, Sheek Louch	Grown Man Hip Hop Part 2 (Sleepin' With The Enemy)
"24 Karats of Gold" (Remix)	2013	Big Sean, J. Cole	—N/a
"Wubian Nation"	2013	Killah Priest	The Psychic World of Walter Reed
"Men of Respect"	2013	Mathematics, Eyes-Low, Method Man, Bad Luck, Termanology, Cappadonna	Prelude to the Answer
"Face The Problemzz"	2013	Mathematics, Gza, Cappadonna, Problemz	Prelude to the Answer
"Cypher"	2013	HS87, Casey Veggies, Xzibit, Rick Ross, Method Man, Redman, Schoolboy Q	All I’ve Ever Dreamed Of
"Rhyme Room"	2013	Yelawolf, Killer Mike	Trunk Muzik Returns
"Gwala Gwala"	2013	Joie 13	13 Ravens
"Frank Lucas"	2013	Un Kasa, Bub	The Wait Is Over
"Reckless"	2013	Styles P	Float
"Faces of Death"	2013	N.O.R.E., Swizz Beatz, French Montana, Busta Rhymes	Student of the Game
"All About You"	2013	Funkmaster Flex, Estelle	Who You Mad At? Me Or Yourself?
"Favorite Rap Stars"	2013	Havoc, Styles P	13
"We Go Where Ever We Want"	2013	French Montana, Ne-Yo	Excuse My French
"R.I.P."	2013	Prodigy, Havoc	Albert Einstein
"Bird's Eye View"	2013	Statik Selektah, Joey Badass, Black Thought	Extended Play
"Hitman For Hire"	2013	DJ Kay Slay, Joell Ortiz, Fred the Godson	The Last Champion
"Unorthodox"	2013	Tony Touch, JD Era, Ghostface Killah, RZA	The Piece Maker 3: Return of the 50 MC's
"Seven Series Triplets"	2013	Action Bronson, Prodigy	Saaab Stories
"4 Horsemen"	2013	Mathematics, Inspectah Deck, Method Man, Ghostface Killah	The Answer
"Fast Lane"	2013	Vado	Slime Flu 4
"Coconut Oil"	2013	Rapsody, Mela Machinko	She Got Game
"The Town"	2013	Loaded Lux, Murda Mook	You Gon Get This Work
"U Can Cry to Me"	2013	Mack Wilds, Doug E. Fresh	New York: A Love Story
"Drop a Diamond"	2013	Lloyd Banks	A.O.N. (All Or Nothing) Series Vol. 1: F.N.O. (Failure's No Option)
"No Competition"	2013	Bun B, Kobe	Trill OG: The Epilogue
"Violations"	2013	Talib Kweli	Gravitas
"Jolly Ranchers"	2013	The Alchemist	The Cutting Room Floor 3
"90s Flow"	2014	DJ Kay Slay, Fat Joe, Ghostface Killah, Sheek Louch, McGruff, N.O.R.E., Lil' Fame, Prodigy, Rell	Rhyme or Die
"Bet Dat"	2014	Maino	K.O.B.
"Blind Threats"	2014	Schoolboy Q	Oxymoron
"Get Money"	2014	Redlight	36
"Bomb"	2014	Freddie Gibbs	Piñata
"Honorable"	2014	Cormega	Mega Philosophy
"Freedom of Speech"	2014	DJ Kay Slay, Papoose, Saigon	The Last Hip Hop Disciple
"Paper Chasing"	2014	DJ Kay Slay, Sauce Money	The Last Hip Hop Disciple
"Influenza"	2015	Raz Fresco	Pablo Frescobar
"Foul 120"	2015	Capone-n-Noreaga, Tragedy	Lessons
"King of New York"	2015	Ghostface Killah	Twelve Reasons to Die II
The Purple Tape	2015	Method Man, Inspectah Deck	The Meth Tape
"Watch How You Move"	2015	Busta Rhymes, Yummy Bing	The Return Of The Dragon (Abstract Left for Vacation)
"You Know"	2016	Flume, Allan Kingdom	Skin
"Out for That Life"	2017	Kool G Rap	Return of the Don
"Billy Ocean"	2017	DJ Khaled, Fat Joe	Grateful
"Clans & Clicks"	2017	Sean Price, Smif-N-Wessun, Rock, Method Man, Inspectah Deck, Foul Monday, Nottz	Imperius Rex
"Nobody Move"	2017	Statik Selektah, Royce da 5'9"	8
"Epicenter"	2018	U-God, Inspectah Deck, Scotty Wotty	Venom
"Seen a Lot of Things"	2019	Ghostface Killah, Harley	Of Mics and Men OST
"My Style"	2019	Erick Sermon, N.O.R.E.	Vernia
"Watch Em Holla"	2019	Ghostface Killah, Masta Killa, Cappadonna and DJ Grouch	The Lost Tapes
"July 27"	2019	Westside Gunn	FIAAG
"Western World"	2019	Lion Babe	Cosmic Wind
"Rain on Snow"	2019	DJ Shadow, Ghostface, Inspectah Deck	Our Pathetic Age
"Marchello Intro"	2019	Griselda	WWCD
"Dreamland"	2019	Smif-n-Wessun	The All
"More to the Story"	2020	Lil Wayne	Tha Carter V
"Wu-Lords"	2020	Flee Lord	In the Name of Prodigy
"Science Class"	2022	Westside Gunn, Busta Rhymes, Ghostface Killah, Stove God Cooks	10
"Feel No Pain"	2022	Freddie Gibbs, Anderson .Paak	Soul Sold Separately
"The Darkest Part"	2022	Danger Mouse & Black Thought	Cheat Codes
"Body Rock"	2023	Sheek Louch, Dyce Pains	Gorillaween 5
"Unpredictable"	2023	Statik Selektah, Ghostface Killah, Inspectah Deck & Method Man	The Balancing Act
"Skate Odyssey"	2024	Ghostface Killah	Set the Tone
"The Red Moon in Osaka"	2024	Conway the Machine	Slant Face Klllah
"The Source"	2024	Berner, Ghostface Killah, Killer Mike	HOFFA
"Eagle Claw"	2025	Masta Killa, Cappadonna	Balance
"Unfinished Business"	2025	Grafh, Sean Strange	—N/a
"The Trial"	2025	Ghostface Killah, Method Man, GZA, Reek Da Villian, PiLLZ	Supreme Clientele 2
"Clear Black Nights"	2025	Mobb Deep, Ghostface Killah	Infinite
"Territories (Hell's a Foolish Flow)"	2025	Meditative Animal	Metaphysical Sherpa: Spiritual Alchemy
"Hit Different"	2025	Swerve Strickland, Monteasy	—N/a
"Rock Ya Body"	2026	Rakim, Kurupt, Masta Killa, Ghostface Killah	The Godbody LP

== Music videos ==
Year	Title	Director(s)
1994	"Heaven & Hell"	Ralph McDaniels
1995	"Criminology"	Froi Cuenta & Guy Guillet
1995	"Glaciers of Ice"	Froi Cuenta
1995	"Ice Cream"	Ralph McDaniels
1995	"Incarcerated Scarfaces"	Ralph McDaniels
2000	"100 rounds" "Live From New York"	`
2003	"The Hood"	`
2009	"New Wu"	Danny Hastings
2009	"House of Flying Daggers"	Erick Sasso and Brian Wendelken
2009	"Walk wit Me"	G. Visuals
2009	"Have Mercy"	Littles & Wilc
2009	"Catalina"	G. Visuals
2009	"Surgical Gloves"	`
2009	"Pyrex Vision"	G. Visuals
2010	"Canal Street"	LaMarck
2010	"Ason Jones"	Kris Kinetik
2011	"Shaolin vs. Wu-Tang"	Konee Rok
2011	"Rich & Black"	
2011	"Butter Knives"	
2013	"All About You"	
2015	"1, 2, 1, 2"	
2017	"This Is What It Comes Too"	
2017	"Purple Brick Road"	
2017	"M&N"	

Featured Videos
Year	Title	Artist
1996	Motherless Child	Ghostface Killah
1996	Daytona 500	Ghostface Killah, Cappadonna
1996	Camay	Ghostface Killah, Cappadonna
1997	So Good (Remix)	Davina
1998	Movin Out (Remix)	Mya, Noreaga
1998	Wu-Tang Cream Team Line Up	Funkmaster Flex, American Cream Team, Inspectah Deck, Method Man & Killa Sin
1998	Spring Water	La the Darkman
1998	Skew It on the Bar-B	OutKast
1998	John Blaze	Fat Joe, Jadakiss, Nas, Big Pun
1999	Rap Life	Tash
2000	Apollo Kids	Ghostface Killah
2000	It's Not a Game	American Cream Team, RZA
2001	Never Be the Same Again	Ghostface Killah
2009	24k Rap	J Dilla, Havoc
2010	The Reserves	CNN
2011	Carry It	Travis Barker, RZA
2012	Google It	N.O.R.E., Styles P
2013	NYC	Troy Ave, N.O.R.E.
2013	86 Remix	AZ
2014	Violations	Talib Kweli
2015	The Purple Tape	Method Man, Inspectah Deck
2018	Gonna Love Me (Remix)	Teyana Taylor, Method Man and Ghostface Killah
2019	Western World	Lion Babe
2020	Survive or Die	Diamond D, Fat Joe
