= Masta Killa discography =

This is the discography of American rapper Masta Killa.

== Studio albums ==
List of studio albums, with selected chart positions, sales figures and certifications
| Title | Album details | Peak chart positions | | |
| Title | Album details | US | US R&B | US Rap |
|---|---|---|---|---|
| No Said Date | Released: June 1, 2004 (US); Label: Nature Sounds; Formats: CD, LP, cassette, digital download | 136 | 31 | — |
| Made in Brooklyn | Released: August 8, 2006 (US); Label: Nature Sounds; Formats: CD, LP, digital download | 176 | 42 | 23 |
| Selling My Soul | Released: December 11, 2012 (US); Label: Nature Sounds; Formats: CD, LP, digital download | — | — | — |
| Loyalty Is Royalty | Released: September 29, 2017; Label: Nature Sounds; Formats: CD, LP, cassette, digital download | — | — | — |
| Balance | Released: May 30, 2025; Label: Nature Sounds; Formats: LP, digital download | — | — | — |
"—" denotes a title that did not chart, or was not released in that territory.

== Live albums ==
List of live albums, with selected chart positions
| Title | Album details | Peak chart positions | | |
| Title | Album details | US | US R&B | US Rap |
|---|---|---|---|---|
| Masta Killa Live | Released: March 30, 2010 (US); Label: Gold Dust Records; Formats: CD, digital download | — | — | — |
"—" denotes a title that did not chart, or was not released in that territory.

== Compilation albums ==
List of compilation albums, with selected chart positions
| Title | Album details | Peak chart positions | | |
| Title | Album details | US | US R&B | US Rap |
|---|---|---|---|---|
| Masta Killa Presents: The Next Chamber | Released: November 16, 2010 (US); Label: Royal-Lion Entertainment; Formats: digital download | — | — | — |

== Collaborative albums ==
List of compilation albums, with selected chart positions
| Title | Album details | Peak chart positions | | |
| Title | Album details | US | US R&B | US Rap |
|---|---|---|---|---|
| The Godbody LP (with Rakim and Kurupt) | Released: September 18, 2026 (US); Label: Holy Toledo Productions, DMG, Compound Interest; Formats: digital download | — | — | — |

== Singles ==
List of singles, with selected chart positions and certifications, showing year released and album name
| Title | Year | Peak chart positions | | | Album |
| Title | Year | US | US R&B | US Rap | Album |
|---|---|---|---|---|---|
| "No Said Date" | 2003 | — | — | — | No Said Date |
| "Digi Warfare" (featuring U-God and RZA) | 2003 | — | — | — | No Said Date |
| "D.T.D." (featuring Raekwon and Ghostface Killah) | 2004 | — | — | — | No Said Date |
| "Queen" (featuring Allah Real) | 2004 | — | — | — | No Said Date |
| "Ringing Bells" | 2006 | — | — | — | Made in Brooklyn |
| "It's What It Is" (featuring Raekwon and Ghostface Killah) | 2006 | — | — | — | Made in Brooklyn |
| "Brooklyn King" | 2006 | — | — | — | Made in Brooklyn |
| "Iron God Chamber" (featuring U-God, RZA and Method Man) | 2006 | — | — | — | Made in Brooklyn |
| "Street Corner" (featuring Inspectah Deck and GZA) | 2006 | — | — | — | Made in Brooklyn |
| "Things Just Ain't The Same" | 2010 | — | — | — | Selling My Soul |
| "Therapy" (featuring Method Man and Rodman) | 2017 | | | | Loyalty Is Royalty |
"—" denotes a recording that did not chart or was not released in that territory.

== Guest appearances ==
List of non-single guest appearances, with other performing artists, showing year released and album name
| Title | Year | Other artist(s) | Album |
|---|---|---|---|
| "Snakes" | 1995 | Ol' Dirty Bastard, Killah Priest, RZA, Buddha Monk | Return to the 36 Chambers: The Dirty Version |
| "Glaciers of Ice" | 1995 | Raekwon, Ghostface Killah, Blue Raspberry, 60 Second Assassin | Only Built 4 Cuban Linx… |
| "Wu-Gambinos" | 1995 | Raekwon, Ghostface Killah, Method Man, RZA | Only Built 4 Cuban Linx… |
| "Duel of the Iron Mic" | 1995 | GZA, Ol' Dirty Bastard, Inspectah Deck | Liquid Swords |
| "Winter Warz" | 1996 | Ghostface Killah, Raekwon, Cappadonna, U-God | Ironman / Don't Be a Menace to South Central While Drinking Your Juice in the Hood (soundtrack) |
| "Assassination Day" | 1996 | Ghostface Killah, Inspectah Deck, RZA | Ironman |
| "Eyes A Bleed (RZA Remix)" | 1996 | Bounty Killer | Big Blunts Volume 2 |
| "5 Stars" | 1997 | Killarmy | Silent Weapons for Quiet Wars |
| "Resurrection" | 1998 | Public Enemy | He Got Game (Soundtrack) |
| "Execute Them" | 1998 | Raekwon, Inspectah Deck,Streetlife | Wu-Tang Killa Bees: The Swarm |
| "Illusions" | 1998 | Sunz of Man | The Last Shall Be First |
| "Element of Surprise" | 1998 | La the Darkman, U-God | Heist of the Century |
| "Spazzola" | 1998 | Method Man, Inspectah Deck, Killa Sin, Raekwon, Streetlife | Tical 2000: Judgement Day |
| "Mantis" | 1998 | RZA, Tekitha | Bobby Digital: In Stereo |
| "High Price, Small Reward" | 1999 | GZA | Beneath the Surface |
| "1112" | 1999 | GZA, Killah Priest, Njeri Earth | Beneath the Surface |
| "Breaker Breaker (Remix)" | 1999 | GZA, Inspectah Deck | —N/a |
| "Friction" | 1999 | Inspectah Deck | Uncontrolled Substance |
| "The Table" | 1999 | Raekwon | Immobilarity |
| "Shaolin Temple" | 1999 | —N/a | Wu-Tang Shaolin Style |
| "Wu Banga 101" | 2000 | Ghostface Killah, GZA, Raekwon, Cappadonna | Supreme Clientele |
| "The Man" | 2000 | Superb | Ghost Dog: The Way of the Samurai (soundtrack) |
| "Mortal Kombat" | 2000 | Afu-Ra | Body of the Life Force |
| "Glocko Pop" | 2001 | RZA, Method Man, Streetlife | Digital Bullet |
| "Brooklyn Babies" | 2001 | RZA, The Force M.D.s | Digital Bullet |
| "Fam (Members Only)" | 2002 | GZA, RZA | Legend of the Liquid Sword |
| "The Day After" | 2002 | —N/a | Convexed |
| "Grits" | 2003 | RZA, Allah Real | Birth of a Prince |
| "The Whistle" | 2003 | RZA, Prodigal Sunn | Birth of a Prince |
| "Koto Chotan" | 2003 | RZA, Tash Mahogany | Birth of a Prince |
| "Always NY" | 2003 | Mathematics, U-God, Inspectah Deck, Buddah Bless, Icarus Da Don | Love, Hell & Right |
| "Musketeers of Pig Alley" | 2003 | Raekwon, Inspectah Deck | The Lex Diamond Story |
| "Chains" | 2004 | R.A. the Rugged Man, Killah Priest | Die, Rugged Man, Die |
| "Just the Thought" | 2005 | Prefuse 73, GZA | Surrounded By Silence |
| "USA" | 2005 | Mathematics, Ghostface Killah, Todd, Panama P.I., Eyeslow, Hot Flamez | The Problem |
| "Break That" | 2005 | Mathematics, Ol' Dirty Bastard, U-God | The Problem |
| "Living Like Dat" | 2005 | Afu-Ra | State of the Arts |
| "Unstoppable Threats" | 2005 | GZA, DJ Muggs, Prodigal Sunn | Grandmasters |
| "Sound of the Slums" | 2006 | Inspectah Deck | The Resident Patient |
| "In the Name of Allah" | 2007 | Cilvaringz, Killah Priest, RZA, Shabazz the Disciple | I |
| "Killa Lipstick" | 2007 | Ghostface Killah, Method Man | The Big Doe Rehab |
| "The PJ's" | 2008 | Pete Rock, Raekwon | NY's Finest |
| "Change the Game" | 2008 | The BossFather's, Cappadonna, AB Money | Future Legends |
| "Eat Ya Food" | 2008 | Brooklyn Zu, Killah Priest | Chamber #9, Verse 32 |
| "Fire" | 2008 | Cappadonna | Slang Prostitution |
| "Pencil" | 2008 | GZA, RZA | Pro Tools |
| "We Will Rob You" | 2009 | Raekwon, GZA, Slick Rick | Only Built 4 Cuban Linx... Pt. II |
| "Kiss the Ring" | 2009 | Raekwon, Inspectah Deck | Only Built 4 Cuban Linx... Pt. II |
| "Remarkable Timing" | 2010 | 60 Second Assassin, M Eighty, Popa Wu | —N/a |
| "The Road" | 2011 | Bronze Nazareth, Inspectah Deck | School for the Blindman |
| "Loyalty" | 2011 | 9th Wonder, Halo | The Wonder Years |
| "Drivin Round" | 2012 | Ghostface Killah, Sheek Louch, GZA, Erykah Badu | Wu Block |
| "Guilty" | 2012 | Sound Shogun | Feelthisundastood |
| "I Declare War" | 2013 | Ghostface Killah | Twelve Reasons to Die |
| "Revenge Is Sweet" | 2013 | Ghostface Killah, Killa Sin | Twelve Reasons to Die |
| "Murder Spree" | 2013 | Ghostface Killah, U-God, Inspectah Deck, Killa Sin | Twelve Reasons to Die |
| "Pussy Whistle" | 2013 | Kurupt | Money, Bitches, Power |
| "King's Indian Attack" | 2013 | Bronze Nazareth, Cappadonna, DJ Switch | Terminal Illness Part 2 |
| "Shorty" | 2013 | Mathematics, Cappadonna, JNY | The Answer |
| "Blackstock Stop & Word Bond" | 2014 | Killah Priest, Canibus, Cappadonna | Torah Scrolls |
| "Back to the 36" | 2015 | 9th Prince, Cappadonna | Shaolin Prince |
| "Intelligent Meth" | 2015 | Method Man, Streetlife, iNtElL | The Meth Lab |
| "Crack Babies" | 2016 | Joe Young, Cappadonna, Method Man, Raekwon | Invincible Armor |
| "Point of View" | 2016 | Banks & Steelz, Method Man | Anything But Words |
| "Shadow" | 2016 | Mont Jake | Shadow |
| "The Habitat" | 2017 | Prodigal Sunn, Cappadonna | The Spark |
| "Watch 'em Holla" | 2018 | Ghostface Killah, Raekwon, Cappadonna, DJ Grouch | The Lost Tapes |
| "Ronin's" | 2018 | Method Man, Cappadonna | Meth Lab 2: Lithium |
| "One Rhyme" | 2019 | GZA | Wu-Tang Clan: Of Mics and Men |
| "Of Mics and Men" | 2019 | RZA, Cappadonna | Wu-Tang Clan: Of Mics and Men |
| "Soursop" | 2019 | Ghostface Killah, Harley, Solomon Childs | Ghostface Killahs |
| "Dragon Fire" | 2020 | R.A. the Rugged Man, Ghostface Killah, Kool G Rap, XX3EME | All My Heroes Are Dead |
| "Deadly Movements" | 2020 | The Four Owls | Nocturnal Instincts |
| "M.A.N. Pt. 1 (Father 2 Son) | 2020 | PxRo | M.A.N. |
| "Jack Frost Goes to Shaolin" | 2020 | Jack Frost | The Formula |
| "Yasauke" | 2023 | Cappadonna, Inspectah Deck, Beez | African Killa Beez |
| "For Those Who See" | 2024 | Leaf Dog | Outstanding in My Field |
| "2223" | 2024 | Montao | Echoes of the Cosmos |
| "The Man with the Iron Darts" | 2024 | Cappadonna, Inspectah Deck | The Man with the Iron Darts |
| "Splitting Atoms" | 2024 | Killarmy, La the Darkman, Inspectah Deck, Cappadonna | —N/a |
| "Sword Symphony" | 2024 | Layson | —N/a |
| "Be Ill" | 2024 | Rakim, Kurupt | G.O.D.s Network - Reb7rth |

== Videos ==
| Year | Album | Title | Director | Other featured artist |
|---|---|---|---|---|
| 2004 | No Said Date | Old Man | n/c | Ol' Dirty Bastard, RZA |
| 2012 | Selling My Soul | What You See / Cali Sun | Jeff Pliskin | |
| 2012 | Selling My Soul | Things Just Ain't the Same | Khalik Allah | |
| 2017 | Loyalty is Royalty | Therapy | Method Man | Method Man, Redman |
| 2017 | Loyalty is Royalty | OGs Told Me | Jeff Pliskin | Boys Back, Moe Roc |
| 2017 | Loyalty is Royalty | Flex With Me | Adam Rush | Chanel Sosa |
