= Mixtape (disambiguation) =

A mixtape is a compilation of songs recorded in a specific order.

Mixtape or The Mix Tape may also refer to:

== Art, entertainment and media ==
=== Music ===
==== Albums ====
- Mix Tape, a 2006 album by Los Abandoned
- Mix Tape (The Felice Brothers album), 2010
- Mixtape (Hadouken! EP), 2007
- Mixtape (Stray Kids EP), 2018
- Mixtape, Vol. 1 (EP), a 2020 EP by Kane Brown
- The Mix Tape (KRS-One album), 2002
- The Mix Tape (MC Breed album), 2004
- The Mix Tape, Vol. 1, the 1995 installment of Funkmaster Flex's Mix Tape series
- The Mix Tape, Vol. II, the 1997 installment of Funkmaster Flex's Mix Tape series
- The Mix Tape, Vol. III, the 1999 installment of Funkmaster Flex's Mix Tape series
- The Mix Tape, Vol. IV, the 2000 installment of Funkmaster Flex's Mix Tape series
- The Mixtape (Meridian Dawn EP), 2014

==== Bands ====
- Mixtapes (band), American rock band

==== Songs ====
- "Mix Tape", a song from the play Avenue Q (2002)
- "Mix Tape", a song from Brand New's 2001 album Your Favorite Weapon (2001)
- "Mixtape" (Autumn Hill song), 2016
- "Mixtape", a song from Chance the Rapper's album Coloring Book (2016)
- "Mixtape", a song from Butch Walker's album, Letters (2004)

=== Films ===
- Mixtape (film), a 2021 American film
- Mixtape, a 2009 short film written and directed by Luke Snellin

=== Television ===
- Mix Tape (miniseries), a 2025 Irish-Australian miniseries
- Soundtrack (TV series), a 2019 American musical TV series, announced with the working title Mixtape

=== Video games ===
- Mixtape (video game), a 2026 narrative adventure game

== Other uses ==
- Mix Tape: The Art of Cassette Culture, a 2005 book edited by musician Thurston Moore
- Video mixtape, a stock footage movie consisting of video clips
