= The Mix Tape, Vol. III =

The Mix Tape, Volume III: 60 Minutes of Funk (The Final Chapter)

Mixtape by Funkmaster Flex
- Released: August 11, 1998
- Recorded: 1998
- Studios: D&D Studios (New York, NY)
- Genre: Hip hop
- Length: 1:15:43
- Label: Loud
- Producers: Chris Lighty (exec.); Jessica Rosenblum (exec.); Funkmaster Flex (also exec.)

Funkmaster Flex chronology
The Mix Tape, Volume II (60 Minutes of Funk) (1997)	The Mix Tape, Volume III: 60 Minutes of Funk (The Final Chapter) (1998)	The Tunnel (1999)

Professional ratings
Review scores
Source	Rating
AllMusic	4.5/5 stars

The Mix Tape, Volume III: 60 Minutes of Funk (The Final Chapter) is a mixtape by American DJ Funkmaster Flex. It was released on August 11, 1998, via Loud Records, serving as a sequel to 1997 The Mix Tape, Volume II (60 Minutes of Funk) and the third installment in his 60 Minute of Funk mixtape series. Recording sessions took place at D&D Studios in New York.

It spawned two singles: "Here We Go" featuring Khadejia and The Product G&B, which peaked at #72 on the Billboard Hot 100, and "Wu-Tang Cream Team Line-Up" featuring Wu-Tang Clan members and affiliates, which found minor success on rap & R&B charts.

== Commercial performance ==
The album became Funkmaster Flex's most successful Mix Tape release, peaking at #4 on the Billboard 200 and at #2 on the Top R&B/Hip-Hop Albums, with sales of over 123,000 copies sold in the first week. The album has achieved gold status from the Recording Industry Association of America on November 4, 1998, for sales and shipments of 500,000 copies.

== Track listing ==
No.	Title	Producer(s)	Length
1.	"Freestyle over Chic "Good Times"/Bob James "Take Me to the Mardi Gras" Instrumentals" (performed by Busy Bee)		2:54
2.	"Here We Go" (performed by Khadejia and The Product G&B)	Funkmaster Flex; Wyclef Jean; Jerry Duplessis^{[a]}	2:50
3.	"Freestyle over Mobb Deep "Give Up the Goods (Just Step)" Instrumental" (performed by DMX)	The Abstract	1:54
4.	"Freestyle over Raekwon "Incarcerated Scarfaces" Instrumental" (performed by Charli Baltimore and Cam'ron)	RZA	2:53
5.	"Ain't No Nigga" (performed by Jay-Z)		1:34
6.	"Freestyle over Wu-Tang Clan "MGM" Instrumental" (performed by Ice Cube and Mack 10)	True Master	1:53
7.	"Freestyle" (performed by KRS-One)	Domingo	1:21
8.	"Wild for the Night" (performed by Rampage)		2:12
9.	"Thug Brothers" (performed by Big Pun and Noreaga)	Jesse West	2:47
10.	"Freestyle" (performed by Mos Def)	Shawn J. Period	1:33
11.	"Prime Time" (performed by Tha Alkaholiks and Xzibit)	Pete Rock	1:22
12.	"Freestyle over Xzibit "Los Angeles Times" Instrumental" (performed by Common)	Mel-Man	1:22
13.	"Freestyle over Raekwon "Ice Cream" Instrumental" (performed by Canibus)	RZA	1:21
14.	"Freestyle over Wu-Tang Clan "Triumph" Instrumental" (performed by Missy Elliott)	RZA	1:15
15.	"Freestyle over Slick Rick "Mona Lisa" Instrumental" (performed by Slick Rick)	Slick Rick	1:34
16.	"Show Down" (performed by Buckshot and Q-Tip)	Da Beatminerz	1:47
17.	"Do That" (performed by Cocoa Brovaz and Starang Wondah)	Jeff "Duval" Brown	1:41
18.	"Freestyle over Mobb Deep "Shook Ones (Part II)" Instrumental" (performed by Mariah Carey and The League)	Mobb Deep	1:21
19.	"Freestyle over Wu-Tang Clan "It's Yourz" Instrumental" (performed by King Sun)	RZA	1:06
20.	"Freestyle" (performed by Gang Starr)	Gang Starr	1:37
21.	"Shake Whatcha Mama Gave Ya" (performed by Lyve-N. Dyrect)	Eddison Electrik; Salaam Remi; Ted Kinney^{[a]}	2:09
22.	"Get Money" (performed by Junior M.A.F.I.A.)		1:49
23.	"Wu-Tang Cream Team Line-Up" (performed by Raekwon, The Harlem Hoodz, Inspectah Deck, Method Man and Killa Sin)	DJ Scratch	3:14
24.	"Freestyle over Tha Alkaholiks "Next Level" Instrumental" (performed by Lord Tariq and Peter Gunz)	Diamond D	2:03
25.	"Freestyle over Raekwon "Glaciers of Ice" Instrumental" (performed by Mobb Deep)	RZA	2:55
26.	"That Shit" (performed by A Tribe Called Quest and J Dilla)	The Ummah	2:07
27.	"Freestyle over Mobb Deep "Front Lines (Hell on Earth)" Instrumental" (performed by Erykah Badu)	Mobb Deep	1:09
28.	"Freestyle over Xzibit "At the Speed of Life" Instrumental" (performed by Big Pun, Cuban Link, Armageddon, Fat Joe from Terror Squad)	Thayod Ausar	2:48
29.	"Shimmy Shimmy Ya" (performed by Ol' Dirty Bastard)		1:34
30.	"Put Your Hammer Down" (performed by Wu-Tang Clan)	RZA	2:22
31.	"Jump Around" (performed by House of Pain)		1:21
32.	"O.P.P." (performed by Naughty by Nature)		1:35
33.	"Whoop Whoop" (performed by DJ Pooh)		0:19
34.	"Freestyle" (performed by Eightball)	Mo-Suave-A	1:50
35.	"Freestyle over Mobb Deep "Drop a Gem on 'em" Instrumental" (performed by EPMD)	Mobb Deep	1:51
36.	"Freestyle over Sadat X "Lump Lump" Instrumental" (performed by Keith Murray)	Buckwild	1:48
37.	"Show Me Love" (performed by 24/7)	Jesse West	1:33
38.	"Freestyle" (performed by Flipmode Squad)	Busta Rhymes	3:41
39.	"10% Dis" (performed by Foxy Brown)	Robert "Shim" Kirkland; Charly "Suga Bear" Charles	1:01
40.	"Freestyle" (performed by Shaquille O'Neal and Sonja Blade)	Clark Kent	2:00
Total length:			1:15:43

Notes

- ^{^[a]} signifies a co-producer.

== Charts ==
Chart (1998)	Peak position
Dutch Albums (Album Top 100)	29
German Albums (Offizielle Top 100)	56
US Billboard 200	4
US Top R&B/Hip-Hop Albums (Billboard)	2

== Certifications ==
Region	Certification	Certified units/sales
United States (RIAA)	Gold	500,000^{^}
^{^} Shipments figures based on certification alone.
