= Glaciers of Ice =

1995 single by Raekwon featuring Ghostface Killah and Masta Killa

Single by Raekwon featuring Ghostface Killah and Masta Killa

from the album Only Built 4 Cuban Linx...
- A-side: "Criminology"
- Released: 1995
- Genre: East Coast hip-hop; mafioso rap
- Length: 5:20
- Label: Loud
- Songwriter(s): Corey Woods; Robert Diggs; Dennis Coles; Elgin Turner
- Producer(s): RZA

Raekwon singles chronology
"Heaven & Hell" (1994)	"Glaciers of Ice" / "Criminology" (1995)	"Incarcerated Scarfaces" / "Ice Cream" (1995)

Ghostface Killah singles chronology
"Heaven & Hell" (1994)	"Glaciers of Ice" / "Criminology" (1995)	"Ice Cream" (1995)

Masta Killa singles chronology
"Glaciers of Ice" / "Criminology" (1995)	"Breaker Breaker (Remix)" (1999)

Music video
- "Glaciers of Ice" on YouTube

"Glaciers of Ice" is a song by American rapper Raekwon from his debut studio album Only Built 4 Cuban Linx... (1995). It was released as the B-side of his single "Criminology". Produced by RZA, the song features fellow Wu-Tang Clan members Ghostface Killah and Masta Killa. It contains additional vocals from singer Blue Raspberry and rapper 60 Second Assassin of Sunz of Man.

== Background ==
The opening skit of the song revolves around Raekwon and Ghostface Killah buying Clarks, which was a common activity of theirs at the time. In the skit, Ghostface talks about his liking for dyeing his shoes in unique color schemes, particularly mentioning navy blue and cream as a suggestion. Raekwon stated in an interview with XXL:

We had bumped into a Chinese nigga who could dye shit. That was Ghost's man. And we was just runnin' back and forth to that nigga every time we wanted to go get some shoes. Back then, we was into shoes hard. We wanted to wear Clarks because the shits was comfortable and nobody in the game was fuckin' with 'em. So you know, we'd be going to dye shit, and that's where Ghost came up with the idea to slice 'em. I was the solid-color nigga; he was the striped nigga. We started coming up with different flavors. So he was letting niggas know, "I wanna get a pair of Clarks like, I'm a murder 'em!"

Ghostface recorded the skit in the car with RZA, who had a portable DAT machine with microphone.

One night, Blue Raspberry was singing Patti LaBelle's rendition of "Over the Rainbow" in the studio. RZA recorded her toward the end, when she sang "Why then, oh why c-a-a-n't I?" This was used as a sample in "Glaciers of Ice".

Raekwon originally rapped his portion of the track to only the drums of the beat. He did not like his rhyme, although everyone else did, and planned to change it the next day. When he went back, the final version of the beat had been created and it included Blue Raspberry's vocals.

"Glaciers of Ice" was one of the first songs recorded for Only Built 4 Cuban Linx.... Raekwon has stated

And I just love how the beat, the beat was changing. It was a different kind of sound. And when I wrote that, I was feeling like I was standing in the middle of my project, and it just took me back to that hustling stage of my life. It felt good writing it, you know: "Standing on the block, Reebok gun cocked." That was the attitude when we was on the block, you know. We was just them type of kids. And it was just strong lyrics on there."

== Content ==
Lyrically, the song revolves around criminal activities such as committing heists and selling crack.

== Charts ==
Chart (1995)	Peak position
US Billboard Hot 100	43
US Hot R&B/Hip-Hop Songs (Billboard)	32
US Hot Rap Songs (Billboard)	5
