= Only Built 4 Cuban Linx... Pt. II =

Studio album by Raekwon
- Released: September 8, 2009
- Recorded: 2005–2009
- Genre: Hip-hop
- Length: 70:52
- Labels: Ice H20; EMI
- Producers: The Alchemist; Young Justice; BT; Busta Rhymes; Dr. Dre; Erick Sermon; Icewater Productions; J Dilla; Mark Batson; Marley Marl; Mathematics; MoSS; Necro; Pete Rock; Raekwon; RZA (also exec.); Scram Jones; True Master

Raekwon chronology
The Lex Diamond Story (2003)	Only Built 4 Cuban Linx... Pt. II (2009)	Wu-Massacre (2010)

Wu-Tang Clan solo chronology
Dopium (2009)	Only Built 4 Cuban Linx... Pt. II (2009)	Ghostdini: Wizard of Poetry in Emerald City (2009)

Singles from Only Built 4 Cuban Linx... Pt. II
- 1. "New Wu" Released: May 19, 2009; 2. "House of Flying Daggers" Released: August 26, 2009; 3. "Walk Wit Me" Released: September 2009; 4. "Have Mercy" Released: September 2009; 5. "Catalina" Released: October 2009

Only Built 4 Cuban Linx... Pt. II is the fourth studio album by American rapper and Wu-Tang Clan member Raekwon. It was released in the United States on September 8, 2009, through Ice H20 and EMI Records. The album experienced numerous delays to its release due to Raekwon's approach of continual rewriting, as well as distribution issues with his record labels. Serving as the sequel to his critically acclaimed debut album Only Built 4 Cuban Linx... (1995), Pt. II maintains many of the themes covered on its predecessor, and features guest appearances from several Wu-Tang Clan members, as well as Busta Rhymes, Jadakiss and Beanie Sigel.

The album debuted at number four on the Billboard 200 and at number two on the Top R&B/Hip-Hop Albums chart, while selling near 68,000 copies in its first week. Upon its release, Only Built 4 Cuban Linx... Pt. II received widespread acclaim from music critics, based on an aggregate score of 88/100 from Metacritic, indicating "universal acclaim", and was ranked number 45 on the site's list of best-reviewed albums. Only Built 4 Cuban Linx... Pt. II was included on several publications' year-end album lists, including Rolling Stone, which ranked it the twenty-fifth best album of 2009, and Time, which named it seventh-best.

== Background ==
Only Built 4 Cuban Linx... Pt. II was originally announced in late 2005, when it was stated that Busta Rhymes would be executive producer on the album. Although Raekwon would spend several years re-working and writing the album, it was announced in January 2006 that it was finished, with production being largely credited to RZA, with RZA and Busta Rhymes as executive producers. Later in 2006, it was revealed that Wu-Tang Clan members GZA and Inspectah Deck would be featured, returning with their Wu-Gambino personas.

Busta Rhymes' influence on the project became more solidified when it was announced that Raekwon had signed a contract with Dr. Dre's label Aftermath Entertainment, to which Busta was signed. The deal was structured so that the release would be a joint venture between Wu-Tang Records and Aftermath Entertainment. After a period of time and reported delays in the recording process, the two parties eventually separated from the original agreement. The decision came after it was revealed that Dr. Dre had reportedly become creatively tied up with his personal Detox record. Raekwon revealed in an interview that Cuban Linx Pt. II would not be released on Aftermath, stating "Dr. Dre is a busy man and may not have the time to give the album his full attention." An insider from Aftermath spoke on this matter, stating "The Raekwon album came in done. It's finished! It's a finished record. Dre did two records. We were doing the deal, and during the deal the Christmas break came. We took a break for two weeks—came back—Dre acted like we never spoke! I was like, 'All right, this Raekwon thing,' and he's like, 'Nah, I ain't fuckin' with that no more.' In a Complex track interview, Raekwon revealed that a third Dr. Dre track was made for the album that did not make the final cut, but wishes to possibly put it on one of his future albums.

By 2007, Only Built 4 Cuban Linx... Pt. II had still not been released, and was ranked the sixth most anticipated album of 2007 by XXL magazine. The album would be pushed back several more times, and numerous changes would be made to its release date. By mid-2007, the songs "Baggage Handlers" (produced by J Dilla) and "State of Grace" (produced by RZA) were leaked on the internet. Although they were originally intended to be included on Only Built 4 Cuban Linx... Pt. II, they were cut from the final version.

Near the end of 2007, the Wu-Tang Clan began writing and recording their fifth studio album 8 Diagrams, which slowed the recording process even further for Cuban Linx II. Wu-Tang group leader RZA came under attack from members Ghostface Killah and Raekwon over 8 Diagrams' production, with Raekwon going as far as to say that he would not include any of RZA's production on the album. In an interview with AllHipHop, Raekwon commented "(On 8 Diagrams), whatever else he wanted to grow on, we weren't crazy over it. And that's the whole thing people took out of context. No one tried to take anything away from RZA as a producer. It was more or less you can't be selfish, and have to work with everybody's ears and eyes on something. Him being the dude that he is with mad platinum albums, some niggas be super cocky. 'I don't wanna hear nothing, I got this.' That's what happened in that situation." By early 2008, Raekwon and RZA settled their creative differences, with Raekwon choosing to work with RZA again.

While the album was not talked about much in 2008, Raekwon stated in an interview with DJ Semtex that it was set for release in February 2009, as he claimed it could be ready at that point. This release date, however, would prove to be once again postponed as he would continue to fine-tune the album and add more material.

The album's first single, originally entitled "Wu Ooh" and later retitled "New Wu", was released for playback on various radio mixshows, including New York's Hot 97, with an official video being released on the internet in May 2009. The video features Ghostface Killah and Method Man, who rap their verses respectively, as well as guest appearances from The Alchemist, RZA, Cappadonna, Inspectah Deck and other Wu-Tang affiliates such as Popa Wu. Around this time, Raekwon announced that the album would be released through his own label, Icewater Records, with him later confirming EMI as another label that the album would be released on.

According to an April 2009 report by XXL on Busta Rhymes leaving Aftermath and the album project, Busta Rhymes "was originally slated to executive produce the project, although he no longer holds the position". Raekwon said in an interview for XXL, "Busta left after our situation was already not gonna happen. Busta might have felt like he was getting the proper energy he needed to get, so really one ain't have nothing to do with two, but you never know at the end of the day, you know what I mean. I don't know, I can't call that". However, Busta Rhymes received credit for executive producer on the album. In the same interview, it was stated that the album would be released on August 11, 2009. Raekwon later announced that due to a leak of the song "Surgical Gloves," as well as sample clearance issues, Only Built 4 Cuban Linx... Pt. II would be pushed back once again to September 8, 2009.

Expectations grew high for the album as music writers reported various guests and producers to the project. An all-star cast of rappers and producers appeared on the record, but several of these reported collaborations did not come to fruition or did not make the final cut. Among these are the Bun B collaboration "Never Used to Matter," the Nas collaboration to commemorate his appearance on the first Only Built 4 Cuban Linx..., and also, guest appearances from The Game and Travis Barker.

== Music ==
=== Structure and lyricism ===
Only Built 4 Cuban Linx... Pt. II follows a similar crime laced cinematic approach as the original Cuban Linx. In maintaining the structure and concept of its predecessor, Pt. II contains a loose storyline of a mafioso crime boss, as told mainly from the first person point of view. This is combined with carefully placed skits weaved into the beginnings and ends of songs.

In contrast to the first album/story where the main character is attempting to leave behind a criminal life, here, he has seemingly embraced this life. The narrative has these older characters taking a look back at their pitfalls and spoils as they have finally risen to the top. In his review for Los Angeles Times, Jeff Weiss wrote "While many of their '90s peers recycle toothless tautologies about bringing New York back or vainly wrestle with advanced age by collaborating with flavor-of-the-minute flotsam and jetsam, Raekwon and Ghostface Killah refuse to stay forever young. Proudly profane, the two come off as salty mafia dons with long memories, too old to change their ways but with the narrative skill and eye for detail of master storytellers in their prime."

The album's final track, "Kiss The Ring" has Wu-Tang member Masta Killa summarizing the loose concept of the story and closing the album in a film-like fashion.

=== Production ===
Announced producers were confirmed to include RZA, J Dilla, Dr. Dre, Erick Sermon, Mathematics; Marley Marl, Scram Jones, Pete Rock and The Alchemist.

Initially, there was speculation as to what RZA's role would be on Pt. II, being that he was the only producer and executive producer on the first Cuban Linx album. Raekwon had commented early on that the sequel would be different in this light, stating "(RZA) definitely put his two cents in and made his elements, and that's what it's about. But I can't allow one man to lead my destiny no more." Raekwon spoke on the difficulties of working on the project with the legendary producer:

One thing about RZA is he's like the Wizard of Oz. He'll give what he feels like giving you, but he has other shit that he doesn't really admire too much because it doesn't represent his growth and development process. I knew he already had it; it's just hard to get him to go back into his bag of goodies because he's so used to dealing with another bag right now. I felt like 'yo, I want this sound.' But he was like 'this is going to be the new sound!' So now it happens to be a want situation. RZA is the type where you'll ask for this, and he'll give you something else. But he always has what you want. You may have to search for a little bit, do some soul searching, but you'll find what you need. That's what happened on Cuban Linx II. I got what I needed from him for my shit.

— Raekwon

During the 2009 Rock the Bells festival, Raekwon discussed the importance of getting the right producers on board with the project, "I allowed myself to track down some of the finest niggas in the game that done it and basically get them involved with the project. RZA was always there to do whatever, whatever... but at the same token I wanted more. You know what I mean, I wanted to go out and challenge myself even more with different production and different producers."

Raekwon spoke on what it was like getting the opportunity to rhyme over the late J Dilla's production, commenting "He's like a Dre and a RZA, like a combo. You know what I mean and I think that he didn't really get the full fledged support that he's supposed to get. But, in my book, he's that Nigga. And he came with the flamers!" He also stated in an interview with Okayplayer "Dilla, he's a musical maestro, a Quincy Jones in his own world. I did not know his power until I listened to his catalog. He played his part in hip-hop. I'm glad to be involved with him. It was a blessing. He stepped his grizzly up for me. He gave the tracks that special blend. Thanks to Busta for making it happen. I got this while Dilla was still alive. I worked with the best, it was bound to happen. I really appreciated his energy."

== Release ==
On July 22, 2009, a report was published which claimed numerous collaborations, final track names, and producers. A month later on August 27, another report was published featuring the final track listing. The two reports listed most of the same tracks, but with slight differences in names, producers, and featured guests. The change lead to the perception that there were many tracks cut from the final listing, however it is more likely that the details were transcribed incorrectly as most of the tracks listed were released in some form. The final album differed from the initial report as follows:

- "Godfather" was retitled "Black Mozart" (was previously a solo track called "Secret Indictment").
- "40 Deuce" was retitled "Broken Safety".
- "Wu Ooh" was retitled "New Wu".
- "Nigga Me" was retitled "About Me".
- "Catalina" was originally "Congo".
- "Kareem Khan" was retitled "We Will Rob You".
- "Walk Wit Me" was changed to a European/iTunes Bonus track.
- "Sonny's Missing" was originally the Pete Rock track "Questions," which featured vocals by Royal Flush, from the album NY's Finest.
- "10 Bricks" instrumental was originally used for the J Dilla remix track to Jaylib's "The Red", released on the 2007 reissue of Champion Sound.

"Criminology 09" featuring Ghostface Killah, and "Rock Stars" featuring Inspectah Deck and GZA were the only songs listed in the report that did not make the final line-up. "Criminology 09" had been earlier leaked and discussed by Raekwon as being included on the album. It would, however, be included on the Method Man, Ghostface Killah and Raekwon collaboration album Wu-Massacre, with Raekwon's verse cut in place of a new verse by Method Man. An additional song was added to the August report and remained on the final line-up, titled "Baggin Crack," which was produced by Erick Sermon. It is only available on the explicit version of the album.

=== Video ===
A music video was released of "New Wu" months before the release of the album. Two different versions of the video were made, both of a similar style. The first official video has Raekwon and several Wu-Tang members interrogating a suspicious man thought to be an undercover cop.

As the supporting single for the album, an animated video for "House of Flying Daggers" was released. The video was illustrated by 1000styles, animated by Ryan Johnson and Drew Taylor and directed by "The Chain Gang" (Erick Sasso and Brian Wendelken). The video is based on the 1978 cult classic film Five Deadly Venoms. In the video, RZA and J Dilla (portrayed as monks) are given word of a massacre at Shaolin. They tell the messenger that it was not the work of thousands of warriors or The Hunter; it was only five. The song then starts, depicting Raekwon, Inspectah Deck, GZA, Ghostface Killah and Method Man destroying evil warriors. They then defeat the hunter, who is killed by RZA. The "House Of Flying Daggers" video was ranked #1 in TIME Magazine's "Best Videos of 2009."

A week before the album's release, the video for "Walk Wit Me" was released. Several other music videos have been made since, such as "Catalina," "Have Mercy," "Surgical Gloves", "Pyrex Vision", "Canal Street", and "Ason Jones."

=== Gold Edition ===
A bonus version entitled "Gold Edition" was released on August 17, 2010, as an iTunes exclusive. It includes the original album, plus remixes of "Broken Safety", "New Wu", "Penitentiary" — titled "Penitentiary (Travis Barker Mix)" — and "About Me" featuring The Game. As bonus tracks, it includes the Scram Jones-produced "Never Used to Matter" featuring Bun B and the RZA-produced "Rock Stars" with GZA and Inspectah Deck.

== Reception ==
=== Commercial performance ===
Only Built 4 Cuban Linx... Pt. II was released on September 8, 2009, and was ranked the number one downloaded album available on iTunes for the first three days of its release. It debuted at number 4 on the Billboard 200 and at number 2 on the Top R&B/Hip-Hop Albums chart, the same positioning as the original Only Built 4 Cuban Linx..., while selling near 68,000 copies in its first week. Only Built 4 Cuban Linx... Pt. II has sold 132,000 copies in the United States as of November 12, 2009, according to SoundScan.

=== Critical response ===
Professional ratings
Aggregate scores
Source	Rating
AnyDecentMusic?	7.8/10
Metacritic	88/100
Review scores
Source	Rating
AllMusic	4/5 stars
The A.V. Club	A−
The Irish Times	4/5 stars
Los Angeles Times	3.5/4 stars
Mojo	4/5 stars
Pitchfork	8.8/10
Rolling Stone	4/5 stars
Spin	7/10
URB	4.5/5 stars
USA Today	3.5/4 stars

Only Built 4 Cuban Linx... Pt. II received widespread acclaim from music critics. At Metacritic, which assigns a normalized rating out of 100 to reviews from mainstream critics, the album received an average score of 88, based on 19 reviews, which indicates "universal acclaim". According to the site, it was the fourth-best reviewed album of 2009, and it is listed as the forty-sixth best reviewed album on the site. David Jeffries of AllMusic lauded Raekwon's lyrical ability, writing that he is "in top form, spitting out rhymes worthy of the Wu logo", while calling its production "equally magnificent". The A.V. Club's Nathan Rabin praised the album's "vivid crime-world narratives rich in pulpy detail". Tiny Mix Tapes wrote that the album meets the "charged" expectations of a sequel to the original and called it "dense, dignified" and "flat-out SOLID". The New York Times's Jon Caramanica called the album "impressive" and stated "That it's inconsistent with everything in hip-hop that surrounds it only adds to the album's charm". Michael Saba of Paste called it "a classic, and one of the best albums to come out of the New York rap scene in the last decade". Toronto Star writer Corey Mintz commended Raekwon for his ability as an emcee, writing "Raekwon still simmers with the same confident tempo, as if never breathing in or out". Sobhi Abdul-Rakhman of Sputnikmusic gave the album a rave review and found it accomplished in all its aspects, stating:

Every cut is worth its weight here; every lyrical performance is equally inspired as its production counterpart ... Everything about Only Built 4 Cuban Linx Pt. II demands worship and solidifies Raekwon as one of history's best with a continuation that exceeds his original debut in every way imaginable. This is a more mature and intelligent Wu Tang and proves that one truly does improve their verbal skills with age.

— Sobhi Abdul-Rakhman

Los Angeles Times writer Jeff Weiss commended the album's incorporation of various producers, noting its effect as "analogous to the hip-hop version of 'The Departed': filled with virtuosic star-studded performances, heavily indebted to Asian cinema, and tweaking rather than transforming a timeless aesthetic". Steve Jones of USA Today called its cinematic crime narratives "riveting". Henry Adaso of About.com commended Ghostface Killah for his contributions to the album and gave it 4 out of 5 stars. Chris Ryan of Spin gave the album 3½ out of 5 stars and praised Raekwon's lyricism, writing that the album's songs "contain some of his most rewind-worthy bars in years". The University of California, Berkeley's student publication, The Daily Californian, complimented the album's production as diverse but seamless, writing that "Pt. II displays a dizzying roster of 13 producers ... each with well-established and distinct takes on their craft. Rather than playing out as some sort of haphazard compilation, the album flows seamlessly. The myriad of producers didn't work together, but somehow they all managed to end up on the same page. If anything, this is what makes Only Built 4 Cuban Linx ... Pt. II so fantastic". Rob Browning of PopMatters praised its cohesive structure and wrote that it "is intended to be listened to as a single entity". Pitchfork's Nate Patrin called Only Built 4 Cuban Linx... Pt. II "as good as fans have been hoping for" and compared it to Ghostface Killah's Fishscale (2006), writing that "Like Ghostface's modern classic, this album defies hip-hop's current atmosphere of youthful cockiness and aging complacency".

=== Accolades ===
The album was named one of the top-ten best albums of the year by several publications. It was ranked number five on Pitchfork's list of Top 50 Albums of 2009. Slant Magazine and The New York Times both named it the eighth-best album of the year. In December 2009, Pt. II was chosen as 'Album of the Year' in the Hip Hop DX countdown, and was described as "...the Hip Hop equivalent to The Godfather 2, with Rae as revitalized as Marlon was." Raekwon himself was selected as Best Emcee of 2009 (fellow New Yorker Nas won in 2008.) The DX staff justified this pick with this description of Raekwon's career in 2009. PopMatters ranked Only Built 4 Cuban Linx... Pt. II at number seven on their 60 Best Albums of 2009 (making it the highest ranked hip-hop album on the list), and commented; "Everyone here is at the top of their game, leading by example and calling out to the rest of mainstream hip-hop. Really no other hip-hop album stood a chance up against Only Built 4 Cuban Linx... Part II." The popular Norwegian news-paper Dagbladet named it the ninth international album of 2009. Also, the music retail company Platekompaniet ranked the album sixteenth album of 2009.

== Track listing ==
Only Built 4 Cuban Linx... Pt. II
No.	Title	Writer(s)	Producer(s)	Length
1.	"Return of the North Star" (featuring Popa Wu)	Corey Woods; David Turner	BT	2:39
2.	"House of Flying Daggers" (featuring Inspectah Deck, Ghostface Killah and Method Man)	Woods; Jason Hunter; Dennis Coles; Clifford Smith, Jr.; James Yancy	J Dilla	3:51
3.	"Sonny's Missing"	Woods; Peter Phillips	Pete Rock	2:28
4.	"Pyrex Vision"	Woods; Marlon Williams	Marley Marl	0:54
5.	"Cold Outside" (featuring Ghostface Killah and Suga Bang Bang)	Woods; Coles	Icewater Productions	4:40
6.	"Black Mozart" (featuring Inspectah Deck, RZA and Tash Mahogany)	Woods; Hunter; Robert Diggs	RZA	3:24
7.	"Gihad" (featuring Ghostface Killah)	Woods; Coles; Ron Braunstein	Necro	2:57
8.	"New Wu" (featuring Ghostface Killah and Method Man)	Woods; Coles; Smith; Diggs	RZA	3:50
9.	"Penitentiary" (featuring Ghostface Killah)	Woods; Coles	BT	2:35
10.	"Baggin Crack"	Woods; Erick Sermon	Erick Sermon	1:58
11.	"Surgical Gloves"	Woods; Alan Maman	The Alchemist	3:24
12.	"Broken Safety" (featuring Jadakiss and Styles P)	Woods; Jason Phillips; David Styles; Marc Shemer	Scram Jones	2:45
13.	"Canal Street"	Woods	Icewater Productions	3:37
14.	"Ason Jones"	Woods; Yancy	J Dilla	3:06
15.	"Have Mercy" (featuring Beanie Sigel and Blue Raspberry)	Woods; Dwight Grant	MoSS	3:51
16.	"10 Bricks" (featuring Cappadonna and Ghostface Killah)	Woods; Darryl Hill; Coles; Yancy	J Dilla	3:16
17.	"Fat Lady Sings"	Woods	True Master	2:17
18.	"Catalina" (featuring Lyfe Jennings)	Woods; Chester Jennings; Andre Young; Mark Batson; Dawaun Parker; Sean Cruse	Dr. Dre; Mark Batson	3:28
19.	"We Will Rob You" (featuring GZA, Masta Killa and Slick Rick)	Woods; Gary Grice; Richard Walters; Elgin Turner	Justice Kareem	3:15
20.	"About Me" (featuring Busta Rhymes)	Woods; Trevor Smith; Young; Batson; Parker	Dr. Dre; Mark Batson	3:59
21.	"Mean Streets" (featuring Inspectah Deck, Ghostface Killah and Suga Bang Bang)	Woods; Hunter; Ronald Bean	Mathematics	4:29
22.	"Kiss the Ring" (featuring Inspectah Deck and Masta Killa)	Woods; Hunter; Turner; Elton John; Shemer	Scram Jones	4:09
Total length:				70:52

iTunes and European bonus tracks
No.	Title	Writer(s)	Producer(s)	Length
23.	"Walk Wit Me"	Woods	Scram Jones	4:18
24.	"The Badlands" (featuring Ghostface Killah)	Woods; Coles	BT	2:30
Total length:				77:40

iTunes Gold Deluxe Edition bonus tracks
No.	Title	Writer(s)	Producer(s)	Length
25.	"About Me (Original)" (featuring The Game)	Woods; Jayceon Taylor	Dr. Dre; Mark Batson	4:16
26.	"New Wu (Remix)" (featuring Ghostface Killah and Method Man)	Woods; Coles; Smith, Jr.	BT	3:59
27.	"Broken Safety (Remix)" (featuring Jadakiss and Styles P)	Woods; Phillips; Styles	BT	2:37
28.	"Penitentiary (Travis Barker Mix)" (featuring Ghostface Killah)	Woods; Coles	Travis Barker; BT	2:37
29.	"Never Used to Matter" (featuring Bun B)	Woods; Bernard Freeman	Scram Jones	2:33
30.	"Rockstars" (featuring Inspectah Deck, GZA, Thea Van Seijen and Stone Mecca)	Woods; Hunter; Grice; Thea Van Seijen; James Rabb	RZA	4:13
Total length:				87:55

Samples

- "Return of the North Star" contains samples from "North Star" by Raekwon, "Have Mercy" by Raekwon and "Mellow Mood Part I" by Barry White.
- "House of Flying Daggers" contains a sample from "Eleanor Rigby" by Four Tops and dialogue from the film Shaolin Vs Lama.
- "Sonny's Missing" contains a sample from "Exercise Run" by Coleridge-Taylor Perkinson and dialogue from the film The Killer.
- "Pyrex Vision" contains a sample from "Changing Face" by J.J. Band.
- "Black Mozart" contains a sample from "Theme from The Godfather" by The Professionals.
- "New Wu" contains a sample from "I've Changed" by The Magictones.
- "Penitentiary" contains a sample from "Hit or Miss" by Odetta.
- "Surgical Gloves" contains a sample from "Castle Walls" by Styx.
- "Canal Street" contains a sample from "Stop! in the Name of Love" by Margie Joseph.
- "Ason Jones" contains a sample from "You Are Just A Living Doll" by J.J. Barnes.
- "Have Mercy" contains a sample from "Have Mercy On Me" by The East St. Louis Gospelettes.
- "10 Bricks" contains samples from "War of the Gods" by Billy Paul and "You Got the Love I Need" by Smokey Robinson & The Miracles.
- "Fat Lady Sings" contains a sample from "If This World Were Mine" by Zulema.
- "Catalina" contains a sample of "Rainy Dayz" by Raekwon and dialogue and score from the film The Killer.
- "We Will Rob You" contains samples from "Across 110th Street" by Bobby Womack, "Hard Times" by Baby Huey and "Children's Story" by Slick Rick.
- "Mean Streets" contains a sample from "The Door to Your Heart" by The Dramatics.
- "Kiss the Ring" contains a sample from "New Wu" by Raekwon and "Goodbye Yellow Brick Road" by Elton John.
- "Walk Wit Me" contains a sample from "Guillotine (Swordz)" by Raekwon.
- "New Wu (Remix)" contains a sample from "Daytona 500" by Ghostface Killah.
- "Rockstars" contains a sample from "The Woman Don't Live Here No More" by Otis Clay.

== Personnel ==
Credits for Only Built 4 Cuban Linx... Pt. II adapted from liner notes.

- Raekwon as Lex Diamonds - performer, executive producer
- Ghostface Killah as Tony Starks - performer
- RZA as Bobby Steels - performer, producer, executive producer
- Inspectah Deck as Rollie Fingers - performer
- Masta Killa as Noodles - performer
- Method Man as Johnny Blaze - performer
- GZA as Maximillion - performer
- Cappadonna as Cappachino - performer
- Jadakiss as Montega Jada - performer
- Beanie Sigel as Mack Mittens - performer
- Styles P as Styles Pinero - performer
- Busta Rhymes - performer
- Blue Raspberry - vocals
- Popa Wu - vocals
- Slick Rick - vocals
- Suga Bang Bang - vocals
- Tash Mahogany - vocals
- Lyfe Jennings - vocals
- Sean Cruse - bass
- Dawaun Parker - keyboards
- Che Pope - keyboards
- J Dilla - producer
- Icewater Productions - producer
- Dr. Dre - producer
- Mark Batson - producer, keyboards
- BT - producer, engineer
- Scram Jones - producer, engineer
- True Master - producer
- Mathematics - producer
- Pete Rock - producer
- Marley Marl - producer
- Erick Sermon - producer
- The Alchemist - producer
- MoSS - producer
- Allah Justice - producer
- Necro - producer
- Travis Barker - producer
- Glen Marchese - mixing
- Kareem Woods - co executive producer
- Mel Carter - co executive producer
- Mark B. Christensen - master
- Ted Michaels - A&R
- Jon Prince - A&R
- Stan Beatty - A&R
- Danny Hastings - photography
- Tom Medevich - photography
- Sean Frigot - design
- Metro Ink - album layout

== Charts ==
=== Weekly charts ===
Chart (2009)	Peak position
US Billboard 200	4
US Top R&B/Hip-Hop Albums (Billboard)	2
US Top Rap Albums (Billboard)	2

=== Year-end charts ===
Chart (2009)	Position
US Top R&B/Hip-Hop Albums (Billboard)	52
