= The Mix Tape, Vol. II =

The Mix Tape, Volume II: 60 Minutes of Funk

Mixtape by Funkmaster Flex
- Released: February 11, 1997
- Studio: D&D Studios (New York, NY)
- Genre: East Coast hip hop; hardcore; freestyle rap; funk; R&B
- Length: 1:22:42
- Label: Loud
- Producer: Jessica Rosenblum (exec.); Funkmaster Flex (also exec.)

Funkmaster Flex chronology
The Mix Tape, Volume 1: 60 Minutes of Funk (1995)	The Mix Tape, Volume II: 60 Minutes of Funk (1997)	The Mix Tape, Volume III: 60 Minutes of Funk (The Final Chapter) (1998)

Professional ratings
Review scores
Source	Rating
AllMusic	4/5 stars
Muzik	7/10

The Mix Tape, Volume II: 60 Minutes of Funk is a mixtape by American DJ Funkmaster Flex. It was released on February 11, 1997 via Loud/RCA Records, serving as a sequel to his 1995 The Mix Tape Volume 1 (60 Minutes of Funk) and the second installment in his 60 Minute of Funk mixtape series. Like his previous Mix Tape release, this album is a compilation of freestyles and previously released songs mixed together by Funk Flex.

The album was a success, peaking at 19 on the Billboard 200, an 89-spot increase from his previous album, and No. 2 on the Top R&B/Hip-Hop Albums, held from the top spot by Erykah Badu's Baduizm. Less than two months after its release, the album was certified gold by the Recording Industry Association of America for sales of 500,000 copies, becoming the first of four consecutive gold albums for Flex.

== Track listing ==
No.	Title	Performer(s)	Length
1.	"Talkin' Shit"	Veronica Webb and Jermaine Dupri	3:29
2.	"Let Me Clear My Throat"	DJ Kool	0:29
3.	"I'm Not Feeling You"	Yvette Michele	3:18
4.	"Freestyle"	Jay-Z	2:27
5.	"How About Some Hardcore"	M.O.P.	1:03
6.	"Freestyle"	Lil' Kim	1:57
7.	"Tour"	Capleton	1:15
8.	"Freestyle"	Lady Saw	1:32
9.	"Let Me Clear My Throat"	DJ Kool	1:02
10.	"Freestyle"	Nas	1:28
11.	"Freestyle"	Foxy Brown	1:28
12.	"Hip Hop Hooray"	Naughty by Nature	0:20
13.	"Uptown Anthem"	Naughty by Nature	1:26
14.	"How I Could Just Kill a Man"	Cypress Hill	1:05
15.	"Time 4 Sum Aksion"	Redman	1:21
16.	"Freestyle"	Redman	1:23
17.	"Freestyle"	Ras-T	1:37
18.	"Freestyle"	Michelob	1:28
19.	"Set It Off"	Greg Nice	0:21
20.	"Flash Light"	Parliament	1:14
21.	"Outstanding"	The Gap Band	1:16
22.	"Rising to the Top"	Keni Burke	1:49
23.	"Freestyle"	DAV	1:19
24.	"Freestyle"	Mary J. Blige	1:26
25.	"Relax and Party"	Ivory	3:20
26.	"Crowd Participation"	DJ Flexxx	3:28
27.	"No Joke / Follow Me"	Buckshot	1:59
28.	"Freestyle"	Boot Camp Clik	7:58
29.	"Freestyle"	Akinyele	2:11
30.	"Method Man"	Wu-Tang Clan	0:30
31.	"Freestyle"	The Notorious B.I.G. and The LOX	2:50
32.	"Freestyle"	Puff Daddy and Ma$e	2:02
33.	"Front Lines (Hell on Earth)" / "Seven Minutes of Funk"	Mobb Deep / The Whole Darn Family	1:09
34.	"Freestyle"	Lost Boyz	1:37
35.	"Release Yo' Delf"	Method Man	0:11
36.	"Freestyle"	PMD and Hit Squad	1:53
37.	"Freestyle"	Xzibit	1:16
38.	"Freestyle"	Cormega	1:25
39.	"Let Me Clear My Throat"	DJ Kool	0:19
40.	"Sucker M.C.'s"	Run–D.M.C.	0:40
41.	"Back to Life (However Do You Want Me)"	Soul II Soul	1:18
42.	"Here We Go"	Run–D.M.C.	0:24
43.	"Mona Lisa"	Slick Rick	1:28
44.	"Flex Outro"	Funkmaster Flex	0:10
Total length:			1:22:42

== Charts ==
=== Weekly charts ===
Chart (1997)	Peak position
New Zealand Albums (RMNZ)	33
US Billboard 200	19
US Top R&B/Hip-Hop Albums (Billboard)	2

=== Year-end charts ===
Chart (1997)	Position
US Billboard 200	194
US Top R&B/Hip-Hop Albums (Billboard)	53

== Certifications ==
Region	Certification	Certified units/sales
United States (RIAA)	Gold	500,000^{^}
^{^} Shipments figures based on certification alone.
