= Raz Fresco =

Canadian rapper and producer (born 1995)

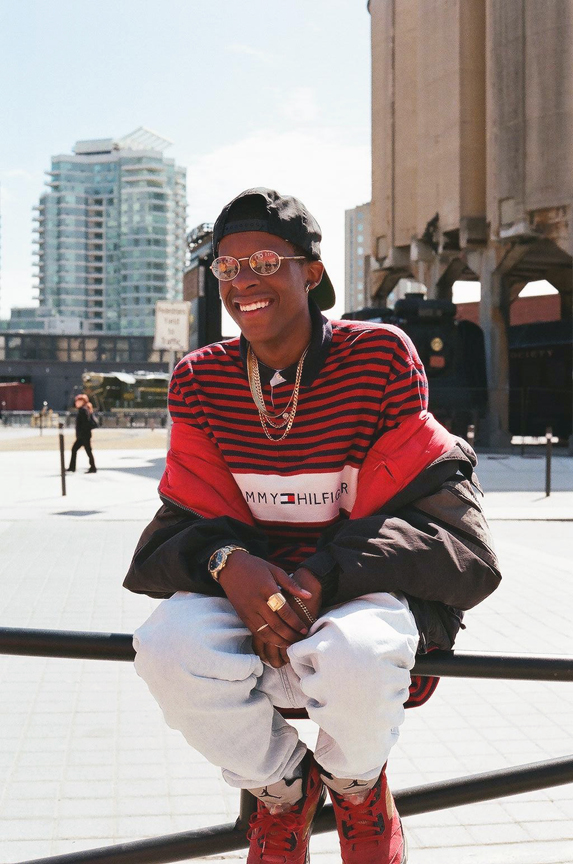
- Raz Fresco in 2012

Background information
- Also known as: I-Power Allah
- Born: Rasquiz Alfred Johnson; January 27, 1995 (age 31); Toronto, Ontario, Canada
- Origin: Brampton, Ontario, Canada
- Genres: Hip hop
- Occupations: Rapper, producer
- Years active: 2009 - present
- Labels: Bakers Club Records, Duck Down

Rasquiz Alfred Johnson (born January 27, 1995), better known by his stage name, Raz Fresco, is a Canadian rapper and record producer from Brampton, Ontario. He is a member of the hip hop collective Bakersclub, with whom he has released four mixtapes. Raz is currently working on his "Magneto Was Right" project that is currently on its ninth issue.

Raz Fresco has worked with popular artists such as Raekwon, Bishop Nehru, Tyga, Big Sean, B.o.B, Wale, French Montana, and Mac Miller.

== Life and career ==
=== Early life and musical beginnings ===
Raz Fresco was born in Toronto, Ontario to Jamaican parents Sandra Charlton and William Johnson. He moved to Mississauga, Ontario shortly after his dad was deported and then moved to Brampton, Ontario, where he attended St. Edmund Campion. He is the nephew of dub and roots reggae artist Earl Zero. When Raz was in the 2nd grade he began to write rap lyrics to beats he would find online. Raz began producing his own beats in the 7th grade.

=== 2010-2011: Laced Up and MCMXCV ===
After the release of Welcome To The Bakersclub, Raz was flown out to Atlanta, Georgia to sign a management contract with The Commission. Later in 2010, Raz released his second mixtape Laced Up. In June 2011, Raz released his third mixtape MCMXCV which was hosted by Don Cannon. The mixtape was well received generating over 15,000 downloads within the first week.

=== 2012-present: CakeyPocket$, No Hookz, The Popcorn Tape, & Pablo/Frescobar ===
Shortly after the release of MCMXCV Fresco began CakeyPocket$, his first entirely self-produced project. A consistent visual campaign of 8 videos gained Raz more notoriety on popular hip hop sites and news outlets such as Complex, Noisey, Vibe and XXL. The mixtape was also nominated for Artist Mixtape of The Year at the 2012 Stylus Awards. In the winter of 2012 Raz dropped No Hookz with Bakersclub artist Chill Will. This served as a prelude to their full length collaborative project The Popcorn Tape which was released in January 2013. In the winter of 2013 Raz produced Bishop Nehru's Mobb Dizzle for the NBA Live 14 soundtrack. Raz's debut album entitled Pablo Frescobar was released in 2015.

== Personal life ==
Fresco is a member of the Five-Percent Nation and goes by the name I Power Allah, stating with in an interview with Vice.com:

"I met Born King, my educator within the Five-Percent Nation, in 2014 and was introduced to the Nation properly through him. However, I didn’t just join right away. Born King and I remained in contact and I kept studying and learning (and) I eventually realized the Five-Percent Nation of Gods and Earths had the same objectives that I had...(and) the fact that you had to internalize your lessons and thousands of years of history and science was something I saw as key to me being a dope MC and being able to drop it in my bars cleverly for kids to soak up....”

== Discography ==
=== Solo Projects ===
- Welcome To The Bakers Club (2010)
- Laced Up (2010)
- MCMXCV (2011)
- CakeyPocket$ (2012)
- The Screwface Tape (2014)
- Pablo Frescobar (2015)
- How U Survive Through Life Everyday (H.U.S.T.L.E.) (2017)
- God Made Devil - EP (2018)
- 410 North (2018)
- No Deal Peel (2019)
- Deluxe Hilfiger Regalia (2019)
- Magneto Was Right Issue #1 (2020)
- Magneto Was Right Issue #2 (2020)
- Magneto Was Right Issue #3 (2020)
- Magneto Was Right Issue #4 (2020)
- Magneto Was Right Issue #5 (2020)
- Magneto Was Right Issue #6 (2020)
- Magneto Was Right Issue #7 (2020)
- Magneto Was Right Issue #8 (2021)
- Magneto Was Right Issue #9 (2021)
- Pocket Operations (2022)
- Magnetic (2022)
- Marvelous Right Wrist (2022)
- Arm Leg Leg Arm Head = ALLAH (2022)
- pocket operations II: forty seconds only (2023)
- Pocket Operations III (2024)
- Why Equals Self (2026)

=== Collaborative Projects ===
- No Hookz (w/ ChillxWill) (2012)
- The Popcorn Tape (w/ ChillxWill) (2013)
- Brother From Another (w/ The 6th Letter) (2019)
- Truth Is Stranger Than Fiction (w/ BriskInTheHouse) (2019)
- Gorgeous Polo Sportsmen (w/ Futurewave) (2020)
- SUNray (w/ Ray Robinson) (2021)
- Alkmy (w/ ALS) (2021)
- Secret Wars (w/ Dibia$e) (2021)
- Boulangerie (w/ Nicholas Craven) (2022)
- Boost for Breakfast (w/ Funk Lo) (2022)
- GRIPTAPE (w/ Eric Right & Gritfall) (2022)
- SOLRAP! (w/ ALS) (2023)
- Piñata Cake (w/ ALS) (2023)
- 777 (w/ Figub Brazlevic) (2023)
- Gia... À La Carte (w/ Estee Nack & Nicholas Craven) (2023)
- Bakin Soul (w/ Cookin Soul) (2024)
- Northside (w/ Daniel Son) (2024)
- The Eternal Now (w/ DJ Muggs) (2024)
- Knockout (w/ Dibia$e) (2024)
- Stadium Lo Champions (w/ Futurewave) (2025)

=== Production discography ===
- Tyga – Black Thoughts (2009)

Track 01. "Black Thoughts" & Track 05. "Heaven or Hell"

- Mac Miller (2010)

"Trippin Out"

- French Montana – Mister 16: Casino Life (2011)

Track 05. "What They Talking About"

- DJ Holiday (2011)

"First Class" (feat. Wale, Big Sean, B.O.B., & Chill Will)

- Bishop Nehru - Nehruvia (2013)

Track 08. "Moon & Stars" (feat. Raz Fresco)

- The 6th Letter - NorthernPlayalisticGetHighMuzik Vol. 1

Track 01. "Gin 'N Juice '14", Track 02. "Take A Hit Pt. II", Track 03. "Still Twistin'" (feat. Raz Fresco), Track 04. "1992", Track 05. "Chain Smokin'" (Scratches By DJ Corey Grand & AptOne), Track 06. "WEED RAP", Track 07. "A Dollar & A Dream" (feat. BriskInTheHouse & The Foreigners), Track 08. partyandBULLshit, Tack 09. "4daCREAM" (feat. Jimmy Johnson), Track 10. "Mic CHECK" (feat. Fabrashay A), Track 11. "Bakin' Up" (feat. Lo Thraxx), Track 12. "Blue Chee$e" (feat. ChillxWill), Track 13. "Nag Champa Interlude", & Track 14. "Audi 5000" (feat. P. Blackk & Brandon Chey)

- Sir Michael Rocks

Tris J Ft. Sir Michael Rocks "Wheelin Dealin"
