= Pablo Frescobar =

Studio album by Raz Fresco
- Released: July 1, 2015
- Recorded: 2013–15
- Genre: Hip hop
- Length: 66:00
- Label: Black Light, Duck Down, Bakers Club Records
- Producer: Raz Fresco (exec.), Duck Down (exec.), Drago

Raz Fresco chronology
The Screwface Tape (2014)	Pablo Frescobar (2015)

Singles from Pablo Frescobar
- 1. "Warning Shots / Murda" Released: March 4, 2015; 2. "Influenza" Released: March 26, 2015; 3. "Equinox" Released: April 22, 2015; 4. "Screwface City" Released: May 21, 2015; 5. "Cortez Nikes" Released: June 16, 2015; 6. "Up North" Released: July 1, 2015

Professional ratings
Review scores
Source	Rating
Exclaim!	8/10

Pablo Frescobar is the debut independent album by Canadian rapper Raz Fresco. The album was released on July 1, 2015, by Black Light Music, Duck Down Music Inc. and Bakers Club Records. The album features guest appearances by Bakers Club members The 6th Letter, and Lo Thraxx, along with Raekwon, Chuck Inglish, Bishop Nehru, and Tre Mission. It was supported by the singles "Warning Shots / Murda", "Influenza Featuring Raekwon", "Equinox Featuring Bishop Nehru", "Screwface City", "Cortez Nikes Featuring Chuck Inglish" and "Up North".

== Reception ==
The album received a positive review from Canadian music magazine Exclaim!, giving it a score of 8/10 and calling it "consistently bold and thought provoking."
