= The Mix Tape, Volume 1: 60 Minutes of Funk =

Mixtape by Funkmaster Flex
- Released: November 21, 1995
- Recorded: 1995
- Studio: D&D (New York, NY)
- Genre: East Coast hip hop
- Length: 1:08:15
- Label: Loud; RCA
- Producer: Jessica Rosenblum (exec.); Funkmaster Flex (also exec.)

Funkmaster Flex chronology
The Mix Tape, Volume 1: 60 Minutes of Funk (1995)	The Mix Tape, Volume II (60 Minutes of Funk) (1997)

The Mix Tape, Volume 1: 60 Minutes of Funk is a mixtape by American DJ Funkmaster Flex, composed of freestyles and previously released songs, all mixed with Funk Flex's production. It was released on November 21, 1995, via Loud/RCA Records. The recording sessions took place at D&D Studios in New York.

The album peaked at No. 108 on the Billboard 200 and No. 15 on the Top R&B/Hip-Hop Albums chart. It was followed up by three successful sequels, all of which were certified gold by the Recording Industry Association of America.

== Critical reception ==
Professional ratings
Review scores
Source	Rating
AllMusic	4.5/5 stars
Robert Christgau	(1-star Honorable Mention)
Muzik	4/5 stars

The Village Voice wrote that "the freestyles peek up in between hot new and old school hiphop as, under Comrade Flex's deft hands, one hot beat after another bobs and weaves its way up to the surface, only to be overtaken moments later by another."

== Track listing ==
No.	Title	Writer(s)	Length
1.	"Everyday & Everynight" (performed by Yvette Michele)	M. Bryant	3:31
2.	"Get Up" (performed by Masters at Work)	K. Gonzalez	1:07
3.	"Freestyle" (performed by Keith Murray & Redman)		2:45
4.	"Zulu War Chant" (performed by Time Zone)		1:34
5.	"Loud Hangover" (performed by Akinyele and Sadat X)	D. Murphy; A. Adams	4:12
6.	"20 Minute Workout" (performed by DJ Kool)	J. Bowman Jr.	0:22
7.	"Award Tour" (performed by A Tribe Called Quest)	J. Davis; A. Mohammed; M. Taylor	1:30
8.	"Freestyle" (performed by Erick Sermon)		2:07
9.	"Shook Ones (Part II) (Acappella) / Wu-Tang Clan Ain't Nothing ta Fuck Wit" (performed by Mobb Deep & Wu-Tang Clan)	A. Johnson; K. Muchita; R. Diggs; J. Hunter; C. Smith	1:42
10.	"Incarcerated Scarfaces" (performed by Raekwon)	C. Woods; R. Diggs	2:28
11.	"Freestyle" (performed by Fugees)		1:57
12.	"20 Minute Workout" (performed by DJ Kool)	J. Bowman Jr.	0:27
13.	"I-Ight" (performed by Doug E. Fresh)		1:15
14.	"Freestyle" (performed by Fat Joe & Big Pun)		2:07
15.	"Let's Be Specific" (performed by Cool Whip, Tragedy, Freddie Foxxx, Raekwon & Havoc)	Cool Whip; P. Chapman; J. Campbell	2:52
16.	"Hey Girlfriend Promo" (performed by Funkmaster Flex)		0:12
17.	"900 Number" (performed by The 45 King)	M. James	1:01
18.	"All for One" (performed by Brand Nubian)	L. Dechalus; D. Murphy; M. Dixon	1:46
19.	"Party Groove" (performed by Showbiz)	R. LeMay; A. Barnes	1:40
20.	"Freestyle" (performed by Busta Rhymes featuring Rampage the Last Boy Scout)		2:18
21.	"Give Up the Goods (Just Step)" (performed by Mobb Deep)	A. Johnson; K. Muchita; M. Small Jr.; J. Davis; T. Perry	3:32
22.	"Puff Daddy Promo" (performed by Puff Daddy)		0:35
23.	"Freestyle" (performed by Rasta T)		1:09
24.	"Freestyle" (performed by Q-Tip)		1:36
25.	"20 Minute Workout" (performed by DJ Kool)	J. Bowman Jr.	0:15
26.	"Puerto Rico" (performed by Frankie Cutlass)		1:24
27.	"Freestyle" (performed by Method Man & Redman)		2:11
28.	"Peter Piper" (performed by Run-DMC)	D. McDaniels; J. Simmons	1:47
29.	"Eric B. Is President" (performed by Eric B. & Rakim)	E. Barrier; W. Griffin	2:37
30.	"Make the Music With Your Mouth, Biz" (performed by Biz Markie)	M. Hall; M. Williams	0:41
31.	"Nobody Beats the Biz" (performed by Biz Markie)	M. Hall; M. Williams	3:30
32.	"I Got It Made" (performed by Special Ed)	K. Archer; H. Thompson	1:37
33.	"Rock the Bells" (performed by LL Cool J)	J. Smith; R. Rubin	2:44
34.	"Droppin' Science" (performed by Marley Marl)	C. Curry; M. Williams	2:13
35.	"Freestyle" (performed by Kaotic Style)		2:31
36.	"KRS One Speech" (performed by KRS-One)		4:12
37.	"Flex Outro" (performed by Funkmaster Flex)		0:56
Total length:			1:08:15

== Charts ==
Chart (1995)	Peak position
US Billboard 200	108
US Top R&B/Hip-Hop Albums (Billboard)	15
