= Incarcerated Scarfaces =

1995 single by Raekwon

Single by Raekwon

from the album Only Built 4 Cuban Linx...
- A-side: "Ice Cream"
- Released: 1995
- Recorded: 1994
- Genre: East Coast hip-hop; mafioso rap
- Length: 4:42
- Label: Loud
- Songwriters: Corey Woods; Robert Diggs; Abrim Tilmon
- Producer: RZA

Raekwon singles chronology
"Criminology" / "Glaciers of Ice" (1995)	"Incarcerated Scarfaces" / "Ice Cream" (1995)	"Firewater" (1996)

Music video
- "Incarcerated Scarfaces" on YouTube

"Incarcerated Scarfaces" is a song by American rapper Raekwon from his debut studio album Only Built 4 Cuban Linx... (1995). It was released as the B-side of his single "Ice Cream". Produced by RZA, it contains samples of "You're Gettin' a Little Too Smart" by The Detroit Emeralds and "Wang Dang Doodle" by Koko Taylor.

== Background ==
RZA originally produced the beat of "Incarcerated Scarfaces" for GZA's album Liquid Swords, but Raekwon immediately started writing to it when he went to RZA's house and heard him playing it in the basement. Raekwon wrote three verses in less than 15 minutes and easily created the hook, before RZA was able to finish the beat. In two hours, the song was composed. The song was written in support of Raekwon's friends in jail. He wanted to include that certain theme in Only Built 4 Cuban Linx... and one of his friends had just started serving a heavy sentence.

== Content ==
In the song, Raekwon details his ascent to prominence as a rapper, with lyrics rich in slang. He includes a shout-out to Connecticut and mentions a brand of champagne tasting like vomit. He addresses discrimination against African Americans, such as being unable to catch a cab, and the troublesome aspects of his life including broken elevators and Manhattan police flooding Staten Island streets.

== Critical reception ==
Mr. S of RapReviews gave a positive review, considering it to have one of the RZA's best beats on Only Built 4 Cuban Linx... and writing "Raekwon destroys this track, ripping it as hard as he does on the entire album from the first verse: 'Thug related style attract millions / Fans, they understand my plan / Who's the kid up in the green Land? / Me and the RZA connect, blow a fuse / You lose, half ass crews get demolished and bruised.'"

== Music video ==
The music video finds Raekwon rapping on rooftops alongside his fellow Wu-Tang Clan members and smoking blunts in elevators.

== Charts ==
Chart (1995)	Peak position
US Billboard Hot 100	37
US Hot R&B/Hip-Hop Songs (Billboard)	37
US Hot Rap Songs (Billboard)	5
US Cash Box Top 100	70
