= Heaven & Hell (Raekwon song) =

Single by Raekwon featuring Ghostface Killah

from the album "Fresh" Music Inspired by the Film and Only Built 4 Cuban Linx...
- Released: October 24, 1994
- Recorded: 1994
- Genre: Hip hop
- Length: 4:56
- Label: Loud; RCA
- Songwriters: Corey Woods; Robert Diggs
- Producer: RZA

Raekwon singles chronology
"Heaven & Hell" (1994)	"Criminology" (1995)

Ghostface Killah singles chronology
"Heaven & Hell" (1994)	"Criminology" (1995)

Music video
- "Heaven & Hell" on YouTube

"Heaven & Hell" is the solo debut single by Wu-Tang Clan rapper Raekwon from the soundtrack to the 1994 film Fresh and later featured on his 1995 solo debut album Only Built 4 Cuban Linx.... It features fellow Wu-Tang Clan member Ghostface Killah and backing vocals from Wu-Tang affiliate singer Blue Raspberry. It was the first song recorded for the album. Allmusic stated "everything culminates in "Heaven & Hell" and its longing for redemption."

As the rest of the album, the song was produced by the Wu-Tang Clan leader RZA and contains a sample from "Could I Be Falling in Love?" by Syl Johnson, reached #34 in the Hot Dance Music/Maxi-Singles Sales in 1994, and #21 in the Hot Rap Singles in 1995. In 2006, German singer Joy Denalane recorded a completely reworked version of the song, under the title "Heaven or Hell", featuring Raekwon, for her album Born & Raised. Cappadonna also makes his appearance in the music video.

== Critical reception ==
Mr. S of RapReviews gave a positive review, writing: "The slow paced, somber 'Heaven & Hell' is a reminiscing song about losing a friend. The verses are excellent and the song is a great way to end an album."

== Track listing ==
1. "Heaven & Hell" (Radio Edit) - 3:14
2. "Heaven & Hell" (Album Version) - 4:59
3. "Heaven & Hell" (Instrumental) - 4:59

== Charts ==
Chart (1995)	Peak position
US Hot Rap Songs (Billboard)	21
