= Blue Raspberry (singer) =

American singer

- Born: June 9, 1972 (age 54); Pleasantville, New Jersey, United States
- Genres: Hip hop, soul
- Occupation: Singer
- Instrument: Vocals
- Years active: 1993–present
- Label: ChamberMusik

Candi Lindsey (born June 9, 1972), better known by her stage name Blue Raspberry, is an American singer from Pleasantville, New Jersey. She is perhaps best known for her affiliation with East Coast hip hop group Wu-Tang Clan. Her moniker was given to her by fellow Wu-Tang affiliate Killah Priest, who said she reminded him of a blue raspberry.

== Biography ==
She was discovered by the Wu-Tang Clan at Bally's Atlantic City, where she was working as a parking cashier at a convention and was overheard while singing over the loudspeakers. Blue Raspberry emerged as the group's in-house female vocalist during the first round of Wu-Tang solo projects. She added vocals to tracks on Method Man's Tical and Raekwon's Only Built 4 Cuban Linx..., but seemed to have her position somewhat usurped by Tekitha on the Clan's second album Wu-Tang Forever. Nevertheless, she has continued to appear on Wu projects including Method Man & Redman's Blackout! and the Ghost Dog soundtrack. A solo album was in the works for 1999 and is known to have been completed but it was not released. Blue Raspberry finally debuted as a solo artist in 2005, releasing the album Out of the Blue through the website Chambermusik.com. She made an appearance on Raekwon's Only Built 4 Cuban Linx... Pt. II album.

== Discography ==
=== Albums ===
Out of the Blue (2005, Chamber Musik)

=== Appearances ===
Artists	Track title(s)	Album	Date/Label
Gravediggaz	1800-Suicide (Poisonous Mix)	Non-album single	October 19, 1994
Method Man	Release Yo' Delf; Mr. Sandman (featuring Carlton Fisk, Inspectah Deck, Streetlife and RZA) Stimulation	Tical	November 15, 1994
Ron G	Stop the Breaks (featuring Killa Sin, Raekwon, O.C., KRS-ONE, Notorious B.I.G.)	Unreleased	1995
Raekwon	Rainy Dayz (featuring Ghostface Killah) Glaciers of Ice" (featuring Masta Killa, Ghostface Killah); Heaven & Hell (featuring Ghostface Killah	Only Built 4 Cuban Linx...	August 1, 1995
—N/a	It's Time	Don't Be a Menace to South Central While Drinking Your Juice in the Hood (soundtrack)	January 9, 1996
Gravediggaz	What's Goin' On? (featuring 9th Prince)	The Pick, the Sickle and the Shovel	October 14, 1997
Cappadonna	Young Hearts	The Pillage	March 25, 1998
Various Artists	Strange Eyes (Performed by Sunz of Man, 12 O'Clock) 4 Sho Sho (Performed by Northstar, RZA)	Ghost Dog: The Way of the Samurai	April 11, 1999
Method Man & Redman	Cereal Killer	Blackout!	September 18, 1999
Killa Beez	Killa Beez (Performed by Wu-Tang Clan & Suga Bang Bang)	The Sting	March 12, 2002
Apathy	The Winter	Eastern Philosophy	March 17, 2006
Cilvaringz	Dart Tournament (featuring Killa Sin) Valentine's Day Massacre (featuring 9th Prince, 60 Second Assassin, Shabazz the Disciple)	I	April 9, 2007
Icon the Mic King	Poverty	Icon the Mic King feat. Chum – Mike & the Fatman LP	April 17, 2007
Raekwon	Have Mercy (featuring Beanie Sigel)	Only Built 4 Cuban Linx... Pt. II	2009
Willie The Kid & DUS	Dreaming	City Lights	March 22, 2019
Epic Beard Men	Pistol Dave (ft. Slug of Atmosphere & Blue Raspberry)	This Was Supposed to be Fun	March 29, 2019
