= Criminology (song) =

Single by Raekwon feat. Ghostface Killah

from the album Only Built 4 Cuban Linx...
- B-side: "Glaciers of Ice"
- Released: June 27, 1995
- Recorded: 1994 (Criminology); 1995 (Glaciers of Ice)
- Genre: East Coast hip hop, Mafioso rap
- Length: 3:47
- Label: Loud
- Songwriters: C. Woods; R. Diggs; D. Coles
- Producer: RZA

Raekwon singles chronology
"Heaven & Hell" (1994)	"Criminology" (1995)	"Ice Cream" (1995)

Ghostface Killah singles chronology
"Heaven & Hell" (1994)	"Criminology" (1995)	"Ice Cream" (1995)

"Criminology" is the second solo single by Wu-Tang Clan rapper Raekwon, from his debut album Only Built 4 Cuban Linx..., featuring Ghostface Killah (who appears on twelve tracks of the album). The song starts with dialogue from the film Scarface, where Alex Sosa is angry with Tony Montana and insults him during a phone call, calling him a "fucking little monkey", because he failed to blow up the activist's car, then the first verse is performed by Ghostface Killah, and the second by Raekwon, without a chorus. The B-side of the single is "Glaciers of Ice". The song peaked at #43 on the Billboard Hot 100.

Ghostface Killah wrote his verse in San Francisco, and requested that RZA make a beat for the song.

The song was sampled later by DJ Premier for Mos Def's song "Mathematics".

== Background ==
Producer RZA later illustrated "That was me trying to produce like a DJ, produce a breakbeat. Ghost actually asked me to make one of those beats. You listen to old DJ tapes. That's how I made that song, and he wanted this shit to sound like a breakbeat. He had a rhyme that he knew was going to change the game - that was the verse that got him recognized. Cypress Hill's DJ Muggs called up and was like 'Yo, he killed that shit. He ripped that shit.'"

Raekwon recalled coming into RZA's studio basement and could hear the beat for the song blasting. Raekwon really liked the beat and wanted it, and RZA gave it to him. Because Raekwon happened to come into RZA's studio at that exact moment, Raekwon got first dibs on that beat over other members of the Wu-Tang Clan. Had he not come into the studio at that moment, the beat would've gone to another Wu-Tang member. Because of a first come, first served basis, if a Wu-Tang Clan member comes into RZA's studio while RZA is making a beat, that member will, 9 times out of 10, get the beat if they like it enough.

== Track listing ==
1. "Criminology" (LP Version)
2. "Criminology" (Instrumental)
3. "Glaciers of Ice" (LP Version)
4. "Glaciers of Ice" (Instrumental)

== Samples ==
- "I Keep Asking You Questions" by Black Ivory
- "Why Marry" by The Sweet Inspirations
- Dialogue from the film Scarface

== Charts ==
Chart (1995)	Peak position
US Billboard Hot 100	43
US Hot R&B/Hip-Hop Songs (Billboard)	32
US Hot Rap Songs (Billboard)	5
US Dance Singles Sales (Billboard)	2
