= Only Built 4 Cuban Linx... =

1995 studio album by Raekwon

Studio album by Raekwon
- Released: August 1, 1995
- Recorded: 1994–1995
- Studios: RZA's basement studio, New York City
- Genres: East Coast hip-hop; mafioso rap
- Length: 69:30
- Labels: Wu-Tang; Loud; RCA
- Producer: RZA

Raekwon chronology
Only Built 4 Cuban Linx... (1995)	Immobilarity (1999)

Wu-Tang Clan solo chronology
Return to the 36 Chambers: The Dirty Version (1995)	Only Built 4 Cuban Linx... (1995)	Liquid Swords (1995)

Singles from Only Built 4 Cuban Linx…
- 1. "Heaven & Hell" Released: October 24, 1994; 2. "Criminology" Released: June 26, 1995; 3. "Ice Cream" Released: 1995

Only Built 4 Cuban Linx... (commonly referred to as the Purple Tape) is the debut studio album by American rapper and Wu-Tang Clan member Raekwon, released on August 1, 1995, by Wu-Tang Records, Loud Records, and RCA Records. The album was loosely composed to play like a narrative film with Raekwon as Lex Diamonds, fellow Wu-Tang member Ghostface Killah as Tony Starks, and production from RZA. It features appearances from most members of the Wu-Tang Clan. The album introduces affiliates Cappadonna and Blue Raspberry and has a guest appearance from rapper Nas, which marked the first collaboration with a non-Wu-Tang-affiliated artist.

Upon its release, Only Built 4 Cuban Linx... debuted at number four on the Billboard 200 chart, and number two on the Top R&B/Hip-Hop Albums chart, while selling 130,000 copies in its opening week. The album was certified Gold by the Recording Industry Association of America (RIAA) on October 2, 1995, and later Platinum on February 24, 2020. According to Nielsen Soundscan, it has sold 1.1 million copies in the United States as of 2009. Although it failed to acquire the same initial sales success as previous Wu-Tang solo albums, Cuban Linx achieved greater critical praise, with many complimenting its cinematic lyricism and production.

Only Built 4 Cuban Linx... has received acclaim from music critics and writers over the years, with many lauding it as one of the greatest hip-hop albums of all time. With its emphasis on American Mafia insinuations and organized crime, the album is widely regarded as a pioneer of the mafioso rap subgenre. It is considered to have been highly influential on hip-hop over the next decade, being heavily referenced on albums such as Jay-Z's Reasonable Doubt (1996) and the Notorious B.I.G.'s Life After Death (1997). Along with GZA's Liquid Swords, Cuban Linx is the most acclaimed solo Wu-Tang work. Rolling Stone magazine placed it at number 480 on their The 500 Greatest Albums of All Time list in 2012, and at number 219 in the 2020 reboot of the list.

== Background and development ==
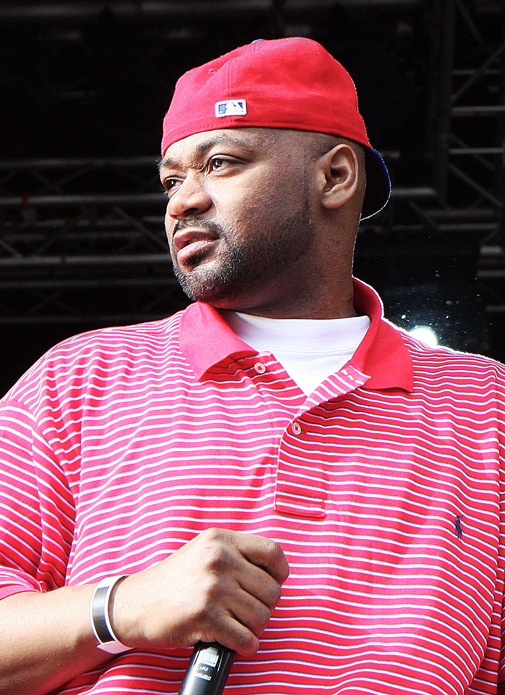
The majority of Only Built 4 Cuban Linx... features Ghostface Killah (pictured), whom Raekwon grew up with in Staten Island. The album's concept is based on their upbringing through street life and crime.

Raekwon released Only Built 4 Cuban Linx… as his debut solo album. It followed the releases of Wu-Tang Clan members' solo projects, including Method Man's Tical (1994) and Ol' Dirty Bastard's Return to the 36 Chambers: The Dirty Version (1995), following after the group’s debut album, Enter the Wu-Tang (36 Chambers) (1993). The track from the latter album, "Can It Be All So Simple", was the first recorded collaboration between Raekwon and Ghostface Killah, a partnership that would become a central feature of Only Built 4 Cuban Linx….

The album draws heavily from the personal experiences of Raekwon and Ghostface Killah growing up in Staten Island, New York, depicting street life, hustling, and other realities of their environment. In an interview with Wax Poetics, Raekwon has described the album as a reflection of his upbringing, expressing the feeling of living a life shaped by crime and the allure of a mobster lifestyle. Ghostface Killah has similarly recalled engaging in physical confrontations, club fights, and reckless behavior that led to him getting banned from local nightclubs including the Tunnel during that period, highlighting the intensity and rawness that characterized their early lives.

Raekwon and Ghostface Killah's creative partnership was defined by a strong mutual rapport, both sharing similar tastes in humor, fashion, and culture, which created a dynamic often compared to the synergy of EPMD within the Wu-Tang collective. Producer RZA emphasized that the album captured this authenticity, presenting street life in a way that felt lived-in rather than performative. He described the project as a depiction of New York’s gritty urban reality, rooted in the crack-era environment of their adolescence, and intended to confront stereotypes and channel the energy of their neighborhoods. The album features contributions from numerous Wu-Tang Clan members and affiliates, including Cappadonna and Blue Raspberry, and also includes a guest appearance from fellow rapper Nas, in which the latter described his collaboration as spontaneous, with sessions arising from casual visits from Queensbridge to Staten Island rather than planned studio work. He praised Raekwon as an artist ahead of his time and recognized the album as a project destined to achieve classic status.

The album’s title was intended to signal its musical intensity, warning listeners of the raw and unfiltered content within. Its original proposed title was Only Built 4 Cuban Linx Niggaz, but was later changed to the more commercially acceptable title Only Built 4 Cuban Linx.... The concept of the title was inspired by Cuban link chains, known for their strength and durability. Raekwon framed the title as a metaphor for resilience and toughness, reflecting the strength and authenticity of the people represented on the album. The project is also widely known as "The Purple Tape", a nickname derived from the entirely purple plastic of the original cassette. Raekwon chose this design as a reference to the way drug dealers marked their products, creating a distinctive visual identity that set it apart from others. The color and branding of the tape were intended to convey recognition and authenticity, similar to how a dealer would mark high-quality goods on the streets. The original 10,000 copies on the cassette version of Only Built 4 Cuban Linx... were colored purple, but changed to standard clear plastic by RCA, later making it a collector's item.

== Recording and production ==
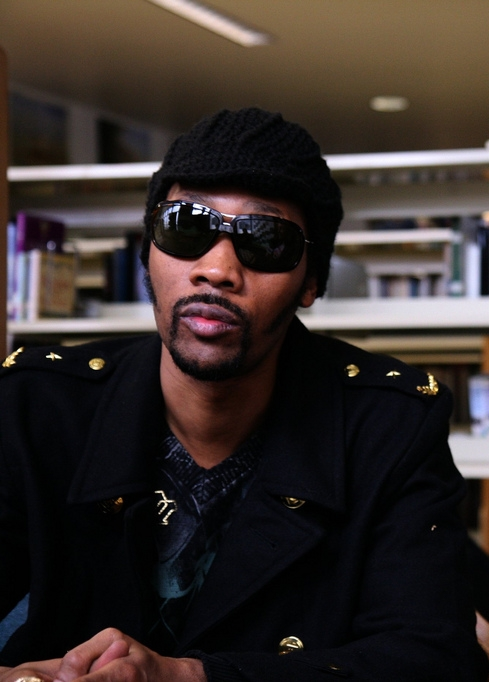
Wu-Tang Clan member RZA produced the entire album in his basement studio, as he did with solo releases by other members.

Wu-Tang Clan member RZA handled the production of Only Built 4 Cuban Linx… entirely in his basement studio in Staten Island, the same space where many of the group’s earlier albums were created. Recording began in late 1994 and continued through mid-1995, with RZA managing all aspects of engineering himself, without assistants or outside interference. Raekwon and Ghostface Killah had initially considered recording in Barbados, but they abandoned the plan due to hostile racial conditions and returned to RZA’s basement to complete the project. The studio environment allowed for flexible, spontaneous creation, with artists arriving on their own schedules to work with the beats and instrumentation RZA provided.

RZA approached the production with the goal of matching Raekwon’s combination of Five Percenter ideology and inner-city experience. He crafted a layered, polished sound that was slower and more cinematic than earlier Wu-Tang efforts, incorporating strings, piano loops, and vocal samples from Kung Fu and Mafia films. This approach reinforced Raekwon’s cinematic, mobster-style narrative, with tracks structured like scenes from a crime movie. RZA cited soul musician Isaac Hayes as an influence on the album’s orchestral elements, and several of the beats, including one for "Incarcerated Scarfaces", were originally intended for GZA’s Liquid Swords (1995) before being reassigned to Raekwon due to his timely creative input. Raekwon clarified that the process was collaborative yet fluid, with him selecting beats that suited his album while avoiding conflicts over production. Throughout the project, RZA sampled dialogue from John Woo's film The Killer (1989). The director later expressed appreciation for the use of his material, beginning his friendship with RZA. Woo mentored RZA on cinematic techniques and shared meals with Raekwon and Ghostface Killah. This connection further reinforced the album’s cinematic sensibility and commitment to a narrative-driven, filmic approach to hip-hop production.

The song "Wu-Gambinos" was among the first recorded for Only Built 4 Cuban Linx… and introduced the Gambino aliases used for members appearing on the album. These aliases would go on to become highly influential in hip-hop. Raekwon drew inspiration from the film Once Upon a Time in America (1984), which stars Robert De Niro and James Woods. He admired how the characters started from nothing and grew their influence over time. Names like "Tony Starks" came from Iron Man, while "Lex Diamonds" was inspired by Louis Roederer, who made Cristal, reflecting Raekwon's fascination with the diamond world. At the time, he often wore flashy jewelry and referred to it as "ice". He began assigning similar aliases to members of his crew. On his album, Raekwon wanted each member to have a distinct identity on a Gambino track. For example, he named Masta Killa "Noodles" and GZA "Maximillian", paralleling the characters in Once Upon a Time in America, with Maximillian representing the intellectual leader. Inspectah Deck was called "Rollie Fingers" because of the way he rolled blunts. Over time, these names naturally aligned with each crew member's personality and role.

== Music and themes ==
"Verbal Intercourse"
The much-revered collaboration between Raekwon and Nas portrays prophetic and criminal imagery.

Only Built 4 Cuban Linx… is known for introducing a distinctive slang unique to Raekwon and Ghostface. The album heavily incorporates the Supreme Alphabet and Supreme Mathematics, techniques often used by the Wu-Tang Clan, while blending terms drawn from the streets of New York. Several songs follow detailed, loosely connected narratives. Robert Christgau described the album as a dense and richly layered work, transforming the harsh realities of the crack era into a carefully constructed vision of aspiration. He noted that the album creates its own internal logic, moral framework, and aesthetic beauty, presenting an illusion that reflects both danger and possibility. While this illusion does not erase the hardships experienced by those caught in the crossfire, Wu-Tang’s artistry offers a symbolic and literal pathway out of that environment, particularly for the members themselves, though its influence extends beyond them.

According to RZA, the album’s theme follows two men who are tired of the negative life but are planning one last big score, with Raekwon portraying Lex Diamonds and Ghostface Killah portraying Tony Starks. They aim to make a final quarter million before retiring, hoping to secure a better future and see their grandchildren. The album opens with "Striving for Perfection", where Raekwon and Ghostface Killah converse about their visions and goals. On the following track, "Knuckleheadz", they divide money in the intro and then carry out a heist. U-God’s character is killed off at the end of his verse because he was serving several months in prison, which prevented him from participating further on the album. U-God later brought in his childhood friend and lyric mentor Cappadonna to take his place on later tracks.

Only Built 4 Cuban Linx… features dialogue-driven interludes at the start of several tracks, where Raekwon and Ghostface Killah discuss money, life, crime, and hip-hop. For example, the introduction to "Glaciers of Ice" features Ghostface Killah explaining his plans and methods for dyeing Wallabee-style Clarks. He developed the dyeing technique himself and considered it a unique part of his style, seeing himself as an innovator in fashion alongside figures like Slick Rick. The album concludes with "North Star", which serves as a closing credits-style track. RZA described the song as marking the completion of Raekwon’s mission, with everything wrapped up. Popa Wu was brought in as a mentor on the track to provide guidance and knowledge, helping keep the artists aligned with the principles of self-awareness and wisdom. Raekwon added that "North Star" was a track he strongly wanted on the album, as it had a cinematic, motion picture-like quality that fit the album’s narrative closure.

== Singles ==
"Criminology"
The RZA-produced track has an uptempo beat and features a verse by Ghostface Killah, the album's "co-star".

Though several songs, such as "Glaciers of Ice" and "Incarcerated Scarfaces", received radio play, only three official singles were released for Only Built 4 Cuban Linx.... The first of which was "Heaven & Hell", released October 24, 1994. Aside from being the album's first single, it was also the first song recorded for the album, serving as an installment to the soundtrack for the movie Fresh. The song features the second recorded appearance of Wu-Tang affiliate Blue Raspberry, who provides backing vocals. By early 1995, "Heaven & Hell" reached number 21 on the Hot Rap Singles chart, and number 34 on the Hot Dance Music/Maxi-Singles Sales chart.

"Criminology", with "Glaciers of Ice" as the B-side, was released on June 26, 1995, and achieved notable chart success. It peaked at number 43 on the Billboard Hot 100, number 34 on the Hot R&B/Hip-Hop Songs chart, number five on the Hot Rap Singles chart, and number two on the Hot Dance Music/Maxi-Singles Sales chart. RZA produced the track by emulating a DJ-style breakbeat, drawing inspiration from old DJ tapes. Ghostface Killah specifically requested a breakbeat sound for the song, and his verse on the track became widely recognized, even drawing praise from Cypress Hill’s DJ Muggs, who commended the performance.

"Ice Cream", released as the album's third and final single later that year, with "Incarcerated Scarfaces" as the B-side, became the most commercially successful single from the album. It reached number 37 on both the Billboard Hot 100 and Hot R&B/Hip-Hop Songs charts, and number five on both the Hot Rap Singles and Hot Dance Music/Maxi-Singles Sales charts. The song uses different ice cream flavors as a metaphor for various racial groups of women, reflecting Raekwon and Ghostface’s intention to show respect for women as queens in all their diversity. The track also marks Cappadonna’s second appearance on the album and his commercial breakthrough, in which he joined the track after joking about getting on it as RZA encouraged him to record his verse.

== Commercial performance ==
Released on August 1, 1995, by Loud Records and RCA Records, Only Built 4 Cuban Linx... debuted at number four on the Billboard 200 chart, and number two on the Top R&B/Hip-Hop Albums chart, while selling 130,000 copies in its opening week. The album was certified gold by the Recording Industry Association of America (RIAA) on October 2, 1995, and later platinum on February 24, 2020. According to Nielsen Soundscan, it has sold 1.1 million copies in the United States alone as of 2009. In the United Kingdom, the album peaked at number 85 on the UK Albums chart.

== Critical reception ==
Contemporary professional reviews
Review scores
Source	Rating
Entertainment Weekly	A−
Los Angeles Times	4/4 stars
Muzik	5/5 stars
NME	8/10
The Source	4.5/5 stars
Spin	8/10

=== Initial reception ===
Only Built 4 Cuban Linx… was widely praised by contemporary critics. Nicholas Poluhoff of The Source noted that Raekwon brought a unique style to the Wu-Tang cipher, delivering lyrics like rapid-fire storytelling, and highlighted the album’s abundance of complex, well-written lyrics. Poluhoff also praised RZA's production, describing it as his best work at the time and particularly well-suited to Raekwon’s distinct flow, which weaves in and out of the beats. Cheo H. Coker of Spin compared Raekwon's vivid lyricism to that of Kool G Rap, saying it creates intense, immersive imagery, and credited RZA with elevating production to new heights. The Los Angeles Times remarked that tracks featuring other Wu-Tang members matched the quality of anything on Enter the 36 Chambers, noting that RZA’s production ranges from minimal to symphonic and pulls the listener in despite chaotic elements. The review also emphasized that, unlike typical singles-focused hip-hop albums, Only Built 4 Cuban Linx... works as a cohesive, full-length project with a compelling overarching vision. Vibe’s Dream Hampton praised Raekwon and Ghostface Killah for their clever use of cultural appropriation in the lyrics, noting that the duo brings out "the best in each other."

=== Retrospective reception ===
Retrospective professional reviews
Review scores
Source	Rating
AllMusic	5/5 stars
Christgau's Consumer Guide	A−
Encyclopedia of Popular Music	4/5 stars
Mojo	5/5 stars
MusicHound R&B	5/5 stars
Pitchfork	9.5/10
The Rolling Stone Album Guide	5/5 stars
Tom Hull – on the Web	A−

In retrospective review, critics consider Only Built 4 Cuban Linx... along with GZA's Liquid Swords (1995) as one of the most acclaimed solo projects from the Wu-Tang Clan. The Rolling Stone Album Guide (2004) described it as essential listening for anyone interested in the group. Steve Huey of AllMusic regarded Raekwon as arguably the group’s best storyteller, noting that he translated epic mafia-movie themes into a fully realized hip-hop album. Huey suggested that Only Built 4 Cuban Linx..., along with Liquid Swords, might be the best Wu-Tang solo album, and he emphasized that it takes several listens to fully appreciate the complexity of the lyrics, though the experience is highly rewarding. Spin ranked the album as the 83rd-best of the 1990s, calling it an "epic, cinema-scale crime drama" that was far ahead of hip-hop’s conceptual curve. In commencement of the album's 20th anniversary, Vibe considered it to feature some of RZA's "finest production to date", giving credit to its "perfect sequencing and cohesive selection".

Rolling Stone placed the album at number 480 in its 2012 list of the 500 Greatest Albums of All Time, praising its understated cool and densely woven verses, and highlighting Raekwon’s ability to craft intricate drug-rap narratives that rival the mob movies celebrated in hip-hop. In the 2020 reboot of the list, the album’s ranking rose dramatically to number 219.

== Legacy and influence ==
=== Cultural impact ===
Only Built 4 Cuban Linx...played a major role in popularizing street-oriented, mafioso rap in the East Coast hip-hop scene. While this style had been pioneered by Kool G Rap in the late 1980s, it did not fully permeate hip-hop until the release of Only Built 4 Cuban Linx...in 1995. The albumnfrequently references the "Wu-Gambinos", a set of alter-egos adopted by the rappers involved, which helped inspire hip-hop artists to explore new personas. This trend influenced figures such as Nas, who adopted the Escobar moniker, and The Notorious B.I.G., who developed his Frank White persona further after the album’s release. Tupac Shakur later assumed the name Makaveli and gave his Outlawz crew new identities with a militaristic, dictatorial theme. Method Man noted that Raekwon pioneered the concept of the Gambinos, drawing on his fascination with gangster movies and mob literature to craft authentic, character-driven alter-egos. Ghostface Killah added that the Gambino concept was taken to its highest level on the album, creating a tight-knit familial bond among the crew and opening the door for other artists to experiment with similar personas.

The album had a profound influence on hip-hop, inspiring numerous albums that adopted its stylistic and thematic principles. In 1996, fellow rapper Jay-Z released his debut album Reasonable Doubt, which portrayed a lavish, Cristal-drinking mobster persona and explored themes of street crime and transitioning from drug dealing to rap, echoing topics covered on Only Built 4 Cuban Linx.... Raekwon later considered Jay-Z to be a student of their work and accomplishments during that era. That same year, Nas released It Was Written, updating his image to incorporate mafioso posturing inspired by Raekwon and adopting the "Nas Escobar" moniker, which had originated from his guest appearance on Only Built 4 Cuban Linx....

Ghostface Killah also released his debut album, Ironman (1996), which explored some of the same themes introduced on Only Built 4 Cuban Linx.... In 1997, the Notorious B.I.G. incorporated mafioso rap elements into his second and final studio album, Life After Death, while Nas and the Firm followed with The Firm: The Album (1997), continuing the trend. Despite the album’s widespread impact, Raekwon later emphasized that he did not intend to shape hip-hop culture; his goal was simply to create a work that was worth purchasing and worthy of respect. Only Built 4 Cuban Linx... continued to influence hip-hop artists further with its style of "coke rap", including Clipse, Lil Wayne, Dipset, Rick Ross, and French Montana.

Another example of the album's influence is the surge in popularity of Cristal champagne, which Raekwon and Ghostface Killah prominently referenced on the album. The brand has since become a staple in hip-hop, with continued mentions in songs and culture. Raekwon explained that they were among the first to promote Cristal, often seeking the best wine available during meetings with Loud Records executives, including president Steve Rifkind. When more familiar luxury wines were unavailable, they were offered Cristal instead. Both Raekwon and Ghostface Killah appreciated the bottle’s design and the name, which inspired Raekwon’s alias Lex Diamonds, derived from Louie Roederer. The exclusivity and cost of Cristal resonated with them, cementing it as their preferred choice and a symbol of status within hip-hop.

=== Retrospective acclaim from musicians ===
In 2011, The Roots drummer and bandleader Questlove ranked Only Built 4 Cuban Linx... at number four on his top five hip-hop concept albums list. On August 1, 2018, the 23rd anniversary of the album, Pusha T visited Stapleton Houses in Staten Island to speak about the album's influence on an interview. He considered his album Daytona (2018) to be his "Purple Tape" and emphasized its creative language. Pusha T revealed that during the production of his album, he played various songs from Only Built 4 Cuban Linx... for Kanye West for inspiration.

Pusha T doubled down on the album's influence later, in which he considered it to be "one of the best albums I've ever heard in my life" and placed it on his personal top five albums list in 2022. During an interview with Malice as Clipse in 2025, they revealed that they would rhyme with "the Purple Tape in the bullseye" while recording Let God Sort Em Out (2025). In 2022, Takeoff and Quavo released the collaborative albums Only Built for Infinity Links, in which the title was inspired by Only Built 4 Cuban Linx.... They received direct approval from Raekwon to use the inspired title.

=== Reissues ===
In 2012, Get on Down released a reissue of Only Built 4 Cuban Linx... as part of their Masters Series, with the whole set including a purple cassette tape, 32-page liner notes book, glass top, "fancy" display case, poster, sticker. It was limited to a thousand copies and sold out within 36 hours. The following year, the same company issued the album on cassette but was enclosed in a premium shell described as a "meticulously recreated 'J-Card' cassette inlay". In August 2019, Get on Down released a vinyl reissue of the album, which included the bonus track "North Star (Jewel)" on a vinyl pressing for the first time. In commencement of the album's 25th anniversary, in August 2020, Certified Classics issued an instrumental version Only Built 4 Cuban Linx... with partnership from Get on Down. The vinyl was pressed on "translucent double splatter purple vinyl and placed in a silver die-cut jacket."

=== Sequel ===
After two solo projects that were both critically and commercially unsuccessful, Raekwon announced a sequel to Only Built 4 Cuban Linx... in late 2005. The sequel was highly anticipated for nearly four years since its original announcement and fourteen years after the release of the original, appearing in XXL's top 10 list of most anticipated albums in 2007. Only Built 4 Cuban Linx... Pt. II was released in 2009 to critical acclaim.

=== Upcoming documentary ===
In January 2015, it was announced that a documentary titled The Purple Tape Files, based on Only Built 4 Cuban Linx..., was in the works to commemorate its 20th anniversary. The documentary was funded by fans on FanBacked.com. Explaining why it was fan-funded, he and Ghostface Killah told Complex that they wanted to make the approach organic, keeping creative control over the project. Donors received various incentives based on their amount given, including a 20th anniversary sticker for $5, personal mixtape review from Raekwon and Ghostface Killah for $200, and a crowdfunding producer credit for $10,000 that includes merchandise and an invite to the film's premiere.

According to Raekwon, The Purple Tape Files provides a "candid look" on the album's development and subsequent influence on music. In March, Raekwon spoke about wanting to make The Purple Tape Files "honest as possible", removing filter from themselves and other participants. He also planned to promote the project at Coachella and the Toronto Film Festival, adding that it would finish in August by his production company Third Eye Vision. However, the project has been presumed to be scrapped with no updates for a decade

On June 10, 2025, coinciding with the 30th anniversary of Only Built 4 Cuban Linx..., Raekwon and Ghostface Killah released a trailer for The Purple Tape Files, a documentary examining the creation and legacy of the album. Raekwon explained that he approached the project with a serious mindset, aiming to create a storytelling album that would stand out. He noted that the color purple symbolized royalty, reflecting the ambitious vision behind the work. He emphasized that the crew faced a choice between remaining in street life or pursuing the American dream through their music. The documentary also features insights from notable figures in hip-hop, including Nas, Kendrick Lamar, Snoop Dogg, Busta Rhymes, The Alchemist, DJ Premier, Charlamagne Tha God, 9th Wonder, Fat Joe, N.O.R.E., and Peter Rosenberg.

=== Retrospective concerts ===
In commencement of the 20th anniversary of Only Built 4 Cuban Linx... in 2015, Raekwon and Ghostface Killah embarked on a summer tour, which began on July 7 in Philadelphia, and concluded on August 18 in Los Angeles. In 2021, the two along with GZA went on the 3 Chambers Tour as a celebration of Only Built 4 Cuban Linx..., Liquid Swords, and Ironman. It began on October 1 in Minneapolis, and concluded on December 18 in Indianapolis.

On February 16 and 17, 2024, with collaboration from the Colorado Symphony, Raekwon and RZA performed an orchestral interpretation of the album at Boettcher Concert Hall in Denver. In 2025, in commencement of its 30th anniversary, Raekwon partnered with Mobb Deep to embark on a tour celebrating the album along with the latter's album The Infamous (1995). The tour began on November 13 in Portland, and concluded on December 15 in Miami Beach.

=== Sneaker collaborations ===
In August 2015, Raekwon collaborated with Packer Shoes and Diadora to release purple-colored sneakers, serving as a reference to the album's purple cassette tape. Additional references are features on the sneakers, including a "1995" embroidery toward the heel and a Parental Advisory tag on the footbed. The numbers on the back side reflect the two sides of the tape. The sneakers were manufactured in Italy and released on August 20 exclusively at S.O.B.'s in New York City. The first 95 customers who purchased the "Purple Tape" N.9000 received free tickets to a Raekwon concert. In 2022, Raekwon, Foot Locker, and Diadora collaborated to release a "Community Linx" pair with two N.9002 colorways, with a pair primarily consisting of orange and blue colors, and another being in grayscale.

== Track listing ==
All tracks produced by RZA, and written by Corey Woods and Robert Diggs; except where noted.

No.	Title	Writer(s)	Length
1.	"Striving for Perfection"		1:43
2.	"Knuckleheadz" (featuring Ghostface Killah and U-God)		4:03
3.	"Knowledge God"		4:24
4.	"Criminology" (featuring Ghostface Killah)	Woods; Dennis Coles; Diggs; Leroy Jackson; Patrick Adams; Russell Patterson; Stuart Bascombe	3:47
5.	"Incarcerated Scarfaces"	Woods; Diggs; Abrim Tilmon	4:42
6.	"Rainy Dayz" (featuring Ghostface Killah and Blue Raspberry)		6:02
7.	"Guillotine (Swordz)" (featuring Ghostface Killah, Inspectah Deck and GZA)		4:22
8.	"Can It Be All So Simple (Remix)" (featuring Ghostface Killah)	Wu-Tang Clan; Alan Bergman; Marilyn Bergman; Marvin Hamlisch	5:38
9.	"Shark Niggas (Biters)"		1:38
10.	"Ice Water" (featuring Ghostface Killah and Cappadonna)		3:38
11.	"Glaciers of Ice" (featuring Ghostface Killah and Masta Killa)	Woods; Diggs; Coles; Elgin Turner	5:20
12.	"Verbal Intercourse" (featuring Ghostface Killah and Nas)	Woods; Diggs; David Porter; Ronald Williams	3:31
13.	"Wisdom Body" (featuring Ghostface Killah)		2:38
14.	"Spot Rusherz"		3:13
15.	"Ice Cream" (featuring Ghostface Killah, Method Man and Cappadonna)		4:13
16.	"Wu-Gambinos" (featuring Ghostface Killah, Method Man, RZA and Masta Killa)		5:39
17.	"Heaven & Hell" (featuring Ghostface Killah)		4:56
Total length:			69:30

Bonus track
No.	Title	Writer(s)	Length
18.	"North Star (Jewels)"	Woods; Diggs; Barry White	3:58
Total length:			73:35

Notes

- "Striving For Perfection" and "Shark Niggas (Biters)" contain additional vocals from Ghostface Killah.
- "Glaciers of Ice" contains additional vocals from Blue Raspberry and 60 Second Assassin.
- "Heaven and Hell" contains additional vocals from Blue Raspberry.
- "North Star (Jewels) contains additional vocals from Popa Wu and Ol' Dirty Bastard.

Sample credits

- "Criminology" contains samples from "I Keep Asking You Questions" by Black Ivory.
- "Can It Be All So Simple (Remix)" contains a sample from "The Way We Were" by Gladys Knight & the Pips.
- "Verbal Intercourse" contains a sample from "If You Think It (You May As Well Do It)" by The Emotions.
- "Heaven & Hell" contains a sample from "Could I Be Falling in Love" by Syl Johnson.
- "North Star (Jewels)" contains a sample from "Mellow Mood Part One" by Barry White.

== Personnel ==
Credits were adapted from Tidal and the album's liner notes.

- Raekwon as Lex Diamond – performer
- Ghostface Killah as Tony Starks – performer, executive producer
- RZA as Bobby Steels – performer, arranger, producer, engineer, mixing, executive producer
- Cappadonna as Cappachino – performer
- Masta Killa as Noodles – performer
- Method Man as Johnny Blaze – performer
- U-God as Golden Arms – performer
- GZA as Maximillion – performer
- Inspectah Deck as Rollie Fingers – performer
- Nas as Nas Escobar – performer
- Blue Raspberry – vocals
- Ol' Dirty Bastard – vocals
- Popa Wu – vocals
- 60 Second Assassin – vocals
- 4th Disciple – mixing
- Islord – arranger, assistant engineer
- Mitchell Diggs – executive producer
- Oli Grant – executive producer
- Tom Coyne – mastering
- Schott Free – A&R
- Matt Life – A&R
- Daniel Hastings – photography
- Miguel Rivera – design
- Christian Cortes – design

== Charts ==
=== Weekly charts ===
Chart (1995)	Peak position
UK Albums (Official Charts)	85
US Billboard 200	4
US Top R&B/Hip-Hop Albums (Billboard)	2

=== Year-end charts ===
Chart (1995)	Position
US Billboard 200	129
US Top R&B/Hip-Hop Albums (Billboard)	23

== Certifications ==
Region	Certification	Certified units/sales
United Kingdom (BPI)	Silver	60,000^{*}
United States (RIAA)	Platinum	1,100,000
^{*} Sales figures based on certification alone.

== Accolades ==
Location	Country	Accolade	Year	Rank
Exclaim	Canada	100 Records that Rocked 100 Issues	2000	*
NME	United Kingdom	Top 50 Albums Of The Year 1995	1995	29
Pitchfork	United States	Top 100 Favorite Records of the 1990s	2003	99
Rhapsody	United States	The A's, B's and Kilos of Coke Rap	2010	*
Robert Dimery	United States	1001 Albums You Must Hear Before You Die	2005	*
Rolling Stone	United States	The Essential Recordings of the 90s	1999	*
Rolling Stone	United States	100 Best Albums of the Nineties	2011	62
Rolling Stone	United States	The 500 Greatest Albums of All Time	2012	480
Rolling Stone	United States	The 500 Greatest Albums of All Time	2020	219
The Source	United States	100 Best Rap Albums	1998	*
The Source	United States	The Critics Top 100 Black Music Albums of All Time	2006	20
Spin	United States	Top 90 Albums of the 90s	1999	83
Stylus	United States	Top 101–200 Albums of All Time Top 101-200	2004	123
Village Voice	United States	Pazz & Jop Critics' Poll	1996	15
The Wire	United Kingdom	Best Records of 1995	1996	7

== See also ==
- Album era
