= Ice Cream (Raekwon song) =

Single by Raekwon featuring Ghostface Killah, Method Man and Cappadonna

from the album Only Built 4 Cuban Linx...
- B-side: "Incarcerated Scarfaces"
- Released: September 25, 1995
- Recorded: 1995
- Genre: East Coast hip-hop; dirty rap; hardcore rap
- Length: 4:12
- Label: Loud
- Songwriters: Corey Woods; Robert Diggs
- Producer: RZA

Raekwon singles chronology
"Criminology" (1995)	"Ice Cream" (1995)	"Rainy Dayz" (1996)

Ghostface Killah singles chronology
"Criminology" (1995)	"Ice Cream" (1995)	"4th Chamber" (1996)

Method Man singles chronology
"How High" (1995)	"Ice Cream" (1995)	"The Riddler" (1995)

Cappadonna singles chronology
"Ice Cream" (1995)	"Taking Drastic Measures" (1996)

Music video
- "Ice Cream" on YouTube

"Ice Cream" is the third solo single by Wu-Tang Clan member Raekwon, from his debut studio album Only Built 4 Cuban Linx... (1995). The song features Wu-Tang Clan members Method Man in the intro, chorus and outro, Ghostface Killah in the first verse, and Cappadonna in the third. The song peaked at #37 on the Billboard Hot 100.

The single's B-side is "Incarcerated Scarfaces". Both songs are included on the compilation album The RZA Hits (1999).

Lauryn Hill sampled "Ice Cream" on her song "I Used to Love Him", from her 1998 album, The Miseducation of Lauryn Hill. The Game remixed "Ice Cream" with his "Can't Understand" freestyle in 2004.

== Background ==
The song uses different flavor variants of ice cream as a metaphor for different races of women. Raekwon later commented "we wanted to reach out and let the women know that we respected them as queens. And queens, much like ice cream, come in all different flavors." He also said: "The writing and recording process of 'Ice Cream' was fun! The song's focus was to highlight and represent beautiful women of all colors by describing them as flavors of ice cream. The sound from the ice cream truck was a perfect way to put us in the pocket, and the hook really made it easy to attack the song."

When producing the beat for the song, Raekwon stated: "RZA produced the record. We needed something soft but heartfelt for the album. I wanted to make sure women were incorporated in this concept, they played such a huge part in hip-hop culture... I had to make it happen!"

== Samples ==
- "Ice Cream Man" by Eddie Murphy (the repeated phrase "The Ice Cream Man is coming!!")
- "Ice Cream Man (rare demo)" by Method Man
- "A Time For Love" by Earl Klugh
- "The Breakdown (Part II)" by Rufus Thomas

== Music video ==
The music video was filmed near the Jamaica Colosseum Mall in Jamaica, Queens and it features a cameo by Sam Sneed, Shyheim, Tyson Beckford, Soul For Real, and Irv Gotti. The director of the music video, Ralph McDaniels, said: "The most challenging thing about shooting 'Ice Cream' was controlling the crowd once the public found out the group was in Jamaica, Queens. My favorite moment is Ghostface in the Jamaica Colosseum Mall rapping to a home girl. That was a classic, because we cast her on location." McDaniels also said: "I wanted women to love the video. 'The Ice Cream man is coming' was the first thing that caught my ear. We had to have a kid yelling that part, and the reference to the flavors. Butter Pecan Rican, Chocolate Deluxe, French Vanilla and Caramel Sundae. We had to have women that represented that complexion. The T-Shirts on the women in the video are collector's items."

Raekwon stated: "We really didn't get super fresh because of the fast timing of shooting. We didn't have any stylist at the time; that's what made it so authentic. There were a few celebs there, and they were just chilling with us, having fun."

The music video for "Ice Cream" was one of two Raekwon music videos that were shot in that same weekend. The other music video was for the song "Incarcerated Scarfaces".

== Track listing ==
=== Side 1 ===
1. "Ice Cream" (LP version)
2. "Ice Cream" (Instrumental)

=== Side A ===
1. "Incarcerated Scarfaces" (LP version)
2. "Incarcerated Scarfaces" (Instrumental)

== Charts ==
Chart (1995)	Peak position
US Billboard Hot 100	37
US Hot R&B/Hip-Hop Songs (Billboard)	37
US Hot Rap Songs (Billboard)	5
US Cash Box Top 100	29

== See also ==
- 1995 in music
