= Method Man discography =

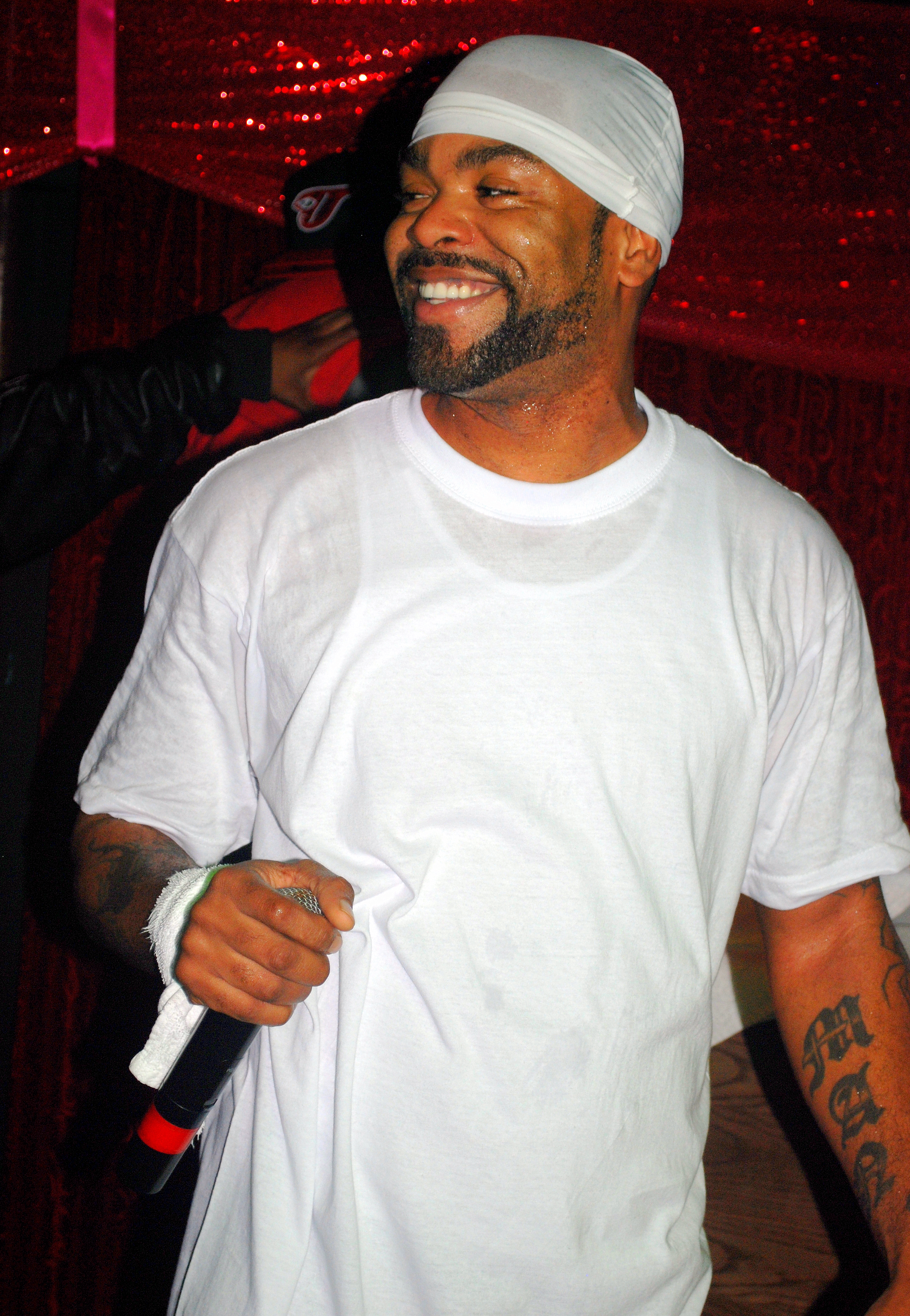
- Studio albums: 7
- Singles: 34
- Guest appearances: 116

The discography of Method Man, an American rapper, consists of seven studio albums (including one collaborative album) and 34 singles (including 16 as a featured artist). Method Man embarked on his music career in 1992, as a member of East Coast hip hop group Wu-Tang Clan. After the Wu-Tang Clan released their highly acclaimed debut album Enter the Wu-Tang (36 Chambers) (1993), Method Man would be the first member to release his solo debut album. In November 1994, he released Tical, under Def Jam Recordings. His debut album Tical, features his biggest hit single to date, "I'll Be There for You/You're All I Need to Get By", which features American R&B singer Mary J. Blige and peaked at number three on the US Billboard Hot 100. Method Man would then go on to collaborate with fellow East Coast rapper Redman, and subsequently form a duo together.

== Albums ==
=== Studio albums ===
List of studio albums, with selected chart positions, sales figures and certifications
Title	Album details	Peak chart positions										Sales	Certifications
Title	Album details	US	US R&B	AUS	AUT	CAN	FRA	GER	NLD	SWI	UK	Sales	Certifications
Tical	Released: November 15, 1994 (US); Label: Def Jam; Formats: CD, LP, cassette	4	1	—	—	50	—	—	—	—	—	US: 1,613,000	RIAA: Platinum; BPI: Gold; MC: Platinum
Tical 2000: Judgement Day	Released: November 17, 1998 (US); Label: Def Jam; Formats: CD, LP, cassette	2	1	46	—	5	15	32	40	—	49	US: 1,605,000	RIAA: Platinum; BPI: Silver; MC: Platinum
Tical 0: The Prequel	Released: May 18, 2004 (US); Label: Def Jam; Formats: LP, cassette, digital download	2	1	81	60	3	16	22	67	7	29	US: 533,000	RIAA: Gold
4:21... The Day After	Released: August 29, 2006 (US); Label: Def Jam; Formats: CD, LP, digital download	8	4	—	68	47	35	47	74	8	80	US: 229,000	
The Meth Lab	Released: August 21, 2015 (US); Label: Hanz On Music, Tommy Boy; Formats: CD, LP, cassette, digital download	57	6	—	—	20	133	38	—	12	—		
Meth Lab Season 2: The Lithium	Released: December 14, 2018 (US); Label: Hanz On Music Entertainment; Formats: CD, LP, digital download	—	—	—	—	—	—	—	—	—	—		
Meth Lab Season 3: The Rehab	Released: May 6, 2022 (US); Label: Hanz On Music Entertainment, ONErpm; Formats: CD, LP, digital download	—	—	—	—	—	—	—	—	—	—		
"—" denotes a recording that did not chart or was not released in that territory.

=== Collaboration albums ===
List of collaboration albums, with selected chart positions
Title	Album details	Peak chart positions									Sales	Certifications
Title	Album details	US	US R&B	US Rap	CAN	FRA	GER	NLD	SWI	UK	Sales	Certifications
Blackout! (with Redman)	Released: September 28, 1999 (US); Label: Def Jam; Formats: CD, LP, cassette	3	1	12	3	33	36	36	—	45	US: 1,575,000	RIAA: Platinum; BPI: Gold; MC: Platinum
How High (with Redman)	Released: December 11, 2001 (US); Label: Def Jam; Formats: CD, LP, cassette	3	1	12	3	33	36	36	—	45		RIAA: Platinum
Blackout! 2 (with Redman)	Released: May 19, 2009 (US); Label: Def Jam; Formats: CD, LP, digital download	7	2	2	10	67	66	—	6	—	US: 147,000	
Wu-Massacre (with Ghostface Killah and Raekwon)	Released: March 30, 2010 (US); Label: Def Jam; Formats: CD, LP, digital download	12	6	2	29	128	—	—	27	148	US: 100,000	
"—" denotes a recording that did not chart or was not released in that territory.

== Singles ==
=== As lead artist ===
List of singles as lead artist, with selected chart positions and certifications, showing year released and album name
Title	Year	Peak chart positions										Certifications	Album
Title	Year	US	US R&B	US Rap	BEL (WA)	FRA	GER	NZ	SWE	SWI	UK	Certifications	Album
"Bring the Pain"	1994	45	30	4	—	—	—	—	—	—	—		Tical
"Release Yo' Delf"	1995	98	107	28	—	—	—	—	—	—	46		Tical
"I'll Be There for You/You're All I Need to Get By" (featuring Mary J. Blige)	1995	3	1	1	—	90	36	22	—	—	10	RIAA: Platinum	Tical
"The Riddler"	1995	56	41	4	—	—	—	—	—	—	—		Batman Forever (soundtrack)
"Wu-Wear: The Garment Renaissance" (with RZA and Cappadonna)	1996	60	46	6	—	—	—	—	—	—	—		High School High (soundtrack)
"Hit 'Em High (The Monstars' Anthem)" (with B-Real, Coolio, LL Cool J and Busta Rhymes)	1996	—	—	—	14	38	5	17	10	11	8		Space Jam (soundtrack)
"Judgement Day"	1998	—	42	21	—	—	—	—	—	—	—		Tical 2000: Judgement Day
"Grand Finale" (with DMX, Ja Rule and Nas)	1998	117	63	18	—	—	—	—	—	—	—		Belly (soundtrack)
"Break Ups 2 Make Ups" (featuring D'Angelo)	1999	98	29	10	—	—	—	—	—	—	33		Tical 2000: Judgement Day
"Even If"	2000	—	118	20	—	—	—	—	—	—	—		Nutty Professor II: The Klumps (soundtrack)
"Party & Bullshit" (with Teddy Riley)	2001	—	119	6	—	—	24	—	—	55	99		Rush Hour 2 (soundtrack)
"What's Happenin'" (featuring Busta Rhymes)	2004	—	65	—	—	—	82	—	—	—	17		Tical 0: The Prequel
"The Show"	2004	—	—	—	—	—	—	—	—	—	—		Tical 0: The Prequel
"Say" (featuring Lauryn Hill)	2006	—	66	—	—	—	—	—	—	—	—	RMNZ: Gold	4:21... The Day After
"Our Dreams" (with Ghostface Killah and Raekwon)	2010	—	—	—	—	—	—	—	—	—	—		Wu-Massacre
"Mef vs. Chef 2" (with Ghostface Killah and Raekwon)	2010	—	—	—	—	—	—	—	—	—	—		Wu-Massacre
"Miranda" (with Ghostface Killah and Raekwon)	2010	—	—	—	—	—	—	—	—	—	—		Wu-Massacre
"Dangerous" (with Ghostface Killah and Raekwon)	2010	—	—	—	—	—	—	—	—	—	—		Wu-Massacre
"Built for This" (with Freddie Gibbs and Streetlife)	2012	—	—	—	—	—	—	—	—	—	—		The Man with the Iron Fists (soundtrack)
"Claudine" (with Ghostface Killah, Mathematics and Nicole Bus)	2023												—N/a
"—" denotes a recording that did not chart or was not released in that territory.

=== As featured artist ===
List of singles as featured artist, with selected chart positions, showing year released and album name
Title	Year	Peak chart positions										Album
Title	Year	US	US R&B	US Rap	BEL (WA)	FRA	GER	NLD	SWE	SWI	UK	Album
"Hush Hush Tip" (N-Tyce featuring Method Man [uncredited])	1993											12"
"No Hook" (Shaquille O'Neal featuring RZA and Method Man)	1994	103	66	16	—	—	—	—	—	—	—	Shaq Fu: Da Return
"Vibin' (The New Flava)" (Boyz II Men featuring Method Man, Treach, Craig Mack and Busta Rhymes)	1995											12"
"Ice Cream" (Raekwon featuring Method Man, Cappadonna and Ghostface Killah)	1995											Only Built 4 Cuban Linx...
"Shadowboxin'" (GZA featuring Method Man)	1995	67	41	10	—	—	—	—	—	—	—	Liquid Swords
"Wu-Tang Cream Team Line-Up" (Funkmaster Flex featuring Method Man, Harlem Hoodz, Inspectah Deck, Killa Sin, Raekwon)	1998											The Mix Tape, Vol. III
"Whatcha Gonna Do" (Jayo Felony featuring Method Man and DMX)	1998											Whatcha Gonna Do? / Hav Plenty (soundtrack)
"Pussy Pop" (Xzibit featuring Jayo Felony and Method Man)	1998	—	113	—	—	—	—	—	—	—	—	40 Dayz & 40 Nightz
"N 2 Gether Now" (Limp Bizkit featuring Method Man)	1999	70	53	17	—	—	42	28	—	95	184	Significant Other
"La Rhumba" (RZA featuring Method Man, Killa Sin and Beretta 9)	2001	—	98	—	—	—	—	—	—	—	—	Digital Bullet
"Round & Round (Remix)" (Jonell featuring Method Man)	2001	62	13	1	—	—	—	—	—	—	—	How High (soundtrack) / Soundbombing III
"Love @ 1st Sight" (Mary J. Blige featuring Method Man)	2003	22	10	—	34	49	36	56	23	23	18	Love & Life
"Still on It" (Ashanti featuring Paul Wall and Method Man)	2005	115	55	—	—	—	—	—	—	—	—	Collectables by Ashanti
"New Wu" (Raekwon featuring Method Man and Ghostface Killah)	2009	—	—	—	—	—	—	—	—	—	—	Only Built 4 Cuban Linx... Pt. II
"House of Flying Daggers" (Raekwon featuring Method Man, Inspectah Deck and Ghostface Killah)	2009											Only Built 4 Cuban Linx... Pt. II
"The Pit" (Doctor P & Adam F featuring Method Man)	2013	—	—	—	—	—	—	—	—	—	—	The Pit
"Trillmatic" (ASAP Mob featuring ASAP Nast and Method Man)	2013	—	—	—	—	—	—	—	—	—	193	L.O.R.D.
"Masterpiece" (The Wow featuring Method Man)	2015											Landry
"Goodbyes" (The Knocks featuring Method Man)	2018	—	—	—	—	—	—	—	—	—	—	New York Narcotic
"Hot Damn" (Blimes featuring Method Man)	2018											Hot Damn
"Gonna Love Me (Remix)" (Teyana Taylor featuring Method Man, Ghostface Killah and Raekwon)	2018											K.T.S.E.
"Cash Rules" (Iyla featuring Method Man)	2020											Other Ways to Vent
"Lemon" (Conway the Machine featuring Method Man)	2020											From King to a God
"101 Razors" (Lloyd Banks featuring Method Man)	2023	—	—	—	—	—	—	—	—	—	—	The Course of the Inevitable 3
"Pair of Hammers" (Ghostface Killah featuring Method Man)	2024											Set the Tone (Guns & Roses)
"DBZ" (Your Old Droog featuring Method Man, Madlib, Denzel Curry)	2024											Movies
"—" denotes a recording that did not chart or was not released in that territory.

==== Other certified songs ====
Title	Year	Certifications	Album
"How High" (with Redman)	1995	RIAA: Gold	The Show

== Guest appearances ==
List of non-single guest appearances, with other performing artists, showing year released and album name
Title	Year	Other artist(s)	Album
"Scalp Dem (Wu-Tang Mix)"	1994	Super Cat	—N/a
"The What"	1994	The Notorious B.I.G.	Ready to Die
"Hard to Kill"	1994	Spice 1	AmeriKKKa's Nightmare
"Dirty Dancin'"	1995	Ol' Dirty Bastard	The Jerky Boys (soundtrack) / Return to the 36 Chambers
"Raw Hide"	1995	Ol' Dirty Bastard, Raekwon	Return to the 36 Chambers: The Dirty Version
"Wu-Gambinos"	1995	Raekwon, Ghostface Killah, RZA, Masta Killa	Only Built 4 Cuban Linx...
"Got the Flava"	1995	Showbiz & AG, D-Flow, Wali World, Party Arty	Goodfellas
"Wings of the Morning (Lil Jon & Pauls Mix)"	1995	Capleton	Prophecy
"It's in the Game"	1996	Ricky Watters	NFL Jams
"Box in Hand"	1996	Ghostface Killah, The Force M.D.s, Raekwon	Ironman
"Ill Na Na"	1996	Foxy Brown	Ill Na Na
"Extortion"	1996	Mobb Deep	Hell on Earth
"Supa Ninjas"	1998	Cappadonna, U-God	The Pillage
"Milk the Cow"	1998	Cappadonna	The Pillage
"Dart Throwing"	1998	Cappadonna, Raekwon	The Pillage
"This Is What We Do"	1998	Dru Hill	Enter the Dru
"And Justice for All"	1998	RZA, Islord, Killa Sin, P.R. Terrorist	Wu-Tang Killa Bees: The Swarm
"Collaboration '98"	1998	Sunz of Man, Hell Razah, Prodigal Sunn, True Master	The Last Shall Be First
"Next Up"	1998	Sunz of Man, 60 Second Assassin, Prodigal Sunn, Hell Razah	The Last Shall Be First
"Bulworth (They Talk About It)"	1998	Prodigy, Kam, KRS-One	Bulworth (soundtrack)
"One More to Go"	1998	Deadly Venoms, Inspectah Deck, GZA, Cappadonna, Street Life	Antidote
"Gunz 'N Onez"	1998	Heltah Skeltah	Magnum Force
"NYC Everything"	1998	RZA	Bobby Digital in Stereo
"Half Man Half Amazin"	1998	Pete Rock	Soul Survivor
"Stringplay"	1999	GZA	Beneath the Surface
"Rumble"	1999	U-God, Leatha Face, Inspectah Deck	Golden Arms Redemption
"Fuck Them"	1999	Raekwon	Immobilarity
"Am I My Brothers Keeper"	1999	Shyheim, Infamous Bluesteele	Manchild
"Three Amigos (If It's On)"	1999	Popa Wu, King Just, Sic	Visions of the 10th Chamber
"True"	1999	Funkmaster Flex	The Tunnel
"Know Your Role (The Rock's Theme)"	2000	—N/a	WWF Aggression
"Like You Do"	2000	Kelly Price	Mirror Mirror
"Ghetto Celebrity"	2000	Roni Size, Reprazent	In the Mode
"What the Beat"	2001	DJ Clue, Eminem, Royce da 5'9"	The Professional, Pt. 2
"Simmons Incorporated"	2001	Run DMC	Crown Royal
"Glocko Pop"	2001	RZA, Masta Killa, Streetlife	Digital Bullet
"U Remind Me (Remix)"	2001	Usher, Blu Cantrell	8701
"Se Acabo" (Remix)	2001	The Beatnuts	Take It or Squeeze It
"Flowers"	2001	Ghostface Killah, Raekwon, Superb	Bulletproof Wallets
"Float On with Us (Classic Extended Version)"	2001	Full Force, Silkk The Shocker, Funkmaster Flex, Allure, Bam-Bué	Still Standing
"The Cause"	2002	Sunz of Man	Saviorz Day
"Bring the Pain"	2002	Missy Elliott	Under Construction
"Ice Cream Pt. 2"	2003	Raekwon, Cappadonna	The Lex Diamond Story
"Respect Mine"	2003	Mathematics, Raekwon, Cappadonna	Love, Hell or Right
"Thank U (Da DJ's Version)"	2003	Mathematics, Ghostface Killah, Angela Neal	Love, Hell or Right
"Big Plans"	2003	Ginuwine	The Senior
"Secret Rivals"	2004	Masta Killa, Killah Priest	No Said Date
"The Drummer"	2004	Theodore Unit, Streetlife	718
"Rock Steady"	2004	Tony Touch, Raekwon, U-God	The Piece Maker 2
"Nothing Wrong"	2005	Junior MAFIA	Riot Musik
"Head Rush"	2005	Mathematics	The Problem
"John 3:16"	2005	Mathematics, Panama P.I.	The Problem
"Spot Lite"	2005	Mathematics, U-God, Inspectah Deck, Cappadonna	The Problem
"Shoot on Sight (S.O.S.)"	2005	Streetlife	Street Education
"All My Niggas"	2005	Streetlife	Street Education
"Street Education"	2005	Streetlife	Street Education
"High Rollers"	2005	Proof, B-Real	Searching for Jerry Garcia
"Gangsta Rappers"	2005	Speedy, Prodigy	Flight Risk
"Get It In"	2006	Tyrese	Alter Ego
"Iron God Chamber"	2006	Masta Killa, U-God, RZA	Made in Brooklyn
"Millennium Line Up"	2006	Solomon Childs, Son Don Moet	The Wake
"Yolanda's House"	2007	Ghostface Killah, Raekwon	The Big Doe Rehab
"Paisley Darts"	2007	Ghostface Killah, Raekwon, Sun God, Trife da God, Cappadonna	The Big Doe Rehab
"Killa Lipstick"	2007	Ghostface Killah, Masta Killa	The Big Doe Rehab
"The Truth"	2007	Raekwon	The Vatican Mixtape
"Intoxicated"	2007	Ol' Dirty Bastard, Raekwon, Macy Gray	A Son Unique
"Hold It Down"	2007	DJ Jazzy Jeff	The Return of the Magnificent
"In the Name of Allah"	2007	Cilvaringz, Masta Killa, Killah Priest, RZA, Shabazz the Disciple	I
"What It Is"	2007	Keith Murray, 50 Grand	Rap-Murr-Phobia
"Safe Box"	2008	La the Darkman, Streetlife	Return of the Darkman
"This Thing"	2008	La the Darkman, RZA	Return of the Darkman
"Tell Lies Vision"	2008	La the Darkman, Streetlife	Return of the Darkman
"N.A.S.A. Music"	2009	N.A.S.A., E-40	The Spirit of Apollo
"Assed Out"	2010	GZA	Pollen: the Swarm
"M.E.F."	2010	—N/a	Pollen: the Swarm
"Every Soldier in the Hood"	2011	Raekwon	Shaolin vs. Wu-Tang
"From the Hills"	2011	Raekwon, Raheem DeVaughn	Shaolin vs. Wu-Tang
"Diesel Fluid"	2011	Trife Diesel, Cappadonna	Legendary Weapons
"Luke Skywalker"	2011	Omarion	The Awakening
"C'est la vie"	2011	Soprano	C'est la Vie!
"CT 2 Shaolin"	2012	Chris Webby	Bars on Me
"Pull tha Cars Out"	2012	Ghostface Killah, Sheek Louch	Wu Block
"Stella"	2012	Ghostface Killah, Sheek Louch	Wu Block
"Men of Respect"	2013	Mathematics, Eyes-Low, Raekwon, Bad Luck, Termanology, Cappadonna	Prelude to the Answer
"4 Horsemen"	2013	Mathematics, Inspectah Deck, Raekwon, Ghostface Killah	The Answer
"Late Night Bluff"	2013	J-Love	Flood Gates
"Fire"	2013	U-God, Scotty Wotty	The Keynote Speaker
"Let Me Explain"	2013	Snoop Dogg, Erick Sermon	That's My Work 2
"Wild Things"	2013	Mack Wilds	New York: A Love Story
"Nightcrawler"	2015	Inspectah Deck, 7L & Esoteric	Every Hero Needs a Villain
"The Sequel"	2016	Intell	—N/a
"The One"	2016	Triggerfinger	—N/a
"I Reminisce"	2016	Snowgoons, Sean Strange	Goon Rap
"Buck 50's & Bullet Wounds"	2016	The Alchemist, Havoc	The Silent Partner
"Bulletproof Love"	2016	Adrian Younge	Luke Cage (soundtrack)
"Point of View"	2016	Banks & Steelz	Anything But Words
"Opera"	2017	RDGLDGRN	Untitled LP
"Clans & Clicks"	2017	Sean Price, Smif-N-Wessun, Rock, Raekwon, Inspectah Deck, Foul Monday, Nottz	Imperius Rex
"Camp-Wu"	2017	Rock, Inspectah Deck	Rockness A.P.
"Shine"	2017	M-Dot, Dominique Larue, Katy Gunn	Ego and the Enemy
"Ting Dun"	2018	Ocean Wisdom	Wizville
"XXX"	2018	U-God	Venom
"Hot Box"	2018	JID, Joey Badass	DiCaprio 2
"Still Trill"	2019	Bun B, Statik Selektah, Grafh	TrillStatik
"Set in Stone"	2019	Termanology, Dame Grease	—N/a
"Eat Your Feelings"	2019	Open Mike Eagle, Video Dave	The New Negroes (Season 1 Soundtrack)
"Me Denny & Darryl"	2019	Ghostface Killah, Cappadonna	Ghostface Killahs
"New Generation (Remix)"	2020	2nd Generation Wu	Hereditary
"Circus"	2020	R-Mean, Scot Storch, Kabaka Pyramid	—N/a
"Hard Living"	2020	Statik Selektah, Dave East	The Balancing Act
"Zodiac Killah"	2021	DJ Nu-Mark	—N/a
"Pain"	2021	Page Kennedy, Elzhi	—N/a
"Outta Line"	2021	N.O.R.E., Conway the Machine	—N/a
"Heat 7"	2021	Papoose	September
"Live by the Code"	2021	Justin Tyme, Raekwon, Ransom	Nicolas Craven Versions
"El Matador"	2021	Mic Nickels	—N/a
"Beastie Boyz"	2022	Rockness MOsta	Ether Rocks
"Rap Niggaz (Remix)"	2022	Bill Collector	—N/a
"Odyssey (Remix)"	2022	Daniel Lee Bellamy	—N/a
"Invisible Ether"	2022	Vinnie Paz	Tortured in the Name of God's Unconditional Love
"Unbelievable"	2022	Dave East	HDIGH
"Unpredictable"	2023	Statik Selektah, Inspectah Deck, Raekwon, Ghostface Killah	Round Trip
"Smoke"	2023	JoJo Pellegrino	Vintage
"Subpar"	2023	Prof	Horse
"Metropolis"	2023	DJ Muggs, Slick Rick	Soul Assassins 3
"All Fire"	2023	Hanz On, Iron Mike	Carthage
"Wordplay"	2023	Hanz On	Carthage
"Highway to Heaven"	2023	Hanz On, Inspectah Deck	Carthage
"Roll Call"	2024	Ras Kass, RJ Payne, Lil' Fame, Sway Calloway	Roll Call
"Meth Back!"	2024	Conway the Machine, SK da King, Flee Lord	Slant Face Killa
"Sign of Se7en	2024	Rakim, Prodigy, X-Raided	REB7RTH
"Step"	2024	Ocean Wisdom	Fight Club
"Muggsy Bogues"	2024	Marlon Craft	The Long Game
"Speshal Methods"	2024	.38 Spesh, TI-Lar Bee	Mother & Gun
"Fight for Love"	2024	Grafh	God's Timing
"The Light"	2024	Aaron Malik	—N/a
"M.A.N."	2024	Nino Man	—N/a
"The Workload"	2024	Skyzoo	—N/a
"Skyscrapers"	2024	Snoop Dogg, Smitty	Missionary
"Searchin"	2025	Keri Hilson	We Need to Talk
"Ricky Bobby"	2025	Rome Streetz	Trainspotting
"Victoria"	2025	Chedda Bang, Inspectah Deck	—N/a
"By Any Means Necessary"	2025	Dave East, Ransom	The Final Call
"Ammunition"	2025	Termnalogy & Sumit	MADE
"600 School"	2025	Raekwon, Ghostface Killah	The Emperor's New Clothes
"The Trial"	2025	Ghostface Killah, GZA, Reek da Villian, Pills	Supreme Clientele 2
"You Ma Friend"	2025	Ghostface Killah	Supreme Clientele 2
"Fred Samuel Playground"	2025	Big L	Harlem's Finest: Return of the King
"Tenderism"	2026	D12	D12 Forever Vol. 1

== See also ==
- Method Man & Redman discography
- Wu-Tang Clan discography
