= Method Man & Redman =

American hip hop duo

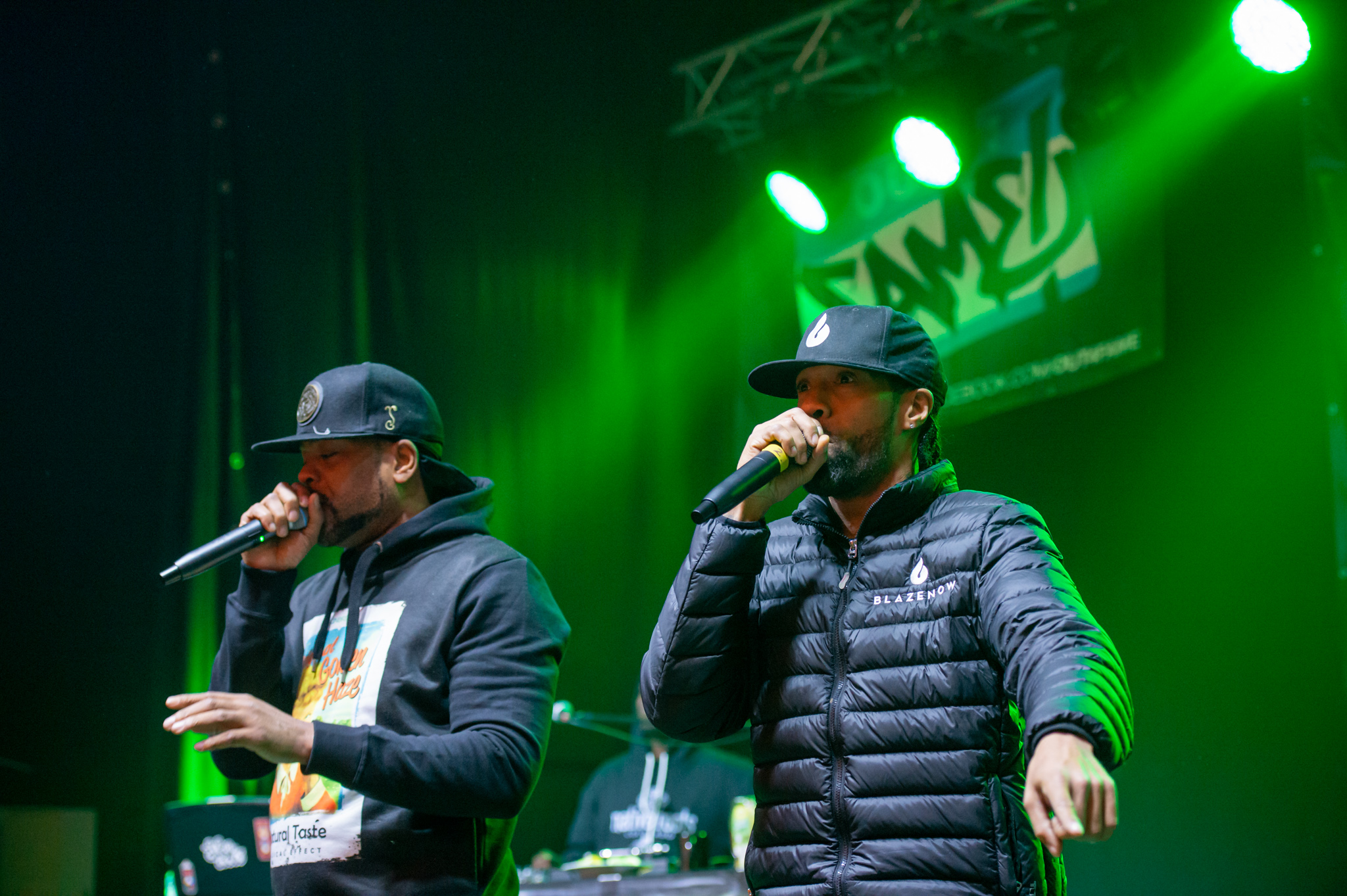
- Method Man (left) performing with Redman (right) in Germany in 2016

Background information
- Genre: Hip-hop
- Years active: 1994–present
- Label: Def Jam
- Spinoff of: Wu-Tang Clan; Def Squad
- Members: Method Man; Redman

Method Man & Redman (also referred to as Meth & Red, Red & Mef, John Blaze and Funk Doc or Funk Doctor Spock and Johnny Blaze) are an American hip-hop duo composed of rappers Method Man (of Wu-Tang Clan) and Redman (of Def Squad). They are signed to Def Jam Recordings both as solo artists and as a duo. While they had been collaborating since 1994, it was not until 1999 that they released a full-length collaborative effort, Blackout!. The follow-up album, Blackout! 2, was released in 2009.

Method Man often gives a shout out to Redman on tracks that do not feature Redman; this usually comes in the form of "What up, Doc!" referring to Redman's alias "Funk Doctor Spock". In 2001, they starred alongside each other as leading roles in the stoner film How High. In 2004, the duo also starred in a short-lived Fox sitcom, titled Method & Red, however they later disowned the series due to lack of creative control.

== History ==
The duo have known each other for a long time before signing with Def Jam. While at Def Jam, they reunited in 1994 on tour and met again in 1995 in the recording studio of West Coast hip hop legend Tupac "2Pac" Shakur. They recorded "Got My Mind Made Up" for Shakur's multi-platinum album All Eyez on Me (1996). After this they had friendly battles freestyling with each other on Yo! MTV Raps, which ultimately led to their collaborative debut single "How High". In 1999, the two rappers appeared together on "Rap Phenomenon" from The Notorious B.I.G. posthumous album Born Again.

On May 7, 2009, in promotion for their second studio album, Method Man & Redman released a mixtape titled Lights Out, which was hosted by DJ Green Lantern. In 2013, Method Man and Redman previewed a new track called "Lookin’ Fly Too" featuring Ehikmostz.

In March 2025, during a podcast interview, Redman claimed that his "circle was very small", confirming that he and Method Man "don't hang out like [they] usually do" on a collaborative level, due to personal reasons. As this statement was made public, the future of the duo remains unknown.

== Discography ==
=== Studio albums ===
List of studio albums, with selected chart positions, sales figures and certifications
Title	Album details	Peak chart positions									Sales	Certifications
Title	Album details	US	US R&B	US Rap	CAN	FRA	GER	NLD	SWI	UK	Sales	Certifications
Blackout!	Released: September 28, 1999 (US); Label: Def Jam; Formats: CD, LP, cassette	3	1	12	3	33	36	36	—	45	US: 1,575,000	RIAA: Platinum; BPI: Gold; MC: Platinum
Blackout! 2	Released: May 19, 2009 (US); Label: Def Jam; Formats: CD, LP, digital download	7	2	2	10	67	66	—	6	—	US: 147,000	
"—" denotes a recording that did not chart or was not released in that territory.

=== Soundtracks ===
List of studio albums, with selected chart positions, sales figures and certifications
Title	Album details	Peak chart positions		Sales	Certifications
Title	Album details	US	US R&B	Sales	Certifications
How High: The Soundtrack	Released: December 11, 2001 (US); Label: Def Jam; Formats: CD, LP, cassette	38	6		
"—" denotes a recording that did not chart or was not released in that territory.

=== Mixtapes ===
List of mixtapes
Title	Album details
Lights Out	Released: May 7, 2009 (US); Label: Self-released; Formats: Digital download

=== Singles ===
List of singles as lead artist, with selected chart positions and certifications, showing year released and album name
Title	Year	Peak chart positions							Certifications	Album
Title	Year	US	US R&B	US Rap	FRA	GER	SWI	UK	Certifications	Album
"How High"	1995	13	10	2	—	—	—	—	RIAA: Gold	The Show (soundtrack)
"Tear It Off"	1999	—	52	16	—	—	—	—		Blackout! / In Too Deep (soundtrack)
"Da Rockwilder"	1999	—	51	14	181	—	—	—		Blackout!
"Y.O.U."	2000	—	69	18	—	—	—	—		Blackout!
"Part II" (featuring Toni Braxton)	2001	72	28	5	—	23	54	98		How High (soundtrack)
"A-Yo" (featuring Saukrates)	2009	—	113	—	—	—	—	—		Blackout! 2
"City Lights" (featuring Bun B)	2009	—	—	—	—	—	—	—		Blackout! 2
"Mrs. International" (featuring Erick Sermon)	2009	—	—	—	—	—	—	—		Blackout! 2
"—" denotes a recording that did not chart or was not released in that territory.

==== As featured artist ====
List of singles as featured artist, with selected chart positions, showing year released and album name
Title	Year	Peak chart positions						Album
Title	Year	US	US R&B	US Rap	BEL (WA)	FRA	SWI	Album
"4, 3, 2, 1" (LL Cool J featuring Method Man & Redman, Master P, Canibus and DMX)	1997	75	24	10	—	—	—	Phenomenon
"Symphony 2000" (EPMD featuring Lady Luck, Method Man & Redman	1999							Out of Business
"Left & Right" (D'Angelo featuring Method Man & Redman)	2000	70	18	—	—	—	—	Voodoo
"Noble Art" (IAM featuring Method Man & Redman)	2003	—	—	—	66	34	81	Revoir un Printemps
"Ol' Thang Back" (Juelz Santana featuring Jadakiss, Busta Rhymes, Method Man & Redman)	2016	—	—	—	—	—	—	TBA
"—" denotes a recording that did not chart or was not released in that territory.

=== Appearances together ===
List of non-single guest appearances, with other performing artists, showing year released and album name
Title	Year	Other artist(s)	Album
"Freestyle"	1995	Funkmaster Flex	The Mix Tape Volume 1 (60 Minutes of Funk)
"Got My Mind Made Up"	1996	2Pac, Tha Dogg Pound	All Eyez on Me
"Do What Ya Feel"	1996	—N/a	Muddy Waters
"Big Dogs"	1998	—N/a	Tical 2000: Judgement Day
"Well All Rite Cha"	1998	—N/a	Doc's da Name 2000
"Simon Says" (Remix)	1999	Pharoahe Monch, Lady Luck, Shabaam Sahdeeq, Busta Rhymes	Internal Affairs
"Rap Phenomenon"	1999	The Notorious B.I.G.	Born Again
"Buck 50"	2000	Ghostface Killah, Cappadonna	Supreme Clientele
"Fuhgidabowdit"	2000	LL Cool J, DMX	G.O.A.T.
"2 Tears in a Bucket"	2000	Ruff Ryders, Sheek Louch	Ryde or Die Vol. 2
"Rollin' (Urban Assault Vehicle)"	2000	Limp Bizkit, DMX	Chocolate Starfish and the Hot Dog Flavored Water/The Fast and the Furious (soundtrack)
"Get It Up (Remix)"	2000	Sticky Fingaz, Xzibit	"Get It Up" single
"Dog in Heat"	2001	Missy Elliott	Miss E... So Addictive
"Who You Be"	2001	Outsidaz	The Bricks
"Enjoy da Ride"	2001	Saukrates, Streetlife	Malpractice
"Cisco Kid"	2001	Cypress Hill, WAR	How High The Soundtrack
"America's Most"	2001	—N/a	How High The Soundtrack
"Let's Do It"	2001	—N/a	How High The Soundtrack
"Red, Meth & Bee"	2001	Cypress Hill	Stoned Raiders
"I Get It Started"	2001	Mystikal	Tarantula
"Good Times (I Get High Remix)"	2002	Styles P, Jin	—N/a
"Rock & Roll"	2002	Naughty by Nature	IIcons
"Lyrical 44"	2003	Damian Marley	Def Jamaica
"We Some Dogs"	2004	Snoop Dogg, Kon Artis	Tical 0: The Prequel
"Redman & Method Man, Pt. 1"	2004	Sway & King Tech	Wake Up Show: Freestyles, Vol. 8
"Redman & Method Man, Pt. 2"	2004	Sway & King Tech	Wake Up Show: Freestyles, Vol. 8
"Walk On"	2006	—N/a	4:21... The Day After
"Blow Treez"	2007	Ready Roc	Red Gone Wild: Thee Album
"Funk Doc & Mef Tical"	2007	—N/a	Hiero Meets Wu: From Oakland to Shaolin
"Wait a Minute"	2007	The Soundscannerz	The Resume
"Self Construction""	2008	KRS-One, Talib Kweli, Busta Rhymes, David Banner, Nelly, Styles P, The Game, Ne-Yo	—N/a
"Troublemakers"	2010	Ghostface Killah, Raekwon	Apollo Kids
"Lite 1 Witcha Boi"	2010	Bun B	Reggie
"Look"	2011	Erick Sermon	Breath of Fresh Air
"Welcome to the Academy"	2011	The Academy	Terminal 3 Presents: The Academy
"Cypher"	2013	Hit-Boy, Kent M$NEY, Audio Push, B Mac The Queen, Raekwon, Casey Veggies, Xzibit, Rick Ross, Schoolboy Q	All I’ve Ever Dreamed Of
"Let's Go"	2013	Tony Touch, Erick Sermon	The Piece Maker 3: Return of the 50 MC's
"Rite"	2013	Loaded Lux	You Gon Get This Work
"Straight Gutta"	2015	Hanz On, Streetlife	The Meth Lab
"Clutch"	2015	Erick Sermon	E.S.P. (Erick Sermon's Perception)
"Mount Kushmore"	2017	Snoop Dogg, B-Real	Neva Left
"Hood Go Bang"	2017	Wu-Tang Clan	The Saga Continues
"Therapy"	2017	Masta Killa	Loyalty Is Royalty
"Episode 5 – Wild Cats"	2018	Streetlife, Hanz On	Meth Lab Season 2: The Lithium
"Keep on Gassin'"	2019	E-40, Bosko	Practice Makes Paper
"Bad Name" (Remix)	2020	Gang Starr	—N/a
"Alright"	2021	Nefertitti Avani	Snoop Dogg Presents Algorithm
"Live from the Meth Lab"	2022	KRS-One, JoJo Pellegrino	Meth Lab Season 3: The Rehab
"Lalala"	2024	—N/a	Muddy Waters Too
"Type Dangerous" (The Remix of the Gods)	2025	Mariah Carey, Busta Rhymes	Type Dangerous (The Remixes EP)

- 1994: Buddha Brotherz Freestyle
- 1994: Freestyle
- 1995: Double Deuces (St. Ide's Malt Liquor Commercial)
- 1995: "Tonight's Da Night Freestyle"
- 1995: Yo! MTV Raps (Last Episode Freestyle) (with Craig Mack, Large Pro, & Special Ed)
- 1996: Funk Flex Freestyle
- 1999: "Redman Freestyle" from Drunken Master's Drunken Style
- 2000: "Rap City Freestyle" (Feat. Big Tigger)
- 2003: Brownsugar Freestyle
- 2004: "Method & Red TV Show Theme Song"
- 2005: "Pixie Rap" from the TV show The Fairly OddParents, special School's Out! The Musical as the rapping voices of Head Pixie and Sanderson respectively.
- 2008: "Broken Language 2008"

== See also ==
- Method Man discography
- Redman discography
- East Coast hip hop
