= A-Yo (Method Man & Redman song) =

Single by Method Man & Redman featuring Saukrates

from the album Blackout! 2
- Released: March 31, 2009
- Recorded: 2008
- Genre: East Coast hip hop
- Length: 3:48
- Label: Def Jam
- Songwriters: Clifford Smith, Reggie Noble, Peter Phillips
- Producer: Pete Rock

Method Man & Redman singles chronology
"Part II" (2001)	"A-Yo" (2009)	"Mrs. International" (2009)

Redman singles chronology
"Put It Down" (2007)	"A-Yo" (2009)	"Mrs. International" (2009)

Method Man singles chronology
"Say" (2006)	"A-Yo" (2009)	"Mrs. International" (2009)

"A-Yo" is a song by American hip hop duo Method Man & Redman, released on March 31, 2009, as the first single from their third studio album, Blackout! 2 (2009). The song was produced by Pete Rock and features vocals from Canadian rapper Saukrates. A video for the song was released on April 9, 2009. The song contains a sample of "Magic Mona", as performed by Phyllis Hyman.

== Charts ==
Chart (2009)	Peak position
U.S. Billboard Bubbling Under R&B/Hip-Hop Singles	13
