= Put It Down =

Put It Down may refer to:

- "Put It Down" (Redman song), 2007
- "Put It Down" (T-Pain & Ray L song), 2007
- "Put It Down" (Bun B song), 2010
- "Put It Down" (Brandy song), 2012
- "Put It Down" (South Park), an episode from the twenty-first season of the series South Park
