= Mrs. International (song) =

2021 single by Method Man & Redman featuring Erick Sermon

Single by Method Man & Redman featuring Erick Sermon

from the album Blackout! 2
- Released: May 5, 2009
- Recorded: 2008
- Genre: Hip hop; R&B
- Length: 3:53
- Label: Island Def Jam Music Group
- Songwriters: Clifford Smith, Reggie Noble, Anthony Best
- Producer: Buckwild

Method Man & Redman singles chronology
"A-Yo" (2009)	"Mrs. International" (2009)

Redman singles chronology
"A-Yo" (2009)	"Mrs. International" (2009)	"Our Dreams" (2010)

Method Man singles chronology
"A-Yo" (2009)	"Mrs. International" (2009)	"Coc Back" (2009)

"Mrs. International" is a song by American hip hop duo Method Man & Redman, released on May 5, 2009, as the third single from their second studio album, Blackout! 2 (2009). The song was produced by Buckwild. The song is also noted for its reference and sample use of Tweet's single, "Call Me".

== Music video ==
The music video, directed by Dale Restighini (a.k.a. RAGE) and Kevin James Custer, was released on June 25, 2009. The video appeared as the "New Joint of the Day" on BET's 106 & Park on July 6, 2009. Cameo appearances are made by "Rabbit" from Real Chance of Love and "Myamee" from Flavor of Love 3.
