= Da Rockwilder =

Single by Method Man & Redman

from the album Blackout!
- B-side: "1, 2, 1, 2"
- Released: 1999
- Genre: Hip hop
- Label: Def Jam
- Songwriters: Clifford Smith, Jr.; Reginald Noble; Dana Stinson
- Producer: Rockwilder

Method Man & Redman singles chronology
"Left & Right" (1999)	"Da Rockwilder" (1999)	"Y.O.U." (2000)

Redman singles chronology
"Left & Right" (1999)	"Da Rockwilder" (1999)	"Y.O.U." (2000)

Method Man singles chronology
"Left & Right" (1999)	"Da Rockwilder" (1999)	"N 2 Gether Now" (1999)

"Da Rockwilder" is a hip hop song written and performed by American rappers Method Man & Redman. It was released in 1999 through Def Jam Recordings as the second single off of the duo's first collaborative studio album Blackout!. Production was handled by Rockwilder. The song contains an interpolation of "Hand on the Pump" by Cypress Hill.

The single peaked at number 51 on the Hot R&B/Hip-Hop Songs chart, number 42 on the R&B/Hip-Hop Airplay chart, and number 14 on the Hot Rap Songs chart in the United States, and number 181 on the French SNEP Top 200 Singles chart. It also made it to the number 12 on the Official Hip Hop and R&B Singles Chart in the UK.

The song was used in Gone In 60 Seconds, More Music from Save the Last Dance and How High - The Soundtrack.

== Music video ==
An accompanying music video, directed by Dave Meyers, received a 'Music Video of the Year' nomination at the 2000 Source Awards. In 2013, Complex ranked it at No. 28 on its 'The 50 Best Rap Videos of the '90s' list.

== Track listing ==
12" vinyl
No.	Title	Writer(s)	Producer(s)	Length
1.	"Da Rockwilder" (Radio Edit)	Clifford Smith; Reggie Noble; Dana Stinson	Rockwilder
2.	"Da Rockwilder" (LP Version)	Smith; Noble; Stinson	Rockwilder
3.	"Da Rockwilder" (Instrumental)		Rockwilder
4.	"1, 2, 1, 2" (Radio Edit)	Smith; Noble; George Spivey	DJ Scratch
5.	"1, 2, 1, 2" (LP Version)	Smith; Noble; Spivey	DJ Scratch
6.	"1, 2, 1, 2" (Instrumental)		DJ Scratch

== Charts ==
Chart (1999-2000)	Peak position
US Hot R&B/Hip-Hop Songs (Billboard)	51
US R&B/Hip-Hop Airplay (Billboard)	42
US Hot Rap Songs (Billboard)	14

Chart (2005)	Peak position
UK Hip Hop/R&B (Official Charts)	12

Chart (2013)	Peak position
France (SNEP)	181
