= How High (song) =

Single by Method Man & Redman

from the album The Show: The Soundtrack and Blackout!
- Released: August 15, 1995
- Recorded: 1994
- Genre: East Coast hip hop; alternative hip hop
- Length: 4:41
- Label: Def Jam
- Songwriters: Reggie Noble; Erick Sermon; Clifford Smith
- Producer: Erick Sermon

Method Man & Redman singles chronology
"How High" (1995)	"Symphony 2000" (1999)

Redman singles chronology
"The Points" (1995)	"How High" (1995)	"Funkorama" (1995)

Method Man singles chronology
"I'll Be There for You/You're All I Need to Get By" (1995)	"How High" (1995)	"Ice Cream" (1995)

"How High" is a song by American hip hop duo Method Man & Redman, released on August 15, 1995, as the duo's first single. It was originally featured on the soundtrack to the 1995 hip hop documentary film, The Show, and has since appeared on several compilation albums such as The Hip Hop Box and Def Jam's Greatest Hits, among several others. The song, produced by Erick Sermon, is the first official collaboration from longtime friends and East Coast rappers Method Man of Wu-Tang Clan and Redman of Def Squad, marking their debut as a duo. The song performed exceptionally well commercially, reaching number 13 on the US Billboard Hot 100 chart. The single has since been certified gold by the Recording Industry Association of America (RIAA).

== Track listing ==
A-side

1. How High (LP Version) (4:41)
2. How High (Remix Radio Edit) (3:59)

B-side

1. How High (Remix) (3:59)
2. How High (Instrumental) (3:49)
3. How High (Acapella) (3:59)

== Legacy ==
Redman's vocals on the third verse was sampled on American electro house DJ Armand Van Helden's 1996 single, "The Funk Phenomena". The song was later sampled on Guilty Simpson's "Yikes!".

== Charts ==
Chart (1995)	Peak position
US Billboard Hot 100	13
US Billboard Hot R&B/Hip-Hop Songs	10
US Billboard Rap Songs	2

== Certifications ==
Region	Certification	Certified units/sales
United States (RIAA)	Gold	500,000^{^}
^{^} Shipments figures based on certification alone.

== Remix and sequel ==
The duo later remixed the song and included it on their collaborative debut album Blackout! (1999), as well as the soundtrack to their 2001 film, How High. The "How High (Remix)", has a stripped-down sound and contains samples from "Fly Robin Fly", as performed by Silver Convention and "I Am Woman", as performed by The Cover Girls. This remix was also used in the official music video for the song that was released in the summer of 1996.

Also featured on the soundtrack was the song's sequel, simply titled "Part II". It was released as a single in 2001, in promotion for the film. The song samples American R&B singer-songwriter Toni Braxton's "You're Makin' Me High" and peaked at number 72 on the US Billboard Hot 100 chart.

=== Chart placements for "Part II" ===
Chart (2001–2002)	Peak position
Australia (ARIA)	93
Germany (GfK)	23
Switzerland (Schweizer Hitparade)	54
UK Singles (OCC)	98
US Billboard Hot 100	72
US Hot R&B/Hip-Hop Songs (Billboard)	28
US Hot Rap Songs (Billboard)	5
