= The Meth Lab =

Studio album by Method Man
- Released: August 21, 2015
- Recorded: 2013–2015
- Genre: Hip-hop
- Length: 55:36
- Labels: Hanz On; Tommy Boy
- Producers: Hanz On (exec.); Ettore Mazzei (exec.); 4th Disciple; Cee the Architek; Code Red; Daez; Don't Panic Ent.; J57; Level 13; Mathematics; Pascal Zumaque; Ron Browz; Zarko Krstic

Method Man chronology
4:21... The Day After (2006)	The Meth Lab (2015)	Meth Lab Season 2: The Lithium (2018)

Wu-Tang Clan solo chronology
Fly International Luxurious Art (2015)	The Meth Lab (2015)	The Pillage 2 (2015)

The Meth Lab is the fifth studio album by American rapper and Wu-Tang Clan member Method Man. The album was released on August 21, 2015, under Hanz On Music and Tommy Boy Entertainment. His first album since 2006's 4:21... The Day After, the album features guest appearances from Redman, Hanz On, Street Life, and Wu-Tang Clan members Raekwon, Inspectah Deck and Masta Killa. It was recorded in Staten Island at Track Stars Studios on VanDuzer Street under the supervision of executive producer Hanz On and producer/engineer Pascal Zumaque.

== Critical reception ==
Professional ratings
Aggregate scores
Source	Rating
Metacritic	59/100
Review scores
Source	Rating
AllMusic	3.5/5 stars
Billboard	2.5/5 stars
Consequence of Sound	B
Drowned in Sound	5/10
Exclaim!	6/10
HipHopDX	3/5
Mojo	3/5 stars
Pitchfork	4.0/10
RapReviews	4/10
Rolling Stone	3/5 stars

The Meth Lab received mixed reviews from music critics. At Metacritic, which assigns a normalized rating out of 100 to reviews from mainstream critics, the album received an average score of 59 based on 11 reviews, which indicates "mixed or average reviews". David Jeffries of AllMusic gave the album three and a half stars out of five, saying "Uncle Murda, Streetlife, and Hanz On appear often, making this LP close in structure to the crew-focused Theodore Unit releases from Ghostface, but that's not a complaint as much as a caution. Consider this a Meth-led posse LP aimed at returning fans, and a very good one at that." Paul Cantor of Billboard said, "Method's skill and charisma are by far the highlight of The Meth Lab, but there's not enough of him to make this unremarkable compilation pop." Del F. Cowie of Exclaim! stated, "Too often, the album is weighed down by pedantic, average beats and too many run of the mill guest verses, indicating Meth's generosity is a bit of a weakness. Ultimately, it dilutes The Meth Lab's potency." Andrew Gretchko of HipHopDX said, "The Meth Lab may be Method Man’s return to solo work, but without a true connection between the tracks the album feels more like a mixtape than an album, a string of songs that range from uninspiring to a reminder that Method Man was once one of Hip Hop’s elite."

== Track listing ==
The Meth Lab track listing
No.	Title	Writer(s)	Producer(s)	Length
1.	"Intro"	Clifford Smith, Jr.		0:18
2.	"The Meth Lab" (featuring Hanz On and Street Life)	Smith, Jr.; Patrick Charles	Cee the Architek	2:54
3.	"Straight Gutta" (featuring Redman, Hanz On and Street Life)	Smith, Jr.; Reginald Noble; Charles	Ron Browz	3:59
4.	"Bang Zoom" (featuring Hanz On, Street Life and Eazy Get Rite)	Smith, Jr.; Charles; Eazy Get Rite	Level 13	3:47
5.	"50 Shots" (featuring Mack Wilds, Street Life and Cory Gunz)	Smith, Jr.; Peter Corey Pankey, Jr.; Charles; Tristan Paul Mack Wilds	P. Version; Don't Panic Ent.	3:58
6.	"The Pledge" (Hanz On and Street Life)	Charles	Mathematics	1:10
7.	"2 Minutes of Your Time"	Smith, Jr.; Ronald Maurice Bean	Mathematics	2:06
8.	"Worldwide" (featuring Hanz On, Uncle Murda and Chedda Bang)	Smith, Jr.; Leonard Carl Grant	P. Version; Don't Panic Ent.	3:27
9.	"Soundcheck" (featuring Hanz On and Carlton Fisk)	Smith, Jr.; George Cooney	P. Version; Code Red	2:27
10.	"Water" (featuring Chedda Bang)	Smith, Jr.; Chedda Bang	P. Version; Code Red	3:25
11.	"Lifestyles" (Cardi, Eazy Get Rite and Freaky Marciano)	Eazy Get Rite; Freaky Marciano	P. Version	4:10
12.	"The Purple Tape" (featuring Raekwon and Inspectah Deck)	Smith, Jr.; Corey Woods; Jason Richard Hunter; Akie Bermiss; James Victor Heinz; Anthony Messado	Akie Bermiss; J57	3:24
13.	"Intelligent Meth" (featuring Masta Killa, Street Life and iNTeLL)	Smith, Jr.; Charles; Dontae L. Hawkins	4th Disciple	4:01
14.	"Symphony" (featuring Hanz On, Street Life, Kash Verrazano, Carlton Fisk and Killa Sin)	Smith, Jr.; Jeryl Grant; Charles; Cooney; Kash Verrazano; Messado	Daez	3:20
15.	"What You Getting Into" (featuring Street Life and Donny Cacsh)	Smith, Jr.; Charles; Donny Cacsh	P. Version	3:38
16.	"Another Winter" (featuring Hanz On, Street Life and Carlton Fisk)	Smith, Jr.; Charles; Cooney; ANSON	4th Disciple	3:32
17.	"Rain All Day" (featuring Hanz On and Dro Pesci)	Smith, Jr.; Frederick J. Gatto	Daez	2:42
18.	"So Staten" (featuring Hanz On and Hue Hef)	Smith, Jr.; Hue Hef; Pascal Zumaque; Zartical; Isaac Hanson; Taylor Hanson; Zac Hanson	P. Version; Zartical	3:43
19.	"Outro"	Smith, Jr.		0:15
Total length:				55:36

Deluxe edition bonus tracks
No.	Title	Producer(s)	Length
20.	"The Meth Lab" (Instrumental)	Cee the Architek	2:37
21.	"Straight Gutta" (Instrumental)	Ron Browz	3:36
22.	"Bang Zoom" (Instrumental)	Level 13	3:49
23.	"50 Shots" (Instrumental)	P. Version; Don't Panic Ent.	3:56
24.	"The Pledge" (Instrumental)	Mathematics	0:52
25.	"2 Minutes of Your Time" (Instrumental)	Mathematics	2:09
26.	"Worldwide" (Instrumental)	P. Version; Don't Panic Ent.	3:02
27.	"Soundcheck" (Instrumental)	P. Version; Code Red	2:13
28.	"Water" (Instrumental)	P. Version; Code Red	3:24
29.	"Lifestyles" (Instrumental)	P. Version	2:52
30.	"The Purple Tape" (Instrumental)	Akie Bermiss; J57	3:25
31.	"Intelligent Meth" (Instrumental)	4th Disciple	4:03
32.	"Symphony" (Instrumental)	Daez	3:23
33.	"What You Getting Into" (Instrumental)	P. Version	3:39
34.	"Another Winter" (Instrumental)	4th Disciple	3:33
35.	"Rain All Day" (Instrumental)	Daez	2:46
36.	"So Staten" (Instrumental)	P. Version; Zartical	3:43
Total length:			109:38

== Charts ==
Chart (2015)	Peak position
Australian Albums (ARIA)	80
Belgian Albums (Ultratop Flanders)	77
Belgian Albums (Ultratop Wallonia)	183
French Albums (SNEP)	133
German Albums (Offizielle Top 100)	38
Swiss Albums (Schweizer Hitparade)	12
UK R&B Albums (Official Charts)	15
US Billboard 200	57
US Independent Albums (Billboard)	4
US Top R&B/Hip-Hop Albums (Billboard)	6
US Top Rap Albums (Billboard)	4
