= Red Gone Wild: Thee Album =

Studio album by Redman
- Released: March 27, 2007
- Genre: Hip-hop
- Length: 78:56
- Labels: Gilla House; Def Squad; Def Jam
- Producers: Adam Deitch; Chris Pinset; DJ Clark Kent; E3; Erick Sermon; Omen; Pete Rock; Redman; Rockwilder; Scott Storch; Tha Chill; Timbaland; Vitamin D; Watts

Redman chronology
| How High: Soundtrack (2001) | Red Gone Wild: Thee Album (2007) | Blackout! 2 (2009) |

Singles from Red Gone Wild: Thee Album
- 1. "Put It Down" Released: March 20, 2007

Professional ratings
Aggregate scores
| Source | Rating |
|---|---|
| Metacritic | 79/100 |
Review scores
| Source | Rating |
| AllMusic | 4/5 stars |
| Entertainment Weekly | B+ |
| HipHopDX | 4/5 |
| Los Angeles Times | 4/4 stars |
| Pitchfork | 5.5/10 |
| PopMatters | 7/10 |
| RapReviews | 8/10 |
| Stylus Magazine | B |
| USA Today | 3/4 stars |

Red Gone Wild: Thee Album is the sixth studio album by rapper Redman. It was released on March 27, 2007, via his own label Gilla House Records and Def Squad Records in conjunction with Def Jam Recordings.

== Background ==
The album was delayed numerous times by Def Jam and Redman himself, with early promotion dating back to DMX's 2003 album, Grand Champ. As found in the booklet for Ghostface's The Pretty Toney Album, the album was slated to be released in the summer of 2004, but was delayed. Redman stated that he didn't want his album to get under promoted like recent Def Jam albums from Method Man, Ghostface, and The Roots, which explained the long delay for the release of Red Gone Wild. He also stated that he was waiting for the right time to drop it in hip-hop's fast changing landscape.

The first single was "Put It Down" (produced by Timbaland) with additional vocals by DJ Kool.

The album leaked onto the Internet on March 22, 2007. Following its release, the album debuted at number 13 on the U.S. Billboard 200, selling about 44,000 copies in its first week.

== Music videos ==
A music video was shot for "Da Countdown (The Saga Continues)", which was going to be the first single back in 2004.

Another music video, for "Fuck da Security/Rush da Security," can be found on the UK release as a bonus track.

Smack DVD shot a music video for "Gillahouse Check."

Official videos were made for "Put It Down" featuring a guest appearance by MTV personality Vincent "Don Vito" Margera, and "Get 'Em" featuring Gilla House artists Saukrates and Icadon.

Videos were produced for "Gimmie One" and "Freestyle Freestyle."

== Track listing ==
| No. | Title | Writer(s) | Producer(s) | Length |
|---|---|---|---|---|
| 1. | "Fire" (featuring E3) | Reggie Noble; Ellis Hall III | E3 | 2:13 |
| 2. | "Bak Inda Buildin" | Noble; Chris Pinset; Adam Deitch | Adam Deitch; Chris 'Max' Pinset | 2:26 |
| 3. | "Put It Down" | Noble; Timothy Mosley | Timbaland | 3:22 |
| 4. | "Gimmie One" | Noble; Peter Phillips; Marvin Gaye | Pete Rock | 3:29 |
| 5. | "Fuck Ur Opinion (Skit)" | | Da Mascot | 0:21 |
| 6. | "Sumtn 4 Urrbody" (featuring Blam, Runt Dog, Ready Roc, Icadon, and Saukrates) | Noble; Pinset; Deitch; Caesar Dow; S. Williams; Armon Johnson; Neil Phillips; Karl Wailoo | Adam Deitch; Chris "Max" Pinset | 3:55 |
| 7. | "How U Like Dat" (featuring Gov Mattic) | Noble; Aubrey Williams; Dana Stinson | Rockwilder | 2:15 |
| 8. | "Freestyle Freestyle" | Noble; Scott Storch | Scott Storch | 4:10 |
| 9. | "Walk in Gutta" (featuring Erick Sermon, Keith Murray, and Biz Markie) | Noble; Erick Sermon; Keith Murray; Marcel Hall; Debbie Harry; Chris Stein | Erick Sermon | 4:08 |
| 10. | "Wutchoo Gonna Do" (featuring Melanie Rutherford) | Noble; Melanie Rutherford; Willie Seastrunk; Barry White | Da Mascot | 5:55 |
| 11. | "Dis iz Brick City" (featuring Ready Roc) | Noble; Rodolfo Franklin; A. Johnson; Raeford Gerald; Reginald Spruill | DJ Clark Kent | 3:37 |
| 12. | "Rite Now" | Noble; Sermon | Erick Sermon | 4:21 |
| 13. | "Blow Treez" (featuring Ready Roc and Method Man) | Noble; Austin Garrick; Clifford Smith; A. Johnson; Bob Marley | Watts | 3:35 |
| 14. | "Pimp Nutz" | Noble; Derrick Brown | Vitamin D | 4:16 |
| 15. | "Mr. Ice Cream Man (Skit)" | | Da Mascot | 3:05 |
| 16. | "Hold Dis Blaow!" | Noble; Stinson; Dominic Owen; Kevin Scott; Christopher Wallace | Rockwilder | 3:39 |
| 17. | "Get 'Em" (featuring Saukrates and Icadon) | Noble; Vernon Johnson; Wailoo; Phillips | Tha Chill | 3:24 |
| 18. | "Merry Jane" (featuring Snoop Dogg and Nate Dogg) | Noble; Stinson; Calvin Broadus; Nathaniel Hale; Rick James | Rockwilder | 3:58 |
| 19. | "Gilla House Check" | Noble; Massimo Morante; Fabio Pignatelli; Claudio Simonetti | Da Mascot | 3:00 |
| 20. | "No Mo Soopaman Luva (Skit)" | | Da Mascot | 0:43 |
| 21. | "Soopaman Luva 6 (Part I)" (featuring E3, Hurricane G, and Melanie Rutherford) | Noble; Hall III; Rutherford; Sermon; Curtis Mayfield | Erick Sermon | 3:09 |
| 22. | "Soopaman Luva 6 1/2" (featuring Hurricane G and Melanie Rutherford) | Noble; Sidney Brown; Rutherford | Omen | 1:53 |
| 23. | "Suicide" | Noble; Pinset; Deitch; Dow | Adam Deitch; Chris "Max" Pinset | 3:29 |
| Total length: | | | | 78:56 |

United Kingdom bonus track
| No. | Title | Writer(s) | Producer(s) | Length |
|---|---|---|---|---|
| 24. | "Fuck da Security" | Noble; Adam Fenton; J.F. Smith | Adam F | 2:23 |

Leftover Tracks

- "Let's Go"
- "I C Dead People"
- "Future Thugs" (featuring Ghostface Killah, Ludacris, & Icadon)
- "Da Countdown (The Saga Continues)"

== Samples ==
"Gimmie One"

- "The Break In" by Marvin Gaye

"Walk in Gutta"

- "Heart of Glass" by Blondie
- "El Shabazz" by LL Cool J
- "Change the Beat" by Beside & Fab 5 Freddy
- "Just Rhymin' with Biz" by Big Daddy Kane

"Wutchoogonnado"

- "Midnight Groove" by Love Unlimited Orchestra

"Dis Iz Brick City"

- "You're the Joy of My Life" by Millie Jackson

"Rite Now"

- "Right Now Right Now" by Al Green

"Blow Treez"

- "The Sun Is Shining" by Bob Marley

"Mr. Ice Cream Man" (skit)"

- "The Entertainer" by Scott Joplin

"Hold Dis Blaow!"

- "Things Done Changed" by Notorious B.I.G.

"Merry Jane"

- "Mary Jane" by Rick James

"Gilla House Check"

- "Snip Snap" by Goblin

"Soopaman Luva 6 (Part I, Part 2)"

- "Give Me Your Love (Love Song)" by Curtis Mayfield

== Personnel ==
- John Bender – engineer (7)
- Blam – additional vocals (23)
- Demacio "Demo" Castellon – mixing (3)
- James Czeiner – engineer (22)
- Supa Engineer DURO – mixing (12, 13, 21)
- Tasha Ferguson – additional vocals (18)
- Conrad Golding – engineer (8)
- Gov Mattic – additional vocals (13)
- Wendisue Hall – additional vocals (1)
- Dee Jay – engineer (3)
- Mike Koch – engineer (10, 18)
- DJ Kool – additional vocals (3)
- Fabian Marascuillo – mixing (1, 4, 6–11, 14, 16, 18, 22, 23)
- Chris Pinset – engineer (23)
- Justin Rossi – engineer (1, 2, 6, 9, 11, 12, 14, 16, 19, 21–23)
- Jamey Staubb – engineer (4)
- David "Gordo" Strickland – engineer (13, 17)
- Tommy Uzzo – mixing (2, 17, 19)
