= Say (Method Man song) =

Single by Method Man

from the album 4:21... The Day After
- Released: June 9, 2006
- Recorded: 2006
- Genre: East Coast hip hop
- Length: 3:49
- Label: Def Jam
- Songwriters: Bob Marley, Clifford Smith, Erick Sermon
- Producer: Erick Sermon

Method Man singles chronology
"Still on It" (2005)	"Say" (2006)	"A-Yo" (2009)

"Say" is the first and only single from rapper Method Man's fourth studio album, 4:21... The Day After. It samples Lauryn Hill's "So Much Things to Say" from MTV's Unplugged. The song finds Method Man addressing critics and fickle fans for disrespecting him, his swag and his Wu-Tang brethren.

== Chart performance ==
Chart (2006)	Peak position
US Hot R&B/Hip-Hop Songs (Billboard)	66

== Certifications ==
Certifications and sales for "Say"
Region	Certification	Certified units/sales
New Zealand (RMNZ)	Gold	15,000^{‡}
^{‡} Sales+streaming figures based on certification alone.
