= How High (soundtrack) =

How High The Soundtrack

Soundtrack album by Various artists
- Released: December 11, 2001
- Recorded: 2000–2001
- Studio: Mirror Image Recorders (New York, NY); The Enterprise (Los Angeles, CA); Electric Lady Studios (New York, NY); 36 Chambers (Staten Island, NY); Teklab (Cincinnati, OH); Studio 306 (Toronto, ON); Chung King Studios (New York, NY); Encore Studios (Los Angeles, CA); Rockin' Reel Recordings (Long Island, NY)
- Genre: Hip hop
- Length: 1:02:52
- Label: Def Jam; UMG Soundtracks
- Producer: James Ellis (exec.); Kevin Liles (exec.); Lyor Cohen (exec.); Method Man (exec.); Redman (also exec.); Erick Sermon; Rockwilder; RZA; Allah Mathematics; Bangladesh; DJ Premier; DJ Twinz; Hi-Tek; Saukrates; Scott Storch; Swizz Beatz; Pete Rock (co.); Terry Date (co.)

Method Man & Redman chronology
Blackout! (1999)	How High The Soundtrack (2001)	Blackout! 2 (2009)

Method Man chronology
Blackout! (1999)	How High The Soundtrack (2001)	Tical 0: The Prequel (2004)

Redman chronology
Malpractice (2001)	How High The Soundtrack (2001)	Red Gone Wild: Thee Album (2007)

Singles from How High
- 1. "Part II" Released: December 4, 2001

Professional ratings
Review scores
Source	Rating
AllMusic	3/5 stars
HipHopDX	4/5 stars
The Rolling Stone Album Guide	3/5 stars

How High The Soundtrack is a soundtrack to Jesse Dylan's 2001 stoner film How High. It was released on December 11, 2001 through Def Jam Recordings and consists of hip hop music. The album contains twenty tracks featuring interpolations taken from the movie and songs performed by film stars Method Man & Redman, along with Cypress Hill, DMX, Jonell, Limp Bizkit, Ludacris, Mary J. Blige, Saukrates, Shawnna, Streetlife, and War.

The album peaked at number 38 on the Billboard 200 and at number 6 on the Top R&B/Hip-Hop Albums in the United States.

Several songs heard both in the movie and in the closing credits, such as "Hits from the Bong" and "I Wanna Get High" by Cypress Hill, "Wu Wear" by RZA, "Fire" by Ohio Players, "Jammin" by Bob Marley, "Du hast" by Rammstein, "Chin Check" by N.W.A, "Would You Mind" by Janet Jackson, "Sexy Ida" by Ike & Tina Turner, "Good Girls" by DMX, "Sweet Thing" by Mary J. Blige, "One Draw" by Rita Marley, "Flash Light" by Parliament, ''Click Click Boom" by Saliva, "The Payback" by James Brown, "B.O.B (Bombs Over Baghdad)" by Outkast, and "Slam" by Onyx, were not included in the soundtrack album.

== Track listing ==
Credits adapted from the album's liner notes.

No.	Title	Writer(s)	Producer(s)	Length
1.	"Intro" (performed by Method Man & Redman)			0:16
2.	"Part II" (performed by Method Man & Redman)	Reggie Noble; Erick Sermon; Clifford Smith; Toni Braxton; Kenneth Edmonds; Bryce Wilson	Erick Sermon	4:04
3.	"Round and Round (Remix)" (performed by Jonell & Method Man)	Shannon Showes; Tony Cottrell; I. Mills; Smith	Hi-Tek	3:50
4.	"Cisco Kid" (performed by Method Man, Redman, Cypress Hill & WAR)	Thomas Allen; Harold Ray Brown; Morris Dickerson; Leroy Jordan; Charles Miller; Lee Oskar; Howard E. Scott	Rockwilder	4:00
5.	"America's Most" (performed by Method Man & Redman)	Noble; Smith; Raymond Grant; Richard Grant	DJ Twinz	3:35
6.	"Yes Sir, Dean Cain, Sir (Skit)" (performed by Obba Babatundé, Method Man & Redman)			0:23
7.	"Let's Do It" (performed by Method Man & Redman)	Noble; Smith; Scott Storch	Scott Storch	4:35
8.	"We Don't No How 2 Act" (performed by Redman)	Noble	Redman	3:28
9.	"Who Wanna Rap" (performed by Streetlife)	Patrick Charles; Ronald Bean	Allah Mathematics	2:54
10.	"Fine Line" (performed by Saukrates)	Karl Wailoo	Saukrates	2:32
11.	"N 2 Gether Now" (performed by Limp Bizkit & Method Man)	Fred Durst; Smith; Christopher Martin	DJ Premier; Terry Date (co.)	3:56
12.	"Party Up (Up in Here)" (performed by DMX)	Earl Simmons; Kasseem Dean	Swizz Beatz	4:37
13.	"What's Your Fantasy" (performed by Ludacris & Shawnna)	Christopher Bridges; Shondrae Santiago	Shondrae	4:36
14.	"Da Rockwilder" (performed by Method Man & Redman)	Noble; Smith; Dana Stinson	Rockwilder	2:17
15.	"I Love NWA (Skit)" (performed by Redman, Justin Urich & Method Man)			0:13
16.	"Bring the Pain" (performed by Method Man)	Smith; Robert Diggs	RZA	3:06
17.	"How to Roll a Blunt" (performed by Redman)	Noble; Kenneth M. Burke; Allan W. Felder; Norma Jean Wright	Redman; Pete Rock (co.)	3:21
18.	"All I Need (Razor Sharp Mix)" (performed by Method Man & Mary J. Blige)	Smith; Diggs; Nickolas Ashford; Valerie Simpson	RZA	3:42
19.	"Big Dogs" (performed by Method Man & Redman)	Noble; Sermon; Smith	Erick Sermon; Redman (co.)	3:28
20.	"How High (Remix)" (performed by Method Man & Redman)	Noble; Sermon; Smith; Sylvester Levay; Stephan Prager	Erick Sermon	3:59
Total length:				1:02:52

Sample credits

- "Part II" contains excerpts from "You're Making Me High", written by Toni Braxton, Kenneth Edmonds, and Bryce Wilson, and performed by Toni Braxton.
- "Cisco Kid" contains a sample from "The Cisco Kid", performed by War.
- "How to Roll a Blunt" contains a sample from "Keep Rising to the Top" by Kenneth Burke.
- "All I Need (Razor Sharp Remix)" contains an interpolation of "You're All I Need to Get By", written by Nickolas Ashford and Valerie Simpson.
- "Big Dogs" contains a sample from "Tell 'Em", written by Erick Sermon.
- "How High Remix" contains a sample from "I Am Woman", performed by The Cover Girls. It also contains an interpolation of "Fly Robin Fly", written by Sylvester Levay and Stephan Prager.

== Charts ==
=== Weekly charts ===
Chart (2001)	Peak position
US Billboard 200	38
US Top R&B/Hip-Hop Albums (Billboard)	6
US Top Soundtracks (Billboard)	2

=== Year-end charts ===
Chart (2002)	Position
Canadian R&B Albums (Nielsen SoundScan)	49
Canadian Rap Albums (Nielsen SoundScan)	25
US Top R&B/Hip-Hop Albums (Billboard)	71
