= Blackout! 2 =

Studio album by Method Man & Redman
- Released: May 19, 2009
- Recorded: 2008–2009 at Redman's house
- Genre: Hip-hop
- Length: 57:48
- Labels: Wu-Tang; Gilla House; Def Squad; Def Jam
- Producers: Erick Sermon; Rockwilder; Pete Rock; Buckwild; Nasty Kutt; DJ Scratch; Havoc; Mathematics; Ty Fyffe; Bink

Method Man & Redman chronology
How High: Soundtrack (2001)	Blackout! 2 (2009)

Method Man chronology
4:21... The Day After (2006)	Blackout! 2 (2009)	Wu-Massacre (2010)

Redman chronology
Red Gone Wild: Thee Album (2007)	Blackout! 2 (2009)	Reggie (2010)

Singles from Blackout! 2
- 1. "A-Yo" Released: March 31, 2009; 2. "City Lights" Released: April 25, 2009; 3. "Mrs. International" Released: May 5, 2009

Blackout! 2 is the second studio album by American hip-hop duo Method Man & Redman. It was their first collaborative album in eight years. The album was released on May 19, 2009, under Gilla House, Wu-Tang, Def Squad, and Def Jam. It debuted at No. 7 on the U.S. Billboard 200 and at No. 64 on the French Album Charts. The album has sold 178,608 copies in the United States by December 12, 2010, according to SoundScan.

== Background ==
Blackout! 2 was announced in 2007 by Redman and was originally scheduled for release in 2008, but its release was pushed back a number of times due to numerous reasons. It was finally released on May 19, 2009. It was released on the same days as Eminem's sixth studio album Relapse and Busta Rhymes's eighth studio album Back on My B.S.. After touring on the Still High Tour with Termanology, The Alchemist, Havoc (from Mobb Deep), and Evidence, Redman and Method Man finished and set the release date for their highly anticipated sequel.

Method Man stated the reasons for the delay:

I had obligations. Doc had obligations. There were things going on with the label. Staff changes. That's what happened.

Giving his take on the delay, Redman stated:

We was out venturing, starting other careers," Red said. "We can't just depend on this rap game. We did a movie, TV show — venturing out. Now we back. We ain't left. We're coming at the right time.

== Music ==
=== Recording and production ===
The album features production from Pete Rock and Erick Sermon, as Method Man and Redman promise to satisfy patient fans. The track "A Yo" that was leaked in March is included on the album. Also the track "City Lights" featuring Bun B leaked over the internet on March 24, 2009. Wu-Tang Clan members Raekwon and Ghostface Killah appear on the album, as well as Def Squad members Erick Sermon, and Keith Murray.

Redman stated about the album's production process to MTV:

We're more advanced now than the first one, Red added. We went in, had fun. I have my own studio now, so it's more relaxed. I engineer now. It ain't no rush for time, paying the studio and engineer. It's fun. We treated [the album] like a mixtape, really. If we really got in there and sat, it'll be a beast. But it's a beast now, and we treated it like a mixtape.

== Release and promotion ==
Blackout! 2 was released 10 years after the Blackout! album, which was placed at the top of a lot of 1999's best album lists.

Entertainment Weekly explained how the two lyricists work so well together:

When Hip Hop's most playfully creative rhyme stylers throw down like two superballs in a rubber room, they're unstoppable, and make rap's most joyous ride.

Method Man and Redman have shot music videos for their singles "A Yo" and "Mrs. International". They also shot a video for the song "How Bout Dat" featuring Ready Roc and Streetlife as a video only single and was released online on September 20, 2009. There was also a fan made video for the song "Dis Is 4 All My Smokers" and was released on May 13, 2009. The song City Lights featuring Bun B was released as an only radio single. At Best Buy, both Blackout! and Blackout! 2 are sold together in a boxed set celebrating the 10th anniversary of Blackout.

=== Lights Out (Blackout 10 Year Reunion) Mixtape ===
As promotion for the new album, Method Man & Redman put a "Ten Year Reunion" mixtape. Featuring several, well-known older songs from the original Blackout! album, it also includes new songs like "Four Minutes to Lock Down" with Raekwon and Ghostface Killah, "Dangerous Mcees," etc. It also featured new singles like "City Lights" with Bun B and "A Yo" with Saukrates. The mixtape was hosted by DJ Green Lantern.

== Reception ==
=== Commercial performance ===
Blackout! 2 was released on May 19, 2009. It debuted at number 7 on the Billboard 200, at number 2 on the Top R&B/Hip-Hop Albums, at number 2 on the Top Rap Albums and digital in charted number 7 on the Digital Albums charts selling 63,000 copies its first week. The album also charted number 10 on Canadian Albums.

The album fell 11 spots to number 18 on the billboard chart in its second week with sales of 20,000 copies. In its third week the album fell 12 spots landing on number 30 selling 14,000 that week. On its fourth week the album fell 18 spots landing on number 48 with sales of 10,000 copies. The album fell 32 spots it had landed on number 70 selling 7,700 copies in its fifth week.

The album has sold 178,608 copies in the United States by December 12, 2010, according to SoundScan.

=== Critical response ===
Professional ratings
Aggregate scores
Source	Rating
Metacritic	79/100
Review scores
Source	Rating
AllMusic	4/5 stars
The A.V. Club	B+
Entertainment Weekly	B+
IGN	8.0/10
The New York Times	(favorable)
Rolling Stone	3/5 stars
Spin	3.5/5 stars
USA Today	3/4 stars
XXL	3/5 stars

Reviews of the album were generally positive. It has a score of 79 out of an overall score of 100 on Metacritic, indicating "generally favorable reviews".

AllMusic gave it a four out of five stars, stating, "With each having individual obligations all over the place, it took ten years for Method Man and Redman to record a follow-up to 1999's beloved Blackout!, but one listen and you'd think it had only been ten days. Interplay during the intro proves that none of the chemistry is lost... The original deserves the top spot, but think of this as The Godfather Part II of reckless boom-bap rap and you've got an idea of how well this Blackout! satisfies." HipHopDX gave the album a 3.5 stars out of 5, stating, "Still, Red and Meth clearly made this album for the fans, and the fans should be more or less sated. They may not be as ferocious as they once were, but very few ever have been. So with that in mind, Blackout! 2 is definitely worth a spin – and not just for nostalgia’s sake."

Vibe gave a favorable review, stating, "The middle-aged MCs have forged an album that reflects their belief that skills will always trump bells and whistles. Don’t mistake it for complacency--blame it on consistency. BO2 passes the smell test." Billboard stated, "This dynamic duo comes off as vital as it has in a decade on the highly anticipated sequel to the pair's 1999 collaborative debut, Blackout!"

IGN stated, "For the most part, Blackout! 2 is a decent rap experience, with strong beats and music, masterful emcee braggadocio and funky flow, and a playful pothead sense of humor. Nothing amazes or stands out as awful; but Meth & Red fans should be satisfied." XXL stated, "For the majority of Blackout! 2, Meth and Red touch upon the strongest staples of their past work 'Four Minutes to Lock Down', with Raekwon and Ghostface, is this album’s always reliable Wu-Tang cipher). The uninspired filler that litters this reunion’s latter portion, though, spoils the overall taste. Those with a hardcore case of the munchies for vintage Meth and Red goodness should feel satisfied. Just expect to be reminded more of past, stronger highs, rather than any lasting, in-the-moment buzz."

== Track listing ==
Blackout! 2 track listing
No.	Title	Writer(s)	Producer(s)	Length
1.	"BO2 (Intro)"	Clifford Smith, Jr.; Reginald Noble; Ronald Maurice Bean; Jack Robinson; Thomas Randolph Bell; LeRoy Bell; Casey James	Mathematics	2:34
2.	"I'm Dope Nigga"	Smith, Jr.; Noble; Kejuan Waliek Muchita	Havoc	4:11
3.	"A-Yo" (featuring Saukrates)	Smith, Jr.; Noble; Karl Amani Wailoo; Peter Phillips; Robinson; T. Bell; L. Bell; James	Pete Rock	3:44
4.	"Dangerous MCees"	Smith, Jr.; Noble; Erick Sermon	Erick Sermon	2:34
5.	"Errbody Scream" (featuring Keith Murray)	Smith, Jr.; Noble; Keith Omar Murray	Swiff D	4:27
6.	"Hey Zulu"	Smith, Jr.; Noble; Dana Stinson; Jason Paul Douglas Boyd	Rockwilder	3:12
7.	"City Lights" (featuring Bun B)	Smith, Jr.; Noble; Bernard James Freeman; William Wiik Larsen; Ronald Isley; Ernie Isley; Rudolph Bernard Isley; O'Kelly Isley Jr.; Marvin Isley; Vernon Isley; Christopher Howard Jasper; Christopher Juel Barriere	Nasty Kutt	5:03
8.	"Father's Day"	Smith, Jr.; Noble; Tyrone Gregory Fyffe; Joe Simon; King Sterling; Aseneth Peck	Ty Fyffe	2:57
9.	"Mrs. International (Skit)"	Smith, Jr.; Noble	Reggie Noble	0:57
10.	"Mrs. International" (featuring Erick Sermon)	Smith, Jr.; Noble; Sermon; Anthony Best; John Graham Hill; John Atkins	Buckwild	3:39
11.	"How Bout Dat" (featuring Ready Roc and Streetlife)	Smith, Jr.; Noble; Armon Johnson; Patrick Charles; Randy Ousley	Vinny Idol	3:59
12.	"Dis Iz 4 All My Smokers"	Smith, Jr.; Noble; George Spivey; William Harrison Withers Jr.	DJ Scratch	4:17
13.	"Lock Down (Skit)"	Smith, Jr.; Noble	Reggie Noble	1:15
14.	"Four Minutes to Lock Down" (featuring Raekwon and Ghostface Killah)	Smith, Jr.; Noble; Corey Woods; Dennis David Coles; Roosevelt Harrell III; Reese Francis Clifford III	Bink!	3:22
15.	"Neva Herd Dis B 4"	Smith, Jr.; Noble; Sermon	Erick Sermon	4:03
16.	"I Know Sumptn" (featuring Poo Bear)	Smith, Jr.; Noble; Boyd; David Manzoor	King David	3:32
17.	"A Lil Bit" (featuring Melanie Rutherford)	Smith, Jr.; Noble; Melanie Rutherford; Stinson; Chris Grayson; Khateeb Muhammad	Rockwilder; Chris N Teeb	4:11
Total length:				57:48

== Samples ==
BO2 (Intro)

- "Magic Mona" performed by Phyllis Hyman

A-Yo

- "Magic Mona" performed by Phyllis Hyman

City Lights

- "One Day" as performed by UGK

Fathers Day

- "Walking Down Lonely Street" performed by Joe Simon

Mrs. International

- "Here I Am" performed by the Blue Notes
- "Call Me" performed by Tweet

Dis is 4 All My Smokers

- "Ain't No Sunshine" as performed by Nancy Wilson

Four Minutes to Lock Down

- "Echo Park" as performed by Brooklyn Bridge

== Charts history ==
=== Album chart positions ===
Year	Album	Chart positions	
Year	Album	Billboard 200	Top R&B/Hip Hop Albums
2009	Blackout 2	7	2

=== Singles chart positions ===
Year	Song	Chart positions		
Year	Song	Billboard Hot 100	Hot R&B/Hip-Hop Songs	Hot Rap Singles
2009	"A-Yo"	-	113	-
2009	"City Lights"	-	-	-
2009	"Mrs. International"	-	-	-
