= Meth Lab Season 2: The Lithium =

2018 album by Method Man

Studio album by Method Man
- Released: December 14, 2018
- Recorded: 2017–2018
- Genre: Hip-hop
- Length: 57:07
- Label: Hanz On
- Producers: Adam McLeer; Alfredo Rivera; Chris Stylez; Daez; Dame Grease; Erick Coomes; Hanz On; Justin Truman; Leonardo "Sunday" Como; Merquiades "Melks" Lugo; Nate Gold Did-It; Patrice Newbold; Ron Browz; Tyler Coomes

Method Man chronology
The Meth Lab (2015)	Meth Lab Season 2: The Lithium (2018)	Meth Lab Season 3: The Rehab (2022)

Wu-Tang Clan solo chronology
Ear Candy (2018)	Meth Lab Season 2: The Lithium (2018)	Chamber No. 9 (2019)

Singles from Meth Lab Season 2: The Lithium
- 1. "Grand Prix" Released: August 9, 2018; 2. "Wild Cats" Released: November 1, 2018

Professional ratings
Review scores
Source	Rating
AllMusic	3.5/5 stars
HipHopDX	3.4/5
Juice	3/6
RapReviews	5/10
The Independent	2/5 stars

Meth Lab Season 2: The Lithium is the sixth studio album by American rapper and Wu-Tang Clan member Method Man. It was set to be released on November 13, 2018, but was rescheduled and released on December 14, 2018. Serving as a sequel to the rapper's previous album, The Meth Lab, it is the second album released through Hanz On Music Entertainment. The album features various guest performers including Noreaga, Redman, Sheek Louch, Snoop Dogg, and fellow Staten Islanders The Tenderloins (stars of the TV show Impractical Jokers), among others. The latter group would collaborate with Method Man in the ninth season of the show, however, Joe Gatto had left the show by this point.

== Track listing ==
- Credits adapted from iTunes.

No.	Title	Writer(s)	Producer(s)	Length
1.	"The Pilot – Intro"	Clifford Smith, Jr.	Method Man	1:19
2.	"Episode 1 – Kill Different" (featuring Hanz On and Raekwon)	Smith, Jr.; Anthony Messado; Corey Woods	Dame Grease	3:15
3.	"Episode 2 – Eastside" (featuring iNTeLL and Snoop Dogg)	Smith, Jr.; Dontae L. Hawkins; Calvin Cordozar Broadus Jr.	Hanz On; Patrice Newbold	4:24
4.	"Commercial Break" (Thotti Gotti)	Smith, Jr.		0:49
5.	"Episode 3 – Grand Prix"	Smith, Jr.	Dame Grease	2:22
6.	"Commercial Break" (Impractical Jokers Pranks)	Joseph Anthony Gatto Jr.		0:24
7.	"Episode 4 – Drunk Tunes" (featuring N.O.R.E., Joe Young, Mall G, and Jessica Lee Lamberti)	Smith, Jr.; Victor James Santiago, Jr.; Joe Young; Dwayne Jemar Jones Wilkerson; Jessica Lee Lamberti; Deanna Hunt	Dame Grease	4:33
8.	"Emergency Forecast" (Thotti Gotti Weather Report)	Smith, Jr.		0:16
9.	"Episode 5 – Wild Cats" (featuring Redman, Streetlife, and Hanz On)	Smith, Jr.; Reginald Noble; Messado	Lordz of Brooklyn	4:11
10.	"Episode 6 – The Lab" (featuring SpankJusBizness)	Smith, Jr.; Michael JB Porta	Nate Gold Did-It	2:22
11.	"Episode 7 – Bridge Boys" (featuring Rock and Kash Verrazono)	Smith, Jr.; Jahmal Bush	Ron Browz	2:53
12.	"Episode 8 – Back Blockz" (featuring Freak, Cardi Express, and Youngin)	Smith, Jr.	Dame Grease	4:17
13.	"Episode 9 – Ronin's" (featuring Hanz On, Cappadonna, and Masta Killa)	Smith, Jr.; Messado; Darryl Hill; Jamel Irief	Leonardo "Sunday" Como	3:18
14.	"Commercial Break" (Impractical Jokers "Torture")	Gatto; Brian Quinn; Salvatore Edward Anthony Vulcano		0:55
15.	"Episode 10 – Two More Mins"	Smith, Jr.	P. Version	2:16
16.	"Commercial Break" (Thotti Gotti "Pussy on Soundcloud")	Smith, Jr.		0:41
17.	"Episode 11 – SI vs. Everybody" (featuring Apocalipps and Iron Mic)	Smith, Jr.; Malcolm Penn	Alfredo Rivera; Daez	4:17
18.	"Episode 12 – Lithium" (featuring Sheek Louch and Hanz On)	Smith, Jr.; Sean Divine Jacobs; Messado	Daez	3:19
19.	"Episode 13 – P.L.O. (Remix)" (featuring Hanz On, Hue Hef, Streetlife, and Lounge Lo)	Smith, Jr.; Messado; Charles	Merquiades "Melks" Lugo	4:15
20.	"Episode 14 – Killing the Game" (featuring Pretty Blanco)	Smith, Jr.; Tyler Krute	Hanz On; Erick Coomes; Justin Truman; Tyler Coomes	2:51
21.	"Episode 15 – Yo" (featuring Hanz On, Streetlife and Apocalipps)	Smith, Jr.; Messado; Charles; Penn	Chris Stylez	3:57
22.	"Outro"	Smith, Jr.		0:12
Total length:				57:07

== Chart history ==
Chart (2018)	Peak position
US Digital Albums (Billboard)	21
US Independent Albums (Billboard)	20
