= Meth Lab Season 3: The Rehab =

Studio album by Method Man
- Released: May 6, 2022
- Recorded: 2021–2022
- Genre: Hip-hop
- Length: 33:49
- Labels: HOME; ONErpm
- Producers: Adam McLeer; Daniel C. Wells; Darnell Norman; Erick Sermon; Joshua D. Zimmerman; Justin Trugman; P. Version; Rockwilder

Method Man chronology
Meth Lab Season 2: The Lithium (2018)	Meth Lab Season 3: The Rehab (2022)

Singles from Meth Lab Season 3: The Rehab
- 1. "Last 2 Minutes" Released: October 28, 2021; 2. "Butterfly Effect" Released: March 10, 2022; 3. "Live from the Meth Lab" Released: May 5, 2022

Professional ratings
Review scores
Source	Rating
RapReviews	7.5/10

Meth Lab Season 3: The Rehab is the seventh studio album by American rapper and Wu-Tang Clan member Method Man. It was released on May 6, 2022, through Hanz On Music Entertainment (HOME) & ONErpm. It features guest appearances by fellow Wu-Tang Clan member Cappadonna, Jadakiss, KRS-One, and Redman. The album was produced by Erick Sermon, Rockwilder, Adam McLeer, Daniel C. Lewis, Darnell Norman, Joshua D. Zimmerman, Justin Trugman, and P. Version.

== Background ==
On October 28, 2021, Method Man released the debut single of the album titled “Last 2 Minutes” which features Iron Mic. On January 25, 2022, he released a video for the single.

On March 10, 2022, he released the second single of the album titled “Butterfly Effect” which features RJ Payne.

On April 8, 2022, he announced that his next album Meth Lab Season 3: The Rehab would be released on May 6, 2022. The same day, he released the third single of the album titled “Live from the Meth Lab” which features notable guest appearances by JoJo Pellegrino, KRS-One and long-time collaborator Redman.

== Track listing ==
- Credits adapted from Tidal.

Meth Lab Season 3: The Rehab track listing
No.	Title	Writer(s)	Producer(s)	Length
1.	"Stop Crying" (featuring Cappadonna and Elaine Kristal)	Clifford Smith, Jr.; Darryl Hill; Elaine Kristal Colon	P. Version	2:38
2.	"Butterfly Effect" (featuring RJ Payne)	Smith, Jr.; Robert J. Evans; Pascal Zumaque	P. Version	2:58
3.	"Black Ops" (featuring Hanz On)	Smith, Jr.; Anthony Messado	P. Version	2:49
4.	"Guillotine"	Smith, Jr.; Dana Stinson	Rockwilder	2:13
5.	"Live from the Meth Lab" (featuring Redman, KRS-One and JoJo Pellegrino)	Smith, Jr.; Reginald Noble; Lawrence Parker	Adam McLeer	3:36
6.	"Switch Sides" (featuring Jadakiss, Eddy I and 5th PXWER)	Smith, Jr.; Jason Terrance Phillips; Eddy Infante; Sha Smith	P. Version	2:55
7.	"Act Up" (featuring 5th PXWER)	Smith, Jr.; Smith	Erick Sermon	2:41
8.	"Training Day" (featuring Cortez)	Smith, Jr.	Darnell Norman; Daniel C. Wells	3:05
9.	"King of New York" (featuring Carlton Fisk and Chunk Bizza)	Smith, Jr.; George Cooney	P. Version	2:28
10.	"Find God" (featuring iNTeLL and Iron Mic)	Smith, Jr.; Dontae L. Hawkins	Adam McLeer	3:45
11.	"Last 2 Minutes" (featuring Iron Mic)	Smith, Jr.	Daniel C. Wells; Joshua D. Zimmerman	2:09
12.	"K.A.S.E." (featuring Hanz On and Carlton Fisk)	Smith, Jr.; Messado; Cooney	Justin Trugman	2:33
Total length:				33:49
