= Put It Down (Redman song) =

Single by Redman featuring DJ Kool

from the album Red Gone Wild: Thee Album
- Released: March 20, 2007
- Genre: Hip-hop
- Length: 3:22
- Label: Def Jam Recordings
- Songwriters: Redman; Timbaland
- Producer: Timbaland

Redman singles chronology
"Yeah Yeah U Know It" (2003)	"Put It Down" (2007)	"A-Yo" (2009)

DJ Kool singles chronology
"Let's Get Dirty (I Can't Get in da Club)" (2003)	"Put It Down" (2007)

"Put it Down" is the first single from Redman's sixth album, Red Gone Wild: Thee Album. Producer Timbaland produced and created the upbeat track used in "Put it Down". This song is unlike the traditional Redman song, in which the beat is slow and funky. "Put it Down" differs because it is completely different, being upbeat, and bass-pounding. The music video features Timbaland, comedian Donnell Rawlings, and television personality Vincent "Don Vito" Margera. "Put it Down" also features additional vocals by DJ Kool.

The song was written by Redman and Timbaland

The video premiered on March 29, 2007 on Yahoo music.

== Background ==
Redman explained that he chose "Put It Down" not because of Timbaland being the hot producer, but it was the only track that stood out to him at the time, calling it the "Time 4 Sum Aksion" of 2007.

== Critical reception ==
Arthur Gailes of RapReviews praised "Put It Down" as "a radio-ready banger that doesn't sacrifice any of Redman's considerable talent or credibility." Ian Cohen of Stylus Magazine felt it was "an ill-considered club banger that just idles". Andrew Kahn of The Michigan Daily saw it as the record's "standout track", saying: "Timbo's not at his best, but the constant kick-drums and synths drive the uptempo beat, which Redman rides with ease." Pitchfork contributor Tom Breihan called it one of the album's "euphorically propulsive standout tracks", but critiqued that "none of Red's lines quite find their mark."

== Single track list ==
=== A-Side ===
1. Put It Down (Dirty)
2. Put It Down (Clean)

=== B-Side ===
1. Gimme One (Clean)
2. Gimme One (Dirty)

== Charts ==
Chart (2007)	Peak position
U.S. Billboard Bubbling Under Hot 100 Singles	2
US Hot R&B/Hip-Hop Songs (Billboard)	92
