= 4:21... The Day After =

4:21 ...The Day After

Studio album by Method Man
- Released: August 29, 2006
- Genres: East Coast hip-hop; hardcore hip-hop
- Length: 62:05
- Label: Def Jam
- Producers: Erick Sermon; RZA; Beretta 9; Havoc; Kwamé; Mathematics; Mr. Porter; Scott Storch; the Chairman of the Boards; Versatile

Method Man chronology
Tical 0: The Prequel (2004)	4:21 ...The Day After (2006)	Blackout! 2 (2009)

Wu-Tang Clan solo chronology
Made in Brooklyn (2006)	4:21... The Day After (2006)	More Fish (2006)

Singles from 4:21... The Day After
- 1. "Say" Released: June 9, 2006

Professional ratings
Aggregate scores
Source	Rating
Metacritic	65/100
Review scores
Source	Rating
AllMusic	3/5 stars
Entertainment Weekly	B
HipHopDX	4/5
Now	3/5 stars
PopMatters	7/10
RapReviews	8/10
Slant Magazine	3.5/5 stars
Stylus Magazine	B−
Vibe	3.5/5 stars
XXL	3/5 stars

4:21 ...The Day After is the fourth solo album by the American rapper and Wu-Tang Clan member Method Man. It was released on August 29, 2006, by Def Jam Recordings, to mostly positive reviews. The album has guest appearances by Fat Joe, Styles P, Redman and various Wu-Tang Clan members. It was produced by RZA, Havoc, Kwamé, Erick Sermon and Scott Storch, among others. U-God appears in the song "The Glide" but is not credited.

== Background ==
In regard to RZA's contributions to the album, Method Man explained, "RZA was the first name I said when I spoke to Jay-Z, when he signed off on the album budget. I’m happy with the outcome, but I think RZA could have had a little bit more input, but he was busy at the time." "This is just more RZA on production, shit like that. But some of the shit I couldn't do, because some of these producers were screaming out these niggas want a $100,000 for a track. Fuck that! Kiss my ass. I'm not paying nobody a $100,000 for shit, unless I can live in that mothafucka."

Method Man explained the album's title: "The national weed smoking day is 4/20, so I named my album 4/21 the day after. Because after that day, you have this moment of clarity when you’re not high and you see things clearly."

== Commercial performance ==
4:21... The Day After debuted at number 8 on the US Billboard 200 chart, selling 62,000 copies in its first week. It was Method Man's fifth consecutive Top 10 album in the United States, counting his previous solo albums and the collaboration Blackout! with Redman.

== Track listing ==
4:21… The Day After track listing
No.	Title	Writer(s)	Producer(s)	Length
1.	"Intro"	Clifford Smith, Jr.; Robert Fitzgerald Diggs	RZA	2:10
2.	"Is It Me"	Smith, Jr.; Scott Spencer Storch	Scott Storch	3:44
3.	"Problem"	Smith, Jr.; Erick Sermon; Ivan Woods	Erick Sermon	3:30
4.	"Somebody Done Fucked Up"	Smith, Jr.; Kejuan Waliek Muchita	Havoc	3:18
5.	"Shaolin Soldier (skit)"	Smith, Jr.		0:21
6.	"Fall Out"	Smith, Jr.; Kwamé Holland	Kwamé	3:24
7.	"Dirty Mef" (featuring Ol' Dirty Bastard)	Smith, Jr.; Russell Tyrone Jones; Sermon; Ronald Maurice Bean	Erick Sermon; Mathematics	2:59
8.	"4:20" (featuring Streetlife and Carlton Fisk)	Smith, Jr.; Patrick Charles; Carlton Fisk; Diggs	Kinetic 9; RZA	4:34
9.	"Let's Ride" (featuring Ginuwine)	Smith, Jr.; Elgin Baylor Lumpkin; Denaun Porter; Aldrin Davis	Mr. Porter	3:10
10.	"The Glide" (featuring Raekwon, U-God, and La the Darkman)	Smith, Jr.; Corey Woods; Lason Jackson; Diggs	RZA	3:05
11.	"Kids (skit)"	Smith, Jr.		0:47
12.	"Got to Have It"	Smith, Jr.; Sermon; Ronald Isley; Rudolph Isley; Ernest Isley; Marvin Isley; O'Kelly Isley Jr.; Christopher Howard Jasper; Alloy Hume; Howard Lilly	Erick Sermon	4:13
13.	"Say"	Smith, Jr.; Sermon; Robert Nesta Marley	Erick Sermon	3:49
14.	"Ya'Meen" (featuring Fat Joe and Styles P)	Smith, Jr.; Joseph Antonio Cartagena; David Styles; Daniel Klein; Johannes Jørgensen	Deekay	4:21
15.	"Konichiwa Bitches"	Smith, Jr.; Diggs	RZA	2:59
16.	"Everything" (featuring Inspectah Deck and Streetlife)	Smith, Jr.; Jason Richard Hunter; Charles; Bean	Mathematics	3:39
17.	"Walk On" (featuring Redman)	Smith, Jr.; Reginald Noble; Andrew Roettger; Burt Freeman Bacharach; Harold Lane David	Versatile; RZA; Erick Sermon	2:49
18.	"Pimpin' (skit)"	Smith, Jr.		0:39
19.	"Presidential MC" (featuring Raekwon and RZA)	Smith, Jr.; C. Woods; Diggs	RZA	4:30
20.	"4 Ever" (featuring Megan Rochell)	Smith, Jr.; Holland; David Lewis; Jonathan Lewis; Wayne Lewis	Kwamé	4:04
Total length:				62:05

United Kingdom bonus track
No.	Title	Writer(s)	Producer(s)	Length
21.	"O.D."	Smith, Jr.; Holland	Kwamé	3:32
Total length:				65:37

== Personnel ==
- Chris Athens – mastering
- Rob Caiaffa – marketing
- Mike Chav – engineer, mixing
- Carol Corless – package production
- Armon Davis – keyboards
- Mike Dupus – engineer, mixing
- James Ellis – management
- R. "Skane" Ford – A&R
- Havoc – producer
- Terese Joseph – A&R assistance
- Gimel Keaton – engineer, mixing
- Kinetic – producer
- Lil O – engineer
- Tai Linzie – art co-ordinator, photo co-ordination
- Glen Marchese – mixing
- Patrick McGee – engineer

- Method Man – executive producer
- Ayinde "Tike" Olubayo – engineer
- Jose "Choco" Reynoso – engineer, mixing
- Megan Rochell – performer
- Justin Rossi – engineer
- RZA – arranger, vocals, producer, executive producer, mixing
- Ken Schles – photography
- Erick Sermon – arranger, producer, executive producer
- Scott Storch – producer
- Conrad "Con Da Don" Golding – engineer
- Aaron "Franchise" Fishbein – electric guitar and bass guitar
- David "Gordo" Strickland – engineer
- Supa Engineer "Dura" – mixing
- Dan Tobiason – mixing assistant
- Andrew "Versatile" Roettger – producer
- Alli Truch – creative director
- Erni Vales – illustrations
- Dawud West – art direction, design

== Charts ==
Chart performance
Chart (2006)	Peak position
Austrian Albums (Ö3 Austria)	68
Belgian Albums (Ultratop Flanders)	98
Canadian Albums (Nielsen SoundScan)	14
Dutch Albums (Album Top 100)	74
French Albums (SNEP)	35
German Albums (Offizielle Top 100)	47
Swiss Albums (Schweizer Hitparade)	8
UK Albums (Official Charts)	80
UK R&B Albums (Official Charts)	7
US Billboard 200	8
US Indie Store Album Sales (Billboard)	6
US Top R&B/Hip-Hop Albums (Billboard)	4
