= Hanz On =

American rapper

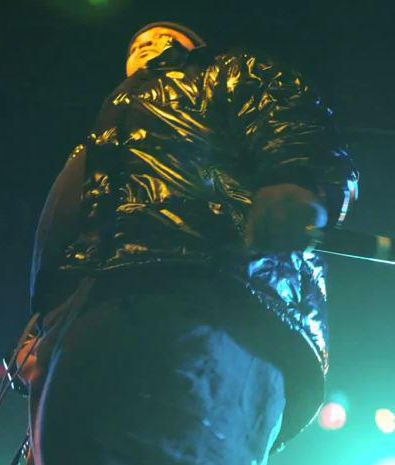

Background information
- Also known as: Hannibal The Great
- Born: Anthony Messado; July 24, 1974 (age 52)
- Origin: Staten Island, New York City, U.S.
- Genres: East Coast hip-hop
- Years active: 2007–present
- Label: Hanz On Music
- Website: www.hanzonmusic.com

Anthony Messado (born July 24, 1974), better known by the stage name Hanz On or Hannibal The Great, is an American rapper and an affiliate of the Wu-Tang Clan. He released his solo debut, Out Of Chef's Kitchen in 2010, and has since co-founded a record label called Hanz On Music. He is closely tied to another Wu-Tang Clan affiliate named Carlton Fisk.

== Music career ==
=== Out Of Chef's Kitchen ===
Hanz On released his debut album, Out Of Chef's Kitchen, after signing to Ice Water Inc. in 2010. He had previously been a part of Ice Water and featured on their debut crew and compilation albums. The solo album contained verses from Raekwon, Inspectah Deck, and Busta Rhymes among others.

In August 2009, Hanz attained notoriety after an incident during that year's Rock The Bells festival. Hanz punched rapper Joe Budden in the face because of a feud that Budden had with Raekwon and other members of the Wu-Tang Clan.

=== Hanz On Music, Back to Sicily Mixtape, and Method Man Presents: Hannibal The Great ===
In 2012, Hanz On launched record label Hanz On Music, formally leaving Ice Water Inc. In late 2012 it was announced that the new label's first release would be the "Back to Sicily Mixtape" hosted by DJ Kay Slay. Back To Sicily featured appearances from Method Man and Inspectah Deck. A music video for lead single We Did It was produced in September 2012. Hanz On's second solo LP titled Method Man Presents: Hannibal The Great was released in 2013 and featured Method Man, Ghostface Killah, and Inspectah Deck.

== Legal issues ==
On June 20, 1994, Hanz On was sentenced to 3 years in prison after third-degree criminal possession of weapon substance. On January 28, 1998, Hanz On was released from prison.

On February 16, 1999, Hanz On was sentenced to 3 years in prison after third-degree criminal sale control substance. On October 24, 2002, Hanz On was released from prison.

On May 1, 2003, Hanz On was sentenced to 3 years in prison after third-degree attempted criminal sale control substance. On June 23, 2006, Hanz On was released from prison.

== Discography ==
Studio albums

- 2010: Out Of Chef's Kitchen
- 2013: Method Man Presents: Hannibal The Great
- 2017: Barca

Mixtapes

- 2012: Back to Sicily Mixtape

Collaborations

- 2007: Raekwon's "Ice Water - Polluted Water"
- 2009: Raekwon "BabyGrande Recordings"
