= Blackout! (Method Man & Redman album) =

Studio album by Method Man & Redman
- Released: September 28, 1999
- Genre: Hip-hop
- Length: 58:36
- Labels: Def Squad; Def Jam
- Producers: DJ Scratch; Gov Mattic; Mathematics; Reggie Noble; Rockwilder; RZA; Erick Sermon

Method Man & Redman chronology
Blackout! (1999)	How High: Soundtrack (2001)

Method Man chronology
Tical 2000: Judgement Day (1998)	Blackout! (1999)	How High: Soundtrack (2001)

Redman chronology
Doc's da Name 2000 (1998)	Blackout! (1999)	Malpractice (2001)

Singles from Blackout!
- 1. "Tear It Off" Released: August 17, 1999; 2. "Da Rockwilder" Released: October 26, 1999; 3. "Y.O.U." Released: January 18, 2000

Blackout! is the debut studio album by American hip hop duo Method Man & Redman. It is the first full-length release by Method Man and Redman after many collaborations. The album continued a string of highly successful Def Jam releases in the late 1990s. The album debuted at number three on the US Billboard 200 with first week sales of 254,000 copies and served as a bit of a precursor to the 2001 major studio film How High. Both rappers enjoyed perhaps the height of their popularity as a tandem after the success of the album and its three charted singles. The singles were also popular videos which were mainstays on MTV and BET. The sequel to the album, Blackout! 2, was released on May 19, 2009.

== Background ==
Originally the name of the album was to be Amerikaz Most Blunted and was advertised as that for months before the release, but they changed it to the more commercially acceptable Blackout!. The CD version of the album features three previously released bonus tracks; "Well All Rite Cha" also appeared on Redman's solo album, Doc's Da Name 2000, "Big Dogz" from Method Man's Tical 2000: Judgement Day and 1995's critically acclaimed single "How High".

The most popular of these previous collaborations was on the song "How High" from the soundtrack to The Show. The album's three singles, "Y.O.U.", "Da Rockwilder" and "Tear It Off", spearheaded the highly hyped release to go platinum on January 6, 2000, more than three months after the album's release. The album has also been certified platinum in Canada (100,000 copies). The album has sold 1,575,000 copies to date. .

== Critical reception ==
Professional ratings
Review scores
Source	Rating
AllMusic	4/5 stars
Entertainment Weekly	A−
Los Angeles Times	2.5/4 stars
Rolling Stone	3/5 stars
The Rolling Stone Album Guide	4/5 stars
USA Today	3/4 stars

Blackout! received mostly positive reviews from music critics. AllMusic's John Bush commended the album for its "tight and inventive" rhymes and "spare, hard-hitting" production. Matt Diehl of Entertainment Weekly called it a "historic collaboration". Kevin Powell of Rolling Stone thought Blackout! was a "tight-as-drum album in an era of half-assed efforts". Steve Jones of USA Today praised the duo for their "complex, animated lyrics", which he believed fit well with "throbbing, incessant beats".

Several reviews were less favorable. Dave Tompkins of The Wire commended the duo's vocal performance along with the production, but thought some of the tracks that reused hooks by A Tribe Called Quest, Cypress Hill, and Beastie Boys sounded lackluster. Soren Baker, in a review for Los Angeles Times, also wrote that the album sounds lackluster. He criticized both the production for being "too spare and simple for rappers of this caliber" and the lyrics for lacking meaningful content.

In 2000, The Source magazine placed Blackout! in its list of top 10 albums of 1999, adding that the album features a diverse production and highlighting metaphorical focus of the lyrics.

== Commercial performance ==
Blackout debuted at number three on the US Billboard 200 chart, selling 254,000 copies in its first week. On January 6, 2000, the album was certified platinum by the Recording Industry Association of America (RIAA) for sales of over a million copies. As of October 2009, the album has 1,575,000 copies in the United States.

== Live performances ==
Method Man & Redman appeared on the second leg of the second edition to the Family Values Tour in 1999, appearing alongside other rap rock and alternative acts at the time including, Limp Bizkit, Filter, Primus, Sevendust and Staind. Among the live performances of songs from this album was a live performance of "Da Rockwilder" by both rappers during boxer Roy Jones Jr.'s entrance for his undisputed light heavyweight championship fight against David Telesco at Radio City Music Hall on January 15, 2000, which was the first boxing match hosted at the venue.

== Track listing ==
No.	Title	Writer(s)	Producer	Length
1.	"A Special Joint" (Intro)	Clifford Smith, Jr.; Reginald Noble	Reggie Noble	1:28
2.	"Blackout"	Smith, Jr.; Noble; Erick Sermon	Erick Sermon	3:39
3.	"Mi Casa"	Smith, Jr.; Noble; Sermon	Erick Sermon	2:57
4.	"Y.O.U."	Smith, Jr.; Noble; Sermon	Erick Sermon	3:55
5.	"4 Seasons" (featuring LL Cool J and Ja Rule)	Smith, Jr.; Noble; Sermon; James Todd Smith; Jeffrey Bruce Atkins, Sr.	Erick Sermon	4:04
6.	"Cereal Killer" (featuring Blue Raspberry)	Smith, Jr.; Noble; Robert Fitzgerald Diggs	RZA	3:57
7.	"Da Rockwilder"	Smith, Jr.; Noble; Dana Stinson	Rockwilder	2:19
8.	"Tear It Off"	Smith, Jr.; Noble; Sermon	Erick Sermon	4:10
9.	"Where We At" (Skit)	Smith, Jr.; Noble	Reggie Noble	1:53
10.	"1, 2, 1, 2"	Smith, Jr.; Noble; George Spivey	DJ Scratch	4:30
11.	"Maaad Crew"	Smith, Jr; Noble; Sermon	Erick Sermon	4:17
12.	"Run 4 Cover" (featuring Ghostface Killah and Street Life)	Smith, Jr.; Noble; Diggs; Dennis David Coles; Patrick Charles	RZA	3:49
13.	"The ?"	Smith, Jr.; Noble	Reggie Noble	4:50
14.	"Dat's Dat Shit" (featuring Mally G and Young Zee)	Smith, Jr.; Noble; Dewayne Battle; Ronald Maurice Bean; Jamal Phillips	Mathematics	4:02
15.	"Cheka"	Smith, Jr.; Noble; Aubrey Williams	Gov Mattic; Reggie Noble	2:49
16.	"Fire Ina Hole"	Smith, Jr.; Noble; Bean	Mathematics	4:21
Total length:				58:36

Bonus tracks
No.	Title	Writer(s)	Producer(s)	Length
17.	"Well All Rite Cha" (from the album Doc's Da Name 2000)	Noble; Sermon; Smith, Jr.	Erick Sermon; Reggie Noble	4:11
18.	"Big Dogs" (from the album Tical 2000: Judgement Day)	Smith, Jr.; Noble; Sermon	Erick Sermon; Reggie Noble	3:28
19.	"How High *" (* Although listed as "How High (Remix)" on all pressings, the actual version included is the original as featured on Russell Simmons Presents: The Show)	Noble; Sermon; Smith, Jr.	Erick Sermon	4:33
Total length:				1:09:14

== Charts ==
=== Weekly charts ===
Chart (1999)	Peak position
Australian Albums (ARIA)	92
Canadian Albums (Billboard)	3
Canadian R&B Albums (Nielsen SoundScan)	2
Dutch Albums (Album Top 100)	36
French Albums (SNEP)	33
German Albums (Offizielle Top 100)	36
UK Albums (Official Charts)	45
US Billboard 200	3
US Top R&B/Hip-Hop Albums (Billboard)	1

=== Year-end charts ===
Chart (1999)	Position
US Billboard 200	123
US Top R&B/Hip-Hop Albums (Billboard)	47
Chart (2000)	Position
US Billboard 200	172
US Top R&B/Hip-Hop Albums (Billboard)	70

=== Singles ===
Year	Single	Peak chart positions	
Year	Single	US Hot R&B/Hip-Hop Singles & Tracks	US Hot Rap Singles
1999	"Tear It Off"	52	16
1999	"Y.O.U."	69	18
1999	"Da Rockwilder"	51	14
"—" denotes releases that did not chart.

== Certifications ==
Region	Certification	Certified units/sales
Canada (Music Canada)	Platinum	100,000^{^}
United Kingdom (BPI)	Gold	100,000^{^}
United States (RIAA)	Platinum	1,000,000^{^}
^{^} Shipments figures based on certification alone.

== See also ==
- List of number-one R&B albums of 1999 (U.S.)
