= Wu-Tang Clan discography =

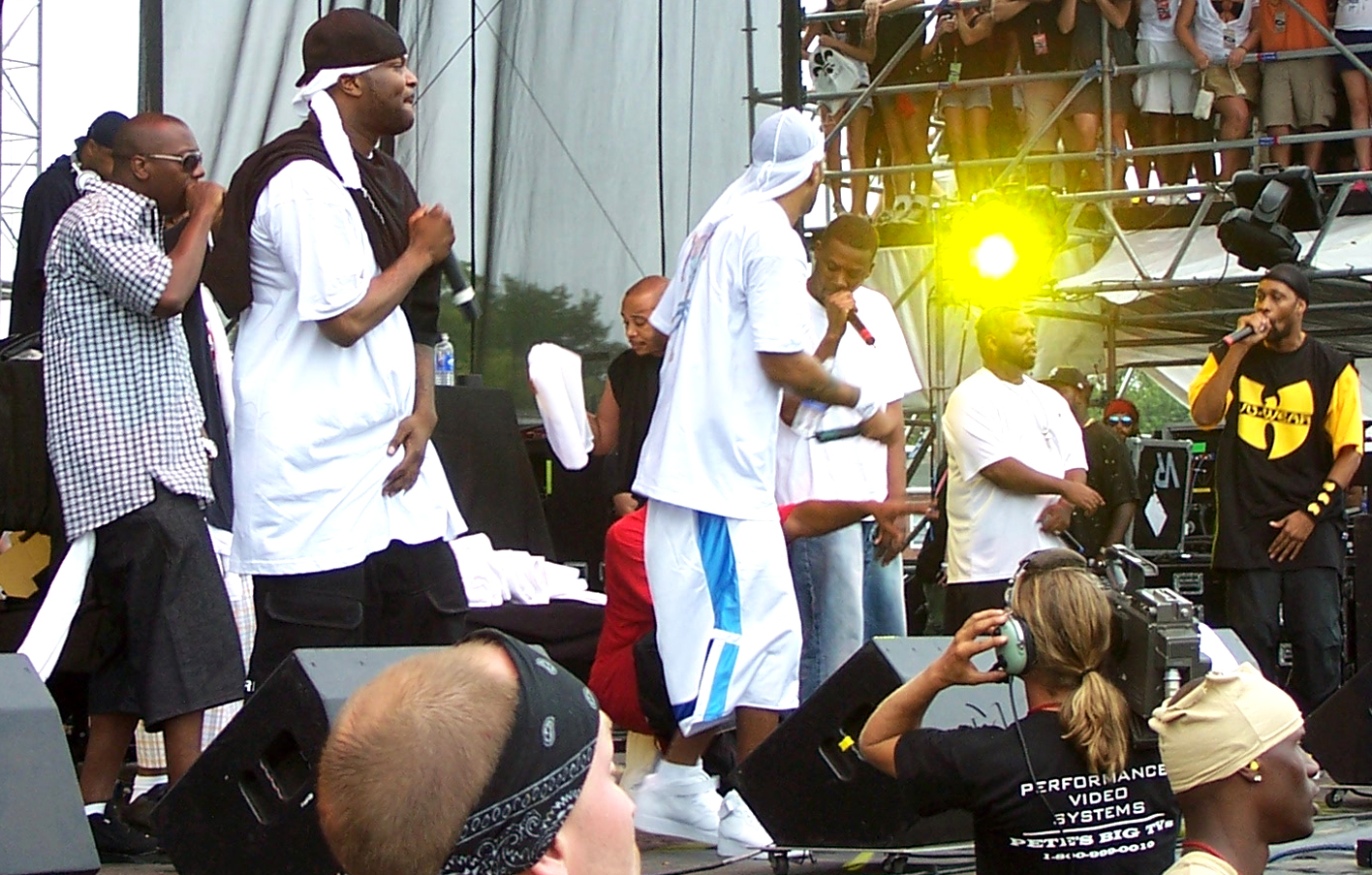
- Members of the Wu-Tang Clan and their affiliates performing at the Virgin Festival in Baltimore.
- Studio albums: 7
- Extended plays: 1
- Singles: 16
- Compilations: 20
- Other appearances: 12

The Wu-Tang Clan is a New York City-based hip-hop musical group, consisting of ten American rappers: RZA, GZA, Method Man, Raekwon, Ghostface Killah, Inspectah Deck, U-God, Masta Killa, Cappadonna, and the late Ol' Dirty Bastard.

Widely regarded as one of the most influential groups in hip-hop history, they achieved commercial and critical success with their 1993 debut album, Enter the Wu-Tang (36 Chambers). Beyond their collective work, the members launched successful solo careers and established the Wu-Tang Killa Bees, an extended network of affiliated rappers, producers, and record labels.

== Albums ==
=== Studio albums ===
List of studio albums, with selected chart positions, sales figures and certifications
Title	Album details	Peak chart positions										Sales figures	Certifications
Title	Album details	US	US R&B	AUS	AUT	CAN	FRA	GER	NLD	SWI	UK	Sales figures	Certifications
Enter the Wu-Tang (36 Chambers)	Released: November 9, 1993; Label: Loud, RCA; Formats: CD, LP, cassette	41	8	—	—	—	—	—	—	57	83		RIAA: 4× Platinum; ARIA: Platinum; BPI: Platinum; MC: 3× Platinum
Wu-Tang Forever	Released: June 3, 1997; Label: Loud, RCA; Formats: CD, LP, cassette	1	1	8	17	1	8	8	9	11	1	US: 2,000,000	RIAA: 4× Platinum; BPI: Gold; MC: 2× Platinum
The W	Released: November 21, 2000; Label: Loud, Columbia; Formats: CD, LP, cassette	5	1	51	13	9	13	11	15	24	19	WW: 1,300,000	RIAA: Platinum; BPI: Gold; BVMI: Gold; MC: Gold
Iron Flag	Released: December 18, 2001; Label: Loud, Columbia; Formats: CD, LP, cassette	32	6	46	36	—	61	44	57	39	77	US: 687,000	RIAA: Gold
8 Diagrams	Released: December 11, 2007; Label: SRC, Universal Motown; Formats: CD, LP	25	9	74	—	—	84	79	95	19	114	US: 202,000	
A Better Tomorrow	Released: December 2, 2014; Label: Warner Bros.; Formats: CD, digital download	29	3	49	51	24	104	64	—	21	74	US: 60,000	
Once Upon a Time in Shaolin	Released: November 25, 2015; Label: EZCLZIV Scluzay; Formats: CD	—	—	—	—	—	—	—	—	—	—		

=== EPs ===
Title	EP details
Wu-Tang: Of Mics and Men	Released: May 17, 2019; Label: Mass Appeal/36 Chambers; Format: Digital

=== Compilation albums ===
Compilation details	Peak chart positions					Certifications
Compilation details	US	US R&B	US Ind.	FRA	UK	Certifications
The Swarm (as Wu-Tang Killa Bees): Released: July 21, 1998; Label: Priority; Formats: CD, LP, Cassette	4	3	—	—	81	RIAA: Gold
Wu-Chronicles: Released: March 23, 1999; Label: Wu-Tang Records; Formats: CD, LP, Cassette	25	16	—	—	—	
Wu-Chronicles, Chapter 2: Released: July 3, 2001; Label: Priority Records; Formats: CD, LP, Cassette	72	30	—	—	—	
The Sting (as Wu-Tang Killa Bees): Released: March 12, 2002; Label: Koch Entertainment; Formats: CD, LP, Cassette	46	9	1	—	197	
Disciples of the 36 Chambers: Chapter 1: Released: September 28, 2004; Label: Sanctuary; Formats: CD, DVD	82	36	—	137	—	
Legend of the Wu-Tang: Wu-Tang Clan's Greatest Hits: Released: October 26, 2004; Label: BMG Heritage; Format: CD, LP	72	28	—	—	162	BPI: Gold
Wu-Tang Meets the Indie Culture: Released: October 18, 2005; Label: Babygrande; Formats: CD	190	68	17	—	—	
Mathematics Presents Wu-Tang Clan & Friends Unreleased (with Mathematics): Released: February 6, 2007; Label: Nature Sounds; Formats: CD	—	—	—	—	—	
Wu-Box - The Cream Of The Clan (Wu-Tang Clan Family Album): Released: August 28, 2007; Label: Cleopatra	—	—	—	—	—	
Return of the Swarm: Released: July 2, 2007; Label: 101 Distribution; Formats: CD	—	—	—	—	—	
Return of the Swarm, Vol. 4: Released: August 13, 2007; Label: CMP Entertainment; Formats: CD	—	—	—	—	—	
Wu XM Radio: Released: August 20, 2007; Label: Think Differently; Formats: CD	—	—	—	—	—	
Lost Anthology: Released: October 27, 2007; Label: Think Differently; Formats: CD	—	—	—	—	—	
Return of the Swarm, Vol. 5: Released: February 9, 2008; Label: 101 Distribution; Formats: CD	—	—	—	—	—	
Soundtracks from the Shaolin Temple (as Wu-Tang Killa Bees): Released: October 7, 2008; Label: Wanderluxe; Formats: CD	—	—	—	—	—	
Wu: The Story of the Wu-Tang Clan: Released: November 18, 2008; Label: Loud, Legacy; Formats: CD	—	32	—	—	—	
Killa Bees Attack: Released: November 24, 2008; Label: J Love Enterprises; Formats: CD	—	—	—	—	—	
Chamber Music (as Wu-Tang): Released: June 30, 2009; Label: E1 Music; Formats: CD	49	13	3	196	—	
Wu-Tang Meets the Indie Culture Vol. 2: Enter the Dubstep: Released: November 10, 2009; Label: ihiphop; Formats: CD	—	87	—	—	—	
Legendary Weapons (as Wu-Tang): Released: July 26, 2011; Label: E1 Music; Formats: digital download, CD	41	10	6	—	151	
The Essential Wu-Tang Clan: Released: October 29, 2013; Label: Loud, Legacy; Formats: digital download, CD	—	—	—	—	—	
The Saga Continues (as Wu-Tang): Released: October 13, 2017; Label: eOne; Formats: digital download, CD, vinyl	15	—	—	69	42	
Black Samson, the Bastard Swordsman (as Wu-Tang): Released: April 12, 2025; Label: Self-released; Formats: streaming, digital download, CD, vinyl	—	—	—	—	—	
"—" denotes releases that did not chart.

== Singles ==
List of singles, with selected chart positions and certifications, showing year released and album name
Title	Year	Peak chart positions									Certifications	Album
Title	Year	US	US R&B	US Rap	AUS	AUT	BEL (FL)	FRA	SWI	UK	Certifications	Album
"Protect Ya Neck"	1993	—	—	—	—	—	—	—	—	—	RIAA: Platinum	Enter the Wu-Tang (36 Chambers)
"Method Man"	1993	69	40	17	—	—	—	—	—	—	RIAA: Platinum	Enter the Wu-Tang (36 Chambers)
"Can It Be All So Simple"	1994	— (Note: "Can It Be All So Simple" did not enter the Billboard Hot 100, but peaked at number 16 on the Bubbling Under Hot 100 Singles chart.)	82	24	—	—	—	—	—	—		Enter the Wu-Tang (36 Chambers)
"Shame On A Nigga"	1994	—	—	—	—	—	—	—	—	—	RIAA: Gold	Enter the Wu-Tang (36 Chambers)
"C.R.E.A.M."	1994	60	32	8	—	—	—	—	—	—	RIAA: 4× Platinum; BPI: Gold	Enter the Wu-Tang (36 Chambers)
"It'z Yourz"	1997	—	75	21	—	—	—	—	—	—		Wu-Tang Forever
"Reunited"	1997	—	—	—	—	—	—	—	—	—		Wu-Tang Forever
"Triumph"	1997	—	— (Note: "Triumph" did not enter the Hot R&B/Hip-Hop Songs chart, but peaked at number 50 on the R&B/Hip-Hop Airplay chart.)	6	—	—	—	—	—	46	RIAA: Platinum	Wu-Tang Forever
"Gravel Pit"	2000	—	70	20	35	23	7	95	9	6	RIAA: Gold; BPI: Platinum; BVMI: Gold	The W
"Protect Ya Neck (The Jump Off)"	2000	—	52	9	—	—	—	—	—	-		The W
"Careful (Click, Click)"	2001	—	—	—	—	—	—	—	—	—		The W
"Back in the Game"	2001	—	— (Note: "Back in the Game" did not enter the Hot R&B/Hip-Hop Songs chart, but peaked at number five on the Bubbling Under R&B/Hip-Hop Singles chart.)	—	—	—	—	—	—	—		Iron Flag
"Rules"	2001	—	—	—	—	—	—	—	—	—		Iron Flag
"Uzi (Pinky Ring)"	2001	—	92	16	—	—	—	—	—	—		Iron Flag
"The Heart Gently Weeps"	2007	—	—	—	—	—	—	—	—	—		8 Diagrams
"Take It Back"	2007	—	—	—	—	—	—	—	—	—		8 Diagrams
"Family Reunion" (retitled Wu-Tang Reunion on album)	2013	—	—	—	—	—	—	—	—	—		A Better Tomorrow
"Keep Watch"	2014	—	—	—	—	—	—	—	—	—		A Better Tomorrow
"Ron O'Neal"	2014	—	—	—	—	—	—	—	—	—		A Better Tomorrow
"People Say" (featuring Redman)	2017	—	—	—	—	—	—	—	—	—		Wu-Tang: The Saga Continues
"—" denotes a recording that did not chart or was not released in that territory.

=== Other charted songs ===
Title	Year	Certifications	Album
"Bring Da Ruckus"	1993	RIAA: Gold	Enter the Wu-Tang (36 Chambers)
"Da Mystery of Chessboxin'"	1993	RIAA: Gold	Enter the Wu-Tang (36 Chambers)
"Wu-Tang Clan Ain't Nuthin ta F' Wit"	1993	RIAA: Platinum	Enter the Wu-Tang (36 Chambers)

== Other appearances ==
Year	Track(s)	Artist(s)	Album
1994	"Anything (Old School Remix)"	SWV, ODB, Method Man & U-God	The Remixes / Above the Rim OST
1994	"Can It Be All So Simple (Remix)"	Raekwon & Ghostface Killah	Fresh OST/ Only Built for Cuban Lynx
1995	"Let Me at Them"	Inspectah Deck	Tales from the Hood OST
1995	"Dirty Dancing"	ODB & Method Man	The Jerky Boys: The Movie OST/ Return to the 36 Chambers
1996	"America"	Killah Priest, Raekwon, RZA, Masta Killa & Inspectah Deck	America Is Dying Slowly
1997	"Diesel"	ODB, Raekwon, RZA, Method Man & U-God	Soul in the Hole OST
1997	"Sucker M.C.'s"	RZA, ODB & Method Man	In tha Beginning...There Was Rap
1998	"The Worst"	Onyx, Raekwon, Method Man & Killa Sin	Ride (soundtrack)
1998	"Say What You Want"	Texas, Method Man & RZA	The Greatest Hits
1998	"Put Your Hammer Down"	Funkmaster Flex, Ghostface Killah, Method Man, Inspectah Deck, U-God, Raekwon & GZA	The Mix Tape, Vol. 3: 60 Minutes of Funk
1998	"Windpipe"	RZA, Ghostface Killah & Ol' Dirty Bastard	Belly OST
1998	"And You Don't Stop"	Streetlife, Masta Killa, ODB & Method Man	Rush Hour OST
1999	"Shaolin Worldwide"	Inspectah Deck, Streetlife, Method Man	Next Friday OST
2000	"Fast Shadow"	Method Man, ODB, RZA, Masta Killa & U-God	Ghost Dog: The Way of the Samurai OST
2000	"The Abduction"	Tony Touch, GZA, RZA, Masta Killa, Ghostface Killah & Inspectah Deck	The Piece Maker
2000	"Shame" "Wu-Tang Clan Ain't Nothing ta Fuck Wit" "For Heaven's Sake 2000"	System of a Down, Tom Morello, Chad Smith, Ozzy Osbourne, Tony Iommi & Wu-Tang	Loud Rocks
2001	"What You in Fo"	RZA, Method Man, Streetlife & Raekwon	Oz OST
2002	"K.B. Ridin'"	RZA, Method Man, Ghostface Killah & Shacronz, Suga Bang Bang	The Sting
2004	"Black Mamba"	ODB	Kill Bill Volume 2 OST {hidden track}
2004	"Rock Steady"	Tony Touch, Raekwon, Method Man & U-God	The Piece Maker 2
2006	"9 Milli Bros."	Ghostface	Fishscale
2012	"Rivers of Blood"	Raekwon, U-God, Ghostface Killah & Kool G Rap	The Man With the Iron Fists OST
2012	"Six Directions of Boxing"	U-God, Ghostface Killah, GZA, Masta Killa, Cappadonna & Inspectah Deck	The Man With the Iron Fists OST
2018	“Wu Tang Forever”	Logic & Wu-Tang Clan	YSIV
2020	“Hi”	Texas, RZA & Ghostface Killah	Hi

== See also ==
- RZA discography
- GZA discography
- Ol' Dirty Bastard discography
- Method Man discography
- Raekwon discography
- Ghostface Killah discography
- Inspectah Deck discography
- U-God discography
- Masta Killa discography
- Cappadonna discography
- Wu-Tang Clan videography
