= Wu-Tang Clan videography =

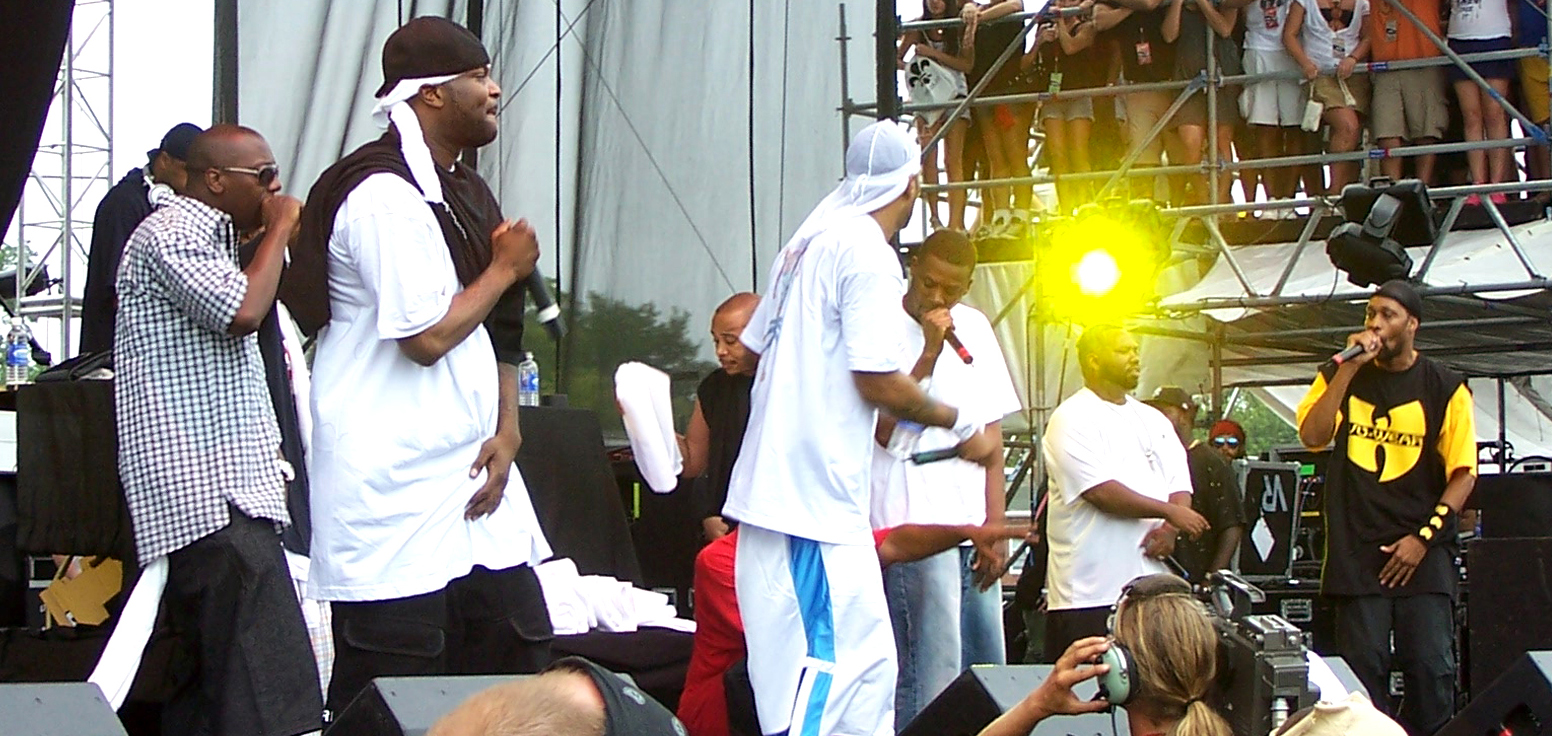
Members of the Wu-Tang Clan and their affiliates performing at the Virgin Festival in Baltimore

The Wu-Tang Clan is a New York City–based hip-hop musical group, consisting of nine American rappers: RZA, GZA, Raekwon, U-God, Ghostface Killah, Inspectah Deck, Method Man, Masta Killa, and the late Ol' Dirty Bastard.

One of the most critically and commercially successful hip hop groups of all time, Wu-Tang Clan rose to fame with their uncompromising brand of hardcore rap music. Since their debut, they have introduced or launched the careers of numerous other artists and groups, and already in 1994 there were credited to be over 300 Wu-Tang Clan affiliates, known as the Wu-Tang Killa Bees, consisting of rappers, producers, and record label CEOs. RZA stated that Wu-Tang Clan has sold around 40 million records around the world. That is if you add up the albums from every single MC from the Clan, plus the Wu-Tang itself.

This videography is a list of Wu-Tang Clan and official Wu-Tang Clan affiliates video related releases, including music videos and DVDs.

Wu-Tang Clan videography
Artist(s)	Album Info	Video Title(s)	Release year & Record Company
RZA	Ooh I Love You Rakeem	Ooh I Love You Rakeem	1991 Tommy Boy Records
Enter the Wu-Tang (36 Chambers)	Enter The Wu-Tang (36 Chambers)	Protect Ya Neck; Can It Be All So Simple; C.R.E.A.M.; Wu-Tang Clan Ain't Nuthing ta Fuck Wit'/Shame on a Nigga; M.E.T.H.O.D. Man; Da Mystery of Chessboxin	1993 RCA Records/Loud Records /Bertelsmann Music Group
Gravediggaz	6 Feet Deep	Nowhere to Run, Nowhere to Hide; 1-800 Suicide; Diary of a Madman (with Killah Priest and Scientific Shabazz)	1994 Island Records/PolyGram Records/Gee Street Records
Method Man	Tical	Bring the Pain; Release Yo' Delf (with Blue Raspberry); I'll Be There For You/You're All I Need To Get By (with Mary J. Blige)	1994 Def Jam Recordings
Big Daddy Kane	Daddy's Home	Show & Prove (with Scoob Lover, Sauce Money, Ol' Dirty Bastard, Jay-Z, Shyheim)	1994 MCA Records
Shaquille O'Neal	Shaq Fu: Da Return	No Hook (with Method Man, The RZA)	1994 Jive Records
Ol' Dirty Bastard	Return to the 36 Chambers: The Dirty Version	Shimmy Shimmy Ya/Baby C'mon; Brooklyn Zoo	1995 Elektra Records
Mariah Carey	Fantasy 12"	Fantasy (Remix) [with Ol' Dirty Bastard]	1995 Columbia Records
Boyz II Men	Vibin' 12"	Vibin' (Remix) [with Method Man, Treach, Craig Mack, Busta Rhymes]	
Raekwon	Only Built 4 Cuban Linx...	Criminology (with Ghostface Killah); Heaven & Hell (with Ghostface Killah and Blue Raspberry); Ice Cream (with Ghostface Killah, Method Man, and Cappadonna); Incarcerated Scarfaces (with Ghostface Killah); Glaciers of Ice (with Ghostface Killah and Masta Killa	1995 RCA Records/Loud Records/Bertelsmann Music Group
GZA	Liquid Swords	I Gotcha Back (with RZA); Cold World (with Life and Inspectah Deck); Liquid Swords (with RZA); Shadow Boxin' (with Method Man) / 4th Chamber (with Ghostface Killah, Killah Priest and The RZA)	1995 MCA Records/Geffen Records
Method Man	Batman Forever (Soundtrack)	The Riddler	1995 Atlantic Records
Method Man & Redman	The Show (soundtrack)	How High (with Redman)	1995 Def Jam Records
Ol' Dirty Bastard	O.D.B.E.P	Shimmy Shimmy Ya (Remix) [with E-40 and MC Eiht]	1996 Elektra Records
Busta Rhymes	Woo-Hah!! 12"	Woo-Hah!! Got You All in Check (Remix) [with Ol' Dirty Bastard]	1996 Flipmode/Elektra Records
Real Live	12"	Real Live Shit (Remix) [with Ghostface KIllah, Lord Tariq, Cappadonna, Killa Sin]	
The RZA, Method Man	High School High (soundtrack)	Wu-Wear (The Garment Renaissance) [with Cappadonna]	1996 Big Beat/Atlantic Records
Ghostface Killah	Ironman	Daytona 500 (with Raekwon, Cappadonna and The Force M.D.s); All That I Got Is You (with Tekitha); Camay (with Raekwon and Cappadonna); Motherless Child (with Raekwon)	1996 Sony Music Entertainment/Epic Records/Razor Sharp Records
Busta Rhymes, B-Real, LL Cool J, Coolio, Method Man	Space Jam (soundtrack)	Hit 'Em High	1996 Atlantic Records/Warner Sunset Records
RZA	Rhyme & Reason (soundtrack)	Tragedy	1997 Priority Records
Tha Alkaholiks	Likwidation	Hip Hop Drunkies (with Ol' Dirty Bastard)	1997 Loud Records
LL Cool J	Phenomenon	4,3,2,1 (with DMX, Method Man, Redman, Canibus)	1997 Def Jam Records
Davina, Raekwon	Hoodlum (soundtrack)	So Good	1997 Loud Records
Blackstreet	Fix 12"	Fix (with Ol' Dirty Bastard & Slash)	
Wu-Tang Clan	Wu-Tang Forever	Triumph; It's Yourz/Older Gods; Reunited	1997 RCA Records/Loud Records/Bertelsmann Music Group
Afro Jazz	Afrocalypse	Strictly Hip Hop (with Ol' Dirty Bastard)	
Gravediggaz	The Pick, the Sickle and the Shovel	The Night the Earth Cried; Dangerous Mindz	1997 Bertelsmann Music Group/V2 Records/Gee Street Records
Soul Assassins	The Soul Assassins, Chapter I	Third World (with RZA & GZA)	
Cappadonna	The Pillage	Slang Editorial; Run; Milk the Cow; Black Boy (with Tekitha)	1998 Epic Records/Razor Sharp Records
Pras, Mya, Ol' DIrty Bastard	Bulworth (soundtrack)	Ghetto Supastar	
ONYX	Ride (soundtrack)/Shut 'Em Down	The Worst (with Killa Sin, Method Man, Raekwon, Shyheim)	1998 Def Jam Recordings/Jam Master Jay Records
Funkmaster Flex	The Mix Tape, Vol. III	Wu-Tang Cream Team Line Up (with Raekwon, Killa Sin, Inspectah Deck, Method Man)	1998 Loud Records
Wu-Tang Killa Bees	The Swarm	Cobra Clutch (with Ghostface Killah)	1998 Priority Records
Sunz of Man	The Last Shall Be First	Shining Star (with Ol' Dirty Bastard & Earth, Wind & Fire)	1998 Red Ant Entertainment
Jayo Felony	Whatcha Gonna Do?	Whatcha Gonna Do? (with Method Man, DMX)	1998 Def Jam Recordings/
DMX, Method Man, Nas, Ja Rule	Belly (soundtrack)	Grand Finale	1998 Def Jam Recordings/
Fat Joe	Don Cartagena	John Blaze (with Jadakiss, Nas, Big Pun, Raekwon)	1998 Atlantic/Mystic/Big Beat Recordings
La the Darkman	Heist of the Century	Spring Water (with Raekwon)	
Outkast	Aquemini	Skew It on the Bar-B (with Raekwon)	1998 LaFace/Arista Records
Pete Rock	Soul Survivor	Tru Master (with Kurupt, Inspectah Deck)	
Method Man	Tical 2000: Judgement Day	Judgement Day; Break Ups 2 Make Ups (with D'angelo)	1998 Def Jam Recordings
RZA	Bobby Digital: in Stereo	(Holocaust (Silkworm) [with Ms. Roxy, Ghostface KIllah, Doc Doom, Killa Sin]; Domestic Violence (with Jamie Sommers); Daily Routine (with Kinetic 9)	1998 Bertelsmann Music Group/V2 Records/Gee Street Records
RZA, Kool G Rap	Ghost Dog: The Way of the Samurai (soundtrack)	Cakes	1999 Razor Sharp/Epic Records
GZA	Beneath the Surface	Crash Your Crew (with Ol' Dirty Bastard); Breaker, Breaker	1999 MCA Records
Limp Bizkit	Significant Other	N 2 Gether Now (with Method Man)	
Sway & King Tech	This or That	The Anthem (with RZA, Chino XL, Tech N9ne, Xzibit, Eminem, KRS-One, Pharoahe Monch, Kool G Rap)	1999 Interscope Records
EPMD	Out of Business	Symphony 2000 (with Method Man & Redman, Lady Luck)	1999 Def Jam Records
Charli Baltimore	Cold as Ice	Stand Up (with Ghostface KIllah)	1999 Epic Records
Ol' Dirty Bastard	Nigga Please	Got Your Money (with Kelis)	1999 Elektra Records
Method Man & Redman	Blackout!	Y.O.U.; Da Rockwilder; Tear It Off	1999 Def Jam Recordings
Inspectah Deck	Uncontrolled Substance	Word on the Street; Show N Prove	1999 Loud Records/Relativity Records
Blondie	12"	No Exit (Loud Remix) [with Mobb Deep, U-God & Inspectah Deck)	
U-God	Golden Arms Redemption	Dat's Gangsta; Bizarre	1999 Warner Bros. Records/Priority Records
Tash	Rap Life	Rap Life (with Raekwon)	1999 Loud Records
Raekwon	Immobilarity	100 Rounds; Live From New York	1999 Sony Music Entertainment/Columbia Records/Loud Records
Ghostface Killah	Supreme Clientele	Apollo Kids (with Raekwon); Cherchez LaGhost (with Madam Majestic & U-God); Mighty Healthy	2000 Sony Music Entertainment/Epic Records/Razor Sharp Records
Afu-Ra	Body of the Life Force	Bigacts, Littleacts (with GZA)	
American Cream Team	Black and White (soundtrack)	It's Not a Game (with RZA & Raekwon)	2000 RCA Records
DJ Muggs	Soul Assassins II	When the Fat Lady Sings (with GZA)	2000 Ruff Life Records
Wu-Tang Clan	The W	Proteck Ya Neck (The Jump Off); Gravel Pit; Careful (Click, Click); I Can't Go to Sleep	2000 Sony Music Entertainment/Columbia Records/Loud Records
Method Man & Teddy Riley	Rush Hour 2 (soundtrack)	Party and Bullshit	2001 Def Jam Records
Method Man & Redman	How High (soundtrack)	How High Round & Round (Remix) [with Jonell]	2001 Def Jam Records
RZA	Digital Bullet	Brooklyn Babies (with The Force M.D.s & Masta Killa); La Rhumba (with Ndira, Method Man, Killa Sin, & Beretta 9)	2001 Koch Records
Cappadonna	The Yin and the Yang	Super Model (with Ghostface Killah)	2001 Razor Sharp Records/Epic Records
Ghostface Killah	Bulletproof Wallets	Never Be the Same Again (with Raekwon and Carl Thomas)	2001 Epic Records/SME Records
Wu-Tang Clan	Iron Flag	Uzi (Pinky Ring)	2001 Loud Records/Columbia Records
Wu-Tang Killa Beez	The Sting	Killa Beez (with U-God, Inspectah Deck, Suga Bang Bang and RZA)	2002 Koch Records
GZA	Legend of the Liquid Sword	Knock, Knock	2002 MCA Records/Universal Records
Inspectah Deck	The Movement	The Movement	2003 Koch Records
The RZA & Supa Saian Crew	The World According to RZA	Saian (with Ghostface KIllah)	2003 Virgin/EMI Records
Mary J. Blige	Love & Life	Love @ 1st Sight (with Method Man)	2003 Geffen Records
Mark Ronson	Here Comes the Fuzz	Ooh Wee (with Nate Dogg & Ghostface KIllah)	2003 Elektra Records
The RZA	Birth of a Prince	Grits (with Allah Real, Masta Killa)	2003 Wu Records/Sanctuary/BMG Records
Masta Killa	No Said Date	Old Man (with RZA)	2004 Nature Sounds
Ghostface Killah	The Pretty Toney Album	Push (with Missy Elliott); Run (Remix) (with Jadakiss, C.O.M.P)	2004 Def Jam Records
Method Man	Tical 0: The Prequel	What's Happenin (with Busta Rhymes); The Show	2004 Def Jam Records
The RZA, Prodigal Sunn, Christ Bearer	Unleashed (soundtrack)	Unleash Me	
GZA & DJ Muggs	Grandmasters	General Principles	2005 Angeles Records
U-God	Mr. Xcitement	Bump	2005 Free Agency Records
Ashanti	Collectables by Ashanti	Still on It (with Method Man, Paul Wall)	2005 Murder Inc. Def Jam Records
Ghostface Killah	Fishscale	Back Like That (with Ne-Yo)	2006 Def Jam Records
Wyclef Jean	Carnival Vol. II: Memoirs of an Immigrant	Sweetest Girl (Dollar Bill Remix) [with Raekwon, Akon, Lil Wayne]	2007 Columbia Records
Ghostface Killah	The Big Doe Rehab	We Celebrate (with Kid Capri)	2007 Def Jam Records
RZA	Digi Snacks	You Can't Stop Me Now Drama (with Thea and Monk)	2008 Wu Music Group/Koch
N.A.S.A.	The Spirit of Apollo	Way Down (with RZA, John Frusciante, Barbie Hatch)	2009 ANTI- Records
U-God	Dopium	Wu-Tang (with Method Man)	2009 Babygrande Records
Ghostface Killah	Ghostdini: Wizard of Poetry in Emerald City	Baby	2009 Def Jam Recordings
Raekwon	Only Built 4 Cuban Linx... Pt. II	New Wu (with Method Man, Ghostface Killah); House of Flying Daggers (with Method Man, GZA, Inspectah Deck, Ghostface Killah); Walk wit Me; Ason Jones; Catalina (with Lyfe Jennings); Have Mercy (with Beanie Sigel); Surgical Gloves; Canal Street	2009 Ice H20 Records/EMI Records
Inspectah Deck	Manifesto	The Champion	2010 Urban Icon Records/Traffic Entertainment Group
Capone-N-Noreaga	The War Report 2: Report the War	The Reserves (with Raekwon)	2010 Thugged Out/EMI Records
Wu-Tang Clan	Wu-Massacre	Our Dreams	2010 Def Jam Records
Ghostface Killah	Apollo Kids	2getha Baby	2010 Def Jam Records
Travis Barker	Give the Drummer Some	Carry It (with RZA, Raekwon, Tom Morello)	2011 Interscope Records

Wu-Tang Clan Affiliates' videography
Artist(s)	Album Info	Video titles(s)	Release date
Shyheim	AKA the Rugged Child	Pass It Off; On & On; One's for da Money	1994 Virgin/EMI Records
Sunz of Man	12" Single	Soldiers of Darkness (with Killa Sin, 9th Prince, various Wu-Tang Clan cameos)	1995 WU-Tang Records
Shyheim	The Lost Generation	Shaolin Style This Iz Real	1996 Noo Trybe Records
Immature	12" single	Lover's Groove (Get Hooked Remix) [with Shyheim]	
Wu-All Stars	Soul in the Hole (soundtrack)	Soul in the Hole (with Killa Sin, Shyheim, Tekitha)	1997 Loud/Relativity Records
Killarmy	Silent Weapons for Quiet Wars	Swinging Swords; Fair, Love & War; Wake Up (with Hell Razah, Prodigal Sunn and various Wu-Tang Clan cameos); Wu-Renegades (with various Wu-Tang Clan cameos)	1997 EMI Music/Priority Records/Wu-Tang Records
Killah Priest	Heavy Mental	Cross my heart (with GZA and Inspectah Deck); One Step (with Hell Razah, Tekitha)	1998 MCA Records/Geffen Records
Wu-Tang Killa Beez	The Swarm	The Legacy (with Royal Fam); Co-Defendant (with Shyheim and Hell Razah); Bronx War Stories (with A.I.G.); Where Was Heaven (with Wu-Syndicate)	1998 Wu-Tang/Priority Records
Sunz of Man	The Last Shall Be First	Shining Star (with Ol' Dirty Bastard); The Plan	1998 Red Ant/Wu-Tang Records
Killarmy	Dirty Weaponry	The Shoot-Out	1998 Wu-Tang Records
Shyheim	My Brother's Keeper	Manchild (with Tekitha)	
Killah Priest	The Corruptor (soundtrack)	5 Boroughs (with Prodigy, Redman, KRS-One, Buckshot)	1999 Jive Records
Killah Priest	View from Masada	What Part of the Game? (with Ras Kass)	
Killarmy	Fear, Love & War	Feel It	2001
Hell Razah	Renaissance Child	Renaissance (with Tragedy Khadafi, Timbo King, R.A. the Rugged Man)	2007 Nature Sounds
Hell Razah and Blue Sky Black Death	Razah's Ladder	Razah's Ladder	2007 Babygrande
Hell Razah and 4th Disciple	Freedom of Speech	High Science	2009 X-Ray Records
Bizz	Prince of Jersey	Realist Spittin (with Kinetic 9)	2009 Blakglobe

== DVD ==
Wu-Tang Clan DVDs
Title(s)	Information
Disciples of the 36 Chambers: Chapter 2	Released: October 19, 2004; Canadian certification: Gold
Legend of the Wu-Tang: The Videos	Released: June 17, 2005
Wu: The Story of the Wu-Tang Clan	Released: November 18, 2008

Wu-Tang Clan DVDs
Artist	Title(s)	Information
Hell Razah	The Razah Code: Underground Hip-Hop Vol. 1	2004
