= The Essential Wu-Tang Clan =

Compilation album by Wu-Tang Clan
- Released: October 29, 2013
- Genres: East Coast hip-hop, hardcore hip-hop
- Length: 1:58:21
- Labels: Wu-Tang; Columbia; Legacy
- Producers: RZA; Ol’ Dirty Bastard; 4th Disciple; Mathematics; Trackmasters; True Master

Wu-Tang Clan chronology
| Legendary Weapons (2011) | The Essential Wu-Tang Clan (2013) | A Better Tomorrow (2014) |

The Essential Wu-Tang Clan is a compilation album by the American hip hop group Wu-Tang Clan, released October 29, 2013, by Wu-Tang Records. It follows 2011's Legendary Weapons. The Essential Wu-Tang Clan features performances by all Wu-Tang members and several affiliates.

== Critical reception ==
Professional ratings
Review scores
| Source | Rating |
|---|---|
| AllMusic | 4/5 stars |

The Essential Wu-Tang Clan was met with positive reviews. It was noted for the influential and groundbreaking sound from the '90s hip-hop collective. With its distinctive style, with dark, atmospheric backing tracks (often punctuated by samples from vintage martial arts movies).

== Track listing ==
Credits adapted from the album's liner notes.

Disc One
| No. | Title | Original Album | Writer(s) | Producer(s) | Time |
| 1 | "Da Mystery of Chessboxin'" | Enter the Wu-Tang (36 Chambers) | Clifford Smith; Gary Grice; Dennis Coles; Lamont Hawkins; Robert Diggs; Corey Woods; Jason Hunter; Russell Jones | The RZA; Ol’ Dirty Bastard^{[a]} | 4:48 |
| 2 | "As High as Wu-Tang Get" | Wu-Tang Forever | C. Smith; Grice; Diggs; Jones | The RZA | 2:38 |
| 3 | "C.R.E.A.M." | Enter the Wu-Tang (36 Chambers) | C. Smith; Woods; Hunter; Diggs; David Porter; Isaac Hayes | The RZA | 4:07 |
| 4 | "Cash Still Rules/Scary Hours (Still Don't Nothing Move but the Money)" | Wu-Tang Forever | C. Smith; Coles; Woods; Selwyn Bougard | 4th Disciple | 3:02 |
| 5 | "Rules" (featuring Streetlife) | Iron Flag | C. Smith; Coles; Woods; Hunter; Elgin Turner; Patrick Charles; Ronald Bean | Mathematics | 3:52 |
| 6 | "I Can't Go to Sleep" (featuring Isaac Hayes) | The W | Coles; Diggs; Hayes | The RZA | 3:35 |
| 7 | "Uzi (Pinky Ring)" | Iron Flag | C. Smith; Grice; Woods; Coles; Hawkins; Diggs; Hunter; Jones; Turner; Clarence Reid | The RZA | 5:18 |
| 8 | "America" (featuring Killah Priest) | America Is Dying Slowly | Woods; Diggs; Hunter; Turner; Walter Reed | The RZA | 5:34 |
| 9 | "Gravel Pit" (featuring Paulissa Moorman) | The W | C. Smith; Woods; Diggs; Coles; Hawkins; Paulisa Moorman | The RZA | 4:14 |
| 10 | "The Projects" (featuring Shyheim) | Wu-Tang Forever | C. Smith; Woods; Diggs; Coles; Hawkins | The RZA | 3:18 |
| 11 | "Back in the Game" (featuring Ronald Isley) | Iron Flag | C. Smith; Woods; Coles; Hunter; Jean-Claude Olivier; Samuel Barnes | The Trackmasters | 4:29 |
| 12 | "What You in Fo'" (featuring Streetlife) | Oz | C. Smith; Woods; Diggs; Charles | True Master | 3:08 |
| 13 | "The Monument" (featuring Busta Rhymes) | The W | C. Smith; Woods; Diggs; Coles; Hawkins; Trevor Smith | The RZA | 2:38 |
| 14 | "Can It Be All So Simple" | Enter the Wu-Tang (36 Chambers) | Woods; Diggs; Coles; Alan Bergman; Marilyn Bergman; Marvin Hamlisch | The RZA | 4:12 |
| 15 | "The W" | Bonus Track from Iron Flag | C. Smith; Grice; Woods; Diggs; Hawkins | The RZA | 3:41 |
58:34

Disc Two
| No. | Title | Original Album | Writer(s) | Producer(s) | Time |
| 1 | "Protect Ya Neck" | Enter the Wu-Tang (36 Chambers) | Clifford Smith; Gary Grice; Dennis Coles; Lamont Hawkins; Robert Diggs; Corey Woods; Jason Hunter; Russell Jones | The RZA | 4:32 |
| 2 | "Reunited" | Wu-Tang Forever | C. Smith; Grice; Diggs; Jones | The RZA | 5:22 |
| 3 | "Shame on a Nigga" | Enter the Wu-Tang (36 Chambers) | C. Smith; Grice; Coles; Hawkins; Diggs; Woods; Hunter; Jones | The RZA | 2:54 |
| 4 | "Hollow Bones" | The W | Coles; Diggs; Woods; Hunter | The RZA | 3:16 |
| 5 | "Triumph" (featuring Cappadonna) | Wu-Tang Forever | C. Smith; Grice; Coles; Hawkins; Diggs; Woods; Hunter; Jones; Jamel Irief; Darryl Hill | The RZA | 5:38 |
| 6 | "Redbull" (featuring Redman) | The W | C. Smith; Diggs; Hunter; Reginald Noble | The RZA | 3:54 |
| 7 | "Method Man" (performed by Method Man) | Enter the Wu-Tang (36 Chambers) | C. Smith; Diggs | The RZA | 5:00 |
| 8 | "It's Yourz" | Wu-Tang Forever | Coles; Hawkins; Diggs; Woods; Hunter; Juergen Koduletsch; Mats Bjoerklyn; Thoris Baldursson | The RZA | 4:14 |
| 9 | "Put Your Hammer Down" | The Mix Tape, Vol. III | C. Smith; Grice; Coles; Hawkins; Diggs; Woods; Hunter | The RZA | 2:04 |
| 10 | "One Blood Under W" (featuring Junior Reid) | The W | Diggs; Elgin Turner; Delroy Reid | The RZA | 4:12 |
| 11 | "Diesel" (featuring Ron Isley) | Soul in the Hole | C. Smith; Grice; Coles; Hawkins; Diggs; Woods; Hunter; Jones | The RZA | 5:30 |
| 12 | "Careful (Click, Click)" | The W | Hawkins; Diggs; Hunter; Hill; Turner | The RZA | 4:25 |
| 13 | "Protect Ya Neck (The Jump Off)" | The W | C. Smith; Grice; Coles; Hawkins; Diggs; Woods; Hunter; Jones | The RZA | 3:38 |
| 14 | "Wu-Tang: 7th Chamber - Part II" | Enter the Wu-Tang (36 Chambers) | C. Smith; Grice; Coles; Hawkins; Diggs; Woods; Hunter; Jones | The RZA | 5:08 |
59:47

Notes

- ^{^[a]} signifies a co-producer.
