= Legend of the Wu-Tang: Wu-Tang Clan's Greatest Hits =

Greatest hits album by Wu-Tang Clan
- Released: October 26, 2004
- Genre: Hip-hop
- Length: 69:42
- Label: BMG Heritage

Wu-Tang Clan chronology
Disciples of the 36 Chambers: Chapter 1 (2004)	Legend of the Wu-Tang: Wu-Tang Clan's Greatest Hits (2004)	Wu-Tang Meets the Indie Culture (2005)

Professional ratings
Review scores
Source	Rating
AllMusic	4/5 stars
AllHipHop	4/5 stars
NME	10/10
RapReviews	8/10
Tom Hull	A−

Legend of the Wu-Tang: Wu-Tang Clan's Greatest Hits is a compilation album by the American hip hop group Wu-Tang Clan, released in 2004. It is notable for including the original uncensored version known as the "Bloody Version" of "Protect Ya Neck", a remix of the song "Method Man" with alternate verses, as well as "Shaolin Worldwide", "Sucker M.C.'s" (a Run D.M.C. cover) and "Diesel", three tracks the Wu-Tang produced for soundtracks and compilations. The inside booklet can be unfolded to form a mini-poster of the group. The album was made to further cement Wu Tang Clan's legacy as one of the most influential groups in recent years. The album was also made to not only help introduce new listeners to the group's music but to also satisfy fans of the group as well.

The album debuted at number 72 on the Billboard 200 chart. In the United Kingdom, it opened at number 28 on the UK Hip Hop and R&B Albums Chart. In 2025, the album was certified Gold by BPI.

== Track listing ==
Legend of the Wu-Tang: Wu-Tang Clan's Greatest Hits track listing
No.	Title	Original album	Length
1.	"C.R.E.A.M."	Enter the Wu-Tang (36 Chambers)	4:10
2.	"Method Man" (Skunk Mix)	Enter the Wu-Tang (36 Chambers)	3:09
3.	"Protect Ya Neck" (Bloody Version)	Enter the Wu-Tang (36 Chambers)	5:03
4.	"Wu-Tang Clan Ain't Nuthing ta F' Wit"	Enter the Wu-Tang (36 Chambers)	3:32
5.	"Can It Be All So Simple"	Enter the Wu-Tang (36 Chambers)	4:11
6.	"Shame on a Nigga"	Enter the Wu-Tang (36 Chambers)	2:54
7.	"Da Mystery of Chessboxin'"	Enter the Wu-Tang (36 Chambers)	4:47
8.	"Reunited"	Wu-Tang Forever	5:22
9.	"It's Yourz"	Wu-Tang Forever	4:13
10.	"Triumph" (featuring Cappadonna)	Wu-Tang Forever	5:37
11.	"Gravel Pit"	The W	4:13
12.	"Protect Ya Neck (The Jump Off)"	The W	3:58
13.	"Sucker M.C.'s"	In tha Beginning...There Was Rap	3:44
14.	"Uzi (Pinky Ring)"	Iron Flag	5:17
15.	"Shaolin Worldwide"	Next Friday soundtrack	4:03
16.	"Diesel" (featuring RZA, Method Man, U-God, Raekwon & Ol' Dirty)	Soul in the Hole soundtrack	5:29

== Charts ==
2004 Chart performance for Legend of the Wu-Tang: Wu-Tang Clan's Greatest Hits
Chart (2004)	Peak position
UK R&B Albums (OCC)	28
US Billboard 200	72

2025 Chart performance for Legend of the Wu-Tang: Wu-Tang Clan's Greatest Hits
Chart (2025)	Peak position
Greek Albums (IFPI)	29

== Certifications ==
Region	Certification	Certified units/sales
United Kingdom (BPI)	Gold	100,000^{‡}
^{‡} Sales+streaming figures based on certification alone.
