= Soundtracks from the Shaolin Temple =

Compilation album by Wu-Tang & Wu-Tang Killa Bees
- Released: October 7, 2008
- Genre: Hip hop
- Length: 79:20
- Label: Wanderluxe
- Producer: RZA; Hi-Tek; Bronze Nazareth; Mathematics

Wu-Tang & Wu-Tang Killa Bees chronology
| Return of the Swarm, Vol. 5 (2008) | Soundtracks from the Shaolin Temple (2008) | Wu: The Story of the Wu-Tang Clan (2008) |

Soundtracks from the Shaolin Temple is a 2008 compilation album featuring various artists associated with the rap group Wu-Tang Clan. The album is primarily produced by Bronze Nazareth, with one track produced by Wu-Tang member RZA. Seven Wu-Tang Clan members appear on the album, alongside more than 20 Wu-Tang affiliates, placing it within the Wu-Tang Killer Bees catalog.

== Track listing ==
| # | Title | Performer(s) | Producer | Samples | Time |
|---|---|---|---|---|---|
| 1 | "Darkness (Intro)" | | | | 1:34 |
| 2 | "Killa Bee Swarm" | Almighty; Bronze Nazareth; Timbo King; 5-Star; Killah Priest | Bronze Nazareth | | 4:15 |
| 3 | "Lyrical Swords" | Think Differently; GZA; Ras Kass | Bronze Nazareth | | 3:27 |
| 4 | " More Than Gold" | Bronze Nazareth; Timbo King | Bronze Nazareth | | 4:12 |
| 5 | "On The Eve Of War (Julio Caesar Chavez Mix)" | Jedi Mind Tricks; GZA | Stoupe the Enemy of Mankind | | 4:02 |
| 6 | "Iconoclasts" | Wisemen; Killah Priest; Vast Aire | Bronze Nazareth | | 4:53 |
| 7 | "My Piano" | Hi-Tek; Ghostface Killah; Raekwon; Dion | Hi-Tek | | 4:09 |
| 8 | "Biochemical Equation" | Think Differently; RZA; MF Doom | RZA | | 3:58 |
| 9 | "Pencil" | GZA; Masta Killa; RZA | Mathematics | | 4:00 |
| 10 | "Josephine" | Hi-Tek; Ghostface Killah; Trife Da God; Willie Cottrell Band | Hi-Tek | | 4:11 |
| 11 | " The Obituary (E.B.G.G.)" | T.H.U.G. Angelz | Bronze Nazareth | | 4:15 |
| 12 | "Chi (Interlude)" | | | | 0:33 |
| 13 | "Deep Space" | Lord Jamar; RZA | Preservation | | 4:28 |
| 14 | "Alphabets" | GZA | True Master | | 2:44 |
| 15 | "Original Man" | Lord Jamar; Raekwon; Kasim Allah | Preservation | | 5:33 |
| 16 | "The Bronzeman" | Bronze Nazareth; Killa Sin | Bronze Nazareth | | 3:52 |
| 17 | "God's Creatures (Interlude)" | | | | 2:00 |
| 18 | "Animal" | Icewater | Scram Jones | | 3:49 |
| 19 | "Still Grimey" | Think Differently; Sean Price; U-God; C-Rayz Walz; Prodigal Sunn | Preservation | | 4:18 |
| 20 | "The Ocean" | Holocaust | Blue Sky Black Death | | 3:41 |
| 21 | "Street Corners" | Bronze Nazareth; Masta Killa; GZA; Inspectah Deck; Solomon Child | Bronze Nazareth | | 5:25 |
