= Disciples of the 36 Chambers =

Live album by Wu-Tang Clan
- Released: Album - September 28, 2004; Video - October 5, 2004
- Recorded: July 17, 2004
- Genre: Hip hop
- Length: 65:42
- Labels: Wu/Sanctuary Urban/BMG Records; 06076-84727

Wu-Tang Clan chronology
| Disciples of the 36 Chambers (2004) | Legend of the Wu-Tang: Wu-Tang Clan's Greatest Hits (2004) |

Professional ratings
Review scores
| Source | Rating |
|---|---|
| Allmusic | 2.5/5 stars |
| Entertainment Weekly | B− |
| Pitchfork Media | (7.9/10) |

Disciples of the 36 Chambers is a live album and concert DVD released in 2004 by the Wu-Tang Clan. The album is styled Chapter 1 and the DVD Chapter 2. It is a slightly edited recording of their set at the 2004 Rock the Bells concert in San Bernardino, California. The live set contains many classic hits from the group's albums as well as the individual members' solo albums. All nine original members perform, which by the time of this show was an increasingly rare event.

Including all of the solo albums by individual members, Disciples of the 36 Chambers: Chapter 1 is the 36th album released.

== Track listing ==
1. "Bring da Ruckus" - 1:31
2. "Da Mystery of Chessboxin" - 2:44
3. "Clan in da Front" - 1:09
4. "C.R.E.A.M." - 1:40
5. "Wu-Tang Clan Ain't Nuthin' Ta F' Wit" - 2:08
6. "Shame on a Nigga" - 2:03
7. "Ghost Deini" - 1:50
8. "Reunited" - 3:06
9. "For Heaven's Sake" - 3:00
10. "Criminology" - 1:18
11. "Incarcerated Scarfaces" - 1:12
12. "Brooklyn Zoo" - 2:51
13. "Bring the Pain" - 1:36
14. "It's Yourz" - 2:41
15. "Liquid Swords" - 1:59
16. "One Blood Under W" - 1:39
17. "Ice Cream" - 2:48
18. "Triumph" - 5:01
19. "Hood" - 3:39
20. "Run (Version 1)" - 1:39
21. "Run (Version 2)" - 1:37
22. "Tearz" - 1:33
23. "Method Man" - 2:41
24. "Dog Shit" - 0:59
25. "Shimmy Shimmy Ya" - 5:12
26. "Y'all Been Warned" - 3:12
27. "Gravel Pit" - 4:54
