= The Tao of Wu =

2009 book by RZA

- Author: RZA; Chris Norris (co-author)
- Language: English
- Genre: Music; Philosophy
- Publisher: Riverhead/Berkley/Penguin Books USA
- Publication date: October 15, 2009
- Publication place: United States
- Pages: 243
- ISBN: 978-1594484858
- Preceded by: The Wu-Tang Manual

The Tao of Wu is the second philosophical book written by Wu-Tang Clan member and producer, RZA. It is a sequel to The Wu-Tang Manual.

== Content ==
The book details RZA's personal path towards enlightenment. In the book he uses hip-hop lyrics, autobiographical anecdotes, and parables, to explain how he was simultaneously inspired by Taoism, Hinduism, Buddhism, Christianity, Bruce Lee, and Islam. His philosophies are listed under seven "Pillars of Wisdom", which he considers as seven "key turning points in his life" that he hopes to share on the book's readers. The number seven is symbolic in itself, representing consciousness in numerology, god in the Supreme Mathematics of the Nation of Gods and Earths, and considered a divine number in several faiths such as Judaism, Christianity, and Islam. The book also details The RZA's attempted murder charge, and various production equipment he uses in the making of albums.
