= Black Samson, the Bastard Swordsman =

2025 album by Wu-Tang Clan and Mathematics

Studio album by Wu-Tang and Mathematics
- Released: April 12, 2025
- Genre: Hip-hop
- Labels: All Maf; 36 Chambers; DNA; Hitmaker
- Producers: Mathematics; RZA

Wu-Tang and Mathematics chronology
The Saga Continues (2017)	Black Samson, the Bastard Swordsman (2025)

Singles from Black Samson, the Bastard Swordsman
- 1. "Claudine" Released: October 20, 2023; 2. "Mandingo" Released: March 7, 2025; 3. "Warriors Two, Cooley High" Released: April 11, 2025

Alternative cover
- Vinyl cover

Professional ratings
Review scores
Source	Rating
RapReviews	7.5/10

Black Samson, the Bastard Swordsman is a collaborative studio album by American hip-hop collective Wu-Tang Clan and producer Mathematics, released on April 12, 2025 for Record Store Day. It marks the group's fourth album release under the abbreviated name "Wu-Tang", following Chamber Music, Legendary Weapons, and The Saga Continues, the last of which was also a collaboration with Mathematics.

The album is the first Wu-Tang project since Once Upon a Time in Shaolin to feature all nine living members.

== Release ==
The album was initially released on vinyl as a 2LP set, presented as an authenticated and numbered limited edition. Each album jacket features unique “1 of 1” cover art, making every design truly distinct and highly collectible—a first in the vinyl record industry. The covers are created through a blend of hand-crafted artistry, proprietary technology (without the use of A.I.), and advanced printing techniques. The release is limited to 5,000 copies worldwide, with 1,000 available in the UK. The album released on streaming services on April 25, 2025.

== Track listing ==
All tracks are produced by Mathematics, except where noted.

Black Samson, the Bastard Swordsman tracklist
No.	Title	Performer(s)	Length
1.	"Sucker Free City"	Kurupt; Ralph McDaniels	1:01
2.	"Mandingo (co-produced by RZA)"	Raekwon; Inspectah Deck; Method Man; Cappadonna	4:35
3.	"Lions Roar (The Lion’s Pit) (co-produced by RZA)"	U-God; Kool G Rap; The RZA	4:08
4.	"Claudine"	Method Man; Ghostface Killah; Nicole Bus	4:02
5.	"Shaolin vs. Lama"	Raekwon; Inspectah Deck	3:53
6.	"Executioners from Shaolin"	Inspectah Deck; The GZA; Cappadonna	2:38
7.	"Cleopatra Jones"	Raekwon; Masta Killa	3:33
8.	"Warriors Two, Cooley High (co-produced by Wize Beatz)"	Benny the Butcher; Method Man	2:35
9.	"Let’s Do It Again"	R.J. Payne; 38 Spesh; Willie the Kid; The RZA	3:49
10.	"Dolemite"	Cappadonna; U-God; Masta Killa	4:06
11.	"Trouble Man (Outro) (co-produced by Shroom)"	Kameron Corvet	1:57
12.	"Charleston Blue, Legend of a Fighter (co-produced by Wu-10)"	Crooked I; Cappadonna; Nicole Bus	2:50
13.	"Sinners (Mo' Better Blues)"	Erick Sermon; Keith Murray; Jamal	4:00
Total length:			39:50

== Charts ==
Chart performance for Black Samson, the Bastard Swordsman
Chart (2025)	Peak position
Swiss Albums (Schweizer Hitparade)	20
UK R&B Albums (Official Charts)	8
US Top Album Sales (Billboard)	32
US Vinyl Albums (Billboard)	25
