= The Pillage =

Studio album by Cappadonna
- Released: March 24, 1998
- Recorded: 1996–1997
- Studios: 36 Chambers (New York City); Soundtrack (New York City); Sony (New York City)
- Genre: Hip-hop
- Length: 57:43
- Labels: Razor Sharp; Wu-Tang; Epic Street
- Producers: RZA (also exec.); 4th Disciple; Goldfinghaz; Mathematics; True Master

Cappadonna chronology
The Pillage (1998)	The Yin and the Yang (2001)

Wu-Tang Clan solo chronology
Ironman (1996)	The Pillage (1998)	Tical 2000: Judgement Day (1998)

Singles from The Pillage
- 1. "Slang Editorial" Released: 1998; 2. "Run" Released: 1998

The Pillage is the debut solo studio album by American rapper Cappadonna. It was released on March 24, 1998, through Razor Sharp, Wu-Tang, and Epic Street. The recording sessions took place at 36 Chambers Studio in New York, except for the song "Everything Is Everything", which was recorded at Soundtrack Studios and Sony Music Studios in New York. The production was handled by Wu-Elements (True Master, Goldfinghaz, 4th Disciple, Mathematics) and the RZA, who also served as executive producer together with Ghostface Killah, Mitchell "Divine" Diggs and Oliver "Power" Grant. It features guest appearances from fellow Wu-Tang Clan members and affiliates Killa Bamz, Method Man, Ghostface Killah, Tekitha, Blue Raspberry, Raekwon, Rhyme Recca and U-God.

In the United States, the album debuted at number 3 on the Billboard 200 and topped the Top R&B/Hip-Hop Albums chart with 132,000 copies sold in its first week. In its second week, the album charted at number 16 on the Billboard 200 and sold an additional 63,000 copies. It was certified gold by the Recording Industry Association of America on April 24, 1998. It peaked at No. 8 in Canada, No. 28 in the Netherlands, No. 36 in Finland, No. 43 in the United Kingdom, No. 58 in France and No. 67 in Germany.

The song "Run" later appeared on Bulworth – The Soundtrack.

== Critical reception ==
Professional ratings
Review scores
Source	Rating
AllMusic	4/5 stars
Robert Christgau	(1-star Honorable Mention)
Entertainment Weekly	B
NME	5/10
Pitchfork	3.8/10
RapReviews	7/10
Rolling Stone	4/5 stars
The Source	3.5/5 stars

The Los Angeles Times labeled the album "equal parts garble-mouth boast fest, urban survival kit and sonic boom."

== Track listing ==
The Pillage
No.	Title	Writer(s)	Producer(s)	Length
1.	"Slang Editorial"	Darryl Hill; Derek Harris	True Master	4:46
2.	"Pillage" (featuring Killa Bamz)	Hill; Scott Kinchen	Goldfinghaz	3:14
3.	"Run"	Hill; Robert Diggs	RZA	4:00
4.	"Blood on Blood War" (featuring Killa Bamz)	Hill; Diggs	RZA	3:55
5.	"Supa Ninjaz" (featuring U-God and Method Man)	Hill; Lamont Hawkins; Clifford Smith; Harris	True Master	3:24
6.	"MCF"	Hill; Diggs	RZA	3:54
7.	"Splish Splash"	Hill; Harris	True Master	2:02
8.	"Oh-Donna" (featuring Ghostface Killah)	Hill; Dennis Coles; Ronald Bean	Mathematics	3:50
9.	"Milk the Cow" (featuring Method Man)	Hill; Harris	True Master	3:45
10.	"South of the Border"	Hill; Diggs	True Master	2:51
11.	"Check for a Nigga"	Hill; Selwyn Bougard	4th Disciple	4:00
12.	"Dart Throwing" (featuring Raekwon and Method Man)	Hill; Corey Woods; Smith; Harris	True Master	3:09
13.	"Young Hearts" (featuring Blue Raspberry)	Hill; Diggs	RZA	3:13
14.	"Everything Is Everything" (featuring Rhyme Recca)	Hill; Kinchen	Goldfinghaz	3:49
15.	"Pump Your Fist" (featuring Tekitha and Killa Bamz)	Hill; Tekitha Washington; Diggs	RZA	3:38
16.	"Black Boy" (featuring Tekitha)	Hill; Kinchen	Goldfinghaz	4:13
Total length:				57:43

The Pillage – bonus track for Europe
No.	Title	Writer(s)	Producer(s)	Length
17.	"'97 Mentality" (featuring Ghostface Killah)	Hill; Coles; Diggs	RZA	5:05
Total length:				62:48

Sample credits

- Track 16 contains a sample of "You, I Adore" written by Anthony Sepe and Barry White and performed by the Love Unlimited Orchestra.

== Personnel ==
- Darryl "Cappadonna" Hill – vocals
- Walbert "Killer Bamz" Dale – vocals (tracks: 2, 4, 15)
- Lamont "U-God" Hawkins – vocals (track 5)
- Clifford "Method Man" Smith – vocals (tracks: 5, 9, 12)
- Dennis "Ghostface Killah" Coles – vocals (tracks: 8, 17), executive producer
- Corey "Raekwon" Woods – vocals (track 12)
- Candi "Blue Raspberry" Lindsey – vocals (track 13)
- Thaddaeus "Rhyme Recca" Birkett – vocals (track 14)
- Tekitha Washington – vocals (tracks: 15, 16)
- Derek "True Master" Harris – producer (tracks: 1, 5, 7, 9, 10, 12), mixing (tracks: 1, 5, 8–10, 12)
- Scott "Goldfinghaz" Kinchen – producer & mixing (tracks: 2, 14, 16)
- Robert "RZA" Diggs – producer & mixing (tracks: 3, 4, 6, 13, 15, 17), executive producer, supervisor
- Ronald "Allah Mathematics" Bean – producer (track 8)
- Selwyn "4th Disciple" Bougard – producer & mixing (track 11)
- Ted Wohlsen – mixing (tracks: 1, 7)
- Nolan "Dr. No" Moffitte – mixing (tracks: 2, 14–16), engineering
- Jason Groucott – engineering assistant (tracks: 1, 7)
- Mitchell "Divine" Diggs – executive producer
- Oliver "Power" Grant – executive producer
- Ron Jaramillo – art direction, design
- Daniel Hastings – photography
- Jeff Trotter – A&R

== Charts ==
=== Weekly charts ===
Chart (1998)	Peak position
Canadian Albums (Billboard)	8
Canadian R&B Albums (SoundScan)	1
Dutch Albums (Album Top 100)	28
Finnish Albums (Suomen virallinen lista)	36
French Albums (SNEP)	58
German Albums (Offizielle Top 100)	67
UK Albums (Official Charts)	43
UK R&B Albums (Official Charts)	4
US Billboard 200	3
US Top R&B/Hip-Hop Albums (Billboard)	1

=== Year-end charts ===
Chart (1998)	Position
US Top R&B/Hip-Hop Albums (Billboard)	69

== Certifications ==
Region	Certification	Certified units/sales
United States (RIAA)	Gold	500,000^{^}
^{^} Shipments figures based on certification alone.

== See also ==
- List of Billboard number-one R&B albums of 1998
