= The Saga Continues (Wu-Tang Clan album) =

Compilation album by Wu-Tang
- Released: October 13, 2017
- Recorded: 2016–2017
- Genre: Hip-hop
- Length: 51:35
- Label: 36 Chambers; eOne
- Producer: Mathematics; RZA (exec.)

Wu-Tang chronology
Once Upon a Time in Shaolin (2015)	The Saga Continues (2017)	Black Samson, the Bastard Swordsman (2025)

Alternative cover

The Saga Continues is a compilation album by American rap ensemble Wu-Tang Clan, produced by long-time producer Mathematics. It was released on October 13, 2017, via 36 Chambers Records and eOne. The group adopted the shortened name "Wu-Tang" for this album to highlight the absence of U-God, who was not featured due to ongoing legal issues with the group over royalties. The album marks the third release under the shortened name, following Chamber Music and Legendary Weapons. Producer Mathematics has explained, "It's a Wu-Tang record of course, [but] it can't be a complete Wu-Tang Clan album without U-God."

The Saga Continues was promoted with two singles, "People Say" and "Lesson Learn'd", both featuring Redman. The album debuted on at number 15 on Billboard 200 chart and at number one on Independent Albums having sold 19,461 copies in the first week, and including streams it was 24,613 copies. The compilation was celebrated in 2024 with "Wu-Tang Clan: The Saga Continues… The Las Vegas Residency" at The Theater at Virgin Hotels.

== Background ==
After releasing A Better Tomorrow, the group continued to work on their solo albums: Ghostface Killah released his sequel to Twelve Reasons to Die and collaboration album Sour Soul with BadBadNotGood, Method Man released The Meth Lab, Inspectah Deck put out two albums with his side group Czarface. Masta Killa kept on working his fourth album entitled Loyalty Is Royalty which eventually was released on September 29, 2017.

Meanwhile, Wu-Tang Clan's most controversial album, Once Upon a Time in Shaolin, was sold to Martin Shkreli for $2,000,000.

On August 25, 2017, without any announcement, a track called "People Say" was released stating that it was a new single off Wu-Tang Clan's upcoming album. A few days later, RZA announced that the new project would be entitled The Saga Continues and would be entirely "crafted by" Wu-Tang Clan DJ, Mathematics. In the later interview he commented:

There was a young brother that was our deejay. He was working construction. I hired him to draw the Wu-Tang logo. His name was Allah Mathematics. And he always was in the shadows doing the knowledge. He learned how to make beats and produce and after a while—when I became a composer I became further and further away from the sound of Wu-Tang I mean I don’t use the ASR-10 anymore. Mathematics stayed right there with it. So he was really given the task and he took the task upon himself to go and start having the members re-energize their verses to the classic Wu-Tang sound. After he got it to a certain degree, he was like, “I’m going to come over and show you where we’re at.” He showed me and I was like, “Yo, The Saga Continues"

On September 22, 2017, the second single, "Lesson Learn'd", was released, and on October 4, a video for "People Say" was published on Wu-Tang Clan Vevo YouTube account.

Mixing engineer

- Josh Gannet

== Critical reception ==
Professional ratings
Aggregate scores
Source	Rating
Metacritic	64/100
Review scores
Source	Rating
AllMusic	3.5/5 stars
The A.V. Club	B−
Clash	6/10
Consequence of Sound	C+
The 405	5.5/10
HipHopDX	3.6/5
Slant Magazine	2.5/5 stars
Sputnikmusic	4/5 stars
Tom Hull	A−

Upon its release, The Saga Continues received mixed to positive reviews from most music critics. At Metacritic, which assigns a normalized rating out of 100 to reviews from mainstream critics, the album received an average score of 64, based on 16 reviews, which indicates "generally favorable reviews". AllMusic's reviewer, who gave the album 3 out of 5 stars, stated that "Mathematics fills The Saga Continues with dark, moody beats, atmospheric keyboard patches, snatches of classic soul sides, and samples from vintage kung-fu movies. If this isn't quite a brother to Enter the Wu-Tang (36 Chambers)". Alex McLevy of The A.V. Club rated the album a "B−" calling it more "cobbled-together" than A Better Tomorrow, but also stated that "it turns out to be the best Wu-related effort since 2010’s thin yet enjoyable Wu-Massacre". He also praised Mathematics' production saying that he "has been intricately involved with the Wu since its inception […] and he turns out to do a better RZA than the RZA these days, stitching together more than an hour of trilling violins, head-snap drums, and mawkish hooks". Will Rosebury of Clash Music, rated The Saga Continues a 6 out of 10 stating that "at its best, 'The Saga Continues' captures some of the old Wu magic but unfortunately these moments are few and far between".

Gary Suarez of Consequence of Sound gave that album a "C+" and wrote that "while The Saga Continues engenders enough wistful reminiscences to satisfy the core, it provides shockingly little in the way of memorable moments". Writing for The 405, Chase McMullen rated it 5.5 out of 10, pointing out that "Mathematics’ efforts are admirable, he hoes [sic] his damnedest to recreate a classic Wu vibe, but the whole presentation is gilded, the rappers themselves largely going through the motions". Justin Ivy of HipHopDX rated that album 3.6 out of 5 claiming that "this compilation gives listeners enjoyable music from the Wu-Tang tree that rightfully exists outside of the official album canon". Zachary Hoskins of Slant Magazine gave the album 2½ out of 5 stars and commended that "Enjoying this album will depend on your tolerance for Wu-Tang at its most generic" and rebuked the album saying that "the result is consistent but unambitious".

== Track listing ==
All songs produced by Mathematics.

No.	Title	Writer(s)	Length
1.	"Wu-Tang: The Saga Continues Intro" (featuring RZA)	R. Bean; R. Diggs	1:31
2.	"Lesson Learn'd" (featuring Inspectah Deck & Redman)	Bean; J. Hunter; R. Noble	3:22
3.	"Fast and Furious" (featuring Hue Hef & Raekwon)	Bean; H. Nielsen; C. Woods	3:42
4.	"Famous Fighters (Skit)"	Bean	1:20
5.	"If Time is Money (Fly Navigation)" (featuring Method Man)	Bean; C. Smith	3:53
6.	"Frozen" (featuring Chris Rivers, Killah Priest & Method Man)	Bean; W. Reed; Smith; C. Rios, Jr.	4:09
7.	"Berto and the Fiend" (featuring Ghostface Killah)	Bean; D. Coles	0:45
8.	"Pearl Harbor" (featuring Ghostface Killah, Method Man, RZA & Sean Price)	Bean; Coles; Smith; Diggs; S. Price	4:59
9.	"People Say" (featuring Redman)	Bean; Smith; Woods; Noble; Hunter; E. Turner	4:24
10.	"Family (Skit)"	Bean	1:06
11.	"Why Why Why" (featuring RZA & Swnkah)	Bean; Diggs; Swnkah	4:00
12.	"G'd Up" (featuring Method Man, Mzee Jones & R-Mean)	Bean; Smith; M. Jones; A. Hariri	4:25
13.	"If What You Say is True" (featuring Streetlife)	Bean; Turner; P. Charles; G. Grice; D. Hill	3:55
14.	"Saga (Skit)" (featuring RZA)	Bean; Diggs	0:58
15.	"Hood Go Bang!" (performed by Method Man & Redman)	Bean; Smith; Noble	1:32
16.	"My Only One" (featuring Cappadonna, Ghostface Killah, RZA, Steven Latorre)	Bean; Hill; Coles; Diggs; S. Latorre	4:44
17.	"Message"	Bean	2:05
18.	"The Saga Continues Outro" (featuring RZA)	Bean; Diggs	0:45

== Charts ==
Chart (2017)	Peak position
Austrian Albums (Ö3 Austria)	29
Belgian Albums (Ultratop Flanders)	60
Belgian Albums (Ultratop Wallonia)	154
Canadian Albums (Billboard)	21
Czech Albums (ČNS IFPI)	19
Dutch Albums (Album Top 100)	79
French Albums (SNEP)	69
German Albums (Offizielle Top 100)	37
New Zealand Heatseeker Albums (RMNZ)	3
Scottish Albums (OCC)	39
Swiss Albums (Schweizer Hitparade)	10
UK Albums (OCC)	42
US Billboard 200	15
US Independent Albums (Billboard)	1
US Top R&B/Hip-Hop Albums (Billboard)	8
