= Wu-Tang Clan: Of Mics and Men =

Documentary television series

- Genre: Docu-series
- Created by: Sacha Jenkins
- Composer: J. Ralph
- Original language: English
- No. of seasons: 1
- No. of episodes: 4

Production
- Executive producers: Peter Bittenbender; Chris Gary; Peter J. Scalettar
- Producers: Cary Graber; Vanessa Maruskin
- Cinematography: Hans Charles
- Editor: Paul Greenhouse
- Running time: 60 minutes
- Production companies: Showtime Documentary Films; Mass Appeal; Sony Music Entertainment; Polygram Entertainment; Endeavor Content

Original release
- Network: Showtime
- Release: May 10 – May 31, 2019

Wu-Tang Clan: Of Mics and Men is a four-episode American documentary television series that premiered on Showtime on May 10, 2019. The documentary was created by Sacha Jenkins and tells the story of the New York–based hip-hop group Wu-Tang Clan from their earliest days to commemorate the 25th anniversary of the group.

All nine living members of the group are interviewed in the four 60-minute episodes, and the series also includes footage from 2004 featuring the late Ol' Dirty Bastard. Numerous people affiliated with the Wu-Tang Clan are also featured, sharing their own stories and describing their relations with the members.

The title is a wordplay based on John Steinbeck's literary classic, Of Mice and Men.

On May 17, 2019, an EP, which also is the soundtrack of the documentary, Wu-Tang: Of Mics and Men, was released on Spotify.

== Wu-Tang: Of Mics and Men EP ==
A week after the documentary premiere, 36 Chambers Records along with Mass Appeal released a seven-track EP entitled Wu-Tang: Of Mics and Men. The EP contains verses from several Wu-Tang Clan members, including RZA, Ghostface Killah, Cappadonna, Raekwon and Masta Killa. Three of the tracks are skits which contains interview excerpts from Nas, GZA, Masta Killa and Cheo Hodari Coker.

=== Track listing ===
No.	Title	Music	Length
1.	"On That Shit Again" (RZA & Ghostface Killah)	DJ Scratch	3:20
2.	"Seen a Lot of Things" (Ghostface Killah, Raekwon & Harley)	Core	3:11
3.	"Project Kids (Skit)" (Nas)	RZA	1:57
4.	"Do the Same As My Brother Do" (RZA)	RZA	3:25
5.	"Yo, Is You Cheo? (Skit)" (Cheo Hodari Coker)	RZA	1:40
6.	"Of Mics and Men" (RZA, Cappadonna & Masta Killa)	VitalSignzEnt	3:18
7.	"One Rhyme (Skit)" (GZA & Masta Killa)	RZA	2:07
Total length:			18:54
