= The Wu-Tang Manual =

Book by RZA

- Author: RZA; Chris Norris (co-writer)
- Language: English
- Genre: Music
- Publisher: Riverhead
- Publication date: October 2004
- Publication place: United States
- Pages: 243
- ISBN: 1-59448-018-4
- OCLC: 260048684
- Dewey Decimal: 782.421649/092/2 22
- LC Class: ML421.W8 R9 2005
- Followed by: The Tao of Wu

The Wu-Tang Manual is a guide to the Wu-Tang Clan written by prominent member and producer RZA as well as Chris Norris. The manual explains Wu-Tang terms, Wu-Tang members, merchandise, movies and inspirations.

== Content ==
It is divided into four books each containing nine chambers totaling 36 chambers. Included are biographies of each member, an explanation of various slang used by the group, a history on the Wu-Tang Clan logo, and explanations of influences, which include the Nation of Gods and Earths, chess, comic books, drugs, and martial arts. RZA's views on music, spirituality, philosophy, and producing, and a guide to the meanings of several songs are also included. The back cover page features a colorful photo that resembles the one used on the album cover of Wu-Tang's 2001 album Iron Flag.

The book is followed by a sequel titled The Tao of Wu.
