= Protect Ya Neck =

1992 single by Wu-Tang Clan

Single by Wu-Tang Clan

from the album Enter the Wu-Tang (36 Chambers)
- B-side: "After the Laughter Comes Tears" "Method Man" (reissue)
- Released: December 14, 1992; May 3, 1993 (reissue)
- Recorded: 1992
- Genre: Hardcore hip-hop
- Length: 4:37 (Radio edit); 5:01 (Original, uncensored aka "Bloody Version"); 4:52 (Album version)
- Label: Wu-Tang; Loud
- Songwriter: Wu-Tang Clan
- Producer: Prince Rakeem

Wu-Tang Clan singles chronology
"Protect Ya Neck" (1992)	"C.R.E.A.M." (1994)

Alternative cover
- 1993 re-release

Music video
- "Protect Ya Neck" on YouTube

"Protect Ya Neck" is the debut single by American hip hop group Wu-Tang Clan, originally released on December 14, 1992, through Wu-Tang Records and later re-released May 3, 1993 through Loud Records. The song appears on the group's debut studio album Enter the Wu-Tang (36 Chambers). It was produced by RZA and features eight of the original nine Wu-Tang members.

== Background and composition ==
"Protect Ya Neck", along with "Tearz", were the first tracks recorded by the Wu-Tang Clan, released independently by the group as a 12-inch single in 1992. "Protect Ya Neck" is a free-associative and braggadocious battle rap and was the first Wu-Tang song bringing together the original four members and four others (excluding Masta Killa, who had not yet joined). The single was originally released by Wu-Tang Records backed with the B-side "After the Laughter Comes Tears". After it created an underground buzz, Wu-Tang Clan signed with Loud Records and re-released it in 1993, with "Method Man" as the B-side, which sold 10,000 copies.

The album version of the song (even explicit versions of the album) is edited to scratch out all profanity, save for use of the word "nigga". The song was originally recorded over a different beat and the verses in a different order before producer RZA decided to rearrange them and change the beat. The person who calls into a radio station at the start of the song was from an interview Wu-Tang Clan did on Washington, D.C. radio station WPGC. Different segments of the same interview are placed at different parts of their first album, Enter the Wu-Tang (36 Chambers).

Rapper Grand Daddy I.U. noted the swipe that GZA took at him on the song. Prior to the formation of the Wu-Tang Clan, GZA was originally known as The Genius – who, along with Grand Daddy I.U. – was signed to Cold Chillin' Records. GZA's verse was directed at his former label for lack of promotion over his debut Words from the Genius in favor of the former's debut album Smooth Assassin. Aside from the swipes at his former label, GZA also took a few swipes at I.U., to which I.U. discussed in 2006:

I was wearing the suit and tie shit back then on some old time gangster shit. He had that other shit like, ‘Girl come do me.’ I guess they wasn’t feeling that shit so they chose to push me harder than they pushed him. That ain’t my fault what the fuck are you mad at me for? So you know how that shit is. He ain’t gonna come to my face and say nothing so later on he put that shit in his little rhyme or whatever throwing a subliminal jab. That shit is neither here nor there.

"Protect Ya Neck" is featured on greatest hits compilations such as The RZA Hits, Disciples of the 36 Chambers and Legend of the Wu-Tang: Wu-Tang Clan's Greatest Hits, which contains the original, uncensored version known as the "Bloody Version". On his debut solo album, Return to the 36 Chambers: The Dirty Version, clan member Ol' Dirty Bastard would release a sequel track titled "Protect Ya Neck II the Zoo" featuring members of his own Brooklyn Zu rap collective. In 2000, Wu-Tang Clan would also release a sequel on their third album The W, called "Protect Ya Neck (The Jump Off)", which also features Cappadonna and Masta Killa in place of the then-incarcerated Ol' Dirty Bastard.

The "Protect Ya Neck / Method Man" single made The Source's 100 Best Singles list. In September 2010, Pitchfork included the song at number 5 in their Top 200 Tracks of the 90s.

== Music video ==
The music video features each Wu-Tang member in black and white rapping individually with their entourage in the background. As each rapper starts his verse, their rap aliases are shown on the screen. Many of these aliases are spelled incorrectly or never used on official releases such as GZA being shown as "The Jizah" or Inspectah Deck as "Inspektah Deck". In the video, occasionally clips of Wu-Tang as a full group in color are flashed for a couple seconds. It features a cameo appearance from a then-unknown Cappadonna during Raekwon and Method Man's scenes and Masta Killa is seen being chased by the rest of the whole clan during Ol' Dirty Bastard and GZA's scenes.

== Track listing ==
=== Wu-Tang Records release ===
Wu-Tang Side
No.	Title	Length
1.	"Protect Ya Neck" (Radio Edit)	4:37
2.	"Protect Ya Neck" (Bloody Version)	5:01
3.	"Protect Ya Neck" (Instrumental)	2:00

Shaolin Side
No.	Title	Length
1.	"After the Laughter Comes Tears" (Vocal)	3:17
2.	"After the Laughter Comes Tears" (Instrumental)	3:17

=== Loud Records release ===
Side A
No.	Title	Length
1.	"Protect Ya Neck" (Radio Edit)	4:30
2.	"Protect Ya Neck" (Shao Lin Version)	4:36
3.	"Protect Ya Neck" (Bloody Version)	5:03

Side B
No.	Title	Length
1.	"Method Man" (Radio Edit)	4:15
2.	"Method Man" (Smoked Out Version)	5:02
3.	"Method Man" (Home Grown Version)	5:08
4.	"Method Man" (Bonus Beats)	0:57

== Personnel ==
Credits adapted from single's label.

Production

- Prince Rakeem – production, mixing, arranging

Additional personnel

- Robert Diggs – executive production
- Oli Grant – executive production
- Dennis Coles – executive production
- Mitchell Diggs – executive production

== Certifications ==
Region	Certification	Certified units/sales
New Zealand (RMNZ)	Gold	15,000^{‡}
United States (RIAA)	Platinum	1,000,000^{‡}
^{‡} Sales+streaming figures based on certification alone.
