= Mathematics (producer) =

Rap music producer

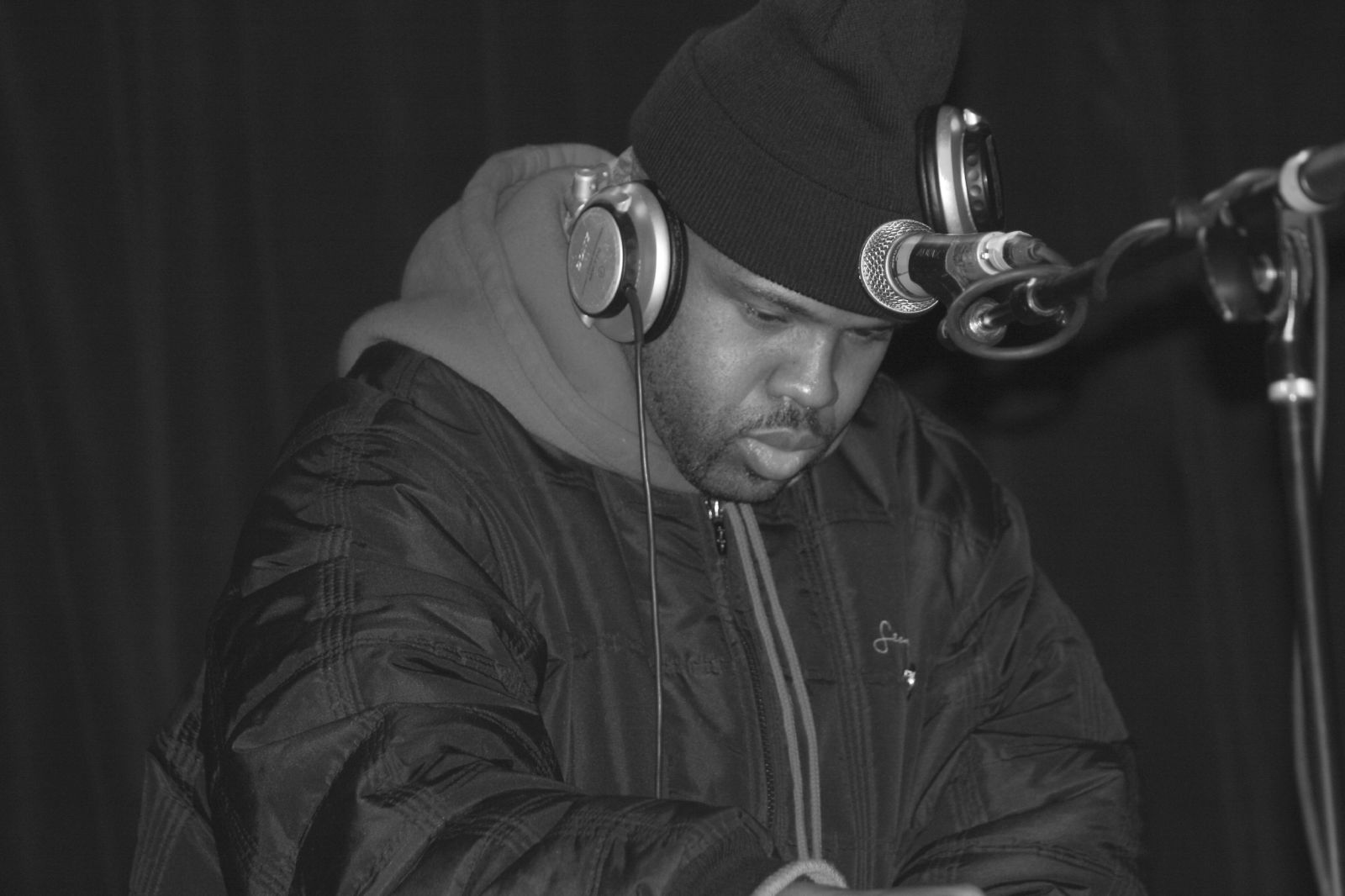
- Mathematics in 2017

Background information
- Also known as: Allah Mathematics
- Born: Ronald Maurice Bean; October 21, 1971 (age 54); Queens, New York City, U.S.
- Genres: Hip hop
- Occupations: DJ; record producer; graphic designer
- Years active: 1987–present

Ronald Maurice Bean, better known professionally as Mathematics (also known as Allah Mathematics) (born October 21, 1971), is a hip hop producer and DJ for the Wu-Tang Clan and its solo and affiliate projects. He designed the Wu-Tang Clan logo.

== Biography ==
As well as using rappers from Mathematics' home borough of Queens, Eyes-Low and Buddah Bless, Love Hell Or Right had appearances from all the Wu-Tang Clan members except GZA and the then-imprisoned Ol' Dirty Bastard. Mathematics soon signed to the popular independent hip hop label Nature Sounds (home to Wu-Tang colleague Masta Killa as well as MF Doom) and released his second album The Problem in 2005. On this album the entire Wu-Tang Clan appeared, including a posthumous appearance from Ol' Dirty Bastard. As well as working on his solo albums, Mathematics has continued to contribute beats to many Wu-Tang releases, including the first albums by Masta Killa and Streetlife. In January 2012 he was to release a sequel to The Problem entitled The Answer, entirely produced by him with Wu-Tang members such as Raekwon, GZA, Method Man, Cappadonna, Masta Killa, Ol' Dirty Bastard, Ghostface Killah. Other artists include Redman and artists he is developing such as Ali Vegas, Eyeslow and Bad Luck.

In August 2017, it was confirmed that Wu-Tang Clan will release a new album, Wu-Tang: The Saga Continues, which was entirely produced by Mathematics and was released on October 13, 2017. The first track off the album is titled "People Say" and features Redman.

== Discography ==
=== Albums ===
Album name	Release date	Status
Love, Hell or Right	August 26, 2003	
The Problem	June 28, 2005	
Soul of a Man	June 13, 2006	
Mathematics Presents Wu-Tang Clan & Friends Unreleased	February 6, 2007	
Mathematics Presents... Return of the Wu & Friends	February 16, 2010	
Prelude to the Answer	April 16, 2013	
The Answer	October 1, 2013	
Black Samson, the Bastard Swordsman	April 12, 2025	

=== Production credits ===
- America Is Dying Slowly - Red Hot AIDS Benefit Series, Red Hot Organization, Smoke One Productions
- NFL Jams - "Fast Life"
- The Pillage - "Oh Donna"
- Wu-Tang Killa Bees: The Swarm - "Cobra Clutch", "Punishment", "Fatal Sting"
- Dirty Weaponry - "Galactics", "Bastard Swordsman"
- Slam: The Soundtrack - "I Can See"
- Tical 2000: Judgement Day - "Snuffed Out"
- Wu-Syndicate - "Pointin' Fingers", "Muzzle Toe"
- Beneath the Surface - "Amplified Sample", "High Price Small Reward", "Publicity", "Feel Like an Enemy", "Mic Trippin’"
- Uncontrolled Substance - "Uncontrolled Substance"
- Blackout! - "Dat's Dat Shit", "Fire Ina Hole"
- Next Friday (Original Motion Picture Soundtrack) - "Shaolin Worldwide"
- Black Knights - "Street War"
- The W - "Do You Really (Thang Thang)"
- Supreme Clientele - "Mighty Healthy", "Wu-Banga 101"
- Digital Bullet - "Must Be Bobby", "Cousins"
- How High The Soundtrack - "Who Wanna Rap"
- Iron Flag - "Rules"
- Bulletproof Wallets - "Theodore", "Strawberry"
- Legend of the Liquid Sword - "Fam (Members Only)"
- Tera Iz Him - "Roll with the Rush"
- Bobby Digital Presents Northstar - "Duckie", "We Got It"
- No Said Date - "Last Drink", "Do That Dance", "Whatever"
- Street Education - "FANZ", "Who Want to Rap?", "Sweetest Pain"
- Wu-Tang Meets the Indie Culture - "Cars on the Interstate"
- 4:21... The Day After - "Dirty Mef", "Everything"
- I - "Two Missed Calls"
- 8 Diagrams - "Stick Me for My Riches"
- Pro Tools - "Pencil"
- Blackout! 2 - "BO2 (Intro)"
- Only Built 4 Cuban Linx... Pt. II - "Mean Streets"
- Pollen: The Swarm - "Assed Out"
- Wu-Massacre - "Meth vs. Chef Part II", "Miranda", "Dangerous"
- Heaven Razah - "Raised in Hell"
- Shaolin vs. Wu-Tang - "Dart School"
- Gold Cobra - "Middle Finger", "Combat Jazz"
- Selling My Soul - "Intro", "Part 2", "All Natural", "Wisdom"
- The Saga Continues - entire album
- The Meth Lab - "The Pledge"', "2 Minutes of Your Time"
- Slime Wave - "Ghost of Camay"
- Black Samson, the Bastard Swordsman - entire album
