= Gravel Pit =

2000 single by Wu-Tang Clan

Single by Wu-Tang Clan featuring Paulissa Moorman

from the album The W
- Released: December 5, 2000
- Recorded: 1999–2000
- Genre: East coast hip hop
- Length: 4:51 (album version); 4:35 (single version); 3:54 (radio edit)
- Label: Loud; Sony
- Producer: RZA

Wu-Tang Clan singles chronology
"Protect Ya Neck (The Jump Off)" (2000)	"Gravel Pit" (2000)	"Careful (Click, Click)" (2001)

"Gravel Pit" is a single released by the Wu-Tang Clan featuring Paulissa Moorman and Dave Pendlebury for their album The W. It was not as popular in the U.S. as other Wu-Tang Clan singles like "C.R.E.A.M." and "Uzi (Pinky Ring)". It did, however, receive major radio play, and topped the music video show 106 and Park for two weeks straight. It is also the Wu-Tang's only Top 40 hit in the UK, peaking at number six. In October 2011, NME placed it at number 116 on its list "150 Best Tracks of the Past 15 Years".

The chorus of the song: "Back, back and forth and forth..." is taken from the funk group Cameo's single "Back And Forth". The hook of the song: "Check out my gravel pit..." is sung by Paulissa Moorman. According to The Wu-Tang Manual the beat for the track was sampled from Antoine Duhamel's soundtrack to a French TV miniseries entitled Belphegor.

RZA has stated that he originally wanted Aaliyah to record the song, but was unable to arrange it before her death, leading to the Wu Tang Clan recording it. The song features verses from three of the Wu-Tang Clan's MCs, Method Man, Ghostface Killah and U-God, as well as spoken bits from RZA and Raekwon.

== Music video ==
The music video, directed by Joseph Kahn, features the Wu-Tang Clan arguing in their elevator-like time machine, and in argument accidentally sending themselves back to "2,000,000 BC", even though Method Man claimed they were going back to 2000 B.C. "2,000,000 BC" bears strong resemblance to the representation of the Stone Age in The Flintstones, mainly the recent movie. The "gravel pit" is a large, fancy pit made from stone and bones. The "pit", a casino, contains a fountain, Stone Age cars, dancing women - including the actress Tamala Jones, credited as "Crystal Diamonds" - and large dinosaurs. It appears to be ruled by the Wu-Tang Clan (with the exception of Ol' Dirty Bastard, who was incarcerated at the time - he "appears" as a pair of enchained arms hanging out of a makeshift jail cell), who now have "stone age" personas and clothing. At the end of the video "Bo Rockhard" (Bokeem Woodbine), a rival ninja, challenges the Wu-Tang ninjas, RZA leads ninjas and fights off a horde of rival ninjas attacking the pit. The track's ending soundbite (as well as many found on the album) comes from the movie Short Eyes.

Each Wu-Tang member adopts a different name in the video. RZA becomes "Bobby Boulders", Meth is "Joe Quarry", Ol' Dirty Bastard becomes "Ol' Dirty Blocks", Ghostface is renamed "Frank Stoney", Raekwon is "Lex Rockhead", and U-God is "Stonefingers".

== Samples ==
The song uses two samples. The trumpet introduction comes from "It's a Man's Man's Man's World" by James Brown, while the sample running along the whole song is taken from the French TV miniseries Belphegor's main titles. It also took samples from the films Enter the Dragon and Short Eyes.

== Charts ==
=== Weekly charts ===
Chart (2000–2001)	Peak position
Australia (ARIA)	35
Australian Urban (ARIA) With "Protect Ya Neck"	10
Austria (Ö3 Austria Top 40)	23
Belgium (Ultratop 50 Flanders)	7
Belgium (Ultratop 50 Wallonia)	34
Europe (Eurochart Hot 100 Singles)	14
France (SNEP)	95
Germany (GfK)	5
Holland (Eurochart Hot 100 Singles)	6
Iceland (Dagblaðið Vísir Top 20)	8
Netherlands (Dutch Top 40)	6
Netherlands (Single Top 100)	6
Norway (VG-lista)	20
Scotland Singles (OCC)	9
Sweden (Sverigetopplistan)	51
Switzerland (Schweizer Hitparade)	9
UK Singles (OCC)	6
UK Hip Hop/R&B (OCC)	1
US Hot R&B/Hip-Hop Songs (Billboard)	70
US Hot Rap Songs (Billboard)	20
US Rhythmic Airplay (Billboard)	34

=== Year-end charts ===
Chart (2001)	Position
Belgium (Ultratop Flanders)	40
Canada (Nielsen SoundScan)	196
Europe (Eurochart Hot 100)	70
Germany (Official German Charts)	40
Netherlands (Dutch Top 40)	97
Netherlands (Single Top 100)	82
Switzerland (Schweizer Hitparade)	76

== Certifications ==
Region	Certification	Certified units/sales
Germany (BVMI)	Gold	250,000^{^}
New Zealand (RMNZ)	Gold	15,000^{‡}
United Kingdom (BPI)	Platinum	600,000^{‡}
United States (RIAA)	Gold	500,000^{‡}
^{^} Shipments figures based on certification alone.^{‡} Sales+streaming figures based on certification alone.
