= Uzi (Pinky Ring) =

Single by Wu-Tang Clan

from the album Iron Flag
- Released: 2001
- Recorded: 2001
- Genre: East Coast hip hop, hardcore hip hop
- Label: Loud Records
- Songwriters: Lamont Hawkins, Dennis Coles, Robert Diggs, Corey Woods, Elgin Turner, Jason Hunter, Clifford Smith, Gary Grice, Clarence Reid, Russell Jones
- Producer: RZA

"Uzi (Pinky Ring)" is a song from Iron Flag, the fourth album by rap group Wu-Tang Clan. It was released as the album's first single, produced by GZA with an accompanying music video directed by RZA.

The song contains samples of “Parade Strut (Instrumental)” by J.J. Johnson from the Willie Dynamite soundtrack and was listed as the 322nd best song of the 2000s by Pitchfork.

== Track listing ==
12"

1. "Pinky Ring" (radio edit) – 5:23
2. "Pinky Ring" (instrumental) – 5:23
3. "Pinky Ring" (dirty) – 5:23
4. "Pinky Ring" (late night mix) – 5:23
5. "Pinky Ring" (a cappella) – 4:09

Promo, vinyl

1. "Pinky Ring" (radio edit) – 5:23
2. "Pinky Ring" (instrumental) – 5:23
3. "Pinky Ring" (album version) – 4:53
4. "Y'all Been Warned" (radio edit) – 4:14
5. "Y'all Been Warned" (instrumental) – 4:14
6. "Y'all Been Warned" (album version) – 4:14
