= Method Man (song) =

1993 single by Wu-Tang Clan

Single by Wu-Tang Clan

from the album Enter the Wu-Tang (36 Chambers)
- A-side: "Protect Ya Neck"
- Released: May 3, 1993
- Genre: East Coast hip-hop; hardcore hip-hop
- Length: 5:50
- Label: Loud; RCA
- Songwriter: Wu-Tang Clan
- Producer: Prince Rakeem

Wu-Tang Clan singles chronology
"Protect Ya Neck" / "Method Man" (1993)	"C.R.E.A.M." (1994)

Music video
- "Method Man" on YouTube

"Method Man" is a song by American hip hop group Wu-Tang Clan from their debut studio album, Enter the Wu-Tang (36 Chambers) (1993). It was released on May 3, 1993 as the B-side of the Loud re-release of their first single "Protect Ya Neck". Produced by RZA, it is a solo song performed by the Wu-Tang Clan member of the same name. The song contains samples of "Sport" by Lightnin' Rod featuring Kool & the Gang and The Last Poets and "Functional" by Thelonious Monk.

A remix of the song appears on Method Man's debut solo studio album Tical.

== Background ==
"Method Man"
The song features a single member of the group on the verses (Method Man).

Method Man and RZA were at the latter's house when he produced the beats for "Wu-Tang Clan Ain't Nuthing ta F' Wit" and "Method Man". Method Man wrote his rhymes after hearing Michael Jackson's cover of "Come Together" by the Beatles, which he based half of the hook on. The "M-E-T-H-O-D" and "Man" parts of the chorus were respectively derived from "Method of Modern Love" by Daryl Hall & John Oates and "Music Man" by Masta Ace. His lyric "Hey, you! Get off my cloud!" was taken from Bootsy Collins and he was saying it as if the line was being sampled. He said "It just fit because we were talking about getting high."

In regard to the "torture" skit with Raekwon, Method Man stated it "was some block shit that we used to do because when dudes was snapping, a lot of personal shit would come out and dudes would get angry behind that shit. You'd be amazed at some of the mother jokes that come up. When you do it, you saying the most outlandish shit in the world knowing damn well nobody gon' really do shit like that to you. But it's funny at the same time, just some of the shit niggas think of." He added,

That's just something we can call our own. It started on the block. We would have movie night—this is when VCRs got big [and TVs were] really heavy—and we would get a bunch of dudes together with three dime bags of weed and we'd all smoke it and watch a movie on VHS. After the movie was over, dudes would still be high, so dudes start geeking and snapping on each other. That's where all that shit came from. We were just saying it off the top. We was just going in there, just whatever stuck. The same way with the rhymes. You go up in there and you spitting shit and if it didn't work, you had to go. Every now and then, you had that shit that just gelled so well ya had to keep it.

== Critical reception ==
The Source named "Protect Ya Neck/Method Man" among the "100 Best Rap Singles". Comparing the song to "C.R.E.A.M.", Mimi Kenny of Consequence of Sound described "Method Man" as "equally iconic but decidedly less somber", adding that it "gives us several important spelling lessons and forces us to consider which method of torture would be the least desirable, and the smoky tone and hilarious rhymes of the M-E-T-H-O-D Man himself show why he got a track to himself, named for himself. Save for both featuring Raekwon and Meth, they have nothing to do with each other, and yet the juxtaposition works perfectly."

== Music video ==
The music video was directed by Gerald Barclay. He had to film a second version after MTV deemed the first version to be "too raw". The video was shot at Liberty Studios. Although only Method Man was rapping on the song, all members of Wu-Tang Clan were together for the shoot. They all sat against a white background for a sequence that was shot at the studio.

== Charts ==
Chart (1993)	Peak position
US Billboard Hot 100	69
US Hot R&B/Hip-Hop Songs (Billboard)	40
US Hot Rap Songs (Billboard)	17
US Maxi-Singles Sales (Billboard)	28

== Certifications ==
Region	Certification	Certified units/sales
United States (RIAA)	Platinum	1,000,000^{‡}
^{‡} Sales+streaming figures based on certification alone.
