= Triumph (song) =

1997 single by Wu-Tang Clan

- European commercial CD release

Single by Wu-Tang Clan featuring Cappadonna

from the album Wu-Tang Forever
- Released: January 11, 1997
- Studio: 36 Chambers Studio (New York); Ray Parker Jr.’s Ameraycan Studio (North Hollywood, CA)
- Genre: East Coast hip hop; hardcore hip hop
- Length: 5:38
- Label: Loud
- Songwriters: Wu-Tang Clan; Darryl Hill
- Producer: RZA

Wu-Tang Clan singles chronology
"Can It Be All So Simple" (1994)	"Triumph" (1997)	"It's Yourz" (1997)

Music video
- "Triumph" on YouTube

"Triumph" is a song by the American hip-hop group Wu-Tang Clan, from their 1997 album Wu-Tang Forever. It was released as the lead single from the album on January 11, 1997. The song does not have a chorus, instead solely consisting of an intro and interlude by Ol' Dirty Bastard and verses from the other eight Wu-Tang members and associate (and future member) Cappadonna.

The song received critical acclaim; Inspectah Deck's verse particularly praised as one of the greatest verses in hip hop of all time ("I bomb atomically, Socrates' philosophies and hypotheses / Can't define how I be dropping these mockeries / Lyrically perform armed robbery / Flee with the lottery, possibly they spotted me").

== Release ==
In a May 2005 interview, RZA discussed difficulties caused by the song's nearly six-minute length:

When I did "Triumph", radio and video stations was telling me it was too long, I had to edit it. I told them "take it as is or they wont get nothing", feel me? Next thing you know, we did the impossible. We got a six minute song on the radio. Six minutes man, that's serious. It's unheard of, a six minute video, we taking it back to that.

== Music video ==
The song's music video was directed by Brett Ratner who, at the time, had previously directed other hip hop music videos, including "Tonight's da Night" by Redman in 1993 and "Nuttin' but Love" by Heavy D & the Boyz in 1994. In a 1997 interview with MTV news reporter Serena Altschul, Ratner revealed that Raekwon came up with the video's treatment. Joseph Kahn was the cinematographer. The video cost about $800,000 to make. The video begins with a fictional breaking news bulletin alerting of a massive swarm of killer bees converging on Manhattan via New York City's four other boroughs, Brooklyn, Queens, The Bronx and Staten Island.

A news anchorwoman then goes on to reveal that Ol' Dirty Bastard is atop a Manhattan skyscraper surrounded by police helicopters and police with guns drawn, ready to jump, with his finger on a detonator. The anchorwoman then mentions that there just may be a connection between these two seemingly coincidental events. Despite being mentioned, Ol' Dirty Bastard doesn't actually appear in the video. According to Brett Ratner, ODB was uninterested in appearing since he had no verse on the song, so he left the set before filming and a stand-in was used in his place.

Inspectah Deck is climbing on the side of the building directly beneath ODB. When ODB jumps off to evade police, Deck runs down the side of the building, reaches the ground, and catches him. As people are scrambling in the street below, Method Man and others ride on motorcycles through the chaos trying to outrun the fireball behind them. When he finishes rapping it explodes and Meth is flung far away. The killer bees are seen passing by them, and go down the sewers and arrive at Cappadonna's lair. U-God is seen in a burning forest, hanging on a tree with a few doppelgängers. The killer bees then travel across the water to an Alcatraz-esque prison, where they bust a hole in the wall in the shape of the Wu-Tang symbol. RZA is wearing artificial wings, and appears to be walking to the hole in order to jump out and glide to safety. Instead, he transforms into a swarm of bees and kills the guard. The scene switches to space, and GZA is watching over the Earth as an infinitely wise, God-like figure.

During GZA's verse, a brief scene from the 1915 film The Birth of a Nation is shown. He makes a gesture with his hands and sends the killer bees back down into Manhattan. They conglomerate to form Masta Killa, who is standing on a tower in the shape of the Wu-Tang Clan symbol. People gather around him as if he was preaching. He forms a spark in his hands that enters all of their eyes, symbolizing the exposure to "true hip-hop". He then fades away in the form of killer bees, who travel to a club, where Ghostface Killah and Raekwon are rapping and Quincy Jones and Kidada Jones are in the audience. After they finish, the crowd transforms into a mass of bees that travel into the sky, forming the W in front of the moon.

== Track listing ==
=== US release ===
- A1 "Triumph" (Radio Edit) – 5:38
- A2 "Triumph" (Instrumental) – 5:38
- B1 "Triumph" (LP Version) – 5:38

=== European release ===
Vinyl

- A1 "Triumph" – 5:38
- A2 "Triumph" (Clean Version) – 5:37
- B1 "Projects" (International Remix) – 4:00
- B2 "Triumph" (Instrumental) – 5:38

Two compact disc maxi-singles were also released; each with a differently coloured cover:

CD 1 (of 2) • Silver

1. "Triumph" – 5:38
2. "Wu-Gambino's" (Hidden Chamber Remix) – 5:07
3. "Triumph" (Instrumental) – 5:38
4. "Triumph" (Clean Version) – 5:38

CD 2 (of 2) • Gold

1. "Triumph" – 5:38
2. "Projects International" (Remix) – 4:00
3. "Diesel" – 4:30

== Certifications ==
Region	Certification	Certified units/sales
United States (RIAA)	Platinum	1,000,000^{‡}
^{‡} Sales+streaming figures based on certification alone.
