= Wu-Tang Clan =

American hip-hop group

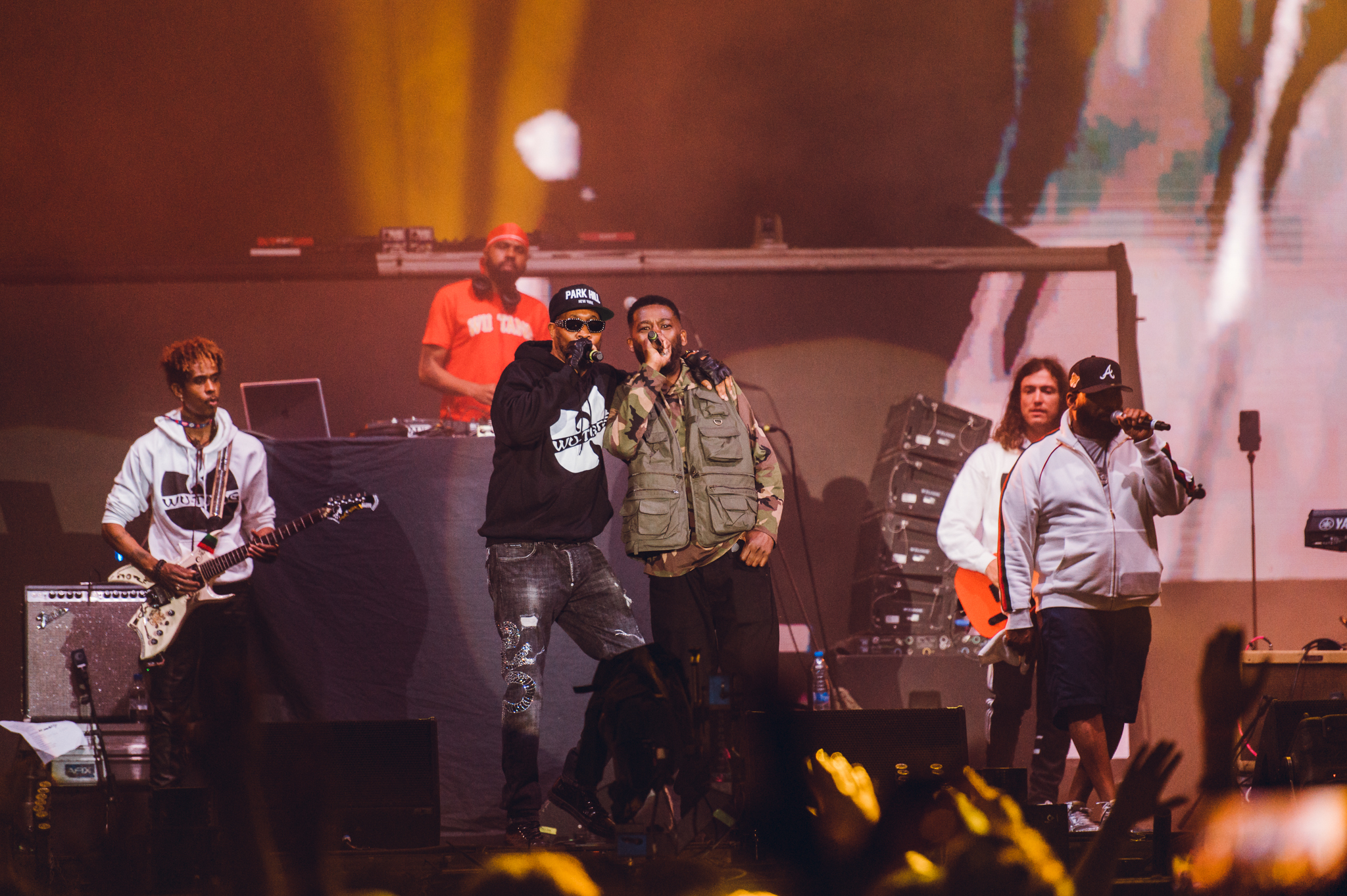
- Wu-Tang Clan performing at the Exit festival in 2023

Background information
- Origin: Staten Island, New York City, U.S.
- Genres: East Coast hip-hop; hardcore hip-hop
- Works: Wu-Tang Clan discography
- Years active: 1992–present
- Labels: Soul Temple; Loud; RCA; Columbia; SRC; Universal Motown; Asylum; Warner Bros.; BMG
- Spinoffs: Method Man & Redman
- Members: RZA; GZA; Inspectah Deck; U-God; Ghostface Killah; Method Man; Raekwon; Masta Killa; Cappadonna
- Past members: Ol' Dirty Bastard
- Website: thewutangclan.com

Wu-Tang Clan is an American hip-hop group formed in Staten Island, New York City, in 1992. Its members include RZA, GZA, Method Man, Raekwon, Ghostface Killah, Inspectah Deck, U-God, Masta Killa, and, until his death in 2004, Ol' Dirty Bastard. Close affiliate Cappadonna later became an official member. They are credited for revitalizing East Coast hip hop and are widely regarded as one of the greatest hip hop groups of all time.

After signing to Steve Rifkind's label Loud Records in 1992, Wu-Tang Clan released their debut album Enter the Wu-Tang (36 Chambers) in 1993; initially receiving positive reviews, it has since garnered widespread critical acclaim and is widely considered to be one of the greatest hip hop albums of all time. Members of the group released solo albums between 1994 and 1996. In 1997, the group released their second album, Wu-Tang Forever. It debuted atop the Billboard 200 and was nominated for Best Rap Album at the 1998 Grammy Awards. The group later released the albums The W (2000), Iron Flag (2001), 8 Diagrams (2007), and A Better Tomorrow (2014), to less popularity. The only copy of their seventh album, Once Upon a Time in Shaolin (2015), was purchased for $2 million by former hedge fund manager Martin Shkreli, making it the most expensive work of music ever sold. In 2026, the group were inducted into the Rock and Roll Hall of Fame.

Wu-Tang Clan has introduced and launched the careers of a number of affiliated artists and groups, collectively known as the Wu-Tang Killa Bees.

== History ==
=== Founding ===
In the late 1980s, cousins Gary Grice, Robert Diggs, and Russell Jones formed a group named Force of the Imperial Masters, later known as the All in Together Now Crew. Each member went under an alias: Grice as The Genius, Diggs as Prince Rakeem or The Scientist, and Jones as The Specialist. The group never signed to a major label, but caught the attention of the New York City rap scene and was recognized by rapper Biz Markie. By 1991, The Genius and Prince Rakeem were signed to separate record labels. The Genius released Words from the Genius (1991) on Cold Chillin' Records and Prince Rakeem released Ooh I Love You Rakeem (1991) on Tommy Boy Records. Both were soon dropped by their labels. They then adopted new monikers; The Genius became GZA (pronounced "jizza"), and Prince Rakeem became RZA (pronounced "rizza"). The Specialist also took on a new name and became known as Ol' Dirty Bastard.

RZA began collaborating with Dennis Coles, later known as Ghostface Killah, another rapper from the Stapleton Houses in Staten Island. The duo decided to create a hip-hop group whose ethos would be a blend of "Eastern philosophy picked up from kung fu movies, Five-Percent Nation teachings picked up on the New York streets, and comic books". Wu-Tang Clan assembled in late 1992, with RZA as the de facto leader and the group's producer. RZA and Ol' Dirty Bastard adopted the name for the group after the film Shaolin and Wu Tang. The group developed backronyms for the name (as hip-hop pioneers such as KRS-One and Big Daddy Kane did with their names), including "We Usually Take All Niggas' Garments", "Witty Unpredictable Talent And Natural Game", and "Wisdom of the Universe, and the Truth of Allah for the Nation of the Gods".

=== 1992–96: Enter the Wu-Tang (36 Chambers) and solo albums ===
"C.R.E.A.M."
"C.R.E.A.M." features two verses from Raekwon and Inspectah Deck, who discuss their upbringings while living in New York City. It samples the Charmels' 1967 song "As Long As I've Got You".

Following their 1993 independent single "Protect Ya Neck", Wu Tang Clan began to gain a sizable underground following. Though there was some difficulty in finding a record label that would sign the Wu-Tang Clan while still allowing each member to record solo albums with other labels, Loud/RCA finally agreed, releasing their debut album, Enter the Wu-Tang (36 Chambers), in November 1993. The album loosely adopted a Shaolin vs. Wu-Tang theme, dividing the album into Shaolin and Wu-Tang sections. The album received critical acclaim, and to date is regarded as one of the greatest hip hop albums of all time. The success of their debut album established the group as a creative and influential force in the 1990s, allowing individual members to negotiate solo contracts. RZA spoke on the Wu-Tang Clan's unorthodox business model:

We reinvented the way hip hop was structured, and what I mean is, you have a group signed to a label, yet the infrastructure of our deal was like anyone else's [...] We still could negotiate with any label we wanted, like Meth went with Def Jam, Rae stayed with Loud, Ghost went with Sony, GZA went with Geffen Records, feel me? [...] And all these labels still put "Razor Sharp Records" on the credits [...] Wu Tang was a financial movement. So what do you wanna diversify...? [...] Your assets?

— RZA

In 1994, RZA founded the group Gravediggaz with Prince Paul, Frukwan (both of Stetsasonic) and Poetic. In August of the same year, the group released 6 Feet Deep, which became one of the best known works to emerge from the horrorcore subgenre.

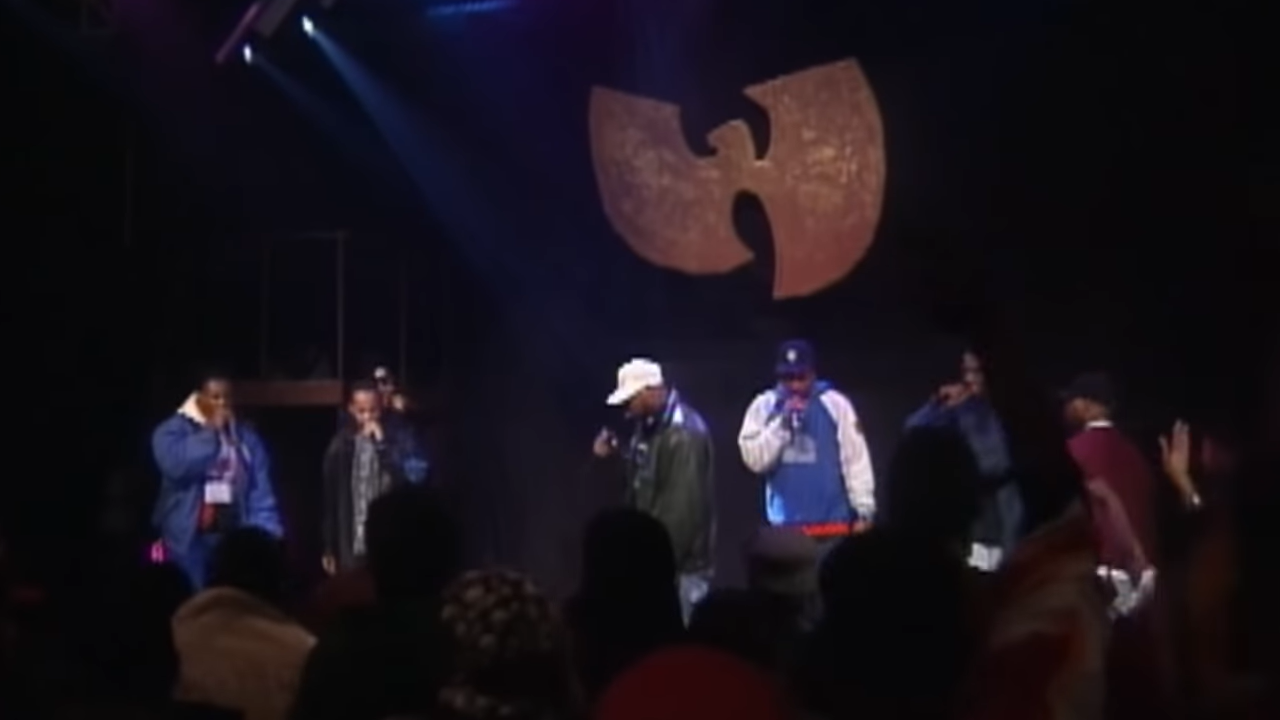
Wu-Tang Clan performing in the mid-90s

RZA held the role of primary producer for the first wave of the group members' solo albums, producing out of his basement studio in Staten Island. In November 1994, Method Man's debut album, Tical, was released. RZA's hands-on approach to Tical extended beyond his merely creating the beats to devising song concepts and structures. The track "All I Need" from Tical was the winner of the "Best Rap Performance by a Duo or Group" at the 1995 Grammy Awards. Ol' Dirty Bastard's debut album, Return to the 36 Chambers: The Dirty Version, was released in March 1995, and is considered a hip hop classic. Raekwon's debut studio album, Only Built 4 Cuban Linx..., was released in August 1995. It featured all but one member of the Wu-Tang Clan, and featured the debut of Cappadonna, who later joined the group. The album is also credited with reviving the mafioso rap subgenre. GZA's debut album, Liquid Swords, was released in November 1995. Liquid Swords features guest appearances from every Wu-Tang Clan member, and is linked together by excerpts from the 1980 movie Shogun Assassin. Ghostface Killah released his first solo album, Ironman, in October 1996. Ironman was critically acclaimed and is widely considered to be one of the best of Wu-Tang solo albums.

=== 1997–2000: Wu-Tang Forever, diversification and second string of solo albums ===
Wu-Tang Clan re-assembled and released their second studio album, Wu-Tang Forever, in June 1997; it debuted at number one on the Billboard 200. The album's lead single, "Triumph", is over five minutes long, features nine verses (one from each member plus Cappadonna and excluding Ol' Dirty Bastard who appeared on the intro and bridge), and no hook or a repeated phrase. The album was produced by RZA and his protégés True Master and 4th Disciple. The group's lyrics differed significantly from those of 36 Chambers, with many verses written in a dense stream of consciousness form heavily influenced by the teachings of the Five-Percent Nation. Wu-Tang Forever was nominated for Best Rap Album at the 1998 Grammy Awards, losing to Puff Daddy; Ol' Dirty Bastard infamously protested the loss by interrupting Shawn Colvin's acceptance speech for Song of the Year.

Killah Priest, a close associate of the group, released Heavy Mental in March 1998. That same month, Cappadonna released his debut album, The Pillage. Affiliated groups Sunz of Man and Killarmy also released well-received albums, followed by Wu-Tang Killa Bees: The Swarm—a compilation album released in 1998, showcasing these and more Wu-affiliated artists, and including new solo tracks from the group members themselves. The Swarm sold well and was certified gold. There was also a long line of releases from secondary affiliates such as Popa Wu, Shyheim, GP Wu, and Wu-Syndicate. Second albums from Gravediggaz and Killarmy, as well as a greatest hits album and a b-sides compilation, were also released.

The second round of solo albums from Wu-Tang Clan members included second albums from the five members who had already released albums, as well as debuts from all the remaining members, with the exception of Masta Killa. In the space of two years, RZA's Bobby Digital In Stereo, Method Man's Tical 2000: Judgement Day and Blackout! (with Redman), GZA's Beneath the Surface, Ol' Dirty Bastard's Nigga Please, U-God's Golden Arms Redemption, Raekwon's Immobilarity, Ghostface Killah's Supreme Clientele and Inspectah Deck's Uncontrolled Substance were all released (seven of them being released in the space of seven months between June 1999 and January 2000). RZA also composed the score for the film Ghost Dog: The Way of the Samurai, directed by Jim Jarmusch, while he and other Wu-Tang members contributed music to a companion "music inspired by the film" album.

The frequent release of Wu-Tang Clan content between 1997 and 2000 was considered by some critics to have resulted in an oversaturation that was responsible for the group's decline in popularity.

=== 2000–01: The W and Iron Flag ===
The group reconvened again for their third album, The W. Despite his incarceration in California for violating the terms of his probation, Ol' Dirty Bastard was on the song "Conditioner", featuring Snoop Dogg. Ol' Dirty Bastard's vocals were recorded via prison telephones.The W was released in November 2000, and was mostly well received by critics, and included the single "Gravel Pit". The album reached platinum status.

In 2001, Wu-Tang Clan released their fourth album, Iron Flag. While originally featured on the cover of Iron Flag, Cappadonna was airbrushed out of the artwork and largely absent from the album entirely. This may be related to tension that arose within the group when it was revealed that Cappadonna's manager was, or had been, a police informant, a revelation that also brought on the manager's subsequent firing. Cappadonna continued collaborating and touring with the group in the following years.

=== 2004: Issues and resurgence ===
In early 2004, U-God allegedly left the group. A DVD titled Rise of a Fallen Soldier was released detailing his problems, which were mostly with his treatment by RZA, who he claimed had hindered his success as a solo artist. U-God formed a group of young protegés called the Hillside Scramblers with whom he released the album U-Godzilla Presents the Hillside Scramblers in March 2004. The dispute culminated in a heated phone conversation between RZA and U-God on live radio, which ultimately saw the two reconcile. He has since returned to the group.

In 2004, the group embarked on a short European tour before coming together as a complete group for the first time in several years to headline the Rock the Bells festival in California. The concert was released on CD under the name Disciples of the 36 Chambers: Chapter 1. On October 26, 2004, the group released a greatest hits album, Legend of the Wu-Tang: Wu-Tang Clan's Greatest Hits.

==== Death of Ol' Dirty Bastard ====
Ol' Dirty Bastard's career was tumultuous. His run-ins with the law were well publicized—he was arrested several times for offenses including assault, shoplifting, wearing body armor after being convicted of a felony, and possession of cocaine, and he missed multiple court dates. In April 2001, he was sentenced to two to four years in prison. Once released from prison, he signed a million-dollar contract with Roc-A-Fella Records.

On November 13, 2004, Ol' Dirty Bastard collapsed at Wu-Tang's recording studio in New York City, and was pronounced dead later that night. Wu-Tang Clan paid him homage a number of times: in August 2006, one of his sons came out at a Wu-Tang concert at Webster Hall and rapped "Brooklyn Zoo", along with his mother, and during a concert at the Hammerstein Ballroom the Clan brought his mother out on stage for a sing-along to "Shimmy Shimmy Ya".

=== 2005–10: Solo albums and 8 Diagrams ===
In 2005, RZA released a book titled The Wu-Tang Manual. In the same year, U-God's second album, Mr. Xcitement and a collaboration between GZA and producer DJ Muggs, entitled Grandmasters were also released.

On March 28, 2006, Ghostface Killah released Fishscale, to much critical acclaim and some commercial success. The entire group, including Cappadonna and the late Ol' Dirty Bastard, appeared on the track "9 Milli Bros". The same year, Ghostface Killah released More Fish.

On June 25, 2006, Inspectah Deck released an album entitled The Resident Patient. Also released in 2006 were Masta Killa's second studio album, Made in Brooklyn, and Method Man's 4:21... the Day After. Ghostface Killah released his seventh full-length album, The Big Doe Rehab, in December 2007.

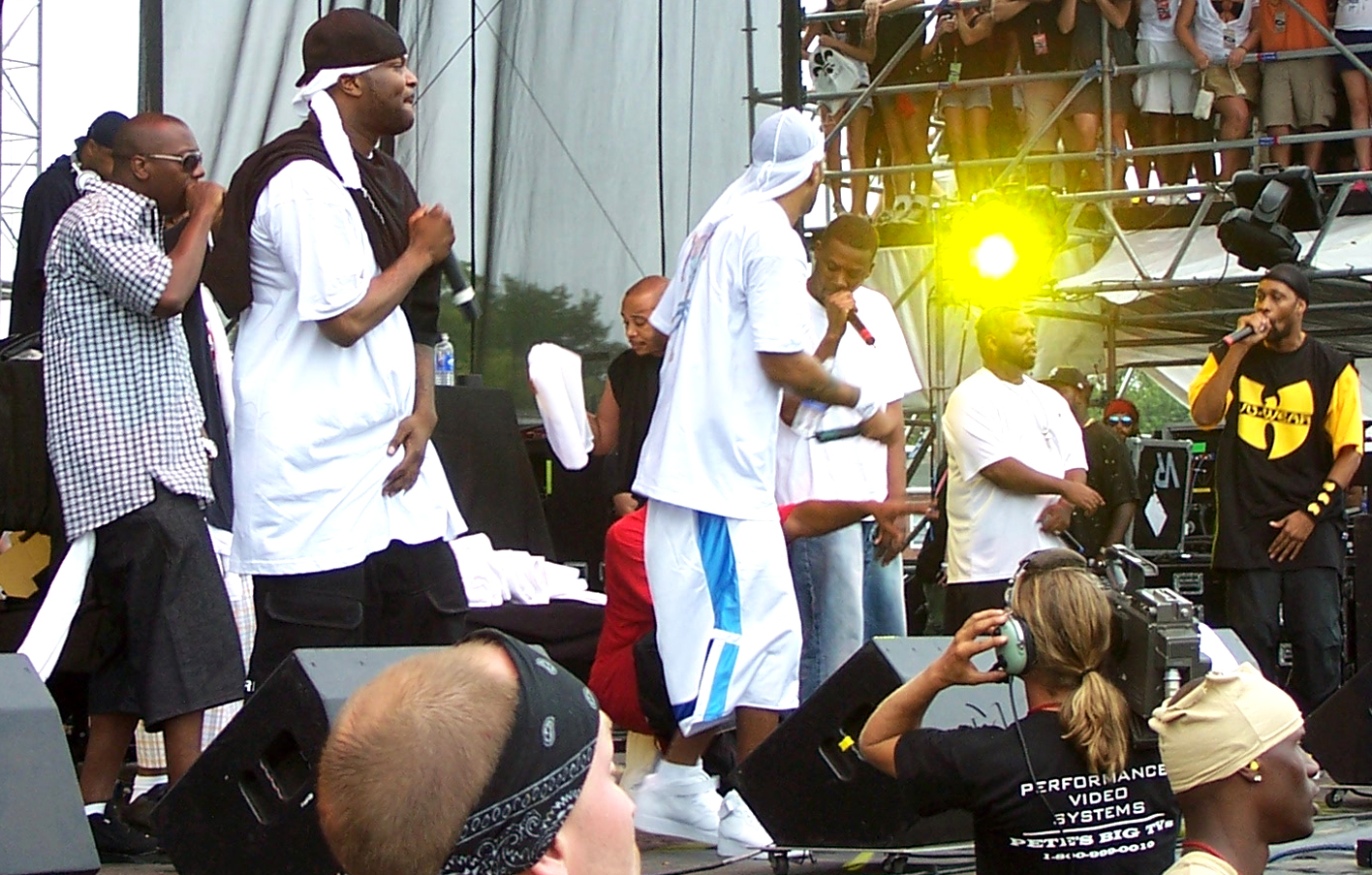
Wu-Tang Clan performing in 2007

In 2007, Wu-Tang Clan released their fifth album, 8 Diagrams, on Steve Rifkind's new label SRC Records. This album marked the inclusion of Cappadonna as an official member of the group. In an interview with MTV.com, Ghostface Killah stated that he was upset with RZA for starting the 8 Diagrams project while he was in the middle of writing and recording The Big Doe Rehab, as well as giving 8 Diagrams the same release date as The Big Doe Rehab, for which RZA rescheduled a release date one week later. The outcome of 8 Diagrams received mixed views from both fans and critics, and is regarded as being RZA's most experimental work to date. Raekwon and Ghostface Killah were unhappy with the album, and proposed recording a group album titled Shaolin Vs. Wu-Tan without RZA production. That album would eventually become Raekwon's fifth solo album Shaolin vs. Wu-Tang.

In 2008, RZA released Digi Snacks, under the name Bobby Digital. The album included lesser-known Wu-Tang Clan affiliates such as Freemurder, Killa Sin, Black Knights, and others. In the same year, GZA released the album Pro Tools. In September 2008, RZA announced that he had signed a deal with digital music company The Orchard to release the Wu-Tang Clan's back catalogue worldwide digitally, for the first time. In addition to forthcoming material, the Wu-Tang Clan's catalogue includes 13 previous releases that have been previously unavailable digitally, including recordings by the group as a whole, U-God, Wu-Syndicate, Killarmy, Shyheim, West Coast Killa Beez, Black Knights and others, and would be available online beginning September 23. RZA said: "The time is right to bring some older Wu material to the masses digitally. Our fans have been dedicated and patient and they're hungry to hear the music that has set us apart from so many others. Hip-hop is alive in Wu Music, and with The Orchard, we've got a solid partner that understands our audience and is committed to doing all they can to help us reach the fans. I'm definitely looking forward to working with them to see what else we all come up with. There's much more to come".

In 2009, U-God released his third solo album, Dopium, which features guest appearances from several Wu-Tang Clan members, and affiliates, among others, and was met with mostly lukewarm reviews. Wu-Tang Chamber Music was released in the same year, a side project executively produced by RZA, featuring live instrumentation from a Brooklyn soul band The Revelations. The album features appearances from five Wu-Tang Clan members, along with AZ, Kool G Rap, Cormega, Havoc, Sean Price, and M.O.P. Its first single, "Harbor Masters" featured Ghostface Killah, Inspectah Deck, and AZ. RZA spoke about the album to Billboard.com: "I think the Chamber Music title is very fitting. This music is totally in the chamber, or in the mind-frame of Wu-Tang like in the [Enter the Wu-Tang (36 Chambers)] days. But it's not a Wu-Tang album. The whole Clan's not on this album. But it couldn't be in any other category but Wu-Tang".

Raekwon's Only Built 4 Cuban Linx... Pt. II was released in September 2009, which features guest appearances from several big-name artists, and Clan members, with Ghostface being the most prominent, and also production from RZA, Dr. Dre, Pete Rock, and J Dilla, among others. The album was initially intended to be released on Dr. Dre's Aftermath Records. The album debuted at number 4 on the Billboard 200 and at number 2 on the Top R&B/Hip-Hop Albums chart, and has been praised by most music critics. Several weeks later, Ghostface Killah released Ghostdini: Wizard of Poetry in Emerald City.

Talk of the album Shaolin vs. Wu-Tang re-surfaced in July 2009; originally planned as a Wu-Tang album without RZA's input. The project evolved to include RZA only vocally, with no contribution to production. Raekwon stated "[It'll] be alter egos challenging each other, really allowing RZA to fall back on the production and allowing us to give him a flashback memory to the things we know we need from the abbot [RZA]. We want him to be involved [with the album as an MC], but the concept was for him not to be involved production-wise". Speaking to MTV.com, Method Man revealed his, Ghostface Killah's and Raekwon's plans to record a separate album as a trio: "I don't want to say it's written in stone, but it's in discussion. I want some feedback from the fans to see how they would take that. RZA produced tracks, some other outside producers, of course, and we gonna have Wu-Tang members on the album, but it'll be a Rae, Ghost and Meth album". Soon after, Ghostface Killah cemented the details: the record, featuring other Wu-Tang Clan members, was to consist primarily of him, Method Man, and Raekwon. The title, as announced in three separate trailers (directed by Rik Cordero) promoting the upcoming release, is Wu-Massacre. Speaking on their willingness to complete the album, Ghostface Killah estimated the release date of the album to be the end of 2009 or January 2010. It was then announced that the album would be pushed back from December to March 30, 2010; the single, "Meth vs. Chef Part II", was released after the announcement. Produced by Mathematics, it is an update of the song "Meth vs. Chef" from Method Man's first solo album, Tical, featuring verses by only Method Man and Raekwon. It had been confirmed by Raekwon that Shaolin vs. Wu-Tang would in fact be his next solo album and that Wu-Massacre is a separate album, while the rapper stated that he himself had petitioned to have Wu-Massacre's release date postponed in order to yield more studio time.

On February 25, 2011, Wu Tang Live At The Palladium NYC was released through the group's official Facebook page as a collectors digital download. This included exclusive, unreleased freestyles. It was limited to 100 downloads before the page was disabled after this figure was reached.

=== 2011–present: A Better Tomorrow, and Once Upon a Time in Shaolin ===
==== A Better Tomorrow ====
On June 29, 2011, Raekwon announced that the group were working on a new studio album, still in early stages. Ghostface Killah later said that the album would be released in May 2012.

Members went back and forth on the issue. While GZA hinted that a new album was unlikely, the RZA said a new Wu-Tang Clan album might happen after all, on the occasion of the group's 20th anniversary, though Raekwon doubted it.

On January 9, 2013, work on the sixth Wu-Tang Clan album was announced via the group's official Facebook page. In early March 2013 Method Man announced that the Clan was working on a sixth studio album and it would be released during 2013 in celebration of their 20-year anniversary since 36 Chambers. Cappadonna has said the album is in recording process taking place in New York, Los Angeles and the Wu mansion in New Jersey. RZA has also said he had talked to Adrian Younge about working on a song for the album. On April 11, 2013, it was announced via a press release that their upcoming sixth studio album would be titled, A Better Tomorrow and was set to be released in July 2013. During late April 2013, the Clan performed at the 2013 Coachella Valley Music and Arts Festival. On May 17, an unreleased Wu-Tang song titled "Execution in Autumn" was released for purchase through RZA's record label Soul Temple Records. They performed at the 2013 HOT 97 Summer Jam at MetLife Stadium in New Jersey, twenty years after they performed at the first annual Summer Jam concert. On June 5, 2013, the first promotional single "Family Reunion" featuring Masta Killah, Method Man, Ghostface Killah and RZA was released via the Soul Temple Records website.

In June 2013 RZA said so far every member of the Clan except Raekwon and GZA had put in work on the A Better Tomorrow album and that recording was being done at the Wu-Mansion, and the Wu-Mansion West. Unreleased verses from Ol' Dirty Bastard will also be featured on the album. He also stated he was hoping to release the album in November 2013. In July 2013 Cappadonna indicated the album was half way finished. Once November 2013 arrived, RZA gave an update on the album, saying that not every member had been significantly working on the album. He gave credit to Method Man, Cappadonna, U-God and Masta Killa for working hard on the album, while saying he needed more effort from Ghostface, Raekwon and GZA. Shortly after Method Man stated that Raekwon had not worked on the album at all, and Ghostface had only recorded two songs for the album so far. In late November, RZA suggested that the album was approximately six weeks from completion. In January 2014, the group posted a message on their Facebook page, saying: "The new Wu album 'A Better Tomorrow' coming soon." After several disputes between Raekwon and RZA about the direction of the group and album, they reconciled, with the latter agreeing to record verses for A Better Tomorrow. On October 3, 2014, it was announced that the album will arrive December 2, 2014, courtesy of a new deal with Warner Bros. Records. The album was released late 2014.

==== Once Upon a Time in Shaolin ====
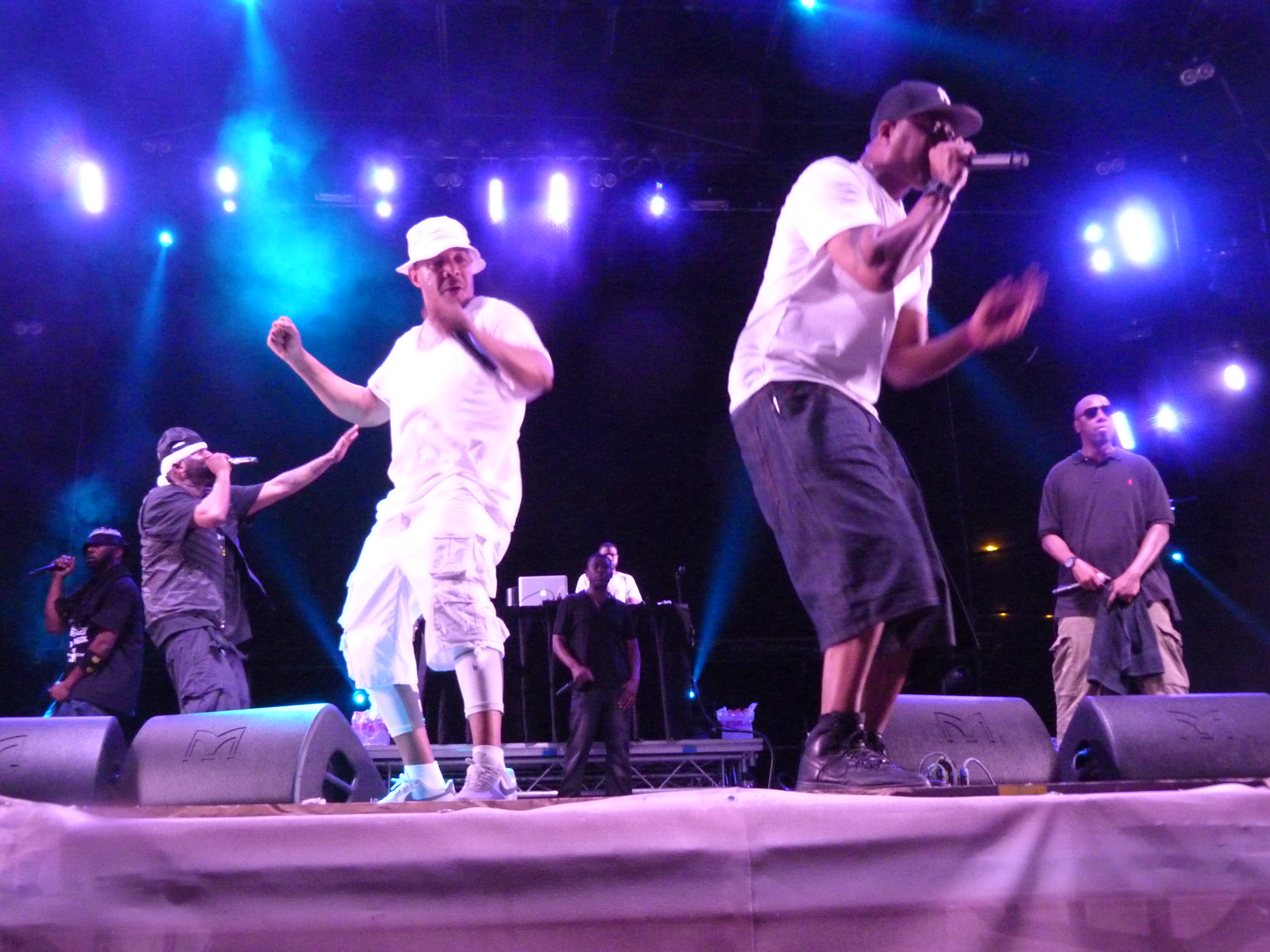
Wu-Tang Clan performing in Budapest in 2015

In March 2014 it was reported that in addition to work on A Better Tomorrow, a Wu-Tang Clan compilation album entitled The Wu – Once Upon A Time In Shaolin had been recorded, with Wu-Tang-affiliated producer Cilvaringz as the primary producer instead of RZA. The album, a double album consisting of 31 tracks, was not given a conventional commercial release and only one copy has been produced; the copy toured in museums, art galleries and music festivals before being sold at a high price to a single individual. In August 2014, a reporter from Forbes traveled to Marrakesh to meet Cilvaringz and hear a 51-second snippet of a song from the album, which featured Cher. The snippet was subsequently put on their website. The album is encased in a handcrafted silver-and-nickel box made by British-Moroccan artist Yahya and features never-before-heard music recorded over years. RZA stated he has been receiving multiple million dollar offers for the album. Despite the album's exclusivity it made an appearance in electronic dance music producer Skrillex's music video for his song "Fuck That" even though he did not purchase the project. The album was sold through Paddle8, an online auction house, for $2 million to Martin Shkreli. When the FBI arrested Martin Shkreli on December 17, 2015, they did not seize the Wu-Tang Clan album. Following the victory of Republican candidate Donald Trump in the 2016 U.S. presidential election, Shkreli broadcast excerpts from the album on streaming platforms Periscope and Hitbox.tv.

In July 2021, it was announced that the album had been again sold by the US government for an undisclosed amount (later revealed as $4 million), following Shkreli handing it over to the FBI in 2018 after being convicted of defrauding investors. The new owner of the album is the PleasrDAO group.

==== The Saga Continues ====
On August 25, 2017, Wu-Tang Clan released the song, "People Say", which featured Redman. RZA announced that the song would be part of an upcoming album, titled The Saga Continues. The album was released on October 13 under the name "Wu-Tang", as U-God was absent from it. The Saga Continues was primarily produced by Mathematics, and debuted at number 15 on the Billboard 200.

==== Las Vegas residency and Black Samson, the Bastard Swordsman ====
In December 2023, it was announced that Wu-Tang Clan would host "Wu-Tang Clan: The Saga Continues… The Las Vegas Residency" at The Theater at Virgin Hotels in Paradise, Nevada; in the process, they became the first hip-hop act to ever receive an artist residency. They started performing at the residency in February 2024.

On February 6, 2025, Wu-Tang Clan announced that they would release a new joint project with producer and tour DJ Mathematics, titled Black Samson, the Bastard Swordsman, on April 12 of the same year, in coincidence with Record Store Day. The distribution of the album, which was inspired by Blaxploitation movies and marked the first release to feature the entire formation of the collective since 2014, would be initially limited to 5,000 2xLP copies sold at participating Record Store Day retailers.

==== Final tour ====
On February 24, 2025 the group announced their final tour, "Wu-Tang Forever: The Final Chamber" with performance dates across North America from June through July of 2025. The final concert was held in Philadelphia on July 18, 2025.

== Members ==
- RZA (Robert Fitzgerald Diggs) – vocals, production (1992–present)
- GZA (Gary Eldridge Grice) – vocals (1992–present)
- Ol' Dirty Bastard (Russell Tyrone Jones) – vocals, co-production (1992–2004; his death)
- Method Man (Clifford Smith Jr.) – vocals, co-production (1992–present)
- Raekwon (Corey Woods) – vocals (1992–present)
- Ghostface Killah (Dennis David Coles) – vocals (1992–present)
- Inspectah Deck (Jason S Hunter) – vocals, production (1992–present)
- U-God (Lamont Jody Hawkins) – vocals (1992–present)
- Masta Killa (Jamel Irief, born Elgin Turner) – vocals (1993–present)
- Cappadonna (Darryl Hill) – vocals (2007–present)

== Artistry ==
=== Production ===
RZA's production was described by AllMusic as "consisting of stark, booming beats and chilling samples (heavily drawing from vintage soul records as well as kung fu movies)," summarizing it as "lean, menacing." According to RZA, he tries to have no more than 20–25% sampling on a record, something starkly different from many other major hip hop groups. He uses "the sampler more like a painter's palette than a Xerox. Then again, I might use it as a Xerox if I find rare beats that nobody had in their crates yet". He played much of the piano, with Bill Evans and Thelonious Monk as major influences; he created the piano part to "Da Mystery of Chessboxin'" after watching the documentary, Thelonious Monk: Straight, No Chaser.

RZA's production technique, specifically the manner of chopping up and/or speeding or slowing soul samples, has been picked up by producers including Kanye West and Just Blaze. West's take on RZA's style briefly flooded the rap market with what was dubbed "chipmunk soul", the pitch bending of a vocal sample to where it sounded as though the singer had inhaled helium. Several producers copied the style, creating other offshoots. West has admitted that his style was distinctly influenced by RZA's production and RZA has acknowledged his influence in an issue of Scratch magazine, saying he wished he had produced "Jesus Walks" and "Breathe", two 2004 hits produced by Kanye West and Just Blaze, respectively. Kanye West commented:

Wu-Tang? Me and my friends talk about this all the time... We think Wu-Tang had one of the biggest impacts as far as a movement. From slang to style of dress, skits, the samples. Similar to the [production] style I use, RZA has been doing that.

=== Lyrics ===
Raekwon's Only Built 4 Cuban Linx... helped (with the likes of Kool G Rap) popularize mafioso rap, which remained widespread for more than half a decade. The landmark album touted a lifestyle patterned on drug dealing, regrets of living in harsh conditions, and partying (including popularizing the Cristal brand of champagne) which Nas, Mobb Deep, Notorious B.I.G., Jay-Z, and other popular artists all borrowed and/or expanded upon these themes at points in their respective careers.

The Wu-Tang Clan's slang has long been a staple of their music, wherein members would blend Five Percenter concepts, themes from kung fu and other martial arts, as well as comic books and street slang to create their own nicknames for actions, people, places, and things (such as the christening of Staten Island as "Shaolin Land" and money as "C.R.E.A.M."). RZA noted in The Wu-Tang Manual that Raekwon was the resident "slang-master" and responsible for a large number of the slang terms used by the group.

== Syndication ==
=== Video games ===
All nine original members of the group were featured in the game Wu-Tang: Shaolin Style, released for the PlayStation on October 31, 1999, as well as a special collector's edition controller. Ghostface Killah and Method Man play themselves in all three games in the Def Jam series Def Jam Vendetta, Def Jam: Fight For NY, and Def Jam: Icon. The video games also feature Wu-Tang affiliate Redman.

Method Man is an avid fan of video games himself and has publicly stated that he loves playing SOCOM online with other PlayStation 2 users, and is part of an online clan ("KMA/Kiss My Ass"). His SOCOM II name is "ICU". He has a fellow SOCOM player featured on a skit on his album 4:21... The Day After.

In Army of Two, main character Salem talks about Wu-Tang asking his teammate Rios who the best member is. Salem says it's RZA but he says Ghostface Killah is pretty good himself. In the ending cut scene, a reference is made when Salem says "Survey says?" and Rios replies "You're dead". The exchange referenced the lyric, "And the survey says? / You're dead!" from "Wu-Tang Clan Ain't Nuthin' Ta F' Wit", from the album Enter the Wu-Tang Clan (36 Chambers).

Several tracks by Clan members and affiliates such as Method Man, Ghostface, Cappadonna, Trife, DJ Mathematics and others were featured in the 2006 game Saints Row.

Afro Samurai, based on the TV series, was released in January 2009 for the PlayStation 3 and Xbox 360. Its soundtrack, like the show, was produced by RZA.

In June 2025, the group announced cooperative action RPG Wu-Tang: Rise of the Deceiver.

=== Clothing line ===
Oliver "Power" Grant was one of the first to move from music to clothes. The Clan's executive producer, Grant began making clothes in the early 1990s, with little success. But in 1995, after the platinum success of Enter the Wu-Tang (36 Chambers), manufacturers who earlier wouldn't extend Power credit saw the potential. He opened four Wu Wear stores, in New York City, Los Angeles, Atlanta and Norfolk, Virginia. The line was carried in Macy's, Rich's, and d.e.m.o, among others. Power says he earned $10 million in 1998.

Method Man was unhappy with the decision to bring Wu-Tang into the fashion world with Wu Wear, despite the brand being a major money-maker for the group. "When Wu-Wear started making shoes and sneakers and pants, it was shoddy material. I never rocked that shit."

"I'm going to bring out Dirty Wear," declared ODB. "A set of ready-worn clothes: 'Dirty Wear, for the girl who likes to wear her panties three days in a row.'"

In 1999, Nike released a Wu-Tang Clan themed dunk high. The shoes were produced in low quantities. Their rarity and popularity makes them very sought after, with reseller prices as much as $7,500.

A partnership between Wu-Tang and the Alife NYC clothing group took place in 2007 through 2008 for an exclusive series of custom sneakers, T-shirts, hoodies and other accessories for men and women. The collection was named "A Wu-Tang Life".

== Television ==
=== Documentaries ===
Wu-Tang Revealed, a GZA-directed documentary, promised to show behind the scenes of the Clan, has yet to be released.

U-God: Rise of a Fallen Soldier details U-God's side of the struggle between him and RZA circa 2004–2005.

Gerald K. Barclay directed the Wu-Tang documentary, entitled Wu: The Story of the Wu-Tang Clan, which premiered on BET on November 13, 2008. The documentary was released on DVD on November 18, 2008.

On November 10, 2009, a documentary on Ol' Dirty Bastard was released, entitled Dirty: The Official ODB Biography. The documentary features interviews and stories from his family members, Wu-Tang members, and affiliates, as well as old interviews with Ol' Dirty, and live performances.

Wu Tang Saga, starring Cappadonna and featuring footage of the Clan dating back to the early nineties through their most recent tours was released on February 25, 2010.

In May 2019, Showtime premiered the four-episode documentary series Wu-Tang Clan: Of Mics and Men. The documentary was created by Sacha Jenkins and tells a story of the New York-based hip-hop group Wu-Tang Clan from their earliest times to commemorate the 25th anniversary of the group. The series features interviews from all living members of the Wu-Tang Clan. A 7-track EP was released on May 17, 2019, one week after the documentary premiered.

On September 16, 2025, German television broadcaster NDR released the documentary Evil-E. - Eva Ries und der Wu-Tang Clan, revolving around the story of the group's longtime manager Eva Ries and her role in its rise to fame. The documentary contains many exclusive interviews and long-lost original footage from touring and recording sessions.

=== Wu-Tang: An American Saga ===
On September 4, 2019, Hulu released Wu-Tang: An American Saga, a fictionalized account of the formation of the Wu-Tang Clan. The drama web series was created by RZA and Alex Tse. In January 2020, Hulu renewed the series for a second season. In November 2021, the series was renewed for a third and final season which premiered on February 15, 2023 and concluded on April 5, 2023.

== Collaborators ==
The Wu-Tang Clan has a wide range of collaborators and associates. Close collaborators to individual members or the group as a whole include or have included mainly East Coast–based artists, including Redman, Mobb Deep, Busta Rhymes, Erick Sermon, Nas, Pete Rock, and others.

== Discography ==
=== Studio albums ===
- Enter the Wu-Tang (36 Chambers) (1993)
- Wu-Tang Forever (1997)
- The W (2000)
- Iron Flag (2001)
- 8 Diagrams (2007)
- A Better Tomorrow (2014)
- Once Upon a Time in Shaolin (2015)

=== Wu-Tang releases ===
Some Wu-Tang Clan projects have been billed under the abbreviated name "Wu-Tang," typically for compilation-style albums that do not feature all official Clan members or are not approached as full-group efforts. These releases credit all participating artists individually, regardless of whether they are core members or not.

- Chamber Music (2009)
- Legendary Weapons (2011)
- The Saga Continues (2017)
- Of Mics and Men (2019)
- Black Samson, The Bastard Swordsman (2025)

== See also ==
- List of Wu-Recording record labels
- List of Wu-Tang Clan affiliates
- The Nine Rings of Wu-Tang
- Holly Maniatty
