= RZA discography =

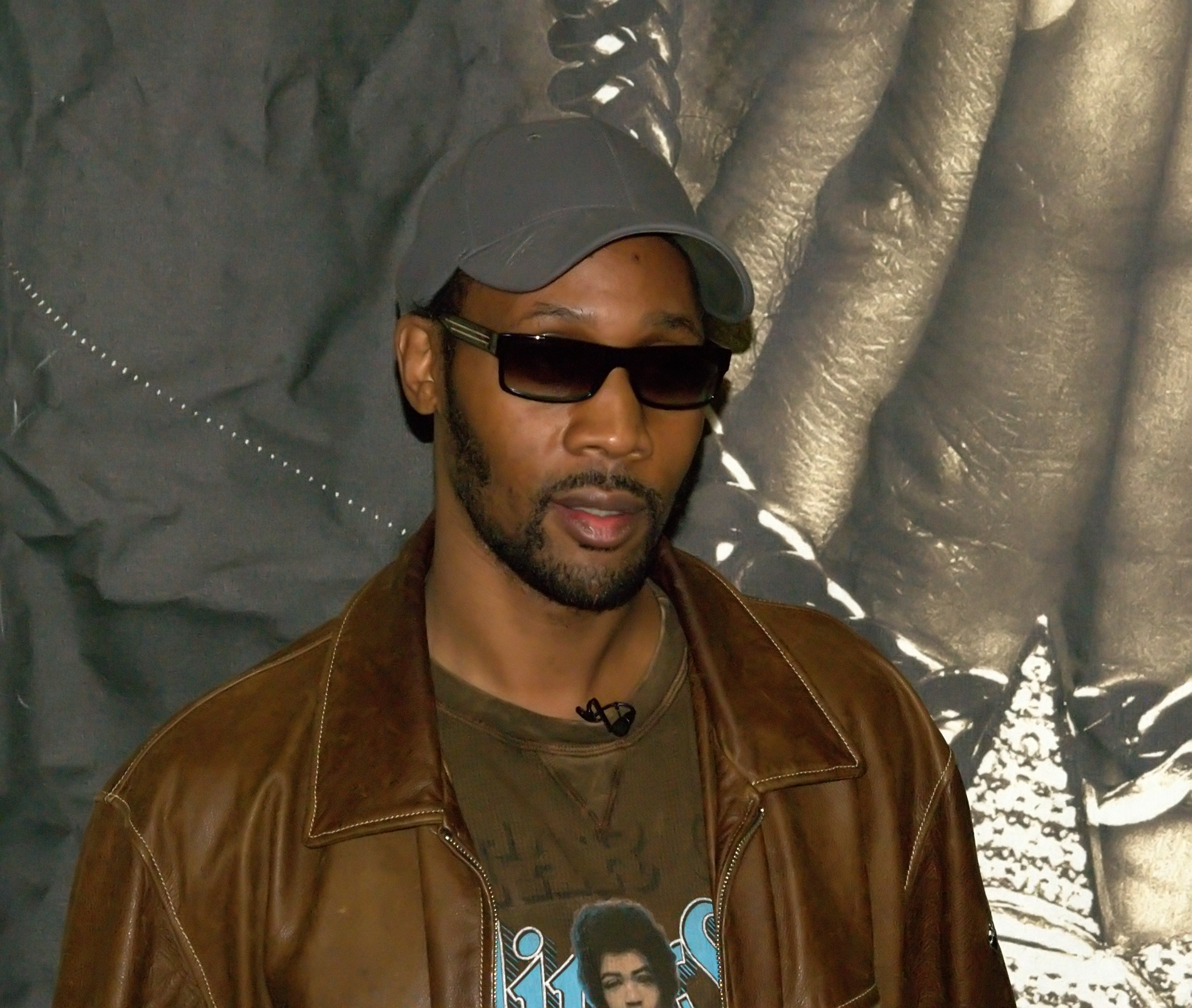
- RZA in 2009
- Studio albums: 4
- Extended plays: 4
- Soundtrack albums: 13
- Compilation albums: 1
- Singles: 11
- Collaboration: 1

The discography of Wu-Tang Clan leader RZA consists of four studio albums, two compilation albums, one instrumental album, four extended plays and five singles.

== Albums ==
=== Studio albums ===
List of studio albums, with selected chart positions, sales figures and certifications
Title	Album details	Peak chart positions				Certifications
Title	Album details	US	US R&B	US Rap	AUS	Certifications
Bobby Digital in Stereo	Released: November 24, 1998 (US); Label: Gee Street/V2/BMG; Formats: CD, LP, cassette, digital download	16	3	—	54	RIAA: Gold; MC: Gold
Digital Bullet	Released: August 28, 2001 (US); Label: Koch; Formats: CD, LP, cassette, digital download	24	9	—	—	
Birth of a Prince	Released: October 7, 2003 (US); Label: Wu/Sanctuary/BMG; Formats: CD, LP, digital download	49	20	—	—	
Digi Snacks	Released: June 24, 2008 (US); Label: Koch; Formats: CD, digital download	111	29	10	—	

=== Collaboration albums ===
List of collaboration albums, with selected chart positions
Title	Album details	Peak chart positions		
Title	Album details	US	US R&B	US Rap
6 Feet Deep (with Gravediggaz)	Released: August 9, 1994; Label: Gee Street/Island/PolyGram; Formats: CD, LP, cassette, digital download	36	6	—
The Pick, the Sickle and the Shovel (with Gravediggaz)	Released: October 14, 1997; Label: Gee Street/V2/BMG; Formats: CD, LP, cassette, digital download	20	7	—
Anything but Words (as Banks & Steelz)	Released: August 26, 2016; Label: Warner Bros.; Formats: CD, LP, digital download	186	—	11
Saturday Afternoon Kung Fu Theater (with DJ Scratch)	Released: March 4, 2022; Label: 36 Chambers/MNRK Records; Formats: CD, LP, digital download	—	—	—
"—" denotes a title that did not chart, or was not released in that territory.

=== Compilation albums ===
List of Compilation/Collaboration albums, with selected details
Title	Album details
The RZA Hits	Released: June 22, 1999; Label: Razor Sharp/Epic/SME Records; Formats: CD, LP, cassette, digital download
The World According to RZA	Released: April 28, 2003; Label: Virgin/EMI; Formats: CD, LP, digital download

=== Instrumental albums ===
List of instrumental albums, with selected details
Title	Album details
The RZA—Instrumental Experience	Released: December 18, 2007; Label: Think Differently Music; Formats: CD, digital download

=== Soundtracks ===
List of soundtracks, with selected chart positions
Title	Album details	Peak chart positions
Title	Album details	US
Ghost Dog	Released: April 11, 2000; Label: Razor Sharp/Epic/SME; Formats: CD, digital download	—
Kill Bill Vol. 1 Original Soundtrack	Released: September 23, 2003; Label: A Band Apart/Maverick/Warner Bros.; Formats: CD, digital download	—
Kill Bill Vol. 2 Original Soundtrack	Released: April 13, 2004; Label: A Band Apart/Maverick/Warner Bros.; Formats: CD, digital download	—
Soul Plane	Released: 2004; Label: Formats: CD, digital download	—
Blade: Trinity	Released: November 23, 2004; Label: New Line; Formats: CD, digital download	—
The Protector	Released: October 3, 2006; Label: Formats: CD, digital download	—
Blood of a Champion	Released: 2006; Label: Formats: CD, digital download	—
Afro Samurai: The Album	Released: January 30, 2007; Label: E1/Koch; Formats: CD, digital download	—
Babylon A.D.	Released: October 14, 2008; Label: Varèse Sarabande/Universal; Formats: CD, digital download	—
Afro Samurai Resurrection	Released: January 27, 2009; Label: Wu Music Group;E1/Koch; Formats: CD, digital download	—
The Man with the Iron Fists	Released: October 22, 2012; Label: Soul Temple; Formats: CD, digital download	31
"—" denotes a title that did not chart, or was not released in that territory.

== Extended plays ==
List of extended plays, with selected details
Title	EP details
Ooh I Love You Rakeem	Released: July 1, 1991; Label: Tommy Boy/Warner Bros.; Format: CD, cassette, vinyl
Only One Place to Get It	Released: May 14, 2014; Label: One of a Kind Studio Sessions; Format: Digital download
RZA Presents: Bobby Digital and The Pit of Snakes	Released: July 22, 2022; Label: 36 Chambers/MNRK; Format: Vinyl, CD
Bobby Digital in “Digital Potions”	Released: November 25, 2022; Label: 36 Chambers/MNRK; Format: Vinyl

== Singles ==
List of singles, with selected chart positions and certifications, showing year released and album name
Title	Year	Peak chart positions			Album
Title	Year	US	US R&B	US Rap	Album
"Diary of a Madman" (with Gravediggaz)	1994	82	57	8	6 Feet Deep
"Nowhere to Run, Nowhere to Hide" (with Gravediggaz)	1994	—	—	32	6 Feet Deep
"1-800 Suicide" (with Gravediggaz)	1995	—	—	46	6 Feet Deep
"Wu-Wear: The Garment Renaissance" (featuring Method Man and Cappadonna)	1996	60	40	6	High School High OST
"Tragedy"	1997	—	—	—	Rhyme & Reason (soundtrack)
"Dangerous Mindz" (with Gravediggaz)	1997	—	—	—	The Pick, the Sickle and the Shovel
"B.O.B.B.Y." / "Holocaust (Silkworm)"	1998	—	92	38	Bobby Digital in Stereo
"La Rhumba" (featuring Method Man, Killa Sin and Beretta 9)	2001	—	98	—	Digital Bullet
"Brooklyn Babies"	2001	—	—	—	Digital Bullet
"We Pop" (featuring Ol' Dirty Bastard and CCF Division)	2003	—	—	—	Birth of a Prince
"You Can't Stop Me Now" (featuring Inspectah Deck)	2008	—	—	—	Digi Snacks
"Gone" (featuring Kobra Khan, Justin Nozuka and James Black)	2010	—	—	—	—N/a
"Love and War" (as Banks & Steelz)	2016	—	—	—	Anything but Words
"Giant" (as Banks & Steelz)	2016	—	—	—	Anything but Words
"Who Needs the World" (as Banks & Steelz)	2017	—	—	—	Non-album singles
"Plug Addicts" (with Flatbush Zombies)	2021	—	—	—	Non-album singles
"—" denotes a recording that did not chart or was not released in that territory.

== Other charted songs ==
List of songs, with selected chart positions
Title	Year	Peak chart positions	Album
Title	Year	US R&B	Album
"So Appalled" (Kanye West featuring Jay-Z, Pusha T, CyHi the Prynce, Swizz Beatz and RZA)	2010	114	My Beautiful Dark Twisted Fantasy

== Guest appearances ==
List of non-single guest appearances, with other performing artists, showing year released and album name
Title	Year	Other artist(s)	Album
"Pass the Bone"	1994	GZA	Words from the Genius (Reedition)
"I Gotcha Back" {background vocals}	1994	GZA	Fresh (Soundtrack) / Liquid Swords
"Mr. Sandman"	1994	Method Man, Inspectah Deck, Streetlife, Carlton Fisk, Blue Raspberry	Tical
"No Hook"	1994	Shaquille O'Neal, Method Man	Shaq-Fu: Da Return
"As Long As You Know"	1994	Scientifik, Ed O.G.	Criminal
"Where Ya At"	1995	Ice Cube, Ice-T, Kam, Mobb Deep, Da Smart, Insane, Shorty, Smooth B, Chuck D, Killah Priest	One Million Strong
"Snakes"	1995	Ol' Dirty Bastard, Killah Priest, Masta Killa, Buddha Monk	Return to the 36 Chambers: The Dirty Version
"Cuttin' Headz"	1995	Ol' Dirty Bastard	Return to the 36 Chambers: The Dirty Version
"Wu-Gambinos"	1995	Raekwon, Ghostface Killah, Method Man, Masta Killa	Only Built 4 Cuban Linx...
"Liquid Swords" {background vocals}	1995	GZA	Liquid Swords
"4th Chamber"	1995	GZA, Ghostface Killah, Killah Priest	Liquid Swords
"Killa Hill Niggas"	1995	Cypress Hill, U-God	Cypress Hill III: Temples of Boom
"Assassination Day"	1996	Ghostface Killah, Inspectah Deck, Raekwon, Masta Killa	Ironman
"After the Smoke Is Clear"	1996	Ghostface Killah, The Delfonics, Raekwon	Ironman
"Marvel"	1996	Ghostface Killah	Ironman
"Who's the Champion"	1996	Ghostface Killah, Raekwon	The Great White Hype (soundtrack)
"Step Right In"	1996	Dog Eat Dog	Play Games
"Third World"	1997	DJ Muggs, GZA	Chapter 1: Soul Assassins
"Whatever Happened (The Birth)"	1998	AZ	Pieces of a Man
"The Chase"	1998	—N/a	Bulworth (soundtrack)
"The End"	1998	Ras Kass	Rasassination
"And Justice for All"	1998	Islord, Killa Sin, P.R. Terrorist, Method Man	Wu-Tang Killa Bees: The Swarm
"Hip Hop Fury"	1999	GZA, Hell Razah, Timbo King, Dreddy Kruger	Beneath the Surface
"Crash Your Crew"	1999	GZA, Ol' Dirty Bastard	Beneath the Surface
"The Anthem"	1999	Sway & King Tech, Tech N9ne, Eminem, Xzibit, Pharoahe Monch, Kool G Rap, Jayo Felony, Chino XL, KRS-One	This or That
"Belly of the Beast"	1999	Sway & King Tech	This or That
"Nigga Please"	1999	Ol' Dirty Bastard	Nigga Please
"'96 Recreation"	1999	Cappadonna, Ol' Dirty Bastard	Wu-Chronicles
"Nutmeg"	2000	Ghostface Killah	Supreme Clientele
"The Grain"	2000	Ghostface Killah	Supreme Clientele
"Stroke of Death"	2000	Ghostface Killah, Solomon Childs	Supreme Clientele
"It's Not a Game"	2000	American Cream Team, Raekwon	Black & White (soundtrack)
"4 Sho Sho"	2000	Northstar, Tekitha	Ghost Dog: The Way of the Samurai (soundtrack)
"Cakes"	2000	Kool G Rap	Ghost Dog: The Way of the Samurai (soundtrack)
"Samurai Showdown"	2000	n/a	Ghost Dog: The Way of the Samurai (soundtrack)
"Shaolin/6è Chaudron"	2000	Arsenik	Le Public Respecte
"He Lives"	2000	The Last Emperor	Lyricist Lounge 2
"Education"	2001	Remedy, Children of the World	The Genuine Article
"Cousins"	2001	Doc Gynéco, Cilvaringz	Quality Street
"Code Red"	2002	Remedy	Code Red
"Muslim and a Jew"	2002	Remedy	Code Red
"Killa Beez"	2002	U-God, Inspectah Deck, Suga Bang Bang	The Sting
"Doe Rae Wu"	2002	Ol Dirty, Kinetic 9	The Sting
"Rollin'"	2002	Black Knights	The Sting
"G.A.T."	2002	12 O'Clock, North Star, Shyheim, Solomon Child, Black Knights	The Sting
"Fam (Members Only)"	2002	GZA, Masta Killa	Legend of the Liquid Sword
"Bankstaz"	2002	Sunz of Man, 12 O'Clock	Saviorz Day
"Dangerous Language"	2002	Afu-Ra	Life Force Radio
"Bebop (live at the Rooftop)"	2003	Charlie Park	Bird Up (Charlie Parker Remix Project)
"Burn Bridges"	2003	9th Prince	Granddaddy Flow
"Tribute to the 5th Brother"	2003	9th Prince	Granddaddy Flow
"Da Great Siege"	2003	Mathematics	Love, Hell or Right
"Neckbone"	2003	Rockin' Da North, Cilvaringz, Elastinen, Ganz, Joniveli	Star Warz
"You Must Be Dreaming"	2003	Diaz, Baretta Nine	Velkommen Hjem Andres
"Can You Deal with That?"	2003	I:Cube	3
"What You Niggas Looking at Me 4"	2004	Black Knights	Every Night Is a Black Knight
"School"	2004	Masta Killa	No Said Date
"Old Man"	2004	Masta Killa, Ol' Dirty Bastard	No Said Date
"Digi Warfare"	2004	Masta Killa, U-God	No Said Date
"Intro"	2004	Method Man	Tical 0: The Prequel
"A Day in the Life"	2004	Handsome Boy Modeling School, AG, The Mars Volta	White People
"Fatal"	2004	—N/a	Blade: Trinity (soundtrack)
"Daywalker"	2004	Ramin Djawadi	Blade: Trinity (soundtrack)
"Head Rush"	2004	Pete Rock, GZA	Soul Survivor II
"The Sun"	2005	Ghostface Killah, Raekwon, Slick Rick	Put It on the Line
"Strawberries & Cream"	2005	Mathematics, Allah Real, Inspectah Deck, Ghostface Killah	The Problem
"I Love You"	2005	Thea	Derailed (soundtrack)
"All in Together Now"	2005	GZA, DJ Muggs	Grandmasters
"Advanced Pawns"	2005	GZA, DJ Muggs, Raekwon, Sen Dog	Grandmasters
"Biochemical Equation"	2005	MF Doom	Wu-Tang Meets the Indie Culture
"Unleash Me"	2005	Prodigal Sunn & Christbearer	Unleashed (Soundtrack)
"Intro"	2005	Sway & King Tech	Back 2 Basics
"Deep Space"	2006	Lord Jamar	The 5% Album
"Iron God Chamber"	2006	Masta Killa, U-God, Method Man	Made in Brooklyn
"Presidential MC"	2006	Method Man, Raekwon	4:21... The Day After
"4:20"	2006	Method Man, Streetlife, Carlton Fisk	4:21... The Day After
"In the Name of Allah"	2007	Cilvaringz, Masta Killa, Killah Priest, Shabazz The Disciple	I
"Wu-Tang Martial Expert"	2007	Cilvaringz	I
"The Weeping Tiger"	2007	Cilvaringz, Raekwon, Senna	I
"Afro Theme"	2007	—N/a	Afro Samurai: The Album
"Take Sword Pt. 1"	2007	Berretta 9	Afro Samurai: The Album
"Fury in My Eyes/Revenge"	2007	Thea Van Seijen	Afro Samurai: The Album
"Now That I'm Free"	2007	Outlines	Now That I'm Free / This World
"This Thing"	2008	La the Darkman, Method Man	Return of the Darkman
"Wu World Order"	2008	La the Darkman	Return of the Darkman
"If I Had a Gun"	2008	Brooklyn Zu, Monk	Chamber #9, Verse 32
"Don't Feel Bad"	2008	Styles of Beyond	Reseda Beach
"Pencil"	2008	GZA, Masta Killa	Pro Tools
"Life Is a Movie"	2008	GZA	Pro Tools
"Heaven"	2008	George Clinton	George Clinton and His Gangsters of Love
"Wrath of the Lamb"	2008	Shabazz the Disciple, B9	The Becoming of the Disciple
"Blood Thicker Than Mud"	2009	Reverend William Burk, Sly Stone, Stone Mecca	The RZA Presents: Afro Samurai Resurrection OST
"Whar"	2009	Kool G Rap, Ghostface Killah, Tash Mahogany	The RZA Presents: Afro Samurai Resurrection OST
"Brother's Keeper"	2009	Reverend William Burk, Infinite	The RZA Presents: Afro Samurai Resurrection OST
"Take Sword Part III"	2009	60 Second Assassin, Leggezin, Crisis, Christbearer, Monk, Tre Irie, Beretta 9, Reverend William Burk	The RZA Presents: Afro Samurai Resurrection OST
"Number One Samurai"	2009	9th Prince	The RZA Presents: Afro Samurai Resurrection OST
"Way Down"	2009	N.A.S.A., John Frusciante, Barbie Hatch	The Spirit of Apollo
"Electric Flowers"	2009	Nina Persson	The Spirit of Apollo
"Evil Deeds"	2009	Ghostface Killah, Havoc	Wu-Tang Chamber Music
"NYC Crack"	2009	Thea van Seine	Wu-Tang Chamber Music
"Intermission"	2009	DJ Muggs, B-Real, Planet Asia	Intermission
"Dollaz & Sense"	2009	The Black Keys, Pharoahe Monch	Blakroc
"Tellin’ Me Things"	2009	The Black Keys	Blakroc
"Smoke Like a Fire"	2010	Bliss n Eso	Running on Air
"Money Comes First"	2010	Masta Killa	MK Presents: The Next Chamber
"One Two, Here's What We Gon' Do"	2010	KRS-One, True Master	Meta-Historical
"War Zone (Remix)"	2010	Sunz of Man, prodigal Sunn, Timbo King, La the Darkman	Remarkable Timing
"You Must Be Dreaming"	2010	Kinetic 9	Pollen: The Swarm, Pt. 3
"Ghetto Serenade"	2010	Tekitha	The Prelude
"So Appalled"	2010	Kanye West, Swizz Beatz, Jay-Z, Pusha T, Cyhi the Prynce	My Beautiful Dark Twisted Fantasy
"Carry It"	2011	Travis Barker, Raekwon	Give the Drummer Some
"Start the Show"	2011	Raekwon, Jimi Kendrix	Legendary Weapons
"225 Rounds"	2011	U-God, Cappadonna, Bronze Nazareth	Legendary Weapons
"Only the Rugged Survive"	2011	—N/a	Legendary Weapons
"Robbery (Revelations Remix)"	2011	Reverend William Burk	Legendary Weapons
"3 Degrees"	2011	M-80, Solomon Childs	Taking Back What's Mine
"Fresh from the Morgue"	2011	Bronze Nazareth	School for the Blindman
"Carpet Burns"	2011	Bronze Nazareth	School for the Blindman
"The Fellowship"	2011	Bronze Nazareth	School for the Blindman
"Scot Free"	2011	Bronze Nazareth	School for the Blindman
"Different Time Zones"	2012	Wu-Block, Inspectah Deck	Wu Block
"American Royalty"	2012	Childish Gambino, Hypnotic Brass Ensemble	Royalty
"Baddest Man Alive"	2012	Black Keys	The Man with the Iron Fists (soundtrack)
"Just Blowin' in the Wind"	2012	Flatbush Zombies	The Man with the Iron Fists (soundtrack)
"thewaitaround"	2012	thenewno2	thefearofmissingout
"Beez"	2013	Kid Cudi	Indicud
"Take a Fall for Me"	2013	James Blake	Overgrown
"Drift"	2013	Blake Perlman, Ramin Djawadi	Pacific Rim (soundtrack)
Energy Work"	2013	Killah Priest	The Psychic World of Walter Reed
"Packets in den Boots"	2013	Genetikk	D.N.A
"Molasses"	2013	Earl Sweatshirt	Doris
"Unorthodox"	2013	Tony Touch, JD Era, Raekwon, Ghostface Killah	The Piece Maker 3: Return of the 50 MCs
"CPU"	2015	Raury	All We Need
"Return of the Savage"	2015	Ghostface Killah, Raekwon	Twelve Reasons to Die II
"Death's Invitation (Interlude)"	2015	Ghostface Killah	Twelve Reasons to Die II
"Let the Record Spin (Interlude)"	2015	Ghostface Killah	Twelve Reasons to Die II
"Life's a Rebirth"	2015	Ghostface Killah	Twelve Reasons to Die II
"Constant Elevation"	2016	Ras Kass	Intellectual Property 2
"Puppet Master"	2016	KXNG CROOKED, KinG!, The Observer	Good vs. Evil
"Numeric"	2017	Strick	risk=reward
"Let's Begin"	2018	Jon Bellion, Roc Marciano, B. Keys, Travis Mendez	Glory Sound Prep
"Godbody (Pt. 2)"	2018	Joey Purp	Quarterthing
"Lead Poisoning"	2018	Tom Morello, GZA, HeRobust	The Atlas Underground
"Why You Looking at Me?"		Ironkap	Nemesis 2
"Tomorrow"	2019	Jerome Hadey	Never for Money
"Like Children in Candy Stores"	2019	Jerome Hadey	JHADEY
"Rapapapa"	2019	Rich Brian	The Sailor
"Standing on the Frontline"	2019	Rev. Willy Burke, Weather Park	Thriller (Soundtrack)
"On That Shit Again"	2019	Ghostface Killah	Of Mics and Men
"Do the Same As My Bother Do"	2019	—N/a	Of Mics and Men
"Of Mics and Men"	2019	Cappadonna, Masta Killa	Of Mics and Men
"Fighting for Equality"	2020	Ghostface Killah	Cut Throat City (soundtrack)
"Breathe (Re-Amp)"	2021	The Prodigy	F9 (soundtrack)
"Porta One"	2022	Logic	Vinyl Days
“Cruisin’ Through the Universe”	2023	Logic	College Park
"12 Jewels"	2023	Burna Boy	I Told Them...
"Survive the Night"	2024	Lin-Manuel Miranda, Eisa Davis, Chris Rivers, Busta Rhymes, Ghostface Killah, Nas	Warriors
"Building with the Abbot"	2025	Matsa KIlla	Balance

== Music Videos (Featured) ==
Song	Year	Artist	Album
No Hook	1994	Shaquille O'Neal, Method Man	Shaq-Fu: Da Return
Where Ya At	1995	numerous	One Million Strong
Liquid Swords	1995	GZA	Liquid Swords
4th Chamber	1995	GZA, Killah Priest, Ghostface KIllah	Liquid Swords
Third World	1997	Soul Assassins, GXA	DJ Muggs Presents
Cake	1999	Kool G Rap	Ghost Dog (soundtrack)
The Anthem	1999	Sway & King Tech	This or That
It's Not a Game	2000	American Cream Team, Raekwon	Black & White (soundtrack)
You Must Be Dreaming	2003	Diaz, Beretta 9	Velkommen Hjem Andres
Old Man	2004	Masta Killa	No Said Date
Way Down	2009	N.A.S.A.	The Spirit of Apollo
Carry It	2010	Travis Barker, Raekwon	Give the Drummer Some

== See also ==
- RZA production discography
- Wu-Tang Clan discography
