= RZA production discography =

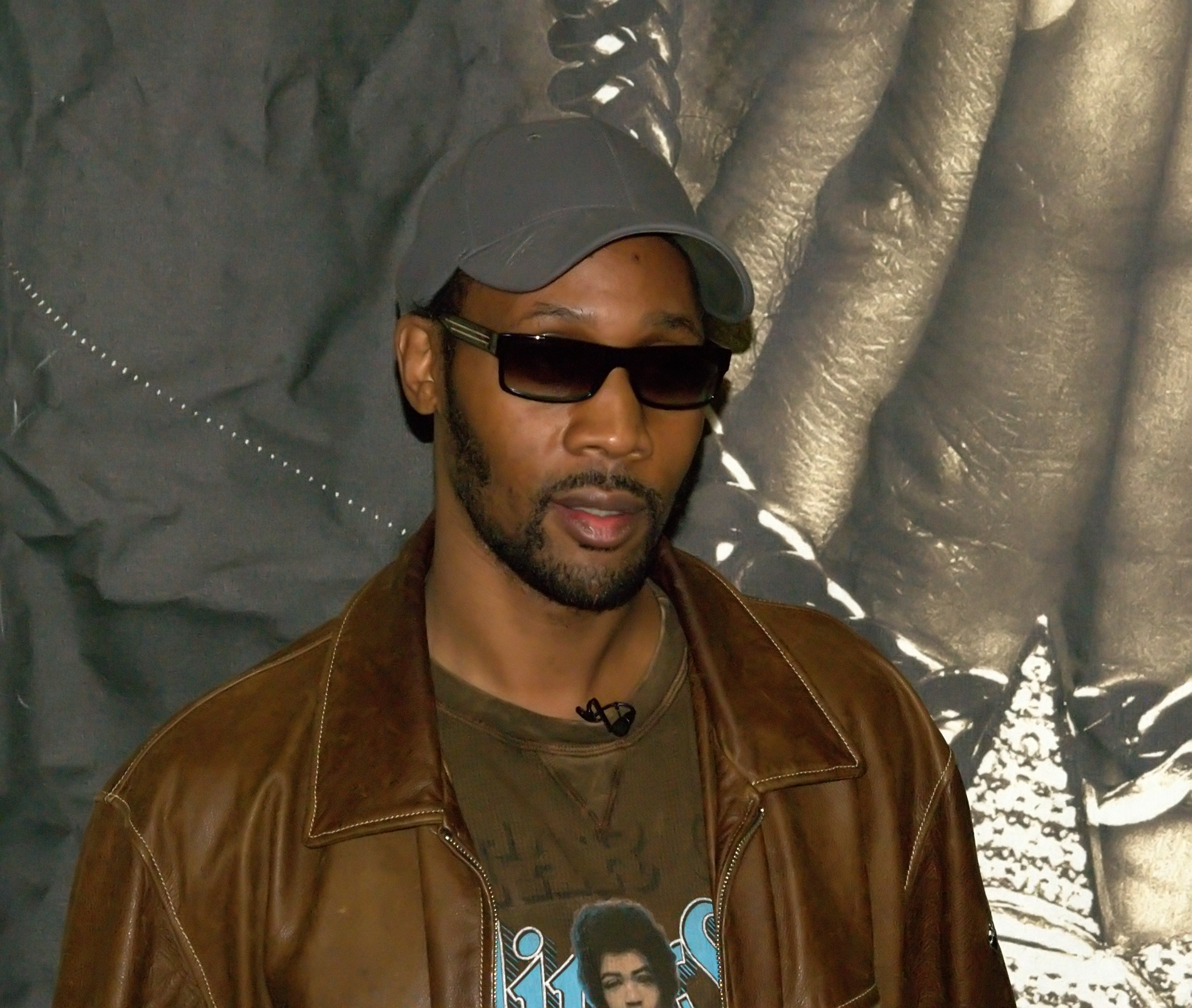
RZA in 2009.

The following list is a discography of production by American hip hop record producer and recording artist the RZA. It includes a list of songs produced, co-produced and remixed by year, artist, album and title.

== 1991 ==
=== The Genius – Words from the Genius ===
- 01. "Pass the Bone" (featuring Prince Rakeem) [released on 1994 re-issue version]
- 17. "Words from the Genius" (Prince Rakeem Remix) [released on 2006 re-issue version]

=== Prince Rakeem – Ooh I Love You Rakeem ===
- 01. "Ooh we Love you Rakeem" (Baggin' Ladies Mix)
- 03. "Deadly Venoms" (Vocals Up)
- 04. "Sexcapades" (DMD Mix) (co-produced with Easy Mo Bee)
- 05. "Sexcapades" (Wu-Tang Mix) (co-produced Easy Mo Bee)

== 1993 ==
=== N-Tyce – Hush Hush Tip / Root Beer Float 12" ===
- A1. "Hush Hush Tip" (feat. Method Man) (co-produced by 4th Disciple)
- B1. "Root Beer Float" (co-produced by 4th Disciple)

=== Wu-Tang Clan – Enter the Wu-Tang (36 Chambers) ===
- 01. "Bring da Ruckus"
- 02. "Shame on a Nigga"
- 03. "Clan in da Front"
- 04. "Wu-Tang: 7th Chamber"
- 05. "Can It Be All So Simple"
- 06. "Da Mystery of Chessboxin'" (co-produced by Ol' Dirty Bastard)
- 07. "Wu-Tang Clan Ain't Nuthing ta Fuck Wit" (co-produced by Method Man)
- 08. "C.R.E.A.M."
- 09. "Method Man"
- 10. "Protect Ya Neck"
- 11. "Tearz"
- 12. "Wu-Tang: 7th Chamber—Part II"

== 1994 ==
=== Gravediggaz – 6 Feet Deep ===
- 09. "Diary of a Madman" (feat. Killah Priest & Shabazz the Disciple) [co-produced by The Undertaker and RNS]
- 13. "Graveyard Chamber" (feat. Killah Priest, Dreddy Kruger & Scientific Shabazz)
- 15. "6 Feet Deep"
- 00. "1–800 Suicide (Poisonous Mix)" (feat. Blue Raspberry) [released on the 6 Feet Deep EP]
- 00. "Mommy What's A Gravedigga? (RZA Clean Mix)" [released on the Mommy, What's A Gravedigga? CDS]

=== Method Man – Tical ===
- 01. "Tical"
- 02. "Biscuits"
- 03. "Bring the Pain"
- 04. "All I Need" (feat. Streetlife)
- 05. "What the Blood Clot"
- 06. "Meth vs. Chef" (featuring Raekwon)
- 07. "Sub Crazy" (co-produced by 4th Disciple)
- 08. "Release Yo' Delf" (featuring Blue Raspberry)
- 09. "P.L.O. Style" (featuring Carlton Fisk) (co-produced by Method Man)
- 10. "I Get My Thang in Action"
- 11. "Mr. Sandman" (featuring RZA, Inspectah Deck, Streetlife, Carlton Fisk and Blue Raspberry)
- 12. "Stimulation"
- 13. "Method Man (Remix)"

=== Scientifik – Criminal ===
- 07. "As Long as You Know" (feat. Ed O.G.)

=== Shaquille O'Neal – Shaq Fu: Da Return ===
- 01. "No Hook" (feat. Method Man & RZA)
- 00. "No Hook (RZA's Remix)" [released on 12"]

=== Shyheim – AKA the Rugged Child ===
- 12. "Little Rascals"

=== Super Cat - Scalp Dem / South Central 12" ===
- A2. "Scalp Dem (Wu-Tang Mix) [feat. Method Man]

=== Various Artists - Fresh (1994 OST) ===
- 01. "I Gotcha Back" - performed by GZA {also on Liquid Swords}
- 02. "Heaven & Hell" - performed by Raekwon & Ghostface Killah {also on Only Built 4 Cuban Linx}

== 1995 ==
=== Cypress Hill – Temples of Boom ===
- 05. "Killa Hill Niggas" (feat. RZA & U-God)

=== GZA – Liquid Swords ===
- 01. "Liquid Swords"
- 02. "Duel of the Iron Mic" (featuring Ol' Dirty Bastard, Masta Killa & Inspectah Deck)
- 03. "Living in the World Today"
- 04. "Gold"
- 05. "Cold World" (featuring Inspectah Deck)
- 06. "Labels"
- 07. "4th Chamber" (featuring Ghostface Killah, Killah Priest & RZA)
- 08. "Shadowboxin'" (featuring Method Man)
- 09. "Hell's Wind Staff / Killah Hills 10304"
- 10. "Investigative Reports" (featuring U-God, Raekwon & Ghostface Killah)
- 11. "Swordsman"
- 12. "I Gotcha Back" {released 1994}
- 00. "Cold World (RZA Mix)" [feat. D'Angelo] [released on the Cold World CDS]
- 00. "Labels (Remix)" [released on the Labels 12"]

=== Method Man – I'll Be There for You/You're All I Need to Get By ===
- 03. "I'll Be There for You/You're All I Need to Get By (Razor Sharp Mix)" [feat. Mary J. Blige]

=== Ol' Dirty Bastard – Return to the 36 Chambers: The Dirty Version ===
- 01. "Intro"
- 02. "Shimmy Shimmy Ya"
- 03. "Baby, C'mon"
- 05. "Hippa to da Hoppa"
- 06. "Raw Hide" (featuring Raekwon & Method Man)
- 07. "Damage" (featuring GZA) (co-produced by 4th Disciple)
- 08. "Don't U Know" (featuring Killah Priest)
- 09. "The Stomp" (co-produced by Ol' Dirty Bastard)
- 10. "Goin' Down"
- 12. "Snakes" (featuring Killah Priest, RZA, Masta Killa & Buddha Monk)
- 13. "Brooklyn Zoo II (Tiger Crane)" (featuring Ghostface Killah)
- 14. "Proteck Ya Neck II the Zoo" (featuring Brooklyn Zu)
- 15. "Cuttin' Headz" (featuring RZA)
- 16. "Dirty Dancin'" (featuring Method Man) [CD bonus track]
- 00. "Give It to Ya Raw" [released on the Brooklyn Zoo 12"]
- 00. "Don't U Know, Part II" [released on the O.D.B.E.P.]

=== Raekwon – Only Built 4 Cuban Linx... ===
- 01. "Striving for Perfection"
- 02. "Knuckleheadz" (featuring Ghostface Killah & U-God)
- 03. "Knowledge God"
- 04. "Criminology" (featuring Ghostface Killah)
- 05. "Incarcerated Scarfaces"
- 06. "Rainy Dayz" (featuring Ghostface Killah & Blue Raspberry)
- 07. "Guillotine (Swordz)" (featuring Inspectah Deck, Ghostface Killah & GZA)
- 08. "Can It Be All So Simple (Remix)" (featuring Ghostface Killah)
- 09. "Shark Niggas (Biters)"
- 10. "Ice Water" (featuring Ghostface Killah & Cappadonna)
- 11. "Glaciers of Ice" (featuring Masta Killa & Ghostface Killah)
- 12. "Verbal Intercourse" (featuring Nas & Ghostface Killah)
- 13. "Wisdom Body" (featuring Ghostface Killah)
- 14. "Spot Rusherz"
- 15. "Ice Cream" (featuring Method Man, Ghostface Killah & Cappadonna)
- 16. "Wu-Gambinos" (featuring Method Man, RZA, Masta Killa & Ghostface Killah)
- 17. "Heaven & Hell" (featuring Ghostface Killah)
- 18. "North Star (Jewels)" (feat. Ol' Dirty Bastard) [CD bonus track] {released 1994}

=== Tricky / Gravediggaz – The Hell E.P. ===
- 03. "Psychosis" (co-produced by Tricky)-
- 04. "Tonight Is a Special Night" (co-produced by Tricky and Dobie)

=== Various artists – Batman Forever (soundtrack) ===
- 10. "The Riddler" – performed by Method Man
- 00. "The Riddler (Hide-Out Remix)" - performed by Method Man

== 1996 ==
=== AZ – Doe or Die Remix 12" ===
- A1. "Doe or Die (RZA Remix)" [feat. Raekwon]
- A2. "Doe or Die (Hardcore Remix)" [feat. Raekwon]
- B1. "Doe Or Die (Rumble Remix)" [feat. Raekwon]
- B3. "Doe Or Die (Allout Remix)" [feat. Raekwon]

=== Bounty Killer – My Xperience ===
- 09. "War Face (Ask Fi War) Remix" (feat. Raekwon)

=== Bounty Killer - Eyes A Bleed/Weed Life 12" ===
- A1. "Eyes A Bleed (RZA Remix) [feat. Masta Killa]

=== Dog Eat Dog – Play Games ===
- 05. "Step Right In" (feat. RZA)

=== Ghostface Killah – Ironman ===
- 01. "Iron Maiden" (featuring Raekwon & Cappadonna)
- 02. "Wildflower"
- 03. "The Faster Blade" (featuring Raekwon)
- 04. "260"
- 05. "Assassination Day" (featuring Inspectah Deck, RZA, Raekwon & Masta Killa)
- 06. "Poisonous Darts"
- 07. "Winter Warz" (featuring Raekwon, U-God, Masta Killa & Cappadonna)
- 08. "Box in Hand" (featuring Raekwon & Method Man)
- 10. "Camay" (featuring Cappadonna & Raekwon)
- 11. "Daytona 500" (featuring Raekwon & Cappadonna)
- 12. "Motherless Child" (featuring Raekwon)
- 13. "Black Jesus" (featuring Raekwon & U-God)
- 14. "After the Smoke Is Clear" (featuring The Delfonics, Raekwon & RZA)
- 15. "All That I Got Is You" (featuring Mary J. Blige)
- 16. "The Soul Controller" (removed on editions post-2001)
- 17. "Marvel" (featuring RZA)

=== Killarmy – Camouflage Ninjas / Wake Up 12" ===
- B1. "Wake Up" {also on Silent Weapons for Quiet Wars}

=== Shyheim – The Lost Generation ===
- 14. "Young Godz" (feat. Killa Sin, Rubbabandz & 9th Prince)

=== Various artists – America Is Dying Slowly ===
- 03. "America" – performed by Wu-Tang Clan & Killah Priest

=== Various artists – Don't Be a Menace to South Central While Drinking Your Juice in the Hood (soundtrack) ===
- 01. "Winter Warz" - performed by Ghostface Killah, Masta Killa, Cappadonna, U-God & Raekwon {also on Ironman}

=== Various artists – The Great White Hype (soundtrack) ===
- 05. "Who's the Champion"- performed by Ghostface Killah, RZA and Raekwon

=== Various artists – High School High (soundtrack) ===
- 03. "Wu-Wear: The Garment Renaissance" – performed by RZA, Method Man & Cappadonna
- 18. "Semi-Automatic: Full Rap Metal Jacket" – performed by Inspectah Deck, U-God & Streetlife

=== Various artists – Sunset Park (soundtrack) ===
- 02. "Motherless Child" - performed by Ghostface Killah & Raekwon {also on Ironman}

== 1997 ==
=== Björk – Bachelorette CDS ===
- 02. "Bachelorette (RZA Remix)"

=== Cappadonna – '97 Mentality 12" ===
- A1. "'97 Mentality" (featuring Ghostface Killah)

=== Gravediggaz – The Pick, the Sickle and the Shovel ===
- 01. "Intro"
- 02. "Dangerous Mindz" (co-produced by 4th Disciple)
- 08. "Pit of Snakes" (co-produced by True Master)
- 09. "The Night the Earth Cried" (co-produced by 4th Disciple)
- 13. "What's Goin' On?"

=== Killarmy – Silent Weapons for Quiet Wars ===
- 08. "Wake Up" (released 1996)
- 16. "War Face" (co-produced by 4th Disciple)

=== The Notorious B.I.G. – Life After Death ===
- 2–11. "Long Kiss Goodnight"

=== Sunz Of Man – We Can't Be Touched / Natural High 12" ===
- B1. "Natural High"

=== Various artists – Hoodlum (soundtrack) ===
- 05. "Dirty the Moocher" – performed by Wu-Tang Clan

=== Various artists – In tha Beginning...There Was Rap ===
- 01. "Sucker M.C.'s" – performed by Wu-Tang Clan

=== Various artists – Rhyme & Reason (soundtrack) ===
- 07. "Tragedy" – performed by RZA (co-produced by True Master)

=== Various artists – Soul in the Hole (soundtrack) ===
- 02. "Diesel" – performed by Wu-Tang Clan

=== Wu-Tang Clan – Wu-Tang Forever ===
Disc 1:

- 01. "Wu-Revolution" (feat. Poppa Wu)
- 02. "Reunited"
- 03. "For Heaven's Sake" (feat. Cappadonna)
- 06. "As High as Wu-Tang Get"
- 07. "Severe Punishment"
- 09. "Maria" (feat. Cappadonna)
- 11. "It's Yourz"

Disc 2:

- 01. "Intro"
- 02. "Triumph" (feat. Cappadonna)
- 03. "Impossible" (co-produced by 4th Disciple)
- 04. "Little Ghetto Boys" (feat. Cappadonna)
- 05. "Deadly Melody" (feat. Streetlife)
- 07. "The Projects"
- 08. "Bells of War"
- 10. "Dog Shit"
- 11. "Duck Seazon"
- 12. "Hellz Wind Staff" (feat. Streetlife)
- 14. "Black Shampoo"
- 15. "Second Coming" (feat. Tekitha)
- 16. "The Closing"
- 17. "Sunshower" [international track only]
- 18. " Projects (International Remix)" [international track only]

== 1998 ==
=== AZ – Pieces of a Man ===
- 13. "Whatever Happened (The Birth)" [featuring RZA]

=== Big Pun – Capital Punishment ===
- 21. "Tres Leches (Triboro Trilogy)" [featuring Prodigy and Inspectah Deck]

=== Cappadonna – The Pillage ===
- 03. "Run"
- 04. "Blood on Blood War" (feat. Killa Bamz)
- 06. "MCF"
- 13. "Young Hearts" (feat. Blue Raspberry)
- 15. "Pump Your Fist" (feat. Tekitha & Solomon Childs)

=== Deadly Venoms – Antidote ===
- 15. " Ready" (featuring Tekitha)
- 16. "Rap Scholar" (featuring Jamie Sommers & La the Darkman)

=== Funkmaster Flex – The Mix Tape, Vol. III ===
- 30. "Put Your Hammer Down" – performed by Wu-Tang Clan

=== La the Darkman – Heist of the Century ===
- 13. "Polluted Wisdom"

=== Method Man – Tical 2000: Judgement Day ===
- 02. "Perfect World"
- 10. "Suspect Chin Music" (featuring Streetlife)
- 11. "Retro Godfather"
- 16. "Party Crasher" {disputed production credits}

=== RZA – Bobby Digital in Stereo ===
- 01. "Intro"
- 02. "B.O.B.B.Y."
- 03. "Unspoken Word"
- 04. "Slow-Grind African"
- 05. "Airwaves"
- 07. "N.Y.C. Everything" (featuring Method Man)
- 08. "Mantis" (featuring Masta Killa & Tekitha)
- 09. "Slow-Grind French"
- 10. "Holocaust (Silkworm)" [featuring Holocaust, Doc Doom, Ghostface Killah & Ms. Roxy]
- 11. "Terrorist" (featuring Dom Pachino, P.R. Terrorist, Doc Doom & Killa Sin)
- 12. "Bobby Did It (Spanish Fly)" [featuring Islord, Timbo King, Ghostface Killah & Jamie Sommers]
- 13. "Handwriting on the Wall" (featuring Ras Kass)
- 15. "Slow-Grind Italian"
- 16. "My Lovin' Is Digi" (featuring The Force M.D.s & Ms. Roxy)
- 17. "Domestic Violence" (featuring Jamie Sommers & U-God)
- 18. "Project Talk" (featuring Kinetic 9)
- 19. "Lab Drunk"
- 20. "Fuck What You Think" (featuring Islord & 9th Prince)
- 21. "Daily Routine" (featuring Kinetic 9)
- 22. "Do You Hear the Bells?" {Bonus track}

=== Shyheim – Co-Defendant 12" ===
- A1. "Co-Defendant" (feat. Hell Razah) {also on The Swarm}

=== Sunz of Man – The Last Shall Be First ===
- 08. "Tribulations"
- 12. "Inmates to the Fire" (featuring Dreddy Kruger)
- 15. "Can I See You" (featuring Beretta 9)

=== Texas – Say What You Want CDS ===
- 02. "Say What You Want (All Day, Every Day) [Remix]" {featuring Wu-Tang Clan}

=== Various artists – Belly (soundtrack) ===
- 14. "Windpipe" – performed by Wu-Tang Clan

=== Various artists – Bulworth (soundtrack) ===
- 06. "The Chase" – performed by RZA
- 11. "Run" - performed by Cappadonna {also on The Pillage}

=== Various artists – I Got the Hook-Up (soundtrack) ===
- 14. "Who Rock This" (co-produced by Craig B) – performed by Ol' Dirty Bastard, Mystikal & Master P

=== Wu-Tang Killa Bees – Wu-Tang Killa Bees: The Swarm ===
- 02. "Legacy" – performed by Royal Fam
- 03. "Concrete Jungle" – performed by Sunz of Man & Timbo King
- 04. "Co-Defendant" – performed by Shyheim & Hell Razah
- 06. "Execute Them" – performed by Wu-Tang Clan & Streetlife
- 08. "And Justice for All" – performed by RZA, Islord, Killa Sin, P.R. Terrorist & Method Man
- 15. "'97 Mentality" – performed by Cappadonna & Ghostface Killah

== 1999 ==
=== Charli Baltimore – Cold As Ice ===
- 02. "Stand Up" (feat. Ghostface Killah)
- 14. "They"

=== GZA – Beneath the Surface ===
- 11. "1112" (featuring Masta Killa, Killah Priest & Njeri Earth)

=== Inspectah Deck – Uncontrolled Substance ===
- 02. "Movas & Shakers"
- 14. "Friction" (featuring Masta Killa)

=== Method Man & Redman – Blackout! ===
- 06. "Cereal Killer" (featuring Blue Raspberry)
- 12. "Run 4 Cover" (featuring Ghostface Killah and Streetlife)

=== Ol' Dirty Bastard – Nigga Please ===
- 08. "Nigga Please"
- 09. "Dirt Dog" (produced with Buddha Monk)
- 10. "I Want Pussy"
- 13. "Cracker Jack"

=== Sway & King Tech – This or That ===
- 26. "Belly of the Beast" (featuring RZA)

=== U-God – Golden Arms Redemption ===
- 01. "Enter U-God"
- 09. "Stay in Your Lane"
- 13. "Turbo Charge"

=== Various artists – Ghost Dog: The Way of the Samurai (film score) ===
- 01. "Ghost Dog Theme (W/Dogs & EFX)"
- 02. "Opening Theme (Raise Your Sword Instrumental)"
- 03. "Flying Birds"
- 04. "Samurai Theme"
- 05. "Gangsters Theme"
- 06. "Dead Birds"
- 07. "Fast Shadow (Version 1)" – performed by Wu-Tang Clan
- 08. "RZA #7"
- 09. "Funky Theme"
- 10. "RZA's Theme"
- 11. "Samurai Showdown (Raise Your Sword)" – performed by RZA
- 12. "Ghost Dog Theme"
- 13. "Fast Shadow (Version 2)" – performed by Wu-Tang Clan
- 14. "Untitled #8"
- 15. "Untitled #12 (Free Jazz)"
- 16. "Wu-World Order (Version 1)" – performed by RZA & La the Darkman

=== Various artists – Wu-Tang: Shaolin Style ===
(Produced entire soundtrack score, except tracks 3 & 7)

== 2000 ==
=== Ghostface Killah – Supreme Clientele ===
- 07. "The Grain" (featuring RZA)
- 08. "Buck 50" (featuring Method Man, Cappadonna & Redman)
- 13. "Stroke of Death" (featuring Solomon Childs & RZA)
- 17. "Child's Play"

=== Northstar / Black Knights – Fo' Sho / Zip Code 12" ===
- A1. "Fo' Sho" (feat. RZA) {from Ghost Dog OST}
- B1. "Zip Code" {from Ghost Dog OST}

=== Ol' Dirty Bastard – I Speak the Truth 12" ===
- A1. "I Speak the Truth (Hip-Hop Mix)" (feat. GZA)

=== Twigy – リミキシーズ呼吸法 ===
- 09. "病む街 Pt.2 (The RZA Remix)"

=== Various artists – Ghost Dog: The Way of the Samurai (soundtrack) ===
- 01. "Samurai Code Quotation" – performed by Forest Whitaker
- 02. "Strange Eyes" – performed by Sunz of Man, 12 O'Clock & Blue Raspberry
- 03. "4 Sho Sho" – performed by Northstar, RZA & Blue Raspberry
- 04. "Zip Code" – performed by Black Knights
- 05. "Samurai Code Quotation" – performed by Forest Whitaker
- 06. "Cakes" – performed by Kool G Rap & RZA
- 07. "Samurai Code Quotation" – performed by Forest Whitaker
- 08. "Don't Test/Wu Stallion" – performed by Suga Bang BangSuga Bang Bang
- 09. "Walking Through the Darkness" – performed by TekithaTekitha
- 10. "The Man" – performed by Masta Killa & Superb
- 11. "Samurai Code Quotation" – performed by Forest Whitaker
- 12. "Walk the Dogs" – performed by Royal Fam & La the Darkman
- 13. "Stay With Me" – performed by Melodie & 12 O'Clock
- 14. "East New York Stamp" – performed by Jeru the Damaja & Afu-Ra
- 15. "Samurai Code Quotation" – performed by Forest Whitaker
- 16. "Fast Shadow" – performed by Wu-Tang Clan
- 17. "Samurai Code Quotation" – performed by Forest Whitaker
- 18. "Samurai Showdown" – performed by RZA
- 19. "Samurai Code Final Quotation" – performed by Forest Whitaker

=== Wu-Tang Clan – The W ===
- 01. "Intro (Shaolin Finger Jab) / Chamber Music"
- 02. "Careful (Click, Click)"
- 03. "Hollow Bones"
- 04. "Redbull" (feat. Redman)
- 05. "One Blood Under W" (feat. Junior Reid)
- 06. "Conditioner" (feat. Snoop Dogg)
- 07. "Protect Ya Neck (The Jump Off)"
- 08. "Let My Niggas Live" (feat. Nas)
- 09. "I Can't Go to Sleep" (feat. Isaac Hayes)
- 11. "The Monument" (feat. Busta Rhymes)
- 12. "Gravel Pit"
- 13. "Jah World"

== 2001 ==
=== Ghostface Killah – Bulletproof Wallets ===
- 02. "Maxine" (featuring Raekwon)
- 03. "Flowers" (featuring Raekwon, Method Man & Superb)
- 11. "Walking Through the Darkness" (featuring Tekitha)
- 12. "Jealousy"

=== RZA – Digital Bullet ===
- 01. "Show You Love"
- 02. "Can't Lose" (featuring Beretta 9)
- 03. "Glocko Pop" (featuring Method Man, Masta Killa & Street Life)
- 04. "Must Be Bobby"
- 05. "Brooklyn Babies" (featuring The Force M.D.s & Masta Killa)
- 07. "Do U" (featuring Prodigal Sunn & GZA)
- 08. "Fools" (featuring Killa Sin & Solomon Childs)
- 10. "Black Widow Pt. 2" (featuring Ol' Dirty Bastard)
- 11. "Shady" (featuring Intrigue & Beretta 9)
- 12. "Break Bread" (featuring Jamie Sommers)
- 13. "Bong Bong" (featuring Beretta 9 & Madame Cez)
- 14. "Throw Your Flag Up" (featuring Crisis & Monk)
- 15. "Be a Man"
- 16. "Righteous Way" (featuring Junior Reid)
- 17. "Build Strong" (featuring Tekitha)
- 18. "Sickness" {bonus track}
- 19. "Odyssey" (featuring Isaac Hayes Band) {bonus track}

=== Wu-Tang Clan – Iron Flag ===
- 01. "In the Hood"
- 03. "Chrome Wheels"
- 04. "Soul Power (Black Jungle)" [featuring Flavor Flav]
- 05. "Uzi (Pinky Ring)"
- 08. "Babies"
- 09. "Radioactive (Four Assassins)"
- 11. "Iron Flag"
- 12. "Dashing (Reasons)"
- 13. "The W" {bonus track}

== 2002 ==
=== GZA – Legend of the Liquid Sword ===
- 14. "Rough Cut" (featuring Armel, Prodigal Sunn & 12 O'Clock)

=== Remedy – Code:Red ===
- 06. "Muslim and a Jew" (feat. Cilvaringz & RZA)

=== Tekitha – You 12" ===
- A1. "You"

=== Wu-Tang Killa Bees – The Sting ===
- 01. "Intro"
- 02. "Killa Beez" (RZA, U-God, Inspectah Deck, Suga Bang Bang, and Blue Raspberry)
- 03. "Out Think Me Now" (Solomon Childs)
- 06. "Bluntz, Martinez, Girlz & Gunz" (Warcloud)
- 08. "Spend Money" (Lord Superb and Intrigue)
- 09. "Take Up Space" (Lord Superb and Solomon Childs)
- 12. "Spit That G" (Cappadonna, Solomon Childs, 12 O'Clock, Suga Bang Bang, Prodigal Sunn, and Timbo King)
- 13. "Woodchuck" (Warcloud, Crisis, Timbo King, Meko the Pharaoh, and Cilvaringz)
- 14. "G.A.T." (Black Knights, Northstar, Solomon Childs, and Shyheim)
- 16. "When You Come Home" (Shyheim)
- 17. "K.B. Ridin'" (RZA, Ghostface Killah, Method Man, Prodigal Sunn, ShaCronz, and Suga Bang Bang)

=== Xavier Naidoo – Zwischenspiel / Alles für den Herrn ===
- 15. "Ich Kenne Nichts (Das So Schön Ist Wie Du)" (feat. RZA)

== 2003 ==
=== 9th Prince – Granddaddy Flow ===
- 13. "Tribute to the 5th Brother" (feat. RZA)

=== RZA – Birth of a Prince ===
- 02. "The Grunge"
- 04. "Grits" (featuring Allah Real & Masta Killa)
- 07. "You'll Never Know" (featuring Cilvaringz)
- 08. "Drink, Smoke + Fuck"
- 09. "The Whistle" (featuring Prodigal Sunn & Masta Killa)
- 10. "The Drop Off"
- 11. "Wherever I Go" (featuring Allah Real & CCF Division)
- 12. "Koto Chotan" (featuring Masta Killa & Tash Mahogany)
- 14. "Cherry Range" (featuring Xavier Naidoo)
- 16. "See the Joy"

=== Various artists – Bird Up: The Originals ===
- 05. "Bebop" (produced with Choco)

=== Various artists – Kill Bill Vol. 1 Original Soundtrack ===
- 06. "Ode to Oren Ishi" - performed by RZA
- 12. "Crane / White Lightning" {co-produced by Charles Bernstein}
- 18. "Yakuza Oren 1"
- 19. "Banister Fight"

=== Various artists – The World According to RZA ===
- 01. "Intro" – performed by RZA
- 02. "Mesmerize" – performed by Feven
- 03. "Det e så jag känner" – performed by Petter
- 04. "On tha Ground" – performed by RZA feat. Diaz, Petter & Feven (Scandinavian Allstars)
- 05. "The North Sea" – performed by RZA feat. Diaz
- 06. "Saïan Intro" – performed by RZA
- 07. "Saïan" – performed by RZA featuring Ghostface Killah & Saïan supa crew
- 08. "Please, Tends l'Oreille" – performed by Bams feat. U-God
- 09. "Warning" – performed by NAP
- 10. "Dedicace" – performed by Passi feat. RCFA
- 11. "Seul Face à Lui" – performed by RZA feat. IAM
- 12. "Souls on Fire" – performed by Xavier Naidoo feat. Deborah Cox
- 13. "Ich Weiss (On My Mind)" – performed by Curse
- 14. "Black Star Line-Up" – performed by Afrob & Sekou
- 15. "I've Never Seen ..." – performed by RZA feat. Xavier Naidoo
- 16. "Boing, Boing" – performed by RZA feat. Blade, Skinnyman & Ti2bs
- 17. "Make Money, Money" – performed by Bronz'n'blak
- 18. "Passaporto per Resistere" – performed by Frankie Hi-NRG MC
- 19. "Uzaktan Gelen Ses" – performed by Fuat, Bektas & Germ

== 2004 ==
=== Fried – Fried ===
- 01. "When You Get out of Jail"

=== Ghostface Killah – The Pretty Toney Album ===
- 03. "Kunta Fly Shit"
- 17. "Run" (featuring Jadakiss)

=== Masta Killa – No Said Date ===
- 03. "No Said Date"
- 12. "Old Man" (featuring Ol' Dirty Bastard & RZA)
- 14. "School" (featuring RZA)

=== Method Man – Tical 0: The Prequel ===
- 07. "The Turn" (featuring Raekwon)

=== Northstar – Bobby Digital Presents Northstar ===
- 04. "Red Rum" (featuring ShaCronz, Mikey Jarrett, Jr., and ShoShot)
- 09. "See Me" (featuring Free Murda)
- 10. "64"
- 14. "Destiny" (featuring Beretta 9)

=== Shyheim – The Greatest Story Never Told ===
- 07. "His.Story"
- 10. "New Producers" (feat. Yumi)

=== Solomon Childs – Funeral Talk (The Eulogy) ===
- 20. "Out Think Me Now" {released 2002}

=== Various artists – Blade: Trinity (soundtrack) ===
- 01. "Fatal" – performed by RZA
- 02. "I Gotta Get Paid – performed by Lil Flip, Ghostface Killah & Raekwon
- 03. "When the Guns Come Out" – performed by WC, E-40 & Christ Bearer
- 04. "Thirsty" – performed by Ol' Dirty Bastard & Black Keith
- 05. "Daywalkers" - performed by RZA & Ramin Djawadi

=== Various artists – Kill Bill Vol. 2 Original Soundtrack ===
- 15. "Black Mamba" - performed by The Wu-Tang Clan [hidden track]

=== Various artists – The Protector (soundtrack) ===
(Entire score, except track 3)

== 2005 ==
=== Ghostface Killah & Trife da God – Put It on the Line ===
- 18. "The Sun" (feat. Raekwon, Slick Rick & RZA)

=== Ol' Dirty Bastard – A Son Unique ===
- 04. "Back in the Air" (featuring Ghostface Killah)
- 07. "The Stomp Part II" (featuring RZA)
- 10. "Dirty & Grimey" (featuring N.O.R.E.)
- 12. "Skrilla"

=== Prodigal Sunn – Return of the Prodigal Sunn ===
- 04. "Brutality (The Grindz Remix)" (featuring C.C.F. Division)
- 10. "Lovely Ladies" (featuring Scotty)

=== Raaddrr Van – The Booth, The Mic, The Lyrics ===
- 08. "Wit-N-Tent II"
- 14. "Gimme"

=== Raekwon – State of Grace 12" ===
- A1. "State of Grace"

=== Various artists – Derailed (soundtrack) ===
- 02. "I Love You" – performed by Thea & RZA
- 05. "50 Ways To Leave Your Lover" – performed by Grayson Hill
- 06. "Really Want None" – performed by Free Murda
- 10. "Love" – performed by Thea

=== Various artists – Impulsive! Revolutionary Jazz Reworked ===
- 02. "II BS"

=== Various artists – Unleashed (soundtrack) ===
- 22. "Baby Boy" – performed by Thea Van Seijen
- 23. "Unleash Me" – performed by RZA feat. Prodigal Sunn & Christbearer

=== Various artists – Wu-Tang Meets the Indie Culture ===
- 08. "Biochemical Equation" – performed by RZA & MF Doom

== 2006 ==
=== La the Darkman – Return of the Darkman Mixtape ===
- 12. "This Thing" (feat. Method Man & RZA)
- 19. "Wu World Order" (feat. RZA) {released 1999}

=== Method Man – 4:21... The Day After ===
- 01. "Intro"
- 08. "4:20" (featuring Streetlife & Carlton Fisk) (produced with Beretta 9.)
- 10. "The Glide" (featuring Raekwon, U-God & La the Darkman)
- 15. "Konichiwa Bitches"
- 17. "Walk On" (feat. Redman) (produced with Versatile & Erick Sermon.)
- 19. "Presidential MC" (featuring Raekwon & RZA)

=== Solomon Childs – The Wake ===
- 1- 5. "My Guns is All I Got to Bust"

=== Sunz Of Man – The Old Testament ===
- 12. "Inmates to the Fire" {released 1998}

=== Warcloud – Smugglin Booze in the Graveyard ===
- 03. "The Trap Door"
- 10. "Lost Soldier of Wu-Tang"

== 2007 ==
=== Cilvaringz – I ===
- 03. "The Weeping Tiger" (feat. Raekwon, RZA & Ghostface Killah)
- 05. "Death to America" (produced with Cilvaringz.)
- 06. "In the Name of Allah" (feat. Masta Killa, Killah Priest, RZA & Shabazz The Disciple) (produced with Cilvaringz.)
- 07. "Jewels" (feat GZA)
- 10. "Caravanserai – Chapter I" (feat. Raekwon)
- 12. "Caravanserai – Chapter II" (feat. Salah Edin & Raekwon) (produced with Cilvaringz.)
- 16. "Forever Michael (Wacko Tablo)"

=== Free Murda – Let Freedom Reign ===
- 02. "My Black Nina" (featuring RZA & Shacronz)
- 09. "This 1's For Dirt"
- 17. "Yeah!"

=== Various artists – Afro Samurai: The Album ===
- 01. "Afro Theme"
- 02. "Afro Intro"
- 03. "Certified Samurai" (Featuring Talib Kweli, Lil Free & Suga Bang)
- 04. "Just a Lil Dude "Who Dat Ovah There"" (Featuring Q-Tip & Free Murder)
- 05. "Afro's Father Fight"
- 08. "Bazooka Fight I"
- 09. "Who Is Tha Man?" (Featuring Reverend William Burke)
- 10. "Ninjaman"
- 11. "Cameo Afro" (Featuring Big Daddy Kane, GZA & Suga Bang)
- 12. "Tears of a Samurai"
- 13. "Take Sword Pt. I" (Featuring Berretta 9)
- 14. "The Empty 7 Theme"
- 16. "Take Sword Pt. II" (Featuring 60 Second Assassin & True Master)
- 17. "Bazooka Fight II"
- 18. "Fury in My Eyes/Revenge" (Featuring Thea Van Seijen)
- 19. "Afro Samurai Theme' (First Movement)"
- 20. "Afro Samurai Theme (Second Movement)"
- 22. "So Fly" (featuring Division)
- 23. "We All We Got" (featuring Black Knights)
- 24. "Glorious Day" (Featuring Dexter Wiggles)
- 25. "Series Outro"

=== Wu-Tang Clan – 8 Diagrams ===
- 01. "Campfire"
- 02. "Take It Back" (produced with Easy Mo Bee)
- 03. "Get Them Out Ya Way Pa"
- 04. "Rushing Elephants"
- 05. "Unpredictable" (featuring Dexter Wiggle)
- 06. "The Heart Gently Weeps" (featuring Erykah Badu, Dhani Harrison & John Frusciante) (produced with George Drakoulias)
- 07. "Wolves" (featuring George Clinton)
- 08. "Gun Will Go" (featuring Sunny Valentine)
- 09. "Sunlight"
- 10. "Stick Me for My Riches" (featuring Gerald Alston) (produced with Mathematics)
- 11. "Starter" (featuring Sunny Valentine & Tash Mahogany)
- 12. "Windmill"
- 13. "Weak Spot" (produced with George Drakoulias)
- 14. "Life Changes"

== 2008 ==
=== Brooklyn Zu – Chamber #9, Verse 32 ===
- 06. "Knock, Knock" (feat. GZA) {released 2002}

=== GZA – Pro Tools ===
- 15. "Life Is a Movie" (featuring RZA & Irfane Khan-Acito)

=== RZA – Digi Snacks ===
- 01. "Digi Snacks Intro" (featuring Understanding)
- 03. "You Can't Stop Me Now" (featuring Inspectah Deck) (produced with George Drakoulias)
- 05. "Booby Trap" (featuring Dexter Wiggles) (produced with George Drakoulias)
- 06. "Try Ya Ya Ya" (featuring Monk & Thea Van Seijen) (produced with Che Vicious)
- 07. "Good Night" (featuring Rev William Burk, Crisis & Thea Van Seijen
- 08. "No Regrets"
- 09. "Money Don't Own Me" (featuring Monk & Stone Mecca)
- 11. "Drama" (featuring Monk & Thea Van Seijen)
- 12. "Up Again" (featuring John Frusciante, Beretta 9, Rev William Burk, George Clinton & El DeBarge) (produced with John Frusciante)
- 14. "Love Is Digi/Part II" (featuring Beretta 9, Crisis & Thea Van Seijen)
- 15. "O Day"
- 16. "Don't Be Afraid"
- 17. "The Wolf"

== 2009 ==
=== Raekwon – Only Built 4 Cuban Linx... Pt. II ===
- 06. "Black Mozart" (featuring Inspectah Deck, RZA & Tash Mahogany)
- 08. "New Wu" (featuring Ghostface Killah & Method Man)
- 30. "Rockstars" (featuring Inspectah Deck, GZA, Thea Van Seijen & Stone Mecca) [iTunes Gold Deluxe Edition bonus track]

=== Various artists – The RZA Presents: Afro Samurai Resurrection OST ===
- 01. "Combat (Afro Season II Open Theme)" – performed by RZA, and P. Dot
- 02. "You Already Know" – performed by Inspectah Deck, Kool G Rap & Suga Bang Bang
- 03. "Blood Thicker Than Mud "Family Affair" – performed by Reverend William Burk, Sly Stone & Stone Mecca
- 04. "Whar" – performed by Kool G Rap, Ghostface Killah, RZA & Tash Mahogany
- 05. "Girl Samurai Lullaby" – performed by Rah Digga & Stone Mecca
- 06. "Fight For You" – performed by Thea Van Seijen
- 07. "Bitch Gonna Get Ya'" – performed by Rah Digga
- 08. "Bloody Days Bloody Nights" – performed by Prodigal Sunn & Thea Van Seijen
- 09. "Kill Kill Kill" – performed by Monk
- 10. "Nappy Afro" – performed by Boy Jones
- 11. "Bloody Samurai" – performed by Black Knights, Dexter Wiggles & Thea Van Seijen
- 12. "Dead Birds" – performed by Sunz Of Man & Shavo Odadjian
- 13. "Arch Nemesis" – performed by Ace & MoeRoc
- 14. "Brother's Keeper" – performed by RZA, Reverend William Burk & Infinite
- 15. "Yellow Jackets" – performed by Ace & MoeRoc
- 16. "Take The Sword Part III" – performed by 60 Second Assassin, Leggezin, Crisis, Christbearer, Monk, Tre Irie, Beretta 9, Bobby Digital & Reverend William Burk
- 17. "Number One Samurai (Afro Season II Outro)" – performed by RZA & 9th Prince

=== Various artists – Wu-Tang Chamber Music ===
- 16. "NYC Crack" (RZA featuring Thea Van Seijen) (produced with Fizzy Womack & Andrew Kelley)

== 2010 ==
=== 9th Prince – One Man Army ===
- 07. "Another Summer Love"

=== 60 Second Assassin – Remarkable Timing ===
- 06. "Warzone (Remix)" (feat. RZA)

=== Achozen – Deuces ===
- 01. "Deuces"
- 02. "Salute/Sacrifice"
- 03. "Immaculate" (featuring Killah Priest & Shukura Holliday)
- 04. "If I Had A Gun" (featuring Brooklyn Zu & Rugged Monk)
- 05. "I Am You" (featuring Rayes Bek)

=== Method Man, Ghostface Killah & Raekwon – Wu-Massacre ===
- 05. "Our Dreams"

=== Remedy – It All Comes Down to This ===
- 02. "Streets Are Watchin"
- 07. "Black And White Millionaires" (featuring – King Just & Lounge Lo)
- 20. "The Duelist"

=== Kanye West – My Beautiful Dark Twisted Fantasy ===
- 01. "Dark Fantasy" (produced with Kanye West, No I.D., Jeff Bhasker, Mike Dean)

=== Wu-Tang Killa Bees – Pollen: The Swarm Part Three ===
- 04. "Dirts the Boogie"
- 06. "M.E.F."
- 12. "No Game Around Here"
- 13. "Into You"
- 15. "Flight of the Killer Bees"

== 2011 ==
=== Travis Barker – Give the Drummer Some ===
- 03. "Carry It" (featuring RZA, Raekwon & Tom Morello)

=== The Game – Purp & Patron ===
- 13. "Heart Breaker" (featuring Rev. Burke)

=== IronKap – The Almighty Ironkap ===
- 01. "Je To Sexy Bejt Zase Tady"

=== M-80 – Taking Back What's Mine ===
- 04. "3 Degrees" (feat. RZA & Solomon Childs)

=== Catherine Ringer – Ring n' Roll ===
- 05. "Prends-Moi"

=== Kanye West & Jay Z – Watch the Throne ===
- 06. "New Day" (produced with Kanye West, Mike Dean & Ken Lewis)

== 2012 ==
=== Various artists – The Man with the Iron Fists (soundtrack) ===
- 01. "The Baddest Man Alive" – performed by The Black Keys and RZA (produced with The Black Keys)
- 03. "White Dress" – performed by Kanye West (produced with Kanye West, Boogz & Tapez)
- 09. "Just Blowin' in the Wind" – performed by RZA and Flatbush Zombies
- 15. "I Go Hard" – performed by Ghostface Killah, Boy Jones and Wiz Khalifa

== 2013 ==
=== Earl Sweatshirt – Doris ===
- 12. "Molasses" (featuring RZA) (produced with Christian Rich)

=== Killah Priest – The Psychic World of Walter Reed ===
- 1–20. "Energy Work"
- 2–9. "Fire Stone"

=== Talib Kweli – Prisoner of Conscious ===
- 11. "Rocket Ships" (featuring Busta Rhymes)

=== Monsieur M – Les Zoniers ===
- 13. "Calme Ta Joie!"

=== Tony Touch – The Piece Maker 3: Return of the 50 MC's ===
- 13. "Unorthodox" (featuring Raekwon, JD Era, Ghostface Killah & RZA) (produced with Tony Touch & Psycho Les)

=== U-God – The Keynote Speaker ===
- 12. "Room Keep Spinning"
- 14. "Get Mine"
- 18. "Be Right There"

== 2014 ==
=== Black Knights – Every Night Is Still a Black Knight ===
- 03. "Designated Driver"
- 05. "Wash Me"
- 06. "I See Ya"
- 08. "Fallen Angel"
- 10. "Kiss"
- 11. "Surprise"

=== Wu-Tang Clan – A Better Tomorrow ===
- 01. "Ruckus in B Minor" (produced with Rick Rubin)
- 02. "Felt"
- 03. "40th Street Black / We Will Fight" (produced with Mathematics)
- 04. "Mistaken Identity" (featuring Streetlife)
- 05. "Hold the Heater"
- 06. "Crushed Egos" (produced with Adrian Younge)
- 09. "Preacher's Daughter"
- 10. "Pioneer the Frontier"
- 12. "Ron O'Neal" (featuring Nathaniel)
- 13. "A Better Tomorrow" (featuring Tekitha)
- 14. "Never Let Go"
- 15. "Wu-Tang Reunion"

== 2016 ==
=== Banks & Steelz – Anything But Words ===
(Note: All tracks co-produced by Paul Banks, except where noted.)

- 02. "Ana Electronic"
- 04. "Speedway Sonora"
- 05. "Wild Season" (featuring Florence Welch)
- 06. "Anything But Words" (produced with Ari Levine & Paul Banks.)
- 07. "Conceal"
- 08. "Love and War" (featuring Ghostface Killah)
- 09. "Can't Hardly Feel"
- 10. "One by One"
- 11. "Gonna Make It"
- 12. "Point of View" (featuring Method Man and Masta Killa)

== 2017 ==
=== A$AP Mob – Cozy Tapes Vol. 2: Too Cozy ===
- 15. "What Happens" (featuring ASAP Rocky, ASAP Ferg, ASAP Twelvyy, Playboi Carti, Joey Badass, Kirk Knight, Nyck Caution, Meechy Darko, and Zombie Juice)

=== Masta Killa – Loyalty Is Royalty ===
- 06. "Wise Words from the RZA" (featuring RZA)

=== Wu-Tang Clan – Silicon Valley Soundtrack ===
- 11. "Don't Stop"

== 2019 ==
=== Nas – The Lost Tapes II ===
- 05. "Tanasia"
- 11. "Highly Favored"

=== Miley Cyrus – She Is Coming ===
- 03. "D.R.E.A.M." (featuring Ghostface Killah) {produced with John Cunningham}

=== Berner – La Plaza ===
- 02. "La Plaza" (featuring Wiz Khalifa & Snoop Dogg)

== 2020 ==
=== PxRo – Great Adventures of PxRo ===
- 05. "M.A.N. Pt.1 (Father 2 Son)" (featuring Masta Killa)
- 12. "M.A.N. (Money, Authority, Need) Pt. 2" (featuring Masta Killa, Shaka Amazulu The 7th & Techsolo)

== 2022 ==
=== Killah Priest – The Holocaust - Savage Sanctuary ===
- 12. "Diary of a Madman Pt. 2" (featuring Gravediggaz & Black Knights)

=== B. Dvine - Radio Rebelde ===
- 03. "Never Stressing" (featuring Kinetic 9, Truck Jewels & The One Lavic)

=== RZA - RZA Presents: Bobby Digital and the Pit of Snakes ===
(produced by RZA and Stone Mecca)

- 1. "Under the Sun"
- 2. "Trouble Shooting"
- 3. "Something Going On"
- 4. "We Push"
- 5. "Cowards"
- 6. "Fight to Win"
- 7. "Celebrate"
- 8. "Live Your Own Rhythm (Outro)"

=== RZA - Minions: The Rise of Gru (soundtrack) ===
- 18. "Kung Fu Suite"

=== Westside Gunn - 10 ===
- 1. "Intro" (featuring AA Rashid)

== 2023 ==
=== Dave East - Fortune Favors the Bold ===
- 24. "Hallway Piss" (Bonus Track)

=== Westside Gunn - And Then You Pray for Me ===
- 9. "House of Glory" (featuring Stove God Cooks)

== 2024 ==
=== Kinetic 9 ===
- "All the Time in the World" (featuring Ghostface Killah, OVR & Cultcha Shoc)

== 2025 ==
=== Wu-Tang Clan & Mathematics - Black Samson, the Bastard Swordsman ===
- 02. "Mandingo" (produced with Mathematics)

=== Masta Killa - Balance ===
- 04. "Building with the Abbot" (featuring RZA)

=== Big Daddy Kane - Bobby Digital Presents: Juice Crew All-Stars ===
- "Open Ya Eyes"

== Albums executive produced ==
- 1993: Enter the Wu-Tang (36 Chambers) by Wu-Tang Clan
- 1994: Tical by Method Man
- 1995: Return to the 36 Chambers: The Dirty Version by Ol Dirty Bastard
- 1995: Only Built 4 Cuban Linx... by Raekwon
- 1995: Liquid Swords by GZA
- 1996: Ironman by Ghostface Killah
- 1997: Wu-Tang Forever by Wu-Tang Clan
- 1997: The Pick, the Sickle and the Shovel by Gravediggaz
- 1998: The Pillage by Cappadonna
- 1998: Bobby Digital in Stereo by RZA
- 1999: Beneath the Surface by GZA
- 1999: Blackout! by Method Man and Redman
- 1999: Uncontrolled Substance by Inspectah Deck
- 1999: Golden Arms Redemption by U-God
- 1999: Manchild by Shyheim
- 1999: Wu-Syndicate by Wu-Syndicate
- 2000: Supreme Clientele by Ghostface Killah
- 2000: The W by Wu-Tang Clan
- 2001: Bulletproof Wallets by Ghostface Killah
- 2001: Iron Flag by Wu-Tang Clan
- 2003: Birth of a Prince by RZA
- 2004: Bobby Digital Presents Northstar by Northstar
- 2007: I by Cilvaringz
- 2007: Let Freedom Reign by Free Murda
- 2007: Afro Samurai produced by RZA
- 2007: 8 Diagrams by Wu-Tang Clan
- 2009: Only Built 4 Cuban Linx II by Raekwon
- 2009: Afro Samurai: Resurrection produced by RZA
- 2012: The Man with the Iron Fists by Various artists
- 2013: Twelve Reasons to Die by Ghostface Killah
- 2013: The Keynote Speaker by U-God
- 2014: A Better Tomorrow by Wu-Tang Clan
- 2017: The Saga Continues by Wu-Tang Clan
