= The RZA Hits =

Compilation album by Wu-Tang Clan
- Released: June 22, 1999
- Recorded: 1992–1998
- Studio: Firehouse Studio (New York, NY); 36 Chambers (Staten Island, NY); Mystic Studios (Staten Island, NY)
- Genre: Hip hop
- Length: 1:01:22
- Label: Razor Sharp; Epic
- Producer: RZA; Ol' Dirty Bastard; True Master

RZA chronology
Ghost Dog: The Way of the Samurai (soundtrack) (1999)	The RZA Hits (1999)	Digital Bullet (2001)

The RZA Hits is a compilation album by American hip hop group Wu-Tang Clan, composed of songs featured on the first Wu-Tang album and its first round of solo albums. All songs were produced by member RZA, apart from "Brooklyn Zoo", which was produced by Ol' Dirty Bastard and True Master.

== Critical reception ==
Professional ratings
Review scores
Source	Rating
AllMusic	5/5 stars
Pitchfork	6/10
RapReviews	7/10
Robert Christgau	A−

- Entertainment Weekly (Spring 2000, p. 166) - Ranked #9 in EW's "Top 10 albums of the '90s"
- Q magazine (8/99, p. 134) - 4 stars (out of 5) - "...a supremely populist selection...keeping the molten hit count high. If the consistency of these prime-time cuts was sustained, this would probably be the best rap compilation ever rather than merely one of the best."
- Muzik (8/99, p. 79) - 5 stars (out of 5) - "...singular brilliance....Greatest Hits is as effective an insight into [RZA's] unique Staten Island mayhem as the title suggests."
- Rap Pages (9/99, p. 182) - "...the perfect reference manual for [RZA's] importance to rap music....a must-listen for anyone who has ever uttered the word 'Hip-Hop'." - Rating: A

== Track listing ==
No.	Title	Writer(s)	Producer(s)	Length
1.	"Narration by the RZA"			1:03
2.	"Wu-Tang Clan Ain't Nuthing ta F' Wit"	Clifford Smith; Corey Woods; Dennis Coles; Gary Grice; Jason Hunter; Lamont Hawkins; Robert Diggs; Russell Jones	RZA; Method Man (co.)	3:36
3.	"Protect Ya Neck"	Smith; Woods; Coles; Grice; Hunter; Hawkins; Diggs; Jones	RZA	4:52
4.	"Shimmy Shimmy Ya"	Jones; Diggs	RZA	2:41
5.	"Liquid Swords"	Grice; Diggs; Eddie Brigati; Felix Cavaliere; Joe Zawinul	RZA	3:01
6.	"Narration by the RZA"			1:20
7.	"Method Man"	Smith; Woods; Coles; Grice; Hunter; Hawkins; Diggs; Jones	RZA	4:55
8.	"Incarcerated Scarfaces"	Woods; Diggs	RZA	4:30
9.	"Ice Cream"	Woods; Diggs	RZA	4:16
10.	"Narration by the RZA"			1:31
11.	"Bring the Pain"	Smith; Diggs	RZA	3:15
12.	"Winter Warz"	Coles; Woods; Darryl Hill; Hawkins; Elgin Turner; Diggs	RZA	4:41
13.	"Brooklyn Zoo"	Jones	Ol' Dirty Bastard; True Master	3:40
14.	"All I Need"	Smith; Diggs	RZA	3:16
15.	"C.R.E.A.M."	Smith; Woods; Coles; Grice; Hunter; Hawkins; Diggs; Jones; Isaac Hayes; David Porter	RZA	4:12
16.	"All That I Got Is You"	Coles; Mary Jane Blige; Diggs; Freddie Perren; Alphonso Mizell; Berry Gordy; Deke Richards	RZA	5:00
17.	"Narration by the RZA"			1:40
18.	"Wu-Wear: The Garment Renaissance"	Diggs	RZA	3:53
Total length:				1:01:22

Sample credits

- Track 5 contains elements from "Groovin' on a Sunday Afternoon" written by Eddie Brigati and Felix Cavaliere and a sample from "Mercy, Mercy, Mercy" written by Joe Zawinul, both performed by Willie Mitchell.
- Track 15 contains excertps from "As Long As I've Got You" written by Isaac Hayes and David Porter and performed by the Charmels.
- Track 16 contains a sample from "Maybe Tomorrow" by The Jackson 5.

Notes

- Tracks 2, 3 and 15 are taken from Wu-Tang Clan's 1993 album Enter the Wu-Tang (36 Chambers).
- Tracks 4 and 13 are taken from Ol' Dirty Bastard's 1994 album Return to the 36 Chambers: The Dirty Version.
- Track 5 is taken from GZA's 1995 album Liquid Swords.
- Tracks 7, 11 and 14 are taken from Method Man's 1994 album Tical.
- Tracks 8 and 9 are taken from Raekwon's 1995 album Only Built 4 Cuban Linx....
- Tracks 12 and 16 are taken from Ghostface Killah's 1996 album Ironman.
- Track 18 is taken from the 1996 soundtrack album High School High.

== Personnel ==
- Robert "RZA" Diggs – lyrics, vocals, programming, producer, arranger, mixing, executive producer
- Russell "Ol' Dirty Bastard" Jones – lyrics, vocals, producer
- Clifford "Method Man" Smith – lyrics, vocals, co-producer
- Gary "GZA" Grice – lyrics, vocals
- Jason "Inspectah Deck" Hunter – lyrics, vocals
- Lamont "U-God" Hawkins – lyrics, vocals
- Dennis "Ghostface Killah" Coles – lyrics, vocals
- Corey "Raekwon" Woods – lyrics, vocals
- Elgin "Masta Killa" Turner – lyrics, vocals
- Darryl "Cappadonna" Hill – lyrics, vocals
- Booster – additional vocals (track 11)
- Mary J. Blige – lyrics & vocals (track 16)
- Selwyn "4th Disciple" Bougard – scratches (tracks: 2, 7, 15)
- Derek "True Master" Harris – producer (track 13)
- Mitchell "Divine" Diggs – executive producer
- John Carr – art direction
- Will Kennedy – artwork
- Brian "B+" Cross – photography

== Charts ==
Chart (1999)	Peak position
UK Compilation Albums (OCC)	100
US Billboard 200	61
US Top R&B/Hip-Hop Albums (Billboard)	30
