= Words from the Genius =

Studio album by the Genius
- Released: February 19, 1991
- Recorded: 1990
- Genre: Hip-hop
- Length: 63:39
- Labels: Cold Chillin'; Reprise; Warner Bros.
- Producers: Easy Mo Bee; Patrick Harvey; Jesse West

The Genius chronology
Words from the Genius (1991)	Liquid Swords (1995)

Wu-Tang Clan solo chronology
Words from the Genius (1991)	Tical (1994)

Rerelease cover
- Words From The Genius (1994 re-release)

Professional ratings
Review scores
Source	Rating
AllMusic	2/5 stars
Music City	(favorable)
RapReviews	7/10

Words from the Genius is the debut studio album by the American rapper GZA, under his original stage name "The Genius". The album never charted, and GZA went on to co-found Wu-Tang Clan in 1992 after the album's failure.

== Album background ==
It was released on February 19, 1991. It is significant as one of the few albums released by a Wu-Tang Clan member before the founding of the group in late 1992 and one of only two pre- Wu-Tang clan releases any of the members recorded with a major label (the other is Ooh, I Love You, Rakeem EP by Prince Rakeem (RZA)).

== Album re-release ==
It was re-released in 1994, with the song "Come Do Me" replaced by "Pass the Bone." Both versions are now out of print. In 2006, an expanded version was released by Traffic Entertainment Group, the owner of the bulk of the Cold Chillin' Records catalog.

"I was signed to Cold Chillin' 'bout five years ago," GZA recalled in 1995. "They put out an album but didn't promote it. They tried to put it out again last year after everything happened with the Clan, put a '94 date on it, but still didn't put any money behind it, so it didn't sell twice. I'm still proud of it, though. The beats ain't all that but, lyrically, shit was bangin'. So it wasn't all peaches and cream, but I was determined to break through. 'A quitter never wins, and a winner never quits.' Wu-Tang!!"

== Critical reception ==
The album received mixed reviews. Steve Juon, writing for RapReviews, stated: "Words From the Genius doesn’t go down as an all-time classic. [...] There are plenty of worthwhile moments here though. The anti-violence 'Stop the Nonsense,' the braggadocious 'Feel the Pain' and the Patrick Harvey produced 'What Are Silly Girls Made Of' stand the test of time even without the trademark dirty, grimy, kung-fu sampling sound GZA would become better known for with RZA’s help. This is pre-Wu, this is proto-Wu, but it’s not hard to see what Gary Grice would become in short order."

== Track listing ==
Words from the Genius track listing
No.	Title	Writer(s)	Producer(s)	Length
1.	"Come Do Me"	Gary Eldridge Grice	Jesse West	4:47
2.	"Phony As Ya Wanna Be"	Grice	Easy Mo Bee	5:04
3.	"True Fresh M.C."	Grice	Easy Mo Bee	3:39
4.	"The Genius Is Slammin'"	Grice; Osten Harvey Jr.	Easy Mo Bee	4:23
5.	"Words from a Genius"	Grice; Harvey Jr.	Easy Mo Bee	5:05
6.	"Who's Your Rhymin' Hero"	Grice	Patrick Harvey	4:34
7.	"Feel the Pain"	Grice	Easy Mo Bee	3:39
8.	"Those Were the Days"	Grice	Easy Mo Bee	4:37
9.	"Life of a Drug Dealer"	Grice; Harvey Jr.	Easy Mo Bee	3:39
10.	"Stop the Nonsense"	Grice	Easy Mo Bee	3:41
11.	"Living Foul"	Grice	Easy Mo Bee	4:22
12.	"Drama"	Grice; Harvey Jr.	Easy Mo Bee	3:59
13.	"Stay Out of Bars"	Grice	Patrick Harvey	3:55
14.	"What Are Silly Girls Made of"	Grice	Patrick Harvey	4:32
15.	"Superfreak"	Grice	Patrick Harvey	4:38

2006 re-release bonus tracks
No.	Title	Writer(s)	Producer(s)	Length
16.	"Pass the Bone" (featuring Prince Rakeem)	Grice; Robert Fitzgerald Diggs	Prince Rakeem; The Genius	3:52
17.	"Words from the Genius" (Prince Rakeem Remix)	Grice; Diggs	Prince Rakeem	3:31
18.	"Come Do Me" (Dub Remix)	Grice	Jesse West; Melquan	4:50

1994 re-release and Spotify edition
No.	Title	Writer(s)	Producer(s)	Length
1.	"Pass the Bone" (featuring Prince Rakeem)	Gary Eldridge Grice; Robert Fitzgerald Diggs	Prince Rakeem; The Genius	3:52
2.	"Life of a Drug Dealer"	Grice; Osten Harvey Jr.	Easy Mo Bee	3:39
3.	"The Genius Is Slammin'"	Grice; Harvey Jr.	Easy Mo Bee	4:23
4.	"Those Were the Days"	Grice	Easy Mo Bee	4:37
5.	"What Silly Girls Are Made of"	Grice	Patrick Harvey	4:32
6.	"Living Foul"	Grice	Easy Mo Bee	4:22
7.	"Words from the Genius"	Grice; Harvey Jr.	Easy Mo Bee	5:05
8.	"Who's Your Rhymin' Hero"	Grice	Patrick Harvey	4:34
9.	"Phony As You Wanna Be"	Grice	Easy Mo Bee	5:04
10.	"Stop the Nonsense"	Grice	Easy Mo Bee	3:41
11.	"Superfreak"	Grice	Patrick Harvey	4:38
12.	"Stay Out of Bars"	Grice	Patrick Harvey	3:55
