= Ghost Dog: The Way of the Samurai (soundtrack) =

Soundtrack for film of the same name

The soundtrack of the 1999 Jim Jarmusch film Ghost Dog: The Way of the Samurai features an original score by RZA and also features hip-hop songs by such artists as Wu-Tang Clan, Killah Priest, and Public Enemy. Two soundtrack albums were released, one internationally and another in Japan, each with different song mixes, some of which do not appear in the film. There are many songs, however, that can be heard in the film that appear on neither soundtrack album. It is the first of RZA's fully scored film works.

== Film score ==
Ghost Dog: The Way of the Samurai (Music from the Motion Picture)

Film score by RZA, various artists
- Released: 1999 (Japan)
- Genre: Hip-hop
- Label: JVC
- Producer: RZA

RZA, various artists chronology
Bobby Digital in Stereo (1998)	Ghost Dog: The Way of the Samurai (Music from the Motion Picture) (1999)	Hits (1999)

Professional ratings
Review scores
Source	Rating
Allmusic	link
Pitchfork	8.5/10

The score release was released in 1999 as a Japan exclusive and focuses on the original instrumental score of the film, while also including vocal tracks from Wu-Tang Clan and RZA that were not heard in the film.

Track listing

1. "Ghost Dog Theme (W/Dogs & EFX)"
2. "Opening Theme (Raise Your Sword Instrumental)"
3. "Flying Birds"
4. "Samurai Theme"
5. "Gangsters Theme"
6. "Dead Birds"
7. "Fast Shadow (Version 1)" – by Wu-Tang Clan
8. "RZA #7"
9. "Funky Theme"
10. "RZA's Theme"
11. "Samurai Showdown (Raise Your Sword)" – by RZA
12. "Ghost Dog Theme"
13. "Fast Shadow (Version 2)" – by Wu-Tang Clan*
14. "Untitled #8"*
15. "Untitled #12 (Free Jazz)"*
16. "Wu-World Order (Version 1)" – by Wu-Tang Clan feat. La the Darkman*
- *not used in the film

== Soundtrack album ==
Ghost Dog: The Way Of The Samurai – The Album

Soundtrack album by RZA, various artists
- Released: April 11, 2000
- Genre: Hip-hop
- Labels: Razor Sharp, Epic, SME
- Producer: RZA

RZA, various artists chronology
The RZA Hits (1999)	Ghost Dog: The Way Of The Samurai – The Album (2000)	Digital Bullet (2001)

The song soundtrack features music from the film as well as quotations from Hagakure: the Book of the Samurai by Tsunetomo Yamamoto (translated into English by William Scott Wilson) as read by Forest Whitaker in the voice of the title character. However, the focus of this album is on the songs, not the instrumental score of the movie.

In a contemporary review for The Village Voice, music critic Robert Christgau gave the album an "A−" grade and called it "hip-hop as mystery, beauty, pleasure—as idealized aural environment." He said that RZA uses vocals musically, as the lyrical content is acceptable but not important, and that the album is more efficient than Curtis Mayfield's Superfly and John Lurie's Get Shorty in "the essential soundtrack service of consistent background listenability." Christgau ranked it the seventh best album of the year in his list for the annual Pazz & Jop critics poll. In a retrospective review, Allmusic's Matt Whalley gave Ghost Dog four stars and was disappointed that "so few people got to hear" the album, which he felt was "prime RZA".

Track listing

1. "Samurai Code Quotation" – Forest Whitaker
2. "Strange Eyes" – Sunz of Man, 12 O'Clock & Blue Raspberry
3. "4 Sho Sho" – North Star featuring RZA
4. "Zip Code" – Black Knights
5. "Samurai Code Quotation" – Forest Whitaker
6. "Cakes" – Kool G Rap featuring RZA
7. "Samurai Code Quotation" – Forest Whitaker
8. "Don't Test/Wu Stallion" – Suga Bang Bang
9. "Walking Through the Darkness" – Tekitha
10. "The Man" – Masta Killa & Superb
11. "Samurai Code Quotation" – Forest Whitaker
12. "Walk The Dogs" – Royal Fam & La the Darkman
13. "Stay With Me" – Melodie & 12 O'Clock
14. "East New York Stamp" – Jeru The Damaja and Afu-Ra
15. "Samurai Code Quotation" – Forest Whitaker
16. "Fast Shadow" – Wu-Tang Clan
17. "Samurai Code Quotation" – Forest Whitaker
18. "Samurai Showdown" – RZA
19. "Samurai Code Final Quotation" – Forest Whitaker

== Other songs in the film ==
A number of songs appear in the film but are on neither soundtrack album release. They include the following:

- "Ice Cream" – written by R. Diggs and C. Woods, arranged by RZA; performed by Raekwon featuring Ghostface Killah and Cappadonna
- "From Then Till Now" – written by Walter Reed, Ernest Aye, D. Black, J. Barry and W. Warwick; performed by Killah Priest
- "Armagideon Time" – written by Willi Williams and Clement Dodd; performed by Willie Williams
- "Nuba 1" – written by Andrew Cyrille and Jeanne Lee; performed by Andrew Cyrille and Jimmy Lyons
- "Cold Lampin' with Flavor" – written by Flavor Flav, Hank Shocklee and Eric Sadler; performed by Public Enemy
- "Dangerous Fun" – written and performed by William Loose
- "Fire House Rock" – performed by Wailing Souls
