= Anything but Words =

Anything But Words

Studio album by Banks & Steelz
- Released: August 26, 2016
- Recorded: 2013–2015
- Studios: Electric Lady (Manhattan, NY); 123 (London)
- Genre: East Coast hip hop
- Length: 55:14
- Label: Warner Bros.
- Producers: Paul Banks (Note: Also an executive producer); RZA; John Hill; Kid Harpoon; Ari Levine; Andrew Wyatt

Paul Banks chronology
Everybody on My Dick Like They Supposed to Be (2013)	Anything But Words (2016)

RZA chronology
Only One Place To Get It (2014)	Anything But Words (2016)	Saturday Afternoon Kung Fu Theater (2022)

Singles from Anything But Words
- 1. "Love and War" Released: May 19, 2016; 2. "Giant" Released: June 9, 2016; 3. "Speedway Sonora" Released: July 14, 2016; 4. "Sword in the Stone" Released: July 28, 2016; 5. "Anything But Words" Released: August 12, 2016; 6. "Wild Season" Released: April 22, 2017

Anything but Words is the debut studio album by Banks & Steelz, a collaborative project between Interpol vocalist Paul Banks and Wu-Tang Clan member RZA. It was released August 26, 2016, on Warner Bros. Records. Recording of the album dates back to 2013, with a demo of early material being created two years prior. Anything But Words features guest appearances by other musicians, as well as other Wu-Tang Clan members, and additional production from Ari Levine and Andrew Wyatt, among others. Five singles were released from the album; "Love and War", featuring Ghostface Killah, "Giant", "Speedway Sonora", "Sword in the Stone", featuring Kool Keith, and "Anything but Words".

== Background and recording ==
When asked by his manager who he would like to work together with musically, RZA responded with Interpol member Paul Banks. When asked about his choice in a 2013 Rolling Stone interview, RZA stated that Banks "just has an energy about him" and that "it [would] be great" if the two were to collaborate. In 2011, during which the duo were not planning on making an album together, a demo of material was created with Banks providing vocals over a beat developed by RZA. The first public mention of the duo's collaborations was made in the same Rolling Stone interview. It was during 2013 that the duo began working on an album together. RZA expected the album to take about a year to finish. During 2014, Banks' main project Interpol recorded a studio album titled El Pintor, which was then released in September of that year. The duo wanted to release their material in 2015, but later realized that the material was unfinished.

== Release and promotion ==
The duo premiered the album's lead single, "Love and War", featuring fellow Wu-Tang Clan member Ghostface Killah, on the Apple Music radio station Beats 1. A video for the song, which pays tribute to a scene from the film Reservoir Dogs, was also released the following day. Details for Anything but Words, as well as tour dates, were released on June 9. Also released on that day was the album's second single, "Giant". "Speedway Sonora" was released as the album's third single on July 14. "Sword in the Stone", featuring rapper Kool Keith, was released as the album's fourth single on July 28 and the album's title track was released as the fifth single on August 12.

== Track listing ==
All songs produced by Paul Banks and RZA except where noted. Credits adapted from AllMusic.

Anything But Words — CD — digital download — streaming — vinyl
No.	Title	Writer(s)	Producer(s)	Length
1.	"Giant"	Paul Banks; Robert Diggs; John Hill; Tom Hull	Hill; Kid Harpoon	3:52
2.	"Ana Electronic"	Banks; Diggs		3:44
3.	"Sword in the Stone" (featuring Kool Keith)	Banks; Diggs; Nico Fidenco; Keith Thornton	Andrew Wyatt	4:50
4.	"Speedway Sonora"	Banks; Diggs		4:15
5.	"Wild Season" (featuring Florence Welch)	Banks; Diggs; Florence Welch; Wyatt		4:26
6.	"Anything but Words"	Banks; Diggs	Banks; Ari Levine; RZA	4:21
7.	"Conceal"	Banks; David Coles; Diggs; Gintas Janusonis; Andrew Kelley; Borahm Lee; Wes Mingus; Arnold Mischkulnig; Kejuan Muchita; Noah Rubin; Josh Werner		3:59
8.	"Love and War" (featuring Ghostface Killah)	Banks; Dennis Coles; Diggs		4:09
9.	"Can't Hardly Feel"	Banks; Diggs		4:33
10.	"One by One"	Banks; Diggs		4:48
11.	"Gonna Make It"	Banks; Diggs; John F. Kennedy		5:46
12.	"Point of View" (featuring Method Man and Masta Killa)	Banks; Diggs; Clifford Smith; Elgin Turner		6:31
Total length:				55:14

== Charts ==
Chart (2016)	Peak position
UK R&B Albums (Official Charts)	18
US Billboard 200	186
US Top Alternative Albums (Billboard)	15
US Top Rap Albums (Billboard)	11
US Top Rock Albums (Billboard)	16

== Release history ==
Country	Date	Format	Label
Worldwide	August 26, 2016	CD; digital download; streaming; vinyl	Warner Bros.

== Notes and references ==
Notes
