= Love and War (Banks & Steelz song) =

Single by Banks & Steelz featuring Ghostface Killah

from the album Anything But Words
- Released: May 19, 2016
- Recorded: 2013–15 in New York, New York
- Genre: Hip hop; rap rock
- Length: 4:09
- Label: Warner Bros.
- Songwriters: Paul Banks; Dennis Coles; Robert Diggs
- Producers: Paul Banks; RZA

Banks & Steelz singles chronology
"Love and War" (2016)	"Giant" (2016)

Music video
- "Love and War" on YouTube

"Love and War" (stylized as "Love + War") is the debut single by Banks & Steelz, a collaborative project created by Interpol frontman Paul Banks and Wu-Tang Clan member RZA. Featuring a rap verse from fellow Wu-Tang Clan member Ghostface Killah, it was premiered on the Apple Music radio station Beats 1 on May 19, 2016. It was subsequently released as a digital download, acting as the lead single from their debut studio album, Anything But Words (2016). A music video for the song, which pays tribute to the film Reservoir Dogs, was also released on May 20.

== Composition ==
"Love and War" is a rock-influenced hip hop song. It features rap verses from RZA and Ghostface Killah as well as a sung chorus done by Paul Banks, where he repeats "All is fair in love and war / What you keeping score for" throughout. April Clare Welsh of Fact stated that the song is built around "shuffling grooves, driving guitar and Mariachi-style trumpet."

== Music video ==
The music video for the "Love and War" was released on the duo's YouTube channel on May 20, 2016. Directed by director group Arms Race, the video is a tribute to an iconic torture scene from the 1992 Quentin Tarantino-directed film Reservoir Dogs. The video has been described as "grisly" by Sarah Murphy of Exclaim!. Tom Breihan of Stereogum described the video, saying that it "starts out as a yakuza torture scene, and it takes some unexpected turns." Banks and RZA also appear in the video as hired guns; RZA shares "Tarantino-esque" dialogue with Banks, who remains mute during the video. RZA had worked with Tarantino in the past; he worked on the soundtrack for his Kill Bill series.

== Track listing ==
Digital download
No.	Title	Length
1.	"Love and War"	4:09

== Personnel ==
Personnel adapted from AllMusic.

Banks & Steelz

- Paul Banks – composing, production, vocals
- RZA – composing, production, vocals

Additional personnel

- Beatriz Artola – engineer
- Matthew Barrick – drums
- Brandon Bost – assistant engineer
- Vira Byramji – engineer
- Greg Calbi – mastering
- Mike Crossey – mixing, programming
- Steve Fallone – mastering
- Ghostface Killah – composing, vocals
- Jonathan Gilmore – engineer, mixing engineer
- Billy Hickey – engineer
- John Horne – assistant engineer
- Phil Joly – engineer
- Rob Moose – piano
- Clinton Patterson – trumpet
- Brandon H. Smith – assistant engineer
- Gosha Usov – assistant engineer
- Steve Vealey – engineer
- Joe Visciano – engineer

== Release history ==
Region	Date	Label	Format
Worldwide	May 19, 2016	Warner Bros.	Digital download
