= Digi Snacks =

Studio album by RZA as Bobby Digital
- Released: June 24, 2008
- Recorded: 2007–2008
- Genre: Hip-hop
- Length: 60:04
- Labels: Wu; Koch
- Producers: RZA; the Bad Parts; Che Vicious; Danny Keyz; David Banner; George Drakoulias; James Desmond; John Frusciante; King Tech; Panauh Kalayeh

RZA chronology
RZA-Instrumental Experience (2007)	Digi Snacks (2008)	The RZA Presents: Afro Samurai Resurrection OST (2009)

Wu-Tang Clan solo chronology
The Big Doe Rehab (2007)	Digi Snacks (2008)	The Cappatilize Project (2008)

Professional ratings
Review scores
Source	Rating
AllMusic	4/5 stars
The Boston Globe	(mixed)
Robert Christgau	(3-star Honorable Mention)
The Guardian	3/5 stars
The Observer	4/5 stars
Pitchfork Media	(4.0/10)
PopMatters	(7/10)
Seattle Weekly	(mixed)
The Village Voice	(favorable)
XXL	(L)

Digi Snacks is the fourth solo studio album by American rapper and producer RZA; the third album under his Bobby Digital alias. Continuing the story from Digital Bullet, the album was released on June 24, 2008, on Wu Music Group and Koch Records. The album was originally titled Digi Snax, but it was changed before release.

The album's first single, "You Can't Stop Me Now," features fellow Wu-Tang Clan rapper Inspectah Deck; a track by this name featured in reports of early track listings of the group's 8 Diagrams album. RZA has since released another track, "Drama," featuring Monk of Black Knights and singer Thea van Seijen.

The album also features production from David Banner (on "Straight Up the Block", suggested to be the album's second single), from California producer Panauh Kalayeh and from King Tech, as well as live instrumentation from Wu-Tang Clan-affiliated funk/soul group Stone Mecca. The latter also backed RZA on a June–July tour of the US, which also featured surprise appearances by Wu-Tang members and affiliates, to accompany the album's release.

RZA described the album to Billboard.com as "simply fun hip-hop... a perfect blend of reality, fiction, sci-fi, and martial arts." The album cover's design was done by Gary Alford, and includes a brief comic within the sleeves.

== Background ==
This world wasn’t in a digital format in 1998. Now digital is the most compelling form of commerce and entertainment so this is like a relaunch of the character. The album is Digi Snacks because it’s a snack pack of Bobby Digital’s world. Not only music and sounds, but also the comic background, the sci-fi background, the black-exploitation background. Look at the artwork—a girl with an afro, an Asian girl, Bobby sitting in the big king’s chair and then the villains—Raven, Hawk, Eagle and Crane, the four birds of prey that I use as my enemies. Bobby Digital’s life-long nemesis. That adds a comic element to it—as well as martial arts. I’m planning a comic book, a video game—I’m already talking to people. I want fans to be aware of these things.

== Production ==
The album's first single, "You Can't Stop Me Now," features fellow Wu-Tang Clan rapper Inspectah Deck; a track by this name featured in reports of early track listings of the group's 8 Diagrams album. The track samples a version of the Barrett Strong/Norman Whitfield composition "Message from a Black Man," also previously sampled by Mos Def on Undeniable in True Magic, MF Doom on the King Geedorah album Take Me to Your Leader, and in the same year, sampled by Nas and producer Salaam Remi for "You Can't Stop Us Now," from the rapper's Untitled album.

== Track listing ==
No.	Title	Producer(s)	Length
1.	"Digi Snacks Intro" (featuring Understanding)	RZA	2:07
2.	"Long Time Coming" (featuring Danny Keyz)	Panauh Kalayeh; James Desmond; Danny Keyz	4:11
3.	"You Can't Stop Me Now" (featuring Inspectah Deck)	RZA; George Drakoulias	4:08
4.	"Straight Up the Block"	David Banner	3:01
5.	"Booby Trap" (featuring Dexter Wiggles)	RZA	3:40
6.	"Try Ya Ya Ya" (featuring Monk & Thea Van Seijen)	Che Vicious; RZA	3:32
7.	"Good Night" (featuring Rev William Burk, Crisis & Thea Van Seijen)	RZA	5:04
8.	"No Regrets"	RZA	3:01
9.	"Money Don't Own Me" (featuring Monk & Stone Mecca)	RZA	4:52
10.	"Creep" (featuring Black Knights, Northstar, Thea Van Seijen & Dexter Wiggles)	King Tech	4:44
11.	"Drama" (featuring Monk & Thea Van Seijen)	RZA	5:00
12.	"Up Again" (featuring John Frusciante, Beretta 9, Rev William Burk, George Clinton & El DeBarge)	RZA; John Frusciante	6:19
13.	"Put Your Guns Down" (featuring Startel)	The Bad Parts	3:34
14.	"Love Is Digi/Part II" (featuring Beretta 9, Crisis & Thea Van Seijen)	RZA	2:47
15.	"O Day"	RZA	4:00
16.	"Don’t Be Afraid" (Hidden Bonus Track) CD)	RZA	4:05

iTunes deluxe edition bonus tracks
No.	Title	Producer(s)	Length
16.	"Don't Be Afraid"	RZA	4:05
17.	"The Wolf"	RZA	1:47

International edition bonus tracks
No.	Title	Producer(s)	Length
17.	"Glorious Days"	RZA	3:33
18.	"Insomnia"	J-Love	3:48

Notes

- International edition contains an extended version of track #3 "You Can’t Stop Me Now" 8:09. Contains additional vocals from U-God, Zu Keeper & Inspectah Deck.

== Charts ==
Chart (2008)	Peak position
US Billboard 200	111
US Top R&B/Hip-Hop Albums (Billboard)	29
