= Banks & Steelz =

Musical project of Wu-Tang's RZA and Interpol's Paul Banks

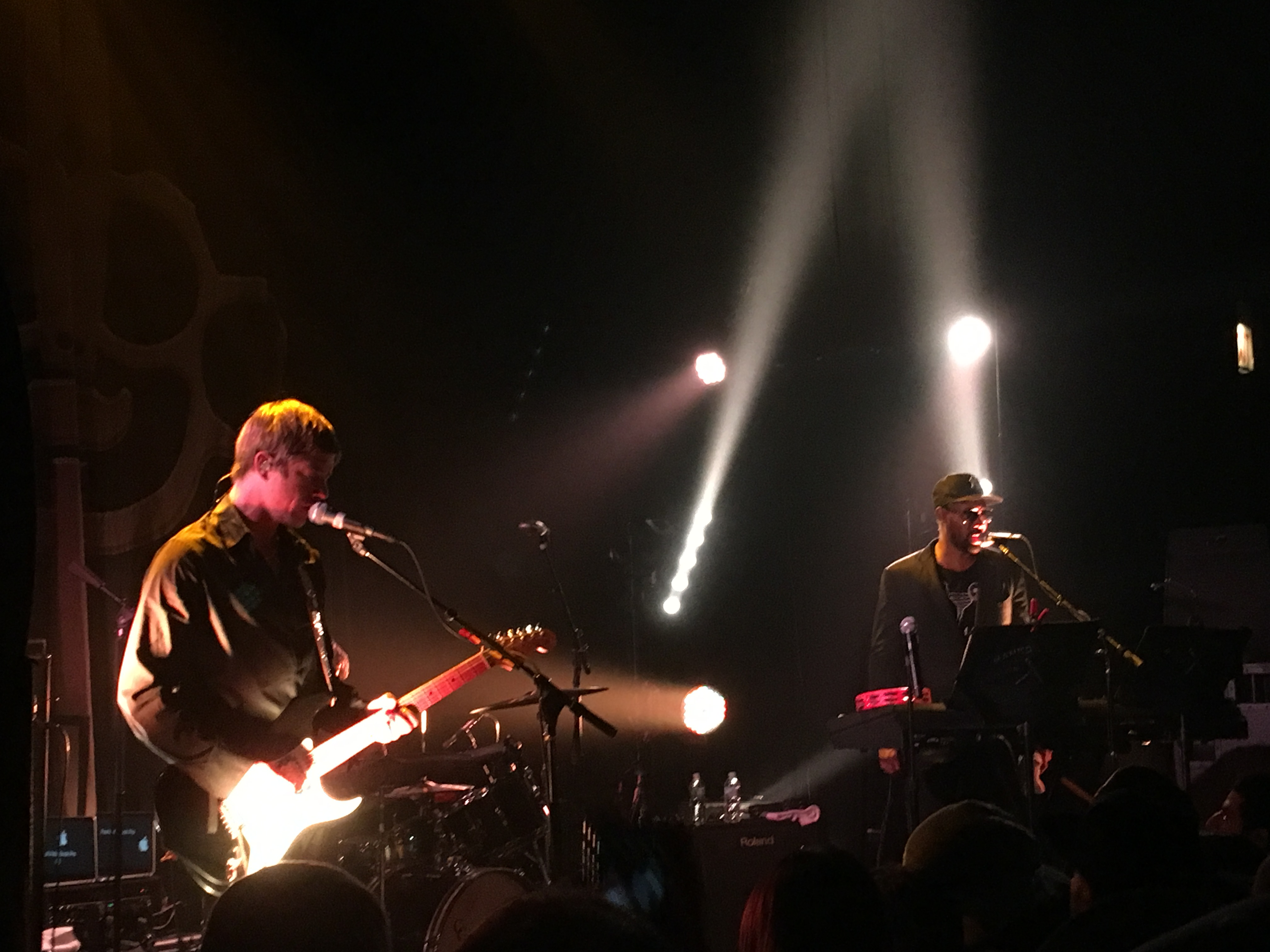
- Banks & Steelz performing at Lincoln Hall, Chicago in 2016

Background information
- Origin: New York City, U.S.
- Genre: East Coast hip hop
- Years active: 2011–2017
- Label: Warner Bros.
- Spinoff of: Wu Tang Clan, Interpol
- Past members: Paul Banks; RZA

Banks & Steelz is a musical collaboration between Interpol frontman Paul Banks and Wu-Tang Clan rapper RZA. The duo began making music together in 2011 and began recording a full album in 2013. They released their debut studio album, Anything but Words, on August 26, 2016.

== History ==
=== Early stages and recording (2011–2015) ===
The duo first began recording music together in 2011, and a demo was created; Banks had provided vocals for a beat created by RZA. During this time, however, the two were not planning on making an album together. RZA later regarded them as just "buddies playing chess" (they had played chess together at the time) who sometimes made music. Their demos caught the attention of an A&R, which is when they began recording longer compositions for an album. The duo began work on an album in 2013, which is when the first public mention of their collaboration was made, during an interview that RZA had with Rolling Stone. In this interview, he explained that when his manager asked for who he would like to work with musically, he responded with Banks, saying that he "just has an energy about him" and that if they were to combine their musical talents, "it [would] be great". RZA expected the album to take about a year to finish. During 2014, Banks' main project Interpol were recording their fifth album, El Pintor. The album was released in September 2014. Banks and RZA were planning on releasing their album in 2015, but decided that it was unfinished.

=== Anything but Words (2016–2017) ===
On May 18, 2016, it was announced that the duo, under the name Banks & Steelz, would release music later that year. The duo's first single, "Love + War", featuring fellow Wu-Tang Clan member Ghostface Killah, premiered on the Apple Music radio station Beats 1 the following day. A video for the song, which pays tribute to a scene from the film Reservoir Dogs, was released on May 20. On June 9, it was announced that the duo would be releasing their debut studio album, Anything but Words, on August 26, 2016 through Warner Bros. Records. A song from the album, titled "Giant", was premiered on Beats 1 on the same day. Also announced on that day were dates for a tour across the United States. On July 14, the duo released "Speedway Sonora" as the album's third single. "Sword in the Stone", featuring rapper Kool Keith, was released as the album's fourth single on July 28 and "Anything but Words" was released as the fifth single on August 12.

In May 2017, Banks and Steelz released the non-album single "Who Needs The World".

== Discography ==
=== Studio albums ===
List of studio albums
Title	Album details	Peak chart positions		
Title	Album details	US	US Heat	UK Rַ&B
Anything but Words	Released: August 26, 2016; Label: Warner Bros.; Formats: CD, digital download, vinyl	186	4	18

=== Singles ===
Title	Year	UK Sales	Album
"Love and War" (featuring Ghostface Killah)	2016	—	Anything but Words
"Giant"	2016	—	Anything but Words
"Speedway Sonora"	2016	—	Anything but Words
"Sword in the Stone" (featuring Kool Keith)	2016	—	Anything but Words
"Anything but Words"	2016	—	Anything but Words
"Wild Season" (featuring Florence Welch)	2017	74	Anything but Words
"Who Needs the World"	2017	—	—N/a
