= RZA =

American rapper and record producer (born 1969)

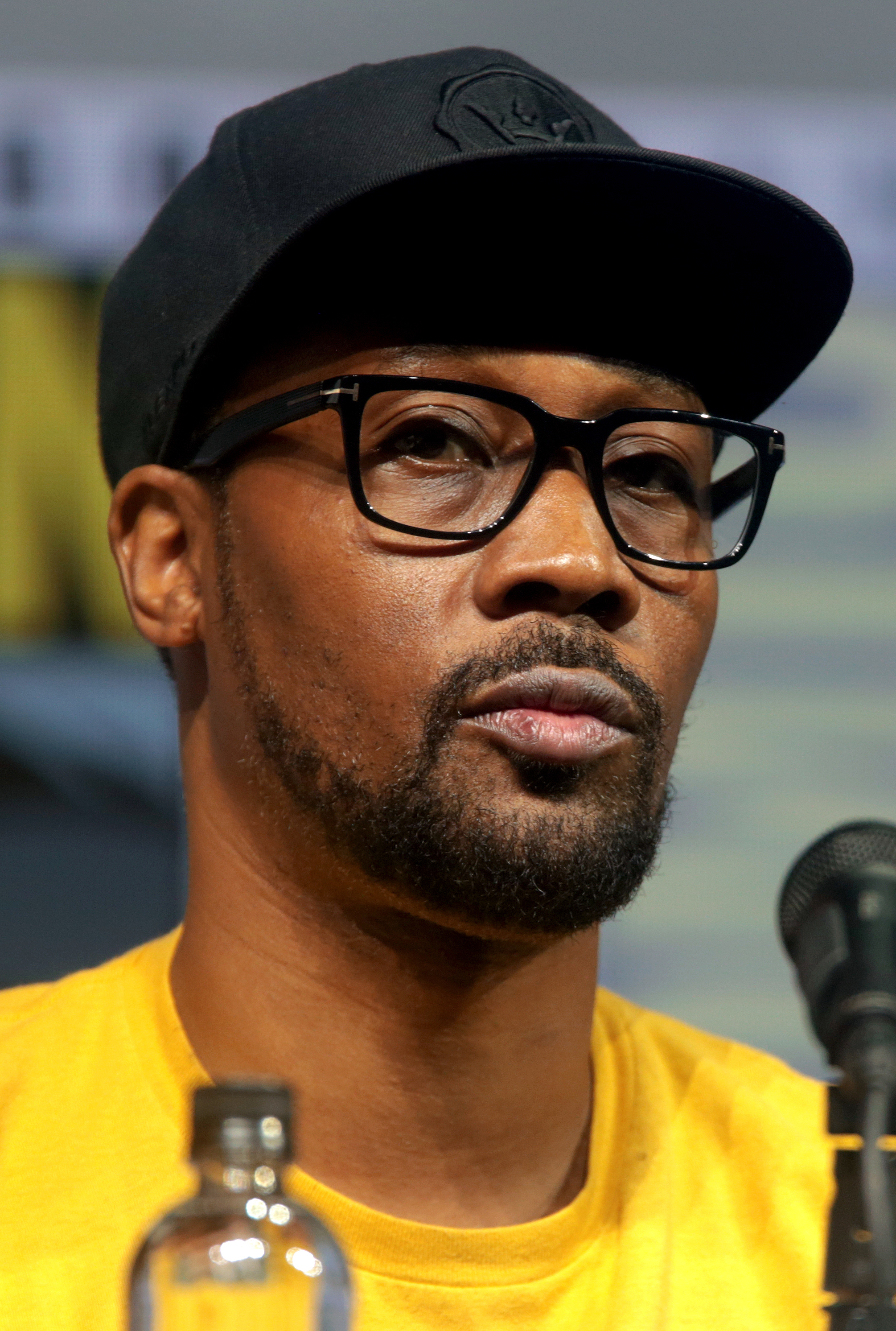
- RZA at the 2018 San Diego Comic-Con
- Born: Robert Fitzgerald Diggs; July 5, 1969 (age 57); New York City, U.S.
- Occupations: Rapper; songwriter; composer; actor; filmmaker; record producer; record executive
- Years active: 1984–present
- Spouses: Eboni Mills (m. 2000; div. 2006); Talani Rabb (m. 2009)
- Children: 7
- Relatives: 9th Prince (brother); GZA (cousin); Ol' Dirty Bastard (cousin); Flavor Flav (cousin)
- Musical career
- Also known as: Prince Rakeem; The Scientist; Bobby Steels; Ruler Zig-Zag-Zig Allah; Prince Delight; (The) Abbott; Bobby Digital; Bobby Dynamite; RZArector; Bobby Boulders
- Genres: East Coast hip-hop; hardcore hip-hop; chipmunk soul; horrorcore
- Works: RZA discography; production discography
- Labels: Soul Temple; Tommy Boy; Warner Bros.; Razor Sharp; Epic; SME; Virgin; EMI; Koch; Gee Street; V2; BMG; Sanctuary
- Member of: Wu-Tang Clan
- Formerly of: Achozen; Banks & Steelz; Gravediggaz

Robert Fitzgerald Diggs (born July 5, 1969), better known by his stage name RZA (/ˈrɪzə/ RIZ-ə) or the RZA, is an American rapper, record producer, composer, actor, and filmmaker. He is the de facto leader of the hip-hop group Wu-Tang Clan, having produced most of the group's albums and those of its members. Known for his signature use of soul samples, sparse beats, and cinematic elements, his production style has been widely influential in hip-hop. The Source and Vibe both ranked him among the greatest hip-hop producers of all time, while NME included him on its list of the 50 Greatest Producers Ever, spanning all genres.

RZA has released solo albums under the alter-ego Bobby Digital; he was also a founding member of the horrorcore group Gravediggaz, performing as the RZArector. He has also worked extensively in film and television, composing scores for major films such as Kill Bill: Volume 1 (2003) and Kill Bill: Volume 2 (2004). He made his directorial debut with The Man with the Iron Fists (2012) and later directed Love Beats Rhymes (2017). He served as an executive producer on Wu-Tang: An American Saga (2019–2023), for which he received a Primetime Emmy Award nomination for Outstanding Original Main Title Theme Music.

As an actor, he has appeared in American Gangster (2007), G.I. Joe: Retaliation (2013), and A Very Harold & Kumar 3D Christmas (2011), as well as the TV series Californication. He has also done voiceover work, including roles in The Simpsons and Minions: The Rise of Gru (2022).

== Early life ==
Diggs was born on July 5, 1969, in Brownsville, Brooklyn. He was named after the Kennedy brothers, Robert and John Fitzgerald, both of whom his mother greatly admired. Diggs has called his given name an "honorable" name, given the legacy of both Robert and John. Diggs has a younger brother, Terrance Hamlin, better known as the rapper 9th Prince, and an older brother named Mitchell "Divine" Diggs.

From ages three to seven, Diggs spent summers in North Carolina with his uncle, who encouraged him to read and study. Diggs was introduced to hip-hop music at the age of nine; by eleven, he was competing in rap battles. He relocated to Steubenville, Ohio, in 1990, to live with his mother. Diggs spent weekends in Pittsburgh, Pennsylvania, where his father ran a convenience store in the city's Hill District.

Diggs got involved with petty crime and drug-dealing, and was charged with attempted murder while in Steubenville. He was acquitted of the charge, giving him what he has called a "second chance".

== Music career ==
=== Before the Wu-Tang Clan ===
Diggs first became interested in making his own hip-hop music in 1979 when a friend of his introduced him to Rapper's Delight by The Sugarhill Gang. In 1981, Diggs formed a rap group with his cousins Russell Jones, then known as The Specialist, and Gary Grice, then known as Allah Justice, called "Force of the Imperial Master", which they soon after renamed as "All in Together Now" in 1984. Around this time Diggs formed the DMD Posse which consisted of RZA, Raekwon, Ghostface Killah, U-God, Inspectah Deck, 4th Disciple and Method Man. Diggs and Grice then signed with Jamaica Records for management purposes and Jamaica convinced Tommy Boy Records to sign Diggs as a solo artist in 1989 under the name Prince Rakeem. He released the original Ooh I Love You Rakeem promotion version of the EP, but was forced to remix and rerelease the single when Tommy Boy failed to acquire the rights to the original sample. The rereleased version underperformed commercially, and Diggs was subsequently dropped by Tommy Boy.

=== 1992–1993: Forming the Wu-Tang Clan ===
After a shoot-out in Ohio in 1992, he faced eight years in jail. "When they said 'not guilty', my face stuck in a smile for three days," he recalled. "I was just walking around town, thinking about my daughter and my wife. Right then I said goodbye to anything that would put me in that situation again. I was up on trial on an attempted murder charge. I was a motherfucking fool, with all that knowledge in my head and ending up there." In 1992, Diggs formed a new group with his two cousins and five other childhood friends. They named the group Wu-Tang Clan, after the 1983 kung fu film Shaolin and Wu Tang. As part of the group's formation, each member chose a new nickname for themselves. Diggs chose "RZA", based on a nickname he had been given by fans of his music, "Rza Rza Rakeem", which in turn was based on a song by All in Together Now, "Pza Pza Pumpin", as well as Diggs' graffiti tag, "Razor". He created a backronym for "RZA", stating that the name stood for "Ruler, Zig-Zag-Zig, Allah" which further translated into "Ruler, Knowledge-Wisdom-Understanding, Allah" when using the Supreme Alphabet.

Wu-Tang Clan released its first single, "Protect Ya Neck", in December 1992. Masta Killa then joined the group in 1993, becoming its ninth member. They released their debut album, Enter the Wu-Tang (36 Chambers) in November 1993. RZA operated as Wu-Tang Clan's de facto leader, producing the group's songs and deciding who would get placed on which tracks.

=== 1994–1996: Gravediggaz and Wu-Tang solo projects: Round one ===
As each of the group's members embarked on solo careers, RZA continued to produce nearly everything Wu-Tang released during the period 1994–1996, which included both composing and arranging the instrumental tracks as well as overseeing and directing the creative process. RZA's rule over the Clan at this time is described in 2004's Wu-Tang Manual book as "a dictatorship". He also released a hit single of his own, in the form of "Wu-Wear: The Garment Renaissance". The song was featured on the High School High soundtrack, and was released to promote the Wu-Tang clothing brand, also called "Wu-Wear". It peaked at No. 60 on the Billboard Hot 100, and No. 6 on the Hot Rap Singles chart.

When it came time for the Gravediggaz, Prince Paul was thinking about putting a group together. He wanted to get some good MCs. Poetic was another dope MC who was underrated out on Long Island. He had one single out on Tommy Boy that didn't take off, but he was a dope MC. As the Grym Reaper, you know how many dope lyrics he dropped. Frukwan, one of the top lyricists out of Stetsasonic. He and Paul were friends already. He told him about me. He said, "I know this one guy who is super-dope." At the same time, I was also trying to do Wu-Tang. I was trying to start my own company and stuff, so when Paul called me up and invited me to his crib on Long Island and told me his idea for forming this group, I thought it would be an honor to be in a group with him. But I told him, "I'm also producing a group, and I'm also part of a family that I'm building." He said, "Yo, that's crazy." We would talk a lot of times. [Ol' Dirty Bastard] came to his house a lot of times with me. [Method Man], too. We all would just go there and try to find ways to get out of the streets. Me, I was trying to get out of the ghetto. Paul had a lot of respect for me, so he helped me break out of it. I think he liked that I was so dark, but I didn't know I was dark.

=== 1997: Wu-Tang Forever ===
1997 saw the release of Wu-Tang Forever, the Wu-Tang Clan's highly anticipated second album. The album for the first time featured RZA delegating a small number of beat-making duties to other producers in the Wu-Tang camp, such as his protégés Mathematics, True Master and 4th Disciple who are known as the original Wu-Elements, and Clan member Inspectah Deck.

=== 1998–1999: Gravediggaz and Wu-Tang solo projects: Round two ===
During the 1998–2000 period RZA ceased to produce every Wu-Tang solo album as he had done previously, but continued to contribute usually one or two songs on average to each record as well as receiving an Executive Producer credit.

=== 2001–2004: Post The W solo projects ===
In 1999, the RZA moved into composing film scores. His first work, Jim Jarmusch's Ghost Dog: The Way of the Samurai (1999), earned praise; he also had a brief cameo in the film itself, as a fellow samurai wearing camouflage. The experience was positive and, as he noted during an interview on National Public Radio's Fresh Air, the work with traditional musicians gave him the desire to learn how to read and write music. In 2004, he co-scored David S. Goyer's "Blade: Trinity" with composer Ramin Djawadi.

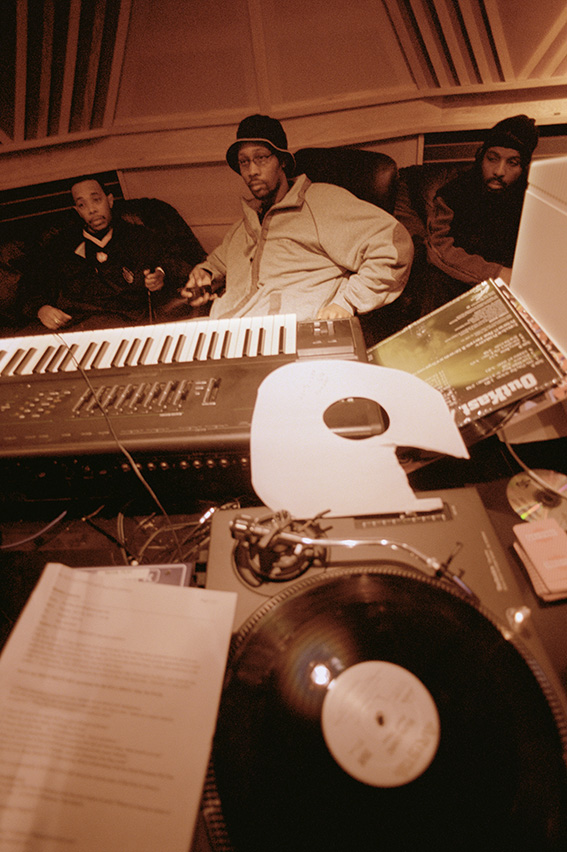
RZA in the Studio with U-God and Prodigal Sunn (2002)

=== 2005–present: Solo projects: Round three ===
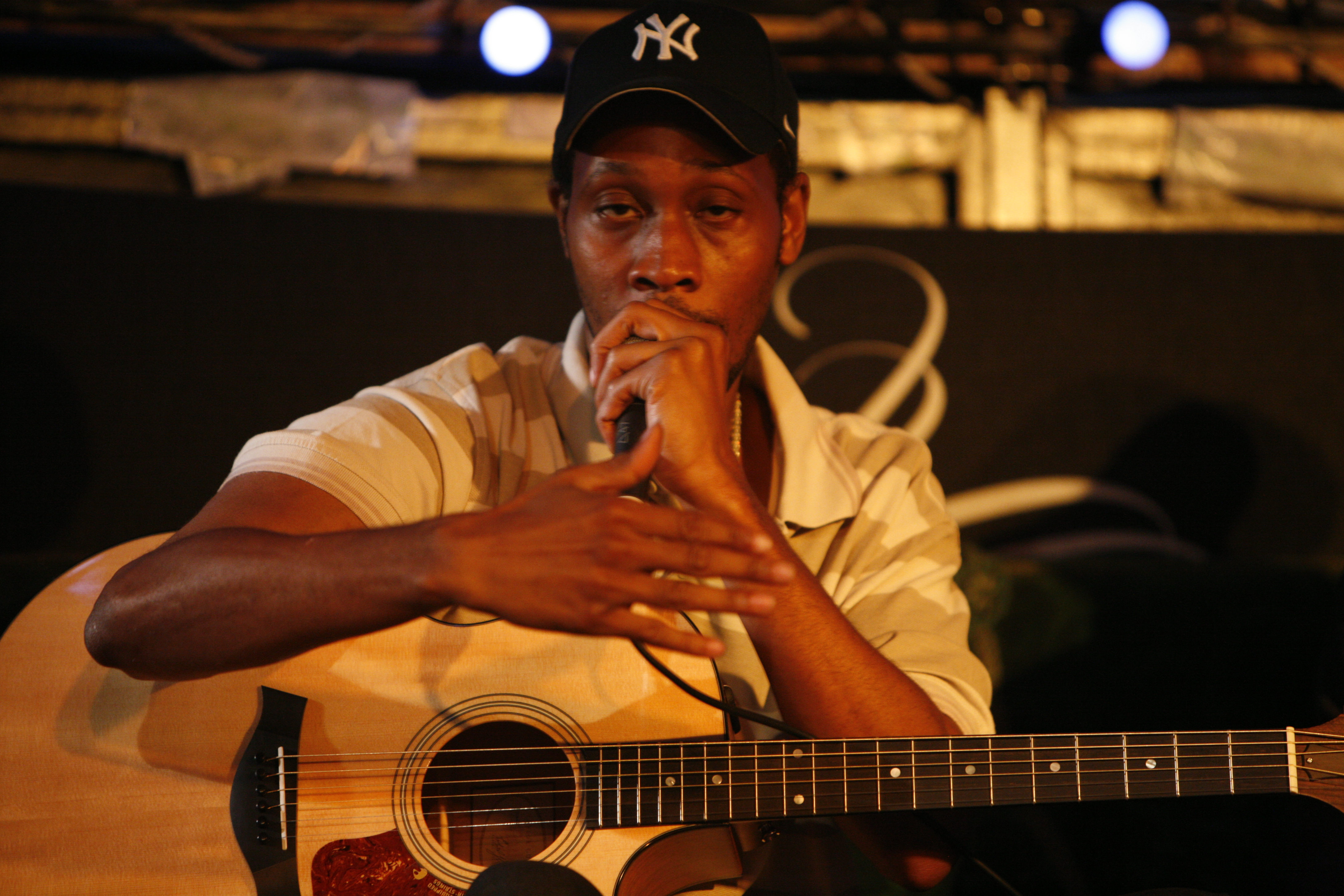
RZA at the 2007 Eurockéennes

He has also stated that the long-delayed The Cure album will be his final solo album, so that he can devote more time to his movie directing career.

Before signing with SRC Records in 2007, RZA was flooded with offers from Bad Boy Records, Aftermath Records, Interscope and Def Jam among others for the Wu-Tang Clan super-group.

In 2007, he produced the score of the Japanese anime Afro Samurai starring Samuel L. Jackson. In 2007 he released the little-publicized instrumental album The RZA-Instrumental Experience, and worked with Raekwon on his highly anticipated Only Built 4 Cuban Linx II. From 2005 to 2008 he collaborated with System of a Down bassist Shavo Odadjian on the project Achozen The group released two singles, one of which, "Deuces", was included in the 2009 film Babylon A.D. The group also recorded an album that has remained unreleased, although eight of the songs were released in 2015.

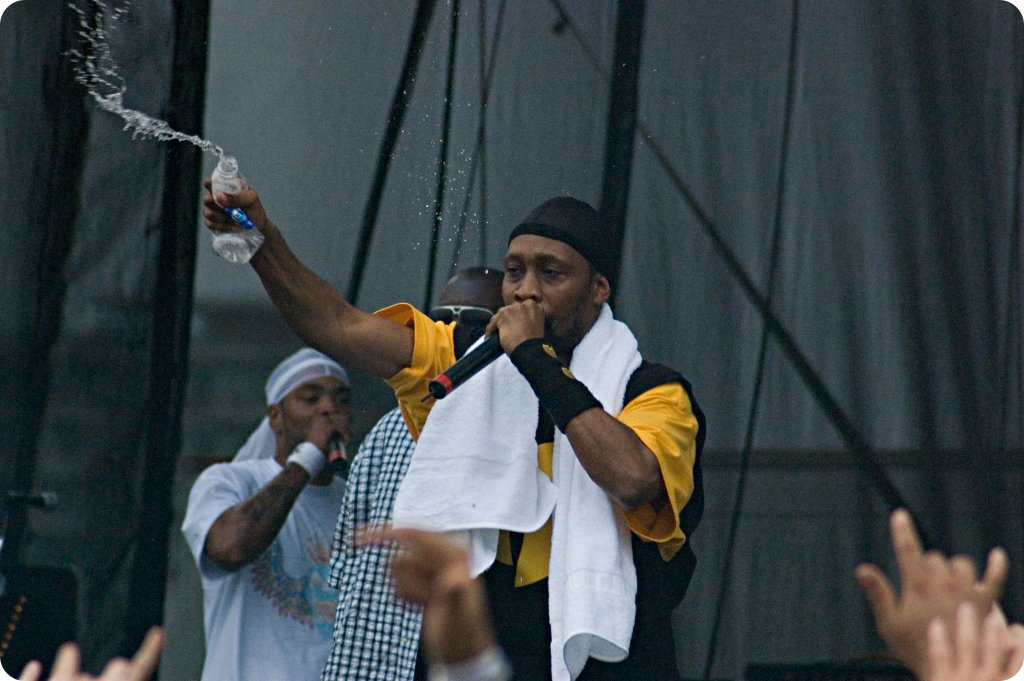
RZA performing with Wu-Tang at the Virgin Music Festival

"The time is right to bring some older material to the masses digitally. Our fans have been dedicated and patient, and they're hungry to hear the music that has set us apart from so many others. Hip-hop is alive in Wu Music, and with The Orchard, we've got a solid partner that understands our audience and is committed to doing all they can to help us reach the fans. I'm definitely looking forward to working with them to see what else we all come up with. There's much more to come."

In 2010 he worked on what was intended as a solo album for GZA, Liquid Swords II, but the album remains unreleased. RZA also worked with Kanye West on the latter's fifth album, My Beautiful Dark Twisted Fantasy, as well as Watch the Throne by Kanye and Jay-Z.

In a 2011 interview, RZA revealed that he had recently decided to clean out his beat machines of instrumentals he made for the Wu-Tang Clan that were never used; as a result, he gave away ten beats each to Nas, Busta Rhymes and Talib Kweli, as well as 20 beats for Kanye West, including two that were used on West's previous two albums. RZA produced UK artist Josh Osho's 2012 debut album L.I.F.E.

RZA also contributed vocals to three songs on John Frusciante's 2012 EP Letur-Lefr and in 2013 he contributed vocals to one song on Kid Cudi's 2013 album Indicud. In August 2012 RZA founded a new record label, Soul Temple Records, with a distribution deal from RED Distribution. On September 28, 2012, he hosted one episode of the web series Equals Three, substituting for regular host Ray William Johnson. He appeared on Earl Sweatshirt's album Doris, contributing a verse on the track "Molasses". Despite artistic disagreements with Raekwon, RZA and The Wu-Tang Clan released their sixth album A Better Tomorrow in 2014.

In 2013, RZA and Paul Banks began to collaborate as Banks & Steelz for what became the 2016 album Anything But Words. Guest appearances include Kool Keith, Ghostface Killah, Method Man, and Masta Killa. Two singles were released from the album, "Love + War" and "Giant". RZA collaborated with Ramin Djawadi, with whom he co-scored Blade Trinity and Blake Perlman for the song "Drift" for the Guillermo del Toro film "Pacific Rim".

In June 2020, ice cream company Good Humor approached RZA to create a new jingle for ice cream trucks to play, to replace the tune "Turkey in the Straw", long associated with minstrel shows that often featured racist lyrics. (Good Humor does not directly operate any trucks, but the company wanted to encourage ice cream truck drivers to not play the song.) RZA's resulting composition was released in August 2020.

In a 2020 interview, RZA discussed how being stuck at home during the COVID global crisis resulted in him resuming work on his long-unreleased The Cure album.

In August 2024, RZA released the album A Ballet Through Mud, an orchestral ballet score. The score was conceived during the COVID-19 pandemic based on a notebook of lyrics RZA had written as a teenager. Before being released as an album, the score premiered in 2023 on stage through a performance by the Colorado Symphony.

== Wu-Recording labels ==
Since the early 1990s, various Wu Tang Clan-affiliated recording labels were established. The earlier labels are believed to be dissolved. The connection that RZA had to these labels is unknown.

Other record labels were later founded in the early 2000s, and are still active in the present. Very little is known about these labels, other than the fact that RZA produces music on them. It is unknown if RZA is CEO, or has high position within these labels, considering that he was never known to have a CEO position of any recording label.

- Wu-Tang Records
- Razor Sharp Records
- 36 Chambers Records and Wu Music Group
- Protect Ya Neck Records
- Wu-Tang International
- Soul Temple Records

== Artistry ==
RZA's production technique, specifically the manner of chopping up and/or speeding or slowing soul samples to fit his beats, has been imitated by hip-hop producers including Kanye West and Just Blaze. West's own take on RZA's style briefly flooded the rap market with what was dubbed "chipmunk soul," the speeding of a vocal sample to where it sounded as though the singer had inhaled helium. Several producers at the time copied the style, creating other offshoots. West has admitted that his style was distinctly influenced by the RZA's production, saying

"Wu-Tang? Me and my friends talk about this all the time... We think Wu-Tang had one of the biggest impacts as far as a movement. From slang to style of dress, skits, the samples. Similar to the [production] style I use, RZA has been doing that."

In response, RZA himself has spoken quite positively of the comparisons:

"All good. I got super respect for Kanye. He came up to me about a year or two ago. He gave me mad praising and blessings... For people to say Wu-Tang inspire Kanye, Kanye is one of the biggest artists in the world. That goes back to what we say: 'Wu-Tang is forever.' Kanye is going to inspire people to be like him."

After hearing Kanye's work on The Blueprint, RZA claimed that a torch-passing had occurred between him and West, saying, "The shoes gotta be filled. If you ain't gonna do it, somebody else is gonna do it. That's how I feel about rap today."

His Bobby Digital albums introduced tweaked-out new age elements to his sound; these have incorporated themselves more fully into his beats on newer albums such as Method Man's 4:21... The Day After.

"The way I produce now is I produce more like a musician", RZA said. "In the old days, I produced more like a DJ. I didn't understand music theory at all. Now that I do understand music theory, I make my music more playable, meaning not only could you listen to it, you could get someone else to play it. Before, you couldn't even write down Wu-Tang music. I think almost 80 percent of this record can be duplicated by a band, which is important for music, because that means 10 years from now, somebody can make a whole song out of it and cover it like how I'm covering The Beatles song."

In a 2010 radio interview with UK hip-hop station Conspiracy Worldwide Radio, RZA spoke in great detail about the homemade, candid ethos of much of his work, including the organic creation process behind ODB's debut album.

=== Alter egos ===
RZA is known for having multiple aliases, for different lyrical styles and personalities: Prince Rakeem, The Abbot, Bobby Digital, Bobby Steels, the Scientist, Prince Delight, Prince Dynamite, Ruler Zig-Zag-Zig Allah. During his time with the Gravediggaz, he went by the name the RZArector, which is for waking up the mentally dead.

== Film career ==
=== Acting ===
RZA has had cameo appearances in films including Funny People, Due Date, Gospel Hill, Ghost Dog, Life Is Hot in Cracktown and Popstar: Never Stop Never Stopping.

RZA appeared in Derailed, Coffee and Cigarettes, and American Gangster. He appeared in G.I. Joe: Retaliation, as the character Blind Master. In 2010, RZA appeared in the science fiction action film Repo Men. In 2014, RZA took on the role of Tremaine Alexander in the film Brick Mansions opposite Paul Walker and David Belle, a remake of District 13. He played "Mr. L.C.", the main antagonist, in the Thai martial arts film Tom Yum Goong 2.

RZA directed and starred in The Man with the Iron Fists (2012).

In 2013, RZA provided guest voices in the sixth season episode of Robot Chicken. "Botched Jewel Heist", in three sketches. His first role is an anthropomorphic strawberry who is shot dead in a mob hit, causing his jelly blood to splatter onto a large slice of bread below (which was covered in the peanut-butter blood of Mr. Peanut, who was killed the same way moments before). In his second role, he plays himself, and raps about being a pescetarian, although RZA had shifted from a pescetarian diet to a vegan diet in 1997. His third role was as the Halloween Road Warrior in a sketch where in a post-apocalyptic world, a family is pursued by road warriors representing forgotten holidays, who aim to kidnap their two children.

RZA played the role of Samurai Apocalypse in the television series Californication in 9 episodes.

RZA played the supporting role of Shotgun Steve in the romantic action comedy film Mr. Right with Sam Rockwell and Anna Kendrick.

RZA portrayed Dean in the 2019 film The Dead Don't Die.

RZA narrates a character, known as Wesley, on the 2019 Netflix original series Day Break in Season 1, episode 5 named "Homecoming Redux or My So Called Stunt Double Life".

RZA portrayed Harry Mansell, brother of the protagonist, in the 2021 action film Nobody with Bob Odenkirk, Connie Nielsen, and Christopher Lloyd. He reprised the role in the 2025 sequel Nobody 2.

=== Filmmaking ===
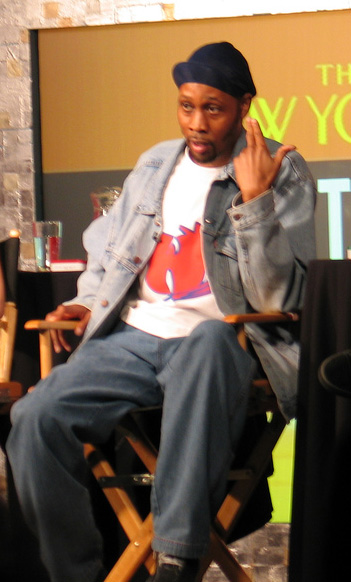
RZA at The New Yorker Festival in 2005

I made my albums like movies, you know what I mean? I wanted people to be able to listen to a movie in their car while they was driving. "I want to start off making movies where people will know they're at a movie. Like my man Tarantino, he did that movie Pulp Fiction – classic movie, man. Every time it comes on TV or cable, I have to stop and watch it. And it's based on nothing, really. There's only a few people out there that are able to do that, where it comes from nothing but the vision and imagination of the artist.

In the late 1990s, RZA began production of a feature-length film based on "Bobby Digital", an alias he used on various albums. Though the film was never completed, he continued shooting music videos for his side projects and solo tracks.

RZA directed his first feature film, The Man with the Iron Fists, in 2011, from a script he wrote the previous year. Directors Quentin Tarantino and Eli Roth were involved in production, writing, and casting according to several movie websites. The film was released in fall 2012.

== Personal life ==
RZA is the brother of 9th Prince, and the cousin of rappers GZA, Ol' Dirty Bastard, and Flavor Flav.

RZA provided the afterword to See You at San Diego: An Oral History of Comic-Con, Fandom, and the Triumph of Geek Culture. His hobbies include watching martial arts films, and he is considered an "encyclopedia of martial arts films" due to his knowledge of the genre. RZA met and befriended Shaolin Monk Shi Yan Ming after being introduced by Ol' Dirty Bastard's manager Sophia Chang. His favorite films include Five Deadly Venoms, The 36th Chamber of Shaolin, Ninja Scroll, and Fist of the North Star. His second well-known hobby is chess. He is a Director of Development and champion of the Hip-Hop Chess Federation.

RZA is a vegan and has promoted the vegan lifestyle and compassion for animals on behalf of PETA. Until 1997, he was a pescetarian; "I tell you one thing I did use to like: the fish and chips," he stated. "But I stopped eating fish this year. One day I just felt the death in it."

RZA is a resident of Millstone Township, New Jersey.

RZA was a former member of the Five-Percent Nation, until he & Cappadonna accompanied childhood friend & president of 36 Chambers Tareef Michael to Mecca in January 2024 and reverted to Islam in the Masjid al-Haram.

== Discography ==
=== Studio albums ===
- Bobby Digital in Stereo (1998)
- Digital Bullet (2001)
- Birth of a Prince (2003)
- Digi Snacks (2008)
- Bobby Digital and The Pit of Snakes (2022)

=== Collaboration albums ===
- 6 Feet Deep with Gravediggaz (1994)
- The Pick, the Sickle and the Shovel with Gravediggaz (1997)
- Anything But Words with Banks & Steelz (2016)
- Saturday Afternoon Kung Fu Theater with DJ Scratch (2022)
- A Ballet Through Mud with Colorado Symphony and Christopher Dragon (2024)

== Filmography ==
Key
†	Denotes films that have not yet been released

=== Films ===
Year	Title	Role	Notes
1997	Rhyme & Reason	Himself	
1999	Ghost Dog: The Way of the Samurai	Samurai in Camouflage	
2003	Coffee and Cigarettes	RZA	
2005	Derailed	Winston Boyko	
2006	Rap Sheet: Hip-Hop and the Cops	Himself	
2006	The Lather Effect	Danny's Friend	
2006	Rock the Bells	Himself	
2007	American Gangster	Moses Jones	
2007	The Box	Duece	
2008	Gospel Hill	Lonnie	
2009	Funny People	Chuck	
2009	Life Is Hot in Cracktown	Samy	
2010	Repo Men	T-Bone	
2010	Due Date	Airline Screening Marshall	
2010	The Next Three Days	Mouss	
2011	A Very Harold & Kumar 3D Christmas	Lamar	
2012	The Man with the Iron Fists	Blacksmith	Lead actor, director, and co-writer
2013	G.I. Joe: Retaliation	Blind Master	
2013	Tom Yum Goong 2	Mr. LC	AKA The Protector 2
2014	Brick Mansions	Tremaine Alexander	
2015	The Man with the Iron Fists 2	Blacksmith	Lead actor and co-writer
2015	Mr. Right	Steven	
2015	AWOL-72	Det. Adams	
2016	Popstar: Never Stop Never Stopping	Himself	
2017	Love Beats Rhymes		Director
2018	Thriller	Principal Hurd	Lead actor, executive producer and composer
2018	Mutafukaz	Shakespeare (voice)	
2019	The Dead Don't Die	Dean	
2020	Cut Throat City		Director
2020	Life in a Year	Ron	
2020	Hard Luck Love Song	Louis	
2021	Nobody	Harry Mansell Jr.	
2021	Clean	Pawn Shop Kurtis	
2021	King of Cool	Himself	
2022	Minions: The Rise of Gru	Biker (voice)	
2022	Poker Face	Andrew Johnson	
2023	Problemista	Bobby	
2023	Not an Artist	The Abbott	
2025	One Spoon of Chocolate	—N/a	Director, producer, writer, and co-composer, credited as Robert Diggs for producing
2025	Nobody 2	Harry Mansell Jr.	
2026	V/H/S/Mixtape	—N/a	Director and writer (segment "Death Tone")
TBA	Blood Brothers †	—N/a	Director and writer
TBA	Me and My Girlfriend †	Marceo	
TBA	The Prophet Sees †		
TBA	Tangled Up in Blue †		Post-production

=== Television ===
Year	Title	Role	Notes
2004	America's Next Top Model	Himself	Season 2, Episode 7
2009	Afro Samurai: Resurrection	DJ (voice)	
2010	Outlaw	Greg Beals	Episode: "Pilot"
2012	Californication	Samurai Apocalypse	Featured role (nine episodes)
2013	Robot Chicken	Himself/Strawberry/Halloween Road Warrior (voice)	Episode: "Botched Jewel Heist"
2014	Gang Related	DEA Agent Cassius Green	Main cast
2017	The Simpsons	Himself (voice)	Episode: "The Great Phatsby: Part 2"
2017	Marvel's Iron Fist		Director (episode: "Immortal Emerges from Cave")
2017	Snowfall	Swim	Episode: "Cracking"
2018	Fresh Off the Boat	Himself	Cameo, episode: "Measure Twice, Cut Once"
2019	Daybreak	Himself (voice)	Episode: "Homecoming Redux or My So Called Stunt Double Life"
2019	Wu-Tang: An American Saga		Executive producer
2022	The Tiny Chef Show	Himself	Episode: "Lemonade"

=== Video games ===
Year	Game	Role	Notes
1999	Wu-Tang: Shaolin Style	Himself	Voice over
2005	Marc Ecko's Getting Up: Contents Under Pressure	Stake	Voice over

== Awards and nominations ==
Year	Nominee / work	Award	Result
1996	Return to the 36 Chambers: The Dirty Version	Grammy Award for Best Rap Album	Nominated
1998	Wu-Tang Forever	Grammy Award for Best Rap Album	Nominated
2004	Kill Bill: Volume 1	BAFTA Award for Best Original Music	Nominated
2008	American Gangster	Screen Actors Guild Award for Outstanding Performance by a Cast in a Motion Picture	Nominated
2020	Wu-Tang: An American Saga	Primetime Emmy Award for Outstanding Original Main Title Theme Music	Nominated

== Bibliography ==
- The Wu-Tang Manual (2005)
- The Tao of Wu (2009)
