= Ooh I Love You Rakeem =

EP by Prince Rakeem
- Released: July 1, 1991
- Recorded: 1991
- Genre: East Coast hip-hop
- Length: 26:12
- Label: Tommy Boy; Warner Bros.
- Producer: Prince Rakeem & Easy Mo Bee

RZA chronology
Ooh I Love You Rakeem (1991)	Bobby Digital in Stereo (1998)

Ooh I Love You Rakeem is an extended play that Robert Diggs released on Tommy Boy Records in 1991 under the name Prince Rakeem. Diggs is best known as RZA, the de facto leader and primary producer of Wu-Tang Clan. Prince Rakeem was dropped by the label following the poor commercial performance of the record.

== Track listing ==
No.	Title	Producer(s)	Length
1.	"Ooh We Love You Rakeem" (Baggin' Ladies Mix)	Prince Rakeem	4:17
2.	"Ooh We Love You Rakeem" (Baggin' Ladies Instrumental)	Prince Rakeem	4:17
3.	"Deadly Venoms" (Vocals Up)	Prince Rakeem	4:25
4.	"Sexcapades" (DMD Mix)	Easy Mo Bee, Prince Rakeem (co.)	4:13
5.	"Sexcapades" (Wu-Tang Mix)	Easy Mo Bee, Prince Rakeem (co.)	4:13
6.	"Sexcapades" (DMD Radio Mix)	Easy Mo Bee, Prince Rakeem (co.)	4:13
7.	"Sexcapades" (DMD Instrumental)	Easy Mo Bee, Prince Rakeem (co.)	0:30
8.	"Sexcapades" (Wu-Tang Instrumental)	Easy Mo Bee, Prince Rakeem (co.)	0:30
