= U-God discography =

This is the discography of American rapper U-God.

== Discography ==
=== Studio albums ===
List of studio albums, with selected chart positions, sales figures and certifications
Title	Album details	Peak chart positions		
Title	Album details	US	US R&B	US Rap
Golden Arms Redemption	Released: October 5, 1999 (US); Label: Priority Records; Formats: CD, LP, Cassette, digital download	58	15	—
Mr. Xcitement	Released: September 13, 2005 (US); Label: Free Agency Recordings; Formats: CD, digital download	—	—	—
Dopium	Released: June 23, 2009 (US); Label: Frank Radio, Babygrande Records; Formats: CD, digital download	—	93	—
The Keynote Speaker	Released: July 23, 2013 (US); Label: Soul Temple Records; Formats: CD, LP, digital download	—	57	40
Venom	Released: March 30, 2018; Label: Babygrande Records; Formats: CD, digital download	—	—	—
"—" denotes a title that did not chart, or was not released in that territory.

=== Other ===
List of collaborative studio albums, with selected chart positions
Title	Album details	Peak chart positions		
Title	Album details	US	US R&B	US Rap
U-Godzilla Presents the Hillside Scramblers (with The Hillside Scramblers)	Released: 2004; Label: Synergy Music; Formats CD, digital download	—	—	—
Bring Back God	Released: 2009; Label: Self Released	—	—	—
"—" denotes a title that did not chart, or was not released in that territory.

=== Singles ===
List of singles, with selected chart positions and certifications, showing year released and album name
Title	Year	Peak chart positions			Album
Title	Year	US	US R&B	US Rap	Album
"Dat's Gangsta"	1999	—	—	—	Golden Arms Redemption
"Bizarre"	2000	—	—	7	Golden Arms Redemption
"Supa Nigga"	2002	—	—	—	—
"Wildstyle Superfreak"	2002	—	—	—	—
"Bump"	2005	—	—	—	Mr. Xcitement
"You Don't Want to Dance"	2005	—	—	—	Mr. Xcitement
"Takem Home"	2007	—	—	—	—
"Train Trussle" (featuring Ghostface Killah and Scotty Wotty)	2009	—	—	—	Dopium
"Wu-Tang" (featuring Method Man)	2009	—	—	—	Dopium
"—" denotes a recording that did not chart or was not released in that territory.

=== Guest appearances ===
List of non-single guest appearances, with other performing artists, showing year released and album name
Title	Year	Other artist(s)	Album
"Knuckleheadz"	1995	Raekwon, Ghostface Killah	Only Built 4 Cuban Linx...
"Killa Hill Niggaz"	1995	Cypress Hill, RZA	Cypress Hill III: Temples of Boom
"Investigative Reports"	1995	GZA, Raekwon, Ghostface Killah	Liquid Swords
"If It's Alright with You"	1996	Cappadonna	The Great White Hype (soundtrack)
"Semi-Automatic: Full Rap Metal Jacket"	1996	Inspectah Deck, Streetlife	High School High (soundtrack)
"Winter Warz"	1996	Ghostface Killah, Raekwon, Masta Killa, Cappadonna	Don't Be a Menace to South Central While Drinking Your Juice in the Hood (soundtrack) / Ironman
"Black Jesus"	1996	Ghostface Killah, Popa Wu, Raekwon	Ironman
"Supa Ninjaz"	1998	Cappadonna, Method Man	The Pillage
"Intellectuals"	1998	Sunz of Man, 60 Second Assassin, Hell Razah, Raekwon	The Last Shall Be First
"Element of Surprise"	1998	La the Darkman, Masta Killa	Heist of the Century
"Grand Prix"	1999	Inspectah Deck, Streetlife	Uncontrolled Substance
"Longevity"	1999	Inspectah Deck	Uncontrolled Substance
"Mr. Onsomeothershits"	1999	Methods of Mayhem	Methods of Mayhem
"No Exit (The Infamous Hip Rock Version)"	1999	Blondie, Inspectah Deck, Mobb Deep	No Exit 12"
"Cherchez La Ghost"	2000	Ghostface Killah, Madam	Supreme Clientele
"Militant"	2001	Killarmy	Fear, Love & War
"Industry Shakedown"	2002	Deceptikonz, Fat Joe, Masta Killa, Alchemist	Elimination
"Killa Beez"	2002	RZA, Inspectah Deck, Suga Bang Bang	The Sting
"Always NY"	2003	Mathematics, Masta Killa, Inspectah Deck, Buddah Bless, Icarus Da Don	Love, Hell & Right
"Digi Warfare"	2004	Masta Killa, RZA	No Said Date
"Rock Steady"	2004	Tony Touch, Method Man, Raekwon	The Piece Maker 2
"Break That"	2005	Mathematics, Ol' Dirty Bastard, Masta Killa	The Problem
"Spot Lite"	2005	Mathematics, Method Man, Inspectah Deck, Cappadonna	The Problem
"Still Grimey"	2005	Sean Price, Prodigal Sunn, C-Rayz Walz	Wu-Tang Meets the Indie Culture
"No More Tearz"	2006	Soular Winds	The Quiet Americans
"Lonely Dream (Hotheadz Remix)"	2006	Renee Stacey	Lonely Dream 12"
"Handle That"	2006	Inspectah Deck, Hugh Hef	The Resident Patient
"Iron God Chamber"	2006	Masta Killa, RZA, Method Man, Masta Killa	Made in Brooklyn
"The Glide"	2006	Method Man, Raekwon, La the Darkman	4:21... The Day After
"Rec Room Therapy"	2007	Ghostface Killah, Raekwon	The Big Doe Rehab
"Kill Too Hard"	2009	Inspectah Deck, Masta Ace	Wu-Tang Chamber Music
"Sound ghe Horns"	2009	Inspectah Deck, Sadat X	Wu-Tang Chamber Music
"Ghetto"	2010	Ghostface Killah, Raekwon, Cappadonna	Apollo Kids
"Never Feel This Pain"	2011	Inspectah Deck, Tre Williams	Legendary Weapons
"225 Rounds"	2011	Cappadonna, RZA, Bronze Nazareth	Legendary Weapons
"Doin' Nothin"	2013	Blu	York
"Blood on the Cobblestones"	2013	Ghostface Killah, Inspectah Deck	Twelve Reasons to Die
"Murder Spree"	2013	Ghostface Killah, Masta Killa, Inspectah Deck, Killa Sin	Twelve Reasons to Die
"Heavy Champagne"	2013	Kool Keith	Total Orgasm 2
"Blade: The Art of Ox"	2015	Cannibal Ox	Blade of the Ronin

=== Music videos ===
Year	Album	Title	Director	Other featured artist
1999	Golden Arms Redemption	Dat's Gangsta		
1999	Golden Arms Redemption	Bizarre		
1999	12"	No Exit (Hip Rock)		Blondie, Mobb Deep, Inspectah Deck
2000	Supreme Clientele	Cherchez La Ghost		Ghostface Killah
2002	The Sting	KIlla Beez		RZA, Inspectah Deck, Suga Bang Bang
2009	Dopium	Wu-Tang	Don Tyler	Method Man
2013	The Keynote Speaker	Heads Up	Don Tyler	GZA, Jackpot Scotty Wotty
2013	The Keynote Speaker	Fame	n/c	Styles P
2013	The Keynote Speaker	Skyscraper	n/c	
2018	Venom	Epicenter	Brann	Inspectah Deck, Raekwon, Jackpot Scotty Wotty
