= List of songs recorded by Wu-Tang Clan =

Wu-Tang Clan is an American hip hop group from Staten Island, New York City originally composed of East Coast rappers RZA, Method Man, Inspectah Deck, Ghostface Killah, GZA, Ol' Dirty Bastard, Masta Killa, Raekwon, and U-God. Longtime collaborator Cappadonna became an official member in 2007.

Below is a list of songs recorded by the group.

== List ==
Note: This list only includes songs credited to the "Wu-Tang Clan". It does not contain songs released by the individual members (not collectively credited as the Wu-Tang Clan) or songs released by their affiliates.

Key
†	Indicates single release

Name of song, performer(s), writers, producer(s), original release, and year of release
Song	Performer(s)	Writers	Producer(s)	Original release	Year	Ref.
"40th Street Black / We Will Fight"	Cappadonna; GZA; Inspectah Deck; Masta Killa; Method Man; RZA; U-God	Ronald Bean; Dennis Coles; Robert Diggs; Gary Grice; Lamont Hawkins; Darryl Hill; Jason Hunter; Elgin Turner	Mathematics; RZA	A Better Tomorrow	2014	
"As High as Wu-Tang Get"	GZA; Method Man; Ol' Dirty Bastard	Wu-Tang Clan	RZA	Wu-Tang Forever	1997	
"Babies"	Ghostface Killah; GZA; Madame D Raekwon	Dennis Coles; Robert Diggs; Gary Grice; Jason Hunter; Corey Woods	RZA	Iron Flag	2001	
"Back in the Game" † (feat. Ron Isley)	Ghostface Killah; GZA; Inspectah Deck; Method Man; Raekwon; Ronald Isley	Samuel Barnes; Dennis Coles; Jason Hunter; Jean-Claude Olivier; Clifford Smith; Corey Woods	Trackmasters	Iron Flag	2001	
"Bells of War"	Ghostface Killah; Masta Killa; Method Man; Raekwon; RZA; U-God	Wu-Tang Clan	RZA	Wu-Tang Forever	1997	
"A Better Tomorrow" (feat. Tekitha)	Cappadonna; Masta Killa; Method Man; Raekwon; RZA; Tekitha	Vitor Carstarphen; Robert Diggs; Darryl Hill; Jason Hunter; Gene McFadden; Elgin Turner; John Whitehead; Corey Woods	RZA	A Better Tomorrow	2014	
"A Better Tomorrow"	Inspectah Deck; Masta Killa; Method Man; RZA; U-God	Wu-Tang Clan	4th Disciple	Wu-Tang Forever	1997	
"Black Shampoo"	Dom Pachino; Method Man; Tekitha; U-God	Wu-Tang Clan	RZA	Wu-Tang Forever	1997	
"The Bloody Page"	–			Once Upon a Time in Shaolin	2015 (Note: Once Upon a Time in Shaolin was sold as a single copy in 2015, but cannot be commercially exploited until 2103.)	
"Bring Da Ruckus"	Ghostface Killah; GZA; Inspectah Deck; Raekwon; RZA	Wu-Tang Clan	RZA	Enter the Wu-Tang (36 Chambers)	1993	
"The Brute"	–			Once Upon a Time in Shaolin	2015	
"Campfires"	Cappadonna; Ghostface Killah; Method Man	Dennis Coles; Robert Diggs; Darryl Hill; Clifford Smith	RZA	8 Diagrams	2007	
"Can It Be All So Simple" †	Ghostface Killah; Raekwon; RZA	Wu-Tang Clan	RZA	Enter the Wu-Tang (36 Chambers)	1993	
"Careful (Click, Click)" †	Cappadonna; Ghostface Killah; Inspectah Deck; Masta Killa; Raekwon; RZA; U-God	Wu-Tang Clan	RZA	The W	2000	
"Cash Still Rules" / "Scary Hours (Still Don't Nothing Move But the Money)"	Ghostface Killah; Method Man; Raekwon	Wu-Tang Clan	4th Disciple	Wu-Tang Forever	1997	
"Centipedes"	–			Once Upon a Time in Shaolin	2015	
"Chrome Wheels"	12 O'Clock; Madame D Prodigal Sunn; Raekwon; RZA	Robert Diggs; Corey Woods	RZA	Iron Flag	2001	
"The City"	Inspectah Deck	Wu-Tang Clan	4th Disciple	Wu-Tang Forever	1997	
"Clan in da Front"	GZA; RZA	Wu-Tang Clan	RZA	Enter the Wu-Tang (36 Chambers)	1993	
"The Closing"	Raekwon	Wu-Tang Clan	RZA	Wu-Tang Forever	1997	
"Conclusion"	GZA; Inspectah Deck; Method Man; RZA	Wu-Tang Clan	RZA	Enter the Wu-Tang (36 Chambers)	1993	
"Conditioner"	GZA; Inspectah Deck; Ol' Dirty Bastard; Snoop Dogg	Wu-Tang Clan; Snoop Dogg	RZA	The W	2000	
"C.R.E.A.M." †	Buddha Monk; Inspectah Deck; Method Man; Raekwon	Wu-Tang Clan	RZA	Enter the Wu-Tang (36 Chambers)	1993	
"Crushed Egos"	Raekwon; RZA	Robert Diggs; Gary Grice; Corey Woods; Adrian Younge	RZA; Adrian Younge	A Better Tomorrow	2014	
"Da Mystery of Chessboxin'" †	Ghostface Killah; Inspectah Deck; Ol' Dirty Bastard; Method Man; Masta Killa; Raekwon; U-God	Wu-Tang Clan	RZA; Ol' Dirty Bastard	Enter the Wu-Tang (36 Chambers)	1993	
"Dashing (Reasons)"	Inspectah Deck; GZA	Robert Diggs; Gary Grice; Jason Hunter	RZA	Iron Flag	2001	
"Deadly Melody"	Dreddy Kruger; Inspectah Deck; Ghostface Killah; GZA; Masta Killa; Method Man; RZA; Streetlife; U-God	Wu-Tang Clan	RZA	Wu-Tang Forever	1997	
"Diesel"	Method Man; Ol' Dirty Bastard; Raekwon; RZA; U-God	Wu-Tang Clan	RZA	Soul in the Hole (soundtrack) (Note: Later appeared on the compilation album Legend of the Wu-Tang: Wu-Tang Clan's Greatest Hits (2004).)	1997	
"Do You Really (Thang, Thang)"	DJ Kay Slay; Inspectah Deck; Masta Killa; Method Man; Streetlife	Wu-Tang Clan	Mathematics	The W	2000	
"Dog Shit"	Ol' Dirty Bastard; RZA; Method Man	Wu-Tang Clan	RZA	Wu-Tang Forever	1997	
"Duck Seazon"	Raekwon; RZA; Method Man	Wu-Tang Clan	RZA	Wu-Tang Forever	1997	
"Entrance (Intro)"	–			Once Upon a Time in Shaolin	2015	
"Ethiopia"	–			Once Upon a Time in Shaolin	2015	
"Family Reunion" †	Ghostface Killah; Masta Killa; Method Man; RZA	Wu-Tang Clan	RZA	Non-album single	2013	
"Felt"	Cappadonna; Ghostface Killah; Masta Killa; Method Man; RZA	Dennis Coles; Robert Diggs; Darryl Hill; Clifford Smith; Elgin Turner	RZA	A Better Tomorrow	2014	
"Flowers"	–			Once Upon a Time in Shaolin	2015	
"For Heaven's Sake"	Inspectah Deck; Masta Killah; Cappadonna	Wu-Tang Clan; Darryl Hill	RZA	Wu-Tang Forever	1997	
"Freedom (Interlude)"	–			Once Upon a Time in Shaolin	2015	
"Get Them Out Ya Way Pa"	Ghostface Killah; Masta Killa; Method Man; Raekwon; RZA; U-God	Dennis Coles; Robert Diggs; Lamont Hawkins; Clifford Smith; Elgin Turner; Corey Woods	RZA	8 Diagrams	2007	
"Gravel Pit" †	Ghostface Killah; Method Man; Paulissa Moorman; Raekwon; RZA; U-God	Wu-Tang Clan	RZA	The W	2000	
"Gun Will Go"	Masta Killa; Method Man; Raekwon; Sunny Valentine	Robert Diggs; Clifford Smith; Elgin Turner; Corey Woods	RZA	8 Diagrams	2007	
"Handkerchief"	–			Once Upon a Time in Shaolin	2015	
"The Heart Gently Weeps" (Note: Features guitar by John Frusciante and Dhani Harrison) † (feat. Erykah Badu)	Erykah Badu; Ghostface Killah; Method Man; Raekwon	Dennis Coles; Robert Diggs; George Harrison; Clifford Smith; Corey Woods	RZA; George Drakoulias	8 Diagrams	2007	
"Heaterz"	Cappadonna; Inspectah Deck; Ol' Dirty Bastard; Raekwon; U-God	Wu-Tang Clan; Derek Harris; Darryl Hill	True Master	Wu-Tang Forever	1997	
"Hellz Wind Staff"	Ghostface Killah; Inspectah Deck; Method Man; RZA; Raekwon; Streetlife	Wu-Tang Clan	RZA	Wu-Tang Forever	1997	
"Hold the Heater"	Cappadonna; GZA; Method Man; RZA; U-God	Robert Allen; Robert Diggs; Peter Lind Hayes; Clifford Smith; Elgin Turner	RZA	A Better Tomorrow	2014	
"Hollow Bones"	Ghostface Killah; Inspectah Deck; Raekwon	Wu-Tang Clan	RZA	The W	2000	
"I Can't Go to Sleep"	Ghostface Killah; Isaac Hayes; RZA	Wu-Tang Clan	RZA	The W	2000	
"Impossible"	Ghostface Killah; Raekwon; RZA; Tekitha; U-God	Wu-Tang Clan	4th Disciple; RZA	Wu-Tang Forever	1997	
"In the Hood"	Inspectah Deck; Masta Killa; RZA; Streetlife; Suga Bang Bang	Patrick Charles; Robert Diggs; Jason Hunter; Elgin Turner	RZA	Iron Flag	2001	
"Intro"	GZA; RZA	Wu-Tang Clan	RZA	Wu-Tang Forever	1997	
"Intro (Shaolin Finger Jab) / Chamber Music"	GZA; Masta Killa; Method Man; Raekwon	Wu-Tang Clan	RZA	The W	2000	
"Iqra"	–			Once Upon a Time in Shaolin	2015	
"Iron Flag"	Cappadonna; Ghostface Killah; Inspectah Deck; Masta Killa; Raekwon; RZA; U-God	Robert Diggs; Lamont Hawkins; Darryl Hill; Jason Hunter; Elgin Turner; Corey Woods	RZA	Iron Flag	2001	
"It's Yourz" †	Ghostface Killah; Inspectah Deck; Raekwon; RZA; U-God	Wu-Tang Clan	RZA	Wu-Tang Forever	1997	
"Jah World"	Ghostface Killah; Junior Reid; RZA	Wu-Tang Clan	RZA	The W	2000	
"Keep Watch" † (feat. Nathaniel)	Cappadonna; GZA; Inspectah Deck; Method Man; Nathaniel	Ronald Bean; Betty Jean Crutcher; Robert Diggs; Gary Grice; Darryl Hill; Jason Hunter; Nathaniel Peterson; David Porter; Clifford Smith; Ronnie Williams	Mathematics	A Better Tomorrow	2014	
"Let My Niggas Live"	Inspectah Deck; Nas; Raekwon	Wu-Tang Clan; Nasir Jones	RZA	The W	2000	
"Life Changes"	GZA; Inspectah Deck; Masta Killa; Method Man; Raekwon; RZA; U-God	Robert Diggs; Gary Grice; Lamont Hawkins; Jason Hunter; Clifford Smith; Elgin Turner; Corey Woods	RZA	8 Diagrams	2007	
"Lions"	–			Once Upon a Time in Shaolin	2015	
"Little Ghetto Boys"	Cappadonna; Ghostface Killah; Method Man; Raekwon; RZA	Wu-Tang Clan; Darryl Hill	RZA	Wu-Tang Forever	1997	
"Maria"	Cappadonna; Ol' Dirty Bastard; RZA	Wu-Tang Clan; Darryl Hill	RZA	Wu-Tang Forever	1997	
"Method Man" †	Ghostface Killah; GZA; Method Man; Raekwon; RZA	Wu-Tang Clan	RZA	Enter the Wu-Tang (36 Chambers)	1993	
"The M.G.M."	Ghostface Killah; Raekwon	Wu-Tang Clan; Derek Harris	True Master	Wu-Tang Forever	1997	
"Miracle"	Tyler Diggs; Ghostface Killah; Inspectah Deck; Masta Killa; Tatum Miranda; Raekwon	Selwyn Bougard; Robert Diggs; Jason Hunter; Elgin Turner	4th Disciple; RZA	A Better Tomorrow	2014	
"Mistaken Identity" (feat. Streetlife)	Cappadonna; Inspectah Deck; Masta Killa; Method Man; Streetlife; U-God	Patrick Charles; Robert Diggs; Lamont Hawkins; Jason Hunter; Clifford Smith; Elgin Turner	RZA	A Better Tomorrow	2014	
"The Monument"	Busta Rhymes; GZA; Raekwon	Wu-Tang Clan; Trevor Smith	RZA	The W	2000	
"Necklace"	Cappadonna; Ghostface Killah; GZA; Raekwon	Dennis Coles; Robert Diggs; Gary Grice; Darryl Hill; Corey Woods	4th Disciple	A Better Tomorrow	2014	
"Never Let Go"	GZA; Inspectah Deck; Masta Killa; Method Man; RZA; U-God	Robert Diggs; Gary Grice; Lamont Hawkins; Jason Hunter; Martin Luther King Jr. Clifford Smith	RZA	A Better Tomorrow	2014	
"Older Gods"	Ghostface Killah; GZA; Raekwon	Wu-Tang Clan	4th Disciple	Wu-Tang Forever	1997	
"One Blood Under W"	Junior Reid; Masta Killa	Wu-Tang Clan	RZA	The W	2000	
"One of These Days"	Inspectah Deck; Raekwon; U-God	Patrick Charles; Lamont Hawkins; Jason Hunter; Nick Loftin; Corey Woods	Nick "Fury" Loftin	Iron Flag	2001	
"The Pillage of '88"	–			Once Upon a Time in Shaolin	2015	
"Pioneer the Frontier"	Inspectah Deck; Ol' Dirty Bastard; Masta Killa; RZA; U-God	Robert Diggs; Lamont Hawkins; Jason Hunter; Elgin Turner	RZA	A Better Tomorrow	2014	
"Poisoned Earth"	–			Once Upon a Time in Shaolin	2015	
"Preacher's Daughter"	Cappadonna; Ghostface Killah; Masta Killa; Method Man; RZA	Robert Diggs; Darryl Hill; John David Hurley; Clifford Smith; Elgin Turner; Ronnie Stephen Wilkins	RZA	A Better Tomorrow	2014	
"The Projects"	Ghostface Killah; Method Man; Raekwon; Shyheim; U-God	Wu-Tang Clan	RZA	Wu-Tang Forever	1997	
"Protect Ya Neck" †	Ghostface Killah; GZA; Inspectah Deck; Ol' Dirty Bastard; Method Man; Raekwon; RZA; U-God	Wu-Tang Clan	RZA	Enter the Wu-Tang (36 Chambers)	1993	
"Protect Ya Neck (The Jump Off)" †	Cappadonna; Ghostface Killah; GZA; Inspectah Deck; Masta Killa; Method Man; Raekwon; RZA; U-God	Wu-Tang Clan	RZA	The W	2000	
"Radioactive (Four Assassins)"	GZA; Masta Killa; Method Man; Raekwon	Robert Diggs; Gary Grice; Clifford Smith; Elgin Turner; Corey Woods	RZA	Iron Flag	2001	
"Redbull"	Ghostface Killah; Inspectah Deck; Method Man; Raekwon; Redman	Wu-Tang Clan; Reginald Noble	RZA	The W	2000	
"Reunited" †	GZA; Method Man; Ms. Roxy; Ol' Dirty Bastard; RZA	Wu-Tang Clan	RZA	Wu-Tang Forever	1997	
"Rivals"	–			Once Upon a Time in Shaolin	2015	
"Ron O'Neal" † (feat. Nathaniel)	Ghostface Killah; Inspectah Deck; Masta Killa; Method Man; Nathaniel; RZA	Dennis Coles; Robert Diggs; Jason Hunter; Clifford Smith; Elgin Turner	RZA	A Better Tomorrow	2014	
"Ruckus in B Minor"	Cappadonna; Ghostface Killah; GZA; Inspectah Deck; Masta Killa; Method Man; Ol' Dirty Bastard; Raekwon; RZA; U-God	Robert Diggs; Gary Grice; Lamont Hawkins; Darryl Hill; Jason Hunter; Clifford Smith; Elgin Turner; Adrian Younge	RZA; Rick Rubin	A Better Tomorrow	2014	
"Rules" †	Ghostface Killah; Inspectah Deck; Masta Killa; Method Man; Raekwon; RZA; Streetlife	Ronald Bean; Patrick Charles; Dennis Coles; Robert Diggs; Jason Hunter; Clifford Smith; Elgin Turner; Corey Woods	RZA	Iron Flag	2001	
"Rushing Elephants"	GZA; Masta Killa; Raekwon; RZA	Robert Diggs; Gary Grice; Jason Hunter; Elgin Turner; Corey Woods	RZA	8 Diagrams	2007	
"The Saga Continues"	–			Once Upon a Time in Shaolin	2015	
"Salaam (Outro)"	–			Once Upon a Time in Shaolin	2015	
"Second Coming"	Tekitha	Wu-Tang Clan	RZA	Wu-Tang Forever	1997	
"Severe Punishment"	GZA; Masta Killa; Raekwon; RZA; U-God	Wu-Tang Clan	RZA	Wu-Tang Forever	1997	
"Shame on a Nigga"	Ol' Dirty Bastard; Method Man; Raekwon	Wu-Tang Clan	RZA	Enter the Wu-Tang (36 Chambers)	1993	
"Shaolin"	–			Once Upon a Time in Shaolin	2015	
"Shaolin Soul (Exit)"	–			Once Upon a Time in Shaolin	2015	
"Shaolin Worldwide"	Ghostface Killah; Inspectah Deck; Method Man; Streetlife	Ronald Bean; Patrick Charles; Dennis Coles; Robert Diggs; Jason Hunter; Clifford Smith; Corey Woods	Allah Mathematics	Next Friday (soundtrack)	1999	
"Since Time Immemorial"	–			Once Upon a Time in Shaolin	2015	
"The Slaughter Mill"	–			Once Upon a Time in Shaolin	2015	
"Sorrow"	–			Once Upon a Time in Shaolin	2015	
"Soul Power (Black Jungle)" (feat. Flavor Flav)	Flavor Flav; Ghostface Killah; Masta Killa; Method Man; Raekwon; U-God	Dennis Coles; Robert Diggs; Lamont Hawkins; Jason Hunter; Clifford Smith; Elgin Turner; Corey Woods	RZA	Iron Flag	2001	
"Staple Town Pt. 1 (Interlude)"	–			Once Upon a Time in Shaolin	2015	
"Staple Town Pt. 2 (Interlude)"	–			Once Upon a Time in Shaolin	2015	
"Starter"	GZA; Inspectah Deck; Tase Mahogany; Streetlife; U-God; Sunny Valentine	Patrick Charles; Robert Diggs; Gary Grice; Lamont Hawkins; Jason Hunter	RZA	8 Diagrams	2007	
"Stick Me for My Riches"	Gerald Alston; GZA; Inspectah Deck; Method Man; RZA	Ronald Bean; Robert Diggs; Gary Grice; Jason Hunter; Clifford Smith	Mathematics; RZA	8 Diagrams	2007	
"Sunlight"	Raekwon; RZA	Robert Diggs	RZA	8 Diagrams	2007	
"Sustenance (Intro)"	–			Once Upon a Time in Shaolin	2015	
"The Sword Chamber"	–			Once Upon a Time in Shaolin	2015	
"Take It Back" †	Ghostface Killah; Inspectah Deck; Method Man; Raekwon; U-God	Dennis Coles; Robert Diggs; Osten Harvey Jr. Lamont Hawkins; Jason Hunter; Clifford Smith; Corey Woods	Easy Mo Bee; RZA	8 Diagrams	2007	
"Tar Pit" (bonus track)	Cappadonna; George Clinton; Method Man; Streetlife; U-God	Patrick Charles; Robert Diggs; Lamont Hawkins; Darryl Hill; Jason Hunter; Clifford Smith	RZA	8 Diagrams	2007	
"Tearz"	Ghostface Killah; RZA	Wu-Tang Clan	RZA	Enter the Wu-Tang (36 Chambers)	1993	
"Triumph" †	Cappadonna; Ghostface Killah; GZA; Inspectah Deck; Ol' Dirty Bastard; Masta Killa; Method Man; Raekwon; RZA; U-God	Wu-Tang Clan	RZA	Wu-Tang Forever	1997	
"Unique"	–			Once Upon a Time in Shaolin	2015	
"Unpredictable"	Inspectah Deck; RZA; Dexter Wiggles	Robert Diggs; Jason Hunter; Corey Woods	RZA	8 Diagrams	2007	
"Uzi (Pinky Ring)" †	Ghostface Killah; GZA; Inspectah Deck; Masta Killa; Method Man; Raekwon; RZA; U-God	Dennis Coles; Robert Diggs; Gary Grice; Lamont Hawkins; Jason Hunter; Russell Jones; Clarence Reid; Clifford Smith; Elgin Turner; Corey Woods	RZA	Iron Flag	2001	
"Visionz"	Ghostface Killah; Inspectah Deck; Masta Killa; Method Man; Raekwon	Wu-Tang Clan	Inspectah Deck	Wu-Tang Forever	1997	
"Weak Spot"	GZA; Ol' Dirty Bastard; Raekwon; RZA	Robert Diggs; Gary Grice; Corey Woods	RZA	8 Diagrams	2007	
"The Widow's Tear"	–			Once Upon a Time in Shaolin	2015	
"Windmill"	Cappadonna; GZA; Inspectah Deck; Masta Killa; Method Man; Raekwon	Robert Diggs; Gary Grice; Jason Hunter; Clifford Smith; Elgin Turner; Corey Woods	RZA	8 Diagrams	2007	
"Wolves" (feat. George Clinton)	George Clinton; Masta Killa; Method Man; U-God	George Clinton; Robert Diggs; Lamont Hawkins; Clifford Smith; Elgin Turner	RZA	8 Diagrams	2007	
"The Worst" † (Wu-Tang Clan and Onyx)	Sticky Fingaz; Method Man; Raekwon; Sonny Seeza; Killa Sin; Fredro Starr; X-1	Kirk Jones; A. Long; Fred Scruggs; Clifford Smith; Tyrone Taylor; Corey Woods	Latief	Ride (soundtrack)	1998	
"Wu-Revolution"	Papa Wu; Uncle Pete	Wu-Tang Clan	RZA	Wu-Tang Forever	1997	
"Wu-Tang Clan Ain't Nuthing ta Fuck Wit" †	Inspectah Deck; Method Man; RZA	Wu-Tang Clan	RZA; Method Man	Enter the Wu-Tang (36 Chambers)	1993	
"Wu-Tang Reunion"	Ghostface Killah; Masta Killa; Method Man; The O'Jays; RZA	Dennis Coles; Robert Diggs; Kenneth Gamble; Leon Huff; Clifford Smith; Elgin Turner	RZA	A Better Tomorrow	2014	
"Wu-Tang: 7th Chamber"	Ghostface Killah; GZA; Inspectah Deck; Ol' Dirty Bastard; Method Man; Raekwon; RZA; U-God	Wu-Tang Clan	RZA	Enter the Wu-Tang (36 Chambers)	1993	
"Wu-Tang: 7th Chamber – Part II"	Ghostface Killah; GZA; Inspectah Deck; Ol' Dirty Bastard; Method Man; Raekwon; RZA	Wu-Tang Clan	RZA	Enter the Wu-Tang (36 Chambers)	1993	
"Y'all Been Warned"	Inspectah Deck; Masta Killa; Method Man; Raekwon; RZA	Patrick Charles; Dennis Coles; Robert Diggs; Derek Harris; Jason Hunter; Clifford Smith; Elgin Turner; Corey Woods	True Master	Iron Flag	2001	

== See also ==
- RZA discography
- GZA discography
- Ol' Dirty Bastard discography
- Method Man discography
- Raekwon discography
- Ghostface Killah discography
- Inspectah Deck discography
- U-God discography
- Masta Killa discography
- Cappadonna discography
