= UGodz-Illa Presents: The Hillside Scramblers =

Studio album by the Hillside Scramblers
- Released: March 16, 2004
- Recorded: 2004
- Genre: Hip-hop
- Length: 1:13:25
- Labels: Lucky Hands Inc.; INDIEgo; Synergy Distribution
- Producers: DJ Homicide; Leathafase; Mark Alston; Que Tracks; Six Mill

U-God chronology
Golden Arms Redemption (1999)	UGodz-Illa Presents: The Hillside Scramblers (2004)	Mr. Xcitement (2005)

Professional ratings
Review scores
Source	Rating
AllMusic	3.5/5 stars
RapReviews	6/10
Tiny Mix Tapes	2/5 marks

UGodz-Illa Presents: The Hillside Scramblers is the only studio album by American eleven-piece hip-hop group the Hillside Scramblers, led by Wu-Tang Clan member U-God. It was released on March 16, 2004 through INDIEgo/Synergy Distribution. Produced by members Leatha Face and DJ Homicide, Mark Alston, Que Tracks and Six Mill, it features contributions from U-God, Inf-Black, Leatha Face, Autumn Rue, Desert Eagle, Black Ice, Kawz, King Just, Frank Banger and Ja-Mal.

Despite the imminent disintegration of the group, member Leatha Face took part in U-God's subsequent albums Mr. Xcitement and Dopium, and DJ Homicide produced tracks on the albums Mr. Xcitement, The Keynote Speaker and Venom.

== Background ==
Originally a member of the cult hip-hop group Wu-Tang Clan, U-God, renounced further work in the group due to disagreements with its leader RZA, which led to the creation of the Hillside Scramblers project. He recruited Wu-Tang affiliated Shaolin Soldiers members Leathafase (who participated in U-God's 1999 solo debut Golden Arms Redemption) and King Just, producer DJ Homicide and seven other aspiring rappers. U-God claimed that the project is not an attempt at resurrecting a crew like the Wu-Tang.

== Reception ==
UGodz-Illa Presents: The Hillside Scramblers was met with mixed or average reviews from music critics, who panned the album because they believed that it did not completely satisfy the listeners. AllMusic gave the album three-and-a-half stars out of five. Steve 'Flash' Juon of RapReviews complained that the words were mostly clichéd and the beats were similar to U-God's Golden Arms Redemption tracks. Wolfman of Tiny Mix Tapes labeled it as "for collectors only", resuming: "if you're indifferent to U-God's work, this album won't do anything but reaffirm your indifference".

== Track listing ==
No.	Title	Producer(s)	Length
1.	"Intro"	Que Tracks	0:42
2.	"Pain Inside" (performed by U-God, Black Ice and Leathaface)	Six Mill	4:10
3.	"Lean Like Me" (performed by U-God)	Leathaface	4:02
4.	"Destiny" (performed by Leathaface and Inf-Black)	Leathaface	4:26
5.	"Stick Up" (performed by Inf-Black)	Leathaface	4:21
6.	"Tell Me" (performed by Desert Eagle, Leathaface and Inf-Black)	Leathaface	3:51
7.	"Chippin & Chop It" (performed by U-God, Inf-Black and Kawz)	Leathaface	4:05
8.	"Booty Drop" (performed by Leathaface)	DJ Homicide	3:42
9.	"Spit Game" (performed by U-God, Inf-Black, Leathaface and Autumn Rue)	Leathaface	4:01
10.	"Ghetto Gutter" (performed by U-God and Autumn Rue)	Leathaface	3:35
11.	"Drama" (performed by Leathaface, Inf-Black, Kawz and U-God)	Leathaface	4:16
12.	"Take It to the Top" (performed by Desert Eagle, U-God, Inf-Black and King Just)	Leathaface	5:34
13.	"KJ Rhyme" (performed by King Just)	Leathaface	4:28
14.	"Gang of Gangstas" (performed by Black Ice, Desert Eagle, U-God, Inf-Black, Frank Banger and Ja-Mal)	Leathaface	6:46
15.	"Put It on Me" (performed by U-God and Autumn Rue)	Mark Alston	3:46
16.	"Struggle Ain't Got No Color" (performed by U-God)	DJ Homicide	4:05
17.	"Here We Come" (performed by U-God, Inf-Black and Leathaface)	Leathaface	3:27
18.	"Prayer" (performed by U-God and Autumn Rue)	Leathaface	4:08
Total length:			1:13:25

== Personnel ==
- Lamont "U-God" Hawkins – performer (tracks: 2, 3, 7, 9–12, 14–18), executive producer, sleeve notes
- Lamar "Black Ice" Manson – performer (tracks: 2, 14)
- Orlando "Leatha Face" Irizarry – performer (tracks: 2, 4, 6, 8, 9, 11, 17), producer (tracks: 3–7, 9–14, 17, 18)
- Inf-Black – performer (tracks: 4–7, 9, 11, 12, 14, 17)
- Desert Eagle – performer (tracks: 6, 12, 14)
- Michael "Kawz" Kawse – performer (tracks: 7, 11)
- Autumn Rue – performer (tracks: 9, 10, 15, 18)
- Adrian "King Just" Angevin – performer (tracks: 12, 13)
- Frank Banger – performer (track 14)
- Ja-Mal – performer (track 14)
- Anthony "DJ Homicide" Mercado – producer (tracks: 8, 16)
- Que Tracks – producer (track 1)
- Six Mill – producer (track 2)
- Mark Alston – producer (track 15)
- Nick Jackson – design, layout
