= 8 Diagrams =

Studio album by Wu-Tang Clan
- Released: December 11, 2007
- Recorded: 2007
- Genre: Hip-hop
- Length: 63:22
- Label: Wu; SRC; Loud; Universal Motown
- Producer: RZA; Easy Mo Bee; George Drakoulias; Mathematics

Wu-Tang Clan chronology
Iron Flag (2001)	8 Diagrams (2007)	A Better Tomorrow (2014)

Singles from 8 Diagrams
- 1. "The Heart Gently Weeps" Released: October 3, 2007; 2. "Take It Back" Released: 2007

8 Diagrams is the fifth studio album by American hip-hop group Wu-Tang Clan, released December 11, 2007, on Wu Music Group, SRC Records, the newly-relaunched Loud Records, and Universal Motown Records. The album was released three years after the death of Ol' Dirty Bastard, and six years after the group's previous LP Iron Flag.

Upon its release, 8 Diagrams debuted at number 25 on the Billboard 200, and number 9 on the Top R&B/Hip-Hop Albums chart with 68,000 copies sold in the first week. It has sold 202,000 copies in the United States as of April 2014. The album received generally favorable reviews from most music critics, and earned greater praise than the group's previous album Iron Flag.

== Background ==
8 Diagrams marked the group's first full collaboration since the death of original member Ol' Dirty Bastard, who had died in 2004. The album's title is derived from the martial arts film The Eight Diagram Pole Fighter. The group, which had not released an album since 2001's Iron Flag, signed a one-album deal with Steve Rifkind's SRC Records in December 2006. Wu-Tang's four previous albums were all released on Rifkind's now-defunct Loud Records.

On Sunday, August 5, 2007, at the Virgin Festival in Baltimore, RZA announced that the release date for the album would be November 13, 2007, noting that this is the third anniversary of the death of Ol' Dirty Bastard. However, the date was delayed to December 11, 2007.

In a released statement, group leader RZA commented on the need for the group's return, stating "This is the perfect time for us to come back; the stars are aligned. It's like when we first started with Steve. We put out real hip-hop at a time when it was turning into pop or R&B. We brought the focus back to the music in its rawest form, without studio polish or radio hooks.... People want something that gives them an adrenaline rush. We're here to supply that fix. How could hip-hop be dead if Wu-Tang is forever? We're here to revive the spirit and the economics and bring in a wave of energy that has lately dissipated".

At the public premiere of Wu: The Story of the Wu-Tang in New York City, Cappadonna revealed that Wu-Tang had recorded between 40 and 50 songs for the record, of which around fourteen would make up 8 Diagrams. Prior to the album's release, Loud.com issued a free 8 Diagrams mixtape containing exclusive and unreleased tracks, including "Thug World", "Life Changes", "Stick Me for My Riches", and "Weak Spot".

In 2019, RZA revealed that 8 Diagrams was originally going to be the group's final album.

== Music ==
=== Collaborations ===
8 Diagrams featured the eight living original Wu-Tang Clan members, with previously recorded material from Ol' Dirty Bastard, as well as a tribute track titled "Life Changes." The album marked the official inclusion of long time Wu-Tang Clan affiliate Cappadonna as an official member. Auxiliary member Street Life also appears on the album.

In an article from NME, it was stated that the album would feature production from Easy Mo Bee, Marley Marl, Q-Tip, DJ Scratch and Nile Rodgers, though Easy Mo Bee would end up being the only producer on the list to make it on the album. George Clinton of P-Funk, Dhani Harrison, John Frusciante of the Red Hot Chili Peppers, and Shavo Odadjian, bassist of System of a Down also make appearances on 8 Diagrams.

=== Artistic disagreements ===
Unlike Wu-Tang's previous albums, which used the "darker, sinister, and street-oriented, signature Wu sound", RZA utilized a more experimental, orchestral, and more universal choice of music production for the album.

Ghostface Killah and Raekwon stated in interviews that they were not comfortable with the album's release as it did not contain the signature "Wu-Tang sound". Raekwon planned a follow-up group album entitled "Shaolin vs. Wu-Tang" without input from RZA. It was later announced in Vibe magazine, however, that Shaolin vs. Wu-Tang would be Raekwon's fifth solo album, and that it would feature guest appearances from several other group members, with no contributions from RZA. In regards to the album's direction, Raekwon stated "RZA doesn't have to be on every album. I wanted to give some other producers a chance. It's not about beef. We can stand on our own."

=== Singles ===
In a BBC Radio 1Xtra interview, Method Man stated that "Watch Your Mouth" would be the album's first single. However, it was rumored that the song's producer DJ Scratch was unable to get a sample clearance, which resulted in its omission on the final release of the album.

Instead, the first official single was "The Heart Gently Weeps", an adaptation of the Beatles song "While My Guitar Gently Weeps". George Harrison's son Dhani Harrison and John Frusciante of Red Hot Chili Peppers performed acoustic and lead and guitars respectively. Originally thought to be a sampled track, it was later revealed as an interpolated version, sampling Jimmy Ponder's cover of the song. The song features Raekwon, Ghostface, and Method Man rapping and guest singing provided by Erykah Badu. RZA also confirmed that Stone Mecca, one of the newer Wu-Tang-affiliated groups, contributed backing music to the track.

== Critical reception ==
Professional ratings
Aggregate scores
Source	Rating
Metacritic	73/100
Review scores
Source	Rating
AllMusic	4/5 stars
Blender	4/5 stars
Entertainment Weekly	C−
Mojo	4/5 stars
Pitchfork	8.0/10
PopMatters	8/10
Robert Christgau	A−
Rolling Stone	3.5/5 stars
Spin	6/10
USA Today	3.5/4 stars

Upon its release, 8 Diagrams received generally positive reviews from most music critics. At Metacritic, which assigns a normalized rating out of 100 to reviews from mainstream critics, the album received an average score of 73, based on 33 reviews, which indicates "generally favorable reviews". USA Today's Steve Jones commended the group members' performances despite the absence of Ol’ Dirty Bastard, stating "the lyrical swords wielded by the nine surviving members are as razor-sharp as ever". Rolling Stone writer Christian Hoard called it "a terrific mix of classic Clan grime and enough new tricks to justify Inspectah Deck's claim that 'Wu-Tang keep it fresh like Tupperware.'". Marisa Brown of Allmusic praised RZA's production, writing that "It's beautifully, impeccably produced, from the soundtrack strings and horns, to the philosophical samples and guitars that are interspersed throughout ... it deepens and grows with every listen." Brown wrote that the album "does focus on melody and guitars and strings, but it is also lush and well-crafted and smart and addictive. Part of what's made RZA and the rest of the Clan thrive is their unpredictability and inventiveness, and so to create something expected would be counterintuitive to the group's ethos, and to what's made them so revered and respected across nations and genres and generations."

However, Entertainment Weekly's Neil Drumming commented that the album is "... a drab dilution of the Wu's signature sample-heavy, raucous sound." Thomas Golianopolous of Spin viewed that "The beats are mostly to blame [...] skeletal, low-key tracks that rarely match the rappers' palpable energy". Giving the album 2 out of 4 stars, Los Angeles Times called its arrangements "largely tepid" and wrote that several songs lack the rappers' "distinctive personalities". Slant Magazine's Dave Hughes wrote that the album "fails to cohere into anything greater than the sum of its parts" and expressed a mixed response towards RZA's production, stating "when RZA isn't attempting to tone-deafly integrate other people's old sounds into his old sounds, he just sticks with his old sounds". Kelefa Sanneh of The New York Times criticized the album's production as well, but complimented the performances of Ghostface Killah and Raekwon, stating that they "provide many of the album’s highlights."

Dave Heaton of PopMatters wrote "Critics often use the word 'cinematic' to describe the Wu-Tang sound. That word has never been more appropriate than with 8 Diagrams. RZA taps into his Ghost Dog and Kill Bill experiences to create imaginary film music, moody would-be scores to Westerns, martial arts, sci-fi and gangster films." Blender's Jonah Weiner commended RZA's production as well, stating "RZA has always been hip-hop’s reigning minimalist, but his work scoring Kill Bill, most recently, seems to have strengthened his ear for ambiance and texture." Weiner also complimented Method Man's delivery and rhymes on the album, stating that he sounds "rejuvenated." Pitchfork Media's Nate Patrin complimented the group members' lyricism. Sam Richards of Uncut gave 8 Diagrams 4 out of 5 stars, and stated "RZA’s lurching beats and raw, spectral productions, peppered with kung-fu film samples, are back to their thrillingly weird best. RZA’s dictatorial rule has ostracised Ghost and Raekwon, but you can’t argue with the results. On record at least, Wu-Tang have made the comeback of the decade."

== Track listing ==
No.	Title	Writer(s)	Producer	Length
1.	"Campfire"	Robert Diggs; Clifford Smith; Dennis Coles; Darryl Hill	RZA	3:59
2.	"Take It Back"	Osten Harvey Jr.; Diggs; Corey Woods; Jason Hunter; Coles; Lamont Hawkins; Smith	Easy Mo Bee; RZA^{[a]}	4:12
3.	"Get Them Out Ya Way Pa"	Diggs; Smith; Hawkins; Elgin Turner; Coles; Woods	RZA	4:18
4.	"Rushing Elephants"	Diggs; Woods; Gary Grice; Turner; Hunter	RZA	3:00
5.	"Unpredictable" (featuring Dexter Wiggle)	Diggs; Hunter; Woods	RZA	4:11
6.	"The Heart Gently Weeps" (featuring Erykah Badu, Dhani Harrison, and John Frusciante)	George Harrison; Diggs; Woods; Coles; Smith	RZA; George Drakoulias^{[a]}	5:37
7.	"Wolves" (featuring George Clinton)	Diggs; Smith; Turner; George Clinton; Hawkins	RZA	4:14
8.	"Gun Will Go" (Featuring Sunny Valentine)	Diggs; Woods; Smith; Turner	RZA	4:16
9.	"Sunlight"	Diggs	RZA	3:22
10.	"Stick Me for My Riches" (featuring Gerald Alston)	Ronald Bean; Diggs; Smith; Hunter; Grice	Mathematics; RZA^{[a]}	6:08
11.	"Starter" (Featuring Sunny Valentine & Tash Mahogany)	Diggs; Patrick Charles; Grice; Hunter; Hawkins	RZA	4:13
12.	"Windmill"	Diggs; Woods; Grice; Turner; Hunter; Smith	RZA	4:32
13.	"Weak Spot"	Russell Tyrone Jones; Diggs; Woods; Grice	RZA	3:58
14.	"Life Changes"	Diggs; Smith; Woods; Grice; Hunter; Turner; Hawkins	RZA	7:21
Total length:				63:22

Bonus track
No.	Title	Writer(s)	Producer(s)	Length
15.	"Tar Pit" (featuring George Clinton)	Diggs; Hawkins; Hill; Smith; Charles	RZA	4:56

International bonus track
No.	Title	Writer(s)	Producer(s)	Length
16.	"16th Chamber"	Jones; Smith	RZA	3:40

Notes

- ^{^[a]} signifies a co-producer.
- "Unpredictable" contains additional vocals by Dexter Wiggle and bass guitars by Shavo Odadjian.
- "The Heart Gently Weeps" contains lead guitars by John Frusciante and rhythm guitar and percussion by Dhani Harrison.
- "Gun Will Go" contains additional vocals by Sunny Valentine.
- "Stick Me for My Riches" contains additional vocals by Gerald Alston.
- "Starter" contains additional vocals by Sunny Valentine and Tash Mahogany.
- "Windmill" contains guitars by John Frusciante.

Sample credits

- "Campfire" contains a sample from "Gypsy Woman" as performed by The Persuasions, and dialogue from Shaolin & Wu-Tang and Writing Kung Fu.
- "Take it Back" contains a sample from "Nautilus" as performed by Bob James.
- "Rushing Elephants" contains a sample from "Marcia in LA (Alzati spia)" as performed by Ennio Morricone.
- "Unpredictable" contains a sample from "Wailing Wail" as performed by Nicolas Flagello.
- "The Heart Gently Weeps" contains an interpolation of "While My Guitar Gently Weeps" as performed by The Beatles.
- "Stick Me for My Riches" contains a sample from "Hang on Sloopy" as performed by David Porter.
- "Windmill" contains samples from "Bang Bang (My Baby Shot Me Down)" as performed by Nancy Sinatra, "Ain't No Sunshine" as performed by Lyn Collins and "Brave and Strong" as performed by Sly and the Family Stone.
- "Weak Spot" contains a sample from "Sneakin' in the Back" as performed by Tom Scott.
- "Life Changes" contains samples from "The Road We Didn't Take" as performed by Freda Payne, and "Easiest Way to Fall" as performed by Freda Payne.

== Personnel ==
- RZA – performer, strings, arranger, programming, producer, engineer, mixing
- GZA – performer
- Method Man – performer
- Raekwon – performer
- Ghostface Killah – performer
- Inspectah Deck – performer
- U-God – performer
- Masta Killa – performer
- Cappadonna – performer
- Erykah Badu – vocals
- George Clinton – vocals
- Dexter Wiggle – vocals
- Sunny Valentine – vocals
- Gerald Alston – vocals
- Tash Mahogany – vocals
- John Frusciante – guitar
- Dhani Harrison – guitar
- Shavo Odadjian – bass
- Gary Foote – bass
- Trevor James – bass
- Marco Vitali – strings
- Lamont Dozier – composer
- George Drakoulias – producer, engineer
- Mathematics – producer
- Easy Mo Bee – producer, programing
- Mitchell Diggs – executive producer
- Oliver Grant – executive producer
- Jose Reynoso – engineer, mixing
- Bob Lanzner – mastering
- Steve Chahley – mixing, assistant
- Sandy Brummels – creative director
- Alexx Henry – photography
- Jason Kpana – A&R
- Tamika Layton – A&R
- Jamaal Meeks – A&R
- Vickie Charles – publicity
- Daniel Pappas – marketing
- Tatia Fox – marketing
- Eva Ries – marketing

== Charts ==
=== Weekly charts ===
Chart (2007–2008)	Peak position
Australian Albums (ARIA)	74
Belgian Albums (Ultratop Flanders)	88
Dutch Albums (Album Top 100)	95
French Albums (SNEP)	84
German Albums (Offizielle Top 100)	79
Swiss Albums (Schweizer Hitparade)	19
US Billboard 200	25
US Top R&B/Hip-Hop Albums (Billboard)	9

=== Year-end charts ===
Chart (2008)	Position
US Top R&B/Hip-Hop Albums (Billboard)	74
