= A Better Tomorrow (album) =

Studio album by Wu-Tang Clan
- Released: December 2, 2014
- Recorded: 2012–2014
- Genre: Hip-hop
- Length: 66:39
- Labels: Asylum; Warner Bros.
- Producers: RZA; Mathematics; 4th Disciple; Adrian Younge; Rick Rubin

Wu-Tang Clan chronology
The Essential Wu-Tang Clan (2013)	A Better Tomorrow (2014)	Once Upon a Time in Shaolin (2015)

Singles from A Better Tomorrow
- 1. "Keep Watch" Released: March 18, 2014; 2. "Ron O'Neal" Released: August 7, 2014; 3. "Ruckus in B Minor" Released: November 4, 2014

A Better Tomorrow is the sixth studio album by American hip-hop group Wu-Tang Clan. The album was released on December 2, 2014 by Asylum Records and Warner Bros. Records. The album was supported by the singles "Keep Watch", "Ron O'Neal" and "Ruckus in B Minor". A Better Tomorrow received generally mixed reviews from music critics. The album debuted at number 29 on the Billboard 200 chart, selling 24,386 copies in its first week of release.

== Background ==
On June 29, 2011, Raekwon announced that the group were working on a new studio album, still in its early stages, saying: "As far as Wu-Tang goes, it's something that we really got to get together first for." In July 2011, Ghostface Killah said that the album should be released in May 2012. In April 2012, GZA hinted that a new album was unlikely, saying: "I'm grateful for everything we have done throughout our careers and if there's nothing else to put out, then there's nothing to put out." In October 2012, RZA said a new Wu-Tang Clan album might happen after all, on the occasion of the group's 20th anniversary.

In November 2012, Raekwon doubted a new album would happen, saying: "I want to see it happen, but more importantly, I want to see it done the right way." On January 9, 2013, work on the sixth Wu-Tang Clan album was announced via the group's official Facebook page. In March 2013, Method Man announced that the Clan was working on a sixth studio album and it would be released during 2013 in celebration of their 20-year anniversary since 36 Chambers.

== Development ==
In March 2013, Cappadonna said the album was in the recording process, taking place in New York, Los Angeles and the Wu mansion in New Jersey. In April 2013, RZA said he had talked to Adrian Younge about working on a song for the album. On April 11, 2013, it was announced via a press release that their upcoming sixth studio album would be titled, A Better Tomorrow and was set to be released in July, 2013. In April 2013, the Clan reunited to perform at the 2013 Coachella Valley Music and Arts Festival. On May 17, 2013, an unreleased Wu-Tang song titled "Execution in Autumn" was released for purchase through RZA's record label Soul Temple Records. In June 2013, they performed at the 2013 HOT 97 Summer Jam at MetLife Stadium in New Jersey, twenty years after they performed at the first annual Summer Jam concert.

In June 2013, RZA spoke about the song "Family Reunion", saying "It's looking real promising" and that multiple members have contributed to the lyrics. He also stated he was hoping to release the album in November 2013, in honor of the 29th anniversary of [Enter The Wu-Tang (36 Chambers)].

In July 2013, Inspectah Deck stated that unreleased verses from Ol' Dirty Bastard would be featured on the album. In July 2013 Cappadonna indicated the album was half way finished. In November 2013, RZA gave an update on the album, saying that significant progress was made on recording while in Europe, but was waiting on Raekwon, Ghostface, and GZA to contribute to the album. In November 2013, Method Man stated that Raekwon had not worked on the album at all, and Ghostface had only recorded two songs for the album so far. In late November 2013, RZA suggested that the album was approximately six weeks from completion. In January 2014, the group posted a message on their Facebook page, saying: "The new Wu album A Better Tomorrow coming soon."

In March 2014, Raekwon said he didn't want RZA in charge of the album, saying: "His plan was to do a more humble album. We was like, Nah. You can't do that with the hardest group in the game."

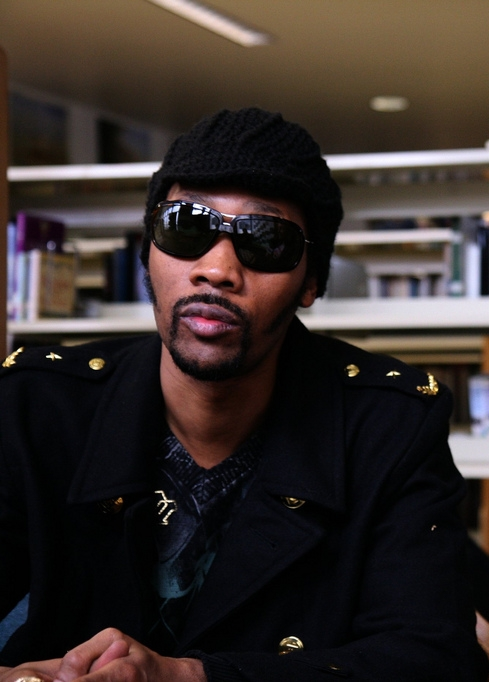
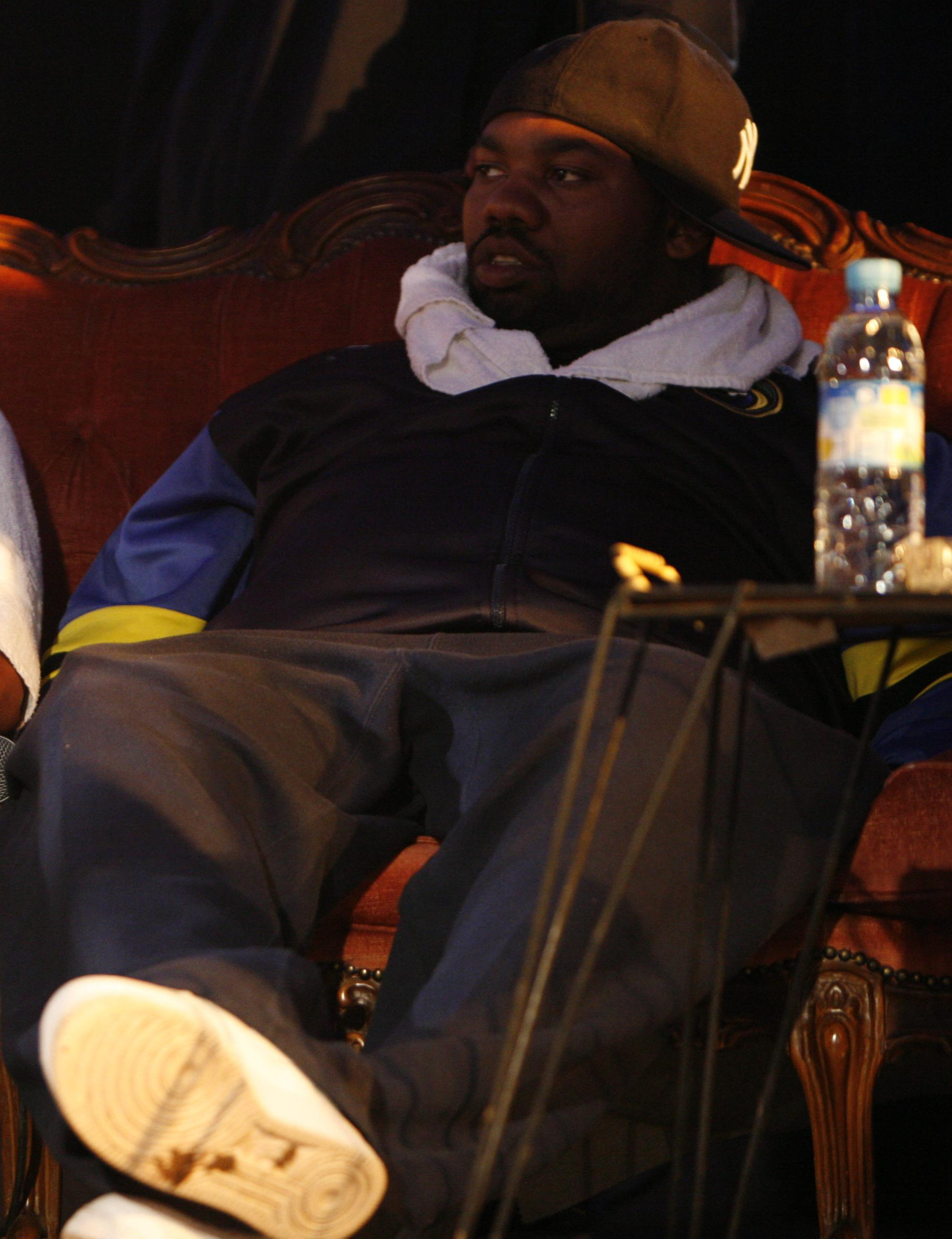
In 2014, RZA and Raekwon had a public dispute over the direction of the album.

In April 2014, RZA spoke about Raekwon's hesitation to record on the album, saying: "But I would say that maybe creatively we on different paths. I'm creatively different than I was in the '90s." In an April 2014, interview with Rolling Stone Raekwon responded saying: "I'm used to being a winner. Being that I feel the team is being compromised by his so-called 'logic' of making music, I have a problem with that because I love my fans." He elaborated on the album, saying: "I'm not happy with the direction of the music and I'm not happy with how dudes is treating dudes' business." RZA responded, saying: "When you form Voltron, you need every piece. We need him there. I want him there. I asked him over and over to be there."

In May 2014, after several disputes between Raekwon and RZA about the direction of the group and album, they reconciled, with the former agreeing to record verses for A Better Tomorrow. On October 3, 2014, it was announced that the album would be released on December 2, 2014, courtesy of a new deal with Warner Bros. Records. In October 2014, Raekwon spoke about recording the album without Ol' Dirty Bastard, saying: "Its real deep bro, because we miss that energy."

== Singles ==
On June 5, 2013, the album's first promotional single "Family Reunion" featuring Masta Killa, Method Man, Ghostface Killah and RZA was released via the Soul Temple Records website. On March 19, 2014, the album's first single "Keep Watch" featuring Nathaniel The Great, GZA, Method Man, Cappadonna, and Inspectah Deck was released. On August 6, 2014, the whole group appeared on The Daily Show to premiere the album's second single "Ron O'Neal". On November 4, 2014, the album's third single "Ruckus In B Minor" was released.

== Critical reception ==
Professional ratings
Aggregate scores
Source	Rating
Metacritic	60/100
Review scores
Source	Rating
AllMusic	4/5 stars
The A.V. Club	D
Cuepoint (Expert Witness)	A−
The Guardian	3/5 stars
The Independent	4/5 stars
NME	7/10
Pitchfork	5.9/10
Rolling Stone	2.5/5 stars
Slant Magazine	3/5 stars
Spin	6/10

A Better Tomorrow received generally mixed reviews from music critics. At Metacritic, which assigns a normalized rating out of 100 to reviews from critics, the album received an average score of 60, based on 24 reviews.

== Commercial performance ==
The album debuted at number 29 on the Billboard 200 chart, with first week sales of 24,386 copies in the United States.

== Track listing ==
Credits adapted from the album's liner notes.

A Better Tomorrow track listing
No.	Title	Writer(s)	Producer(s)	Length
1.	"Ruckus in B Minor"	Darryl Hill; Jamel Irief; Jason Richard Hunter; Lamont Jody Hawkins; Robert Fitzgerald Diggs; Clifford Smith, Jr.; Gary Eldridge Grice; Adrian Younge	RZA; Rick Rubin	5:25
2.	"Felt"	Hill; Dennis David Coles; Diggs; Irief; Smith, Jr.	RZA	3:51
3.	"40th Street Black/We Will Fight"	Hunter; Smith, Jr.; Grice; Diggs; Hawkins; Irief; Hill; Ronald Maurice Bean	Mathematics; RZA^{[a]}	4:26
4.	"Mistaken Identity" (featuring Street Life)	Irief; Hunter; Diggs; Patrick Charles; Hawkins; Smith, Jr.	RZA	5:44
5.	"Hold the Heater"	Smith, Jr.; Irief; Diggs; Robert Allen Deitcher; Peter Lind Hayes	RZA	4:08
6.	"Crushed Egos"	Corey Woods; Grice; Diggs; Younge	RZA; Adrian Younge^{[a]}	2:26
7.	"Keep Watch" (featuring Nathaniel)	Smith, Jr.; Hunter; Grice; Hill; Bean; Nathaniel Peterson; David Porter; Bettye Jean Crutcher; Ronnie Williams	Mathematics	4:25
8.	"Miracle"	Irief; Hunter; Diggs; El-Divine Amir Bey	4th Disciple; RZA^{[a]}	5:03
9.	"Preacher's Daughter"	Smith, Jr.; Hill; Irief; Diggs; John David Hurley; Ronald Stephen Wilkins	RZA	5:13
10.	"Pioneer the Frontier"	Irief; Hunter; Hawkins; Diggs	RZA	3:59
11.	"Necklace"	Hill; Coles; Woods; Grice; Diggs	4th Disciple	4:11
12.	"Ron O'Neal" (featuring Nathaniel)	Smith, Jr.; Coles; Irief; Hunter; Diggs	RZA	4:28
13.	"A Better Tomorrow" (featuring Tekitha)	Smith, Jr.; Hill; Irief; Woods; Diggs; Victor Carstarphen; Gene McFadden; John Cavadus Whitehead	RZA	4:24
14.	"Never Let Go"	Smith, Jr.; Irief; Grice; Hunter; Hawkins; Diggs; Martin Luther King Jr.	RZA	5:22
15.	"Wu-Tang Reunion"	Smith, Jr.; Coles; Irief; Diggs; Kenneth Gamble; Leon Huff	RZA	3:34
Total length:				66:39

Notes

- ^{^[a]} signifies a co-producer

Sample credits

- "Hold the Heater" contains a sample of "Come to Me", written by Robert Allen and Peter Lind Hayes, as performed by Johnny Mathis.
- "Keep Watch" contains an interpolation of "You Roam When You Don't Get It At Home", written by David Porter, Bettye Jean Crutcher, and Ronnie Williams.
- "Preacher's Daughter" contains an interpolation of "Son of a Preacher Man", written by John David Hurley and Ronnie Stephen Wilkins.
- "A Better Tomorrow" contains a sample of "Wake Up Everybody", written by Victor Carstarphen, Gene McFadden, and John Whitehead, as performed by Harold Melvin & the Blue Notes.
- "Never Let Go" contains an excerpt of the speech "I Have a Dream", written and performed by Martin Luther King Jr.
- "Wu-Tang Reunion" contains a sample of "Family Reunion", written by Kenneth Gamble and Leon Huff, as performed by The O'Jays.

== Charts ==
=== Weekly charts ===
Chart (2014)	Peak position
Australian Albums (ARIA)	49
Belgian Albums (Ultratop Flanders)	173
Belgian Albums (Ultratop Wallonia)	199
Canadian Albums (Billboard)	24
French Albums (SNEP)	104
German Albums (Offizielle Top 100)	64
Scottish Albums (Official Charts)	81
Swiss Albums (Schweizer Hitparade)	66
UK Albums (Official Charts)	74
UK Album Downloads (Official Charts)	40
UK R&B Albums (Official Charts)	4
US Billboard 200	29
US Top R&B/Hip-Hop Albums (Billboard)	3

=== Year-end charts ===
Chart (2015)	Position
US Top R&B/Hip-Hop Albums (Billboard)	78

== Release history ==
Region	Date	Format	Label	Edition(s)
Germany	November 28, 2014	CD, digital download	Warner Bros.	Standard, deluxe
France	December 1, 2014	CD, digital download	Warner Bros.	Standard, deluxe
United Kingdom	December 1, 2014	CD, digital download	Warner Bros.	Standard, deluxe
United States	December 2, 2014	CD, digital download	Warner Bros.	Standard, deluxe
