= Earth, Wind & Fire (disambiguation) =

Earth, Wind & Fire is an American band formed in Chicago in 1969.

Earth, Wind & Fire may also refer to:

- Earth, Wind & Fire (album), 1971 studio album by Earth, Wind & Fire
- Earth, Wind & Fire (To Be Celestial vs That's the Weight of the World), 2026 documentary about Earth, Wind & Fire
- Eyrth, Wynd and Fyre, 2013 studio album by American rapper Cappadonna
- "Earth, Wind & Fire" (song), 2024 song by South Korean boy band BoyNextDoor
- The classical elements of earth, wind, and fire
