= Twelve Reasons to Die =

Studio album by Ghostface Killah and Adrian Younge
- Released: April 16, 2013
- Recorded: 2012
- Genre: Hip-hop
- Length: 39:04
- Labels: Soul Temple; RED
- Producers: RZA (exec.); Adrian Younge (standard version); Apollo Brown (The Brown Tape)

Ghostface Killah and Adrian Younge chronology
Wu Block (2012)	Twelve Reasons to Die (2013)	36 Seasons (2014)

Alternate covers
- The Brown Tape

Singles from Twelve Reasons to Die
- 1. "Murder Spree" Released: April 4, 2013

Twelve Reasons to Die is the first collaborative studio album by American rapper Ghostface Killah and American composer Adrian Younge. It is a concept album based on a comic book of the same name. The album was executive-produced and narrated by RZA. It was released on April 16, 2013, by RZA's Soul Temple Records label and RED Distribution. It features guest appearances from Wu-Tang members Inspectah Deck, U-God, Masta Killa, and Cappadonna along with William Hart and Killa Sin.

A sequel, Twelve Reasons to Die II, was released on July 10, 2015.

== Background ==
On September 13, 2012, Ghostface Killah announced that his new studio album would be titled Twelve Reasons to Die, and would be produced entirely by Adrian Younge, and executive produced by RZA. He also announced a release date of November 20, 2012 through RZA's Soul Temple Records. The album would be pushed back from its original November 20, 2012, release date so it would not compete with the soundtrack to RZA's film The Man with the Iron Fists.

During an interview, Adrian Younge revealed that Twelve Reasons To Die will serve as the score to a vintage Italian horror film, that takes place in 1968. He also cited RZA and Italian composer Ennio Morricone as two of the inspirations behind his production on the album. Younge took two weeks to write the foundation of all the tracks.

The album's story is set in 1960s Italy of a character of Ghostface Killah, Tony Starks. He is an enforcer for the DeLuca crime family, who is murdered by his former employers after striking out on his own and falling in love with the kingpin's daughter. His remains are melted in vinyl and pressed into a dozen LPs that, when played, resurrect him as the Ghostface Killah, a force of revenge incarnate.

== Release and promotion ==
The LP was released in various formats including a standard CD, a deluxe double CD with instrumentals, and a mini-comic book. The label released a digital deluxe version with instrumentals and a digital comic book, as well as multiple vinyl formats and a cassette. The album was also released with a comic book. For it, the imprint teamed up with Black Mask Studios to produce a six-issue series and a collected graphic novel with "striking visuals and an intriguing dual-narrative structure with contributions from a host of stellar comic book artists."

On March 5, 2013, Ghostface Killah and Adrian Younge announced that they would go on a 49-city tour from March 28 through May 22, 2013, with Younge's band, Venice Dawn along with Wu-Tang Clan affiliate Killah Priest. This also included a show on March 14 at Soul Temple's SXSW showcase, which featured Inspectah Deck, U-God, Large Professor and Elzhi.

=== Promoted songs ===
Prior to the album's release the songs "The Rise of the Ghostface Killah" and "The Sure Shot (Parts 1 and 2)" were released for free as promotion. The first single released from the album would be "Murder Spree" which features Inspectah Deck, U-God, Masta Killa and Killa Sin. It was made available for purchase on April 4, 2013 via Soul Temple's official website. The music video would also be released the same day. That same week the song "Blood on the Cobblestones" which also features Wu-Tang Clan members Inspectah Deck and U-God, was released as a promotional single via iTunes. On April 8, 2013, Ghostface Killah performed the song "I Declare War" on Late Night with Jimmy Fallon along with Masta Killa and Killah Priest. On the release day of the album they released a music video for "Rise of the Ghostface Killah."

=== The Brown Tape ===
An official alternative version of Twelve Reasons to Die was released on April 22, 2013 on Bandcamp. It is nearly identical in track list (with the exclusion of the track "12 Reasons to Die"), but is produced by hip-hop producer Apollo Brown. On June 7, 2013 the album was made available in all other formats the original album was released on. In December 2017, Mello Music Group announced a re-release of the album for January 26, 2018.

== Commercial performance ==
Twelve Reasons to Die debuted at #27 on the Billboard 200 selling 15,000 copies in its first week. In its second week the album sold 4,600 more copies. In its third week the album sold 3,000 more copies bringing its total to 23,000.

== Critical response ==
Professional ratings
Aggregate scores
Source	Rating
Metacritic	78/100
Review scores
Source	Rating
AllMusic	4.5/5 stars
The A.V. Club	A−
Exclaim!	8/10
Pitchfork	7.4/10
PopMatters	7/10
Q	4/5 stars
Rolling Stone	3.5/5 stars
Slant Magazine	4/5 stars
Spin	7/10
XXL	4/5 stars

Twelve Reasons to Die was met with critical acclaim upon its release. At Metacritic, which assigns a normalized rating out of 100 to reviews from mainstream critics, the album has received an average score of 78, based on 27 reviews, indicating "generally favorable reviews". David Jeffries of AllMusic gave the album four out of five stars, saying "While the album is best listened to in one go, these strong cuts could easily be parceled out for any career-spanning Ghostface mixtape [...] It's short and limited, but it's well crafted and strong." Edwin Ortiz of HipHopDX gave the album four out of five stars, writing "In the archives of Ghostface Killah’s catalog, Twelve Reasons To Die should place somewhere above his most recent releases. Unless an artist is approaching Illmatic territory, it’s difficult to glorify a project that clocks in under 40 minutes, with a third of the lyrical efforts dispensed to guests. Still, the album is a satisfying glimpse into the minds of Younge and Ghostface. Experimental is a tag few artists at his age would attempt, and yet Ghost does it with immeasurable confidence." Ken Capobianco of The Boston Globe gave the album a nine out of ten, saying, "The songs are short, so precision and concision are paramount, and the rhymes are sharp enough to slit veins. There's invention throughout, including “Center of Attraction’’ which reveals a metaphorical id/superego dialogue. While outstanding songs (“The Catastrophe’’) stand on their own, this is a song cycle that demands to be absorbed whole."

Consequence of Sound's Chris Coplan gave the album three out of five stars, saying "GFK’s real life story, his lyrical prowess, and his years of wisdom and insight are better than the sum of this concept album. Keeping him tied to a half-hearted story of ghostly gangsters and empty revenge plots is like the actual Iron Man only using the MK I armor when the Bleeding Edge armor is in the next room. Had GFK’s focus been on par with his corresponding hero’s repulsor beam, this record would’ve been more than a solid collection that fails in trying to make high-art with a half-hearted storyline." In a highly positive review, Tiny Mix Tapes reviewer Joe Hemmerling gave the album four and a half out of five stars, writing "Twelve Reasons to Die delivers spectacularly on its promise," and that it is one of the "bloodiest, most ambitious, and straight-up funnest hip-hop albums of 2013". Hip-hop magazine XXL gave the album an XL rating, praising the chemistry between Ghostface Killah and Adrian Younge, saying "12 Reasons to Die is a pitch-perfect pairing of Adrian Younge’s soulful production and Ghostface’s invigorated rhymes."

Jayson Greene of Pitchfork Media gave the album a 7.4 out of 10, saying, "Their chemistry is so apparent that it's a shame the final product isn't better. It reminds me of Freeway's The Stimulus Package, another seemingly can't-miss proposition from two phenomenal talents that fell just short. Like a lot of what Ghost has done in the past few years-- Apollo Kids, The Wizard of Poetry in Emerald City, and Wu-Massacre-- Twelve Reasons to Die basically feels like a victim of haste." Phillip Mlynar of Spin gave the album a seven out of ten, saying "This might all come across as critical nit-pickery on what's mostly a very good album, but the concept betrays the end listening experience, leaving the unshakable feeling that it could've been a six-track EP, not an over-padded full album. As one of Ghost's pals once put it, there's much virtue in being half-short and twice-strong." Evan Rytlewski of The A.V. Club gave the album an A−, saying "Following his smart score for the 2009 blaxploitation homage Black Dynamite and this year’s joint effort with Delphonics singer William Hart, Adrian Younge Presents The Delphonics, Twelve Reasons is Younge’s first foray into rap, but he takes to the genre like an old pro. Without removing Ghostface from his sweet spot, he’s built a lavish new playground for the rapper to indulge his harried depictions of slit throats, severed tongues, and bullet-torn flesh. In an era where it increasingly seems like rap albums are being rendered obsolete by mixtapes, this tightly focused, wildly entertaining collaboration between two master craftsmen is a testament to how powerful the form can still be."

=== Accolades ===
Closing out the year, Twelve Reasons to Die was named to multiple "Albums of the Year" lists. It was named the tenth best hip-hop album of 2013 by PopMatters. They commented saying, "Ghost has never been one to be understated and, depending on how you look at it, 12 Reasons to Die has the dumbest or coolest plot ever. The Godfather, noir films, and a whole lot of b-movies get melted together into a story where Tony Starks is resurrected through the power of vinyl and becomes the invincible Ghostface Killah. Oh yes, it’s batshit insane and Ghost revels in it. The only person on here that seems to enjoy it more is producer Adrian Younge. His score to Ghost’s tale is deeply influenced by equal parts Ennio Morricone and Curtis Mayfield. Snares that sound like gunshots, over-the-top gospel singing, and grimy bass lines bring a certain menace to every word that Ghost spits. Twelve Reasons is gritty, unflinching, and above all a blast. It’s a fantastic addition to the Clan’s mythos and one of their finest releases. All it needs is a proper theatre release."

It was ranked at number 19 on XXL's list of the best albums of 2013. They elaborated saying, "Tapping into Tony Starks, Ghostface Killah maintains vivid storytelling translated from comic-book form in Twelve Reasons to Die. With the help from producer/composer Adrian Younge, Ghostface’s use of heavy-sampling and a signature delivery with tracks like “Enemies All Around Me” and “An Unexpected Call” created a gritty and gripping concept album." HipHopDX deemed it one of the top 25 albums of 2013. They said, "If you’re in the habit of giving Yeezus an A-plus as an art-house Rap project, listen to how well-crafted and professionally executed this album is and reconsider your grading scale. Master craftsmen deliver masterful craftsmanship." The Source placed it at number 24 on their list, saying "teaming up with Adrian Younge and having RZA executively produce the project, helped to give it that classic feel, but Ghostface’s lyricism is what takes it to the next level. There is something about his screaming delivery that makes everything sound so raw."

== Track listing ==
- All songs produced by Adrian Younge, except "The Rise of the Ghostface Killah" co-produced by Bob Perry & Andrew Kelley

Twelve Reasons to Die track listing
No.	Title	Writer(s)	Length
1.	"Beware of the Stare"	Dennis David Coles; Adrian Younge	3:18
2.	"Rise of the Black Suits"	Coles; Younge	2:57
3.	"I Declare War" (featuring Masta Killa)	Coles; Jamel Irief; Younge	2:54
4.	"Blood on the Cobblestones" (featuring U-God and Inspectah Deck)	Coles; Lamont Jody Hawkins; Jason Richard Hunter; Younge	2:41
5.	"The Center of Attraction" (featuring Cappadonna)	Coles; Darryl Hill; Younge	4:05
6.	"Enemies All Around Me" (featuring William Hart)	Coles; William Hart; Younge	2:12
7.	"An Unexpected Call (The Set Up)" (featuring Inspectah Deck)	Coles; Hunter; Younge	2:34
8.	"Rise of the Ghostface Killah"	Coles; Younge; Bob Perry; Andrew Kelly	3:29
9.	"Revenge Is Sweet" (featuring Masta Killa and Killa Sin)	Coles; Irief; Jeryl Grant; Younge	5:06
10.	"Murder Spree" (featuring U-God, Masta Killa, Inspectah Deck & Killa Sin)	Coles; Hawkins; Irief; Hunter; Grant; Younge	2:50
11.	"The Sure Shot (Parts 1 and 2)"	Coles; Younge	3:44
12.	"12 Reasons to Die"	Coles; Younge	3:14
Total length:			39:04

== Personnel ==
Credits for Twelve Reasons to Die adapted from Allmusic.

- 9th Prince – project coordinator
- Anthony Acid – engineer
- Cappadonna – featured artist
- Dennis Coles – executive producer
- Dave Cooley – mastering
- Bob Frank – executive producer
- Ghostface Killah – primary artist
- William Hart – featured artist
- Inspectah Deck – featured artist
- Andrew Kelley – producer
- Killa Sin – featured artist
- Masta Killa – featured artist
- Logan Melissa – model
- Mike Caruso – executive producer
- Arnold Mischkulnig – engineer
- Stan Oh – design consultant
- Bob Perry – producer
- Jeff Rameau – engineer
- RZA – executive producer
- Zak Shelby-Szyszko – project manager
- U-God – featured artist
- Venice Dawn – primary artist
- Adrian Younge – composer, engineer, mixing, primary artist, producer

== Release history ==
Regions	Dates	Label(s)
United States	April 16, 2013	Soul Temple Records, RED Distribution
