= Slang Prostitution =

Studio album by Cappadonna
- Released: January 27, 2009
- Recorded: 2008
- Genre: Hip-hop
- Label: Chambermusik RED
- Producers: Soul Professor, Digem Tracks Productions, G-Clef Da Mad Komposa, 3rd Digala, Rush, Q-Dini, Blastah Beats, Chicargo, N.E.S., Todd Baker

Cappadonna chronology
The Cappatilize Project (2008)	Slang Prostitution (2009)	The Pilgrimage (2011)

Wu-Tang Clan solo chronology
Pro Tools (2008)	Slang Prostitution (2009)	Dopium (2009)

Professional ratings
Review scores
Source	Rating
*The Smoking Section	2/5 stars

Slang Prostitution is the fifth studio album released by New York based rapper and Wu-Tang Clan member Cappadonna. The only single of this album is "Somebody's Got To Go". The album was released on January 27, 2009.

== Track list ==
1. "You Can't Keep a Good Man Down (Part One)"
2. "Savage Life" (prod by Todd Baker)
3. "Three Knives" feat 3rd Digala & Lounge Lo (prod by Soul Professor)
4. "Walk with Me" feat Joey Lee (prod by Digem Tracks Productions)
5. "Do You Remember?"
6. "That Staten Island Shit" feat Lounge Lo (prod by Digem Tracks Productions)
7. "Stories" feat Jojo Pellegrino & 3rd Digala (prod by Digem Tracks Productions)
8. "Life's a Gamble" feat Raekwon and Rachet (prod by Rush)
9. "Hustle & Flow"
10. "You Can't Keep a Good Man Down (Part Two)"
11. "Pistachio" feat Lounge Lo, King Just & Mega Don(prod by Soul Professor)
12. "Grungy" feat G-Clef Da Mad Komposa (prod by Q-Dini)
13. "What's Really Up?"
14. "Da Vorzon" feat Lounge Lo & 3rd Digala (prod by Blastah Beats)
15. "Somebody Got to Go" feat Lounge Lo & Ghetto Philharmonic
16. "Fire" feat Masta Killa (prod by Chicargo)
17. "Speed Knots" feat Precise (prod by N.E.S.)
18. "Stay Shining" feat 3rd Digala
19. "You Can't Keep a Good Man Down (Part Three)"
