= The Cappatilize Project =

Studio album by Cappadonna
- Released: July 22, 2008
- Genre: Hip hop
- Label: Cappadonna/Park Hill Projects
- Producers: Big Zick, Spinzilla, Solo, Sosa, Q-Dini, Fontane, Danjah Mentals, Sparx, B-Rock

Cappadonna chronology
The Struggle (2003)	The Cappatilize Project (2008)	Slang Prostitution (2009)

Wu-Tang Clan solo chronology
Digi Snacks (2008)	The Cappatilize Project (2008)	Pro Tools (2008)

The Cappatilize Project is the fourth studio album by American rapper and Wu-Tang Clan member Cappadonna. The album was released on July 22, 2008.

== Track listing ==
1. "Cap's Back Again"
2. "The Anointing"
3. "Don't Turn Around" (featuring Q-Dini)
4. "Peace God" (featuring Born Divine)
5. "Get Paper" (featuring Lounge Lo)
6. "If You Don't Stop" (featuring Born Divine)
7. "One Night Love Affair"
8. "Growth and Development" (featuring Hue Hefna & Lahluga)
9. "Dream"
10. "Gotta Find A Way" (featuring Born Divine & MPM)
11. "Wanted" (featuring KMC)
12. "Goon Skwad"
13. "Tug Dat Rope"
14. "My Gang" (featuring Born Divine & The Better Lifers)
15. "Holdin'" (featuring Lounge Lo)
