= A Son Unique =

Studio album by Ol' Dirty Bastard
- Released: June 21, 2005 (Digitally)
- Genre: Hip-hop
- Length: 44:24
- Labels: Damon Dash; Roc-A-Fella; Island Def Jam; UMG
- Producers: Mark Ronson; DJ Premier; Pharrell Williams; RZA; Rockwilder; Damon Elliott; Dame Grease; Soul Diggaz

Ol' Dirty Bastard chronology
Osirus (2005)	A Son Unique (2005)

Wu-Tang Clan solo chronology
No Said Date (2004)	A Son Unique (2005)	Mr. Xcitement (2005)

Singles from A Son Unique
- 1. "Intoxicated" Released: 2004; 2. "ODB, Don't Go Breaking My Heart" Released: 2005

Professional ratings
Review scores
Source	Rating
Rolling Stone	3/5 stars
Vibe	4/5 stars

A Son Unique is the only unreleased studio album by Ol' Dirty Bastard, originally meant to be his third album. It was supposed to be released as his third album after ODB's death in 2004 but was eventually shelved. It was meant to be distributed by label owner Damon Dash. However, label issues prevented the album's release. Despite this, it has been available as a digital download and promo CDs had been circulating on the resale market.

== Background ==
On the day of its planned release, A Son Unique was made available on iTunes. The release was eventually cancelled by ODB's label, Roc-A-Fella. The album was finally going to be released in November 2009 to commemorate the fifth anniversary of ODB's death, but eventually got delayed again. As of 2025, A Son Unique has never been physically released, but available on digital music distribution services.

Before releasing A Son Unique, ODB changed his stage name from Ol' Dirty Bastard to Dirt McGirt. The working title for the album was Dirt McGirt.

== Track listing ==
A Son Unique track listing
No.	Title	Writer(s)	Producer(s)	Length
1.	"Lift Your Skirt" (featuring Missy Elliott)	Russell Tyrone Jones; Melissa Arnette Elliott	Mark Ronson	2:40
2.	"Pop Shots" (featuring Lil' Fame)	Jones; Jamal Grinnage	DJ Premier	3:38
3.	"Operator" (featuring The Clipse)	Jones; Gene Elliott Thornton Jr.; Terrence LeVarr Thornton; Pharrell Lanscilo Williams	The Neptunes	4:02
4.	"Back in the Air" (featuring Ghostface Killah)	Jones; Dennis David Coles	RZA	4:04
5.	"Work for Me" (featuring Young Chris)	Jones; Christopher Francis Ries	Rockwilder	4:01
6.	"ODB, Don't Go Breaking My Heart" (featuring Macy Gray)	Jones; Natalie Renée McIntyre; Damon William Elliott	Damon Elliott	3:39
7.	"Stomp" (featuring RZA)	Jones; Robert Fitzgerald Diggs	RZA	2:46
8.	"How Ya Feelin' Dirty"	Jones	Damon Elliott	3:10
9.	"Intoxicated" (featuring Raekwon, Method Man & Macy Gray)	Jones; Corey Woods; Clifford Smith, Jr.	RZA	4:18
10.	"Dirty and Grimey" (featuring N.O.R.E.)	Jones; Victor James Santiago, Jr.; Kasseem Daoud Dean	Dame Grease	3:31
11.	"Danger Zone" (featuring Joe Budden)	Jones; Joseph Anthony Budden II	Boola	2:57
12.	"Skrilla" (featuring RZA)	Jones; Diggs	RZA	2:57
13.	"Don't Hurt Me" (featuring Rhymefest)	Jones; Che Armond Smith	Soul Diggaz	2:49
Total length:				44:24

== Possible Leftover Songs ==
- “Why You Build Me Up?” (Solo Version). Was later released on Rhymefest’s 2006 album “Blue Collar” only appearing singing the chorus.

- “Osirus” (Lyrical Virus) 2 versions of the song were released. • Lyrical Virus (Produced By : J-Love) released on Osirus : The Official Mixtape. • Osirus was Released on O.D.B.’s compilation album “Message to the Other Side – Osirus Part 1”.

- “Coochie Banging” (featuring Ludacris) Remixed Version released on The Black Keys 2009 album “BlackRoc”

- “No More (Wasted Time)” (Unreleased) Produced By : Unknown

- “High In The Clouds” (featuring Black Rob) Released on Osirus : The Official Mixtape.

- “Dirty, Dirty” (featuring Rhymefest) Released on Osirus : The Official Mixtape.

- “Who Can Make It Happen Like Dirt” Released on Osirus : The Official Mixtape.

- "Welcome Home" was one of the first songs he recorded when he got released from Prison. shares the same beat as Lumidee's 2003 song "Never Leave You (Uh Oooh, Uh Oooh)"
