= The W =

Studio album by Wu-Tang Clan
- Released: November 21, 2000
- Recorded: October 1999 – September 2000
- Studios: 36 Chambers (New York; Track Record (Los Angeles, CA}
- Genres: East Coast hip-hop; hardcore hip-hop
- Length: 59:04
- Labels: Loud; Columbia
- Producers: RZA; Mathematics

Wu-Tang Clan chronology
Wu-Tang Forever (1997)	The W (2000)	Iron Flag (2001)

Singles from The W
- 1. "Protect Ya Neck (The Jump Off)" Released: October 17, 2000; 2. "Gravel Pit" Released: December 5, 2000; 3. "I Can't Go To Sleep" Released: January 18, 2001; 4. "Careful (Click, Click)" Released: July 17, 2001

The W is the third studio album by American hip-hop group Wu-Tang Clan. It was released on November 21, 2000, by Loud Records and Columbia Records. After their 1997 album Wu-Tang Forever, several of the group's members released solo projects before The W, which has a more rugged, less polished sound than that of most Wu-Tang related albums from that era. The album also features guest appearances from Isaac Hayes, Redman, Nas, Busta Rhymes, Snoop Dogg and Junior Reid. It is the group's last album to feature Ol' Dirty Bastard before his death in 2004, as he was absent from their next album, Iron Flag (2001).

The album debuted at number five on the Billboard 200, and number one on the Top R&B/Hip Hop Albums chart with 301,000 copies sold in the first week. It produced several singles, which also charted as well. The album was certified platinum by the Recording Industry Association of America (RIAA). Upon its release, The W received largely positive reviews from most music critics based on an aggregate score of 80/100 from Metacritic.

== Critical reception ==
Professional ratings
Aggregate scores
Source	Rating
Metacritic	80/100
Review scores
Source	Rating
AllMusic	4.5/5 stars
Entertainment Weekly	B+
The Guardian	4/5 stars
Los Angeles Times	2.5/4 stars
NME	8/10
Rolling Stone	4/5 stars
The Rolling Stone Album Guide	4.5/5 stars
Spin	8/10
USA Today	3/4 stars
The Village Voice	A−

The W received generally positive reviews from music critics. At Metacritic, which assigns a normalized rating out of 100 to reviews from mainstream critics, the album received an average score of 80, based on 17 reviews. Aside from calling Wu-Tang "the best rap group ever," Kris Ex of Rolling Stone called the album "A sonic gestalt that exists somewhere between the Queensbridge projects and OutKast's Stankonia." Entertainment Weekly's David Browne remarked that the members sound "utterly mellow on their third album." He further stated "The W forgoes innovation and simply revels in the Clan's strengths: the way their star rappers toss around rhymes as if playing catch; RZA's skulking, string-enhanced beats." Kelefa Sanneh of The Village Voice declared it "The best-produced Wu-affiliated album since GZA's 1995 Liquid Swords. Rob Fearn of Q stated "The W is largely a return to murky idiosyncratic form after 1997's filler-bloated Wu-Tang Forever. Weighing in at a svelte 60 minutes, it plays to the group's main strengths: brutal hooks and scary ambience." Dave Heaton of PopMatters described it as "the sound of a group growing up and realizing that collaboration can lead to endless creativity" and commented on its significance in the group's catalogue, stating:

The Wu-Tang Clan of today is not the same as the Clan of 1993. And for this, we are blessed. Every Wu-Tang Clan member is growing as an MC as the years go by. Put them all together again now, after they've each done their own things separately, and you get an entirely new dynamic, a mix of the dark and the bright.

Despite commenting that "The W isn't quite the masterpiece it sounds like after the first few tracks [...] it falls prey to inconsistency, resulting in half-formed tracks", AllMusic editor John Bush praised the album's "back-to-basics approach", writing that it succeeds "not only because it rightly puts the focus back on the best cadre of rappers in the world of hip-hop, but also because RZA's immense trackmaster talents can't help but shine through [...] When they're hitting on all cylinders, Wu-Tang Clan are nearly invincible." Steve Jones of USA Today called it "sharply focused." S. H. Fernando Jr. of Vibe called it "a dense, demented, 15-song opus that will now draw comparisons to the now classic 36 Chambers." He further noted its "originality, innovation, and a mastery of the fundamentals of beats and rhymes", and commented "This album goes against the grain of everything that's going on in rap right now". Sasha Frere-Jones of Spin complimented RZA's diverse range of production and the group's word play; in The Rolling Stone Album Guide, Frere-Jones called the production "possibly RZA's most consistent yet." In his consumer guide for The Village Voice, critic Robert Christgau commented that he "can't swear they've taken their moral vision much beyond 'Handle your bid and kill no kids'", but praised RZA's production and stated "He serves up a bounty of song-centered musique trouvée and stomach-churning beats from anywhere [...] Far from straining, he's gone sensei, achieving a craft in which the hand leads the mind".

=== Accolades ===
The W appeared on Albums of the Year lists by several American publishers, such as Rolling Stone, Spin, and The Village Voice. The album also appeared on the same lists for several international publishers, such as NME, The Wire, and Uncut from the United Kingdom, and Liberation and Les Inrockuptibles from France, for which it was ranked number one in the latter. In 2005, Hip Hop Connection ranked the album number 70 on their 100 Greatest Rap Albums 1995–2005 list. One year later, the album was included in Gary Mulholland's book The 261 Greatest Albums Since Punk and Disco. In 2009, Pitchfork ranked it number 162 on their Top 200 Albums of the 2000s list, stating "The W was as surprising as it was pleasing, packing some of the RZA's best production work, and some of the group's best music."

== Commercial performance ==
The W debuted at number five on the US Billboard 200, and number one on the US Top R&B/Hip Hop Albums charts, selling 301,000 copies in the first week. On December 14, 2000, the album was certified platinum by the Recording Industry Association of America (RIAA) for shipments of over a million copies in the United States. As of April 2014, the album has sold 1.1 million copies in the United States.

== Track listing ==
Track listing information is taken from the official liner notes and AllMusic. All tracks produced by RZA, except where noted.

The W
No.	Title	Writer(s)	Performer(s)	Length
1.	": Intro (Shaolin Finger Jab)"; "Chamber Music; "	Wu-Tang Clan	GZA; Masta Killa; Method Man; Raekwon	4:26
2.	"Careful (Click, Click)" (featuring Cappadonna)	Wu-Tang Clan	Ghostface Killah; Inspectah Deck; Masta Killa; RZA; U-God	4:56
3.	"Hollow Bones"	Wu-Tang Clan	Ghostface Killah; Inspectah Deck; Raekwon	3:37
4.	"Redbull" (featuring Redman)	Wu-Tang Clan; Reginald Noble	Inspectah Deck; Method Man	3:53
5.	"One Blood Under W" (featuring Junior Reid)	Wu-Tang Clan; Delroy Reid	Masta Killa	4:11
6.	"Conditioner" (featuring Snoop Dogg)	Wu-Tang Clan; Calvin Broadus	GZA; Inspectah Deck; Ol' Dirty Bastard	5:32
7.	"Protect Ya Neck (The Jump Off)" (featuring Cappadonna)	Wu-Tang Clan	Cappadonna; Ghostface Killah; GZA; Inspectah Deck; Masta Killa; Method Man; Raekwon; RZA; U-God	3:58
8.	"Let My Niggas Live" (featuring Nas)	Wu-Tang Clan; Nasir Jones	Inspectah Deck; Raekwon	4:29
9.	"I Can't Go to Sleep" (featuring Isaac Hayes)	Wu-Tang Clan; Isaac Hayes	Ghostface Killah; RZA	3:35
10.	"Do You Really (Thang, Thang)" (produced by Mathematics)	Wu-Tang Clan; Ronald Bean	Inspectah Deck; Masta Killa; Method Man	5:22
11.	"The Monument" (featuring Busta Rhymes)	Wu-Tang Clan; Trevor Smith	GZA; Raekwon	2:38
12.	"Gravel Pit"	Wu-Tang Clan; Paulissa Moorman	Ghostface Killah; Method Man; Paulissa Moorman; Raekwon; RZA; U-God	4:51
13.	": Jah World" (featuring Junior Reid); "	Wu-Tang Clan	Ghostface Killah; RZA	3:51
Total length:				55:18

CD Bonus Track
No.	Title	Writer(s)	Performer(s)	Length
14.	": Clap; " (produced by Mathematics) (hidden track)	Wu-Tang Clan	Ghostface Killah; Method Man; Raekwon	3:46

Notes

- "Do You Really (Thang, Thang)" features raps by Street Life and uncredited vocals by DJ Kay Slay.
- "Gravel Pit" features additional vocals by Paulissa Moorman.
- "Jah World" contains the uncredited hidden bonus track "Clap", produced by Allah Mathematics.

Sample credits

- "Intro (Shaolin Finger Jab)" contains dialogue Five Deadly Venoms.
- "Hollow Bones" contains a sample of "Is It Because I'm Black" by Syl Johnson.
- "One Blood Under W" contains samples of "It's Okay (One Blood)" by Junior Reid, and a sample of "James Bond Theme" by The John Barry Orchestra.
- "Protect Ya Neck (The Jump Off)" contains samples of "Sing a Simple Song" by Sly and the Family Stone and "Oh, Pretty Woman" by Albert King.
- "I Can’t Go to Sleep" contains a sample of "Walk On By" by Isaac Hayes.
- "Do You Really (Thang, Thang)" contains a sample of "Hang On Sloopy" by David Porter.

== Personnel ==
- RZA – performer, producer, executive producer
- GZA – performer
- Ol' Dirty Bastard – performer
- Method Man – performer
- Raekwon – performer
- Ghostface Killah – performer, executive producer
- Inspectah Deck – performer
- U-God – performer
- Masta Killa – performer
- Cappadonna – performer
- Junior Reid – performer
- Redman – performer
- Nas – performer
- Isaac Hayes – performer

- Busta Rhymes – performer
- Snoop Dogg – performer
- Streetlife – performer
- Paulissa Moorman – vocals
- DJ Kayslay – performer
- Mathematics – producer
- Oli Grant – executive producer
- James Cruz – mastering
- Dylan Dresdow – tracking engineer, mixing engineer
- Jose Reynoso – engineer
- Michael Lavine – photography
- David Bett – package design
- Liz Hausle – product manager
- Monica Morrow – Stylist

== Charts ==
=== Weekly charts ===
Chart (2000–2001)	Peak position
Australian Albums (ARIA)	51
Australian Dance Albums (ARIA)	14
Austrian Albums (Ö3 Austria)	13
Belgian Albums (Ultratop Flanders)	16
Canadian Albums (Billboard)	9
Dutch Albums (Album Top 100)	15
Finnish Albums (Suomen virallinen lista)	33
French Albums (SNEP)	13
German Albums (Offizielle Top 100)	11
Irish Albums (IRMA)	1
New Zealand Albums (RMNZ)	37
Norwegian Albums (VG-lista)	34
Swedish Albums (Sverigetopplistan)	37
Swiss Albums (Schweizer Hitparade)	24
UK R&B Albums (Official Charts)	1
UK Albums (Official Charts)	19
US Billboard 200	5
US Top R&B/Hip-Hop Albums (Billboard)	1

=== Year-end charts ===
Chart (2000)	Position
Canadian Albums (Nielsen SoundScan)	150

Chart (2001)	Position
Belgian Albums (Ultratop Flanders)	68
Canadian R&B Albums (Nielsen SoundScan)	83
US Billboard 200	95
US Top R&B/Hip-Hop Albums (Billboard)	50

== Certifications ==
Region	Certification	Certified units/sales
Canada (Music Canada)	Gold	50,000^{^}
Germany (BVMI)	Gold	150,000^{^}
United Kingdom (BPI)	Gold	100,000^{^}
United States (RIAA)	Platinum	1,000,000^{^}
^{^} Shipments figures based on certification alone.
