= The Pilgrimage (album) =

Studio album by Cappadonna
- Released: November 15, 2011
- Recorded: 2010–2011
- Genre: Hip hop
- Length: 45:38
- Labels: Chamber Musik, Fat Beats Records, Soulspazm Inc.

Cappadonna chronology
Slang Prostitution (2009)	The Pilgrimage (2011)	Eyrth, Wynd and Fyre (2013)

Wu-Tang Clan solo chronology
Shaolin vs. Wu-Tang (2010)	The Pilgrimage (2011)	Selling My Soul (2012)

The Pilgrimage is the sixth studio album by American rapper and Wu-Tang Clan member Cappadonna. It was released on November 15, 2011. The album features guest appearances from Matlock, Killa Black, Chedda Bang, Solomon Childs, Inspectah Deck and Elite.

== Track listing ==
No.	Title	Length
1.	"A-Alike B-Alike C-Alike"	3:33
2.	"Dart Imports"	2:40
3.	"Energy Guard"	3:10
4.	"Hoody Hoodpecker" (featuring Matlock & Killa Black)	3:47
5.	"Good Wine" (featuring Chedda Bang)	2:08
6.	"Put God First" (featuring Solomon Childs & Inspectah Deck)	4:03
7.	"Hold On"	2:58
8.	"Honey's Look Good" (featuring Inspectah Deck)	4:12
9.	"For You" (featuring Killa Black)	4:05
10.	"Friendemies" (featuring Chedda Bang)	3:59
11.	"Can't Believe It's Him"	4:31
12.	"Cuban Link Kings"	3:36
13.	"Trials & Tribulations" (featuring Killa Black & Elite)	2:56
Total length:		45:38
