= Dopium =

Studio album by U-God
- Released: June 23, 2009
- Recorded: 2007–2009
- Genre: Hip-hop
- Length: 51:39
- Labels: Frank Radio; Babygrande
- Producers: Teddy Ted; J. Serbe; The Twilite Tone; 4th Pyramid; Large Professor; Hak Da Navigator

U-God chronology
Mr. Xcitement (2005)	Dopium (2009)	The Keynote Speaker (2013)

Wu-Tang Clan solo chronology
Slang Prostitution (2009)	Dopium (2009)	Only Built 4 Cuban Linx... Pt. II (2009)

Dopium is the third solo studio album by Wu-Tang Clan member U-God. The album was released on June 23, 2009. The album features guest appearances from Method Man, Ghostface Killah, GZA, Killah Priest, Raekwon, Cappadonna, Jim Jones, Large Professor, Slaine and Sheek Louch.

== Critical reception ==
Professional ratings
Review scores
Source	Rating
AllMusic	2/5 stars
HipHopDX	3/5 stars
RapReviews	7.5/10

Matt Rinaldi of AllMusic praised the album's first-half for the "Shaolin soul" on the opening three tracks and other quality tracks like "Coke" and "Magnum Force", but felt it falters after the midpoint and delivers "one disappointment after another" in the second-half, concluding that: "With only four or five cuts that could be called certified dope, as far as second tier Wu-Tang albums go, Dopium belongs in the "skip" column." HipHopDX writer Athorton was also commendable towards the album's first-half, but felt the hooks were "unimaginative placeholders" to "frequently interchangeable" verses, and was critical of U-God moving towards "radio friendly" material, concluding that: "There will surely be more exciting releases this year, but the half dozen decent songs are worth a few spins." John-Michael Bond of RapReviews praised U-God for elevating his lyricism to not only stay on par with his guest artists but even out rhyme them, highlighting "Train Trussle" and "Coke", saying: "Add "Dopium" to the list of high value releases from the Clan, U-God has managed to kick his way out off the Clan's 3rd string bench leaving his previous spot far behind."

== Track listing ==
Dopium track listing
No.	Title	Writer(s)	Producer(s)	Length
1.	"Train Trussle" (featuring Ghostface Killah and Scotty Wotty)	Lamont Jody Hawkins; Dennis David Coles; Samuel Regis	Teddy Ted; J. Serbe	4:54
2.	"God is Love" (featuring Cappadonna and Killah Priest)	Hawkins; Daryl Hill; Walter Reed	Teddy Ted; J. Serbe	3:51
3.	"Stomp da Roach" (featuring GZA and Scotty Wotty)	Hawkins; Gary Eldridge Grice; Regis	Teddy Ted; J. Serbe	3:24
4.	"Lipton" (featuring Mike Ladd)	Hawkins; Mike Ladd	4th Pyramid	3:21
5.	"Coke" (featuring Raekwon and Slaine)	Hawkins; Corey Woods; George Carroll	Da Beathoven	4:00
6.	"Magnum Force" (featuring Jim Jones and Sheek Louch)	Hawkins; Joseph Guillermo Jones II; Sean Divine Jacobs	Hak Da Navigator	4:13
7.	"Hips"	Hawkins	The Twilite Tone	3:18
8.	"Wu-Tang" (featuring Method Man)	Hawkins; Clifford Smith, Jr.	DZ; Andre Clarke	3:03
9.	"Dopium"	Hawkins	Teddy Ted; J. Serbe	3:18
10.	"Rims Pokin' Out" (featuring Letha Face)	Hawkins; Orlando Irizzary	The Twilite Tone	4:18
11.	"New Classic" (featuring Large Professor)	Hawkins	Large Professor	1:59
12.	"Stomp da Roach" (The Bloody Beetroots Remix; featuring GZA and Scotty Wotty)	Hawkins; Grice; Regis	The Bloody Beetroots	2:42
13.	"Dopium" (Yuksek Remix)	Hawkins	Yuksek	3:42
14.	"Hips" (Felix Cartal Remix)	Hawkins	Felix Cartal	5:33
15.	"Coke" (DZ Remix; featuring Raekwon)	Hawkins; Woods	DZ	4:17
16.	"Wu-Tang" (DZ Remix; featuring Method Man)	Hawkins; Smith, Jr.	DZ	4:20
Total length:				51:39

== Charts ==
Chart (2009)	Peak position
US Top R&B/Hip-Hop Albums (Billboard)	93
