= The Heart Gently Weeps =

2007 single by Wu-Tang Clan

Single by Wu-Tang Clan featuring Erykah Badu, Dhani Harrison and John Frusciante

from the album 8 Diagrams
- Released: October 3, 2007
- Recorded: 2007
- Genre: Hip hop; R&B
- Length: 5:05
- Label: SRC/Universal Motown
- Songwriter(s): Wu-Tang Clan, George Harrison
- Producer(s): RZA

Wu-Tang Clan singles chronology
"Gravel Pit" (2000)	"The Heart Gently Weeps" (2007)	"Take It Back" (2007)

Erykah Badu singles chronology
"Get Live" (2006)	"The Heart Gently Weeps" (2007)	"Honey" (2007)

John Frusciante singles chronology
"The Heart Gently Weeps" (2007)

Dhani Harrison singles chronology
"The Heart Gently Weeps" (2007)

"The Heart Gently Weeps" is the first single from the 2007 album 8 Diagrams by the Wu-Tang Clan. The song interpolates the Beatles' song "While My Guitar Gently Weeps". It features guest appearances from three other musicians: R&B singer Erykah Badu sings the song's chorus; Dhani Harrison, son of Beatle lead guitarist and vocalist George, plays acoustic guitar; and John Frusciante of the Red Hot Chili Peppers is featured on lead guitar. This song was made using a cover version of the George Harrison song played by the blues guitarist Jimmy Ponder.

Out of respect for George Harrison, RZA, who produced this song, asked Dhani to play rhythm guitar. It was played using a mint condition Gretsch guitar from 1961 which was given to RZA as a gift from Russell Crowe after they had finished filming American Gangster. Wu-Tang Clan initially announced that the song sampled the Beatles, before revising their statement to say it was a "replay".

The song was #50 on Rolling Stone's list of the 100 Best Songs of 2007.

== Chart position ==
Chart (2007)	Peak position
Hot Canadian Digital Singles	71
