= Eyrth, Wynd and Fyre =

Studio album by Cappadonna
- Released: February 26, 2013
- Recorded: 2012–2013
- Genre: Hip-hop
- Length: 84:30
- Labels: RBC; E1
- Producers: J. Glaze, Whaul, Keelay & Zaire, Cosmos Shines, Chris Bay, DJ Snips, Kevlaar 7, Stu Bangas, G-Force

Cappadonna chronology
The Pilgrimage (2011)	Eyrth, Wynd and Fyre (2013)	Hook Off (2014)

Wu-Tang Clan solo chronology
Selling My Soul (2012)	Eyrth, Wynd and Fyre (2013)	The Keynote Speaker (2013)

Eyrth, Wynd and Fyre is the seventh studio album by American rapper and Wu-Tang Clan member Cappadonna. It was released on February 26, 2013. The album features guest appearances from Show Stopper, Solomon Childs, Lounge Mode and Sav Killz. With production coming from J. Glaze, Whaul, DJ Snips, Stu Bangas and Kevlaar 7 among others.

== Background ==
In December 2012, during an interview with AllHipHop Cappadonna explained what to expect from the album saying:

"I believe this one right here, I leaned back a little on it. I just got more into the message and the music man, and just tried to focus on that a little more – production by J. Glaze. I kind of was just really free in the mind when I did this CD right here – Eyrth, Wynd & Fyre – those are elements right there. That fire’a that truth, and that wind, that’s the substance, and the Earth is the strength that keeps me grounded. So these elements right here exist within my style and life, what I had to go through, so I got that and I got the other double CD with DJ Snips and J-Ronin and of those producers, good looking out for J-Ronin on A&R’ing the project. But yeah, things is right, man."

== Critical response ==
Professional ratings
Review scores
Source	Rating
AllMusic	3/5 stars
HipHopDX	3/5 stars

Eyrth, Wynd and Fyre was met with generally mixed reviews from music critics. Omar Burgess of HipHopDX gave the album three out of five stars, saying "Age has suited Cappadonna well. He’ll dole out advice, but not money, to the stripper on his lap (“Pull Ya Life Together”) and praise the mothers of his children (“Baby Mommas”). And “Ease On Down The Road” finds him mixing a standard from The Wiz with modern maxims about Ne-Yo. But with 28 tracks to slog through, the times when Cappa and his producers are admittedly “asleep at them wheels” detracts from the overall product. Ultimately, Cappadonna’s most loyal supporters will find themselves buying this one and pairing down [sic] the highlights to a single CD or playlist." David Jeffries of AllMusic gave the album three out of five stars, saying "Fans should think of the release accordingly and get ready for both the thrill of victory and the agony of too many extras."

== Track listing ==
Disc 1
No.	Title	Producer(s)	Length
1.	"Real Life"	J. Glaze	3:25
2.	"The Body Rock"	J. Glaze	3:17
3.	"Boogah Hill"	J. Glaze	3:24
4.	"Hustle Game Tight"	J. Glaze	3:30
5.	"The Better Life Movement"	J. Glaze	3:14
6.	"Pull Ya Life Together"	J. Glaze	3:02
7.	"Puffed On Pride"	J. Glaze	3:38
8.	"Creature Feature"	J. Glaze	2:54
9.	"In The Dungeon" (featuring Show Stopper)	J. Glaze	2:44
10.	"Rap Is Like Crack" (featuring Soloman Childs)	J. Glaze	2:25
11.	"God Forgive Me For My Sins"	J. Glaze	4:55
12.	"Back To School"	Whaul	3:01
13.	"Children of Israel" (featuring Show Stopper)	J. Glaze	3:49
14.	"Net Surfin'" (featuring Show Stopper)	J. Glaze	3:41

Disc 2
No.	Title	Producer(s)	Length
1.	"Free Lunch" (featuring Lounge Mode)	Keelay & Zaire	1:36
2.	"Real Talk" (featuring Lounge Mode)	Cosmos Shines	3:46
3.	"Welfare" (featuring Sav Killz)	Chris Bay	2:42
4.	"Bar B Que" (featuring Lounge Mode)	DJ Snips	2:46
5.	"Actual Facts" (featuring Sav Killz)	DJ Snips	1:43
6.	"Rep Ya Borough" (featuring Lounge Mode)	Kevlaar 7	2:53
7.	"Live Ya Life" (featuring Lounge Mode)	Cosmos Shines	2:49
8.	"Chains"	Stu Bangas	1:26
9.	"Socializing" (featuring Lounge Mode)	Keelay & Zaire	2:36
10.	"It's A Man’s World"	Kevlaar 7	2:18
11.	"Baby Mommas"	Keelay & Zaire	3:53
12.	"Ease On Down The Road"	Keelay & Zaire	2:22
13.	"We Hood Rich Now"	Stu Bangas	2:40
14.	"Uncle Gem's Rice"	G-Force	4:03
