= Mr. Xcitement =

Studio album by U-God
- Released: September 13, 2005
- Recorded: 2004–2005
- Genre: Hip-hop
- Length: 49:17
- Label: Free Agency
- Producers: Leathafase; DJ Homicide; Mike Baiardi; The Produkt; 4th Disciple; CUETRAX (q-tracks)

U-God chronology
| UGodz-Illa Presents: The Hillside Scramblers (2004) | Mr. Xcitement (2005) | Dopium (2009) |

Wu-Tang Clan solo chronology
| A Son Unique (2005) | Mr. Xcitement (2005) | Fishscale (2006) |

Mr. Xcitement is the second solo studio album by Wu-Tang Clan member U-God. The album was released on September 13, 2005.

== Background ==
He left Priority after the label shut down and signed with Free Agency Recordings. It is his first album to feature no production input from the RZA. The only Wu-Tang related appearance on the album is production on one track by 4th Disciple.

== Release and reception ==
U-God has himself expressed in interviews that he does not consider Mr. Xcitement to be an official solo album, due to being displeased with the production and outcome. The album has only sold 5,500 units and also had sample clearance problems. The album is now out of print, however, copies can still can be found circulating on discogs and ebay.

== Track listing ==
Mr. Xcitement track listing
| No. | Title | Writer(s) | Producer(s) | Length |
|---|---|---|---|---|
| 1. | "Blow Yo Mind Intro" | Lamont Jody Hawkins | DJ Homicide | 1:07 |
| 2. | "It's a Wrap" (featuring Letha Face) | Hawkins; Orlando Irizarry | DJ Homicide | 2:28 |
| 3. | "Hit 'Em Up, Roll Out" (featuring Letha Face) | Hawkins; Irizarry | DJ Homicide | 3:23 |
| 4. | "Get Down" (featuring MC Eiht, Squeak Ru & Boo Kapone) | Hawkins; Aaron Bernard Tyler; Marcus Moore; Charles Trottman | The Produkt | 3:38 |
| 5. | "Don King Speaks To U-God (Skit)" | Hawkins; Donald King | | 1:49 |
| 6. | "I'm Talkin' To You" | Hawkins | DJ Homicide | 3:14 |
| 7. | "Kick Azz" | Hawkins | The Produkt | 2:18 |
| 8. | "You Don't Want To Dance" | Hawkins | Mike Baiardi | 4:13 |
| 9. | "Go Get Pretty Like Me" | Hawkins | Mike Baiardi | 3:16 |
| 10. | "A Long Time Ago" (featuring Ebony Burke) | Hawkins; Ebony Nicole Burks | 4th Disciple | 2:56 |
| 11. | "Stop (Carry On)" (featuring Ebony Burke) | Hawkins; Burks | Mike Baiardi | 3:27 |
| 12. | "Bump" | Hawkins | Letha Face | 3:27 |
| 13. | "Dedication Skit" | Hawkins | cuetrax | 1:15 |
| 14. | "Don't Love the Drugs" | Hawkins | Letha Face | 4:47 |
| 15. | "Heart of Stone" | Hawkins | Letha Face | 3:46 |
| 16. | "Jenny" | Hawkins | Letha Face | 4:13 |
| Total length: | | | | 49:17 |
