= The Keynote Speaker =

Studio album by U-God
- Released: July 23, 2013
- Recorded: 2012–2013
- Genre: Hip-hop
- Length: 48:33
- Label: Soul Temple
- Producers: RZA (also exec.); Leaf Dog; Blastah Beatz; Teddy Powell; DJ Homicide; Steve Reaves; J Reynoso Jr.; J. Serbe

U-God chronology
Dopium (2009)	The Keynote Speaker (2013)	Venom (2018)

Wu-Tang Clan solo chronology
Eyrth, Wynd and Fyre (2013)	The Keynote Speaker (2013)	Hook Off (2014)

Alternative covers

The Keynote Speaker is the fourth studio album by American rapper and Wu-Tang Clan member U-God. The album was released on July 23, 2013, by Soul Temple Records. The album features guest appearances from GZA, Method Man, Styles P, Inspectah Deck, Elzhi and Kool Keith among others.

== Background ==
In July 2013, during an interview with HipHopDX, U-God described the album, saying: "Oh, this is fire! I tried to step it up a notch every time I put out a new record, and this one is like a brand new baby, man. It has legs, and it’s going to stand up on its own. It’s really deep, and it’s really good, man—more or less, I’m just happy with it. If you want good, Hood Rap rhymes, it’s on there…banging beats and Wu-sounding shit is on there. I’ve got Method Man, Deck, GZA and my man Jackpot on there. I’ve got RZA production on there; he executive produced it. I’ve got mashed potatoes and gravy, Styles P on there. It’s all in there…good money."

He also explained where the title of the album came from, saying: "I can’t do what somebody else is doing. I can only do what the fans want from me, which is hard-body rhymes and raw shit. I didn’t put any club bangers on this one. As a matter fact, I think I might have one, but I didn’t make it like, “This is a club banger.” I didn't make it like that. I just do what I do. Now I know exactly what they want from me, and I gave it to ‘em with this Keynote Speaker. That’s why I called it Keynote Speaker, because I’m stepping to the podium, and I’m giving you a speech. You know how President Obama goes to the podium? Keynote Speaker, that’s what I’m doing. That’s basically what it’s about."

== Critical response ==
Professional ratings
Review scores
Source	Rating
AllMusic	3.5/5 stars
HipHopDX	2.5/5 stars
RapReviews	6.5/10

The Keynote Speaker was met with mixed reviews from music critics. Ronald Grant of HipHopDX gave the album two and half stars out of five, saying "The final analysis on Keynote Speaker is that it’s an album with some stellar moments courtesy of guest appearances and from U-God himself. But the project fundamentally misses the mark in several areas, be it the hit-or-miss beats and lack of consistency in overall production quality or U-God’s habit of falling into lackadaisical emceeing. Rest assured that the total legacy of Wu Tang is very much in tact [sic], but U-God unfortunately hasn’t added much to it with his latest set of music." Jaroslav Lavick of RapReviews gave the album a 6.5 out of 10, saying "There is little doubt that U-God will never attain the popularity of Ghostface or Method Man, but it seems he's proud of what he's achieved, where he is now, and where he's headed, and he's not shy to let us know about it on "The Keynote Speaker". Rather than just talking about himself for the majority of the album I wouldn't have minded touches of social commentary also (similar to what Cappadonna showed on "Eyrth, Wynd and Fyre"), as he's getting older and wiser, but then maybe U-God is simply never going to be that kind of rapper. After all, if his music maintains this level of high quality he can be telling us he walks on water and I'd play along with it, I just hope this album convinces a few more people to pay some deserved attention to his solo work."

David Jeffries of AllMusic gave the album three and a half stars out of five, saying "U-God has long been one of the lesser-known MCs in the massive Wu-Tang Clan, and while the urgent, alive, and altogether awesome moments of Keynote Speaker suggest he's certifiably "slept on," there are enough redundant numbers on this 50-minute release to put him back in the category of "acquired taste." Acquire the taste for hard-hitting beats, a nostalgic stance, and cold punch lines and the album is one of his best, with the space disco and surprising "Stars" plus the stern-and-sure title track offering great examples of the artist's strengths."

== Track listing ==
The Keynote Speaker
No.	Title	Writer(s)	Producer(s)	Length
1.	"Vortex Of My Mind (Skit)" (featuring Vivian Scarlett)	Lamont Jody Hawkins		0:33
2.	"Keynote Speaker"	Hawkins; James Leigh	Leaf Dog	2:03
3.	"Heads Up" (featuring Jackpot Scotty Wotty & GZA)	Hawkins; Samuel Regis; Gary Eldridge Grice; Craig Anthony Bullock	DJ Homicide	2:30
4.	"Inferno (Skit)"	Hawkins		0:09
5.	"Fire" (featuring Jackpot Scotty Wotty & Method Man)	Hawkins; Regis; Clifford Smith, Jr.; Steve Reaves	Steve Reaves	3:16
6.	"Fame" (featuring Styles P)	Hawkins; David Styles; Leigh	Leaf Dog	4:11
7.	"Skyscraper"	Hawkins; Bullock; Jose Reynoso Jr.	DJ Homicide; Jose Reynoso Jr.	2:12
8.	"Heavyweight"	Hawkins; Teddy Powell	Teddy Powell	2:28
9.	"Colossal Cosmos (Skit)" (featuring Vivian Scarlett)	Hawkins		0:29
10.	"Stars"	Hawkins; Bullock; Reynoso Jr.	DJ Homicide; Reynoso Jr.	2:29
11.	"Golden Arms"	Hawkins; Jay Serbe; Reynoso Jr.	Jay Serbe; Reynoso Jr.	3:01
12.	"Room Keeps Spinning"	Hawkins; Robert Fitzgerald Diggs	RZA	3:48
13.	"Zilla"	Hawkins; Bullock	DJ Homicide	2:49
14.	"Get Mine"	Hawkins; Diggs	RZA	2:38
15.	"Mt. Everest" (featuring Inspectah Deck & Elzhi)	Hawkins; Jason Richard Hunter; Jason Powers; Franck Dias	Blasta Beatz	3:31
16.	"Transform"	Hawkins; Bullock	DJ Homicide	3:12
17.	"Journey" (featuring Kool Keith)	Hawkins; Keith Matthew Thornton; Teddy Powell	Teddy Powell	3:35
18.	"Be Right There" (Bonus)	Hawkins; Diggs	RZA	2:41
19.	"Days of Glory" (Bonus)	Hawkins; Reaves	Steve Reaves	2:58
Total length:				48:33

== Charts ==
Chart (2013)	Peak position
US Top R&B/Hip-Hop Albums (Billboard)	57
