= Venom (U-God album) =

Studio album by U-God
- Released: March 30, 2018
- Genre: Hip-hop
- Length: 41:47
- Label: Babygrande
- Producers: Jose Reynoso; DJ Homicide; DJ Green Lantern; ILL TAL; Large Professor; Lord Finesse; Powers Pleasant; The Bossmen

U-God chronology
The Keynote Speaker (2013)	Venom (2018)

Wu-Tang Clan solo chronology
Loyalty Is Royalty (2017)	Venom (2018)	Ear Candy (2018)

Venom is the fifth studio album by American rapper and Wu-Tang Clan member U-God released on March 30, 2018 via Babygrande Records.

== Background ==
The album was produced by several hip-hop producers, including DJ Green Lantern, DJ Homicide, Large Professor and Lord Finesse among others, and also features guest appearances from Inspectah Deck, Method Man, Raekwon, Scotty Wotty and Nomdiq.

Along with the album, U-God released his autobiographical book entitled Raw: My Journey Into The Wu-Tang in which he talks about his early childhood until his music career.

== Track listing ==
Venom track listing
No.	Title	Writer(s)	Producer(s)	Length
1.	"Exordium"	Lamont Jody Hawkins; Robert Andrezzi	ILL TAL	1:42
2.	"Unstoppable"	Hawkins; Powers Pleasant	Powers Pleasant	2:11
3.	"Epicenter" (featuring Inspectah Deck, Raekwon and Jackpot Scotty Wotty)	Hawkins; Jason Richard Hunter; Corey Woods; Samuel Regis; James Christopher D'Agostino	DJ Green Lantern	3:51
4.	"Bit Da Dust"	Hawkins; Jose Reynoso; Anthony Mercado	Jose Reynoso; DJ Homicide	2:38
5.	"Elegance" (featuring Nomadiq)	Hawkins; J. D'Agostino	DJ Green Lantern	3:34
6.	"Climate"	Hawkins; Reynoso	Jose Reynoso	3:18
7.	"Venom"	Hawkins; Reynoso; Mercado	Jose Reynoso; DJ Homicide	2:55
8.	"Felon"	Hawkins; William Paul Mitchell	Large Professor	2:13
9.	"Legacy"	Hawkins; Reynoso; Mercado	Jose Reynoso; DJ Homicide	3:35
10.	"Whole World Watchin'"	Hawkins; Robert Hall Jr.; Davel McKenzie; Kellen Ford	Lord Finesse; Davel McKenzie; K Ford	3:07
11.	"XXX" (featuring Method Man)	Hawkins; Clifford Smith, Jr.; Mercado	DJ Homicide	3:50
12.	"Jackpot" (performed by Jackpot Scotty Wotty)	Regie; Reynoso; Mercado	Jose Reynoso; DJ Homicide	2:37
13.	"Wisdom"	Hawkins; Reynoso	Jose Reynoso	3:04
14.	"Venom" (DJ Green Lantern Remix)	Hawkins; Reynoso; Mercado	DJ Green Lantern	3:12
Total length:				41:47
