= Soul Temple Records =

- Parent company: Stax Records
- Founded: 2012
- Founder: RZA; Bob Perry
- Distributor: RED Distribution
- Genre: Hip hop
- Country of origin: U.S.
- Location: New York City
- Official website: www.soultemplemusic.bandcamp.com

Soul Temple Records is an American record label founded in 2012 by hip hop recording artist RZA and Bob Perry after the release of the RZA directed The Man with the Iron Fists. The label's first release was that album's soundtrack. The label has since released studio albums by Wu-Tang Clan members Ghostface Killah and U-God. All albums released on the label are executive produced by RZA.

== History ==
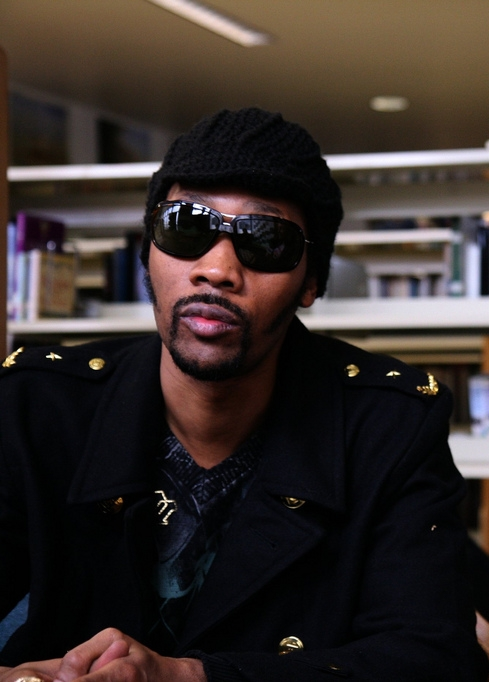
Wu-Tang Clan member RZA founded Soul Temple in 2012.

On August 28, 2012, leading up to the release of RZA's directorial debut The Man with the Iron Fist, he announced the founding of a new record label named Soul Temple Records. He explained the goal of the label being; the label "will release records from independent minded artists from a variety of genres, from the creative community." The labels first release would be revealed to be The Man With the Iron Fists OST. The album featured appearances from Kanye West, Wu-Tang Clan, Pusha T, M.O.P., Freddie Gibbs, Wiz Khalifa, Kool G. Rap, Flatbush Zombies, Corrine Bailey Rae, Talib Kweli, and The Black Keys among others. RZA said Soul Temple had been an idea he had for years, and it was inspired by his relationship with Isaac Hayes. By September 2012, Ghostface Killah announced he would be releasing an album through Soul Temple Records titled, Twelve Reasons to Die on November 20, however it would be pushed back to April 2013 to not compete with The Man with the Iron Fists soundtrack.

On March 19, 2013, RZA released The RZA Presents Shaolin Soul Selection: Vol 1 a compilation album compiled from the Stax Records archive. Twelve Reasons to Die would be released on April 16, 2013, and debut at number 27 on the Billboard 200 selling 15,000 copies in its first week of sale. In June 2013, U-God would sign onto Soul Temple to release his fourth studio album, the RZA produced The Keynote Speaker. It would receive its release on July 23, 2013, to minor commercial performance and mixed critical reception. U-God would criticize Soul Temple following its release, for him feeling they did not promote or release his record correctly. Soul Temple was also meant to release Souls of Mischief's sixth studio album There Is Only Now in 2013.

Following an outrage due to orders not being processed correctly, and customers not receiving their products, RZA said that it was due to bad staffing positions at the label, which resulted in business not running correctly.

This "statement" made on "Twitter" in '2013/2014' was what RZA was forced to "finally" publicly announce due to the multiple Non Disclosure Contracts Bob Perry forced to be signed before the infinite dismissal by anyone too closely involved aka "Staffed/Working" to attempt to fix multiple layers of errors, working ethically to correct the unethical failing system Bob Perry had already created.

Unfortunately; those whom were present to witness it all behind closed doors while RZA was abroad touring and filming-were legally silenced by Bob Perry himself. There were constant daily enactments of battling for the integrity of RZA's reputation (in business as well as an artist), the loyalty with trust of global fans and above all- the roster of artists projects already launched, mid launching, soon to be launched. The very strategically composed NDC's signed by anyone considered a "liability" due to their experience and depths of knowledge being so closely involved; prevented the voicing or submission of evidence obtained by the meticulous observations of outrageous truths hidden by unethical business strategies used to prevent exposing the extensive realities of countless deceitful actions that RZA (most of all) was not a part of, never truly aware of and in fact remains completely unaware of to this present day and time; still- in 2023. He also revealed that Bob Perry had been removed from the mail-order department, and demoted from president of the label to VP of the A&R department. On December 24, 2013, the label released "Destiny Bends" a tribute song for deceased actor Paul Walker by RZA for digital download.

== Discography ==
Artist	Album	Details
Various artists	The Man With the Iron Fists OST	Released: October 22, 2012; Chart positions: Number 31 on the Billboard 200
RZA	The RZA Presents Shaolin Soul Selection: Vol 1	Released: March 19, 2013; Archive compilation album
Ghostface Killah	Twelve Reasons to Die	Released: April 16, 2013; Chart position: Number 27 on the Billboard 200
U-God	The Keynote Speaker	Released: July 23, 2013; Chart positions: Number 57 on U.S. Billboard Top R&B/Hip-Hop Albums
Ghostface Killah	Twelve Reasons to Die: The Brown Tape	Released: July 23, 2013; Chart position:
