= Cappadonna =

American rapper (born 1968)

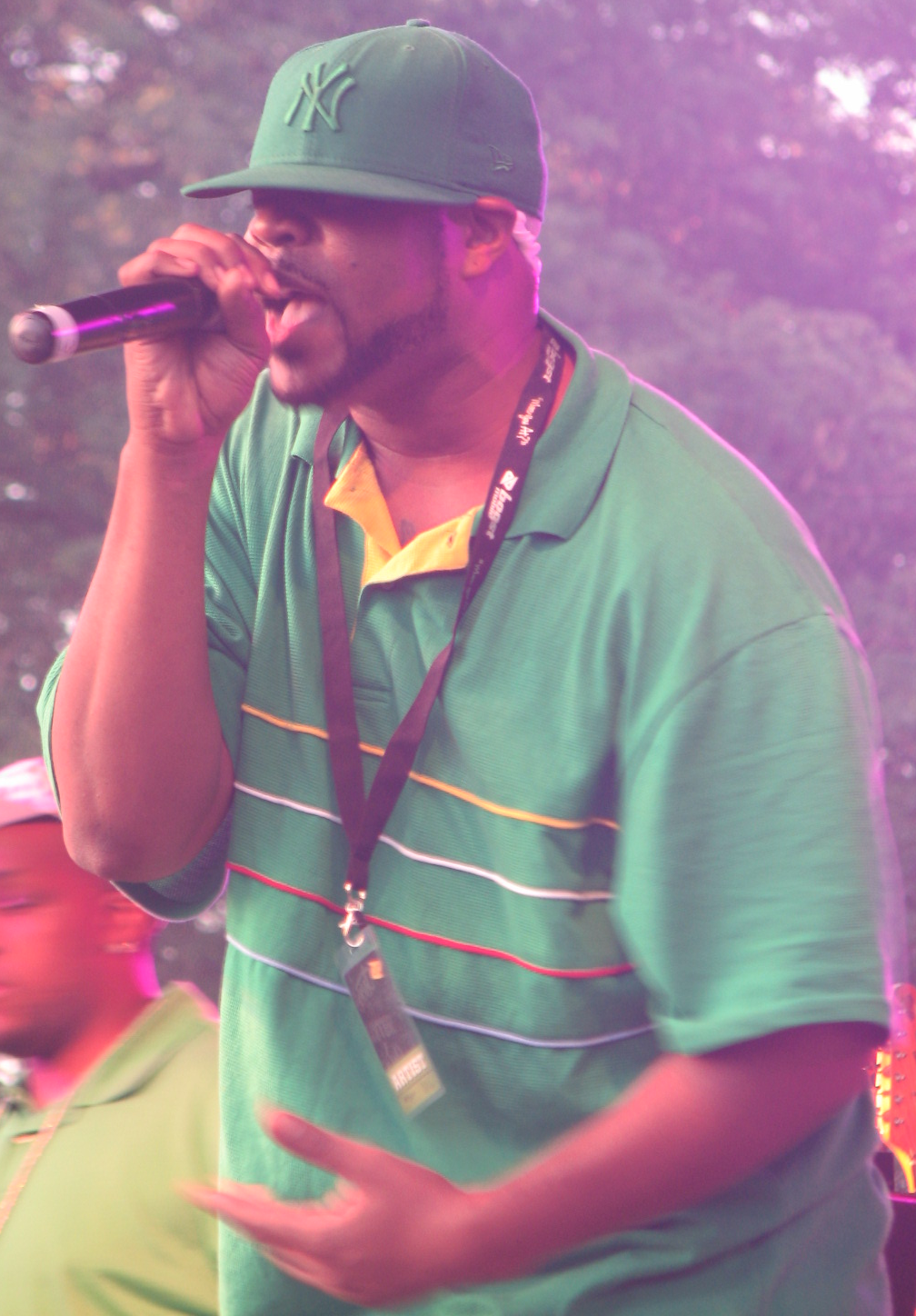
- Cappadonna performing at the Pitchfork Music Festival in Chicago in 2007

Background information
- Also known as: Cappachino
- Born: Darryl Hill; September 18, 1968 (age 58); Brooklyn, New York City, U.S.
- Origin: Staten Island, New York City, U.S.
- Genre: East Coast hip-hop
- Occupation: Rapper
- Years active: 1995–present
- Label: RBC
- Member of: Wu-Tang Clan; Theodore Unit

Darryl Hill (born September 18, 1968), better known by his stage name Cappadonna, is an American rapper. He is a member of the hip-hop group Wu-Tang Clan and is a member of the hip-hop group Theodore Unit together with Ghostface Killah.

== Career ==
Cappadonna (also known as Cappachino) grew up in the same community with his future Wu-Tang Clan peers, and mentored U-God. However, Cappadonna went to prison and was replaced in the group by Method Man.

Cappadonna made his recording debut as an affiliate of the Wu-Tang Clan on Raekwon's 1995 single "Ice Cream" on Only Built 4 Cuban Linx.... He was also a guest star, along with Raekwon, on Ghostface Killah's solo debut album, Ironman. He made his first appearance on a Wu-Tang Clan album in 1997 on Wu-Tang Forever on the single "Triumph". Following his appearance on Forever, he contributed significantly to the group's third studio album, The W, at which point his appearances were no longer marked with "Featuring Cappadonna", as they had been on Forever. After a falling-out with RZA the next year over royalties, he did not appear at all on the group's subsequent album Iron Flag. He reunited with the group for their concert at 2004's Rock the Bells, and appeared on 2007 release 8 Diagrams.

Cappadonna's status as a Wu-Tang member or as a featured artist has varied throughout the years, while long referred to by both the group and fans as the "Unofficial Tenth Member". Also, while his vocals on 8 Diagrams were not marked with "Feat. Cappadonna", much like The W, he does not appear on the front cover with the original eight living members, and is not featured in the album's booklet with a picture, although he is included in the group's shout-outs sections. In a press conference held October 2, 2014, at Warner Studios for the upcoming release of the Wu-Tang Clan's A Better Tomorrow album, RZA clarified any misunderstanding of Cappadonna's affiliation with Wu-Tang Clan, stating that Cappadonna has been an official member of Wu-Tang Clan since 8 Diagrams.

Cappadonna's first solo effort was 1998's The Pillage which debuted and peaked at number 3 on the charts and certified Gold. His follow-up – 2001's The Yin and The Yang – debuted at number 51 on the charts. Staying vigilant in his support of The Clan, he then featured on over 25 releases including classics from Raekwon, Method Man and Ghostface.

Known for his colorful wardrobe, he frequently refers to fashion designers and his large collection of boutique clothing in his raps.

In 2019 Cappadonna was featured in Wu-Tang Clan: Of Mics and Men, a documentary in honor of the 25th anniversary of Wu-Tang Clan's debut album, Enter the Wu-Tang (36 Chambers).

Cappadonna once mentioned in a podcast that his name is an acronym for "Consider All Poor People Acceptable Don't Oppress Nor Neglect Anyone.".

Cappadonna was a former member of the Five-Percent Nation, until he & RZA accompanied childhood friend & president of 36 Chambers Tareef Michael to Mecca in January 2024 and converted to Islam in the Masjid al-Haram.

== Discography ==
=== Albums ===
Album name	Release date	Certifications
The Pillage	March 24, 1998	RIAA: Gold
The Yin and the Yang	April 3, 2001	
The Struggle	October 7, 2003	
The Cappatilize Project	July 22, 2008	
Slang Prostitution	January 27, 2009	
The Pilgrimage	November 15, 2011	
Eyrth, Wynd and Fyre	February 26, 2013	
Hook Off	June 17, 2014	
The Pillage 2	November 27, 2015	
Ear Candy	July 20, 2018	
Black Is Beautiful	June 26, 2020	
Show Me The Money	August 26, 2020	
Black Tarrzann	March 31, 2021	
Slow Motion	March 11, 2022	
Da Illage	July 4, 2022	
The Man with the Iron Darts	March 28, 2024	
Godly, Wealthy & Beautiful	April 17, 2025	
Solar Eclipse	September 18, 2025	

=== Collaboration albums ===
Album name	Release Date
Ironman (Ghostface Killah album)	1996
Iron Fist Pillage (Soundtrack)	2001
718 (with Theodore Unit)	2004
Wu South Vl. 1 (with Ratched Rush)	2005
Wu South Vl. 2 (with Ratched Rush)	2009
The 2nd Coming (with Bronze Nazareth, Canibus, M-Eighty, Nino Grave & Planet Asia, as The Almighty)	2013
Hip Hop Mixtape Hosted by DJ Intrigue (prod. by Pete Rock)	2017
AlCappaChemist Mixtape Hosted by DJ Intrigue (prod. by Alchemist)	2021
3rd Chamber Grail Bars (prod. by Stu Bangas)	2022
African Killa Beez (prod. by Shaka Amazulu The 7th)	2023

=== Singles and EPs ===
- 1996 "Taking Drastic Measures"
- 1997 "Tragedy"
- 1998 "Slang Editorial"
- 1998 "Run"
- 1999 "Black Boy"
- 2001 "Super Model"
- 2007 "Don't Turn Around"
- 2009 "Somebody's Got To Go"
- 2011 "Cuban Link Kings"

=== Guest appearances ===
- 1995 "Ice Cream"; "Ice Water" (Only Built 4 Cuban Linx...)
- 1996 "If It's Alright with You" (The Great White Hype)
- 1996 "Winter Warz" (Don't Be a Menace to South Central While Drinking Your Juice in the Hood & Ironman)
- 1996 "Wu-Wear: The Garment Renaissance" (High School High)
- 1996 "Iron Maiden"; "Winter Warz"; "Fish"; "Camay"; "Daytona 500" (Ironman)
- 1997 "For Heavenz' Sake"; "Maria"; "Triumph"; "Little Ghetto Boy"; "Heaterz" (Wu-Tang Forever)
- 1998 "Strange Fruit" (Soul Survivor)
- 1998 "Sweet Love" (Tical 2000: Judgement Day)
- 1998 "'97 Mentality" (The Swarm)
- 1998 I Can See" (Slam)
- 1998 "Run" (Bulworth)
- 1999 "'96 Recreation" (Wu-Chronicles)
- 2000 "Buck 50"; "Wu-Banga 101" (Supreme Clientele)
- 2000 "One Four Love Part 2" (Hip Hop for Respect EP)
- 2006 "9 Milli Bros" (Fishscale)
- 2018 "Wu Tang Forever" (YSIV)
