= GZA discography =

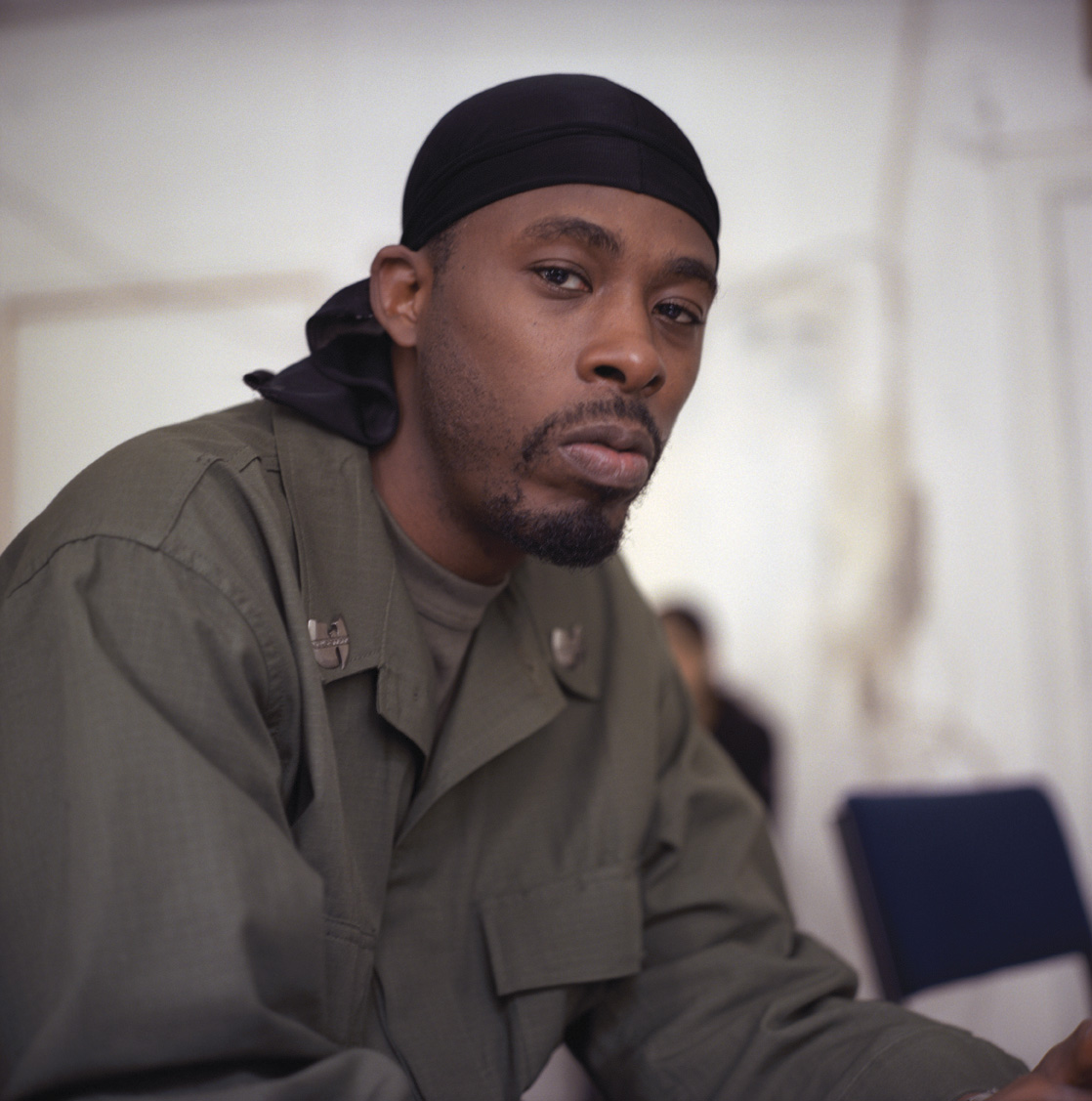
- Studio albums: 5
- Live albums: 2
- Singles: 13

This is the discography of American rapper GZA.

== Albums ==
=== Studio albums ===
List of studio albums, with selected chart positions, sales figures and certifications
Year	Title	Peak chart positions						Certifications
Year	Title	US	US R&B	US Rap	AUS	CAN	UK	Certifications
1991	Words from the Genius: Released: February 19, 1991; Label: Cold Chillin'/Reprise/Warner Bros. Records	—	—	*	—	—	—	
1995	Liquid Swords: Released: November 7, 1995; Label: Geffen/MCA Records	9	2	*	—	20	73	RIAA: Platinum; BPI: Gold
1999	Beneath the Surface: Released: June 29, 1999; Label: MCA Records	9	1	*	98	13	64	RIAA: Gold
2002	Legend of the Liquid Sword: Released: December 10, 2002; Label: MCA/Universal Records	75	21	*	—	—	—	
2008	Pro Tools: Released: August 19, 2008; Label: Babygrande Records	52	13	9	—	—	—	
TBA	Dark Matter: Released: TBA; Label: TBA				—	—	—	

=== Collaboration albums ===
List of collaboration albums, with selected chart positions
Year	Title	Peak chart positions						Certifications
Year	Title	US	US R&B	US Rap	AUS	CAN	UK	Certifications
2005	GrandMasters (with DJ Muggs): Released: October 25, 2005; Label: Angeles Records	180	69	—	—	—	—	

== Singles ==
Year	Title	Peak chart positions			Album
Year	Title	US	US R&B	US Rap	Album
1991	"Come Do Me"	—	86	19	Words from the Genius
1991	"Words from a Genius"	—	—	—	Words from the Genius
1991	"Who's Your Rhymin' Hero"	—	—	—	Words from the Genius
1994	"Pass the Bone"	—	—	—	Words from the Genius
1994	"I Gotcha Back"	—	—	29	Liquid Swords
1995	"Liquid Swords"	48	33	3	Liquid Swords
1995	"Cold World" (feat. Inspectah Deck)	97	57	8	Liquid Swords
1996	"Shadowboxin'" (feat. Method Man)	67	41	10	Liquid Swords
1996	"4th Chamber" (feat. RZA, Ghostface Killah and Killah Priest)	—	—	—	Liquid Swords
1999	"Crash Your Crew" (feat. Ol' Dirty Bastard)	—	—	—	Beneath the Surface
1999	"Breaker, Breaker"	—	80	16	Beneath the Surface
2002	"Knock, Knock" (feat. Ghostface Killah)	—	—	—	Legend of the Liquid Sword
2002	"Fame"	—	—	19	Legend of the Liquid Sword
2005	"General Principles" (with DJ Muggs)	—	—	—	GrandMasters

== Guest appearances ==
Year	Song	Artist(s)	Album
1995	"Damage"	Ol' Dirty Bastard	Return to the 36 Chambers: The Dirty Version
1995	"Guillotine (Swordz)"	Raekwon, Ghostface Killah, Inspectah Deck	Only Built 4 Cuban Linx...
1997	"Third World"	DJ Muggs, RZA	Soul Assassins
1998	"Cross My Heart"	Killah Priest, Inspectah Deck	Heavy Mental / Caught Up (soundtrack)
1998	"One More to Go (The Earthquake)"	Deadly Venoms, Cappadonna, Inspectah Deck, Method Man, & Streetlife	Antidote
2000	"Wu Banga 101"	Ghostface Killah, Raekwon, Cappadonna, Masta Killa	Supreme Clientele
2000	"Bigacts Littleacts"	Afu-Ra	Body of the Life Force
2000	"When the Fat Lady Sings"	DJ Muggs	Soul Assassins II
2001	"Do U"	RZA, Prodigial Sun	Digital Bullet
2004	"On the Eve of War"	Jedi Mind Tricks	Legacy of Blood
2004	"Silverbacks"	Masta Killa, Inspectah Deck	No Said Date
2004	"Head Rush"	Pete Rock	Soul Survivor II
2005	"Pool of Blood"	Jus Allah	All Fates Have Changed
2005	"Lyrical Swords"	Ras Kass	Wu-Tang Meets the Indie Culture
2005	"Verses"	Ras Kass, La the Darkman	Wu-Tang Meets the Indie Culture
2005	"Just the Thought"	Prefuse 73, Masta KIlla	Surrounded By Silence
2006	"Street Corner"	Masta Killa, Inspectah Deck	Made in Brooklyn
2007	"Cameo Afro"	Big Daddy Kane, Suga Bang Bang	Afro Samurai: The Album
2008	"Triple Threat"	DJ Muggs, Planet Asia	Pain Language
2009	"Stomp da Roach"	U-God, Scotty Wotty	Dopium
2009	"Birds of a Feather"	Rocky	Saskamodie
2009	"House of Flying Daggers"	Raekwon, Ghostface Killah, Inspectah Deck, Method Man	Only Built 4 Cuban Linx...Pt.II
2009	"We Will Rob You"	Raekwon, Masta Killa, Slick Rick	Only Built 4 Cuban Linx...Pt.II
2010	"Assed Out"	Method Man	Pollen: The Swarm
2010	"Purified Thoughts"	Ghostface Killah, Killah Priest	Apollo Kids
2010	"New York Ginseng"	Folk & Stress	New York Ginseng
2011	"Wu Crime"	Raekwon, Killah Priest	Shaolin vs. Wu-Tang
2012	"Drivin' Round"	Wu Block, Masta Killa, Sheek Louch, Erykah Badu	Wu Block
2013	"Heads Up"	U-God, Scotty Wotty	The Keynote Speaker
2015	"When Gods Go Mad"	Czarface	Every Hero Needs a Villain
2015	"The Mexican"	Tom Morello	Unaffiliated single
2016	"3rd Day"	Hermetic Order, Killah Priest	Siren Song
2017	"Tiger and the Mantice"	Masta Killa, Inspectah Deck	Loyalty Is Royalty
2018	"In the Morning"	Joey Purp	Quarterthing
2018	"Lead Poisoning"	Tom Morello, RZA, Herobust	The Atlas Underground
2019	"Ibithaj"	Rapsody, D'Angelo	Eve
2019	"One Rhyme"	Masta Killa	Of Mics and Men (soundtrack)
2023	"I Told Them"	Burna Boy	I Told Them...
2025	"The Trial"	Ghostface Killah, Raekwon, Reek the Villain, Method Man	Supreme Clientele 2

== Music videos ==
Year	Album	Title	Director	Other featured artist
1994	Liquid Swords	I Gotcha Back	n/c	
1995	Liquid Swords	Liquid Swords	n/c	RZA
1995	Liquid Swords	Cold World	n/c	Inspectah Deck
1995	Liquid Swords	Shadowboxin'/4th Chamber	n/c	Method Man, RZA, Ghostface Killah, Killah Priest
1997	Soul Assassins	Third World	n/c	RZA
1999	Beneath the Surface	Breaker, Breaker	n/c	
1999	Beneath the Surface	Crash Your Crew	n/c	Ol' Dirty Bastard
2000	Soul Assassins II	When the Fat Lady Sings	n/c	
2002	Legend of the Liquid Sword	Knock, Knock	n/c	Ghostface Killah
2005	Grand Masters	General Principles	n/c	DJ Muggs
2019	Eve	Ibithaj	n/c	Rapsody, D'Angelo
