= Shaolin's Finest =

Compilation album by Ghostface Killah
- Released: April 1, 2003
- Recorded: 1996–2001
- Genre: Hip hop
- Length: 47:00
- Label: Epic

Ghostface Killah chronology
Bulletproof Wallets (2001)	Shaolin's Finest (2003)	718 (2004)

Professional ratings
Review scores
Source	Rating
AllMusic	4.5/5 stars
Spin	(6/10)

Shaolin's Finest is a compilation album by American rapper Ghostface Killah, featuring singles from the albums Ironman, Supreme Clientele, and Bulletproof Wallets. It was done to fulfill Ghostface's four-album contract with Epic Records.

== Track listing ==
No.	Title	Length
1.	"Daytona 500" (from Ironman, 1996)	4:40
2.	"Poisonous Darts" (from Ironman, 1996)	2:15
3.	"Camay" (from Ironman, 1996)	4:34
4.	"All That I Got Is You" (from Ironman, 1996)	3:25
5.	"Child's Play**" (from Supreme Clientele, 2000)	3:34
6.	"One" (from Supreme Clientele, 2000)	3:45
7.	"Malcolm" (from Supreme Clientele, 2000)	4:14
8.	"Apollo Kids" (from Supreme Clientele, 2000)	4:54
9.	"Cherchez La Ghost" (from Supreme Clientele, 2000)	3:11
10.	"Ghost Showers" (from Bulletproof Wallets, 2001)	4:11
11.	"Never Be the Same Again" (from Bulletproof Wallets, 2001)	4:26
12.	"Strawberry" (from Bulletproof Wallets, 2001)	3:05
Total length:		47:00
