= NYOIL =

American rapper

- Also known as: New York Oil; Kool Kim (UMC era); Fly Guy Kool Kim (UMC era)
- Born: Kim Sharpton; April 29, 1971 (age 55); Staten Island, New York City, U.s.
- Genres: Political hip hop, alternative hip hop
- Occupations: Rapper, social activist, motivational speaker
- Instrument: Vocals
- Years active: 1991–present
- Labels: Petroleum Empire; BabyGrande; Masta Mix Records

NYOIL (pronounced N-Y Oil) (born April 29, 1971) is an American emcee from Staten Island, New York City. His name was formerly an acronym for "New York's Original International Lover". He began rapping at the age of twelve, and in 1988 he paired up with fellow Staten Island rapper Haas G to form the hip-hop duo the U.M.C.'s.

In 1991, as Kool Kim, the pair released the first of two albums as the group the U.M.C.'s (Undisputed Masters of Charisma), titled Fruits of Nature. The album peaked at #36 on Billboard's Hot 100 list, but the singles "Blue Cheese" and "One to Grow On" achieved wider success, reaching #1 and #2 on Billboard's Hot Rap Single chart. Their second studio album Unleashed failed to achieve as much critical or commercial success as their first and the pair parted ways soon after.

It was at this time that Kool Kim changed his stage name to NYOIL and began working on solo projects of his own. In December 2006, around the same time that Nas released his critically acclaimed album Hip Hop Is Dead, NYOIL put a video up on MySpace and YouTube for his song "Y'All Should All Get Lynched", which was produced by DJ Slice of The Cr8Kickers. The track calls for the lynching of a number of major-label rappers, and the video features pictures of current rap stars such as 50 Cent and Three 6 Mafia coupled with images of lynchings, slavery, and minstrelsy. The video was banned from YouTube after less than 48 hours, and attracted a large amount of media attention for its controversial content. NYOIL did not give much biographical detail or offer many explanations, refusing even to be photographed without his sunglasses on.

NYOIL released his solo debut full-length album, HoodTREASON, on June 26, 2007. Singles from the album include "Y'All Should All Get Lynched", "Purrrfect Beat", and "Hip Hop Ya Don't Stop". HoodTREASON was reissued by Babygrande Records in 2008. NYOIL has continued to release music and has received acclaim for his live shows.

== Albums ==
- HoodTREASON (The Warm Up Album) (2007)
- HoodTREASON double CD 2008
- 9 Wonders (NYOIL verses 9th Wonder (2008)
