= Apollo Kids =

Apollo Kids may refer to:

- "Apollo Kids" (song), a 1999 song by Ghostface Killah from Supreme Clientele
- Apollo Kids (album), a 2010 album by Ghostface Killah
