= Shaolin vs Lama =

1983 Hong Kong film by Lee Tso-Nam

Shaolin vs Lama (Chinese: 少林鬥喇嘛) is a kung fu film starring Alexander Lo.

== Plot ==
Lo Jui plays Sun Yi Ting, a Kung Fu fanatic in search of a teacher. After five years of challenging masters but never being beaten he runs into Hsu Shi (William Yen), a young Shaolin monk who stole money from a gambling match in order to acquire meat and wine for his master, who later discovers Yu Ting inside the Buddhist temple. Although Hsu's master (often referred to as Grandmaster) defeats Yu with ease he refuses to take him on as a student. Yu then resorts to trickery to try to learn techniques from the aged monk, Using the techniques the master uses against himself. Eventually these antics come to the attention of the senior abbot who expels Yu Ting from the temple altogether.

Yu is only allowed back into the temple after he rescues a girl escaping from the dreaded Sky hawk clan. The head of the gang is a chief Lama, Yao Feng Lin, a sworn enemy of Shaolin who, twelve years ago, stole one of temple's most treasured martial arts manuals: the I ching manual. Hsu Shi's master eventually agrees to take Yu Ting on as a student but lessons are cut short when the Lama turns up and kills the master. Yu now swears revenge but before he can leave Shaolin he has to learn the 'Buddha Finger' technique, requested by his master to learn in order to defeat the Lama Chief.

== Cast ==
- Lo Jui – Sun Yi Ting

Sun Yi Ting is a good man, but can sometimes show up as a bully or infidel, especially with Hsu Shi. Nonetheless, he is considerate and means no harm.

- Chang Shan – Yao Feng Lin

Yao Feng Lin is a vile man, capable of destruction. He kills off several characters - including Yan Zu and Hsu Shi's master - as well as severely injuring the head abbot. He is the perfect leader for the local crime ring, the Sky hawk clan.

- William Yen – Hsu Shi

Hsu Shi is a timid character. He is very agile, but lacks in his Kung Fu. He is rather loyal to Sun Yu Ting, despite his oppressive nature.

== Pop culture ==
Two members of the Wu-Tang Clan, GZA and Raekwon, have featured dialogue from the English dubbed version of the movie. The samples appeared on GZA's 1995 album Liquid Swords, and Raekwon's "Guillotine (Swordz)" from Only Built 4 Cuban Linx… and "House of Flying Daggers", "Broken Safety", and "We Will Rob You" from Only Built 4 Cuban Linx… Pt. II.

Dialogue from the film also features at certain points in Chris Rock's Roll With the New.

Dialogue from the film is sampled in the Depth Charge song Shaolin Buddha Finger from the album 9 Deadly Venoms. The track is named after the technique Sun Yu Ting uses to defeat Yao Feng Lin.
