= I Gotcha' Back =

1994 single by GZA

Single by GZA

from the album "Fresh" Music Inspired by the Film and Liquid Swords
- Released: August 1994
- Genre: Hip-hop
- Length: 3:44
- Label: Geffen
- Songwriters: Robert Diggs, Gary Grice
- Producer: Prince Rakeem "The RZA"

GZA singles chronology
"I Gotcha' Back" (1994)	"Liquid Swords" (1995)

Music video
- "I Gotcha' Back" on YouTube

"I Gotcha' Back" is a song by American rapper and Wu-Tang Clan member GZA. It was originally released as a single in August 1994 as part of the soundtrack to the film Fresh and later included on his second studio album Liquid Swords with the apostrophe dropped from the title.

== Background and composition ==
GZA contributed "I Gotcha' Back" to the soundtrack of the 1994 crime drama Fresh, which also included a remix of the Wu-Tang Clan song "Can It Be All So Simple" as well as the debut single from fellow Clan member Raekwon, "Heaven & Hell". Like "Heaven & Hell" for Raekwon, "I Gotcha' Back" would end up serving as the first single from GZA's 1995 album, Liquid Swords. In a 2014 interview with Wax Poetics, GZA explained the origin of the song:

This was a short rhyme I wrote for one of my nephews. When I said, 'My lifestyle so far from well, could've wrote a book called Age Twelve and Going Through Hell.' It's for my nephew who was twelve at the time, and whose father, my brother, had been locked up since '88. So he wasn't around for my nephew when times were rough, so I wanted to up my nephew a bit with this track.

"I Gotcha' Back" "stood as an underground staple a year before Liquid Swords was released", according to XXL magazine.

== Music video ==
The video for "I Gotcha' Back" was directed by GZA himself. It stars two of GZA's nephews walking around New York City, both of whom would end up incarcerated as of 2014, leading to GZA saying the song had developed a "sad irony" for him. Steve "Flash" Juon of Rapreviews.com ranked "I Gotcha' Back" as the 2nd best GZA video in his 2022 ranking.

== Reception ==
"I Gotcha' Back" has received positive reception from critics over the years. B.J. Steiner of XXL magazine referred to the song as an "[i]ntense and gritty epic", while Stereo Williams of Okayplayer said it "recaptures the knockaround energy of Wu's classic 'Protect Ya Neck'". Adult Swim's adult animated sitcom The Boondocks made reference to the track in the season one episode "A Date with the Health Inspector".

== Track listing ==
No.	Title	Length
1.	"I Gotcha' Back" (Album Version)	3:44
2.	"I Gotcha' Back" (Radio Edit)	3:18
3.	"I Gotcha' Back" (Instrumental)	3:38
