= Fruits of Nature =

1991 studio album by the UMC's

Studio album by the UMC's
- Released: October 15, 1991
- Recorded: 1990–1991
- Studios: Such-A-Sound (Brooklyn, New York City)
- Genre: Hip hop
- Length: 51:52
- Labels: Wild Pitch; EMI
- Producers: Chip Taylor; Haas G; RNS; Shlomo Sonnenfeld

The UMC's chronology
| Fruits of Nature (1991) | Unleashed (1994) |

Singles from Fruits of Nature
- 1. "Blue Cheese" Released: 1991; 2. "One to Grow On" Released: 1992

Fruits of Nature is the debut studio album by the American hip hop group the UMC's. It was released in October 15, 1991, via Wild Pitch Records. The recording sessions took place at Such-A-Sound Studio in Brooklyn. The album was produced by member Haas G, RNS, Shlomo Sonnenfeld, and Chip Taylor. The album spawned two singles: "Blue Cheese" and "One to Grow On".

== Critical reception ==
Professional ratings
Review scores
| Source | Rating |
|---|---|
| AllMusic | 3/5 stars |
| The Source | 3.5/5 stars |

The Christian Science Monitor noted that "the UMC's fit into the East Coast trend toward clever rhyming with a nod toward black musical tradition, while delivering messages of self-reliance, individuality, friendship, education, and respect between the sexes."

== Track listing ==
All tracks are written by Carlos Evans and Kim Sharpton.

| No. | Title | Producer(s) | Length |
|---|---|---|---|
| 1. | "One to Grow On" | Haas G; RNS | 3:34 |
| 2. | "Kraftworks" | Haas G; RNS; Shlomo Sonnenfeld | 3:34 |
| 3. | "Morals" | Haas G; RNS | 3:33 |
| 4. | "Blue Cheese" | Haas G; RNS | 3:31 |
| 5. | "Swing It to the Area" | Haas G; RNS | 3:17 |
| 6. | "Never Never Land" (featuring Berkeley Carroll Summer Choir) | Haas G; RNS; Chip Taylor | 4:14 |
| 7. | "You Got My Back" | Haas G; RNS | 4:03 |
| 8. | "Jive Talk" | Haas G; RNS; Shlomo Sonnenfeld; Young Technique (co.) | 3:33 |
| 9. | "Feelings" (featuring Alton Sharpton and Tonya Wilcox) | Haas G; RNS | 4:04 |
| 10. | "Any Way the Wind Blows" | Haas G; RNS | 3:27 |
| 11. | "Pass It On" (featuring Kwazi and Prophet) | Haas G; RNS | 4:26 |
| 12. | "Woman Be Out" | Haas G; RNS | 3:31 |
| 13. | "Hey Here We Go" | Haas G; RNS | 3:26 |
| 14. | "It's Gonna Last" | Haas G; RNS | 3:55 |
| Total length: | | | 51:52 |

== Personnel ==
- Carlos "Haas G" Evans – songwriter, producer
- "Kool Kim" Sharpton – songwriter
- Berkeley Carroll Summer Choir – backing vocals (track 6)
- Alton Sharpton – backing vocals (track 9)
- Tonya Wilcox – backing vocals (track 9)
- Kwazi – vocals (track 11)
- Prophet – vocals (track 11)
- Richard Locker – cello
- D.J. Kid Magic – scratches
- Arby "RNS" Quinn – producer
- Shlomo Sonnenfeld – producer (tracks: 2, 8), engineering
- James Wesley "Chip Taylor" Voight – producer (track 6)
- Young Technique – co-producer (track 8)
- Carlton Batts – mastering
- Janette Beckman – photography

== Charts ==
| Chart (1992) | Peak position |
|---|---|
| US Heatseekers Albums (Billboard) | 36 |
| US Top R&B/Hip-Hop Albums (Billboard) | 32 |
