= Wu-Wear: The Garment Renaissance =

1996 single by RZA featuring Method Man and Cappadonna

Single by RZA featuring Method Man and Cappadonna

from the album High School High: The Soundtrack
- Released: July 30, 1996
- Genre: Hip-hop
- Length: 3:52
- Label: Big Beat
- Songwriters: Robert Diggs; Clifford Smith Jr.; Darryl Hill
- Producer: RZA

RZA singles chronology
"4th Chamber" (1996)	"Wu-Wear: The Garment Renaissance" (1996)	"Tragedy" (1997)

Method Man singles chronology
"Shadowboxin'" (1996)	"Wu-Wear: The Garment Renaissance" (1996)	"Hit 'Em High (The Monstars' Anthem)" (1996)

Cappadonna singles chronology
"Taking Drastic Measures" (1996)	"Wu-Wear: The Garment Renaissance" (1996)	"'97 Mentality" (1997)

Music video
- "Wu-Wear: The Garment Renaissance" on YouTube

"Wu-Wear: The Garment Renaissance" is a song by American rapper RZA featuring fellow Wu-Tang Clan members Method Man and Cappadonna. It was released on July 30, 1996 as the second single from the soundtrack to the film High School High (1996).

== Background ==
In an interview with Passion of the Weiss, entrepreneur, producer and Wu-Tang Clan associate Oliver "Power" Grant stated that Craig Kallman had called RZA, asking him to work on a song for the High School High soundtrack, and Grant "had just been on RZA's back about needing more marketing and more promotions." RZA told Grant he would be creating a song and video for him to promote. The result was "Wu-Wear: The Garment Renaissance". The video was shot with Mekhi Phifer.

== Charts ==
Chart (1996)	Peak position
US Billboard Hot 100	60
US Hot R&B/Hip-Hop Songs (Billboard)	40
US Hot Rap Songs (Billboard)	6
