= Ghost Showers =

Single by Ghostface Killah

from the album Bulletproof Wallets
- Released: November 22, 2001
- Genre: Hip hop
- Label: Epic; SME
- Songwriters: Stony Browder; Dennis Coles; August Darnell; Kenyatta Galbreith; Marcel Hall; Chris Liggio; Marlon Williams
- Producers: Chris Liggio; Tally Galbreth

Ghostface Killah singles chronology
| "Never Be the Same Again" (2001) | "Ghost Showers" (2001) | "Guerilla Hood" (2003) |

"Ghost Showers" is the second single from the album Bulletproof Wallets by Ghostface Killah.

The song was later added to his greatest hits album Shaolin's Finest.

The song is largely an interpolation of Dr. Buzzard's Original Savannah Band's single "Sunshower".

== Lyrical content ==
Despite an obvious attempt at a club hit, Ghost was praised for his strong lyrical content.

== Track listing ==
1. "Never Be the Same Again" (Album version)
2. "Ghost Showers" (Album version)
3. "Never Be the Same Again" (Radio edit)
4. "Ghost Showers" (Clean version)
5. "Ghost Showers" (Instrumental)

== Charts ==
| Chart (2002) | Peak Position |
|---|---|
| U.S. Billboard Hot R&B/Hip-Hop Songs | 15 |
| U.S. Billboard Hot Rap Tracks | 11 |
