= Cherchez La Ghost =

"Cherchez LaGhost"

Single by Ghostface Killah featuring U-God

from the album Supreme Clientele
- Released: February 28, 2000
- Studio: 36 Chambers Studio (New York, NY)
- Genre: Hip hop; R&B
- Length: 3:11
- Label: Razor Sharp; Epic
- Songwriter(s): Dennis Coles; Stony Browder; Thomas August Darnell Browder; Lawrence Parker
- Producer(s): Carlos Bess

Ghostface Killah singles chronology
"Apollo Kids" (1999)	"Cherchez LaGhost" (2000)	"Never Be the Same Again" (2001)

Music video
- "Cherchez LaGhost" on YouTube

"Cherchez La Ghost" is a song by American rapper Ghostface Killah featuring fellow Wu-Tang Clan member U-God and uncredited vocals from singer Madam Majestic. It was released in 2000 via Razor Sharp/Epic Records as the second single from GFK's second solo studio album Supreme Clientele. Recording sessions took place at 36 Chambers Studio in New York City. Production was handled by Carlos Bess, who used samples from "Greedy G" by Brentford All Stars and the 1976 song "Cherchez La Femme" by Dr. Buzzard's Original Savannah Band.

The single peaked at number 98 on the Billboard Hot 100, marking the rapper's first entry to the chart as a solo artist. An accompanying music video was directed by Little X.

The song was later added to his 2003 greatest hits album Shaolin's Finest.

== Track listing ==
Cassette and CD single
No.	Title	Length
1.	"Cherchez LaGhost" (Clean Version)	3:05
2.	"Cherchez LaGhost" (Instrumental)	3:09
3.	"Cherchez LaGhost" (LP Version)	3:10

12" vinyl
No.	Title	Producer(s)	Length
1.	"Cherchez LaGhost" (Clean Version)	Carlos Bess	3:05
2.	"Cherchez LaGhost" (Instrumental)	Carlos Bess	3:09
3.	"Cherchez LaGhost" (LP Version)	Carlos Bess	3:10
4.	"We Made It (Clean Version)" (featuring Superb)	Carlos "Six July" Broady	4:29
5.	"We Made It" (Instrumental)	Carlos "Six July" Broady	4:29
6.	"We Made It (LP Version)" (featuring Superb)	Carlos "Six July" Broady	4:37

== Charts ==
Chart (2000)	Peak position
US Billboard Hot 100	98
US Hot R&B/Hip-Hop Songs (Billboard)	42
US R&B/Hip-Hop Airplay (Billboard)	38
US Hot Rap Songs (Billboard)	3
