= Shadowboxin' =

Single by GZA featuring Method Man

Single by GZA featuring Method Man

from the album Liquid Swords
- A-side: "4th Chamber" (double A-side)
- Released: March 28, 1996
- Recorded: 1995
- Genre: Hip-hop
- Length: 3:29
- Label: Geffen
- Songwriters: Gary Grice, Clifford Smith, Robert Diggs
- Producer: RZA

GZA singles chronology
"Cold World" (1995)	"Shadowboxin'" / "4th Chamber" (1996)	"Crash Your Crew" (1999)

Method Man singles chronology
"The Riddler" (1995)	"Shadowboxin'" (1996)	"Wu-Wear: The Garment Renaissance" (1996)

Music video
- "Shadowboxin'" on YouTube

"Shadowboxin'" is a song by American rapper and Wu-Tang Clan member GZA, featuring fellow Wu-Tang member Method Man. It was released, along with "4th Chamber", as the fourth and final single from GZA's second studio album, Liquid Swords (1995), on March 28, 1996. The song was produced by RZA. It peaked at numbers 58 and 67 on the US Cash Box Top 100 and Billboard Hot 100 charts.

== Background and composition ==
The song contains dialogue from the film Shaolin vs Lama, and samples "Trouble, Heartaches & Sadness" by Ann Peebles. Method Man raps the first and third verses, while GZA raps the second. According to Method Man, GZA was supposed to rap two verses on the track.

== Critical reception ==
The song received generally positive reviews. XXL wrote that the repetitive chop of the sample "set the stage for Meth and GZA's master lyricism". In an interview with Wax Poetics, GZA praised Method Man's rapping, saying that the song "seemed more like Meth's track".

== Track listing ==
A-side:

1. Shadowboxin' Featuring Method Man (LP version) 3:31

2. Shadowboxin' Featuring Method Man (Clean) 3:31

3. Shadowboxin' (Instrumental) 3:31

B-side:

1. 4th Chamber Featuring Ghostface Killer, Killah Priest, RZA (LP version) 4:07

2. 4th Chamber Featuring Ghostface Killer, Killah Priest, RZA (Clean) 4:07

3. 4th Chamber (Instrumental) 4:07

== Charts ==
Chart (1996)	Peak position
US Billboard Hot 100	67
US Hot R&B/Hip-Hop Songs (Billboard)	41
US Hot Rap Songs (Billboard)	10
US Cash Box Top 100	58
