= Never Be the Same Again (Ghostface Killah song) =

Single by Ghostface Killah featuring Carl Thomas & Raekwon

from the album Bulletproof Wallets
- Released: September 4, 2001
- Genre: Hip hop
- Length: 4:15
- Label: Epic/SME
- Songwriters: Davel McKenzie, Sergio Moore, Brian Palmer, Corey Woods, Ghostface Killah
- Producers: Lilz & PLX

Ghostface Killah singles chronology
"Cherchez LaGhost" (2000)	"Never Be the Same Again" (2001)	"Ghost Showers" (2001)

Carl Thomas singles chronology
"Can't Believe" (2001)	"Never Be the Same Again" (2001)	"She Is" (2004)

Raekwon singles chronology
"100 Rounds" (2000)	"Never Be the Same Again" (2001)	"Smith Bros." (2003)

"Never Be the Same Again" is the lead single from the album Bulletproof Wallets by Ghostface Killah. The single features fellow Wu-Tang Clan member Raekwon and Carl Thomas. The single features a heavy R&B vibe, a departure from Ghost's normal output.

The song was later added to his greatest hits album Shaolin's Finest.

== Lyrical and music video content ==
Described as a "sappy love song", "Never Be the Same Again" is a departure for Ghost's usual street-oriented output. The video shows Ghost and his girl, played by actress LisaRaye, in a courtroom with Judge Mills Lane presiding.

== Track listing ==
=== A side ===
1. Album version
2. Instrumental version

=== B side ===
1. Radio edit
2. LP Acappella

== Charts ==
Chart (2002)	Peak Position
U.S. Billboard Hot R&B/Hip-Hop Songs	65
U.S. Billboard Hot Rap Tracks	21
