= Lust 2 =

Studio album by Depth Charge
- Released: 1999
- Genre: Trip hop
- Length: 45:55
- Label: DC Recordings
- Producer: J. Saul Kane

Depth Charge chronology
| Lust (1999) | Lust 2 (1999) | Spill - Rare & Unreleased Tracks 1993-1998 (2002) |

Lust 2 is the third album by Depth Charge, an alias of UK producer Jonathan Saul Kane. It was released only a month after Lust and was originally conceived as a remix companion to the previous album. Lust 2 was the last full-length studio album recorded under the Depth Charge name.

== Track list ==
1. Han Do Jin (Even Heroes Have To Die) (7:36)
2. Django (4:45)
3. Death And Diamonds (Is The Name Of The Game) (3:49)
4. Cut My Veins (4:36)
5. Model Does Sexy Weird (1:55)
6. 7 Hill Poison (3:53)
7. Ride (5:54)
8. Murder By Contract (4:28)
9. I... Always Do! (3:59)
10. Pretty Pretty (5:03)
