= Daytona 500 (song) =

- Vinyl cover

Single by Ghostface Killah featuring Force MDs, Raekwon, and Cappadonna

from the album Ironman
- A-side: "Camay"
- Released: October 7, 1996
- Recorded: 1996
- Genre: Hip hop; funk; East Coast hip hop
- Length: 4:40
- Label: Razor Sharp; Epic; Sony
- Songwriters: Dennis Coles; Corey Woods; Darryl Hill; Robert Diggs; Bob James
- Producer: RZA

Ghostface Killah singles chronology
"All That I Got Is You" (1996)	"Daytona 500" (1996)	"Motherless Child" (1997)

Raekwon singles chronology
"Motherless Child" (1996)	"Daytona 500" (1996)	"So Good" (1997)

"Daytona 500" is the second single by Wu-Tang Clan member Ghostface Killah, featuring Force MDs, Raekwon, and Cappadonna from his 1996 solo debut album Ironman. The title is taken from the most important and prestigious race on the NASCAR calendar: The Daytona 500. The song was later added to his greatest hits album, Shaolin's Finest.

== Music video ==
To complement the fast-paced nature of the track, the music video for "Daytona 500" shot from October 1–2, 1996 and is composed of clips from the original anime series Speed Racer. It is also one of the first and earliest anime music videos to be shown on a TV channel, and currently is one of the most popular anime music videos.

== Track listing ==
=== A Side ===
1. Camay (Radio Edit)
2. Camay (Album Version)
3. Camay (Instrumental)

=== B Side ===
1. Daytona 500 (Radio Edit)
2. Daytona 500 (Album Version)
3. Daytona 500 (Instrumental)

== Reception ==
Q stated that "'Daytona 500' is a magnificent, fast-paced testing of skills with Raekwon and Cappadonna".

== Samples ==
The song contains samples from:

- "Nautilus" by Bob James
- "Turn the Beat Around" by Vicki Sue Robinson
- "Crab Apple" by Idris Muhammad
- "Da Mystery of Chessboxin'" by the Wu-Tang Clan
- "Incarcerated Scarfaces" & "Ice Water" by Raekwon
