= All That I Got Is You =

Single by Ghostface Killah featuring Mary J. Blige & Popa Wu

from the album Ironman
- Released: September 22, 1996
- Recorded: 1995
- Genre: Hip hop; R&B
- Length: 5:20
- Label: Razor Sharp; Epic
- Songwriter(s): Dennis Coles; Mary Jane Blige; R. Diggs Jr.; Berry Gordy; Deke Richards; Alphonso Mizell; Freddie Perren
- Producer(s): RZA

Ghostface Killah singles chronology
| "4th Chamber" (1996) | "All That I Got Is You" (1996) | "Daytona 500" (1996) |

Mary J. Blige singles chronology
| "Can't Knock the Hustle" (1996) | "All That I Got Is You" (1996) | "Love Is All We Need" (1997) |

"All That I Got Is You" is the solo debut single by Wu-Tang Clan rapper Ghostface Killah, released as the lead single from his solo debut album Ironman. The song features R&B singer Mary J. Blige and an outro which has Popa Wu giving teachings. It contains a sample of "Maybe Tomorrow" by The Jackson 5 as well as audio clips from the cult film The Education of Sonny Carson.

Ghostface wrote the song as a tribute to his mother, with lyrics that both depict the harsh life the two struggled through together during his childhood and praise her ability to raise him even in their downtrodden state. About.com ranked it #87 on their list of the Top 100 Rap Songs. Ghostface added the song to his greatest hits album Shaolin's Finest and on the compilation album The RZA Hits.

== Music video ==
The music video for "All That I Got Is You" was directed by Terry Heller and Chuck Ozeas. Mary J. Blige was unavailable for the music video version, and is replaced by Wu-Tang Clan in-singer Tekitha for the hook and second verse. The video illustrates the images described within the lyrics of the song, featuring a young boy who portrays Ghostface in his youth born into a family of fifteen, with his mother, grandmother, aunts, uncles and cousins; all living in a three-bedroom apartment.

The boy experiences all the hardships depicted in the song: growing up in a poor family in the Stapleton Housing Projects, watching his father leave their family at the age of six, sharing a small bed with three other siblings, picking roaches out of water-filled cereal and going next door to borrow leftover bread from neighbors. The scenes are intercut with present-day Ghostface playing a piano in the middle of a desolate street and a small choir.

== Track listing ==
=== United States ===
1. "All That I Got Is You" (radio edit) – 3:45
2. "All That I Got Is You" (remix) – 3:59
3. "Camay" (album version) – 5:22
4. "Daytona 500" (album version) – 4:01

=== Europe ===
1. "All That I Got Is You" (remix edit) – 3:59
2. "All That I Got Is You" (remix) – 4:07
3. "All That I Got Is You" (remix instrumental) – 4:06

=== Remix ===
1. "All That I Got Is You" (single edit) – 3:52
2. "All That I Got Is You" (remix edit) – 3:59
3. "All That I Got Is You" (remix) – 4:07
4. "All That I Got Is You" (remix Instrumental) – 4:06

== Chart positions ==
| Chart (1997) | Peak position |
|---|---|
| US Billboard Hot R&B/Hip-Hop Airplay | 51 |
| UK Singles Chart | 11 |
