= Haas G =

Fantom of the Beat
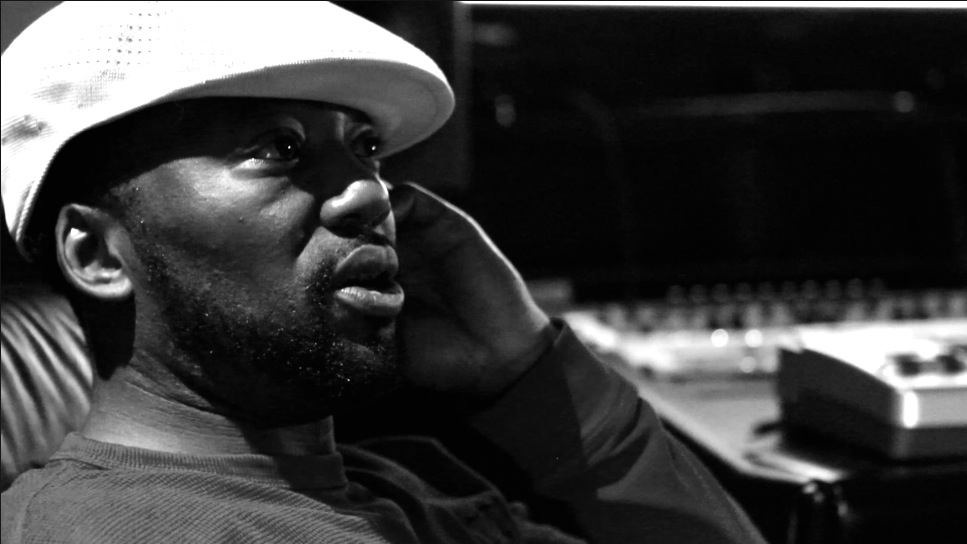

Background information
- Also known as: Haas G (UMC era)
- Born: Carlos Evans; March 24, 1971 (age 55); New York City, U.S.
- Genres: Hip hop; reggae; R&B
- Occupations: Rap artist; record producer
- Instruments: MPC2000; Ensoniq ASR-10; #LOGIC Weapon of Choice
- Years active: 1991–present
- Formerly of: The U.M.C.'s
- Website: www.facebook.com/umchiphop

Haas G (born Carlos Evans, a.k.a. Fantom of the Beat) is a Staten Island-based hip hop musician. Haas G was part of the 1990s rap duo the U.M.C.'s, and as Carlos Evans, he is credited as producer of the hit "Magic Stick" (Lil' Kim featuring 50 Cent).

== Biography ==
Opening the door for Staten Island Hip-Hop, Fantom of the Beat, born Carlos Evans, began his musical career as Haas G, part of the hip-hop duo UMC's. In the early 1990s UMC's won acclaim for their first single "Blue Cheese." (#1 Billboard rap single) Soon after, the second single, "One to Grow On" became Billboard's No. 1 Rap Song. (#2 Billboard rap single). Fantom is credited with producing songs on both of the UMC’s albums “Fruits of Nature" and "Unleashed."

Music, according to Fantom is the universal language. He credits a lifetime of exposure to a variety of genres for his success as a producer. His production credits, through Fantom of the Beat, span many artists in the hip-hop world including Sadat X, Raekwon, Inspectah Deck, G.Snyder, Ab.Money, Mic Handz, and Ms. Toi. He's worked with some of the world's most respected labels such as Def Jam Records, Aftermath Records, Koch Entertainment, Epic Records, and Universal Records. He produced Ghostface Killah’s "Apollo Kids" track from the Supreme Clientele album. This song helped turn Ghostface's solo career around, with critics calling it his "street credible resurrection song," and in addition, he produced "Take it Off" for Busta Rhymes on the album E.L.E. (Extinction Level Event): The Final World Front.

Fantom's credentials also include "Magic Stick" which he produced for Lil’ Kim and 50 Cent. This track was one of the most played songs in crossover urban markets and reached the No. 2 spot on the Billboard Hot 100 chart.

"Magic Stick" was featured in the (2005) movie, King's Ransom, and also appears on the soundtrack for the movie Now You See Me 2, starring Jesse Eisenberg and Morgan Freeman.

Fantom continues to stretch his production talents to include his trademark style combining elements of the late 1960s and 1970s, creating sounds which represent the struggle and the voice of the inner city. He takes his life experiences and applies them to music creating sounds that, in essence, are capable of moving people to take action.

“Music is a substantial part of my life; it’s how I express my fears, my sadness and happiness, my everything. My music is raw emotion," Fantom says. "The passion I feel for music shows through in everything I create."

== Discography ==
=== Albums ===
==== With The U.M.C.s ====
- Fruits of Nature (Wild Pitch/EMI Records, 1991)
  U.S. R&B & Hip Hop No. 32
  U.S. Heatseekers chart No. 36
- Unleashed (Wild Pitch/EMI Records, 1994)
  U.S. R&B & Hip Hop No. 63

=== Singles ===
==== With The U.M.C.'s ====
- "#NUDont" (2014)
- "Tried To Tell Ya'" (2014)
- "Blue Cheese" (1991)
- "One to Grow On" (1991)

==== As producer ====
- E.L.E. (Extinction Level Event): The Final World Front
  Track listing: Take It Off (Busta Rhymes, 1998)
- Supreme Clientele
  Track listing: Apollo Kids (Ghostface Killah, 1999)
- That Girl (Ms Toi, 2001)
- Guess Who's Back?
  Track listing: Rotten Apple (50 Cent, 2002)
- La Bella Mafia
  Track listing: Magic Stick (Lil' Kim featuring 50 Cent, 2003)
- The Movement
  Track listing: City High (Inspectah Deck, 2003)
- The Movement
  Track listing: Get Right (Inspectah Deck, 2003)
- The Movement
  Track listing: It's Like That (Inspectah Deck, 2003)
- The Movement
  Track listing: U Wanna Be (Inspectah Deck, 2003)
- The Movement
  Track listing: Framed (Inspectah Deck, 2003)
- The Movement
  Track listing: Bumpin' and Grindin (Inspectah Deck, 2003)
- The Movement
  Track listing: The Stereotype (Inspectah Deck, 2003)
- More Fish
  Track listing: Miguel Sanchez (Ghostface Killah, 2006)
- More Fish
  Track listing: Street Opera (Ghostface Killah, 2006)
- More Fish
  Track listing: Blue Armor (Ghostface Killah, 2006)
- More Fish
  Track listing: Cuban Chronicles (Raekwon, 2007)
- Cynthia's Son
  Track listing: No Luv (Inspectah Deck, 2014)

=== Features ===
- The Cleveland Show
  Brown Magic Episode (February 19, 2012)
  Track listing: Magic Stick
- King's Ransom
  Soundtrack
  Track listing: Magic Stick (2005)
- Now You See Me 2
  Soundtrack
  Track listing: Magic Stick (2016)
