= Bulletproof Wallets =

Studio album by Ghostface Killah
- Released: November 13, 2001
- Recorded: 2001
- Genre: Hip-hop
- Length: 46:38
- Label: Starks; Epic; Sony
- Producer: PLX; RZA; LILZ; Mathematics; Chris Liggio; Tally Galbreth; the Alchemist; Carlos "6 July" Broad; Rsonist; Underdawgz

Ghostface Killah chronology
Supreme Clientele (2000)	Bulletproof Wallets (2001)	The Pretty Toney Album (2004)

Wu-Tang Clan solo chronology
Digital Bullet (2001)	Bulletproof Wallets (2001)	Legend of the Liquid Sword (2002)

Singles from Bulletproof Wallets
- 1. "Never Be the Same Again" Released: September 4, 2001; 2. "Ghost Showers" Released: November 22, 2001

Bulletproof Wallets is the third studio album by Wu-Tang Clan member Ghostface Killah. The album was released on November 13, 2001, by Starks Enterprises and Epic Records. The album features the singles "Never Be the Same Again" and "Ghost Showers".

== Critical reception ==
Professional ratings
Review scores
Source	Rating
AllMusic	2.5/5 stars
Los Angeles Times	2/4 stars
Mixmag	3/5
NME	7/10
Q	3/5 stars
Rolling Stone	3.5/5 stars
The Rolling Stone Album Guide	4.5/5 stars
Spin	8/10
Vibe	4.5/5
The Village Voice	A−

Bulletproof Wallets received generally positive reviews from music critics. John Bush of AllMusic said, "Bulletproof Wallets is basically a party album, at least compared to the usual Wu-Tang gloom and doom, featuring smooth, romantic R&B tracks like the single "Never Be the Same Again" (with Carl Thomas & Raekwon) and "Love Session." Pat Blashill of Rolling Stone said, "Bulletproof Wallets is riveting because even on "The Juks," when he's rhyming about getting paid, he comes off like a tough but fatally vulnerable anti-hero, forever trapped in the headlights of oncoming disaster."

Mark Desrosiers of PopMatters said, "Bulletproof Wallets doesn't have the peering-into-the-abyss street insanity of Ironman, sure, but it does come close. And damn, it sure does air you out nonetheless." James Poletti of Yahoo! Music said, "Whilst Ghostface remains in possession of one of the most diverse musical imaginations in the Clan, this is ultimately disappointing in its lack of innovation."

== Commercial performance ==
Bulletproof Wallets debuted and peaked at number 34 on the Billboard 200, with first week sales of 76,000 copies.

== Track listing ==
No.	Title	Writer(s)	Producer(s)	Length
1.	"Intro - Stairway to Heaven"	Dennis David Coles	PLX	1:21
2.	"Maxine" (featuring Raekwon)	Coles; Corey Woods	RZA	3:46
3.	"Flowers" (featuring Raekwon, Method Man & Superb)	Coles; Woods; Clifford Smith, Jr.	RZA	3:26
4.	"Never Be the Same Again" (featuring Raekwon & Carl Thomas)	Coles; Woods; Carlton Neron Thomas	LILZ; PLX	4:26
5.	"Teddy Skit"	Coles	RZA	1:04
6.	"Theodore" (featuring Trife & Twiz)	Coles; Theodore Bailey; Thaddaeus Birkett	Mathematics	3:08
7.	"Ghost Showers" (featuring Madame Majestic)	Coles	Chris Liggio; Tally Galbreth (co.)	4:11
8.	"Strawberry" (featuring Killa Sin)	Coles; Robert Fitzgerald Diggs; Jeryl Grant	Mathematics	3:06
9.	"The Forest"	Coles; Alan Daniel Maman	The Alchemist	3:12
10.	"The Juks" (featuring Trife & Superb)	Coles; Jamel Cummings; Bailey; Maman	The Alchemist	4:08
11.	"Walking Through the Darkness" (featuring Tekitha)	Coles; Tekitha Washington	RZA	3:20
12.	"Jealousy" (Skit)	Coles	RZA	0:57
13.	"The Hilton" (featuring Raekwon)	Coles; Woods	Carlos "6 July" Broady	3:59
14.	"Ice (Interlude)"	Coles	Rsonist	1:01
15.	"Love Session" (featuring Ruff Endz)	Coles; Dante Jordan; David Chance	Underdawgz	3:40
16.	"Street Chemistry" (featuring Prodigal Sunn & Trife)	Coles; Lamar Ruff; Bailey; Maman	The Alchemist	1:55
Total length:				46:38

Sample credits

- "Intro" contains a sample from "Stairway to Heaven" by the O'Jays.
- "Maxine" contains a sample from "Harlem Clavinette" by J.J. Johnson.
- "Flowers" contains a sample from "Take Me to the Mardi Gras" by Bob James.
- "Teddy (Skit)" contains a sample from "Hope That We Can Be Together Soon" by Harold Melvin & the Blue Notes.
- "Theodore" contains a sample from "40,000 Headmen" by Blood, Sweat & Tears.
- "Ghost Showers" contains a sample from "Sunshower" by Dr. Buzzard's Original Savannah Band.
- "Strawberry" contains a sample from "Storm in the Summertime" by David Porter.
- "The Forest" contains a sample from the television series The Wonderful World of Disney.
- "Walking Through the Darkness" contains a sample from "Across 110th Street" by Bobby Womack.
- "The Juks" contains a sample from "Dos Amores Desiguales" by Chucho Avellanet.
- "Jealousy (Skit)" contains a sample from "Jealousy" by Ann Peebles.
- "The Hilton" contains a sample from "Maria" by Michael Jackson.
- "Ice (Interlude)" contains a sample from "She Is My Lady" by Donny Hathaway.

== Charts ==
=== Weekly charts ===
Chart (2001)	Peak position
US Billboard 200	34
US Top R&B/Hip-Hop Albums (Billboard)	2

=== Year-end charts ===
Chart (2002)	Position
US Top R&B/Hip-Hop Albums (Billboard)	90
