= 4th Chamber =

Single by GZA featuring RZA, Ghostface Killah and Killah Priest

Single by GZA featuring RZA, Ghostface Killah and Killah Priest

from the album Liquid Swords
- A-side: "Shadowboxin'" (double A-side)
- Released: March 28, 1996
- Recorded: 1995
- Genre: Hip-hop
- Length: 4:37
- Label: Geffen
- Songwriters: Gary Grice; Robert Diggs; Dennis Coles; Walter Reed
- Producer: RZA

GZA singles chronology
"Cold World" (1995)	"4th Chamber" / "Shadowboxin'" (1996)	"Crash Your Crew" (1999)

RZA singles chronology
"4th Chamber" (1996)	"Wu-Wear: The Garment Renaissance" (1996)

Ghostface Killah singles chronology
"Ice Cream" (1995)	"4th Chamber" (1996)	"All That I Got Is You" (1996)

Killah Priest singles chronology
"B.I.B.L.E. (Basic Instructions Before Leaving Earth)" (1995)	"4th Chamber" (1996)	"Tai Chi" (1998)

Music video
- "Shadowboxin' / 4th Chamber" on YouTube

"4th Chamber" is a song by American rapper and Wu-Tang Clan member GZA, released as the fourth and final single (along with "Shadowboxin'") from his second studio album Liquid Swords (1995), on March 28, 1996. It features fellow Wu-Tang members RZA and Ghostface Killah and American rapper Killah Priest. The song contains samples from the film Shogun Assassin, "Assassin With Son" by W. Michael Lewis & Mark Lewis from the movie Shogun Assassin, "Groovin'" by Willie Mitchell and "Dharmatma Theme Music (Sad)" by Kalyanji Anandji.

== Background ==
GZA stated in an interview with Wax Poetics:

Making "4th Chamber" was crazy because I didn't have a rhyme ready for that one. That's why I went last on it. Plus, Ghost killed it with his verse so I knew I had to come correct. It's not even a GZA song to me—it's a Wu-Tang song. And Ghost's verse is just incredible to me. He delivered so well. I don't know if you saw the video, I directed that too. This song, the guest verses, the video, the crowd response, all turned out perfect for this one."

== Composition ==
"4th Chamber"

The song begins with dialogue excerpt from Shogun Assassin: "Choose the sword and you will join me, choose the ball and you will join your mother in death." Built on an electric guitar-laden beat, it features an "impossibly bugged-out synth hook". In Ghostface Killah's verse, he asks complex metaphysical questions and mentions "sipping rum out of Stanley Cups".

== Critical reception ==
The song received generally positive reviews. Cheo Hodari Coker of Los Angeles Times, describing the song to be "hypnotic", cited it as one of the songs from Liquid Swords that "add to the evidence that the Wu-Tang Clan are the kings of New York rap." Steve "Flash" Juon of RapReviews wrote, "the raw verbal assaults of Killah Priest, RZA, and Ghostface Killah share the spotlight with GZA on '4th Chamber.' Built on a track which was heavy metal and headbanging long Limp Bizkit became trendy, the track bubbles over with the supreme confidence only a crew of rappers sitting on top of the world could possibly have. Just peep the boastful and disdainful lyricism of Killah Priest as an example". Chris Smith from Stylus Magazine wrote, "soon gives way to an even more astonishing, hyperactive RZA verse, rich in breathless they've-got-documents-on-it-locked-away but-they-know-we're-onto-them and-they're-coming-for-us paranoia with a righteous-anger, gnomic undertone. It doesn't make much sense, but it sure is amazing." In a review of the album, Ian Cohen of Pitchfork stated "Outside of RZA's phenomenal third-eye verse from '4th Chamber' (yell 'lynched the prominent dominant Islamic, Asiatic black Hebrew' on the subway, it's fun), there is almost nothing here that can't be easily understood by a teenager." Rachel Greenberg of Okayplayer commented that Ghostface Killah "spaz[zes] out on [a] stellar guest turn".

== Track listing ==
A-side:

1. Shadowboxin' Featuring Method Man (LP version) 3:31

2. Shadowboxin' Featuring Method Man (Clean) 3:31

3. Shadowboxin' (Instrumental) 3:31

B-side:

1. 4th Chamber Featuring Ghostface Killer, Killah Priest, RZA (LP version) 4:07

2. 4th Chamber Featuring Ghostface Killer, Killah Priest, RZA (Clean) 4:07

3. 4th Chamber (Instrumental) 4:07
