= Liquid Swords =

1995 studio album by GZA

Studio album by Genius/GZA
- Released: November 7, 1995
- Studios: RZA's basement studio, New York City
- Genres: East Coast hip-hop; hardcore hip-hop
- Length: 50:48
- Label: Geffen
- Producer: RZA

Genius/GZA chronology
Words from the Genius (1991)	Liquid Swords (1995)	Beneath the Surface (1999)

Wu-Tang Clan solo chronology
Only Built 4 Cuban Linx... (1995)	Liquid Swords (1995)	Ironman (1996)

Singles from Liquid Swords
- 1. "I Gotcha' Back" Released: August 22, 1994; 2. "Liquid Swords" Released: October 10, 1995; 3. "Cold World" Released: November 28, 1995; 4. "Shadowboxin'" / "4th Chamber" Released: March 28, 1996

Liquid Swords is the second solo studio album by the American rapper and Wu-Tang Clan member GZA, released on November 7, 1995, by Geffen Records. Recording sessions for the album began midway through 1995 at producer RZA's basement studio in the New York City borough of Staten Island. The album heavily samples dialogue from the martial arts film Shogun Assassin and maintains a dark atmosphere throughout, incorporating lyrical references to chess, crime and philosophy. Liquid Swords features numerous guest appearances from the other eight members of Wu-Tang Clan along with Wu-Tang affiliate Killah Priest.

Upon its release, Liquid Swords peaked at number nine on the Billboard 200 chart, and number two on the Top R&B/Hip-Hop Albums chart. The Recording Industry Association of America (RIAA) certified the album platinum in sales nearly 20 years after its release. Liquid Swords received critical acclaim for its complex lyricism and hypnotic musical style. Over the years, its recognition has grown, with a number of famous publishers proclaiming it to be one of the greatest hip hop albums of all time. In 2007, the Chicago Tribune cited it as "one of the most substantial lyrical journeys in hip-hop history".

== Background and recording ==
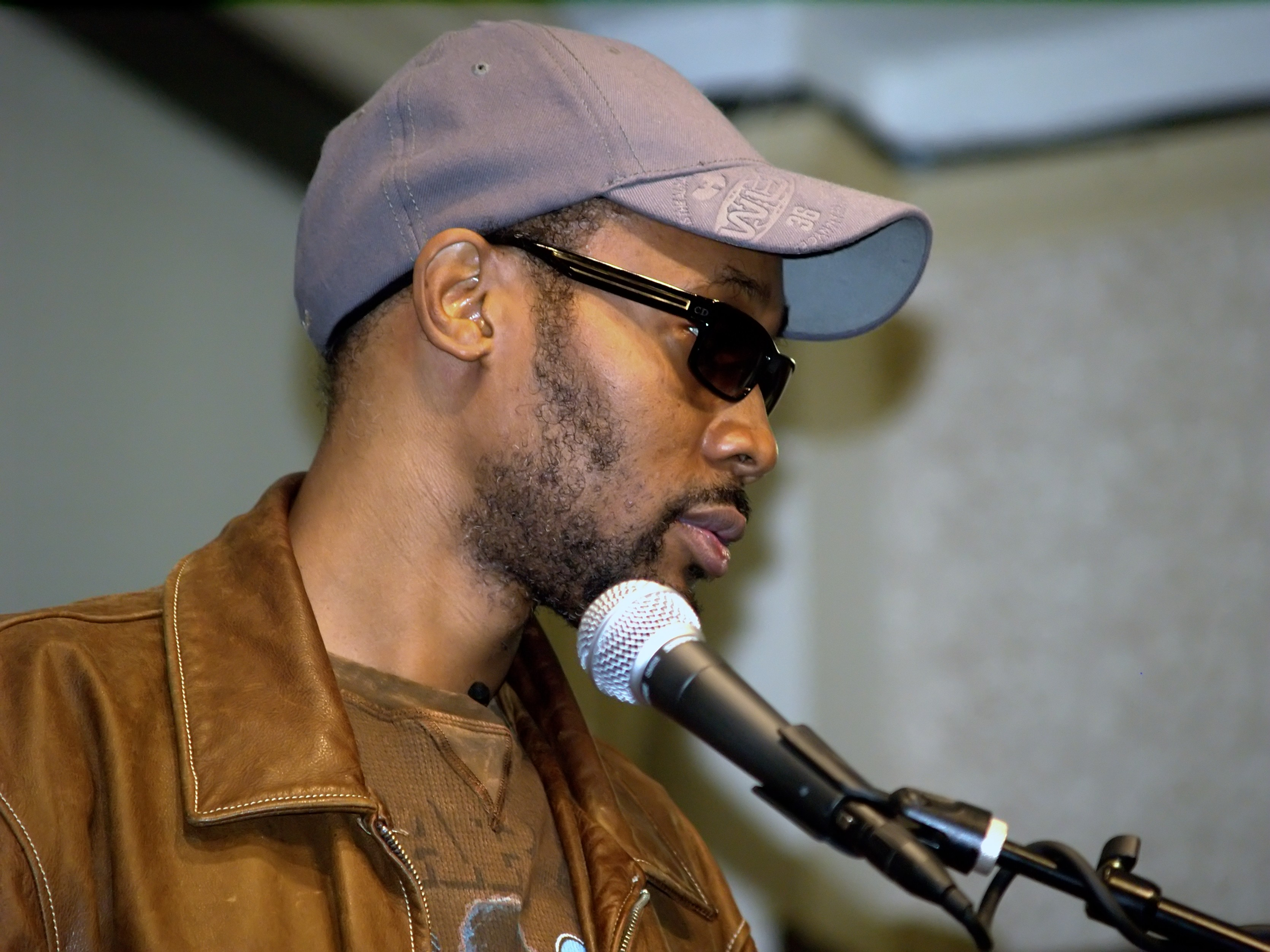
Producer RZA (pictured in 2009) began recording the album after finishing several other Wu-Tang projects.

Following the success of two earlier Wu-Tang Clan solo albums – Method Man's Tical and Ol' Dirty Bastard's Return to the 36 Chambers: The Dirty Version, Wu-Tang member Raekwon began recording his acclaimed debut Only Built 4 Cuban Linx... in early 1995. While he and producer RZA were putting the final touches on that album, RZA and GZA began writing and recording what would eventually become Liquid Swords. In regards to their decision to begin the album at the time they did, GZA later commented, "We (Wu-Tang) were on a roll, and it was the perfect time to get in the studio and just do it."

"I'm on a different level, trying to be cinematic," he remarked. "Like that shit in 'Killah Hill' where the kid gets his leg cut to hide the dope – that shit really happened, but I'm trying to make it more visual. Liquid Swords is a concept of being lyrically sharp, flowing like liquid metal – mercury, y'know? It comes from this flick, Legend of the Liquid Sword, where people would get their head cut off but it would still be on their shoulders. No one else would notice, because the sword was so sharp. Wu-Tang is a sword style, and this here is the sharpest. I'd rather slip on the pavement than slip on my tongue."

Similar to other early solo Wu-Tang albums, Liquid Swords was recorded in RZA's basement studio in Staten Island, with some beats playing for over two days straight while recording. When asked in a later interview about his opinion of the album's beats, GZA remarked "I loved them. A lot of them had a grimy, rock-like feel to them. I just remember absolutely loving them." In the same interview, GZA described the writing process as "real slow." He further commented "I don’t say slow in the sense that it necessarily took me a long time to finish what I’m writing. I mean, Raekwon and Ghostface can step in and record a song in about forty-five minutes. I on the other hand, would often go back and finish rhymes that I started. I would say I pieced things together more slowly then. Songs generally take me two to three days to write. Sometimes I take different sentences and put them together."

Regarding the overall sensation of writing Liquid Swords, GZA stated "It's hard to say something is gonna be classic or not. But I can say that I felt the magic with this one. I actually saw it grow and come together, and felt that it was special as we were doing it." He later noted in an interview with The Seattle Times: "It has great songs, it's not an ignorant album, it doesn't sound dated. If you listen to it and compare it to what's out now, it's timeless. Lyrically, it's not my best work. Not at all. But the chemistry? Production? Overall, I mean, c'mon! RZA's atmospheric production? Yes. It's my best album."

== Promotion ==
"Cold World"
The track features gritty, surreal lyrics, simple musical variation, and an eerie-sounding, RZA-produced beat.

"4th Chamber"
The lyrically raw track contains an electric guitar-laden beat and metaphysical imagery by Ghostface Killah.

"I Gotcha Back"
The album's lead single has a looping, feverish horn line and lyrics about urban, criminal lifestyle.

The album's cover was designed by Milestone Media Founder/Creative Director and chief artist Denys Cowan, according to the album's liner notes. Cowan's black and white line art was inked by Inker Prentis Rollins. Milestone's Color Editor, Jason Scott Jones created the cover color art digitally at a time when digital coloring was emerging in comic art eventually becoming the standard. GZA's personal manager Geoffrey L. Garfield, commissioned Cowan. Garfield, an avid comic book fan, said the cover art was supervised under the auspices of GZA GrafX, a subsidiary company of GZA Entertainment owned by GZA and Garfield. The concept of the chessboard with its sword-wielding warriors was conceived by GZA, an avid chess player. The GZA version of the Wu-Tang Clan logo, the "G" using the logo iconography, was rendered by Wu-Tang Clan DJ Mathematics who was also an accomplished graphic artist.

GZA also enjoyed a successful side career as a music video director, and with Garfield as writer and producer, created all four videos for the Liquid Swords album ("Liquid Swords", "Cold World", "Shadowboxin'/4th Chamber", and "I Gotcha' Back"), and also did videos for Sunz of Man, Ghostface Killah's song ("Motherless Child") on the Sunset Park film soundtrack, Shabazz the Disciple (Penalty Records) and Case (Def Jam). The Source recognized their video "Shadowboxin'/4th Chamber" as one of the Top Five Videos of 1995.

Liquid Swords was performed in its entirety on July 13, 2007, at the Pitchfork Music Festival and again in England, on December 9 at All Tomorrow's Parties and on December 10 at KOKO in London, as part of the ATP-curated Don't Look Back series. After the cancellation of an appearance in Brooklyn, New York, the performance was rescheduled for December 13 and 14 at the Knitting Factory in New York.

=== Singles ===
Four total singles were released for Liquid Swords. The first of which was "I Gotcha' Back", released August 22, 1994. Similar to Raekwon's single "Heaven & Hell," the song first appeared on the soundtrack for the movie Fresh, and was the first song written for the album, with its version being re-recorded in 1995. Describing the song's background and theme, GZA later stated "This was a short rhyme I wrote for one of my nephews. When I said, 'My lifestyle so far from well, could've wrote a book called Age Twelve and Going Through Hell.' It's for my nephew who was twelve at the time, and whose father, my brother, had been locked up since '88. So he wasn't around for my nephew when times were rough, so I wanted to up my nephew a bit with this track. I had two nephews in the video, they were both real young at the time. And in video, they both had met up and shots rang out from some young gangsters. It's a shame because both those kids in the video, both nephews of mine, ended up getting in trouble for ringing out shots and are both doing time right now. It's kind of ironic. One of my nephews ended up getting eights years for that shit. So the whole song is a sad irony to me now."

The second single released for the album, was the title track "Liquid Swords", released over one year later on October 10, 1995. GZA later commented "Usually I take a beat home and write to it for a few days, but it wasn’t like that with this track. I think RZA played the beat for me and I just spit to it right there. The hook was actually a routine from around ‘84 that me RZA and Ol' Dirty would do: 'When the emcees came, to live out the name.' Just like that."

November 28, 1995 saw the release of the album's third single "Cold World". In regards to his writing approach to the song, GZA stated "Normally, when I hear a beat, I already know where to go with it. I can picture the track and just vibe off it. As soon as I heard the beat to “Cold World,” I knew it would be another inner-city story."

The fourth and final single released for the album was "Shadowboxin'", released early 1996, with "4th Chamber" as its B-Side. In an interview with Wax Poetics, GZA praised Method Man's rapping on "Shadowboxin'", saying that the song "seemed more like Meth's track". GZA stated "Making '4th Chamber' was crazy because I didn’t have a rhyme ready for that one. That’s why I went last on it. Plus, Ghost killed it with his verse so I knew I had to come correct. It’s not even a GZA song to me—it’s a Wu-Tang song. And Ghost’s verse is just incredible to me. He delivered so well. I don’t know if you saw the video, I directed that too. This song, the guest verses, the video, the crowd response, all turned out perfect for this one."

== Critical reception ==
Professional ratings
Aggregate scores
Source	Rating
Metacritic	94/100
Review scores
Source	Rating
AllMusic	5/5 stars
Entertainment Weekly	B+
The Guardian	4/5 stars
Los Angeles Times	3.5/4 stars
NME	9/10
Pitchfork	10/10
Q	4/5 stars
Record Collector	5/5 stars
Rolling Stone	3/5 stars
The Source	4/5 stars

Upon its release, Liquid Swords received critical acclaim. Selwyn Seyfu Hinds from The Source called GZA "a highly focused master-graftsman" and felt that "throughout Liquid Swords he maintains a clear, precise flow, one that reflects deadly-sharp purpose and skilled execution." Hinds also praised RZA's production on the album, noting his "increasingly sophisticated style: shuffling kicks, neck snapping snares, haunting melodies via strings or vibe-like textures and penetrating bass tones." In his review for Entertainment Weekly, Dimitri Ehrlich said that, "With its tight beat, Liquid Swords emphasizes the finesse with which GZA weaves his vocals over straightforward rhythms." Los Angeles Times critic Cheo H. Coker described GZA as "a hip-hop M. C. Escher" whose lyrics "reveal layer after layer of thought with repeated listening", concluding that the album cements the Wu-Tang Clan as "the kings of New York rap."

NME hailed Liquid Swords as "the best hip-hop album" in years, citing RZA's "spooked, creaky, incredibly dense" production and GZA's complex and "quite brilliant" lyrics. Mojo magazine characterized the album as "creepily beautiful" and "East Coast hip hop with a far more warped and disturbing slant on inner-city sickness than the in-your-face Californian equivalent". In Select, Matt Hall wrote that RZA "provides a series of austere rhythms, sparsely dotting violin stabs and plucked harps to provide the perfect backdrop to Genius' downbeat tales of New York's mean streets… Liquid Swords sneaks under the tape to qualify as Rap Album Of The Year." Tom Doyle of Q wrote that GZA can seem "perhaps unreasonably hardcore in some of his approaches...[but] when his rhyming is enhanced by the dislocated soul chorus of 'Cold World', the result is dramatic and hypnotic."

Robert Christgau was somewhat less enthusiastic, giving the album a two-star honorable mention, which indicated a "likable effort that consumers attuned to its overriding aesthetic or individual vision may well enjoy". In his column for The Village Voice, Christgau cited "Shadowboxin'" and "Killah Hills 10304" as highlights and called the record "gangsta [rap] as mystery, religious and literary".

=== Retrospect ===
Liquid Swords continues to be held in high regard as one of the best releases in the Wu-Tang Clan's catalog and among the greatest hip hop albums of all time. According to AllMusic critic Steve Huey, it is "often acclaimed as the best Wu-Tang solo project of all" and "cemented the Genius/GZA's reputation as the best pure lyricist in the group—and one of the best of the '90s". Huey likewise viewed it as a significant progression for RZA as a producer, noting his experiments "with stranger sounds and more layered tracks", while evaluating Liquid Swords as "one of the group's undisputed classics", along with Enter the Wu-Tang (36 Chambers) (1993) and Raekwon's Only Built 4 Cuban Linx... (1995). Reviewing Liquid Swords for RapReviews' "Back to the Lab" series, writer Steve Juon called it "an album of 100% Wu-Tang sonic mastery", adding that among Wu-Tang Clan solo albums, "it may the best—if not one of the top two or three." Nick Catucci, writing in The New Rolling Stone Album Guide (2004), said that, on the album, GZA "went goth, painting the Wu's street grime black." Record Collector's Paul Bowler stated that Liquid Swords represented an artistic peak for the Wu-Tang Clan as a whole, noting what he found to be their subsequent creative decline from Wu-Tang Forever (1997) onward. Chris Smith from Stylus Magazine wrote that the group "never yet managed to make anything this memorable, otherworldly, and strangely beautiful again."

On October 8, 2015, the Recording Industry Association of America announced that Liquid Swords had earned a platinum certification for having sold more than 1 million copies. It became the first Wu-Tang-related album to get certified since 2004, when Method Man and Ghostface Killah both earned plaques.

== Track listing ==
Track listing information is taken from the official liner notes and AllMusic. All tracks produced by RZA, except track 13 produced by 4th Disciple.

Liquid Swords
No.	Title	Writer(s)	Length
1.	"Liquid Swords"	Gary Grice; Robert Diggs; Eddie Brigati; Felix Cavaliere	4:31
2.	"Duel of the Iron Mic^{[a]}" (featuring Inspectah Deck, Masta Killa, and Ol' Dirty Bastard)	Grice; Diggs; Elias Wrubel; Herbert Magidson	4:06
3.	"Living in the World Today"	Grice; Diggs	4:23
4.	"Gold"	Grice; Diggs	3:57
5.	"Cold World" (featuring Inspectah Deck and Life)	Grice; Diggs; Jason Hunter; Eldra DeBarge; Stevland Morris	5:30
6.	"Labels"	Grice; Diggs	2:54
7.	"4th Chamber" (featuring Ghostface Killah, Killah Priest, and RZA)	Grice; Diggs	4:37
8.	"Shadowboxin'" (featuring Method Man)	Grice; Diggs	3:30
9.	": Hell's Wind Staff"^{[b]}; "Killah Hills 10304; "	Grice; Diggs	5:09
10.	"Investigative Reports" (featuring Ghostface Killah, Raekwon, and U-God)	Grice; Diggs; Corey Woods; Dennis Coles; Lamont Hawkins	3:50
11.	"Swordsman^{[c]}"	Grice; Diggs; Walter Reed	3:21
12.	"I Gotcha Back"	Grice; Diggs	5:01
Total length:			50:48

Bonus track (CD only)
No.	Title	Writer(s)	Length
13.	"B.I.B.L.E. (Basic Instructions Before Leaving Earth)" (performed by Killah Priest)	Reed; El-Divine Amir Bey	4:33
Total length:			55:24

2012 Bonus disc: The Full-Length Instrumentals
No.	Title	Length
1.	"Liquid Swords"	3:29
2.	"Duel of the Iron Mic"	3:45
3.	"Living in the World Today"	4:24
4.	"Gold"	4:17
5.	"Cold World"	5:21
6.	"Labels"	3:08
7.	"4th Chamber"	4:17
8.	"Shadowboxin'"	3:30
9.	"Killah Hills 10304"	4:24
10.	"Investigative Reports"	4:10
11.	"I Gotcha Back"	4:08
Total length:		44:48

Notes

- ^{^[a]} "Duel of the Iron Mic" erroneously lists Dreddy Kruger as featured artist.
- ^{^[b]} "Hell's Wind Staff" erroneously lists Dreddy Kruger, Killah Priest, and Masta Killa as featured artists.
- ^{^[c]} "Swordsman" erroneously lists Killah Priest as featured artist.

Sample credits

- "Liquid Swords" contains samples from "Groovin'" and "Mercy, Mercy, Mercy" by Willie Mitchell, and "Legend of Lone Wolf" by W. Michael Lewis & Mark Lindsay from the movie Shogun Assassin.
- "Duel of the Iron Mic" contains a sample from "I'm Afraid the Masquerade Is Over" by David Porter, and dialogue excerpts from the films Shogun Assassin and Dragon on Fire.
- "Living in the World Today" contains samples from "I'm His Wife, You're Just a Friend" by Ann Sexton and "In The Hole" by The Bar-Kays.
- "Gold" contains a sample from "The Aries" by Cannonball Adderley.
- "Cold World" contains samples from "In The Rain" by The Dramatics and "Plastic People" by The Mothers of Invention, interpolations from "Rocket Love" by Stevie Wonder and "Love Me In A Special Way" by DeBarge, and dialogue excerpts from the film Shogun Assassin.
- "Labels" contains a sample from "Don't Leave Me This Way" by Thelma Houston.
- "4th Chamber" contains a dialogue excerpt from the film Shogun Assassin, and samples from "Assassin With Son" by W. Michael Lewis & Mark Lewis from the movie Shogun Assassin, "Groovin'" by Willie Mitchell and "Dharmatma Theme Music (Sad)" by Kalyanji Anandji.
- "Shadowboxin'" contains a dialogue excerpt from the film Shaolin vs Lama, and a sample from "Trouble, Heartaches & Sadness" by Ann Peebles.
- "Hell's Wind Staff" contains an interpolation of "Lost in Love" by New Edition and "Killah Hills 10304" contains a sample from "Soul Vibrations" by Dorothy Ashby.
- "Investigative Reports" contains a sample from "I'd Be So Happy" by Three Dog Night.
- "I Gotcha Back" contains a dialogue excerpt from the film Shogun Assassin and samples from "As Long as I've Got You" by The Charmels and "Is It Him or Me" by Jackie Jackson.
- "B.I.B.L.E. (Basic Instructions Before Leaving Earth)" contains a sample from "Our Love Has Died" by the Ohio Players.

== Personnel ==
- GZA – performer
- RZA – producer, performer
- Killah Priest – performer
- Inspectah Deck – performer
- Ghostface Killah – performer
- Method Man – performer
- Masta Killa – performer
- Raekwon – performer
- U-God – performer
- Ol' Dirty Bastard – performer
- Dreddy Kruger – vocals
- Life – vocals
- 4th Disciple – producer
- Tom Coyne – mastering
- Wendy Goldstein – A&R
- Geoffrey L. Garfield – personal management
- Cyril Gittens – art direction
- Mathematics – art concepts
- Mark A. Humphrey – photography
- Denys Cowan – cover art

== Charts ==
=== Weekly charts ===
Chart (1995)	Peak position
US Billboard 200	9
US Top R&B/Hip-Hop Albums (Billboard)	2

Chart (2026)	Peak position
Greek Albums (IFPI)	77

=== Year-end charts ===
Chart (1996)	Position
US Billboard 200	183
US Top R&B/Hip-Hop Albums (Billboard)	47

== Certifications ==
Region	Certification	Certified units/sales
United Kingdom (BPI)	Gold	100,000^{‡}
United States (RIAA)	Platinum	1,000,000^{^}
^{^} Shipments figures based on certification alone.^{‡} Sales+streaming figures based on certification alone.

== Accolades ==
- (*) signifies unordered lists

Publication	Country	Accolade	Year	Rank
About.com	United States	100 Greatest Hip-Hop Albums	2008	62
About.com	United States	Best Rap Albums of 1995	2008	3
Ego Trip	United States	Hip Hop's 25 Greatest Albums by Year 1980–1998	1999	3
Face	United Kingdom	Albums of the year	1995	16
The Guardian	United Kingdom	1000 Albums to Hear Before You Die	2007	*
Hip-Hop Connection	United Kingdom	The 100 Greatest Rap Albums 1995–2005	2006	7
HUMO	Belgium	Albums of the Year	1995	13
Melody Maker	United Kingdom	Albums of the Year	1995	42
NME	United Kingdom	Albums of the Year	1995	30
OOR	Netherlands	Albums of the Year	1995	24
Paste	United States	300 Greatest Albums of All Time	2024	174
Pitchfork	United States	Top 100 Albums of the 1990s	2003	87
Q	United Kingdom	Albums of the Year	1995	*
Robert Dimery	United States	1001 Albums You Must Hear Before You Die	2005	*
Rolling Stone	United States	Top 25 Hip Hop Albums (by Chris Rock)	2005	13
Rolling Stone	United States	The 500 Greatest Albums of All Time	2020	347
Select	United Kingdom	The 100 Best Albums of the 90s	1999	42
Select	United Kingdom	Albums of the Year	1996	36
The Source	United States	The 100 Best Rap Albums of All Time	1998	*
Stylus Magazine	United States	Top 101–200 Albums of All time	2004	137

== Bibliography ==
- RZA, The; Chris Norris (2005). The Wu-Tang Manual. New York, NY: The Penguin Group. ISBN 1-59448-018-4.
