= The U.M.C.'s =

American hip hop group

The UMC's
- Also known as: The U.M.C.'s; Universal M.C.'s; The Fruits; Undisputed Mastas of Chrizma; Understanding Many Concepts; Usage May Change
- Origin: Staten Island, New York City, U.S.
- Genre: Hip hop
- Years active: 1989–1994
- Labels: Wild Pitch; EMI
- Formerly of: Roughhouse Orchestra
- Past members: Haas G Kool Kim

The UMC's (an initialism for Undisputed Masters of Charisma or Universal M.C.'s, or stylised as The U.M.C.'s) was an American hip hop duo from the borough of Staten Island in New York City active from 1989-1994.

The group was composed of Haas G and Kool Kim, they sparked their career in 1989 under the name Universal M.C.'s with the songs "Invaders" and "Party Stylin'" on the compilation album "Roughhouse Orchestra".

In 1991 they released their debut album Fruits of Nature in 1991, which garnered chart success with the duo's No. 1 Billboard Hot Rap Single, "Blue Cheese", and No. 2 Hot Rap Single, "One To Grow On."

In 1994, the duo released its second album, Unleashed, It received 1 single titled "Hit The Track" but it gained little success, so The UMC's split up soon after its release due to label disputes and personal pursuits.

Since the group's break-up, Haas G (under the names Hassan and Fantom of the Beat) has focused on producing music, most notably garnering a No. 1 hit for Lil' Kim featuring 50 Cent, with "Magic Stick". Kool Kim reinvented himself as the controversial underground emcee NYOIL.

== Discography ==
- Fruits of Nature (Wild Pitch/EMI Records, 1991) U.S. R&B No. 32
- Unleashed (Wild Pitch/EMI Records, 1994) U.S. R&B No. 63
