= Apollo Kids (song) =

Song by Ghostface Killah from Supreme Clientele

Single by Ghostface Killah featuring Raekwon

from the album Supreme Clientele
- Released: December 10, 1999
- Recorded: 1999
- Genre: Hip hop
- Length: 3:54
- Label: Epic; Razor Sharp
- Songwriters: Solomon Burke; Dennis Coles; Carlos Evans; Corey Woods
- Producer: Hassan

Ghostface Killah singles chronology
"Motherless Child" (1997)	"Apollo Kids" (1999)	"Cherchez La Ghost" (2000)

Raekwon singles chronology
"Live From New York" (1999)	"Apollo Kids" (1999)	"100 Rounds" (2000)

Audio sample
- Apollo Kids: file; help

"Apollo Kids" is a song by rapper Ghostface Killah, released as the lead single of his second album Supreme Clientele. The song features fellow Wu-Tang Clan member Raekwon and contains a sample of "Cool Breeze" as performed by R&B singer/songwriter Solomon Burke. It was later added to his greatest hits album Shaolin's Finest.

== Music video ==
The music video for "Apollo Kids" was directed by Chris Robinson and set in Staten Island. The video showcases Starks Enterprises, portrayed as a gigantic factory where shoes are manufactured, for which Ghostface as Toney Starks stands as CEO. Ghostface spends much of the video donning mink coats and rapping while eating a golden ice cream cone.

== Track listing ==
1. "Apollo Kids" (radio version) (3:56)
2. "Apollo Kids" (instrumental) (3:56)
3. "Apollo Kids" (LP version) (3:54)
4. "Apollo Kids" (a cappella) (3:26)

== Charts ==
Chart (2000)	Peak position
U.S. Billboard Hot Rap Singles	32
U.S. Billboard Hot R&B/Hip-Hop Singles Sales	75
U.S. Billboard Bubbling Under R&B/Hip-Hop Singles	21
