= Cold World (GZA song) =

1995 single by GZA featuring Inspectah Deck

Single by GZA featuring Inspectah Deck

from the album Liquid Swords
- Released: November 28, 1995
- Genre: Hip-hop
- Length: 5:30
- Label: Geffen
- Songwriters: Gary Grice; Robert Diggs; Stevland Morris; El DeBarge
- Producer: RZA

GZA singles chronology
"Liquid Swords" (1995)	"Cold World" (1995)	"Shadowboxin'" / "4th Chamber" (1996)

Inspectah Deck singles chronology
"Cold World" (1995)	"REC Room" (1998)

Music video
- "Cold World" on YouTube

"Cold World" is a song by the American rapper and Wu-Tang Clan member GZA, released on November 28, 1995, as the second single from his second solo album, Liquid Swords (1995). It features fellow Wu-Tang member Inspectah Deck and singer Life. The song contains samples from "In the Rain" by the Dramatics, "Plastic People" by the Mothers of Invention, and sounds from the film Shogun Assassin. The interpolations of "Rocket Love" by Stevie Wonder and "Love Me in a Special Way" by DeBarge resulted in both Wonder and DeBarge credited as songwriters.

== Background ==
About writing the song, GZA said, "Normally, when I hear a beat, I already know where to go with it. I can picture the track and just vibe off it. As soon as I heard the beat to 'Cold World,' I knew it would be another inner-city story."

== Composition ==
The song opens with dialogue excerpt from Shogun Assassin. It features gritty and surreal lyrics, while the production uses a simple musical variation, with the beat containing a strong bassline, crisp drums and hi-hats, in addition to occasional plucked guitars echoing eerily and the sound of a snowstorm howling into the background. The chorus is sung by Life and takes lyrics from Stevie Wonder's "Rocket Love". Lyrically, the song narrates a tale of ghetto murder on New Year's Eve.

== Critical reception ==
Steve "Flash" Juon of RapReviews wrote of the song, "The instrumental alone is a Wu-banger, but when hearing Inspectah Deck provide the guest verse following GZA's it not only solidifies the dopeness of the cut but damn near upstages GZA's reputation as the tightest lyricist in the Clan".

== Remix ==
The song later received a remix, in which Life's feature was replaced by D'Angelo.

== Charts ==
Chart (1995)	Peak position
US Billboard Hot 100	97
US Hot R&B/Hip-Hop Songs (Billboard)	57
US Hot Rap Songs (Billboard)	8
