= Ironman (Ghostface Killah album) =

Studio album by Ghostface Killah
- Released: October 29, 1996
- Genre: East Coast hip-hop
- Length: 64:48
- Labels: Razor Sharp; Wu-Tang; Epic Street; Epic
- Producers: RZA (also exec.); Mitchell Diggs (exec.); Oli Grant (exec.); D.Coles (exec.); True Master

Ghostface Killah chronology
Ironman (1996)	Supreme Clientele (2000)

Wu-Tang Clan solo chronology
Liquid Swords (1995)	Ironman (1996)	The Pillage (1998)

Singles from Ironman
- 1. "All That I Got Is You" Released: September 22, 1996; 2. "Daytona 500" Released: October 7, 1996; 3. "Motherless Child" Released: October 29, 1996

Ironman is the debut studio album by American rapper Ghostface Killah, released on October 29, 1996, by Razor Sharp Records, Wu-Tang Records, and Epic Street, a division of Epic Records. It was produced by fellow Wu-Tang Clan member RZA. The album's music draws prominently on blaxploitation films and soul samples. As with other solo debuts from the group's members, Ironman contains references to the Nation of Gods and Earths.

Ironman peaked at number two on the Billboard 200 chart. It was certified platinum by the Recording Industry Association of America. Many music critics have praised the album for Ghostface Killah's imaginative lyricism and RZA's production style, with some revering it as one of the greatest Wu-Tang solo albums.

== Music and lyrics ==
"After the Smoke Is Clear"
The song features crooning vocals by the Delfonics and raw lyricism by Ghostface Killah and Raekwon.

Although a solo album, Ironman features many Wu-Tang collaborations and only four tracks feature Ghostface performing as the sole rapper. The two most prominently featured artists are Raekwon and Cappadonna, who both accompany Ghost and have their names on the album's cover. Raekwon appears on 12 of the 17 tracks, with "The Faster Blade" featuring him performing solo. Cappadonna appears on five tracks.

As opposed to earlier Wu-Tang solo projects, in which the performers involved were believed to be infallible, Ghostface is somewhat vulnerable on several of the album's songs. This is perhaps best illustrated on the single, "All That I Got Is You", which is essentially a tribute to his mother. However, the rest of the album contains many street oriented, and organized crime topics, similar to Only Built 4 Cuban Linx..., in which Ghostface was heavily involved. Ironman contains more of Ghostface Killah's highly praised unique uptempo, stream-of-consciousness rhyming style, which he would go on to further utilize on his highly acclaimed second studio album Supreme Clientele. The album also features a substantial amount of story-telling rap, such as the song "260". Producer RZA combines his dark keyboard tones and early-1970s soul samples, heavily used on Only Built for Cuban Linx... and Liquid Swords respectively, to engender a soulful and melodic, yet dark and harsh feel that later influenced many other Wu-Tang releases, such as Wu-Tang Forever and Uncontrolled Substance, as well as numerous other East Coast artists.

In his book The Tao of Wu, producer RZA points out that Ghostface's voice sounds noticeably different on Ironman from previous Wu-Tang releases. This is because Ironman was released following a flood that destroyed the basement studio in which those recordings were made. RZA had set up individual microphone preamps and compressors for each member, which were destroyed in the flood. Thus, the vocals on Ironman had to be recorded in a different studio with different equipment and settings, which slightly altered their sound.

== Critical reception ==
Professional ratings
Review scores
Source	Rating
AllMusic	4.5/5 stars
Christgau's Consumer Guide	A
Entertainment Weekly	B+
Los Angeles Times	3.5/4 stars
The Philadelphia Inquirer	3.5/4 stars
Pitchfork	9.4/10
Rolling Stone	3.5/5 stars
The Rolling Stone Album Guide	4/5 stars
The Source	4/5 stars
Spin	7/10

In a positive review for The Village Voice, music critic Robert Christgau said that despite morally questionable actions in Ghostface Killah's narratives, "the detail is so vivid and complex that for once we get the gripping blaxploitation flick gangsta [rap] promises rather than the dull or murky one it delivers ... Most decisive of all, RZA's music is every bit as literal as Ghostface's rhymes and rap, giving up tunes, even hooks." Jon Pareles, the chief music critic for The New York Times, wrote in his review of the album, "Anger is just a stimulant for Ghostface Killah. On Ironman he raps about male bonding, the mating game and the violent ups and downs of the drug trade, in a voice raised just above the tone of conversation." Vibe columnist The Blackspot hailed the album as "proof of his matured lyrics and delivery and the Wu's strong family stand. If Only Built 4 Cuban Linx... had you open, prepare for another gaping wound."

In Spin magazine, Chris Norris wrote "Ghostface wreaks havoc with meaning and narrator reliability, flitting from gangster-film intrigue to grimly prosaic reality." Norris also praised RZA's production, stating "As usual, the Wu's sonic auteur provide awesomely dark and eccentric backdrops for the MC's dark maneuvers, mixing soul horns with horror-film keyboards." The Source took note of the album's "intense emotional moments" and stated, "The RZA does another masterful job, topping himself in terms of sonic diversity." Q magazine was less enthusiastic and felt the songs are "more about lyrical finesse than anything else".

In a retrospective review for AllMusic, senior editor Stephen Thomas Erlewine wrote that "the mood of the album can switch tones at the drop of the hat. The record is filled with inventive production and rhymes, and ranks as another solid entry in the Wu-Tang legacy." Stephen Thompson from The A.V. Club praised RZA's production, stating "Just as Terminator X was Public Enemy's secret weapon, The RZA is The Wu-Tang Clan's. Producer RZA, quietly working behind the scenes, has been the force behind Wu-Tang's raw, all over the map, Bruce Lee-meets-Gladys Knight sound. RZA has done it again on Ghostface Killah's Ironman." Thompson further stated "Attacking from all angles, Ironman is classic Wu-Tang, piecing together something unpredictable and vital-sounding."

=== Accolades ===
- (*) signifies unordered lists

Publication	Country	Accolade	Year	Rank
About.com	United States	100 Greatest Hip-Hop Albums	2008	34
About.com	United States	Best Rap Albums of 1996	2008	4
Face	United Kingdom	Albums of the Year	1996	9
The Guardian	United Kingdom	1000 Albums to Hear Before You Die	2007	*
Hip Hop Connection	United Kingdom	The 100 Greatest Rap Albums 1995–2005	2006	36
NME	United Kingdom	Albums of the Year	1996	29
OOR	Netherlands	Albums of the Year	1996	25
Spex	Germany	Albums of the Year	1996	43
Vibe	United States	150 Albums That Define the Vibe Era (1992–2007)	2007	*
Vox	United Kingdom	Albums of the Year	1996	34
The Wire	United Kingdom	Albums of the Year	1996	*

== Commercial performance ==
The album debuted at number two on the Billboard 200 and on the Top R&B/Hip-Hop Albums charts selling 156,000 copies in its first week. The album went on to be certified platinum by the Recording Industry Association of America for sales of over a million copies in the United States. This remains Ghostface Killah's best selling album. In Canada, the album peaked at number four on the Canadian Albums Charts and was certified gold for denoting sales of over 40,000 copies.

== Track listing ==
All tracks produced by RZA, except where noted.

Ironman
No.	Title	Writer(s)	Length
1.	"Iron Maiden" (featuring Raekwon & Cappadonna)	Dennis Coles; Robert Diggs; Corey Woods; Darryl Hill; Carl Smith; Dee Oliver	4:46
2.	"Wildflower"	Coles; Diggs	3:26
3.	"The Faster Blade" (featuring Raekwon)	Diggs; Woods	2:27
4.	"260" (featuring Raekwon)	Coles; Diggs; Woods	2:46
5.	"Assassination Day" (featuring Raekwon, Inspectah Deck & RZA)	Coles; Diggs; Woods; Elgin Turner; Jason Hunter	4:18
6.	"Poisonous Darts"	Coles; Diggs	2:15
7.	"Winter Warz" (featuring Cappadonna, Masta Killa, Raekwon & U-God (previously featured on Don't Be a Menace to South Central While Drinking Your Juice in the Hood soundtrack))	Coles; Diggs; Woods; Hill; Turner; Lamont Hawkins	4:40
8.	"Box In Hand" (featuring Method Man and Streetlife)	Coles; Diggs; Clifford Smith, Jr.; Patrick Charles	3:14
9.	"Fish" (featuring Raekwon & Cappadonna; produced by True Master)	Coles; Woods; Hill; Derrick Harris	3:50
10.	"Camay" (featuring Raekwon & Cappadonna)	Coles; Diggs; Woods; Hill; Ken Hirsch; Ron Miller	4:34
11.	"Daytona 500" (featuring Raekwon & Cappadonna)	Coles; Diggs; Woods; Hill; Bob James	4:40
12.	"Motherless Child" (featuring Raekwon (previously featured on Sunset Park soundtrack))	Coles; Diggs; Woods; Earl Randle; James Shaw	3:45
13.	"Black Jesus" (featuring Raekwon & U-God)	Coles; Diggs; Woods; Hawkins	4:37
14.	"After The Smoke Is Clear" (featuring the Delfonics)	Coles; Diggs	3:17
15.	"All That I Got Is You" (featuring Mary J. Blige)	Coles; Diggs; Mary Blige; Alphonso Mizell; Berry Gordy; Deke Richards; Freddie Perren	5:21
16.	"The Soul Controller" (featuring Force MDs)	Coles; Diggs	6:50
17.	"Marvel" (featuring RZA)	Coles; Diggs	5:10
Total length:			64:48

25th Anniversary bonus track
No.	Title	Writer(s)	Producer(s)	Length
17.	"All That I Got Is You (Remix)" (featuring Mary J. Blige)	Coles; Diggs; Blige; Mizell; Gordy; Richards; Perren	RZA	4:05
Total length:				68:53

Notes

- "Assassination Day" features additional raps by Masta Killa.
- "Winter Warz", "Wu-Will Survive"(credited as "Box In Hand") and "After the Smoke Is Clear" feature uncredited raps by Raekwon.
- "Box in Hand” and "Daytona 500" feature uncredited singing by Force MDs.
- "Black Jesus" and "All That I Got Is You" feature uncredited vocals by Popa Wu.
- "After the Smoke Is Clear" and "Marvel" feature uncredited raps by RZA.
- The original "Box in Hand" (featuring Method Man & Street) was replaced (with "Wu-Will Survive") last minute and can be found on other releases, such as Hidden Darts: Special Edition.
- In 2001, "The Soul Controller" was removed from subsequent pressings of the album, due to sample rights not being cleared.
- "Marvel" is a CD only bonus track.
- "The Faster Blade" and "Assassination Day" don't have Ghostface rapping.

Sample credits

- "Iron Maiden" contains a sample of "Gotta Find a New World" by Al Green and dialogue excerpts from the film The Education of Sonny Carson.
- "Wildflower" contains dialogue excerpts from the film J.D.'s Revenge and contains a sample of "Someone" by Johnny Mathis.
- "The Faster Blade" contains samples of "Can't Go No Further and Do No Better" by the Persuaders and "El Rey Y Yo" by los Angeles Negros.
- "260" contains a sample of "You Ought to Be with Me" by Al Green and dialogue excerpts from the film The Education of Sonny Carson.
- "Assassination Day" contains dialogue excerpts from the films The Usual Suspects and Crying Freeman.
- "Poisonous Darts" contains dialogue excerpts from the film Mystery of Chessboxing.
- "Winter Warz" contains samples of "I Think I'd Do It" by Z.Z. Hill and "Midnight Theme" by Manzel.
- "Box in Hand" contains a sample of "Never Can Say Goodbye" by the Jackson Five.
- "Fish" contains a sample of "Change Is Gonna Come" by Otis Redding and dialogue from the film Crying Freeman.
- "Camay" contains a sample of "Can't We Try?" by Teddy Pendergrass.
- "Daytona 500" contains a sample of "Nautilus" by Bob James and "The Lady in My Life" by Michael Jackson.
- "Motherless Child" contains samples of "Motherless Child" and "Into Something (I Can't Shake Loose)" by O.V. Wright.
- "Black Jesus" contains a sample of "Riot" by Blackbyrds.
- "After the Smoke Is Clear" contains a sample of "What Becomes of the Brokenhearted" by Jimmy Ruffin.
- "All That I Got Is You" contains a sample of "Maybe Tomorrow" by the Jackson 5 and dialogue excerpts from the film The Education of Sonny Carson.
- "The Soul Controller" contains a sample of Brandenburg Concerto No. 1 by J.S. Bach, an interpolation of "A Change Is Gonna Come" by Sam Cooke, and dialogue excerpts from the films Carlito's Way and The Usual Suspects.

== Personnel ==
- Ghostface Killah - performer, executive producer
- RZA - producer, performer, executive producer, mixing
- Raekwon - performer
- Cappadonna - performer
- Method Man - performer
- Inspectah Deck - performer
- U-God - performer
- Masta Killa - performer
- Streetlife - performer
- Poppa Wu - performer
- Mary J. Blige - vocals
- The Delphonics - vocals
- Force MD's - vocals
- True Master - arranger, producer, mixing
- Mitchell Diggs - executive producer
- Oli Grant - executive producer
- Steve Neat - mixing
- Michael Levine - photography
- Sophia Chang - photography
- Ron Craudy - design, illustration
- Deborah Mannis-Gardiner - sample clearance
- Tony Black - Audio Engineer, Mixer

== Charts ==
=== Weekly charts ===
Chart performance for Ironman
Chart (1996)	Peak position
Canada Top Albums/CDs (RPM)	4
UK Albums (Official Charts)	38
US Billboard 200	2
US Top R&B/Hip-Hop Albums (Billboard)	1

Chart (2022)	Peak position
German Albums (Offizielle Top 100)	43

=== Year-end charts ===
Chart (1996)	Position
US Top R&B/Hip-Hop Albums (Billboard)	50
Chart (1997)	Position
US Top R&B/Hip-Hop Albums (Billboard)	70

== Certifications ==
Region	Certification	Certified units/sales
Canada (Music Canada)	Gold	50,000^{^}
United Kingdom (BPI)	Silver	60,000^{‡}
United States (RIAA)	Platinum	1,000,000^{^}
^{^} Shipments figures based on certification alone.^{‡} Sales+streaming figures based on certification alone.

== See also ==
- List of number-one R&B albums of 1996 (U.S.)
