= J. Saul Kane =

- Also known as: Depth Charge; The Octagon Man
- Born: Jonathan Saul Kane; 26 January 1967
- Origin: London, England
- Died: 12 July 2024 (aged 57)
- Genres: Hip hop; breakbeat hardcore; electronic; trip hop; big beat
- Occupations: Musician; DJ; producer
- Years active: 1989–2024
- Labels: Vinyl Solution; DC Recordings; Electron Industries

Jonathan Saul Kane (26 January 1967 – 12 July 2024) was a British DJ, musician, and producer who released music from 1987 as Depth Charge and The Octagon Man, amongst other aliases. He was involved in the founding of record label Vinyl Solution, as well as owner of his own labels DC Recordings and Electron Industries.

Kane was well known for his pioneering use of samples, particularly from cult films in the martial arts, Spaghetti Western and pornographic genres. He also made tracks celebrating his favourite football team (Brazil on the 1990 single "Goal") and player (on the 1998 single "Romário"). Kane was often credited with inventing "trip hop" and "big beat"; he used kung-fu film samples before Wu-Tang Clan. His other aliases include Alexander's Dark Band, T.E.T and Grimm Death.

As a confirmed kung-fu film fan, Kane was involved in setting up the company Made in Hong Kong, which licensed Chinese movies, particularly those made by the Shaw Brothers. Many of these films are examples of the heroic bloodshed genre (The Killer, A Moment of Romance). Made in Hong Kong was the first company to release Stephen Chow films on VHS in the UK.

Although news of his death was not publicised until November 2024, Kane died on 12 July 2024, at the age of 57 from complications of diabetes and multiple sclerosis.

== Discography ==
=== as Depth Charge ===
==== Albums ====
- 9 Deadly Venoms (Vinyl Solution, 1994)
- Lust / Lust 2 (DC Recordings, 1999)
- Spill - Rare & Unreleased Tracks 1993-1998 (DC Recordings, 2002)

==== Notable singles ====
- "Depth Charge / Bounty Killers" (Vinyl Solution, 1989) (Bounty Killers reached UK No. 84)
- "Goal / Dead By Dawn" (Vinyl Solution, 1990)
- "Depth Charge vs. Silver Fox" (Vinyl Solution, 1991)
- "Bounty Killer II" (Vinyl Solution, 1992)
- "Hubba Hubba Hubba" (Vinyl Solution, 1994)
- "Legend of the Golden Snake EP / Shaolin Buddha Finger" (DC Recordings, 1995) (UK No. 75)
- "Sex, Sluts and Heaven" (R&S Records, 1996)
- "Disko Vixen / Alien / Airlines" (DC Recordings, 1997)
- "Romario / Blue Lipps" (DC Recordings, 1998)
- "Bounty Killer 3" (DC Recordings, 1999)
- "The Goblin" (DC Recordings, 2000)
- "I Dream (Depth Charge Vs. The Octagon Man)" (DC Recordings, 2003)
- "Mecha Squirrel" (DC Recordings, 2009)

=== as The Octagon Man ===
==== Albums ====
- The Exciting World of the Octagon Man (Electron Industries, 1995)
- Ito Calculus (DC Recordings, 2000)
- Magneton (DC Recordings, 2003)

==== Notable singles ====
- "Free-er Than Free" (Vinyl Solution, 1989)
- "The Demented Spirit" (Vinyl Solution, 1990)
- "Biting the Dragon's Tail" (Electron Industries, 1995)
- "The Rimm / Phonic Maze" (Electron Industries, 1996)
- "10ft Flowers" (Electron Industries, 1997)
- "Vidd / Zedd" (Electron Industries, 1998)
- "Toy Boxx (The Octagon Man vs. Depth Charge)" (DC Recordings, 2000)

=== Notable remixes ===
- Eon – "Spice" (Vinyl Solution, 1990)
- S'Express – "Nothing To Lose" (Rhythm King, 1990)
- Bomb The Bass – Winter In July" (Rhythm King, 1991)
- Midi Rain – "Shine" (Vinyl Solution, 1992)
