= Nine Deadly Venoms =

Studio album by Depth Charge
- Released: 1994
- Genre: Trip hop
- Length: 45:08
- Label: Vinyl Solution
- Producer: J. Saul Kane

Depth Charge chronology
Nine Deadly Venoms (1994)	Lust (1999)

Professional ratings
Review scores
Source	Rating
AllMusic	4/5 stars
Select	5/5

Nine Deadly Venoms is the debut album by British music producer Jonathan Saul Kane, released in 1994 under his stage name Depth Charge. The album compiles several 12" singles released by Kane under the Depth Charge name in the preceding five years. Kane is often cited as a forerunner of trip hop and an influence on labels such as Mo' Wax and Ninja Tune. The tracks on the album comprise instrumental hip hop beats with dialogue and musical samples from films, particularly martial arts movies, westerns and horror films.

On the CD version of the album, tracks 2, 3, 4, 6 & 8 are edits of the original 12" versions. Some sources have claimed that the longer, original 12" versions appear on the vinyl release of the album. However, this is not the case. Initial copies of the CD version came with a bonus disc featuring extra tracks from the Hubba Hubba Hubba EP.

== Track listing ==
1. "Shaolin Buddha Finger" – 6:47
2. "Dead by Dawn" – 5:05
3. "Bounty Killer" – 5:24
4. "Depth Charge" – 5:47
5. "Bastard Swordsman" – 4:39
6. "Bounty Killer II" – 3:50
7. "Daughters of Darkness" – 5:29
8. "Goal" – 3:59
9. "Hubba Hubba Hubba (What's in the Bag Man?)" – 4:11

Limited edition bonus disc

1. "Hubba Hubba Hubba (Knife in the Bag Version)" – 5:46
2. "Number 9" – 5:50
3. "The Guide" – 3:41
