= Supreme Clientele =

Studio album by Ghostface Killah
- Released: February 8, 2000
- Recorded: 1998–1999
- Studios: New York, New York; Miami, Florida
- Genre: Hip-hop
- Length: 64:10
- Labels: Razor Sharp; Epic; Sony
- Producers: Black Moes-Art; The Blaquesmiths; Carlos Bess; Carlos Broady; Choo the Specializt; Hassan; Inspectah Deck; JuJu; Mathematics; RZA

Ghostface Killah chronology
Ironman (1996)	Supreme Clientele (2000)	Bulletproof Wallets (2001)

Wu-Tang Clan solo chronology
Immobilarity (1999)	Supreme Clientele (2000)	The Yin and the Yang (2001)

Singles from Supreme Clientele
- 1. "Mighty Healthy" Released: 1998; 2. "Apollo Kids" Released: December 10, 1999; 3. "Cherchez La Ghost" Released: February 28, 2000

Supreme Clientele is the second studio album by American rapper and Wu-Tang Clan member Ghostface Killah, released on February 8, 2000, by Razor Sharp Records and Epic Records, a division of Sony Music Entertainment. The album showcases Ghostface's signature up-tempo, stream-of-consciousness rhyme style, and features guest appearances from Cappadonna, GZA, Masta Killa, Method Man, Raekwon, Redman, RZA, U-God, and others. It features affiliates of what would become members of Theodore Unit and T.M.F. Supreme Clientele contains a large amount of production from group member RZA, who also re-worked and remixed beats from other producers involved, as a means to create a unified and cohesive sound for the album.

Upon its release, Supreme Clientele debuted at number seven on the Billboard 200 chart and number two on the Top R&B/Hip-Hop Albums chart, while selling 134,000 copies in its first week. On March 8, 2000, it was certified Gold in sales by the Recording Industry Association of America (RIAA). The album featured the singles "Apollo Kids" and "Cherchez La Ghost", which, despite receiving limited airplay, went on to achieve notable chart success.

Supreme Clientele was met with mostly strong reviews from music critics, despite its contrasting sound and style to that of his previous album, Ironman (1996). It was praised and noted for Ghostface Killah's obscure and creative lyricism, and for the cohesive format of production. Supreme Clientele was the most acclaimed of all the second generation Wu-Tang projects, and featured the most contributions from RZA during this era. Along with Ironman and Fishscale (2006), it is often ranked as Ghostface Killah's best work. It has also been regarded as one of the best solo Wu-Tang albums, and has received accolades for being one of the best albums of the 2000s. In 2020, it was ranked number 403 on Rolling Stone's list of the 500 Greatest Albums of All Time.

== Background and recording ==
After the release of Wu-Tang Clan's second album Wu-Tang Forever (1997), group leader RZA assigned the members to work primarily with affiliate producers on their up-coming solo projects, while he "called dibbs" on Ghostface Killah. RZA also instructed the members to keep Wu-Tang guest appearances to a minimum, as he saw their earlier solo albums as "giving away Wu-Tang to labels who had only signed one member". Although RZA would work occasionally with other group members and affiliates during this time, Supreme Clientele would be the Wu-Tang related project he was most involved in since Wu-Tang Forever.

Recording for the album began in 1998, and took place at several studios in New York and Florida. These sessions, however, would be interrupted due to Ghostface Killah serving a prison sentence at Riker's Island for a 1995 charge he got at the Palladium nightclub in New York. Although Ghostface was in prison for six months, he still had a weapons charge that was pending when he and RZA got back to finishing the remainder of the album.

== Composition ==
=== Lyrics ===
In late 1997, Ghostface Killah and producer RZA took a several month long trip to Africa, where a large portion of Supreme Clientele's lyrics would be written. While in Africa, the culture had an effect on Ghostface's writing. Unlike his acclaimed lyricism on his debut album Ironman, and Raekwon's Only Built 4 Cuban Linx..., Ghostface rarely makes references to crime and materialism on Supreme Clientele. He explained "Fuck all this Tommy Hilfiger, Polo, all that shit. They don't give a fuck about none of that in Africa. Everything is the same. But over here, everybody wanna be better than the next one. Nah, it's not like that over there. They might be fucked-up money wise, but trust me, them muthafuckas is happy. They got each other".

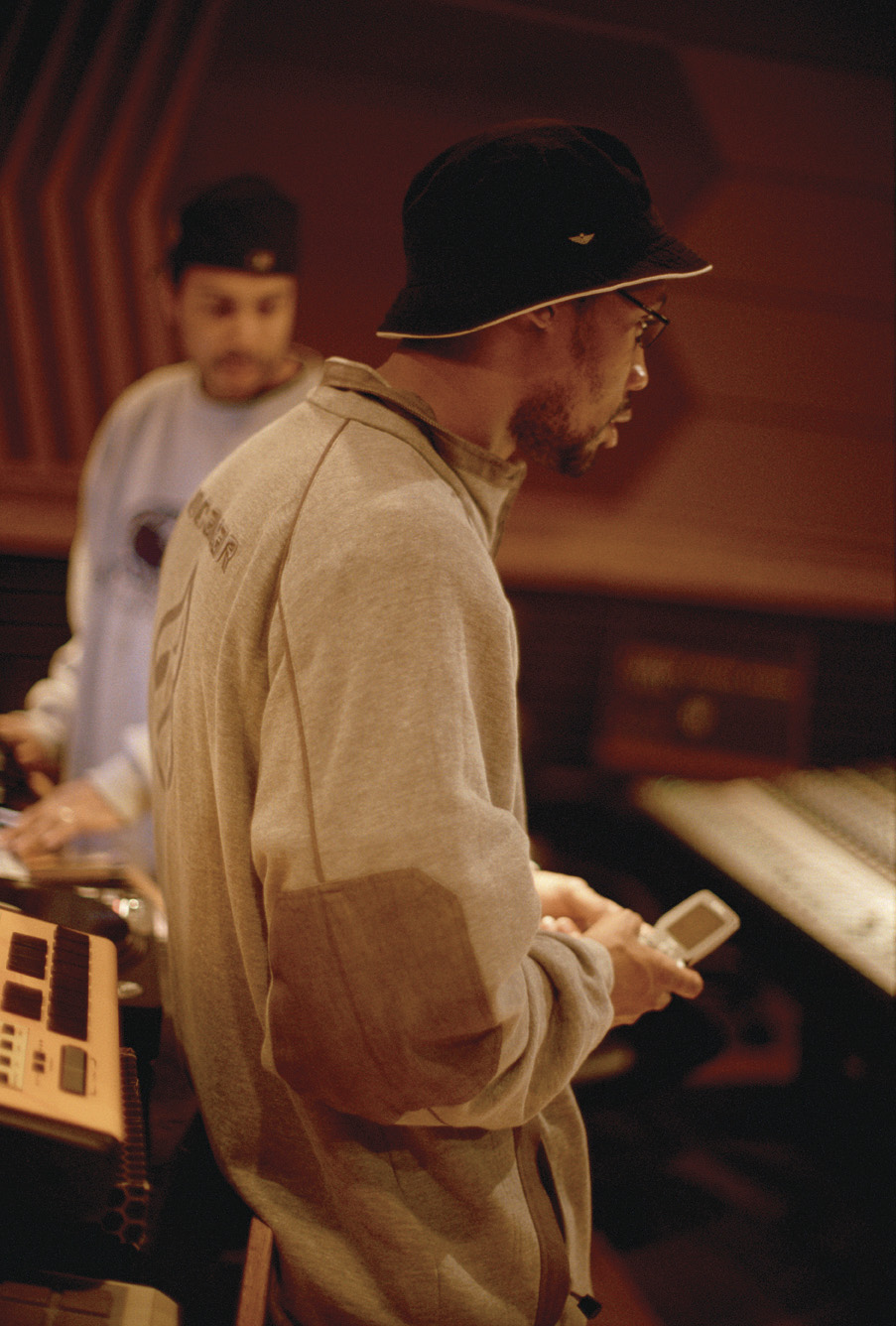
RZA (pictured in 2001) began recording sessions with Ghostface Killah in 1998.

One of the earliest lyrics Ghostface wrote while in Africa was "Nutmeg", a song with a rhythmic, off-beat cadence. Regarding the song's form, he stated "That's a wild song. That shit's one of the illest styles I ever came up with, because I had no music to write to".

=== Production ===
"Apollo Kids"
The second single is a boom bap track produced by Hassan, and features a sample of "Solomon Burke", from the soundtrack of the film Cool Breeze.

In the mid-1990s, Producer RZA had a flood in his basement studio, which resulted in the loss of recording equipment and several hundred beats, many of which were unfinished. As a result, he would have to use new equipment, and completely start over for production contributions. In a later interview, he stated "The jewel of the whole shit is that I lost mad shit in that flood. I got it again. It took me about two years, but I got now at least 200–300 beats. I studied the music, I studied the books and I said 'fuck that. Hip-hop is gonna be able to be played in Carnegie Hall. Not with a DAT, but with a 10-piece orchestra, and have a turntable in it, and Bobby Digital right there in the middle'. "

Although a number of producers, such as JuJu from The Beatnuts, Hassan of the U.M.C.'s, The Hitmen and several Wu-Tang affiliates are credited for production, RZA and Ghostface Killah did the majority of the production and mixing for Supreme Clientele, as they "re-compiled" and "re-worked" the album's beats. RZA explained "Usually a producer comes in, makes a beat, mixes it, and gives the direction for it. But not with this album. That's why you get that special sound. I just needle and threaded the beats all together." This approach would result in critical praise for its fluidity and cohesiveness.

== Controversy ==
Supreme Clientele contains an insult toward then-up-and-coming rapper 50 Cent. In the "Clyde Smith" skit, Wu-tang member Raekwon, with the use of voice distortion, plays the role of a man named Clyde Smith. Clyde Smith addresses 50 Cent and his 1999 song "How to Rob", in which 50 Cent rhymed about how he would rob many popular recording artists, including several members from Wu-Tang Clan. The skit drew a response from 50 Cent, who later replied in an underground mixtape.

In 2004, Lord Superb, formerly of Raekwon's American Cream Team and a collaborator of Ghostface's, made claims that he had "ghostwritten" the entire album of Supreme Clientele. Tony Yayo of G-Unit would later bring the topic back to the surface in 2006. However, in an interview with Rhapsody Music, Ghostface responded with "Yeah, I was in Europe when I heard Tony Yayo say that. That's just nonsense. I still put mad shit out. 'Perb (Superb) is Rae's (Raekwon) man. He been in the studio a few times while we're doing shit. He ain't write shit. All 'Perb contributed was a couple of lines that you could put in the air. When we write, we all do that. "Say this one right here" or "Put this one right here". We all catch lines with each other 'cause you in the studio. You got niggas around you that write. Even if he did write a verse, he could never make an album of mine. He couldn't make an album, you feel me? I made Supreme Clientele what it is. Those are my stories, based around what they're based upon. It's me. I can't see what songs 'Perb wrote. He ain't write "Mighty Healthy" or "One" or "Apollo Kids" or "Cherchez LaGhost" or "Saturday Nite" or "Malcolm".

== Reception ==
Professional ratings
Review scores
Source	Rating
AllMusic	4.5/5 stars
Chicago Sun-Times	4/4 stars
Entertainment Weekly	C
Melody Maker	4/5 stars
NME	7/10
Pitchfork	10/10
Q	4/5 stars
Rolling Stone	3.5/5 stars
The Rolling Stone Album Guide	4/5 stars
The Village Voice	A−

Upon its release, Supreme Clientele received critical acclaim, with several critics lauding it as a return to form for the Wu-Tang Clan collective following middling reception to other solo releases from Wu-Tang members. Vibe critic The Blackspot wrote that, in spite of "speculation of Wu's demise", Ghostface Killah "saves the day with the naysayer-silencing Supreme Clientele. Championing the cause of Wu dominance, Supreme Clientele exemplifies Ghost's lyrical dexterity." M.F. DiBella of AllMusic wrote that Ghostface Killah had avoided the sophomore slump experienced by other Wu-Tang Clan members' second solo releases with Supreme Clientele, which "proves Ghost's worthiness of the Ironman moniker by deftly overcoming trendiness to produce an authentic sound in hip-hop's age of bland parity" and "is a step toward the Wu-Tang Clan's ascent from the ashes of their fallen kingdom." The Source hailed it as being "as entertaining as his debut Ironman" and an "A+ record in Wu fashion ... a Wu album in the Wu-est sense."

Chicago Sun-Times critic Kyra Kyles wrote that with Supreme Clientele, Ghostface Killah "finally shines on his own", while the Alternative Press wrote that the album "shows and proves a minutely detailed, if largely abstract, document of a unique black artist's emotional life." Steve Jones of USA Today described Supreme Clientele as a "brooding mix of lyrically dense and sonically diverse tracks." Mike Pace of PopMatters felt that "the hype surrounding Ghostface's latest Supreme Clientele is well deserved, seeing as that the majority of the tracks deliver like the Mailman Karl Malone doesn't on Sunday", and that despite the presence of some overlong skits, "the album is chockfull of spit-polished Wu-isms and catchy-as-hell beats." In contrast, Craig Seymour from Entertainment Weekly wrote negatively of its skits and long length. Nick Catucci, in a retrospective review for The New Rolling Stone Album Guide, stated that Supreme Clientele showcases Ghostface Killah as "a slightly more self-conscious storyteller swinging from skyscraper-size hooks."

Comedian Chris Rock has called Supreme Clientele one of his favorite albums, praising the track "Stroke of Death" in particular, stating that "it makes you want to stab your babysitter". In 2020, it was ranked number 403 on Rolling Stone's list of "The 500 Greatest Albums of All Time".

== Track listing ==
- Credits adapted from the album's liner notes.

Supreme Clientele track listing
No.	Title	Writer(s)	Producer(s)	Length
1.	"Intro"	Robert Diggs; Jack Urbont	RZA	0:46
2.	"Nutmeg" (featuring RZA)	Dennis Coles; Diggs; Arthur Wilson; Tyrone Kersey; Stephanie Andrews	Black Moes-Art	4:25
3.	"One" (featuring T.M.F.)	Coles; Jerry Tineo; David Porter; Bettye Crutcher; Ronnie Williams	JuJu	3:46
4.	"Saturday Nite"	Coles; Carlos Broady	Carlos "Six July" Broady	1:39
5.	"Ghost Deini" (featuring Superb)	Coles; Mike McDonald; Jamel Cummings	The Blaquesmiths	4:05
6.	"Apollo Kids" (featuring Raekwon)	Coles; Corey Woods; Carlos Evans; Solomon Burke	Haas G	3:54
7.	"The Grain" (featuring RZA)	Coles; Diggs; Eddie Floyd; Bonny Rice; Rufus Thomas, Jr.; Jo Bridges; Tom Nixon	RZA	2:34
8.	"Buck 50" (featuring Cappadonna, Method Man & Redman)	Coles; Darryl Hill; Clifford Smith, Jr.; Reginald Noble; Diggs; Elgin Turner	RZA	4:02
9.	"Mighty Healthy"	Coles; Ronald Bean; Herbert Rooney; Highleigh Crizoe	Mathematics	3:21
10.	"Woodrow the Base Head" (skit)	Coles	RZA	3:04
11.	"Stay True" (featuring 60 Second Assassin)	Coles; Jason Hunter; David Axelrod	Inspectah Deck	1:39
12.	"We Made It" (featuring Superb, Chip Banks and Hell Razah)	Coles; Broady; Jamel Cummings; Earl Randle	Carlos "Six July" Broady	4:37
13.	"Stroke of Death" (featuring Solomon Childs and RZA)	Coles; Diggs; Walbert Dale	RZA	1:56
14.	"Iron's Theme – Intermission"	Coles; Diggs	RZA	1:30
15.	"Malcolm"	Coles; Vance Branch; Anita Poree; Jerry Peters	Choo the Specializt	4:15
16.	"Who Would You Fuck" (skit)	Coles; Diggs	RZA	2:44
17.	"Child's Play"	Coles; Diggs	RZA	3:33
18.	"Cherchez LaGhost" (featuring U-God)	Coles; Lamont Hawkins; Stony Browder; Thomas Browder	Carlos Bess	3:11
19.	"Wu Banga 101" (featuring GZA, Cappadonna, Masta Killa and Raekwon)	Coles; Gary Grice; Hill; Turner; Woods; Bean	Mathematics	4:23
20.	"Clyde Smith" (skit)	Coles; Woods	RZA	2:40
21.	"Iron's Theme – Conclusion"	Coles; Diggs	RZA	1:58
Total length:				64:10

Notes

- The international version of "Ghost Deini" is produced by RZA.

Sample credits

- "Nutmeg" contains a sample from "It's Over", written by Ron Kersey and Stephanie Andrews, performed by Eddie Holman.
- "One" contains a sample from "You Roam When You Don't Get It At Home", written by David Porter, Bettye Crutcher, and Ronnie Williams; performed by Street Inspiration.
- "Apollo Kids" contains a sample from "Cool Breeze", written and performed by Solomon Burke.
- "The Grain" contains samples from:
  - "The Breakdown", written by Eddie Floyd, Bonny Rice, and Rufus Thomas; performed by Rufus Thomas.
  - "Do The Funky Penguin", written by Jo Bridges, Tom Nixon, Mack Rice and Rufus Thomas; performed by Rufus Thomas.
- "Mighty Healthy" contains samples from:
  - "Synthetic Substitution", written and performed by Herb Rooney.
  - "Funky President", written and performed by James Brown.
  - "Nobody Beats The Biz", written by Highleigh Crizoe, performed by Biz Markie.
- "Stay True" contains a sample from "Terri's Tune", written and performed by David Axelrod.
- "We Made It" contains a sample from "I Hate I Walked Away", written by Earl Randle, performed by Syl Johnson.
- "Malcolm" contains a sample from "Going in Circles", written by Anita Poree and Jerry Peters, performed by Isaac Hayes.
- "Cherchez LaGhost" contains an interpolation of "Cherchez LaFemme", written by Stony Browder and August Darnell.

== Personnel ==
=== Performers ===
- Ghostface Killah – performer, arranger, executive producer
- RZA – performer, producer, engineer, executive producer, mixing, arranger
- Raekwon – performer
- Cappadonna – performer
- Method man – performer
- Redman – performer
- GZA – performer
- U-God – performer
- Masta Killa – performer
- 60 Second Assassin – performer
- T.M.F. – performer
- Hell Razah – performer
- Superb – performer
- Chip banks – performer
- Solomon Childs – performer
- The Dramatics – backing vocals
- Raymond Johnson – vocals
- Madam Majestic – vocals
- David Brandon – snare drums
- Dennis Coffey – guitar
- Rudy Robinson – keyboards, rhythm arrangements
- Johnny Allen – string Arrangements

=== Production ===
- Mathematics – producer
- Carlos "6 July" Broady – producer, mixing
- Inspectah Deck – producer
- Juju – producer
- Black Moes-Art – producer
- Choo the Specializt – producer
- Carlos Bess – producer, mixing
- Hassan – producer
- The Blaquesmiths – producer
- Carl Robinson – guitar, string engineer
- Tony Prendatt – engineer, mixing
- Jose "Choco" Reynoso – engineer, mixing
- gabe Chiesa – engineer
- Mike Grayson – engineer
- Nolan "Dr. No" Moffitte – engineer
- Kenny Ortíz – engineer
- Chris Athens – mastering
- Brian Frank – art direction
- John Carr – art direction
- Michael Lavine – photography

== Charts ==
2000 chart performance for Supreme Clientele
Chart (2000)	Peak position
Canadian R&B Albums (Nielsen SoundScan)	4
US Billboard 200	7
US Top R&B/Hip Hop Albums (Billboard)	2

2025 chart performance for Supreme Clientele
Chart (2025)	Peak position
German Albums (Offizielle Top 100)	52

=== Year-end charts ===
Year-end chart performance for Supreme Clientele
Chart (2000)	Peak position
U.S. Billboard 200	199
U.S. Billboard R&B/Hip-Hop Albums	58

== Certifications ==
Region	Certification	Certified units/sales
United States (RIAA)	Gold	500,000^{^}
^{^} Shipments figures based on certification alone.

== Accolades ==
- (*) signifies unordered lists

Publication	Country	Accolade	Year	Rank
Addicted to Noise	United States	Albums of the Year	2000	23
Alternative Press	United States	Albums of the Year	2000	14
The A.V. Club	United States	Top 50 Albums of the 2000s (decade)	2009	28
The Boombox	United States	Top 10 Albums of the 2000s (decade)	2009	3
Cokemachineglow	United States	Top 100 Albums of the 2000s (decade)	2010	2
Complex	United States	The Top 100 Albums of the 2000s (decade)	2009	8
Delusions of Adequacy	United States	Top 100 Albums of the 2000s (decade)	2010	15
FACT	United Kingdom	Top 100 Albums of the 2000s (decade)	2009	83
Hip-Hop Connection	United Kingdom	The 100 Greatest Rap Albums 1995–2005	2006	2
HipHopDX	United States	Top 10 Albums of the 2000s (decade)	2009	*
NME	United Kingdom	Albums of the Year	2000	36
One Thirty BPM	United States	Top 100 Albums of the 2000s (decade)	2010	86
Pitchfork	United States	The 100 Best Albums of 2000–2004	2005	19
Pitchfork	United States	The 200 Best Albums of the 2000s (decade)	2009	11
Playground	Spain	The 200 Best Albums of the 2000s (decade)	2009	10
Porcys	Poland	Top 100 Albums of the 2000s (decade)	2010	65
Rhapsody	United States	Hip-Hop's Best Albums of the Decade	2009	2
Rock de Lux	Spain	The 100 Best Albums of the 2000s (decade)	2009	24
Rolling Stone	United States	Top 25 Hip-Hop Albums Ever (by Chris Rock)	2005	14
Rolling Stone	United States	Top 50 Albums of 2000	2001	*
Rolling Stone	United States	The 500 Greatest Albums of All Time	2020	403
Slant Magazine	United States	Top 250 Albums of the 2000s (decade)	2010	59
Spin	United States	Albums of the Year	2000	11
Stylus Magazine	United States	The 50 Best Albums of 2000–2005	2005	8
Stylus Magazine	United States	Top 101–200 Albums of All time	2004	179
Stylus Magazine	United States	Top 100 Albums of the 2000s (decade)	2010	27
Treble	United States	Top 150 Albums of the 2000s (decade)	2010	82
URB	United States	Top 110 Albums of the 2000s (decade)	2009	*
Vibe	United States	Top 10 Rap Albums	2002	10
The Village Voice	United States	Pazz & Jop	2000	14
The Wire	United Kingdom	50 Records of the Year	2001	*
