= Unleashed (The U.M.C.'s album) =

1994 studio album by the UMC's

Studio album by The UMC's
- Released: January 25, 1994
- Studio: RPM Studios (New York City)
- Genre: Hip hop
- Length: 58:21
- Label: Wild Pitch; EMI

The UMC's chronology
Fruits of Nature (1991)	Unleashed (1994)

Unleashed is the second and final album by the American hip hop group The UMC's. It was released on January 25, 1994 under Wild Pitch Records.

== Critical reception ==
Professional ratings
Review scores
Source	Rating
The Source	3/5 stars

Dimitry Elias Léger, in his review for The Source, commended the group for their lyrical abilities and imagination, but criticized their transition from a softer sound of their debut album to a more aggressive style, saying that they lost their originality. "With their departure from the original lyrics and the mind-expanding grooves [...] they seem to have left their charm and creativity behind", added the journalist.

== Track listing ==
No.	Title	Writer(s)	Length
1.	"Time to Set It Straight"	G, KoolKim	04:18
2.	"We Go"	G, KoolKim	03:49
3.	"Evil Ways"	G, KoolKim	04:11
4.	"Hit the Track"	G, KoolKim	04:09
5.	"What's Up?"	G, Haas, KoolKim	03:24
6.	"Staten Island Comes First"	G, KoolKim	04:24
7.	"Ill Demonic Clique"	G, KoolKim	05:33
8.	"Some Speak Ill Thoughts"	G, KoolKim	04:09
9.	"Whoa Now"	G, Haas, KoolKim	04:06
10.	"Pleasure in the Dark"	G, KoolKim	03:54
11.	"Can You Feel It"	G, Haas, KoolKim	04:05
12.	"How It Gotta Be"	G, KoolKim	04:08
13.	"Gotta Be Sure"	G, KoolKim	04:02
14.	"My Thing"	G, KoolKim	04:16

== Charts ==
Chart (1994)	Peak position
US Heatseekers Albums (Billboard)	22
US Top R&B/Hip-Hop Albums (Billboard)	63
