= Liquid Swords (song) =

1995 single by GZA

Single by GZA

from the album Liquid Swords
- Released: October 10, 1995
- Genre: Hip-hop
- Length: 4:32
- Label: Geffen
- Songwriters: Gary Grice, Robert Diggs, Eddie Brigati, Felix Cavaliere, Joe Zawinul
- Producer: RZA

GZA singles chronology
"I Gotcha' Back" (1994)	"Liquid Swords" (1995)	"Cold World" (1995)

"Liquid Swords" is a song by American rapper and Wu-Tang Clan member GZA. It is the second single and title track of his second studio album (1995). The song contains background vocals from RZA, who also produced the song. It peaked at numbers 48 and 61 on the US Billboard Hot 100 and Cash Box Top 100 charts.

== Background and composition ==
The song opens with sampled dialogue from the film Shogun Assassin. It also samples "Mercy, Mercy, Mercy" and "Groovin'" by Willie Mitchell. In an interview with Wax Poetics, GZA spoke about the song's composition:

This track is just braggadocios. It isn't meant to stand for anything. I'm talking about my skills and how I'm better than the rest. Usually I take a beat home and write to it for a few days, but it wasn't like that with this track. I think RZA played the beat for me and I just spit to it right there. The hook was actually a routine from around '84 that me RZA and Ol' Dirty would do: "When the emcees came, to live out the name." Just like that.

== Track listing ==
=== Side 1 ===
1. "Liquid Swords" (Late night radio)
2. "Liquid Swords" (Clean)
3. "Liquid Swords" (LP version)

=== Side 2 ===
1. "Labels" (Clean)
2. "Labels" (GZA mix)

== Charts ==
Chart (1995)	Peak position
US Billboard Hot 100	48
US Hot R&B/Hip-Hop Songs (Billboard)	33
US Hot Rap Songs (Billboard)	3
US Cash Box Top 100	61
