= Apollo Kids (album) =

Studio album by Ghostface Killah
- Released: December 21, 2010
- Recorded: 2010
- Studios: Red Bull Studios, Starks Studios (Staten Island, New York)
- Genre: Hip hop
- Length: 40:53
- Labels: Starks; Def Jam
- Producers: Sean C & LV; Jake One; Pete Rock; Chino Maurice; Scram Jones; Frank Dukes; Yakub; Big Mizza; Shroom; Anthony Acid

Ghostface Killah chronology
Wu-Massacre (2010)	Apollo Kids (2010)	Wu Block (2012)

Wu-Tang Clan solo chronology
Manifesto (2010)	Apollo Kids (2010)	Shaolin vs. Wu-Tang (2011)

Apollo Kids is the ninth studio album by American rapper and Wu-Tang Clan-member Ghostface Killah, released on December 21, 2010, by Starks Enterprises and Def Jam Recordings. Guests on the album include several Wu-Tang members and affiliates, as well as Redman, Black Thought, Busta Rhymes, Joell Ortiz, and Game, among others.

Apollo Kids is the follow-up to Ghostface's R&B-oriented Ghostdini: Wizard of Poetry in Emerald City (2009) and serves as a return to the characteristic "Wu-Tang Sound". Ghostface Killah recorded the album at Red Bull Studios and Stark Studios in New York City. He conceived it as a mixtape for Def Jam after having partially recorded the Supreme Clientele sequel album and opting not to release that with the label.

Although it only charted at number 120 on the Billboard 200, Apollo Kids received universal acclaim from music critics, who praised its gritty aesthetic and Ghostface Killah's unfiltered rapping.

== Background ==
Ghostface Killah partially recorded the announced sequel album Supreme Clientele Presents... Blue & Cream: The Wally Era near the end of his contract deal with Def Jam Recordings, but after receiving the advance, he instead offered the label Apollo Kids, a lead-in mixtape he subsequently converted into an album, in order to satisfy the contract and shop the sequel album independently. He later said of the exchange with Def Jam in a 2012 interview for Complex:

They wanted Supreme, I’m gassing for them to do Supreme. But I caught them niggas real quick for their bread and then gave them Apollo Kids. That was gonna be called The Warm Up, but they was like, 'Nah, I know what you're trying to do.' They caught on.

Apollo Kids was recorded by Ghostface at Red Bull Studios and Starks Studios in Staten Island, New York.

== Reception ==
Professional ratings
Aggregate scores
Source	Rating
Metacritic	84/100
Review scores
Source	Rating
AllMusic	4/5 stars
The A.V. Club	A−
Consequence of Sound	4.5/5 stars
Entertainment Weekly	A−
Los Angeles Times	3.5/4 stars
Pitchfork	7.3/10
PopMatters	7/10
Rolling Stone	3.5/5 stars
Slant Magazine	4/5 stars
Spin	7/10

The album debuted at number 128 on the US Billboard 200 chart, with first-week sales of 13,000 copies in the United States. It also entered at number 28 on Billboard's R&B/Hip-Hop Albums and at number 10 on its Rap Albums chart.

Apollo Kids received universal acclaim from music critics. At Metacritic, which assigns a normalized rating out of 100 to reviews from mainstream critics, the album received an average score of 84, based on 17 reviews. Allmusic's David Jeffries called it "a return to the grimey soul and stream-of-consciousness street flow of the man’s best work". The A.V. Club's Nathan Rabin stated, "The disc’s tightness, cohesion, and quality are even more surprising: Ghostface hasn’t sounded this hungry or focused since Fishscale [...] At its best, Ghostface’s music is about raw, visceral emotion and unfiltered rage". Entertainment Weekly's Simon Vozick-Levinson viewed it as a timeless addition to Ghostface's catalogue and complimented its "jittery pulp fiction and zany free-associative zingers over scratchy soul, funk, and rock samples". Rolling Stone writer Jonah Weiner stated "On track after track, he blows dust off some dirty-soul loop, with boasts as inspired as ever [...] and street-crime storytelling as vivid as ever". Slant Magazine's Huw Jones complimented the album's "back-to-basics approach" and called it "a compact release that celebrates the staples of vintage rap music and, more specifically, vintage Wu".

David Amidon of PopMatters stated "it feels like a work of boundless energy", but is, "essentially, the safest and most accessible album yet from Ghostface Killah, often hinting at the associative insanity he’s capable of without ever fully taking us there". Pitchfork Media's Ian Cohen noted a "lack of any sort of organizational principle" and commented that "basically arbitrary sequencing never allows too much momentum to build", but commended Ghostface's "harried intensity" and stated "he's still an incredibly ostentatious lyricist, just one that's easier to parse". MSN Music's Robert Christgau gave the album a three-star honorable mention, indicating "an enjoyable effort consumers attuned to its overriding aesthetic or individual vision may well treasure." He cited "In tha Park" and "Purified Thoughts" as highlights and quipped, "Living off his past, but it's quite a past and a damned decent living".

== Track listing ==
Apollo Kids track listing
No.	Title	Writer(s)	Producer(s)	Length
1.	"Purified Thoughts" (featuring GZA and Killah Priest)	Dennis David Coles; Gary Eldridge Grice; Walter Reed	Frank Dukes	3:30
2.	"Superstar" (featuring Busta Rhymes)	Coles; Trevor George Smith Jr.; Tim Schoegje; Roy Ayers; Myrna Williams	Shroom	3:08
3.	"Black Tequila" (featuring Cappadonna and Trife Diesel)	Coles; Darryl Hill; Theo Bailey; Adam King Feeney; Anand Bakshi; Laxmikant Shantaram Kudalkar; Pyarelal Ramprasad Sharma	Frank Dukes	3:43
4.	"Drama" (featuring Joell Ortiz and Game)	Coles; Joell Christopher Ortiz; Jayceon Terrell Taylor; Deleno Matthews; Levar Coppin	Sean C & LV	4:28
5.	"2getha Baby"	Coles; Jacob Osborne; Kenneth Gamble; Leon Huff	Yakub	3:01
6.	"Starkology"	Coles; Marc Shemer; David Matthews	Scram Jones	2:25
7.	"In tha Park" (featuring Black Thought)	Coles; Tariq Luqmaan Trotter; Feeney; Thomas Gregory Jackson; Peter Lucia Junior	Frank Dukes	3:47
8.	"How You Like Me Baby"	Coles; Peter Phillips; John Cameron; John Zachary	Pete Rock	3:14
9.	"Handcuffin' Them Hoes" (featuring Jim Jones)	Coles; Joseph Guillermo Jones II; Steven Chino Lewis	Chino Maurice	2:30
10.	"Street Bullies" (featuring Sheek Louch, Shawn Wiggs and Sun God)	Coles; Sean Divine Jacobs; Dennis Ames; David Jordan; Quint Fickling; Shearin Ramsey	Big Mizza	3:17
11.	"Ghetto" (featuring Raekwon, Cappadonna and U-God)	Coles; Corey Woods; Hill; Lamont Jody Hawkins; Anthony Caputo; Marlina Burgess; Roger Dean Miller Sr.; Richard Evans	Anthony Acid	4:09
12.	"Troublemakers" (featuring Raekwon, Method Man & Redman)	Coles; Woods; Clifford Smith, Jr.; Reginald Noble; Jacob Brian Dutton	Jake One	3:40
Total length:				40:53

Sample credits

- "Purified Thoughts" contains samples of "Am I a Good Man", written by Willie Clarke, originally performed by Them Two courtesy of The Numero Group.
- "Superstar" contains samples of the recording "He's a Superstar" as performed by Roy Ayers, written by Roy Ayers and Myrna Williams.
- "Black Tequila" contains samples of the recording "Jogan Ban Gayiu" as performed by Asha Bhosle, written by Anand Bakshi and Pyarelal Laxmikant.
- "2getha Baby" contains samples of "Together" performed by The Intruders, written by Kenneth Gamble and Leon Huff.
- "Starkology" contains excerpts from "Theme from Star Wars" performed by David Matthews, written by David Matthews.
- "In tha Park" contains samples of the recording "I'm Alive" performed by Johnny Thunder, written by Tommy James and Pete Lucia.
- "How You Like Me Baby" contains samples of "Different Strokes", written by John A. Cameron and John Zachary, originally performed by Syl Johnson.
- "Street Bullies" contains samples of the recording "You Are Just a Living Doll" performed by J. J. Barnes, written by David L. Jordan.
- "Ghetto" contains samples of the recording "Woman of the Ghetto" as performed by Marlena Shaw, written by Richard Evans, R. Miller, and Marlena Shaw.

== Personnel ==
Credits for Apollo Kids adapted from Allmusic.

- Anthony "Acid" Caputo – engineer, mixing, producer
- Big Mizza – producer
- Leesa D. Brunson – A&R
- Sean C. – producer
- Munk Le Cinq – fonts
- Dennis Coles – A&R, executive producer
- Tony Dawsey – mastering
- Frank Dukes – mixing, producer
- Javon Greene – A&R
- Joe "Thelonius" Harley – bass, keyboards
- Patrick Hegarty – art direction
- Jake One – producer
- Scram Jones – producer
- Deborah Mannis-Gardner – sample clearance

- Chino Maurice – producer
- Leon Michels – organ
- Mike Caruso – A&R, executive producer, management
- Nick Movshon – drums
- Briana Perkins – marketing
- Antonio "L.A." Reid – executive producer
- Pete Rock – mixing, producer
- Lenny S. – A&R
- Supa Engineer "Dura" – mixing
- Doug Wilson – mixing
- Yakub – producer
- Kristen Yiengst – art coordinator
- Adam Zia – legal counsel

== Charts ==
Chart (2010–2011)	Peak position
US Billboard 200	120
US Billboard R&B/Hip-Hop Albums	28
US Billboard Rap Albums	10
