= Levar Coppin =

American DJ, producer, songwriter

- Also known as: LV, L.V., LeVar, Grind Music
- Genres: Hip-hop; rap; R&B
- Occupations: DJ; producer; songwriter
- Label: Terror Squad Entertainment / Bad Boy Records

Levar Coppin, also known as "LV", is an American DJ, producer, and songwriter, best known for his involvement in production outfit Sean C & LV, which was linked to Fat Joe's New York City-based hip-hop collective Terror Squad, and is presently linked to Bad Boy Records' The Hitmen. Coppin is also known for his production and songwriting contributions to Jay-Z's 2007 album American Gangster and various Ghostface Killah projects, as well as his writing contributions to Beyoncé's 2022 album Renaissance.

== Songwriting and production credits ==
Credits are courtesy of Discogs, Tidal, Apple Music, and AllMusic.

Title	Year	Artist	Album
"Terror Era" (With Remy Ma & Fat Joe)	2004	Terror Squad	True Story
"50 in the Clip"	2004	Dead Prez	RBG: Revolutionary but Gangsta
"Get Your Grind On" (Featuring Big Pun, Fat Joe, & Freeway)	2005	The Notorious B.I.G.	Duets: The Final Chapter
"Temptation Part II"	2005	Fat Joe	All or Nothing
"Intro"	2005	Aasim	The Money Pit
"Money Pit (Problems)"	2005	Aasim	The Money Pit
"Monsta Mash"	2005	Aasim	The Money Pit
"Kool Shit"	2005	Aasim	The Money Pit
"Streets Is Alive"	2005	Aasim	The Money Pit
"Broken Bottles"	2005	Aasim	The Money Pit
"Rhyme Epic"	2005	Aasim	The Money Pit
"Gotta Grind"	2005	Aasim	The Money Pit
"Feel So Good" (Featuring Ne-Yo)	2006	Remy Ma	There's Something About Remy: Based on a True Story
"Bilingual" (Featuring Ivy Queen)	2006	Remy Ma	There's Something About Remy: Based on a True Story
"My Life"	2006	Remy Ma	There's Something About Remy: Based on a True Story
"I Am (Interlude)"	2006	Diddy	Press Play
"Get Off"	2006	Diddy	Press Play
"Laugh Now, Cry Later"	2006	Ice Cube	Laugh Now, Cry Later
"Momma" (Featuring Megan Rochell)	2006	Ghostface Killah	Fishscale
"Pray"	2007	Jay-Z	American Gangster
"American Dreamin'"	2007	Jay-Z	American Gangster
"No Hook"	2007	Jay-Z	American Gangster
"Roc Boys (And the Winner Is)..."	2007	Jay-Z	American Gangster
"Sweet"	2007	Jay-Z	American Gangster
"Party Life"	2007	Jay-Z	American Gangster
"Toney Sigel A.K.A. the Barrel Brothers" (Featuring Beanie Sigel, Styles P & Solomon Childs)	2007	Ghostface Killah	The Big Doe Rehab
"We Celebrate" (Featuring Kid Capri)	2007	Ghostface Killah	The Big Doe Rehab
"I'll Die for You" (Featuring Amille D. Harris)	2007	Ghostface Killah	The Big Doe Rehab
"Paisley Darts" (Featuring Raekwon, Sun God, Trife da God, Method Man & Cappadonna)	2007	Ghostface Killah	The Big Doe Rehab
"Shakey Dog Starring Lolita" (Featuring Raekwon)	2007	Ghostface Killah	The Big Doe Rehab
"Welcome to the Terrordome"	2007	Pharoahe Monch	Desire
"I Won't Tell" (Featuring J. Holiday)	2008	Fat Joe	The Elephant in the Room
"300 Brolic" (Featuring Opera Steve)	2008	Fat Joe	The Elephant in the Room
"Freedom"	2009	Clipse	Til the Casket Drops
"Never Will It Stop" (Featuring Ab-Liva)	2009	Clipse	Til the Casket Drops
"One More Step" (Featuring Styles P)	2009	Jadakiss	The Last Kiss
"I Miss My Love"	2009	Fabolous	Loso's Way
"Welcome to My Workplace"	2009	Fabolous	Loso's Way
"Bang Bang"	2009	Fabolous	Loso's Way
"Lonely" (Featuring Jack Knight)	2009	Ghostface Killah	Ghostdini: Wizard of Poetry in Emerald City
"Stapleton Sex"	2009	Ghostface Killah	Ghostdini: Wizard of Poetry in Emerald City
"Let's Stop Playin'" (Featuring John Legend)	2009	Ghostface Killah	Ghostdini: Wizard of Poetry in Emerald City
"Goner" (Featuring Lloyd)	2009	Ghostface Killah	Ghostdini: Wizard of Poetry in Emerald City
"Be Right"	2009	Wale	Attention Deficit
"Drama" (Featuring Joell Ortiz & Game)	2010	Ghostface Killah	Apollo Kids
"Stomp" (Featuring Greg Porn)	2011	The Roots	Undun
"Rich & Black" (Featuring Nas)	2011	Raekwon	Shaolin vs. Wu-Tang
"Put Some Money on It"	2011	Joell Ortiz	Free Agent
"Put Some Money on It" (remix) (Featuring The Lox)	2011	Slaughterhouse	Slaughterhouse (EP)
"Audio Dope III"	2012	Currensy	The Stoned Immaculate
"Come Here" (Featuring Miguel)	2013	Talib Kweli	Prisoner of Conscious
"The Curse of the Gifted"	2013	Wale	The Gifted
"Ghetto Burbs" (Featuring Emanny)	2013	Joe Budden	No Love Lost
"Facts"	2015	Puff Daddy & The Family	MMM (Money Making Mitch)
"Everyday (Amor)" (Featuring Jadakiss, Styles P, Pusha T & Tish Hyman)	2015	Puff Daddy & The Family	MMM (Money Making Mitch)
"You Could Be My Lover" (Featuring Ty Dolla Sign & Gizzle)	2015	Puff Daddy & The Family	MMM (Money Making Mitch)
"Crutches, Crosses, Caskets"	2015	Pusha T	King Push – Darkest Before Dawn: The Prelude
"I Pray" (Featuring Swizz Beatz)	2017	Fabolous & Jadakiss	Friday on Elm Street
"Good Morning" (Featuring Pusha T, Swizz Beatz & Killer Mike)	2020	Black Thought	Streams of Thought, Vol. 3: Cane & Able
"No Explanation" (Featuring Pusha T)	2020	Joey Badass	The Light Pack
"Alien Superstar"	2022	Beyoncé	Renaissance
"Summer Renaissance"	2022	Beyoncé	Renaissance
"Written in the Stars"	2022	Joey Badass	2000

== Awards and nominations ==
Year	Ceremony	Award	Result	Ref
2023	65th Annual Grammy Awards	Grammy Award for Album of the Year (Renaissance)	Nominated	
