= The Big Doe Rehab =

Studio album by Ghostface Killah
- Released: December 4, 2007
- Recorded: 2007
- Genre: Hip-hop
- Length: 47:55
- Labels: Starks; Def Jam
- Producers: Ant-Live; Anthony Acid; Baby Grand; Davey Chegwidden; Frequency; Ghostface Killah; LV; Sean C; Scram Jones; Syience

Ghostface Killah chronology
More Fish (2006)	The Big Doe Rehab (2007)	Ghostdini: Wizard of Poetry in Emerald City (2009)

Wu-Tang Clan solo chronology
More Fish (2006)	The Big Doe Rehab (2007)	Digi Snacks (2008)

The Big Doe Rehab is the seventh studio album by American rapper and Wu-Tang Clan member Ghostface Killah, released on December 4, 2007 on Starks Enterprises and Def Jam Recordings. The album features guest appearances from fellow Wu-Tang members Raekwon, Method Man, U-God, and Masta Killa as well as from Kid Capri, Cappadonna and members of Ghostface's Theodore Unit crew. The album features production from LV & Sean C. among others.

== Background ==
The album was released on December 4, 2007. This initially conflicted with the release date of Wu-Tang Clan's fifth group album 8 Diagrams, a fact Ghostface was reported to be unhappy with, according to an interview with MTV.com. In response to this, RZA subsequently announced the delay of 8 Diagrams by a further week so as not to clash with the release of The Big Doe Rehab.

While speaking to MTV News in December 2007, Ghostface Killah explained the album title, saying:

"I dreamt I was in rehab, but for [having] mad money. Me and a bunch of old white dudes. Dreams — you can't really remember the dreams — but I was someplace, I don't even know if it was rehab, but it was mad money in there. When I woke up, the first thing that came to my mind was The Big Doe Rehab. I take a list of titles and write them in my rhyme book, which I might use in the future."

== Critical reception ==
Professional ratings
Aggregate scores
Source	Rating
Metacritic	77/100
Review scores
Source	Rating
AllMusic	3/5 stars
The A.V. Club	A
Entertainment Weekly	B+
Los Angeles Times	3/4 stars
Paste	3.5/5 stars
Pitchfork	8.0/10
PopMatters	8/10
Robert Christgau	A−
Rolling Stone	4/5 stars
Slant Magazine	3.5/5 stars

The Big Doe Rehab received generally positive reviews from music critics. At Metacritic, which assigns a normalized rating out of 100 to reviews from critics, the album received an average score of 77, which indicates "generally favorable reviews", based on 29 reviews. Marisa Brown of AllMusic said, "Overall the record lacks the excitement, the originality, and the passion that can and has made Ghostface so compelling. A lot of this, for better or for worse, can be blamed on the production." Dave Hughes of Slant Magazine said, "Ghostface has built one of hip-hop's more reliably satisfying brands out of the sound that predominates on Rehab, and his fans will find a lot to like here. But given that a relevant part of his appeal has always been his eccentricity and willingness to take risks, a record mostly defined by his adherence to the tried and true is bound to feel like a bit of a copout." Matthew Fiander of PopMatters said, "The Big Doe Rehab succeeds because it is an album unafraid to show kinks in its armor. Ghostface is always proud on record, and he holds onto that here, but not without letting us past the pride every once in a while, to see an artist that was always brilliant and full of energy finding just the right amount of focus as he hits what could turn out to be his most furtive years."

Christian Hoard of Rolling Stone said, "The Big Doe Rehab isn't as distinct as last year's Fishscale, but it's close." Eric Lach of Paste said, "While Rehab doesn't represent the top of Ghostface's game, the MC's approach is as viable as ever. And if the album doesn't pack the kind of radio-ready hits provided by this year's other big-time rappers like Kanye West and Jay-Z, it's only because this is one artist with other priorities." Nathan Rabin of The A.V. Club said, "If the title weren't already taken More Fish would be a fitting name for Ghostface's new album, another tour de force from a guy who made history with his Wu-Tang brethren while still in his early twenties and just keeps getting better with age. The Big Doe Rehab feels like a worthy sequel to last year's Fishscale."

== Commercial performance ==
The Big Doe Rehab debuted and peaked at number 41 on the U.S. Billboard 200 chart and sold about 36,000 units in its debut week. Unhappy with the album sales, Ghostface has since posted a video on his MySpace page expressing disappointment in most of his fans for downloading the album illegally and threatened to retire from rapping.

== Track listing ==
Credits adapted from the album's liner notes.

The Big Doe Rehab track listing
No.	Title	Writer(s)	Producer(s)	Length
1.	"At the Cabana Skit" (featuring Rhythm Roots Allstars)	Dennis David Coles; Davey Chegwidden; Ricky Rodriguez; Kevin Wong; Carlos Del Puerto	Davey Chegwidden	1:12
2.	"Toney Sigel A.K.A. the Barrel Brothers" (featuring Beanie Sigel)	Coles; Dwight Equan Grant; Deleno Matthews; Levar Coppin; Ugene Dozier; Phil Hurtt	Sean C & LV	3:01
3.	"Yolanda's House" (featuring Method Man and Raekwon)	Coles; Clifford Smith, Jr.; Corey Woods; Anthony Singleton	Ant Live	3:12
4.	"We Celebrate" (featuring Kid Capri)	Coles; David Anthony Love Jr.; Matthews; Coppin; Dino George Fekaris; Nick Zesses	Sean C & LV	4:13
5.	"Walk Around"	Coles; Anthony Caputo; Bonny Rice; Ora Craig	Anthony Acid	3:32
6.	"Yapp City" (featuring Trife Da God and Sun God)	Coles; Theodore Bailey; Dennis Ames; Marc Shemer	Scram Jones	3:43
7.	"White Linen Affair (Toney Awards)" (featuring Shawn Wigs)	Coles; Bryan Fryzel; Shemer; Paul Kyser	Frequency; Scram Jones ^{[a]}	4:07
8.	"Supa GFK"	Coles; Caputo; John Watson Jr.; Reynaldo Rey	Ghostface Killah; Anthony Acid	3:38
9.	"Rec-Room Therapy" (featuring Raekwon & U-God)	Coles; Woods; Lamont Jody Hawkins; Robert Adair; Chegwidden	Baby Grand; Davey Chegwidden^{[b]}	3:13
10.	"The Prayer Skit" (featuring Ox)	Coles; Dejuan Walker		1:23
11.	"I'll Die for You"	Coles; Matthews; Charles Jackson; Marvin Jerome Yancy	Sean C & LV	3:06
12.	"Paisley Darts" (featuring Raekwon, Sun God, Trife da God, Method Man & Cappadonna)	Coles; Woods; Ames; Bailey; Smith, Jr.; Darryl Hill; Matthews; Coppin; Bobby Miller	Sean C & LV	5:36
13.	"Shakey Dog Starring Lolita" (featuring Raekwon)	Coles; Woods; Matthews; Coppin; Leon Marcus Michels; Nicholas Movshan; Todd Simon	Sean C & LV	3:09
14.	"! Skit" (featuring Rhythm Roots Allstars)	Coles; Chegwidden; Rodriguez; Wong; Del Puerto	Davey Chegwidden	0:36
15.	"Killa Lipstick" (featuring Method Man & Masta Killa)	Coles; Smith, Jr.; Jamel Irief; Caputo; Ralph Aikens; Tyrone Crum; Keith Harrison; Robert Neal; Roger Parker; Clarence Satchell	Ghostface Killah; Anthony Acid	3:38
16.	"Slow Down" (featuring Chrisette Michele)	Coles; Chrisette Michele Payne; Reginald Perry	Syience	2:36
Total length:				50:02

Expanded Edition bonus track
No.	Title	Writer(s)	Producer(s)	Length
17.	"Clothes Off!" (Stress Remix; Gym Class Heroes featuring Tyga and Ghostface Killah)	Travis Lazarus McCoy; Preston Glass; Narada Michael Walden	Patrick Stump; S*A*M & Sluggo	4:28
Total length:				54:30

Notes

- ^{^[a]} signifies a co-producer
- ^{^[b]} signifies an additional producer

Sample credits

- "Toney Sigel A.K.A. the Barrel Brothers" contains a sample of "Fallin' in Love With You", written by Ugene Dozier and Phil Hurtt, as performed by Al Wilson.
- "We Celebrate" contains a sample of "I Just Want to Celebrate", written by Dino Fekaris and Nickolas Zesses, as performed by Rare Earth.
- "Walk Around" contains a sample of "Packed Up and Took My Mind", written by Ora Craig and Mack Rice, as performed by Little Milton.
- "White Linen Affair (Toney Awards)" contains a sample of "That's the Way It's Got to Be (Body and Soul)", written by Paul Kyser, as performed by Soul Generation.
- "Supa GFK" contains a sample of "Superman Lover", written by Johnny "Guitar" Watson and Reynaldo Rey, as performed by Johnny "Guitar" Watson.
- "I'll Die for You" contains a sample of "It's All Over", written by Charles Jackson and Marvin Yancy, as performed by The Independents.
- "Paisley Darts" contains a sample of "Lie No. 2", written by Bobby Miller, as performed by The Originals.
- "Shakey Dog Starring Lolita" contains a sample of "Musings to Myself", written by Leon Michels, Nicholas Movshan, and Todd Smion, as performed by El Michels Affair.
- "Killa Lipstick" contains a sample of "Riding High", written by Ralph Aikens, Tyrone Crum, Keith Harrison, Robert Neal, Roger Parker, and Clarence Satchell, as performed by Faze-O.

== Charts ==
=== Weekly charts ===
Chart (2007)	Peak position
US Billboard 200	41
US Top R&B/Hip-Hop Albums (Billboard)	8
US Top Rap Albums (Billboard)	5

=== Year-end charts ===
Chart (2008)	Position
US Top R&B/Hip-Hop Albums (Billboard)	94
