= Sean C =

American record producer

Deleno Matthews, known professionally as Sean C (originally Sean Cane), is an American producer, DJ and "artists and repertoire" (A&R) specialist. Sean is a member of production duo Sean C & LV (Grind Music) which is affiliated with Sean Combs' Hitmen producers.

As a DJ, Sean C co-founded the New York DJ crew The X-Men (renamed The X-Ecutioners) Sean worked as an A&R for Steve Rifkind's Loud Records and SRC Records imprints. He is credited as A&R and executive producer for Mobb Deep, Dead Prez, Big Pun, Terror Squad, Remy Ma and The X-Ecutioners. Sean C has produced songs for Jay-Z, Big Pun, Jadakiss among others. He was nominated for best rap album Grammy awards for Jay Z's American Gangster and for Big Pun's debut Capital Punishment.

== Discography ==
Year	Album	Song and artist(s)
1996	Reasonable Doubt	"Can't Knock the Hustle" (Jay-Z featuring Mary J. Blige)
1997	X-Pressions	"Raida's Theme" (The X-Ecutioners featuring E Bros)
1998	The Rude Awakening	"Won On Won" (Cocoa Brovaz)
2000	Yeeeah Baby	"100%" (Big Pun featuring Tony Sunshine)
2001	Endangered Species	"Freestyle with Remy Martin" (Big Pun featuring Remy Ma)
2001	24K	"Toe to Toe" (Cuban Link featuring Big Pun)
2001	Jealous Ones Still Envy (J.O.S.E.)	"Intro" (Fat Joe)
2001	Jealous Ones Still Envy (J.O.S.E.)	"It's O.K." (Fat Joe)
2001	Child of the Ghetto	"Keep It Gangsta" (G. Dep featuring Shyne)
2001	Child of the Ghetto	"It's All Over" (G. Dep featuring Carl Thomas)
2002	Built from Scratch	"B-Boy Punk Rock 2001" (The X-Ecutioners featuring Everlast)
2002	Built from Scratch	"Dramacyde" (The X-Ecutioners featuring Big Pun & Kool G Rap)
2002	Reanimation	"X-Ecutioner Style" (Linkin Park featuring Sean C, Roc Raida & Black Thought)
2004	RBG: Revolutionary but Gangsta	"Radio Freq" (Dead Prez featuring Sean C)
2004	RBG: Revolutionary but Gangsta	"50 in the Clip" (Dead Prez featuring Wu Hylton)
2004	The Piece Maker 2	"Touch 1, Touch All" (Tony Touch featuring Dead Prez)
2004	Revolutions	"Old School Throwdown" (The X-Ecutioners)
2004	Revolutions	"The Truth" (The X-Ecutioners featuring Aasim and Fat Joe)
2004	Straight Outta Cashville	"Black Gloves" (Young Buck)
2005	All or Nothing	"Temptation, Part. II"^{A} (Fat Joe)
2005	Duets: The Final Chapter	"Get Your Grind On" (The Notorious B.I.G. featuring Big Pun, Fat Joe and Freeway)
2006	Press Play	"I Am" (Diddy featuring Aasim)
2006	Fishscale	"Momma" (Ghostface Killah featuring Megan Rochell)
2006	Laugh Now, Cry Later	"Laugh Now, Cry Later" (Ice Cube)
2006	There's Something About Remy: Based on a True Story	"Feel So Good"^{A} (Remy Ma featuring Ne-Yo)
2006	There's Something About Remy: Based on a True Story	"Bilingual"^{A} (Remy Ma featuring Ivy Queen)
2006	There's Something About Remy: Based on a True Story	"Guilty" (Remy Ma)
2007	The Big Doe Rehab	"Toney Sigel A.K.A. the Barrel Brothers" (Ghostface Killah featuring Beanie Sigel, Styles P and Solomon Childs)
2007	The Big Doe Rehab	"We Celebrate" (Ghostface Killah featuring Kid Capri)
2007	The Big Doe Rehab	"I'll Die for You" (Ghostface Killah)
2007	The Big Doe Rehab	"Paisley Darts" (Ghostface Killah featuring Raekwon, Sun God, Trife Da God, Method Man and Cappadonna)
2007	The Big Doe Rehab	"Shakey Dog Starring Lolita" Ghostface Killah featuring Raekwon)
2007	American Gangster	"Pray" (Jay-Z)
2007	American Gangster	"American Dreamin'" (Jay-Z)
2007	American Gangster	"No Hook" (Jay-Z)
2007	American Gangster	"Roc Boys (And the Winner Is)..." (Jay-Z)
2007	American Gangster	"Sweet" (Jay-Z)
2007	American Gangster	"Party Life" (Jay-Z)
2007	Desire	"Welcome to the Terrordome" (Pharoahe Monch)
2008	The Elephant in the Room	"I Won't Tell" (Fat Joe featuring J. Holiday)
2008	The Elephant in the Room	"300 Brolic" (Fat Joe featuring Opera Steve)
2008	Joe Crack & Pistol Pete Present: K.A.R.	"Oh Baby" (K.A.R. featuring Fat Joe)
2008	—N/a	"Don't Touch Me (Throw da Water on 'Em)" (Busta Rhymes)
2009	Til the Casket Drops	"Freedom" (Clipse)
2009	Til the Casket Drops	"Never Will It Stop" (Clipse featuring Ab-Liva)
2009	Loso's Way	"I Miss My Love" (Fabolous)
2009	Loso's Way	"Welcome to My Workplace" (Fabolous)
2009	Loso's Way	"Bang Bang" (Fabolous)
2009	The Last Kiss	"One More Step" (Jadakiss featuring Styles P)
2009	Ghostdini: Wizard of Poetry in Emerald City	"Lonely" (Ghostface Killah featuring Jack Knight)
2009	Ghostdini: Wizard of Poetry in Emerald City	"Stapleton Sex" (Ghostface Killah )
2009	Ghostdini: Wizard of Poetry in Emerald City	"Let's Stop Playin'" (Ghostface Killah featuring John Legend)
2009	Ghostdini: Wizard of Poetry in Emerald City	"Goner" (Ghostface Killah featuring Lloyd)
2010	Apollo Kids	"Drama" (Ghostface Killah featuring Joell Ortiz and Game)
2011	Free Agent	"Put Some Money on It" (Joell Ortiz featuring The LOX)
2011	Shaolin vs. Wu-Tang	"Rich & Black" (Raekwon featuring Nas)
2011	Undun	"Stomp" (The Roots featuring Greg Porn and Just Blaze)
2012	The Stoned Immaculate	"Audio Dope III" (Curren$y)
2013	Prisoner of Conscious	"Come Here" (Talib Kweli featuring Miguel)
2013	The Gifted	"The Curse of the Gifted" (Wale)
2014	Loud Dreams	“Hand in My Pocket” (Sean C & LV featuring Pusha T and Asap Ferg)
2014	Loud Dreams	“Bus Stop” (Sean C & LV featuring Busta Rhymes) (Uses Por Temor by Los Galos)
2014	Loud Dreams	“Tomorrow May Never Come” (Sean C & LV featuring Asap 12vy, Styles P and Chauncy Sherrod)
2014	Loud Dreams	“Live For Today” (Sean C & LV featuring Jadakiss, Bun B, Fabolous, Rob Zoe & Anthiny King)
2014	Loud Dreams	“Get My Money Up” (Sean C & LV featuring Tree, Bun B, J Ivy & 100s)
2014	Loud Dreams	“Where’s Your Leader” (Sean C & LV featuring Prodigy, Bun B, Remy Banks, & Chauncy Sherrod)
2014	Loud Dreams	“Break Fruit” (Sean C & LV featuring Raekwon)
2014	Loud Dreams	“Burn It Down” (Sean C & LV featuring Devin the Dude, Asher Roth, Smoke Dza, & Hypnotic Brass)
2014		“Look at us” (Sean C & LV Smoke Dza, Dom Kennedy, & Big K.R.I.T.)
2015	MMM	“Facts” (Puff Daddy and the Family)
2015	MMM	“Help Me” (Puff Daddy and the Family featuring Sevyn Streeter)
2015	MMM	“Everyday” (Puff Daddy and the Family featuring Jadakiss, Styles P and Pusha T)
2015	MMM	“Be My Lover" (Puff Daddy and the Family featuring Gizzle and Ty Dolla $ign)
2015	Darkest Before The Dawn	“Crutches, Crosses and Caskets” (Pusha T)
2017	Friday on Elm Street	“I Pray” (Fabolous and Jadakiss featuring Swizz Beatz)
2018	Underground	“Temperature” (Marco Mckinnis)
2020	Alicia	“Jill Scott” (Alicia Keys featuring Jill Scott)
2020	The Light Pack	“No Explanation” (Joey Bada$$ featuring Pusha T)
2020	Talk About It	“Sacred”
2020	Streams of Thought, Vol. 3: Cane & Able	"I’m Not Crazy (First Contact)" (Black Thought)
2020	Streams of Thought, Vol. 3: Cane & Able	"State Prisoner" (Black Thought)
2020	Streams of Thought, Vol. 3: Cane & Able	"Good Morning" (Black Thought featuring Swizz Beatz, Pusha T, Killer Mike)
2020	Streams of Thought, Vol. 3: Cane & Able	"Magnificent" (Black Thought)
2020	Streams of Thought, Vol. 3: Cane & Able	"Experience" (Interlude) (Black Thought)
2020	Streams of Thought, Vol. 3: Cane & Able	"Quiet Trip" (Black Thought featuring Portugal. The Man & The Last Artful, Dodgr)
2020	Streams of Thought, Vol. 3: Cane & Able	"Nature Of The Beast" (Black Thought featuring Portugal. The Man & The Last Artful, Dodgr)
2020	Streams of Thought, Vol. 3: Cane & Able	"We Should Be Good" (Black Thought featuring CS Armstrong)
2020	Streams of Thought, Vol. 3: Cane & Able	"Steak Um" (Black Thought featuring Schoolboy Q)
2020	Streams of Thought, Vol. 3: Cane & Able	"Thought Vs. Everybody" (Black Thought)
2020	Streams of Thought, Vol. 3: Cane & Able	"Ghetto Boyz & Girls" (Black Thought featuring CS Armstrong)
2020	Streams of Thought, Vol. 3: Cane & Able	"Fuel" (Black Thought featuring Portugal. The Man & The Last Artful, Dodgr)
2020	Streams of Thought, Vol. 3: Cane & Able	"I’m Not Crazy" (Outro) (Black Thought)

== A&R/Executive Producer Credits ==
Artist Name	Year	Album
Mobb Deep	1996	Hell on Earth (Loud/RCA) - A&R assistant
Various Artists	1997	Soul in the Hole (Loud/RCA) -A&R
Big Pun	1998	Capital Punishment (Loud/RCA) - A&R
Dead Prez	2000	Let's Get Free (Loud/Sony) - executive producer
Big Pun	2000	Yeaah Baby (Loud/Sony) - associate executive producer
Big Pun	2001	Endangered Species (Loud/Sony) - co-executive producer
The X-Ecutioners	2002	Built from Scratch (Loud/Sony) - executive producer
Xzibit	2002	BK to LA (Loud/Sony) - A&R
The X-Ecutioners	2004	Revolutions (Sony) - executive producer
Dead Prez	2004	RBG: Revolutionary but Gangsta (Sony) - executive producer
Terror Squad	2004	True Story (SRC/Universal) - A&R
Remy Ma	2005	There's Something About Mary: Based on a True Story (SRC/Universal) - A&R
Sean C & LV	2014	Loud Dreams - executive producer

== Notes ==
A. Produced by LV
