= Ghostdini: Wizard of Poetry in Emerald City =

Studio album by Ghostface Killah
- Released: September 29, 2009
- Recorded: 2008–2009
- Genres: Hip-hop; R&B
- Length: 56:09
- Labels: Starks; Def Jam
- Producers: Sean C; LV; Mahogany; Scram Jones; Blickstreet; Xtreme; Clyde & Harry; Ant Acid; Austin "Watts" Garrick; Rashad "Ringo" Smith; Skymark; Bei Maejor; Tim Bosky; J.U.S.T.I.C.E. League; L.T. Moe; The Kaliphat

Ghostface Killah chronology
The Big Doe Rehab (2007)	Ghostdini: Wizard of Poetry in Emerald City (2009)	Wu-Massacre (2010)

Wu-Tang Clan solo chronology
Only Built 4 Cuban Linx... Pt. II (2009)	Ghostdini: Wizard of Poetry in Emerald City (2009)	Manifesto (2010)

Professional ratings
Aggregate scores
Source	Rating
Metacritic	68/100
Review scores
Source	Rating
AllMusic	3.5/5 stars
The A.V. Club	B
HipHopDX	3.5/5 stars
MSN Music (Consumer Guide)	A−
Pitchfork	5.1/10
PopMatters	7/10
Rolling Stone	4/5 stars
Spin	7/10
Tiny Mix Tapes	1.5/5 stars
XXL	4/5 stars

Ghostdini: Wizard of Poetry in Emerald City is the eighth studio album by American rapper and Wu-Tang Clan-member Ghostface Killah, released September 29, 2009 on Starks Enterprises and Def Jam Recordings in the United States. He first announced the album in a May 2008 interview, describing it as an R&B-inspired album, similar to his previous work with such artists as Ne-Yo and Jodeci. The album spawned four singles; "Baby", a slow-tempo R&B song with auto-tune vocals by Raheem "Radio" DeVaughn, "Forever", "Let's Stop Playin'" featuring John Legend, and "Guest House", featuring Fabolous & Shareefa. Upon its release, Ghostdini: Wizard of Poetry in Emerald City received generally positive reviews from music critics. As of December 12, 2009, the album has sold 64,000 copies in the United States.

== Reception ==
Ghostdini: Wizard of Poetry in Emerald City received positive reviews from most music critics. At Metacritic, which assigns a normalized rating out of 100 to reviews from mainstream critics, the album received an average score of 68, based on 13 reviews, which indicates "generally favorable reviews". AllMusic editor David Jeffries gave it three-and-a-half out of five stars and called the album an "oversexed, always fun, and occasionally hilarious effort", commenting that "Nasty as he wants to be, Ghostdini is nothing more than the Face and friends having a good time. The results are as improper as they are infectious". The Smoking Section wrote that "makes its mark as Ghostface’s most idealistic album furthering its distinction against Ghost’s previously renowned offerings". Delusions of Adequacy's Bryan Sanchez commented that "Forever flourishing, there is so much to love about an album as playfully awesome as this one". Time Out writer Jesse Serwer gave it four out of five stars and complimented Ghostface Killah's "risqué approach" to R&B, calling the album "unique among efforts by rappers to reach into such territory: It’s in no way soft".

However, Larry Fitzmaurice of Tiny Mix Tapes gave it one-and-a-half out of five stars and disliked the album's subject matter, stating "as an album, it’s complete shit, but at least there are a few tracks to listen to when you’re driving". Jon Dolan of Spin gave the album a seven out of 10 rating and wrote favorably of Ghostface Killah's lyrics, stating "Even the raw stuff has the humanizing detail that keeps Ghost interesting years after we've grown accustomed to his imagesplaying Joycean flow". In his consumer guide for MSN Music, critic Robert Christgau gave the album an A− rating. Christgau commended Ghostface's "potentially ridiculous switch to love man" and commented that "rhymewise, this is original work. Eschewing oily sexual details, luxury purchases, and vows of generalized devotion, Ghost mines the same kind of specifics that juice his gangsta repertoire".

Zach Kelly of Pitchfork gave the bonus track "She's a Killah" featuring Ron Browz a strongly negative review, calling it a "wince-inducing collaboration". Referring to the chorus, Kelly said Browz was "testing the world's capacity for Auto-Tuned vocals" and "tossing out stuff that would make T-Pain blush". He criticized Ghostface's bars as lacking effort, drawing particular negative attention to the closing line from Ghostface in which he raps "I'm ballin', gettin' Arab money and I pop champagne/ Still get busy without the T-Pain."

== Track listing ==
Ghostdini: Wizard of Poetry in Emerald City track listing
No.	Title	Writer(s)	Producer(s)	Length
1.	"Not Your Average Girl" (featuring Shareefa)	Dennis Coles; Marc Shemer; Corey Burton; Delisha Thomas; Shareefa Cooper; Kenneth Gamble; Leon Huff; Dexter Wansel	Scram Jones; Blickstreet (co.)	3:48
2.	"Do Over" (featuring Raheem "Radio" DeVaughn)	Coles; Imsomie Leeper; Raheem DeVaughn; Norman Feels; James A. Smith	Mahogany	4:35
3.	"Baby" (featuring Raheem "Radio" DeVaughn)	Coles; Austin Garrick; Rashad Smith; DeVaughn	Austin "Watts" Garrick; Rashad "Ringo" Smith	4:12
4.	"Lonely" (featuring Jack Knight)	Coles; Deleno Matthews; Levar Coppin; Jack Knight; Claude Forbes; Ed Maverick; James Anthony Carmichael; Reve Gibson	Sean C & LV	4:34
5.	"Stapleton Sex"	Coles; Matthews; Coppin	Sean C & LV	2:33
6.	"Stay"	Coles; Marc Friedli; Harvey Fuqua; Arthur Scott; Vernon Williams	Skymark	2:56
7.	"Paragraphs of Love" (featuring Vaughn Anthony & Estelle)	Coles; Vaughn Anthony Stephens; Estelle Swaray; Brandon Green; Tim Bullock; Lester Shaw; Sassieon Hill; Miguel Jimenez	Bei Maejor; Tim Bosky	3:53
8.	"Guest House" (featuring Fabolous & Shareefa)	Coles; Erik Ortiz; Kevin Crowe; Johnny Pate	J.U.S.T.I.C.E. League	4:29
9.	"Let's Stop Playin'" (featuring John Legend)	Coles; Matthews; Coppin; David Goode; John Stephens; Marvin Gaye; James Nyx Jr.	Sean C & LV	4:23
10.	"Forever"	Coles; Clyde Ellison; Harry Mejias; Omar Grant; Gerald Harris	Clyde & Harry	3:41
11.	"I'll Be That" (featuring Adrienne Bailon)	Coles; Kristal Oliver; Todd Moore	L.T. Moe	4:09
12.	"Goner" (featuring Lloyd)	Coles; Matthews; Coppin; James Lewis; David Brown; Mark Adams; Steve Arrington; Raye Turner; Steve Washington; Danny Webster	Sean C & LV	4:54
13.	"She's a Killah" (featuring Ron Browz)	Coles; Rondell Turner; Anthony Caputo	Anthony "Acid" Caputo	4:03
14.	"Back Like That (Remix)" (featuring Kanye West & Ne-Yo)	Coles; Vernon Brown; Shaffer Smith; Willie Hutch	Xtreme	4:02
Total length:				56:09

- "Stapleton Sex" was excluded from the album's censored version.

Sample credits

- "Not Your Average Girl" contains elements of "Drowning in the Sea of Love" performed by Joe Simon, and excerpts from "Theme From the Planets" performed by Dexter Wansel
- "Do Over" contains excerpts from "You Can't Stop My Love" performed by Norman Feels
- "Lonely" contains samples of "Lonesome Lonely & Alone" performed by Love Peace & Happiness
- "Baby" contains samples of "Grasshoppers" performed by Ryuichi Sakamoto
- "Stay" contains samples of "Stay A Little Longer" performed by Yvonne Fair
- "Guest House" contains samples of "El Jardia" performed by Johnny Pate
- "Let's Stop Playin'" contains samples of "Inner City Blues (Make Me Wanna Holler)" performed by Marvin Gaye
- "Forever" contains elements of "We'll Always Be Together" performed by The Whatnauts
- "Goner" contains elements of "Watching You"
- "Back Like That" contains a sample of "Baby Come Home" performed by Willie Hutch, and an interpolation of "Song Cry" performed by Jay-Z

== Personnel ==
Credits for Ghostdini: Wizard of Poetry in Emerald City adapted from Allmusic.

- Bei Maejor – engineer (7)
- D. Brown – vocal production (12)
- Anthony "Acid" Caputo – engineer (1–14), mixing (6, 14)
- Mike Caruso – executive producer
- Dennis Coles – executive producer, creative direction
- Tony Dawsey – mastering
- Claude "Quo" Forbes – background vocals (4)
- Moses Gallart – assistant engineer (7)
- Ed "Wolverine" Goldson – bass (4, 5, 9), guitar (4, 5), keyboards (5)
- Joe "Thelonius" Harley – keyboards (9, 12)
- Brian Herman – engineer (9)
- Ken "Duro" Ifill – mixing (1–5, 7–13)
- Jack Knight – background vocals (4)
- James Lewis – bass (12), guitar (9, 12)
- Mela Machinko – background vocals (5)
- Lorenzo Miles – engineer (12)
- Nico – mixing (14)
- Antonio "L.A." Reid – executive producer
- Scutch Robinson – co-executive producer
- Lenny Santiago – co-executive producer
- Shareefa – additional vocals (8)
- Skymark – engineer (6)
- Kia Smith – additional vocals (8)
- Rashad Smith – engineer (3)
- Michael Tocci – engineer (14)
- Serge Tsai – engineer (7)
- Tumblin' Dice Productions – instrumentation (3)
- Doug Wilson – engineer (4, 5, 9, 12)
- Jordan "DJ Swivel" Young – engineer (1–3, 8, 11), mix assistant (1–5, 7–13)

== Charts ==
Chart (2009)	Peak position
US Billboard 200	28
US Top R&B/Hip-Hop Albums (Billboard)	6
US Top Rap Albums (Billboard)	3
