= Lost Jewlry =

Mixtape by Raekwon
- Released: January 15, 2013
- Recorded: 2012
- Genre: Hip-hop
- Label: Ice H20 Records
- Producer: Statik Selektah, Scram Jones, Buckwild, Vin Da Chin, Frank G., Roads-Art, DJ Thoro

Raekwon chronology
Shaolin vs. Wu-Tang (2011)	Lost Jewlry (2013)	F.I.L.A. (Fly International Luxurious Art) (2015)

Professional ratings
Review scores
Source	Rating
Consequence of Sound	3/5 stars
Exclaim!	8/10

Lost Jewlry is the twelfth mixtape by American rapper and Wu-Tang Clan member Raekwon. It was released on January 15, 2013 for free. The mixtape features guest appearances from Faith Evans, Freddie Gibbs, Altrina Renee and Maino, and includes production from Scram Jones, Buckwild and more. It was released in promotion of his forthcoming studio album, F.I.L.A. (Fly International Luxurious Art).

== Background ==
In 2012, Raekwon launched his own record label, Ice H2O Records. He announced on November 30, 2012, that he will soon release an EP titled Lost Jewlry. On December 20, he released the first single titled, "Never Can Say Goodbye". However the single did not make the final cut. The mixtape was originally scheduled to be released on January 8, 2013, but was later pushed back until January 15, 2013. The music video for "Came Up" was released on January 16, 2013. On March 14, 2013, an extended/remix version of "86'" was released featuring a verse from rapper AZ. A video was released the same day.

== Track listing ==
No.	Title	Producer(s)	Length
1.	"A Kings Chariot" (Intro)	Statik Selektah	1:02
2.	"Prince of Thieves"	Scram Jones	2:46
3.	"Young Boy Penalties"	Scram Jones	2:38
4.	"Hold You Down" (featuring Faith Evans)	Buckwild	3:03
5.	"For the Listeners"	Vin Da Chin	2:28
6.	"Die Tonight"	Frank G.	2:44
7.	"New Day" (featuring Freddie Gibbs)	Roads-Art	3:09
8.	"Lead Season"	Frank G.	2:40
9.	"86'" (featuring Altrina Renee)	DJ Thoro	2:48
10.	"Came Up"	Scram Jones	2:35
11.	"To the Top" (featuring Maino)	Roads-Art	2:37
12.	"Whatever, Whenever"	Roads-Art	3:46
