= MMM (Money Making Mitch) =

Mixtape by Puff Daddy & the Family
- Released: November 4, 2015
- Recorded: 2014–2015
- Genre: East Coast hip hop
- Length: 44:10
- Label: Bad Boy; Epic
- Producer: Puff Daddy; 88-Keys; Ayo; D'Mile; Don P; Harry Fraud; Hollywood Hot Sauce; Honorable C.N.O.T.E.; Keyz; Kuk Harrell; Mario Winans; Mike WiLL Made-It; Nashiem Myrick; P-Nasty; Rob Holladay; Sean C & LV; Smash David; Stevie J

Puff Daddy & the Family chronology
Last Train to Paris (2010)	MMM (Money Making Mitch) (2015)	The Love Album: Off the Grid (2023)

MMM (Money Making Mitch) is the first mixtape by Puff Daddy & the Family, originally released on November 4, 2015, as a free mixtape on Bad Boy Records and Epic Records. It was later re-released on iTunes as a retail project on December 18, 2015. It served as a lead-up following the announcement of Puff Daddy's ultimately-unreleased fifth studio album, No Way Out 2, which would have been a direct sequel to his first studio album, No Way Out (1997).

The mixtape features guest appearances from hip hop artists including Big Sean, French Montana, Future, Jadakiss, Lil' Kim, Pusha T, Styles P, Travis Scott, Ty Dolla Sign, and Wiz Khalifa. It also features production from Puff Daddy himself, 88-Keys, Ayo, D'Mile, Don P, Harry Fraud, Hollywood Hot Sauce, Honorable C.N.O.T.E., Keyz, Kuk Harrell, Mario Winans, Mike WiLL Made-It, Nashiem Myrick, P-Nasty, Rob Holladay, Sean C & LV, Smash David and Stevie J.

== Release ==
Money Making Mitch was made available for free digital download on Diddy's 46th birthday via mixtape hosting site DatPiff and to stream on Spotify and Bad Boy Entertainment's SoundCloud account, originally in an edited form.

== Critical reception ==
Professional ratings
Aggregate scores
Source	Rating
Metacritic	69/100
Review scores
Source	Rating
Complex	3.5/5 stars
HipHopDX	3.5/5 stars
Pitchfork Media	6.6/10
Rolling Stone	3.5/5 stars
Soul in Stereo	3.5/5 stars

According to the review aggregator Metacritic, MMM received "generally favorable reviews" based on a weighted average score of 69 out of 100 from 5 critic scores. HipHopDX believed that the mixtape was traditionally Puff Daddy, showcasing "mostly all the traditional elements we know and love about Daddy’s music but runs into a bit of an identity crisis."

== Track listing ==
MMM (Money Making Mitch) track listing
No.	Title	Writer(s)	Producer(s)	Length
1.	"Facts"	Sean Combs; Deleno Matthews; LeVar Coppin; Bob Crewe; Charles Fox	Sean C & LV; Puff Daddy; Mario Winans^{[b]}	1:44
2.	"Harlem" (featuring Gizzle)	Combs; Austin Owens; David Styles; Glenda Proby; Paul Simon; John Padgett	Ayo; Keyz; Puff Daddy; Winans^{[b]}; Hollywood Hot Sauce^{[b]}	3:36
3.	"Help Me" (featuring Sevyn Streeter)	Combs; Dawson; Styles; Amber Streeter; Robert Williams; Alfredo Buongusto	Hollywood Hot Sauce; Puff Daddy; Winans^{[b]}; D'Mile^{[b]}	4:00
4.	"Everyday (Amor)" (featuring Jadakiss, Styles P, Pusha T and Tish Hyman)	Combs; Styles; Nashiem Myrick; Don Davidson; Jason Phillips; Terrence Thornton; Joaquín Rodrigo	Nashiem Myrick; Don P; Winans^{[a]}; Puff Daddy^{[a]}; Sean C & LV^{[b]}; Hollywood Hot Sauce^{[b]}	4:35
5.	"Auction" (featuring Lil' Kim, King Los and Styles P)	Combs; Winans; Styles; Carlos Coleman; Miles Tackett; Darryl Jackson Jr.	Winans; Puff Daddy	3:45
6.	"Cocaine" (featuring Gizzle)	Combs; Proby; Carlton Mays Jr.	Honorable C.N.O.T.E.	3:25
7.	"MMM" (featuring Future and King Los)	Combs; Winans; Coleman; Michael Williams II; Nayvadius Wilburn; Pierre Slaughter	Puff Daddy; Mike Will Made It; P-Nasty^{[a]}; Winans^{[b]}	4:48
8.	"All or Nothing" (featuring French Montana and Wiz Khalifa)	Combs; Karim Kharbouch; Cameron Thomaz; Michael Clervoix; Esteban Crandle; Aaron Rogers; Rashard Johnson	The Breed	3:08
9.	"Workin'" (featuring Big Sean and Travis Scott)	Combs; Robert Watson; Cydel Young; Chazwick Bundick; Sean Anderson; Jacques Webster	Rob Holladay	4:23
10.	"Alpha Male"			1:01
11.	"Old Man Wildin'" (featuring Jadakiss and Styles P)	Combs; Phillips; Styles; Charles Njapa	88-Keys	3:31
12.	"Happily Ever After (Interlude)"			0:43
13.	"You Could Be My Lover" (featuring Ty Dolla Sign and Gizzle)	Combs; Winans; Proby; Coppin; Matthews; Nye Lee; Antonius Thomas; Steven Jordan; Tyrone Griffin Jr.	Winans; Puff Daddy; Kuk Harrell; Stevie J^{[a]}; Sean C & LV^{[b]}	4:35
14.	"Uptown" (featuring Brucie B)	Bruce Robinson		0:35
15.	"Money Ain't a Problem" (featuring French Montana)	Combs; Kharbouch; Jordan; Rory Quigley	Harry Fraud	3:53
16.	"Blow a Check (Bad Boy Remix)" (Zoey Dollaz featuring Puff Daddy and French Montana)	Combs; Elvis Millord; Kharbouch; Samuel Jimenez	Smash David	4:20
Total length:				44:10

Track notes

- ^{^[a]} signifies a co-producer.
- ^{^[b]} signifies an additional producer.
- "Facts" features background vocals from Erin Sanderson.
- "Help Me" contains elements from "Pensieri", performed by Fred Bongusto.
- "Blow a Check" is a remix of Zoey Dollaz's song "Blow a Check.

== Charts ==
Chart performance for MMM (Money Making Mitch)
Chart (2016)	Peak position
US Top R&B/Hip-Hop Albums (Billboard)	45
US Top Rap Albums (Billboard)	23
