= House of Love (Smooth Touch song) =

Single by Smooth Touch
- Released: 1993
- Recorded: 1993
- Genre: Electronica/deep house
- Length: 4:50
- Label: Strictly Rhythm Records
- Songwriter(s): Erick Morillo; Kenny Lewis
- Producer(s): Glady "Ski" Pizarro; Erick Morillo; Kenny Lewis

Smooth Touch singles chronology
"House of Love" (1993)	"Come And Take A Trip" (1994)

"House of Love" (also known as "House of Love (In My House)") is a 1993 deep house song recorded, written, and produced by Erick Morillo and Kenny Lewis under the collaboration project known as Smooth Touch, one of several projects that Morillo was involved with during his tenure at Strictly Rhythm Records.

== Background ==
The single features four versions, with Cynthia Seijo providing the original vocals, while the remixes sampled vocalist Althea McQueen screaming the song's only words "IN MY HOUSE!" repeatedly against a building techno house tribal beat throughout.

The single-sided "Raise Your House" remix (exclusive to DJs only as a promo) sampled the drumbeat from "Give It Up" by The Goodmen (which in turn was sampled from "Fanfarra" by Sergio Mendes), the vocal lyrics ("Raise Your Hands") from "We Can Make It" by Sole Fusion, and the synth loop from "Can You Feel It" by CLS. This version was also included in the international releases.

The single was Morillo's second number-one single on Billboard's Hot Dance Club Play chart, after "The New Anthem" with his more successful project, Reel 2 Real." The track also peaked at #58 in the UK Singles Chart in April 1994.

== Track listings ==
12 inch (US)

- A1 "House Of Love (Love Mix)" (featuring Cynthia Seijo and Marlo Bennett) (4:50)
- A2 "House Of Love (Seduction Mix)" (featuring Cynthia Seijo and Marlo Bennett) (6:50)
- B1 "House Of Love (More/Phearce Mix)" (featuring Althea McQueen) (6:50)
- B2 "House Of Love ("More" Acid Beats)" (2:50)

Single-side promo (US)

- A House Of Love (In My House) (The Raise Your House Mix; remixed by Anthony Acid) (8:45)
