= The Last Kiss (album) =

Studio album by Jadakiss
- Released: March 24, 2009
- Recorded: 2008–2009
- Genres: East Coast hip-hop; hardcore hip-hop
- Length: 67:29
- Labels: D-Block; Ruff Ryders; Roc-A-Fella; Def Jam
- Producers: Shawn Carter (exec.); Darrin "Dee" Dean (exec.); Jay "Icepick" Jackson (exec.); Joaquin "Waah" Dean (exec.); Baby Grand; Buckwild; ChopHouze; DJ Neeli Neel; Eddie F; Eric Hudson; Fiend; Mr. Porter; Needlz; Neenyo; Neo da Matrix; Sean C & LV; Snagz; Swiff D; Swizz Beatz; The Alchemist; The Inkredibles; The Neptunes

Jadakiss chronology
Kiss of Death (2004)	The Last Kiss (2009)	Top 5 Dead or Alive (2015)

Singles from The Last Kiss
- 1. "By My Side" Released: October 7, 2008; 2. "Can't Stop Me" Released: February 17, 2009; 3. "Death Wish" Released: March 24, 2009; 4. "Who's Real" Released: June 16, 2009

The Last Kiss is the third studio album by American rapper Jadakiss. The album was released on March 24, 2009, on D-Block, Ruff Ryders, Roc-A-Fella and Def Jam, after numerous delays. The album marked his debut with the label, following his departure from Interscope Records. The album features guest appearances from Faith Evans, Swizz Beatz, Bobby V, Pharrell Williams, OJ da Juiceman, Sheek Louch, Mary J. Blige, Styles P, Ghostface Killah, Ne-Yo, Raekwon, Young Jeezy, D-Block, U.S.D.A., Lil Wayne, & Avery Storm. Production on the album is handled by The Alchemist, Buckwild, Swizz Beatz, Neo da Matrix, The Neptunes, Baby Grand, Eric Hudson, Needlz, Sean C, LV & DJ Eddie F.

The album was the final release on Roc-A-Fella Records by an artist other than Jay-Z or Kanye West.

Its first single, "By My Side" featuring Ne-Yo was released on October 7, 2008, and peaked at number 16 on the Hot Rap Songs chart, while its second single, "Can't Stop Me" peaked at number 78 and was released on February 17, 2009. On March 10 of that year, "Letter to B.I.G" was released as a promotional single, and was also included on the soundtrack to the film Notorious. "Death Wish" was released as the third single on March 24, 2009, and features Lil Wayne. The fourth and final single, "Who's Real" was digitally released on May 5, 2009, released for airplay on June 9, 2009, and released on June 16, 2009, and features Swizz Beatz and OJ da Juiceman. The album received mixed to positive reviews from music critics.

== Background ==
After securing a new deal with Jay-Z and Roc-A-Fella Records, Jadakiss began recording in 2008. After multiple push backs, the album was given an April 7, 2009, release date.

The original album title was Kiss My Ass, however Jada decided to change the album title:

I had to change the name of my album because "Kiss My Ass" wasn’t testing well at retail; not even with the exclamations or none of that so we had to change it to The Last Kiss, Jada explained during an interview with music website, BestofBothOffices.com.

As The Last Kiss might lead some to believe that it could be Jadakiss' final album, he immediately stated that he has no plans to retire anytime soon and explained the meaning behind the album's title.

Some people asked me if this was my last album, nah, it’s just the first album was Kiss tha Game Goodbye, the second album was The Kiss of Death, so this one is The Last Kiss; it’s the closing of a trilogy. This is the last time the word "Kiss" is going to be in any of my album titles.

== Critical reception ==
Professional ratings
Aggregate scores
Source	Rating
Metacritic	(61/100)
Review scores
Source	Rating
AllHipHop	(7/10)
AllMusic	2.5/5 stars
Entertainment Weekly	B
HipHopDX	3.5/5 stars
Pitchfork Media	(5.2/10)
RapReviews	(7.5/10)
Spin	(4/10)
USA Today	3/4 stars
Vibe	3/5 stars
XXL	4/5 stars

The Last Kiss received generally positive reviews from music critics. At Metacritic, which assigns a normalized rating out of 100 to reviews from critics, the album received an average score of 61, which indicates "generally favorable reviews", based on 7 reviews. David Jeffries of AllMusic said, "In a genre where albums frequently miss their street date, Jadakiss' The Last Kiss is an especially late hip-hop release, having been pushed back, retitled, and retooled numerous times. This problematic arrival shows too in the final product, but the problem may not be the much maligned rapper's ability or inspiration but the constant mishandling of his material. So many prime street cuts have been given away to comps, mixtapes, and soundtracks in the five years since Kiss of Death was released that only the slick, polished numbers remain, save the misleading kickoff "Pain & Torture."

Steve Jones of USA Today said, "Though Kiss isn't as gritty as his previous efforts — a sign of maturity, perhaps — he still serves up plenty of bangers for hard cases. There's no shortage of songs boasting of his accomplishments, 'hood credentials and microphone prowess. But he also takes a broader view and more varied sonic palette." HipHopDX said, "Even if there are a handful of tracks that should've been shaved off, there's nothing outright bad on The Last Kiss and a lot that's good. It probably won't be a standout in his overall catalogue when its all said and done (especially compared to the disgracefully underrated Kiss of Death) but it's a solid entry nonetheless. A good album from a great rapper--give it your time." Simon Vozick-Levinson of Entertainment Weekly said, "When he caters to changed times, the results are forgettable. But when he stays in his lane, there’s no one who can snarl a couplet quite like him."

== Commercial performance ==
The album debuted at number three on the Billboard 200, selling 134,520 copies in its first week. Jadakiss later responded to the sales, by explaining he was pleased with the album's overall success, and that it has since been attributed to traditional marketing.

== Track listing ==
Credits adapted from the album's liner notes.

No.	Title	Writer(s)	Producer(s)	Length
1.	"Pain & Torture"	Jason Phillips; Anthony Best; Ray Russell	Buckwild	3:09
2.	"Can't Stop Me" (featuring Ayanna Irish)	Phillips; Qaadir Atkinson; Ayanna Irish; Nickolas Ashford; Valerie Simpson	Neo da Matrix	3:52
3.	"Who's Real" (featuring Swizz Beatz and OJ da Juiceman)	Phillips; Naki Levy; Kasseem Dean; Otis Williams	Snagz; Swizz Beatz (co.)	3:11
4.	"Grind Hard" (featuring Mary J. Blige)	Phillips; Maurice Carpenter; Leigh Elliott; Johnny Mollings; Leonardo Mollings; Mary J. Blige; Makeba Riddick	The Inkredibles	5:06
5.	"Something Else" (featuring Young Jeezy)	Phillips; Richard Jones; Jay Jenkins	Fiend	3:35
6.	"One More Step" (featuring Styles P)	Phillips; Delano Matthews; Levar Coppin; David Styles	Sean C & LV	4:26
7.	"Stress Ya" (featuring Pharrell Williams)	Phillips; Pharrell Williams	The Neptunes	3:39
8.	"What If" (featuring Nas)	Phillips; Jonathan Joyner; Jahmon Pauling; Nasir Jones; Styles	ChopHouze	3:55
9.	"Things I've Been Through"	Phillips; Loren Lunnon; Luther Vandross	Mr. Devine	3:40
10.	"I Tried" (featuring Avery Storm)	Phillips; Robert Adair; Ralph Di Stasio	Baby Grand	3:39
11.	"Rockin' with the Best" (featuring Pharrell Williams and Bobby V)	Phillips; P. Williams	The Neptunes	3:20
12.	"Smoking Gun" (featuring Jazmine Sullivan)	Phillips; Denaun Porter; Jazmine Sullivan	Mr. Porter	3:42
13.	"Cartel Gathering" (featuring Ghostface Killah and Raekwon)	Phillips; Edward Ferrell; Steve Thorton; Dennis Coles; Corey Woods; Barry Gibb; Maurice Gibb; Robin Gibb	Eddie F; Swiff D	2:53
14.	"Come & Get Me" (featuring S.I. and Sheek Louch)	Phillips; Sean Seaton; Sean Jacobs; David Frank; Mic Murphy	Neenyo	3:07
15.	"By My Side" (featuring Ne-Yo)	Phillips; Eric Hudson; Shaffer Smith; Teena Marie Brockert	Eric Hudson	3:29
16.	"Letter to B.I.G." (featuring Faith Evans)	Phillips; Khari Cain; Tony Aliperti; Faith Evans; Gwen Guthrie; Patrick Grant	Needlz	3:59
17.	"Something Else" (remix) (featuring Young Jeezy, Snype Life, Bully, A.P., Boo Rossini and Blood Raw)	Phillips; R. Jones; Jenkins; Trelane Martin; Donnelle Little; Adrian Parker; Roderick Williams; Bruce Falson	Fiend	5:23
18.	"Death Wish" (featuring Lil Wayne)	Phillips; Alan Maman; Dwayne Carter	The Alchemist	3:24
Total length:				67:29

Deluxe edition (bonus track)
No.	Title	Writer(s)	Producer(s)	Length
19.	"Respect My Conglomerate" (performed by Busta Rhymes featuring Lil Wayne and Jadakiss)	Phillips; Trevor Smith, Jr; Bernard Edwards, Jr.; Carter	Focus...	3:34

• (co.) Co-producer

Sample credits

- "Pain & Torture" contains samples of "Montage of Power", written and performed by Ray Russell.
- "Can't Stop Me" contains an interpolation of "Ain't No Mountain High Enough", written by Nickolas Ashford and Valerie Simpson.
- "Things I've Been Through" contains samples of "Promise Me", written and performed by Luther Vandross.
- "Cartel Gathering" contains a sample of "Warm Ride", written by Barry Gibb, Maurice Gibb, and Robin Gibb, as performed by Rare Earth.
- "Come and Get Me" contains samples of "This Is My Night", written by David Frank and Mic Murphy, as performed by Chaka Khan.
- "By My Side" contains interpolations of "I Need Your Lovin'", written by Teena Marie Brockert.
- "Letter to B.I.G." contains interpolations from "This Time I'll Be Sweeter", written by Gwen Guthrie and Patrick Grant.
- "Death Wish" contains samples of "Ja sam žena", written by Meri Cetinić and Ivica Flesch, and performed by Cetinić.

== Charts ==
=== Weekly charts ===
Chart (2009)	Peak position
Canadian Albums (Nielsen SoundScan)	44
Swiss Albums (Schweizer Hitparade)	96
US Billboard 200	3
US Top R&B/Hip-Hop Albums (Billboard)	1

=== Year-end charts ===
Chart (2009)	Position
US Billboard 200	98
US Top R&B/Hip-Hop Albums (Billboard)	18
