= Prisoner of Conscious =

Studio album by Talib Kweli
- Released: May 7, 2013
- Genre: Hip-hop
- Length: 56:52
- Label: Javotti Media; EMI; Capitol
- Producer: Talib Kweli; Boi-1da; Caleb McCampbell; E. Jones; G Koop; Harry Fraud; J. Cole; Oh No; RZA; S1; Saadiq Bolden; Sean C & LV; Terrace Martin; Trend

Talib Kweli chronology
| Gutter Rainbows (2011) | Prisoner of Conscious (2013) | Gravitas (2013) |

Singles from Prisoner of Conscious
- 1. "Push Thru" Released: July 31, 2012; 2. "Upper Echelon" Released: January 29, 2013; 3. "Come Here" Released: April 23, 2013

Prisoner of Conscious is the fifth solo studio album by American rapper Talib Kweli. The album was released on May 7, 2013. The album features guest appearances from Nelly, Miguel, Currensy, Kendrick Lamar, Marsha Ambrosius, Busta Rhymes and Ryan Leslie along with production by RZA, Boi-1da, Harry Fraud, S1, Terrace Martin, Oh No, and J. Cole among others.

== Background ==
On September 17, 2012, the track listing for the album was released. On October 1, 2012, Talib Kweli announced the album would be released on November 20, 2012. On November 8, 2012, in an interview with Power 105, Talib Kweli announced that the album would be pushed back, saying:

"No, that's actually going to be pushed back. It was originally supposed to come out on Blacksmith/EMI/Capitol, it's no longer coming out on EMI/Blacksmith/Capitol. It was my label, we have now dismantled it," he said. "I have a label called Javotti Media, which I put my last album Gutter Rainbows on, so it's now coming out on Javotti/EMI/Capitol. But in order to make the transition, I pushed it back a couple of months. I'm looking at February."

On January 9, 2013, it was announced that Prisoner of Conscious would be released on April 23, 2013. On January 22, 2013, the album cover was released. On March 6, 2013, during an interview with MTV Talib Kweli announced the album would be pushed back until May 7, 2013.

Kweli has said that he has taken a broader approach in selecting tracks for this album, experimenting more overall and including tracks with a heavier focus on musicality. "Come Here", produced by Sean C and LV and featuring Miguel, has a 70s feel, something Kweli appreciated with the formers' contributions on Jay-Z's American Gangster. The album also features guest appearances from Melanie Fiona, Nelly, Curren$y, Kendrick Lamar, Marsha Ambrosius, Abby Dobson, Seu Jorge, Ryan Leslie and Busta Rhymes among others.

== Release and promotion ==
On September 3, 2012, Talib Kweli released the mixtape Attack The Block in promotion for the album. It featured guest appearances from Lil Wayne, Ab-Soul, Jay Rock, Ryan Leslie, Styles P, Greg Nice, Mack Maine, Das Racist and Black Thought among others.

On July 31, 2012, the first single was released in promotion of the album titled "Push Thru" featuring Glen Reynolds, Kendrick Lamar and Curren$y. On August 6, 2012, the music video for "Push Thru" premiered on MTV Jams. On January 29, 2013, "Upper Echelon" was released as the album's second single along with a music video. Kweli's choice for "Upper Echelon" as a single reflected his belief that singles should reflect what's going on in the culture at the time. On April 23, 2013, the music video was released for "High Life" featuring Rubix and Bajah. "Come Here" featuring singer Miguel was released as the album's third single on April 23, 2013. On April 23, 2013, Talib Kweli performed the song "Come Here" along with Bilal on Late Night with Jimmy Fallon. On May 28, 2013, the music video was released for "Come Here" featuring Miguel. On July 1, 2013, the music video was released for "Hamster Wheel". On August 20, 2013, the music video was released for "Human Mic". On September 23, 2013, the music video was released for "Turnt Up". On December 5, 2013, the music video was released for "Favela Love" featuring Seu Jorge.

== Critical response ==
Professional ratings
Review scores
| Source | Rating |
|---|---|
| AllMusic | 3.5/5 stars |
| Exclaim! | 8/10 |
| Fact | 2.5/5 stars |
| HipHopDX | 3/5 stars |
| The New York Times | (positive) |
| Pitchfork | 6.1/10 |
| PopMatters | 7/10 |
| Q | 3/5 stars |
| Slant Magazine | 4/5 stars |
| Tiny Mix Tapes | 4.5/5 stars |

Prisoner of Conscious was met with generally positive reviews from music critics. At Metacritic, which assigns a weighted mean rating out of 100 to reviews from mainstream critics, the album received an average score of 65, based on 17 reviews, which indicates "generally favorable reviews". David Jeffries of AllMusic gave the album three and a half stars out of five, saying "The album's title takes on a different meaning when the closing "It Only Gets Better" suggests freedom fighters like Mumia and Pussy Riot are the true Prisoners of Conscious. Still, the off-topic and amazing "Hamster Wheel" ("How she gonna make it through the night? /How she so accepting of her station in life?" offered with an Al Green-sized helping of hurt) is here, and when that's added to all the other highlights, the album is well above worthwhile, as scattershot and frustrating as it is." Kevin Jones of Exclaim! gave the album an eight out of ten, saying "With a quality collection of sturdy, theme-setting beats keeping things loose through most of the session, Kweli keeps compromise at bay and finds success in freshening things up a bit."

Mike Madden of Pitchfork gave the album a 6.1 out of 10, saying "Listening to Prisoner next to something like the new Chance the Rapper tape reveals the record’s biggest, most pervasive dilemma. Where Acid Rap is a seamless convergence of local and post-regional sounds, Prisoner takes on a bunch of things one by one without squeezing the most from any of them. Kweli’s absolutely owned his lane when he’s been committed to it but now he's jumping around from style to style with no destination in sight." Homer Johnsen of HipHopDX gave the album three out five stars, saying "Coined by Peter Benenson in 1961, a “Prisoner Of Conscience” is defined as “a person who has been imprisoned for holding political or religious views that are not tolerated by their own government.” Kweli is not calling himself a prisoner of conscience, but he is calling on his listeners to think outside the box, while being aware of top-down mental imprisonment. At the same time, he is also tackling the notion that he is a “prisoner” of the conscious rapper label by balancing the insular brand of Hip Hop championed by many of his early fans, with newer, more radio-friendly content. In a time where ill minds have begun using violence towards the innocent with greater frequency, Prisoner Of Conscious provides uplifting messages, as well as displays of artistic versatility. But these moments don't happen consistently or frequently enough to make it a superior album."

Chris Kelly of Fact gave the album two and a half stars out of five, saying "Prisoner of Conscious is simply missing the songs it needs, not only to reach a wider audience, but to truly engage its core one. Even though Kweli is trying to confront his critics head-on, from the title on down, the album suffers from the same problems that have plagued his last few efforts. Instead of updating his sound and style for a contemporary audience, Prisoner of Conscious comes off as a series of half measures." Nathan S. of DJBooth gave the album four out of five stars, saying "Prisoner of Conscious largely works because while Kweli is obviously determined to challenge ideas around the kind of music he “should” be making, he never lets his desire to prove his point overshadow his desire to make good music; except for Echelon. Lord knows I'm not going to doubt that Kweli is capable of making a true trap banger, but Echelon isn't that banger. Both the beat and Kweli's rhymes sound disappointingly flat, but in some ways, the fact that Echelon falls short is a good thing – it means he was genuinely trying to make a leap."

== Commercial performance ==
The album debuted at number 48 on the Billboard 200 chart, with first-week sales of 10,000 copies in the United States. In its second week the album sold 3,600 more copies bringing its total sales to 14,000.

== Track listing ==
| No. | Title | Writer(s) | Producer(s) | Length |
|---|---|---|---|---|
| 1. | "Intro" | | | 1:07 |
| 2. | "Human Mic" | Talib Greene; Mike Jackson; Marco Antonio Muñiz | Oh No | 2:18 |
| 3. | "Turnt Up" | Greene; Marquise Simms | Trend | 3:45 |
| 4. | "Come Here" (featuring Miguel) | Greene; Miguel Pimentel; Deleno Matthews; Levar Coppin | Sean C & LV | 4:27 |
| 5. | "High Life" (featuring Rubix & Bajah) | Greene; Jackson; Riketzo Ililonga; Ndara Mboyo | Oh No | 4:12 |
| 6. | "Ready Set Go" (featuring Melanie Fiona) | Greene; Kristen Ashley Cole; Melanie Hallim; Darnell Bolden | Saadiq Bolden | 4:26 |
| 7. | "Hold It Now" | Greene; Jackson | Oh No | 2:10 |
| 8. | "Push Thru" (featuring Curren$y, Kendrick Lamar, and Glen Reynolds) | Greene; Shante Franklin; Kendrick Duckworth; Glen Reynolds; Larry Griffin | S1 | 4:58 |
| 9. | "Hamster Wheel" | Greene; Jackson; Rob Mandell | Oh No; G Koop | 3:26 |
| 10. | "Delicate Flowers" | Greene; Griffin; Caleb McCampbell | S1; Caleb McCampbell | 3:18 |
| 11. | "Rocket Ships" (featuring Busta Rhymes) | Greene; Trevor Smith; Robert Diggs | RZA | 3:27 |
| 12. | "Before He Walked" (featuring Nelly and Abby Dobson) | Greene; Cornell Haynes; Abby Dobson; Eric Jones; Billy Strayhorn; Duke Ellington | E. Jones | 3:51 |
| 13. | "Upper Echelon" | Greene; Rory Quigley | Harry Fraud | 3:38 |
| 14. | "Favela Love" (featuring Seu Jorge) | Greene; Seu Jorge; Terrace Martin | Terrace Martin | 6:19 |
| 15. | "It Only Gets Better" (featuring Marsha Ambrosius) | Greene; Marsha Ambrosius; Jermaine Cole | J. Cole | 5:29 |
| Total length: | | | | 56:52 |

iTunes bonus track
| No. | Title | Writer(s) | Producer(s) | Length |
|---|---|---|---|---|
| 16. | "Outstanding" (featuring Ryan Leslie) | Greene; Anthony Leslie; Matthew Samuels | Boi-1da | 4:50 |

== Charts ==
| Chart (2013) | Peak position |
|---|---|
| US Billboard 200 | 48 |
| US Top R&B/Hip-Hop Albums (Billboard) | 7 |
| US Independent Albums (Billboard) | 9 |
