= Wu-Massacre =

2010 studio album by Meth Ghost Rae

Studio album by Meth • Ghost • Rae
- Released: March 30, 2010
- Recorded: November 2009–February 2010
- Genre: Hip-hop
- Length: 30:05
- Label: Wu-Tang; Starks; Def Jam
- Producer: Method Man (exec.); Ghostface Killah (exec.); Raekwon (exec.); RZA; Allah Mathematics; Scram Jones; Emile; Ty Fyffe; BT; Digem Tracks

Method Man chronology
Blackout! 2 (2009)	Wu-Massacre (2010)	The Meth Lab (2015)

Ghostface Killah chronology
Ghostdini: Wizard of Poetry in Emerald City (2009)	Wu-Massacre (2010)	Apollo Kids (2010)

Raekwon chronology
Only Built 4 Cuban Linx... Pt. II (2009)	Wu-Massacre (2010)	Shaolin vs. Wu-Tang (2011)

Alternative cover
- Method Man cover

Alternative cover
- Ghostface Killah cover

Alternative cover
- Raekwon cover

Singles from Wu-Massacre
- 1. "Our Dreams" Released: February 20, 2010; 2. "Meth vs. Chef 2" Released: March 09, 2010; 3. "Miranda" Released: March 16, 2010; 4. "Dangerous" Released: March 23, 2010

Professional ratings
Aggregate scores
Source	Rating
Metacritic	73/100
Review scores
Source	Rating
AllMusic	3.5/5 stars
The A.V. Club	B+
Entertainment Weekly	B+
The Harvard Crimson	4/5 stars
Pitchfork	6.5/10
Q	3/5 stars
Rolling Stone	3.5/5 stars
Slant Magazine	3.5/5 stars
URB	4/5 stars
USA Today	3.5/4 stars

Wu-Massacre is a collaboration studio album by American rappers and Wu-Tang Clan members Method Man, Ghostface Killah and Raekwon, under the group name Meth • Ghost • Rae, released March 30, 2010 on Ghostface Killah's Starks Enterprises, RZA's Wu-Tang Records, and Def Jam Recordings. Production for the album was handled by several hip-hop producers, including RZA, Allah Mathematics, Scram Jones, Emile, Ty Fyffe, BT and Digem Tracks Productions.

The album debuted at number 12 on the US Billboard 200 chart, selling 37,900 copies in its first week. It charted modestly in international markets and produced four singles. Upon its release, Wu-Massacre received generally positive reviews from music critics. The album has sold 100,000 copies in the United States.

== Background ==
The album was first announced in July 2009, when Method Man mentioned the project to MTV News, stating that he wanted to do an album with several other Wu-Tang members. He described the album as being a "Rae, Ghost and Meth album," with "RZA-produced tracks, as well as some outside producers." Initially, the album was to be titled Wu-Massacre, and was later renamed Three the Hard Way, however, after the leak of the Wu-Massacre artwork, it was later re-affirmed as the official album title. Though unsubstantiated rumors began to circulate that the project would be a new group, Method Man refuted these claims in a cover-story interview with The Source, stating: "By no means are we trying to start a group, that's why I was mad as hell that people was jumping the gun and shit, asking us to name our group and all that. What the fuck we look like making a new group?" Ghostface Killah also touched base on the subject in an interview with Rap Radar, stating "We not a group. We already in Wu-Tang. So it's not like we trying to start a group. We don't need that."

In an interview with MTV, Raekwon described the making of Wu-Massacre, as well as the album's production, stating;

A lot of the production was dealt with through us playing phone tag, Ghost had a lot to do with really binding the album together. It's a great album. I think the people gonna enjoy it. One thing about me that I could say is, lyrically, it's never been a problem for us to deliver. It's great production on the album. RZA is on there. A couple of other soldiers we work with is on there. If you're a ride-or-die Wu-Tang fan, and you know where we coming from, you're gonna enjoy this one.

— Raekwon

== Release and promotion ==
A three-part video series began to surface on the internet for the album's promotion in fall of 2009.

=== Singles ===
On November 25, 2009, Allah Mathematics premiered the song "Mef vs. Chef 2" live on his radio show Math Files. The song features verses from Method Man and Raekwon, and was said to be from Wu-Massacre. On January 25, 2010, Def Jam released the first single, "Our Dreams" on their website, which will be appearing on the Wu-Massacre album. On February 22, 2010, Def Jam released a free mixtape called, Avenging Eagles by Allah Mathematics featuring various older Raekwon, Ghostface and Method Man material as a warm-up to Wu-Massacre. Aside from "Mef vs. Chef 2," the mixtape also premiered the song "Miranda". On March 2, 2010 the next release from the album was "Criminology 2.5", an original Only Built 4 Cuban Linx... Pt. II track but was cut before the final pressing, but revised as it no longer contains Raekwon's verse, contains a re-used Ghostface Killah verse from the song "The Badlands" instead of the original verse planned for Only Built 4 Cuban Linx… Pt. II, and a verse from Method Man. "Mef vs. Chef 2" and "Miranda" have now been released as the album's second and third singles. On the release of the video for "Our Dreams" a fourth single was also released called "Dangerous". Another single ("Gunshowers") was released; it was produced by Digem Tracks Productions.

=== Artwork ===
All three cover portraits were created by Marvel Comics artist Chris Bachalo and inked by Tim Townsend. The third and final cover was released on March 15, with the illustration by Bachalo with art direction by Alex Haldi.

== Reception ==
=== Commercial performance ===
The album debuted at number 12 on the US Billboard 200 chart with first-week sales of 37,900 copies. In its second week, it fell 25 spots to number 37, selling an additional 11,000 for a total of 49,000 copies. The next week it sold 6,600 more copies going over the 50,000 mark selling 56,000. It also entered at number six on Billboard's Top R&B/Hip-Hop Albums and at number two on its Rap Albums chart. The album has sold 100,000 copies in the US as of August 2015.

In Canada, the album debuted at number 29 on the Top 100 and number four on the R&B Top 50 chart. In France, it entered at number 128 on Syndicat National de l'Édition Phonographique's albums chart.

=== Critical response ===
Wu-Massacre received generally positive reviews from music critics; it holds an aggregate score of 73/100 at Metacritic. Allmusic editor Andy Kellman called it "consistent, duly rugged, and satisfying". Entertainment Weekly's Simon Vozick-Levinson praised the rappers' lyricism and stated, "Method Man's acid sarcasm grounds Ghostface Killah's tightly wound exclamations, which in turn nicely balance Raekwon's flinty realism, and the trio's rhymes are well served throughout by big, soulful beats". Zach Cole of URB commended its energetic production and the rappers' lyrical deliveries, calling the album "a delight with not a wasted minute". USA Today's Steve Jones praised its production as a "rich, sonic tapestry", while writing that the rappers are "fierce and focused, firing steel-jacketed barbs with abandon on this wallop-packing collection". The Harvard Crimson's Colm Dubhrosa complimented its dynamic format, writing that "Wu-Massacre manages to condense all that is most vitally raw and dynamic about this hip-hop trio into a snappy 30-minute album that blazes by in a flash of intensity and verve".

In contrast, Exclaim!'s Del F. Cowie viewed its weaker tracks as those that do not feature all rappers and called the album "a patchy project that given some time and attentive conceptual execution could have been more than the sum of its parts". RapReviews writer Guido Stern called its production "uneven" and shared a similar sentiment, writing "Mostly it's just frustrating because the whole tape probably only has like six or seven verses from each of the headliners". Luke John Winkie of No Ripcord gave Wu-Massacre a 6/10 rating and called it "a fun, but mostly forgettable affair", but wrote "Rae, Ghost and Meth's undeniable flow can make even the slightest record worth a spin". Pitchfork Media's Ian Cohen commented that "at the record's core are three MCs willing to spend a little critical capital and just have fun over pitchshifted soul beats". Evie Nagy of Billboard wrote favorably of the rappers' performances and commended the album's production and cohesion among its tracks. Giving it an 8.0/10 rating, IGN critic Phil Owen viewed the album as a case of "quality over quantity" and wrote that it "all flows brilliantly".

The A.V. Club's Nathan Rabin wrote that the album "thrives on the chemistry between Ghostface Killah's excitable ranting, Raekwon's smoothness, and Method Man's combination of raspy humor and middle-aged grumpiness". Huw Jones of Slant Magazine perceived its sound as reminiscent of early Wu-Tang Clan albums, writing that it "celebrates the same stylistic elements that put Staten Island on the musical map in the '90s". HipHopDX writer Slava Kuperstein gave it four out of five stars and wrote "Wu-Massacre stands on its own merit as an assembly of three legendary emcees putting on display what earned them the legendary status in the first place". Rolling Stone's Jon Dolan viewed it as a return to the rappers' "classic-Wu roots" and commended the album for its "imperious soul samples, waves of purple haze and pointillist pimp fantasies". Tiny Mix Tapes writer Chris Norton gave it a three-and-a-half out of five rating and wrote that it "functions more as a reminder that these soldiers are still deep in the trenches, leaning on the time-tested skills and sounds that put them at the top of the 90s and spurred their revival in this past decade".

== Track listing ==
Wu-Massacre track listing
No.	Title	Writer(s)	Producer(s)	Length
1.	"Criminology 2.5" (Raekwon, Ghostface Killah and Method Man)	Corey Woods; Dennis David Coles; Clifford Smith, Jr.; Robert Fitzgerald Diggs; Leroy Burgess; Russell Patterson; Stuart Bascombe; Patrick Adams; Daniel Berger	BT	1:59
2.	"Mef vs Chef 2" (Method Man and Raekwon)	Smith, Jr.; Woods; Ronald Maurice Bean	Mathematics	2:03
3.	"Ya Moms Skit" (Method Man and Raekwon)	Smith, Jr.; Woods		0:36
4.	"Smooth Sailing Remix" (Method Man, Ghostface Killah, Solomon Childs and Street Life)	Smith, Jr.; Coles; Walbert Ryan Dale; Patrick Charles; Tyrone Gregory Fyffe; Walter Sigler	Ty Fyffe	2:57
5.	"Our Dreams" (Method Man, Ghostface Killah and Raekwon)	Smith, Jr.; Coles; Woods; Diggs; Brian Holland; Edward James Holland Jr.	RZA	3:24
6.	"Gunshowers" (Method Man, Ghostface Killah, Inspectah Deck and Sun God)	Smith, Jr.; Coles; Jason Richard Hunter; Dennis Ames; William Hart; Thomas Randolph Bell	Digem	2:58
7.	"Dangerous" (Raekwon, Ghostface Killah and Method Man)	Woods; Coles; Smith, Jr.; Bean	Mathematics	3:54
8.	"Pimpin' Chipp" (Ghostface Killah)	Coles; Emile Haynie	Emile Haynie	2:32
9.	"How to Pay Rent Skit" (Tracy Morgan)	Tracy Morgan		0:37
10.	"Miranda" (Raekwon, Ghostface Killah and Method Man)	Woods; Coles; Smith, Jr.; Bean; Gilbert Bécaud; Pierre Charles Marcel Napoléon Leroyer	Mathematics	3:01
11.	"Youngstown Heist" (Ghostface Killah, Trife da God, Sheek Louch and Bully)	Coles; Theo Bailey; Sean Divine Jacobs; Marc Shefer; Robert Owens	Scram Jones	2:42
12.	"It's That Wu Shit" (Ghostface Killah and Method Man)	Coles; Smith, Jr.; Shemer; Carlos Jiménez; Larry Mack; Reggie Hobody	Scram Jones	3:11
Total length:				30:05

== Personnel ==
Credits for Wu-Massacre adapted from liner notes.

- Clifford Smith – vocals, executive producer
- Dennis Coles – vocals, executive producer, artists and repertoire
- Corey Woods – vocals, executive producer
- Chris Bachalo – artwork
- Theodore Bailey – guest vocals
- Ronald Bean – producer
- Anthony Caputo – recorder, mixer
- Mel Carter – producer
- Mike Caruso – producer
- Patrick Charles – guest vocals
- Christina – additional vocals
- Kevin Cossom – additional vocals
- Mitchell Diggs – producer
- Robert Diggs – producer
- Tyrone Fyffe – producer
- Oli Grant – producer
- Alex Haldi – art director
- Dan Hastie – keyboards
- Darryl Hill – guest vocals
- Jason Hunter – guest vocals
- Sean Jacobs – guest vocals
- Scram Jones – producer
- Jamel Scott – producer
- Jordan Katz – trumpet, trombone
- James King – saxophone
- Donnelle Little – guest vocals
- Josh Lopez – guitars
- Pete McNeal – drums
- Tracy Morgan – additional vocals
- Ethan Phillips – bass
- Antonio Reid – producer
- Ron Robinson – producer
- Lenny Santiago – producer, artists and repertoire
- Davey Cheg Widden – percussion

== Charts ==
Chart (2010)	Peak position
Canadian Albums Chart	29
French Albums Chart	128
US Billboard 200	12
US Billboard Top R&B/Hip-Hop Albums	6
US Billboard Top Rap Albums	2
