= By My Side (Jadakiss song) =

Single by Jadakiss featuring Ne-Yo

from the album The Last Kiss
- Released: October 7, 2008
- Genre: Hip hop; R&B
- Length: 3:27
- Label: D-Block; Ruff Ryders; Roc-A-Fella; Def Jam
- Songwriters: Eric Hudson, Jason Phillips, Shaffer Smith
- Producer: Eric Hudson

Jadakiss singles chronology
"New York" (2004)	"By My Side" (2008)	"Respect My Conglomerate" (2009)

"By My Side" is the first single from rapper Jadakiss's third studio album, The Last Kiss. The song was produced by Eric Hudson and features R&B singer Ne-Yo. It samples Teena Marie's "I Need Your Lovin'".

== Music video ==
A music video was released on November 13, 2008. It was directed by Ray Kay.

== Charts ==
Chart (2008)	Peak position
US Hot R&B/Hip-Hop Songs (Billboard)	53
US Hot Rap Songs (Billboard)	16
