= Finna Get Loose =

- Cover art featuring a crop of the cover art from Marvin Gaye's 1976 album I Want You in neon lighting.

Single by Puff Daddy & The Family featuring Pharrell Williams
- Released: June 28, 2015
- Recorded: 2015
- Genre: Hip hop; funk
- Length: 3:59
- Label: Bad Boy; Epic
- Songwriters: Pharrell Williams; Sean Combs; Glenda Proby
- Producer: Pharrell Williams

Puff Daddy & The Family singles chronology
"I Want the Love" (2014)	"Finna Get Loose" (2015)	"Workin" (2015)

Pharrell Williams singles chronology
"It Girl" (2014)	"Finna Get Loose" (2015)	"Freedom" (2015)

"Finna Get Loose" is a song by American rapper Sean "Puff Daddy" Combs featuring fellow American musician Pharrell Williams. Produced by the latter, it was released on June 28, 2015.

== Music video ==
The music video directed by Hype Williams, the clip opens in stark black and white. The video was released on August 31, 2015 on Vevo and YouTube.

== Commercial performance ==
"Finna Get Loose" debut for the Billboard Hot R&B/Hip-Hop Songs entering the chart at number 44. Its chart debut was supported by first-week digital download sales of 26,000 copies, along with 446,000 domestic streams. The song entering at number 15 on Billboard Bubbling Under Hot 100 Singles.

== Track listing ==
- Digital download
1. "Finna Get Loose" (featuring Pharrell Williams) — 3:59

== Charts ==
=== Weekly charts ===
Chart (2015)	Peak position
US Bubbling Under Hot 100 (Billboard)	15
US Hot R&B/Hip-Hop Songs (Billboard)	44
