= Fly International Luxurious Art =

Studio album by Raekwon
- Released: April 28, 2015
- Recorded: 2012–2015
- Genre: Hip hop
- Length: 42:45
- Labels: Ice H20; Caroline
- Producers: Raekwon (exec.); Jerry Wonda; Swizz Beatz; She da God; Snaz; Scram Jones; S1; Frank G; Scoop DeVille; Bluerocks; Matthew Burnett; Arden Altino; Shama Joseph; Akene Dunkley; DZL

Raekwon chronology
Shaolin vs. Wu-Tang (2011)	Fly International Luxurious Art (2015)	The Wild (2017)

Wu-Tang Clan solo chronology
36 Seasons (2014)	Fly International Luxurious Art (2015)	The Meth Lab (2015)

Singles from Fly International Luxurious Art
- 1. "All About You" Released: August 20, 2013; 2. "Soundboy Kill It" Released: December 10, 2013; 3. "Wall to Wall" Released: March 17, 2015

Fly International Luxurious Art is the sixth studio album by American rapper and Wu-Tang Clan member Raekwon. The album was released on April 28, 2015, by Ice H20 Records and Caroline Records. The album was supported by the singles "All About You", "Soundboy Kill It" and "Wall to Wall".

== Background ==
On January 1, 2013, Raekwon announced that his next studio album would be titled "F.I.L.A.", an acronym for "Fly International Luxurious Art", and said it would be released in the second quarter of 2013. On February 15, 2013, Raekwon said the album was almost finished.

Raekwon said that the album is an ode to his "stylish" side and the album will contain elements of "glamour, lifestyle and fashion." He said he is attempting to appeal to a broader global audience and have this album become a "worldwide success". On July 22, 2013, he told MTV he was still working on the album, along with the upcoming Wu-Tang Clan album with the former due for a release near the end of the year.

== Recording and production ==
The album's recording process began in late 2012. For the album, he collaborated with artists such as Estelle, Melanie Fiona and Akon. Production on the album was handled by producers such as Jerry Wonda, RoadsArt and Frank G. among others. In a late-February 2014 interview, Raekwon stated that Akon and Snoop Dogg would be featured on the album. He also confirmed that the album was close to being complete.

== Release and promotion ==
Raekwon announced on November 30, 2012 that he would soon release an EP titled Lost Jewlry. The EP was released for free by his label Ice H2O on January 15, 2013. The EP featured guest appearances from Faith Evans, Freddie Gibbs, Altrina Renee and Maino, and includes production from Scram Jones, Buckwild and more.

On March 7, 2013, Raekwon announced that the album would be released in June 2013. On April 30, he announced that the album would be pushed back until September 2013. Then once the first single was released he confirmed a pushback until January 2014 during an interview in late August 2013 with ABC News.

Starting June 14 through June 30, 2013, Raekwon toured across Canada on the Canadian leg of his "Fly International Luxurious Art Tour". That legs opening act is the band Masters of Ceremonies. Following that, he toured the United States and Europe with the rest of the Wu-Tang Clan on their 20th Anniversary Tour. On June 20, 2014, he announced that the album would be released on September 16, 2014. However, on October 13, 2014, Raekwon confirmed via Twitter that the album was pushed back to 2015 in order to focus on the Wu-Tang Clan's latest album A Better Tomorrow.

=== Singles ===
The album's first single "All About You" featuring Estelle and produced by Jerry Wonda was released on August 20, 2013. The music video for "All About You" featuring Estelle had been shot in New York in June 2013. It was released two days after the song's retail release, via Fuse.

On June 6, 2013, "Soundboy Kill It" featuring Melanie Fiona was premiered. On December 10, 2013, "Soundboy Kill It" was released to iTunes as the album's second single. On March 17, 2015, the album's third single "Wall to Wall" featuring French Montana and Busta Rhymes was released.

== Critical reception ==
Professional ratings
Aggregate scores
Source	Rating
Metacritic	63/100
Review scores
Source	Rating
AllMusic	3/5 stars
The A.V. Club	B−
Consequence of Sound	B−
HipHopDX	3.5/5 stars
NME	8/10
The Observer	3/5 stars
Q	3/5 stars
Rolling Stone	3/5 stars
Slant Magazine	2.5/5 stars
Spin	7/10

Fly International Luxurious Art received positive reviews from music critics. At Metacritic, which assigns a normalized rating out of 100 to reviews from critics, the album received an average score of 63, which indicates "generally favorable reviews", based on 17 reviews. Michael Madden of Consequence of Sound said, "What F.I.L.A. lacks in overt emotional content is made up for with the pleasure Raekwon takes in listing off his lavish purchases and seemingly constant jet-setting. Still, he lets you know that his darker days aren’t that far behind him, and that those tribulations helped him become the uncompromising artist he is today." Homer Johnsen of HipHopDX said, "F.I.L.A. had two years of hype for what amounts to an album with little true cohesion. The finished product doesn’t quite match the overwhelming talent and legacy of the legendary emcee." Corbin Reiff of The A.V. Club said, "For all its unintended sonic drawbacks, Fly International Luxurious Art goes a long way to remind everyone of why Raekwon is one of the greatest to ever wield a microphone. His flow is masterful, his lines are sharp, and his verbiage is as dense and intricate as it’s ever been."

Jesse Cataldo of Slant Magazine said, "Fly International Luxurious Art maintains some level of general interest through a stacked guest list, with visitors as varied as Snoop Dogg, A$AP Rocky, Busta Rhymes, and 2 Chainz, but none of them do more than distract from the overall atmosphere of paltry unevenness." Justin Ivey of XXL said, "Fly International Luxurious Art ultimately suffers from its inability to connect with any particular audience. It makes for a very uneven listening experience as the album is unable to find any cohesive sound or theme."

== Track listing ==
Fly International Luxurious Art track listing
No.	Title	Writer(s)	Producer(s)	Length
1.	"Intro"	Corey Woods; Jerry Duplessis	Jerry Wonda	1:09
2.	"4 in the Morning" (featuring Ghostface Killah)	Woods; Dennis David Coles; Marc Shemer	Scram Jones	3:21
3.	"I Got Money" (featuring A$AP Rocky)	Woods; Rakim Athelaston Mayers; Larry Darnell Griffin Jr.; Duplessis	S1; Jerry Wonda	3:21
4.	"Wall to Wall" (featuring French Montana and Busta Rhymes)	Woods; Karim Kharbouch; Trevor George Smith Jr.; Ashley Bannister; Rene Hill	She da God; Snaz^{[a]}	5:02
5.	"Heated Nights"	Woods; Frank Guastella	Frank G	3:02
6.	"F.I.L.A. World" (featuring 2 Chainz)	Woods; Tauheed Epps; Shemer; Duplessis	Scram Jones; Jerry Wonda	4:21
7.	"1,2, 1,2" (featuring Snoop Dogg)	Woods; Calvin Cordozar Broadus, Jr.; Elijah Blue Molina	Scoop DeVille	3:20
8.	"Live to Die"	Woods; Griffin, Jr.	S1	3:12
9.	"Soundboy Kill It" (featuring Melanie Fiona and Assassin)	Woods; Angela Hunte; Jeffrey Campbell; Duplessis; Kasseem Daoud Dean; Arden Altino	Jerry Wonda; Swizz Beatz; Altino^{[a]}	3:07
10.	"Revory (Wraith)" (featuring Rick Ross and Ghostface Killah)	Woods; William Leonard Roberts II; Coles; Jamie Frank	Bluerocks	3:24
11.	"All About You" (featuring Estelle)	Woods; Estelle Fanta Swaray; Duplessis; Shama Joseph; Altino; Akene Dunkley	Jerry Wonda; Joseph; Altino^{[a]}; Dunkley^{[a]}	3:25
12.	"Nautilus"	Woods; Shemer	Scram Jones	2:39
13.	"Worst Enemy" (featuring Liz Rodrigues)	Woods; Liz Rodrigues; Matthew Raymond Burnett; Edward Supo; Michael Holmes	Matthew Burnett; DZL	3:43
Total length:				42:45

Fly International Luxurious Art — Best Buy deluxe version
No.	Title	Writer(s)	Producer(s)	Length
14.	"Internationalism"	Woods; Shemer	Scram Jones	2:56
Total length:				45:48

Notes

- ^{^a} signifies a co-producer producer.

Sample credits

- "Wall to Wall" contains a sample of "Let Me Be Your Angel" performed by Stacey Lattisaw.
- "1,2 1,2" contains a sample of "Ike's Mood I" performed by Isaac Hayes, and "Make the Music with Your Mouth, Biz" performed by Biz Markie.
- "Live to Die" contains a sample of "Pity For the Children" performed by Zulema.
- "Revory (Wraith)" contains a sample of "Where Can I Go" performed by Marlena Shaw.

== Personnel ==
- 2 Chainz – Featured Artist
- Arden "Keyz" Altino – Composer, Keyboards, Producer
- A$AP Rocky – Featured Artist
- Assassin – Featured Artist
- Ashley Bannister – Composer
- Stacy Barthe – Vocals
- Alex Bartnett – Assistant
- BlueRocks – Producer
- Matthew Burnett – Composer, Producer
- Busta Rhymes – Featured Artist
- Dragan "Chach" Cacinovic – Mastering
- Jeffrey Ethan Campbell – Composer
- Mel Carter – A&R, Product Manager
- Sheldon Clarke – Assistant
- Kasseem Dean – Composer
- Scoop DeVille – Producer
- Akene "the Champ" Dunkley – Producer
- Jerry "Wonda" Duplessis – Composer, Executive Producer, Producer
- DZL – Producer
- Tauheed Epps – Composer
- Estelle – Featured Artist
- Melanie Fiona – Featured Artist
- Justin Forsley – Guitar Engineer
- Jamie Frank – Composer
- French Montana – Featured Artist
- Frank G – Engineer, Producer
- Ghostface Killah – Featured Artist
- Larry D. Griffin, Jr. – Composer
- Frank Guastella – Composer
- Jessica Harley – A&R
- Koby Hass – Assistant
- Rene "Snaz" Hill – Composer
- Michael Holmes – Composer
- Garnik Hovannesian – Assistant
- Angela Hunte – Composer, Vocals
- Scram Jones – Engineer, Executive Producer, Producer, Vocals
- Sham "Sak Pase" Joseph – Composer, Producer
- Kelly G. – Vocals
- Karim Kharbouch – Composer
- Christina Lessa – Art Direction
- Deborah Mannis-Gardner – Sample Clearance
- Robert Megeehan – Assistant
- Elijah Molina – Composer
- John Newsom – Art Direction, Artwork
- Kris Peterson – A&R
- Lance Powell – Assistant, Engineer, Vocals
- Brittney Pressley – Vocals
- Raekwon – Art Direction, Executive Producer, Primary Artist, Producer
- Régine – Vocals
- Ralph Rhim – Vocals
- RoadsArt – Engineer, Mixing
- Andrew Robert – Assistant
- William Roberts – Composer
- Andrew Robertson – Assistant
- Liz Rodrigues – Composer, Featured Artist
- Natalie Rosario – Vocals
- Rick Ross – Featured Artist
- S1 – Producer
- Marc Schemer – Composer
- She Da God – Producer
- Snaz – Producer
- Snoop Dogg – Featured Artist
- Edward Supo – Composer
- Estelle Swaray – Composer
- Serge Tsai – Engineer, Mixing
- Eric Wiley – Graphic Design Layout
- Kevin "Kev-O" Wilson – Assistant
- Donperrion Woods – A&R, Executive Producer

== Charts ==
Chart (2015)	Peak position
US Billboard 200	60
US Top R&B/Hip-Hop Albums (Billboard)	7
US Top Rap Albums (Billboard)	6
US Independent Albums (Billboard)	4
US Indie Store Album Sales (Billboard)	14
