= Shaolin vs. Wu-Tang =

Studio album by Raekwon
- Released: March 8, 2011
- Recorded: 2010
- Genre: Hip-hop
- Length: 49:05
- Labels: Ice H20; EMI 50999 0 94906 2 8 E2-94906
- Producers: Raekwon (exec.); Scram Jones; Erick Sermon; Mathematics; Bronze Nazareth; Oh No; Cilvaringz; DJ Khalil; Tommy Nova; BT; Selasi; Bluerocks; Alchemist; Sean C; LV; Havoc; Kenny Dope; Xtreme

Raekwon chronology
Wu-Massacre (2010)	Shaolin vs. Wu-Tang (2011)	Fly International Luxurious Art (2015)

Wu-Tang Clan solo chronology
Apollo Kids (2010)	Shaolin vs. Wu-Tang (2011)	The Pilgrimage (2011)

Singles from Shaolin vs. Wu-Tang
- 1. "Butter Knives" Released: December 8, 2010; 2. "Shaolin vs. Wu-Tang" Released: January 11, 2011; 3. "Rock n Roll" Released: February 11, 2011

Shaolin vs. Wu-Tang is the fifth studio album by American rapper and Wu-Tang Clan-member Raekwon, released March 8, 2011, on Ice H20 and EMI Records. Guests for the album include Black Thought, Busta Rhymes, Ghostface Killah, GZA, Inspectah Deck, Lloyd Banks, Method Man, Nas, and Rick Ross, among others.

The album debuted at number 12 on the US Billboard 200 chart, selling 29,000 copies in its first week. It produced three singles, "Butter Knives", the title track and "Rock n Roll". Upon its release, Shaolin vs. Wu-Tang received positive reviews from most music critics, who complimented Raekwon's performance and commended him for his musical direction.

== Background ==
Due to the 8 Diagrams controversy, which took place in late 2007, Shaolin Vs. Wu-Tang was initially planned to be a Wu-Tang Clan group album, minus production from RZA. Raekwon later revealed that it would instead be his fifth studio album, and as originally intended, would not feature contributions from RZA. In regards to this decision, Raekwon clarified in an interview with Vibe "RZA doesn't have to be on every album. I wanted to give some other producers a chance. It's not about beef."

When Raekwon was asked about the album in an interview with Entertainment Weekly, he explained "It's not nothing derogatory towards Wu. It's just that Shaolin (i.e. Staten Island) is the place, Wu-Tang is the crew that came from that place. It's like me just going back to my history of being an emcee first, before I actually became part of Wu-Tang. I always give RZA that support as far as saying he brought Wu-Tang to the table. It was his philosophy. He picked certain dudes to be part of this group, and he said, 'This is what it's going to be called'. Before that, I was on the block. I was living in Shaolin. So this album just shows the street side of me, challenging the great side of Wu-Tang. Which is almost like how T.I. did T.I. vs. T.I.P. You're going to get sounds that relate to Wu-Tang. You're going to get sounds that relate to great Rae at his best shit, too. You're going to get a lot of animation as far as the skits are concerned. It's going to be a hot one. Everyone's going to love it."

== Recording ==
Writing and recording for Shaolin vs. Wu-Tang began in early 2010, and finished later that year, with the album's completion being announced on December 7, 2010, on the Shade 45 Morning Show. Unlike Raekwon's previous album Only Built 4 Cuban Linx... Pt. II, Shaolin vs. Wu-Tang contains more collaborations from non Wu-Tang members, such as Nas, Havoc, Black Thought, Lloyd Banks, Rick Ross, Raheem DeVaughn, and Estelle. In regards to their collaboration, Lloyd Banks explained in an interview with Vibe magazine how he had Raekwon as a guest on his song "Sooner Or Later" (from the H.F.M. 2 album), stating "I had the beat for a minute, just rocking, vibing with it. I wrote about three verses to it and the sample, the beat—everything just reminded me of the Wu-Tang sound… So I was like, it's gotta be somebody from the Wu. And I really respect what Rae's been doing recently. He killed it." Soon after this collaboration, Raekwon offered Banks a spot on the Scram Jones produced track "Last Trip to Scotland". Banks explained "Soon as I heard Raekwon's verse it was on some storytelling shit, so I already knew what I had to do with it. Rae is one of the best at that, so his verse opened up my mind. It wasn't like I had a blank beat to go off of."

Although a number of artists such as Scoop DeVille, Pete Rock, and Kanye West were reported to have worked on the album at one time or another, their contributions did not surface on the final version. In spite of Erick Sermon being inaccurately credited for production on the track "Every Soldier in the Hood", Oh No was later reported to be the song's producer.

== Release and promotion ==
In November 2010, Raekwon confirmed the album's March 8, 2011 release date. On December 7, 2010, Raekwon announced on the Shade 45 Morning Show that Shaolin vs. Wu-Tang is completed. Shaolin vs. Wu-Tang was released by Raekwon's Ice H2O imprint label and distributed through EMI, on March 8 in the United States and on March 7, 2011 in the United Kingdom. The album's first single, "Butter Knives", was produced by Bronze Nazareth and released on December 8, 2010. The album's title track was released as the second single on January 11, 2011. The song "Rock n Roll", featuring Jim Jones, Kobe and Ghostface Killah, was released as the album's third single in February. In March 2011, Raekwon promoted the album with a five-date concert tour in the United Kingdom.

== Reception ==
=== Commercial performance ===
The album debuted at number 12 on the US Billboard 200 chart, with first-week sales of 29,000 copies in the United States. It also charted at number three on Billboard's Top R&B/Hip-Hop Albums and at number two on its Rap Albums chart. In its second week, it sold 9,400 copies and dropped to number 45 on the Billboard 200. As of April 2015 the album has sold 79,000 copies in the United States. In the United Kingdom, it entered at number 21 on the Top RnB Albums chart.

=== Critical response ===
Professional ratings
Aggregate scores
Source	Rating
Metacritic	73/100
Review scores
Source	Rating
Consequence of Sound	4/5 stars
Entertainment Weekly	B+
Los Angeles Times	3.5/4 stars
NME	2/10
Pitchfork	7.9/10
PopMatters	7/10
RapReviews	8.5/10
Rolling Stone	3.5/5 stars
Slant Magazine	3.5/5 stars
Sputnikmusic	4/5

Shaolin vs. Wu-Tang received positive reviews from most music critics. At Metacritic, which assigns a normalized rating out of 100 to reviews from mainstream critics, the album received an average score of 73, based on 21 reviews, which indicates "generally favorable reviews". Los Angeles Times writer Jeff Weiss commended its producers for "faithfully re-creat[ing] the RZA's sword-swinging and bell-ringing aesthetic" and dubbed it Raekwon's "successful quest to return to the days when it was simple, blessed with the wisdom to know which philosophies work". John Kennedy of Vibe wrote that his "dense storytelling veers from Only Built 4 Cuban Linx 2's powder-white tales", concluding that "RZA's dark instrumentals are missed, but copious kung fu paraphernalia provide enough hard kicks and sample chops". Rolling Stone writer Jody Rosen commented that he "sounds at ease — as loquacious as ever, unfurling martial-arts-movie allusions and street-crime narratives in a weave of internal rhymes". BBC Online's Mike Diver praised his "typically dense and detailed wordplay", adding that "the sinister string samples and mystical talk of fantastical warriors is as good here as it's been on any previous Raekwon album".

However, Miguel Cullen of Clash expressed a mixed response towards its production and called it "patchy with flashes of killer bee sting". Ailbhe Malone of NME panned it as a "cringe worthy attempt at old school revival". Slant Magazine's Jesse Cataldo commented that Raekwon "sets out to co-opt and ape the signature Wu-Tang sound, a chop-socky blend of martial arts sound clips, gang-feud lyricism, and materialist nihilism", but viewed that "the scattershot collection of new names and old hands inevitably has mixed results" and concluded, "by attempting to break free from his group's guru, Raekwon inevitably only proves how vital RZA has been to nearly everything its members have produced, and how Raekwon has been unable to break free from his influence". Despite noting "some really awful bits, particularly 'Rock n' Roll'", David Morris of Tiny Mix Tapes gave it three-and-a-half out of five stars and complimented its "paranoid and high-tension" beats, as well as Raekwon's performance. Drowned in Sound's Kyle Ellison gave it a seven out of 10 rating and also viewed that it "is by no means perfect [...] 'Rock 'n' Roll' leaves me a little cold despite strong production, but the hits easily outweigh the misses".

Despite noting that "nothing quite comes close after 'Every Soldier'", Sputnikmusic's Sobhi Abdul-Rakhman gave the album four out of five stars and wrote that its guest rappers "all lend some of their best bars in recent history [...] these featured artists and nearly all of Raekwon's performances emphasize the lyrical focus of the record". Steve Juon of RapReviews praised the album's collaborations and commended Raekwon for "assembl[ing] talent for a Wu related album". Pitchfork Media's David Drake called it "a reverent record created for Wu fans, with all the requisite cinema samples and minor-key melodies", writing that "there is enough variation in the production and craft-conscious rhyme construction to make it a worthwhile project, one that unexpectedly stands out in Raekwon's catalog". David Amidon of PopMatters criticized its "DOOM-like arrangement", but praised Raekwon's "blunted, effortless delivery" and stated "Shaolin vs. Wu-Tang might not be an album that sinks its teeth in, but it's definitely breezy, entertaining and another worthy addition to Wu-Tang's ever-strengthening third or fourth wind".

== Track listing ==
Shaolin vs. Wu-Tang track listing
No.	Title	Writer(s)	Producer(s)	Length
1.	"Shaolin vs. Wu-Tang"	Corey Woods	Scram Jones	2:30
2.	"Every Soldier in the Hood" (featuring Method Man)	Woods; Clifford Smith, Jr.	Erick Sermon	2:54
3.	"Silver Rings" (featuring Ghostface Killah)	Woods; Dennis David Coles	Cilvaringz	1:48
4.	"Chop Chop Ninja" (featuring Inspectah Deck and Estelle)	Woods; Jason Richard Hunter	Bluerocks	4:24
5.	"Butter Knives"	Woods	Bronze Nazareth	2:47
6.	"Snake Pond"	Woods	Selasi	2:29
7.	"Crane Style" (featuring Busta Rhymes)	Woods; Trevor George Smith Jr.	Scram Jones	1:55
8.	"Rock 'N Roll" (featuring Ghostface Killah, Jim Jones and Kobe)	Woods; Coles; Joseph Guillermo Jones II	DJ Khalil	5:40
9.	"Rich & Black" (featuring Nas)	Woods; Nasir bin Olu Dara Jones; Deleno Matthews; Levar Coppin	Sean C & LV	3:35
10.	"From the Hills" (featuring Method Man and Raheem DeVaughn)	Woods; Smith, Jr.; Raheem DeVaughn	Kenny Dope	2:55
11.	"Last Trip to Scotland" (featuring Lloyd Banks)	Woods; Christopher Charles Lloyd	Scram Jones	2:42
12.	"Ferryboat Killaz"	Woods	The Alchemist	2:00
13.	"Dart School"	Woods	Mathematics	2:28
14.	"Molasses" (featuring Ghostface Killah and Rick Ross)	Woods; Coles; William Leonard Roberts II	Xtreme	4:13
15.	"The Scroll"	Woods	Evidence	2:34
16.	"Masters of Our Fate" (featuring Black Thought)	Woods; Tariq Luqmaan Trotter	Tommy Nova	3:22
17.	"Wu Chant (Outro)"	Woods	Tommy Nova	0:42
Total length:				49:05

iTunes bonus tracks
No.	Title	Writer(s)	Producer(s)	Length
18.	"Wu Crime" (featuring GZA and Killah Priest)	Woods; Gary Eldridge Grice; Walter Reed	BT	2:58
19.	"Your World & My World" (featuring Havoc)	Woods; Kejuan Waliek Muchita	Havoc	4:23
Total length:				56:26

Sample credits

- "Ferry Boat Killaz" contains a sample of "I Comme Icare" by Ennio Morricone
- "Dart School" contains a sample of "We People Who Are Darker Than Blue" by Curtis Mayfield
- "Molasses" contains a sample of "Troubles, Heartaches & Sadness" by Ann Peebles
- "The Scroll" contains a sample of "Apache" by The Incredible Bongo Band
- "Crane Style" contains a sample of "Shaft In Africa" by Johnny Pate
- "Snake Pond" contains a sample of "Breakthrough" by Isaac Hayes
- "Masters Of Our Fate" contains a sample of "Man With A Harmonica" by Ennio Morricone

== Personnel ==
Credits for Shaolin vs. Wu-Tang adapted from Allmusic.

- The Alchemist – producer
- Blue Rocks – producer
- Bronze Nazareth – producer
- Mel Carter – executive producer
- Cilvaringz – producer
- Dave Darlington – mixing
- Raheem DeVaughn – mixing
- DJ Khalil – producer
- DJ Mathematics – producer
- Havoc – producer
- Kenny Dope – producer
- Sean Frigot – layout

- Ed "Wolverine" Goldson – bass
- Brian Herman – engineer
- Yas Inoue – engineer
- Scram Jones – executive producer, producer
- Chris Nipz – graphic design, layout
- Raekwon – executive producer, quotation author
- Selasi – producer
- Oh No – producer
- Doug Wilson – mixing
- Donperrion Woods – A&R
- Kareem "Kay" Woods – executive producer
- Xtreme Beats – producer

== Charts ==
Chart (2011)	Peak position
UK R&B Albums	23
US Billboard 200	12
US Billboard Top R&B/Hip-Hop Albums	3
US Billboard Rap Albums	2
