= Workin (song) =

Single by Puff Daddy & The Family

from the album MMM (Money Making Mitch)
- Released: October 15, 2015
- Recorded: 2015
- Genre: Hip hop
- Length: 3:04
- Label: Bad Boy; Epic
- Songwriters: Sean Combs; Cydel Young; Chaz Bear
- Producer: Rob Holladay (Note: The remix is co-produced by Key Wane and Hit-Boy.)

Puff Daddy & The Family singles chronology
"Finna Get Loose" (2015)	"Workin" (2015)	"Money Ain't a Problem" (2015)

"Workin" is a song written by and performed by American rapper Sean "Puff Daddy" Combs. It was released on October 15, 2015 as the first single from Combs' commercial mixtape MMM (Money Making Mitch). The album version was remixed to include guest performances from Big Sean and Travis Scott, whose verses are accompanied by a slightly altered production by Key Wane and Hit-Boy.

== Music video ==
Both versions of the song's accompanying music video were directed by Hype Williams and released in November 2015 on Vevo and YouTube. Both videos have since been deleted, although unofficial re-uploads are still accessible on the site.

== Track listing ==
- Digital download
1. "Workin" (Explicit) — 3:04

== Remixes ==
On November 23, 2015, Combs' released a remix of the song also featuring Travis Scott and Big Sean at Vevo and YouTube account.
