= Anthony Acid =

American DJ, producer and remixer

- Birth name: Anthony Caputo
- Also known as: Epocalips, Injection, Life Line, The Lil' DJ
- Born: April 2, 1965 (age 59)
- Origin: Staten Island, New York, United States
- Genres: House, club, dance, disco
- Occupation(s): DJ, Producer, Remixer
- Website: Anthony Acid on Myspace

Anthony Acid (born Anthony Caputo; April 2, 1965) is an American DJ, producer and remixer. He has worked with the likes of Nast Nova, DJ Skribble, Brutal Bill, and Richie Santana.

== Discography ==
=== Mixed compilations ===
- Diva Grooves, Vol. 3 (1998)
- MDMA, Vol. 1 (1998)
- Best of Dance Mix USA, Vol. 2 (1998)
- MDMA, Vol. 2 (1999)
- MDMA, Vol. 3 (2000)
- Reddlite Continuous Mix (2000)
- MDMA: Reloaded (2004)

=== Singles/EPs ===
- "Rock and Boogie Down" (1989)
- "Phony Alibis" (1993)
- "Gimme Da Music" (1994)
- "Powerful" (1996)
- "Ha Ha/You Can't Make It" (1996)
- "Move" (1996)
- "Yes I Do" (1997)
- "Muzik Muzik Muzik" (1998)
- "Rock the Disco" (1999)
- "Infatuation" (2004)
- "Sweat" (2005)

=== Remixography ===
- "Over It" - Tiffany Affair
- "Colour of Love" - Amber
- "Toi El Moi" - Namie Amuro
- "Outta My Head" - A & S Project I
- "Special Love" - Bailey & Buzz
- "Turn It Out" - Peter Bailey
- "Take Me Home Tonight" - Candy Coated Chaos
- "Someday" - Charlotte
- "You Can Get It" - Critical
- "I Want Your Love" - Da Buddah Bangaz
- "Love This Way" - Eden's Crush
- "All Night Long" - Faith Evans & Puff Daddy
- "Not Over Yet" - Grace
- "Tush" - Ghostface
- "Higher & Higher" - GTS
- "Touch It" - Holly James
- "Brown Skin" - India.Arie
- "More Than Life" - Jana
- "I Need Your Love" - Jana
- "When I'm With You" - Jinnel
- "Angel" - Joée
- "Lovestoned" - Justin Timberlake
- "I'll House You 1998" - Jungle Brothers
- "Feel What You Want" - Kristine W
- "Fallin' In Love" - La Bouche
- "Find Love" - Layla
- "I Still Love You" - Lil Suzy
- "Never Leave You (Uh Oooh, Uh Oooh)" - Lumidee
- "Chelsea's On Fire (Paris Is Burning)" - Mannequeen
- "Day & Nite" - Marcy Faith
- "House Muzik" - Moody & Mayday
- "Time Waits For No One" - Morel Inc. & Mr. Mike
- "Pure Energy" - Nu Agenda
- "I'm Not In Love" - Olive
- "Outa Here" - Oris Jay
- "Ride the Trip" - Plasmic Honey
- "Most Girls" - Pink
- "Walking" - Pocket Size
- "The Chid (Inside)" - Qkumba Zoo
- "Gotta Tell You" - Samantha Mumba
- "House of Love" - Smooth Touch
- "Son of a Preacherman" - Soul S.K.
- "Baby" - Syren
- "I'm Sprung" - T-Pain
- "Pressure" - The Bomb Squad
- "Whatever You Like" - T.I. & Dave Navarro
- "The Itch" - Vitamin C
