= Tiffany Affair =

US musical group

- Origin: New York, New York, United States
- Genres: R&B, pop, hip hop
- Years active: 2006–2007
- Label: Reprise (2006–2007)
- Members: Ayanna; Bianca; Gabrielle
- Past members: Natasha
- Website: tiffanyaffair.com

Tiffany Affair was an American R&B girl group, composed of Ayanna (born 1988), Bianca (born 1988), Gabrielle (born 1990), and Natasha (born 1990). It was originally a quartet but then later became a trio when Natasha image on stage and back stage during private interviews. The girls were brought to Reprise's attention by guitarist Robert Randolph. They released their first single "Start a Fire", produced by Stargate.

They started performing in commercials and musical theaters at a young age. Their name originates from both a street in New Jersey called "Tiffany Blvd" and their original recording spot in a warehouse previously owned by Tiffany & Co. Their influences are John Legend, Alicia Keys, Destiny's Child, Gwen Stefani, Boyz II Men, and Christina Aguilera. Their debut album, tentatively titled Flavors, was originally scheduled for a fall 2006 release, was pushed to a mid-2007 date, then was ultimately scrapped.

On June 4, 2007, Tiffany Affair sang the "Star Spangled Banner" at the NASCAR Nextel Cup Autism Speaks 400, held at Dover International Speedway.

== Discography ==
=== Singles ===
- "Start a Fire" (2006)
- "Over It" (2007)
- "Fakin' It"
