= Miguel Cullen =

British poet and journalist

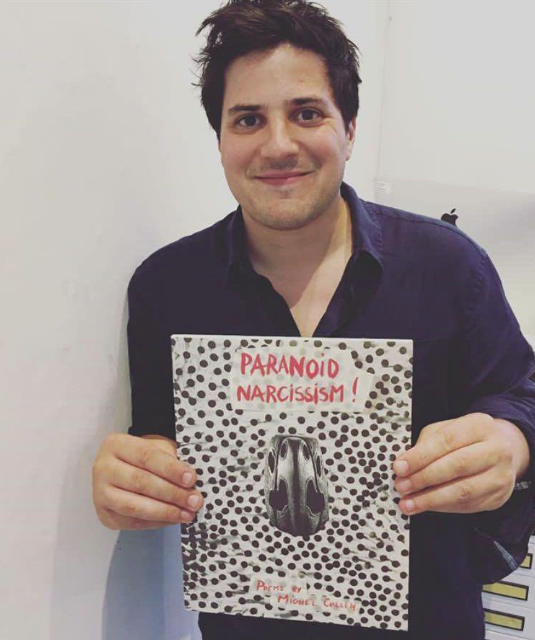
- Occupation(s): Poet, journalist
- Relatives: Michael Berry, Baron Hartwell (grandfather); William Berry, 1st Viscount Camrose (great-grandfather); F. E. Smith, 1st Earl of Birkenhead (great-grandfather); Francisco Hermógenes Ramos Mejía (great-great-great-great grandfather); Francisco Bernabé Madero (great-great-great grandfather)

Miguel Cullen is a British poet and journalist who lives in London.

== Background ==
Cullen was born into a mixed Argentinean-British household in World’s End, Chelsea in London in 1982.

== Poetry ==
Cullen's poetry has been described as "stoner poetry", and "baffling, brilliant, playful, and fraught with a sense of language potential and spin" by Ian Thomson, a "strange and wonderful garden of beautifully gnarled visions" (Camilla Grudova) (In Dreams of Diminished Responsibility, 2025)

Reviewing In Dreams of Diminished Responsibility in the Morning Star, Leo Boix wrote "I’m fascinated by Cullen’s ability to transport me into strangely constructed places where I don’t quite know what will happen next or who I will bump into".

Hologram (2022) received compliments from August Kleinzahler. A. N. Wilson is a fan of his work. His debut collection, Wave Caps (2014) was described in The Times Literary Supplement as "arresting, streetsmart ventriloquism".

Cullen worked with directors Ivar Wigan and Agustina Comedi to makes films which perform on Purple, Nowness and Flaunt. He has performed poetry on BBC Radio London .

== Journalism ==
Cullen was arts editor for The Catholic Herald. writing art reviews over an extended period. He has also published music and art journalism in VICE UK, The Independent, The Daily Telegraph, and long features on Dub music the Bristol underground scene, and the history of Black cinema in the UK for Clash. Recently he has written for WritersMosaic including a comic feature about Jafaican dialect and a feature about his cannabis-induced psychosis.

Cullen has also written some of few accounts of encounters with the American poet Frederick Seidel
