= Scram Jones =

American DJ and producer

- Also known as: SCRZA
- Born: Marc Shemer; November 5, 1977 (age 48)
- Origin: New Rochelle, New York, U.S.
- Genres: Hip hop; R&B
- Occupations: Disc jockey; record producer; rapper
- Instruments: Sampler; keyboards; turntable
- Label: Beast Music
- Website: Official website

Marc Shemer (born November 5, 1977), better known by his stage name Scram Jones, is a record producer, DJ and rapper from New Rochelle, New York. He has produced or co-written for music industry acts including Raekwon, Ghostface Killah, Styles P, Tragedy Khadafi, Jadakiss, Saigon, Dipset, Troy Ave, and Mariah Carey.

== Early life ==
He has been featured in The Source magazine's "Unsigned Hype" column. Scram Jones is Jewish.

== Career ==
=== Working as a DJ ===
After teaching himself how to scratch, mix, and blend, Scram Jones won second place in the 2003 East Coast Finals of Guitar Center's DJ Battles. Scram then went on to receive three consecutive nominations for Best Mixtape Producer at the respected Justo Mixtape Awards. He also hosted his own weekly radio show called "The Chop Shop" for 4 years on the WICB radio station in New York. Scram has since been DJing for Raekwon of Wu-Tang Clan, Kool G Rap, N.O.R.E., and Saigon. He has also performed in various clubs around the world and in New York.

=== Working as a record producer ===
Scram's first break as a producer came with rapper Tragedy Khadafi. He served as A&R director for Tragedy's album Still Reporting and produced 4 tracks on the project, two featuring Havoc from Mobb Deep. He then went on to produce Jae Millz's first single "No, No, No" and its remix with rappers Cam'Ron and T.I., the Terror Squad single "Yeah, Yeah, Yeah" and Black Rob's single "Ready". He also produced Remy Ma's buzz single "Lights, Camera, Action". Other notable tracks include: Lloyd Banks' song "Work Magic" featuring Young Buck and The Notorious B.I.G.'s "Just a Memory" featuring Clipse. Scram Jones was nominated for a Grammy award for his production on the song "Your Girl" from Mariah Carey's multi-platinum album The Emancipation of Mimi.

=== Working as an MC ===
As an emcee, Scram released his first record "Liquid Heat" which gained underground buzz in 1999. In 2000, he helped start the first weekly open-mic show in NYC: "End of the Weak", where he performed on stage as both an MC and DJ. In 2001, Scram won first place in Tommy Hilfiger's National Demo Contest. Hilfiger launched a national campaign featuring Scram Jones, providing a platform to promote his music. In 2002, Scram was featured in The Source magazine's "Unsigned Hype". Scram Jones has appeared in various hip-hop magazines, such as XXL, Vibe, and Scratch Magazine. Additionally, he has worked with Pharrell on Latin artist Sergio Veneno's project. Scram is currently managing Veneno and has helped to earn him a deal with Star Trak and Interscope. Scram has also performed and collaborated with the multi-platinum Latin group Aventura.

== Discography (as lead artist) ==
=== Mixtapes ===
- 2004: Loose Cannons
- 2011: The Hat Trick
- 2013: Dead Giveaway
- 2023: Rise of The Sliverback

=== Singles ===
- 1999: "Liquid Heat"
- 1999: "Shady 380 Lady"
- 2004: "Bang Bang"
- 2005: "Speed Demons"
- 2005: "Speed Demons"
- 2005: "12 Years Ago"
- 2005: "64 Bit"
- 2011: "Back in the Park"
- 2011: "One September Day"
- 2011: "Boom Bap Jones"
- 2017: "NYC Driveby" (Feat. Uncle Murda, Dave East & Styles P)

== Production discography ==
=== 2003 ===
Mareko - White Sunday

- "Don't Need Protection" (featuring Scram Jones & Sadat X)

Tragedy Khadafi - Still Reportin'...

- "Neva Die Alone Pt.2"
- "The Code" (featuring Havoc of Mobb Deep & Littles)
- "Fall Back" (featuring Havoc of Mobb Deep)
- "Crying On The Inside"

=== 2004 ===
Lloyd Banks - The Hunger For More

- "Work Magic" (featuring Young Buck)

X-Ecutioners - Revolutions

- "Back To Back" (featuring Scram Jones & Saigon)

Terror Squad - True Story

- "Yeah Yeah Yeah"

=== 2005 ===
Mariah Carey - The Emancipation of Mimi

- "Your Girl"

Dipset - More Than Music, Vol. 1

- "40th Boys"
- "If Only You Believe"

Ras Kass - Institutionalized

- "Shine" (featuring Vis A Vis)

Black Rob - The Black Rob Report

- "Ready"

The Notorious B.I.G. - Duets: The Final Chapter

- "Just A Memory" (featuring The Clipse)

=== 2006 ===
Remy Ma - There's Something About Remy

- "Lights, Camera, Action"

Capone - Menace 2 Society

- "No Problem"

Dipset - The Movement Moves On

- "Yall Can't Live His Life"

N.O.R.E. - Norminacal - The Underbelly Mixtape

- "Bad Man" (featuring Beanie Sigel)

Saigon - Warning Shots

- "Let A Nigga Know"
- "N.Y. Streetz"

Scram Jones - Loose Cannons (The Mixtape)

- All Tracks

=== 2007 ===
Smitty - The Voice Of The Ghetto

- "Pop Quiz"

Jae Millz - The Time Is Now

- "Lick Off A Shot"

Tony Touch - ReggaeTony 2

- "Ando Fumando" (featuring Sergio Veneno)

Ghostface Killah - The Big Doe Rehab

- "Yapp City" (featuring Sung God & Trife)
- "White Linen Affair" (Toney Awards) (featuring Shawn Wigs)
- "Not Your Average Girl" (featuring Shareefa)

=== 2008 ===
Immortal Technique - The 3rd World

- "Mistakes"

Scarface - Emeritus

- "Emeritus"

=== 2009 ===
Raekwon - Only Built 4 Cuban Linx II

- "Broken Safety" (featuring Jadakiss & Styles P)
- "Walk Wit Me"
- "Never Used To Matter" (featuring Bun B)
- "Kiss the Ring" (featuring Inspectah Deck and Masta Killa)

=== 2010 ===
Method Man, Raekwon & Ghostface Killah - Wu-Massacre

- "Youngstown Heist"
- "Its That Wu Shit"

Canibus - C of Tranquility

- "Captn Cold Crush"

Ghostface Killah - Apollo Kids

- "Starkology"

Fat Joe - The Darkside Vol. 1

- "Intro"

=== 2011 ===
Raekwon - Shaolin vs. Wu-Tang

- "Last Train To Scotland" (featuring Lloyd Banks)
- "Crane Style" (featuring Busta Rhymes)
- "Kiss the Ring" (featuring Inspectah Deck & Masta Killa)

CF - Storm Mode

- "Walk With Me" (CF Version)

=== 2013 ===
Raekwon - Lost Jewlry

- "Prince of Thieves"
- "Young Boy Penalties"
- "Came Up"

Styles P - Float

- All tracks

Raekwon & Scram Jones - The Chef vs The Beast

- All tracks

Troy Ave - New York City: The Album

- "Cigar Smoke" (featuring King Sevin)
- "Hot Out"

=== 2014 ===
Sammy Adams - WIZZY

- "Plate It"

Dave East - "Straight Outta Harlem"

- Make A Dolla*

=== 2015 ===
Raekwon - "F.I.L.A. (Fly International Luxurious Art)"

- "Nautilus"
- "F.I.L.A. World" (Feat. 2 Chainz)
- "4 In The Morning" (Feat. Ghostface Killah)
- "Internationalism"

Jadakiss - "Top 5 Dead or Alive"

- Rain* (Feat. Nas & Styles P)
- Baby* (Feat. Dyce Payne)

Capone-N-Noreaga - "Lessons"

- Foul 120* (Feat. Tragedy Khadafi & Raekwon)

=== 2016 ===
Termanology - Cameo King III

- "Labor Day" (featuring Action Bronson, Chace Infinite, Wais P, Rob White, & Freddie Gibbs) (* as rapper. Song was produced by Statik Selektah)

=== 2017 ===
Eminem - Revival

- "In Your Head"

=== 2020 ===
The Lox - Living Off Xperience

- "Bout Shit" (featuring DMX)

=== Unknown ===
Other songs:

- Freeway - "Stand Up"
- Peedi Crakk - "It Don't Stop"
- Rhymefest - "Coming For You"
- Kool G Rap - "This is How We Do NYC"
- Ray Cash - "E-Room"
