= Smooth Touch =

Smooth Touch is an American dance music duo of the producers and DJs Erick Morillo and Kenny Lewis. In 1993, they reached #1 on the US Hot Dance Music/Club Play chart, with the song "House Of Love (In My House)". The track peaked at #58 in the UK Singles Chart in April 1994.

== See also ==
- List of number-one dance hits (United States)
- List of artists who reached number one on the US Dance chart
