= Megan Rochell =

American contemporary R&B singer

- Born: Megan Rochell Nieves; August 19, 1985 (age 40)
- Origin: Brooklyn, New York, U.S.
- Genres: R&B
- Occupations: Singer; songwriter
- Years active: 2001–present
- Labels: Def Jam; Darkchild Productions; EMI Blackwood Publishing
- Website: Megan Rochell

Megan Rochell is an American contemporary R&B singer, who was formerly signed to Def Jam Recordings. After parting ways with the label, she signed a production deal with producer Rodney Jerkins of Darkchild Productions. Rochell also signed a publishing deal with EMI/Blackwood publishing within the same time frame.

== Biography ==
At the age of 11, Rochell was a five-time winner on Showtime at the Apollo. Several years later, she met Philadelphia International's Leon Huff and started working on her recording career. One day outside of Philadelphia International, she met Boyz II Men's Nathan Morris and sang for him which prompted Morris to sign her to his management company. Then Rochell secured herself a deal with Def Jam Records. She was enrolled at Rowan University, originally as a business major, then switching to secondary elementary education before dropping out after getting the record deal with Def Jam.

Rochell's debut album, You, Me and the Radio, featured collaborations from Rodney Jerkins, Ne-Yo, Fabolous, the Underdogs, and Stargate. The album was scheduled for released on June 20, 2006, but was never released. Rochell chalked the industry changing, along with the management at Def Jam, with Jay Z becoming president, Rihanna being the big new artist, and many other new artists they were trying to market.

However, the project leaked in full online shortly after the project's shelving via the promotional CD. The following year, she collaborated with rapper Peedi on the single "Take Me Home."

In 2008, she released Vibe Love Party mixtape and promoted through on her MySpace page. Additionally, she collaborated with Skinny & Scales on the single "We're Gonna Make It" released in 2009.

In 2015, her digital single "Hell Nah" was released on December 28, 2015. It was later re-released on February 4, 2016, through different label distribution.

In 2016, Rochell released a new single called "I'm Busy!" on digital services. Later that year, she self-released her debut album digitally onto sites such as Apple Music, Spotify and Amazon Music with a slightly altered tracklist and various bonus tracks not originally available on the original album. It received a limited vinyl release in 2018.

In 2017, she released her first EP, Insight independently and discussed she was working on a girls-only mixtape. Additionally, she spent some time as a songwriter for other artists such as Kehlani, K. Michelle and Keyshia Cole.

In late 2018, she released two digital singles "X" and "Because of Love" ahead of her new EP New Wave Music, which was released on November 22.

== Personal life ==
She has a son named Austin with her husband Sam Crush. She cites Brandy, Lauryn Hill, Mary J. Blige, Aaliyah, Whitney Houston, and Mariah Carey as influences.

== Discography ==
=== Albums ===
- 2006: You, Me and the Radio

=== Mixtapes ===
- 2008: Vibe Love Party

=== EPs ===
- 2017: Insight
- 2018: New Wave Music

=== Singles ===
Year	Title	Chart positions		Album
Year	Title	U.S. R&B	Rhythmic Top 40	Album
2006	"The One You Need" (feat. Fabolous)	42	—	You, Me and the Radio
2006	"Floating"	55	—	You, Me and the Radio
2007	"Let Go"	—	34	You, Me and the Radio
2007	"Take Me Home" (with Peedi)	—	—	non-album track
2009	"We're Gonna Make It" (with Skinny & Scales)	—	—	non-album track
2015	"Hell Nah"	—	—	non-album track
2016	"I'm Busy!"	—	—	non-album track
2018	"X"	—	—	non-album track
2018	"Because of Love"	—	—	non-album track
