= Raekwon =

American rapper (born 1970)

- Raekwon in 2015

Background information
- Also known as: Raekwon the Chef; Shallah Raekwon; Lex Diamond
- Born: Corey Quontrell Woods; January 12, 1970 (age 56); Brooklyn, New York City, U.S.
- Origin: Staten Island, New York City, U.S.
- Genre: Hip-hop
- Occupation: Rapper
- Works: Discography
- Years active: 1991–present
- Labels: Aftermath; Ice H20; Loud; RCA; Mass Appeal
- Member of: Wu-Tang Clan
- Website: officialraekwon.com

Corey Quontrell Woods (born January 12, 1970), better known by his stage name Raekwon (/reɪˈkwɒn/ ray-KWON), is an American rapper. He rose to prominence as a founding member of the hip-hop group Wu-Tang Clan, which achieved mainstream success following the release of their debut album, Enter the Wu-Tang (36 Chambers), in 1993. Raekwon would subsequently pursue a solo career, releasing his first solo album, entitled Only Built 4 Cuban Linx..., in 1995. The album received critical acclaim, and is regarded by many critics as one of the greatest hip-hop albums of all time, as well as a staple of 1990s rap.

Whereas his next two albums, Immobilarity in 1999 and then The Lex Diamond Story in 2003, drew mixed reviews, his fourth album, long delayed, Only Built 4 Cuban Linx... Pt. II, released in September 2009, was likened to The Godfather 2. Recognized for his "street epics" that are "straightforward yet linguistically rich," Raekwon is ranked among leading rappers. Meanwhile, he founded the record label ICE H20 Records.

== Early life ==
Raekwon was born Corey Woods in Brownsville, Brooklyn, where he was raised by his mother during his early childhood. His father was an addict. Raekwon only met his father once when he was six years old. On that occasion, his father brought him to meet his paternal grandmother (also for the first time) and then snuck out of the apartment. Raekwon moved with his mother to Staten Island after his mother was robbed. They were living in Park Hill by the time Raekwon was adolescent.

Raekwon attributes the name Raekwon to the Five-Percent Nation, an offshoot of the Nation of Islam, when he was a "young kid." He converted to Islam in 2009.

Growing up, he witnessed his mother being hit and abused by different men, an experience which he said "affected [him] a lot." As a young man, his mother kicked him out of their Park Hill home when Raekwon got into an argument with her boyfriend and his mother sided with the boyfriend. During this time, he spiraled into a pattern of hopelessness and violent behavior. He became addicted to cocaine and crack cocaine until he became aware of how the crack epidemic was affecting those around him, at which point "it was an automatic stop."

Raekwon and rap partner Ghostface Killah attended junior high school together on Staten Island. Raekwon attended New Dorp High School, where he befriended rappers Remedy, Method Man and Inspectah Deck.

After being caught in a crossfire and accidentally shot four times, Raekwon began rapping in earnest. He later described being shot as an "important eye opener."

== Career ==
=== Wu-Tang Clan ===
Woods first rapped as Sha Raider. In 1992, he joined the Wu-Tang Clan, an originally nine-member rap group drawing mainly from Staten Island but also from the Brooklyn boroughs of New York City. He rapped as Raekwon the Chef, and also used the aliases Lex Diamond, Shallah Raekwon, and Louis Rich.

As recording artists, the Wu-Tang Clan debuted with the November 1993 album Enter the Wu-Tang (36 Chambers), which was later certified platinum. Its single "C.R.E.A.M." reached No. 8 on the Billboard rap chart. Wu-Tang Forever, a double album, followed in 1997, and was certified 4x multi-platinum. Amid other solo albums by its members, the group released The W in 2000, Iron Flag in 2001, and 8 Diagrams in 2007.

=== Only Built 4 Cuban Linx... ===
In 1994, Raekwon signed a solo deal with Loud Records and released his debut solo single "Heaven & Hell" for the soundtrack to the film Fresh. His first solo album, Only Built 4 Cuban Linx..., was released on August 1, 1995. Sales lagged his fellow Wu-Tang member Method Man's Tical. Raekwon's album drew rave reviews, however, and it was promptly recognized as a classic.

The album's narrative struggle is set to imagery of criminal activity, largely cocaine trafficking, and emergence from it into the good life. Wu-Tang member and house producer RZA, who produced the entire album, called it "like a crime mafia story." Wu-Tang member Ghostface Killah rapped in over half of the album's tracks, and the two wrote some lyrics in Barbados and Miami. It also follows a cinematic narrative, inspired by mob and kung-fu movies and a plethora of references and samples in which the main rapping lines with an on-going story of struggle and success.

Raekwon explained the lyrics' context as "trying to get out the hood. We wanted to buy the most expensive cars and jewelry and different things like that." The album, he perceived, "was only built for a certain lifestyle or people that understood that language. But eventually, it would break off to people looking at it as a movie and respecting it saying, 'Yo, wow! This is authentic. This is something that never been done before' " Only Built 4 Cuban Linx... debuted at No. 4 on the popular albums chart the Billboard 200, and at No. 2 on Billboard's Top R&B/Hip-Hop Albums chart. It shipped about 130,000 copies in its first week, and was certified gold, at least 500,000 copies shipped, two months later, October 1995. And finally Certified Platinum in 2020.

=== Immobilarity and The Lex Diamond Story ===
After Only Built 4 Cuban Linx..., Raekwon featured on R&B group Allure's debut or 1997 album. He also featured alongside rappers Nas, Jadakiss, and Big Pun in rapper Fat Joe's song "John Blaze." Raekwon's next album, Immobilarity, lacking RZA's record production and Ghostface Killah features, was issued in 1999 to mixed reviews. The Lex Diamond Story, released in 2003 under major label Universal Records, also drew mixed reviews, most critics unimpressed while user reviews widely varied. Raekwon cited a low promotional budget.

=== Only Built 4 Cuban Linx... Pt. II ===
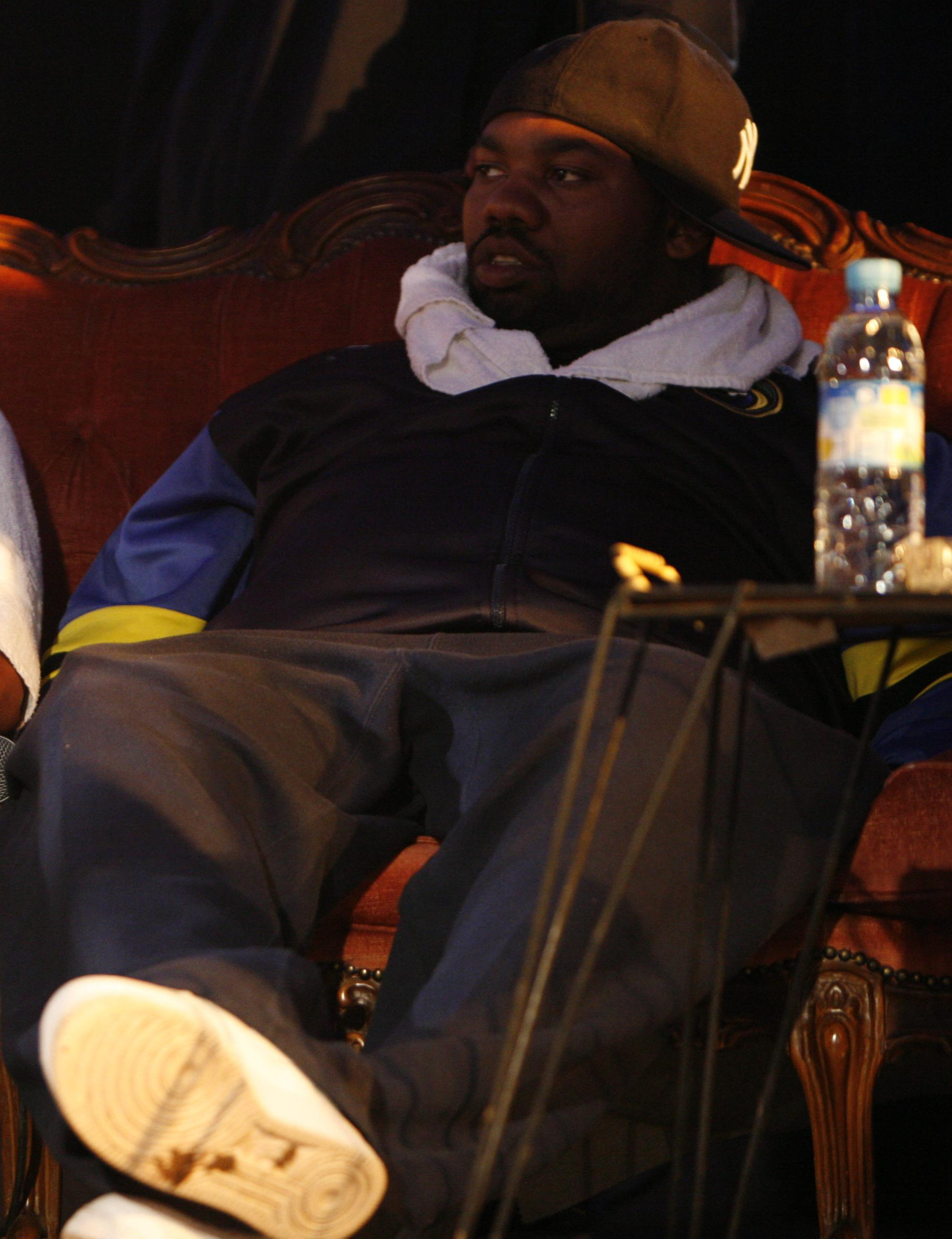
Raekwon in 2008

Raekwon planned to release Only Built 4 Cuban Linx... Pt. II through record producer Dr. Dre's label Aftermath Entertainment in 2007. Raekwon credited the executive producer Busta Rhymes with restoring his "Cuban Linx mindset," while most tracks were produced by RZA, who likened collaboration with Dr. Dre to "yin and yang" styles.

Amid many delays, as for sample clearance, the Only Built For Cuban Linx... Pt. II track "Surgical Gloves" had been leaked already when the album was released by Raekwon's label, Ice H20, under major label EMI's distribution on September 8, 2009. The album features Wu-Tang members and affiliates as well as Slick Rick, Jadakiss, Busta Rhymes, Beanie Sigel, and others.

Also in September 2009, MTV ranked Raekwon tenth among "hottest" rappers. In December, HipHopDx's 2009 awards named Only Built For Cuban Linx... Pt. II album of the year, calling it "the Hip Hop equivalent to The Godfather 2, with Rae as revitalized as Marlon was". Raekwon won Emcee of the Year—the prior year, Nas won—while HipHopDX staff explained,

Raekwon brought it back to lyrical, dope rap. He released an album that spoke to teens, twenty-somethings, thirty-somethings, and beyond. Without compromising, the Chef made an edgy Hip Hop record that refused to bastardize the catalog he laid down 15 years ago. On top of that, Rae (along with Ghostface) was a go-to for numerous rappers making albums, ranging from the Playaz Circle to Jadakiss to BK One. That's beyond real, as was a year filled with performing in arenas, clubs and even churches. When it came to mastering the ceremony, Rae had 'em all following the leader.

— HipHopDX

=== Shaolin vs. Wu-Tang ===
After the critical and relative commercial success of Only Built 4 Cuban Linx... Pt. II, Raekwon collaborated with Method Man and Ghostface Killah for Wu-Massacre, a short trio album designed to showcase unity within the group. Following this release, Raekwon resurrected talk of Shaolin vs. Wu-Tang, a project announced in 2007, originally planned as a Wu-Tang album, minus RZA, due to his response to the previous group album 8 Diagrams. Raekwon forwarded his projects continuously through his growing label Icewater. He both worked on his own project while signing other underground artists.

Although not a Wu-Tang Clan project, Shaolin vs. Wu-Tang was released in March 2011, serving as Raekwon's fifth solo LP. As originally planned, RZA did not participate on the project, however, several other Wu-Tang members made appearances, as well as Black Thought, Nas and Rick Ross, among others. Raekwon revealed that he intends on eventually releasing a third installment to the Only Built 4 Cuban Linx... albums.

=== Lost Jewlry, Fly International Luxurious Art, The Wild, and present ===
In 2012, Raekwon launched his own record label, Ice H20 Records. Raekwon announced on November 30, 2012, that he would soon release an EP entitled Lost Jewlry. On December 20, he released "Never Can Say Goodbye", which did not end up on the EP. Lost Jewlry was released on January 15, 2013. It featured guest appearances from Maino and Freddie Gibbs, as well as production from Scram Jones, among others.

On January 1, 2013, Raekwon announced that the title of his next album would be F.I.L.A., an acronym for Fly International Luxurious Art, and that it would be released during the second quarter of 2013. He would later specify a release month of September 2013. Following the release of the first single "All About You", Raekwon intimated that the album would be released in January 2014; it finally saw release on April 28, 2015. In November 2016, Raekwon announced that a new album was complete.

On March 24, 2017, Raekwon released a studio album, The Wild, his first not to feature collaborations with fellow members of the Wu-Tang Clan. Critical reception was positive, with Pitchfork saying the album was stronger than Fly, which it alleged had a "bloated roster". Consequence of Sound agreed, saying The Wild was largely understood as a return to form by Raekwon, with fewer guest appearances by other artists than usual and more focus on Raekwon's long-established style, albeit with the "maximalist modern production" he had employed on Fly.

Raekwon was featured as a guest on the intro to the WWCD compilation by Griselda. On August 1, 2020, Elliot Wilson, of Tidal and Rap Radar, announced Raekwon will be releasing Only Built 4 Cuban Linx 3 soon. Raekwon provided guest vocals alongside Ghostface Killah and Busta Rhymes on "Science Class", a song off Griselda leader Westside Gunn's 2022 mixtape 10.

Raekwon has most recently released an album titled "The Emperor's New Clothes", featuring artists such as Conway the Machine, Benny the Butcher and Westside Gunn, with other features coming mainly from other members of Wu-Tang Clan.

== Discography ==
Studio albums

- Only Built 4 Cuban Linx... (1995)
- Immobilarity (1999)
- The Lex Diamond Story (2003)
- Only Built 4 Cuban Linx... Pt. II (2009)
- Shaolin vs. Wu-Tang (2011)
- Fly International Luxurious Art (2015)
- The Wild (2017)
- The Emperor’s New Clothes (2025)

Collaboration albums

- Wu-Massacre (with Method Man & Ghostface Killah) (2010)
