= Ghostface Killah discography =

- Ghostface Killah performing at Virginia Commonwealth University, 2007.
- Studio albums: 13
- Compilation albums: 5
- Singles: 20
- Music videos: 18
- Collaboration albums: 9

This is the discography of Wu-Tang Clan member Ghostface Killah, an American rapper.

== Albums ==
=== Studio albums ===
List of studio albums, with selected chart positions, sales figures and certifications
Title	Album details	Chart positions				Sales	Certifications
Title	Album details	US	US R&B/HH	US Rap	UK	Sales	Certifications
Ironman	Released: October 29, 1996; Label: Razor Sharp, Epic Records; Formats: CD, LP, cassette, digital download	2	1	–	38	US: 953,000	RIAA: Platinum; BPI: Silver; MC: Gold
Supreme Clientele	Released: February 8, 2000; Label: Razor Sharp, Epic, SME Records; Formats: CD, LP, cassette, digital download	7	2	–	–	US: 657,000	RIAA: Gold
Bulletproof Wallets	Released: November 13, 2001; Label: Epic Records; Formats: CD, LP, digital download	34	2	–	–	US: 297,000	
The Pretty Toney Album	Released: April 20, 2004; Label: Def Jam; Formats: CD, LP, digital download	6	4	1	–	US: 346,000	
Fishscale	Released: March 28, 2006; Label: Def Jam; Formats: CD, LP, digital download	4	2	2	–	US: 339,000	
More Fish	Released: December 12, 2006; Label: Def Jam; Formats: CD, LP, digital download	71	13	6	–	US: 109,000	
The Big Doe Rehab	Released: December 4, 2007; Label: Def Jam; Formats: CD, LP, digital download	41	8	5	–	US: 117,000	
Ghostdini: Wizard of Poetry in Emerald City	Released: September 29, 2009; Label: Def Jam; Formats: CD, LP, digital download	28	6	3	–	US: 64,000	
Apollo Kids	Released: December 21, 2010; Label: Def Jam; Formats: CD, digital download	120	28	10	–	US: 47,000	
36 Seasons	Released: December 9, 2014; Label: Tommy Boy; Formats: CD, LP, digital download	94	10	6	–		
Ghostface Killahs	Released: September 13, 2019; Label: Music Generation Corp; Formats: CD, LP, digital download	–	–	–	–		
Set the Tone (Guns & Roses)	Released: May 10, 2024; Label: Mass Appeal; Formats: CD, LP, cassette, digital download	–	–	–	–		
Supreme Clientele 2	Released: August 22, 2025; Label: Mass Appeal; Formats: CD, LP, cassette, digital download	–	–	–	–		

=== Collaboration albums ===
List of collaboration albums, with selected chart positions
Title	Album details	Chart positions		
Title	Album details	US	US R&B/HH	US Rap
718 (with Theodore Unit)	Released: August 3, 2004; Label: Sure Shot	–	66	–
Put It on the Line (with Trife Diesel)	Released: November 18, 2005; Label: Starks Enterprise	–	–	–
Wu-Massacre (with Raekwon and Method Man)	Released: March 30, 2010; Label: Def Jam	12	6	2
Wu Block (with Sheek Louch)	Released: November 27, 2012; Label: E1	73	15	9
Twelve Reasons to Die (with Adrian Younge)	Released: April 16, 2013; Label: Soul Temple, RED Distribution; Formats: CD, LP, cassette, digital download	27	7	6
Sour Soul (with BadBadNotGood)	Released: February 17, 2015; Label: Lex	109	9	6
Twelve Reasons to Die II (with Adrian Younge)	Released: July 10, 2015; Label: Linear Labs; Formats: CD, LP, digital download	–	14	–
The Lost Tapes (with Big Ghost Ltd.)	Released: October 5, 2018; Label: Cleopatra	111	25	23
Czarface Meets Ghostface (with Czarface)	Released: February 15, 2019; Label: Silver Age	–	–	–

=== Compilation albums ===
Title	Album details	Chart positions
Title	Album details	US Rap
Shaolin's Finest	Released: August 1, 2003; Label: Epic	–
Hidden Darts: Special Edition	Released: March 13, 2007; Label: Starks Enterprise	–
The Wallabee Champ	Released: March 25, 2008; Label: Starks Enterprise	–
Ghostdeini the Great	Released: December 16, 2008; Label: Def Jam	14
Best of Ghostface Killah	Released: May 27, 2014; Label: Def Jam	–

== Singles ==
=== As lead artist ===
Title	Year	Chart positions				Album
Title	Year	US	US R&B/HH	US Rap	UK	Album
"All That I Got Is You" (featuring Mary J. Blige)	1996	–	51	–	11	Ironman
"Daytona 500" (featuring Raekwon and Cappadonna)	1996	–	–	–	–	Ironman
"Cobra Clutch"	1998	–	–	–	–	The Swarm
"Apollo Kids" (featuring Raekwon)	2000	–	121	32	–	Supreme Clientele
"Cherchez La Ghost" (featuring U-God)	2000	98	42	3	–	Supreme Clientele
"Never Be the Same Again" featuring Raekwon and Carl Thomas)	2001	–	65	21	–	Bulletproof Wallets
"Ghost Showers"	2001	–	77	11	–	Bulletproof Wallets
"Guerilla Hood" (with Theodore Unit)	2003	–	–	–	–	718
"Tush" (featuring Missy Elliott)	2004	–	–	–	34	The Pretty Toney Album
"Run" (featuring Jadakiss)	2004	–	–	–	–	The Pretty Toney Album
"Milk Em'" (with Trife da God featuring Strange Fruit Project)	2005	–	–	–	–	Put It on the Line
"Be Easy" (featuring Trife da God)	2005	–	91	–	–	Fishscale
"Back Like That" (featuring Ne-Yo)	2006	61	14	11	46	Fishscale
"We Celebrate" (featuring Kid Capri)	2008	–	–	–	–	The Big Doe Rehab
"Baby" (featuring Raheem DeVaughn)	2009	–	–	–	–	Ghostdini: Wizard of Poetry in Emerald City
"Forever"	2009	–	–	–	–	Ghostdini: Wizard of Poetry in Emerald City
"Let's Stop Playin'" (featuring John Legend)	2009	–	–	–	–	Ghostdini: Wizard of Poetry in Emerald City
"Guest House" (featuring Fabolous)	2009	–	–	–	–	Ghostdini: Wizard of Poetry in Emerald City
"Our Dreams" (with Method Man and Raekwon)	2010	–	–	–	–	Wu-Massacre
"Mef vs. Chef 2" (with Method Man and Raekwon)	2010	–	–	–	–	Wu-Massacre
"Miranda" (with Method Man and Raekwon)	2010	–	–	–	–	Wu-Massacre
"Dangerous" (with Method Man and Raekwon)	2010	–	–	–	–	Wu-Massacre
"2getha Baby"	2010	–	–	–	–	The Apollo Kids
"The Rise of the Ghostface Killah"	2013	–	–	–	–	Twelve Reasons to Die
"Six Degrees" (with BadBadNotGood, featuring Danny Brown)	2014	–	–	–	–	Sour Soul
"Lively Hood" (with MF Doom as Doomstarks)	2015	–	–	–	–	2015 Adult Swim Singles Program
"Claudine" (with Method Man, Mathematics and Nicole Bus)	2023	–	–	–	–	Non-album single
"Scar Tissue" (with Nas)	2024	–	–	–	–	Set the Tone (Guns & Roses)
"No Face" (with Kanye West)	2024	–	–	–	–	Set the Tone (Guns & Roses)

=== As featured artist ===
Title	Year	Chart positions				Certifications	Album
Title	Year	US	US R&B/Hip-Hop	US Rap	UK	Certifications	Album
"Heaven & Hell" (with Raekwon)	1994	–	–	–	–		Fresh (Soundtrack)/Only Built 4 Cuban Linx...
"Ice Cream" (with Raekwon, Method Man and Cappadonna)	1995	–	–	–	–		Only Built 4 Cuban Linx...
"Criminology" (with Raekwon)	1995	–	–	–	–		Only Built 4 Cuban Linx...
"4th Chamber" (GZA featuring Ghostface Killah, Killah Priest and RZA)	1995	–	–	–	–		Liquid Swords
"I Want You for Myself" (Remix) (Another Level featuring Ghostface Killah)	1999	–	–	–	2		Another Level
"Stand Up" (Charli Baltimore featuring Ghostface Killah)	1999	–	–	9	–		Cold as Ice
"Ms. Fat Booty 2" (Mos Def featuring Ghostface Killah)	2000	–	98	15	64	BPI: Silver	Lyricist Lounge 2
"Super Model" (Cappadonna featuring Ghostface Killah)	2001	–	–	–	–		The Yin and the Yang
"Special Delivery" (Remix) (G. Deb featuring Ghostface Killah, Keith Murray, P. Diddy and Craig Mack)	2002	–	–	–	–		We Invented the Remix
"Thrilla" (Cassius featuring Ghostface Killah)	2002	–	–	–	–		Au Rêve
"Saian" (Saïan Supa Crew featuring RZA and Ghostface Killah)	2003	–	–	–	–		The World According to RZA
"Ooh Wee" (Mark Ronson featuring Ghostface Killah, Nate Dogg and Trife Diesel)	2003	–	–	–	–		Here Comes the Fuzz / Honey (soundtrack)
"On My Knees" (The 411 featuring Ghostface Killah)	2004	–	–	–	4		Between the Sheets
"New Wu" (Raekwon featuring Ghostface Killah and Method Man)	2009	–	–	–	–		Only Built 4 Cuban Linx... Pt. II
"House of Flying Daggers" (Raekwon featuring Ghostface Killah, Inspectah Deck and Method Man)	2009	–	–	–	–		Only Built 4 Cuban Linx... Pt. II
"New York" (Remix) (Paloma Faith featuring Ghostface Killah)	2010	–	–	–	44		Non-album single
"Rock n Roll" (Raekwon featuring Ghostface Killah, Jim Jones and Kobe)	2011	–	–	–	–		Shaolin vs. Wu-Tang
"New God Flow.1" (GOOD Music featuring Kanye West, Pusha T and Ghostface Killah)	2012	89	43	–	–		Cruel Summer
"Flow Is Trouble" (1200 Techniques featuring Ghostface Killah)	2015	–	–	–	–		Time Has Come
"Dat Stick" (Remix) (Rich Brian featuring Pouya and Ghostface Killah)	2016	–	4	–	–		Non-album single
"Gonna Love Me" (Remix) (Teyana Taylor featuring Ghostface Killah, Method Man and Raekwon)	2018	–	–	–	–		K.T.S.E.
"Happy" (Joy Denalane featuring Ghostface Killah)	2023	–	–	–	–		Alles Liebe

== Other guest appearances ==
List of non-single guest appearances, with other performing artists, showing year released and album name
Title	Year	Other artist(s)	Album
"Right Back at You"	1995	Mobb Deep, Raekwon, Big Noyd	The Infamous
"Eye for an Eye (Alternate Version)"	1995	Mobb Deep, Nas, Raekwon	The Infamous Mobb Deep
"Brooklyn Zoo II (Tiger Crane)"	1995	Ol' Dirty Bastard	Return to the 36 Chambers: The Dirty Version
"Knuckleheadz"	1995	Raekwon, U-God	Only Built 4 Cuban Linx...
"Rainy Dayz"	1995	Raekwon, Blueberry Raspberry	Only Built 4 Cuban Linx...
"Guillotine (Swordz)"	1995	Raekwon, Inspectah Deck, Genius/GZA	Only Built 4 Cuban Linx...
"Can It Be All So Simple (Remix)"	1995	Raekwon	Only Built 4 Cuban Linx...
"Ice Water"	1995	Raekwon, Cappadonna	Only Built 4 Cuban Linx...
"Glaciers of Ice"	1995	Raekwon, Masta Killa	Only Built 4 Cuban Linx...
"Verbal Intercourse"	1995	Raekwon, Nas	Only Built 4 Cuban Linx...
"Wisdom Body"	1995	—N/a	Only Built 4 Cuban Linx...
"Wu-Gambinos"	1995	Raekwon, Method Man, RZA, Masta Killa	Only Built 4 Cuban Linx...
"Investigative Reports"	1995	Genius/GZA, Raekwon, U-God	Liquid Swords
"Winter Warz"	1996	Cappadonna, Raekwon, Masta Killa, U-God	Don't Be a Menace to South Central While Drinking Your Juice in the Hood (soundtrack)/Ironman
"This Is for the Lover in You (Puffy Combs Remix)"	1996	Babyface	Non-album single
"Who's the Champion"	1996	RZA, Raekwon	The Great White Hype (soundtrack)
"Motherless Child"	1996	Raekwon	Sunset Park (soundtrack)/Ironman
"Real Live Shit" (Remix)	1996	Real Live, Cappadonna, Lord Tariq, Killa Sin	The Turnaround: A Long Awaited Drama
"Fast Life"	1996	Andre Rison	NFL Jams
"Freek'n You (Remix)"	1996	Jodeci, Raekwon	Non-album single
"'97 Mentality"	1998	Cappadonna	The Swarm
"Oh-Donna"	1998	Cappadonna	The Pillage
"Tha Game"	1998	Pete Rock, Prodigy, Raekwon	Soul Survivor
"Wu-Blood Kin"	1998	La the Darkman, 12 O'Clock	Heist of the Century
"Bobby Did It (Spanish Fly)"	1998	RZA, Islord, Jamie Sommers	Bobby Digital in Stereo
"Holocaust (Silkworm)"	1998	RZA, Dr. Doom, Holocaust	Bobby Digital in Stereo
"Run 4 Cover"	1999	Method Man & Redman, Street Life	Blackout!
"The Heist"	2000	Busta Rhymes, Roc Marciano, Raekwon	Anarchy
"No More (Cuban Linx 2000)"	2000	Ruff Endz	Love Crimes
"Cream 2001"	2001	DJ Clue, Raekwon	The Professional, Pt. 2
"Silent"	2002	GZA, Street Life	Legend of the Liquid Sword
"You (Remix)"	2002	Tekitha	Non-album song
"Saviorz Day"	2002	Sunz of Man, Madam D	Saviorz Day
"Summertime (Remix)"	2003	Beyoncé	—N/a
"Girls Callin'"	2003	Elephant Man	Def Jamaica
"Your Child" (Remix)	2003	Mary J. Blige	—N/a
"Fast Cars"	2003	RZA, Erica Bryant	Birth of a Prince
"Missing Watch"	2003	Raekwon, Polite	The Lex Diamond Story
"Clientele Kidd"	2003	Raekwon, Fat Joe, Polite	The Lex Diamond Story
"Thank U (Da DJ's Version)"	2003	Mathematics	Love, Hell or Right
"Face Off"	2004	DJ Kay Slay, Scarface	The Streetsweeper, Vol. 2
"I Gotta Get Paid"	2004	Lil Flip, Raekwon	Blade: Trinity (Soundtrack)
"Tony/Montana"	2004	Cormega	Legal Hustle
"I Love Them" (Remix)	2004	Eamon	—N/a
"Me, Myself and I" (Grizzley Remix)	2004	Beyoncé	—N/a
"D.T.D."	2004	Masta Killa, Raekwon	No Said Date
"Live from the PJs"	2004	The X-Ecutioners, Black Thought, Trife da God	Revolutions
"Real Niggaz"	2004	Planet Asia	The Grand Opening
"He Comes"	2004	De La Soul	The Grind Date
"Afterparty"	2004	Method Man	Tical 0: The Prequel
"New York"	2005	AZ, Raekwon	A.W.O.L.
"Movie Niggas"	2005	Sheek Louch	After Taxes
"Again (Ghostface Killah Remix)"	2005	Faith Evans	Mesmerized
"Made of Glass and Stone"	2005	Ricci Rucker, Trife da God	Ghost the Amazing
"Spraypaint & Inkpens"	2005	Fort Minor, Lupe Fiasco	DJ Green Lantern Presents Fort Minor: We Major
"Milk Em"	2005	Trife, Tara Ellis	2k6
"Hide Ya Face"	2005	Prefuse 73, El-P	Surrounded by Silence
"The Mask"	2005	Danger Doom	The Mouse and the Mask
"Strawberries & Cream"	2005	Mathematics, RZA, Inspectah Deck	The Problem
"Real Nillaz"	2005	Mathematics, Raekwon, Buddah	The Problem
"U.S.A."	2005	Mathematics, Buddah, Hot Flames, Masta Killa, P.I., Todd	The Problem
"Then Death Comes"	2005	Yor123, Skandaali, Solomon Childs	Round the World
"Weight"	2006	Swollen Members, The Alchemist	Black Magic
"Josephine"	2006	Hi-Tek, The Willie Cottrell Band	Hi-Teknology²: The Chip / More Fish
"Get Down Like That (Remix)"	2006	Ne-Yo	In My Own Words
"It's What It Is"	2006	Masta Killa, Raekwon	Made in Brooklyn
"Been Through"	2006	M-1, Raye	Confidential
"Clap for That"	2006	Noel Gourdin	Save the Last Dance (OST)
"Crambodia"	2006	Plastic Little	She's Mature
"2K007"	2006	Dan the Automator, A.G.	2K7
"Irreplaceable (Remix)"	2007	Beyoncé	Irreplaceable
"My Piano"	2007	Hi-Tek, Raekwon, Dion	Hi-Teknology 3
"Eldarado"	2007	Raekwon	The Vatican Mixtape Vol. 1
"ABC"	2007	Raekwon	The Vatican Mixtape Vol. 3
"The Young Black"	2007	Raekwon	The Vatican Mixtape Vol. 3
"Game"	2007	Napoleon	Kingpin with da Inkpen
"I'll Be Lovin' U Long Time" (Remix)	2007	Mariah Carey, LL Cool J	—N/a
"Star of the State"	2007	Styles P	Super Gangster (Extraordinary Gentleman)
"Shake It for Me"	2007	Beanie Sigel	The Solution
"Sniper Elite"	2008	MF Doom, J Dilla	Sniperlite
"Thorough"	2008	Solomon Childs	The Wake
"Gorilla Hood"	2008	Solomon Childs	The Wake
"Cartel Gathering"	2009	Jadakiss, Raekwon	The Last Kiss
"The Mayor"	2009	N.A.S.A., The Cool Kids, DJ AM, Scarface	The Spirit of Apollo
"Whar"	2009	RZA, Kool G Rap, Tash Mahogany	The RZA Presents: Afro Samurai Resurrection OST
"Harbor Masters"	2009	Inspectah Deck, AZ	Wu-Tang Chamber Music
"Evil Deeds"	2009	RZA, Havoc	Wu-Tang Chamber Music
"I Wish You Were Here"	2009	Tre Williams	Wu-Tang Chamber Music
"Chinatown Wars"	2009	Doom	GTA: Chinatown Wars
"Angelz"	2009	Doom	Born Like This
"Cold Outside"	2009	Raekwon, Suga Bang Bang	Only Built 4 Cuban Linx... Pt. II
"Gihad"	2009	Raekwon	Only Built 4 Cuban Linx... Pt. II
"Penitentiary"	2009	Raekwon	Only Built 4 Cuban Linx... Pt. II
"10 Bricks"	2009	Raekwon, Cappadonna	Only Built 4 Cuban Linx... Pt. II
"Mean Streets"	2009	Raekwon, Inspectah Deck, Blue Raspberry	Only Built 4 Cuban Linx... Pt. II
"The Badlands"	2009	Raekwon	Only Built 4 Cuban Linx... Pt. II
"Word Up"	2009	MSTRKRFT	Fist of God
"Four Minutes to Lock Down"	2009	Method Man, Redman, Raekwon	Blackout! 2
"El Nur"	2009	Riham, Saz, Tomer Yosef	Exotic on the Speaker
"Train Trussle"	2009	U-God, Scotty Wotty	Dopium
"Respectfully"	2009	Trife Diesel, Wigs	Better Late Than Never
"Live Nigga Night Out"	2009	Trife Diesel, Wigs	Better Late Than Never
"It Kills Me (Remix)"	2010	Melanie Fiona	—N/a
"Worldwide"	2010	Soulkast	Honoris Causa
"Smooth Sailing"	2010	Solomon	Pollen: The Swarm
"Penny Hardaway"	2011	The Cool Kids	When Fish Ride Bicycles
"Silver Rings"	2011	Raekwon	Shaolin vs. Wu-Tang
"Molasses"	2011	Raekwon, Rick Ross	Shaolin vs. Wu-Tang
"Laced Cheeba"	2011	Sean Price, Trife da God	Legendary Weapons
"The Black Diamonds"	2011	Roc Marciano, Killa Sin	Legendary Weapons
"Legendary Weapons"	2011	AZ, M.O.P.	Legendary Weapons
"Meteor Hammer"	2011	Action Bronson, Termanology	Legendary Weapons
"It May Be Glamour Life"	2012	Childish Gambino	Royalty
"Black Out"	2012	M.O.P., Pharoahe Monch	The Man With The Iron Fists (soundtrack)
"I Go Hard"	2012	Wiz Khalifa, Boy Jones	The Man With The Iron Fists (soundtrack)
"The Cypher"	2012	Snowgoons, Aspects, Killah Priest	Snowgoons Dynasty
"Space Cadet"	2012	Flume	Flume
"Savagely Attack"	2013	Czarface	Czarface
"Devotion to the Saints"	2013	Killah Priest, Inspectah Deck	The Psychic World of Walter Reed
"Smoking Blood – Drinking Fire"	2013	Shyheim	The Bottom of New York 3
"Unorthodox"	2013	Tony Touch, JD Era, Raekwon, RZA	The Piece Maker 3: Return of the 50 MCs
"4 Horsemen"	2013	Mathematics, Inspectah Deck, Method Man, Raekwon	The Answer
"Glorified Excellence"	2013	J-Love, Cormega	Not Designed to Quit
"What You Get Now"	2014	Aspects, Cody Coyote	Grind Over Matter
"90s Flow"	2014	DJ Kay Slay, Fat Joe, Raekwon, Sheek Louch, McGruff, N.O.R.E., Lil' Fame, Prodigy, Rell	Rhyme or Die
"4 in the Morning"	2015	Raekwon	Fly International Luxurious Art
"Revory (Wraith)"	2015	Raekwon, Rick Ross	Fly International Luxurious Art
"Dopebaron"	2015	King Keil, DJ Fastcut	Der Dope Baron
"I Luv It"	2015	Sheek Louch	Silverback Gorilla 2
"Same Damn Thing"	2016	Little Shalimar, Boldy James, eXquire	Rubble Kings Soundtrack
"Press Rewind"	2016	Bigstat	Heart of a Lion
"Bottle Service"	2016	Izm White	Wildlife
"Love and War"	2016	Banks & Steelz	Anything But Words
"Bills"	2016	Ivan Ooze	—N/a
"Killaz Supreme"	2016	Snowgoons, Aspects, Ill Bill, Sick Jacken	Goon Bap
"Herringbone"	2016	Vinnie Paz	The Cornerstone of the Corner Store
"Worldwide"	2016	Wax Tailor	By Any Beats Necessary
"This Is What It Comes Too (Remix)"	2017	Raekwon	—N/a
"Made for This"	2017	Wiki	No Mountains in Manhattan
"Disco Airlines"	2017	Killah Priest, 4th Disciple	Don't Sit on the Speakers Vol. 1
"Moon Crickets"	2017	Killah Priest, 4th Disciple	Don't Sit on the Speakers Vol. 1
"Emancipated"	2018	Dabrye	Three/Three
"Spaghetti Fettuccini"	2018	Shareef Keyes, The Groove	Cooking Something
"You (Remix)"	2018	Nicole Bus	I
"Decapitation Chamber"	2018	Lazarus	—N/a
"Beat Take 1"	2018	The Neighbourhood	Hard to Imagine the Neighbourhood Ever Changing
"The Best Intro Money Can Buy"	2018	Vanderslice	The Album Money Can Buy
"Padded Locks"	2018	Mick Jenkins	Pieces of a Man
"Lock Your Doors"	2019	Hue Hef, Harley	Thriller (soundtrack)
"Fighting for Equality"	2019	RZA	Cut Throat City (soundtrack)
"Feds"	2019	Harley, Hue Hef	Cut Throat City (soundtrack)
"D.R.E.A.M."	2019	Miley Cyrus	She Is Coming
"On That Shit Again"	2019	RZA	Of Mics and Men (soundtrack)
"Seen a Lot of Things"	2019	Raekwon, Harley	Of Mics and Men (soundtrack)
"Rain on Snow"	2019	DJ Shadow, Raekwon, Inspectah Deck	Our Pathetic Age
"Dragon Fire"	2020	R.A. the Rugged Man, Kool G Rap, Masta Killa, XX3EME	All My Heroes Are Dead
"The Mecca"	2020	Styles P, Nas, Remy Ma, Dave East	The Forty-Year-Old Version
"Light Up"	2020	Vivian Greene	Love Absolute
"I Ain't Even Done"	2020	Omarion	The Kinection
"Growing Up in These Streets"	2020	DJ Kayslay, Raekwon, AZ	Living Legend
"'90s Flow"	2021	DJ Kayslay, Raekwon, Sheek Louch, Fat Joe	The Soul Controller
"Rainbows"	2021	Lion Babe	Rainbow Child
"The World & Everything in It"	2021	Izzy Strange	Ugly Loves Company
"Extravagant"	2021	Dj Kayslay, Raekwon, Tragedy Khadafi, Sheek Louch	Accolades
"Medallion"	2021	Jenevieve	Division
"Wallabees and Gucci Loafers"	2021	DJ Muggs, Flee Lord, Roc Marciano	Rammellzee
"Bob James Freestyle/I Got Soul Freestyle"	2021	Raekwon	—N/a
"Distance"	2021	Russ, Conway the Machine	Chomp 2
"We Ain't Come to Lose"	2022	Raekwon	Teenage Mutant Ninja Turtles: Shredder's Revenge
"Purple Hearts"	2022	Kendrick Lamar, Summer Walker	Mr. Morale & the Big Steppers
"Throwback Boogie"	2022	Maro Music, Raekwon	Rejects
"Super Soldier"	2022	State of the Nation, Killah Priest	—N/a
"Hibiscus"	2022	Sheek Louch	Beast Mode 5
"Don't Ever Disrespect Me"	2022	Nems, Scram Jones	—N/a
"Science Class"	2022	Westside Gunn, Raekwon, Busta Rhymes	10
"Piece of Me (Remix)"	2023	Lady Wray	—N/a
"Unpredictable"	2023	Statik Selektah, Inspectah Deck, Method Man, Raekwon	Round Trip
"Modern Day Miracle"	2023	Remedy	—N/a
"World Famous"	2023	I Born	—N/a
"Good Good Good"	2023	Dave East	Fortune Favors the Bold
"Sicilian Gold"	2023	DJ Muggs, Westside Gunn	Soul Assassins 3
"Swarm Tactics"	2023	PrettyP	—N/a
"Lyte Ghost Lil Mama"	2024	MC Lyte	1 of 1
"The Source"	2024	Berner, Raekwon, Killer Mike	HOFFA
"Survive the Night"	2024	Shenseea, Chris Rivers, Nas, RZA, Cam'ron, Busta Rhymes	Warriors
"GFK Interlude"	2025	Black Soprano Family	The Outcome
"Ginnungagap"	2025	Galstarr	Halbdeutscher Waldläufer
"Amityville (Remix)"	2025	CHG, Myalansky Wu-Syndicate	Unfadable Wu-Tang Syndicate
"600 School"	2025	Raekwon, Method Man	The Emperor's New Clothes
"Get Outta Here"	2025	Raekwon	The Emperor's New Clothes
"Mac & Lobster"	2025	Raekwon	The Emperor's New Clothes
"Clear Black Nights"	2025	Mobb Deep, Raekwon	Infinite
“Rock Ya Body”	2026	Rakim, Kurupt, Masta Killa, Raekwon	The Godbody LP
“Gangland”	2026	Talha Anjum, JJ47, Talhah Yunus	Designerr

== Music videos ==
List of music videos, with directors, showing year released
Title	Year	Director(s)
"Heaven & Hell" (with Raekwon)	1994	Ralph McDaniels
"Ice Cream" (with Raekwon featuring Cappadonna and Method Man)	1995	Ralph McDaniels
"Criminology" (with Raekwon)	1995	Froi Cuenta & Guy Guillet
"Glaciers of Ice" (with Raekwon featuring Masta Killa)	1995	Froi Cuenta
"Daytona 500" (with Raekwon featuring The Force M.D.s and Cappadonna)	1996	RZA
"All That I Got Is You" (featuring Mary J. Blige)	1996	Terry Heller, Chuck Ozeas
"Motherless Child" (with Raekwon)	1996	GZA
"Camay" (with Raekwon and Cappadonna)	1996	GZA
"Cobra Clutch"	1998	`
"Mighty Healthy"	1999	`
"Apollo Kids" (featuring Raekwon)	2000	Chris Robinson
"Cherchez La Ghost" (featuring U-God and Madam Majestic)	2000	Little X
"Never Be the Same Again" (featuring Carl Thomas and Raekwon)	2001	Nick Quested, Ghostface Killah, Raekwon
"Run" (featuring Jadakiss)	2004	Rick Mordecon
"Tush" (featuring Missy Elliott)	2004	Erik White
"Back Like That" (featuring Ne-Yo)	2006	Ray Kay
"Tony Sigel A.K.A. the Barrel Brothers" (featuring Beanie Sigel and Styles P)	2007	`
"We Celebrate" (featuring Kid Capri)	2008	Juwan Lee
"Baby" (featuring Raheem DeVaughn)	2009	`
"Stapleton Sex"	2009	`
"2Getha Baby"	2011	Phil
"Rise of the Ghostface Killah"	2013	Adrian Younge
"Love Don't Live Here No More" (featuring Kandace Springs)	2014	Dan "The Man" Melamid
"Conditioning"	2019	`
"Party Over Here"	2019	`
"Scar Tissue" (featuring Nas)	2024	`
"Pair of Hammers" (featuring Method Man)	2024	`

== Features ==
Year	Artist	Album	Song
1995	GZA`	Liquid Swords	4th Chamber
1996	Real Live	The Turnaround	Real Live Shit (Remix)
1998	Bobby Digital	Bobby Digital in Stereo	Holocaust (Silkworm)
1999	Charli Baltimore	Cold As Ice	Stand Up
2001	Cappadonna	The Yin and the Yang	Super Model
2002	G. Dep	-	Special Delivery (Remix)
2002	Tekitha	-	You (Remix)
2003	Supa Saian Crew	The World According to RZA	Saian
2003	Mark Ronson	Here Comes the Fuzz	Ooh Wee
2004	Eamon	-	I Love Them Hoes
2009	Raekwon	OBFCL2	New Wu
2015	1200 Techniques	Time Has Come	Flow Is Trouble
2016	Ivan Ooze	-	Bills
2016	Banks & Steelz	Anything But Words	Anything but Words
2016	Wax Taylor	By Any Beats Necessary	Worldwide
2016	Rich Brian	-	Dat Stick (Remix)
2018	Lazarus	-	Decapitation Chamber
2018	Teyana Taylor	-	Gonna Love Me (Remix)
2020	DJ Kay SLay	Living Legend	Growing Up in These Streets
2020	R.A. the Rugged Man	All My Heroes Are Dead	Dragon Fire
2020	DJ Kay Slay	Homage	It's About to Go Down
2021	DJ Kay Slay	Accolades	Extravagant
2021	Lion Babe	Rainbow Child	Rainbows
2023	Nems	-	Don't Ever Disrespect Me
