= Waist Deep (soundtrack) =

Soundtrack album to Waist Deep by Various Artists
- Released: June 13, 2006
- Recorded: 2005–06
- Genre: Hip hop; R&B
- Length: 58:28
- Label: Russell Simmons Music Group; Def Jam
- Producer: Russell Simmons (exec.); Leroy "Tony" Austin (also exec.); Sean "MOCCAA" Banks; Bink!; C.K.P.; Da Mascot; D'Mile; Dilemma; Hallway Productionz; Josef Leimberg; Jonathan "J.R." Rotem; Pete Rock; The Featherstones; Tone Jam Productions; Tony Isaac; Victor Taylor Holmes; Darnell "DJ Prosper" Conley

Singles from Waist Deep
- 1. "Be Easy" Released: October 25, 2005; 2. "Bad Girl" Released: May 2006

Professional ratings
Review scores
Source	Rating
AllMusic	3/5 stars
RapReviews	5/10

Music from and Inspired by the Motion Picture Waist Deep is the soundtrack to Vondie Curtis-Hall's 2006 film Waist Deep. It was released on June 13, 2006 via Russell Simmons Music Group.

== Track listing ==
No.	Title	Producer(s)	Length
1.	"Guttaville" (performed by Dro, Boe Skagz & Tay Nati)	Victor Taylor Holmes; Danny Saber; Darnell "DJ Prosper" Conley (co.)	4:02
2.	"Child Support" (performed by Ice Cube)	Teak "Tha Beatsmith" and Dee Underdue	4:03
3.	"This Ain't a Game" (performed by Lil Eazy-E & Bone Thugs-n-Harmony)	Jonathan "J.R." Rotem	4:11
4.	"Who Want It" (performed by Sam Scarfo & Buju Banton)	Bink!	4:20
5.	"Do Yah Bad" (performed by Yung Joc)	C.K.P.	4:10
6.	"Shit on Me" (performed by Dro)	Tony Isaac	4:00
7.	"Hey" (performed by Young S. Dub)	Leroy "Tony" Austin; Sean "MOCCAA" Banks	4:27
8.	"I Get Doe" (performed by D.O.G. & Jim Jones)	Sean "MOCCAA" Banks; Samir Singletary (co.)	4:39
9.	"Bad Girl" (performed by Black Buddafly & Fabolous)	Leroy "Tony" Austin; The Featherstones	3:52
10.	"Act Like That" (performed by Lee Carr)	Tone Jam Productions	3:50
11.	"I'm Bout a Dolla" (performed by Glasses Malone, Kanary Diamonds & Kam)	Dilemma	3:35
12.	"Problems" (performed by Curtains)	Dernst Emile II	3:16
13.	"Be Easy" (performed by Ghostface Killah & Trife Da God)	Pete Rock	3:19
14.	"Gilla House Check" (performed by Redman)	Da Mascot	3:01
15.	"Dolla Dolla Bill" (performed by Nate Dogg)	Josef Leimberg	3:43
Total length:			58:28

== Charts ==
Chart (2006)	Peak position
US Top R&B/Hip-Hop Albums (Billboard)	42
US Top Soundtracks (Billboard)	10
