= Milk Em' =

Single by Ghostface Killah & Trife da God

from the album Put It on the Line
- Released: May 3, 2005
- Recorded: 2005
- Genre: Hip hop
- Label: Sound in Color

Ghostface Killah singles chronology
"On My Knees" (2004)	"Milk Em'" (2005)	"Be Easy" (2005)

Trife Da God singles chronology
"Ooh Wee" (2003)	"Milk Em'" (2005)	"Be Easy" (2005)

"Milk Em" is the only single by Ghostface Killah and his protégé Trife da God off the collaborative album Put It on the Line.

== Song ==
Milk Em' was released as a single on independent record label Sound in Color. The single was released using five different producers each putting their own individual beat behind Ghost and Trife's rhymes.

== Track listings ==
=== A Side ===
1. Milk Em' (Benny Cassette Version)
2. Milk Em' (Benny Cassette Version Instrumental)
3. Milk Em' (Strange Fruit Project Version)
4. Milk Em' (Strange Fruit Project Version Instrumental)

=== B Side ===
1. Milk Em' (Exile Version)
2. Milk Em' (Exile Version Instrumental)
3. Milk Em' (MHE Version)
4. Milk Em' (Ricci Rucker Version)
