= Better Late Than Never (Trife Diesel album) =

Studio album by Trife Diesel
- Released: July 21, 2009
- Recorded: 2008–2009
- Genre: Hip-hop
- Length: 1:00:28
- Labels: T.D.L.; Diesel Music Group
- Producers: Animal House; Bean One; Blunt; DJ Flatline; DJ Snips; Kender; Lee Bannon; Lewis Parker; Mental Instruments; Neenyo; Noize Thievery; Quincy Tones

Trife Diesel chronology
Put It on the Line (2005)	Better Late Than Never (2009)

Professional ratings
Review scores
Source	Rating
HipHopDX	3/5
RapReviews	9/10
The Boston Phoenix	3/4 stars

Better Late Than Never is the debut solo studio album by Wu-Tang Clan affiliated American rapper and Theodore Unit member Trife Diesel. It was released on July 21, 2009, via T.D.L./Diesel Music Group. Production was handled by Blunt, DJ Snips, Animal House, Bean One, DJ Flatline, Kender, Lee Bannon, Lewis Parker, Mental Instruments, Neenyo, Noize Thievery and Quincy Tones. It features guest appearances from Kryme Life, Tommy Whispers, Ghostface Killah, Freeway, Mike Payne, Royce da 5'9", Shawn Wigs, Slash and Termanology.

== Track listing ==
No.	Title	Producer(s)	Length
1.	"Better Late Than Never"	Blunt	3:24
2.	"Wanna Be a Rapper"	Lee Bannon	2:11
3.	"We Get It In"	DJ Snips	3:55
4.	"Heads or Tails"	DJ Snips	3:21
5.	"Prey vs. Predator" (featuring Kryme Life and Tommy Whispers)	Bean One	4:19
6.	"Project Leaders" (featuring Freeway and Termanology)	Blunt	4:27
7.	"Respectfully" (featuring Ghostface Killah)	Neenyo	4:41
8.	"Listen Carefully" (featuring Tommy Whispers and Kryme Life)	Mental Instruments	2:55
9.	"Blind Man"	Blunt	3:36
10.	"Live Nigga Night Out" (featuring Ghostface Killah and Shawn Wigs)	Quincy Tones	2:16
11.	"Stronger Man" (featuring Kryme Life)	Animal House	4:45
12.	"Powerful Minds" (featuring Royce da 5'9")	DJ Flatline; Kender	4:04
13.	"The World Today"	Noize Thievery	3:54
14.	"Direct from the Ghetto" (featuring Tommy Whispers)	Blunt	3:47
15.	"What Did I Do Wrong" (featuring Slash)	Blunt	4:14
16.	"Mother Like You" (featuring Mike Payne)	Lewis Parker	4:39
Total length:			1:00:28

== Personnel ==
- Theodore "Trife Diesel" Bailey – vocals, executive producer
- Anthony "Kryme Life" Jones – vocals (tracks: 5, 8, 11)
- Louis "Tommy Whispers" Felicier – vocals (tracks: 5, 8, 14)
- Leslie "Freeway" Pridgen – vocals (track 6)
- Daniel "Termanology" Carrillo – vocals (track 6)
- Dennis "Ghostface Killah" Coles – vocals (tracks: 7, 10)
- Shawn "Wigs" Simons – vocals (track 10)
- Ryan "Royce da 5'9"" Montgomery – vocals (track 12)
- Slash – vocals (track 15)
- Mike Payne – vocals (track 16)
- Blunt – producer (tracks: 1, 6, 9, 14, 15)
- Fred "Lee Bannon" Warmsley III – producer (track 2)
- Todd "DJ Snips" Worsnip – producer (tracks: 3, 4)
- Cavin "Bean One" Stocker – producer (track 5)
- Sean "Neenyo" Seaton – producer (track 7)
- Mental Instruments – producer (track 8), executive producer
- Sean "Quincy Tones" McCaffrey – producer (track 10)
- Animal House – producer (track 11)
- DJ Flatline – producer (track 12)
- Kender – producer (track 12)
- Noize Thievery – producer (track 13)
- Lewis Parker – producer (track 16)
