= Back Like That =

Single by Ghostface Killah featuring Ne-Yo

from the album Fishscale
- Released: February 28, 2006
- Recorded: 2005
- Genre: Hip-hop
- Length: 3:52
- Label: Def Jam
- Songwriters: Shawn Carter; Dennis Coles; Douglas Gibbs; Willie Hutch; Ralph Johnson; Shaffer Smith
- Producer: Xtreme

Ghostface Killah singles chronology
| "Be Easy" (2005) | "Back Like That" (2006) | "We Celebrate" (2008) |

Ne-Yo singles chronology
| "So Sick" (2005) | "Back Like That" (2006) | "Feels So Good" (2006) |

Remix cover

Back Like That is the second single by the American rapper Ghostface Killah from his fifth solo album Fishscale (2006). It features R&B singer Ne-Yo, and peaked at number 61 on the Billboard Hot 100, becoming Ghostface Killah's highest entry on the chart until his 2022 song "Purple Hearts" (with Kendrick Lamar and Summer Walker). "Back Like That" contains a sample of "Baby Come Home" as performed by Willie Hutch, as well an interpolation of "Song Cry" as performed by Jay-Z. A remix featuring Kanye West and Ne-Yo was later released and included on his sixth album, More Fish. He performed the song with Chrisette Michele at VH1's 6th Annual Hip Hop Honors ceremony.

== Music video ==
The music video for "Back Like That" was directed by Ray Kay and Mike Caruso. The video illustrates the deterioration of the relationship between Ghostface and his girlfriend after she cheats on him with a man with whom he has beef. Over time, Tony regains his wounded pride and eventually kicks her out of their apartment. As the story draws to a close, the man she cheated on him with walks into a set-up where Tony's friends lie in wait. He promptly turns around to run away and they all give chase. The video then concludes with a "to be continued..."

== Remix ==
The official remix featuring Kanye West and Ne-Yo was produced and it was also included in Ghostface's fifth album Fishscale, it was later included on Ghostface's sixth album More Fish & his eighth album Ghostdini: Wizard of Poetry in Emerald City.

A second version of the remix has a new verse by Ne-Yo, different from his verse of the main remix, was included on Ghostface's compilation album GhostDeini the Great.

An all-female remix of the song made by DJ Cocoa Chanelle, Da Brat and Lil' Mo was featured in the Golden Globe-winning motion picture Precious (2009).

== Track listings ==
=== United States ===
A & B sides

1. Back Like That (Clean)
2. Back Like That (Dirty)
3. Back Like That (Instrumental)
4. Back Like That (Acapella)

=== Europe ===
1. Back Like That (Radio Edit)
2. Back Like That (Remix Radio Edit)
3. Back Like That (Album Version)
4. Back Like That (Remix Album Version)

=== Remix ===
A & B sides

1. Back Like That (Remix) (Radio)
2. Back Like That (Remix) (Dirty)
3. Back Like That (Remix) (Instrumental)

== Charts ==
=== Weekly charts ===
| Chart (2006) | Peak position |
|---|---|
| Ireland (IRMA) | 48 |
| Scotland Singles (OCC) | 54 |
| UK Singles (OCC) | 46 |
| UK Hip Hop/R&B (OCC) | 7 |
| US Billboard Hot 100 | 61 |
| US Hot R&B/Hip-Hop Songs (Billboard) | 14 |
| US Hot Rap Songs (Billboard) | 11 |

=== Year-end charts ===
| Chart (2006) | Position |
|---|---|
| US Hot R&B/Hip-Hop Songs (Billboard) | 65 |
