= Ooh Wee =

2003 single by Mark Ronson featuring Ghostface Killah, Nate Dogg, Trife and Saigon

Single by Mark Ronson featuring Ghostface Killah, Nate Dogg, Trife and Saigon

from the album Here Comes the Fuzz
- B-side: "NYC Rules"
- Released: 20 October 2003
- Recorded: 2002–2003
- Genre: Alternative hip hop; disco; funk
- Length: 3:29
- Label: Elektra
- Songwriters: Robert Hebb; Mark Ronson; Dennis Coles; Nathaniel Hale; Brian Carenard; Theo Bailey; Dennis Coffey
- Producer: Mark Ronson

Mark Ronson singles chronology
| "Ooh Wee" (2003) | "NYC Rules" (2004) |

Ghostface Killah singles chronology
| "Guerrilla Hood" (2003) | "Ooh Wee" (2003) | "Tush" (2004) |

Nate Dogg singles chronology
| "Gangsta Nation" (2003) | "Ooh Wee" (2003) | "The Set Up" (2004) |

Trife singles chronology
| "Guerrilla Hood" (2003) | "Ooh Wee" (2003) | "Milk Em'" (2005) |

Saigon singles chronology
| "Do You Know" (2002) | "Ooh Wee" (2003) | "Favorite Thing" (2004) |

"Ooh Wee" is the debut single by British DJ and record producer Mark Ronson featuring guest vocals by American hip hop artists Ghostface Killah, Nate Dogg, Trife and Saigon. It was released as the lead single from Ronson's debut studio album, Here Comes the Fuzz, on 20 October 2003. It charted at number 15 on the UK Singles Chart, and caused Ronson to return to the UK after many years of living in the United States.

== Background ==
"Ooh Wee" was released as Ronson's debut single, from his album Here Comes the Fuzz. It features Ghostface Killah, Nate Dogg, Trife and Saigon. The record was produced in New York, where Ronson was living at the time. The song samples "Scorpio" by Dennis Coffey and Boney M's version of "Sunny"; in an interview with Rolling Stone, Ronson stated that he decided to sample the song after hearing it in the film Boogie Nights, and listening to the end of the film through the credits after discovering that the record wasn't on the film's soundtrack.

On episode 2 of the Apple TV series Watch with Sound with Mark Ronson, on sampling, Ronson tells the story of how he owns "minus 25% of the song" because Boney M took 100% of the publishing because he sampled them, and then Dennis Coffey, whose drum break is sampled, demanded another 25%. He apparently didn't care that Boney M had already taken 100%.

The record was made only thinking of giving it to Ghostface Killah. Ronson's manager contacted Killah, who had previously been acquainted with each other. However, once Killah had added his part, he thought having an extra voice would complement the record, so he contacted the head of his label to see if he could get Nate Dogg on the record. After sending Dogg the record, it took him less than 24 hours to return it with his part recorded.

== Music video ==
A music video for the song was created and was directed by Rich Newey. It features all four rappers and Ronson miming to the original track. For it, Ronson had the back of his head shaved in such a manner that the words "Here Comes the Fuzz" appear on his head; a shot of this begins the video. During his 4Music #Hangout, he explained that the barber who cut his hair that day only spoke English and could not read or write it, and so to him he was in fact carving a picture in to the back of Ronson's head.

== Critical reception ==
Dorian Lynskey of The Guardian described the song as "fizzy disco-rap ... informed by the freewheeling, celebratory spirit of late 80s hip-hop".

Matt Collar of AllMusic noted "rappers Ghostface Killah and Nate Dogg take the mic over a funky cowbell and the string section of Dennis Coffey's "Scorpio" on "Ooh Wee."

== In popular culture ==
It was featured in the 2003 movie Honey and its soundtrack. The song was later used in the movies Hitch and Harold & Kumar Escape from Guantanamo Bay.

As of 2019, the song was featured in various Domino’s Pizza adverts in the UK.

It was featured in the official trailer for the 2019 movie Spies in Disguise.

In 2021, the song was used on a UK advert for McDonald's, and the following year it was used in an advert for Carolina Herrera New York: Bad Boy Cobalt.

In 2024, the song was featured in a commercial for Bleu de Chanel featuring actor Timothée Chalamet.

The song is heavily featured on ESPN as part of their 2024-2025 NBA coverage.

== Chart performance ==
"Ooh Wee" had a positive chart performance. The song charted at number 15 on the UK Singles Chart; this, coupled with Elektra Records' decision to drop Ronson, culminated in Ronson returning to London. The song also charted at number 82 on the MegaCharts, number 83 on the Australian Singles Chart number 95 on the German Singles Chart and in America number 32 on the Rhythmic Top 40 and number 80 on the Hot R&B/Hip-Hop Singles & Tracks.

== Charts ==
=== Weekly charts ===
| Chart (2003) | Peak position |
|---|---|
| Australia (ARIA) | 83 |
| Belgium (Ultratip Bubbling Under Flanders) | 6 |
| Belgium (Ultratip Bubbling Under Wallonia) | 16 |
| Germany (Official German Charts) | 95 |
| Netherlands (Single Top 100) | 82 |
| UK Hip Hop/R&B (Official Charts) | 7 |
| UK Singles (Official Charts) | 15 |
| US Hot R&B/Hip-Hop Songs (Billboard) | 80 |
| US Rhythmic Airplay (Billboard) | 32 |

=== Year-end charts ===
| Chart (2003) | Position |
|---|---|
| UK Urban (Music Week) | 38 |

== Certifications ==
| Region | Certification | Certified units/sales |
|---|---|---|
| United Kingdom (BPI) | Silver | 200,000^{‡} |
^{‡} Sales+streaming figures based on certification alone.
