= Trife =

Trife may refer to:

- Trife Da God, a rapper affiliated with the Wu-Tang Clan
- Triflic acid, a superacid
- Federal Electoral Tribunal (Tribunal Federal Electoral, or TRIFE), a precursor of Mexico's Electoral Tribunal of the Federal Judiciary
