= The Wallabee Champ =

Compilation album by Ghostface Killah
- Released: March 25, 2008
- Recorded: 1993–2007
- Genre: Hip hop
- Length: 55:00
- Label: Stark Enterprises/Full Clip Media

Ghostface Killah chronology
The Big Doe Rehab (2007)	The Wallabee Champ (2008)	GhostDeini the Great (2008)

The Wallabee Champ is an unofficial compilation album by American rapper and Wu-Tang Clan member Ghostface Killah. The album is a collection of b-sides and remixes.

== Track listing ==
#	Title	Time	Writer(s)	Producer(s)	Performer(s)	Sample(s)
1	"Intro"	0:57	D. Coles		Ghostface Killah	
2	"Wallabee Champ"	2:12	Dennis Coles	Just Blaze	Ghostface Killah	"Girls, Girls, Girls" by Jay-Z
3	"ABC"	1:43	Dennis Coles		Ghostface Killah	"ABC" by The Jackson Five
4	"Roosevelts"	3:04	D. Coles, C. Woods, & T. Bailey	DJ Muro	Ghostface Killah, Raekwon, & Trife Da God	
5	"Watch Your Mouth"	3:57	Wu-Tang Clan	DJ Scratch	Wu-Tang Clan	
6	"Tony Sigel"	3:31	Dennis Coles & D. Grant	LV & Sean C for The Hitmen	Ghostface Killah, Styles P, Beanie Sigel & Solomon Childs	
7	"Trials of Life"	3:00	D. Coles & A. Johnson	DJ Green Lantern	Ghostface Killah & Prodigy	
8	"Hidden Darts"	2:45	D. Coles	J-Love	Ghostface Killah	
9	"The Rich"	3:18	D. Coles		Ghostface Killah & Raekwon	
10	"We Dem Niggaz"	3:03	D. Coles		Ghostface Killah	
11	"Run (Remix)"	4:36	D. Coles, J. Phillips	RZA	Ghostface Killah, Jadakiss, & Lil Wayne	
12	"Good Times Pt. II"	3:52	D. Coles		Ghostface Killah, Lord Superb	
13	"Charlie Brown (Remix)"	2:30	D. Coles	Pete Rock	Ghostface Killah	
14	"Clips"	3:15	D. Coles		Ghostface Killah, Trife Da God	
15	"Clientele"	4:08	D. Coles, C. Woods, & J. Cartagena		Ghostface Killah, Raekwon,Fat Joe & Polite	
16	"Crockett & Tubbs"	1:30	D. Coles & C. Woods		Ghostface Killah & Raekwon	
17	"'93 Freestyle"	7:19	D. Coles & C. Smith		Ghostface Killah & Method Man	
