= D Prosper =

D. Prosper
- Also known as: Mastermind
- Born: Derick Prosper; Providence, Rhode Island, United States
- Origin: Providence, Rhode Island, United States
- Genres: Hip hop
- Occupations: A&R, rapper, songwriter
- Years active: 1995–present

D. (Derick) Prosper began his career as a poet on the NPS (National Slam Poetry) National Poetry Slam circuit. He won several regional competitions and featured on the 1994 Providence Poetry Slam Team. D. Prosper was the youngest poet featured on the tour. He ranked fourth in the nation at the NPS finals in Asheville, North Carolina. Prosper was also featured in respected publication Fast Folk Music Magazine. He eventually earned a coveted spot on the 1994 Lollapalooza Tour D. Prosper's love of spoken word poetry ignited his passion for hip-hop music.

== Music career ==
=== 1995–2013 ===
In 1995, he moved to New York City to pursue a career in the music industry. Performing at open mics at Nuyorican Poets Cafe in Manhattan's Lower East Side. Freestyling alongside such artists as Masta Ace, Mos Def, Da Bush Babees and Pharaohe Monch. D Prosper also performed poetry at the historical Nkiru Books in Brooklyn with Talib Kweli- and appeared on the now legendary The Stretch Armstrong & Bobbito Show on WKCR.

In 1996, D. Prosper released an EP under the name Mastermind. He wrote and produced the independent EP titled The Adventures of Mastermind for Brainchild/Griotchild Entertainment. It consisted of three tracks, Karma, Autobiography of a Bad MC and Ambulance Ride. There was a cassette version which included the additional tracks; Psalms for Pearl and a skit entitled M.A.S.T.E.R. The project was dedicated to Wayne 'DJ Pearl' Baptista.

In 1997, he released his second single Waited All My Life and B-side Hip-Hop Heads on Prosper's own imprint Brainchild/Griotchild Entertainment, distributed by Fatbeats

In 2010, after an hiatus from recording for over a decade; Derick wrote and performed lyrics to the closing sequence of an important educational documentary Cointelpro 101, designed at educating younger generations on Cointelpro.

In 2012 D. Prosper released his first ever mix tape #ATOM 12.12.12. via social media. It Featured collaborations with such producers and artists as Flying Lotus, DJ Khalil, Jay Electronica, Rashad 'Tumblin Dice' Smith, Shafiq Husayn and Sweet Honey in the Rock. #ATOM 12.12.12. received rave reviews and went viral with media support from Vice, Rap Genius, NME, AllHiphop.com, Okayplayer, The Source, RapRadar, Kevin Nottingham and more.

In 2013 D Prosper released a short film entitled 'Children of Atom' directed by Romulo Sans as a follow-up to the #ATOM 12.12.12 mix tape. The short film was released in conjunction with Vice. --- D Prosper's Music Video "Come On" directed by Dan the Man was also exclusively released thru "Vice" on their music channel Noisey.com

In 2013 D Prosper was selected as the Myspace #Artistoftheday for his thought provoking and politically charged #ATOM series.

DProsper continues to consult for major record labels as A&R. He recently signed Australian future soul band Hiatus Kaiyote to Flying buddha/Sony Masterworks with Salaam Remi. The band has appeared on tonight show with Jay Leno and are currently on tour with Erykah Badu and D'angelo.

== A&R Career ==
Derick began working at Columbia records under the president of A&R Gordon The Commissioner Williams. He met Multi-Platinum Grammy winning singer/actress Lauryn Hill while she was recording The Fugees LP The Score. This led to him assisting in the studio during the making of her solo album The Miseducation of Lauryn Hill which garnered ten Grammy nominations at the 41st Grammy Awards, winning five, making Hill the first female recording artist to receive both that number of nominations and awards in one night.

Derick progressed on to the position of A&R/Music consultant specializing in production coordination/ Music licensing/Brand Development, Tour bookings/TV and Film music supervision/Music publishing for such artists as 50 Cent, Dead Prez, Mos Def, Talib Kweli, Jay Electronica, Estelle, Damian Marley, Nas, Q-Tip, Ghostface Killah: Theodore Unit, Lloyd Banks, and Busta Rhymes, Amel Larrieux, Big K.R.I.T., Rakim and George Clinton. He has managed music producers such as Illmind, Black Jeruz, Chad Beats, Supa Dave West, Hi-tek, Jake One, Tha Biznes, securing multiple music placements on such major labels as Island Def Jam's Untitled (Nas), IGA's The Blue Carpet Treatment (Snoop Dogg) and Koch Records' Hi Teknology 3 (HiTek) 50 Cent Get Rich or Die Tryin (soundtrack).

=== Rawkus Records, 1998–2002: A&R Consultant ===
As A&R Consultant, Derick was responsible for hiring music producers and engineers for such notable projects as Black Star (Mos Def/Talib Kweli ), Soundbombing II and III and Talib Kweli and Hi Tek's Reflection Eternal. He produced X-ecutioners (Y'all know the name) featuring Xzibit, Pharoahe Monch and Inspectah Deck for the Lyricst Lounge and Ecko Unlimited Present:Underground Airplay. In 1999 he also produced the hit song Mister N****, by Mos Def featuring Q Tip (A Tribe Called Quest) on the album Black on Both Sides.

=== Interscope Records, 2004–2007: Senior director of A&R ===
He oversaw all elements of album production of 50 Cent and entire G-Unit artist roster, helping the company to sell over 20 million copies worldwide in three years. Responsibilities included song concept development, hiring of mix engineers and studio musicians, album mastering sequencing and delivery of master copies. Managing relationships with key music producers and music composers, background vocalists and studio musicians for all G-Unit projects. He liaised with label and music publishers to approve sample usage and sync licensing. Composed opening scene logo for MTV Films/Get Rich or Die Tryin'. Served as Music supervisor for Vivendi Universal computer game 50 Cent Bulletproof.

In addition to his work with G-Unit, Derick also served as LP production coordinator on the prestigious Tupac Shakur tribute albums Pac's Life and 2Pac Evolution..
