= Here Comes the Fuzz =

Studio album by Mark Ronson
- Released: 8 September 2003
- Studios: Axis Studios (New York, NY); Head First Media; Quad Recording Studios (Manhattan, NY)
- Genre: Hip-hop
- Length: 42:41
- Label: Elektra
- Producer: Mark Ronson

Mark Ronson chronology
Here Comes the Fuzz (2003)	Version (2007)

Singles from Here Comes the Fuzz
- 1. "Ooh Wee" Released: 20 October 2003; 2. "NYC Rules" Released: 16 February 2004

Here Comes the Fuzz is the debut studio album by British-American musician, disc jockey, and record producer Mark Ronson. It was released on 8 September 2003 via Elektra Records. Recording sessions took place at Axis Studios, Head First Media and Quad Recording Studios. Production was handled entirely by Ronson himself, with additional producer Justin Stanley, and Howard Benson serving as vocal producer. It features guest appearances from Anthony Hamilton, Aya, Daniel Merriweather, Debi Nova, Freeway, Ghostface Killah, M.O.P., Mos Def, Nappy Roots, Nate Dogg, Nikka Costa, Q-Tip, Rhymefest, Rivers Cuomo, Saigon, Sean Paul, Trife Diesel and Tweet, and contributions from Printz Board, Questlove, Billy Chang and Guyora Kats.

The album peaked at number 70 on the UK Albums Chart, number 99 on the Scottish Albums Chart and number 11 on the Official Hip Hop and R&B Albums Chart in the United Kingdom. In the United States, the album made it to number 84 on the Top R&B/Hip-Hop Albums chart. Ronson later addressed the failure of the album, often by joking that "only 12 people bought it". The album has sold 92,676 copies in the UK as of January 2015.

The album was supported with a single "Ooh Wee", which reached number 15 on the UK singles chart, number 7 on the Official Hip Hop and R&B Singles Chart, number 80 on the Hot R&B/Hip-Hop Songs, number 82 in the Netherlands and number 95 in Germany. The song was later used in 2003 film Honey, 2005 film Hitch, 2008 film Harold & Kumar Escape from Guantanamo Bay, 2016 TV mini-series City Beatz, and was performed at the Glastonbury Festival 2015.

The song "International Affair" was originally released on Sean Paul's 2002 album Dutty Rock, and featured vocals from Debi Nova instead of Tweet. The song "NYC Rules", featuring vocals from Daniel Merriweather and rapper Saigon, was released as the album's second single on 16 February 2004. The single was only released in Australia, and for its release, was re-titled "City Rules". It was promoted as Merriweather's first single in the country, and the cover art stated Ronson as the featured artist. The track peaked at number 76 on the ARIA Charts.

Unlike Ronson's later releases his debut album focuses more on the genre of hip-hop music with guest appearances from a number of famous rappers and hip-hop alumni. The album helped with commercial breakthrough of singers Rivers Cuomo and Daniel Merriweather. The popularity of the album grew following the release of the follow-up album Version in 2007, which saw Ronson collaborate with a number of well-known British and American artists on covers of well-known songs.

== Critical reception ==
Professional ratings
Review scores
Source	Rating
AllMusic	3/5 stars
Entertainment Weekly	C
The Guardian	4/5 stars
HipHopDX	3.5/5
Rolling Stone	3/5 stars

Here Comes the Fuzz was met with generally favorable reviews from music critics. Dorian Lynskey of The Guardian praised the album, stating: "the whole caboodle is informed by the freewheeling, celebratory spirit of late 80s hip-hop, and adds up to one of 2003's most irresistible party records". Jessica Koslow of HipHopDX declared: "Ronson gives us a handful of hot songs and crazy cool collaborations. He definitely has a buzz and well, here comes the fuzz (whatever that means)".

In mixed reviews, AllMusic's Matt Collar found the album "does ... resonate with the pulse of youthful ego driven by libido and hot wax". Matt Diehl of Rolling Stone wrote: "Ronson's first album as an artist, Here Comes the Fuzz, may stop the ill will: with guests such as Sean Paul, Q-Tip and Ghostface Killah alongside rock guys such as Rivers Cuomo and Jack White of the White Stripes, Ronson serves up a grab bag of pumping beats - and plays almost all of the instruments on the album". Neil Drumming of Entertainment Weekly resumed: "the collection's overall disco-licious come-together vibe is cloying and insubstantial. Better make it a Blockbuster night".

== Track listing ==
No.	Title	Writer(s)	Producer(s)	Length
1.	"Intro"	Mark Ronson	Mark Ronson	1:26
2.	"Bluegrass Stain'd" (featuring Nappy Roots and Anthony Hamilton)	Ronson; Brian Scott; James Chambers; Vito Tisdale; William Hughes; Anthony C. Hamilton; Guyora Kats	Mark Ronson	4:12
3.	"Ooh Wee" (featuring Ghostface Killah, Nate Dogg and Trife Diesel)	Ronson; Dennis Coles; Nathaniel Hale; Theodore Bailey; Robert Von Hebb; Dennis Coffey	Mark Ronson	3:30
4.	"High" (featuring Aya)	Ronson; Lysa Aya Trenier; William Chang; Gawdat Saleh	Mark Ronson	4:06
5.	"I Suck" (featuring Rivers Cuomo)	Ronson; Rivers Cuomo; Claudius Afolabi Siffre	Mark Ronson; Howard Benson (voc.)	2:55
6.	"International Affair" (featuring Sean Paul and Tweet)	Ronson; Sean Paul Henriques; Deborah Nowalski Kader; Eric Barrier; William Griffin; Althea Forrest; Donna Reid; Errol Thompson	Mark Ronson	3:25
7.	"Diduntdidunt" (featuring Saigon)	Ronson; Brian Carenard	Mark Ronson	3:59
8.	"On the Run" (featuring Mos Def and M.O.P.)	Ronson; Dante Smith; Eric Murray; Jamal Grinnage; Lenny Kravitz; Saul Hudson	Mark Ronson	2:37
9.	"Here Comes the Fuzz" (featuring Freeway and Nikka Costa)	Ronson; Leslie Pridgen; Domenica Costa	Mark Ronson; Justin Stanley (add.)	3:10
10.	"Bout to Get Ugly" (featuring Rhymefest and Anthony Hamilton)	Ronson; Che Smith; Hamilton; Hazar	Mark Ronson	3:33
11.	"She's Got Me" (featuring Daniel Merriweather)	Ronson; Daniel Merriweather; Rashad Smith; Alan Gorrie; Hamish Stuart; Malcolm Duncan; Owen McIntyre; Roger Ball; Steve Ferrone	Mark Ronson	3:49
12.	"Tomorrow" (featuring Q-Tip and Debi Nova)	Ronson; Jonathan Davis; Kader	Mark Ronson	3:56
13.	"Rashi" (Outro)	Ronson	Mark Ronson	2:03
Total length:				42:41

Japanese bonus track
No.	Title	Writer(s)	Length
14.	"NYC Rules" (featuring Daniel Merriweather and Saigon)	Ronson; Merriweather; Carenard	3:49

Sample credits

- Track 3 contains a sample of "Sunny" and a sample of "Scorpio".
- Track 5 embodies portions of "Too Late".
- Track 6 contains a sample of "I Know You Got Soul" and embodies portions of "Uptown Top Ranking".
- Track 8 contains a sample of "Always on the Run".
- Track 11 contains samples from "When Will You Be Mine" by the Average White Band.
- Track 12 contains a sample of Fania All-Stars' "Corimayere".

== Personnel ==
- Mark Ronson – vocals (tracks: 1, 13), guitars (track 1, 2, 5, 9–13), scratches (tracks: 1, 6), bass (tracks: 2, 9–11), percussion (tracks: 3–5, 9), keyboards (tracks: 4–6, 11), Wurlitzer electric piano (track 7), horn arrangements (track 11), Rhodes electric piano (track 13), producer, executive producer
- Guyora Kats – Wurlitzer electric piano (track 2), Rhodes electric piano & Juno 10 synthesizer (track 13)
- Ahmir-Khalib "Questlove" Thompson – drums (tracks: 2, 11), percussion (track 4)
- Billy Chang – guitar & bass (track 4)
- Larry Gold – conductor & string and horn arrangements (track 4)
- Daniel Merriweather – guitar (track 11)
- Printz Board – horn arrangements & trumpet (tracks: 11, 12)
- Timothy Orindgreff – saxophone (track 11)
- Deborah "Debi Nova" Kader – additional vocals (track 6), vocal arrangements & keyboards (track 12)
- Howard Benson – vocal producer (track 5)
- Justin Stanley – additional producer (track 9)
- Vaughan Merrick – recording
- Fab Dupont – mixing (track 1)
- Serban Ghenea – mixing (tracks: 2–13)
- Tim Roberts – mixing assistant (track 1)
- John Hanes – additional Pro Tools editing (track 1)
- Greg Gigendad Burke – design
- Roxanne Lowit – photography
- Dominique Trenier – executive producer
- Josh Deutsch – A&R
- Sylvia Rhone – A&R

== Charts ==
Chart (2003–2007)	Peak position
Scottish Albums (Official Charts)	99
UK Albums (Official Charts)	70
UK R&B Albums (Official Charts)	11
US Top R&B/Hip-Hop Albums (Billboard)	84
