= 36 Seasons =

Studio album by Ghostface Killah
- Released: December 9, 2014
- Recorded: 2014
- Genre: Hip-hop
- Length: 40:15
- Label: Tommy Boy
- Producers: The Revelations; Fizzy Womack; Malik Abdul-Rahmaan; The 45 King

Ghostface Killah chronology
Twelve Reasons to Die (2013)	36 Seasons (2014)	Sour Soul (2015)

Wu-Tang Clan solo chronology
Hook Off (2014)	36 Seasons (2014)	Fly International Luxurious Art (2015)

36 Seasons is the tenth studio album by American rapper and Wu-Tang Clan member, Ghostface Killah. It was released on December 9, 2014, by Tommy Boy Records.

== Background ==
In a December 2014, interview with HipHopDX, Ghostface Killah said it took about 11 days to record the album. Like Ghostface Killah's previous album, Twelve Reasons to Die, 36 Seasons is a concept album. The album follows the story of Tony Starks as he returns to Staten Island after nine years away seeking a quiet life but he finds this will be difficult to accomplish.

== Release and promotion ==
Record store Get On Down was the only retailer to sell 36 Seasons in vinyl format. Get On Down also sold a CD bundle that featured the vinyl version, an instrumental CD, poster, graphic novel booklet, and a T-shirt.

== Critical reception ==
Professional ratings
Aggregate scores
Source	Rating
Metacritic	72/100
Review scores
Source	Rating
AllMusic	4/5 stars
The A.V. Club	C+
Billboard	4/5 stars
Consequence of Sound	B
Entertainment Weekly	A−
Exclaim!	8/10
Los Angeles Times	2.5/4 stars
The Observer	3/5 stars
Pitchfork	6.0/10
Spin	7/10

36 Seasons received generally positive reviews from music critics. At Metacritic, which assigns a normalized rating out of 100 to reviews from critics, the album received an average score of 72, which indicates "generally favorable reviews", based on 18 reviews. David Jeffries of AllMusic said, "Inspiration flows out of the man throughout the album, and this end-to-end concept is executed with little note-spinning or boring lyrics that just serve the story, and while Twelve Reasons took a big giallo risk and nailed it, this more expected, '70s-favored success still surprises with its vigorous sense of purpose." Homer Johnsen of HipHopDX stated, "36 Seasons may not be Ghostface’s greatest project, but it is another notable addition to his extensive body of work. Rapping alongside Kool G Rap and AZ for the bulk of the album is certainly a treat, and the two have their own moments of glory. Production, on the other hand, simply does not hold on to the lyrical dynamism present between Ghost, Pharoahe Monch, AZ and G." Michael Madden of Consequence of Sound said, "36 Seasons is the result of consummate artistic process and taste--a complete album both lyrically and musically."

Theon Weber of Spin said, "It's a small, controlled, uncommonly focused album, by an artist well into the kind of middle age that prizes refinement and brevity." Olivia Arezes of Exclaim! stated, "Ghost has always been considered a master of storytelling, and on 36 Seasons, he paints the usual sordid pictures in his songs, except this time he's cast an all-star team —Kool G Rap, AZ, Pharoahe Monch and others — as characters in an audio comic that's as action-packed as a kung-fu film." Matthew Fiander of PopMatters said, "His flow is solid on this album, and there’s no reason to suggest Ghostface is done, but if he is trying to recapture something, all we get here is sound and fury."

== Track listing ==
Credits adapted from the album's liner notes.

36 Seasons track listing
No.	Title	Writer(s)	Producer(s)	Length
1.	"The Battlefield" (featuring AZ, Kool G Rap & Tre Williams)	Dennis David Coles; Anthony Cruz; Nathaniel Thomas Wilson; Wes Mingus; Josh Werner; Gintas Janusonis	Fizzy Womack; The Revelations	3:46
2.	"Love Don't Live Here No More" (featuring Kandace Springs)	Coles; Angela Johnson; Malik Abdul-Rahmaan	Malik Abdul-Rahmaan; The Revelations	3:48
3.	"Here I Go Again" (featuring AZ & Rell)	Coles; Cruz; Gerrell Gaddis; Mingus; Werner; Janusonis	Fizzy Womack; The Revelations	3:28
4.	"Loyalty" (performed by Kool G Rap & Nems)	Wilson; Travis Doyle; Mingus; Werner; Janusonis	The Revelations	1:57
5.	"It's a Thin Line Between Love and Hate" (performed by The Revelations)	Jackie Members; Richard Poindexter; Robert Poindexter	The Revelations	3:59
6.	"The Dogs of War" (featuring Shawn Wigs & Kool G Rap)	Coles; Shawn Simons; Wilson; Mingus; Janusonis	The Revelations	3:48
7.	"Emergency Procedure" (featuring Pharoahe Monch)	Coles; Troy Donald Jamerson; Mingus; Werner; Janusonis	The Revelations	2:42
8.	"Double Cross" (featuring AZ)	Coles; Cruz; Mingus; Werner; Janusonis	The Revelations	2:20
9.	"Bamboo’s Lament" (performed by Kandace Springs)	Johnson; Abdul-Rahmaan	Malik Abdul-Rahmaan; The Revelations	1:57
10.	"Pieces to the Puzzle" (featuring AZ)	Coles; Cruz; Mingus; Werner; Janusonis	The Revelations	2:35
11.	"Homicide" (featuring Nems & Shawn Wigs)	Coles; Doyle; Simons; Abdul-Rahmaan; Mingus; Werner; Janusonis	Malik Abdul-Rahmaan; The Revelations	3:21
12.	"Blood in the Streets" (featuring AZ)	Coles; Cruz; Mark Howard James	The 45 King; The Revelations	2:03
13.	"Call My Name"	Coles; Cruz; Janusonis	The Revelations	2:11
14.	"I Love You for All Seasons" (performed by The Revelations)	Sheila Young	The Revelations	2:20
Total length:				40:15

Deluxe Edition bonus tracks
No.	Title	Producer(s)	Length
15.	"The Battlefield" (Instrumental)	Fizzy Womack; The Revelations	3:43
16.	"Love Don't Live Here No More" (Instrumental)	Malik Abdul-Rahmaan; The Revelations	3:29
17.	"Here I Go Again" (Instrumental)	Fizzy Womack; The Revelations	3:29
18.	"Loyalty" (Instrumental)	The Revelations	1:26
19.	"The Dogs of War" (Instrumental)	The Revelations	3:05
20.	"Emergency Procedure" (Instrumental)	The Revelations	2:47
21.	"Double Cross" (Instrumental)	The Revelations	2:21
22.	"Pieces to the Puzzle" (Instrumental)	The Revelations	2:34
23.	"Homicide" (Instrumental)	Malik Abdul-Rahmaan; The Revelations	3:21
24.	"Blood in the Streets" (Instrumental)	The 45 King; The Revelations	2:05
25.	"Call My Name" (Instrumental)	The Revelations	2:14
Total length:			71:00

== Charts ==
Chart (2014)	Peak position
US Billboard 200	94
US Top R&B/Hip-Hop Albums (Billboard)	10
US Indie Store Album Sales (Billboard)	13
