= Ghostface Killahs =

Studio album by Ghostface Killah
- Released: September 6, 2019
- Recorded: 2019
- Genre: Hip hop
- Length: 33:14
- Label: Now Generation
- Producers: Ghostface Killah (exec.); Remedy Ross (also exec.); Shawn Wigs (also exec.); Danny Caiazzo; Shroom; Toure

Ghostface Killah chronology
Czarface Meets Ghostface (2019)	Ghostface Killahs (2019)	Set the Tone (Guns & Roses) (2024)

Wu-Tang Clan solo chronology
Chamber No. 9 (2019)	Ghostface Killahs (2019)	Black Is Beautiful (2020)

Ghostface Killahs is the eleventh studio album by American rapper Ghostface Killah. The album was released on September 6, 2019, by Now Generation Music Corporation. The album features guest appearances from Method Man, Cappadonna, Inspectah Deck, Harley, Sun God, Shawn Wigs, Solomon Childs, Eamon and Masta Killa. Ghostface Killahs was mixed by Josh Gannet.

== Critical reception ==
Professional ratings
Aggregate scores
Source	Rating
Metacritic	71/100
Review scores
Source	Rating
AllMusic	3.5/5 stars
Christgau’s Consumer Guide	(3-star Honorable Mention)
HipHopDX	3.9/5
Mojo	4/5 stars
Pitchfork	6.2/10
RapReviews	7/10
Tom Hull	B+

Ghostface Killahs received generally positive reviews from critics. At Metacritic, which assigns a normalized rating out of 100 to reviews from critics, the album received an average score of 71, which indicates "generally favorable reviews", based on 4 reviews.

== Track listing ==
- All tracks are produced by Danny Caiazzo.

No.	Title	Writer(s)	Length
1.	"Killah Intro"	Dennis David Coles	0:23
2.	"Me Denny & Darryl" (featuring Method Man and Cappadonna)	Coles; Clifford Smith, Jr.; Darryl Hill	2:43
3.	"Burner to Burner" (featuring Inspectah Deck and Cappadonna)	Coles; Jason Richard Hunter; Hill	3:08
4.	"Flex" (featuring Harley)	Coles; Harold Motley	3:35
5.	"News Report (Skit)"	Shawn Simons	0:39
6.	"Conditioning"	Coles	1:54
7.	"Fly Everything" (featuring Sun God and Shawn Wigs)	Coles; Dennis Ames; Simons	2:15
8.	"Party over Here"	Coles	3:08
9.	"Pistol Smoke" (featuring Solomon Childs)	Coles; Walbert Ryan Dale	3:06
10.	"Revolution (Skit)"	Coles	0:36
11.	"New World" (featuring Eamon)	Coles; Eamon Doyle; Allen Richard Toussaint; Aaron Joseph Neville	3:28
12.	"Waffles & Ice Cream" (featuring Cappadonna)	Coles; Hill	2:25
13.	"The Chase" (featuring Sun God)	Coles; Ames	2:18
14.	"Soursop" (featuring Masta Killa, Harley and Solomon Childs)	Coles; Jamel Irief; Dale; Motley	3:35
Total length:			33:14

== Charts ==
Chart (2019)	Peak position
US Independent Albums (Billboard)	25
