= Put It on the Line =

Studio album by Ghostface Killah and Trife Da God
- Released: November 18, 2005
- Recorded: 2001, 2004-2005
- Venue: New York City
- Genre: Hip-hop
- Length: 59:07
- Label: Starks

Ghostface Killah chronology
718 (2004)	Put It on the Line (2005)	Fishscale (2006)

Trife Da God chronology
718 (2004)	Put It on the Line (2005)	Better Late Than Never (2009)

Singles from Put It on the Line
- 1. "Milk Em'" Released: 2005

Professional ratings
Review scores
Source	Rating
RapReviews	8.5/10

Put It on the Line is a collaborative studio album by American rappers Ghostface Killah and Trife Diesel. It was released on November 18, 2005 via Starks Enterprises as a double disc.

The album is composed of 18 songs recorded from 2004 to 2005, except for tracks 16 and 18, which were recorded in 2001. It features contributions from Tommy Whispers, Raekwon, Shawn Wigs, Kool G Rap, Kryme Life, Slick Rick and Sun God.

A companion DVD, composed of 22 tracks, was recorded live on October 9, 2005 in New York City and features performances from Cappadonna, GZA, Killah Priest, Masta Killa and Sun God.

According to Trife's Myspace profile, the album has sold over 100,000 copies independently.

In his album review for his Consumer Guide column, American critic Robert Christgau wrote: "Trife has Ghost's sharpness without his cry or eye, which leaves more than you might fear", highlighting songs "Cocaine Trafficking" and "The Watch".

== Track listing ==
CD
No.	Title	Length
1.	"Cocaine Trafficking" (performed by Ghostface Killah and Trife Da God)	3:01
2.	"Put It on the Line" (performed by Trife Da God)	2:58
3.	"Struggle" (performed by Ghostface Killah)	2:40
4.	"Hustle Hard" (performed by Trife Da God)	3:36
5.	"Event" (performed by Trife Da God)	3:19
6.	"Gangsta Shit" (performed by Trife Da God and Tommy Whispers)	4:16
7.	"Fire" (performed by Ghostface Killah and Trife Da God)	3:20
8.	"Project Soap Operas" (performed by Trife Da God, Kryme Life and Tommy Whispers)	4:34
9.	"War" (performed by Trife Da God)	3:25
10.	"Out Da Way" (performed by Ghostface Killah and Shawn Wigs)	2:33
11.	"Drugz" (performed by Trife Da God)	3:50
12.	"Milk Em'" (performed by Ghostface Killah and Trife Da God)	2:18
13.	"Late Night Arrival" (performed by Ghostface Killah, Trife Da God and Shawn Wigs)	2:19
14.	"Man Up" (performed by Ghostface Killah, Trife Da God and Sun God)	4:10
15.	"Game Time" (performed by Trife Da God and Tommy Whispers)	3:55
16.	"The Watch" (performed by Ghostface Killah and Raekwon)	3:05
17.	"Ghost & Giancana" (performed by Ghostface Killah and Kool G Rap)	2:25
18.	"The Sun" (performed by Ghostface Killah, Raekwon and Slick Rick)	3:23
Total length:		59:07

LP only bonus track
No.	Title	Length
19.	"Tony's Money" (performed by Ghostface Killah)

DVD
No.	Title	Length
19.	"Intro"
20.	"Criminology"
21.	"Saturday Night"
22.	"Interlude"
23.	"Ice Cream" (with Cappadonna)
24.	"Nutmeg"
25.	"Apollo Kids"
26.	"Child's Play"
27.	"Interlude"
28.	"Holla"
29.	"One Blood" (performed by Masta Killa)
30.	"Forth Chamber" (with Killah Priest)
31.	"Liquid Swords" (performed by GZA)
32.	"Shimmy Shimmy Ya - ODB R.I.P."
33.	"Run"
34.	"Interlude/Sun God Freestyle"
35.	"Be Easy"
36.	"Be This Way"
37.	"Girls to the Stage"
38.	"Mighty Healthy"
39.	"Stay True"
40.	"Outro"
