= GhostDeini the Great =

Compilation album by Ghostface Killah
- Released: December 16, 2008
- Recorded: 1995–2007
- Genre: Hip hop
- Length: 1:11:10
- Label: Def Jam
- Producers: MoSS; Just Blaze; LV & Sean C; G2J Band; RZA; Pete Rock; Mathematics; K-Def; Hassan; MF Doom; Anthony Acid; Fantom of the Beats; Xtreme; Carlos Bess; 'Acid' Caputo; Shorty 140 Productions

Ghostface Killah chronology
The Wallabee Champ (2008)	GhostDeini the Great (2008)	Ghostdini: Wizard of Poetry in Emerald City (2009)

GhostDeini The Great is a compilation album by American rapper Ghostface Killah. It was released on December 16, 2008. The album includes singles as well as new and remixed tracks like "Be Easy (Remix)" featuring Ice Cube and "Kilo (Remix)" featuring Raekwon and Malice. Some versions also contain a DVD.

== Track listing ==
#	Title	Time	Producer(s)	Featured artist(s)
1	Kilo (Remix)	6:03	MoSS	Raekwon & No Malice
2	The Champ (Remix)	5:31	Just Blaze	
3	Tony Sigel a.k.a. Barrel Bros.	3:31	LV & Sean C	Styles P & Beanie Sigel
4	Slept on Tony	2:31	G2J Band	
5	Run (Remix)	5:54	RZA	Raekwon, Jadakiss, Freeway, & Lil Wayne
6	Be Easy (Remix)	4:25	Pete Rock	Ice Cube
7	Mighty Healthy	3:14	Allah Mathematics	
8	It's Over	3:30	K-Def	
9	Apollo Kids	3:52	Hassan	Raekwon
10	9 Milli Bros.	4:17	MF Doom	Wu-Tang Clan
11	Walk Around	3:32	Anthony Acid	
12	Street Opera	3:31	Fantom of the Beats	Sun God
13	All I Got Is You	5:19	RZA	Mary J. Blige & Popa Wu
14	Back Like That (Remix)	4:02	Xtreme	Kanye West & Ne-Yo
15	Cherchez LaGhost	3:05	Carlos Bess	U-God
16	Ghostface X-mas	3:02	'Acid' Caputo & Shorty 140 Productions	
