= More Fish =

Studio album by Ghostface Killah
- Released: December 12, 2006
- Recorded: 2006
- Genre: Hip-hop
- Length: 58:26
- Labels: Starks; Def Jam
- Producers: Anthony Acid; Fantom of the Beat; Ghostface Killah; Hi-Tek; J-Love; K. Slack; Koolade; Lewis Parker; Madlib; MF Doom; Mark Ronson; Ronald Frost; Xtreme

Ghostface Killah chronology
| Fishscale (2006) | More Fish (2006) | The Big Doe Rehab (2007) |

Wu-Tang Clan solo chronology
| 4:21... The Day After (2006) | More Fish (2006) | The Big Doe Rehab (2007) |

More Fish is the sixth studio album by American rapper Ghostface Killah, released on December 12, 2006, through Starks Enterprises and the Def Jam label. The album's name derives from Ghostface's earlier 2006 release, Fishscale. The track "Good", featuring Ghostface's fellow Theodore Unit member Trife Da God and Mr. Maygreen, and produced by Koolade and Ronald Frost, was the first single. It contains one track, "Josephine," which was originally featured on Hi-Tek's Hi-Teknology 2: The Chip, but all other tracks are made of previously unreleased material.

The album features several appearances from the members of Theodore Unit (Cappadonna, Shawn Wigs, Trife Da God and Ghostface's teenage son, Sun God), as well as from Redman, Sheek Louch, Killa Sin, Kanye West and singers Amy Winehouse, Eamon, Ne-Yo and Mr. Maygreen. Production comes from K. Slack, Hi-Tek, J-Love, Koolade, Ronald Frost, Madlib, MF Doom, Mark Ronson, Lewis Parker, Xtreme, Fantom of the Beats, Anthony Acid, and Ghostface himself.

== Critical reception ==
Professional ratings
Aggregate scores
| Source | Rating |
|---|---|
| Metacritic | 77/100 |
Review scores
| Source | Rating |
| AllMusic | 3.5/5 stars |
| The A.V. Club | B+ |
| Entertainment Weekly | A− |
| Mojo | 4/5 stars |
| Pitchfork | 7.3/10 |
| PopMatters | 7/10 |
| Robert Christgau | A− |
| Rolling Stone | 3.5/5 stars |
| Stylus | B+ |
| XXL | 4/5 stars |

More Fish received generally positive reviews from music critics. At Metacritic, which assigns a normalized rating out of 100 to reviews from critics, the album received an average score of 77, which indicates "generally favorable reviews", based on 21 reviews. Andy Kellman of AllMusic said, "Loosely speaking, More Fish is to Fishscale what Theodore Unit's 718 was to The Pretty Toney Album, albeit with more focus on Ghostface. While the title of this disc seems synonymous with Have Some Leftovers, it's not at all stale, if not nearly as spectacular as its precursor." Nathan Rabin of The A.V. Club said, "More Fish's lively assortment of odds and ends contains a few Fishscale-worthy gems, like the continental sophistication of the Mark Ronson-produced "You Know I'm No Good" and the MF Doom-produced "Alex," where Ghostface spins a head-spinning narrative so complex and detailed that it takes several listens to just to process everything. Fishscale was named after a particularly expensive and pure form of cocaine. More Fish's sonic fix is of a lesser quality, but it still packs a potent punch." A. L. Friedman of PopMatters said, "Like any compilation, More Fish doesn’t make much of a statement, except maybe that Ghostface is prolific, and that similar collections may have been left on the cutting room floor from his earlier work. And that’s just frustrating. But all told, there’s enough to make this little Def Jam tax write-off worthy of a listen for anyone that liked Fishscale, not just Ghostface completists."

Ryan Dombal of Pitchfork Media said, "Tucked away beneath the label's fourth-quarter heavy-hitters, More Fish is, appropriately, a fraction of the event Fishscale was. And while new material from one of the most consistent rappers of all time is always welcome, the new album's stealth release doubles as an admission of Ghost's limited commercial potential. The redundant title alone-- here ya go, More Fish!-- goes lengths to lower expectations." Simon Vozick-Levinson of Entertainment Weekly said, "The Wu-Tang Clan’s most reliable warrior extends his string of triumphs with More Fish, the sequel to his March release, Fishscale. Six discs into his solo career, Ghostface Killah handily delivers everything that his fans expect: nostalgic soul samples, richly detailed scenes of street life, and an abundance of inventive wordplay (”A shark’s teeth ain’t sharp enough/I’m like Mount St. Helen when the god erupt”)." Amanda Diva of XXL said, "Sometimes leftovers can be just as good as the original meal. Such is the case with Ghostface’s latest offering, More Fish. At first glance, this follow-up to last year’s Fishscale seems like nothing more than a Theodore Unit compilation, as names like Trife Da God and Sun God (Ghost’s son), as well as Wu-Tang affiliates Cappadonna and Killa Sin, flood the guest list. Despite the extra weight, Ghost still manages to pull off a surprisingly focused project."

== Commercial performance ==
More Fish debuted at number 71 on the U.S. Billboard 200, selling about 36,000 copies in its first week.

== Track listing ==
| No. | Title | Writer(s) | Producer(s) | Length |
|---|---|---|---|---|
| 1. | "Ghost Is Back" | Dennis David Coles; Jason Elias; William Michael Griffin Jr. | Ghostface Killah; J-Love | 5:04 |
| 2. | "Miguel Sanchez" (featuring Trife da God and Sun God) | Coles; Theodore Bailey; Dennis Ames; Carlos Evans; Marlanna Evans; Maurice White; Wade Herbert Flemons; Donald Whitehead | Fantom of the Beat | 2:51 |
| 3. | "Guns N' Razors" (featuring Trife da God, Cappadonna and Killa Sin) | Coles; Bailey; Darryl Hill; Jeryl Grant; Daniel Dumile | MF Doom | 3:15 |
| 4. | "Outta Town Shit" | Coles; Lewis Parker; Alan Tew | Lewis Parker | 3:45 |
| 5. | "Good" (featuring Trife da God and Mr. Maygreen) | Coles; Bailey; Matko Sasek; Ronald Frost; Rasheem Pugh | Koolade; Ronald Frost | 3:41 |
| 6. | "Street Opera" (featuring Sun God) | Coles; Ames; C. Evans; M. Evans; William Harrison Withers Jr. | Fantom of the Beat | 3:53 |
| 7. | "Block Rock" | Lutz Rahn | Madlib | 2:33 |
| 8. | "Miss Info Celebrity Drama" (skit) | Lonnie Thomas | | 0:44 |
| 9. | "Pokerface" (featuring Shawn Wigs) | Coles; Shawn Simons; Keith Slack; Jimmy Layne Webb | K. Slack | 2:45 |
| 10. | "Greedy Bitches" (featuring Redman and Shawn Wigs) | Coles; Reginald Noble; Simons; Anthony Caputo | Anthony Acid | 3:38 |
| 11. | "Josephine" (featuring Trife da God and the Willie Cottrell Band) | Coles; Bailey; Tony Cottrell; Willie Cottrell | Hi-Tek | 4:09 |
| 12. | "Grew Up Hard" (with Trife da God featuring Solomon Childs) | Coles; Bailey; Caputo; Inez Foxx; Bonny Rice | Anthony Acid | 4:47 |
| 13. | "Blue Armor" (featuring Sheek Louch) | Coles; Sean Divine Jacobs; C. Evans; M. Evans; Randy Bishop | Fantom of the Beat | 3:08 |
| 14. | "You Know I'm No Good" (with Amy Winehouse) | Coles; Amy Jade Winehouse; Mark Daniel Ronson | Mark Ronson | 4:23 |
| 15. | "Alex (Stolen Script)" | Coles; Dumile | MF Doom | 2:48 |
| 16. | "Gotta Hold On" (with Shawn Wigs featuring Eamon) | Coles; Eamon Doyle; Caputo; Joseph Leslie Sample; Wilbur Jennings | Anthony Acid | 3:01 |
| 17. | "Back Like That" (Remix; featuring Kanye West and Ne-Yo) | Coles; Kanye West; Shaffer Smith; Vernon Brown; William McKinley Hutchison | Xtreme | 4:01 |
| Total length: | | | | 58:26 |

Sample credits

- "Ghost Is Back" contains a sample of "Juice (Know the Ledge)" by Eric B. & Rakim.
- "Miguel Sanchez" contains a sample of "Love is Life" by Earth, Wind & Fire.
- "Guns N' Razors" contains a sample of "Villains Theme" from Spider-Man.
- "Outta Town Shit" contains a sample of "Drama Backcloth" by Alan Tew.
- "Good" contains a sample of "Love Music" by Earth, Wind & Fire.
- "Street Opera" contains a sample of "Ain't No Sunshine" by Michael Jackson.
- "Block Rock" contains a sample of "Dronsz" by Novalis.
- "Miss Info Celebrity Drama" contains a sample of "On Top" by Lonnie Youngblood.
- "Pokerface" contains a sample of "Wichita Lineman" by Sunday's Child.
- "Greedy Bitches" contains a sample of "TB Sheets" by Van Morrison.
- "Grew Up Hard" contains a sample of "Crossing the Bridge" by Inez Foxx.
- "Blue Armor" contains a sample of "Innocent Hearts" by John Farnham.
- "Alex (Stolen Script)" contains a sample of "The Thief Who Came to Dinner" by Henry Mancini.
- "Gotta Hold On" contains a sample of "Hold On (I Think Our Love is Changing)" by The Crusaders.
- "Back Like That" (Remix) contains a sample of "Baby Come Home" by Willie Hutch.

== Personnel ==
Artists

- Ghostface Killah – primary artist (tracks 1–11, 13–15, 17)
- Trife da God – featured artist (tracks 2, 3, 5, 11), primary artist (track 12)
- Sun God – featured artist (tracks 1, 6)
- Cappadonna – featured artist (track 3)
- Killa Sin – featured artist (track 3)
- Mr. Maygreen – featured artist (track 5)
- Shawn Wigs – featured artist (tracks 9, 10)
- Redman – featured artist (track 10)
- The Willie Cottrell Band – featured artists (track 11)
- Solomon Childs – featured artist (track 12)
- Sheek Louch – featured artist (track 13)
- Eamon – featured artist (track 16)
- Kanye West – featured artist (track 17)
- Ne-Yo – featured artist (track 17)
- Billie Cottrell – vocals (track 11)
- Michelle Cohen – vocals (track 11)
- Willie Cottrell – vocals (track 11)
- Tristan Wilds – background artist (track 1)
- Mario "Big O" Caruso – background artist (track 4)
- Jamie Seth – background artist (track 13)
- Miss Info – skit (track 8)
- Eric Edwards – skit (track 8)
- Tracy Morgan – skit (track 10)

Technical personnel

- Tony Dawsey – mastering (all tracks)
- Jason Goldstein – mixing (track 1)
- Anthony "Acid" Caputo – mixing (tracks 2–4, 6–13, 15–17), recording (tracks 1–13, 15–17)
- Jason Goldstein – mixing (track 5)
- Chach – mixing (track 11)
- Hi-Tek – mixing, recording (track 11)
- Tom Elmhirst – mixing (track 14)
- Nikos Teneketzis – mixing (track 17)
- Lucas McClellan – co-mixing (tracks 2–4, 6–16)
- Christian Baker – mixing assistant (tracks 1–13, 15, 16)
- Matt Paul – mixing assistant (track 14)
- Vaughan Merrick – recording (track 14)
- Michael Tocci – recording (track 17)
- Jesse Gladston – engineer assistant (track 14)
- Mike Makowski – engineer assistant (track 14)

Record producers

- Ghostface Killah – production (track 1)
- J-Love – production (track 1)
- Fantom of the Beat – production (track 2, 6, 12)
- MF Doom – production (tracks 3, 15)
- Lewis Parker – production (track 4)
- Koolade – production (track 5)
- Ronald "P-Nut" Frost – production (track 5)
- Madlib – production (track 7)
- K. Slack – production (track 9)
- Anthony Acid – production (track 10, 12, 16)
- Hi-Tek – production (track 11)
- Mark Ronson – production (track 14)
- Xtreme – production (track 17)
- DJ Finesse – scratches (track 1)
- Big D – drums (track 11)
- Homer Steinweiss – drums (track 14)
- Eric "E Dub" Isaacs – additional drums (track 11)
- Larry Cottrell – guitar (track 11)
- Binky Griptite – guitar (track 14)
- Thomas Bernneck – guitar (track 14)
- Nick Movshon – bass guitar (track 14)
- Victor Axelrod – piano (track 14)
- Carolyn "momdukes" Isaacs – keyboards (track 11)
- Ian Hendrickson-Smith – baritone saxophone (track 14)
- Neal Sugarman – tenor saxophone (track 14)
- Dave Guy – trumpet (track 14)

Additional personnel

- Dennis Coles – executive producer, A&R (direction), art direction
- Mike Caruso – executive producer, A&R (direction), management
- Shawn Carter – executive producer
- Scutch Robinson – co-executive producer
- Javon Greene – A&R (administration)
- Terese Joseph – A&R (administration)
- Jonathan Kaslow – A&R (for Starks Enterprises)
- Patrick "Plain Pat" Reynolds – A&R (for Starks Enterprises)
- Lenny Santiago – A&R (Island Def Jam)
- Leesa D. Brunson – A&R (operations)
- Dawud West – art direction
- Tai Linzie – photography and art coordination
- Grace Miguel – creative direction
- Scott Schafer – photography

== Charts ==
| Chart (2006) | Peak position |
|---|---|
| US Billboard 200 | 71 |
| US Top R&B/Hip-Hop Albums (Billboard) | 13 |
| US Top Rap Albums (Billboard) | 6 |
