= Tush (Ghostface Killah song) =

Single by Ghostface Killah featuring Missy Elliott

from the album The Pretty Toney Album
- B-side: "Run"
- Released: March 14, 2004
- Recorded: 2003
- Genre: Hip hop; dirty rap
- Length: 3:24
- Label: Def Jam
- Songwriters: Ghostface Killah; Robert Curington; Jeff Steinbacher; Derrick Trotman; Robert E. Lee
- Producers: D. Trotman; Dub Dot Z

Ghostface Killah singles chronology
| "Ooh Wee" (2003) | "Tush" (2004) | "On My Knees" (2004) |

Missy Elliott singles chronology
| "I'm Really Hot" (2004) | "Tush" (2004) | "Car Wash" (2004) |

Audio video
- "Tush" on YouTube

"Tush", censored as the alternate title "Push", is the first single by Ghostface Killah off the album The Pretty Toney Album and features vocals by Missy Elliott. The song samples "Naked Truth" by The Best of Both Worlds.

== Lyrical content ==
The song is explicitly about sex, and contains complex lyrics, word play, and fast tempo delivery. Both of which being a staple of the duo's previous solo outputs.

== Reviews ==
"Tush" was the subject of many mixed reviews. One reviewer felt the song helped Ghostface's push into the mainstream, while others felt the clean, over-production was at odds with Ghost's irrepressible street credibility. Starpulse however felt the song showed both Missy and Ghost in top form and called the wordplay clever.

== Track listing ==
1. "Tush"
2. "Tush" (instrumental)
3. "Run"

== Charts ==
| Chart (2003/2004) | Peak Position |
|---|---|
| UK Singles Chart | 34 |
| US Billboard Hot R&B/Hip-Hop Songs | 53 |
| US Billboard Hot Dance Club Play | 1 |

== See also ==
- List of number-one dance singles of 2004 (U.S.)
