= Fishscale =

Studio album by Ghostface Killah
- Released: March 28, 2006
- Genre: Hip-hop
- Length: 64:48
- Labels: Starks; Def Jam
- Producers: Sean Combs; Cool & Dre; Crack Val; Ghostface Killah; J Dilla; Just Blaze; MF Doom; MoSS; Lewis Parker; Pete Rock; Sean Cane & LV; Studio Steve; Xtreme

Ghostface Killah chronology
Put It on the Line (2005)	Fishscale (2006)	More Fish (2006)

Wu-Tang Clan solo chronology
Mr. Xcitement (2005)	Fishscale (2006)	The Resident Patient (2006)

Singles from Fishscale
- 1. "Be Easy" Released: October 25, 2005; 2. "Back Like That" Released: February 28, 2006

Fishscale is the fifth studio album by American rapper and Wu-Tang Clan member Ghostface Killah, released March 28, 2006, on Starks Enterprises and Def Jam in the United States. The album features guest appearances from every member of the Wu-Tang Clan, as well as Ghostface Killah's Theodore Unit. It also features producers such as MF Doom, Pete Rock, J Dilla, and Just Blaze, among others. The album follows an organized crime theme, and is named after a term for uncut cocaine.

Fishscale sold nearly 110,000 units in its first week of release, and debuted at number four on the Billboard 200, and number two on the Top R&B/Hip-Hop Albums chart, making it the highest charting Ghostface Killah album since his 1996 debut, Ironman. The singles "Back Like That," and "Be Easy" entered the US Hot R&B/Hip-Hop Songs chart, with the former peaking at the 14th position. Upon its release, Fishscale received universal acclaim, with critics praising the album's cohesiveness, lyricism, and production. As of November 2009, the album had sold 332,000 copies. The song "The Champ" appeared in an ad of Amazon Prime, the film Drillbit Taylor and in the video games WWE Smackdown vs. Raw 2007 and Def Jam Icon (Although the former is an edited version and the latter is a remix version).

== Background ==
In January 2006, a sampler was released containing full versions of "Be Easy," "Back Like That," and "Kilo," as well as shortened versions of "Big Girl" and "Charlie Brown". It also included an alternate version of "The Champ". "Charlie Brown," which was produced by MF Doom, contained a sample from Caetano Veloso's "Alfomega" that did not ultimately receive clearance, and the song did not appear on the final album. Similarly, "The Champ" was not cleared and an altered version found its way on to the album.

J Dilla created his two productions for Ghostface, but also used them on his instrumental album Donuts; MF Doom's productions are taken from his Special Herbs series of albums.

== Critical reception ==
Professional ratings
Aggregate scores
Source	Rating
Metacritic	88/100
Review scores
Source	Rating
AllMusic	4.5/5 stars
The A.V. Club	A
Entertainment Weekly	A−
Los Angeles Times.	3.5/4 stars
Mojo	4/5 stars
Pitchfork	9.0/10
Q	4/5 stars
Rolling Stone	4/5 stars
Spin	A−
The Village Voice	A+

Upon its release, Fishscale received universal acclaim from music critics. At Metacritic, which assigns a normalized rating out of 100 to reviews from mainstream critics, the album received an average score of 88, based on 32 reviews. Robert Christgau of The Village Voice called it a crack-trade "trend record that ranks with any Biggie or Wu CD". He found Ghostface Killah's stories to be as "vivid, brutal, and thought-out as any noir" and felt that the music features "a powerfully souled and sampled Clan-type groove" and a "screeching intensity" similar to Public Enemy's 1988 album It Takes a Nation of Millions to Hold Us Back. Writing for Entertainment Weekly, Raymond Fiore said that "he may not be reinventing himself with Fishscale, but as a must-hear street storyteller, Ghostface Killah's still at the top of his game." Matt Barone from XXL wrote that, "with a few forced collaborations being its only flaw, Fishscale is Ghost’s most addictive dosage post Supreme Clientele. Packed with vivid street tales, comic relief and straight spittin’, the album continues his standard of excellence."

Steve Jones from USA Today wrote that "Ghostface takes a timeworn hip-hop theme — dealing cocaine, and creates a riveting listening experience. He doesn't so much deliver rhymes as narrate graphically detailed scenes, rife with violence, passion and a little humor." AllMusic writer Andy Kellman wrote in his review "...Ghost responds by pouring all that he has, both lyrically and vocally, into every track on the album. The scenarios he recounts are as detailed and off-the-wall as ever, elaborate screenplays laid out with a vocal style that's ceaselessly fluid and never abrasive." In Q, Ted Kessler wrote, "Rappers rarely improve with age, but Wu-Tang Clan veteran Ghostface is the exception… Whether Ghostface's explaining how to cook crack on 'Kilo', how he likes his hair cut on 'Barbershop', or how he came to swim with 'SpongeBob in a Bentley Coupe' on 'Underwater', he remains rap's finest storyteller." In his review for The A.V. Club, Nathan Rabin wrote:

"In contrast to his aggressive delivery on The Pretty Toney Album, Ghostface is far more relaxed, confident, and eclectic here. One of rap's most cinematic and sophisticated storytellers, he fills his pulp narratives with so much novelistic detail that it's impossible to catch everything on the first listen. Thankfully, the kaleidoscopic, soul-drenched production by Doom, Pete Rock, Jay Dee, Just Blaze, and others make repeat listens seem tempting, even downright irresistible. Sure, Fishscale has its share of pointless skits. But that's what the fast-forward button is for, just as the play button seems to have been designed specifically to let people listen to Fishscale over and over again."

=== Accolades ===
Fishscale was ranked as one of the best albums of the year. It also appeared on several lists for best albums of the decade, with Stylus Magazine ranking it number eleven. Uncut ranked it number 62 on their 150 Best Albums of the 2000s, while Pitchfork ranked it number 75 on their Top 200 Albums of the 2000s, stating "History will remember Fishscale as Ghostface's Magical Mystery Tour: an artist convinced of his own genius empties every chamber on a batshit, pseudo-conceptual headtrip." In 2009, Rhapsody ranked the album at number nine on its "Hip-Hop’s Best Albums of the Decade" list. The album was also included in the book 1001 Albums You Must Hear Before You Die. In 2022, the album was ranked 131st on Rolling Stone's list of the 200 Greatest Hip-Hop Albums of All Time.

== Track listing ==
Credits adapted from the album's liner notes.

No.	Title	Writer(s)	Producer(s)	Length
1.	"The Return of Clyde Smith" (skit)			1:04
2.	"Shakey Dog"	Dennis Coles; Lewis Parker; Bryan Blackburn; Pierre Lemaire; André Popp	Lewis Parker	3:44
3.	"Kilo" (featuring Raekwon)	Coles; Jason Connoy; Corey Woods	MoSS	4:00
4.	"The Champ"	Coles; Justin Smith	Just Blaze	4:09
5.	"Major Operation" (skit)			0:06
6.	"9 Milli Bros." (performed by the Wu-Tang Clan)	Coles; Daniel Dumile; Darryl Hill; Elgin Turner; Clifford Smith; Russell Jones; Woods; Robert Diggs; Gary Grice; Lamont Hawkins; Jason Hunter; D. Thompson	MF Doom	4:14
7.	"Beauty Jackson"	Coles; James Yancey; Richie Barrett	J Dilla	1:32
8.	"Heart Street Directions" (skit)			0:54
9.	"Columbus Exchange (skit) / Crack Spot"	Coles; Lakeywen Brown; Art Posey; Josef Powell	Crack Val	2:21
10.	"R.A.G.U." (featuring Raekwon)	Coles; Pete Phillips; Woods; Hal David; Burt Bacharach	Pete Rock	2:39
11.	"Bad Mouth Kid" (skit)			1:10
12.	"Whip You With a Strap"	Coles; Yancey; Johnny Baylor; Luther Ingram; Johnny Northern; Randall Stewart	J Dilla	2:51
13.	"Back Like That" (featuring Ne-Yo)	Coles; Vernon Brown; Shaffer Smith; Willie Hutch; Shawn Carter; J. Smith; Douglas Gibbs; Randolph Johnson	Xtreme	4:02
14.	"Be Easy" (featuring Trife)	Coles; Phillips; Leon Sylvers	Pete Rock	3:19
15.	"Clipse of Doom" (featuring Trife)	Coles; Dumile; Theodore Bailey	MF Doom	3:09
16.	"Jellyfish" (featuring Cappadonna, Shawn Wigs and Trife)	Coles; Dumile; Hill; Bailey; Clifton Davis; Marvin Gaye; Ed Townsend; Harry Ray; Al Goodman; Lee Walter	MF Doom	3:50
17.	"Dogs of War" (featuring Raekwon, Cappadonna, Sun God and Trife)	Coles; Phillips; Hill; Woods; Bailey; Sylvester Stewart	Pete Rock	4:04
18.	"Barbershop"	Coles; Steve Wallace; John Fowlkes; Roger Genger	Studio Steve	1:56
19.	"Ms. Sweetwater" (skit)			0:14
20.	"Big Girl"	Coles; Lamar Bryant; Robert Douglas	Ghostface Killah	3:35
21.	"Underwater"	Coles; Dumile; Larry Mizell	MF Doom	2:03
22.	"The Ironman Takeover" (skit)			0:05
23.	"Momma" (featuring Megan Rochell)	Coles; Levar Coppin; Deleno Matthews; S. Smith; David Axelrod; Earl Palmer	Sean C & LV	4:49
24.	"Three Bricks" (bonus track) (featuring The Notorious B.I.G. and Raekwon)	Christopher Wallace; Sean Combs; Nasheim Myrick; Carlos Broady; Woods; Coles; Osten Harvey; Black Mamba; Robert Bell; Ronald Bell; James Taylor; Dennis Thomas; Meekaaeel Muhammad; George Brown; Claydes Smith; Jean-Claude Olivier; Harry Wayne Casey; Richard Finch	Cool & Dre; Sean "Diddy" Combs (co.)	4:58
25.	"Be Easy (Remix)" (bonus track) (featuring Ice Cube and Trife)	Coles; Theo Bailey; O'Shea Jackson	Pete Rock	3:21
26.	"Back Like That (Remix)" (bonus track) (featuring Kanye West and Ne-Yo)	Coles; Kanye West; Shaffer Smith	Xtreme	4:04
Total length:				64:48

Sample credits

- "The Return of Clyde Smith" (Intro) contains a sample of "Summer Dream" by Jack McDuff
- "Shakey Dog" contains a sample of "Love is Blue" by Johnny Johnson & His Bandwagon.
- "Kilo" contains a sample of "Ten is the number – kilos" by George Greer & Jimmy Vann.
- "The Champ" contains a sample of "Synthetic Substitution" by Melvin Bliss.
- "9 Milli Bros." contains a sample of "Fenugreek" by MF Doom and "Fast Cars" by RZA.
- "Beauty Jackson" contains a sample of "Maybe" by The Three Degrees and "Hi." by J Dilla.
- "Columbus Exchange" (Skit) / "Crack Spot" contains a sample of "Feed Me Your Love" by Freda Payne.
- "R.A.G.U." contains a sample of "The Look of Love" by The Delfonics.
- "Whip You With a Strap" contains a sample of "To the Other Man" by Luther Ingram and "One for Ghost" by J Dilla.
- "Back Like That" contains a sample of "Baby Come Home" by Willie Hutch and "Song Cry" by Jay-Z.
- "Be Easy" contains a sample of "Stay Away From Me" by The Sylvers and "Mighty Healthy" by Ghostface Killah.
- "Clipse of Doom" contains a sample of "Apaloosa" by Gino Vannelli and "Four Thieves Vinegar" by MF Doom.
- "Jellyfish" contains samples of "Never Can Say Goodbye" by Dennis Coffey, "Let's Get It On" by Marvin Gaye, "Special Lady" by Ray, Goodman & Brown and "Sumac Berries" by MF Doom.
- "Dogs of War" contains samples of "Family Affair" by Sly & the Family Stone.
- "Barbershop" contains a sample of "You’d Better Believe It" by The Manhattans.
- "Big Girl" contains samples of "You’re A Big Girl Now" by The Stylistics and "Strung Out" by William Bell.
- "Underwater" contains a sample of "Orange Blossoms" by MF Doom.
- "Momma" contains a sample of "Wandering Star" by David Axelrod.
- "Three Bricks" contains samples of "Niggas Bleed" and "Somebody's Gotta Die" by The Notorious B.I.G.

== Personnel ==
- Ghostface Killah – performer, producer, executive producer
- Raekwon – performer
- Trife – performer
- Sun God – performer
- Cappadonna – performer
- Shawn Wigs – performer
- RZA – performer
- GZA – performer
- Method Man – performer
- Inspectah Deck – performer
- U-God – performer
- Masta Killa – performer
- Ol' Dirty Bastard – performer
- The Notorious B.I.G. – performer
- Ne-Yo – vocals
- Megan Rochell – vocals
- Candice Wilson – vocals
- Jonathan Doyle – vocals
- Rob Mathes – bass, guitar, horn arrangements
- Tom Timko – alto sax
- Jeff Kievit – trumpet
- Birch Johnson – trombone
- Ken Lewis – multi instruments, producer
- MF Doom – producer
- Pete Rock – producer
- J Dilla – producer
- Just Blaze – producer, engineer
- MoSS – producer

- Sean Cane & LV – producer
- Cool & Dre – producer
- Sean Combs – producer
- Lewis Parker – producer
- Crack Val – producer
- Xtreme – producer
- Studio Steve – producer
- Mario "Big O" Caruso – producer, executive producer, management
- Scutch Robinson – executive producer
- Shawn Carter – executive producer
- Christos Tsantilis – engineer, editing
- David Brown – engineer, mixing assistant
- Morgan Garcia – engineer
- Stephen Glicken – engineer
- Mike Tocci – engineer
- Andrew Wright – engineer
- Jason Goldstein – mixing
- Gimel Keaton – mixing
- Nikos Teneketzis – mixing
- Joe Stewart – engineer, mixing
- Tony Dawsey – mastering
- Terese Joseph – A&R
- Patrick "Plain Pat" Reynolds – A&R
- Ashaunna Ayars – marketing
- Tai Linzie – photography, art coordinator
- F. Scott Schafer – photography
- Alli Truch – creative director
- Dawud West – design, logo
- Lyani Powers – set design

== Charts ==
=== Weekly charts ===
Chart (2006)	Peak position
Norwegian Albums (VG-lista)	37
Swiss Albums (Schweizer Hitparade)	66
UK Albums (Official Charts)	174
US Billboard 200	4
US Top R&B/Hip-Hop Albums (Billboard)	2
US Top Rap Albums (Billboard)	2

=== Year-end charts ===
Chart (2006)	Position
US Top R&B/Hip-Hop Albums (Billboard)	58
