= 718 (album) =

Studio album by Theodore Unit
- Released: August 3, 2004
- Recorded: 2003–04
- Studio: Audiovision Studios (Miami, FL); Circle House Studios (Miami, FL); Redline Studios (Staten Island, NY); Sound on Sound Studios (New York, NY)
- Genre: Hip-hop
- Length: 46:56
- Label: Starks; Sure Shot
- Producer: CL (exec.); Ghostface Killah (exec.); Mike Caruso (exec.); Anthony Acid; Cilvaringz; Dirty Dean; DJ Skillspinz; D-Prosper; Emile; K-Def; Milestone; Nexus; Self; Smith Bros

Ghostface Killah chronology
The Pretty Toney Album (2004)	718 (2004)	Put It on the Line (2005)

Trife Da God chronology
718 (2004)	Put It on the Line (2005)

Singles from 718
- 1. "Guerilla Hood" Released: 2003

718 is the only studio album by American hip-hop group Theodore Unit. It was released on August 3, 2004, through Ghostface Killah's Starks Enterprises and Sure Shot Recordings. Recording sessions took place at Audiovision Studios and Circle House Studios in Miami, and Redline Studios and Sound On Sound Studios in New York from the same sessions for The Pretty Toney Album. Production was handled by K-Def, Emile Haynie, Anthony Acid, Cilvaringz, Dirty Dean, D. Prosper, Milestone, Nexus, Self, the Smith Bros., and DJ Skillspinz, with CL, Ghostface Killah and Mike Caruso serving as executive producers. Composed of Ghostface Killah, Trife Da God, Solomon Childs, Shawn Wigs, Kryme Life, Cappadonna and Du-Lilz, it features guest appearances from Bone Crusher, Kline, Method Man and Streetlife.

The album debuted at number 66 on the Top R&B/Hip-Hop Albums chart and number 38 on the Independent Albums chart in the United States.

== Critical reception ==
Professional ratings
Review scores
Source	Rating
AllMusic	4/5 stars
Pitchfork	7/10
Prefix	7/10
RapReviews	8/10

AllMusic's David Jeffries felt the record was more than "a scattershot bunch of leftovers surrounded by lesser rappers", praising the 1986 "over-the-top excitement" throughout the track listing while also displaying the "so fresh, so now, so underground sound". He also praised Ghostface, Trife and Method Man for their performances, but felt the other crew members did not distinguish themselves with their contributions. Jeffries concluded that "the album bounces between the raw and polished, and half of it is leftovers, but too many highlights to mention make it flow just fine." William Ketchum III of RapReviews praised Trife's "raw, authoritative flow and exceptional punchline prowess" on "Punch In Punch Out", "Paychecks", "88 Freestyle" and "Who Are We?", but was mixed on the other members, singaling out Solomon Childs' "slow, dragging flow" not being ideal for solo outings. Pitchfork contributor Sam Ubl called it "a nice, if unnecessary, accessory" to The Pretty Toney Album, praising Ghostface's "tic-addled vehemence" in his lyrics while delivering more introspection and a "touching vulnerability" on "Mama Can You Hear Me" and "Who Are We?", and critiqued that Trife was Ghostface's "closest competitor" on the album when delivering quality verses, concluding that: "Commercially feasible or not, 718 features enough stylish production and idiosyncratic rapping to service Ghostface's reputation while providing the Theodore Unit stable with a cornerstone for its own."

== Track listing ==
No.	Title	Producer(s)	Length
1.	"Guerilla Hood" (performed by Ghostface Killah)	Cilvaringz	3:19
2.	"Punch In Punch Out" (performed by Trife Da God)		2:44
3.	"88 Freestyle" (performed by Ghostface Killah and Trife Da God)		2:10
4.	"The Drummer" (performed by Ghostface Killah and Trife Da God featuring Method Man and Streetlife)	Self	2:47
5.	"Gatz" (performed by Shawn Wiggs, Ghostface Killah and Solomon Childs)	Anthony Acid	2:21
6.	"Who Are We?" (performed by Ghostface Killah and Trife Da God featuring Bone Crusher)	Dirty Dean	3:38
7.	"Smith Brothers" (performed by Ghostface Killah and Trife Da God)	The Smith Brothers	3:18
8.	"Mama Can You Hear Me" (performed by Solomon Childs)	Nexus	3:49
9.	"Paychecks" (performed by Ghostface Killah and Trife Da God)	D Prosper; K-Def (co.)	2:57
10.	"Wicked With Lead" (performed by Ghostface Killah and Trife Da God)	K-Def	2:45
11.	"Daily Routine" (performed by Shawn Wigs)	Emile	1:58
12.	"Right Back" (performed by Trife Da God and Kryme Life)		2:49
13.	"Pass the Mic" (performed by Du-Lilz, Shawn Wigs, Trife Da God, Solomon Childs, Ghostface Killah and Cappadonna)	K-Def	2:58
14.	"Work" (performed by Solomon Childs)	DJ Skillspinz	2:57
15.	"It's the Unit" (performed by Shawn Wigs, Cappadonna and Ghostface Killah featuring Kline)	Emile	2:42
16.	"Be My Girl" (performed by Solomon Childs)	Milestone	3:44
Total length:			46:56

== Personnel ==
- Dennis "Ghostface Killah" Coles – main artist, vocals (tracks: 1, 3–7, 9, 10, 13, 15), executive producer
- Theo "Trife" Bailey – main artist, vocals (tracks: 2–4, 6, 7, 9, 10, 12, 13)
- Walbert "Solomon Childs" Dale – main artist, vocals (tracks: 5, 8, 13, 14, 16)
- Shawn "Wiggs" Simons – main artist, vocals (tracks: 5, 11, 13, 15)
- Anthony "Kryme Life" Jones – main artist, vocals (tracks: 12, 13)
- Darryl "Cappadonna" Hill – main artist, vocals (tracks: 13, 15)
- Du-Lilz – main artist, vocals (track 13)
- Clifford "Method Man" Smith – featured artist, vocals (track 4)
- Patrick "Streetlife" Charles – featured artist, vocals (track 4)
- Wayne "Bone Crusher" Hardnett – featured artist, vocals (track 6)
- Kline – featured artist, vocals (track 15)
- Tarik "Cilvaringz" Azzougarh – producer (track 1)
- Self – producer (track 4)
- Anthony "Acid" Caputo – producer (track 5), mixing & recording (tracks: 2, 5, 8, 10, 12–14, 16)
- Dirty Dean – producer (track 6)
- Smith Bros. – producer (track 7)
- Nexus – producer (track 8)
- Derick "Mastermind" Prosper – producer (track 9)
- Kevin "K-Def" Hansford – producer (tracks: 10, 13), co-producer (track 9)
- Emile Haynie – producer & mixing (tracks: 11, 15)
- Antonio "DJ Skillspinz" Biggers – producer (track 14)
- Milestone – producer (track 16)
- Stephen "Spidey" Glicken – mixing & recording (tracks: 1, 7)
- Mike Caruso – executive producer, management
- CL – executive producer
- Mario Caruso – associate producer
- Rok One – art direction
- Kaysh Shinn – photography
- DJ Phantom – A&R
- Jonathan Kaslow – A&R
- Walter Free – project coordinator

== Charts ==
Chart (2004)	Peak position
US Top R&B/Hip-Hop Albums (Billboard)	66
US Independent Albums (Billboard)	38
