= Twelve Reasons to Die II =

Studio album by Ghostface Killah and Adrian Younge
- Released: July 10, 2015
- Recorded: 2014–2015
- Genre: Hip hop
- Length: 31:46
- Label: Linear Labs
- Producer: Adrian Younge

Ghostface Killah and Adrian Younge chronology
Sour Soul (2015)	Twelve Reasons to Die II (2015)	Czarface Meets Ghostface (2019)

Twelve Reasons to Die II is the second collaborative studio album by American rapper Ghostface Killah and American composer Adrian Younge. It is the sequel to their 2013 album Twelve Reasons to Die. The album was released on July 10, 2015, by Linear Labs. It features guest appearances from Raekwon, RZA, Scarub, Vince Staples, Lyrics Born, Chino XL and Bilal.

== Critical reception ==
Professional ratings
Aggregate scores
Source	Rating
Metacritic	72/100
Review scores
Source	Rating
AllMusic	4/5 stars
Consequence of Sound	B−
Exclaim!	7/10
The Guardian	4/5 stars
HipHopDX	3.5/5 stars
NME	8/10
Now	3/5 stars
Pitchfork	7.2/10
PopMatters	7/10
Spin	6/10

Twelve Reasons to Die II received generally positive reviews from music critics. At Metacritic, which assigns a normalized rating out of 100 to reviews from mainstream critics, the album received an average score of 72 based on 18 reviews, which indicates "generally favorable reviews". David Jeffries of AllMusic said, "Like the films Superman 2 and Aliens, the concept LP Twelve Reasons to Die II meets, and for action junkies exceeds, the high standard set by its predecessor." Dan Caffrey of Consequence of Sound said, "If we’re only judging Twelve Reasons to Die II on this kind of story-driven criteria, then it’s a knockout. As with its predecessor, the narrative is a marriage of exploitation horror and urban street drama, an elaboration on the kind of grit-meets-gimmick composition that the various members of Wu-Tang Clan have been pulling off for over two decades."

Sheldon Pearce of Pitchfork Media said, "If Twelve Reasons to Die is a comic, then its sequel is the cinematic adaptation or a reboot of the franchise; the source material is the same, but the execution is tightened in places. It has a bigger-budget feel—stronger guests, better pacing, and a more careful consideration for its audience." Kevin Ritchie of Now said, "What it lacks is an interesting emotional – and thus truly cinematic – dimension. The vast majority of lyrics are either narrative exposition or revelling in the primordial thrill of gangsterism, and Ghostface rarely delves beneath the violent macho facade. When he does, it’s only during the climactic and clichéd moment of rebirth." Jesse Fairfax of HipHopDX said, "The majority of Twelve Reasons To Die II is Adrian Younge’s mere reinterpretation of Ghostface Killah’s beloved crime tales. “Black Out” comes close to a vintage feel, but the tracks ultimately distract from the album's plot. Narrated by RZA, the surprise ending sets up an inevitable yet unnecessary third part to come down the line."

== Track listing ==
- All songs are produced by Adrian Younge.

No.	Title	Writer(s)	Length
1.	"Powerful One"	Adrian Younge	0:51
2.	"Return of the Savage" (featuring Raekwon & RZA)	Younge; Raekwon; Ghostface Killah; C.E. Garcia	3:12
3.	"King of New York" (featuring Raekwon)	Younge; Ghostface Killah; Raekwon	3:31
4.	"Rise Up" (featuring Scarub)	Younge; Ghostface Killah; Scarub	2:04
5.	"Daily News"	Younge; Ghostface Killah	0:49
6.	"Get the Money" (featuring Vince Staples)	Younge; Ghostface Killah; Vince Staples	4:15
7.	"Death's Invitation" (Interlude) (featuring RZA)	Younge; Garcia	0:36
8.	"Death's Invitation" (featuring Chino XL, Lyrics Born & Scarub)	Younge; Ghostface Killah; Scarub; Lyrics Born; Chino XL	4:33
9.	"Let the Record Spin" (Interlude) (featuring RZA)	Younge; Garcia	1:15
10.	"Let the Record Spin" (featuring Raekwon)	Younge; Ghostface Killah; Raekwon	3:13
11.	"Blackout" (featuring Raekwon)	Younge; Ghostface Killah; Raekwon	1:55
12.	"Resurrection Morning" (featuring Raekwon & Bilal)	Younge; Ghostface Killah; Raekwon	2:41
13.	"Life's a Rebirth" (featuring RZA)	Younge; Ghostface Killah; Garcia	2:51

== Charts ==
Chart (2015)	Peak position
US Top R&B/Hip-Hop Albums (Billboard)	14
US Indie Store Album Sales (Billboard)	11
US Independent Albums (Billboard)	11
