= Set the Tone (Guns & Roses) =

Studio album by Ghostface Killah
- Released: May 10, 2024
- Recorded: 2019–2024
- Genre: Hip-hop
- Length: 52:55
- Label: Mass Appeal Records
- Producer: Bam Beatzz; Bundy; Danny Caiazzo; EZ Elpee; David Fourth; Ghostface Killah; Greg G.S.; Ben Grimm; Jewelz Polaar; Now & Laterz; Producer Plug; Ray Ray Scavo III; T the Human; Trufacez; Vital; "Studio" Steve Wallace

Ghostface Killah chronology
Ghostface Killahs (2019)	Set the Tone (Guns & Roses) (2024)	Supreme Clientele 2 (2025)

Singles from Set the Tone
- 1. "Scar Tissue" Released: May 3, 2024; 2. "No Face" Released: May 31, 2024

Professional ratings
Aggregate scores
Source	Rating
Metacritic	55/100
Review scores
Source	Rating
Beats Per Minute	40%
Clash	7/10
RapReviews	5/10

Set the Tone (Guns & Roses) is the twelfth studio album by American rapper Ghostface Killah. It was released on May 10, 2024, through Mass Appeal Records. The album features guest appearances from Jim Jones, Sheek Louch, Method Man, Raekwon, Nas, Kanye West and more.

== Background ==
On May 1, 2024, Ghostface Killah announced the album, with its first single, "Scar Tissue" featuring Nas, arriving two days later. The album's cover art and track listing were revealed on May 6.

== Track listing ==
Set the Tone (Guns & Roses) track listing
No.	Title	Writer(s)	Producer(s)	Length
1.	"6 Minutes" (featuring Jim Jones, Sheek Louch, and Harl3y)	Dennis Coles; Sean Jacobs; Joseph Jones II; Harold Motley III; Jewelz Polaar	Jewelz Polaar; Producer Plug	3:39
2.	"Pair of Hammers" (with Method Man)	Coles; Clifford Smith Jr.; Steve Wallace	"Studio" Steve Wallace	2:36
3.	"Skate Odyssey" (featuring October London and Raekwon)	Coles; October London; Corey Woods	Ghostface Killah	3:38
4.	"Scar Tissue" (with Nas)	Coles; Nasir Jones	T the Human	2:58
5.	"Kilo in the Safe" (featuring Iceman)	Coles; Rafael Recio	David Fourth	2:28
6.	"Skit 1"	Coles		0:41
7.	"No Face" (with Kanye West)	Coles; Lamont Porter; Kanye West	EZ Elpee	4:35
8.	"Champion Sound" (featuring Beniton)	Coles; Karl Zanders	Ghostface Killah; Danny Caiazzo	2:45
9.	"Cape Fear" (with Fat Joe featuring Harl3y)	Coles; Joseph Cartagena; Motley	Ray Ray Scavo III	2:51
10.	"Skit 2"	Coles		0:53
11.	"Plan B" (featuring Harl3y)	Coles; Motley	Bundy; Greg G.S.	3:27
12.	"Bad Bitch" (with Ja Rule featuring Trevor Jackson)	Coles; Jeffrey Atkins	Bam Beatzz	3:03
13.	"Locked In" (with AZ featuring Bee-B)	Coles; Brittany Barber; Anthony Cruz; Scavo	Scavo	3:13
14.	"Skit 3"	Coles		0:58
15.	"Touch You" (featuring Shaun Wiah)	Coles	Vital	3:14
16.	"Shots" (with Busta Rhymes and Serani featuring Harl3y)	Coles; Ben Grimm; Craig Marsh; Motley; Trevor Smith Jr.	Ben Grimm; Now & Laterz; Producer Plug	3:25
17.	"Trap Phone" (featuring Chucky Hollywood)	Coles; Devere Coles	Scavo	4:36
18.	"Outro Skit"	Coles		0:44
19.	"Yupp!" (featuring Remy Ma; bonus track)	Coles; Reminisce Mackie	Trufacez	3:02
Total length:				52:55

== Personnel ==
- Ghostface Killah – lead vocals
- Mike Bozzi – mastering
- Jun Kim – mixing, engineering assistance
- David Kim – mix engineering
- Ray Ray Scavo III – recording

== Charts ==
Chart performance for Set the Tone (Guns & Roses)
Chart (2024)	Peak position
UK Album Downloads (Official Charts)	45
UK R&B Albums (Official Charts)	39
