= Be Easy (Ghostface Killah song) =

Single by Ghostface Killah featuring Trife da God

from the album Fishscale and Music from and Inspired by the Motion Picture Waist Deep
- Released: October 25, 2005
- Recorded: 2005
- Genre: Hip hop
- Length: 3:19
- Label: Def Jam
- Songwriter(s): D. Coles; L. Sylvers; P. Phillips
- Producer(s): Pete Rock

Ghostface Killah singles chronology
"On My Knees" (2004)	"Be Easy" (2005)	"Back Like That" (2006)

Trife Da God singles chronology
"Milk Em'" (2005)	"Be Easy" (2005)

"Be Easy" is the first single by rapper Ghostface Killah from his critically acclaimed fifth solo album Fishscale. Initially released through mixtapes, it features Ghostface's Theodore Unit protégé Trife da God. The song contains a sample of "Stay Away From Me" as performed by The Sylvers. It was later included within the soundtrack to the action-drama film Waist Deep. The album Fishscale included an alternate version of the song with a verse from Ice Cube.

== Track listings ==
=== A Side ===
1. "Be Easy" (Radio)
2. "Be Easy" (LP)
3. "Be Easy" (Instrumental)

=== B Side ===
1. "Be Easy" (Radio)
2. "Be Easy" (LP)
3. "Be Easy" (Instrumental)

=== Remix ===
1. "Be Easy" (Remix)
2. "Future Thug"
3. "NY Wildstyle" (Remix)
4. "NY Wildstyle"
5. "Kilo"

Chart (2002)	Peak Position
U.S. Billboard Hot R&B/Hip-Hop Songs	91
U.S. Billboard Hot R&B/Hip-Hop Singles Sales	45
