= Theodore Unit =

American hip-hop collective

- Origin: Staten Island, New York City, U.S.
- Genre: Hip-hop
- Years active: 2001–present
- Label: Starks Enterprises.
- Members: Ghostface Killah; Trife Diesel; Shawn Wigs; Sun God; Cappadonna
- Past members: Du-Lilz; T.W.I.Z. Kryme Life; Solomon Childs

Theodore Unit is a collective of Staten Island rappers associated with Wu-Tang Clan rapper Ghostface Killah. The name "Theodore" is derived from "The Open Door", meaning the group acts as an open door to rappers who can prove themselves. It has also been stated it stands for "The Doers", as in those with initiative and will.

== History ==
The group's origins begin with Ghostface's 2001 album, Bulletproof Wallets, on the track "Theodore", which featured rappers Trife Diesel and Twiz, both of whom would become members of Ghost's posse. (Though Twiz was also formerly of Raekwon's crew American Cream Team) Trife, along with Kryme Life, would leave their trio T.M.F. to join the newly named "Theodore Unit", as would Shawn Wigs and Du-Lilz of Othorized F.A.M. The crew was initially supposed to include Raekwon and Polite, but they then chose to form on their own, as Cream Team had been dissolved and they were launching Ice Water. Instead, the line-up held together with Solomon Childs and long-standing Wu-affiliate Cappadonna, as features on Theodore Unit's debut album, 718 (named after the Stapleton, Staten Island area code in which they all reside). However, the album would largely feature Trife da God and - naturally - Ghostface Killah, with only solitary appearances from Kryme Life and Du-Lilz; Twiz was not featured. (Indeed, he was to not be part of neither Cream Team nor Theodore for too long).

Solomon Childs, while having the third-largest presence on the album, left the group for unknown reasons in 2005. The following month, Ghostface Killah and Trife da God's Put It on the Line was released, which featured Kryme Life, Shawn Wigs, and Theodore Unit newcomer Sun God, who is also Ghostface's son. The album also had the notable presence of Trife's former T.M.F. bandmate Tommy Whispers. A mixtape was released the next year, featuring mostly Ghost and Trife called NY's Backbone.

In recent years, the group has made guest appearances on Ghostface's 2006 albums Fishscale, More Fish (the Theodore logo even appears on the cover), The Big Doe Rehab and the album Apollo Kids.

== Discography ==
=== Studio albums ===
- 718 (2004)

=== Mixtapes ===
- NY's Backbone (hosted by J-Love) (2006)

=== Singles ===
- Paychecks/Wicked with Lead (SSR 1014 12") Sure Shot Records
