= Trife Diesel =

Trife
- Also known as: Trife Diesel; Trife Da God
- Born: Theo Bailey; July 11, 1980 (age 46); Stapleton, Staten Island, New York City, New York, U.S.
- Genres: Hip-hop
- Occupation: Rapper
- Labels: Starks Enterprises; Diesel Music Group
- Member of: Theodore Unit

Theodore Bailey (born on July 11, 1980 in Stapleton, Staten Island), professionally known by his stage names Trife Da God and Trife Diesel (or simply Trife), is an American rapper from New York affiliated with the Wu-Tang Clan. He is a protégé and close associate of Ghostface Killah and a member of groups T.M.F. and Theodore Unit.

He started his career on fellow Wu-Tang affiliate Shyheim's 1999 Manchild, and was featured in The Pretty Toney Album on the album's opener "Biscuits". A Theodore Unit album and mixtape followed. In November 2005 he released the album Put It on the Line with Ghostface Killah, packaged with a DVD of Ghostface in concert. He has also appeared on the early 2006 Ghostface album Fishscale on the tracks "Be Easy", "Clipse of Doom", "Jellyfish", and "Dogs of War" as well as on "Miguel Sanchez", "Guns N' Razors", "Good", "Josephine (Remix)" and "Grew Up Hard" from Ghostface's late 2006 album More Fish.

He has in also recorded with many artists outside of Wu-Tang, such as Ali & Gipp, Bonecrusher, Saigon, Jae Millz, Tragedy Khadafi, Black Thought, Nate Dogg, Termanology, AC, and Tru Life. He was also featured on "Ooh Wee", the lead single from Mark Ronson's debut album, Here Comes the Fuzz.

== Discography ==
=== Studio albums ===
- 718 with Theodore Unit (2004)
- Put It on the Line with Ghostface Killah (2005)
- Better Late Than Never (2009)
- 780 with DJ M-80 (2018)

=== Mixtapes ===
- NY's Backbone with Theodore Unit (2006)
- The Project Pope (2018)
- The Project Pope II (2018)
