= Symbolyc One production discography =

Production discography

The following list is a discography of production by Symbolyc One (S1), an American hip hop record producer from Waco, Texas. It includes a list of songs produced, co-produced and remixed by year, artist, album and title.

== 2002 ==
=== Strange Fruit Project – From Divine ===
- 01. "Intro"
- 02. "Feel"
- 03. "Stand Up"
- 04. "A Place"
- 05. "Ooh Wee
- 06. "Waitin'"
- 07. "Clap Yo Hands"
- 08. "Aquatic Groove"
- 09. "In the Garden"
- 10. "Keep It Moving"
- 11. "Tropical Rum"
- 12. "Maintain" (Liquid Soul Mix)
- 13. "Hypnotix"
- 14. "The Night/Outro"
- 16. "Form Divine"

== 2004 ==
=== Strange Fruit Project – Soul Travelin' ===
- 01. "Intro"
- 02. "Luv Is"
- 03. "The Dotted Line"
- 04. "Cloud Nine"
- 05. "All the Way"
- 06. "Move"
- 07. "Honey"
- 08. "Oh Yeah"
- 10. "Recreate"
- 11. "Soul Travelin'"
- 12. "Oxygen"
- 13. "Remember My Face"
- 14. "Strange"
- 15. "Speed Bump"
- 16. "Gotta Lotta"
- 17. "In the Sun"
- 18. "Long Way"

== 2005 ==
=== Ghostface Killah & Trife da God ===
- "Milk Em" (Strange Fruit Project Version)

=== Symbolyc One (S1) & Illmind – The Art of Onemind ===
- 01. "Art of Onemind (Intro)" (co-produced with Illmind)
- 03. "Neva Gone Change" (featuring Supastition)
- 05. "Hush" (featuring Deloach, Myone & Kay)
- 07. "Blue Notes" (featuring Free Agents, Oneself & Myone)
- 09. "Night Like This" (featuring Darien Brockington & Big Pooh)
- 11. "The Groove" (featuring Organic Thoughts)
- 14. "Onemind" (featuring El Da Sensei & Chip Fu)
- 16. "Guilty Pleasures" (featuring Ken Starr and Thesis)

== 2006 ==
=== Strange Fruit Project – The Healing ===
- 01. "Intro"
- 02. "Ready Forum"
- 04. "Under Pressure"
- 05. "Good Times"
- 12. "Cali Cruisin'" (featuring Deloach & Bavu)
- 13. "Parachutes" (featuring Thesis)
- 14. "God Is" (featuring Darien Brockington & Yahzarah)
- 15. "After The Healing..." (featuring Verbal Seed, K-Otix, Tahiti, Skotch & Kay)

=== Darien Brockington – Somebody to Love ===
- 11. "He Will Break Your Heart"

== 2007 ==
=== Strange Fruit Project – College Hoops 2K8 Video Game/Soundtrack ===
- "Underclassmen"
- "Through The Lane"

=== Yolanda Johnson – Meta Music Recordings Presents Soulsicle Vol. 1 ===
- 01. "Intervention" (featuring T3)

== 2008 ==
=== Symbolyc One (S1) – The Music Box ===
- 01. "Intro/Music Box" (featuring Speech)
- 02. "Mash" (featuring Rapper Big Pooh & Kay)
- 03. "Everybody Clap" (featuring Lifesavas & Tanya Morgan)
- 04. "Neva" (featuring Tone Trezure)
- 05. "Next Level" (featuring AEONZ)
- 06. "Life Is a Movie"(featuring Rah Digga)
- 07. "Chemistry"(featuring Yolanda Johnson)
- 08. "Callin' Me" (featuring Phonte)
- 09. "Know Your Name" (featuring Mojoe, The Ill, HeadKrack)
- 10. "Who Stole the Music" (featuring Knessecary, Bavu Blakes, Glenn Reynolds)
- 11. "Be Sure" (featuring DV Alias Khryst)
- 12. "Jimmy Swag Art" (featuring Strange Fruit Project & Dawg Wonder)
- 13. "Upper Echelon" (featuring Skyzoo, Supastition, Dow Jones)
- 14. "Tire" (featuring Darien Brockington)

=== Tanya Morgan – Brooklynati ===
- 17. "Tanya Likes Girls"

=== Spider Loc – Connected 4 ===
- 07. "Betta Believe It" (featuring Kartoon & Mr. Fab)

=== Stacy Epps – The Awakening ===
- 05. "Heaven" (featuring Bilal Salaam)

== 2009 ==
=== Juice – Position of Power ===
- 06. "I Am Legend" (featuring Ya Boy)
- 08. "Diamonds" (featuring Don Cannon)
- 10. "It Is What It Is" (featuring The Counsel)

=== Juice ===
- "I Luv It"

=== Speech – The Grown Folks Table ===
- 05. Start Spreading the News (featuring Chali 2na & Jahi)

=== Symbolyc One (S1) – Still Underrated Mixtape: Volume 1 ===
- 06. "Supa Fly" (featuring Inspectah Deck & Blu)
- 13. "I Get Money" (featuring Young Buck & Vohnbeatz)
- 19. "Diamonds" (featuring Nipsey Hussle)

=== Strange Fruit Project – M.A.S.K. (Making Art Sound Kool) ===
- 01. "M.A.S.K. Intro" (co-produced with Caleb)
- 04. "Sepia Tone"
- 05. "Day by Day" (featuring Supastition)
- 06. "Fresh for Life" (co-produced with Caleb)
- 07. "Sunrays (With Me)"
- 08. "Why Does Summer Have to End" (co-produced with Caleb)

=== Supastition – Splitting Image ===
- 04. "Splitting Image" (Neenah)

=== Symbolyc One (S1) & Braille – Cloud Nineteen ===
- 01. "SkyDive"
- 02. "It's Nineteen" (featuring Rob Swift)
- 03. "For Life"
- 04. "Broken Heart" (featuring Ragen Fykes, Strange Fruit Project & Thesis)
- 05. "That's My Word" (featuring Theory Hazit & Rob Swift)
- 06. "Fill It In" (featuring DJ Idull)
- 07. "Skepticold"
- 08. "Heart of God"
- 09. "Found Her"
- 10. "From The Pulpit"
- 11. "Megaphone Phonics" (featuring Vursatyl)
- 12. "Work That Way"
- 13. "HardRock" (featuring Ohmega Watts, Othello & Lightheaded)
- 14. "Stay Together" (featuring Ragen Fykes)
- 15. "Parachutes & Ladders"
- 16. "Frankenstein"

== 2010 ==
=== Kanye West – My Beautiful Dark Twisted Fantasy ===
- 03. "Power" (co-produced with Kanye West)

=== Rhymefest – El Che ===
- 03. "Say Wassup" (featuring Phonte) (co-produced with Caleb)
- 04. "How High" (featuring Little Brother & Darien Brockington) (co-produced with Caleb)
- 05. "Chocolates"
- 06. "One Hand Push Up"

=== Little Brother – Leftback ===
- 09. "After the Party" (S1 & Caleb's Who Shot JR Ewing Remix) (featuring Carlitta Durand) (co-produced with Caleb)

=== Stat Quo – Statlanta ===
- 10. "Alright" (co-produced with Caleb)

=== Yahzarah – The Ballad of Purple St. James ===
- 01. "Strike Up the Band" (co-produced with Caleb)

=== Strange Fruit Project – A Dreamer's Journey ===
- 01. "A Dreamer's Intro"
- 02. "I'm Goin' Far" (featuring Pumah)
- 03. "Heartbeat"
- 04. "Bigger Than Me" (featuring Trey)
- 05. "How Strange Is That"
- 06. "1, 2"
- 07. "Daydreamin'" (featuring Grey)
- 08. "Gotta Move" (featuring Yolanda Johnson)
- 09. "Big Time" (featuring Grey & Rhymefest)
- 10. "Freedom" (featuring Verbal Seed & Tone Trezure)
- 11. "Bright Lights"
- 12. "Needy 2 U"
- 13. "Seeing Is Believing"

=== Laws – 5:01 Overtime ===
- 19. "So Nice" (featuring Jason Caesar) (co-produced by Caleb)

== 2011 ==
=== Beyoncé – 4 ===
- 04. "Best Thing I Never Had" (produced with Babyface, Caleb, Antonio Dixon, Beyoncé, Shea Taylor)

=== Median – The Sender ===
- 04. "Turn Ya On" (featuring Phonte and Big Remo)

=== Phonte – Charity Starts At Home ===
- 09. "Gonna Be A Beautiful Night" (featuring Carlitta Durand) (co-produced with Caleb)

=== Jay-Z & Kanye West – Watch the Throne ===
- 10. "Murder to Excellence" (co-produced with Swizz Beatz)

=== Talib Kweli – Gutter Rainbows ===
- 05. "Mr. International" (featuring Nigel Hall)
- 07. "Wait for You" (featuring Kendra Ross)

=== Juice – American Me ===
- 09. "Nothing In This World"

== 2012 ==
=== Lecrae – Church Clothes ===
- 10. "The Price Of Life" (featuring Andy Mineo & Co Campbell)

=== Xzibit – Napalm ===
- 08. "Stand Tall" (featuring Slim the Mobster) (co-produced by M-Phazes)
- 12. "Meaning of Life"

=== Various Artists – The Man with the Iron Fists (soundtrack) ===
- 11. "Tick, Tock" (featuring Pusha T, Raekwon, Joell Ortiz & Danny Brown) (produced with Frank Dukes)

=== The Game – Jesus Piece ===
- 15. "Blood Diamonds" (Deluxe Edition track)

=== 50 Cent – Street King Immortal ===
- 00. "My Life" (featuring Eminem & Adam Levine)

== 2013 ==
=== Talib Kweli – Prisoner of Conscious ===
- 08. Push Thru (featuring Curren$y, Kendrick Lamar & Glen Reynolds)
- 10. Delicate Flowers (co-produced by Caleb McCampbell)

=== Kanye West – Yeezus ===
- 09. Guilt Trip (co-produced by Arca, Travis Scott, Mike Dean & Ackeejuice Rockers)

=== Stalley – Honest Cowboy ===
- 10. "Gettin' By"

=== Sivion – Group Therapy ===
- 05. "The Best" (featuring DJ Manwell)

=== Eminem – The Marshall Mathers LP 2 ===
- 01. "Bad Guy"

== 2014 ==
=== Roc C & Rapper Big Pooh – Trouble In the Neighborhood ===
- 01. "Set It Off"
- 06. "Handle It"

=== Logic – Under Pressure ===
- 06. "Bounce"
- 12. "Till the End"

== 2015 ==
=== Lupe Fiasco – Tetsuo & Youth ===
- 03. "Blur My Hands" (featuring Guy Sebastian) (co-produced by M-Phazes)
- 07. "Body Of Work" (featuring Troi & Terrace Martin) (co-produced by Vohn Beatz)
- 08. "Little Death" (featuring Nikki Jean) (co-produced by Vohn Beatz)

=== The Game – The Documentary 2 ===
- 08. "Last Time You Seen" (featuring Scarface & Stacy Barthe)

=== Gladys Knight – TBD ===
- "Just a Little" (co-produced by Avehre)

== 2016 ==
=== Lecrae – Church Clothes 3 ===
- Executive producer
- 01. "Freedom" (featuring N'Dambi) (co-produced by Epikh Pro and VohnBeatz)
- 02. "Gangland" (featuring Propaganda) (co-produced by Shindo)
- 03. "Deja Vu"
- 05. "Cruising" (co-produced by Epikh Pro)
- 06. "It Is What It Is" (co-produced by Epikh Pro)
- 08. "Forever"
- 09. "Misconceptions 3" (featuring John Givez, JGivens and Jackie Hill Perry)

=== Royce da 5'9" – Layers ===
- 01. "Tabernacle" (co-produced by J. Rhodes)
- 13. "America" (co-produced by Epikh)
- 16. "Gottaknow" (co-produced by Epikh)

== 2017 ==
=== Drake – More Life ===
- 21. "Ice Melts" (featuring Young Thug) (produced with Supah Mario)

=== Lorde – Melodrama ===
- 07. "Sober II (Melodrama)" (additional production)

=== Phora – Yours Truly Forever ===
- 03. "Facts" (produced with Eskupe & Anthro Beats)

=== Lil Uzi Vert – Luv Is Rage 2 ===
- 19. "Loaded" (produced with TM88)

== 2018 ==
=== Royce da 5'9" - Book of Ryan ===
- 4. "Caterpillar" (featuring Eminem, Logic and King Green) (produced with Epikh Pro)
- 6. "Dumb" (featuring Boogie) (produced with Epikh Pro)
- 13. "Amazing" (featuring Melanie Rutherford) (produced with Epikh Pro)

=== Lil Xan – Total Xanarchy ===
- 6. "Saved by the Bell" (produced with Lonestarrmuzik, Oshi & Krs. )

=== Eminem – Kamikaze ===
- 5. "Normal" (produced with Swish Allnet, Illa da Producer & Lonestarrmuzik)
- 11. "Nice Guy" (featuring Jessie Reyez) (produced with Fred Ball & Eminem)

=== Lupe Fiasco – Drogas Wave ===
- 4. "Gold vs. the Right Things to Do" (produced with Luis Manuel & Lupe Fiasco)

== 2019 ==
=== Westside Boogie – Everythings for Sale ===
- 09 ."Rainy Days" (featuring Eminem) (Produced with Streetrunner, Azzouz, Fresh Ayr, Good Lineage Music & Keyel Gitelman)

== 2020 ==
=== J. Cole - TBA ===
- 00 ."Snow on tha Bluff" (Produced with J. Cole and WU10)

=== Eminem – Music to Be Murdered By – Side B (Deluxe edition) ===
- 14 ."Discombobulated" (Produced with Dr. Dre, Mark Baston, Dawaun Parker, Lonestarrmuzik, Trevor Lawrence Jr and franO)

=== Reason (American rapper) - New Beginnings ===
- 06 ."I Can Make It"

== 2022 ==
=== Beyoncé – Renaissance ===
- 1 ."I'm That Girl" (Produced with Beyoncé, Kelman Duran, Jameil Aossey and Stuart White)

=== Royce da 5'9" – The Heaven Experience Vol. 1 ===
- 13 ."Made" (Produced with Shndō)

=== The Game – Drillmatic ===
- 06 ."Outside" (featuring YG) (Produced with Shaun Martin and Nigel Rivers)

== 2023 ==
=== Dreamville – Creed III (soundtrack) ===
- 06 ." "Talk to Me" (featuring Omen, Ari Lennox, and OG DAYV) (Produced with Lonestarrmuzik and Super Miles)

== 2025 ==
=== Lecrae – Reconstruction ===
- 01. "Reconstruction"
