= Have a Nice Day =

Have a nice day is a service industry expression widespread throughout the English-speaking world.

Have a Nice Day may refer to:

== Music ==
- Have a Nice Day (band), Australian power pop band from 1989 to 1994
- Have a Nice Day (Bon Jovi album), 2005
  - "Have a Nice Day" (Bon Jovi song), 2005
- Have a Nice Day (Count Basie album), 1971
- Have a Nice Day (Roxette album), 1999
- "Have a Nice Day" (Stereophonics song), 2001
- Have a Nice Day, a 2022 EP by Lil Xan and Chris Miles
- "Have a Nice Day", a song by the Ramones, from the album ¡Adios Amigos!
- "Have a Nice Day", a song by Roxanne Shante
- "Have a Nice Day", an album and a song by Japanese band World Order

== Other uses ==
- Have a Nice Day (film), a 2017 Chinese animated black comedy film
- Have a Nice Day! (film), a 2023 Mexican comedy-drama film
- Have a Nice Day: A Tale of Blood and Sweatsocks, a 1999 autobiography by Mick Foley
- Have a N.I.C.E. day, a 1997 arcade racing game by Synetic GmbH
- "Have a Nice Day", by George Carlin from A Place for My Stuff
- Have a Nice Day: A Tale of Blood and Sweatsocks
