= Caleb Sean =

American musician

- Born: July 3, 1986 (age 40); Dallas, Texas, U.S.
- Occupations: Record producer, songwriter, singer
- Years active: 2005–present
- Label: Kontrollaz

Caleb Sean McCampbell (born July 3, 1986) is an American singer, songwriter, instrumentalist, and record producer from Dallas, Texas.

== Early life ==
Born into a family of musicians, McCampbell began to sing and play the piano at the age of three. By the age of seven he was involved in piano recitals at his elementary school, and was playing for the children's choir at his home church in Dallas, Texas. His father was a member of the Mac Band, a pop/R&B band that gained popularity with the hit song "Roses are Red" in the early 1990s, and his mother was a vocalist in the band Soul Liberation. McCampbell became familiar with the music industry through his father. McCampbell began singing with his four siblings, and by high school, he was gaining favor through playing different musical gigs in the Dallas and Fort Worth areas.

== Education ==
At an early age, Caleb began his musical training studying under musicians in his family, and continued his musical education through formal instruction beginning at the age of seven. By the age of thirteen, Caleb was a trained vocalist, pianist, and drummer and began to act and model during middle school and high school. While attending Booker T. Washington High School for the Performing and Visual Arts, Caleb was a recipient of the prestigious Downbeat award for “Outstanding Performance” in the categories of “Best Instrumental Soloist” and “Best Original Jazz Composition". After graduating from high school, Caleb continued his education at Cedar Valley College, earning an associate degree in Applied Science for Commercial Music/Performing Musician. After graduation, Caleb was offered a teaching position at Cedar Valley, and became an adjunct professor of Jazz studies there for two years.

== Career ==
McCampbell's first recording gig was in 1989, at age three: he sung in a commercial for Proline's "Just for Me" hair care product. He continued to pursue musical studies throughout elementary, middle school, high school, playing for local churches, weddings, and other musical venues; as a performing musician, he played keyboards for country, blues, jazz, gospel, contemporary, and pop artists.

McCampbell has also appeared on the syndicated ABC television network show Good Morning Texas, and the Trinity Broadcasting Network. He was a co-founder of the Dallas-based jazz fusion band, The Funky Knuckles who he performed and toured with for 7 years. McCampbell has performed and toured with many national and international recording artists such as Marcus Miller, Stanley Clarke, PJ Morton, and Chrisette Michele, and has worked with gospel artists such as Kirk Franklin, Myron Butler, and Tamela Mann. During his work as a music producer, he co-produced fellow Texas native Beyoncé's hit song "Best Thing I Never Had" in 2011. He was credited with frequent collaborator Symbolyc One. In 2011, He officially signed to Symbolyc One‘s production team, Soul Kontrollaz Production and continued to work as a producer alongside him for several years.

McCampbell has received nominations for a Soul Train Award for "Song of the Year" for "Best Thing I Never Had", was a 2011 pick for the "On the Come Up" interview for ASCAP, and received an NAACP Image Award nomination for "Outstanding Song" for Beyonce's "Best Thing I Never Had", and "Outstanding Album" for 4. In 2012, McCampbell also received a Billboard Music Award for Top R&B Album for his production on Beyonce's "4" Album. In June 2012, Caleb won a R&B/Hip Hop Award at the ASCAP Rhythm and Soul Awards for his co-production on Beyonce's "Best Thing I Never Had".

== Discography ==
- "Wish" "Anomaly" Lecrae (vocals) 2014
- "Best Thing I Never Had" 4 Beyonce (co-producer) 2011
- "Murder to Excellence" Watch the Throne Kanye/Jay-Z (add. Keys) 2011
- "Mr. International" Gutter Rainbows Talib Kweli (co-producer) 2010
- "After the Party" Leftback Little Brother 2010
- "Say Wassup" El Che Rhymefest 2010
- "Splitting Image" Splitting Image Kam Moye 2010

== External Reference ==
- Official website
- Official blog
