= Basically =

Basically may refer to:

- "Basically", song by Lil Xan from Total Xanarchy 2018
- "Basically", song by Catfish & the Bottlemen from The Balance 2019
