= 2K8 =

2K8 may refer to:

- the year 2008
- All-Pro Football 2K8, 2007 video game
- College Hoops 2K8, 2007 video game
- Major League Baseball 2K8, 2008 video game
- NBA 2K8, 2007 video game
- NHL 2K8, 2007 video game
