= Chris Miles =

Chris Miles may refer to:

- Chris Miles (musician) (born 1999), American rapper
- Chris Miles (Skins), fictional character in the British teen drama Skins, portrayed by Joe Dempsie
- Chris Miles (politician) (born 1947), Australian politician
