= Betrayed (Lil Xan song) =

Single by Lil Xan

from the EP Toothache and the album Total Xanarchy
- Released: July 20, 2017
- Genre: Hip hop; emo rap
- Length: 3:07
- Label: Columbia; Sony
- Songwriters: Diego Leanos; Adrian Bruesch
- Producer: Bobby Johnson

Lil Xan singles chronology
"Far" (2017)	"Betrayed" (2017)	"Slingshot" (2017)

Music video
- "Betrayed" on YouTube

Remix cover
- Official remix artwork featuring Yo Gotti and Rich the Kid

"Betrayed" is a song recorded by American rapper Lil Xan, released for digital download on July 7, 2017. The single peaked at number 64 on the US Billboard Hot 100.

== Background ==
The song focuses on Lil Xan's personal struggle with the use of Xanax. On the track, Xan talks about past relationships, his struggle with drug abuse, and the adverse effects of Xanax. Lil Xan explained what happened the day that he was inspired to write it, saying that, "I was with my homie Steven and we recorded out of a really ghetto garage. 'Slingshot,' 'Betrayed,' all those songs were recorded in a ghetto, bougie garage. It's just a vibe, you know? The writing is easy there. It just comes naturally. In bigger studios, I can't really catch a vibe like that. I'm not gonna lie, I probably wrote that song in 20 minutes, but I knew when I wrote it this was something different that people haven't heard from me yet. I went in, laid it down and everybody was fucking with it heavy, so it was insane."

Though Leanos still uses the moniker "Lil Xan", he also raises awareness for the problems with the drug, explaining his thoughts in an interview. "People call me a poser all the time. They're like, 'You don't do Xans. You're Lil Xan and you don't do Xans?' I was painfully addicted to Xanax for like two years of my life, so anybody trying to tell me I'm a poser, can shut the fuck up. Because I know what it's like to be addicted to that. And I was lucky enough to get off of that shit. A lot of rappers don't really be talking about not doing drugs. The opposite way. It's refreshing."

== Music video ==
The official music video was released on August 28, 2017, on the Lyrical Lemonade YouTube channel, it was later posted to Xan's YouTube channel via Vevo on May 10, 2018. The music video has over 297 million views on Lyrical Lemonade and has 190 million views on his Vevo/YouTube Channel as of March 2024.

== Remix ==
The song's official remix, released on March 15, 2018, includes guest verses from Yo Gotti and Rich the Kid, and a new verse by Leanos.

== Charts ==
=== Weekly charts ===
Chart (2017–2018)	Peak position
Canada (Canadian Hot 100)	49
Latvia (DigiTop100)	30
Portugal (AFP)	63
Sweden Heatseeker (Sverigetopplistan)	11
US Billboard Hot 100	64
US Hot R&B/Hip-Hop Songs (Billboard)	28
US Rhythmic (Billboard)	22

=== Year-end charts ===
Chart (2018)	Position
US Hot R&B/Hip-Hop Songs (Billboard)	73

== Certifications ==
Region	Certification	Certified units/sales
Australia (ARIA)	Gold	35,000^{‡}
Canada (Music Canada)	2× Platinum	160,000^{‡}
Denmark (IFPI Danmark)	Gold	45,000^{‡}
Mexico (AMPROFON)	Platinum+Gold	90,000^{‡}
New Zealand (RMNZ)	Platinum	30,000^{‡}
Poland (ZPAV)	Gold	25,000^{‡}
United Kingdom (BPI)	Silver	200,000^{‡}
United States (RIAA)	Platinum	1,000,000^{‡}
^{‡} Sales+streaming figures based on certification alone.
