= Yours Truly Forever =

Studio album by Phora
- Released: August 18, 2017
- Recorded: 2016–17
- Genre: Hip hop
- Length: 58:22
- Label: Warner Bros.
- Producer: Eskupe; Anthro Beats; S1; Cardiak; Deadxbeat; Swiff D

Phora chronology
With Love (2016)	Yours Truly Forever (2017)	Love Is Hell (2018)

Singles from Yours Truly Forever
- 1. "Run To" Released: March 31, 2017; 2. "Sinner, Pt. 2" Released: April 28, 2017; 3. "Rider" Released: May 19, 2017; 4. "To The Moon" Released: June 16, 2017; 5. "Numb" Released: July 14, 2017; 6. "Loyalty" Released: August 11, 2017

Yours Truly Forever is the debut studio album by American rapper Phora. It was released on August 18, 2017, through Warner Bros. Records.

External videos
- Phora - Run To [Official Music Video] (March 30, 2017)
- Phora - Sinner Pt. 2 [Official Music Video] (April 27, 2017)
- Phora - Rider [Official Music Video] (May 18, 2017)
- Phora - To The Moon [Official Music Video] (June 15, 2017)
- Phora - Numb [Official Music Video] (July 13, 2017)
- Phora - Loyalty [Official Music Video] (August 10, 2017)
- Phora - God [Official Music Video] (September 14, 2017)

== Background ==
Speaking about the album, Phora said "I feel like all types of music definitely helps people, but music that specifically and especially covers topics such as suicide — and that can be a very touchy topic — but songs that cover suicide, depression, family issues, even abuse, things like that, I feel like that’s very important, most of all to make people not feel like they’re alone." The album contains 16 songs, announced by Phora. Phora stated he wanted the album to connect with the fans and want them to listen to it and be able to relate.

== Track listing ==
No.	Title	Producer	Length
1.	"God"	Eskupe & Anthro Beats	3:33
2.	"R U Still"	Eskupe & Anthro Beats	2:55
3.	"Facts"	Eskupe, Anthro Beats, & S1	3:27
4.	"Way 2 Much"	Eskupe & Anthro Beats	4:08
5.	"Sinner, Pt. 2"	Eskupe & Anthro Beats	4:31
6.	"To the Moon"	Eskupe & Anthro Beats	4:12
7.	"Forever"	Cardiak, Anthro Beats, & Eskupe	3:57
8.	"Numb"	Eskupe & Anthro Beats	2:44
9.	"Rider"	Eskupe, Anthro Beats, & Deadxbeat	3:19
10.	"Loyalty"	Eskupe & Anthro Beats	3:47
11.	"No Looking Back"	Eskupe & Anthro Beats	2:36
12.	"Everybody Knows"	Eskupe & Anthro Beats	4:04
13.	"Run To"	Eskupe & Anthro Beats	2:34
14.	"I Come Apart"	Swiff D	3:12
15.	"In My Eyez"	Eskupe & Anthro Beats	5:12
16.	"When It's Over" (featuring Tiffany Evans)	Eskupe & Anthro Beats	4:11
Total length:			58:22

== Personnel ==
Credits for Yours Truly Forever adapted from Allmusic.

- Marco Archer – Composer
- Tom Bailey – Composer, Vocals (Background)
- Anthro Beats – Mixing, Musician, Producer, Programmer
- Asia Bryant – Composer
- Cardiak – Producer
- Deadxbeat – Producer
- Uforo Ebong – Composer
- Eskupe – Musician, Producer, Programmer
- Tiffany Evans – Composer, Featured Artist
- Adam Feeney – Composer
- Larry Griffin, Jr. – Composer
- Alex Isley – Composer, Vocals (Background)
- George Keane – Composer
- Carl McCormick – Composer
- Phora – Mastering, Mixing, Primary Artist, Recording, Vocals
- Anthony Ruiz – Composer
- S1 – Producer
- Swiff D – Producer
- Adrian Velasquez – Composer
- Toby Woodcock – Composer

== Charts ==
Chart (2017)	Peak position
US Billboard 200	44
