= The Healing (album) =

Studio album by Strange Fruit Project
- Released: July 25, 2006
- Genre: Hip-hop
- Length: 65:52
- Label: Om Records
- Producers: Symbolyc One (S1); Illmind; Chris "Daddy" Dave; Jake One; 9th Wonder; Vitamin D

Strange Fruit Project chronology
From Divine (2004)	The Healing (2006)	The Lost Documents, Volume 1 (2007)

Professional ratings
Review scores
Source	Rating
Allmusic	link
Okayplayer	link
AllHipHop.com	link

The Healing is the third album by underground hip hop group Strange Fruit Project, released July 25, 2006 on Om Records. The album was generally well-received, and drew the group comparisons to underground peers like Little Brother. The release was beloved by underground fans for its "Golden Age" style similar to that of the Native Tongues Posse, with Jazzy production and socially conscious lyrical content. Allmusic gave the album a 3 1/2 Star rating, and stated:

"The Healing is an album of solidly good hip-hop, nothing that really will blow any underground fans away, but absolutely enough to keep them listening."

The album features guest appearances from Little Brother, Erykah Badu, Toby, Thesis, Deloach, Bavu, Darien Brockington, Yahzarah, Verbal Seed, K-Otix, Tahiti, Skotch and Kay, as well as production from group member Symbolyc One, Illmind, Daddy, Jake One, 9th Wonder and Vitamin D. The Healing features the single "Soul Clap" b/w "Special".

== Track listing ==
#	Title	Producer(s)	Performer (s)
1	"Intro"		*Interlude*
2	"Ready Forum"	S1	S1, Myone, Myth
3	"You (The Only Ones)"	Illmind	S1, Myone, Myth
4	"Under Pressure"	S1	S1, Myone, Myth
5	"Good Times"	S1	S1, Myone
6	"Liberation"	Chris "Daddy" Dave	S1, Myone, Myth, Toby
7	"Get Live"	Illmind	S1, Myone, Myth, Erykah Badu
8	"Soul Clap"	Jake One	S1, Myone, Myth
9	"Special"	9th Wonder	S1, Myone, Myth, Thesis
10	"Pinball"	Vitamin D	S1, Myone, Myth
11	"Rise"	Illmind	S1, Myone, Little Brother
12	"Cali Cruisin"	S1	S1, Myone, Deloach, Bavu
13	"Parachutes"	S1	Myone, Myth, Thesis
14	"God Is"	S1	S1, Myone, Darien Brockington, Yahzarah
*	"After the Healing"	S1	S1, Myone, Myth, Verbal Seed, K-Otix, Tahiti, Skotch, Kay

== Album singles ==
Single information
"Soul Clap"
- Released: May 23, 2006
- B-Side: "Special"
