= Total Xanarchy =

Studio album by Lil Xan
- Released: April 6, 2018
- Recorded: 2017
- Genres: Hip hop; trap; mumble rap; emo rap
- Length: 43:23
- Label: Columbia
- Producers: DJ Fu (exec.); Boaz van de Beatz; Bobby Johnson; Danny Wolf; Dilip; Diplo; G Koop; Krs; Lonestarrmuzik; Oshi; Ronny J; S1; Tayo; The Picard Brothers; Young God

Lil Xan chronology
Xanarchy (2017)	Total Xanarchy (2018)	Heartbreak Soldiers (2018)

Singles from Total Xanarchy
- 1. "Slingshot" Released: April 2, 2017; 2. "Betrayed" Released: June 7, 2017; 3. "Far" Released: November 3, 2017; 4. "Wake Up" Released: December 27, 2017; 5. "Color Blind" Released: March 22, 2018

Total Xanarchy is the debut studio album by American rapper Lil Xan. It was released on April 6, 2018, by Columbia Records. The album features guest appearances from Charli XCX, YG, Rae Sremmurd, 2 Chainz, Diplo, Yo Gotti, Rich the Kid, and $teven Cannon. In 2026, the album was removed from streaming services.

It was supported by five singles: "Slingshot", "Betrayed", "Far", "Wake Up" and "Color Blind". Total Xanarchy was panned by both music critics and listeners, with most criticizing the lyrical content and Leanos' overall performance.

== Background ==
The album was originally titled No Love after Xan's single of the same name, but was changed after his management decided not to include the song on the album. It was originally scheduled for a March 17, 2018 release; however, the album was delayed.

On March 2, 2018, during an interview with Ebro Darden during the Ebro in the Morning show, Xan explained the direction of the album's sound and style, by stating,

We really wanted the album to be something else. This album is where I feel like I shine with the whole creativity. It's a lot of stuff people haven't heard. It's a very mature sound. I don't think they're going to expect it.

On March 15, 2018, the album's artwork and release date were revealed through the rapper's Instagram story.

== Singles ==
The album's lead single, "Slingshot", was released on April 2, 2017. The JP-directed music video was originally released on June 21, 2017, however it was re-uploaded on November 22, 2017.

The album's second single, "Betrayed", was released for streaming and digital download on July 20, 2017. The Cole Bennett-directed music video was released on August 28, 2017. The music video has reached over 285 million views on YouTube.

The album's third single, "Far", was released on November 3, 2017. Its music video was released on October 31, 2017.

The album's fourth single, "Wake Up", was released on December 27, 2017. The Cole Bennett-directed music video was released on December 30, 2017.

The album's fifth single, a collaboration with producer Diplo, titled "Color Blind" was released on March 22, 2018. A music video for the song was released on April 10, 2018.

=== Promotional singles ===
The album's lead promotional single, "Betrayed (Remix)" with Yo Gotti and Rich the Kid was released on March 15, 2018.

The album's second promotional single, "The Man" featuring Steven Cannon was released on March 30, 2018, along with the Steve King-directed music video.

== Promotion ==
=== Tour ===
On December 18, 2017, Lil Xan announced an official headlining concert tour to further promote the album titled Total Xanarchy Tour. The tour began on January 25, 2018, in Vancouver, at Venue Nightclub.

Tour dates
Date	City	Venue
United States
January 25, 2018	Vancouver	Venue Nightclub
January 26, 2018	Seattle	Neumos
January 27, 2018	Portland	Hawthorne Theatre
January 31, 2018	Berkeley	Cornerstone
February 1, 2018	Santa Cruz	The Catalyst
February 2, 2018	Fresno	Strummers
February 8, 2018	Mesa	Club Red
February 10, 2018	Albuquerque	Sunshine Building
February 11, 2018	Denver	Cervantes Otherside
February 13, 2018	Lawrence	Granada Theater
February 14, 2018	Des Moines	Wooly's
February 15, 2018	Minneapolis	The Cabooze
February 17, 2018	St. Louis	The Ready Room
February 18, 2018	Omaha	Waiting Room
February 21, 2018	Chicago	Lincoln Hall
February 23, 2018	Cleveland	The Grog Shop
February 24, 2018	Detroit	El Club
February 25, 2018	Toronto	Mod Club Theatre
March 1, 2018	Boston	Middle East Downstairs
March 2, 2018	New York City	Highline Ballroom
March 3, 2018	Philadelphia	Coda
March 4, 2018	Washington	U Street Music Hall
March 6, 2018	Atlanta	Masquerade Hall
March 21, 2018	Los Angeles	The Novo by Microsoft
March 22, 2018	Santa Ana	Observatory
March 23, 2018	Las Vegas	Brooklyn Bowl
March 25, 2018	San Diego	House of Blues
March 30, 2018	Brooklyn	Brooklyn Steel
March 31, 2018	Sayreville	Starland Ballroom

== Critical reception ==
Professional ratings
Aggregate scores
Source	Rating
Metacritic	49/100
Review scores
Source	Rating
The Guardian	2/5 stars
HipHopDX	3.5/5
HotNewHipHop	40%
NME	2/5 stars
Pitchfork	4.7/10
RapReviews	5.5/10
Tiny Mix Tapes	2/5 stars

Total Xanarchy was panned by music critics, with most criticizing the lyrical content and Leanos' overall performance. According to the review aggregator Metacritic, Total Xanarchy received "mixed or average reviews" based on a weighted average score of 49 out of 100 from 7 critic scores.

Ben Beaumont-Thomas from The Guardian gave credit to the tracks containing strong hooks and "fine, gothic production", but criticized Xan for mimicking the technical abilities of XXXTentacion ("Diamonds") and Post Malone ("Far") and lacking in lyricism, saying "I can confidently report that there are no good lyrics on this album." Pitchfork writer Meaghan Garvey said about Lil Xan overall, "On his debut album, the standard-bearer of the sad-rap movement refuses to reveal much in the way of emotion at all, aside from a kind of sullen, conflicted defiance." Writing for Spin, Israel Daramola wrote "Total Xanarchy, at times, can read too much like parody, completely stuffed with miserable songs about breakups and doing drugs and regretting doing drugs because of how much worse they make him feel".

== Track listing ==
Credits adapted from Tidal.

No.	Title	Writer(s)	Producer(s)	Length
1.	"Who I Am"	Diego Leanos; Adrian Bruesch	Bobby Johnson	2:36
2.	"Wake Up"	Leanos; Miguel Curtidor; Dilip Vankatesh	Danny Wolf; Dilip^{[a]}	2:11
3.	"Tick Tock" (featuring 2 Chainz)	Leanos; Tauheed Epps; Ronald Spencer, Jr.	Ronny J	2:35
4.	"Diamonds"	Leanos; Matthew Day	DJ Fu; Postman^{[b]}	2:53
5.	"The Man" (featuring $teven Cannon)	Leanos; Steven Scruggs; Day; Curtidor	DJ Fu; Danny Wolf	2:59
6.	"Saved by the Bell"	Leanos; Larry Griffin, Jr.; Maurice Nichols; Joshua Brennan; Christopher Allen	S1; Lonestarrmuzik; Oshi; Krs.	3:00
7.	"Moonlight" (with Charli XCX)	Leanos; Day; Robert Mandell; Charlotte Aitchison	DJ Fu; G Koop	3:31
8.	"Shine Hard" (featuring Rae Sremmurd)	Leanos; Khalif Brown; Aaquil Brown; Day; Matthaus Fetti	DJ Fu; Tayo	3:57
9.	"Round Here" (featuring YG)	Leanos; Keenon Jackson; Day	DJ Fu; Postman^{[b]}; KanielTheOne^{[b]}	3:11
10.	"Basically"	Leanos; Bruesch	Bobby Johnson	1:46
11.	"Deceived"	Leanos; Bruesch	Bobby Johnson	2:04
12.	"Betrayed"	Leanos; Bruesch	Bobby Johnson	3:08
13.	"Slingshot"	Leanos; Bruesch	Bobby Johnson	1:29
14.	"Far"	Leanos; Day; Jonathan Martinez; Aris Ray	DJ Fu; Young God^{[a]}	2:22
15.	"Color Blind" (Diplo featuring Lil Xan)	Leanos; Maxime Picard; Clément Picard; Joseph Mount; Boaz de Jong; Thomas Wesley Pentz	Diplo; The Picard Brothers; Boaz van de Beatz	2:56
16.	"Betrayed (Remix)" (featuring Yo Gotti and Rich the Kid)	Leanos; Bruesch; Mario Sentell Giden Mims; Dimitri Roger	Bobby Johnson	3:17
Total length:				43:23

Notes

- ^{^[a]} signifies a co-producer
- ^{^[b]} signifies an uncredited co-producer
- "Color Blind" features background vocals from Thomas Azie
- The CD version of the album does not include the songs "Shine Hard" and "Betrayed (Remix)".

== Personnel ==
Credits adapted from Tidal.

Technical

- DJ Fu – recording (track 1, 4, 5, 14), mixing (track 14)
- Steve Hybicki – mixing (tracks 1–11)
- Mauricio "Veto" Iragorri – mastering (tracks 1–14, 16)
- Steven "B" Baughman – mastering (tracks 1–14, 16)
- Kinfolk John – mixing (tracks 2, 12–14, 16), recording (tracks 2, 3, 6–13, 16)
- Nolan Presley – recording (track 3)
- Finis "KY" White – mixing (track 3)
- Ben the Great – mixing (track 14)
- Boaz De Jong – mixing (track 15)
- Mike Bell – mastering (track 15)

== Charts ==
Chart (2018)	Peak position
New Zealand Heatseeker Albums (RMNZ)	6
US Billboard 200	10

== Certifications ==
Region	Certification	Certified units/sales
Canada (Music Canada)	Gold	40,000^{‡}
New Zealand (RMNZ)	Gold	7,500^{‡}
^{‡} Sales+streaming figures based on certification alone.
