= My Life (50 Cent song) =

Single by 50 Cent featuring Eminem and Adam Levine
- Released: November 26, 2012
- Recorded: 2010–2012
- Genre: Hip-hop; East Coast hip-hop; alternative hip-hop; rap rock
- Length: 3:59
- Label: Shady; Aftermath; G-Unit; Interscope; Universal
- Songwriters: Curtis Jackson; Marshall Mathers; Adam Levine; Larry Griffin, Jr.; Herb Rooney
- Producer: Symbolyc One

50 Cent singles chronology
"First Date" (2012)	"My Life" (2012)	"Hate Bein' Sober" (2012)

Eminem singles chronology
"Throw That" (2012)	"My Life" (2012)	"C'mon Let Me Ride" (2012)

Adam Levine singles chronology
"Gotten" (2012)	"My Life" (2012)	"YOLO" (2013)

Music video
- "My Life" on YouTube

"My Life" is a song by American rapper 50 Cent featuring fellow American rapper Eminem and American singer Adam Levine of Maroon 5. It was originally released as the second official single of 50 Cent's scrapped studio album Street King Immortal, but was later removed from the project. The single was produced by American music producer Symbolyc One. The song premiered on American radio station Hot 97, and was made available for digital download on iTunes Store on November 26, 2012.

== Background ==
Although without a confirmed name, the single was announced on September 30, 2012, by 50 Cent himself in an interview with the radio station Channel 4 FM, with host Chris Birks. He stated that he wants to top his most-successful single so far, In da Club, before retiring. 50 Cent also talked about his performance in the Atelier festival in Dubai, which he will be performing songs from his recent projects, such as The Big 10 (2011), The Lost Tape and 5 (Murder by Numbers) (2012).

While confirming the name of the single, 50 Cent has revealed, during an interview while he was in France, that the beat of "My Life" was taken from Dr. Dre's long-awaited (but now cancelled) album Detox. It marks the third song off Detox for his album Street King Immortal, along with "New Day" and "The Psycho".

== Composition ==
The track was produced and written by Symbolyc One, 50 Cent, Eminem, Adam Levine and Herb Rooney. Recorded in 2010, it finds the two rappers spitting about the pressures of fame, in contrast with Eminem and 50's past collaborations, which focused on menacing wordplay. 50 Cent raps about pressures of fame, rifting on his meteoric 2003 rise and former G-Unit artists Game and Young Buck, who he feels took advantage of his creative generosity. He professes "My Life" to be his version of Eminem's Recovery and to be his "comeback hit." Eminem on the other hand raps about his dedication and hard work, and talks about getting revenge, and questions his decision to record Recovery.

=== Sample ===
The song samples Melvin Bliss' Synthetic Substitution in its instrumental, produced by Symbolyc One.

== Reception ==
=== Critical response ===
Jason Lipshutz, from the website of American magazine Billboard, reviewed the song comparing it to Eminem's single "Not Afraid": "'My Life' successfully mirrors Eminem's comeback single 'Not Afraid' by pairing pseudo-introspective lyrics with a chorus full of vague yet decisive statements." He also said: "Maroon 5's Adam Levine provides the pop backbone to a trio of surly verses from 50 Cent and Eminem, with the latter thrusting himself full force into lines". At the end of it, Lipshutz stated that the single "is not nearly as dangerous as its exhilarating early output, but should serve its purpose of giving Street King Immortal its crowning pop single".

== Controversy ==
In the first verse of the song, 50 Cent dissed former members of G-Unit, Game and Young Buck.

I tried to help niggas get on, they turned around and spit
Right in my face, so Game and Buck both can suck a dick
Now when you hear 'em it may sound like they on some other shit
'Cause I'm not writing anymore, they not making hits

— 50 Cent

Game responded to 50 Cent's comments in an interview with American radio station Power 106, saying he might have to make a sequel to "300 Bars and Runnin", finally killing 50 Cent and G-Unit. 50 Cent later said the song was recorded two years ago and he no longer had any ill will towards Game.

== Music video ==
=== Development ===
A video for it was shot with 50 Cent, Eminem and Adam Levine in Corktown Historic District, Detroit and directed by Richard "Rich" Lee, who previously directed videos for Eminem's single "Not Afraid" and Bad Meets Evil's single "Lighters". It features cameo appearances from affiliated boxer Andre Dirrell. On November 26, 2012, the official trailer of the music video was released. The video was premiered on November 27, 2012, on MTV and was added to 50 Cent's channel on VEVO on the same day.

50 Cent and Eminem spoke to MTV News about the video, describing it as a perfect illustration of the difficulties they face day by day.

The video is kind of abstract; it's kind of metaphoric in a sense, like the paranoia of feeling like we're being chased. Whether it's true or not, it's kind of how we feel. It's kind of a metaphor for us running for our lives. Personal lives and from fame, everything that goes with the game.

— Eminem

=== Synopsis and reception ===
The video begins with a helicopter illuminating a building which 50 Cent and Adam Levine are inside. While singing the first chorus, the Maroon 5's front-man is sitting down behind of a wall what the helicopter lights up. 50 Cent raps his first verse, walking inside the building illuminated by the chopper, going to find boxer Andre Dirrell. When he does, both men get into a Chrysler 300 John Varvatos Special Edition. On the second chorus, Adam appears walking inside the building, again, and Eminem makes his first appearance in it walking on a dark road. Eminem appears running from the chopper sometimes in the video. He also appears rapping his verse on a park, under the helicopter's spotlight, as does Adam. During the song's third verse, 50 Cent appears in a Razer's laptop screen, used to locate him. Driving a car, he continues rapping his verse, with Andre Dirrell on its passenger seat, while pursued by the helicopter. The video finishes with all artists stopping from running from the helicopter.

Website Fuse reviewed the video, discussing and explaining certain parts of it.

== Live performances ==
The song was debuted on American reality talent show The Voice, with a performance by 50 Cent and Adam Levine on November 26, 2012. The second live performance of the song took place on December 8, 2012, when 50 Cent performed the song during his fighter Gamboa's entrance to the ring.

== Chart performance ==
The song debuted on the Billboard Hot 100 on the week of December 6, 2012 at #27, selling 140,000 units in its first week. It also debuted on Billboard Hot R&B/Hip-Hop Songs at #6 and at #5 on Rap Songs. It also charted outside the U.S. on Canadian Hot 100 at #14, on Mega Single Top 100 at #89, Schweizer Hitparade at #36, on Ultratip Flanders at #9 and on others charts. The song reached number 9 on the Belgium Ultratip chart, which is the Belgian equivalent of the Billboard bubbling under chart. It has also debuted at #2 on the UK Singles chart after being released in January.

== Track listing ==
Digital download

No.	Title	Writer(s)	Producer(s)	Length
1.	"My Life" (featuring Eminem and Adam Levine)	Curtis Jackson; Marshall Mathers; Adam Levine; Larry Griffin, Jr.; Herb Rooney	Symbolyc One	3:59

CD Single

No.	Title	Writer(s)	Producer(s)	Length
1.	"My Life" (album version) (feat. Eminem and Adam Levine)	Curtis Jackson; Marshall Mathers; Adam Levine; Larry Griffin, Jr.; Herb Rooney	Symbolyc One	3:59
2.	"My Life" (edited version) (feat. Eminem and Adam Levine)	Jackson; Mathers; Levine; Griffin; Rooney	Symbolyc One	3:59
Total length:				7:58

== Credits and personnel ==
- Songwriter – Curtis Jackson, Marshall Mathers, Adam Levine, Larry Griffin, Jr., Herb Rooney
- Production – Symbolyc One

== Charts ==
=== Weekly charts ===
Chart (2012–13)	Peak position
Australia (ARIA)	28
Austria (Ö3 Austria Top 40)	55
Belgium (Ultratip Bubbling Under Flanders)	2
Belgium (Ultratip Bubbling Under Wallonia)	2
Canada Hot 100 (Billboard)	14
France (SNEP)	51
Germany (GfK)	52
Ireland (IRMA)	6
Lebanon (The Official Lebanese Top 20)	8
Netherlands (Single Top 100)	89
New Zealand (Recorded Music NZ)	33
Switzerland (Schweizer Hitparade)	36
Scottish Singles Sales (Official Charts)	2
South Korea (GAON)	4
UK Hip Hop/R&B (Official Charts)	2
UK Singles (Official Charts)	2
US Billboard Hot 100	27
US Pop Airplay (Billboard)	39
US Hot R&B/Hip-Hop Songs (Billboard)	6

== Certifications ==
Region	Certification	Certified units/sales
Australia (ARIA)	Platinum	70,000^{^}
Brazil (Pro-Música Brasil)	Gold	30,000^{‡}
New Zealand (RMNZ)	Gold	7,500^{*}
United Kingdom (BPI)	Silver	200,000^{‡}
United States (RIAA)	Gold	500,000^{‡}
^{*} Sales figures based on certification alone.^{^} Shipments figures based on certification alone.^{‡} Sales+streaming figures based on certification alone.

== Radio and release history ==
Country	Date	Format	Label	Ref
United States	November 26, 2012	Digital download	Shady; Aftermath; Interscope	
France	November 27, 2012	Digital download	Shady; Aftermath; Interscope	
Germany	November 27, 2012	Digital download	Shady; Aftermath; Interscope	
Italy	November 27, 2012	Digital download	Shady; Aftermath; Interscope	
Spain	November 27, 2012	Digital download	Shady; Aftermath; Interscope	
United Kingdom	January 13, 2013	Digital download	Shady; Aftermath; Interscope	
United States	December 4, 2012	Rhythmic contemporary radio	Shady; Aftermath; Interscope	
United States	December 11, 2012	Contemporary hit radio	Shady; Aftermath; Interscope	
