= Phora =

American rapper and singer (born 1994)

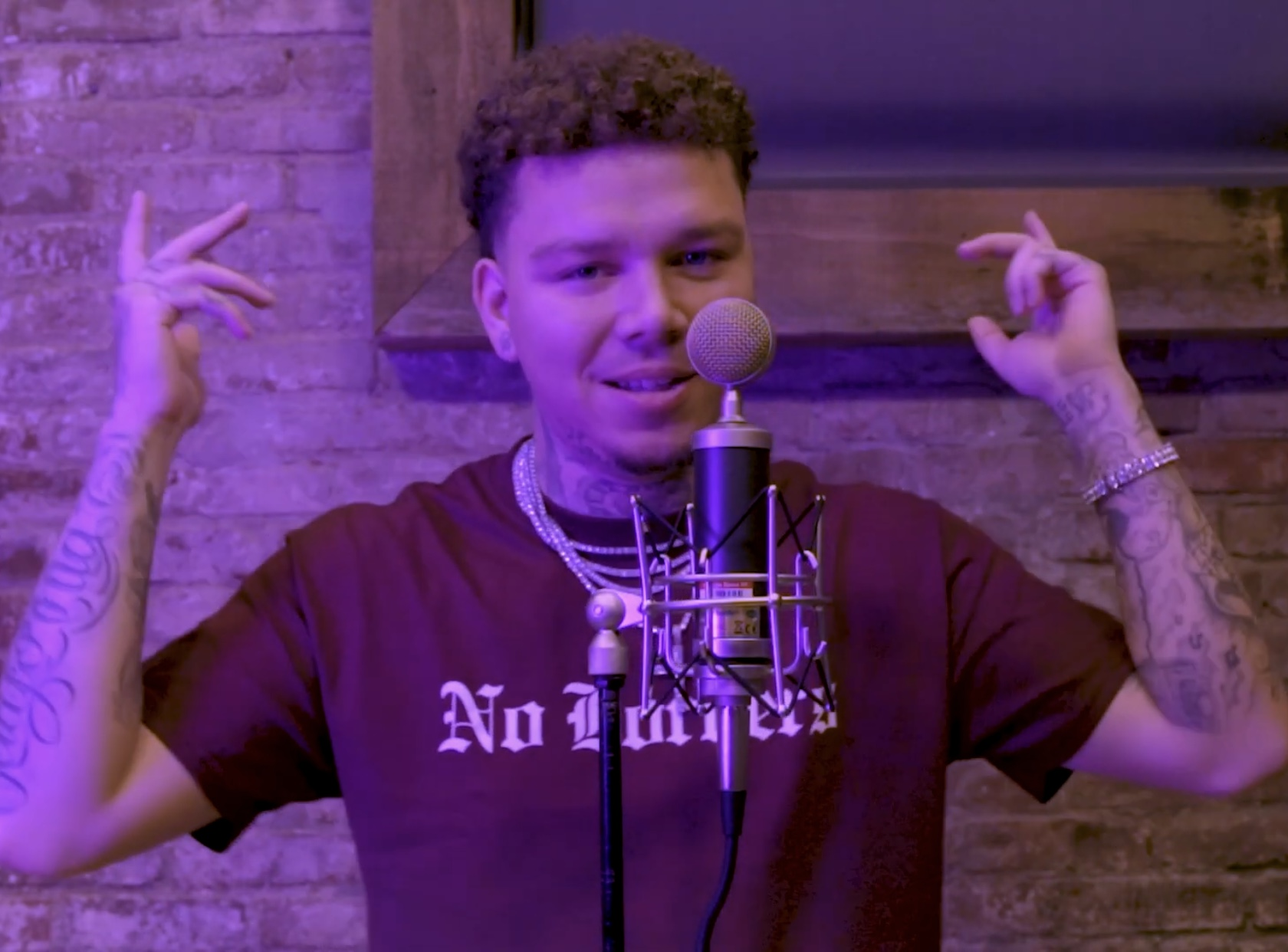
- Phora in 2019

Background information
- Born: Marco Anthony Archer; October 11, 1994 (age 32); Anaheim, California, U.S.
- Genres: Hip-hop, R&B
- Occupations: Rapper; singer; songwriter; record producer; tattoo artist
- Years active: 2010–present
- Labels: Yours Truly; Warner Bros. (2017-2019)
- Website: phoratourone.square.site

Marco Anthony Archer (born October 11, 1994), better known by his stage name Phora, is an American rapper, singer, songwriter, record producer, former tattoo artist and tagger from Anaheim, California. First mixtape "Reflections of the Truth" released In 2010. In 2011, he founded his own record label, Yours Truly. His debut studio album, Yours Truly Forever (2017), peaked at number 44 on the Billboard 200 chart.

== Early life ==
Marco Archer was born in Anaheim, California. Growing up, both him and his younger and only sister, their parents were separated. He had a step father growing up that he explained was abusive. While father was constantly in and out of prison leaving him with a tough upbringing, Before his career in music, his first job was at a dollar tree, He passion for art and started when he started drawing his favorite anime characters, he would expand into tagging joining a crew. When he was 13 while tagging he almost used the name "Phame" but didn't like it and eventually landed on his now know stage name "Phora". While tagging he ended up getting in trouble with the law getting sent to juvie multiple times. He decided to use his talents of drawing to later become a tattoo artist which proved to be relatively lucrative and aided in the funding of his rap career and support his family. In 2011, Marco was nearly stabbed to death in Anaheim, CA just outside of Trident Learning Center, now known as Gilbert High.

He has survived a stabbing at 15 and two shootings.

On August 25, 2015, while he was driving on the 210 freeway in Pasadena around 2 a.m., a gray Infiniti sedan pulled up alongside Archer, who was driving home with his then girlfriend, Destiny. Three bullets from a .45 caliber pistol were fired into his back and neck, narrowly missing his vertebra. The crime remains unsolved.

== Career ==
Phora would record his first rap at 6, but didn't have his first official song until 2009 with his father who goes by the name P1caso, On August 24th, he would release his first ever project with his mixtape "Reflections Of The Truth" following it up next year with the sequel "Reflections Of The Truth Vol 2"

In February 2017, Phora announced signed a major label deal with Warner Bros. Records. So far, Phora has written and released Twenty Four projects, majority of which relates to his past struggles with depression, heartbreak, and growing up in Anaheim, California . These include Reflections of the Truth Vol 1-3, Yours Truly, Therapy, Proverbs 18:21, Still a Kid, One Life to Live, Sincerely Yours, Nights Like These, Angels with Broken Wings, Bury Me With Dead Roses, With Love 1-3, Heartbreak Hotel 1-2, The Butterfly Effect, For those who feel nothing, Growing Pains, Lucky Me, 777 MIXTAPE, and his debut studio album Yours Truly Forever which peak at 44 on the Billboard 200.

In 2018, he released a follow-up to his debut album, titled Love Is Hell which peaked at 87 and had features such as Trippie Redd, G-Eazy, Tory Lanez, 6lack and more. In July 2019, Phora left his record deal with Warner Bros. Records and subsequently released his new album with Emmanuel Mendoza Herrero entitled Bury Me with Dead Roses. In 2020, he released his fourth studio album, With Love 2 which peaked at 160 and featured Danileigh, Toosii, Ty Dollar $ign, Jhené Aiko, Kehlani, and Tyla Yaweh. In February 2021, he released Heartbreak Hotel. In December 2022 he released his fifth studio album The Butterfly Effect. On September 14, 2023, he released his sixth studio album and first R&B album, Lucky Me. He then released Heartbreak Hotel 2, which would be his last Album for 2 years ending his 14 year streak of an Album every year. On November 5th he would release With Love 3 for his mixtape With Love, 10 year anniversary

In August 2025, Phora's company, Phora LLC, filed for Chapter 11 bankruptcy protection to restructure debt that it owes to Warner Records, amongst several other creditors.

== Musical style ==
Growing up, Archer was strongly influenced by graffiti to make music and influenced by his father to pursue music.

In his song "The World" from his album Angels with Broken Wings (2015), he calls J. Cole, Hopsin, and Logic the only rappers he likes.

His musical style can also be defined by his producer Anthro Beats.

== Discography ==
=== Studio albums ===
List of studio albums, with selected details
Title	Album details	Peak chart positions		
Title	Album details	US	US R&B/HH	US Rap
Yours Truly Forever	Released: August 18, 2017; Label: Warner Bros.; Format: Digital download, Streaming, CD	44	29	25
Love Is Hell	Released: October 5, 2018; Label: Warner Bros.; Format: Digital download, Streaming	87	44	—
Bury Me with Dead Roses	Released: July 26, 2019; Label: Phora LLC; Format: Digital download, Streaming	—	—	—
With Love 2	Released: November 6, 2020; Label: Phora LLC; Format: Digital download, Streaming	160	—	—
Heartbreak Hotel	Released: February 12, 2021; Label: Phora LLC; Format: Digital download, Streaming	—	—	—
The Butterfly Effect	Released: December 2, 2022; Label: Phora LLC; Format: Digital download, Streaming	—	—	—
Lucky Me	Released: September 14, 2023; Label: Phora LLC; Format: Digital download, Streaming	—	—	—
Heartbreak Hotel 2	Released: April 4, 2024; Label: Phora LLC; Format: Digital download, Streaming	—	—	—
With Love 3	Released: November 5, 2026; Label: Phora LLC; Format: Digital download, Streaming, CD	—	—	—

=== Mixtapes ===
List of mixtapes, with selected details
Title	Album details	Peak chart positions
Title	Album details	US Rap
Reflections of the Truth	Released: August 24, 2010; Label: Street Smart; Format: Digital download, CD	—
Reflections of the Truth Vol 2	Released: August 31, 2011; Label: Yours Truly; Format: Digital download, CD	—
Reflections of the Truth Vol 3	Released: October 24, 2011; Label: Yours Truly; Format: Digital download, CD	—
Yours Truly	Released: February 26, 2012; Label: Yours Truly; Format: Digital download, CD	—
Therapy	Released: April 23, 2012; Label: Yours Truly; Format: Digital download, CD	—
Proverbs 18:21	Released: August 12, 2012; Label: Yours Truly; Format: Digital download, CD	—
Still a Kid	Released: November 18, 2012; Label: Yours Truly; Format: Digital download, Streaming, CD	—
Still a Kid (Deluxe)	Released: June 3, 2013; Label: Yours Truly; Format: Digital download, Streaming, CD	—
One Life to Live	Released: July 1, 2013; Label: Yours Truly; Format: Digital download, Streaming, CD	—
Sincerely Yours	Released: May 18, 2014; Label: Yours Truly; Format: Digital download, Streaming, CD	—
Angels with Broken Wings	Released: October 11, 2015; Label: Yours Truly; Format: Digital download, Streaming, CD	14
With Love	Released: October 11, 2016; Label: Yours Truly; Format: Digital download, Streaming, CD	5
777 Mixtape	Released: March 15, 2026; Label: Phora LLC; Format: CD	_

=== EPs ===
List of EPs, with selected details
Title	EP details
Nights Like These	Released: December 10, 2014; Label: Yours Truly; Format: Digital download, Streaming, CD
For Those Who Feel Nothing	Released: April 29, 2022; Label: Phora LLC; Format: Digital download, Streaming,
Growing Pains	Released: June 8, 2023; Label: Phora LLC; Format: Digital download, Streaming,

=== Singles ===
List of singles as a lead artist
Title	Year	Certifications	Album
"Open Letter"	2016		Non-album single
"To the Moon"	2017	* RIAA: Gold	Yours Truly Forever
"Stars in the Sky" (featuring Jhene Aiko)	2020		With Love 2
"Cupids Curse" (featuring Kehlani)	2020		With Love 2
"Traumatized" (featuring Toosii)	2020		With Love 2
"Loaded Gun"	2021		Heartbreak Hotel

=== Guest appearances ===
List of non-single guest appearances, with other performing artists, showing year released and album name
Title	Year	Other artist(s)	Album
"If Tomorrow Never Comes"	2014	Anthro Beats, Eskupe	If Tomorrow Never Comes
"They Don't Understand"	2015	Cristiles	—N/a
"Guardian Angel"	2016	Anthro Beats	—N/a
"Interlude"	2018	Mozzy, Terrace Martin	Spiritual Conversations
"Outta Time"	2019	Kruk One	—N/a

== Filmography ==
=== Music videos ===
List of music videos, with directors, showing year released
Title	Year	Director(s)
"Sick With It" (featuring P1CASO)	2011	—N/a
"Taggerstyle Pt. 2" (featuring Maiselph)	2011	Street-Smart.net
"Inner City Kids"	2011	Presh
"Payback" (featuring Hands)	2011	—N/a
"Past Is Forever"	2012	Street-Smart.net
"Think Again" (featuring Good Grades)	2012	Vintage FAP
"Lately"	2012	Street-Smart.net
"The Experience"	2012	—N/a
"Nothing but Love"	2012	Torey Ryba
"Real?"	2013	Solidvisions
"Despair"	2013	Nelson Moran
"As the Wind Blows"	2013	Phora & Destiny Blakely
"90's Baby" (featuring InDJnous)	2013	Phora & Destiny Blakely
"Hope"	2013	Phora
"Pain"	2013	Phora
"Lost Souls"	2013	Phora
"The Old Days"	2013	Phora
"What It's Like"	2013	Phora
"No Other Way"	2013	Phora
"Donuts"	2013	—N/a
"As Time Goes By"	2013	Phora
"My Story"	2013	Reuben Colazo
"Catharsis"	2014	—N/a
"Tell Me"	2014	Phora & Nelson Moran
"The Root of All Evil"	2014	Phora
"Reflections"	2014	George Orozco
"Girl"	2014	Phora
"Night Owls"	2014	Phora
"Stay True"	2014	George Orozco
"Roll Witchu" (featuring Dizzy Wright)	2014	George Orozco
"Before Its Over Pt. 2"	2015	Phora
"Deeper Than Blood"	2015	George Orozco
"What If"	2015	George Orozco
"Gods Plan"	2015	George Orozco
"The Beauty Inside"	2015	George Orozco
"The One for You"	2015	George Orozco
"Open Letter"	2016	George Orozco
"I Think I Love You"	2016	George Orozco
"Sinner"	2016	George Orozco
"Like Me"	2016	George Orozco
"Weaknesses"	2016	George Orozco
"Palm Trees"	2016	George Orozco
"2Faces"	2016	George Orozco
"Move Too Fast"	2016	George Orozco
"Fake Smiles"	2016	George Orozco
"The Cold"	2016	George Orozco
"Slow Down"	2017	George Orozco
"Run To"	2017	George Orozco
"Faithful"	2017	George Orozco
"Sinner Pt. 2"	2017	George Orozco
"Rider"	2017	George Orozco
"To the Moon"	2017	George Orozco
"Numb"	2017	George Orozco
"Snakes"	2017	George Orozco
"Loyalty"	2017	George Orozco
"God"	2017	George Orozco
"Boss Up"	2018	George Orozco & 6th Element
"Holding On"	2018	George Orozco & 6th Element
"Come Thru"	2018	George Orozco & 6th Element
"Stuck in My Ways"	2018	George Orozco & 6th Element
"Feel"	2018	George Orozco & 6th Element
"I Still Love You"	2019	Brian Robles (6th Element)
"Don't Change"	2019	Brian Robles (6th Element)
"Find a way"	2019	Brian Robles (6th Element)
