= Best Thing I Never Had =

2011 single by Beyoncé

Single by Beyoncé

from the album 4
- Released: June 1, 2011
- Recorded: 2011
- Studio: MSR; KMA Music (New York City)
- Genre: Pop; R&B
- Length: 4:13
- Label: Columbia
- Songwriters: Beyoncé Knowles; Antonio Dixon; Kenneth Edmonds; Larry Griffin, Jr.; Caleb McCampbell; Patrick Smith; Shea Taylor
- Producers: Knowles; Babyface; Symbolyc One; Dixon; Caleb Sean; Taylor

Beyoncé singles chronology
"Run the World (Girls)" (2011)	"Best Thing I Never Had" (2011)	"Lift Off" (2011)

Music video
- "Best Thing I Never Had" on YouTube

"Best Thing I Never Had" is a song by American singer Beyoncé from her fourth studio album, 4 (2011). It was released by Columbia Records on June 1, 2011, as the second single from the album. The song was composed by Patrick "J. Que" Smith, Kenneth "Babyface" Edmonds, Symbolyc One, Caleb Sean McCampbell, Antonio Dixon, Beyoncé, and Shea Taylor. The song was originally not written as a ballad, but was inspired by the drumming on Doug E. Fresh's 1985 single "The Show". Beyoncé said that both men and women should be able to relate to the song.

A pop and R&B ballad, the subjects of "Best Thing I Never Had" are revenge and karma. Not wanting to feel broken-hearted, the female protagonist sings that she feels happy to have left her lover, who did not recognize the potential for a happy life with her. Some critics viewed it as a sequel to Beyoncé's 2006 single "Irreplaceable" as the two songs are thematically similar. However, some lyrics, including "showed your ass" and "sucks to be you right now", were criticized. The ballad was also likened to Vanessa Carlton's single "A Thousand Miles" (2002).

"Best Thing I Never Had" peaked at number 16 on the US Billboard Hot 100 chart and at number four on the US Hot R&B/Hip-Hop Songs chart. It rose to number three on the UK Singles Chart and number two on the Irish Singles Chart among others. The song reached number one in Croatia as well as the South Korea Gaon International Chart, the UK R&B Chart, and the US Hot Dance Club Play chart. It was certified quadruple platinum by the Australian Recording Industry Association (ARIA) and triple platinum by the Recording Industry Association of America (RIAA).

The accompanying music video for "Best Thing I Never Had" was directed by Diane Martel. It shows Beyoncé getting ready for her wedding while she recalls her ex-lover, who never gave her the attention she deserved. "Best Thing I Never Had" was promoted with several live performances by Beyoncé, notably at the 2011 Glastonbury Festival and on the televised ABC show The View. The song was also included on the set list for her concert 4 Intimate Nights with Beyoncé and other shows.

== Writing and recording ==
Beyoncé and Patrick "J. Que" Smith wrote "Best Thing I Never Had" in collaboration with its producers Kenneth "Babyface" Edmonds, Symbolyc One, Antonio Dixon, Shea Taylor, and Caleb Sean. According to Smith, "Best Thing I Never Had" is a ballad but was not originally written so; early demos sounded like late 1980s hip hop material. The main inspiration for the song was the drumming of Doug E. Fresh's song "The Show" (1985). Smith told Gyant of Black Entertainment Television (BET) that he was initially intimidated at the prospect of working with Beyoncé. He was in Los Angeles when Tony Dixon telephoned him to say he and Edmonds were going to write some songs with Beyoncé. Smith was asked to join them in the studio and the trio wrote part of "Best Thing I Never Had". After a few days, Dixon and Smith went to the studio again and completed the writing. The song was modified by Edmonds after hearing a demo; he tweaked the lyrics and added a few more melodies.

Beyoncé's vocals were recorded at the KMA Studio in New York City. When the trio played Beyoncé the demo of "Best Thing I Never Had", she immediately approved it after making slight modifications. Smith says that Beyoncé was literally jumping up and down after hearing the demo. One hour later Beyoncé recorded "Best Thing I Never Had" and two other songs. Smith recalled that Beyoncé focused solely on the recording, ignoring hunger as she worked into the night. Beyoncé has stated that every man and woman can relate to the song's subject matter because at one point, almost everyone ends a relationship because of lack of commitment by his or her partner.

== Artwork and release ==
A private listening party for Beyoncé's fourth studio album, 4, was held on May 12, 2011. Beyoncé offered a select group of fans a preview of five songs from 4, including "Best Thing I Never Had". On May 20, 2011, a song called "End of Time", featuring Beyoncé professing everlasting love, was leaked online, watermarked with the tag "internal use only". Several websites, including MTV News reported that it might be released as the second single from 4. However, these speculations were soon overshadowed by the release of "1+1" on May 25, 2011, a promotional single in the United States exclusively. Nevertheless, Columbia Records reported that "1+1" would not be released for airplay and that "Best Thing I Never Had" was favored as the second single from 4, following "Run the World (Girls)".

On May 27, 2011, Pittsburgh radio station 96.1 Kiss FM received an email from Beyoncé's management, informing them that "Best Thing I Never Had" would premiere on radio on June 1, 2011. The single debuted on US radio at 8 a.m. (EST) that day. Its cover artwork was also unveiled on June 1, 2011, on Beyoncé's official website. It was photographed by Ellen von Unwerth and shows Beyoncé posing in a bathroom in front of a mirror while wearing a tight-fitting dress designed by Lleah Rae. She holds a tube of red lipstick, which has been used to write "King B" on the mirror. The song was digitally released in the United States on June 1, and in Europe on June 9. "Best Thing I Never Had" was released as a digital download in the UK on July 3, 2011, and as a CD single in Germany on July 29. A digital EP containing four remixes of the song was released in Australia and the United Kingdom on September 2.

== Composition and lyrical interpretation ==
"Best Thing I Never Had"
A 25-second sample of second verse of "Best Thing I Never Had"; a female empowering ballad, which has "a sort of wit and openness". Backed by a string undercurrent, big bass drums, and a cascading piano work, Knowles adopts occasionally aggressive vocals as she sings with a "compelling mix of wounded pride and genuine heartbreak".

"Best Thing I Never Had" is a midtempo pop and R&B power ballad, which incorporates elements of gospel music. The song is set in common time with a moderate tempo of 100 beats per minute, and is written in the key of G♭ major. The introduction follows the chord progression of G♭–C♭–E♭m–D♭, while the verses follow G♭_{sus4}–G♭–E♭m–D♭_{6}–G♭_{sus4}–G♭. Beyoncé's voice spans from the low note of E♭_{3} to the high note of G♭_{5}. Layered female vocals provide a backing to Beyoncé's occasionally aggressive vocals. The instrumentation includes a piano, stadium-sized bass drums, and strings. "Best Thing I Never Had" is thematically a kiss-off song; it is in this respect similar to Beyoncé's own songs "Irreplaceable" (2006) and "If I Were a Boy" (2008).

Kyle Anderson of Entertainment Weekly wrote that elements of the ballad have emanated from Celine Dion's "That’s The Way It Is" (1999), and Bruce Hornsby's "The Way It Is" (1986). Caryn Ganz of Yahoo! Music wrote that "Best Thing I Never Had" resembles Vanessa Carlton's 2002 song "A Thousand Miles" paired with Ryan Tedder's thumping beat. Ryan Dombal of Pitchfork Media also noted that the song wouldn't sound "out-of-place" on a Vanessa Carlton album. Priya Elan of NME noted that the ballad is reminiscent of Beyoncé's own 2008 songs "Halo" and "Scared Of Lonely", owing to its cascading piano work and drum beat. James Dinh of MTV News wrote that "Best Thing I Never Had" sounds like a song from a Broadway musical; he attributed the comparison to Beyoncé's collaboration with the band from Fela! to gain inspiration from the play's subject, Nigerian musician and composer Fela Kuti.

The song's lyrics are about the breakdown of a relationship between Beyoncé and her lover, a situation that suits both of them. They also touch on revenge and karma, particularly the opening line, "What goes around comes back around", the lines "Best thing I never had", "Best thing you never had", and the closing line, "Sucks to be you right now". Happy to have avoided heartbreak, Beyoncé continues to sing about her ex-lover, who did not recognize the possibility of a happy relationship with Beyoncé until the relationship broke down. Beyoncé no longer desires her lover after discovering his deceit; as shown in the pre-chorus and chorus lines, "When I think of the time that I almost loved you / You showed your ass and I saw the real you / Thank God you blew it, I thank God I dodged a bullet / I’m so over you, so baby good looking out / I wanted you bad / I’m so through with that / Because honestly / You turned out to be the best thing I never had / And will always be the best thing you never had."

In the second verse, Beyoncé continues to dismiss her former lover as she sings, "So sad, you're hurt / boo hoo ...", over a tinkling piano riff and bass drums. She then chants the ascendant chorus, which this time features soaring strings and an uplifting aggressive piano accompaniment. Nadine Cheung of AOL Radio noted that though Beyoncé rips through the verses, she sings the chorus and bridge with restraint; on the latter, she affirms that she has moved on in life. The song ends as Beyoncé repeatedly sings, "What goes around comes back around / I bet it sucks to be you right now".

== Critical reception ==
"Best Thing I Never Had" received average to favorable reviews from music critics. Gerrick D. Kennedy of the Los Angeles Times noted similarities between "Best Thing I Never Had" and Beyoncé's previous singles including "Irreplaceable" and "If I Were a Boy", and concluded that Beyoncé "certainly knows how to dump a man in style". Matthew Perpetua of Rolling Stone wrote that "Best Thing I Never Had" could be "Irreplaceable Part Two" and noted that Beyoncé's vocal performance brings depth to the song. Rich Juzwiak of The Village Voice wrote that the song is not as iconic as its reference point "Irreplaceable", but "nor is it as shady". He commended the optimism in the song's lyrics. Consequence of Sound writer Chris Coplan commented that the ballad is a powerful moment of self-realization, which is enhanced by Beyoncé's vocal performance "as [a] wounded bird turned resilient lioness". Choosing "Best Thing I Never Had" as the highlight of 4, Andy Kellman of Allmusic described it as "a bombastic kiss-off saved by Beyoncé's ability to plow through it". Kyle Anderson of Entertainment Weekly noted the moderate chart performance of "Run the World (Girls)", and wrote:

"Best Thing I Never Had" finds Beyoncé mining the same kind of girl-power imagery as she did on 'Run the World (Girls)'. But there is something more direct and honest about the lyrics on the new single (perhaps it's the instant greatness of the line, 'When I think of the time I almost loved you / You showed your ass and I saw the real you'). 'Best Thing I Never Had' feels like the kind of crossover hit that will help 4 join the rest of Beyoncé's discography in multiplatinum land.

Jessica Sinclair of Long Island Press noted that "Best Thing I Never Had" is different from "Run the World (Girls)" and that it shows a side of Beyoncé that listeners rarely see. Similarly, Joanne Dorken of MTV UK wrote that the song reveals "a more ferocious side to Beyoncé with its faster pace and aggressive piano backing". Robert Copsey of Digital Spy commented that the "['Best Thing I Never Had'] is a classic Beyoncé track waiting to happen". Chad Grischow of IGN wrote that "the lush backing music and [the] soaring vocals" on the song sound suitable for an updated take on the Waiting To Exhale soundtrack album as Beyoncé is ecstatic that she ended a poor relationship before it was too late. Jon Caramainca of The New York Times commented that the "Best Thing I Never Had" has "optimistic, coffee-commercial" pianos, which place Beyoncé directly in Lilith Fair territory. James Montgomery of MTV News wrote that it is one of the best ballads on the album 4. James Dinh of the same publication added that the song has a radio-friendly appeal and a catchy chorus. Similarly, Adam Markovitz of Entertainment Weekly and Joey Guerra of the Houston Chronicle praised the song's radio nature, with the latter calling it "a return to form" with a "regal sound of a radio smash". Jim Farber of Daily News wrote that the melodies and the clever lyrics of "Best Thing I Never Had" are likely to inspire significant airplay. Ricky Schweitzer of One Thirty BPM commented that even though the ballad sounds like a place-filler on 4, it remains largely superior "to the majority of the trash being churned out by Beyoncé’s peers".

"Best Thing I Never Had" also received a few mixed and negative reviews. Amos Barshad of New York magazine wrote that the ballad borrows more heavily from Beyoncé's own 2006 single "Irreplaceable", and that "[this] can't be a bad thing". However, he noted that "this time in language ('Sucks to be you right now') agreeable to a nation of tweens and in a manner agreeable to anyone who likes yelping along in unison to ascendant pop choruses." David Amidon of PopMatters wrote that lines like "showed your ass" and "it must suck to be you" exemplify lame lyrics. He concluded that, "[listeners] are wondering how such lame lyrics could be sung with such earnestness." Alexis Petridis of The Guardian wrote that the most interesting thing about "Best Thing I Never Had" is the curious image evoked by the chorus' lyric, noting that everything seemed fine until "the protagonist's former amorata 'showed your ass'". Music Week's Ben Cardew commented that its 1980s sound is "not a highlight". A negative review came from Al Shipley of The Village Voice who wrote that "Best Thing I Never Had" and "Party" were "among the album's worst and most unrepresentative songs".

=== Recognition ===
"Best Thing I Never Had" received a nomination for Record of the Year at the 2011 Soul Train Music Awards. At the 43rd NAACP Image Award presented on February 17, 2012, "Best Thing I Never Had" received a nomination in the category for Outstanding Song. At the 2012 ASCAP Rhythm & Soul Awards, "Best Thing I Never Had" won in the category for Award-Winning R&B/Hip-Hop Songs. The Guardian's critic Dan Hancox placed the song at number four on his list of the 10 best songs of 2011. On The Village Voice's 2011 year-end Pazz & Jop singles list, "Best Thing I Never Had" was ranked at number 604.

== Chart performance ==
For the chart issue dated June 18, 2011, "Best Thing I Never Had" debuted at number 84 on the US Billboard Hot 100 chart. The following week, the song climbed to number 75; the week her album 4 was released, it further moved from number 58 to number 29 on the Hot 100 chart dated July 16, 2011. Four weeks later, the ballad entered the top 20, moving from number 25 to number 19 on the Hot 100 chart. For the week ending August 13, 2011, "Best Thing I Never Had" peaked at number 16 on the Hot 100 chart. It was last seen on the chart issue dated October 29, 2011, at number 67, having spent 19 consecutive weeks on it. "Best Thing I Never Had" debuted at number 53 on the US Hot R&B/Hip-Hop Songs chart issue dated June 18, 2011, where it was the highest debut that week. For the week ending September 24, 2011, the song reached number one on the Nielsen Broadcast Data Systems (BDS) urban airplay chart with 3765 spins, which were heard by 22.033 million listeners. It stayed at number one for one additional week. "Best Thing I Never Had" eventually peaked at number four on the Hot R&B/Hip-Hop Songs chart. The song reached number one on the US Hot Dance Club Songs chart, on the issue dated September 10, 2011. As of October 2012, it has sold over 1 million paid digital downloads in the US.

For the week ending June 18, 2011, "Best Thing I Never Had" debuted at number one on the South Korea Gaon International Chart with digital sales of 85,742 copies. The following week, it remained at number one and sold twice as many copies, amassing 174,773 digital sales. As of October 2012, the single has sold over 1.1 million copies in South Korea.

On June 13, 2011, the ballad debuted at number 29 on the Australian ARIA Singles Chart. "Best Thing I Never Had" kept fluctuating on the chart for the next five weeks until it entered the top 20 on July 25, 2011, at number 18. On August 1, 2011, the song peaked at number 17 on the singles chart and at number six on ARIA's urban singles chart. It was certified platinum by the Australian Recording Industry Association (ARIA), denoting shipment 70,000 copies. "Best Thing I Never Had" debuted on the New Zealand Singles Chart on June 26, 2011. On its fifth week on the chart, it peaked at number five. On August 14, 2011, the song was certified gold by the Recording Industry Association of New Zealand (RIANZ), denoting shipment 7,500 copies.

Before the song's official release in the United Kingdom, "Best Thing I Never Had" debuted at number three on the UK Singles Chart and number two on the UK R&B Chart on July 4, 2011, selling 51,365 copies that week. Music Week's Alan Jones attributed the high sales to Beyoncé's performance at the 2011 Glastonbury Festival. It became Beyoncé's sixteenth top 10 UK single as a solo artist, and her highest charting UK single since "If I Were a Boy" peaked at number one in November 2008. On July 17, 2011, "Best Thing I Never Had" reached number one on the UK R&B Chart, and the UK Airplay Chart the following week, amassing 71.58 million listener impressions. It became Beyoncé's fourth single as a solo artist, and seventh, including her singles with Destiny's Child, to reach number one on that chart The song was last seen in the top 100 of the UK Singles Chart on January 8, 2012, having spent 28 weeks on the chart. "Best Thing I Never Had" debuted at number 35 in the Irish Singles Chart on June 16, 2011. Although the song fell to number 42 the following week, it began to continually climb the chart as from June 30, 2011, and entered the top 20 four weeks later. On July 14, 2011, "Best Thing I Never Had" entered the top 10 at number six, and peaked at number two the following week, becoming Beyoncé's fourteenth single as a solo artist to peak inside the top 10 on the Irish Singles Chart.

== Music video ==
=== Background and concept ===
"I wanted to do something a little brighter and so I thought it could be interesting to reenact a prom. I never got to go to my prom. I remember that awkward stage and usually you're attracted to the person that is not really thinking about you. The guy is kinda flirting with everybody else and you're kinda just sitting there shy and uncomfortable. I was that way when I was a teenager. [...] I never went to my prom, so now I get to have a prom, but my prom sucks."

— Knowles talking about the concept of the video.

The music video for "Best Thing I Never Had" was directed by Diane Martel, and filmed in Westchester County on June 15, 2011, and in Fort Greene, Brooklyn, on June 16, 2011. On June 20, 2011, it was reported that Beyoncé would not play the prom queen in the video. Beyoncé said that not being prom queen in the video reminded her of how she never wore the coveted tiara at her own high school dance. She added that she felt strange because her father, Mathew Knowles, did not escort her down the aisle in the wedding scene, as he had when she married Jay-Z in April 2008. The wedding scene was filmed at Sleepy Hollow Country Club on June 15, 2011. In July 2011, Beyoncé was interviewed by Access Hollywood, where she said of the video's set:

It was a little strange. And definitely when I walked down the aisle I was like, 'This is kind of creepy — there’s some other man standing there!' It was really beautiful. People were all really excited like it was really my wedding. My mother was even like, 'Aww', and I was like, 'Mom, it's a video. This is not my dress. This is not the real wedding.' But I think it’s just one of those moments that every woman kind of fantasizes and relives.

Beyoncé said that the wedding dress she wears in the video was a Baracci one, which she saw in a shop window a year ago when she was at the 52nd Grammy Awards. She added that the dress was "just like a beautiful fantasy, so we called and they still had the dress". Beyoncé also wears a tiara designed by Lorraine Schwartz, who converted it from a necklace. Beyoncé said that the wedding outfit made her feel "like royalty ... like a queen". She added that the music video wedding was more chaotic than her real wedding in 2008, "This may have been a little more crazy, actually. I had to sing at the same time!" The ivory draped V-neck gown which Beyoncé wears in the video was designed by the Chinese-American fashion designer Vera Wang. The video premiered online at 8 pm (EST) on July 7, 2011. It was available for digital download on July 9, 2011.

=== Synopsis ===
The music video begins with Beyoncé preparing herself for her wedding ceremony. She is in her boudoir wearing a lacy corset and a lingerie combo with garters. As the song begins, Beyoncé looks towards the camera, addressing the viewer while affirming the subject of the song that she was the best he ever had. The video moves from Beyoncé playing with a tiara, a veil and tulle netting on a bed, to various stages of getting dressed. Between scenes, flash back scenes of Beyoncé in high school are shown. Beyoncé is seen with a high school boyfriend at their senior-prom night on May 16, 1998. As Beyoncé and her boyfriend dance, he becomes interested in another girl, leaving Beyoncé alone on the dance floor. The video then returns to the present, with Beyoncé in her final preparations before her marriage. She is shown wearing a white gown and singing at sunset atop a grassy hill, followed by a scene of her walking down the aisle and exchanging vows. Her former lover is shown at the prom, deep in thought, with his prom king crown askew on his head. Beyoncé and her new husband are seen celebrating at a happy and well-attended reception. The groom removes the bride's garter with his teeth and they start dancing with their younger family members. The final scene features Beyoncé looking into the camera looking happy and satisfied. She walks off confidently to rejoin her wedding party and new husband, and then the screen fades to black.

=== Reception ===
Entertainment Weekly's Adam B. Vary wrote that Beyoncé was "at her peak — in voice, in looks, in taste in opulent wedding gowns". A Rolling Stone's critic commented Beyoncé was looking stunning in a bridal suite, adding that the most disarming thing about the clip is that she sings directly to the camera. The review concludes that, "the video hits all of its marks perfectly, conveying all of the nuances in the lyrics while providing a lovely, memorable visual." The Washington Post's Sarah Anne Hughes wrote Beyoncé is "extravagantly dressed" in the video adding that the only downside is that there is no dance in the tradition of "Single Ladies (Put a Ring on It)" (2008). Kara Warner of MTV News called "Run the World (Girls)" and "Best Thing I Never Had", "as different as night and day" adding that the same thing happened with their music videos. Werner further praised Beyoncé' "gorgeous" dress and added that it "will likely land on a few style blogs soon, given its embroidered and jeweled details, not to mention the silk bows and ruching on the sides". A writer of The Huffington Post described the video as a transition to the one for "Run the World". Cristina Everett of Daily News noted that the look of satisfaction and hapinness on her face make the video the best revenge for her ex-lover. Pitchfork Media's Tom Breihan noted that Beyoncé was looking "makeup-commercial-flawless". He also wrote that if country singer Kellie Pickler remade the video shot-for-shot, it would never leave CMT rotation for it is "a perfect CMT video".

Erika Ramirez of Billboard magazine praised the video, "What better way to show your ex they're the best thing you never had than with saying 'I Do' to someone bigger and better in a Baracci Beverly Hills wedding gown." Jason Lipshutz of the same publication described it as a "smile-inducing clip with a dream wedding". A writer of Rap-Up praised the video's "fairytale" ending. Gordon Smart of Ashleigh Rainbird of the Daily Mirror found Beyoncé, "looking sexy in white lacy undies and garter – and later in a Big Fat Gypsy Wedding-style frock". Amos Barshad of New York magazine commented, "To just full-on hammer down the whole 'mature and settled down and happy' thing, Mrs. Hova saunters around with the most irrepressible smile you've ever seen, shimmying amazingly (note the moves at 3:30) as home footage of that jerk she threw away like a parking ticket cuts in and out." The music video peaked at number one on the UK TV Airplay Chart, logging 634 plays on July 24, 2011.

=== Alternate video ===
On July 26, 2011, Beyoncé announced plans to make an alternative music video for "Best Thing I Never Had ". She asked her fans to send pictures from their weddings or prom day experiences, which would be included in a re-edited version of the video. This alternate video was scheduled for release in September 2011. However, it premiered on October 11, 2011, on Celebuzz. Charli Penn of Essence magazine praised the alternate video for "Best Thing I Never Had" calling it a "must-see" video and adding that "it has already become a huge hit with fans".

== Live performances ==
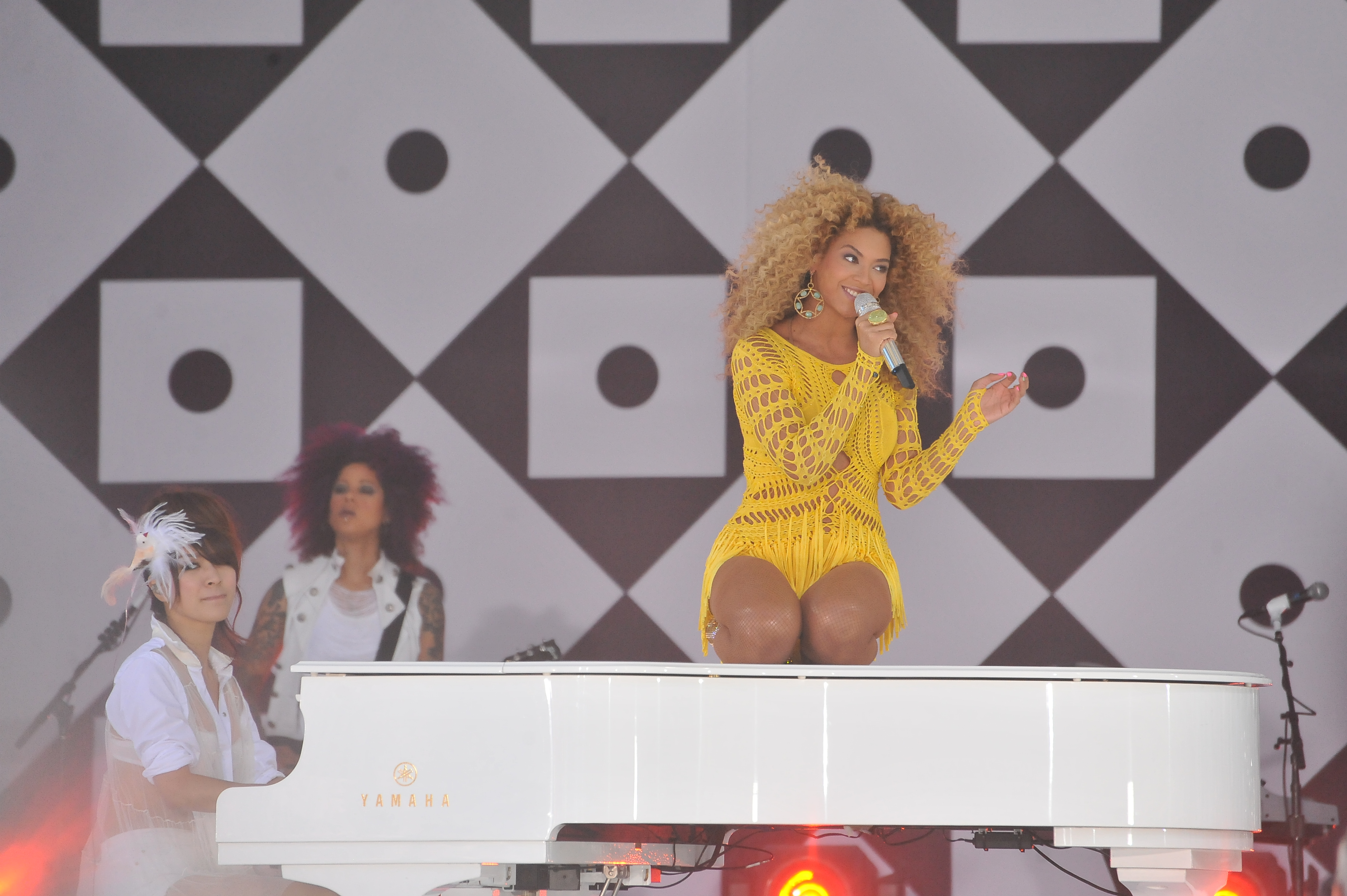
Beyoncé performing on Good Morning America's Summer Concert Series.

Wearing a pink fringe dress, Beyoncé performed "Best Thing I Never Had" live for the first time during her concert at Palais Nikaïa in Nice, France on June 20, 2011. She then sang the ballad on June 26, 2011, at her historic headlining Glastonbury Festival Performance, where she was the first major solo female headliner to appear on the Pyramid stage in over twenty years. She was wearing a low-cut and sequined gold jacket while performing. Beyoncé's performance of "Best Thing I Never Had" at the Glastonbury Festival was broadcast in the US during the 2011 BET Awards later the same day. On June 28, 2011, she performed the song during the finale of X Factor France, dressed in a Roman-style dress. On July 1, 2011, Beyoncé gave a free concert, including on Good Morning America as part of its Summer Concert Series. Wearing a yellow fringe dress and gold stilettos, she sang "Best Thing I Never Had". Dressed in a black gown, Beyoncé sang the ballad at the 35th Annual Macy's 4th of July Fireworks Spectacular to an audience, which included serving members of the armed forces.

Beyoncé performed "Best Thing I Never Had" on The View and on Late Night with Jimmy Fallon. During the performance on Late Night with Jimmy Fallon, she was dressed in white dress and backed by house band The Roots. Brad Wete of Entertainment Weekly wrote that Beyoncé "flipped the track three ways—first" as she performed it in its piano-driven as heard on the album, then adopted a funky style to chant the second verse, before ending in jazzy fashion on the bridge. Caroline Shin of New York magazine described Beyoncé's performance as powerful. She performed "Best Thing I Never Had" on August 14, 2011, during the 4 Intimate Nights with Beyoncé revue, held at the Roseland Ballroom, in New York City. Wearing a gold dress, Beyoncé sang it to an audience of 3,500, and was backed by her all-female band as well as her backing singers, called the Mamas. Maura Johnston of The Village Voice wrote that the fans who attended the show, "were able to watch her bask in their singing the supremely confident 'Irreplaceable' and 'Best Thing I Never Had' as fearlessly as they might at home." Jon Caramanica of The New York Times wrote that the performance "hums beautifully but not powerfully", and added that Beyoncé was "practically in earth mother mode, a healer curing her minions". During the ITV special A Night With Beyoncé which aired on December 4 in the United Kingdom, Beyoncé performed the ballad to a selected crowd of fans.

== Other versions and cover versions ==
Smith posted the original version of the song on his website, The Super Random, on July 28, 2011. On August 18, 2011, rappers and producers Lil Jon and Shawty Putt revealed their DJ Kontrol Remix of "Best Thing I Never Had". The song was remixed to incorporate elements of funk and hip hop genres, according to Rap-Up. Lil Jon mixed Beyoncé's vocals over a sample of The Gap Band’s 1982 single, "Outstanding". This remix features percussive beats and a rap verse by Putt.

The Horrors, an English new wave band, performed a cover version of "Best Thing I Never Had" during an edition of the Live Lounge on BBC Radio 1. Chris Coplan of Consequence of Sound wrote, "[...] reworking the song from fierce anthem to a decidedly Smiths-ian weep-fest, the lads struck the perfect balance between the sass of the original and their own depressing sound." Krissi Murison of NME commented that their cover was "undoubtedly the greatest song psychedelic shoegaze never had". "Best Thing I Never Had" was also covered by The X Factor contestant, Craig Colton, during the second week of the competition, in accordance with the theme 'Love and Heartbreak'.

== Formats and track listings ==
- Digital download
1. "Best Thing I Never Had" – 4:12
- German CD single
1. "Best Thing I Never Had" – 4:13
2. "Run the World (Girls)" (Kaskade Club Remix) – 5:03
- Digital Remixes EP
1. "Best Thing I Never Had" (Gareth Wyn Remix) – 6:33
2. "Best Thing I Never Had" (Olli Collins & Fred Portelli Remix) – 6:23
3. "Best Thing I Never Had" (Billionaire Remix) – 4:40
4. "Best Thing I Never Had" (Moguai Remix) – 6:17

== Credits and personnel ==
Credits adapted from 4 liner notes.

- Val Brathwaite – mixer assistant
- Antonio Dixon – producer, songwriter
- Kenneth "Babyface" Edmonds – producer, songwriter
- Gloria Kaba – engineer assistant
- Beyoncé Knowles – vocals, producer, songwriter
- Caleb Sean McCampbell – producer, songwriter
- Tony Maserati – mixer
- Serge Nudel – engineer assistant
- Symbolyc One – producer, songwriter
- Rob Suchecki – guitar
- Patrick "J. Que" Smith – songwriter
- Shea Taylor – producer, songwriter
- Pete Wolford – engineer assistant
- Jordan "DJ Swivel" Young – recorder

== Charts ==
=== Weekly charts ===
Chart (2011)	Peak position
Australia (ARIA)	17
Australian Urban (ARIA)	6
Austria (Ö3 Austria Top 40)	39
Belgium (Ultratop 50 Flanders)	50
Belgium (Ultratip Bubbling Under Wallonia)	8
Brazil (Hot 100 Airplay)	5
Canada (Canadian Hot 100)	27
Canada AC (Billboard)	31
Canada CHR/Top 40 (Billboard)	26
Canada Hot AC (Billboard)	18
Croatia International Airplay (HRT)	1
Czech Republic (Rádio – Top 100)	29
Denmark (Tracklisten)	24
France (SNEP)	61
Germany (GfK)	29
Global Dance Songs (Billboard)	30
Hungary (Editors' Choice Top 40)	18
Ireland (IRMA)	2
Israel (Media Forest)	10
Italy (FIMI)	43
Japan (Japan Hot 100)	14
Netherlands (Dutch Top 40)	23
Netherlands (Single Top 100)	37
New Zealand (Recorded Music NZ)	5
Portugal Digital Song Sales (Billboard)	8
Scotland (OCC)	3
Slovakia (Rádio Top 100)	2
South Africa (Mediaguide)	2
South Korea International (Gaon)	1
Spain (Promusicae)	46
Sweden (Sverigetopplistan)	44
Switzerland (Schweizer Hitparade)	35
UK Singles (OCC)	3
UK R&B (OCC)	1
US Billboard Hot 100	16
US Adult R&B Songs (Billboard)	18
US Dance Club Songs (Billboard)	1
US Hot R&B/Hip-Hop Songs (Billboard)	4
US Pop Airplay (Billboard)	15
US Rhythmic (Billboard)	7

=== Monthly charts ===
Chart (2011)	Position
South Korea International (Gaon)	1

=== Year-end charts ===
Chart (2011)	Position
Australia (ARIA)	90
Australian Urban (ARIA)	35
Brazil (Crowley)	91
Croatia International Airplay (HRT)	6
South Korea International (Gaon)	6
UK Singles (OCC)	34
UK R&B (OCC)	6
US Billboard Hot 100	86
US Hot R&B/Hip-Hop Songs (Billboard)	25
US Rhythmic (Billboard)	36

== Certifications ==
Certifications and sales for "Best Thing I Never Had"
Region	Certification	Certified units/sales
Australia (ARIA)	4× Platinum	280,000^{‡}
Brazil (Pro-Música Brasil)	Diamond	250,000^{‡}
Canada (Music Canada)	2× Platinum	160,000^{‡}
Denmark (IFPI Danmark)	Platinum	90,000^{‡}
Germany (BVMI)	Gold	150,000^{‡}
New Zealand (RMNZ)	2× Platinum	60,000^{‡}
South Korea Digital	—	1,011,224 (Note: The album version of "Best Thing I Never Had" had sold 187,712 digital units in South Korea by the end of 2011, while the single version sold 823,512 units.)
Sweden (GLF)	Platinum	40,000^{‡}
United Kingdom (BPI)	2× Platinum	1,200,000^{‡}
United States (RIAA)	4× Platinum	4,000,000^{‡}
^{‡} Sales+streaming figures based on certification alone.

== Release history ==
Release dates and formats for "Best Thing I Never Had"
Region	Date	Format(s)	Label(s)	Ref.
United States	June 1, 2011	Digital download	Parkwood; Columbia	
Italy	June 3, 2011	Radio airplay	Sony Music	
United Kingdom	July 3, 2011	Digital download	RCA	
Germany	July 29, 2011	CD	Sony Music	
Australia	September 2, 2011	Digital download (EP)	Sony Music	

== See also ==
- List of number-one dance singles of 2011 (U.S.)
- List of UK R&B Chart number-one singles of 2011
- List of number-one international songs of 2011 (South Korea)
- List of UK top 10 singles in 2011
