= Bad Guy (Eminem song) =

Song by Eminem

from the album The Marshall Mathers LP 2
- Released: November 5, 2013
- Studio: Effigy Studios (Ferndale, Michigan)
- Genre: Hip hop
- Length: 7:14
- Label: Aftermath; Shady; Interscope
- Songwriters: Marshall Mathers; Larry Griffin; Mark Landon; Sarah Jaffe; StreetRunner; Vinny Venditto; Stephen Hacker; Michael Aiello; Walter Murphy; Gian Reverberi; Laura Giordano
- Producers: S1; M-Phazes (part 1); StreetRunner; Vinny Venditto (part 2)

"Bad Guy" is a song by American rapper Eminem, taken from his eighth album The Marshall Mathers LP 2 (2013). The song connects the second LP to the first Marshall Mathers LP, which was released in 2000. "Bad Guy" is also a sequel to Eminem's hit single "Stan", which appears on the aforementioned album.

The track consists of two parts; Part I was produced by S1 and M-Phazes, and Part II was produced by StreetRunner and Vinny Venditto. The song was written by the four, alongside Eminem, S. Hacker, M. Aiell and Sarah Jaffe, the latter of which is featured singing the song's refrain. The song samples "Hocus Pokus", as performed by Walter Murphy; "Soana", written by Gian Piero Reverberi and Laura Giordano; as well as "Ode to Billie Joe", as performed by Lou Donaldson.

"Bad Guy" was met with universal acclaim from music critics, with the most praise going towards the song's storytelling. It debuted at number 38 on the US Billboard Hot R&B/Hip-Hop Songs, upon the album's release. It is the longest song Eminem has ever released on any of his albums, clocking in at 7 minutes and 14 seconds.

== Background and theme ==
In "Bad Guy", Eminem plays the role of Matthew Mitchell, the little brother of the Stan character Eminem portrayed in The Marshall Mathers LP single, "Stan". The song "Stan" recounts the story of an obsessed, mentally ill young man, a fan named Stan who kills himself, his girlfriend and their unborn child because Eminem was not responding to his letters, until it was too late. On "Bad Guy", Stan's brother Matthew is older now and wants revenge against Eminem. Eminem sees Matthew "skulking around his driveway with a knife and in a novelistic flourish, he details that Matthew's 'mouth is full of saliva' as he circles the house." Matthew then kidnaps Eminem, throws him in the trunk of his car, and then drives around Detroit listening to The Marshall Mathers LP. Just like in "Stan", Eminem raps the final verse from his perspective. Throughout the song he also makes references back to "Stan" and The Marshall Mathers LP. Into the second part of the song, the production fades out and Eminem battles his alter-ego, Slim Shady, in his head.

Eminem spoke on the song saying; "Making the 'Bad Guy' record I felt like I want to make sure that I make something that ties in with The Marshall Mathers LP. You know, the first one. And I wanted to make it make sense that if I'm gonna go down this road, this could be ready for what's about to happen. So, it's kinda like to me the song the way I was thinking when I wrote it was like, 'What if this nightmare just happened that I decided to do this album and everything just started coming back on me?' Matthew came back, Stan's little brother, and he came back to kill me. Just all this shit just started happening. So, it was kinda like 'Bad Guy' to me is more like, technically to me, is more like an intro to the album, like, okay, this is what's about to happen. Here it is. And then picking up from the 'Criminal' skit where The Marshall Mathers LP left off. I don't know if anyone caught that, but that's kind of where the continuation starts."

== Writing and production ==
The song is split into two parts, the first part was produced by S1 and M-Phazes, while the second was produced by StreetRunner and Vinny Venditto. Sarah Jaffe, who works with S1 in a group called the Dividends, provided songwriting and sang the song's refrain. Eminem originally considered getting Dido on the song, but did not want to give away the "Stan" reference. Additional keys on the song was provided by I.L.O and the song was recorded at Effigy Studios in Ferndale, Michigan, by Mike Strange, Joe Strange and Tony Campana.

The first part of the beat started with Australian producer M-Phazes, and then S1 added his production to it. "From there, S1 sent the beat to Sarah Jaffe, who wrote the chorus in her car, as she was in the process of moving." S1 then took their finished part of the beat to an A&R at Interscope Records, who immediately loved it and sent it to Eminem for usage on the album. StreetRunner said his part of the beat started off with a sample, of "Soana", written by G. Reverberi and L. Giordano. He continued saying, "My man, Vinny Venditto, played the pianos and strings on it and then I started working on this drum break that just came together real good on the track. Honestly this beat is one of my more effortless tracks that I produced. It came together well, can’t really say I was struggling with this beat. When I made it, I took it to my guy and said, "This is going to be one of Eminem’s beats right here." He had his doubts. [Laughs] But I was confident in that track when I was done with it. I was really glad that he picked it when it came together." The first part of the production is a repetitive synth loop; then it twists into darkness with the strings of Gian Piero Reverberi's "Soana" underpinned by the drum break of "Ode to Billie Joe".

== Critical reception ==
"Bad Guy" was met with universal acclaim from music critics, with the most praise going towards the song's storytelling. Logan Smithson of PopMatters called it a phenomenal track saying, "'Bad Guy', is one of the most awe-inspiring pieces of storytelling in hip-hop in quite some time. I'd love to go more in depth, but at the risk of ruining the surprise for those who haven't yet heard it, I'll just leave it at that." Julia Leconte of Now cited "Bad Guy", as one of the examples for Eminem being, "one of the best all-time storytellers in rap." Erika Ramirez of Billboard said, "Eminem introduces The Marshall Mathers LP 2 by bringing his dark side to light and calling out his transgression through the voice of Stan’s vengeful brother, Matthew Mitchell. One of the best songs on the album for its shifting storytelling, Eminem comes face-to-face with his worst enemy by playing off the narration of 'Stan'." Andy Baber of Music OMH said, "The song is a lyrical masterpiece, cleverly channeling the criticisms thrown at Eminem over the years through the perspective of Stan’s brother."

DJBooth said, "'Bad Guy' is an ostensible follow up to the classic 'Stan' that's an absolutely masterpiece of storytelling; this is Marshall Mathers at his lyrical and conceptual best." Craig Jenkins of Pitchfork Media referred to the song as a sprawling epic. Christopher R. Weingarten of Spin said, "Bad Guy" "is a seven-minute Charlie Kaufman movie that Rap Genius should have a heck of a time untangling, cast-wise: It sounds like Eminem, Slim Shady, Marshall Mathers, Stan's little brother Matthew, adenoidal '98 Eminem, his own conscience (or lack thereof), 8 Mile protagonist Rabbit Smith, there's a lot going on." Matthew Miller of Pretty Much Amazing spoke of the song saying, "Lyrically it’s perfect, a "Lose Yourself" style thriller, and it’s one of the few songs that live up to the astronomical Shady standards."

Jesal 'Jay Soul' Padania of RapReviews said, "'Bad Guy' is absolutely classic Eminem, picking right where the first installment left off - the lyricism is epic, the voices dead on, the musical vibe just right. Unfortunately, as the track switches for the last two minutes, we get the latter day shouty version and although he gradually dials down to a whisper (a la 'One Mic'), the effect is slightly jarring." Nick Catucci of Entertainment Weekly said, "while "Bad Guy" — which recognizes that he's no better than the bullies who damaged him — might be the closest Em's come to a mea culpa, it still fails to justify his cranking the cycle back up again."

== Chart performance ==
Chart (2013)	Peak position
UK Singles (The Official Charts Company)	138
UK Hip Hop/R&B (Official Charts)	26
US Bubbling Under Hot 100 (Billboard)	9
US Hot R&B/Hip-Hop Songs (Billboard)	38

== Certifications ==
Certifications for "Bad Guy"
Region	Certification	Certified units/sales
Australia (ARIA)	Gold	35,000^{‡}
^{‡} Sales+streaming figures based on certification alone.

== Real-life event ==
In 2020, a man who was coincidentally also named Matthew (last name Hughes) broke into Eminem’s house to kill him, in a similar way to the lyrics in the song. He unsuccessfully tried to break in once before in 2019 in a house previously belonging to the artist. Hughes was 26 years old in the previous-break in, the exact age Stan's brother would have been that year.

Hughes was later sentenced to five years probation after serving more than a year in jail, and had previously had several brushes with the law. However, in August 2024, Hughes would attempt another break-in at Eminem's property, resulting in the Macomb County jury sentencing Hughes to the maximum sentence of 10 to 35 years, plus 3½ years, consecutively for both first-degree home invasion and aggravated stalking.
