= College Hoops 2K8 =

2007 basketball video game

- Developer(s): Visual Concepts
- Publisher(s): 2K
- Platform(s): PlayStation 2, PlayStation 3, Xbox 360
- Release: November 19, 2007
- Genre(s): Sports

College Hoops 2K8 is a 2007 sports game developed by Visual Concepts and published by 2K. It was released on November 19, 2007 for the Xbox 360, PlayStation 2, and PlayStation 3. The cover features Greg Oden, formerly of the Ohio State Buckeyes.

Almost every school competing in Division I NCAA college basketball at the time was included in 2K8, including recent additions South Carolina-Upstate, Cal State-Bakersfield and Florida Gulf Coast. Not included were Presbyterian College and North Carolina Central, D-1 independents. Also, Centenary College of the Summit League was unlicensed and instead named UL-Calcutta. The game also featured the ability to change and modify rosters and share them online via the newly introduced 2K Share feature. The real coaches feature was dropped from this game, possibly because the coaches chose not to renew their contracts and all of the coaches are unnamed.

The announcers/commentators featured in the game were Verne Lundquist and Bill Raftery. The College Hoops series was put on hiatus in 2008 as 2K Sports declined to seek the college license for a 2K9 release. However, EA Sports continued licensing rights from the NCAA to make college basketball games until they too discontinued their college basketball game series, in 2010.

== Features ==
- Legacy Mode-Open and Career modes
- Tournament Mode (customize, NCAA, and conference)
- Create-a-Team mode
- Quick game mode (Play now)
- Create-a-Player
- On the fly playcalling
- Manage Rosters
- Game Sliders (Optionable)
- Customize Rosters
- Improved and enhanced gameplay
- Over 328 division 1 teams, authentic jerseys and arenas
- Create-a-Chant

== Legacy mode ==
In this type of campaign, the user has the option of going with Career Legacy or Open Legacy. In Career Legacy, the user is allowed to choose between only a hand-selected group of universities, each ranked towards the bottom of their respective athletic conferences. The goal for the user is almost always to take one of these universities of their choosing and perform well enough as the head coach to move on to a more prestigious university, though nothing prevents the user from staying at their beginning university for as long as they'd like. They would, however, miss out on various goals, as described in the next paragraph, that would allow their coach to increase in ability. The user has the ability to get fired from their head coaching position at a university, forcing them to only be able to accept lower-tier coaching positions that may offer them, with the possibility of not receiving any coaching offers after termination, leading to the user's retirement, and forcing them back to the main menu. If your coach is successful, you can play for as long as 40 years before retirement, and receiving a pop-up message after the postseason awards in the year 2048 from the game itself, congratulating you on your career before taking you back to the main menu. In Open Legacy, the user can choose any school and begin their legacy. The user can coach for as long as they would like and does not face any possibility of termination from their university.

In Legacy, the coach the user plays as has coach ratings in different areas such as: Offense, for increasing the offensive awareness of your team's players; Defense, for increasing the defensive awareness of your team's players; Scouting, your coach's ability to create game preparations for the teams you are playing against in a week, updated every week; Charisma, used for recruiting high school and junior college recruits as well as increasing the morale of the players on your roster; and Discipline, used for making your coaching emphases more effective when used during played games, with several other categories. In Career, you initially start out with a C− grade (from F to A+) in each category, and are given 5 points to start out with that you can assign to any of the categories. These grades can only rise by a single grade at a given time. For example, if a user's Offense rating is at C−, the next highest grade is a C, followed by a C+, followed by a B−. In Career mode, your coach can only increase in ratings in each of these categories by accomplishing certain goals set out for your character and gaining skill points, such as signing an overseas recruit, finishing a season with a winning record, signing the highest-ranked recruit in your team's home state, and winning a national Championship, among many others. Some goals are simple and easy to accomplish, such as finishing a season with a winning record, for users starting out in Career mode so the user can more easily ascend the college basketball hierarchy and move on to a more prestigious program, while other goals are likely only going to be accomplished at top-tier college basketball programs, such as signing a 5-star recruit or winning the national Championship. Some goals may not be accomplished at the same time, such as signing a 5-star recruit from overseas only allowing the user to accomplish the goal of signing an overseas prospect, because the recruiting rankings system in College Hoops 2K8 grades "World" (non-North American) recruits and "National" (North American) recruits on a different scale. Other goals may only be accomplished by moving on from the school the user selected at the beginning of Career mode, such as the goal of accepting the head coaching position at a "Mid-Major" school, with all of the beginning schools playing in athletic conferences marked as "Small", the lowest rung on the conference ranking ladder that includes "Mid-Major", "Major", and "Power". When you accomplish any of these goals, your user is rewarded with 1 skill point per goal accomplished, with the application of these skill points granted following the national championship game and post-season awards. In Open Legacy mode, the user plays as the coach for whichever team they decide to select from the outset, and has the option to make their coach as poorly-rated or highly-rated as they desire, with unlimited skill points available from the beginning of the game.

Taking place in the Legacy Mode and setting apart College Hoops 2k8 from other basketball games is the ability to track and recruit high-school and Junior College players. This unique feature was also available in the previous installments in the College Hoops 2K series, College Hoops 2K6 and College Hoops 2K7.

== Soundtrack ==
- Arabian Prince - "Professor X Saga"
- ARIV feat Page - "Weatherman"
- Bumblebeez - "Black Dirt"
- Deltron 3030 - "Positive Contact"
- Dilated Peoples - "Spit It Clearly"
- E Reece - "Just Move" (Bautista Remix)
- Guilty Simpson - "Make It Fast"
- The Heliocentrics - "Joyride"
- Hot Chip - "My Piano" (Radio mix)
- J Dilla & MF Doom (feat. Guilty Simpson) - "MASH"
- James Pants - "You're Doing It"
- Jurassic 5 - "Without a Doubt"
- Liars - "Plaster Casts of Everything"
- Oh No - "Chump"
- Panthers - "Goblin City"
- Percee P - "Legendary Lyricist"
- DJ Romanowski - "Lord Of The Pants" (2-Cents Remix)
- Ski Beats - "Idea"
- Strange Fruit Project - "Underclassmen"
- Strange Fruit Project - "Through The Lane"
- TOPKAT - "Til' U Had Enough"
- The Black Lips - "It Feels Alright"
- The Kooks - "Eddie's Gun"

== Reception ==
Reception

Aggregate scores
Aggregator	Score
GameRankings	(PS3) 80.96% (X360) 80.96% (PS2) 64.50%
Metacritic	(PS3) 82/100 (X360) 81/100 (PS2) 66/100

Review scores
Publication	Score
Electronic Gaming Monthly	7.17/10
Game Informer	7.75/10
GameSpot	8/10
GameSpy	(PS2)
GameZone	(X360) 8.4/10 (PS3) 8.3/10
IGN	(X360) 8.2/10 (PS3) 8/10 (PS2) 6.9/10
Official Xbox Magazine (US)	8.5/10
PlayStation: The Official Magazine	4/5 stars
TeamXbox	8/10
Maxim	8/10
USA Today	8/10 stars

The game was met with positive to mixed reception upon release. GameRankings and Metacritic gave it a score of 80.96% and 82 out of 100 for the PlayStation 3 version; 80.96% and 81 out of 100 for the Xbox 360 version; and 64.50% and 66 out of 100 for the PlayStation 2 version.

== See also ==
- NBA 2K8
