= Have a Nice Day (band) =

Australian pop band

- Also known as: HAND
- Origin: Melbourne, Victoria, Australia
- Genres: Power pop
- Years active: 1989–1994
- Labels: Shock; White/Mushroom/Festival
- Past members: Glenn Lewis; Fiona Lee Maynard; Glenn Maynard; Marc Welsh; Monique Boggia; James Lomas

Have a Nice Day or HAND were an Australian power pop group formed in 1989 by Glenn Lewis on lead guitar, Fiona Lee Maynard on lead vocals and bass guitar, and her younger brother, Glenn Maynard on drums. Marc Welsh replaced Lewis on lead guitar in 1990 and the group supported local gigs by international artists, Mudhoney, Concrete Blonde, Faith No More and Suzi Quatro. They issued two studio albums, Explore (1991) and Handlelight (1993). In December 1993 Welsh was replaced on guitar by James Lomas with Monique Boggia added on keyboards before the group disbanded in March 1994.

== History ==
Have a Nice Day (often given as the initialism, HAND) were formed in 1989 in Melbourne by Glenn Lewis on lead guitar, Fiona Lee Maynard on lead vocals and bass guitar, and her younger brother, Glenn Maynard on drums. According to Australian musicologist, Ian McFarlane, they were "essentially a power pop outfit with a metallic edge... Fronted by the confident and talented Fiona Lee Maynard." The group's influences, "ranged from Cheap Trick, Kiss and The Ramones to Suzi Quatro and The Buzzcocks."

Marc Welsh replaced Lewis on lead guitar in 1990 and the group supported local gigs by international artists, Mudhoney, Concrete Blonde, Faith no More and Suzi Quatro. They released their debut single, "Fill Me Up", in August 1990. The lead track was written by Fiona Lee, while its B-side, "Jannifer", was written by Welsh. Fiona Lee and Welsh became domestic partners. A six-track, self-titled extended play followed via Shock Records, late in that year, with Paul Tagg producing. McFarlane observed that it was, "full of energetic and passionate pop."

The group's debut studio album, Explore, was issued in September 1991 with Kevin Shirley producing, engineering and mixing. Woroni's reviewer rated it at four-and-a-half stars out of five and explained, "[its] a top debut album, full of loud crunching guitars, sliding vocal (dis)harmonies and killer song writing... The sound is a melting pot for a large variety of styles – punk, indie, metal on the hard edge and pop, caressing the listener before the loud bits come back to throw you back in your seat." Whereas McFarlane felt, "[it] mixed melodic power pop ('Comfort and Solitude', 'These Are Memories', the single 'Get to Know You') with crunching heavy rock ('Lady of the Lake')."

They released a three-track EP, Slipped Away, in March 1992. In April of the following year they supported a tour by United States group, Extreme. Have a Nice Day issued two singles, "All of Me" (May 1993) and "You Understand" (September); and followed with their second album, Handlelight, in October. It was produced, engineered and mixed by Mark Deamley. McFarlane stated that it provided, "a mellower sound overall, with ballads like 'Not Crying Anymore' being the most effective tracks." In December Welsh was replaced on guitar by James Lomas with Monique Boggia added on keyboards. The group played their final shows in March 1994.

=== Afterwards ===
Fiona Lee Maynard started her solo career with her version of "Not Crying Anymore", as a single in August 1994 and followed with a reworked version of Handlelight issued as My Time in November. Fiona Lee and Lomas became domestic partners and later married. In 1995 the pair formed another group, In Vivo, which included members of Concrete Blonde. They released a self-titled album in January 1996, which was produced by Johnette Napolitano (of Concrete Blonde). The group toured Australia in 1997 and again in 1998. In that year, Fiona Lee and Lomas with Kris Harris on drums for In Vivo added Dave Thomas on guitar. They recorded an EP, Scary (June 1999) with Boggia on keyboards.

Glenn Maynard had joined Violetine, and in mid-1997 he moved into alternate rockers, Pollyanna, on drums during recording of that group's second album, Hello Halo (late 1997). He left before they released their fourth album, Didn't Feel a Thing, in July 2001. In June 2013 Fiona Lee organised and performed in a tribute concert for former Divinyls singer, Chrissy Amphlett, who had died in April of that year.

As of 2025, the Maynard siblings are currently playing in the Painters and Dockers, while Lewis is lead guitarist in The Mavis's.

== Discography ==
=== Albums ===
- Explore (September 1991) – White Label Records/Mushroom Records/Festival Records (D24002 (D30590))
- Handlelight (October 1993) - never released, was instead reworked into Fiona Lee's 1994 debut solo album

=== Extended plays ===
- Have a Nice Day (late 1990) – Shock Records (Shock CD 004)
- Slipped Away (March 1992) – White Label Records (D11075)

=== Singles ===
- "Fill Me Up" (August 1990) – Shock Records (Shock 701)
- "Get to Know You" (1991) – White Label Records (K11003)
- "All of Me" (May 1993) – Mushroom Records
- "You Understand" (September 1993) – Mushroom Records
