= Strange Fruit Project =

American hip hop group

- Origin: Waco, Texas
- Genres: Hip Hop
- Years active: 2003–present
- Label: Om Records
- Members: Symbolyc One (S1); Myth; Myone

Strange Fruit Project is an underground hip hop group from Waco, Texas, which consists of producer and emcee Symbolyc One (also known as S1, born Larry D. Griffin Jr.), his cousin emcee Myth (short for Mythological, born Kevin Gaither) and emcee Myone (pronounced "My Own", born Anthony Ligawa, originally from Indiana). The trio officially debuted in 2004, with a pair of underground releases, Soul Travelin and From Divine. Their biggest exposure came with the release of their acclaimed 2006 album The Healing. The group's name is derived from the Billie Holiday civil rights song "Strange Fruit".

== History ==
=== Early years ===
The group's musical director S1 began playing musical instruments, including the piano, keyboards, and the drums, at a young age. His musical inspirations included legendary producers like Quincy Jones, Dr. Dre, Pete Rock and J Dilla. He and his cousin Myth began writing rhymes after hearing Run-D.M.C.'s classic 1986 album Raising Hell. In 1996, the cousins formed a duo named Symbolyc Elementz, and in May of that year, the duo was featured in The Source's "Unsigned Hype" column. S1 met Myone, at the time still a high school student, while working on a day job in 1998. Between 1999 and 2000, the three began recording together, and decided to officially form a group, under the name Strange Fruit Project. SFP released their first group single, "All the Way" b/w "Soul Travelin", in 2003.

=== 2004 to 2005 ===
The track "All the Way" was included on the group's debut album, Soul Travelin', released in early 2004 on Spilt Milk Records. The album was produced entirely by S1, except for the single "Eternally Yours", which was produced by up-and-coming beatmaker Illmind. The album received little attention, but "All the Way" received airplay on college radio stations, and was nominated for 2004 Song of the Year by BBC Radio. The group followed shortly with their second album, Soul Travelin, released in September 2004 on Split Milk Records. Like their debut, the album received little sales and attention, but garnered the group more attention within the hip hop community. Jeff Wade of the Dallas Observer described the album as "a soulful mixture of personal, from-the-heart lyrics, sweet harmonies and thumpin' drums". In 2005, the group collaborated with Wu-Tang Clan member Ghostface Killah and Trife da God on the single "Milk Em'", produced by S1. The track made the CMJ college radio charts in July and August 2005. The group had a second CMJ chart topper in 2005 with "The Broke Song". Later that year, S1 and Illmind released a collaboration producer-album titled The Art of One Mind. The band also provided the soundtrack to a Winterfresh gum commercial.

=== 2006 to present ===
Following the acclaim of their first two albums, and the success of the single "Milk 'Em", SFP were listed in URB magazine's "Next 100", and signed a record deal with Om Records. Their first single on the label, "Soul Clap" b/w "Special", was released in May 2006. The group gained considerable underground hype for their 2006 album The Healing, released in July 2006. The album featured production from S1, as well as Illmind, Jake One and 9th Wonder, and featured guest appearances from Erykah Badu, Little Brother, Darien Brockington and Yahzarah. The Healing was generally well received, and earned the group "Now Hear This" status on Okayplayer.com. Marisa Brown of Allmusic gave the album a 3.5/5 rating, calling it "an album of solidly good hip-hop". Justin Cober-Lake of PopMatters gave the album 7/10, commenting on its "hopeful, spiritual approach". S1 has continued his production career, signing licensing deals for MTV shows such as Run's House, Trippin' and Yo Momma.

== Discography ==
Album information
From Divine
- Released: September 6, 2002
- Label: Spilt Milk Records
- Singles: "A Place"
Soul Travelin'
- Released: May 11, 2004
- Label: Spilt Milk Records
- Singles: "All the Way", "Eternally Yours"/"Remember My Face", "Luv Is"
The Healing
- Released: July 25, 2006
- Label: Om Records
- Singles: "Soul Clap"/"Special", "Get Live"
M.A.S.K. (Making Art Sound Kool) EP
- Released: November 17, 2009
- Label: Soul Kontrollaz Production/Spilt Milk Records
A Dreamer's Journey
- Released: September 1, 2011
- Label: Self-published (Bandcamp/iTunes)
