= Lil Xan =

American rapper (born 1996)

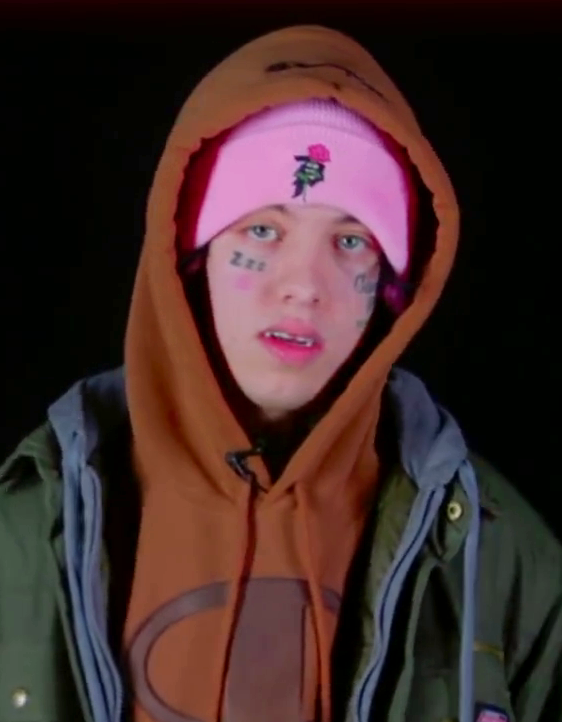
- Lil Xan in 2018

Background information
- Also known as: Diego
- Born: Nicholas Diego Leanos; September 6, 1996 (age 30); Redlands, California, U.S.
- Genres: Hip-hop; trap; emo rap; cloud rap; pop rap; mumble rap; SoundCloud rap
- Occupations: Rapper; singer; songwriter
- Years active: 2015–present
- Labels: Xanarchy; Columbia; 3rd Eye

Nicholas Diego Leanos (born September 6, 1996), better known as Lil Xan (/zæn/ ZANN) or simply Diego, is an American rapper, singer, and songwriter. He is best known for his song "Betrayed", which peaked at number 64 on the Billboard Hot 100. On April 6, 2018, Leanos released his debut studio album, Total Xanarchy. His second album, Diego, was released on September 6, 2024.

== Early life ==
Leanos was born on September 6, 1996, in Redlands, California. He grew up poor, with his family living in motels during most of his childhood. He attended Redlands East Valley High School, but dropped out in his freshman year. He then spent several years at home unemployed. Leanos took a job as a street cleaner and sold drugs before he began rapping. Leanos later pursued a photography career in support of several friends who were rappers. He eventually had his camera stolen and chose to begin rapping in lieu of investing in a new camera.

== Career ==
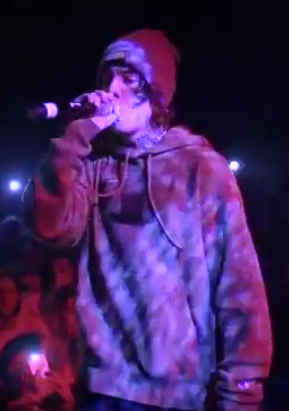
Lil Xan performing in 2018

Leanos's stage name is derived from Xanax, the trade name of the prescription drug alprazolam. Leanos began to gain recognition through platforms such as SoundCloud and YouTube. His popularity grew after the release of the music video for his song "Betrayed" in August 2017. The song peaked at number 64 on the Billboard Hot 100. Following this success, he signed with Columbia Records in November 2017 for a three-album deal worth over $1 million.

In an interview with XXL later that month, Leanos announced his debut album would be titled Total Xanarchy and would include collaborations with artists such as Diplo and Swae Lee. In December 2017, Leanos announced his Total Xanarchy tour, which sold out in five hours, according to Billboard. In 2018, Leanos considered changing his stage name to Diego in order to support his anti-drug message; however, he has since expressed uncertainty about officially going through with the pseudonym change.

Leanos released his debut studio album, Total Xanarchy, on April 6, 2018. The album received mostly negative reviews but was a modest commercial success, debuting at number ten on the Billboard 200 and selling 28,000 copies in its first week. The following month in May 2018, Leanos announced the mixtape Heartbreak Soldiers, which dropped on all platforms on July 8, 2018. Later in 2018 he released the EP Xanarchy Militia, and in 2019 he released the mixtape Heartbreak Soldiers Pt. 2 and the EP Fireworks, all of which were released exclusively on SoundCloud without any involvement from Columbia.

Leanos promised to release a second album multiple times over his career, but each time they experienced delays or cancellations. In September 2018, Leanos announced he had been working on an album titled Be Safe as a tribute to Mac Miller (whose last words to Leanos before his overdose earlier that month were "be safe"), but the project entered production limbo and was eventually scrapped. In November 2019, he announced his next album would be titled When September Ends and released an accompanying album cover, but this also never came to fruition. In January 2020, Leanos announced that his album was finished and that it would be called Sorry I Didn't Quit, revealing a new album cover that took inspiration from Lil Wayne's Sorry 4 the Wait, but this project appears to have been scrapped as well.

On June 24, 2022, Leanos and fellow emo rapper Chris Miles released the collaborative EP have a nice day. It includes a feature from Lil Tracy and was supported by the single "Miss Me".

In August 2024, Leanos announced that his second album, entitled Diego, was finished, and would receive an early release on the independent streaming platform Even Music on September 6, 2024. It was released on all platforms on September 19, marking his first full-length album release in over six years. Later that year, Leanos signed to the independent record label 3rd Eye Recordings.

== Artistry ==
Leanos has listed Pharrell Williams and N.E.R.D. as early influences in hip-hop, with other influences including Arctic Monkeys, Cage the Elephant, and Queens of the Stone Age. Leanos has also described Drake and Mac Miller as musical inspirations.

According to Pigeons & Planes, Leanos' music started off as "typical trap" and later shifted towards "a murkier, dream-like sound". The New Yorker has described Leanos as part of a "sad rap" movement.

== Personal life ==
Leanos has been open about his former addiction to benzodiazepines (particularly Xanax) and opiates. He overcame his Xanax addiction after two years. Leanos is outspoken against Xanax abuse and urges people to stop using the drug altogether. In 2018, Leanos was reportedly hospitalized after eating "too many Hot Cheetos".

Leanos started dating singer and actress Noah Cyrus on June 30, 2018. The couple released the collaboration "Live or Die" in August 2018. They broke up in September 2018, with both parties accusing the other of being unfaithful. Leanos would initially claim that the relationship was forced by the couple's record label, Columbia, though he later took responsibility for the breakup and said he has "nothing but love for the Cyrus family."

Leanos had an on-and-off relationship with social media personality Tana Mongeau in 2018 and again in 2021. He and Chris Miles, who also dated Mongeau, made their collaborative breakup song "Miss Me" about their relationships with her.

In February 2019, Leanos announced that he and his then-fiancée Annie Smith were expecting a child. Smith, however, claimed to have had a miscarriage, sharing the information about the incident via a video and photographs on Instagram. In a No Jumper interview weeks later, Leanos said he had suspicions that Smith had been faking her pregnancy after a number of the rapper's fans on social media pointed out that Smith's supposed ultrasound photos looked identical to ones that could be found using a Google Images search. The couple would split shortly thereafter, with Leanos claiming the relationship had been toxic.

During the COVID-19 pandemic, Leanos was residing in Corona, California while quarantining with his mother. During this time, he suffered severe anxiety attacks that prompted his mother to call 9-1-1 after she saw him hallucinating.

== Discography ==
=== Albums ===
Title	Album details	Peak chart positions
Title	Album details	US
Total Xanarchy	Release: April 6, 2018; Formats: CD, digital download; Label: Columbia	10
Diego	Release: September 6, 2024; Formats: Vinyl, digital download; Label: Independent	

=== Mixtapes ===
Title	Mixtape details
Heartbreak Soldiers	Release: July 8, 2018; Format: Digital download, streaming; Label: Columbia
Heartbreak Soldiers Pt. 2	Release: March 20, 2019; Formats: Digital download, streaming; Label: Columbia

=== Extended plays ===
Title	EP details
CITGO	Release: September 6, 2016; Format: Digital download, streaming, cassette; Label: Sleepcvlt (cassette)
Toothache	Release: June 19, 2017; Format: Digital download, streaming; Label: Independent
Xanarchy	Release: August 1, 2017; Format: Digital download, streaming; Label: Independent
Xanarchy Militia	Release: November 14, 2018; Format: Digital download, streaming; Label: Columbia
Fireworks	Release: February 19, 2019; Format: Streaming; Label: Columbia
have a nice day (with Chris Miles)	Release: June 24, 2022; Format: Digital download, streaming; Label: Boom.Records

=== Singles ===
==== As lead artist ====
Title	Year	Peak chart positions				Certification	Album
Title	Year	US	US R&B/ HH	CAN	SWE Heat.	Certification	Album
"Montana Doe"	2016	—	—	—	—		Non-album single
"Who Are You?" (with Oohdem Beatz)	2016	—	—	—	—		CITGO
"Center Fold" (with Julian Dova and Oohdem Beatz)	2016	—	—	—	—		Non-album singles
"Sorry" (with Oohdem Beatz)	2016	—	—	—	—		Non-album singles
"Vicodin" (with Julian Dova and Oohdem Beatz)	2017	—	—	—	—		Non-album singles
"Been Bout It"	2017	—	—	—	—		Non-album singles
"Xanarchy"	2017	—	—	—	—		Xanarchy
"No Love"	2017	—	—	—	—		Xanarchy
"Crash the Whip" (with $teven Cannon)	2017	—	—	—	—		Non-album single
"Slingshot"	2017	—	—	—	—	MC: Gold	Total Xanarchy
"Betrayed"	2017	64	28	49	11	RIAA: Platinum; MC: 2× Platinum	Toothache and Total Xanarchy
"Far"	2017	—	—	—	—		Total Xanarchy
"Water (Models)" (with Spell Jordan featuring Smokeasac)	2017	—	—	—	—		Non-album single
"Wake Up"	2017	—	—	—	—		Total Xanarchy
"Color Blind" (with Diplo)	2018	—	—	—	—	RIAA: Gold; MC: Gold	California and Total Xanarchy
"The Man" (featuring $teven Cannon)	2018	—	—	—	—		Total Xanarchy
"Moonlight" (with Charli XCX)	2018	—	—	—	—		Total Xanarchy
"Lies" (featuring Lil Skies)	2018	—	—	—	—		Heartbreak Soldiers
"Live or Die" (with Noah Cyrus)	2018	—	—	—	—		Non-album single
"Slope"	2018	—	—	—	—		Xanarchy Militia
"On Sight" (with Lucifena)	2018	—	—	—	—		Non-album singles
"Watch Me Fall"	2019	—	—	—	—		Non-album singles
"Tree Sap"	2019	—	—	—	—		Non-album singles
"Shake It"	2019	—	—	—	—		Pornhub Valentine's Day Album
"Summer Days"	2019	—	—	—	—		Fireworks
"Jewelry" (with DJ Stadium and PH4DE)	2019	—	—	—	—		Non-album singles
"I Might" (with $teven Cannon, YBN Nahmir, and YBN Almighty Jay)	2019	—	—	—	—		Non-album singles
"Bloody Nose"	2019	—	—	—	—		Non-album singles
"Midnight In Prague"	2019	—	—	—	—		Non-album singles
"West Side"	2019	—	—	—	—		Non-album singles
"Like Me"	2019	—	—	—	—		Non-album singles
"Wrong Way" (with Kidd Keo)	2019	—	—	—	—		Non-album singles
"Death to Mumble Rap 2" (with GAWNE)	2020	—	—	—	—		Eternal
"Willow"	2020	—	—	—	—		Non-album singles
"Wide Awake"	2020	—	—	—	—		Non-album singles
"Everything I Own"	2020	—	—	—	—		Non-album singles
"My Girlfriend"	2020	—	—	—	—		Non-album singles
"Life Sucks"	2021	—	—	—	—		Non-album singles
"Miss Me" (with Chris Miles)	2021	—	—	—	—		have a nice day
"Go Crazy" (with Imanbek and KDDK)	2021	—	—	—	—		Non-album singles
"Rebound" (with $teven Cannon and Kinfolk Jon)	2022	—	—	—	—		Non-album singles
"All Ur Best Friends" (with Goner)	2022	—	—	—	—		Non-album singles
"NODA"	2023	—	—	—	—		Diego
"So Pretty"	2023	—	—	—	—		Diego
"Used To"	2023	—	—	—	—		Diego
"Won't Overdose"	2024	—	—	—	—		Diego
"—" denotes a recording that did not chart or was not released in that territory.

==== As featured artist ====
Title	Year	Album
"Don't Trap on Me" (Ben Great featuring Lil Xan)	2017	Non-album singles
"Lifeless" (Chem X featuring Lil Xan)	2017	Non-album singles
"For the Better" (Kid Kaze featuring Lil Xan)	2017	Non-album singles
"Lost" (Joei Razook featuring Lil Xan)	2017	Non-album singles
"Whoa" (HenneyPapi featuring Lil Xan)	2018	Non-album singles
"Racksonracksonracks" (HenneyPapi featuring Lil Xan)	2018	Litlyfe II
"I Got" (Sonny Digital featuring Lil Xan and $teven Cannon)	2018	Non-album singles
"Wait" (Kid Kaze featuring Lil Xan)	2018	Non-album singles
"Yung Xan" (Yung Bans featuring Lil Xan)	2018	Yung Bans, Vol. 4
"Brainfreeze" (Prime Society featuring Lil Xan and $teven Cannon)	2018	Non-album single
"Crazy Shit" (Skooly featuring Lil Xan)	2018	Don't You Ever Forget Me 3
"Percy" (Lil Icepack featuring Lil Xan)	2018	Non-album singles
"Cookin'" (Blatz featuring $teven Cannon and Lil Xan)	2018	Non-album singles
"I Might" ($teven Cannon featuring Lil Xan)	2018	Lowkey
"Swimming" (Baby Goth featuring Trippie Redd and Lil Xan)	2018	Baby Goth
"Purpple Hearts" (Diablo featuring Lil Xan and Smokepurpp)	2019	Non-album single
"Lost at Sea" (Lucifena featuring Lil Xan)	2019	Mood Swings
"Feel" (Lucifena featuring Lil Xan)	2019	Mood Swings
"XOXO" (Jumex featuring Lil Xan)	2020	Non-album single
"OMG its Rarri" (Rarri featuring Lil Xan)	2020	Universe 444
"Gassed" (Kinfolk Jon featuring Lil Xan and $teven Cannon)	2020	Non-album singles
"Girls Girls Girls" ($teven Cannon featuring Lil Xan)	2020	Non-album singles
"Phone" (C.R.O featuring Lil Xan)	2020	Non-album singles
"TITI" (Diablo featuring Lil Xan and Harry Nach)	2020	Non-album singles
"Down for Life" (Ola Runt featuring Lil Xan and Diablo)	2021	Atlanta's Most Wanted
"Stars" (Steve Aoki featuring Lil Xan)	2022	Hiroquest: Genesis
"Gorgeous" ($teven Cannon featuring Lil Xan)	2023	TROUBLES IN the TRAP, Vol. 2

== Awards and nominations ==
Year	Award	Category	Nominated work	Result	Ref.
2018	MTV Video Music Awards	Push Artist of the Year	Lil Xan	Nominated	
2018	MTV Europe Music Awards	Best Push	Lil Xan	Nominated	
