= Chris Miles (musician) =

American rapper

- Born: Christopher Miles Marshak; May 3, 1999 (age 27); Long Island, New York
- Genres: Hip hop, emo rap, pop punk
- Occupation: Rapper
- Years active: 2012-present
- Labels: T3 Music Group, Warner/Chappell Music, Warner Music Group
- Website: chrismilesmusic.com

Christopher Miles Marshak, known by his stage name Chris Miles, is an American rapper signed to T3 Music Group. He gained popularity when his rap audition for America's Got Talent went viral.

== Discography ==
=== Studio albums ===
- Nothing Matters Anymore. (2020)

=== Mixtapes ===
- I Am Me (2012)
- Growing Pains (2013)
- Birth of Cool (2014)
- happy (2019)
- p.s. im sorry (2019)
- before it’s over (2019)

=== EPs ===
- milestones (2016)
- have a nice day (with Lil Xan) (2022)
- voice memos (2023)

=== Singles ===
| Year | Single | Album |
|---|---|---|
| 2012 | "Dial Tone" | I Am Me (Mixtape) |
| 2012 | "80 Bars" | I Am Me (Mixtape) |
| 2012 | "Shut It Down" (with Traphik) | I Am Me (Mixtape) |
| 2012 | "80 Bars Pt. II" | I Am Me (Mixtape) |
| 2013 | "Bounce" | I Am Me (Mixtape) |
| 2013 | "Zonin' Out" | I Am Me (Mixtape) |
| 2013 | "80 Bars Pt. III" | Growing Pains (Mixtape) |
| 2013 | "80 Bars Pt. IV" (featuring DJ Baby Chino) | Non-album single |
| 2014 | "Knew That" | Birth of Cool (Mixtape) |
| 2021 | "Miss Me" (with Lil Xan) | have a nice day (EP) |
| 2022 | "Nothing Feels the Same" (with Lil Tracy) | Non-album single |
