= Symbolyc One =

Music producer

- Also known as: S1
- Born: Larry Darnell Griffin Jr. August 3, 1976 (age 50); Waco, Texas, U.S.
- Genre: Hip hop
- Occupations: Record producer; rapper; songwriter
- Instruments: Vocals; keyboards; sampler; percussion; synthesizer
- Years active: 2004–present
- Labels: Roc Nation; GOOD; Om
- Member of: Strange Fruit Project; The Dividends
- Website: symbolycone.com

Larry Darnell Griffin Jr. (born August 3, 1976), known professionally as Symbolyc One (or S1), is an American record producer from Waco, Texas. He signed with Kanye West's GOOD Music as an in-house staffer on the label's Very GOOD Beats production wing by 2013. His production credits include West's 2010 single "Power", Beyoncé's 2011 single "Best Thing I Never Had", and 50 Cent's 2012 single "My Life"—each have peaked within the top 40 of the Billboard Hot 100. He has won three Grammy Awards throughout his career.

== Origin ==
Larry Darnell Griffin Jr. was born August 3, 1976, in Waco, Texas, and grew up there in a Christian household. In junior high school, he learned alto saxophone and played piano throughout his teen years, including for Sunday school at his local church. After forming a hip hop group in 2007 with his cousin, Myth, Griffin started making beats and producing recording. In 2010, he received his associate degree in audio engineering from McLennan Community College. From 2007-2008, S1 competed in national U.S. beat competitions such as iStandard, Red Bull Big Tune, and Sha Money's One Stop Shop.

== Music career ==
In his role as main producer of the group Strange Fruit Project, Griffin's style and production range includes R&B, soul, underground and urban/crossover pop. As a platinum-selling producer, S1 has worked with many musical artists, as well as being a core member in singer Erykah Badu’s electronic band The Cannabinoids.

Prominent collaborations include Kanye West's “Power” from the Grammy-winning album My Beautiful Dark Twisted Fantasy, and Beyoncé’s “Best Thing I Never Had” off her album 4, both tracks certified platinum. He appears on rap group Little Brothers second album The Minstrel Show in a skit as well. He also worked on West's Grammy-nominated albums Yeezus and Watch the Throne, a joint project with Jay-Z. As half of the duo The Dividends (with Dallas-based singer-songwriter Sarah Jaffe), Griffin co-wrote and co-produced the Eminem song "Bad Guy" from The Marshall Mathers LP 2, another Grammy-winning album. He also worked on the Madonna album Rebel Heart.

== Discography ==
Studio albums

- 2008: The Music Box

Collaboration albums

- 2005: The Art of Onemind (with Illmind)
- 2009: Cloud Nineteen (with Braille)
