= Dave East discography =

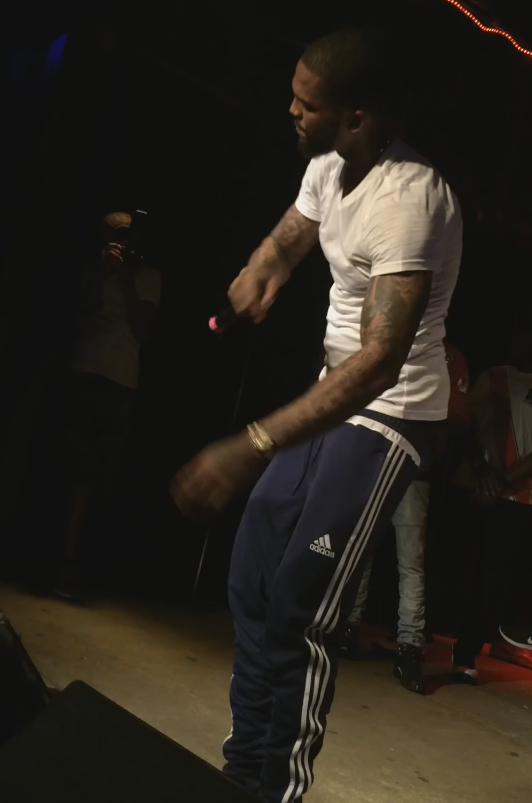
- East performing in June 2016
- Studio albums: 3
- EPs: 4
- Singles: 20
- Music videos: 5
- Mixtapes: 16
- Collaborative albums: 4

The discography of Dave East, an American rapper, consists of three studio albums, four collaborative studio albums, sixteen mixtapes, four extended plays (EP), and twenty singles (including thirteen as a featured artist).

== Albums ==
=== Studio albums ===
Title	Details	Peak chart positions		
Title	Details	US	US R&B/HH	CAN
Survival	Released: November 8, 2019; Label: Def Jam, Mass Appeal, From the Dirt; Format: Streaming, digital download	11	8	50
Fortune Favors the Bold	Released: July 14, 2023; Label: Def Jam; Format: Streaming, digital download			
Karma 4	Released: October 14, 2025; Label: From the Dirt; Format: Streaming, digital download			

=== Collaboration mixtapes ===
List of collaboration albums with release dates
Title	Details	Peak chart positions	
Title	Details	US	US R&B/HH
Beloved (with Styles P)	Released: October 5, 2018; Label: Def Jam Recordings, Mass Appeal; Format: Streaming, digital download	70	35
Hoffa (with Harry Fraud)	Released: July 30, 2021; Label: From the Dirt, SRFSCHL; Format: Streaming, digital download	137	—
Book of David (with Buda & Grandz & DJ Drama)	Released: November 18, 2022; Label: From the Dirt; Format: Streaming, digital download	—	—
30 For 30 (with Cruch Calhoun)	Released: November 30, 2023; Label: From the Dirt, ROSELLE USA, The Testing Room; Format: Streaming, digital download	—	—
FOR THE LOVE (with Scram Jones)	Released: February 19, 2024; Label: From the Dirt, BEAST MUSIC Inc.; Format: Streaming, digital download	-	-
APT 6E (with Mike & Keys)	Released: May 31, 2024; Label: From the Dirt; Format: Streaming, digital download	-	-
Living Proof (with araabMUZIK)	Released: November 15, 2024; Label: From the Dirt, Genre Defying Entertainment LLC; Format: Streaming, digital download	-	-
The Final Call (with Ransom)	Released: February 21, 2025; Label: From the Dirt, Momentum Entertainment LLC; Format: Streaming, digital download	-	-
Fine Dining (with Young Chris)	Released: June 20, 2025; Label: From the Dirt, CDR Records; Format: Streaming, digital download	-	-

=== Mixtapes ===
List of mixtapes, with release dates
Title	Released	Peak chart positions	
Title	Released	US	US R&B/HH
Change of Plans	July 15, 2010	—	—
American Greed	July 6, 2011	—	—
Don't Sleep	November 22, 2011	—	—
Insomnia	December 25, 2011	—	—
No Regrets	August 13, 2012	—	—
Gemini	April 15, 2013	—	—
I.A.T.S. (I Am The Streets)	August 28, 2013	—	—
Black Rose	July 22, 2014	—	—
Straight Outta Harlem	December 23, 2014	—	—
Hate Me Now	October 2, 2015	—	—
Kairi Chanel	September 30, 2016	38	3
Paranoia: A True Story	August 18, 2017	9	5
Karma (with DJ Holiday)	November 24, 2017	—	—
Paranoia 2	January 16, 2018	61	39
Karma 2	July 27, 2018	41	21
Karma 3	August 14, 2020	36	23
"—" denotes a recording that did not chart or was not released.

== EPs ==
List of extended plays with release dates
Title	Released
Born Broke, Die Rich (with KUR)	August 12, 2016
Survival Pacc	August 9, 2019
Pablo & Blanco (with Millyz)	May 21, 2021
HDIGH	March 11, 2022
2 Piece (with Harry Fraud)	April 17, 2024

== Singles ==
=== As lead artist ===
List of singles as a lead artist, showing year released and album name
Title	Year	Album
"Stretched Out"	2014	Non-album singles
"Winners Never Lose"	2015	Non-album singles
"All Summer"	2016	Non-album singles
"Paper Chasin" (featuring A$AP Ferg)	2017	Def Jam Presents: Direct Deposit, Vol. 2
"Perfect" (featuring Chris Brown)	2017	Paranoia: A True Story
"Alone" (featuring Jacquees)	2019	Survival
"Handsome"	2020	Karma 3

=== As featured artist ===
List of singles as a featured artist, showing year released and album name
Title	Year	Album
"A Pusher's Dream" (Al-Doe featuring Dave East)	2015	Non-album singles
"Diss Me" (Bitta Blood featuring Dave East)	2015	Non-album singles
"Be Good" (Lumidee featuring Dave East)	2015	Non-album singles
"Monvlisv" (C.I.T.Y. featuring Dave East)	2016	Non-album singles
"Grind for That" (Leeb Godchild featuring Dave East)	2016	The Chase
"Time Ticking" (Juelz Santana featuring Dave East, Rowdy Rebel, and Bobby Shmurda)	2017	The Get Back
"Realest Ones" (Skrilla Zoe featuring Dave East)	2017	Non-album singles
"Roll Up" (Greatness Jones featuring Dave East)	2017	Non-album singles
"Off the Porch" (C. Wells featuring Dave East)	2017	Before the Tour Bus
"Smoker's Section" (Faro tha Kid featuring Dave East and Pardison Fontaine)	2017	Non-album single
"I'm On 3.0" (Trae tha Truth featuring T.I., Dave East, Tee Grizzley, Royce da 5'9", Curren$y, Snoop Dogg, Fabolous, Rick Ross, G-Eazy, Styles P, and E-40)	2017	Tha Truth, Pt. 3
"Pink Eagle" (Juelz Santana featuring Dave East and Jim Jones)	2019	#FREESANTANA
"All or Nothin'" (J Stone featuring Dave East)	2020	The Definition of Pain
"Make Some Money"	2021	Snoop Dogg Presents Algorithm

== Guest appearances ==
List of guest appearances, with other performing artists, showing year released and album name
Title	Year	Other artist(s)	Album
"It's True"	2014	The Sparks Foundation, SayItAintTone, Rayven Justice	Forever Madness: The Randy Savage EP
"Scream"	2015	AD, Skeme	Blue:89
"MMM (Remix)"	2015	Cassidy, Fred Money, Vado, Red Café, Papoose, Maino, Uncle Murda, Fat Trel, Fred the Godson, Chubby Jag, Drag-On, J.R. Writer, Compton Menace	Don't Trust Anyone 3
"The Locker Room"	2015	Statik Selektah	Lucky 7
"Summertime Sadness"	2015	Fabolous	Summertime Shootout
"Everybody Say"	2015	Trey Songz, MIKExANGEL	To Whom It May Concern
"Welcome to NY"	2015	Styles P, Snype Life, Nino Man	A Wise Guy and a Wise Guy
"Slippin'"	2016	Meek Mill, Future	4/4 Part 2
"Headaches & Migraines"	2016	Mac Miller	Smoke Till I'm Dead
"My Skin"	2016	N.O.R.E., tweeZ	drunk uncle
"All My Life"	2016	Fat Trel	SDMG 2
"Hold Me Down"	2016	BJ the Chicago Kid	—N/a
"Body for My Zipcode"	2016	DJ Drama, Young Life, Freddie Gibbs	Quality Street Music 2
"Dave East Freestyle"	2016	Top Shelf Premium	Off Top Vol. 1
"Bag"	2016	—N/a	The Land (soundtrack)
"For the Family"	2016	Fabolous, Don Q	Summertime Shootout 2
"Limitless"	2016	Smoke DZA, Pete Rock	Don't Smoke Rock
"Wrote My Way Out"	2016	Nas, Lin-Manuel Miranda, Aloe Blacc	The Hamilton Mixtape
"Peace Sign"	2017	Sevyn Streeter	Girl Disrupted
"Olympian"	2017	A$AP Ferg	Still Striving
"East Coast (Remix)"	2017	A$AP Ferg, Frech Montana, A$AP Rocky, Dave East, Busta Rhymes	Still Striving
"Can I Live"	2017	Trina	The One
"Get out the Way"	2017	Jay Mula	Rockaway Ave
"Pictures"	2017	Berner, Styles P, Joe Ski	Vibes
"Era"	2018	PRhyme	PRhyme 2
"LTMH Pt.1"	2018	Red Café	Less Talk More Hustle
"NYCHA"	2018	Nas	Rapture (Netflix soundtrack)
"Rotation"	2018	Trey Songz	28
"Is U Down"	2019	Pvrx	3.14
"Taxin'"	2019	DJ Shadow	Our Pathetic Age
"Goodbye"	2019	Max B, Cam'ron	House Money
"Fuel"	2020	Berner, B-Real	Los Meros
"On God"	2020	R-Mean, Berner	The Warning
"96 Knicks"	2020	Smoke DZA	A Closed Mouth Don't Get Fed
"Hard Living"	2020	Statik Selektah, Method Man	The Balancing Act
"Live Like This"	2020	Kiing Shooter	Still Outside
"Blow That Shit"	2021	AZ	Doe or Die II
"Rent Money"	2022	Mary J. Blige	Good Morning Gorgeous
"Traffic"	2022	Lloyd Banks, Vado	Course of Inevitability
"Starlets"	2023	Giggs	Zero Tolerance
"Water to Wine"		Conway the Machine, Jozzy, Goosebytheway	Won't He Do it
