= Greatness Jones =

- Also known as: Emthree, Greatness, GJ
- Born: Charles Oluwafunsho Nnaji; 31 August 1990 (age 35)
- Origin: Hackney, London, England
- Genres: Hip hop, trap, R&B, electronic
- Occupations: Record producer, songwriter
- Years active: 2010–present
- Website: greatnessjones.com

Charles Oluwafunsho Nnaji (born 31 August 1990), better known by his stage name Greatness Jones, is a British record producer, composer and songwriter of Nigerian descent. He has worked with British hip-hop artists such as Giggs, Avelino, Scorcher and more.

== Background ==
Charles was born on 31 August 1990 in Hackney, London to Nigerian parents. His Mother is of the Yoruba and his father is of the Igbo ethnic group of Nigeria. His Mother came to the United Kingdom in the mid-1980s. He graduated from Cardinal Pole RC School in Hackney, London in 2006 and went to study Business and Information systems at University of Hertfordshire in 2008.

== Music career ==
Greatness Jones' production career began in the UK, where he worked with some of the most relevant artists in the music scene. It was on a vacation to New York City where he met a few up and coming and household name rappers such as Bynoe & Nas' Mass Appeal signee Dave East. After returning to the UK Greatness Jones maintained relationships he had established in New York City and started to send music to musicians he had met. As a result, songs produced by Greatness Jones started receiving radio play on stations such as Hot 97 & Power 105.1. He also landed a track on DJ Whoo Kid's 'The Elevation Vol. 2' Mixtape, track entitled 'Roll Up' by Dave East.

== Production style ==
Greatness uses the music production software Logic Pro along with custom plug-ins to make his beats. He usually produces space like mystic mellow beats which are distinguished by their hard-hitting sound and the use of heavy basslines, 808 kicks and sped up hi-hats.

== Discography ==
=== 2014 ===
PW – From London With Love

- 02 – Cause Me Pain

DJ Whoo Kid – The Elevation Vol. 2

- 13 – Roll Up – Dave East

Scorcher – 1 of 1

- 04 – Lord
- 07 – Smoking While We Drink

=== 2015 ===
Mark Asari – Good One Single

- 01 – Good One Ft. Giggs

=== 2016 ===
Bonkaz – Mixtape of The Year

- 05 – I Actually Freestyled This :)

Giggs – Landlord

- 05 – The Process

Avelino

- 01 – Late Nights in the 15
