= Street Symphony (producer) =

- Born: Torrance Esmond
- Origin: Memphis, Tennessee
- Occupations: Record producer, Music executive, Entrepreneur
- Years active: 2006−present
- Label: Track Or Die
- Website: trackordie.com

Torrance Esmond, better known by his stage name Street Symphony, is an American record producer and music executive from Memphis, Tennessee.

== Biography ==
Dividing his youth between Memphis and Nashville, Street Symphony was compelled to pursue a career in music after watching an Outkast concert. With roommates owning equipment, the Sean Combs-influenced entrepreneur began making beats by fiddling with the turntables and drum machines through the night in his Middle Tennessee State University dorm. At school, Street juggled prospects of a bountiful career in Electrical Engineering with his visions of music stardom. In the end, he switched majors, formed a notable area Hip-Hop group Player Way with best friends Mike Sean and Lonnel Matthews and went all in. Through performing at college parties, Street Symphony & Player Way garnered respect and fans on campus, as well as surrounding areas. People took notice, ranging from Street's early mentor Carlos "6 July" Broady, to NBA champion superstar Gary Payton, who signed the producer to his Rock Solid imprint in 2005. It was there that Street Symphony acquainted himself with big recording studios, honing his original sounding repertoire of beats with the likes of Yo Gotti and Starlito, who were flirting with a Cash Money Records deal. Overnight sessions, traveling, and a tireless hustle gave Street Symphony a director's chair in the action, as he refined his multi-genre, unique style of music.

Solidifying his presence in Tennessee, Street Symphony took interest in the Houston hustle. As artists like Paul Wall, Chamillionaire, and Mike Jones were reaching gold and platinum, Street remembered thinking, "Let me catch this wave." As he slept on his H-Town friend's floor, worked a day-job, and devoted off hours to his craft, he networked to shop his tracks to any artists he could reach. "In the evenings, I'd get out and hustle. I'd go to Guitar Center, in the DJ room, and play my beats so everyone could hear." Local artists took interest, as well as stars like Lil' Keke of the Screwed Up Click.

After finding success in Houston, Street Symphony followed Rap's next wave to Atlanta. It was there that he connected with Ludacris's label Disturbing tha Peace working with I-20, Dolla Boy of Playaz Circle & Luda himself. In 2009 he reconnected with friend and former college classmate, Lecrae. With a label, Reach Records behind him, Lecrae hoped to expand his audience and accessibility, attaching the touted-Christian Rap star with music that legitimized his careful message. First contributing to Lecrae's Rehab album, Street Symphony's knowledge and sound attracted his longtime friend and the Reach Records' brass to want him on board. As their flagship artist was kicking down mainstream doors, Street had a musical style and a Rolodex that functioned as a key to the industry's doors. In the subsequent two years, Street Symphony would handle artist and repertoire and executive production of Lecrae's music, especially surrounding his acclaimed Church Clothes mixtape series. In their time together, Lecrae garnered a Top 3 debut, as Street Symphony earned his first GMA Dove Award and Grammy Award, for 2012's Gravity. Continuing his success with Lecrae, Esmond returned to the 2015 GRAMMY Awards, winning as co-writer & producer for Best Christian Contemporary Music Performance/Song, "Messengers".

Following his achievements in the Christian Hip Hop subgenre with Lecrae, Street Symphony returned to the mainstream focusing on his Track Or Die production company. After affiliation from working together in The Playaz Circle days, 2 Chainz welcomed Street Symphony to the studio to assist in crafting the EP, Freebase—including video single "Trap Back." Additional frequent collaborators include: Yo Gotti, Starlito, Don Trip, Snootie Wild, and Tracy T.

== Track Or Die ==
After two years of working on staff as Vice President of A&R, he departed from Reach Records and in February 2014 launched his own label, publishing and mgmt company, Track Or Die.

Artists

- Moe The Natural
- Jacob Feltman

In-House Producers

- D.O. Speaks
- J Super
- Kangaroo
- Moe The Natural
- Tez Mania

Former

- Reconcile
- Tyshane aka Beam
- GNRA
- Spade Melo
- Ronnie Doe
- 8X8 Bocci

== Production credits ==
The following is a list of songs produced or co-produced by Street Symphony.

=== 2022 ===
Steven Malcolm - [Tree]

- 8. Red Light Green Light (featuring Jay-Way & Ty Brassel)
- 15. Glory On Me (featuring Childish Major & Taylor Hill)

DaniLeigh - [My Side]

- 2. Heartbreaker

=== 2021 ===
Steven Malcolm - [All Is True]

- 5. Glory On Me (featuring Childish Major & Taylor Hill)

=== 2020 ===
Yo Gotti - Untrapped

- 2. More Ready Than Ever

Jada Kingdom - Non Album Single

- 1. Green Dreams

=== 2019 ===
Raja Kumari - [Bloodline]

- 2. Karma

Raja Kumari - [Bloodline]

- 5. Born Hustla (feat. Janine The Machine)

Jacob Latimore - [Connection 2]

- 6. Mine (feat. Q Money)

Dave East - Survival

- 12. Everyday (featuring Gunna)

Yo Gotti - I Told U So (with DJ Drama)

- 14. Work Hard Play Hard (featuring Block Burnaz)

=== 2018 ===
Dave East - Paranoia 2

- 15. Grateful (featuring Marsha Ambrosius)

Saint Malo - Wild Wild West

- 4. Who Am I featuring Lester Shaw

Saint Malo - Wild Wild West

- A & R / Executive Producer

Nipsey Hussle - Victory Lap

- 7. Hussle & Motivate

Tiffany Foxx - Non Album Single

- 1. War Zone

Dave East - Karma 2

- 1. Imagine

=== 2017 ===
Starlito & Don Trip - Step Brothers 3

- 04. If My Girl Find Out
- 06. Me & You Both
- 09. The 13th Amendment Song
- 15. Untitled No Hook

DaBoyDame, Blac Youngsta & Mozzy - Can't Fake The Real

- 10. Get Whacked

David Banner - The God Box

- 02. Black Fist (featuring Tito Lopez)

Starlito - Hot Chicken

- 09. TBG (featuring Red Dot, West & Marty)
- 19. Outro

Meek Mill - Wins & Losses

- 13. - YBA (featuring The-Dream)
- 14. - Open (featuring Verse Simmonds)

Starlito - Non Album Single

- 01. You Should Be Proud

GNRA - Heartlines EP

- A & R / Executive Producer

Don Trip - Free Roy, Free Fletch

- 04. 10:04pm

Alphabet Rockers - Risen Shine #Woke

Rikki Blu - You Cant Make Me

- 07. Youth

Trav - QRAK (Queens Raised A King)

- 19. Bando (featuring Lil Durk)

=== 2016 ===
Wale - Non Album Single

- 01. PowerBall Freestyle

2 Chainz - Felt Like Cappin

- 05. Minding My Business

Yo Gotti - The Art of Hustle

- 09. Momma

Kris J - The A.R.T. Project

- 06. Follies

David Banner - Before The Box

- 02. Black Fist

Don Trip - The Head That Wears The Crown

- 06. Higher Learning

MMG - Priorities 4

- 17. Powerball Freestyle

Trav - Push 3

- 02. Its A Will Its A Way
- 21. We Living

G-Eazy - Non Album Single

- 01. So Much Better

Trina - Non Album Single

- 01. Overnight

Zoey Dollaz - October

- 01. Scammers (featuring Fat Trel)
- 06. U Can Be That (featuring Ink)

=== 2015 ===
Yo Gotti - Concealed (with DJ Drama)

- 03. Super Power

Neek Bucks - Here For A Reason 2

- 05. How Can I (featuring Kevin Gates)

Plane Jaymes - Vape Music Vol 1

- 06. Align

Starlito - Introversion

- 18. It's OK (featuring Robin Raynelle)
- 20. 10,000 Hours

Rikki Blu - Non Album Single

- 01. Holy Vices

Don Trip - GodSpeed

- 07. Get Away (featuring Singa B)
- 17. Losing Streak

2 Chainz - Trap-A-Velli Tre

- 09. Halo (Letter From My Unborn Son)

Tracy T - 50 Shades of Green

- 15. Hard Way (featuring MeetSims)

Reconcile - Catchin' Bodies EP

- A & R / Executive Producer

Blac Youngsta - I Swear To God

- 10. Codeine

Yo Gotti - CM8

- 6. No Mo

=== 2014 ===
Don Trip - Randy Savage

- 04. Road Warriors (featuring Starlito)
- 07. Cream of the Crop
- 08. Neil Armstrong

2 Chainz - Freebase

- 01. Trap Back

Tracy T - The Wolf of All Streets

- 14. Save Me

Lecrae - Anomaly

- A&R
- 01. Outsiders
- 15. Messengers (featuring For King & Country)

Wave Chapelle - Only The Beginning

- 05. I Want It All

Snootie Wild - Go Mode

- 01. Here I Go (featuring Starlito)

Scotty - Spaghetti Junction

- 10. Long Day 2ma
- 15. Stealing Shit

Starlito - Black Sheep Don't Grin

- 10. She Just Want The Money (featuring Don Trip, Petty & WILX)
- 12. No Rearview TWO (featuring Don Trip and Yo Gotti)

=== 2013 ===
Andy Mineo - Heroes for Sale

- 13. Curious
- 15. Tug Of War (featuring Krizz Kaliko)

Scotty - F.A.I.T.H. (Forever Atlanta In The Heart)

- 17. Fuss And Fight (featuring Lecrae)

Derek Minor - Minorville

- 02. In God We Trust featuring Thi'sl)
- 12. Dear Mr. Christian (featuring Dee-1 and Lecrae)

Starlito & Don Trip - Step Brothers 2

- 01. Paper, Rock, Scissors

Lecrae - Church Clothes 2

- A & R / Executive Producer
- 01. Co-Sign pt. 2
- 02. Believe
- 07. Sell Out
- 15. My Whole Life Changed
- 17. Hang On

=== 2012 ===
Json - Growing Pains

- 02. Making Me Over (featuring Pastor AD3 and Tedashii)

Swoope - Wake Up

- 04. Schizo (featuring Tedashii)

Lecrae - Church Clothes

- A & R / Executive Producer
- 01. Co-Sign
- 04. Cold World (featuring Tasha Catour)
- 12. No Regrets (featuring Suzy Rock)

KB - Weight & Glory

- 04. Don't Mean Much (featuring Sho Baraka and Mitch Parks from After Edmund)

Canon - Non Album Single

- 01. Work

Alex Faith - Honest 2 God

- 04. Georgia Clay (featuring JAMM)

Lecrae - Gravity

- A & R / Executive Producer
- 01. The Drop (Intro)
- 06. Fakin (featuring Thi'sl)
- 10. Buttons
- 12. Lord Have Mercy (featuring Tedashii)
- 14. Tell The World (featuring Mali Music)

=== 2011 ===
Lecrae - Rehab: The Overdose

- 01. Overdose
- 05. Blow Your High (featuring Canon)

Trina - Diamonds Are Forever

- 10. Waist So Skinny (featuring Rick Ross)

Tedashii - Blacklight

- 09. Go Until I'm Gone (featuring Thi'sl)

Thi'sl - Beautiful Monster

- 08. My Radio On Drugs
- 11. It's Not About Me (featuring Pettidee)

=== 2010 ===
I-20 - Non Album Single

- 01. Down Chic (featuring Devin the Dude and Lil Keke)

Arab - The Package

- 07. Go
- 09. 31st Floor

Dolla Boy of Playaz Circle - It's Official

- 15. Oxygen (featuring J. Hard)

Lecrae - Rehab

- 09. New Shalom (featuring Derek Minor)

Starlito - Starlito's Way 3: Life Insurance

- 03. SW3

=== 2009 ===
Lil Scrappy - Non Album Single

- 01. Look Like This (featuring Gucci Mane)

Clyde Carson - Bass Rock

- 02. Popular Thugs (featuring The Jacka)

B.G. - Built To Last 1.5

- 14. Gotta Get My Money (Remix) (featuring Gorilla Zoe, Yung LA, Bun B, TC and Lady Dolla]

Starlito - I Love You, Too Much: The Necessary Evils

- 08. I Don't Believe Her

Starlito - The Tenn-A-Keyan 3

- 21. Grind Hard Cypher

== Awards and achievements ==
- 43rd Annual GMA Dove Awards (2012) - Awarded Rap/Hip Hop Album of the Year
- 44th Annual GMA Dove Awards (2013) - Awarded Rap/Hip Hop Song of the Year
- 44th Annual GMA Dove Awards (2013) - Awarded Rap/Hip Hop Album of the Year
- 46th Annual GMA Dove Awards (2015) - Awarded Rap/Hip Hop Album of the Year
- 50th Annual Grammy Awards - Nominated for Best Contemporary R&B Album
- 51st Annual Grammy Awards - Nominated for Best R&B Song
- 51st Annual Grammy Awards - Nominated for Best Female R&B Vocal Performance
- 55th Annual Grammy Awards - Awarded Best Gospel Album
- 57th Annual Grammy Awards - Awarded for Best Contemporary Christian Music Performance/Song
- 60th Annual Grammy Awards - Nominated for Best Children's Album
- 61st Annual Grammy Awards - Nominated for Best Rap Album
- 62nd Annual Grammy Awards - Nominated for Best Children's Album
