= Home? =

Studio album by Wretch 32
- Released: 2 May 2025
- Length: 52:59
- Label: AWAL
- Producer: 2 Fvded; Crumz; Era the Kid; Greatness Jones; The J.F.L.O.W.S.; Jungo; Juls; Donna Lugassy; Maestro the Baker; Major Music; Pantha; Tremaines; TSB; WavsDntDie; Jerome Williams

Wretch 32 chronology
Upon Reflection (2019)	Home? (2025)

Home? is the seventh studio album by British rapper Wretch 32. It was released on 2 May 2025, by AWAL.

Incorporating elements of afrobeat, R&B, reggae, and garage, Home? is the first project in four years by Wretch 32, since little BIG Man in 2021. It consists of fifteen songs, mostly ranging between two and four minutes, with a total runtime of approximately fifty-three minutes. The album features several collaborators including Skip Marley.

== Reception ==
Professional ratings
Review scores
Source	Rating
Clash	8/10
MusicOMH	4/5 stars
NME	5/5 stars
Rolling Stone UK	4/5 stars
The Telegraph	4/5 stars

Fred Garratt-Stanley of Rolling Stone UK rated the album four stars, stating "this album is a piece of social documentation that stretches back generations in its attempts to understand our current reality."

NME's Kyann-Sian Williams gave the album a rating of five out of five and referring to it as "a testament to the strength of roots that refuse to wither and a promise that – no matter where you are in the world – you can always find a piece of home in this record."

Ben Devlin of MusicOMH assigned it a rating of four stars out of five, noting "The ambition of Home? is admirable, and Wretch 32 delivers his best album yet by centering the music around these weighty themes."

Clash's Finlay Harrison rated it eight out of ten, describing the album as a "mature, delicately crafted, and wisely put-together project that speaks of love, growth and family."

Rating Home? four out of five, The Telegraph's Neil McCormick noted, "A sense of political frustration bubbles throughout. Yet it's not a heavy album, there's joy in the Caribbean, African and British blend, with sing-along melodies and danceable rhythms."

== Track listing ==
Home? track listing
No.	Title	Writer(s)	Producer(s)	Length
1.	"Transitional Chapter"	Jermaine Scott; Charles Nnaji	Greatness Jones; Maestro the Baker	3:41
2.	"Seven Seater" (with Mercston and Ghetts)	Scott; Mateo Louisa; Aaron Marston; Stewart Reid; Justin Clarke-Samuel	2 Fvded	3:51
3.	"Like Home" (featuring Teni)	Scott; Teniola Apata; Malik Venna; Dex Winful	Major Music	3:18
4.	"Nesta Marley" (with Skip Marley)	Scott; Aaron Cowan; Skip Marley	Pantha	4:22
5.	"Bridge is Burning" (with Protoje)	Scott; Cowan; Oje Ollivierre	Pantha	2:57
6.	"Me & Mine" (with WSTRN)	Scott; Ras Alexander; Louisa; Louis Rei; Reid; Michelin Shin	2 Fvded	3:05
7.	"Home Sweet Home" (with Kano)	Scott; Kane Robinson; Jerome Williams	J. Williams; WavsDntDie	4:08
8.	"Home is Where the Heart is Interlude"	Scott; Jason Blake; Bryan Moon; Tremaine Sandhu	Crumz; Jungo; Tremaines	0:29
9.	"Black and British" (featuring Little Simz and Benjamin A.D)	Scott; Simbiatu Ajikawo; J. Williams; Benjamin Williams	WavsDntDie	4:21
10.	"Windrush" (with Cashh)	Scott; Jay Hippolyte; Cashief Nichols	The J.F.L.O.W.S.	3:21
11.	"Little Things" (with Angel)	Scott; Sirach Charles; J. Williams	Williams; WavsDntDie	2:50
12.	"Peace & Love" (with Skrapz)	Scott; Julian Nicco-Annan; Christopher Kyei	Juls	3:52
13.	"God's Work" (with AV Allure)	Scott; Aaron Evans; Donna Lugassy; J. Williams	Lugassy; J. Williams; WavsDntDie	2:56
14.	"Close to Home / Nino SLG Interlude" (with Nino SLG)	Scott; Elijah Aduu; Callum Waddington	Era the Kid	0:57
15.	"Feels" (with Tiggs Da Author)	Scott; Oluwajare Oladigbolu; Ikeoluwa OluwaTobi; Adam Simon	TSB	4:29
Total length:				52:59
