= Bynoe =

Bynoe is a surname. Notable people with the surname include:

- Benjamin Bynoe (1804–1865), naval surgeon on HMS Beagle with Charles Darwin
- Hilda Bynoe (1921–2013), Governor of Grenada
- Peter Bynoe (born 1951), American lawyer and businessman
- Philip Bynoe, American musician
- Robin Bynoe (born 1941), West Indian cricketer from Barbados
- Bynoe (born 1984), American rapper from Far Rockaway, New York

== See also ==
- Acacia bynoeana, known colloquially as Bynoe's wattle, a species of Acacia native to eastern Australia
- Heteronotia binoei, commonly known as Bynoe's gecko, a species of lizard endemic to Australia
- Bynoe, Northern Territory, a locality
