= The Emperor's New Clothes (Raekwon album) =

Studio album by Raekwon
- Released: July 18, 2025
- Genre: Hip-hop
- Length: 40:32
- Labels: Ice H20; Mass Appeal
- Producers: Amadeus; Calvin Ewings; Frank G.; J.U.S.T.I.C.E. League; Nottz; Pav Bundy; Raekwon; Roads-Art; Snipe Beatz; STLNDRMS; Swizz Beatz; Trilogy; Wyldfyer the TRUTH

Raekwon chronology
The Wild (2017)	The Emperor's New Clothes (2025)

Legend Has It... chronology
Victory (2025)	The Emperor's New Clothes (2025)	Supreme Clientele 2 (2025)

The Emperor's New Clothes is the eighth studio album by American rapper Raekwon. It was released on July 18, 2025 by Ice H20 Records and Mass Appeal Records. It is the first album Raekwon released in 8 years after The Wild in 2017. It is the second album released in Mass Appeal’s “Legend Has It…” series of albums released in 2025.

== Background ==
On April 16, 2025, Mass Appeal Records announced a series titled Legend Has It..., which features seven albums set to be released in 2025, from Nas & DJ Premier, Ghostface Killah, Raekwon himself, Mobb Deep, De La Soul, Big L, and Slick Rick.

== Critical reception ==
Professional ratings
Aggregate scores
Source	Rating
Metacritic	63/100
Review scores
Source	Rating
Clash	5/10
Pitchfork	6.0/10
Rolling Stone	3.5/5 stars
Slant Magazine	2.5/5 stars

According to the review aggregator Metacritic, The Emperor's New Clothes received "generally favorable reviews" based on a weighted average score of 63 out of 100 from 4 critic scores.

== Track listing ==
The Emperor's New Clothes track listing
No.	Title	Writer(s)	Producer(s)	Length
1.	"Intro"	Corey Woods	Raekwon	0:35
2.	"Bear Hill"	Woods	Frank G.	2:24
3.	"Pomogranite" (featuring Inspectah Deck and Carlton Fisk)	Woods; Jason S Hunter; Carlton Fisk	Amadeus; Trilogy	3:20
4.	"Veterans Only Billionaire Rehab (Skit)"	Woods	Raekwon	1:04
5.	"Wild Corsicans" (featuring Westside Gunn, Conway the Machine, and Benny the Butcher)	Woods; Alvin Lamar Worthy; Demond Price; Jeremie Damon Pennick	Snipe Beatz	3:43
6.	"1 Life" (featuring Stacy Barthe)	Woods; Stacy Barthe	J.U.S.T.I.C.E. League	4:19
7.	"Barber Shop Bullies (Skit)"	Woods	Roads-Art; STLNDRMS	0:28
8.	"Open Doors" (featuring Tommy Nova)	Woods; Tommy Nova	Roads-Art	2:53
9.	"600 School" (featuring Ghostface Killah and Method Man)	Woods; Dennis David Coles; Clifford Smith Jr.	Swizz Beatz	3:12
10.	"The Guy That Plans It"	Woods	Roads-Art	1:32
11.	"Da Heavies"	Woods	Pav Bundy	2:26
12.	"Officer Full Beard (Skit)"	Woods	Roads-Art	1:01
13.	"The Omerta" (featuring Nas)	Woods; Nasir Jones	Nottz	3:18
14.	"Get Outta Here" (featuring Ghostface Killah)	Woods; Coles	Frank G.	2:48
15.	"The Sober Dose Gift (Skit)"	Woods	Roads-Art	0:56
16.	"Debra Night Wine" (featuring Marsha Ambrosius)	Woods; Marsha Ambrosius	Wyldfyer the TRUTH	3:20
17.	"Mac & Lobster" (featuring Ghostface Killah)	Woods; Coles	Frank G.; Roads-Art	3:13
Total length:				40:32

== Charts ==
Chart performance for The Emperor's New Clothes
Chart (2025)	Peak position
UK Album Downloads (Official Charts)	47
UK R&B Albums (Official Charts)	20
