= Kairi Chanel =

Mixtape by Dave East
- Released: September 30, 2016
- Recorded: 2015–2016
- Genre: Hip hop
- Length: 63:59
- Label: Mass Appeal
- Producer: Cardo; Mr. Authentic; Rich Icy; Money Montage; Buda & Grandz; Phonix Beats; Tha Jerm; Mark Henry; Cashflo; Triple A

Dave East chronology
| Hate Me Now (2015) | Kairi Chanel (2016) | Paranoia: A True Story (2017) |

Kairi Chanel is the tenth mixtape by American hip hop recording artist Dave East. It was released on September 30, 2016, by Mass Appeal Records. The mixtape features guest appearances from 2 Chainz, Sevyn Streeter, Fabolous, Cam'ron, Beanie Sigel, Jazzy Amra and The Game. Kairi Chanel was named after East's daughter.

== Background and release ==
On September 16, 2016, Dave East announced the mixtape's release date, also sharing the track listing and the artwork. On September 29, East appeared on Power 105.1's The Breakfast Club, where he announced that he has signed a deal with Def Jam Recordings. He released Kairi Chanel on the next day. While talking about the mixtape in an interview with Billboard, East said;

[Kairi Chanel] I feel is my best work to date. I named it after my daughter, because she’s the greatest and most defining moment of my life. Everything I’ve done up until now has led me to her, so I translated that into music.

== Promotion ==
On September 16, 2016, a music video directed by Fred Focus was released for the track "Keisha". On October 11, 2016, East released a music video for the track "Type of Time", which was directed by Fred Focus. On January 11, 2017, the music video for "30 Niggaz" was released. On January 30, 2017, East released the Joe Puma-directed music video for "It Was Written".

== Track listing ==
| No. | Title | Producer(s) | Length |
|---|---|---|---|
| 1. | "Kairi Chanel" | Mr. Authentic | 4:12 |
| 2. | "Type of Time" | Cardo | 5:56 |
| 3. | "Again" | Rich Icy; Money Montage | 3:29 |
| 4. | "Can't Ignore" (featuring 2 Chainz) | 2 Chainz | 4:10 |
| 5. | "From the Heart" (featuring Sevyn Streeter) | Ty Dolla Sign; Buda & Grandz | 4:11 |
| 6. | "30 Niggaz" | Buda & Grandz | 4:44 |
| 7. | "Keisha" | Mr. Authentic | 4:23 |
| 8. | "Eyes on Me" (featuring Jahlil Beats and Fabolous) | Jahlil Beats | 6:23 |
| 9. | "S.D.E." (featuring Cam'ron) | Mr. Authentic | 3:40 |
| 10. | "Don Pablo" | Tha Jerm | 2:22 |
| 11. | "The Only Thing" | Mark Henry | 3:43 |
| 12. | "The Real Is Back" (featuring Beanie Sigel) | Beanie Sigel | 4:24 |
| 13. | "Different Ways" | Nas | 4:08 |
| 14. | "Don't Shoot" | Triple A | 4:00 |

Apple Music and iTunes bonus track
| No. | Title | Producer(s) | Length |
|---|---|---|---|
| 15. | "Bad Boy on Death Row" (featuring The Game) | Buda & Grandz; Drumz & Rosez | 4:26 |

== Charts ==
| Chart (2016) | Peak position |
|---|---|
| US Billboard 200 | 38 |
| US Top R&B/Hip-Hop Albums (Billboard) | 3 |
