= Mass Appeal Records =

American record label

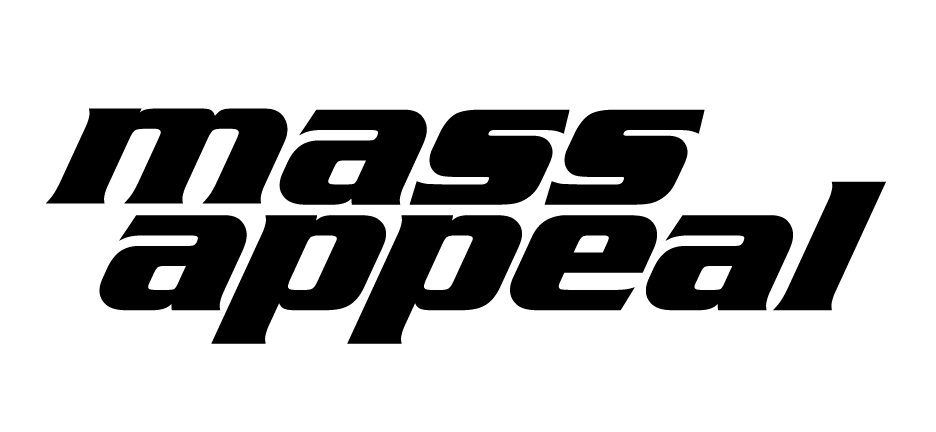
- Founded: 2014
- Founder: Nasir "Nas" Jones; Peter Bittenbender
- Status: Active
- Distributors: Def Jam (2018–2020); The Orchard (2021–present)
- Genre: Hip-hop
- Country of origin: United States
- Location: New York City
- Official website: Official website

Mass Appeal Records is an American independent record label founded in 2014. The label is the music division of the Mass Appeal Media Group. In May 2014, it was announced that American rapper Nas was launching an indie label with Mass Appeal with Peter Bittenbender of company Decon.

Since its inception, the label has put out releases including the singles "Old English” from Young Thug, Freddie Gibbs, and ASAP Ferg, as well as Jay Electronica's "Exhibit C"; albums such as Fashawn's The Ecology, Pimp C's Long Live the Pimp, and J Dilla's The Diary, and mixtapes, such as Dave East's Hate Me Now.

== History ==
On October 24, 2014, the label released Run the Jewels album Run the Jewels 2. The album was crowned as number-one album of the year by Pitchfork, Stereogum and Spin and number-two hip-hop album of the year by Rolling Stone. In 2015, Marvel Comics released comic book covers inspired by Run the Jewels.

Following his signing with Mass Appeal, Fashawn released his long-awaited second album The Ecology on February 24, 2015. The album featured guest appearances by Nas, Aloe Blacc, Dom Kennedy, and more.

Mass Appeal Records released The Mountain Will Fall, the fifth studio album by DJ Shadow on June 24, 2016. It was his first studio album since 2011's The Less You Know, the Better. The album was ranked at number one on Top Dance/Electronic Albums at Billboard.

On December 4, 2015, the label released Pimp C's fifth album, the posthumous Long Live the Pimp. The following year, on April 15, 2016, the label released J Dilla's vocal album The Diary. The album was ranked at number two on Pitchfork's list of "Most Promising" releases of Record Store Day 2016. NPR included "Fuck the Police" in their Songs We Love segment. Mass Appeal released Rubble Kings: The Album on January 15, 2016.

J Dilla's The Diary was released through Mass Appeal on April 15, 2016. DJ Shadow released The Mountain Will Fall on June 24, 2016. Mass Appeal released The Land (Music from the Motion Picture) on July 29, 2016. Dave East released Kairi Chanel on September 30, 2016. Boldy James released The Art of Rock Climbing on January 27, 2017, and House of Blues on February 24, 2017. Fashawn released Manna on August 11, 2017. Dave East released Paranoia: A True Story on August 18, 2017. Ezri released be right back on October 5, 2017. Dave East released Paranoia 2 on January 16, 2018. Black Milk released Fever on February 23, 2018. In May 2017, Mass Appeal announced a joint venture publishing company with Pulse Music Group. In June 2018, a new partnership with Universal Music Group was announced with the companies entering into a multi-year global agreement.

On June 15, 2018, Nas released his twelfth studio album Nasir, through Mass Appeal Records and Def Jam Recordings. It succeeds Nas' album Life Is Good, released six years prior in 2012. The album was a part of the GOOD Music 7-song, 5-album rollout executive produced by Kanye West, featuring appearances from Kanye West, Puff Daddy, 070 Shake, Tony Williams, and The-Dream. Nasir debuted at number five on the US Billboard 200 with 77,000 album-equivalent units, of which 49,000 were pure album sales. It serves as Nas's twelfth top-ten album in the United States.

In August 2018, Cantrell released his debut EP Stardust 2 Angels. The project was accompanied by a Mass Appeal-produced documentary available via YouTube, entitled, "Stardust 2: Cantrell on Skating, New Album and Albany, GA | Mass Appeal".

Mass Appeal artist Stro released his debut project, Nice 2 Meet You, Again on October 19, 2018. The EP has one feature by Mannywellz. Cuz Lightyear released Blue Slime on November 30, 2018, featuring rappers Lil Baby, Killer Mike, and Yung Bans. Mass Appeal's resident punk band, The 1865, released Don't Tread On We! on January 25, 2019. The 1865 has four members: Mass Appeal's own director, Sacha Jenkins, alongside Carolyn "Honeychild" Coleman, Flora Lucini, Chuck Treece, and Jason "Biz" Lucas. The label then released a compilation album called the Starting 5: Vol. 1 on February 5, 2019, with features from Nas, Black Milk, and Liana Bank$. The project had an accompanying tour during rollout, The Starting 5 Tour, with artists Ezri, Stro, Fashawn, Cantrell, and 070 Phi. In August 2019, it launched Mass Appeal India, jointly with Universal Music Group, to promote India’s burgeoning hip-hop culture on a global scale. Indian rapper Divine was the first signee of the label.

On April 16, 2025, Mass Appeal Records announced a series of seven albums titled Legend Has It..., from Nas & DJ Premier, Ghostface Killah, Raekwon, Mobb Deep, De La Soul, Big L, plus one "guest of honour", which later turned out to be Slick Rick. Four albums have been released in 2025. Slick Rick's Victory was released June 13, 2025. Raekwon's The Emperor's New Clothes was released July 18, 2025. Supreme Clientele 2 by Ghostface Killah was released August 22, 2025. Mobb Deep's Infinite was released October 10, 2025.

== Notable artists ==
=== Current ===
- Nas
- AP Dhillon
- Dave East
- DJ Premier
- Erick the Architect
- Ghostface Killah
- Raekwon
- Slick Rick
- Mobb Deep
- De La Soul
- Shinda Kahlon

=== Former ===
- Pimp C (deceased before label's foundation, released his most recent posthumous album Long Live the Pimp)
- Bishop Nehru (currently self-releasing through Nehruvia LLC)
- Danity Kane
- Run the Jewels (currently signed to RBC/BMG)
- Kiing Shooter (deceased)
- Boldy James (currently signed to Griselda Records)

== Discography ==
Year	Date	Artist	Album	Notes
2014	October 24	Run the Jewels	Run the Jewels 2	
2014	December 9	Various artists	The Music of Grand Theft Auto V	
2015	February 24	Fashawn	The Ecology	
2015	February 27	Boldy James	Trapper's Alley 2	
2015	April 21	The Alchemist and Oh No	Welcome to Los Santos	
2015	August 7	Gangrene	You Disgust Me	
2015	September 25	Run the Jewels	Meow the Jewels	
2015	October 1	Dave East	Hate Me Now	
2015	December 4	Pimp C	Long Live the Pimp	Posthumous release
2016	January 15	Various artists	Rubble Kings: The Album	
2016	April 15	J Dilla	The Diary	Posthumous release
2016	June 24	DJ Shadow	The Mountain Will Fall	
2016	July 29	Various artists	The Land (Music from the Motion Picture)	
2016	September 30	Dave East	Kairi Chanel	
2017	January 27	Boldy James	The Art of Rock Climbing	
2017	February 24	Boldy James	House of Blues	
2017	August 11	Fashawn	Manna	
2017	August 18	Dave East	Paranoia: A True Story	
2017	September 22	Cuz Lightyear	WHAT UP CUZ	
2017	October 5	Ezri	be right back	
2017	November 24	Dave East	Karma	
2018	January 16	Dave East	Paranoia 2	
2018	February 23	Black Milk	Fever	
2018	June 15	Nas	Nasir	
2018	July 27	Dave East	Karma 2	
2018	July 27	N.O.R.E.	5E	
2018	August 24	Cantrell	Stardust 2 Angels	
2018	October 5	Dave East and Styles P	Beloved	
2018	October 19	Stro	Nice 2 Meet You, Again	
2018	November 30	Cuz Lightyear	BLUE SLIME	
2019	January 25	The 1865	Don't Tread On We!	
2019	February 5	Mass Appeal	Starting 5: Vol. 1	
2019	March 22	Cantrell	Devil Never Even Lived	
2019	April 26	atm	atm	
2019	July 19	Nas	The Lost Tapes 2	
2019	November 8	Dave East	Survival	
2019	November 15	DJ Shadow	Our Pathetic Age	
2020	February 2	070 Phi	My Father's Gun	
2020	August 14	Dave East	Karma 3	
2020	August 21	Nas	King's Disease	
2021	August 6	Nas	King's Disease II	
2021	September 7	Jozyhur	Jozyhur	
2021	December 24	Nas	Magic	
2022	July 15	DJ Premier	Hip Hop 50: Vol. 1	
2022	November 11	Nas	King's Disease III	
2023	July 21	Nas	Magic 2	
2023	September 14	Nas	Magic 3	
2023	November 30	ThirumaLi, FEJO, Dabzee and ThudWiser	Sambar	Distributed by Mass Appeal India (Def Jam Records India)
2024	March 7	ThirumaLi and Jay Stellar	Legacy	Exclusively Distributed by Mass Appeal India
2024	May 10	Ghostface Killah	Set the Tone (Guns & Roses)	
2025 (Legend Has It...)	June 13	Slick Rick	Victory	
2025 (Legend Has It...)	July 18	Raekwon	The Emperor's New Clothes	
2025 (Legend Has It...)	August 22	Ghostface Killah	Supreme Clientele 2	
2025 (Legend Has It...)	October 10	Mobb Deep	Infinite	Posthumous release for (Prodigy, Big L, and Trugoy the Dove)
2025 (Legend Has It...)	October 31	Big L	Harlem's Finest: Return of the King	Posthumous release for (Prodigy, Big L, and Trugoy the Dove)
2025 (Legend Has It...)	November 21	De La Soul	Cabin in the Sky	Posthumous release for (Prodigy, Big L, and Trugoy the Dove)
2025 (Legend Has It...)	December 12	Nas and DJ Premier	Light-Years	
2026	October 23	Anderson .Paak & Cordae	Heavy Is the Crown	
2026	November 13	Westside Gunn	HEELMATIC	

== See also ==
- Mass Appeal Magazine
- Mass Appeal India
- Ill Will Records
- Decon Records
