= The Wild (Raekwon album) =

Studio album by Raekwon
- Released: March 24, 2017
- Recorded: 2015–2017
- Genre: Hip-hop
- Length: 43:04
- Labels: Ice H20; Empire
- Producers: Dame Grease; Dan the Band; Frank G.; G Sparkz; J. Dot; J.U.S.T.I.C.E. League; Mally the Martian; Mark Henry; RoadsArt; Xtreme; MK Beats

Raekwon chronology
Fly International Luxurious Art (2015)	The Wild (2017)	The Emperor's New Clothes (2025)

Wu-Tang Clan solo chronology
The Pillage 2 (2015)	The Wild (2017)	Loyalty Is Royalty (2017)

The Wild is the seventh solo studio album by American rapper Raekwon. It was released on March 24, 2017, through Ice H20 Records and Empire Distribution. Production was handled by RoadsArt, Frank G., Dame Grease, G'Sparkz, J. Dot, J.U.S.T.I.C.E. League, Mally the Martian, Mark Henry and Xtreme, with MK Beats serving as co-producer. It features guest appearances from Andra Day, CeeLo Green, G-Eazy, Lil' Wayne and P.U.R.E.

The album peaked at number 88 on the Billboard 200, number 41 on the Top R&B/Hip-Hop Albums and number 5 on the Independent Albums charts in the United States.

== Critical reception ==
Professional ratings
Aggregate scores
Source	Rating
Metacritic	80/100
Review scores
Source	Rating
Albumism	3.5/5 stars
AllMusic	3.5/5 stars
Clash	7/10
Consequence of Sound	B+
Exclaim!	8/10
HipHopDX	4.3/5
The Observer	4/5 stars
Pitchfork	7.4/10
RapReviews	6.5/10

The Wild was met with generally favorable reviews from music critics. At Metacritic, which assigns a normalized rating out of 100 to reviews from mainstream publications, the album received an average score of 80 based on seven reviews.

William Ketchum III of HipHopDX praised the album, claiming that "with The Wild, Raekwon firmly grabs another trophy for the squad while continuing to pad his own hall of fame legacy in the process". TJ Kliebhan of Consequence called it "a worthy addition to Raekwon's extensive discography and should comfortably take a position near the top of most fans' lists". Riley Wallace of Exclaim! wrote: "while more uptempo than his fans may have been comfortable with in the past, the project has a noticeable sense of growth and maturity about it. Coupled with incredible production, The Wild reaffirms why Raekwon's been so revered all these years". Phil Mongredien of The Observer called it "a welcome return to form". Matthew Ismael Ruiz of Pitchfork wrote: "a quick glance at a recent list of his favorite hip-hop records of all-time--rooted firmly in the golden and silver ages of hip-hop--reveals what inspires him most. When Raekwon leans into those sounds and themes, the rhymes that flow through him are evidence that this OG can still hang with the best of them". AllMusic's Andy Kellman noted: "tmajority of the verses are, however, devoted to street survivalism. The more combative, the better". Hugh Leask of Clash resumed that the album "offers solid proof that rappers in their middle ages are far from a spent force".

== Track listing ==
No.	Title	Writer(s)	Producer(s)	Length
1.	"The Wild" (Intro)	Corey Woods; Robert Bonnell	RoadsArt	1:47
2.	"This Is What It Comes Too"	Woods; Vernon Brown	Xtreme	2:47
3.	"Nothing"	Woods; Frank Guastella	Frank G	2:58
4.	"Skit" (Bang Head Right)			0:55
5.	"Marvin" (featuring CeeLo Green)	Woods; Thomas Callaway; Guastella	Frank G	4:06
6.	"Can't You See"	Woods; Bonnell	RoadsArt	3:13
7.	"My Corner" (featuring Lil' Wayne)	Woods; Dwayne Carter; Gregorio Ford	G Sparkz	4:29
8.	"Skit" (Fuck You Up Card)			0:53
9.	"M&N" (featuring P.U.R.E.)	Woods; Reginald Cross; Damon Blackman	Dame Grease	2:20
10.	"Visiting Hour" (featuring Andra Day)	Woods; Cassandra Batie; Dwight Brandon; Daniel Policar; Herb Rooney	Mally the Martian; Dan the Band	3:17
11.	"Skit" (Bang Fall Down)			0:34
12.	"The Reign"	Woods; Mark Henry; Marcus Brian	Mark Henry; MK Beatz^{[a]}	4:49
13.	"Crown of Thorns"	Woods; J. Dot	J-Dot	3:10
14.	"Purple Brick Road" (featuring G-Eazy)	Woods; Gerald Gillum; Tiffany Giardina; Erik Ortiz; Kevin Crowe; Kenneth Bartolomei	J.U.S.T.I.C.E. League	4:00
15.	"You Hear Me"	Woods; Bonnell	RoadsArt	2:21
16.	"Bang Outro"			1:25
Total length:				43:04

Notes

- ^{^[a]} signifies a co-producer

== Charts ==
Chart (2017)	Peak position
US Billboard 200	88
US Top R&B/Hip-Hop Albums (Billboard)	41
US Independent Albums (Billboard)	5
