= Supreme Clientele 2 =

Studio album by Ghostface Killah
- Released: August 22, 2025
- Recorded: 2003 (Note: The album's seventeenth track, "Metaphysics", was recorded in 2003.); 2025
- Genre: Hip-hop
- Length: 48:27
- Label: Mass Appeal
- Producers: 4th Disciple; BackpackBeatz; Chedda Bang; Danny Caiazzo; DUF; EZ Elpee; Ghostface Killah; Lenny Green; J Black; Metaphysics; Mr. Commodore; Redman; RoadsArt; Ray Ray Scavo III; Scram Jones; Sean C & LV

Ghostface Killah chronology
Set the Tone (Guns & Roses) (2024)	Supreme Clientele 2 (2025)

Legend Has It... chronology
The Emperor's New Clothes (2025)	Supreme Clientele 2 (2025)	Infinite (2025)

Singles from Supreme Clientele 2
- 1. "Rap Kingpin" Released: July 31, 2025; 2. "Metaphysics" Released: August 16, 2025

Supreme Clientele 2 is the thirteenth studio album by American rapper Ghostface Killah. The album is a sequel to Supreme Clientele, which was released 25 years earlier. It was released by Mass Appeal Records on August 22, 2025. It is the third album in Mass Appeal’s “Legend Has It…” series of albums released in 2025.

== Background ==
In September 2021, it was announced that a sequel album to Supreme Clientele by Ghostface Killah was in the works, with Kanye West and Mike Dean executive producing.

On April 16, 2025, Mass Appeal announced a series titled Legend Has It..., which features seven albums coming in 2025 from various artists such as: Nas and DJ Premier, Ghostface Killah, Raekwon, Mobb Deep, De La Soul, Big L, and Slick Rick.

== Track listing ==
Supreme Clientele 2 track listing
No.	Title	Writer(s)	Producer(s)	Length
1.	"Intro By Redman" (featuring Redman)	Dennis David Coles; Reginald Noble	Redman	0:45
2.	"Iron Man"	Coles	Chedda Bang	2:03
3.	"Sample 420" (with M.O.P.)	Coles; Eric Murray; Jamal Grinnage; Larry Mizell	DUF	2:30
4.	"Curtis May" (with Styles P and Conway the Machine)	Coles; David R. Styles; Demond Price; Lamont Juarez Porter	EZ Elpee; BackpackBeatz	3:48
5.	"4th Disciple"	Coles	4th Disciple	1:23
6.	"Windows"	Coles	Scram Jones; Ghostface Killah	1:55
7.	"Pause (Skit)"	Coles	Mr. Commodore	1:27
8.	"Georgy Porgy"	Coles; David Paich	Ghostface Killah	2:33
9.	"Force MD (Skit)" (with Ty Boogie)	Harry Palmer	Ghostface Killah	0:18
10.	"Break Beats"	Coles	Ghostface Killah	1:34
11.	"Beat Box" (with Ty Boogie and Aisha Hall)	Coles	Danny Caiazzo; Ghostface Killah	2:25
12.	"Rap Kingpin"	Coles; Marc Shemer	Scram Jones; Ghostface Killah	2:44
13.	"Sale of the Century (Skit)"	Coles; Dave Chappelle	Ray Ray Scavo III	1:17
14.	"The Trial" (featuring Raekwon, GZA, Method Man, Reek da Villian, and Pills)	Coles; Corey Woods; Gary Eldridge Grice; Clifford Smith Jr.	RoadsArt	3:12
15.	"Love Me Anymore" (with Nas)	Coles; Nasir Jones; Miles Gregory	J Black	2:49
16.	"Soul Thang" (featuring Driz, Nems, Ice, Supreme-Intelligence, Sun God, Pills, and Reek da Villian)	Coles; E. Robinson	Caiazzo	3:12
17.	"Metaphysics"	Coles; Thomas Bell; Linda Epstein	Metaphysics; Scavo	2:40
18.	"Candyland"	Coles; Deleno Matthews; Levar Coppin; Eugene Record; Barbara Acklin	Sean C & LV	2:50
19.	"Lenny Green (Skit)"	Coles	Lenny Green	0:31
20.	"The Zoom"	Coles; Lionel Richie; Ronald LaPread	Scavo	3:29
21.	"You Ma Friend" (with Method Man)	Coles; Smith	Scavo	3:54
22.	"Knuckles (Skit)"	Coles; Chappelle	Ghostface Killah	1:08
Total length:				48:27

== Personnel ==
Credits adapted from Tidal.

- Ghostface Killah – lead vocals (all tracks), programming (tracks 6, 8–12, 20, 22)
- Mike Bozzi – mastering
- Ray Ray Scavo III – engineering (all tracks), mixing (12, 21), programming (13, 17, 21)
- Young Guru – mixing (1–11, 13–20)
- Redman – lead vocals, programming (1)
- Scram Jones – turntable (2, 11), programming (6, 12)
- Chedda Bang – programming (2)
- Bobby Kesselman – spoken word (2)
- Billy Danze – lead vocals (3)
- Lil' Fame – lead vocals (3)
- DUF – programming (3)
- Conway the Machine – lead vocals (4)
- Styles P – lead vocals (4)
- BackpackBeatz – programming (4)
- EZ Elpee – programming (4)
- Greg Cohen – instrumentation (5, 8)
- 4th Disciple – programming (5)
- Mr. Commodore – programming (7)
- Ty Boogie – lead vocals (9 ,11)
- Technician the DJ – programming (10)
- Aisha Hall – lead vocals (11)
- Danny Caiazzo – programming (11, 16)
- Dave Chappelle – lead vocals (13, 22)
- Pills – lead vocals (14, 16)
- Method Man – lead vocals (14, 21)
- GZA – lead vocals (14)
- Raekwon – lead vocals (14)
- Reek da Villain – lead vocals (14)
- RoadsArt – programming (14)
- Nas – lead vocals (15)
- J Black – programming (15)
- Zeke Mishanec – engineering (15)
- Brendan O'Neil – engineering assistance (15)
- Driz – lead vocals (16)
- Ice – lead vocals (16)
- Nems – lead vocals (16)
- Sun God – lead vocals (16)
- Supreme-Intelligence – lead vocals (16)
- Peter Rosenberg – background vocals (17)
- Metaphysics – programming (17)
- Sean C – programming (18)
- LV – programming (18)
- Lenny Green – programming (19)

== Charts ==
Chart performance for Supreme Clientele 2
Chart (2025)	Peak position
UK Album Downloads (Official Charts)	17
UK R&B Albums (Official Charts)	25
US Independent Albums (Billboard)	37
US Top Current Album Sales (Billboard)	46
