= Paranoia 2 =

Mixtape by Dave East
- Released: January 16, 2018
- Recorded: 2016–17
- Genre: Hip hop
- Length: 56:14
- Label: Def Jam; Mass Appeal; From the Dirt
- Producer: Beat Butcha; Buda & Grandz; Cardiak; Citoonthebeat; CritaCal; DaSanchize; DJ Khalil; Humbeats; Illmind; Joe Joe Beats; Kangaroo; MP Williams; Reazy Renegade; Rico Suave; Street Symphony; Triple A; V Don

Dave East chronology
Karma (2017)	Paranoia 2 (2018)	Karma 2 (2018)

Paranoia 2 is a thirteenth mixtape by American rapper Dave East. It was released on January 16, 2018, by Def Jam Recordings, Mass Appeal Records and From the Dirt. The Mixtape features guest appearances from Tory Lanez, T.I., Lloyd Banks, Bino Rideaux, Matt Patterson and Marsha Ambrosius. This Mixtape is a sequel to Paranoia: A True Story and serves as the second prelude towards Dave East's debut studio album.

== Background ==
On September 27, 2017, Dave East announced the sequel to Paranoia: A True Story, just a month after its release. The EP was originally set to be released before Halloween, however the date was pushed back.

On January 2, 2018, East revealed the EP's artwork and release date via Twitter and Instagram. On January 15, 2018, the EP's tracklist was revealed.

== Promotion ==
=== Tour ===
On January 1, 2018, Dave East announced an official headlining concert tour to further promote the album titled Paranoia 2 Tour. The tour began on January 16, 2018, in New York City, at the Irving Plaza.

Tour dates
Date	City	Venue
United States
January 16, 2018	New York City	Irving Plaza
January 18, 2018	Boston	Paradise Rock Club
January 19, 2018	Baltimore	Baltimore Soundstage
January 21, 2018	Atlanta	The Loft
January 23, 2018	Houston	Warehouse Live
January 24, 2018	Dallas	Trees Dallas
January 26, 2018	San Antonio	Alamo City Music Hall
January 28, 2018	Phoenix	Pub Rock
January 29, 2018	Santa Ana	Constellation Room
January 30, 2018	Los Angeles	El Rey Theatre
February 1, 2018	Sacramento	Harlow's
February 2, 2018	Portland	Peter's Room
February 3, 2018	Seattle	Studio Seven
February 6, 2018	Denver	Bluebird Theater
February 8, 2018	Kansas City	Riot Room

== Track listing ==
Credits adapted from Tidal.

Paranoia 2
No.	Title	Writer(s)	Producer(s)	Length
1.	"Talk to Big"	David Brewster; Tivon Key; Crystal Caines	V Don; MP Williams^{[b]}	4:28
2.	"Prosper"	Brewster; Joe Cruz	Joe Joe Beats	3:57
3.	"Woke Up" (featuring Tory Lanez)	Brewster; Bryan Johnson; Daystar Peterson	Reazy Renegade	3:12
4.	"Powder"	Brewster; Avery Humber	Humbeats	3:35
5.	"Corey"	Brewster; Carl McCormick; Khalil Abdul-Rahman	Cardiak; DJ Khalil^{[a]}	5:16
6.	"Thank You"	Brewster; Ramon Ibanga, Jr.; Calvin Price	Illmind; CritaCal^{[c]}	3:43
7.	"I Can Not"	Brewster; Andre Atkins	Triple A	3:27
8.	"Regular Harlem Shit" (featuring Pimp Pimp P)			0:50
9.	"Annoying" (featuring T.I.)	Brewster; Clifford Harris	Dave East & T.I.	2:58
10.	"What Made Me"	Brewster; Daniel Garcia; Francis Ubiera; Ruban Sosa	Buda & Grandz; Citoonthebeat; DaSanchize^{[c]}	3:57
11.	"Violent" (featuring Lloyd Banks)	Brewster; Casey Camacho; Christopher Lloyd	Rico Suave	3:55
12.	"Keisha Pt 2"	Brewster; Corey Raekwon Woods	Raekwon	4:00
13.	"Maintain" (featuring Bino Rideaux)	Brewster; Joshua Curney; Justin Rainey	Dinero Gotti	2:46
14.	"Never Been" (featuring Tory Lanez)	Brewster; Garcia; Peterson; Cruz; Eliot Dubock	Buda & Grandz; Joe Joe Beats^{[a]}; Beat Butcha^{[b]}	3:46
15.	"Grateful" (featuring Marsha Ambrosius)	Brewster; Torrance Esmond; Antwuan Brown; Askia Fountain; Steven Carless; Marsha Ambrosius	Street Symphony; Kangaroo	6:24
Total length:				56:14

Notes

- ^{^[a]} signifies a co-producer
- ^{^[b]} signifies an additional producer
- ^{^[c]} signifies an uncredited co-producer
- "Talk to Big" features additional vocals from Crystal Caines
- "Corey" features additional vocals from Jonnell Payton
- "Regular Harlem Shit" features vocals from Jerette Hampton and Marcus DeWitt Jr.
- "Violent" features additional vocals from Justeen Dominguez

== Personnel ==
Credits adapted from Tidal.

Performers

- Dave East – primary artist
- Tory Lanez – featured artist (track 3)
- Pimp Pimp P – featured artist (track 8)
- T.I. – featured artist (track 9)
- Lloyd Banks – featured artist (track 11)
- Bino Rideaux – featured artist (track 13)
- Matt Patterson – featured artist (track 14)
- Marsha Ambrosius – featured artist (track 15)

Technical

- Victor Wainstein – recording engineer (track 1)
- Fabian Marasciullo – mixer (tracks 1–7, 9–15)
- McCoy Socalgargoyle – assistant mixer (tracks 1–7, 9–15)
- Jeff "Ramzy" Ramirez – recording engineer (tracks 2, 14)
- Mike Kuz – recording engineer (tracks 3, 4, 7, 9, 11–13), mixer (track 10)
- Johann Chavez – recording engineer (track 3)
- William Sullivan – recording engineer (track 5)
- Lorenzo Rosado – recording engineer (track 6)
- Jeremy "Tha Jerm" Gonzalez – recording engineer (track 10)
- Fabian Rubio – recording engineer (track 11)
- Isaiah Brown – recording engineer (track 15)
- William "Bilz" Dougan – assistant recording engineer (track 15)

Production

- V Don – producer (track 1)
- MP Williams – additional producer (track 1)
- Joe Joe Beats – producer (tracks 2, 8, 12), co-producer (track 14)
- Reazy Renegade – producer (track 3)
- Humbeats – producer (track 4)
- Cardiak – producer (track 5)
- DJ Khalil – co-producer (track 5)
- Illmind – producer (track 6)
- CritaCal – uncredited co-producer (track 6)
- Triple A – producer (track 7)
- Buda & Grandz – producer (tracks 10, 14)
- Citoonthebeat – producer (track 10)
- DaSanchize – uncredited co-producer (track 10)
- Rico Suave – producer (track 11)
- Dinero Gotti – producer (track 13)
- Beat Butcha – additional producer (track 14)
- Street Symphony – producer (track 15)
- Kangaroo – producer (track 15)

== Charts ==
Chart (2018)	Peak position
US Billboard 200	61
US Top R&B/Hip-Hop Albums (Billboard)	39
