= Infinite (Mobb Deep album) =

Studio album by Mobb Deep
- Released: October 10, 2025
- Genre: Hip-hop
- Length: 51:36
- Label: Mass Appeal
- Producers: Havoc; The Alchemist

Mobb Deep chronology
| The Infamous Mobb Deep (2014) | Infinite (2025) |

Legend Has It... chronology
| Supreme Clientele 2 (2025) | Infinite (2025) | Harlem's Finest: Return of the King (2025) |

Singles from Infinite
- 1. "Against the World" Released: September 12, 2025; 2. "Taj Mahal" Released: September 26, 2025; 3. "Down for You" Released: October 9, 2025; 4. "Look at Me" Released: October 9, 2025

Infinite is the ninth album by the American hip-hop duo Mobb Deep. The album was released on October 10, 2025, by Mass Appeal Records. The album features previously unreleased vocals from Prodigy, who died in 2017. Surviving member Havoc produced the album with the Alchemist. It is the fourth album in Mass Appeal's Legend Has It… series of albums released in 2025.

== Background ==
On July 16, 2024, Havoc announced that a new Mobb Deep album was in development that would be produced by him and the Alchemist, collaborators since the late 1990s.

On April 16, 2025, Mass Appeal announced a series titled Legend Has It..., which featured seven albums released in 2025 from various artists such as Nas and DJ Premier, Ghostface Killah, Raekwon, Mobb Deep, De La Soul, Big L, and Slick Rick.

On August 11, 2025, Havoc announced that the album would be titled Infinite, and that the production on it was completed.

The album was released on October 10, 2025.

== Critical reception ==
Professional ratings
Aggregate scores
| Source | Rating |
|---|---|
| Metacritic | 72/100 |
Review scores
| Source | Rating |
| AllMusic | 3/5 stars |
| The Arts Desk | 8/10 |
| Beats Per Minute | 81% |
| Pitchfork | 6.6/10 |
| Tom Hull – on the Web | B |

According to the review aggregator Metacritic, Infinite received "generally favorable reviews" based on a weighted average score of 72 out of 100 from 5 critic scores.

=== Accolades ===
| Publication | Accolade | Rank | Ref. |
|---|---|---|---|
| Double J | The best albums of 2025 | 45 | |
| HotNewHipHop | The 40 Best Rap Albums of 2025 | 22 | |
| Rolling Stone | The 100 Best Albums of 2025 | 78 | |

== Track listing ==
Infinite track listing
| No. | Title | Writer(s) | Producer(s) | Length |
|---|---|---|---|---|
| 1. | "Against the World" | Albert Johnson; Kejuan Waliek Muchita | Havoc | 3:27 |
| 2. | "Gunfire" | Johnson; Muchita; Alan Daniel Maman | The Alchemist | 2:37 |
| 3. | "Easy Bruh" | Johnson; Muchita | Havoc | 3:07 |
| 4. | "Look at Me" (featuring Clipse) | Johnson; Muchita; Gene Elliott Thornton Jr.; Terrence LeVarr Thornton | Havoc | 3:29 |
| 5. | "The M. The O. The B. The B." (featuring Big Noyd) | Johnson; Muchita; TaJuan Akeem Perry | Havoc | 3:42 |
| 6. | "Down for You" (featuring Nas and Jorja Smith) | Johnson; Muchita; Nasir bin Olu Dara Jones; Jorja Alice Smith | Havoc | 3:40 |
| 7. | "Taj Mahal" | Johnson; Muchita; Maman | The Alchemist | 3:37 |
| 8. | "Mr Magik" | Johnson; Muchita | Havoc | 3:14 |
| 9. | "Score Points" | Johnson; Muchita; Maman | The Alchemist | 3:54 |
| 10. | "My Era" | Johnson; Muchita; Maman | The Alchemist | 3:07 |
| 11. | "Pour the Henny" (featuring Nas) | Johnson; Muchita; Jones | Havoc | 4:15 |
| 12. | "Clear Black Nights" (featuring Raekwon and Ghostface Killah) | Johnson; Muchita; Corey Woods; Dennis David Coles | Havoc | 3:38 |
| 13. | "Discontinued" | Johnson; Muchita | Havoc | 2:48 |
| 14. | "Love the Way (Down for You Part 2)" (featuring Nas and H.E.R.) | Johnson; Muchita; Jones; Gabriella Sarmiento Wilson | Havoc | 3:44 |
| 15. | "We the Real Thing" | Johnson; Muchita | Havoc | 3:17 |
| Total length: | | | | 51:36 |

=== Sample credits ===
Adapted from the album's liner notes:

- "The M. The O. The B. The B." contains interpolations from "Jimmy", written by Lawrence Parker, Angela Brown, Cheryl Cooke, Gwendolyn Chisolm, and Sylvia Robinson, and performed by Boogie Down Productions.
- "Score Points" contains a sample of "Tango Panache", written by Charles Goubin and performed by Potemkine.
- "Pour the Henny" contains a sample of "Doricamente", written and performed by Ennio Morricone.

== Personnel ==
Credits adapted from the album's liner notes and Tidal.

=== Mobb Deep ===
- Havoc – lead vocals, executive producer
- Prodigy – lead vocals, executive producer

=== Additional contributors ===
- Mark Christensen – mastering
- Eddie Sancho – mixing (tracks 1–4, 6–12, 14)
- The Alchemist – programming (1, 7, 9, 10)
- Malice – lead vocals (4)
- Pusha T – lead vocals (4)
- Diogo Zaccara – mixing (5, 13)
- Big Noyd – lead vocals (5)
- Nas – lead vocals (6, 11, 14)
- Zeke Mishanec – engineering (6, 11, 14)
- Jorja Smith – lead vocals (6)
- Justin Klatzko – engineering assistance (6)
- Greg Cohen – additional instruments (11, 12)
- Nicholas Ryan Gant – additional vocals (11)
- Brendan O'Neill – engineering assistance (11)
- Raekwon – lead vocals (12)
- Ghostface Killah – lead vocals (12)
- Lenesha Randolph – additional vocals (12)
- H.E.R. – lead vocals (14)
- Maximilien Hein – engineering assistance (14)
- Mike Lukowski – art direction, design
- Danny Hastings – photography

== Charts ==
Chart performance for Infinite
| Chart (2025) | Peak position |
|---|---|
| Australian Hip Hop/R&B Albums (ARIA) | 35 |
| Japanese Dance & Soul Albums (Oricon) | 9 |
| Japanese Download Albums (Billboard Japan) | 72 |
| Scottish Albums (Official Charts) | 98 |
| Swiss Albums (Schweizer Hitparade) | 77 |
| UK Album Downloads (Official Charts) | 8 |
| UK Independent Albums (Official Charts) | 20 |
| UK Physical Albums (OCC) | 63 |
| UK R&B Albums (Official Charts) | 3 |
| US Billboard 200 | 90 |
| US Independent Albums (Billboard) | 13 |
| US Top R&B/Hip-Hop Albums (Billboard) | 24 |

== Release history ==
Release formats for Infinite
| Region | Date | Format | Label | Ref. |
|---|---|---|---|---|
| Various | October 10, 2025 | CD; digital download; streaming; vinyl; cassette | HClass; Infamous; Mass Appeal | |
