= Karma 4 =

Studio album by Dave East
- Released: October 14, 2025
- Genres: Hip-hop; East Coast hip-hop
- Length: 68:04
- Label: From the Dirt
- Producers: Dave East; Harry Fraud; Mike & Keys; Nicholas Craven; 29millions; Buda & Grandz; FOREVEROLLING; Froodough; High Honors; Kino Beats; Mike Kuz; Mr. Authentic; Trevor Utterback; VyruzBeats; Young T

Dave East chronology
| Fine Dining (2025) | Karma 4 (2025) |

Deluxe edition cover

Singles from Karma 4
- 1. "Havana" Released: September 17, 2025; 2. "Demon" Released: October 9, 2025; 3. "12 Months" Released: October 17, 2025; 4. "Man in the Mirror" Released: October 29, 2025

Professional ratings
Review scores
| Source | Rating |
|---|---|
| Rap Reviews | 7/10 |

Karma 4 is the third studio album by American rapper Dave East. It was released on October 14, 2025, by From the Dirt. A deluxe edition was released on October 29, 2025. It is his first independent solo album since his departure from Def Jam Recordings.The album features notable guest appearances by Jacquees, Jeremih, Key Glock, Larry June, Maino, Mozzy, Nipsey Hussle, Rell, Stove God Cooks and Wiz Khalifa. The deluxe edition contains a guest appearance of Big Sean. Production was handled by various producers including Dave East himself, Harry Fraud, Mike & Keys and Nicholas Craven. It is the fourth installment in the Karma series, which began in 2017.

== Background ==
On September 17, 2025, Dave East announces the future release of the album. The announcement was accompanied by the release of the lead single Havana. It followed East’s recent appearance on Kai Cenat’s Mafiathon 3 stream, during which he also released a new freestyle and previewed a track featuring the late Nipsey Hussle that would appear on the album.

The album was positioned as both a continuation and evolution of the series, reflecting East’s growth and independence (described as his first official independent project under From The Dirt/FTD). Its artwork pays homage to Tupac Shakur’s iconic 1995 Vibe magazine cover shoot.

On October 29, 2025, a deluxe edition of the album was released with an exclusive new single entitled Man in the Mirror, which features Detroit rapper Big Sean.

== Track listing ==
Standard edition
| No. | Title | Writer(s) | Producer(s) | Length |
|---|---|---|---|---|
| 1. | "Poverty" (Intro) | David Lawrence Brewster Jr. | Dave East | 1:22 |
| 2. | "Heard You" | Brewster Jr.; Trevor Gerard Utterback | Mr. Authentic; VyruzBeats | 2:33 |
| 3. | "Bottega Trunks" (featuring Stove God Cooks) | Brewster Jr.; Aaron Cook; Nicholas Craven | Nicholas Craven | 4:40 |
| 4. | "Havana" | Brewster Jr.; Chad Rivera; Alex Cruz | High Honors | 2:13 |
| 5. | "Bacc 2 It" (Skit) | Brewster Jr. | Dave East | 0:12 |
| 6. | "Met Gala" (featuring Key Glock) | Brewster Jr.; Markeyvius LaShun Cathey; Francis Ubiera; Daniel Garcia; Michael Kuzoian | Mike Kuz; Buda & Grandz | 2:17 |
| 7. | "Ahki Store" | Brewster Jr.; Utterback | Mr. Authentic | 2:27 |
| 8. | "Demon" | Brewster Jr. | FOREVEROLLING | 2:16 |
| 9. | "Stand on That" (featuring Jeremih) | Brewster Jr.; Jeremy Phillip Felton; Rivera; Cruz | High Honors | 2:38 |
| 10. | "Respectfully" (featuring Larry June) | Brewster Jr.; Leonard Eugene Hendricks III; Craven | Nicholas Craven | 3:09 |
| 11. | "30 Seconds" (Skit) | Brewster Jr. | Dave East | 0:31 |
| 12. | "Runnin'" (featuring Cruch Calhoun) | Brewster Jr.; Jerea Tyri Prather; Rivera; Cruz | High Honors | 2:51 |
| 13. | "Goodfellas" (Skit) | Brewster Jr. | Dave East | 1:41 |
| 14. | "Crazy" | Brewster Jr.; Rivera; Cruz | High Honors | 3:05 |
| 15. | "Winning Feel Better" (featuring Wiz Khalifa) | Brewster Jr.; Cameron Jibril Thomaz | Kino Beats | 5:02 |
| 16. | "Desperation" (featuring Neek Bucks) | Brewster Jr.; Unique Herbert; Cruz; Rivera | High Honors | 2:38 |
| 17. | "Shooter Blocc" (with Harry Fraud) | Brewster Jr.; Rory William Quigley | Harry Fraud | 3:04 |
| 18. | "Fuggetaboutit" (Skit) | Brewster Jr. | Dave East | 0:51 |
| 19. | "Bus Stop" (featuring Mozzy) | Brewster Jr.; Timothy Cornell Patterson | 29millions | 3:36 |
| 20. | "12 Months" (with Mike & Keys featuring Nipsey Hussle) | Brewster Jr.; Ermias Joseph Asghedom | Mike & Keys | 3:26 |
| 21. | "Numb, Pt. 2" (featuring Rell) | Brewster Jr. | High Honors | 4:07 |
| 22. | "Never Get Enough" (featuring Jacquees) | Brewster Jr.; Rodriquez Jacquees Broadnax; Utterback | Mr. Authentic; VyruzBeats | 2:43 |
| 23. | "What We Talkin'" (with High Honors featuring Maino) | Brewster Jr.; Jermaine Coleman; Rivera; Cruz | High Honors | 3:25 |
| 24. | "Customs" (featuring Keen Streetz) | Brewster Jr.; Rivera; Cruz | High Honors | 2:38 |
| 25. | "My Dawgs" (featuring Skylar Blatt) | Brewster Jr.; Sade Johnson | Young T; Froodough | 3:53 |
| 26. | "Free Scrappy Loc" (Outro) | Brewster Jr. | Dave East | 0:46 |
| Total length: | | | | 68:04 |

Deluxe Edition
| No. | Title | Writer(s) | Producer(s) | Length |
|---|---|---|---|---|
| 26. | "Man in the Mirror" (with Big Sean) | Brewster Jr.; Sean Michael Leonard Anderson; Rivera; Cruz; Bernard James Freeman | High Honors | 4:14 |
| 27. | "Taylor Swift" | Brewster Jr.; Andre William Prise; John Groover; Michael Ray Cox, Jr. | AQUA STONE THRONE; Mike & Keys | 3:09 |
| 28. | "Committed" | Brewster Jr.; Groover; Cox, Jr. | Mike & Keys | 3:51 |
| 29. | "Pablo" | Brewster Jr. | Mike & Keys | 3:00 |
| 30. | "It's a Shame" | Brewster Jr. | High Honors | 2:22 |
| 31. | "Death Around the Corner" | Brewster Jr.; Groover; Cox, Jr. | Mike & Keys | 3:06 |
| 32. | "Blue Cheese" | Brewster Jr. | High Honors | 2:25 |
| 33. | "Free Scrappy Loc" (Outro) | Brewster Jr. | Dave East | 0:46 |
| Total length: | | | | 90:11 |
