= Kiing Shooter =

American rapper (1992–2020)

- Born: William Antonio Daniels; July 25, 1992; New York City, New York, U.S.
- Died: May 5, 2020 (aged 27) New York City, New York, U.S.
- Genres: Hip hop
- Occupations: Rapper; songwriter
- Years active: 2017–2020
- Labels: Mass Appeal; Street Dreams; From the Dirt

William Antonio Daniels (July 25, 1992 – May 5, 2020), better known by his stage name Kiing Shooter, was an American rapper from Queensbridge, New York. He first gained recognition for his affiliation with hometown native Dave East, after releasing numerous collaborations with the rapper. He signed with East's From the Dirt Records to release his debut extended play (EP) Fucc The Doubters (2018), which narrowly entered the Billboard 200. He also signed with Jungle's Street Dreams Records to release his second EP, No Turning Bacc (2019), a deal which entered a triple joint venture with the latter's brother, Nas' Mass Appeal Records to release his debut studio album, Still Outside (2020).

== Career ==
Kiing Shooter was a long-time friend of rapper Dave East and had been touring with the rapper since 2015, although he never took an interest in taking rapping seriously until 2017. Kiing Shooter made numerous appearances on East's mixtapes and was the first signee of his From The Dirt record label in March 2018. East was subsequently featured on the single "Eye Witness" by Kiing Shooter on June 9, 2018, and the music video had a guest appearances from rapper Snoop Dogg. He guest featured on the song "Traumatized" by Dave East from the latter's mixtape Karma 2 (2018), which peaked at 42 on the Billboard 200.

Kiing Shooter released his debut extended play Fucc The Doubters on August 24, 2018. It featured guest appearances from East, Don Q, and Corey Finesse, among others. It was released by East's From the Dirt label and peaked at 148 on the US Billboard 200. The album was noted for its authenticity, drive and rise, gaining the attention of New York rapper, Jungle. Jungle launched his own record label, Street Dream Records to sign Kiing Shooter in February 2019.

Kiing Shooter released his second EP, No Turning Bacc on April 20, 2019 as his first release with the latter label. It was supported by the single "If I Could Talk To Them", which was released commercially on May 9 and reflects on the many losses he has faced throughout the road to success. Kiing Shooter and Dave East released a collaborative remix to Pop Smoke's "Welcome to the Party" on August 10, 2019. That same month, he guest featured on the single "Say Less" by British rapper ASB. The pair went on to support Dave East on his Survival Tour, which spanned from November 22, 2019 – December 20, 2019.

On March 13, 2020, Shooter released the single "Losses" featuring Uncle Murda, after teasing the cover art for the song on Instagram in January of that year. The single intended as the lead single of his debut studio album Still Outside, which was released on March 27, 2020. The 11 track mixtape also contained features from Corey Finesse, Dave East, Mac Dre, Jazzy Amra, PNV Jay and Poppa Da Don, and was released by Street Dreams and Mass Appeal Records.

== Artistry ==
His artistry has been compared to rappers such as Dave East and Don Q, and he is known for his aggressive style of rap. He is noted for his bars that are setting sights and sounds of East Coast culture in his music.

== Death ==
You made your mark and got your wings
On many hearts, you pulled their strings
From QB to Heaven, the world in between
What a pleasure to have you, in our lives, in this world, in our world
We shared our street dreams.

— A poem by Nas on Kiing Shooter.

Daniels was admitted to hospital on April 23, 2020, after showing symptoms of cirrhosis. His condition got worse over time and on May 5, 2020, it was confirmed that he had died of liver failure. It was reported that the liver failure may have been due to complications with COVID-19 during the COVID-19 pandemic in New York City, though his friend David Brewster (Dave East) quickly denounced this on social media. Daniels himself said the cause of his liver problem was due to the excessive consumption of Hennessy. Numerous contemporaries including label managers Nas and Jungle as well as fellow rappers Dave East, ASB, Uncle Murda paid tribute to the deceased rapper. A vigil was held the following day in Daniels hometown of Queensbridge, New York. Due to the COVID-19 pandemic in the United States, three people were arrested after violating social distancing rules in which a minimum of 75 people attended.

== Discography ==
=== Studio albums ===
- Still Outside (2020)

=== Extended plays ===
- Fucc The Doubters (2018)
- No Turning Bacc (2019)
- I Am Kiing (2022)
