= Karma 3 =

Mixtape by Dave East
- Released: August 14, 2020
- Genre: Hip-hop
- Length: 52:42
- Label: Mass Appeal; Def Jam; From the Dirt
- Producer: AraabMuzik; Audio Anthem; Buda and Grandz; Citoonthebeat; Dizzy Banko; DJ Paul; Dougie On The Beat; G Koop; Jake One; Little Island; Maki; Mike & Keys; Mike 'Kuz' Kuzoian; Motif Alumni; MP808; OGTha3; Omar Grand; Sap; S. Dot; Triple A; V Don

Dave East chronology
Karma 2 (2018)	Karma 3 (2020)	Hoffa (2021)

Singles from Karma 3
- 1. "Handsome" Released: April 22, 2020; 2. "Envy" Released: October 20, 2020

Karma 3 is the fifteenth mixtape by American rapper Dave East. It was released on August 14, 2020, via Mass Appeal, Def Jam Recordings and From the Dirt. Production was handled by several record producers, including AraabMuzik, Mike & Keys, DJ Paul, Dougie On The Beat, G Koop, Jake One, MP808, OGTha3, and Sap. It features guest appearances from Jozzy, A Boogie wit da Hoodie, Benny the Butcher, Bino Rideaux, Doe Boy, Mary J. Blige, Popcaan, Trey Songz, Trouble and Young Dolph. The album debuted at number 36 on the Billboard 200, and received acclaim from critics.

A deluxe version of the mixtape followed on October 23, 2020, with features from Dej Loaf, Junior Reid, Chris Brown and G Herbo, as well as the "Handsome" remix featuring Jeezy.

== Critical reception ==
Professional ratings
Aggregate scores
Source	Rating
Metacritic	82/100
Review scores
Source	Rating
AllMusic	4/5 stars
Clash	8/10
HipHopDX	3.7/5
NME	4/5 stars

At Metacritic, which assigns a normalized rating out of 100 to reviews from mainstream publications, Karma 3 received an average score of 82 based on four reviews, indicating "universal acclaim".

AllMusic's Neil Z. Yeung said, "the album is very much substance over style, showcasing East's deft wordplay and storytelling talents without too many flashy distractions. On that end, Karma 3's production is robust and straightforward, evoking another time and place with old-school samples and head-nodding beats". Eero Holi of Clash said, "The tough guy act only gets you so far, though. And that is why 'Karma 3' really comes alive when East exposes his character's soft underbelly. ... Memories tainted by regret and guilt – the flip side of nostalgia – resonate in Motown-style acoustic instrumentation and chunky Golden Era beats combined with a supreme cast of vocalists". Will Lavin of NME said, "A charged effort with dynamic results, 'Karma 3' may not be as flawless a spectacle as Survival, but it's not all that far off. And it's definitely the best entry in the 'Karma' series. East remains consistent, unapologetically flying the flag for New York hip-hop". Eric Diep of HipHopDX said, "While Karma 3 isn't the show-stopping follow-up to Survival, East is still going to outwork any MC, dropping album after album until he's good and ready to hang up the mic".

== Track listing ==
No.	Title	Writer(s)	Producer(s)	Length
1.	"Handsome"	David Brewster; Jason Esosa Idehen; John Groover; Michael Ray Cox Jr.	Little Island; Mike & Keys	2:53
2.	"Unruly" (featuring Popcaan)	Brewster; Andrae Hugh Sutherland; Ruben D. Sosa Jr.	Citoonthebeat	4:12
3.	"The City" (featuring Trey Songz)	Brewster; Tremaine Neverson; Douglas Whitehead; Daniel Walsh; Harvey Price; Shawn Carter	Dougie On The Beat	2:22
4.	"Get the Money" (featuring Trouble)	Brewster; Mariel Semonte Orr; Abraham Orellana; Rafael X. Brown	AraabMuzik; Audio Anthem	3:38
5.	"Thank God" (featuring A Boogie wit da Hoodie)	Brewster; Artist Julius Dubose; Orellana; Betty Newsinger; John Tout; Michael Dunford	araabMUZIK	4:35
6.	"Said What I Said" (featuring Doe Boy)	Brewster; Cotrell Dennard; Marcus Rucker; Tivon Key	Motif Alumni; V Don	3:47
7.	"Broke or Not" (featuring Jozzy)	Brewster; Jocelyn Donald; Edgar Nabeyin Panford; Miles Franklin; Paul Kyser	Nabeyin; Super Miles	3:00
8.	"Mission" (featuring Jozzy)	Brewster; Donald; Terrell McNeal; Oliver Grose III; Darwin Cordale Quinn; Tyrone Griffin	MP808; OGTha3; C Gutta Beatz	3:03
9.	"Menace"	Brewster; Robert Mandell; Jacob Dutton; Groover; Cox Jr.	G Koop; Jake One; Mike & Keys	2:56
10.	"Fuck Dat" (featuring Young Dolph)	Brewster; Adolph Thornton Jr.; Paul Beauregard; Darnell Carlton; Jordan Houston; Ricky Dunigan	DJ Paul	3:41
11.	"Blue Story" (featuring Bino Rideaux)	Brewster; Brandon Rainey; Matthew Athanasiou; Michael Kuzoian	Maki; Mike 'Kuz' Kuzoian	3:53
12.	"Stone Killer" (featuring Benny The Butcher)	Brewster; Jeremie Pennick; Daniel Garcia; Francis Ubiera; Shawn Thomas; Kuzoian	Buda and Grandz; S. Dot; Mike 'Kuz' Kuzoian	3:13
13.	"Envy"	Brewster; Jonathan King	SAP	2:57
14.	"Know How I Feel" (featuring Mary J. Blige)	Brewster; Mary J. Blige; Deandre Sumpter; Omar Perrin; Andre Atkins	Dizzy Banko; Omar Grand; Triple A	4:50
15.	"Believe It or Not"	Brewster; Garcia; Ubiera; Thomas	Buda and Grandz; S. Dot	3:42
Total length:				52:42

== Charts ==
Chart (2020)	Peak position
US Billboard 200	36
US Top R&B/Hip-Hop Albums (Billboard)	23
