= Fortune Favors the Bold (album) =

2023 studio album by Dave East

Studio album by Dave East
- Released: July 14, 2023
- Genre: Hip hop; East Coast hip hop
- Length: 63:08
- Label: Def Jam
- Producer: Amadeus; AraabMuzik; Avedon; Big Len; Buda & Grandz; bvtman; Coleman; Cool & Dre; Nas; Dave East; David Brewster, Sr.; DJ Khalil; Don Cannon; James Burns; Jay Townsend; DJ Ill Will; Julian Vahle; J-Bo; Kairi Chanel Brewster; Mike Ehrhart; Mike Kuz; Mike WiLL Made-It; Mike & Keys; Motif Alumni; Omar Grand; Rahki; RZA; Sap; Scram Jones; Shawn Hibbler; TAMÆ; Trilogy; Triple A; UNKWN; WhatsGoodKev; 10FURFRIENDS; 808-Ray; 1500 or Nothin'

Dave East chronology
HDIGH (2022)	Fortune Favors the Bold (2023)	Hate me now 2 (Gangsta Grillz) (2024)

Fortune Favors the Bold is the second studio album by American rapper Dave East. It was released on July 14, 2023, by Def Jam. Production was handled by various producers including Cool & Dre, DJ Khalil, Don Cannon, Mike WiLL Made-It, Mike & Keys, Rahki, RZA, Scram Jones and 1500 or Nothin'. The album features notable guest appearances by Coi Leray, Cordae, Ghostface Killah, G-Eazy, Jadakiss, Kid Capri, Ty Dolla Sign and Tyga.

== Background ==
On July 3, 2023, Dave East announced he would be releasing his second studio album on July 14, 2023. He also revealed the album's cover, producers and featured artists.

On July 14, 2023, he declared during an interview that the album was inspired by the John Wick movie franchise.

== Track listing ==
- Credits adapted from Tidal.

Fortune Favors the Bold track listing
No.	Title	Writer(s)	Producer(s)	Length
1.	"Here I Go Interlude"	David Lawrence Brewster, Jr.	Dave East	0:19
2.	"Come 2 Far" (with Cool & Dre featuring Kid Capri)	Brewster, Jr.; David Anthony Love, Jr.	Cool & Dre; 808-Ray; Shawn Hibbler; Mike Ehrhart; Jay Townsend	2:41
3.	"Pops Interlude"	Brewster, Jr.	Dave East; David Brewster, Sr.	0:16
4.	"Still Here"	Brewster, Jr.	bvtman; UNKWN	3:54
5.	"Long Way" (featuring Cordae)	Brewster, Jr.; Cordae Amari Dunston	Buda & Grandz; James Burns; Mike Kuz; WhatsGoodKev	3:49
6.	"Damn"	Brewster, Jr.	DJ Khalil; Mike & Keys	3:13
7.	"Sex So Good" (featuring Coi Leray)	Brewster, Jr.; Coi Leray Collins	Don Cannon	2:32
8.	"Good Good Good" (featuring Ghostface Killah, Stacy Barthe and Kaylan Arnold)	Brewster, Jr.; Dennis David Coles; Stacy Barthe; Kaylan Arnold	Scram Jones	4:18
9.	"Pops Interlude Pt. 2"	Brewster, Jr.	David Brewster, Sr.	0:18
10.	"Hustlers" (featuring Tyga)	Brewster, Jr.; Micheal Ray Stevenson	Don Cannon	2:58
11.	"Wdgaf" (with G-Eazy)	Brewster, Jr.; Gerald Earl Gillum; Michael Len Williams II; Earl Patrick Taylor; Justin Garner	Mike WiLL Made-It; J-Bo	2:24
12.	"Kairi Interlude"	Brewster, Jr.	Kairi Chanel Brewster	0:04
13.	"Can't Make This Up"	Brewster, Jr.	DJ Khalil; Mike & Keys	3:03
14.	"Still Outside Interlude"	Brewster, Jr.	Dave East	0:06
15.	"Dope Boy"	Brewster, Jr.; Francis Ubiera; Carlos Colón	Buda & Grandz; Big Len; WhatsGoodKev; 10FURFRIENDS	3:10
16.	"Million Off Rap"	Brewster, Jr.	Mike & Keys	2:43
17.	"Good Things" (featuring Ty Dolla Sign)	Brewster, Jr.; Tyrone William Griffin, Jr.	Avedon; Julian Vahle; Omar Grand	2:46
18.	"Rich Problems"	Brewster, Jr.	Amadeus; Trilogy	3:54
19.	"Weirdos" (featuring Jadakiss)	Brewster, Jr.; Jason Terrance Phillips	AraabMuzik; Motif Alumni; Coleman; Tamæ	4:30
20.	"Thru the Mud"	Brewster, Jr.	Rahki	2:48
21.	"It's a Lot"	Brewster, Jr.	Sap	3:09
22.	"Like a Rose"	Brewster, Jr.; Larrance Dopson; James Fauntleroy; Brody Brown; Mario Delgado; Michael Ray Cox; John Groover	1500 or Nothin'; Mike & Keys	3:52
23.	"Letter 2 Kobi"	Brewster, Jr.	Triple A	3:22
24.	"Hallway Piss" (Bonus track)	Brewster, Jr.; Robert Fitzgerald Diggs	RZA	2:57
Total length:				63:08
