= Pvrx =

- Born: Daniel Dove; October 25, 1994 (age 32); Rexdale, Etobicoke, Ontario, Canada
- Origin: Toronto, Ontario, Canada
- Genre: Hip hop
- Occupations: Rapper; singer; songwriter
- Years active: 2011–present
- Label: Def Jam

Daniel Dove (born October 25, 1994), professionally known as Pvrx (/paɪˈrɛks/ Pie-Rex), is a Canadian rapper, singer, and songwriter. Pvrx is known for his storytelling about growing up in the rough surroundings in government housing projects. He signed to Def Jam Recordings in 2017. He released his debut EP 3.14 on July 26, 2019.

== Early life ==
Pvrx was born and raised in the Rexdale neighbourhood in the former city of Etobicoke in Toronto, Ontario, his hometown is also the reasoning for the stylisation of his stage name. He is the youngest child of 3 siblings to a single Jamaican mother. Though he has stated his mother was an avid listener of dancehall music, his influence includes the like of The Lox, Jay-Z, Eminem and 50 Cent. He states that he has had a rough upbringing surrounded by Gang violence and poverty which he often portrays in his music. At the age of 15 Pvrx started to sell drugs to fund his lifestyle and was consequently arrested and placed in a juvenile detention center. He started making music as a tool for therapy of his harsh reality.

== Career ==
=== 2011–2015: Beginnings and hiatus ===
Pvrx began rapping and singing in 2011 at the age of 17 under the alias Onsight RX as a therapy tool for his harsh reality growing up. He released numerous freestyles during this time alongside Moula 1st, Yung Dubz and others from Rexdale. Also a lot with Turk, Banana Clip and a few others who repped Sick Thugz who are all from Regent Park. He was connected throughout the city at a young age. He released his debut collaborative mixtape 2 Hot 2 Handle in 2012 with Moula 1st, who is also a rapper and producer. Pvrx stopped making music from 2013 but returned in 2016.

=== 2016–2019: Rise to fame, Def Jam signing and 3.14 ===
Pvrx's probation officer recommended he enrol in The Remix Project, a program created to assist disadvantaged youths excel creatively. After hearing his work, Producer Hagler and DJ Agile accepted him into the program. Gavin Sheppard, the founder of the program, played his songs to DJ Joe Kay who connected Pvrx's manager to HBO music supervisor Scott Vener, who placed his song Make It, released June 2016, on the TV series Ballers in Autumn 2016. Vener recommended Pvrx to Paul Rosenberg, CEO of Def Jam Recordings, who met with Pvrx in Toronto and resulted in Pvrx becoming Rosenberg's first signing in November 2017. During this time, it was also rumoured he would be signed to Drake's OVO Sound record label.

Pvrx made his first Def Jam appearance on the compilation album Undisputed alongside YK Osiris, Nimic Revenue, YFL Kelvin, Striiipes amongst others. Pvrx subsequently released the singles Mixed by 40 and Know Me in August, 2018, his first releases on Def Jam.

Pvrx released his debut Extended Play album 3.14 on July 26, 2019. It consisted of 7 songs and was of 28 minutes length. The album was known for being filled with melodies that complement his storytelling lyrics. It contained guest appearances from Dave East & Yung Pinch. The album was supported by 2 singles Make It and Is U Down which amassed over 1 million views in one month of release. It featured production from FrancisGotHeat, Moula 1st, Nineteen85, amongst others. He was featured on 6ixBuzz's compilation album NorthernSound, which was released on December 13, 2019.

=== 2020–present ===
On January 1, 2020, Pvrx released a music video for his song "Nun New". In 2020-2021 he released several songs including the heavily anticipated “Gang Code”, “Drill” and “Silence Is Golden” which was met with incredible reactions commending him on his word play and how he stands out as a singer/rapper and songwriter.

== Discography ==
=== Extended plays ===
- 3.14 (2019)
- Sounds Like Me (2022)

=== Compilation albums ===
- Undisputed (by Def Jam)
- NorthernSound (by 6ixBuzz)
