= Survival (Dave East album) =

Studio album by Dave East
- Released: November 8, 2019
- Genre: Hip hop
- Length: 78:07
- Labels: From the Dirt; Mass Appeal; Def Jam
- Producers: Nas (exec.); Alist Fame; AraabMuzik; Ash; Beat Butcha; BoogzDaBeast; Buda & Grandz; Coop the Truth; CT; DJ Green Lantern; Dylan Graham; iLL Wayno; Justin Zim; King BNJMN; Major Seven; Mike & Keys; Mike Kuz; Motif Alumni; Murda Beatz; Nascent; S. Dot; Shucati; Sool Got Hits; Street Symphony; Swizz Beatz; The Mekanix; Timbaland; V Don; Wisponer

Dave East chronology
| Beloved (2018) | Survival (2019) | Karma 3 (2020) |

Singles from Survival
- 1. "Alone" Released: October 4, 2019

Survival is the debut studio album by American rapper Dave East. It was released on November 8, 2019, through From the Dirt, Mass Appeal Records, and Def Jam Recordings. The album features guest appearances from Teyana Taylor, Rick Ross, Nas, E-40, The-Dream, Fabolous, Gunna, Jacquees, Lil Baby, and Ty Dolla Sign, among others. It was supported by one single: "Alone" featuring Jacquees.

== Background ==
In anticipation of the album, Dave East released a 5-part eponymous titled documentary showing the recording process of the album.

On November 27, 2018, Dave East announced his debut album's title and projected release date, however, it was ultimately delayed.

== Commercial performance ==
Survival debuted at number 11 on the US Billboard 200 chart, earning a total of 24,000 album-equivalent units in its first week of release. The album also debuted at number eight on the US Top R&B/Hip-Hop Albums chart, becoming his third top-ten album on this chart.

== Track listing ==
Credits adapted from Tidal.

| No. | Title | Writer(s) | Producer(s) | Length |
|---|---|---|---|---|
| 1. | "They Wanna Kill You" (featuring DJ Premier) | David Brewster, Jr.; Kasseem Dean; Christopher Martin; Kejuan Muchita; Albert Johnson; Steven Duboff; Arthur Kornfeld | Swizz Beatz | 2:34 |
| 2. | "Penthouse" (featuring J. Black) | Brewster, Jr.; John Groover, Jr.; Michael Cox, Jr.; Jeret Griffin-Black | Mike & Keys | 3:39 |
| 3. | "Godfather 4" (featuring Nas) | Brewster, Jr.; Nasir Jones; James D'Agostino; Tom Brock | DJ Green Lantern | 4:11 |
| 4. | "Need a Sign" (featuring Teyana Taylor) | Brewster, Jr.; Teyana Taylor; Sidney Selby; Shaun Thomas; Corey Thompson; Jahmal Gwin; Dorothy Fields; Jimmy McHugh | AraabMuzik; CT^{[a]}; S. Dot^{[b]}; BoogzDaBeast^{[b]} | 6:23 |
| 5. | "On My Way 2 School" | Brewster, Jr.; Francis Ubiera; Daniel Garcia; Loran Noel; Cooper McGill; Efrain Rodriguez; Jariuce Banks | Buda & Grandz; Coop the Truth; Wisponer; Alist Fame^{[a]}; Justin Zim^{[b]} | 3:33 |
| 6. | "Seventeen" | Brewster, Jr.; Timothy Mosley; Michael Kuzoian; Tim Friedrich; Justin Mosley; Jordan Mosley | Timbaland; Shucati; Mike Kuz^{[b]} | 3:06 |
| 7. | "Mama I Made It" | Brewster, Jr.; Abraham Orellana; Gwin; Jeffrey Allen; Ricky Kinchen; Keirston Lewis; Homer O'Dell; Lawrence Waddell; Stokley Williams | AraabMuzik; BoogzDaBeast^{[a]} | 4:37 |
| 8. | "OG" (featuring Rick Ross and The-Dream) | Brewster, Jr.; Alex Petit; Dwayne Shippy; Terius Nash; William Roberts | Cashmoney AP; iLL Wayno; BoogzDaBeast^{[a]} | 3:41 |
| 9. | "What's Going On" (featuring Fabolous) | Brewster, Jr.; Kuzoian; Ubiera; Garcia; John Jackson; Rahni Harris, Jr. | Mike Kuz; Buda & Grandz | 3:07 |
| 10. | "Baby" | Brewster, Jr.; Kuzoian; Gwin; Anna Gaye; Marvin Gaye; Elgie Stover; Lewis Bethea; Ashley Middleton | BoogzDaBeast; Mike Kuz; Ash^{[b]} | 3:17 |
| 11. | "Alone" (featuring Jacquees) | Brewster Jr.; Rodriguez Broadnax; Omar Walker; Benjamin Singh-Reynolds; Dylan Graham; Donald DeGrate, Jr.; Roger Troutman; Terry Troutman; Gwin | Major Seven; King BNJMN; Graham; BoogzDaBeast^{[a]} | 4:20 |
| 12. | "Everyday" (featuring Gunna) | Brewster, Jr.; Sergio Kitchens; Torrance Esmond; Steven Carless; Askia Fountain | Street Symphony; D.O. Speaks^{[b]}; Mike Kuz^{[b]}; S. Dot^{[b]}; Buda & Grandz^{[b]} | 3:21 |
| 13. | "Devil Eyes" (featuring Mozzy and E-40) | Brewster, Jr.; Earl Stevens; Timothy Patterson; Kuzoian; Dontrell Mayfield; Kenny Tullis, Jr. | The Mekanix; Mike Kuz | 5:21 |
| 14. | "Night Shift" (featuring Lil Baby) | Brewster, Jr.; Shane Lindstrom; Rasool Diaz; Dominique Jones; Steven Carless; Fountain | Murda Beatz; Sool Got Hits | 3:42 |
| 15. | "Wanna Be a G" (featuring Max B) | Brewster, Jr.; Charley Wingate; Eliot Dubock | Beat Butcha | 4:17 |
| 16. | "Me & Mines" (featuring DJ Clue) | Brewster, Jr.; Tivon Key | V Don | 4:05 |
| 17. | "Daddy Knows" (featuring Ash Leone) | Brewster, Jr.; Christopher Ruelas; Jessie Reyez; Thomas; Gwin | Nascent; S. Dot^{[b]}; BoogzDaBeast^{[b]} | 3:21 |
| 18. | "What You Mad At" | Brewster, Jr.; Ubiera; Garcia; Darius Woodley; Kuzoian; Thomas; Middleton; Max Schrager; Deric Angelettie | S. Dot; Buda & Grandz^{[a]}; Woodley^{[b]}; Mike Kuz^{[b]}; Ash^{[b]} | 4:55 |
| 19. | "On Sight" (featuring Ty Dolla Sign) (Bonus) | Brewster, Jr.; Abraham Orellana; Tyrone Griffin, Jr. | AraabMuzik | 2:42 |
| 20. | "The Marathon Continues (Nipsey Tribute)" | Brewster, Jr.; Orellana; Marcus Rucker | AraabMuzik; Motif Alumni^{[a]} | 3:45 |
| Total length: | | | | 78:07 |

Notes

- ^{^[a]} signifies a co-producer
- ^{^[b]} signifies an additional producer
- "Everyday", and "Wanna Be a G" were originally from Dave East's Survival Pacc EP.
- "They Wanna Kill You" features additional vocals by Mike Kuz, Cousin Chet, Hood, and Melvin Brown
- "Penthouse" features additional vocals by Nipsey Hussle
- "Godfather 4" features background vocals by The Soul Rebels
- "Need a Sign" features additional vocals by Dave East's father David Brewster Sr., and Cousin Chet, and background vocals by Desiigner
- "On My Way 2 School" features additional vocals by Jariuce Banks, Faye, and AJ and background vocals by Desiigner
- "Mama I Made It" features additional vocals by Faye
- "What's Goin On" features background vocals by Kali Pop, and additional vocals by Cousin Chet
- "Baby" features additional vocals by Marjorie Aristilde
- "What You Mad At" features additional vocals by Madd Rapper
- "Devil Eyes" features additional vocals by King Drew and Melvin Brown
- "Wanna Be A G" features background vocals by Bibi Bourelly
- "Daddy Knows" features additional vocals by Dave East's daughter Kairi Brewster
- "The Marathon Continues (Nipsey Tribute)" features additional vocals by Snoop Dogg

Sample credits

- "They Wanna Kill You" contains a sample of "Survival of the Fittest", written by Kejuan Muchita and Albert Johnson, and performed by Mobb Deep, and a sample of "The Rain, the Park, and Other Things" written by Steven Duboff and Arthur Kornfeld, and performed by The Cowsills.
- "Godfather 4" contains elements of "I Just Couldn't Take a Goodbye", written by Tom Brock, and performed by Gloria Scott.
- "Mama I Made It" contains a sample of "U Send Me Swingin'" written by Jeffrey Allen, Ricky Kinchen, Keirston Lewis, Homer O'Dell, Lawrence Waddell, and Stokely Williams, and performed by Mint Condition.
- "Baby" contains elements of "Just To Keep You Satisfied" written by Marvin Gaye, Anna Gaye, and Elgie Stover, and performed by Marvin Gaye.
- "Alone" contains an interpolation of "Feenin'", written by Donald DeGrate Jr., and performed by Jodeci.

== Personnel ==
Credits adapted from Tidal.

Performers

- Dave East - primary artist
- Nas - featured artist
- Nipsey Hussle - posthumously featured artist
- Teyana Taylor - featured artist
- Jacquees - featured artist

Musicians

- Maki Athanasiou – electric guitar (tracks 3, 4, 5)
- Keyon Harrold – trumpet (track 3)
- Shaun Thomas – keyboards (tracks 4, 5, 12), guitar (tracks 4, 5), bass guitar, organ, strings (track 4)
- Abraham Orellana – arranger, orchestrator (track 4)
- Timbaland – drums (track 6)
- Luca Starz – keyboards (track 6)
- Tim Friedrich – flute (track 6)
- Jordan Mosley – flute (track 6)
- Justin Mosley – flute (track 6)
- Dwayne Shippy – keyboard (track 8)

Technical

- Michael Kuzoian – recording (all tracks), mixing (tracks 1, 2, 4, 6–14, 16–20)
- Garnett Flynn – recording (track 2)
- Dwayne "iLL Wayno" Shippy – recording (track 3)
- Mike Snell – recording (track 4)
- Todd Hurtt – recording (track 15)
- Najee "Sonny" Lane – recording (track 17)
- Mark "Exit" Goodchild – mixing (track 3)
- Chris Gehringer – mastering (tracks 3, 11, 16)

== Charts ==
| Chart (2019) | Peak position |
|---|---|
| Canadian Albums (Billboard) | 50 |
| US Billboard 200 | 11 |
| US Top R&B/Hip-Hop Albums (Billboard) | 8 |
| US Top Rap Albums (Billboard) | 7 |
