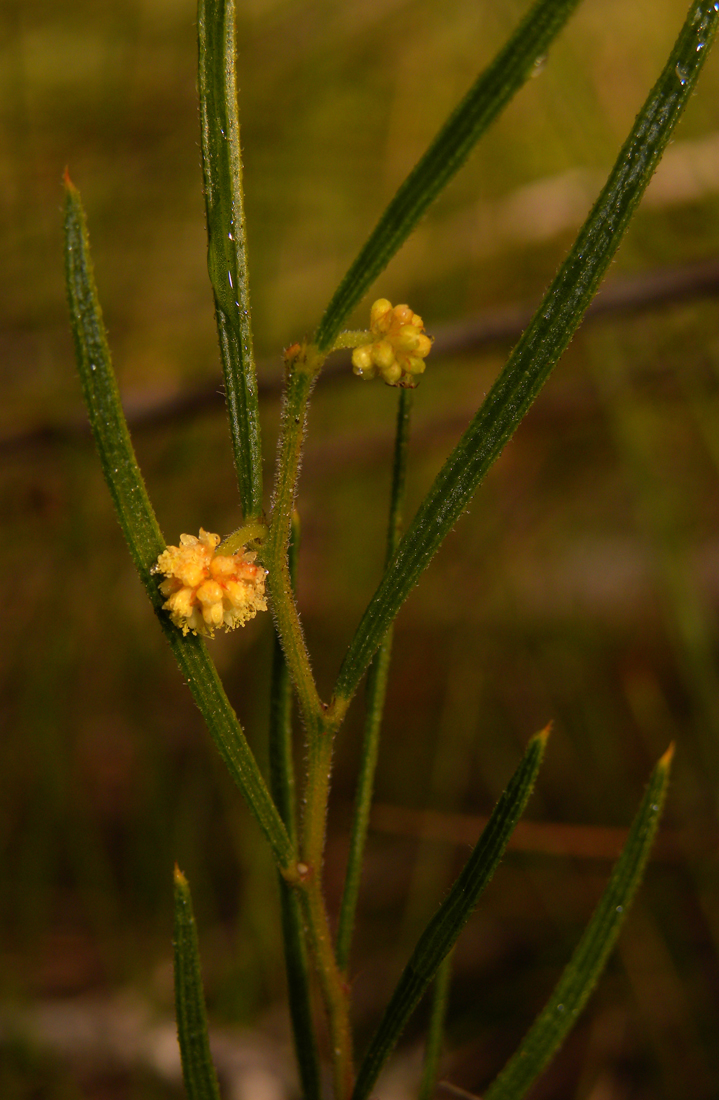

Conservation status
- Vulnerable (EPBC Act)

Scientific classification
- Kingdom: Plantae
- Clade: Tracheophytes
- Clade: Angiosperms
- Clade: Eudicots
- Clade: Rosids
- Order: Fabales
- Family: Fabaceae
- Subfamily: Caesalpinioideae
- Clade: Mimosoid clade
- Genus: Acacia
- Species: A. bynoeana

Binomial name
- Acacia bynoeana Benth.
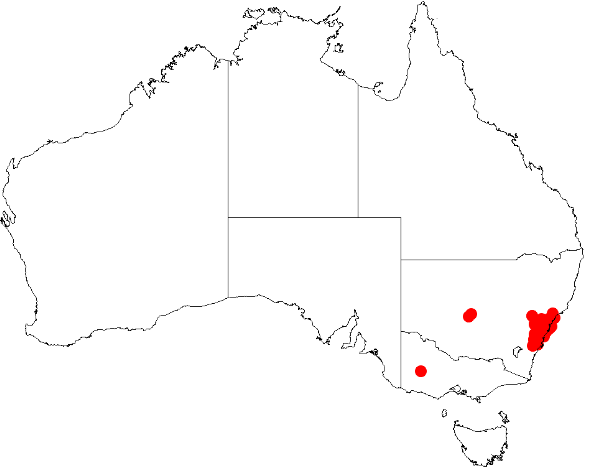
- Occurrence data from AVH

Synonyms
- Acacia pumila Maiden & R.T.Baker; Racosperma bynoeanum (Benth.) Leslie Pedley

= Acacia bynoeana =

Tiny wattle

Species of legume

Acacia bynoeana, known colloquially as Bynoe's wattle or tiny wattle, is a species of flowering plant in the family Fabaceae and is endemic to New South Wales, Australia. It is a low-lying shrub with narrowly elliptic to linear phyllodes, spherical heads of light golden yellow flowers, and tapered, firmly papery to crust-like pods.

== Description ==
Acacia bynoeana is a low-lying shrub that typically grows to a height of up to 30–50 cm (12–20 in) and has ribbed branchlets. Its phyllodes are leathery, narrowly elliptic to linear, mostly 10–50 mm (0.39–1.97 in) long, 1–3 mm (0.039–0.118 in) wide and often curved with a more or less sharp point on the end. There are stipules up to 1.5 mm (0.059 in) long at the base of the phyllodes. The phyllodes are hairy when young but become glabrous with age. The flowers are borne in a spherical head 3.5–4 mm (0.14–0.16 in) in diameter in axils, on a peduncle 2–6 mm (0.079–0.236 in) long. Each head contains 10 to 25 light golden yellow flowers. Flowering occurs in summer and the pods are firmly papery to crust-like and straight, up to 30 mm (1.2 in) long and 3–4 mm (0.12–0.16 in) wide with oblong, mottled brown seeds 4.0–4.5 mm (0.16–0.18 in) long with a thick aril.

== Taxonomy ==
Acacia bynoeana was first formally described in 1855 by the botanist George Bentham in the journal Linnaea from specimens collected by Benjamin Bynoe. The specific epithet honours Benjamin Bynoe, the Royal Navy surgeon aboard the Beagle who collected the type specimen.

== Distribution ==
Bynoe's wattle is found in New South Wales mostly from around the Morisett area in the north down to Berrima and the Illawarra region and out to the west as far as the Blue Mountains with another population found in the Hunter Valley and Morton National Park. It grows well in sandy soils as a part of heathland and dry sclerophyll forest communities.

== Conservation status ==
Acacia bynoeana is listed as "vulnerable" under the Australian Government Environment Protection and Biodiversity Conservation Act 1999 and as "endangered" under the New South Wales Government Biodiversity Conservation Act.

== See also ==
- List of Acacia species
