= Akheim Allen =

British rapper (born 1992)

- Akheim Allen performing on stage at the HMV Institute, Birmingham on 28 April 2012

Background information
- Also known as: PW
- Born: Akheim Allen; 30 May 1992 (age 34); London, England
- Genre: British hip hop
- Occupation: Rapper
- Years active: 2010–present
- Label: All About The Melody/Base N Rebulz Entertainment
- Website: akheimallen.com

Akheim Allen (born 30 May 1992) is a British rapper. He is of Grenadian and Jamaican descent. One of eight children, Allen was nicknamed "Pee Wee"—later shortened to PW—by his older brother due to his height when he was younger.

== Career ==
Akheim started rapping at the age of 13. After uploading videos to YouTube in 2010 PW began to attract more attention, with plays on BBC Radio 1Xtra, Choice FM and Capital.

Akheim supported Dappy on his 2011 UK tours, as well as embarking on a solo school tour. In 2012, PW opened for Conor Maynard and Mindless Behavior on tour, and the video for his track 'Single' was playlisted on major music TV channels, as well as Channel 4's Freshly Squeezed and video of the week on Kiss TV. PW Also helps out with a road safety campaign called "One road, Many users". He goes with the special team and performs in front of school children.

Akheim released a free EP through SB.TV entitled FromPWithLve on Valentine's Day 2013, and the popularity of the track Here With You prompted the song to be released as PW's official debut single on 27 May 2013.

== Awards and nominations ==
=== BEFFTA Awards ===
Akheim has one BEFFTA nomination.

| Year | Nominee / work | Award | Result |
|---|---|---|---|
| 2011 | PW | Best Male Act | Nominated |

== Discography ==
=== Singles ===
| Title | Year | Peak chart positions |
| Title | Year | UK |
|---|---|---|
| "On My Way" | 2012 | — |
| "I Swear" (featuring Scorcher) | 2015 | — |

=== Mixtapes ===
- 2011: New Kid on the Block
- 2013: FromPWithLve
