= 3.14 (EP) =

EP by Pvrx
- Released: July 26, 2019
- Recorded: 2016–19
- Genre: Hip hop
- Length: 28:07
- Label: Def Jam
- Producer: Akeel Henry; Batista the Producer; FrancisGotHeat; GiAngelo Power; Jessy Aaron; Jmak; Moula 1st; Nineteen85; SLMN; Tay Lewis

Singles from 3.14
- 1. "Make it" Released: June 10, 2017; 2. "Is U Down" Released: March 1, 2019

3.14 is the debut EP by Canadian rapper Pvrx. It was released on July 26, 2019, by Def Jam Recordings.

== Background ==
The EP consists of 7 songs and is 28 minutes long. The album was known for being filled with melodies that complement his storytelling lyrics. It contained guest appearances from Dave East & Yung Pinch. The album was supported by 2 singles, Make It and Is U Down. His single Make It which appears on this album also appeared on a compilation album meant to showcase Def Jam’s new group of signees. Canadian music mag Exclaim! describes Pvrx as "Dynamic" and describes him on this EP as an artist who can dramatically shift in his sound. Adding that PVRX describes a larger rounded image of Toronto's socio-economic inequality whilst also giving sound to a generation of the children of the town on a bigger scale. The streams on the EP surpassed 400,000 plays on Spotify within the first month. The music video for "Nun New" was released on January 1, 2020.

=== Promotion ===
In promotion of his EP, Pvrx released The Formula, a short film in promotion of 3.14. The documentary contained appearances from Rexdale natives Kardinal Offishall and Jelleestone. It was an eight-minute documentary which brings the viewer behind the views of Pvrx’s progress and provides an internal look into his journey and where he is today.

== Critical reception ==
Professional ratings
Review scores
Source	Rating
Exclaim!	9/10 stars

Canadian music mag Exclaim! gave the album a 9/10. Riley Wallace describing Pvrx as an artist who perfectly represents Toronto's socio-economic disparity on an American platform. He went on to say that Pvrx bleeds emotion into every song on the EP.

== Track listing ==
Credits adapted from Tidal.

No.	Title	Writer(s)	Producer(s)	Length
1.	"Make It"	Daniel Dove; Akeel Henry; Daniel Batista	Henry; Batista the Producer	3:31
2.	"Stay with Me"	Dove; Anthony Jefferies	Nineteen85	3:25
3.	"Nun New"	Dove; Jefferies; Henry; Jevonn Smith; Tiara Thomas	Nineteen85; Moula 1st; Henry	4:04
4.	"Fortune"	Dove; Mohamed Sulaiman; Taychoume Lewis; Yuri Koller	SLMN; Tay Lewis	3:12
5.	"Is U Down" (featuring Dave East)	Dove; David Brewster; Francis Nguyen-Tran; Jean-Baptiste Makolo	FrancisGotHeat; Jmak	4:22
6.	"Sorry in Advance" (featuring Yung Pinch)	Dove; Lewis; Blake Sandoval; Joel St. John	Tay Lewis; GiAngelo Power	3:46
7.	"Militant"	Dove; Lewis; St. John; Jessy Aaron	GiAngelo Power; Aaron	5:44
Total length:				28:07
