= Paranoia: A True Story =

Mixtape by Dave East
- Released: August 18, 2017
- Recorded: 2016–17
- Genre: Hip hop
- Length: 42:42
- Label: Def Jam; Mass Appeal; From The Dirt
- Producer: Nas (exec.); Steven "Steve-O" Carless (exec.); Amadeus; Buda & Grandz; CashMoneyAP; DaSanchize; Harry Fraud; Joe Joe Beats; Nonstop Da Hitman; Reazy Renegade; The Breed

Dave East chronology
Kairi Chanel (2016)	Paranoia: A True Story (2017)	Karma (2017)

Singles from Paranoia: A True Story
- 1. "Perfect" Released: July 28, 2017

Professional ratings
Review scores
Source	Rating
Exclaim!	8/10
Pitchfork	7/10

Paranoia: A True Story is the eleventh mixtape by American rapper Dave East. It was released on August 18, 2017, by Def Jam Recordings, Mass Appeal Records and From The Dirt Records. The mixtape lead single, "Perfect", was released on July 28, 2017. The mixtape features guest appearances from Nas, Jeezy, Wiz Khalifa, French Montana and Chris Brown.

== Background ==
Dave East announced the album's release date on August 2, 2017 via Instagram. Nearly a week later, he unveiled the album's official cover art. Two days before the album's release, the tracklist was revealed.

== Track listing ==
Credits adapted from iTunes and Tidal.

Paranoia: A True Story
No.	Title	Writer(s)	Producer(s)	Length
1.	"Paranoia" (featuring Jeezy)	David Brewster; Gary Fountaine; Jay Jenkins	Nonstop Da Hitman	3:06
2.	"The Hated" (skit)	Demetrius Daniels; Errol Brewster; Darryl Kornegay		3:52
3.	"The Hated" (featuring Nas)	Brewster; Joe Cruz	Joe Joe Beats	4:27
4.	"Phone Jumpin" (featuring Wiz Khalifa)	Brewster; Bryan Johnson; Cameron Thomaz; Bernard Hermann	Reazy Renegade	4:07
5.	"Jazzy" (Interlude)	Daniel Garcia; Francis Ubiera; Jazmine Pena	Buda & Grandz	1:38
6.	"Perfect" (featuring Chris Brown)	Brewster; Christopher Brown; Antwan Thompson; Rashad Johnson; Aaron Rogers	Amadeus; The Breed	5:16
7.	"Found A Way"	Brewster; Alex Petit; CLS Beatz	CashMoneyAP; CLS Beatz	3:53
8.	"Maneuver" (featuring French Montana)	Brewster; Rory William Quigley; Karim Kharbouch; Nasir Jones; Peter Phillips	Harry Fraud	3:29
9.	"Pop's Crazy" (skit)	Brewster; David Brewster Sr.		0:53
10.	"My Dirty Little Secret"	Brewster; Garcia; Saul Sanchez; Cruz; Ubiera	Joe Joe Beats; Buda & Grandz^{[a]}; DaSanchize^{[b]}	3:33
11.	"Kairi Speaks" (skit)	Brewster; Kairi Brewster		1:14
12.	"Wanna Be Me"	Brewster; Cruz	Joe Joe Beats	3:34
13.	"Have You Ever"	Brewster; Garcia; Ubiera; Sanchez; Cruz	Joe Joe Beats; Buda & Grandz^{[a]}; DaSanchize^{[b]}	3:33
Total length:				42:42

Notes

- ^{^[a]} signifies a co-producer
- ^{^[b]} signifies an additional producer
- "Jazzy" features additional vocals from Jazzy Amra
- "Found a Way" features additional vocals from D'anna Stewart
- "Kairi Speaks" features additional vocals from Kairi Brewster
- "Have You Ever" features background vocals from Katrina Russ

== Charts ==
Chart (2017)	Peak position
Canadian Albums (Billboard)	63
US Billboard 200	9
US Top Rap Albums (Billboard)	4
US Top R&B/Hip-Hop Albums (Billboard)	5
