= Dave East =

American rapper (born 1988)

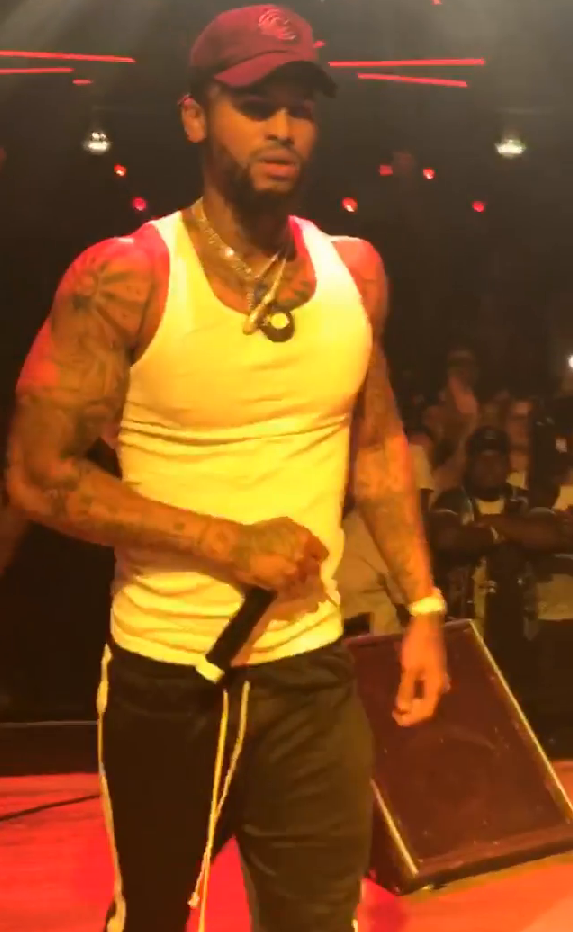
- East in 2017

Background information
- Born: David Lawrence Brewster Jr. June 3, 1988 (age 38); New York City, U.S.
- Genre: East Coast hip-hop
- Occupations: Rapper; songwriter; actor
- Years active: 2007–present
- Labels: From the Dirt; Def Jam; Mass Appeal
- Children: 3
- Website: daveeastmusic.com

David Lawrence Brewster Jr. (born June 3, 1988), known professionally as Dave East, is an American rapper. East began his career in 2010, and gained attention in 2014 for his eighth mixtape, Black Rose. Its release caught the attention of fellow New York rapper Nas, who signed East to a recording contract with his label Mass Appeal Records in 2014, which entered a joint venture with Def Jam Recordings two years later.

In 2016, East was chosen as part of the XXL's Annual Freshman Class. His tenth mixtape, Kairi Chanel, was released in September of that year and peaked at number 38 on the Billboard 200. His eleventh mixtape, Paranoia: A True Story (2017) peaked at number nine on the chart. His debut studio album, Survival (2019) peaked at number 11 and his fifteenth mixtape, Karma 3 (2020) peaked at number 36. His second studio album, Fortune Favors the Bold (2023), failed to chart and served as his final release with Def Jam.

East began an acting career in 2017, when he was cast as himself in Being Mary Jane and The Breaks. He also had a supporting role in the Netflix film Beats (2019) as "Mister Ford". His breakthrough acting role came in the Hulu series Wu-Tang: An American Saga (2019), where he portrays Method Man.

== Early life ==
East was born on June 3 1988, in New York City. He spent his life between East Harlem where his mother resided, and Ravenswood where he lived with his aunt in his late adolescent life. The rapper is of Bajan, Louisiana Creole and Dominican descent. He played basketball, and football at Springbrook High School in Silver Spring, MD near Washington, D.C. Additionally, he played in the Amateur Athletic Union (AAU) with then-future NBA players Ty Lawson, Greivis Vásquez, and developed a close friendship with current all-star Kevin Durant.

== College basketball career ==
After Springbrook High School, East attended the University of Richmond, then transferred to Towson University where he played basketball. While attending Towson, East had ongoing issues with coaching staff which ultimately led to his decision to leave the university. Shortly afterward, he started running into legal trouble in Baltimore, Maryland.

=== Career statistics ===
Year	Team	GP	GS	MPG	FG%	3P%	FT%	RPG	APG	SPG	BPG	PPG
2006–07	Richmond	13	5	16.7	.365	.389	.583	1.7	.4	.7	.3	4.1
2007–08	Towson	Redshirt										
2008–09	Towson	22	5	15.8	.306	.220	.657	1.7	.7	.5	.2	4.6
2009–10	Towson	10	4	16.3	.347	.300	.625	2.5	.2	.4	.2	4.8
Career		45	14	16.2	.330	.293	.636	1.9	.5	.5	.2	4.6

== Career ==
=== 2010–2013: Beginnings ===
In 2010, East released his first mixtape Change of Plans which gained him minor local recognition. He later released the mixtapes Insomnia, American Greed, Don't Sleep and No Regrets, solidifying his commitment to music. In 2013, East periodically sold drugs throughout Harlem to support himself and his music. He then released his sixth mixtape, Gemini in April of that year.

=== 2014–2016: Mass Appeal signing and Kairi Chanel ===
In 2014, East's music caught the attention of Nas, who soon looked for ways to contact East. Unbeknownst to Nas, East was close friends with Nas' younger brother and fellow rapper Jungle, who quickly introduced the two. By mid-2014, East was signed to Nas through his newfound record label, Mass Appeal Records. In July 2014, he released his seventh mixtape, Black Rose for the label, which received favorable critical reception. In 2015, he released his eighth mixtape Hate Me Now, which gained further recognition and high-profile guest appearances from label boss Nas, as well as Pusha T, and two-thirds of The Lox; Jadakiss and Styles P.

In June 2016, XXL magazine revealed their annual Freshman Class for 2016, which included East, along with G Herbo, 21 Savage, Kodak Black, Lil Uzi Vert, Lil Yachty, Desiigner, Lil Dicky, Denzel Curry, and Anderson Paak. The following month, he performed on the Freshman Cypher along with G Herbo, hosted by Philadelphia-based disc jockey, DJ Drama. In August 2016, he released a joint extended play with rapper Kur titled Born Broke, Die Rich. In September 2016, East performed at the BET Hip Hop Awards cypher alongside Young M.A., Ms. Jade, Kur and Sam Black. In September 2016, he signed a joint venture record deal with Def Jam Recordings negotiated by hop executive Steven "Steve-O" Carless, and the next day released the mixtape Kairi Chanel, which peaked at number 38 on the US Billboard 200.

=== 2017–2018: Acting debut and Paranoia 2 ===
In January 2017, East made his acting debut, starring in BET's Being Mary Jane series. He later appeared in Puma's Tsugi Shinsei commercial and starred in rapper, Trina's "It Ain't Me" music video. In August 2017, East released his the EP, Paranoia: A True Story, supported by the singles "Perfect" featuring singer Chris Brown, "Paranoia" along with Jeezy, and "Phone Jumpin" with Wiz Khalifa. The EP peaked at number nine on the Billboard 200. Later in the year East then released his eleventh mixtape, Karma which was hosted by DJ Holiday. This was the beginning of the Karma series. This tape featured tracks such as "Militant" with Bronx rapper, Don Q. Chris Brown also reappeared on "Bentley Truck" track which was also featured on the Karma tape. In September 2017, East hosted the first annual Goldie Awards, a DJ and producer battle set taking place in New York City.

East began the new year by releasing his twelfth mixtape Paranoia 2. on January 15, 2018. In the following month, East signed a sponsorship with Belaire Rose. The signing of this deal led up to a promotional music video for the brand with his song, "Fresh Prince of Belaire" by Rick Ross featuring East. March 2018, East signed an endorsement deal with New Era Cap launching his new "lifestyle" 59fifty fitted collection. Shortly after his newly found endorsement, East was featured in New Era's "Claim the Crown" commercial along with some of the top MLB players Javier Báez and Jose Altuve, as well as record producer, Mike Will Made It. As things continued to look up for East, he released his thirteenth mixtape, Karma 2 on July 27, 2018. The project mixtape featured artists including Lil Durk, Gunna and BlocBoy JB, as well as close affiliates Kiing Shooter and Border Buck. Although the project failed to reach the same success as his studio album, managed to peak at number 41 on the Billboard 200. In the same calendar year, he released his fifteenth mixtape, Beloved, which saw him join his personal-favorite rapper, Styles P. The tape exposed and expressed the gritty street life of New York City.

=== 2019–2021: Survival and Karma 3 ===
East made his movie debut in the Netflix film Beats (2019) in which he had a supporting role as "Mister Ford". His breakthrough acting role came in the Hulu series Wu-Tang: An American Saga (2019) where he portrays Method Man as a series regular. In September 2019, it was confirmed that East would have a supporting role in the film Boogie (2021). After a night in Las Vegas gone wrong, East was pulled from the film. The role of "Monk" was recast and eventually played by Pop Smoke.

In 2019, East was featured on the single "Is U Down" by Pvrx and appeared as a guest vocalist on the single "Taxin" by DJ Shadow. He released a two part promotional release titled Survival Pacc with the singles "Everyday" featuring Gunna on and "Wanna Be a G" featuring Max B on August 1, 2019, as a pre-release for his debut album. On October 4, 2019, he released the single "Alone" featuring Jacquees to support the release of his then upcoming debut album. He released the album, Survival, on November 8, 2019, through Def Jam Recordings, Mass Appeal Records, and his own label From the Dirt. It features guest appearances from Teyana Taylor, Rick Ross, Nas, The-Dream, Lil Baby, amongst others. East also started his first world tour in release of the album, titled the Survival Tour which spanned from November 22, 2019 — December 20, 2019.

On March 8, 2020, East announced that he was working on the third installment in the Karma series of mixtapes. The mixtape cover featured background images of East with the now late rappers Nipsey Hussle and Pop Smoke, and East stated that he and Nipsey were making plans to create a collaborative project prior to his death. The album was initially set to be titled Thoughts of a Menace, however it was changed to simply Karma 3. Like his previous album, it was released via Def Jam and Mass Appeal. He released the lead single of the mixtape, "Really wit Me", on March 12, 2020. Numerous people, including Korey Wise made a cameo in the music video. Karma 3 was released on August 14, 2020, to critical acclaim. A deluxe version of the mixtape followed on October 23, 2020, with features from Dej Loaf, Junior Reid, Chris Brown and G Herbo, as well as the "Handsome" remix featuring Jeezy.

On July 30, 2021, East and producer Harry Fraud released a collaborative album titled Hoffa. That same year, he purchased a storefront in his hometown, and plans to open additional businesses.

=== 2022-2025: Various collaboration albums ===
In a January 2022 interview with Vibe, East revealed he had been working on various projects, which he intends to release in the year, the first of which will be Beloved 2, a sequel to his 2018 joint-album with Styles P. He also said his next solo project with Def Jam/Mass Appeal will likely be released in February or March. He also confirmed a follow-up to Survival.

In 2023, Dave East left Def Jam and went back to releasing music independently.

== Artistry ==
East is known for his raw lyricism and dark storytelling about street life. He is influenced by, Styles P, Jadakiss, Eminem, Cam'ron, Big Pun, Nas, The Notorious B.I.G., Raekwon, DMX, Tupac, Snoop Dogg and The Diplomats.

== Personal life ==
East as a teen joined the Rollin' 30s Harlem Crips, a subset of the larger Crips gang. East started serving a prison sentence, and during this time he converted to Islam and considered himself a Muslim. Commenting on his conversion, East stated; "Islam really brought a discipline to my life that I didn't really have before... My old mindset was if they ain't helping me, I ain't helping them, but you can't live life that way." East has three daughters with Milagrito "Millie" Colon, Kairi Chanel Brewster born in 2016 and Kobi Chanai Brewster born in 2020. In an Instagram post from August 2025, he posted his youngest daughter Kasey Celine as she just celebrated her first birthday.

In 2024, an investigation by Rolling Stone listed Dave East among several artists whose verified accounts allegedly solicited money from independent musicians for promotion deals that were never carried out.

== Discography ==
- Survival (2019)
- Fortune Favors the Bold (2023)
- Karma 4 (2025)

== Filmography ==
Film
Year	Title	Role
2019	Beats	Mister Ford

Television series
Year	Title	Role	Notes
2017	Being Mary Jane	Himself	Episode: "Getting Nekkid"
2017	The Breaks	Hashim	Episode: "Under Pressure"
2019–2023	Wu Tang: An American Saga	Shotgun/Method Man	Series Regular
2020	Ridiculousness	Himself	Season 16, Episode 5
2021	Dave	Himself	Season 2, Episode 7

== Awards and nominations ==
Year	Award	Category	Work	Result
2017	BMI R&B/Hip-Hop Awards	Social Star	Himself	Nominated
2023	Grammy Awards	Album of the Year	Good Morning Gorgeous (Deluxe) (as a featured artist)	Nominated

== See also ==
- List of Afro-Latinos
- List of people from Harlem
