= List of Wu-Tang Clan affiliate albums =

This is a list of albums, mixtapes and EPs released by artists affiliated with the Wu-Tang Clan. The artists are known as Wu-Tang Affiliates or the Killa Beez.

== Discography ==
Title	Artist	Release date	Label	Ref.
United We Slam	Spark 950 & Timbo King	February 1, 1994	Street Life Records, Scotti Bros. Records	
AKA the Rugged Child	Shyheim	April 19, 1994	Virgin/EMI Records	
6 Feet Deep	Gravediggaz	August 9, 1994	Gee Street/Island/PolyGram Records	
The Lost Generation	Shyheim	May 28, 1996	Noo Trybe/Virgin/EMI Records	
4th Disciple	4th Disciple	June 30, 1996	Big Brother Music	
Silent Weapons for Quiet Wars	Killarmy	August 5, 1997	Wu-Tang/Priority/EMI Records	
The Pick, the Sickle and the Shovel	Gravediggaz	October 14, 1997	Gee Street/V2/BMG Records	
The Pillage	Cappadonna	1998	Razor Sharp Records/Epic Street	
The Sunz of Man Mixtape	Sunz of Man	1998	Red Ant Entertainment	
Take Ya Time EP	Shabazz the Disciple	1998	Red Hook Records	
Don't Go Against the Grain	GP Wu	January 27, 1998	MCA Records	
Heavy Mental	Killah Priest	March 10, 1998	Geffen/MCA Records	
The Last Shall Be First	Sunz of Man	July 21, 1998	Red Ant/BMG Records	
Wu-Tang Killa Bees: The Swarm	Wu-Tang Killa Bees	July 21, 1998	Wu-Tang/Priority/EMI Records	
Dirty Weaponry	Killarmy	August 11, 1998	Wu-Tang/Priority/EMI Records	
The Prophecy	Buddha Monk	October 20, 1998	Edel Records	
Antidote	Deadly Venoms	October 20, 1998	A&M/PolyGram Records	
Heist of the Century	La the Darkman	November 17, 1998	Supreme Team Records	
Steel Valley Project	4th Disciple	1999	Steel Valley	
Pop Da Brown Hornet EP	Pop Da Brown Hornet	January 19, 1999	Smoke Records	
The First Testament	Sunz of Man	January 31, 1999	Red Hook Records	
Wu-Chronicles	Various	March 23, 1999	Wu-Tang/Priority/EMI Records	
Wu-Syndicate	Wu-Syndicate	April 21, 1999	Wu-Tang/Priority/EMI Records	
Manchild	Shyheim	November 2, 1999	Wu-Tang/Priority/EMI Records	
Pretty Thugs	Deadly Venoms	2000	DreamWorks/Interscope/Universal Records	
Ghost Dog: The Way of the Samurai (soundtrack)	Various	April 11, 2000	Razor Sharp/Epic/SME Records	
View from Masada	Killah Priest	May 9, 2000	MCA/Universal Records	
Yesterday, Today, Iz Tomorrow	Royal Fam	July 3, 2000	Wu-Tang/Priority/EMI Records	
The Undaground Emperor	Pop da Brown Hornet	September 12, 2000	MCA/Universal Records	
Visions of the 10th Chamber	Popa Wu	October 31, 2000	Stargate Records	
King of New York EP	Solomon Childs	2000	MP3.com	
The Yin and the Yang	Cappadonna	2001	Razor Sharp Records/Epic	
New York's Most Wanted	Ruthless Bastardz	2001	Chambermusik/Inscarcerated Entertainment	
Ten Tigers Of Kwantung	Moongod Allah	2001	Ringz & Partners Entertainment Group	
1st Amendment	Othorized F.A.M.	2001	Self-released	
The Genuine Article	Remedy	May 1, 2001	Fifth Angel Records	
When All Hell Breaks Loose	Hell Razah	June 26, 2001	Ghetto Government	
The Mental Chambers	Cilvaringz	July 1, 2001	Ringz Family Music	
Wu-Chronicles, Chapter 2	Various	July 3, 2001	Wu-Tang/Priority/EMI Records	
Priesthood	Killah Priest	July 10, 2001	Proverbs Music/Artemis/Koch Records	
Fear, Love & War	Killarmy	September 11, 2001	36/Loud/Relativity Records	
Hell Razed Us	Hell Razah	2002	N/A	
This One	Joe Mafia	2002	58 West Diamond Street Records	
Return Of The Ten Tigers	Moongod Allah	2002	Ringz & Partners Entertainment Group	
Invisible Army	Soul Kid Klik	2002	Yalloppin Entertainment/Soul Kid Records/Chambermusik	
Journals from a Desert Planet	G-Clef Da Mad Komposa	2002	Yalloppin Entertainment/Soul Kid Records/Chambermusik	
Deja Wu	Cilvaringz	2002	RPEG	
Wu-Tang Killa Beez: The Sting	Various	March 12, 2002	Koch Records	
Nightmare in A-Minor	Gravediggaz	April 9, 2002	Empire Musicwerks/BMG Records	
Nightmares That Surface From Shallow Sleep	Warcloud	April 2002	Skarekrow Music	
Protect Ya Neck Collection	Various	April 26, 2002	Protect Ya Neck Records	
Welcome EP	Killah Priest	May 28, 2002	Opius Media	
Tera Iz Him	Dom Pachino	June 1, 2002	Napalm Recordings	
Smuggling Booze in the Graveyard	Warcloud	June 2002	BMG	
Still Standing	Deadly Venoms	June 25, 2002	Rocks the World/Caroline/Virgin/EMI Records	
Saviorz Day	Sunz of Man	September 3, 2002	Rivera Records	
This One	Joe Mafia	October 10, 2002	58 West Diamond Street Records	
Fear is the Mind Killer	Rayzd	2003	Chambermusik	
The Struggle	Cappadonna	2003	Code Red Entertainment	
Inmates to the Fire...	Sunz of Man	2003	WTCKillaBeeZ, Inc.	
The Black Market – The Mix Tape Vol. 1 – The Dead Street Scrolls	Killah Priest & Tragedy Khadafi	2003	N/A	
Gangsta Chronicles	Timbo King	2003	Fort Knox Records	
Pro's Laboratory	Warcloud & The Professional	2003	Pro's Laboratory Records	
Code: Red	Remedy	January 21, 2003	Code Red Entertainment	
Life	Frukwan	February 4, 2003	BMG	
Every Night is a Black Knight	Black Knights	March 2003	Black Ball Entertainment	
Granddaddy Flow	9th Prince	May 28, 2003	Armyourself Entertainment	
Black August	Killah Priest	July 8, 2003	Artemis Records	
Love, Hell or Right	Mathematics	August 26, 2003	High Times Records	
The Book of Shabazz (Hidden Scrollz)	Shabazz the Disciple	October 7, 2003	BattleAxe Records	
Black August Revisited	Killah Priest	October 2003	Think Differently Music/Babygrande Records	
The Horsemen Project	The HRSMN	October 20, 2003	Think Differently Music/Babygrande Records	
Pro's Laboratory	Warcloud & The Professional	December 2003	X-Ray Records	
G-Clef's Drama Breaks	G-Clef	2004	Yalloppin Entertainment/Soul Kid Records/Chambermusik	
Years Months Dayz	Royal Fam	2004	N/A	
71Raw Project	71Raw	2004	Chambermusik	
Earth Power	Makeba Mooncycle	2004	Nyamu Recordings/Chambermusik	
Nothing New Under the Sun	Sunz of Man	2004	N/A	
Throw Black Series Part 1	Timbo King	2004	Fort Knox Records	
Live From Amsterdam	Timbo King	2004	Fort Knox Records	
Throw Black Series Part 2	Timbo King	2004	Fort Knox Records	
Funeral Talk (The Eulogy)	Solomon Childs	2004	Chambermusik, Yalloppin Entertainment, Soulkid Records	
Unreleased	Dom Pachino	January 2004	Napalm Recordings	
Bobby Digital Presents Northstar	Northstar	January 20, 2004	Koch Records	
U-GODZILLA presents the Hillside Scramblers	Hillside Scramblers	March 16, 2004	Synergy Music	
6 Feet Under	Gravediggaz	March 30, 2004	X-Ray/Cleopatra Records	
Wu-Tang Collective	Various	April 29, 2004	Empire Music	
Elements	Sunz of Man	July 13, 2004	X-Ray/Cleopatra Records	
718	Theodore Unit	August 3, 2004	Sure Shot Recordings	
The Catalog 1994-2004	Shyheim	October 2004	Bottom Up Records	
Domination	Dom Pachino	October 2004	Napalm Recordings	
Freedom of Speech	4th Disciple, Hell Razah	October 26, 2004	X-Ray/Cleopatra Records	
The Greatest Story Never Told	Shyheim	December 2004	Bottom Up Records	
Project Oblivion	Dungeon Masta	2005	Chambermusik/Duck-Lo Records	
For the Streets Mixtape Vol. 1	Ill Knob	2005	Flawless Entertainment/Chambermusik	
Out of the Blue	Blue Raspberry	2005	Chambermusik	
West Coast Killa Beez	Northstar	2005	Chambermusik Special Products/Northsteezar Records	
I Came to Warna Brotha	Babyface Fensta	2005	Chambermusik/Duck-Lo Records	
Balance	Makeba Mooncycle	2005	Chambermusik	
Now Justice	Zu Ninjaz	2005	Chambermusik/Duck-Lo Records/Kamakaze Records	
Da Nightmare B4 X-Mas EP	Da Monstar Mob	2005	Skarekrow Music/SKM Music/Deep Waterz/Chambermusik Special Products	
Put It On The Line	Ghostface Killah & Trife Da God	2005	Starks Enterprises	
No Power on Earth	King Just	2005	Chambermusik	
The Revival	Anthai the Protagonist	2005	Chambermusik	
Wu-South	Cappadonna	2005	Chambermusik	
Prophecy Reloaded	Buddha Monk	2005	Chambermusik, Duck-Lo Records	
The Prophecy Revisited	Buddha Monk	2005	Chambermusik, Duck-Lo Records	
Black Presidents Mixtape Vol. 1	Hell Razah	2005	N/A	
My Life: Heaven and Hell	Hell Razah	2005	N/A	
Rapid Refund Mixtape	Hell Razah	2005	N/A	
Black Castle	Royal Fam	2005	Nature Sounds	
Power of Words	Timbo King	2005	Fort Knox Records	
Throw Black Series 3	Timbo King	2005	Fort Knox Records, Two Train Productions	
Throw Black Series 3 & 4	Timbo King	2005	Fort Knox Records, Two Train Productions	
Napalm World	Team Napalm	January 14, 2005	Napalm Recordings	
Black Market Militia	Black Market Militia	March 22, 2005	Nature Sounds	
Zu-Chronicles Vol. 1: Throwbacks	Buddha Monk	March 30, 2005	Duck-Lo Records	
Blood Sweat & Years	Hidden Aspects presents Bolo's Kitchen	May 3, 2005	Hidden Aspects Music/Chambermusik	
A Heap Of Broken Images	Blue Sky Black Death	May 23, 2006	Mush Records	
Monster Reborn Vol. 1	Y-Kim the Illfigure	June 7, 2005	Sick-Main Records	
Return of the Prodigal Sunn	Prodigal Sunn	June 21, 2005	Free Agency Recordings	
Street Education	Streetlife	June 21, 2005	X-Ray/Cleopatra Records	
The Problem	Mathematics	June 28, 2005	Nature Sounds	
Northstar presents: West Coast Killa Beez	Northstar	July 13, 2005	N/A	
The Upgraded Edition Vol. 1	Timbo King	July 25, 2005	Fort Knox Records	
The Arsenal	Dom Pachino	August 12, 2005	Napalm Recordings	
Super Sista	Njeri Earth	September 27, 2005	Earth's Rotation Records	
Wu-Tang Meets the Indie Culture	Various	October 14, 2005	Think Differently Music/Babygrande Records	
Operation Warfare	Dom Pachino	October 14, 2005	Napalm Recordings	
Throw Black Series Vol.3 & 4	Timbo King	October 14, 2005	N/A	
Wu-Tang Meets the Indie Culture	Dreddy Kruger Presents...Think Differently Music	October 18, 2005	Think Differently Music, Babygrande Records	
Zu-Chronicles Vol. 2: Like Father, Like Son	Buddha Monk	October 30, 2005	Duck-Lo Records	
The Grunge Compilation	Dom Pachino	November 2, 2005	Napalm Recordings	
Out of the Blue	Blue Raspberry	December 8, 2005	Chambermusik	
The Invasion	Team Napalm	December 21, 2005	Napalm Recordings	
The History Of Dreddy Kruger Vol. 1	Dreddy Kruger	2006	N/A	
Gunz an Glory (A Soldier Story)	P.R. Terrorist	2006	Napalm Recordings/Chambermusik	
Wu-Affiliated Chamber	DJ Mo'Fire	2006	N/A	
Witty Unpredictable Talent And Natural Game	Dreddy Kruger	2006	N/A	
The Greatest Story Never Told	Black Jesus	2006	Chambermusik Special Products	
What I Got 2 Lose?	Fes Taylor	2006	Chambermusik/Two 4 War Entertainment	
Warning We Are At War!	Fes Taylor	2006	Chambermusik	
Artillery Portraits & Masterpieces	Timbo King	2006	N/A	
Innocent Till Proven Guilty	Fes Taylor presents Shadow Government	2006	Chambermusik	
Drop City S.I.M.P.S.O.N. (Staten Island Most Popular Son)	Lounge Lo	2006	Chambermusik	
Moneta	Two 4 War & Fes Taylor	2006	Chambermusik	
Throwback Classics	Makeba Mooncycle	2006	Chambermusik Special Products	
Hell Has A Face	Dungeon Masta presents Morbid Society	2006	Chambermusik/Soh-Lo Records	
A Prelude to the Offering	Killah Priest	2006	N/A	
Operation Takeover	Da Monstar Mob	2006	Skarekrow Music/Chambermusik	
M*A*S*H	Fes Taylor presents The Warriors	2006	Chambermusik/Two 4 War Entertainment	
Brain Food	Popa Chief	2006	Chambermusik/Burnt Bizkut Productz	
Worldwide 2.0	Popa Chief	2006	Chambermusik/Burnt Biskut Productz	
Burn Babylon Burn	Hell Razah	2006	Self-released	
The King Kong of New York	Solomon Childs	2006	Chambermusik	
Learn My Name	Solomon Childs	2006	Chambermusik	
The Wake	Solomon Childs	January 2, 2006	Chambermusik	
The Passion of the Hood Christ	Shabazz the Disciple	January 20, 2006	Block Exchange	
Passion of Christ EP	Christ Bearer	March 2006	Chambermuzik	
The Old Testament	Sunz of Man	April 4, 2006	Green Streets Entertainment	
9000 Miles	Dragonfly	April 11, 2006	Hidden Aspects Music/Chambermusik	
Zu-Chronicles Vol. 3: Unleash the Fury	Buddha Monk	April 2006	Duck-Lo Records	
4 Security Reasons	Dom Pachino	May 23, 2006	Napalm Recordings	
The Great Migration	Bronze Nazareth	May 23, 2006	Babygrande Records	
Soul of a Man	Mathematics	June 13, 2006	Nature Sounds	
Revelations 1:1	Hidden Aspects	July 7, 2006	Hidden Aspects Entertainment	
Renewed History	Begga Ooh	July 7, 2006	Hidden Aspects Music/Chambermusik	
Addiction Services	Yukon Black	August 6, 2006	Hidden Aspects Music/Chambermusik	
The 45 King	Sean Wigs	August 25, 2006	Chambermusik	
Blue Sky Black Death presents: The Holocaust	Blue Sky Black Death	September 5, 2006	Babygrande Records	
Learn My Name	Solomon Childs	September 14, 2006	Chambermusik	
Best of Napalm Recordings	Dom Pachino	September 22, 2006	Napalm Recordings	
Gunz An Glory: A Soldier Story	P.R. Terrorist	November 20, 2006	Chambermusik	
Black Castle	Royal Fam	December 2006	Capitol Records/Nature Sounds	
Queens Hall of Science	Lost Secret	2007	Yalloppin Entertainment/Soul Kid Records/Chambermusik	
10th Anniversary	Killarmy & Co Defendants	2007	Vam Music Group	
Natural Selection Vol. 2	Nature Sounds	Nature Sounds	2007	
Manchuz Dynasty (Zu-Chronicles Vol. 4)	Da Manchuz	2007	Duck-Lo Records/Chambermusik	
Now That's What I Call Hip-Hop!	Dreddy Kruger	2007	N/A	
Zu-Chronicles Vol. 5: Back Then	Buddha Monk & Popa Wu	2007	Chambermusik, Duck-Lo Records	
Freedom of Speech: Classic Edition	Hell Razah & 4th Disciple	2007	Chambermusik Special Products	
20-20	Njeri Earth	2007	Earth Recording Co	
Dead Presidents	La the Darkman & Willie the Kid	2007	CMP Entertainment	
The A&R Experience	Dreddy Kruger	2007	N/A	
Simpstonian Institute	Lounge Lo	2007	Chambermusik	
Gods of War Part One	Black Jesus & Don Kundalini	2007	Chambermusik Special Products	
Have Sword, Will Travel	Cilvaringz	2007	Chambermusik	
Taylor Made	Fes Taylor	2007	Chambermusik	
King of Hearts	Heart Foundation	2007	Chambermusik	
Needles, Thread & Fabric	Fes Taylor	2007	Chambermusik	
The Art of Making Love & War	Solomon Childs	2007	Chambermusik	
Wu Empire	Imperial Skillz Empera	1 January 2007	Horror Chamber	
Wisemen Arrived	Wisemen	7 January 2007	Black Day In July	
Mathematics presents Wu-Tang Clan & Friends Unreleased	Mathematics	February 7, 2007	Nature Sounds	
Let Freedom Reign	Freemurda	February 20, 2007	N/A	
Renaissance Child	Hell Razah	February 20, 2007	Nature Sounds	
Wisemen Approaching	Wisemen	February 27, 2007	Babygrande Records	
I	Cilvaringz	April 9, 2007	Babygrande Records	
Death's Birth: The Grip of Behemoths	The Unknown (Bronze Nazareth & Kevlaar 7)	June 5, 2007	Chambermusik Special Products	
The Kryme Wave	Kryme Life	June 8, 2007	Babygrande Records	
The Best of 740: Vol. 1	4th Disciple	June 18, 2007	Blakglobe Records	
Crime and Punishment in America	4th Disciple & One Man	June 18, 2007	Blakglobe Records	
Rice & Beanz	Dom Pachino	June 23, 2007	Napalm Recordings	
1st Blood	Dom Pachino	June 23, 2007	Napalm Recordings	
The Offering	Killah Priest	August 21, 2007	Good Hands Records	
Polluted Water	Ice Water Inc.	August 28, 2007	Babygrande Records	
Lost in Translation	Long Axe	September 10, 2007	Chambermusik/Hidden Aspects Music	
The Art of Making Love and War	Solomon Childs	October 4, 2007	Chambermusik	
Razah's Ladder	Blue Sky Black Death & Hell Razah	October 23, 2007	Babygrande Records	
Prince of New York	9th Prince	October 30, 2007	Armyourself Entertainment	
Zu-Chronicles Vol. 5: Back Then	Buddha Monk w/ Popa Wu	October 30, 2007	Armyourself Entertainment	
360	Wisemen	November 7, 2007	Black Day In July	
The Order of Battle	Falling Down	2008	Chambermusik Special Products	
Wishful Thinking	Dungeon Masta	2008	Chambermusik	
Digital Dope Music: Dosage One	Hell Razah	2008	N/A	
Kinetic Radio Vol. 1	Kinetic 9 aka Beretta 9	2008	Royalsunn Enterprises, Illegit Recordz	
Da Garden of Eden	Popa Chief	2008	Chambermusik	
Return of the Darkman	La the Darkman	2008	CMP Entertainment	
The Notorious L.A.D.	La the Darkman & DJ Drama	2008	Gangsta Grillz	
Unreleased Chambers	Buddha Monk	2008	Chambermusik Records	
Enter the Bottom	Shyheim	2008	Bottom Up Records	
Sex, Crime and Audiotape	Dr. Ama	2008	Chambermusik	
Fresh Air Fund	Fes Taylor	2008	Chambermusik	
Legend of Taylor	Fes Taylor	2008	Chambermusik	
Staten Island vs. Tha Industry	Fes Taylor & Two 4 War	2008	Chambermusik	
You Don't Want War	Solomon Childs	2008	Chambermusik	
Volume 1: Aim for the Crown	Shadow Clan Productions	2008	Chambermusik	
Hot Like Sahara Sand	Othorized F.A.M.	2008	Chambermusik	
Caffeind	Fes Taylor	2008	Chambermusik	
Unstoppable	Dainjamentalz	January 8, 2008	Chambermusik Special Products	
The Breaking Point	Fes Taylor	January 8, 2008	Chambermusik Special Products	
The Devil's Pie on God's Plate	Unknown Mizery	January 8, 2008	Chambermusik Special Products	
First Contact	Stone Mecca	February 22, 2008	Touch the Music Records	
Zu-Chronicles Vol. 6: King Monk	Buddha Monk	March 6, 2008	Duck-Lo Records	
Behind the Stained Glass	Killah Priest	May 16, 2008	Good Hands Records, Traffic Entertainment Group	
Hell Hop: Volume Two	Hell Razah	June 2, 2008	Chambermusik	
Visions of the 10th Chamber Pt. II	Popa Wu	June 6, 2008	Future Chamber Entertainment	
Welcome to Red Hook Houses	Hell Razah & Shabazz	July 4, 2008	Babygrande Records	
The Vault (Hidden Safiyahz)	Shabazz the Disciple	July 4, 2008	T.H.U.G. Angelz Music, Chambermusik Records	
The Becoming of the Disciple 94 B.C. – 00 A.B.	Shabazz the Disciple	July 4, 2008	T.H.U.G. Angelz Music, Chambermusik Records	
The Cappatilize Project	Cappadonna	July 22, 2008	Cappadonna Records	
Exit 13	Tommy Whispers & Kryme Life of TMF Presents: Hawk & Kryme	September 11, 2008	Chambermusik Records	
Drastic Measurez	Myalanksy	September 20, 2008	Syndicate Entertainment	
Ultra Sounds of a Renaissance Child	Hell Razah	September 23, 2008	Hell Razah Music Inc.	
Beautiful Minds	Killah Priest & Chief Kamachi	September 23, 2008	Good Hands Records	
Hell Hop: Volume One	Hell Razah	September 26, 2008	Chambermusik	
Power Rulez	Dom Pachino	November 11, 2008	Napalm/Chambermusik Records	
The Legend of Taylor	Fes Taylor	November 16, 2008	Two 4 War Entertainment/Urban Iconz	
Ghetto Poetry	Popa Chief	November 2008	Chambermusik Special Products	
For Every Will There Is a Way	Northstar	December 2008	Northsteezar Records	
History of Poetry	American Poets 2099	2009	Chambermusik	
The Gold Rush	Goldminerz	2009	Gold Bones Music/Chambermusik/New Age Music Group	
The Outfit LP	Phil Anastasia	2009	Chambermusik	
Combat Loaded	Falling Down	2009	Chambermusik Special Products	
Flight 10304 (T-2 Fly)	Inspectah Deck presents Fes Taylor	2009	Chambermusik	
Superb Clientele	Lord Superb	2009	Chambermusik	
For the Luv of Money	Green Back Gorillaz	2009	Chambermusik	
Meet Da Family Volume 1	Dungeon Masta presents Da Dirty Clanzmen	2009	Soh-Lo Records/Chambermusik	
Utopia	Dainjamental	2009	Chambermusik	
Masterpiece	Dainjamental	2009	Chambermusik	
Unbutton Your Holsters Vol. 1	Kevlaar 7	2009	Chambermusik/Black Day in July Productions	
The Eternal Thought of Killah Priest	Killah Priest	2009	N/A	
Disrespectfully Speaking	Shyheim	2009	Bottom Up Records	
Grimlenz	Wu-Syndicate	2009	Digital release	
Slang Originator	Cappadonna & J-Love	2009	N/A	
S.I.N.Y. (Bottom of the Stat)	Shyheim	2009	Bottom Up Records	
Slang Prostitution	Cappadonna	January 27, 2009	Chambermusik	
I Killed the Devil Last Night	Killah Priest	March 7, 2009	Proverbs Records	
Split Personali-d	Dr. Ama	April 17, 2009	Chambermusik	
The Exorcist	Killah Priest	May 15, 2009	Iceman Music Group	
Better Late Than Never	Trife Diesel	July 17, 2009	Diesel Music Group/T.D.L.	
Unbutton Your Holsters Vol. 1	Kevlaar 7	July 20, 2009	Black Day in July Productions	
Welcome to Goonsville	Fes Taylor	September 22, 2009	Chambermusik Special Products	
Castleton Ave.	Solomon Childs	September 22, 2009	Wu Music Group	
Elizabeth	Killah Priest	October 16, 2009	Proverbs Records	
Assassination Order	Watchmen	2010	Chambermusik Special Products	
The 6 Man Wetting	Killarmy	2010	N/A	
It All Comes Down To This	Remedy	2010	APRC Records	
The Stolen Legacy Vol. 1	Black Knights	2010	Black Ball Entertainment	
Sunz of Man Presents 60 Second Assassin – Remarkable Timing	60 Second Assassin	2010	Holy Toledo Productions, Sound Records & Entertainment	
The Young General	Solomon Childs	2010	Chambermusik	
Revenge of The 9th Prince	9th Prince	April 20, 2010	Wu Music Group	
Out of Chef's Kitchen	Hanz On	March 16, 2010	Chambermusik	
American Poets 2099	American Poets 2099	March 23, 2010	Chambermusik/Know the Names Music Group	
The Old Testament (The First Scroll Mixtape)	Rook Da Rukus	June 4, 2010	New Age Music Group/Chambermusik	
The 3 Day Theory	Killah Priest	July 16, 2010	Man Bites Dog Records	
The Anthai Drug	Anthai	August 2, 2010	Self	
I'm Not A Rapper!	Fes Taylor	August 31, 2010	Chambermusik	
Heaven Razah	Hell Razah	September 24, 2010	Nature Sounds	
One Many Army	9th Prince	October 12, 2010	Babygrande Recordings	
Legacy	Dainjamentalz	November 2, 2010	Chambermusik Special Products	
Hood Scripturez	Shabazz the Disciple & DJ Extremidiz	November 4, 2010	Metal Barz Records	
Wu-Tang Meets The Indie Culture (The Lost Files)	Dreddy Kruger	2011	N/A	
Joy and Sorrow	Dainjamental	2011	Chambermusik	
Razah Reborn	Hell Razah	2011	N/A	
Who's Eatin Mixtape Vol. 1	Stumik	2011	Chambermusik	
Operation D.B.H.N.	Sic-Min	2011	Chambermusikq	
”The Best Part”	Njeri Earth	2011	Earth Recording Co	
Asylum Chapters	Dainjamental	2011	Chambermusik	
Killarmy Greatest Hits	Killarmy	2011	Wu Music	
Jus P and the Supafriendz	Jus P	2011	Chambermusik Special Products	
The Strength - The Appetizer	Dom Pachino & Shyheim	2011	Bottom Up Records	
T.I.M. (Throne Is Mine)	Timbo King	2011	Think Differently Music, Nature Sounds	
Embassy Invasion	La the Darkman	January 10, 2011	Street Records Corporation, Embassy Entertainment	
Who Got the Camera?	Kevlaar 7	February 1, 2011	Black Day in July Productions	
Perb Made It Possible	Lord Superb	February 1, 2011	Chambermusik Special Products	
Hood Hymnz	Popa Chief	March 29, 2011	Chambermusik Special Products	
Salute The General EP	9th Prince	April 12, 2011	Granddaddy Flow Ent	
The Tower of Babel	Lost Children of Babylon	June 14, 2011	Chambermusik	
Awaken	Dainjamentalz	August 3, 2011	Chambermusik Special Products	
Loudmoufs	Tommy Whispers, Unspoken	August 25, 2011	Chambermusik Special Products	
From Babylon to Timbuk2	Timbo King	August 30, 2011	Nature Sounds	
School for the Blindman	Bronze Nazareth	September 2011	Babygrande Records	
Deja Wu	D.L.A.H.	October 11, 2011	Chambermusik	
Hood Hopera (Theatrica Biblica)	Shabazz the Disciple	October 18, 2011	Chambermusik Records	
Initials BB	Baritone Brothas	November 11, 2011	Grimey Toof	
The Pilgrimage	Cappadonna	November 15, 2011	Fat Beats/Chambermusik	
Within the Solace	KDB & St. Peter	December 1, 2011	Chambermusik	
Disciples of Hip-Hop	Bizzy Bone & Killah Priest	December 6, 2011	Merlin Media LTD.	
Knowing Project Manzu	Project Manzu	December 13, 2011	Chambermusik	
Dtach & Vs One	Dtach & Vs One	2012	Chambermusik	
Die Ageless	Kevlaar 7	May 29, 2012	Black Day in July Productions	
4 Generations 2 Come	Dainjamentalz	October 9, 2012	Chambermusik Special Products	
Pay Me In Respect	Fes Taylor	August 21, 2012	Chambermusik	
Sophisticated Movement	Kevlaar 7 & Woodenchainz	September 11, 2012	Black Day in July Productions	
Bass Clef Brethren	Baritone Brothas	December 12, 2012	Grimey Toof	
Hell Has A Face Vol. 2	Dungeon Masta presents Morbid Society	December 18, 2012	Chambermusik Special Products	
Flood Ritual	The Flood	2013	Chambermusik Special Products	
Built For War	Loyal -N- Lazlo	2013	Reality Music/Hype-Gnosis Music/Chambermusik Special Products	
Bad Newz	Adlib	2013	Chambermusik	
The Dark Knight	Buddha Monk	2013	Chambermusik	
Sign of the Times (Return to Oceania)	Chris Stylez Tha Shadow Figure	2013	Chambermusik Special Products	
Rick James	Fes Taylor	2013	Chambermusik Special Products	
After the Storm	Fes Taylor	February 5, 2013	Chambermusik Special Products	
Eyrth, Wynd and Fyre	Cappadonna	February 12, 2013	RBC Records	
Children of a Lesser God	Wisemen	February 18, 2013	Black Day In July	
The Psychic World of Walter Reed	Killah Priest	February 25, 2013	Proverbs Records	
Wu-Tang 4 Life 2	Solomon Childs	March 5, 2013	Chambermusik Special Products	
Living After Death	Hell Razah	March 31, 2013	Hell Razah Music Inc.	
Mahdi Music	Realio Sparkzwell	April 13, 2018	Thrice Great Records	
Hannibal the Great	Hanz On	April 20, 2013	Hanz On Music	
Wu-Tang 4 Life	Solomon Childs	April 25, 2013	Chambermusik Special Products	
Christ Bearer & tha Killa Beez	Christ Bearer	August 2, 2013	Nutt Sackular Publishing	
The Producer, Volume 1	G-Clef	August 27, 2013	Chambermusik Special Products	
The 2nd Coming	Canibus, Cappadonna, Planet Asia and Bronze Nazareth as The Almighty	August 27, 2013	RBC	
The Answer	Mathematics	October 1, 2013	All Maf Productions	
Wu-Tang 4 Life 3	Solomon Childs	November 12, 2013	Chambermusik Special Products	
The Chessmen! 2 Knights & A King LP	Black Knights, Shaka Amazulu the 7th	2014	Black Stone of Mecca	
Medieval Chamber	Black Knights	January 14, 2014	Record Collection	
Every Night is Still a Black Knight	Black Knights	March 31, 2014	Wu Music Group	
World of Tomorrow, Vol. 2	American Poets 2099 vs. Mysterious	May 6, 2014	Chambermusik Special Products	
The Producer, Volume 2	G-Clef	May 14, 2014	Chambermusik Special Products	
Hook Off	Cappadonna	June 22, 2014	God Love Family Entertainment	
Beats Behind Bars	Anthai	June 24, 2014	Self-released	
Dark Ages 8/24 A.D.	Judah Priest	August 24, 2014	Proverbs Musik/Hell Razah Musik	
Buzz Killer EP	Fes Taylor	November 11, 2014	Chambermusik Special Products	
Jewels for Wu-Tang	Zippy Kid	November 23, 2014	mARS label	
The Almighty	Black Knights	2015		
In Pro's Laboratory 3	American Poets 2099	February 10, 2015	Chambermusik Special Products	
Jesus Christ Bearer Superstar	Christ Bearer	February 14, 2015	CB BUSINESS	
Planet of the Gods	Killah Priest	June 4, 2015	Proverbs Records	
Ring Of Power	Napoleon	June 9, 2015	RBC	
Monsters in My Room	Solomon Childs	July 28, 2015	Chambermusik Special Products	
Back at Pro's Lab	Warcloud	August 28, 2015	Thirce Great Records	
The Pillage 2	Cappadonna	November 27, 2015	God Love Family Entertainment	
Buddha Monk Presents: Valley Of Kings	Judah Priest	November 29, 2015	Self-released	
The X Tape	Dirty Clanzmen	2016	Chambermusik Special Products	
The Hood Transporter	Hell Razah	2016	Ghetto Government Inc.	
The ChessMen! Knights & Armour LP	Black Knights, Shaka Amazulu the 7th	2016	Black Stone of Mecca	
The Wu Files 1	DJ Flipcyide Presents Hell Razah	2016	N/A	
A Beautiful Soul (Resting in Honor)	Kevlaar 7	2016	Black Day in July Productions	
G.O.D. VIII: Generate, Organize, Destroy	Rubbabandz, Shaka Amazulu the 7th, Solomon Childs	2016	Black Stone of Mecca	
Se7en V: 7 Signs of the Apocalypse	Royal Fam, Shaka Amazulu the 7th	2016	Black Stone of Mecca	
G.O.D. II: Glory or Death	Solomon Childs	2016	Black Stone of Mecca	
Wu-Goo	Ghostface Killah & Killah Priest	2016	N/A	
The Hood Transporter 3	Hell Razah	2016	N/A	
Zambian Music	Wisemen	January 26, 2016	Zambia Music	
Road Kill	Solomon Childs	February 12, 2016	Chambermusik Special Products	
Insanity Genius	Fes Taylor	April 1, 2016	Chambermusik Special Products	
The Hood Transports Vol. 2: Refueled	Hell Razah	April 13, 2016	Ghetto Government Inc.	
”Return of the Supa Sister”	Njeri Earth	May 13, 2016	Earth Recording Co	
Tablet of Destiny: Secrets of the MultiVerse LP	Vega X	August 10, 2016	Chambermusik Special Products	
Krakked Pepper	Joe Mafia	August 16, 2016	Independent	
Darkworld	Judah Priest	August 23, 2016	Self-released	
Sins of the Unforgiven	Dylan James	October 14, 2016	Chambermusik Special Products	
Heru the Face of the Golden Falcon: Rise of the Shemsu Har	Rasul Allah 7	September 9, 2016	Chambermusik Special Products	
Best of Both Hoods	King Just & Pop Da Brown Hornet	October 7, 2016	Thrice Great Records	
The End of the Beginning	B-Nasty	December 10, 2016	Dough Related Productions	
Blaxploitation (A Piece of the Action)	Hell Razah & Ayatollah	2017	N/A	
The Xtra Files	DJ Flipcyide Presents Hell Razah	2017	N/A	
Wu Triad: Organised Crime	DJ Flipcyide Presents Hell Razah	2017	N/A	
Don't Ask Permission, Ask For Forgiveness	Solomon Childs	2017	N/A	
Beginning of the End	Dylan James	January 21, 2017	Chambermusik Special Products	
Crash Course	The Shield Enforcers	February 3, 2017	Thrice Great Records	
Blue Lion Chamber	Falling Down	March 3, 2017	Thrice Great	
The Day After Tomorrow	Judah Priest	March 3, 2017,	Self-released	
Excalibur	Black Knights	March 5, 2017	N/A	
The Hood Transporter 6	Hell Razah	March 9, 2017	Hell Razah Music Inc.	
Barca	Hanz On	March 17, 2017	Hanz On Music	
Trials and Tribulations	Dylan James, Pharaoh	March 31, 2017	Chambermusik Special Products	
Supafriendz 2	Jus P	May 17, 2017	Chambermusik Special Products	
The Lost Children of Babylon presents Rise of the Underground	Dylan James & Rasul Allah 7	June 30, 2017	Chambermusik Special Products	
MMA	Martial Art	August 18, 2017	Chambermusik Special Products	
Zayin: You Only Live Twice	Heaven Razah	September 19, 2017	Hell Razah Music Inc.	
The Spark	Prodigal Sunn	October 31, 2017	Sunn Entertaimoment Group/Royal Sunn ENT	
The Lavish Vs. The Savage	La The Darkman	October 31, 2017	AMG/ APHILLIATES	
Don’t Sit On The Speakers Vol. 1	Killah Priest	November 12, 2017	Proverbs	
G-Clef's Drama Breaks Vol. 2	G-Clef Da Mad Komposa	December 15, 2017	Chambermusik Special Products	
New Wu Generation	Zu Keeper	January 1, 2018	ZuFilms, Black Stone of Mecca	
Firegod: Gift of Fire	Dom Pachino	January 31, 2018	Self-released	
Retrophin (Once Upon A Time...)	Shaka Amazulu the 7th	May 11, 2018	Black Stone of Mecca	
Murderous Poetry pt. 2	American Poets 2099	May 11, 2018	Self	
Eastern Society	Paragone	May 31, 2018	Black Stone of Mecca/Celestial Productions	
For Christ's Sake I (Father, Son, Ghost)	Christ Bearer	June 8, 2018	Black Stone of Mecca	
Project Pope II	Trife Diesel	July 14, 2018	—	
No Fake Made Up Shit	Fes Taylor	31 August 2018		
Target Practice	Shogun Assassin	September 11, 2018	Black Stone of Mecca	
Hip-Hop Isn’t Dead	DJ Flipcyde	September 29, 2018	Independent	
Brotherhood of the Wulf 1	Shaka Amazulu the 7th	October 12, 2018	Black Stone of Mecca	
The Madman's Revenge EP	9th Prince	30 October 2018	Granddaddy Flow Ent. LLC/ Blackstonemecca Productions	
Keep Ya Head Up and Ya Eyes Open	Christ Bearer	November 13, 2018	Black Stone of Mecca	
Mos Famous	Allah Wise	November 17, 2018	Fame Labs Music/Black Stone of Mecca	
780	Trife Diesel & Dj M80	November 23, 2018	Short-Fuze Records	
Heist of the Century II	La The Darkman	November 23, 2018	AMG/ APHILLIATES	
One	Realio Sparkzwell	December 7, 2018	Chambermusik	
Redeemed	Prodigal Sunn	December 11, 2018	Sound Unity Entertainmen/ Sunn Entertainment Group	
The Prophet And The King	Solomon Childs & Tone Spliff	December 14, 2018	Independent	
I Got Next	J-Boo	December 24, 2018	Black Stone of Mecca	
Drastic Measures II	Myalansky	December 25, 2018	Black Stone of Mecca	
Fatal Strikes	Anthai	December 25, 2018	Self	
Bit-Coins	C.O.I.N.S.	January 25, 2019	Black Stone Of Mecca	
Kingpin Wit da Inkpen	Napoleon	March 14, 2019	Black Stone of Mecca	
Strait Razor	Myalansky	April 5, 2019	Independent	
Illustrious	Wu-Syndicate	April 20, 2019	Black Stone Of Mecca	
Spiritual Scarface	Heaven Razah	April 21, 2019	Hell Razah Records	
Wu-Tang Yellow Jackets	Yellow Jackets	April 26, 2019	Black Stone of Mecca	
West Coast Killa Beez	Yellow Jackets	May 3, 2019	Black Stone of Mecca	

== Affiliates of affiliates ==
This is a list of records released under one of the Wu-Tang sub-brands (such as Chambermusik) that may be from an artist who doesn't necessarily represent the Wu-Tang style or sound.

Title	Artist	Release date	Label
My Soul to Keep	Sha Stimuli	2009	Chambermusik
Best Kept Secret	Louieville Sluggah	2010	Chambermusik
Overtime: My Soul to Keep	Sha Stimuli	August 24, 2010	Chambermusik Special Products
Unsung Vol. 1 – The Garden of Eden	Sha Stimuli	January 18, 2011	Chambermusik
The Proposal (The Breakup, Part 2)	Sha Stimuli, DJ Victorious	April 11, 2011	Chambermusik Special Products
The Resurrection of the Golden Wolf	Krumbsnatcha	October 4, 2011	Chambermusik Special Products
Self Induced Illness	Meyhem Lauren	2012	Chambermusik Special Products
Most Interesting Man Alive	J-Love	October 1, 2012	Chambermusik Special Products
Pardon My Intrusion	J-Love	2013	Chambermusik Special Products
Respect the Fly Shit	Meyhem Lauren	April 1, 2014	Chambermusik Special Products
Mandatory Brunch Meetings	Meyhem Lauren	May 15, 2014	Chambermusik Special Products
Moxy 80 Proof	Dj M80	March 2018	Short-Fuze Records
780	Dj M80	Nov 23, 2018	Short-Fuze Records
The Double B	Baritone Brothas	September 11, 2019	Grimey Toof
The Dajamah Variant	Baritone Brothas	May 13, 2022	Grimey Toof
