= Krohme =

American rapper

- Born: Chris Moore; 1980 (age 45–46)
- Genres: Hip Hop, Metal, Doom Metal
- Occupation: Record producer
- Instruments: Drums; Keyboard; Turntable; Sampler; Drum Machine
- Years active: 1997 - Present
- Labels: Godsendant Music; Babygrande Records; Man Bites Dog Records; SpitSLAM Record Label Group; Calm Bomb Collective

Chris Moore, better known as Krohme is an American hip hop and metal producer, noted for his work with Chuck D, Arrested Development, MC Serch, Stetsasonic, Snapcase, Otep, and members of Slipknot, Brand Nubian, Living Colour, 311, Fear Factory, My Life with the Thrill Kill Kult, Earth Crisis, and more.

== Biography ==
Krohme (often incorrectly listed as "Khrome") is an Autistic American music producer and multi-genre artist from Alexandria, Virginia. Born in 1980 to a Black father and a mother of Spanish and German descent, he was introduced to a wide range of music through his parents' eclectic tastes. His early exposure to music was further nurtured by playing instruments during his elementary school years in Hawaii and later in Virginia.

== Career ==
=== Early work and breakthrough (1997–2005) ===
By 1997, Krohme began sampling records to create hip-hop beats, blending influences from hip-hop, soul, rock, heavy metal, and classical music. Initially, he provided beats to unsigned artists in the Washington-D.C. area before establishing connections with major artists.

Krohme’s first major industry connection came in 2005 when he collaborated with rapper Ras Kass, on the single "The Long Walk Home." That same year, he founded Godsendant Music (2005- 2011) (Later Godsendant Collective from 2020 - 2022) as an independent label and released his debut project, All Praises Due, featuring guest appearances from Royce da 5'9", MC Serch, Agallah, Hell-Razah, Chace Infinite, and Triple Seis.

=== Expansion and collaborations (2006–2011) ===
He gained further recognition by producing three songs on MF Grimm’s 2006 album American Hunger, released through Day by Day Entertainment. MF Grimm also briefly managed Krohme during this period.

In 2006, Krohme produced "Hush Little Baby," a high-profile diss track by Ras Kass directed at The Game. Despite the controversy, he later worked with The Game on a remix of Dezert Eez’s track "Gunz Out."

His collaborations expanded in 2007 when Hell Razah (of Black Market Militia/Sunz of Man) enlisted Krohme to produce for his solo album Renaissance Child (Nature Sounds), including the tracks Nativity (featuring Killah Priest) and Lost Ark. Krohme also worked on unreleased remixes for Los Pepes, Pt. 1 and Project Jazz, originally produced by MF Doom.

On Valentine’s Day 2008, Krohme signed with Babygrande Records to release The Beasts Released Volume 1: South of Heaven, a project featuring Kool G Rap, Sean Price, Chino XL, Agallah, C-Rayz Walz, Hell Razah, Psycho Les, Atari Blitzkrieg, Lord Jamar, Rapper Pooh, Cappadonna, Killah Priest and others. However, the album was leaked before its official release and shelved.

In 2009, he began working on a joint album with Hell Razah, tentatively titled Krohme Razahs, though it remains unreleased.

=== Hiatus and return (2011–2022) ===
Krohme is also recognized for his production and remix work across multiple genres, collaborating with artists from Slipknot, Fear Factory, Living Colour, Earth Crisis, My Life with the Thrill Kill Kult and Damnation A.D. He was affiliated with Wu-Tang Clan-related groups Lost Children of Babylon and Thug Angelz.

Godsendant Music ceased operations in 2011, and Krohme largely stepped away from public releases, focusing on occasional production work behind the scenes.

In 2020, during the COVID-19 pandemic, Krohme returned to music, releasing Breez Evahflowin - Old Man Spring: Krohme (2020) with Breez Evahflowin. This marked his first official release in nearly a decade.

=== Calm Bomb Collective (2023–Present) ===
In 2023, Krohme founded Calm Bomb Collective, providing a platform for Disabled & Autistic musicians to release music and receive support while benefitting nonprofit organizations.

== Partial Discography ==
=== Studio albums ===
- Krohme - The Ceremony of Innocence (2022)
- Krohme - Before the Animals Know You're Dead (2025)
- Krohme - A Beautiful Struggle (2025)

=== EPs ===
- Kahlee x Krohme - Blind to the Facts (2021)
- Empuls x Krohme - By Love or By Force (2022)
- Krohme - Cursed Earth (2022)
- Indigo Phoenyx x Krohme - The Dynasty of Dominique Devereaux (2022)
- Empuls x Krohme - By Love or By Force (2022)
- I9on x Krohme - Liqwit Krohme (2022)
- Paavo x Krohme - Evidence of a Struggle (2022)

=== Collaborative Albums ===
- Breez Evahflowin - Old Man Spring: Krohme (2020)
- Shogun Assason - Target Practice 3: Krohme Remixes (2020)
- Godforbid of That Handsome Devil x Krohme - Tales of the Haunted Microphone (2021)
- Godforbid of That Handsome Devil x Krohme - Tales of the Haunted Microphone 2 (2023)

=== Partial list of productions ===
- Arrested Development - "Stop [Krohme's Reprise]" feat. Speech & 1 Love
- Canibus - "Gold & Bronze Magik" feat. Bronze Nazareth & Copywrite
- Hell Razah – "Lost Ark"
- Hell Razah – "Nativity"
- Ill Bill ft. Killah Priest - "Awaiting the Hour"
- King Dude & Krohme - 16 Tons feat. Doug Wimbish & Daniel Fleming of Age of Ruin
- Krohme - Circle of Lies (Reprise)" feat. The Impossebulls, Chuck D of Public Enemy & Cesar Soto of Ministry_(band)
- Krohme - "Goon Opera (Come See Me)" feat. Kool G Rap, Chino XL, Sean Price & Hell Razah
- Krohme - "Legacy" feat. Daddy-O of Stetsasonic, Kool Kim of The U.M.C.'s, Chill Rob G, and Aaron Wills of 311_(band)
- Krohme – "Line of Fire" feat. Brother Ali, Chuck D of Public Enemy, Speech of Arrested Development, and Doug Wimbish of Living Colour
- Krohme – "Live Free" feat. Craig G, Chuck D of Public Enemy, Karl Buechner of Earth Crisis, and Scott Crouse of Earth Crisis
- Krohme – "Ride or Die feat. Challace & Metta World Peace"
- Krohme - "Think Twice" feat. Rapper Pooh, Motion Man & Breez Evahflowin
- Krohme – "The Judgment" feat. Lord Jamar, Sadat-X and Doug Wimbish
- MC Serch – "Round Here" feat. Bobby J from Rockaway and Krohme
- MF Grimm – "Karma" feat. Block McCloud and Ill Bill
- MF Grimm – "Page Six"
- MF Grimm – "When Faith is Lost"
- Obie Trice – "Hope"
- Otep - "Exit Wounds"
- Otep - "The God Slayer"
- Ras Kass – "Hush Little Baby (The Game Diss)"
- Ras Kass – "The Long Walk Home" featuring Jay 211
- Sid Wilson - " †hΣ £ø√Σ ¡N∫¡DΣ"
- Snapcase - "New Kata (Krohme's Reprise)"
- Stetsasonic - "Fallen Soldiers"
- Strong Arm Steady – "Set Me Free"
- Wes Nihil – "Forever Darkness" featuring Danny Diablo and Mike McTernan of Damnation A.D.
