= Heaven Razah =

Studio album by Hell Razah
- Released: September 28, 2010
- Recorded: 2009–2010
- Genre: Hip hop
- Length: 57:05
- Label: Nature Sounds
- Producer: Kevlaar 7 Rainmayqah; Dev 1 Jordan River Banks; Ayatollah; Shroom; St. Peter; Blastah Beatz; Havoc; 4th Disciple; Bronze Nazareth; Allah Mathematics

Hell Razah chronology
Ultra Sounds of a Renaissance Child (album) (2008)	Heaven Razah (2010)

Professional ratings
Review scores
Source	Rating
KevinNottingham.com	link
Okayplayer	(84/10) link
RapReviews	link

Heaven Razah is a solo album by rapper Hell Razah, released on September 28, 2010 through Nature Sounds Records. Razah is most famed as a member of Wu-Tang Clan affiliate groups Sunz of Man and Black Market Militia. The album features production from Dev 1, Rainmayqah, Jordan River Banks, Kevlaar 7, Ayatollah, Shroom, St. Peter, Blastah Beatz, Havoc and Wu-Tang affiliate producers Bronze Nazareth, Allah Mathematics and 4th Disciple. Album guests include Timbo King, R.A. the Rugged Man, Shabazz the Disciple and Darnell McClain.

According to RapReviews, the album "is undoubtedly one of Razah's most well produced and complex albums, layered up with hard hitting beats and pop culture dialogue snippets."

== Track listing ==
#	Title	Producer(s)	Performer (s)	Length
1	"The Arrival (Intro)"	Dev 1	Hell Razah	3:08
2	"Negro Angelitos"	Dev 1	Hell Razah	3:12
3	"Book of Heaven Razah"	Rainmayqah	Hell Razah	3:36
4	"Medical Kush"	Bronze Nazareth & Kevlaar 7	Hell Razah	3:47
5	"Raised In Hell"	Mathematics	Hell Razah	3:45
6	"Fear of God"	Godz Wrath	Hell Razah	2:54
7	"Cinematic"	4th Disciple	Hell Razah	3:11
8	"Return of the Renaissance"	Dev 1	Hell Razah, R.A. the Rugged Man	2:52
9	"Kids in the Street"	Ayatollah	Hell Razah	3:13
10	"A Brooklyn Tale"	Shroom	Hell Razah, Shabazz the Disciple	4:00
11	"Selah"	St. Peter	Hell Razah	2:35
12	"Dear Lord"	Dev 1	Hell Razah	3:11
13	"My Testimony"	Blastah Beatz	Hell Razah, Darnell McClain	3:40
14	"Heaven On Earth	Blastah Beatz	Hell Razah, Timbo King, Darnell McClain	4:49
15	"Armageddon (Heaven & Hell)"/"Araboth (Hidden Track)"	Havoc/Dev 1	Hell Razah	9:05
16	"Blessed Be The Meek (Bonus Track)"	Dev 1	Hell Razah	2:07

== Album singles ==
Single information
"Kids in the Street"
- Released: June 14, 2010
