= The Spirit of Apollo =

Studio album by N.A.S.A.
- Released: February 17, 2009
- Recorded: 2004–2009
- Genres: Baile funk; hip-hop; electronica; rock
- Length: 76:01
- Label: Anti-
- Producer: N.A.S.A.

Singles from The Spirit of Apollo
- 1. "Hip Hop" Released: January 28, 2009; 2. "The People Tree" Released: February 23, 2009; 3. "Way Down" Released: March 11, 2009; 4. "Gifted" Released: March 27, 2009; 5. "Spacious Thoughts" Released: November 19, 2009; 6. "Strange Enough" Released: July 15, 2010

The Spirit of Apollo is the only studio album by hip hop duo N.A.S.A., consisting of Squeak E. Clean and DJ Zegon. It was released on February 17, 2009, through Anti-.

The track "N.A.S.A. Anthem" was featured on the official NASA Glenn Research Center website as "NASA Anthem". The album features guest appearances from Kanye West, David Byrne, Tom Waits, RZA, Kool Keith, Chuck D, John Frusciante, Method Man, M.I.A, Santigold, Seu Jorge, George Clinton, Spank Rock, Chali 2na, Gift of Gab, KRS-One, Lykke Li, Ghostface Killah, Karen O, and Ol' Dirty Bastard, amongst others.

== Reception ==
Professional ratings
Aggregate scores
Source	Rating
Metacritic	64/100
Review scores
Source	Rating
AllMusic	3/5 stars
Alternative Press	4.5/5 stars
The A.V. Club	B+
Consequence of Sound	C−
The Guardian	3/5 stars
Los Angeles Times	2.5/5 stars
The Phoenix	3/4 stars
Pitchfork	1.6/10
PopMatters	6/10 stars
The Skinny	2/5 stars

At Metacritic, which assigns a normalized rating out of 100 to reviews from critics, The Spirit of Apollo received an average score of 64 based on 24 reviews, indicating "generally favorable reviews".

Zeth Lundy of The Phoenix said: "The beats are eminently funky, the rhymes tight, and the topics decidedly old-school: plain-spoken boasts, the rejection of greed, and an acknowledgment of our communal evolution indicate the overall tone." Meanwhile, John Bush of AllMusic said: "Few of the guests stand out, none of them seem to be speaking to each other, and the result is, ironically, a Babel of voices and sounds that doesn't communicate much of anything."

== Track listing ==
No.	Title	Length
1.	"Intro"	0:59
2.	"The People Tree" (featuring David Byrne, Chali 2na, Gift of Gab, and Z-Trip)	4:14
3.	"Money" (featuring David Byrne, Chuck D, Ras Congo, Seu Jorge, and Z-Trip)	4:16
4.	"N.A.S.A. Music" (featuring Method Man, E-40, and DJ Swamp)	4:22
5.	"Way Down" (featuring RZA, Barbie Hatch, and John Frusciante)	3:13
6.	"Hip Hop" (featuring KRS-One, Fatlip, and Slim Kid Tre)	4:07
7.	"Four Rooms, Earth View"	0:25
8.	"Strange Enough" (featuring Karen O, Ol' Dirty Bastard, and Fatlip)	4:13
9.	"Spacious Thoughts" (featuring Tom Waits and Kool Keith)	4:30
10.	"Gifted" (featuring Kanye West, Santigold, and Lykke Li)	3:39
11.	"A Volta" (featuring Sizzla, Amanda Blank, and Lovefoxxx)	3:13
12.	"There's a Party" (featuring George Clinton, and Chali 2na)	4:07
13.	"Whachadoin?" (featuring Spank Rock, M.I.A., Santigold, and Nick Zinner)	4:09
14.	"O Pato" (featuring Kool Kojak and DJ Babão)	3:18
15.	"Samba Soul" (featuring Del tha Funkee Homosapien and DJ Qbert)	4:24
16.	"The Mayor" (featuring The Cool Kids, Ghostface Killah, Scarface, and DJ AM)	4:35
17.	"N.A.S.A. Anthem"	15:32
18.	"Electric Flowers" (featuring Nina Persson and RZA)

== Charts ==
Chart	Peak position
Billboard 200	178
Heatseekers Albums	6
Independent Albums	23
