= Sunz of Man =

American hip hop group

- Origin: Brooklyn, New York City, U.S.
- Genres: Hip hop
- Years active: 1994–present
- Members: Prodigal Sunn; Killah Priest; Hell Razah; 60 Second Assassin
- Past members: Shabazz the Disciple; 7th Ambassador; Su-Preme
- Website: www.sunzofman.com

Sunz of Man is a New York–based Wu-Tang Clan-affiliated group that currently consists of Prodigal Sunn, Killah Priest, Hell Razah, and 60 Second Assassin. The group's first incarnation also included Shabazz the Disciple, 7th Ambassador, and producer Su-Preme.

== History ==
=== 1994–1996 ===
Prior to being affiliated with Wu-Tang, Sunz were initially known as Da Last Future and included Shabazz the Disciple, 7th Ambassador, and producer Su-Preme, but not 60 Second Assassin. Upon its induction into the Wu-Tang family, the group became the first group signed to Wu-Tang Records. In 1995 and 1996, the group released a number of singles, including "No Love Without Hate", "Soldiers of Darkness" (a collaboration with Killarmy), "Five Arch Angels”, and "Bloody Choices". These tracks were to be included on the group's planned debut album Nothing New Under the Sun, originally scheduled for release in 1996. Due to label complications, the album was eventually shelved.

=== 1997–2001 ===
In 1997, the group signed a deal with Red Ant Entertainment. Its first release on the label was the "We Can't Be Touched" b/w "Natural High" single, released that same year. They also made an appearance on Mood's debut album Doom on the song "Illuminated Sunlight". "Natural High" was included on the group's 1998 debut album The Last Shall be First. The album featured production from Su-Preme, as well as Wu producers RZA, 4th Disciple, and True Master, and Wyclef Jean. Album guests included Wu-Tang members Masta Killa, Method Man, Raekwon, Ol' Dirty Bastard, and U-God, as well as Killarmy's Beretta 9, Dreddy Kruger and Tekitha. The album debuted at No. 20 on the Billboard 200 album chart, and No. 7 on the R&B/Hip-Hop chart. The album received moderate acclaim from critics.

Before the release of the debut, Killah Priest began to clash with Wu leader RZA, as Shabazz had earlier, both eventually cutting their Wu ties, and leaving the group for solo careers. In 1999, the album The First Testament was released, compiled of the group's earlier work, with contributions from Shabazz and 7th Ambassador. A number of tracks from the album were released as singles, including "Deep in the Water", "In the Beginning...", and "The Sins of Men". However, due to heavy bootlegging, the album never saw a proper release. The group took a hiatus, while Killah Priest established his solo career.

=== 2002–2006 ===
Hell Razah, Prodigal Sunn and 60 Second Assassin, returned in 2002 with the group's second official studio album Saviorz Day. The album was met with a mediocre reception commercially and critically. In 2004, The First Testament saw a re-release as Elements, which featured most of the tracks from The First Testament, as well as a handful of other previously unreleased tracks. Later in 2004, Hell Razah and 4th Disciple (under the prefix "Sunz of Man presents") released the album Freedom of Speech, which spawned the single "Article One" b/w "Project Love". In 2003, Shabazz announced a return to the group, but a new group album has yet to be recorded, and no further efforts were made. The group's most recent release was a 2006 compilation titled The Old Testament, which features the group's early singles as well as some of their later hits.

=== Solo careers ===
Killah Priest was the first SoM member to embark on a solo career, releasing his acclaimed debut album Heavy Mental a few months prior to The Last Shall Be First. He released more studio albums, 2000's View From Masada, 2001's Priesthood, 2003's Black August and 2007's The Offering. Hell Razah released his solo debut When All Hell Breaks Loose in 2001 and received little attention. Shabazz the Disciple released his long-delayed debut album The Book of Shabazz (Hidden Scrollz) in 2003, which included a number of his early singles, such as "Crime Saga", "The Lamb's Blood" and "Street Parables". Prodigal Sunn released his solo debut The Return of the Prodigal Sunn in 2005. Also in 2005, Killah Priest and Hell Razah, along with Royal Fam's Timbo King and New York veteran Tragedy Khadafi formed the Black Market Militia, and released their self-titled album. Hell Razah released two albums in 2007, first Renaissance Child in February, and second Razah's Ladder, a collaboration with producers Blue Sky Black Death, released in October. Razah and Shabazz teamed up with producer Ayatollah in 2008 to form T.H.U.G. Angelz, and release their debut Welcome to Red Hook Houses.

In early 2019, Hell Razah was featured in the song "The Grandmaster" on Cryptik Soul's album Killer's Blood.

=== 2019–present ===
In 2019, Sunz of Man returned and released its third official studio album "The Rebirth", which featured Cappadonna, Planet Asia, La The Darkman, 12 O'Clock, Makeba Mooncycle, Chi King, Shaka Amazulu VII, and Tristate.

== Discography ==
Sunz of Man (Group)
Album title	Album Info
Nothing New Under The Sun	Released: Unreleased, planned for 1996; Label: Wu-Tang/Priority Records/EMI; Singles: "Soldiers of Darkness"/"Five Arch Angels", "No Love Without Hate", "Bloody Choices"
The Last Shall Be First	Released: July 21, 1998; Label: Red Ant Entertainment/V2/BMG; Singles: "Natural High", "Shining Star"/"Cold", "The Plan"/"Collaboration '98"
The First Testament (Bootleg)	Released: January 31, 1999; Label: Red Hook Records; Singles: "Deep in the Water"/"In the Beginning..."/"The Sins of Man", "Who are the Sunz of Man?"/"The Valley of Death"/"Bring Back the Mike"/"Valley of Kings"
Saviorz Day	Released: September 3, 2002; Label: D3 Entertainment; Singles: "Savior's Day"
Elements (The First Testament re-release)	Released: July 13, 2004; Label: X-Ray/Cleopatra Records; Singles: "Deep in the Water"/"In the Beginning..."/"The Sins of Man", "Who are the Sunz of Man?"/"Bring Back the Mike"
The Old Testament (Compilation)	Released: April 4, 2006; Label: Green Streets Entertainment/Nature Sounds
The Rebirth	Released: August 2, 2019; Label: X-Ray/Cleopatra Records

Sunz of Man Singles
Track title(s)	Producer	Release date
Soldier of Darkness (with Killarmy) b/w Five ArchAngels	4th Disciple	1995 Wu-Tang Records
No Love Without Hate	Su-Preme	1995
Bloody Choices	4th Disciple	1996
We Can't Be Touched b/w Natural High	Ray Roll & Tony Touch b/w RZA	1997 Threat/Red Ant/Wu-Tang Records
Shining Star b/w Cold	Wyclef Jean b/w 4th Disciple	1998 Threat/Red Ant/Wu-Tang Records
Shining Star (remix) b/w Intellectuals (featuring Raekwon and U-God)	Wyclef Jean b/w True Master	1998 Threat/Red Ant/Wu-Tang Records
The Plan b/w Collaboration '98 (featuring Method Man)	4th Disciple/True Master	1998 Threat/Red Ant/Wu-Tang Records
Deep in the Water/Writing Rhymes With a Liquid Pen b/w In the Beginning .../The Sins of Man		1998
Who are the Sunz of Man?/The Valley of Death b/w Bring Back the Mike/Valley of Kings		1998
Rosewood b/w Hell's Inmates		1999
Savior's Day		2002

== Videography ==
Sunz of Man Videography
Artist(s)	Album Info	Video Title(s)	Release date
Sunz of Man	12" Single	Soldiers of Darkness (featuring Killarmy, various Wu-Tang Clan cameos)	1995 Wu-Tang Records
Killarmy	Silent Weapons for Quiet Wars	Wake Up (featuring Prodigal Sunn and various Wu-Tang Clan cameos)	1997 Wu-Tang/Priority/ENIRecords
Sunz of Man	The Last Shall be First	The Plan	1998 Threat/Red Ant/Wu-Tang Records
Hell Razah	The Razah Code: Underground Hip-Hop Vol. 1	Hell Razah DVD	2004 Threat/Red Ant/Wu-Tang Records
Hell Razah	Renaissance Child	Renaissance (featuring Tragedy Khadafi, Timbo King, R.A. the Rugged Man)	2007 Nature Sounds
Hell Razah & Blue Sky Black Death	Razah's Ladder	Razah's Ladder	2007 Babygrande
Hell Razah & 4th Disciple	Freedom of Speech	High Science	2009 X-Ray/Cleopatra Records

== See also ==
- List of Wu-Tang Clan affiliates
