= Renaissance Child =

Studio album by Hell Razah
- Released: February 20, 2007
- Recorded: 2006
- Studio: Chung King Studios (New York, NY)
- Genre: Hip-hop
- Length: 57:07
- Label: Nature Sounds
- Producer: 4th Disciple; Bronze Nazareth; Dev 1; Dirty Needlez; DJ Battle; Fabrizio Sotti; Fokis; Jordan River Banks; Krohme; MF Doom; Shuko; Smokeshop Productions

Hell Razah chronology
Black Market Militia (2005)	Renaissance Child (2007)	Razah's Ladder (2007)

Singles from Renaissance Child
- 1. "Buried Alive" Released: March 6, 2007

Professional ratings
Review scores
Source	Rating
HipHopDX	3.5/5
laut.de	3/5 stars
RapReviews	7.5/10

Renaissance Child is the second solo studio album by American rapper Hell Razah. It was released on February 20, 2007, through Nature Sounds. Recording sessions took place at Chung King Studios in New York. Production was handled by Bronze Nazareth, Dirty Needlez, Krohme, 4th Disciple, Dev 1, DJ Battle, Fabrizio Sotti, Fokis, Jordan River Banks, MF Doom, Shuko and Smokeshop Productions, with Amal McCaskill and Hell Razah serving as executive producers. It features guest appearances from The Maccabeez, Bronze Nazareth, Ras Kass, R.A. the Rugged Man, Talib Kweli, Tragedy Khadafi and Viktor Vaughn.

The track "Renaissance" was originally released on the Nature Sounds compilation album Natural Selection. The album's lead single "Buried Alive" b/w "Project Jazz" was dropped on March 6, 2007. The album has moved 4,506 units.

== Track listing ==
No.	Title	Writer(s)	Producer(s)	Length
1.	"Nativity"	Chron Smith; Chris Moore	Krohme	1:57
2.	"Buried Alive"	Smith; Michiel Klaasen	Dirty Needlez	5:02
3.	"Renaissance" (featuring Tragedy Khadafi, Timbo King and R.A. the Rugged Man)	Smith; Percy Chapman; Timothy Drayton; R.A. Thorburn; Devin Horwitz	Dev 1	3:27
4.	"Project Jazz" (featuring Talib Kweli and Viktor Vaughn)	Smith; Talib Kweli Greene; Daniel Dumile	MF Doom	3:45
5.	"Los Pepes, Pt. 1" (featuring Bronze Nazareth)	Smith; Justin Cross	Bronze Nazareth	3:33
6.	"Dear Sista"			0:40
7.	"Yours Truly"	Smith	Fabrizio Sotti	3:35
8.	"Glow"	Smith	4th Disciple	3:23
9.	"Chain Gang"	Smith; Frédéric Marionnaud	DJ Battle	3:37
10.	"Runaway Sambo"	Smith; Joseph Bishun	Smokeshop Productions	4:04
11.	"Smoking Gunnz" (featuring Killah Priest)	Smith; Walter Reed; Klaasen	Dirty Needlez	5:19
12.	"Millenium Warfare"	Smith; Cross	Bronze Nazareth	4:09
13.	"Musical Murdah" (featuring Ras Kass)	Smith; Jonas Leopold	Jordan River Bank	3:55
14.	"Maccabee House" (featuring the Maccabeez)	Smith; Drayton; Reed; William Heredia	Fokis	4:01
15.	"Lost Ark"	Smith; Moore	Krohme	3:14
16.	"Thankful"	Smith	Shuko	3:26
Total length:				57:07

The Razah Code DVD bonus
No.	Title	Director(s)	Length
17.	"Intro"		3:01
18.	"Hood Love" (prod. by 4th Disciple)	Khalik-Allah	3:23
19.	"Live at BB King" (featuring Black Market Mafia)		1:51
20.	"Interview"		1:30
21.	"Live at BB King / Way of Life"	Apademik	2:43
22.	"Interview"		4:23
23.	"Outro"		3:25
