= N.A.S.A. (musical group) =

American hip hop group

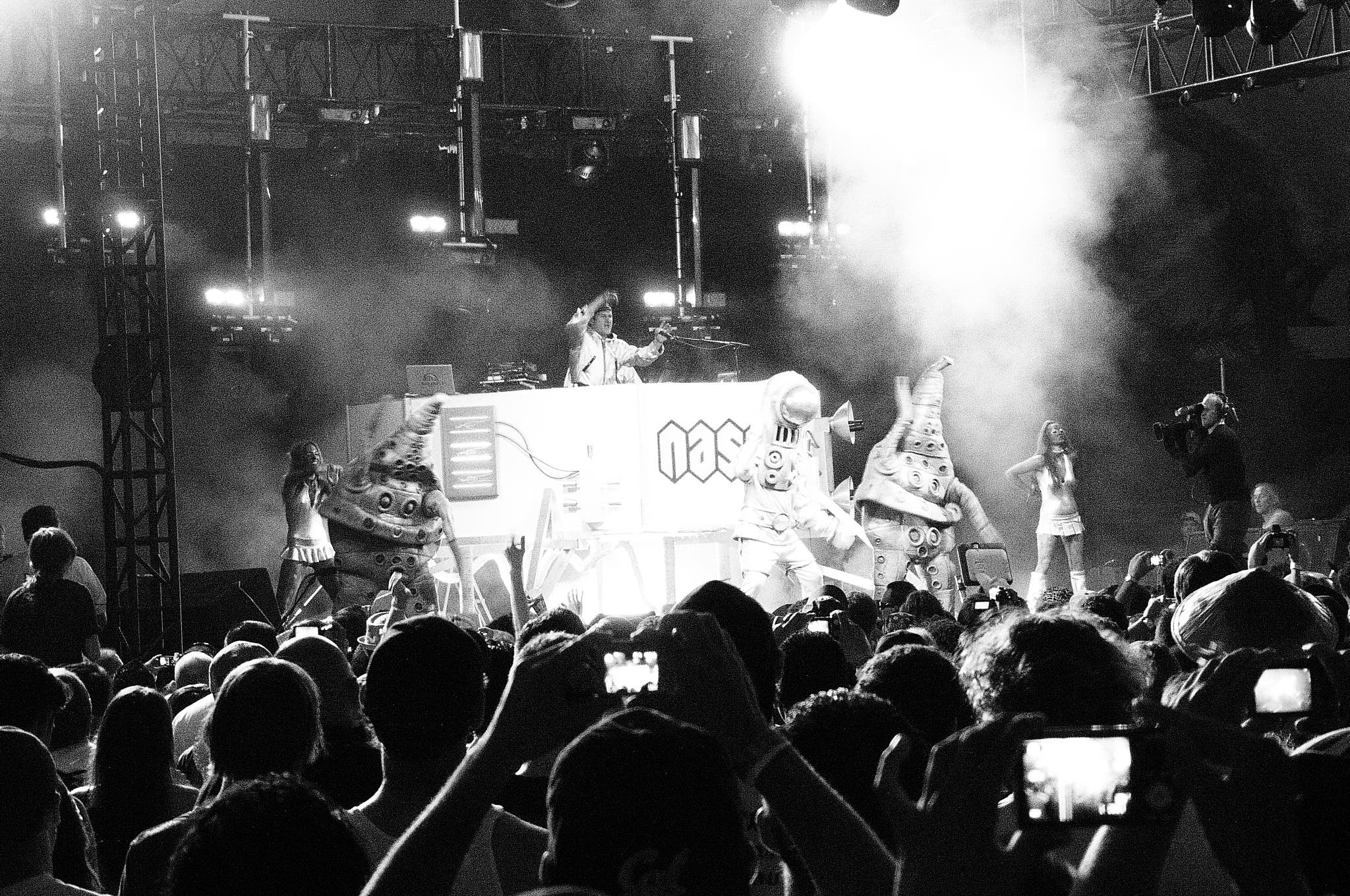
- N.A.S.A. performing at Coachella in 2009

Background information
- Origin: Los Angeles, California
- Genres: Alternative hip-hop; indie hip-hop; underground hip-hop; experimental hip-hop; electronica; funk; indie rock
- Years active: 2003–2020
- Labels: ANTI-; Epitaph; Spectrophonic Sound
- Members: Sam Spiegel; Zé Gonzales

N.A.S.A. (North America/South America) is an American hip hop music group that formed in 2003, consisting of members Sam Spiegel and Zé Gonzales. Members of N.A.S.A. have collaborated with artists from both the East and West Coasts of the U.S., alongside international artists. The group has been inactive since 2020, following the release of The Spirit of Apollo (10th Anniversary Special Edition). They are based in Los Angeles, California.

== Early history ==
Sam and Zé met at a friend's studio in April 2003 and began making music together shortly after.

Initially, the two began producing music together purely for fun, using samples of rare Brazilian records from the 1960s and 1970s (discovered through a shared love of record collecting) but this quickly developed into recording music with many other musicians.

Sam and Zé wanted their musical project to unite people through a shared love of music. N.A.S.A. was formed soon after. They have since collaborated with artists such as Ol' Dirty Bastard, Karen O, Fatlip, George Clinton, Chali 2na, Tom Waits, Kool Keith, Kanye West, David Byrne, Childish Gambino, Lizzo, and DMX.

== Discography ==
Albums

- 2009: The Spirit of Apollo
- 2010: The Big Bang (An album of remixes of The Spirit of Apollo)

Singles

- 2009: "Gifted (feat. Kanye West, Santigold and Lykke Li)"
- 2009: "Money (feat. Chuck D, Z-Trip, David Byrne, Ras Congo and Seu Jorge)"
- 2009: "Whachadoin? (feat. M.I.A., Spank Rock, Santigold & Nick Zinner)"
- 2010: "Chase The Devil"
- 2012: "Samo © (feat. Kool Kojak and Fab Five Freddy)"
- 2012: "Overdrive (feat. Maximum Hedrum)"
- 2013: "Hide (feat. Aynzil Jones)"
- 2013: "Hide (feat. Aynzil Jones) (Tropkillaz Remix)"
- 2013: "Hide (feat. Aynzil Jones and Childish Gambino) (Tropkillaz Remix)"
- 2013: "Hide (feat. Aynzil Jones) (A Skillz Remix)"
- 2014: "I Shot the Sheriff (feat. Karen O)"
- 2014: "I Shot the Sheriff (feat. Karen O) (Tropkillaz Remix)"
- 2015: "Hands Up, Don't Shoot! (feat. Sean Paul and Lizzo)"
- 2015: "Iko (feat. Lizzo)"
- 2015: "Iko (feat. Lizzo) (Tropkillaz Remix)"
- 2015: "Jihad Love Squad (feat. KRS-One)"
- 2015: "Meltdown (feat. DMX and Priyanka Chopra)"
- 2015: "Wake The Fuck Up (feat. Fatlip and Maximum Hedrum)"
- 2015: "R.I.P. That Beat (feat. Cory Enemy and Fatlip)"
- 2015: "Hey Hey Hey (feat. Spoek Mathambo and Donnis)"
- 2016: "We Takin' Over (feat. Fatlip and Kate Boy)"
- 2016: "Jihad Love Squad (feat. KRS-One) (Tropkillaz Remix)"
- 2016: "Jihad Love Squad (feat. KRS-One) (Wuki Remix)"

Remixes

- 2009: Yeah Yeah Yeahs - Zero (N.A.S.A. Bloody Lobo)
- 2013: Yeah Yeah Yeahs - Mosquito (N.A.S.A. Sucks Theramin Remix)
- 2014: Stan Getz - The Girl From Ipanema (N.A.S.A. Remix)
- 2015: Missy Elliott - Get Ur Freak On (N.A.S.A. Bootleg Remix)

Mixtapes

- 2020: Space Debris
