= The Old Testament (album) =

Greatest hits album by Sunz of Man
- Released: April 4, 2006
- Genre: Hip-hop, Conscious hip hop
- Length: 69:52
- Label: Green Streets Entertainment/Nature Sounds
- Producer: Dropsect, Joe Loops, 4th Disciple, Supreme, RZA, True Master, Platinum Brothers, Fatal Son, Wyclef Jean

Sunz of Man chronology
Saviorz Day (2003)	The Old Testament (2006)

The Old Testament is a greatest-hits album of hip-hop group Sunz of Man, released in 2006.

Pierre Hamilton of Exclaim! reviewed the album, noting "While lacking in originality, this effort finds success by including 'Intellectuals', which is instantly classic in the way Wu-Tang's 'Triumph' was, but obviously less so."

== Track listing ==
1. "Genesis"
2. "All We Got" (edit)
3. "Rivers of Eden"
4. "Five Arch Angels"
5. "Soldiers Of Darkness" (featuring 9th Prince, Killa Sin)
6. "No Love Without Hate"
7. "Combination of Death"
8. "Jessica Skit"
9. "Valley of Kings"
10. "Tha Law"
11. "Sin of Man"
12. "Inmates to the Fire"
13. "Next Up" (featuring Method Man) [Hidden track]
14. "Intellectuals" (featuring Raekwon, U-God)
15. "People Change" (featuring MC Eiht)
16. "Savior'z Day" (featuring Ghostface Killah)
17. "Shining Star" (featuring Ol' Dirty Bastard)
