= Return of the Prodigal Sunn =

Studio album by Prodigal Sunn
- Released: June 21, 2005
- Genre: Hip-hop
- Length: 58:43
- Label: Free Agency Recordings
- Producer: Bennie "B Original" Williams; DJ Battle; Filf Rich Obscene Machine Corp.; J. Wells; K Beats Kolossal; Keno; Leggezin; Michael Baiardi; Prodigal Sunn; RZA

Professional ratings
Review scores
Source	Rating
AllHipHop	2.5/5 stars
RapReviews	6.5/10

Return of the Prodigal Sunn is the debut solo studio album by American rapper Prodigal Sunn. It was released on June 21, 2005, via Free Agency Recordings. The production was handled by Bennie "B Original" Williams, K Beats Kolossal, RZA, DJ Battle, Filf Rich Obscene Machine Corp., J. Wells, Keno, Leggezin, Michael Baiardi, and Prodigal Sunn himself, who also served as executive producer. It features guest appearances from Madame D, 12 O'Clock, Scotty, Yung Masta, 60 Second Assassin, Aleksei, A&R, C.C.F. Division, Chi-King and J. Wells.

== Track listing ==
No.	Title	Producer(s)	Length
1.	"In My Life" (featuring 12 O'Clock, Chi-King and Madame D)	Bennie "B Original" Williams	4:29
2.	"Soul Survivor"	DJ Battle; Keno	4:02
3.	"Movin' on Up" (featuring Madame D)	Bennie "B Original" Williams	4:06
4.	"Brutality (The Grindz Remix)" (featuring C.C.F. Division)	RZA	3:47
5.	"Procrastinators" (featuring Free Murder, Yung Masta and Bonzi J.Wellz)	J. Wells	3:20
6.	"The Traitor (Betrayal Intro)"	Bennie "B Original" Williams; Mike Baiardi	0:25
7.	"Betrayal"	Bennie "B Original" Williams; C Natural (co.)	4:22
8.	"Campaignin'" (featuring Yung Masta)	Leggezin Fin	3:39
9.	"Manhunt" (featuring 12 O'Clock)	Bennie "B Original" Williams	4:20
10.	"Lovely Ladies" (featuring Scotty)	RZA	3:42
11.	"Godz People" (featuring A&R and 60 Second Assassin)	Filf Rich Obscene Machine Corp.	4:20
12.	"Puzzled"	Bennie "B Original" Williams	4:27
13.	"Reach Out" (featuring Madame D)	Bennie "B Original" Williams	4:37
14.	"Love Is Love" (featuring Aleksei)	K Beats Kolossal; Prodigal Sunn	4:24
15.	"Sunshine" (featuring Madame D and Scotty)	K Beats Kolossal	4:43
Total length:			58:43

== Personnel ==
- Virgil Lamar "Prodigal Sunn" Ruff – vocals, producer (track 14), executive producer
- Madame Dee – vocals (tracks: 1, 3, 13, 15)
- Odion "12 O'Clock" Turner – vocals (tracks: 1, 9)
- Julio "Chi-King" Torres – vocals (track 1)
- CCF Division – vocals (track 4)
- Timothy "Freemurder" Drayton – vocals (track 5)
- Yung Masta – vocals (tracks: 5, 8)
- Jon "J. Wells" Wells – vocals & producer (track 5)
- Scotty – vocals (tracks: 10, 15)
- Armel Myers – vocals (track 11)
- Thaddaeus "Sharecka" Birkett – vocals (track 11)
- Frederick "60 Second Assassin" Cuffie – vocals (track 11)
- Aleksei – vocals (track 14)
- C Natural – keyboards (tracks: 1, 12, 13), bass (tracks: 12, 13), co-producer (track 7)
- DJ Obscene – scratches (track 12)
- Michael Baiardi – bass (tracks: 13, 14), keyboards (track 13), guitar & vibraphone (track 14), producer (track 6), mixing (tracks: 1–3, 6, 7, 9–15)
- David Roma – additional keyboards (track 14)
- Bennie "B Original" Williams – producer (tracks: 1, 3, 6, 7, 9, 12, 13), A&R
- Frédéric "DJ Battle" Marionnaud – producer (track 2)
- François "Keno" Dauchet – producer (track 2)
- Robert "RZA" Diggs – producer & mixing (tracks: 4, 10)
- Osvaldo "Leggezin" Ferreira – producer & co-mixing (track 8)
- Filf Rich Obscene Machine Corp. – producer (track 11)
- K Beats Kolossal – producer (tracks: 14, 15)
- Kris Solem – mastering
- Will Ragland – art direction
- Scott Council – photography
- Mark Copeland – A&R
- Tariq Peru – A&R
