= The Book of Shabazz (Hidden Scrollz) =

Studio album by Shabazz the Disciple
- Released: October 7, 2003
- Recorded: 1995–2003
- Studio: Firehouse Studio (New York, NY); Buhdha's House; House Of Hits (Chestnut Ridge, NY); Tucan Studio (Kornwestheim, Germany); YB Studios (São Paulo, Brazil); D&D Studios (New York, NY); Streetlight Studios (New York, NY); Frico's Lab (Leonberg, Germany)
- Genre: Hip hop
- Length: 1:11:16
- Label: Battle Axe Records
- Producer: Baby J; Carlos Bess; Dams & Sla; DJ Friction; DJ Irfane; DJ Skinny; Jose "Choco" Reynoso; Lord Jamar; MistaJam; Shabazz the Disciple; The Prunes; Zé Gonzales

Shabazz the Disciple chronology
The Book of Shabazz (Hidden Scrollz) (2003)	The Passion of the Hood Christ (2006)

Singles from The Book of Shabazz (Hidden Scrollz)
- 1. "Crime Saga" Released: January 23, 1996; 2. "Ghetto Apostles" Released: September 28, 1998; 3. "Red Hook Day/Thieves in da Nite" Released: September 8, 2003

Professional ratings
Review scores
Source	Rating
AllMusic	3/5 stars
RapReviews	7/10

The Book of Shabazz (Hidden Scrollz) is the debut solo studio album by American rapper Shabazz the Disciple. It was released on October 7, 2003, through Battle Axe Records. Recording sessions took place between 1995 and 2003 at Firehouse Studio, D&D Studios and Streetlight Studios in New York City, at Buhdha's House, at House Of Hits in Chestnut Ridge, at Tucan Studio in Kornwestheim, at YB Studios in São Paulo, and at Frico's Lab in Leonberg. Production was handled by Baby J, DJ Irfane, Lord Jamar, Carlos Bess, Dams & Sla, DJ Friction, DJ Skinny, Jose "Choco" Reynoso, MistaJam, The Prunes, Zé Gonzales, and Shabazz himself, with Madchild serving as executive producer. It features guest appearances from Freestyle, Killah Priest, Lil' Dap, Lord Jamar, Poetic, R.H. Bless and Young Anutt.

== Track listing ==
No.	Title	Producer(s)	Length
1.	"The Opening (Intro)" (featuring Young Anutt)	Dams & Sla	0:30
2.	"Righteous Chamba (Skit)"	Shabazz the Disciple	1:05
3.	"Red Hook Day"	MistaJam	4:46
4.	"1st Annual Bootleg Music Awards"	Shabazz the Disciple	3:00
5.	"Hip Pop"	DJ Skinny	4:14
6.	"Oasis"	DJ Irfane	6:16
7.	"Surrender (Thieves in da Nite Pt. 2)"	Shabazz the Disciple; Zé Gonzales	4:01
8.	"BKBS"	DJ Irfane	4:05
9.	"Son Rise (Leek Lover Interlude)"	Shabazz the Disciple	1:38
10.	"Cremate 'Em"	The Prunes	3:22
11.	"Crime Saga"	C12	4:28
12.	"Passover (Skit)"	Shabazz the Disciple	0:57
13.	"Street Parables" (featuring Lord Jamar)	Lord Jamar	5:05
14.	"Thieves in da Night (Heist)" (featuring Killah Priest and Lil' Dap)	Q-Unique	5:23
15.	"Organized Rime Pt. 2"	Lord Jamar	4:33
16.	"Blasphemy"	DJ Friction	4:21
17.	"Ghetto Apostles" (featuring Poetic, Freestyle and R.H. Bless)	Baby J	4:06
18.	"The Lamb's Blood"	Baby J	4:05
19.	"War Trilogy (P.O.W. - Projects of War)" (featuring Freestyle)	Baby J	1:22
20.	"War Trilogy (M.I.A. - Militia Incarcerated Alien)"	Baby J	2:05
21.	"War Trilogy (Ambush)" (featuring Freestyle)	Baby J	1:54
Total length:			1:11:16

== Personnel ==
- David "Shabazz the Disciple" Collins – vocals, producer (tracks: 2, 4, 7, 9, 12)
- Young Anutt – vocals (track 1)
- Lorenzo "Lord Jamar" DeChalus – vocals (track 13), producer (tracks: 13, 15)
- Walter "Killah Priest" Reed – vocals (track 14)
- James "Lil' Dap" Heath – vocals (track 14)
- Anthony Ian Berkeley – vocals (track 17)
- Robert "Freestyle" Wallace – vocals (tracks: 17, 19, 21)
- Rasheen "R.H. Bless" Hill – vocals (track 17)
- Dams & Sla – producers (track 1)
- Peter "MistaJam" Dalton – producer & engineering (track 3)
- DJ Skinny – producer (track 5)
- Christopher Irfane Khan-Acito – producer (tracks: 6, 8)
- José Henrique Castanho de Godoy Pinheiro – producer (track 7)
- Simon Bonde – producer (track 10)
- Christian Buksti – producer (track 10)
- Peder Pedersen – producer (track 10)
- Carlos Bess – producer (track 11), recording (tracks: 2, 11, 13, 14, 17, 18, 21), mixing (tracks: 11, 13, 14, 17)
- Jose "Choco" Reynoso – producer (track 11)
- Anthony "Q-Unique" Quiles – producer (track 14)
- Martin "DJ Friction" Welzer – producer & engineering (track 16)
- Jonathan "Baby J" Hewitt – producer & mixing (tracks: 17–21)
- Richard "Joe Buhdha" Douglas – recording & mixing (track 3)
- Marlon "Marley Marl" Williams – recording (track 4), mixing (track 5)
- Elliott Thomas – mixing (tracks: 4, 10), recording (track 10)
- Tejo Damasceno – recording (tracks: 5, 7), mixing (track 7)
- Martin Renius – recording (tracks: 6, 9), mixing (track 6)
- Ralf Christian Mayer – recording (track 8)
- Wolfgang Amadeus – mixing (track 8)
- Benn Starr – recording (tracks: 17, 19, 21), mixing (track 17)
- Shane "Madchild" Bunting – executive producer
