= Sam Spiegel (musician) =

American musician (born 1979)

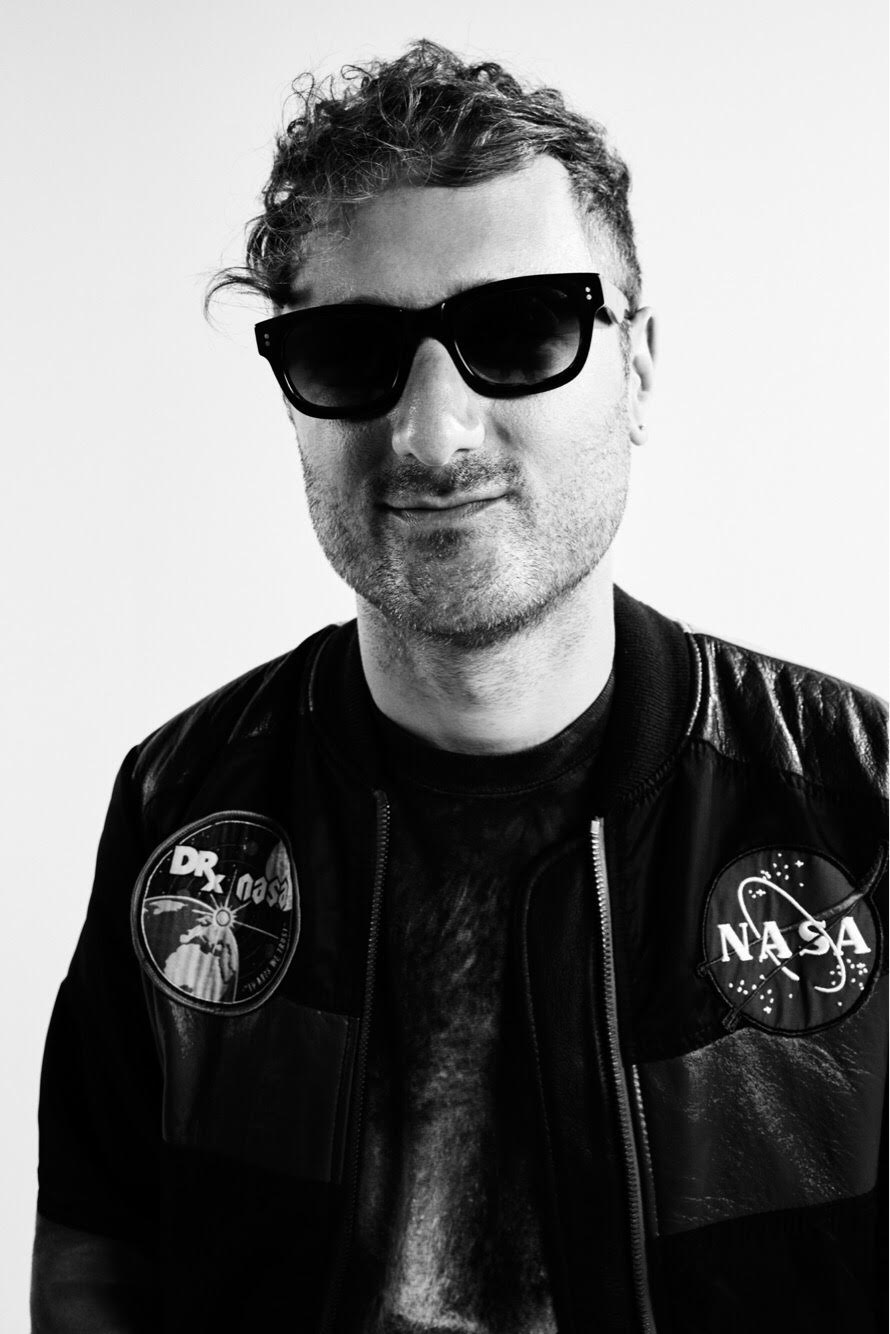
- Spiegel in 2019
- Born: October 31, 1979 (age 46)
- Other names: Sam Spiegel; Squeak E. Clean (former)
- Occupations: Musician; composer; record producer; DJ
- Years active: 1999–present
- Relatives: Spike Jonze (brother); Arthur Spiegel (great-grandfather); Joseph Spiegel (great-great-grandfather)

Sam Spiegel (born October 31, 1979), known by the stage name Sam i and previously as Squeak E. Clean, is an American DJ, record producer, composer, and director from New York City.

In addition to creating his own material, Spiegel has worked with musicians such as Kanye West, Lizzo, Sia, Busta Rhymes, Doja Cat, Anderson .Paak, M.I.A., Maroon 5, and the Yeah Yeah Yeahs and many more. He has scored commercials for companies including Converse, Levi's, Kenzo x H&M, Reebok, ESPN, T Mobile, Jose Cuervo, and Saturn. His production company scored the video game Skate 2. Though he attempts to create music free of record label restraints, Spiegel also licenses his songs whenever possible so as to maximize exposure for his work. He formerly produced albums under the name Squeak E. Clean.

Spiegel is the brother of film director Spike Jonze. They collaborated on the Adidas TV commercial Hello Tomorrow, for which Spiegel created the score sung by Karen O. The titular song briefly reached No. 1 on the iTunes singles chart. Spiegel also wrote the score for Jonze's 2010 short film I'm Here, and produced an original song "Mutant Brain" with Ape Drums featuring Assassin for Jonze's Kenzo World advertisement.

Spiegel is a founding partner of Squeak E. Clean Studios. They have studios in L.A., New York, Chicago, Austin, Sydney and Melbourne.

== Music ==
2009 saw the release of one of Sam's music projects, N.A.S.A.'s (North America South America) landmark debut LP, The Spirit of Apollo. Created with long time Brazilian music partner DJ Zegon.

The Spirit of Apollo includes Kanye West, Karen O and Nick Zinner of Yeah Yeah Yeahs, Lykke Li, John Frusciante of Red Hot Chili Peppers, Tom Waits, Nina Persson of The Cardigans, George Clinton, David Byrne, M.I.A., RZA, Method Man, Ghostface Killah, and Ol' Dirty Bastard of Wu-Tang Clan while the corresponding music videos feature animated/live action collaborations by visual artists including Shepard Fairey, Sage Vaughn, Marcel Dzama, and The Date Farmers. Such collaborations earned Spiegel the title "King Sam" on Rolling Stone's annual "Hot List" in 2008. The album was "a conscious effort by NASA to show how people can be brought together by music and art."

Spiegel's project, Maximum Hedrum, brought him together with Harold Faltermeyer and Derrick Green (of Sepultura). In 2011 "Keep in Touch (Feel Me)" feat. George Clinton, was licensed to a BlackBerry commercial. In November 2012 "Keep in Touch (Feel Me)" and "Synthesize", two tracks from the upcoming album, were released commercially on iTunes and Amazon.com, as well as via free download from SoundCloud and Facebook. "Synthesize" was featured in Girl Skateboards film, Pretty Sweet.

In 2016, Spiegel began releasing music under his own name, Sam Spiegel. The first release under this new moniker was "Mutant Brain (feat. Assassin)" which he produced with Miami-based DJ and producer, Ape Drums and released through Interscope Records. "Mutant Brain" was featured in the Spike Jonze-directed short film, "Kenzo World, A New Fragrance", for the French brand Kenzo.

This music went on to win gold for the Use of Original Music in Film Craft at the Cannes Lions, as well as winning the Best Music category at the AICP One Show and Best Use of Original Music by a Music House at the Guild of Music Supervisors Awards.

In 2020, Spiegel changed his name to Sam i and released his first solo album, Random Shit From The Internet Era. The album was a critical success and featured notable talent including Sia, Busta Rhymes, CeeLo Green, Anderson .Paak, Doja Cat, RZA and many more.

In addition, Sam has been working frequently with artist Jean Paul Goude in creating music for Jean Paul's work with Chanel, Lacoste, Kenzo X H&M, Roger Vivier, and Pompidou.

Sam continues to release his own music, produce for other artists while directing and growing Squeak E. Clean Studios.

== Directing ==
2015 saw Sam take on directing. His self funded music video for the final N.A.S.A. song, "Jihad Love Squad" was shot in India and directed and produced by Spiegel himself. Following the release of the "Jihad Love Squad" video, Sam signed to Hey Wonderful, a division of RSA Films, as a director. This led to Sam directing two National Geographic short films as well as CNN's first live commercial, which aired at 11:35 Eastern on New Year's Eve, 2017, during CNN's NYE Countdown and received nearly 3.3 million live viewers. Sam has continued his passion for directing into the 2018 year, with an Instagram interview campaign shot in May 2018 for Pride Month featuring LGBTQ advocates and their role models. In September Sam also conceptualized, directed and wrote "Wu-Tang in Space Eating Impossible Sliders" a branded content mini web series starring Wu-Tang Clan flying through space and postulating on the universe. The series highlighted the new partnership between Impossible Foods and White Castle.

== Music direction and other work ==
On August 18, 2010, the Standard New York Hotel was the setting for a harmonically synchronized light and sound show produced by Spiegel. The Target Kaleidoscopic Fashion Spectacular featured a fashion show on the street level, while inside the hotel, 66 dancers performed choreography synchronized with fast-paced lighting patterns set to Spiegel's music score in 150 different rooms, using the glass walls of the hotel to display a multi-floor show, highlighting that year's fall styles.

Spiegel was pivotal to the project as he not only created the score but brought together many of the other contributing artists as well. The show featured the creative direction of Mother New York, the directors at LEGS, lighting choreographers at Bionic League (who have worked with Daft Punk and Kanye West), and the dance choreographer Sir Ryan Heffington.

Spiegel was the music director for Kanye West's critically acclaimed 2008 world Glow in the Dark Tour.

Spiegel also worked on a "psycho-opera", entitled Stop The Virgens, spearheaded by his good friend, and front woman of the Yeah Yeah Yeahs, Karen O. The show is self-described as "an assault on the tragic joys of youth." The opera premiered at St. Ann's Warehouse in Brooklyn, New York, on October 12, 2011, and hosted eight performances, concluding on October 22, 2011. It was produced by The Creators Project and directed by Adam Rapp. The opera served as a live version of the songs from an album that Spiegel produced and wrote with Karen O. Spiegel, along with the guitarist from the Yeah Yeah Yeahs, Nick Zinner, served as musical directors. Also contributing to the "original live xperience" were musicians Money Mark, Brian Chase, Jack Lawrence and Patrick Keeler of the Greenhornes/Racanteours. Also credited for his work with the sound design of the project was Andrés Velásquez.

in 2017, Spiegel music directed and composed all of the original music for Opening Ceremony's "Changers' a Dance Story" directed by Spike Jonze, starring Lakeith Stanfield and Mia Wasikowska.

== Producer discography ==
Year	Artist	Song	Album
2005	Fatlip	"Today's Your Day"; "Freaky Bumps"	"The Loneliest Punk"
2005	Karen O	"Get um On the Run"; "Canada"; "Duet"; "Calm Like a Boy"; "Doowap Jam"; "Black Book"; "Sugar"; "Thursday"; "Last Lullaby"	"Stop The Virgens"
2005	Squeak E. Clean	"Scratch-a-thon"; "Brazil Club"; "Today's Your Day (Whachagonedu?)"; "Martian Sunrise"; "India"; "Isaac"; "Ice Creamy"; "Hip-Hop" (Instrumental); "Krusty"; "Once Again…"; "I Win, U Lose"; "Porno"; "What?"; "Invisiboard"; "Planet Chocolate"	"Yeah Right" and "Hot Chocolate" Scores
2006	Donavon Frankenreiter	"Turn On Your Heart"	"Move By Yourself"
2006	Swollen Members	"Go To Sleep"	"Black Magic"
2006	Yeah Yeah Yeahs	"Gold Lion"; "Way Out"; "Fancy"; "Phenomena"; "Honeybear"; "Cheated Hearts"; "Dudley"; "Mysteries"; "The Sweets"; "Warrior"; "Turn Into"; "Deja Vu" (UK Version)	"Show Your Bones"
2008	Crystal Castles	"Courtship Dating"; "Through the Hosiery"; "Black Panther"; "Untrust Us"; "Alice Practice"	"Crystal Castles"
2008	Donavon Frankenreiter	"Life, Love, and Laughter"	"Pass It Around"
2009	N.A.S.A.	"Intro"; "The People Tree" (Feat. David Byrne, Chali 2na, Gift Of Gab & Z-Trip); "Money" (feat. David Byrne, Chuck D, Ras Congo, Seu Jorge & Z-Trip); "N.A.S.A. Music" (Feat. Method Man, E-40 & DJ Swamp); "Way Down" (feat. RZA, Barbie Hatch & John Frusciante); "Hip Hop" (Feat. KRS-One, Fatlip & Slim Kid Tre); "Four Rooms, Earth View"; "Strange Enough" (Feat. Karen O, Ol' Dirty Bastard & Fatlip); "Spacious Thoughts" (Feat. Tom Waits & Kool Keith); "Gifted" (Feat. Kanye West, Santogold & Lykke Li); "A Volta" (Feat. Sizzla, Amanda Blank & Lovefoxxx); "There's A Party" (Feat. George Clinton & Chali 2na); "Whachadoin?" (Feat. Spank Rock, M.I.A., Santogold & Nick Zinner); "O Pato" (Feat. Kool Kojak & DJ Babao); "Electric Flowers" (Mario C. Remix feat. Nina Persson & RZA) (Bonus Track); "We Gotta Mess To Make" (Feat. Jimmy from Brother Reade); "The Ultimate" (Feat. Fatlip & Gift of Gab); "One Time" (Feat. Fatlip)	"The Spirit of Apollo"
2009	Yeah Yeah Yeahs	"Zero" (N.A.S.A. Bloody Lobo Remix)	
2010	N.A.S.A.	"The Big Bang"; "Gifted" (Boombotz Remix); "I Wanna Be Your Lover"; "Whatchadoin" (Boombottz); "Way Down" (Jupiter Remix)	"The Big Bang"
2011	Crystal Castles	"Baptism"; "Celestica"	"(II)"
2012	Maroon 5	"Wasted Years"	"Overexposed"
2012	Maximum Hedrum	"Synthesize"	"Synthesize"
2012	Squeak E. Clean	"Blue Cabaret"; "Blue Mambo"; "Blue One"; "Green"; "Kaleidoscopic"; "Red"; "White"	"Kaleidoscopic"
2013	Childish Gambino	"I. Crawl"; "IV. Sweatpants"; "II. Zealots of Stockholm"	"Because The Internet"
2013	Maximum Hedrum	"Castles"; "Keep In Touch"; "RoboIntro"; "RoboSexual"; "Glasshouse"; "Ph.D"; "Imperfectly Mine"; "Sext Lectures"; "Synthesize"; "Deeper Than Charlie"; "Hugz For Everybody"; "Goodbye Love"; "Belly Of The Beast"	"Maximum Hedrum"
2013	N.A.S.A.	"Hide" (feat. Aynzli Jones)	"Hide"
2013	Yeah Yeah Yeahs	"Buried Alive"; "Mosquito" (N.A.S.A. Sucks Theramin Remix)	"Mosquito"
2014	Ben Lee	"Sense"; "Underground"; "You're The Reason; "Just Like In Jerusalem"; "You Confuse Me"; "Life As Usual"; "Love Won't Let You Down"; "Protect Me"; "Static"; "Hello Tomorrow"; "Turn Back Now"	"A mixtape from Ben Lee"
2014	N.A.S.A.	"I Shot the Sheriff" (feat. Karen O)	"I Shot the Sheriff"
2014	N.A.S.A.	"Hide" (Tropkillaz Remix)	"Hide"
2015	LCD Sound System	"My Problem Friend is Ruining Our Night" (feat. Childish Gambino & Fatlip)	"My Problem Friend is Ruining Our Night"
2015	Lizzo	"Ain't I"	"Big Grrrl Small World"
2015	N.A.S.A.	"Hands Up Don't Shoot"	"Hands Up Don't Shoot"
2015	N.A.S.A.	"Iko" (feat. Lizzo)	"Iko"
2015	N.A.S.A.	"Meltdown" (ft. DMX & Priyanka Chopra)	"Meltdown"
2015	N.A.S.A.	"Jihad Love Squad" (ft. KRS-One)	"Jihad Love Squad"
2015	Squeak E. Clean	Right Now (feat. Hafro)	Right Now
2016	N.A.S.A.	"We Takin' Over" (ft. Fatlip & Kate Boy)	"We Takin' Over"
2016	Sam i & Tropkillaz	"Look Alive" (feat. Rae Sremmurd Tropkillaz Remix)	"Look Alive"
2016	Sam i	Doin' Alright	"Doin' Alright"
2016	Sam i	Mutant Brain	"Mutant Brain"
2017	Brooke Candy	"Living Out Loud" (feat. Sia)	"Living Out Loud"
2017	Squeak E. Clean	"Frozen"; "Joy"; "Planet Glazed"; "River of Cause"; "Lettuce" (feat. Andres Velasquez); "K.O" (feat. Immad Wasif)	"Genius"
2017	Squeak E. Clean	"I Am the Cosmos"	"I Am the Cosmos"
2018	Squeak E. Clean	"Da Diddy Da" (feat. Gigarok)	"Da Diddy Da"
2019	Squeak E. Clean	"We've Only Begun" (feat. Stacy Clark)	"We've Only Begun"
2020	Sam i	"Goin' Home"; "Perfect" (w/ Tropkillaz feat. BIA, MC Pikachu); "Used to be my Homie" (feat. BJ the Chicago Kid & Freddie Gibbs); "Don't Give Up" (feat. Sia, Busta Rhymes & Vic Mensa); "Wishin'" (feat. Bipolar Sunshine); "One Last Time" (feat. Goldilox); "To Whom It May Concern" (feat. Ceelo Green, Theophilus London & Alex Ebert); "20 Below" (feat. Anderson .Paak & Doja Cat); "Champagne" (feat Aynzli Jones); "Crew" (feat. Elliphant & Agent Sasco (AKA Assassin)); "Ride" (feat. RZA & Barbie Hatch)	"Random Shit From The Internet Era"
2020	Squeak E. Clean	"Tom's Diner"; "Hump and Jump" (feat. Soko); "Hello Tomorrow Rebirth"	"Squeak E. Clean Studios: Vol 1"
2020	TRY	"Hyperspace"	"Hyperspace"
2022	TRY	"Aphrodite"; "Clarity" (feat. EARTHGANG); "Silence" (feat. Camden & Miette Hope); "End of Times"	"Chapter One"
2022	TRY	"End of Times" (Couros Remix); "Silence" (Redux); "Aphrodite Part II" (with Killah Priest)	"Chapter One" (Remixes)
2023	TRY	"Fire Sign" (feat. Mikky Ekko)	"Fire Sign"
2023	TRY	"Fire Sign" (RAC Mix)	"Fire Sign" (RAC Mix)
