= Saviorz Day =

Studio album by Sunz of Man
- Released: September 3, 2002
- Studio: Nightcrawler Studios (Brooklyn, NY)
- Genre: Hip-hop
- Length: 59:56
- Label: D3; Riviera
- Producer: Data; Fatal Son; Joe Loopz; John The Baptist; Linx; RZA; The Bullets; The Platinum Brothers

Sunz of Man chronology
The First Testament (1999)	Saviorz Day (2002)	The Old Testament (2006)

Professional ratings
Review scores
Source	Rating
AllMusic	3/5 stars
HipHopDX	2.5/5

Saviorz Day is the second studio album by American hip-hop trio Sunz of Man. It was released on September 3, 2002, through D3 Entertainment with distribution via Riviera Entertainment. Recording sessions took place at Nightcrawler Studios in Brooklyn. Production was handled by Linx, Joe Loopz, Data, Fatal Son, John The Baptist, RZA, the Bullets, and the Platinum Brothers. It features guest appearances from 12 O'Clock, Ancient Coins, Black Satin, Ghostface Killah, La the Darkman, Madame D, Makeba Mooncycle, MC Eiht, Method Man, Omar Conry, RZA, and Smooth. The group's fourth member, Killah Priest, did not participate in the recording of the album due to his earlier distancing from the group and subsequent focus on a solo career and the formation of The Hrsmn supergroup.

== Track listing ==
No.	Title	Writer(s)	Producer(s)	Length
1.	"Intro"	Chron Smith; Vergil Ruff; Frederick Cuffie; Robert Diggs	Linx	1:36
2.	"S.O.M."	Smith; Ruff	Linx	4:06
3.	"Ghettio" (featuring Two on the Road)	Smith; Ruff; Odion Turner	Linx	3:28
4.	"Banksta'z" (featuring RZA and 12 O'Clock)	Smith; Ruff; Diggs; Turner	John the Baptist	5:10
5.	"House of Blues" (featuring Madame D)	Ruff	Joe Loops	3:48
6.	"RZA Skit"		The Bullets	0:16
7.	"Saviorz Day" (featuring Ghostface Killah and Madame D)	Ruff; Dennis Coles	Fatal Son	4:56
8.	"Reality Skit"		RZA	0:13
9.	"Black or White" (featuring Ancient Coins)	Smith; Ruff; A. Myers; C. Ugbomah	DATA	3:37
10.	"The Trinity" (featuring Omar Conry)	Smith; Ruff	Linx	4:09
11.	"Dear Psalms" (featuring Smooth)	Smith	Linx	3:15
12.	"People Change" (featuring MC Eiht and Madame D)	Smith; Ruff; Cuffie; Aaron Tyler	The Platinum Brothers	4:01
13.	"Honey Tree" (featuring Two on the Road)	Ruff; Turner	Joe Loops	4:24
14.	"Time"	Cuffie	Linx	2:54
15.	"Doin Ya Thang" (featuring Makeba Mooncycle)	Smith; Ruff	Joe Loops	2:17
16.	"Say, Say, Say" (featuring Ancient Coins)	Smith; Ruff; Myers; Ugbomah	DATA	3:33
17.	"Industry" (featuring Ghostface Killah)		Linx	0:53
18.	"All We Got (US)" (featuring La the Darkman)	Smith; Ruff; Lason Jackson	Joe Loops	2:59
19.	"The Cause" (featuring Method Man)		Fatal Son	0:31
Total length:				59:56
