= The Last Shall Be First (Sunz of Man album) =

Studio album by Sunz of Man
- Released: July 21, 1998
- Recorded: 1996–1998
- Studios: Alien Flyers (New York, NY); Power Play Studios (Long Island, NY); The Enterprise (Burbank, CA); Magnet Vision Studios (Santa Monica, CA); D&D Studios (New York, NY); American Studios (Los Angeles, CA); Quad Recording Studios (Times Square, NY); 36 Chambers Studio (Manhattan, NY); Homeboy Studios (New York, NY); Platinum Island Studios (New York, NY)
- Genre: Hip hop
- Length: 1:12:42
- Labels: Threat; Red Ant
- Producers: Cathy Jones (exec.); Sunz of Man (exec.); 4th Disciple; RZA; Su-Preme; True Master; Wyclef Jean

Sunz of Man chronology
The Last Shall Be First (1998)	The First Testament (1999)

Singles from The Last Shall Be First
- 1. "Natural High" Released: 1997; 2. "Shining Star"/"Cold" Released: 1998; 3. "The Plan"/"Collaboration '98" Released: November 10, 1998

Professional ratings
Review scores
Source	Rating
AllMusic	4/5 stars
Robert Christgau	A−
The Source	3.5/5 stars
Spin	5/10

The Last Shall Be First is the debut studio album by American hip hop group Sunz of Man. It was released on July 21, 1998, through Red Ant Entertainment. Production was handled by 4th Disciple, True Master, RZA, Supreme and Wyclef Jean, with Cathy Jones and Sunz of Man serving as executive producers. It features guest appearances from Method Man, Traybag, Beretta 9, Earth, Wind & Fire, Masta Killa, Ol' Dirty Bastard, Raekwon and U-God.

The album peaked at number 20 on the Billboard 200 and number 7 on the Top R&B/Hip-Hop Albums in the United States, as well as number 100 on the Dutch Album Top 100.

== Track listing ==
No.	Title	Writer(s)	Producer(s)	Length
1.	"Intro"			1:07
2.	"Cold"	Chron Smith; Vergil Ruff; Selwyn Bogard	4th Disciple	3:49
3.	"Natural High" (featuring Tray Bag)	Chron Smith; Ruff; Walter Reed; Tracy Smith; Alaric Wilder; Rob Chiarelli	Supreme	4:15
4.	"Flaming Swords"	Chron Smith; Ruff; Frederick Cuffie; Reed; Derek Harris	True Master	5:18
5.	"Illusions" (featuring Masta Killa)	Chron Smith; Ruff; Cuffie; Elgin Turner; Bogard	4th Disciple	5:25
6.	"Shining Star" (featuring Ol' Dirty Bastard and Earth, Wind & Fire)	Chron Smith; Ruff; Cuffie; Russell Jones; Maurice White; Philip Bailey; Larry Dunn; Wyclef Jean	Wyclef Jean	4:21
7.	"Israeli News" (featuring Tray Bag)	Chron Smith; Reed; T. Smith; Wilder	Supreme	4:13
8.	"Tribulations"	Chron Smith; Ruff; Cuffie; Reed; Robert Diggs	RZA	4:25
9.	"The Interview"			1:05
10.	"The Plan"	Ruff; Cuffie; Bogard	4th Disciple	5:09
11.	"Collaboration '98" (featuring Method Man and True Master)	Chron Smith; Ruff; Clifford Smith; Harris	True Master	5:11
12.	"Inmates to the Fire"	Chron Smith; Cuffie; Ruff; Diggs	RZA	3:41
13.	"Not Promised Tomorrow"	Chron Smith; Cuffie; Ruff; Bogard	4th Disciple	4:11
14.	"For the Lust of Money / The Grandz"	Cuffie; Ruff; Chron Smith; Harris	True Master	5:54
15.	"Can I See You?"	Ruff; Chron Smith; Diggs	RZA	3:27
16.	"The Battle"			1:08
17.	"Next Up" (featuring Method Man)	Cuffie; Ruff; Chron Smith; Clifford Smith; Harris	True Master	3:57
18.	"Intellectuals" (featuring Raekwon and U-God)	Chron Smith; Cuffie; Corey Woods; Lamont Hawkins; Harris	True Master	4:55
19.	"Five Arch Angels"			1:11
Total length:				1:12:42

== Personnel ==
- Chron "Hell Razah" Smith – vocals (tracks: 2–8, 11–15, 17, 18), A&R
- Virgil "Prodigal Sunn" Ruff – vocals (tracks: 2–6, 8, 10–15, 17)
- Frederick "60 Second Assassin" Cuffie – vocals (tracks: 4–6, 8, 10, 12–14, 17, 18)
- Walter "Killah Priest" Reed – vocals (tracks: 3, 4, 7, 8)
- Tracy "Trebag" Smith – vocals (tracks: 3, 7)
- Clifford "Method Man" Smith – vocals (tracks: 11, 17)
- Elgin "Masta Killa" Turner – vocals (track 5)
- Russell "Ol' Dirty Bastard" Jones – vocals (track 6)
- Earth, Wind & Fire – vocals (track 6)
- Derek "True Master" Harris – vocals (track 11), producer (tracks: 4, 11, 14, 17, 18), mixing (tracks: 11, 17, 18)
- Corey "Raekwon" Woods – vocals (track 18)
- Lamont "U-God" Hawkins – vocals (track 18)
- Lashaunda "Harmony" – backing vocals (track 14)
- Selwyn "4th Disciple" Bogard – producer (tracks: 2, 5, 10, 13), mixing (track 2)
- Robert "RZA" Diggs – producer (tracks: 8, 12, 15), engineering (track 12)
- Alaric "Supreme" Wilder – producer (tracks: 3, 7)
- Rob Chiarelli – additional producer (tracks: 3, 4, 7, 8, 10, 12, 13, 15), mixing (tracks: 3, 4, 6–8, 10, 12–15), additional mixing (track 17)
- Nolan 'Dr. No' Moffitte – engineering (tracks: 2, 5, 10, 11, 17, 18)
- Carlos Bess – engineering (tracks: 4, 8, 15)
- Tony Black – engineering (track 3)
- Steve Hall – mastering
- Cathy Jones – executive producer
- Tom Jermann – art direction, design
- Michael Lavine – photography
- Meredith Brunswick – A&R
- Tony Calcote – A&R
- James Elliott – A&R

== Charts ==
Chart (1998)	Peak position
Dutch Albums (Album Top 100)	100
US Billboard 200	20
US Top R&B Albums (Billboard)	7
