= Michael Baiardi =

- Also known as: Mike Baiardi
- Born: Michael John Baiardi; September 11, 1972 (age 54); New York City
- Genres: Film score, Pop, Rock, Hip Hop
- Occupations: Composer, Songwriter, Music Producer
- Instruments: Guitar, Piano, Orchestral
- Years active: 1996–present

Michael Baiardi (born September 11, 1972 in New York City) is an American composer, songwriter and music producer who currently resides in Los Angeles, California.

Baiardi's songs and compositions have appeared in hundreds of feature films, television shows and albums. Most notable are songs in feature films such as The Avengers (2012), Magic Mike (2012), The Taking of Pelham 123 (2009), Greenberg (2010), and Mad Money (2008). Also notable music contributions are TV shows such as Modern Family, Dexter, Justified, Law & Order, CSI, and Jersey Shore.

== Career ==
Michael Baiardi is a graduate of Berklee College of Music. In his early career he performed in a variety of rock and pop groups in the Boston and New York areas. He relocated to Los Angeles in 1998 and began working in house at record labels such as Sony Music, Priority Records and Capitol Records. In 2001 he created the music production company Soundfile Productions Inc. He currently works out of his studio in Los Angeles and provides music to over 50 film and television productions per year.

== Filmography ==
Year	Title	Credit	Film/ Television
2012	The Avengers	Songwriter, Music Producer, Performer	Film
2012	Magic Mike	Songwriter, Music Producer, Performer	Film
2012	Deadfall	Songwriter, Music Producer, Performer	Film
2012	Nitro Circus: The Movie	Songwriter, Music Producer, Performer	Film
2012	The Cottage	Composer	Film
2012	Alaska: The Last Frontier	Composer	Television
2012	The Real Housewives of Beverly Hills	Composer	Television
2012	Jersey Shore	Composer	Television
2012	Teen Mom	Composer	Television
2012	Teen Mom 2	Composer	Television
2012	Food for Thought with Claire Thomas	Composer	Television
2012	Ocean Mysteries with Jeff Corwin	Composer	Television
2012	Culture Click	Composer	Television
2012	Collection Intervention	Composer	Television
2012	Hell And Back: Special Operations Rangers	Composer	Television
2012	Snooki & JWoww	Composer	Television
2012	Fantasy Factory	Composer	Television
2011	Something Borrowed	Songwriter, Music Producer, Performer	Film
2011	Honey 2	Songwriter, Music Producer, Performer	Film
2011	Dexter	Songwriter, Music Producer, Performer	Television
2011	Justified	Songwriter, Music Producer, Performer	Television
2011	Covert Affairs	Songwriter, Music Producer, Performer	Television
2011	Who Do You Think You Are?	Composer	Television
2011	63rd Primetime Emmy Awards	Composer	Television
2011	16 And Pregnant	Composer	Television
2011	The T.O. Show	Composer	Television
2011	H8R	Composer	Television
2011	Desert Car Kings	Composer	Television
2011	Shedding For The Wedding	Composer	Television
2011	Ridiculousness	Composer	Television
2011	America's Best Dance Crew	Composer	Television
2011	Car Warriors	Composer	Television
2010	Greenberg	Songwriter, Music Producer, Performer	Film
2010	Made: The Movie	Songwriter, Music Producer, Performer	Film
2010	The Deep End	Songwriter, Music Producer, Performer	Television
2010	Blue Mountain State	Songwriter, Music Producer, Performer	Television
2010	Shear Genius	Composer	Television
2010	Surviving the Cut	Composer	Television
2010	Hollywood Is Like High School With Money	Composer	Television
2010	The Buried Life	Composer	Television
2010	Tough Love	Composer	Television
2009	The Taking of Pelham 123	Songwriter, Music Producer, Performer	Film
2009	Afro Samurai: Resurrection	Songwriter, Music Producer, Performer	Film
2009	Modern Family	Songwriter, Music Producer, Performer	Television
2009	Make It or Break It	Songwriter, Music Producer, Performer	Television
2009	CSI	Songwriter, Music Producer, Performer	Television
2009	The Imploders	Composer	Television
2009	Two Weeks In Hell	Composer	Television
2009	No Heroics	Composer	Television
2009	Stars On Stars	Composer	Television
2008	Mad Money	Songwriter, Music Producer, Performer	Film
2008	Step Up 2: The Streets	Songwriter, Music Producer, Performer	Film
2008	Prom Night	Songwriter, Music Producer, Performer	Film
2008	Harold & Kumar Escape from Guantanamo Bay	Songwriter, Music Producer, Performer	Film
2008	American Son	Songwriter, Music Producer, Performer	Film
2008	No Place Like Home	Composer	Film
2008	Shadow Force	Composer	Television
2008	Smallville	Songwriter, Music Producer, Performer	Television
2008	Fear Itself	Songwriter, Music Producer, Performer	Television
2007	Waitress	Music Producer, Performer	Film
2007	War	Songwriter, Music Producer, Performer	Film
2007	Urban Justice	Songwriter, Music Producer, Performer	Film
2007	Feel the Noise	Songwriter, Music Producer, Performer	Film
2007	Afro Samurai	Composer	Television
2007	Law & Order	Songwriter, Music Producer, Performer	Television
2007	Cane	Songwriter, Music Producer, Performer	Television
2007	October Road	Songwriter, Music Producer, Performer	Television
2007	Shark	Songwriter, Music Producer, Performer	Television
2007	Dirt	Songwriter, Music Producer, Performer	Television
2006	Danika	Songwriter, Music Producer, Performer	Film
2006	Farce of the Penguins	Songwriter, Music Producer, Performer	Film
2006	The Protector	Songwriter, Music Producer, Performer	Film
2006	Sleeper Cell	Songwriter, Music Producer, Performer	Television
2006	Conviction	Songwriter, Music Producer, Performer	Television
2006	Heist	Songwriter, Music Producer, Performer	Television
