= Razah's Ladder =

Studio album by Blue Sky Black Death & Hell Razah
- Released: October 23, 2007
- Genre: Hip-hop
- Length: 45:28
- Label: Babygrande Records
- Producer: Blue Sky Black Death

Blue Sky Black Death chronology
The Holocaust (2006)	Razah's Ladder (2007)	Late Night Cinema (2008)

Hell Razah chronology
Renaissance Child (2007)	Razah's Ladder (2007)	Welcome to Red Hook Houses (2008)

Professional ratings
Review scores
Source	Rating
Prefix	7.5/10
RapReviews	8.5/10

Razah's Ladder is a collaborative studio album by the American hip-hop production duo Blue Sky Black Death and the American rapper Hell Razah. It was released by Babygrande Records in 2007.

== Production ==
The album title refers to the Bible story of Jacob's Ladder. Razah said the album "reps me escalating in my career", and would lead-in to his following solo project, titled Heaven Razah. After the recent death of his father, Razah decided to take the album in a deeper, spiritual direction. Blue Sky Black Death said that the album's production was not as dark or as sinister as the production on their previous project with the Wu-Tang affiliate Holocaust, calling it an "uplifting album" with more soulful beats requested by Razah.

== Release ==
Blue Sky Black Death said that there would be no singles released from the album, calling them "obsolete" for underground artists. Instead the entire project was released on vinyl as well as CD.

== Track listing ==
No.	Title	Length
1.	"Elevation"	1:32
2.	"Razah's Ladder"	2:34
3.	"The Cube"	3:41
4.	"Halos" (featuring Crooked I)	4:23
5.	"Most Merciful"	1:53
6.	"Audiobiography" (featuring Shabazz the Disciple)	4:34
7.	"Pray Together"	3:58
8.	"Poor Righteous Dreams"	2:59
9.	"Better than Jewelry"	3:18
10.	"Project Prophecy" (featuring Ill Bill and Sabac Red)	4:10
11.	"Painted Jezebels"	4:10
12.	"Written in Blood" (featuring Prodigal Sunn)	3:16
13.	"Stairway to Heaven"	2:55
14.	"Sun of Man"	3:26

== Personnel ==
Credits adapted from liner notes.

- Hell Razah – vocals
- Blue Sky Black Death – production, arrangement
- MadAdam – turntables (3, 4, 5, 7, 9, 10, 11)
- Evan Gordon – keyboards (2, 4, 8, 10), synthesizer (3, 10), guitar (5)
- Crooked I – vocals (4)
- Shabazz the Disciple – vocals (6)
- Ill Bill – vocals (10)
- Sabac Red – vocals (10)
- Prodigal Sunn – vocals (12)
- Crown Prince Universal – vocals (1, 14)
- Ashley Wise – vocals (14)
- Michael Tabie – design
- Jesse Stone – marketing
- Willy Friedman – marketing
- Ben Dotson – marketing
- Milo Pullman – marketing
