= Welcome to Red Hook Houses =

Studio album by T.H.U.G. Angelz (Hell Razah & Shabazz)
- Released: July 8, 2008
- Studio: Top Of The Building Studios; Duckdown Studios
- Genre: Hip-hop
- Label: Babygrande
- Producer: Blue Sky Black Death; Bond; Bronze Nazareth; DJ Rated R; Hell Razah; Jordan River Banks; RNS; Shawneci; Shroom; Smokeshop Productions; Spell; Vanderslice

Hell Razah chronology
Razah's Ladder (2007)	Welcome to Red Hook Houses (2008)	Ultra Sounds of a Renaissance Child (2008)

Shabazz the Disciple chronology
The Passion of the Hood Christ (2006)	Welcome to Red Hook Houses (2008)	Hood Scripturez (2010)

Professional ratings
Review scores
Source	Rating
PopMatters	5/10
Prefix	8/10
RapReviews	7.5/10

Welcome to Red Hook Houses is the debut studio album by American hip-hop duo T.H.U.G. Angelz, composed of Wu-Tang affiliate rappers Hell Razah and Shabazz the Disciple. It was released on July 8, 2008 via Babygrande Records. Recorded at Top Of The Building Studios and Duckdown Studios, it was produced by Shroom, Blue Sky Black Death, Bond, Bronze Nazareth, DJ Rated R, Hell Razah, Jordan River Banks, RNS, Shawneci, Smokeshop Productions, Spell and Vanderslice, and features the lone guest appearance from fellow Sunz of Man affiliate 7th Ambassador.

The album's title refers to Red Hook Houses public housing in Brooklyn. 'T.H.U.G.' abbreviation stands for 'Those Humbled Under God'. The album contains a remixed track "Audiobiography" off of Razah's Ladder.

== Track listing ==
No.	Title	Writer(s)	Producer(s)	Length
1.	"Cab Ride (Opening)"	Chron Smith; Tim Schoegje	Shroom	2:23
2.	"Welcome to Red Hook Houses"	Smith; David Collins; Jonas Leopold	Jordan River Banks	3:21
3.	"Jail Saga"	Collins; Eric Vanderslice	Vanderslice	3:39
4.	"The Obituary (E.B.G.G.)"	Smith; Collins; Justin Cross	Bronze Nazareth	4:09
5.	"My Brother's Keeper"	Smith; Collins; J. Bahn	Bond	4:33
6.	"Gang Love"	Smith; Collins; Shawn Z. Raskin	Shawneci	3:30
7.	"South Brooklyn (The Anthem)"	Smith; Collins; Harold Spiva	RNS	3:20
8.	"Audiobiography" (Remix)	Smith; Collins; Ian Taggart; Ryan Maguire	Blue Sky Black Death	4:27
9.	"Apt. 7G (Blacksmiths)"	Smith; Joseph Bishun	Smokeshop Productions	3:18
10.	"The Visit" (featuring 7th Ambassador)	Smith; Collins; Ian Bellido; Schoegje	Shroom	3:45
11.	"Under the Wing"	Smith; Collins; C. Rowsell	DJ Rated R; Hell Razah	4:03
12.	"Confessions of a T.H.U.G. Angel (Closing)"	Collins; A.V. Ringhog	Spell	2:38
13.	"144,000"	Smith; Collins; Schoegje	Shroom	3:07
