= Ze Gonzales =

Brazilian DJ (born 1969)

- Also known as: DJ Zegon
- Born: José Henrique Castanho de Godoy Pinheiro; April 26, 1969 (age 57); São Paulo, Brazil
- Genres: Hip hop; electronic; trap
- Occupations: Producer; musician; DJ
- Years active: 1992–present
- Website: www.djzegon.com

Zé Gonzales (born José Henrique Castanho de Godoy Pinheiro; April 26, 1969), known by his stage name DJ Zegon, is a Brazilian DJ and producer of electronic music and hip-hop.

He started his career in the 1990s as the band DJ for Planet Hemp, one of the top hip-hop acts in Brazil in the 1990s. In the 2000s, he met and began collaborating with Los Angeles based Squeak E. Clean on the N.A.S.A. project. As of 2012, he formed the bass music group Tropkillaz alongside DJ and Producer Andre Laudz.

== Collaborations ==
Zé has collaborated with a number of notable musicians from various genres: Yeah Yeah Yeahs, John Frusciante, M.I.A., Tom Waits
