= Nature Sounds =

American record label

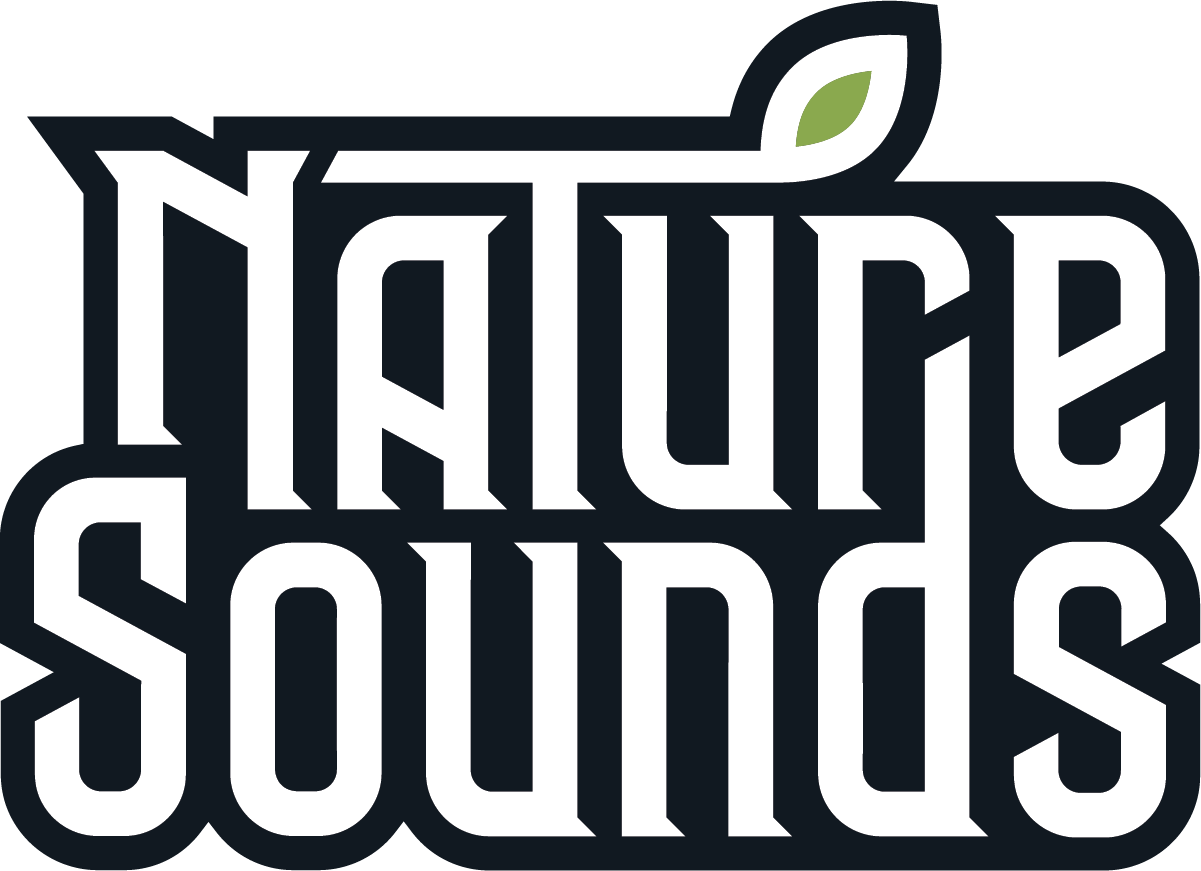
- Founded: 2002
- Founder: Devin Horwitz
- Distributor: Secretly Group
- Genre: Hip-hop, reggae
- Country of origin: United States
- Location: Brooklyn, New York, U.S.
- Official website: naturesoundsmusic.com

Nature Sounds is an American record label based in Brooklyn, New York, specializing in hip-hop and reggae music. The label is independently owned and operated. It was founded by Devin Horwitz in 2003. The label also has multiple releases with subsidiary Green Streets Entertainment.

== History ==
Nature Sounds was founded in 2003 by Devin Horwitz, also known as the producer Dev 1. Since then, the label has featured releases from prominent artists such as Blu, MF Doom, Pete Rock, R.A. The Rugged Man and Immortal Technique, among others.

== Discography ==
Ayatollah

- Now Playing (2006)
- Louder (2008)
- Drum Machine (2008)
- The Quixotic (2010)
- Cocoon (2010)
- Live from the MPC 60 (2010)
- Fingertips (2011)

Big City (Psycho Les, Al Tariq, Problemz)

- The City Never Sleeps (2007)

Blu

- HerFavoriteColo(u)r (2011)
- Good to Be Home (2014)

Black Market Militia

- Black Market Militia (2005)

Chris Lowe

- The Black Life (2004)

Copywrite

- Cruise Control Mixtape Vol. 1 (2005)

DJ Babu

- The Beat Tape Vol. 2 (2002)
- Duck Season Vol. 3 (2003)

Earl "Chinna" Smith

- Dub It! (2004)

Havoc

- The Kush (2007)

Hell Razah

- Renaissance Child (2007)
- Heaven Razah (2010)

Illmind

- Behind the Curtain (2011)

Immortal Technique

- Revolutionary Vol. 1 (2001)
- Revolutionary Vol. 2 (2003)

J Dilla

- Jay Stay Paid (2009)

Masta Killa

- No Said Date (2004)
- Made in Brooklyn (2006)
- Selling My Soul (2012)
- Loyalty Is Royalty (2017)

Mathematics

- The Problem (2005)
- Soul of a Man (2006)
- Mathematics Presents Wu-Tang Clan & Friends Unreleased (2007)

MF Doom

- The Prof. Meets The Super Villain (2002)
- Special Herbs: The Box Set Vol. 0-9 (2006)
- Special Herbs, Vols. 5 & 6 (2003)
- Best of KMD (2004)
- Live from Planet X (2005)

O.C. & A.G.

- Oasis (2010)

Omega One

- The Lo-Fi Chronicles (2005)

Pete Rock

- NY's Finest (2008)

R.A. the Rugged Man

- Die, Rugged Man, Die (2004)
- Legendary Classics Volume 1 (2009)
- Legends Never Die (2013)

Scientist

- Dub 9/11 (2006)

Strong Arm Steady

- Deep Hearted (2007)

Termanology

- Politics as Usual (2008)

Tragedy Khadafi

- Intelligent Hoodlum + Saga of a Hoodlum (reissue) (2007)

Vordul Mega

- The Revolution of Yung Havoks (2004)

Compilations

- Convexed (2003)
- Too Stoned for TV (2005)
- Natural Selection (2006)

== See also ==
- List of record labels
- Underground hip-hop
