= Black Market Militia (album) =

Studio album by the Black Market Militia
- Released: March 22, 2005
- Recorded: 2004–2005
- Studio: Planet 2 Planet Studio's (New York, NY)
- Genre: Hip-hop
- Length: 48:13
- Label: Nature Sounds
- Producer: Ben Varges; BP; Bronze Nazareth; Godz Wrath Productions; J. Rusch; King Solomon; Ron Browz; Squeeze; Subliminal

Singles from Black Market Militia
- 1. "Audubon Ballroom / Thug Nation" Released: March 22, 2005; 2. "Gem Stars (DJ Absolut Remix) / Mayday & The Renaissance" Released: December 13, 2005

Professional ratings
Review scores
Source	Rating
AllHipHop	3.5/5 stars
AllMusic	3/5 stars
laut.de	3/5 stars
RapReviews	7/10

Black Market Militia is the only studio album by American five-piece hip-hop supergroup the Black Market Militia. It was released on March 22, 2005, through Nature Sounds. Recording sessions took place at Planet 2 Planet Studio's in New York City. Production was handled by Godz Wrath, Ben Varges, Bronze Nazareth, BP, J. Rusch, King Solomon, Ron Browz, Squeeze and Subliminal, with Dreddy Kruger serving as co-producer. It features guest appearances from Dead Prez, Abiodun Oyewole and Oscar Brown.

== Track listing ==
No.	Title	Producer(s)	Length
1.	"Intro Children of Children" (featuring Oscar Brown Jr.)	Bronze Nazareth; Dreddy Kruger (co.)	1:02
2.	"Thug Nation"	Godz Wrath	3:51
3.	"Mayday!"	Ben Varges; Dreddy Kruger (co.)	3:37
4.	"Audobon Ballroom" (featuring dead prez)	Squeeze; Dreddy Kruger (co.)	4:06
5.	"The Struggle"	BP	4:06
6.	"Hood Lullabye"	Godz Wrath; Dreddy Kruger (co.)	2:37
7.	"Gem Star's"	King Solomon	3:51
8.	"Righteous Talk"	Bronze Nazareth; Dreddy Kruger (co.)	2:55
9.	"The Final Call" (featuring Abiodun Oyewole)	Subliminal	3:22
10.	"Dead Street Scrolls"	Godz Wrath	4:11
11.	"Paintbrush"	Ron Browz	2:48
12.	"Black Market"	Godz Wrath	4:51
13.	"The Breath of Life"	Ben Varges	3:13
14.	"Think Market"	J. Rusch	3:43
Total length:			48:13

Notes

- Track 1 contains a poem by Oscar Brown Jr. taken from Def Poetry Jam.
- Track 4 contains vocals by Malcolm X taken from The Collected Speeches 1960-1965.

== Personnel ==
- Walter "Killah Priest" Reed – vocals (tracks: 2, 4–7, 9–14), co-executive producer
- Percy "Tragedy Khadafi" Chapman – vocals (tracks: 2–5, 7, 9–14), co-executive producer
- William Cooper – vocals (tracks: 2, 5, 7, 12, 14)
- Chron "Hell Razah" Smith – vocals (tracks: 3, 6, 10–12)
- Timothy "Timbo King" Drayton – vocals (tracks: 2, 6, 8)
- Oscar Brown, Jr. – vocals (track 1)
- Lavonne "M-1" Alford – vocals (track 4)
- Clayton "stic.man" Gavin – vocals (track 4)
- Savoy – additional vocals (track 4)
- Charles "Abiodun Oyewole" Davis – vocals (track 9)
- Justin "Bronze Nazareth" Cross – producer (tracks: 1, 8)
- Godz Wrath Productions – producers (tracks: 2, 6, 10, 12)
- Benjamin Vargas – producer (tracks: 3, 13)
- Squeeze – producer (track 4)
- Brad Perlow – producer (track 5)
- Solomon Oyeyemi – producer (track 7)
- Subliminal – producer (track 9)
- Rondell "Ron Browz" Turner – producer (track 11)
- J. Rusch – producer (track 14)
- James "Dreddy Kruger" Dockery – co-producer (tracks: 1, 3, 4, 6, 8), arranger, sequencing, A&R
- Chris Conway – mixing
- Larry Kerr – engineering
- Michael Sarsfield – mastering
- Devin Horwitz – executive producer
- Gary Hertzan – executive producer
- Mitchell Serbes – executive producer
- Nubian Image – cover artwork, layout
