= Black Market Militia =

American rap group

- Origin: New York City, U.S.
- Genres: Hip hop
- Label: Performance Records
- Members: Killah Priest; Timbo King; Hell Razah; Tragedy Khadafi; William Cooper

Black Market Militia is a rap group composed of Killah Priest, Timbo King, Hell Razah, Tragedy Khadafi and William Cooper. They released their first album Black Market Militia in 2005. They had previously released two underground mixtapes, The Black Market Vol. 1 and Vol. 2: Dead Street Scrolls.

== Discography ==
=== Albums ===
- Black Market Militia (2005)

=== Mixtapes ===
- 2002: The Black Market Vol. 1
- 2003: Vol. 2: Dead Street Scrolls
- 2004: Vol. 3: Underground Economy
