= Timbo King =

- Born: Timothy Drayton; March 26, 1973 (age 53); Brooklyn, New York City, U.S.
- Genres: Hip hop
- Occupations: Rapper; producer
- Labels: Fortknox; Scotti Bros.

Timbo King (born Timothy Drayton March 26, 1973 in Bushwick, Brooklyn, New York) is a Wu-Tang Clan affiliate MC, leader and founding member of Royal Fam and member of Black Market Militia and Maccabeez.

In 1993, he released an EP titled United We Slam with producer Spark 950. In 90's, he recorded the Royal Fam debut album Black Castle and the second Royal Fam album Yesterday, Today, Iz Tomorrow.

In 2005, he formed the group 56 Platoon along with some other ex-Royal Fam members and released the Black Market Militia album with Killah Priest, Hell Razah, Tragedy Khadafy and William Cooper.

He released the debut solo album, From Babylon to Timbuk2, in 2011 largely produced by Bronze Nazareth.

Timbo King can be seen in the Forest Whitaker film Ghost Dog: The Way of the Samurai.

In 2013, he founded "The Kraftsmen", a hip-hop and rock band with French artists, Soulstreet and Adikson.

In 2016, he released a debut video and single as Mineral Writes, a group he founded with musician Gary Llama.

Also in 2016, he began a mixtape series with Mic Journey and Karrmega called "The Beehive" under the production company Instastar, featuring songs with Cappadonna, iNTeLL, Mic Journey, Killah Priest, Young Dirty Bastard, Solomon Childs, Raaddrr Van and more.

He is related to Flavor Flav.

== Solo & Collaborative Albums ==
- Timbo King & Spark 950 - United We Slam EP (1993)
- Royal Fam - Black Castle (1996)
- Royal Fam - Yesterday, Today, Iz Tomorrow (2000)
- Black Market Militia - Black Market Militia (2005)
- Maccabeez - The Spooks Who Kicked Down Tha Doorz (2005)
- Timbo King - From Babylon to Timbuk2 (2011)
- The Kraftsmen - Les Artisans EP (2013)
- Timbo King, Xkwisit & Ab The Audicrat - T.I.M. (Thoughts In Motion) EP (2020)
- Timbo King & Tek (TNT) - Wu Camp (2022)
- Timbo King & Shaka Amazulu The 7th - VerbaTIM (2023)
- Timbo King - TMB KNG (2023)
- Timbo King & Krimewave - Buried Treasures (2024)
- Timbo King, Ras Ceylon & Dawit Justice - Jacket Fulla Medalz (2024)
