= Wu-Tang Forever: The Final Chamber =

2025 concert tour by Wu-Tang Clan

- Tour by Wu-Tang Clan
- Promotional poster
- Location: North America
- Start date: June 6, 2025
- End date: October 4, 2026
- Legs: 4
- No. of shows: 36

Wu-Tang Clan concert chronology
- The Saga Continues...The Las Vegas Residency (2024); Wu-Tang Forever: The Final Chamber (2025)

Wu-Tang Forever: The Final Chamber is the ongoing farewell concert tour by American hip-hop collective Wu-Tang Clan. It began on June 6, 2025, in Baltimore, Maryland, and concludes in late 2026, in Yokohama, Japan, comprising 36 dates.

The tour features Wu-Tang's surviving members—RZA, GZA, Raekwon, Ghostface Killah, Method Man, Inspectah Deck, U-God, Masta Killa, and Cappadonna—along with Ol' Dirty Bastard's son, Young Dirty Bastard and Mathematics. The opening act on the first leg of the North American tour was American hip-hop superduo Run the Jewels, while Bone Thugs-n-Harmony serve as the opener for the second leg, currently in progress.

== Background ==
On February 24, 2025, the tour was announced. Tickets for general onsale was held on February 28.

RZA said in a press statement, "This is a special moment for me and all my Wu brothers to run around the globe together one more time and spread the Wu swag, music, and culture. Most importantly, to touch our fans and those who have supported us throughout the years." He added that they were playing previously unheard songs for fans and worked with their production team to design "a Wu-Tang show unlike anything you've ever seen". He explained in a New York Times interview that the tour was part of their five-year plan, alongside a documentary series, dramatized mini-series, several individual biographies, and a Las Vegas residency.

Method Man, Raekwon, and Cappadonna did not show in Brisbane Australia, disappointing local fans. Sound issues presented also.

The clan also took the opportunity to advertise upcoming projects during the set, never missing an opportunity with a captive audience.

== Set list ==
The following set list is from their first show in Baltimore, Maryland. It is not intended to represent all dates throughout the tour.

Set 1

1. "Bring da Ruckus"
2. "Clan in da Front"
3. "Da Mystery of Chessboxin'"
4. "Sunlight"
5. "Wu-Tang Clan Ain't Nuthing ta F' Wit"
6. "Method Man"
7. "Shame on a Nigga"
8. "Protect Ya Neck"

Set 2

1. "The Way We Were" (with Blue Raspberry)
2. "Can It Be All So Simple" (with Blue Raspberry)
3. "Rainy Dayz"
4. "Hollow Bones"
5. "Take It Back"
6. "Daytona 500"
7. "'97 Mentality"
8. "Above the Clouds" (Gang Starr cover)
9. "Incarcerated Scarfaces"
10. "Ice Cream"
11. "Release Yo' Delf" (with Blue Raspberry)
12. "Bring the Pain"
13. "All I Need" (with Blue Raspberry)

Set 3

1. "Liquid Swords"
2. "Duel of the Iron Mic"
3. "Severe Punishment"
4. "4th Chamber"
5. "Smells Like Teen Spirit"
6. "No Said Date"
7. "Run" (Cappadonna song)
8. "Run" (Ghostface Killah song)
9. "Roar of the Lion (The Lion's Pit)"
10. "Impossible"
11. "Tearz"

Set 4

1. "Reunited"
2. "For Heavens Sake"
3. "Shimmy Shimmy Ya"
4. "Brooklyn Zoo"
5. "Got Your Money"
6. "C.R.E.A.M."
7. "Triumph"
8. "Family Reunion"

=== Guest performers ===
- At the Philadelphia show, Lauryn Hill, Freeway, and LL Cool J joined the show as guest performers.

== Tour dates ==
| Date | City | Country | Venue | Opening act(s) |
Leg 1: North America (with Run The Jewels)
| June 6, 2025 | Baltimore | United States | CFG Bank Arena | Run the Jewels |
| June 7, 2025 | Raleigh | United States | Lenovo Center | Run the Jewels |
| June 10, 2025 | Tampa | United States | Amalie Arena | Run the Jewels |
| June 11, 2025 | Atlanta | United States | State Farm Arena | Run the Jewels |
| June 13, 2025 | Fort Worth | United States | Dickies Arena | Run the Jewels |
| June 14, 2025 | Houston | United States | Toyota Center | Run the Jewels |
| June 15, 2025 | Austin | United States | Moody Center | Run the Jewels |
| June 16, 2025 | Tulsa | United States | BOK Center | Run the Jewels |
| June 18, 2025 | Phoenix | United States | PHX Arena | Run the Jewels |
| June 20, 2025 | Ontario | United States | Toyota Arena | Run the Jewels |
| June 21, 2025 | San Diego | United States | Pechanga Arena | Run the Jewels |
| June 22, 2025 | Los Angeles | United States | Crypto.com Arena | Run the Jewels |
| June 24, 2025 | San Francisco | United States | Chase Center | Run the Jewels |
| June 26, 2025 | Sacramento | United States | Golden 1 Center | Run the Jewels |
| June 28, 2025 | Seattle | United States | Climate Pledge Arena | Run the Jewels |
| June 30, 2025 | Vancouver | Canada | Rogers Arena | Run the Jewels |
| July 1, 2025 | Portland | United States | Moda Center | Run the Jewels |
| July 4, 2025 | Greenwood Village | United States | Fiddler's Green Amphitheatre | Run the Jewels |
| July 7, 2025 | Chicago | United States | United Center | Run the Jewels |
| July 8, 2025 | Detroit | United States | Little Caesars Arena | Run the Jewels |
| July 9, 2025 | Columbus | United States | Nationwide Arena | Run the Jewels |
| July 11, 2025 | Boston | United States | TD Garden | Run the Jewels |
| July 13, 2025 | Laval | Canada | Place Bell | Run the Jewels |
| July 14, 2025 | Toronto | Canada | Scotiabank Arena | Run the Jewels |
| July 16, 2025 | New York | United States | Madison Square Garden | Run the Jewels |
| July 17, 2025 | Newark | United States | Prudential Center | Run the Jewels |
| July 18, 2025 | Philadelphia | United States | Wells Fargo Center | Run the Jewels |
| September 11, 2025 | Holmdel | United States | PNC Bank Arts Center | Bone Thugs-N-Harmony |
Leg 2: Europe
| March 2, 2026 | Amsterdam | Netherlands | Ziggo Dome | - |
| March 11, 2026 | Paris | France | Accor Arena | - |
| March 12, 2026 | Zurich | Switzerland | Hallenstadion | - |
| March 15, 2026 | Łódź | Poland | Atlas Arena | - |
| March 17, 2026 | London | United Kingdom | The O2 Arena | |
| March 19, 2026 | Manchester | United Kingdom | Co-op Live | |
Leg 3: Oceania
| March 25, 2026 | Brisbane | Australia | Brisbane Entertainment Centre | - |
| March 27, 2026 | Melbourne | Australia | Rod Laver Arena | - |
| March 28, 2026 | Sydney | Australia | Qudos Arena | - |
Leg 4: Japan
| May 24, 2026 | Yokohama | Japan | K-Arena Yokohama | |
Leg 5: North America (with Bone Thugs-n-Harmony)
| August 27, 2026 | Darien Center | United States | Darien Lake Performing Arts Center at Six Flags Darien Lake | |
| August 28, 2026 | Atlantic City | United States | Hard Rock Live at Mark G. Etess Arena | |
| August 29, 2026 | Hartford | United States | The Meadows Music Theatre | |
| September 1, 2026 | Shakopee | United States | Mystic Lake Amphitheater | |
| September 2, 2026 | Riverside | United States | Morton Amphitheater | |
| September 4, 2026 | Tinley Park | United States | Credit Union 1 Amphitheatre | |
| September 5, 2026 | Cincinnati | United States | Riverbend Music Center | |
| September 6, 2026 | Clarkston | United States | Pine Knob Music Theatre | |
| September 8, 2026 | Toronto | Canada | RBC Amphitheatre | |
| September 9, 2026 | Cuyahoga Falls | United States | Blossom Music Center | |
| September 11, 2026 | Holmdel | United States | PNC Bank Arts Center | |
| September 12, 2026 | Mansfield | United States | Xfinity Center | |
| September 13, 2026 | Wantagh | United States | Northwell at Jones Beach Theater | |
| September 15, 2026 | Bristow | United States | Jiffy Lube Live | |
| September 16, 2026 | Virginia Beach | United States | Veterans United Home Loans Amphitheater | |
| September 18, 2026 | Charlotte | United States | Truliant Amphitheater | |
| September 19, 2026 | Birmingham | United States | Coca-Cola Amphitheater | |
| September 20, 2026 (Note: Part of Shaky Knees Festival.) | Atlanta | United States | Centennial Olympic Park | |
| September 22, 2026 | Orlando | United States | Kia Center | |
| September 23, 2026 | West Palm Beach | United States | iTHINK Financial Amphitheatre | |
| September 24, 2026 | Tampa | United States | MidFlorida Credit Union Amphitheatre | |
| September 26, 2026 | Thackerville | United States | Lucas Oil Live | |
| September 28, 2026 | Albuquerque | United States | First Financial Credit Union Amphitheater | |
| September 29, 2026 | West Valley City | United States | Utah First Credit Union Amphitheatre | |
| October 1, 2026 | Highland | United States | Yaamava' Resort & Casino | |
| October 2, 2026 (Note: Part of Aftershock Festival.) | Sacramento | United States | Discovery Park | |
| October 3, 2026 | Paradise | United States | T-Mobile Arena | |
| October 4, 2026 | Phoenix | United States | Talking Stick Resort Amphitheatre | |
