= Ol' Dirty Bastard discography =

Below shows the discography for the American rapper and Wu-Tang Clan member, Ol' Dirty Bastard.

== Albums ==
=== Studio albums ===
List of studio albums, with selected chart positions, sales figures and certifications
Title	Details	Peak chart positions						Certifications
Title	Details	US	US R&B /HH	CAN	GER	NLD	UK	Certifications
Return to the 36 Chambers: The Dirty Version	Released: March 28, 1995; Label: Elektra	7	2	48	—	—	101	RIAA: Platinum; BPI: Silver
Nigga Please	Released: September 14, 1999; Label: Elektra	10	2	33	59	64	104	RIAA: Gold; MC: Gold
A Son Unique	Released: June 21, 2005; Label: Dame Dash/Universal Music/Def Jam	—	—	—	—	—	—	

=== Live albums ===
Title	Release date
Free to Be Dirty! Live	August 30, 2005

=== Compilation albums ===
Title	Details	Chart positions		
Title	Details	US	US R&B	CAN
The Dirty Story: The Best of Ol' Dirty Bastard	Released: September 18, 2001; Label: Elektra	—	—	—
The Trials and Tribulations of Russell Jones	Released: March 19, 2002; Label: D3/Riviera Entertainment	33	6	86
The Definitive Ol' Dirty Bastard Story	Released: June 21, 2005; Label: Elektra	—	—	—
In Memory Of... Vol. 3	Released: July 9, 2007; Label: 101 Distribution	—	—	—
The Last Tape (Greatest Hits)	Released: May 10, 2011; Label: Wu Music Group	—	—	—

=== Mixtapes ===
Title	Mixtape details	Chart positions			
Title	Mixtape details	US	US R&B /HH	FRA	SWI
Osirus	Released: January 4, 2005; Label: Sure Shot Recordings	157	47	186	92

== Extended plays ==
Year	Title
1996	O.D.B.E.P.: Released: 1996; Label: Elektra

== Singles ==
Title	Year	Peak chart positions							Certifications	Album
Title	Year	US	US R&B /HH	US Rap	FRA	NLD	SCO	UK	Certifications	Album
"Brooklyn Zoo"	1995	54	40	5	—	—	—	—		Return to the 36 Chambers: The Dirty Version
"Shimmy Shimmy Ya"	1995	62	47	9	—	—	—	—	BPI: Silver	Return to the 36 Chambers: The Dirty Version
"Got Your Money" (featuring Kelis)	1999	33	19	6	82	96	18	11	BPI: Gold	Nigga Please

== Other charted songs ==
List of songs, with selected chart positions, showing year released and album name
Title	Year	Peak chart positions				Certifications	Album
Title	Year	US	US R&B/ HH	CAN	WW	Certifications	Album
"Forgiveless" (SZA featuring Ol' Dirty Bastard)	2022	76	35	99	164	RIAA: Gold	SOS

== Guest appearances ==
bold & underlined signifies a music video.

- 1994 "Show & Prove" (with a whole host of OGs from the Big Daddy Kane album Daddy's Home)
- 1995 "Ol' Dirty's Back" ([with 12 O'Clock from Tales from the Hood (soundtrack)]
- 1995 "Nuttin' but Flavor" (it's a Funkmaster Flex 12")
- 1995 "North Star (Jewels)" (from the Raekwon album Only Built 4 Cuban Linx...)
- 1995 "Duel of the Iron Mic" (from the GZA album Liquid Swords)
- 1995 "Fantasy (Remix)" (legendary 12" by Mariah Carey
- 1996 "Woo-Hah!! Got You All in Check (The World Wide Remix)" [12"by Busta Rhymes]
- 1996 "Flashlight (The GrooveMasters' Mix)" [from the George Clinton album Greatest Funkin' Hits]
- 1997 "Next to You" (from the Peaches album Who I Am)
- 1997 Whatever (Tumbling Dice Radio Remix)" [12" by En Vogue]
- 1997 "Strictly Hip-Hop" (from the Afro Jazz album Afrocalypse)
- 1997 "Say Nothin' (Remix)" [from the Omar Lye-Fook album This Is Not a Love Song]
- 1997 "Dirty the Moocher" (Hoodlum Soundtrack) [technically a Wu-Tang song but you HAVE to KNOW It!!!!]
- 1997 "Hip Hop Drunkies" (from Tha Alkaholiks album Likwidation)
- 1997 "Fix (Main Mix)" [12" by Blackstreet]
- 1998 "If You Don't Know" (from the Killah Priest album Heavy Mental)
- 1998 "Shining Star" (from the Sunz of Man album The Last Shall Be First)
- 1998 "Drug-Free" (from the Deadly Venoms album Antidote)
- 1998 "Nowhere to Run" (with Ozzy Osbourne, DMX, The Crystal Method and Fuzzbubble from Chef Aid: The South Park Album)
- 1998 "The Park" [with Coolio from Slam (soundtrack)]
- 1998 "Who Rock This" [with Mystikal from I Got the Hook-Up (soundtrack)]
- 1998 "So Good (So Dirty Remix)" [with La the Darkman from the Davina B-Side "Come Over to My Place"]
- 1998 "Ghetto Supastar (That Is What You Are)" [with Pras and Mya from Bulworth: The Soundtrack]
- 1998 "Kiss of a Black Widow" (from the RZA album Bobby Digital In Stereo)
- 1998 "For the Money" (with Buckshot from the Mack 10 album The Recipe)
- 1999 "'96 Recreation (Demo)" [from the Wu-Chronicles compilation album]
- 1999 "Prepare for the Buddha Monk" (from the Popa Wu album Visions of the 10th Chamber)
- 1999 "Crash Your Crew" (from the GZA album Beneath the Surface)
- 1999 ""Bitches" (from the Insane Clown Posse album The Amazing Jeckel Brothers)
- 2000 "Violence" (from the Cam'ron album S.D.E.)
- 2000 "Wreck (Mankind Theme) [with Kool Keith from WWF Aggression]
- 2001 "Black Widow Pt. 2" (from the RZA album Digital Bullet)
- 2001 "Last Call" (from the album Bully)
- 2001 "Sussudio" (from the album Urban Renewal)
- 2002 "Doe Rae Wu" (from the Wu-Tang Killa Beez album The Sting)
- 2003 "Some Girls (Dance With Women)" (bonus remix of the first single off the JC Chasez album Schizophrenic... plus he's Dirt McGirt)
- 2003 "Pop Shit" (as Dirt McGirt from The Neptunes album The Neptunes Present... Clones)
- 2003 "We Pop" (from the RZA album Birth of a Prince)
- 2003 "When You Hear That" (with Peedi Crack and Beanie Sigel from the State Property album Chain Gang Vol. 2)
- 2004 "Keep the Receipt" (as Dirt McGirt from the Kanye West mixtape Kon the Louis Vuitton Don )
- 2004 "Dirty" (from the Slum Village album Detroit Deli (A Taste of Detroit))
- 2004 "Thirsty" (from Blade Trinity OST)
- 2004 "Dirty and Thirsty" (from the Melbeatz album Rapper's Delight)
- 2004 "Old Man" (as Dirt McGirt from the Masta Killa album No Said Date)
- 2004 "This is Not" (from Mr R album Politikment Inccorekt)
- 2004 "Everytime" (as Dirt McGirt from the Jon B. album Stronger Everyday)
- 2005 "Blah-Blah-Blah" (from the Brooke Valentine album Chain Letter)
- 2005 "Break That" (from the Mathematics album The Problem)
- 2005 "Specially Trained Ninja" (from the Zu Ninjaz album Now Justice)
- 2005 "Where's Your Money?" (single by Busta Rhymes)
- 2006 "Build Me Up" (from the Rhymefest album Blue Collar)
- 2006 "Dirty Mef" (from the Method Man album 4:21... The Day After)
- 2007 "Toxic" (Mark Ronson remix of the Britney classic from his album Version)
- 2009 "Strange Enough" (on the collaboration-project "N.A.S.A., The Spirit of Apollo")
- 2009 "Coochie" (on the collaboration-project "Blakroc, Blakroc")
- 2010 "Dirts the Boogie" (from the Killa Beez album Pollen: the Swarm)
- 2011 "Not For Télévision Remix 2011" (from the Rockin' Squat album US Alien Chapter one)
- 2020 "Slow Flow" (from the Busta Rhymes album Extinction Level Event 2: The Wrath of God)
- 2022 "Forgiveless" (from the SZA album SOS)

== Music videos ==
Album	Artist	Year	Song
Return to the 36 Chambers	O.D.B.	1995	Shimmy Shimmy Ya
Return to the 36 Chambers	O.D.B.	1995	Brooklyn Zu
Return to the 36 Chambers	O.D.B.	1995	Shimmy Shimmy Ya (Studio Ton Remix)
Bulworth O.S.T.	Mya, Pras	1998	Ghetto Supastar
Nigga Please	O.D.B., Kelis	1999	Got Your Money
No Said Date	Masta Killa	2004	Old Man
