= Tical (album) =

Studio album by Method Man
- Released: November 15, 1994
- Studios: 36 Chambers Records, Staten Island; Chung King, Manhattan; Firehouse Studios, Manhattan; Platinum Island, Manhattan
- Genre: East Coast hip-hop
- Length: 43:49
- Labels: Wu-Tang; Def Jam
- Producer: RZA

Method Man chronology
Tical (1994)	Tical 2000: Judgement Day (1998)

Wu-Tang Clan solo chronology
Words from the Genius (1991)	Tical (1994)	Return to the 36 Chambers: The Dirty Version (1995)

Singles from Tical
- 1. "Bring the Pain" Released: October 25, 1994; 2. "Release Yo' Delf" Released: January 11, 1995; 3. "I'll Be There for You / You're All I Need to Get By" Released: April 25, 1995

Tical is the debut studio album by American rapper and Wu-Tang Clan member Method Man. It was released November 15, 1994, by Def Jam Recordings. It was the first Wu-Tang solo album released after the group's debut, Enter the Wu-Tang (36 Chambers). Similar to all first generation solo Wu-Tang projects, Tical was mainly produced by group member RZA, who provided a dark, murky and rugged sound. The album features guest appearances from RZA, Raekwon, Inspectah Deck, as well as several affiliates, who would later appear on future group projects. In 2017, Method Man revealed on the Viceland talk show Desus & Mero that the album's title is an acronym for "taking into consideration all lives."

Tical was a critical and commercial success, reaching number four on the US Billboard 200, and number one on the Top R&B/Hip Hop Albums. On January 18, 1995, the album was certified gold by the Recording Industry Association of America (RIAA), and on July 13, 1995, the record was certified platinum for the shipment of one million copies in the United States. The success for the album was driven by two singles: "Bring the Pain" and "I'll Be There for You / You're All I Need to Get By".

== Background ==
In 1991, rapper GZA assisted Method Man in shopping him to label executives at Cold Chillin' Records. Though this would turn out to be unsuccessful, he formed the Wu-Tang Clan with his cousins RZA and Ol' Dirty Bastard, and Method Man was included in the group. Method Man went on to perform on eight of the twelve tracks on the group's acclaimed 1993 debut album, Enter the Wu-Tang (36 Chambers), and even had a solo song entitled "Method Man". That song as well as "C.R.E.A.M.", on which he performed the chorus line, reached #69 and #60 respectively on the Billboard Hot 100. These two songs had higher chart positions than any other tracks on the album, and thus caused much anticipation for Method Man's solo career. At the time of Wu-Tang Clan's debut album, Method Man's rhymes, charisma, and smooth, deep voice made him the group's most visible, popular member.

With the exception of "Sub Crazy" and "P.L.O. Style", which were co-produced by 4th Disciple and Method Man respectively, group member RZA produced Tical in its entirety – leading Jason Birchmeier of Allmusic to refer to the album as "a two-man show". As with the rest of the first round of Wu-Tang albums, RZA would recreate the distinct "Shaolin" sound while tailoring it to the featured rapper. On Tical, his production was especially gritty, dark and murky, complementing both Method Man's distinctly smooth-yet-rugged voice and his raps of cannabis smoking, project love, and traditional hardcore hip-hop lyricism. During this time period of the Wu-Tang Clan, RZA was the sole provider of beats for all of its members, whom he would then have battle over the rights to record over them. This competitive approach to quality control would result in Tical's "Meth vs. Chef", a recorded battle between Method Man and Raekwon. "Meth vs. Chef" was recorded in 1993 before RZA's 36 Chambers Studios was flooded, destroying reportedly fifteen beats per Wu-Tang Clan rapper. Many of the beats for Tical would be hastily recreated, and mixed.

== Singles ==
In 1994, the lead single "Bring the Pain" (backed with "P.L.O. Style") was released. "Bring the Pain" was a RZA-produced track with an understated but funky groove, capped with the ragga vocals of Booster. The single would reach number 45 on the Billboard Hot 100, and number 1 on the Hot Dance chart. The follow-up single, 1995's "Release Yo' Delf", was a more upbeat track, and featured Wu-affiliate Blue Raspberry singing an interpolation of Gloria Gaynor's disco anthem, "I Will Survive". "Release Yo' Delf" reached number 98 on the Hot 100, failing to match the success of "Bring The Pain", but fared better in the UK, peaking at number 45 on the Official Singles Chart. Tical remains the only Method Man album with two singles reaching the Billboard Hot 100.

To continue the album's promotion, "All I Need" was remixed and released as a single in the summer of 1995 as "I'll Be There for You/You're All I Need to Get By". There are two remixes of this song: "Razor Sharp Mix" by the RZA, and the remix by Puff Daddy, both featuring Mary J. Blige. RZA's version proved to be more successful, with its accompanying music video aiding the song to reach number 3 on the Billboard Hot 100, and number one on the Hot Rap, Dance and R&B charts. "Razor Sharp Mix" also won the two a Grammy Award for Best Rap Performance by a Duo or Group in 1996.

== Critical reception ==
=== Initial reaction ===
Professional ratings
Initial reviews (in 1994/1995)
Review scores
Source	Rating
Christgau's Consumer Guide	(1-star Honorable Mention)
Entertainment Weekly	B
Music Week	5/5 stars
NME	8/10
Select	5/5
The Source	4/5 stars

Tical was well received by music critics. Tracy E. Hopkins from Entertainment Weekly stated: "Method Man proves to be one of rap's most formidable players. On his solo outing, Tical, the Wu-Tang Clan's standout MC wages lyrical warfare. His gripping rhymes creep out of the darkness and take listeners hostage". Melody Maker wrote that "Meth comes correct with this beamed-down-from-Planet-Mars making music that's way darker and more disorienting than was previously thought possible". NME commented: "The East coast hip-hop renaissance continues apace... supremely laid-back, mooching along at a bass-weighted amble, whether it's framing the monogamous lover's lament of "All I Need" or the 'I Will Survive' hook of "Release Yo Self".

Rolling Stone praised the album's singles, but stated: "It's with its heaviest numbers that Tical delivers the primo goods". Writing for The Source, Mitchell Pierce described the album's production as "dark bass and distorted wails that sound like someone is being hacked to death". Pierce concluded that "Tical combines verbal terrorism, tenebrous grooves and home-demo lunacy to produce a gritty production". Michael A. Gonzales from Vibe described Tical as "incredible", and further stated that "the production wizardry and vocal complexity build with each listen."

=== Retrospect ===
Professional ratings
Retrospective reviews (after 1994/1995)
Review scores
Source	Rating
AllMusic	4.5/5 stars
Melody Maker	4/5 stars
Pitchfork	8.4/10
The Rolling Stone Album Guide	3.5/5 stars
Spin Alternative Record Guide	6/10

Although Tical failed to achieve the critical success of several other Wu-Tang solo albums of its era, such as Only Built 4 Cuban Linx... and Liquid Swords, it has acquired a fair amount of acclaim over the years from various music writers and publications. In 1996, Select ranked it number 28 on their 100 Best Albums of the 90s list, and in 1999, Ego Trip ranked it number 12 on their list of the greatest hip-hop albums released in 1994.

In a later review for Tical, Jason Birchmeier from AllMusic praised Method Man's charisma and RZA's production and stated, "Tical strictly spotlights the group's two stars and does so with refreshingly straightforward flair. There's none of the epic overreaching that mars so many rap albums of the era; rather, there's just over a dozen tracks here, and they're filled to the brim with rhymes and beats and little else; no pop-crossover concessions, nor any heady experimentation for the sake of experimentation. Just good ol'-fashioned hip-hop, albeit with a dark, deranged twist". In 2005, Robert Dimery included Tical on his list of 1001 Albums You Must Hear Before You Die.

=== Accolades ===
- (*) signifies unordered lists

Publication	Country	Accolade	Year	Rank
Ego Trip	United States	Hip Hop's 25 Greatest Albums by Year 1980–1998	1999	12
Muzik	United Kingdom	Albums of the Year	1994	11
NME	United Kingdom	Albums of the Year	1995	40
Pop	Sweden	Albums of the Year	1994	3
Q	United Kingdom	Albums of the Year	1994	*
Q	United Kingdom	50 Heaviest Albums of All Time	2001	*
Robert Dimery	United States	1001 Albums You Must Hear Before You Die	2005	*
Rock de Lux	Spain	Albums of the Year	1994	29
Select	United Kingdom	The 100 Best Albums of the 90s	1999	28
Select	United Kingdom	Albums of the Year	1996	18

== Commercial performance ==
Tical debuted at number four on the US Billboard 200 chart and number one on the US Top R&B/Hip-Hop Albums chart, becoming his first US top-ten album and his first number one on the latter. On July 13, 1995, the album was certified platinum by the Recording Industry Association of America (RIAA) for sales of over one million copies. As of October 2009, the album has 1,613,000 copies in the United States.

== Track listing ==
All tracks produced by RZA, except where noted.

Tical track listing
No.	Title	Writer(s)	Producer(s)	Length
1.	"Tical"	Clifford Smith, Jr.; Robert Diggs		3:57
2.	"Biscuits"	Smith, Jr.; Diggs		2:50
3.	"Bring the Pain"	Smith, Jr.; Diggs; Carlton Ridenhour; Gary Rinaldo; James Boxley III		3:10
4.	"All I Need"	Smith, Jr.; Diggs		3:16
5.	"What the Blood Clot"	Smith, Jr.; Diggs		3:25
6.	"Meth vs. Chef" (featuring Raekwon)	Smith, Jr.; Corey Woods; Diggs		3:36
7.	"Sub Crazy"	Smith, Jr.; Diggs; Selwyn Bougard	RZA; 4th Disciple	2:14
8.	"Release Yo' Delf" (featuring Blue Raspberry)	Smith, Jr.; Candi Lindsey; Diggs; Frederick Perren; Dino Fekaris		4:15
9.	"P.L.O. Style" (featuring Carlton Fisk)	Smith, Jr.; Carlton Fisk; Diggs	RZA; Method Man	2:36
10.	"I Get My Thang in Action"	Smith, Jr.; Diggs		3:46
11.	"Mr. Sandman" (featuring RZA, Inspectah Deck, Street Life, Carlton Fisk, and Blue Raspberry)	Smith, Jr.; Diggs; Jason Hunter; Patrick Charles; Fisk; Lindsey		3:38
12.	"Stimulation"	Smith, Jr.; Diggs		3:46
13.	"Method Man (Remix)"	Wu-Tang Clan		3:16
Total length:				43:45

European bonus track
No.	Title	Writer(s)	Producer(s)	Length
14.	"I'll Be There for You / You're All I Need to Get By" (featuring Mary J. Blige)	Smith, Jr.; Diggs; Nickolas Ashford; Valerie Simpson	RZA	5:08
Total length:				48:53

International bonus tracks
No.	Title	Writer(s)	Producer(s)	Length
14.	"Bring the Pain (Remix)"	Smith, Jr.; Diggs	RZA; Carlos Bess	3:26
15.	"Release Yo' Delf (Prodigy Remix)" (featuring The Prodigy)	Smith, Jr.	RZA; Neil McLellan; Liam Howlett; Keith Flint	5:55
Total length:				53:06

Deluxe Edition bonus tracks
No.	Title	Writer(s)	Producer(s)	Length
1.	"Release Yo' Delf (Prodigy Remix)" (featuring The Prodigy)	Smith, Jr.	RZA; Neil Mc Lellan; Liam Howlett; Keith Flint	5:55
2.	"Release Yo' Delf (New Blood Mix)" (featuring Blue Raspberry)	Smith, Jr.; Diggs; Perren; Fekaris	RZA; New Blood	5:22
3.	"I'll Be There for You/You're All I Need to Get By" (featuring Mary J. Blige)	Smith, Jr.; Diggs; Ashford; Simpson	RZA	3:44
4.	"I'll Be There for You/You're All I Need to Get By" (Razor Sharp Mix Instrumental)		RZA	3:45
5.	"I'll Be There for You/You're All I Need to Get By" (Puff Daddy Mix) (featuring Mary J. Blige)	Smith, Jr.; Diggs; Ashford; Simpson; Carl Edward Thompson, Jr.; Christopher Wallace; Sean Combs; Richard Martin Lloyd Walters	RZA; Diddy	5:09
6.	"I'll Be There for You/You're All I Need to Get By" (Puff Daddy Mix Instrumental)		RZA; Diddy	5:05
7.	"I'll Be There for You/You're All I Need to Get By" (Soul Inside Edit) (featuring Mary J. Blige)	Smith, Jr.; Diggs; Ashford; Simpson; Wallace; Combs; Thomas, Jr.	RZA; Dodge	4:15
8.	"I'll Be There for You/You're All I Need to Get By" (Keep It Tight Mix) (featuring Mary J. Blige)	Smith, Jr.; Diggs; Ashford; Simpson	RZA; Dodge	4:35
9.	"Bring the Pain" (Chemical Brothers Remix)	Smith, Jr.; Diggs	RZA; The Chemical Brothers	5:59
10.	"Bring the Pain" (Carlos Bess Remix)	Smith, Jr.; Diggs	RZA; Carlos Bess	3:25
11.	"Bring the Pain" (Instrumental)		RZA	3:15
12.	"The Riddler (from the "Batman Forever soundtrack")"	Smith, Jr.; Diggs; Neal Hefti	RZA	3:31
13.	"Wings of the Morning" (Dynamik Duo Mix) (with Capleton)	Smith, Jr.; Clifton George Bailey III	Lil Jon; Paul Lewis	3:52
Total length:				101:42

== Personnel ==
- Method Man – performer, producer, engineer
- RZA – producer, performer, executive producer, engineer
- Streetlife – performer
- Lounge Lo - Performer
- Raekwon – performer
- Inspectah Deck – performer
- Carlton Fisk – performer
- Blue Raspberry – vocals
- Booster – vocal
- 4th Disciple – producer
- David Sealy – engineer, assistant engineer, mixing, mixing assistant
- J. Nicholas – engineer, assistant engineer, mixing assistant
- Rich Keller – engineer, mixing, mixing engineer
- John Wydrycs – engineer, mixing
- Ken 'Duro' Ifill – engineer, assistant engineer
- Jack Hersca – engineer
- Ethan Royman – engineer
- Kevin Thomas – engineer
- Tony Dawsey – mastering
- Jeff Trotter – A&R Executive / mastering
- Shawn Kilmurray – production coordination
- Chicu Modu – photography
- Drawing Board – design

== Charts ==
=== Weekly charts ===
Chart (1994–1995)	Peak position
Canadian Albums (Billboard)	50
US Billboard 200	4
US Top R&B/Hip-Hop Albums (Billboard)	1

=== Year-end charts ===
Chart (1995)	Position
US Billboard 200	75
US Top R&B/Hip-Hop Albums (Billboard)	9

== Certifications ==
Region	Certification	Certified units/sales
Canada (Music Canada)	Platinum	100,000^{^}
United Kingdom (BPI)	Gold	100,000^{*}
United States (RIAA)	Platinum	1,000,000^{^}
^{*} Sales figures based on certification alone.^{^} Shipments figures based on certification alone.

== See also ==
- List of number-one R&B albums of 1994 (U.S.)
