= The Dirty Story: The Best of Ol' Dirty Bastard =

Greatest hits album by Ol' Dirty Bastard
- Released: August 28, 2001
- Genre: Hip hop
- Label: Elektra
- Producer: The Neptunes, RZA, Ol' Dirty Bastard, True Master, Dat Nigga Reb, Irv Gotti, Flavahood

Professional ratings
Review scores
Source	Rating
AllMusic	4.5/5 stars
The New Rolling Stone Album Guide	2/5 stars

The Dirty Story: The Best of Ol' Dirty Bastard is a greatest hits album by Ol' Dirty Bastard.

== Track listing ==
1. "Shimmy Shimmy Ya"
2. "Brooklyn Zoo"
3. "Got Your Money" feat. Kelis
4. "Dirty Dancin'" feat. Method Man
5. "Raw Hide" feat. Method Man, Raekwon
6. "Protect Ya Neck II The Zoo" feat. 12 O'Clock, 60 Second Assassin, Buddha Monk, Killah Priest, Murdoc, Prodigal Sunn, Shorty Shit Stain, Zu Keeper
7. "Recognize" feat. Chris Rock
8. "Cold Blooded"
9. "Fantasy (Remix)" feat. Mariah Carey
10. "I Can't Wait"
11. "Good Morning Heartache" feat. Lil' Mo
