= The Definitive Ol' Dirty Bastard Story =

Greatest hits album by Ol' Dirty Bastard
- Released: June 21, 2005
- Genre: Hip hop
- Label: Elektra

Professional ratings
Review scores
| Source | Rating |
|---|---|
| AllMusic | link |
| RapReviews | (8/10) link |

The Definitive Ol' Dirty Bastard Story is a "best of" album by Ol' Dirty Bastard.

== Reception ==
Reviewing the album for Pitchfork in June 2005, features editor Ryan Dombal was heavily critical of the release of the compilation given that Ol' Dirty Bastard (ODB) only ever released two solo studio albums, calling it "unnecessary", "shamelessly exploitative", "idiotic", "superfluous" and "highly repetitive". Dombal was more positive about the accompanying DVD of videos, though he also pointed out that only one of these videos — a video of ODB and the Wu Tang Clan freestyling as they walked through New York in 1995 — was likely to be new to fans of the rapper. Will Hermes, writing for Spin in August 2005, was similarly critical, saying that the compilation was "basically 2001's The Dirty Story: The Best of ODB (a shuffle mix of his first two solo records) with a few extras".

Writing for RapReviews in August 2005, Steve "Flash" Juon gave the compilation a broadly positive review, saying it was a "substantially good compilation" that gave "good value for the money to both the casual and the hardcore ODB fan".

== Track listing ==
1. "Brooklyn Zoo"
2. "Shimmy Shimmy Ya"
3. "Got Your Money (feat. Kelis)"
4. "Recognize"
5. "Protect Ya Neck II: The Zoo" (feat. Buddha Monk, Prodigal Sunn, Zu Keeper, Murdoc, Killah Priest, 12 O'Clock, Shorty Shit Stain and 60 Second Assassin)"
6. "Rollin' Wit You"
7. "Cold Blooded"
8. "Nigga Please"
9. "Good Morning Heartache (feat. Lil' Mo)"
10. "All In Together Now"
11. "I Can't Wait"
12. "Brooklyn Zoo (Clean LP Version)"
13. "Give It To Ya Raw"
14. "Raw Hide"
15. "Fantasy (Remix) (Mariah Carey feat. Ol' Dirty Bastard)"
16. "Ghetto Supastar (That Is What You Are) (Pras Michel feat. Ol' Dirty Bastard & Mýa)"
17. "Outro (Mc Jah)

Bonus DVD contains:

1. "Brooklyn Zoo" (video)
2. "Shimmy Shimmy Ya" (video)
3. "Got Your Money (feat. Kelis)" (video)
4. "Box Talk Interview" (video)
