= Da Mystery of Chessboxin' =

1993 single by Wu-Tang Clan

Single by Wu-Tang Clan

from the album Enter the Wu-Tang (36 Chambers)
- A-side: "C.R.E.A.M."
- Released: January 31, 1994
- Genre: East Coast hip-hop; hardcore hip-hop
- Length: 4:47
- Label: Loud; RCA
- Songwriter: Wu-Tang Clan
- Producers: Prince Rakeem "The Rza"; Ol' Dirty Bastard

Wu-Tang Clan singles chronology
"Protect Ya Neck" (1992)	"C.R.E.A.M." / "Da Mystery of Chessboxin'" (1994)	"Can It Be All So Simple" (1994)

Music video
- "Da Mystery of Chessboxin'" on YouTube

"Da Mystery of Chessboxin'" is a song by American hip hop group Wu-Tang Clan from their debut studio album Enter the Wu-Tang (36 Chambers). It is the B-side of their single "C.R.E.A.M." Produced by RZA and co-produced by Ol' Dirty Bastard, it contains a sample of "Tramp" by Otis Redding and Carla Thomas.

== Background ==
U-God recorded his verse before going to jail, in 15 minutes and 10 takes. RZA recorded him, saying "I want you to do that verse, and I want you to say it this way." When U-God was released, he was surprised the song had become a cult classic.

Masta Killa wrote his first rhyme ever on the song. "Da Mystery of Chessboxin'" is also the only song from Enter the Wu-Tang (36 Chambers) that he performs on.

== Composition and lyrics ==
The song begins with dialogue from the films Shaolin and Wu Tang and Five Deadly Venoms in the intro; the sample from the former compares chess to a sword fight. The instrumental features a "creaky" mandolin sample. U-God raps in the opening verse ("Raw, I'ma give it to ya with no trivia, raw like cocaine straight from Bolivia / My hip-hop will rock and shock the nation like the Emancipation Proclamation"), which follows up with verses in the order of Inspectah Deck, Raekwon, Ol' Dirty Bastard, Ghostface Killah and Masta Killa.

Despite the song's title, the lyrics do not discuss chess boxing, though they do mention chess.

== Music video ==
The music video was directed by Gerald Barclay. It was filmed at the salt mine on Staten Island. Barclay recalled, "There's a sequence in the place where Ghostface is in the bottom of the thing, we're looking down at him and it's literally the bottom of the building. There was water coming in because a boat went by. He had bought some new sneakers, and he was like, 'Gee, you got me down here, and my shoes are about to get dirty. Hurry up and get the shot…'"

== Certifications ==
Region	Certification	Certified units/sales
United States (RIAA)	Gold	500,000^{‡}
^{‡} Sales+streaming figures based on certification alone.
