= Young Dirty Bastard =

American rapper (born 1989)

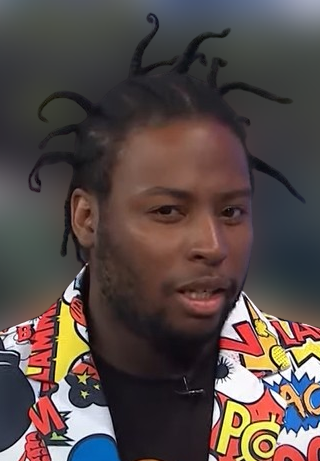
- Young Dirty Bastard in 2019
- Born: Barsun Unique Jones; April 9, 1989 (age 37)
- Children: 6
- Father: Ol' Dirty Bastard
- Young Dirty Bastard's voice Young Dirty Bastard speaking about his audition for Wu-Tang: An American Saga being rejected Recorded October 2019

Barsun Unique Jones (Note: Also spelt Bar-Sun Unique Jones) (born April 9, 1989), better known by his stage names Boy Jones and Young Dirty Bastard (often abbreviated YDB), is an American rapper. He is the son of rapper Ol' Dirty Bastard.

Creating music since childhood, he dropped out of school to begin making music professionally. After his father's death in 2004, he began performing with the Wu-Tang Clan, using a similar vocal style as his father. In 2019, he created the rap group 2nd Generation Wu with iNTeLL, PXWER, and Sun God.

== Early life ==
Barsun Unique Jones was born on April 9, 1989, to Russell Tyrone Jones (better known as Ol' Dirty Bastard) and Icelene Jones, making him a cousin of rappers RZA and GZA. He is the eldest of his father's 13 children. (Note: It is thought that Ol' Dirty Bastard had between 7 and 13 children.)

Young Dirty Bastard grew up in Brooklyn. He was often suspended from grade school. He grew up in a violent neighborhood; armed family members serving as security were a constant presence in his life and his father was shot at twice during his (Young Dirty Bastard's) childhood. Despite his father's fame, his family struggled to bring in money when he (Ol' Dirty Bastard) was incarcerated.

His father accompanied him to a show at the Apollo Theater when he was nine, inspiring him to become a rapper. Soon after that, he compiled a notebook filled with "hundreds" of rhymes, and began recording rap music on a computer. His father advised him to choose another career path. Disregarding his father's advice, Young Dirty Bastard began rapping in earnest in his mid-teens, around the time his father died of an accidental drug overdose. During the funeral, he took the stage and declared that "[my father, Ol' Dirty Bastard] ain't going nowhere... He lives through me." Subsequently, his mother took the family out of New York City to Norcross, Georgia, hoping to improve Young Dirty Bastard's school grades, and to escape relatives who wanted Ol' Dirty Bastard's royalties. Afterward, he dropped out of school to focus on making music. RZA began mentoring him and took him on tour, familiarizing him with the other members of the Wu-Tang Clan. He took the place of his late father.

== Career ==
=== Music ===
At the 2013 Rock the Bells festival, he performed alongside a hologram of his late father, for which he had provided the physical model and the voice.

In October 2018, he performed on Jimmy Kimmel Live! along with the rest of the Wu-Tang Clan.

In April 2019, Young Dirty Bastard performed "Triumph" with the surviving members of the Wu-Tang Clan on The Tonight Show Starring Jimmy Fallon. In November of that year, he formed the musical group 2nd Generation Wu with rappers iNTeLL, PXWER, and Sun God, who are all sons of members of the Wu-Tang Clan. They released their debut single that month. In October 2019, his manager claimed that he had "about ten" albums completed.

He performed as part of the Wu-Tang Clan lineup in The Final Chamber tour. He anticipates beginning a solo career after the conclusion of the tour.

=== Other ventures ===
In 2019, Young Dirty Bastard made his reality television debut on the show Growing Up Hip Hop: New York. He also tried out for the role of Ol' Dirty Bastard, his father, in Wu-Tang: An American Saga, but the role ultimately went to T.J. Atoms. RZA stated that he decided not to cast him because his acting skills were inadequate, conceding that he bears a strong visual resemblance to his father.

As of 2014, Young Dirty Bastard was planning to create a black hockey team.

== Musical style ==
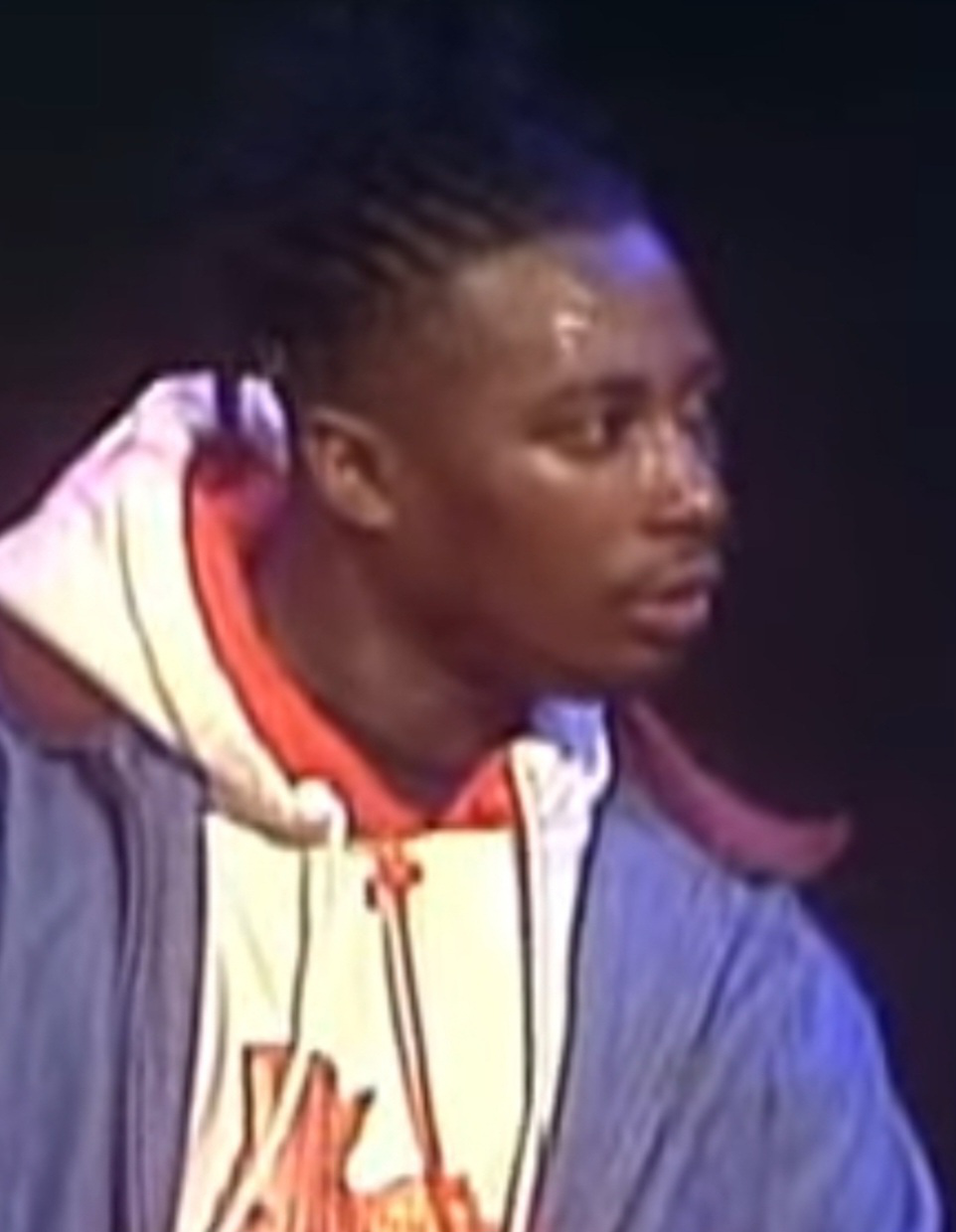
Young Dirty Bastard's father, Ol' Dirty Bastard

When performing with the Wu-Tang Clan, he fills the role of his father. According to Creative Loafing, Young Dirty Bastard has a similar "guttural drawl". Speaking on his own style, Young Dirty Bastard claimed that his father's soul "jumped" into him when he died, resulting in him being able to imitate his father well. He cites religious leader Elijah Muhammad, civil rights activist Malcolm X, Eminem, 50 Cent, and the Wu-Tang Clan as influences. In particular, he describes RZA as his mentor.

== Personal life ==
In 2014, Young Dirty Bastard revealed that he was diagnosed with testicular cancer. He stated that he would not seek any professional medical treatment, as he distrusted doctors. In 2019, he further elaborated that he had survived cancer "a few times" and had a heart attack at some point. He has also voiced support for the conspiracy theory that AIDS was artificially created.

He does not smoke or drink, which he attributes to his father's early death and his mother's disapproval. He describes himself as vegetarian, but eats chicken. He is a follower of the Nation of Islam.

As of 2019, Young Dirty Bastard has six children, and lives in Stone Mountain, Georgia as of 2014.

Young Dirty Bastard's cousins and fellow rap artists Odion and David Turner were murdered in 2021 in Portland, Oregon.

== Discography ==
=== Mixtapes ===
- Food Stamp Celebrity Vol. 1 (2011)
- A Dirty Tomorrow (2015)
- A Dirty Tomorrow 2 (2015)
