= Return to the 36 Chambers: The Dirty Version =

Studio album by Ol' Dirty Bastard
- Released: March 28, 1995
- Recorded: 1992–1995
- Studios: RZA's basement studio, New York City
- Genre: Hardcore hip-hop
- Length: 59:04
- Labels: Elektra; WMG
- Producers: RZA; True Master; 4th Disciple; Ol' Dirty Bastard; Ethan Ryman; Big Dore

Ol' Dirty Bastard chronology
Return to the 36 Chambers: The Dirty Version (1995)	Nigga Please (1999)

Wu-Tang Clan solo chronology
Tical (1994)	Return to the 36 Chambers: The Dirty Version (1995)	Only Built 4 Cuban Linx... (1995)

Singles from Return to the 36 Chambers: The Dirty Version
- 1. "Brooklyn Zoo" Released: January 21, 1995; 2. "Shimmy Shimmy Ya" Released: May 9, 1995

Return to the 36 Chambers: The Dirty Version is the debut studio album by American rapper and Wu-Tang Clan member Ol' Dirty Bastard, released March 28, 1995, by Elektra Records in the United States. Intent on creating a solo album away from Wu-Tang, he signed to Elektra in January 1993 and embarked on a two-year recording process the same year.

It was the second solo album, after Method Man's Tical, to be released from the nine-member Wu-Tang Clan following the release of their debut album. Return to the 36 Chambers was primarily produced by RZA, with additional production from Ol' Dirty Bastard, and affiliates True Master and 4th Disciple. The album features guest appearances from Wu-Tang Clan members GZA, RZA, Method Man, Raekwon, Ghostface Killah and Masta Killa as well as Wu-Tang Killa Beez.

Return to the 36 Chambers: The Dirty Version peaked at number seven on the Billboard 200 and number two on the Top R&B/Hip-Hop Albums chart. The album sold 81,000 copies in its first week, and was certified Platinum in sales by the Recording Industry Association of America (RIAA) on March 26, 2019. Upon its release, the album received positive reviews from most music critics, with many complimenting Ol' Dirty Bastard's bizarre lyrical delivery and RZA's eerie production. The album was nominated for Best Rap Album at the 1996 Grammy Awards.

== Critical reception ==
Professional ratings
Review scores
Source	Rating
AllMusic	4.5/5 stars
Chicago Tribune	2.5/4 stars
Christgau's Consumer Guide	A−
Entertainment Weekly	A−
Los Angeles Times	3/4 stars
Pitchfork	9.3/10
Rolling Stone	4/5 stars
The Rolling Stone Album Guide	4/5 stars
Select	2/5
The Source	4/5 stars

Upon its release, Return to the 36 Chambers received general acclaim, including award nominations and inclusions on year-end publications. In his review for Rolling Stone magazine, Touré commented: "With his raspy, lisp-punctuated voice and half-sung, half-rapped style, Ol' Dirty Bastard may well be the most original vocalist in hip-hop history." Entertainment Weekly's Tiarra Mukherjee thought the album showed the "raw, innovative talent of their illest member ... The RZA's signature dissonant piano loops [sparkle] behind Dirty's delirious, reverberating delivery." Michael Bonner of Melody Maker wrote, "... an hour of cruel hard and frighteningly funny hip hop; the perfect companion piece to Wu-Tang's 36 Chambers ... the songs are driven by a vicious, unstable urgency."

By contrast, Select magazine's Matt Hall was more critical of the album. His review found the album inferior to Method Man's album Tical, stating that "From the extremely long and unfunny – intro skit, its obvious ideas are spread wafer thin across the 15 tracks."

The Dirty Version was nominated for the 1996 Grammy Award for Best Rap Album, but lost to Naughty by Nature's Poverty's Paradise.

Retrospectively, the album has continually seen positive coverage. Pitchfork's contributor Sheldon Pearce lauded the album in a classic review as "a work of orchestrated negligence and a makeshift classic."

== Track listing ==
Track listing information is taken from the official liner notes and AllMusic.

Return to the 36 Chambers: The Dirty Version
No.	Title	Writer(s)	Producer(s)	Length
1.	"Intro"	Russell Jones	RZA; 4th Disciple	4:47
2.	"Shimmy Shimmy Ya"	Jones; Robert Diggs	RZA	2:41
3.	"Baby C'mon"	Jones	RZA	3:26
4.	"Brooklyn Zoo"	Jones	True Master; Ol' Dirty Bastard	3:37
5.	"Hippa to Da Hoppa"	Jones; Diggs	RZA	3:01
6.	"Raw Hide" (featuring Method Man and Raekwon)	Jones; Clifford Smith, Jr.; Corey Woods; Diggs	RZA	4:02
7.	"Damage" (featuring GZA)	Jones; Gary Grice; Diggs	RZA; 4th Disciple (co.)	2:47
8.	"Don't U Know" (featuring Killah Priest)	Jones; Walter Reed; Diggs	RZA	4:26
9.	"The Stomp"	Jones	Ol' Dirty Bastard; RZA (co.)	2:22
10.	"Goin' Down"	Jones	RZA	4:19
11.	"Drunk Game (Sweet Sugar Pie)"	Jones; Ethan Ryman	Ol' Dirty Bastard; Ethan Ryman	4:20
12.	"Snakes" (featuring Killah Priest, RZA, Masta Killa, Buddha Monk)	Jones; Reed; Jamel Irief; Ellery Chambers; Diggs	RZA	5:26
13.	"Brooklyn Zoo II (Tiger Crane)" (featuring Ghostface Killah)	Jones; Dennis Coles	RZA	7:20
14.	"Proteck Ya Neck II the Zoo" (featuring Buddha Monk, Prodigal Sunn, Zu Keeper, Murdoc, Killah Priest, 12 O'Clock, Shorty Shit Stain and 60 Second Assassin)	Jones; Odion Turner; Reed; Lamar Ruff; Frederick Cuffie Jr.; Chambers	RZA	4:00
15.	"Cuttin' Headz" (featuring RZA)	Jones; Diggs	RZA	2:28
Total length:				59:04

CD bonus tracks
No.	Title	Writer(s)	Producer	Length
16.	"Dirty Dancin'" (featuring Method Man)	Jones; Smith, Jr.	RZA	2:42
17.	"Harlem World"	Jones; Johnie Spivey Jr.	Big Dore	6:15
18.	"Ol' Dirty's Back" (featuring 12 O'Clock)	Jones; Turner	Popa Chief	4:12
Total length:				72:13

25th Anniversary Remaster
No.	Title	Writer(s)	Producer	Length
19.	"Shimmy Shimmy Ya" (Extended Version)	Jones; Diggs	RZA	3:49
20.	"Don't U Know, Pt. II"	Jones; Diggs	RZA	5:08
21.	"Give It To Ya Raw" (SD50 Remix)	Jones; Diggs	RZA; SD50	4:08
22.	"Brooklyn Zoo" (Stripped Version)	Jones	True Master; Ol’ Dirty Bastard	3:09
23.	"Shimmy Shimmy Ya" (Stripped Version)	Jones; Diggs	RZA	3:03
24.	"Shimmy Shimmy Ya" (Instrumental)		RZA	2:46
25.	"Baby C'mon" (Instrumental)		RZA	3:38
26.	"Brooklyn Zoo" (Instrumental)		True Master; Ol' Dirty Bastard	3:51
27.	"Hippa To Da Hoppa" (Instrumental)		RZA	2:47
28.	"Raw Hide" (Instrumental)		RZA	4:10
29.	"Damage" (Instrumental)		RZA; 4th Disciple (co.)	2:51
30.	"Don't U Know" (Instrumental)		RZA	4:39
31.	"The Stomp" (Instrumental)		Ol' Dirty Bastard; RZA (co.)	3:48
32.	"Goin' Down" (Instrumental)		RZA	3:48
33.	"Drunk Game (Sweet Sugar Pie)" (Instrumental)		Ol' Dirty Bastard; Ethan Ryman	4:10
34.	"Snakes" (Instrumental)		RZA	5:16
35.	"Brooklyn Zoo II (Tiger Crane)" (Instrumental)		RZA	4:58
36.	"Proteck Ya Neck II The Zoo" (Instrumental)		RZA	3:59
37.	"Dirty Dancin'" (Instrumental)		RZA	2:46
38.	"Harlem World" (Instrumental)		Big Dore	6:22
39.	"Shimmy Shimmy Ya" (Extended Version; Instrumental)		RZA	3:39
40.	"Shimmy Shimmy Ya" (Studio Ton Remix; Instrumental)		RZA	4:39
41.	"Brooklyn Zoo" (Lord Digga Remix; Instrumental)		Lord Digga; The Witchdoc	4:00
42.	"Brooklyn Zoo" (Lord Digga Remix)	Jones	Lord Digga; The Witchdoc	4:06
43.	"Shimmy Shimmy Ya" (Extended Mix; A Capella)	Jones; Diggs		3:27
Total length:				171:14

== Personnel ==
=== Musicians ===
- Ol' Dirty Bastard – assistant engineer, mixing, producer, vocals
- RZA – producer, mixing, vocals
- Ghostface Killah, GZA, Masta Killa, Method Man, Raekwon, Killah Priest, Sunz Of Man, Brooklyn Zu – vocals
- Buddha Monk – vocals, mixing
- Big Dore – producer vocals

=== Additional ===
- Big Dore – producer
- True Master – producer
- Ethan Ryman – producer, engineer
- John Wydrycs, Tim Latham – engineer, mixing
- Jimmie Lee, Jack Hersca – engineer, assistant engineer
- Deden Sumandani – mixing
- Martin Czembor – assistant engineer, mixing
- David Sealy, Jay Nicholas – assistant engineer
- Alli – art direction
- Danny Clinch – photography

== Charts ==
=== Weekly charts ===
Weekly chart performance for Return to the 36 Chambers: The Dirty Version
Chart (1995)	Peak position
Canada Top Albums/CDs (RPM)	48
UK Dance Albums (Music Week)	1
US Billboard 200	7
US Top R&B/Hip-Hop Albums (Billboard)	2

Weekly chart performance for Return to the 36 Chambers: The Dirty Version
Chart (2023)	Peak position
Hungarian Albums (MAHASZ)	32

=== Year-end charts ===
1995 year-end chart performance for Return to the 36 Chambers: The Dirty Version
Chart (1995)	Position
US Billboard 200	149
US Top R&B/Hip-Hop Albums (Billboard)	32

== Certifications ==
Certifications for Return to the 36 Chambers: The Dirty Version
Region	Certification	Certified units/sales
United Kingdom (BPI)	Silver	60,000^{‡}
United States (RIAA)	Platinum	1,000,000^{‡}
^{‡} Sales+streaming figures based on certification alone.

=== Accolades ===
- (*) signifies unordered lists

Publication	Country	Accolade	Year	Rank
Blender	United States	500 CDs You Must Own Before You Die	2003	*
Ego Trip	United States	Hip Hop's 25 Greatest Albums by Year 1980–1998	1999	4
Hip Hop Connection	United Kingdom	The 100 Greatest Rap Albums 1995–2005	2006	32
Les Inrockuptibles	France	Albums of the Year	1995	*
Muzik	United Kingdom	Albums of the Year	1996	15
Ned Raggett	United States	The Top 136 Albums of the Nineties	1999	87
Pop	Sweden	Albums of the Year	1995	14
The Source	United States	The 100 Best Rap Albums of All Time	1998	*
Spex	Germany	The 100 Albums of the Century	1999	67
Spex	Germany	Albums of the Year	1995	1
The Village Voice	United States	Pazz & Jop	1996	39
