= Free to Be Dirty! Live =

Live album by Ol' Dirty Bastard
- Released: August 30, 2005
- Recorded: Toad's Place, New Haven, CT; October, 2003
- Genre: Hip hop
- Label: Nutech Digital
- Producer: Bryan Domyan, Cherry Jones, Jarred Weisfeld, Larry Perel, Russell Jones

Free to Be Dirty! Live is a 2005 live album by Ol' Dirty Bastard in collaboration with Brooklyn Zu. The release is in CD and DVD format.

Professional ratings
Review scores
Source	Rating
AllMusic	2/5 stars

== Track listing ==
No.	Title	Length
1.	"Intro"	0:21
2.	"You Nasty"	3:45
3.	"Cold Blooded"	3:50
4.	"Interlude #1"	0:33
5.	"Good Morning Heartache"	4:13
6.	"Got Your Money"	3:59
7.	"Interlude #2"	0:37
8.	"Big Baby Jesus"	2:48
9.	"Interlude #3"	1:14
10.	"Stomp"	2:23
11.	"Hippa to da Hoppa"	2:28
12.	"Don't You Know"	4:28
13.	"Shimmy Shimmy Ya"	2:35
14.	"Baby Baby C'mon"	2:47
15.	"Interlude #4"	0:52
16.	"Brooklyn Zoo"	3:20
17.	"Interlude #5"	1:04
18.	"Pop Shit"	3:26
19.	"Recognize"	3:30
20.	"Nigga Please"	1:55
21.	"Outro"	1:13
22.	"Outro (Studio)"	1:55
