= I'll Be There for You/You're All I Need to Get By =

1995 single by Method Man

Single by Method Man featuring Mary J. Blige

from the album Tical
- Released: April 25, 1995
- Genre: Hip-hop; hip-hop soul
- Length: 3:45
- Label: Def Jam
- Songwriters: Nickolas Ashford; Robert Diggs; Valerie Simpson; Clifford Smith
- Producers: RZA (LP version, video version); Sean "Puffy" Combs, Trackmasters (radio version)

Method Man singles chronology
"Release Yo' Delf" (1995)	"I'll Be There for You/You're All I Need to Get By" (1995)	"How High" (1995)

Mary J. Blige singles chronology
"Mary Jane (All Night Long)" (1995)	"I'll Be There for You/You're All I Need to Get By" (1995)	"You Bring Me Joy" (1995)

Music video
- "All I Need" (Razor Sharp Remix) on YouTube

"I'll Be There for You/You're All I Need to Get By" is a duet song by American rapper Method Man, featuring American singer-songwriter Mary J. Blige. The song is a remix of Method Man's "All I Need", which appears on his debut studio album, Tical (1994). The song, a hip hop soul record, was released as a single by Def Jam Recordings and PolyGram Records on April 25, 1995. It peaked at numbers three and six on the US Billboard Hot 100 and Cash Box Top 100 charts.

All 3 versions of this song contain an interpolation of Marvin Gaye and Tammi Terrell's hit, "You're All I Need to Get By". The first remix and the original were produced by Method Man's Wu-Tang Clan cohort RZA. The remix was released as a single and is also known as "I'll Be There for You/You're All I Need to Get By (Razor Sharp Mix)". The music video for the remix was directed by American director Diane Martel.

The third version of the remix was released for radio airplay, titled "I'll Be There for You/You're All I Need to Get By (Puff Daddy Mix)", which was produced by Sean "Puffy" Combs and Trackmasters. The Puff Daddy version of the song contains a new instrumental which includes a repeated vocal sample from the Notorious B.I.G.'s song, "Me & My Bitch" (from his debut Ready to Die, released the same year). The song sold over 800,000 copies and was certified platinum by the Recording Industry Association of America (RIAA).

== Composition ==
Method Man raps three verses, while Mary J. Blige sings the intro, the chorus, and backing vocals. The song is often cited as the first hybrid of what's now known as "Thug-Love" duets.

In a July 2012 interview with Complex magazine, Jean Claude "Poke" Olivier—one-half of the production team the Trackmasters —claimed they were the actual producers behind the "Puff Daddy" remix, but were never properly credited for it. The Trackmasters claim that they were only credited as session musicians for programming the drums while Combs was credited as the producer.

== Critical reception ==
Simon Price from Melody Maker named it Single of the Week, adding, "Here, sweet Mary J coos the chorus to Diana Ross' 'You're All I Need to Get By', while scary Method says he wants him'n'her to live together in a "a fat ass crib with thousands of kids". Heartwarming yet chilling, half 'Beauty and the Beast', half 'Nightstalker'." Dele Fadele from NME wrote, "The hip-hop fraternity will probably approach this pairing with a large shovel and a bale of hay, but they'll be the ones missing out. [...] The mix by Sean 'Puffy' Combs is slick as hell, but still booming, with a buried sample of a man at the end of his tether hoping he and she live together, cry together and die together." Leesa Daniels from Smash Hits gave it a score of four out of five, saying, "A love song in a rap style that doesn't refer to women as female dogs or gardening tools! See it can be done. [...] Highly enjoyable."

== Chart performance ==
The song (all versions) peaked at number three on the US Billboard Hot 100 chart on June 3, 1995. The song also reached number one on the Billboard R&B singles chart in the May 20, 1995 issue of Billboard Magazine, a position it held for three weeks. On the US Billboard Hot 100 and Cash Box Top 100 charts, it peaked at numbers three and six.

== Live performances ==
In 2009, Method Man and Mary J. Blige performed the song together at VH1's sixth annual Hip Hop Honors ceremony. In 2019, Mary J. Blige performed "I'll Be There For You/You're All I Need to Get By" with Method Man during her BET Awards Lifetime Achievement Award performance which included a medley of songs and featured artists. CNN noted that the performance of the song "thrilled the crowd", who rapped along with Method Man's verses.

== Accolades ==
The song won the Grammy Award for Best Rap Performance by a Duo or Group in 1996.

In 2008, the song was ranked number 44 on VH1's "100 Greatest Songs of Hip Hop" list.

In 2012, Complex ranked the song number one on its list of "The 25 Best Hip-Hop Love Songs."

== Track listings and formats ==
All original tracks produced by RZA

- US, CD Maxi-Single
1. "I'll Be There For You/You're All I Need To Get By" (Puff Daddy Mix) — 5:08 ^{a}
2. "I'll Be There For You/You're All I Need To Get By" (Puff Daddy Instrumental) — 5:04
3. "I'll Be There For You/You're All I Need To Get By" (Razor Sharp Mix) — 3:53 ^{b}
4. "I'll Be There For You/You're All I Need To Get By" (Razor Sharp Instrumental) — 5:04
5. "What The Blood Clot" (LP Version) — 3:25
- UK, CD Maxi-Single
1. "I'll Be There For You/You're All I Need To Get By" (Razor Sharp Mix) — 3:25 ^{b}
2. "Bring The Pain" (Chemical Vocal) — 5:58 ^{c}
3. "Release Yo' Delf" (Prodigy Mix) — 5:55 ^{d}
4. "Bring The Pain" (Chemical Instrumental) — 5:21 ^{c}
- Germany, CD Maxi-Single
1. "I'll Be There For You/You're All I Need To Get By" (Puff Daddy Mix) — 5:08 ^{a}
2. "I'll Be There For You/You're All I Need To Get By" (Razor Sharp Mix) — 3:53 ^{b}
3. "I'll Be There For You/You're All I Need To Get By" (LP Version) — 3:16 ^{a}
4. "I'll Be There For You/You're All I Need To Get By" (Puff Daddy Instrumental) — 5:04
5. "What The Blood Clot" (LP Version) — 3:25

^{a} Remix production by Sean "Puffy" Combs
^{b} Remix production by Prince Rakeem "RZA"
^{c} Remix production by Chemical Brothers
^{d} Remix production by the Prodigy
^{e} Remix production Trackmasters

== Personnel ==
- Method Man – Rap vocals
- Mary J. Blige – Lead vocals, background vocals
- RZA – Producer, remix producer
- Puff Daddy – Remix producer
- Trackmasters - Remix producer
- Jeff Trotter – A&R
- Drew Dixon – A&R

== Charts ==
=== Weekly charts ===
Chart (1995)	Peak position
Canada Retail Singles (The Record)	1
Europe (Eurochart Hot 100)	35
Germany (GfK)	100
Netherlands (Dutch Top 40 Tipparade)	2
Netherlands (Single Top 100)	36
New Zealand (Recorded Music NZ)	22
Scottish Singles Sales (Official Charts)	32
UK Singles (Official Charts)	10
UK Dance (Official Charts)	2
UK Hip Hop/R&B (Official Charts)	2
US Billboard Hot 100	3
US Dance Singles Sales (Billboard)	1
US Hot R&B/Hip-Hop Songs (Billboard)	1
US Hot Rap Songs (Billboard)	1
US Rhythmic Airplay (Billboard)	12
US Cash Box Top 100	6

=== Year-end charts ===
Chart (1995)	Position
US Billboard Hot 100	42
US Hot R&B Singles (Billboard)	15
US Hot Rap Singles (Billboard)	2
US Maxi-Singles Sales (Billboard)	1

=== Decade-end charts ===
Chart (1990–1999)	Position
Canada (Nielsen SoundScan)	38

== Certifications ==
Region	Certification	Certified units/sales
United States (RIAA)	Platinum	800,000

== See also ==
- R&B number-one hits of 1995 (USA)
