= Release Yo' Delf =

1994 song by Method Man

Single by Method Man

from the album Tical
- Released: January 11, 1995
- Genre: East Coast hip hop
- Length: 4:15
- Label: Def Jam; PolyGram
- Songwriter(s): Clifford Smith Jr.; Robert Diggs; Candi Lindsey; Freddie Perren; Dino Fekaris
- Producer(s): RZA

Method Man singles chronology
"Bring the Pain" (1994)	"Release Yo' Delf" (1995)	"I'll Be There for You/You're All I Need to Get By" (1995)

Music video
- "Release Yo' Delf" on YouTube

"Release Yo' Delf" is a song by American rapper Method Man and the second single from his debut studio album Tical (1994). It features vocals from American singer Blue Raspberry, who interpolates "I Will Survive" by Gloria Gaynor. Produced by RZA, the song contains a sample of "Treasure of San Miguel" by Herb Alpert & The Tijuana Brass.

== Background ==
RZA chose "Release Yo' Delf" to be the second single from Tical against Method Man's wishes. The music video for the song was shot by Steve Carr. Method Man recalls, "I was mad at him because I didn't like the look and the feel of the video. It was like he was trying to recreate 'Method Man,' and that wasn't gonna happen."

== Composition ==
The song contains gritty drums as well as horns sampled from "Treasure of San Miguel" that have been described as "lively, upbeat" and "rallying, warlike", In the chorus, Blue Raspberry sings an interpolation of "I Will Survive". There is also a refrain in which Method Man chants, "Keep it moving".

== Charts ==
Chart (1995)	Peak position
UK Singles (OCC)	46
US Billboard Hot 100	98
US Hot Rap Songs (Billboard)	28
