= Bring the Pain =

1994 single by Method Man

Single by Method Man

from the album Tical
- B-side: "P.L.O. Style"
- Released: October 25, 1994
- Recorded: 1994
- Genre: East Coast hip hop; hardcore hip hop
- Length: 3:09
- Label: Def Jam; PolyGram
- Songwriters: Clifford Smith; Robert Diggs
- Producer: RZA

Method Man singles chronology
"Bring the Pain" (1994)	"Release Yo' Delf" (1995)

Music video
- "Bring the Pain" on YouTube

"Bring the Pain" is a song recorded by American rapper Method Man, released in October 1994 by Def Jam and PolyGram, as the first single from his debut album, Tical (1994). It was produced by RZA, and peaked at numbers 45 and 71 on the US Billboard Hot 100 and Cash Box Top 100 charts. The accompanying music video was released for the week ending on October 23, 1994.

Comedian Chris Rock named his 1996 tour and television special "Bring the Pain" after this song. Method Man is credited in the special's closing credits. The song was also featured in the 2002 film 8 Mile.

Industrial music band Mindless Self Indulgence covered it on their 1999 album, Tight, as did Candiria on their album The COMA Imprint. The beat was sampled by Timbaland for a song of the same name on Missy Elliott's Under Construction, which features Method Man. Tupac Shakur did an Interpolation of the song on his 1996 album All Eyez on Me on the track No More Pain, and even gave Method Man and RZA credits in the album's liner notes.

The Chemical Brothers' remix was included in Pitchfork Media's 2010 list of "twenty-five great remixes" of the 1990s.

== Track listing ==
1. "Bring the Pain" (LP version)
2. "Bring the Pain" (Radio edit)
3. "Bring the Pain" (Instrumental)
4. "P.L.O. Style" (LP version)
5. "P.L.O. Style" (Instrumental)
6. "P.L.O. Style" (Acappella)

== Charts ==
=== Weekly charts ===
Chart (1994–1995)	Peak position
US Billboard Hot 100	45
US Hot R&B/Hip-Hop Songs (Billboard)	30
US Hot Rap Songs (Billboard)	4
US Cash Box Top 100	71

=== Year-end charts ===
Chart (1994)	Position
US Maxi-Singles Sales (Billboard)	39
