= C.R.E.A.M. =

1994 single by Wu-Tang Clan

Single by Wu-Tang Clan

from the album Enter the Wu-Tang (36 Chambers)
- B-side: "Da Mystery of Chessboxin'"
- Released: January 31, 1994
- Studio: Firehouse, New York City
- Genre: East Coast hip-hop
- Length: 4:12
- Label: Loud
- Songwriter: Wu-Tang Clan
- Producer: Prince Rakeem "The Rza"

Wu-Tang Clan singles chronology
"Protect Ya Neck" (1992)	"C.R.E.A.M." (1994)	"Can It Be All So Simple" (1994)

Music video
- "C.R.E.A.M." on YouTube

"C.R.E.A.M." (a backronym of "Cash Rules Everything Around Me") is a song by the American hardcore hip hop group Wu-Tang Clan, released on January 31, 1994 by Loud Records, as the second single from their debut studio album, Enter the Wu-Tang (36 Chambers) (1993). The song was produced by the group's de facto leader RZA, and contains a sample of the Charmels' 1967 song "As Long As I've Got You" throughout. It features two verses from members Raekwon and Inspectah Deck, who discuss their upbringings while living in New York City, and Method Man, who sings its hook. Its music video, featuring all Wu-Tang Clan members in New York City, was released in 1994.

"C.R.E.A.M." achieved lukewarm commercial success, peaking at number 60 on the US Billboard Hot 100 in 1994. The song received universal praise from music critics, many of whom described it as one of the best songs on Enter the Wu-Tang. Since its release, the song has been called one of the greatest hip-hop songs of all time, with some who even described it as one of the greatest songs of all time. It has since been sampled by numerous artists and was certified 4× Platinum in the United States in 2025.

== Background and composition ==
The song was originally titled "Lifestyles of the Mega-Rich".

I remember writing to the beat a long time ago before we actually came out. That beat is old. That was probably like a '89 beat. RZA had it that long because he had a bunch of breaks. He had all kind of things and he was making beats back then, but we was just picking and that beat happened to always sit around and I would be like, 'I want that beat, so don't give that beat to nobody.' And he kept his word and let me have it.

— Raekwon, 2011

Unlike most tracks on Enter the Wu-Tang, "C.R.E.A.M." contains a somber and more relaxed style, with lyrics that focus on storytelling, along with "Can It Be All So Simple" and "Tearz". Wilson McBee of PopMatters describes the song as "a hard dose of reality," compared to the rest of the album, a "kung-fu–fueled fantasy."

Although credited to the entire group, "C.R.E.A.M." only features three of the nine Wu-Tang Clan members: Raekwon, who provides the first verse, Inspectah Deck, who provides the second, longer verse, and Method Man, who provides the song's hook: Cash rules everything around me, C.R.E.A.M./Get the money; dollar, dollar bill, y'all. According to Raekwon, Method Man wrote the hook but it was his friend Raider Ruckus who came up with the phrase 'cash rules everything around me.' In his verse, Raekwon chronicles his life, showcasing his move to Staten Island and his time living in New York City. Inspectah Deck, in his verse, paints a picture of his life, going from a "delinquent teen to juvenile offender to would-be mentor."

The "dollar, dollar bill y'all" part is the interpolation of Jimmy Spicer's 1983 track "Money (Dollar Bill Y'all)". The track contains a sample of the Charmels' 1967 song "As Long As I've Got You", specifically the song's opening piano riff and its drums, which are looped continuously throughout.

== Release and reception ==
"C.R.E.A.M."
"C.R.E.A.M." features two verses from Raekwon and Inspectah Deck, who discuss their upbringings while living in New York City. It samples the Charmels' 1967 song "As Long As I've Got You".

"C.R.E.A.M." was released on November 9, 1993, as the eighth track on Wu-Tang Clan's debut studio album Enter the Wu-Tang (36 Chambers). The song was subsequently released as the third single from the album on January 31, 1994, through Loud Records on vinyl and CD formats, under the title "C.R.E.A.M. (Cash Rules Everything Around Me)"; the cassette single was released on March 15, 1994. Its release came at a time when West Coast hip hop was dominating the hip hop charts, originating with releases such as N.W.A's Straight Outta Compton (1989) and solidified by Dr. Dre's The Chronic (1992). While East coast hip hop had begun to rise once again with contemporary releases by Puff Daddy and Bad Boy Records, Black Moon, De La Soul, and Digable Planets, the release of Enter the Wu-Tang laid the groundwork for the hardcore hip hop genre and rebirth of the New York hip hop scene. While the album wasn't immediately commercially successful, the release of "C.R.E.A.M." solidified the group's status as a force to be reckoned with and earned the group a devoted following. The success of "C.R.E.A.M." led to five of the group's members – GZA, RZA, Raekwon, Method Man, and Ol' Dirty Bastard – earning solo contracts from Loud Records; these five went on to release solo albums over the next three years, with RZA being the primary producer for all of them.

The song has received universal acclaim from music critics, calling it one of the best songs on Enter the Wu-Tang. Brody Kenny of Consequence of Sound called it "iconic and somber" and praised Inspectah Deck's verse, describing him as the most underrated member of the group (having never had a RZA-produced classic solo album). The song was described as a "classic" by Classic Hip Hop Magazine in their review of the album in 2018. When reviewing Enter the Wu-Tang in 2013 for its 20th anniversary, Jason Lipshultz of Billboard praised the production, calling it "still devastatingly layered." Lipshultz found it to be an odd choice to place the track between two less serious tracks ("Wu-Tang Clan Ain't Nothin' Ta Fuck Wit" and "Method Man") but found it to be "the beauty of the Wu: after entertaining listeners with braggadocio and jokes, they can flip the switch and deliver poignant realism."

Since its release, multiple publications have listed "C.R.E.A.M." among the best hip-hop songs of all time, with some even describing it as one of the greatest songs of all time. In 2011, Time included the song on its list of the All-Time 100 Greatest Songs. ThoughtCo. ranked the song number 20 on their list of the 100 Best Rap Songs of All Time. Their description reads "Never has there been a wildly influential hip-hop song so soothing by a group so blunt as Wu-Tang's "C.R.E.A.M." That is the genius of The RZA." In 2012, Rolling Stone magazine ranked the song number 11 on its list of The 50 Greatest Hip-Hop Songs of All Time, writing "Part of Wu-Tang's greatness was their messy, multitudinous sprawl, but the best song on their debut is ruthlessly efficient: just two breathless verses, plus the catchiest acronym in history, laying out the ground rules of street capitalism." The magazine later included it in their 2021 revised list of the 500 Greatest Songs of All Time at number 107. The song was also included on The Source magazine's 100 Best Rap Singles list in 2015. The song was voted number 13 on VH1's 100 Greatest Hip-Hop Songs list in 2008.

== Music video ==
The music video was directed by Ralph McDaniels. The video for "C.R.E.A.M." features the members of the Wu-Tang Clan starting off at the projects in Staten Island and moving on to a more lavish lifestyle of champagne and Mercedes. The video for this single also features classic early '90s urban New York styles of dress, as the majority of the people in the video are wearing goose-downs, Champion hoodies, black skullies, and either wheat or black Timberlands.

== Commercial performance ==
On the US Billboard Hot Rap Songs chart, the song debuted at number 27 for the issue date of February 19, 1994, and entered the top 25 of the chart by climbing five places the following week to number 22. The same week as its debut on the Hot Rap Songs chart, the song entered the US Hot R&B/Hip-Hop Songs chart at number 84. The song debuted at number 96 on the US Billboard Hot 100 for the issue dated March 12. "C.R.E.A.M." eventually peaked at number 60 on the Hot 100 on April 23, 1994. That same week, it peaked at number eight and number 32 on the Hot Rap Songs and Hot R&B/Hip-Hop Songs charts respectively. By having reached number 60 on the Hot 100, the song stands as the highest charting Wu-Tang Clan track ever. In 2025, "C.R.E.A.M." was certified 4× Platinum in the United States by the RIAA for sales of 4,000,000 units, 27 years after its original release.

== Legacy ==
The phrase cream has become a slang term for money, and it has been used abundantly by other rappers since then.

The song was featured in the 2002 film 8 Mile. Composer Ramin Djawadi, notable for scoring the soundtracks for HBO's series Game of Thrones, covered the song for the HBO series Westworld, appearing in the fifth episode of the show's second season, "Akane no Mai". Djawadi's cover was praised by Julia Alexander of Polygon, who compared it to Djawadi's other Westworld covers, including "Runaway" by Kanye West and "Heart-Shaped Box" by Nirvana. Drake and Jay-Z interpolated the song's hook for their song "Pound Cake / Paris Morton Music 2" on the former's 2013 studio album, Nothing Was the Same. For her 2019 EP She Is Coming, American singer-songwriter Miley Cyrus sampled the song for her promotional single "D.R.E.A.M." (an acronym for "drugs rule everything around me"), which features Wu-Tang Clan member Ghostface Killah.

== Personnel ==
Credits adapted from the single's liner notes and Tidal.

- Producer, arranger, mixing engineer, and programmer – Prince Rakeem "The Rza"
- Composers and lyricists – Wu-Tang Clan
- Engineer – Ethan Ryman
- Scratches – 4th Disciple
- Performer – Raekwon (first verse), Inspectah Deck (second verse), Method Man (chorus)

== Track listing ==
Per the single's liner notes.

=== A-side ===
1. "C.R.E.A.M. (Cash Rules Everything Around Me)" (radio edit) – 4:04
2. "C.R.E.A.M. (Cash Rules Everything Around Me)" (album version) – 4:03
3. "C.R.E.A.M. (Cash Rules Everything Around Me)" (a cappella) – 2:37
4. "C.R.E.A.M. (Cash Rules Everything Around Me)" (instrumental) – 3:38

=== B-side ===
1. "Da Mystery of Chessboxin'" (radio edit) – 4:40
2. "Da Mystery of Chessboxin'" (album version) – 4:48
3. "Da Mystery of Chessboxin'" (a cappella) – 1:22
4. "Da Mystery of Chessboxin'" (instrumental) – 4:39

== Charts ==
=== Weekly charts ===
Chart (1994)	Peak position
US Billboard Hot 100	60
US Dance Singles Sales (Billboard)	1
US Hot R&B/Hip-Hop Songs (Billboard)	32
US Hot Rap Songs (Billboard)	8

=== Year-end charts ===
Chart (1994)	Position
US Maxi-Singles Sales (Billboard)	7

== Certifications ==
Region	Certification	Certified units/sales
New Zealand (RMNZ)	2× Platinum	60,000^{‡}
United Kingdom (BPI)	Gold	400,000^{‡}
United States (RIAA)	4× Platinum	4,000,000^{‡}
United States (RIAA) Mastertone	Gold	500,000^{*}
^{*} Sales figures based on certification alone.^{‡} Sales+streaming figures based on certification alone.
