= Can It Be All So Simple =

Single by Wu-Tang Clan

from the album Enter the Wu-Tang (36 Chambers)
- B-side: "Wu-Tang Clan Ain't Nuthing ta F' Wit"
- Released: February 22, 1994
- Recorded: 1993
- Studio: Firehouse Studio (New York City)
- Genre: East Coast hip-hop; hardcore hip-hop
- Length: 4:19 (radio edit); 4:43 (album version); 6:52 (album version with "Intermission")
- Label: Loud
- Songwriter: Wu-Tang Clan
- Producer: Prince Rakeem

Wu-Tang Clan singles chronology
"C.R.E.A.M." (1994)	"Can It Be All So Simple" (1994)	"Triumph" (1997)

Music video
- "Can It Be All So Simple" on YouTube

"Can It Be All So Simple" is the third and final single from Wu-Tang Clan's critically acclaimed debut album Enter the Wu-Tang (36 Chambers). It features production from RZA (credited as Prince Rakeem) that samples Gladys Knight & the Pips' cover of "The Way We Were". The song reached number nine on the Hot Dance Music/Maxi-Singles Sales chart, number twenty four on the Hot Rap Tracks chart and number eighty two on the Hot R&B/Hip-Hop Singles & Tracks chart.

"Can It Be All So Simple" features rapping from Ghostface Killah and Raekwon. Its lyrics deal with a glorified mafioso lifestyle. In the song, Raekwon and Ghostface discuss the hardships of growing up in New York City during the 1980s, and how they want to live a lavish and famous lifestyle to escape the hardships of life. The music video was directed by Hype Williams, with images similar to the song's content and a cameo by MC Eiht.

A remix with new lyrics can be found on Raekwon's debut album Only Built 4 Cuban Linx.... Additionally, Lauryn Hill's "Ex-Factor" uses the break beat from "Can It Be All So Simple".

== Song order ==
=== Original ===
- Intro: RZA and Raekwon
- First verse: Raekwon
  - Chorus: Raekwon and Ghostface Killah
- Second verse: Ghostface Killah

=== Remix ===
- Intro: Raekwon and Ghostface Killah
- First verse: Ghostface Killah
  - Chorus: Raekwon and Ghostface Killah
- Second verse: Raekwon
- Outro: Raekwon and Ghostface Killah

== Track listing ==
=== A-side ===
1. "Can It Be All Be So Simple" (Radio Edit) – (4:19)
2. "Can It Be All So Simple" (Album Version) – (4:43)
3. "Can It Be All So Simple" (Instrumental) – (5:03)

=== B-side ===
1. "Wu-Tang Clan Ain't Nuthing ta F' Wit" (Radio Edit) – (3:36)
2. "Wu-Tang Clan Ain't Nuthing ta F' Wit" (Album Version) – (3:36)
3. "Wu-Tang Clan Ain't Nuthing ta F' Wit" (Instrumental) – (3:31)
