= Enter the Wu-Tang (36 Chambers) =

Studio album by Wu-Tang Clan
- Released: November 9, 1993
- Recorded: 1992–1993
- Studios: Firehouse (Brooklyn, New York)
- Genres: East Coast hip-hop; hardcore hip-hop; boom bap; alternative hip-hop
- Length: 58:26
- Labels: Loud; RCA
- Producer: Prince Rakeem "The RZA" (also exec.)

Wu-Tang Clan chronology
Enter the Wu-Tang (36 Chambers) (1993)	Wu-Tang Forever (1997)

Singles from Enter the Wu-Tang (36 Chambers)
- 1. "Protect Ya Neck" Released: December 14, 1992; 2. "C.R.E.A.M." Released: January 31, 1994; 3. "Can It Be All So Simple" Released: February 22, 1994

Enter the Wu-Tang (36 Chambers), often referred to as simply 36 Chambers, is the debut studio album by the American hip-hop collective Wu-Tang Clan, released on November 9, 1993, by Loud Records and RCA Records. The recording sessions took place during late 1992 to early 1993 at Firehouse Studio in New York City, and the album was produced by the group's de facto leader RZA. Its title originates from the martial arts films Enter the Dragon (1973) and The 36th Chamber of Shaolin (1978).

The distinctive, gritty sound of Enter the Wu-Tang (36 Chambers) created a blueprint for hardcore hip-hop during the 1990s, and helped return New York City hip-hop to national prominence. Its sound also became greatly influential in modern hip-hop production, while the group members' explicit, humorous, and free-associative lyrics have served as a template for many subsequent rap records. Serving as a landmark release in the era of hip-hop known as the East Coast Renaissance, its influence helped lead the way for several other East Coast rappers, including Nas, the Notorious B.I.G., Mobb Deep, and Jay-Z.

Despite its raw, underground sound, the album had surprising chart success, peaking at number 41 on the US Billboard 200 chart, selling 30,000 copies in its first week on sale. By 1995, it was certified Platinum by the Recording Industry Association of America, and in November 2025 it was certified quadruple platinum. Initially receiving positive reviews from most music critics, Enter the Wu-Tang (36 Chambers) has since been widely regarded as one of the most significant albums of the 1990s, as well as one of the greatest hip-hop albums of all time. In 2020, the album was ranked 27th on Rolling Stone's updated list of the 500 Greatest Albums of All Time. In 2022, the album was selected by the Library of Congress for preservation in the National Recording Registry for being "culturally, historically, or aesthetically significant".

== Background ==
In the late 1980s, cousins Robert Diggs, Gary Grice, and Russell Jones formed a group named Force of the Imperial Master, also known as the All in Together Now Crew. Each member recorded under an alias: Grice as The Genius, Diggs as Prince Rakeem or The Scientist, and Jones as The Specialist. The group never signed to a major label, but caught the attention of the New York City rap scene and was recognized by rapper Biz Markie. By 1991, The Genius and Prince Rakeem were signed to separate record labels. The Genius released Words from the Genius (1991) on Cold Chillin' Records and Prince Rakeem released Ooh I Love You Rakeem (1991) on Tommy Boy Records. Both were soon dropped by their labels. Embittered but unbowed, they refocused their efforts and on new monikers; The Genius became GZA (pronounced "jizza"), while Prince Rakeem became RZA (pronounced "rizza"). RZA discussed the matter in the book The Wu-Tang Manual (2005), stating "[Tommy Boy] made the decision to sign House of Pain over us. When they dropped me, I was thinking, 'Damn, they chose a bunch of whiteboy shit over me.'"

RZA began collaborating with Dennis Coles, later known as Ghostface Killah, another rapper from the Stapleton Houses in Staten Island. The duo decided to create a hip-hop group whose ethos would be a blend of "Eastern philosophy picked up from kung fu movies, watered-down Five-Percent Nation preaching picked up on the New York streets, and comic books."

== Recording and production ==
Enter the Wu-Tang (36 Chambers) was recorded at Firehouse Studio in New York City. The album was produced, mixed, arranged, and programmed by RZA, and was mastered at The Hit Factory in New York City by Chris Gehringer. Because of an extremely limited budget, the group was only able to record in a small, inexpensive studio; with up to eight of the nine Wu-Tang members in the studio at once, the quarters were frequently crowded. To decide who appeared on each song, RZA forced the Wu-Tang rappers to battle with each other. This competition led to the track "Meth Vs. Chef", a battle between Method Man and Raekwon over the rights to rap over RZA's beat; this track was left off the Wu-Tang Clan's debut album but surfaced on Method Man's debut, Tical (1994).

Group leader RZA produced Enter the Wu-Tang (36 Chambers) by creating sonic collages from classic soul samples and clips from martial arts movies Shaolin and Wu Tang (1983) and Ten Tigers from Kwangtung (1979). He complemented the rappers' performances with "lean, menacing beats that evoked their gritty, urban surroundings more effectively than their words," according to Stephen Thomas Erlewine of AllMusic. The use of soul samples and various esoteric clips, and the technique by which RZA employed them in his beats was unique and largely unprecedented in hip-hop. The gritty sound of Enter the Wu-Tang is due, at least in part, to the use of cheap equipment to produce the album.

== Music and lyrics ==
"C.R.E.A.M."
"C.R.E.A.M." features two verses from Raekwon and Inspectah Deck, who discuss their upbringings while living in New York City. It samples the Charmels' 1967 song "As Long As I've Got You".

"Method Man"
One of two songs to feature a single member of the group on the verses (Method Man)

According to music journalist Ben Yew, the minimalist means of production plays directly into the music's "street" aesthetic. "Because [RZA] didn't have the best mixing or recording equipment, the album is wrought with a 'dirty' quality—the drums have more bass and are more hard-hitting than they are crisp and clean; the samples have an eerie, almost haunting type of echo; and the vocals, because each member's voice is already aggressive and gritty, perfectly match the production." Although Ol' Dirty Bastard is given co-production credit on "Da Mystery of Chessboxin'" and Method Man is co-credited for "Wu-Tang Clan Ain't Nuthing ta F' Wit", critics and admirers universally credit RZA with developing what Pitchfork called a "dusty yet digital production style [that] helped legitimize the use of more diverse sample sources to the hardcore New York rap massive, breaking away from James Brown based beats and embracing a style that turned the Underdog theme into the menacing coda for a group of underground terrorists."

Enter the Wu-Tang ushered in a new standard for hip-hop at a time when hip-hop music was dominated by the jazz-influenced styles of A Tribe Called Quest (who coincidentally released their third studio album on the same day as Enter the Wu-Tang), the Afrocentric viewpoints of Public Enemy, and the rising popularity of West Coast gangsta rap. The album's explicit, humorous and free-associative lyrics have been credited for serving as a template for many subsequent hip-hop records. Rolling Stone described the album as possessing an aesthetic that was "low on hype and production values [and] high on the idea that indigence is a central part of blackness". While the lyrical content on Enter the Wu-Tang generally varies from rapper to rapper, the basic themes are the same—urban life, martial arts movies, comic book references, and marijuana—and the setting is invariably the harsh environment of New York City. AllMusic contributor Steve Huey praises the lyricists for their originality and caustic humor, stating "Some were outsized, theatrical personalities, others were cerebral storytellers and lyrical technicians, but each had his own distinctive style ... Every track on Enter the Wu-Tang is packed with fresh, inventive rhymes, which are filled with martial arts metaphors, pop culture references (everything from Voltron to Lucky Charms cereal commercials to Barbra Streisand's "The Way We Were"), bizarre threats of violence, and a truly twisted sense of humor."

With the exception of "Method Man" and GZA's "Clan in da Front", every song features multiple rappers contributing verses of varying lengths. The verses are essentially battle rhymes, mixed with humor and outsized tales of urban violence and drug use. There is some debate about whether the lyrics on 36 Chambers are properly classified as gangsta rap or something else entirely. In a Stylus magazine review, writer Gavin Mueller evokes the bleakness of the Wu-Tang world view:

The lyrics reach back to New York's own Rakim: dense battle rhymes potent with metaphors. Each Wu MC links his rhymes to crime and violence, allowing his preoccupations to surface subtly and indirectly, rather than spouting off overt gangsta-isms designed to shock ... The hood imagery of the lyrics is utterly pervasive and uncompromising, immersing the listener in a foreign land smack in the middle of New York. There is no celebration here, and little hope.

— Gavin Mueller

All nine original Wu-Tang Clan members contribute vocals on Enter the Wu-Tang. Masta Killa only appears on one track, contributing the last verse of "Da Mystery of Chessboxin'", but all the other rappers appear on at least two songs. Method Man and Raekwon are the most prolific of the group, featured on eight tracks. Though the performers have widely differing techniques, the chemistry between them is a key ingredient of the album's success. Pitchfork asserts that "Half the charm is in the cast's idiosyncrasies: ODB's hovering sing-song, Raekwon's fake stutter, Ghostface's verbal tics, Method Man's hazy, dusted voice."

== Title and packaging ==
Part of the album's title originates from the Five Percent philosophy, known to adherents as the Supreme Mathematics, which attaches the number 9 with the meaning "to bring into existence". Because the Wu-Tang Clan was made of nine members, each of whom has four chambers of the heart, the album was subtitled "36 Chambers", being the total of the nine hearts of the members.

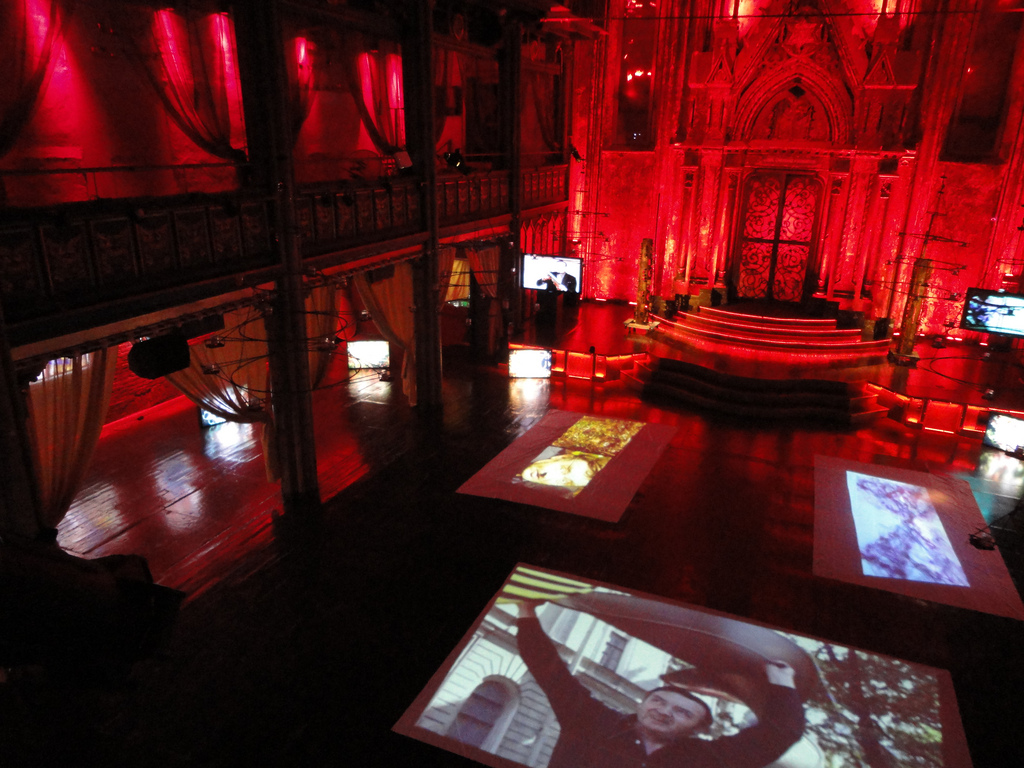
The interior of Angel Orensanz Center (pictured in 2010), where the album cover was shot.

In reference to the 1978 kung fu film The 36th Chamber of Shaolin that the group enjoyed watching, the Clan considered themselves as lyrical masters of the 36 chambers, and arrived onto the rap scene while appearing to be ahead, and more advanced over others, with "knowledge of 36 chambers of hip hop music when everyone else in hip hop was striving to attain the knowledge of 35 lessons". Also, while the human body has 108 pressure points (1 + 0 + 8 = 9), only the Wu-Tang martial artists learned and understood that 36 of those pressure points are deadly (9 + 36 = 45) (4 + 5 = 9). The lyrics and rhymes of the 9 members are to be considered as 36 deadly lyrical techniques for pressure points. All of this is the basis for the album title, Enter the Wu-Tang (36 Chambers), being that 9 members x 4 chambers = 36. However, this is just a theory; the true significance of the title is not definitively known. The first part of the title is taken from the 1973 film Enter the Dragon and aforementioned Shaolin and Wu Tang.

The album's front cover image was photographed by Daniel Hastings. It features only six members of the Wu-Tang Clan: RZA, GZA, Ol' Dirty Bastard, Inspectah Deck, Ghostface Killah, and Raekwon; member U-God was in jail for a parole violation at the time, while Method Man had been arrested earlier that day for marijuana possession. As not every member of the group was present for the shoot, the six members who were donned stocking masks to conceal their faces. The album cover photo was shot inside Angel Orensanz Center, then an abandoned and ruined synagogue. The group was photographed in front of a large foamcore rendering of the Wu-Tang Clan logo, on a set lit with tungsten lights, strobe lights, and candles. Hastings also took several photographs of the group under the Queensboro Bridge, which were featured in the album's packaging.

== Singles ==
"Protect Ya Neck"
The debut single is a posse cut produced by RZA, and features eight of the original Wu-Tang members; a sample of first two verses by Raekwon and Inspectah Deck.

"Protect Ya Neck" and "Tearz" were the first tracks recorded by the Wu-Tang Clan, released independently by the group as a 12-inch single in December 14, 1992. "Protect Ya Neck" is a free-associative and braggadocious battle rap featuring eight of the nine Wu-Tang Clan members. The track was also edited to scratch out all profanity, save for repeated use of the word "nigga". An uncensored version known as the "Bloody Version" was released on the 2004 compilation album, Legend of the Wu-Tang: Wu-Tang Clan's Greatest Hits. "Tearz" tells two stories: RZA's little brother getting shot and Ghostface Killah recounting the story of a man who contracts HIV after having unprotected sex. The singles were independently released as, "Protect Ya Neck"/"After the Laughter Comes Tears", which RZA financed by demanding $100 (USD) from each rapper who wanted a verse on the A-side. The single was re-released in a much larger pressing, with "Method Man" as the B-side.

"C.R.E.A.M.", featuring Raekwon and Inspectah Deck, was the second single from the album, and the first new A-side to be released after the group signed with Loud/RCA. The lyrics deal with the struggle of poverty, and the desire to earn money by any means. It was the Wu-Tang Clan's most successful single, reaching number 60 on the Billboard Hot 100 and number 8 on the Billboard Hot Rap Tracks chart. The single topped the Hot Dance Music/Maxi-Singles Sales chart. Wu-Tang's "Can It Be All So Simple", featuring Ghostface Killah and Raekwon, was the album's third single. The single failed to chart on the Billboard Hot 100 but reached number 24 on the Hot Rap Tracks chart in 1994. A remix of the song was included on Raekwon's debut solo album, Only Built 4 Cuban Linx... (1995).

Wu-Tang made music videos for the three A-sides and the B-side songs including "Method Man", "Da Mystery of Chessboxin'", and "Wu-Tang Clan Ain't Nuthing ta Fuck Wit". As the group's profile increased, the quality of their videos improved; though the "Protect Ya Neck" video resembled a home movie, later videos were directed by rising hip-hop music video director Hype Williams. The videos received almost no airplay on MTV but were extremely popular on video-by-request channels such as The Box. Touré wrote in his 1993 Rolling Stone review that, "in Brooklyn, N.Y., right now and extending back a few months, the reigning fave is the Wu-Tang Clan, who are to the channel what Guns N' Roses are to MTV."

== Critical reception ==
Contemporary professional reviews
Review scores
Source	Rating
Chicago Sun-Times	3/4 stars
Entertainment Weekly	A
Rolling Stone	4/5 stars
The Source	4.5/5 stars

Enter the Wu-Tang (36 Chambers) was received positively by contemporary critics. In an article for The Source, The Ghetto Communicator wrote "This record is harsh, but so is the world that we live in. For B-boys n'girls who come from the core of the hard, this is the hip-hop album you've been waiting for". Entertainment Weekly said, "With its rumble jumble of drumbeats, peppered with occasional piano plunking, Enter has a raw, pass-the-mike flavor we haven't heard since rap was pop's best-kept secret." Touré was less enthusiastic in Rolling Stone, praising the album's sound, but noting that "Wu-Tang ... are more ciphers than masterful creations. In refusing to commodify themselves, they leave blank the ultimate canvas—the self." He added, "This is hip-hop you won't find creeping up the Billboard charts but you will hear booming out of Jeep stereos in all the right neighborhoods." However, Enter the Wu-Tang had surprising chart success, despite its raw, underground sound. It peaked at number 41 on the Billboard 200 chart and reached number eight on Billboard's Top R&B/Hip-Hop Albums chart. The album continued to sell steadily and was eventually certified 4× platinum by the Recording Industry Association of America on November 10, 2025.

=== Retrospect ===
Retrospective professional reviews
Review scores
Source	Rating
AllMusic	5/5 stars
Christgau's Consumer Guide	A−
Consequence of Sound	A+
The Encyclopedia of Popular Music	4/5 stars
MusicHound R&B	5/5 stars
Pitchfork	10/10
The Rolling Stone Album Guide	5/5 stars
Spin Alternative Record Guide	8/10
XXL	5/5

Over time, Enter the Wu-Tang became one of the most highly regarded albums in hip-hop. The album was originally given a rating of 4.5 mics out of 5 in The Source magazine in 1994; however, it was given a classic 5 mic rating in a later issue of the magazine. Similar to The Source, XXL magazine gave the album a classic rating of "XXL" in its retrospective 2007 issue. In the book Spin Alternative Record Guide (1995), Enter the Wu-Tang (36 Chambers) has a critical rating of 8/10 from Spin. In 2003, Rolling Stone named the album among the "500 Greatest Albums of All Time", asserting that "East-coast hip-hop made a return in 1993." The magazine later listed it as one of the "Essential Albums of the 90s" and "100 Best Debut Albums of All Time." The Source cited Enter the Wu-Tang as one of the "100 Best Rap Albums", while also naming "Protect Ya Neck/Method Man" and "C.R.E.A.M." among the "100 Best Rap Singles". MTV declared it among "The Greatest Hip-Hop Albums of All Time", while Blender named the album among the "500 CDs You Must Own". Jon Caramanica, contributing author to Classic Material: The Hip-Hop Album Guide described it "as timeless an album as hip-hop has ever seen."

Publications based outside of the United States have acclaimed 36 Chambers as well; Australia's Juice magazine placed it at number 40 on its list of "100 Greatest Albums of the '90s", and Les Inrockuptibles ranked it number 59 on a list of "The 100 Best Albums 1986–1996". In naming Enter the Wu-Tang one of the 50 best albums of the 1990s, Pitchfork Media staff member Rollie Pemberton summed up the album's critical recognition by writing:

This is the sound of accidental fame. Something as unique and unusual as this record isn't supposed to find itself at the height of commercial viability; it's supposed to smolder underground, hidden from the view of mainstream America, who surely would not be ready for such a challenge. But America was ready, in part because this one challenged convention, not listeners. Sure, its sloppy drum programming, bizarre song structures, and unpolished sound quality disturbed commercial rap purists, but the talent was so inherent and obvious, and the charisma so undeniable, that it propelled the Wu-Tang Clan to the height of the rap game, and today stands not just as the hip-hop classic that introduced the concept of obscure thematic characters (each member's name references old kung-fu movies), but also bridged the gap between traditional old-school sensibilities and the technical lyricism of today.

In a retrospective review, Robert Christgau found the Wu-Tang Clan "grander" and "goofier" than their West Coast contemporaries and concluded, "Expect the masterwork this album's reputation suggests and you'll probably be disappointed—it will speak directly only to indigenous hip hoppers. Expect a glorious human mess, as opposed to the ominous platinum product of their opposite numbers, and you'll realize the dope game isn't everyone's dead-end street". In 2010, Enter the Wu-Tang (36 Chambers) was included in the book 1001 Albums You Must Hear Before You Die. In 2022, the album was selected by the Library of Congress for preservation in the National Recording Registry for being "culturally, historically, or aesthetically significant".

== Legacy and influence ==
=== East Coast hip-hop ===
Adam Heimlich of the New York Press considers the album a touchstone of hardcore hip-hop, a gritty, stripped-down, dark and violent subgenre of hip-hop and the signature sound of New York City's rap scene during the mid-1990s. He writes that "the Wu-Tang Clan ... all but invented 90s New York rap, back when the notion of an East Coast gangsta still meant Schoolly D or Kool G. Rap ... [They] designed the manner and style in which New York artists would address what Snoop and Dre had made rap's hottest topics: drugs and violence." As the album helped return New York City hip-hop to national prominence, a new generation of New York rappers, many of them inspired by the Wu-Tang Clan's example, released a flurry of classic albums that later became known as the East Coast Renaissance. Enter the Wu-Tang has been recognized by critics as a landmark album in the movement. AllMusic indicates that the success of the album paved the way for Nas, The Notorious B.I.G., Mobb Deep, and Jay-Z.

At the time of the album's release, mainstream hip-hop was dominated by the West Coast. Enter the Wu-Tang (along with Nas' critically acclaimed Illmatic and the commercial success of The Notorious B.I.G.'s Ready to Die) was able to shift the emphasis away from the melodious, synthesizer-driven G-funk and restore interest into the East Coast hip-hop scene. According to one columnist, "When Enter the Wu-Tang: The 36 Chambers first graced the pages of rap lore in 1993, Dr. Dre's funk-filled, West Coast gangster rap dominated the business. Though this initial dominance was difficult to overcome, Wu-Tang still managed to carve out a piece of rap history."

=== Hip-hop production ===
RZA's production on Enter the Wu-Tang had a profound and significant influence on subsequent hip-hop producers. The distinctive sound of Enter the Wu-Tang has been credited with creating a blueprint for hardcore hip-hop in the mid-1990s. Blackfilm.com asserts that Enter the Wu-Tang's production formula "transformed the sound of underground rap into mainstream formula, and virtually changed the face of contemporary music as popsters once knew it." Many successful rap producers have admitted to the influence of RZA's beats on their own production efforts. 9th Wonder, a producer and former member of Little Brother, is one of many whose vocal sampling styles are inspired by RZA. The album's reliance on soul music samples was novel at the time, but 21st-century producers such as The Alchemist, Kanye West, and Just Blaze now rely on this technique. According to Allmusic, the production on two Mobb Deep albums, The Infamous (1995) and Hell on Earth (1996), are "indebted" to RZA's early production with Wu-Tang Clan.

The album would come to preview further work fueled by both cinematic samples and inter-woven genres.

=== Subsequent Wu-Tang work ===
Following Enter the Wu-Tang's success, the individual members of the group negotiated and signed solo contracts with a variety of different labels: Method Man signed with Def Jam, Ol' Dirty Bastard with Elektra, GZA with Geffen Records, and Ghostface Killah with Epic Records. This expansion across the music industry was an element of RZA's stated plan for industry-wide domination, wherein "All Wu releases are deemed to be 50 percent partnerships with Wu-Tang Productions and each Wu member with solo deal must contribute 20 percent of their earnings back to Wu-Tang Productions, a fund for all Wu members".

On Enter the Wu-Tang's effect on the group and the music industry, the Milwaukee Journal's Aaron Justin-Szopinski wrote "The Wu showed us that a hip-hop group can control its own destiny in the tangled web of the industry. It owns publishing rights, controls its samples and has 90% influence over its career. And that control, that outlook for the future, is what makes it the best." Wu-Tang Clan have released seven subsequent group albums since Enter the Wu-Tang, including Wu-Tang Forever (1997), which is certified as a quadruple platinum record. None of the subsequent Wu-Tang Clan albums have garnered the critical accolades that their debut was accorded.

In 2013, the group reunited, at the behest of RZA, for an album and tour celebrating the 20th anniversary of the album's release. The album was titled A Better Tomorrow and the tour included dates throughout the United States, Europe, and Russia. All original members of the group who performed on Enter the Wu-Tang participated in both the tour and reunion album; Ol' Dirty Bastard was the exception, as he died in 2004.

== Accolades ==
Accolades for Enter the Wu-Tang (36 Chambers)
Publication	Country	Accolade	Year	Rank
Apple Music	United States	100 Best Albums	2024	37
Blender	United States	500 CDs You Must Own Before You Die	2003	*
Blender	United States	The 100 Greatest American Albums of All Time	2002	59
DJ Mag	UK	The Top 50 Most Influential Dance Albums Ever!	2006	38
Ego Trip	US	Hip Hop's Greatest Albums by Year 1980–1998	1999	1
The Guardian	UK	1000 Albums to Hear Before You Die	2007	*
Helsingin Sanomat	Finland	50th Anniversary of Rock	2004	*
Mojo	UK	The Greatest Albums of Our Lifetime: 100 Modern Classics	2006	62
Mojo	UK	Mojo 1000, the Ultimate CD Buyers Guide	2001	*
Mojo	UK	The Mojo Collection	2003	*
NME	UK	100 Best Albums of All Time	2003	82
NME	UK	The 500 Greatest Albums of All Time	2012	30
Nude as the News	US	The 100 Most Compelling Albums of the 90s	1999	61
Paul Morley	UK	Words and Music: A History of Pop in the Shape of a City	2003	*
Pitchfork	US	Top 100 Favorite Records of the 1990s	2003	36
Q	UK	90 Best Albums of the 1990s	1999	*
Q	UK	100 Best Albums of the '90s	2015	45
Record Collector	UK	Classic Albums from 21 Genres for the 21st Century	2000	*
Robert Dimery	US	1001 Albums You Must Hear Before You Die	2005	*
Rolling Stone	US	The 500 Greatest Albums of All Time	2020	27
Rolling Stone	US	100 Best Albums of the 90s	2010	29
Rolling Stone	US	The Essential Recordings of the 90s	1999	*
Rolling Stone	Germany	The 500 Best Albums of All Time	2004	453
Spin	US	The 90 Greatest Albums of the 90s	1999	22
Spin	US	100 Greatest Albums (1985–2005)	2005	20
Tom Moon	US	1000 Recordings to Hear Before You Die	2008	*
The Source	US	The Source Magazine's 100 Best Rap Albums	1998	*
Uncut	UK	200 Greatest Albums of All Time	2016	160
Vibe	US	100 Essential Albums of the 20th Century	1999	*
Vibe	US	51 Essential Albums	2004	*
(*) designates lists that are unordered.

== Track listing ==
All tracks written by Wu-Tang Clan and produced by Prince Rakeem "The RZA", except where noted.

Enter the Wu-Tang (36 Chambers) – CD and streaming version
No.	Title	Performer(s)	Length
1.	"Bring da Ruckus"	Ghostface Killah; GZA; Inspectah Deck; Raekwon; RZA	4:10
2.	"Shame on a Nigga"	Method Man; Ol' Dirty Bastard; Raekwon	2:57
3.	"Clan in da Front"	GZA; RZA	4:33
4.	"Wu-Tang: 7th Chamber"	Ghostface Killah; GZA; Inspectah Deck; Method Man; Ol' Dirty Bastard; Raekwon; RZA	6:05
5.	": Can It Be All So Simple"; "Intermission; "	Ghostface Killah; Raekwon	6:53
6.	"Da Mystery of Chessboxin'" (co-produced by Ol' Dirty Bastard)	Ghostface Killah; Inspectah Deck; Masta Killa; Method Man; Ol' Dirty Bastard; Raekwon; U-God	4:48
7.	"Wu-Tang Clan Ain't Nuthing ta F' Wit" (co-produced by The Method Man)	Inspectah Deck; Method Man; RZA	3:36
8.	"C.R.E.A.M."	Inspectah Deck; Method Man; Raekwon	4:12
9.	"Method Man"	Ghostface Killah; GZA; Method Man; RZA	5:50
10.	"Protect Ya Neck"	Ghostface Killah; GZA; Inspectah Deck; Method Man; Ol' Dirty Bastard; Raekwon; RZA; U-God	4:52
11.	"Tearz"	Ghostface Killah; RZA	4:17
12.	": Wu-Tang: 7th Chamber - Part II"; "Conclusion; "	Ghostface Killah; GZA; Inspectah Deck; Method Man; Ol' Dirty Bastard; Raekwon; RZA	6:10
Total length:			58:24

International release
No.	Title	Performer(s)	Length
12.	"Wu-Tang: 7th Chamber - Part II"	Ghostface Killah; GZA; Inspectah Deck; Method Man; Ol' Dirty Bastard; Raekwon; RZA	5:08
13.	": Method Man (Remix) Skunk Mix"; "Conclusion; "	Method Man	3:12
Total length:			1:01:53

=== Vinyl and cassette ===
The vinyl and cassette track listing is slightly different from the CD and streaming version. The international cassette release also has the same tracks at the end of side two as the international CD.

Shaolin Sword
No.	Title	Length
1.	"Bring da Ruckus"	4:10
2.	"Shame on a Nigga"	2:57
3.	"Clan in da Front"	4:33
4.	"Wu-Tang: 7th Chamber"	6:05
5.	"Can It Be All So Simple"	4:46
6.	": Protect Ya Neck"; "Intermission; "	6:48
Total length:		29:19

Wu-Tang Sword
No.	Title	Length
7.	"Da Mystery of Chessboxin'"	4:48
8.	"Wu-Tang Clan Ain't Nuthing ta F' Wit"	3:36
9.	"C.R.E.A.M."	4:12
10.	"Method Man"	5:50
11.	"Tearz"	4:17
12.	": Wu-Tang: 7th Chamber - Part II"; "Conclusion; "	6:10
Total length:		28:53

== Personnel ==
Credits are adapted from the album's liner notes.

=== Wu-Tang Clan ===
Clan members are credited on the back of the album under the original spellings/incarnations of their stage names. Notably missing is Masta Killa, who did not join the group until the album was already in production.

- Prince Rakeem "The RZA" – production, mixing, arranging, programming
- The Method Man – co-production ("Wu-Tang Clan Ain't Nuthing ta F' Wit")
- U-God
- Rebel INS
- Shallah Raekwon
- Ghost Face Killer
- Ol' Dirty Bastard – co-production ("Da Mystery of Chessboxin'")
- The Genius "The GZA"

=== Additional personnel ===
- Ethan Ryman – engineering (all tracks except "Da Mystery of Chessboxin'")
- Carlos Bess – engineering ("Da Mystery of Chessboxin'")
- The 4th Disciple – scratches
- GLC, NYC – editing
- Chris Gehringer – mastering
- Robert Diggs – executive production
- Oli Grant – executive production, production supervising
- Mitchell Diggs – executive production, production supervising, Wu-Tang management
- Dennis Coles – executive production
- John Gibbons – production supervising, Wu-Tang management
- Theodore Michael – production supervising
- Mike McDonald – production supervising, Wu-Tang management
- John Hamilton – Wu-Tang management
- Jonathan Lugo – Wu-Tang management
- Vince Hamlin – Wu-Tang management
- Trevor William – A&R management
- Jacqueline Murphy – art direction
- Dan Hastings/Cartel – photography
- Amy Wenzler – design
- Richard Bravo/Cartel – set design

== Charts ==
=== Weekly charts ===
1993–1994 weekly chart performance for Enter the Wu-Tang (36 Chambers)
Chart (1993–1994)	Peak position
UK Albums (Official Charts)	83
US Billboard 200	41
US Top R&B/Hip-Hop Albums (Billboard)	8

2019–2026 weekly chart performance for Enter the Wu-Tang (36 Chambers)
Chart (2019–2026)	Peak position
Belgian Albums (Ultratop Flanders)	83
Belgian Albums (Ultratop Wallonia)	137
Japanese Albums (Oricon)	24
Japanese Dance & Soul Albums (Oricon)	1
Japanese Top Albums Sales (Billboard Japan)	24
Hungarian Physical Albums (MAHASZ)	16
Swiss Albums (Schweizer Hitparade)	57

=== Year-end charts ===
1994 year-end chart performance for Enter the Wu-Tang (36 Chambers)
Chart (1994)	Position
US Top R&B/Hip-Hop Albums (Billboard)	22

2002 year-end chart performance for Enter the Wu-Tang (36 Chambers)
Chart (2002)	Position
Canadian R&B Albums (Nielsen SoundScan)	182
Canadian Rap Albums (Nielsen SoundScan)	90

== Certifications ==
Certifications for Enter the Wu-Tang (36 Chambers)
Region	Certification	Certified units/sales
Australia (ARIA)	Platinum	70,000^{‡}
Canada (Music Canada)	3× Platinum	300,000^{‡}
Denmark (IFPI Danmark)	Gold	10,000^{‡}
Italy (FIMI)	Gold	25,000^{‡}
New Zealand (RMNZ)	Platinum	15,000^{‡}
United Kingdom (BPI)	Platinum	300,000^{‡}
United States (RIAA)	4× Platinum	4,000,000^{‡}
^{‡} Sales+streaming figures based on certification alone.

== See also ==
- Album era
