= Shimmy Shimmy Ya =

Single by Ol' Dirty Bastard

from the album Return to the 36 Chambers: The Dirty Version
- B-side: "Baby C'mon"
- Released: May 9, 1995
- Recorded: 1994
- Genre: Hardcore hip hop; comedy hip hop
- Length: 2:41
- Label: Elektra
- Songwriters: Robert Diggs; Russell Jones
- Producer: RZA

Ol' Dirty Bastard singles chronology
"Brooklyn Zoo" (1995)	"Shimmy Shimmy Ya" (1995)	"Woo-Hah!! Got You All in Check (The World Wide Remix)" (1996)

"Shimmy Shimmy Ya" is the second single by Ol' Dirty Bastard, from the album Return to the 36 Chambers: The Dirty Version (1995). It was produced by fellow Wu-Tang Clan member RZA. The song was ranked number 59 on VH1's 100 Greatest Songs of Hip Hop.

== Music video ==
A music video was created for the song, directed by Hype Williams. The video shows a depiction of the 1970s, in which large afros and platform shoes were commonly considered fashionable.

== Track listing ==
12" promo

1. "Shimmy Shimmy Ya" (Extended Version Clean) – 3:38
2. "Shimmy Shimmy Ya" (Extended Instrumental) – 3:39
3. "Shimmy Shimmy Ya" (Clean) – 2:42
4. "Baby C'mon" (Clean) – 3:38
5. "Brooklyn Zoo" (Clean Lord Digga Remix) – 3:55
6. "Give It To Ya Raw" – 4:08

12" remix promo

1. "Shimmy Shimmy Ya" (Remix) – 4:10
2. "Shimmy Shimmy Ya" (Remix) (Instrumental) – 4:10

12" and CD single

1. "Shimmy Shimmy Ya" (Extended Version) – 3:48
2. "Shimmy Shimmy Ya" – 2:46
3. "Baby C'mon" – 3:38
4. "Shimmy Shimmy Ya" (Extended Instrumental) – 3:38
5. "Baby C'mon" (Instrumental) – 3:40
6. "Shimmy Shimmy Ya" (Extended Acappella) – 3:27

CD promo and cassette single

1. "Shimmy Shimmy Ya" (Extended Version Clean) – 3:40
2. "Shimmy Shimmy Ya" (Clean) – 2:43

Studio Tōn remix promo

1. "Shimmy Shimmy Ya" (Studio Ton Mix) (featuring MC Eiht & E-40) – 4:10

== Charts ==
Chart (1995)	Peak position
US Billboard Hot 100	62
US Dance Singles Sales (Billboard)	4
US Hot R&B/Hip-Hop Songs (Billboard)	47
US Hot Rap Songs (Billboard)	9

== Certifications ==
Region	Certification	Certified units/sales
United Kingdom (BPI)	Silver	200,000^{‡}
^{‡} Sales+streaming figures based on certification alone.

== Samples ==
The opening piano riff is a sample of the opening notes of the Stevie Wonder song "Knocks Me Off My Feet", from his landmark album Songs in the Key of Life.
