= Brooklyn Zoo (song) =

Single by Ol' Dirty Bastard

from the album Return to the 36 Chambers: The Dirty Version
- Released: January 21, 1995
- Recorded: 1993
- Genre: East Coast hip hop; hardcore hip hop
- Length: 3:40
- Label: Elektra
- Songwriter: Russell Jones
- Producers: True Master; Ol' Dirty Bastard

Ol' Dirty Bastard singles chronology
"Show & Prove" (1994)	"Brooklyn Zoo" (1995)	"Shimmy Shimmy Ya" (1995)

Music video
- "Brooklyn Zoo" on YouTube

"Brooklyn Zoo" is the debut single by American hip hop artist Ol' Dirty Bastard from the album Return to the 36 Chambers: The Dirty Version (1995). Ol' Dirty Bastard was the second member of the Wu-Tang Clan to release a solo effort, behind Method Man. "Brooklyn Zoo" is Ol' Dirty Bastard's second highest charting single, behind "Got Your Money".

== Composition and lyrics ==
The song is composed of an intro followed by a single long verse and finishes with a repeated hook, "Shame on you when you step through to the Ol' Dirty Bastard, Brooklyn Zoo!" This line is an interpolation of another Ol' Dirty Bastard line from the song "Protect Ya Neck" by the Wu-Tang Clan from the album Enter The Wu-Tang (36 Chambers) ("Shame on you, when you step through to the Ol' Dirty Bastard, straight from the Brooklyn Zoo").

The song's lyrics take the form of a tirade against an unnamed adversary.

About halfway through the song a line is repeated in a crescendo which builds to a scream ("By a nigga, who couldn't figure").

== Origin ==
Part of the first verse had been used in freestyles previously.

The name "Brooklyn Zoo" refers to the zoological park in Brooklyn's Prospect Park.

The name also refers to the group Brooklyn Zu, who were closely affiliated with Ol' Dirty Bastard. In the bonus DVD of Message to the Other Side, Brooklyn Zu member Buddha Monk explains that Russell Jones a.k.a. Ol' Dirty Bastard and the members of Brooklyn Zu were having an aggressive argument for unknown reasons. During the argument, Jones walked into the sound booth and started recording a track using the energy and anger from the argument to inspire his lyrics. Buddha Monk also claims Jones used some words and sentences used in the argument to create the track.

== Music video ==
Two different videos were made for the song.

The first version features a movie with subtitles. Pimp Daddy (played by Ol' Dirty Bastard) comes back from prison and returns to Rikers Island with his lady, only to get a rude calling when one of his friends gets involved with a deal. It then cuts back to Chinatown where a local Asian-American attempts to sell fireworks near the Brooklyn Bridge. He gets involved with a gang leader and pays for it by getting incinerated in his car's trunk by his own fireworks. Then Pimp Daddy with his lady go to an abandoned arcade only to be set up, and both him and his lady getting shot. This version was aired in some markets, but for the most part was rejected by various cable networks at the time due to its subject matter.

The second version has Ol' Dirty Bastard loitering in the hallways of a dank apartment building, lip-synching to the song while surrounded by various members of the Wu-Tang Clan, including his cousins RZA and GZA and fellow members Raekwon, Method Man and Cappadonna. In one scene, Ol' Dirty Bastard picks his nose and wipes his finger on the wall. This version of the video received the most airplay.

== Charts ==
Chart (1995)	Peak position
US Billboard Hot 100	54
US Dance Singles Sales (Billboard)	5
US Hot R&B/Hip-Hop Songs (Billboard)	40
US Hot Rap Songs (Billboard)	5

== Track listing ==
- Promotional 12" single

A-side

1. "Brooklyn Zoo (LP Version)" – 3:51
2. "Brooklyn Zoo (Lord Digga Remix)" – 3:55
3. "Brooklyn Zoo (LP Instrumental)" – 3:46

B-side

1. "Give It To Ya Raw (LP Version)" – 4:03
2. "Give It To Ya Raw (SD50 Remix)" – 4:08
3. "Brooklyn Zoo (Lord Digga Remix Instrumental)" – 4:00
- Promotional CD single
1. "Brooklyn Zoo (Clean LP Version)" – 3:49
2. "Brooklyn Zoo (Clean Lord Digga Remix)" – 3:55
- Cassette single

A-side

1. "Brooklyn Zoo (Clean LP Version)" – 3:49

B-side

1. "Brooklyn Zoo (Clean Lord Digga Remix)" – 3:55
