= Sav Killz =

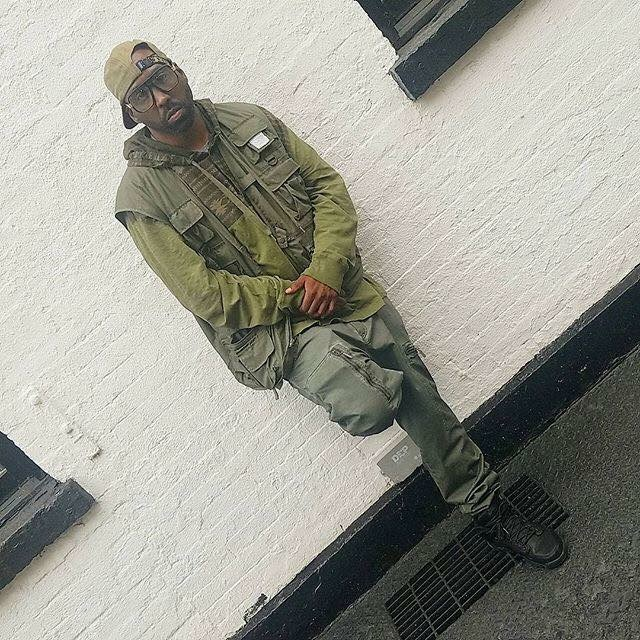
- Sav Killz in 2017 taken by Ricky Powell

Background information
- Also known as: Jamel Rockwell
- Born: Jamel Hampton; January 15, 1978 (age 48); Flatbush, Brooklyn, New York U.S.
- Origin: Bedford–Stuyvesant, Brooklyn, New York U.S.
- Genres: East Coast hip-hop
- Occupations: Rapper; lyricist
- Instruments: Rapping; Mixing; Producing
- Years active: 2005–present
- Labels: Fork and Spoon Records; Hardtimes Records; All Elements / Fork and Spoon
- Website: SavKillz.com

Sav Killz aka Jamel Hampton (born January 15, 1978) is a Brooklyn, New York-based emcee, rapper and lyricist. He is part of the hip hop underground in New York City.

== Early life ==
Hampton was born and raised in the Flatbush neighborhood of Brooklyn, New York. As a musician, he grew up in and was influenced by the Bedford–Stuyvesant neighborhood of Brooklyn. Hampton was raised by his grandmother.

== Career ==
Hampton got his start as a graffiti writer in New York City, known for his tag, "Savage." As early as 1997 when he was young, he got started on the block, rapping. One of his early MC names was Savage Killa, based on his graffiti handle, and which he later shortened to Sav Killz.

Hampton was part of the early "Bed-Stuy, Do or Die!"-era of Brooklyn music. He got his start as part of the Wu-Tang Clan cypher and was connected to Popa Wu, learning how to rap at 36 Chambers Studio and Restoration Plaza. He was also part of the Sunz of Man and Brooklyn Zu cyphers.

Hampton performed at many open mic events, including End of the Week at the Pyramid, Nuyorican Poets Café, Club Speed, and Bowery Poetry Club among others. During this time, Hampton worked in the underground scene with fellow artists like Stronghold Crew, Immortal Technique, Shabaam Sahdeeq, C Rayz Walz, Loer Velocity and others.

Hampton's first record was 2006's Determination Through Time. Throughout the mid-2005 to 2006 era, he came up as emcee during that time period.

Hampton said that since 2010, he has been able to work full time on his music.

Hampton specializes in mixtape collections distributed through independent rap channels, including selling the CDs on the street. He estimates that he has sold 50,000 to 60,000 CDs since 2006, with the help of Fat Beats and Underground Hip Hop distribution.

Hampton adapted the alias Jamel Rockwell for his 2012 record, Bangers & B-Sides, for a song that was highly autobiographical.

His song, "Steadfast," from 2015's Immovable Kings, was part of the soundtrack of The New York Times video feature series, "Block by Block," on Bedford–Stuy.

Hampton has performed on stage with and as an opener for many artists including Kool Keith, Jadakiss, Slick Rick, Saigon, AZ, The Beatnuts, Rakim, Foxy Brown.

== All Elements ==
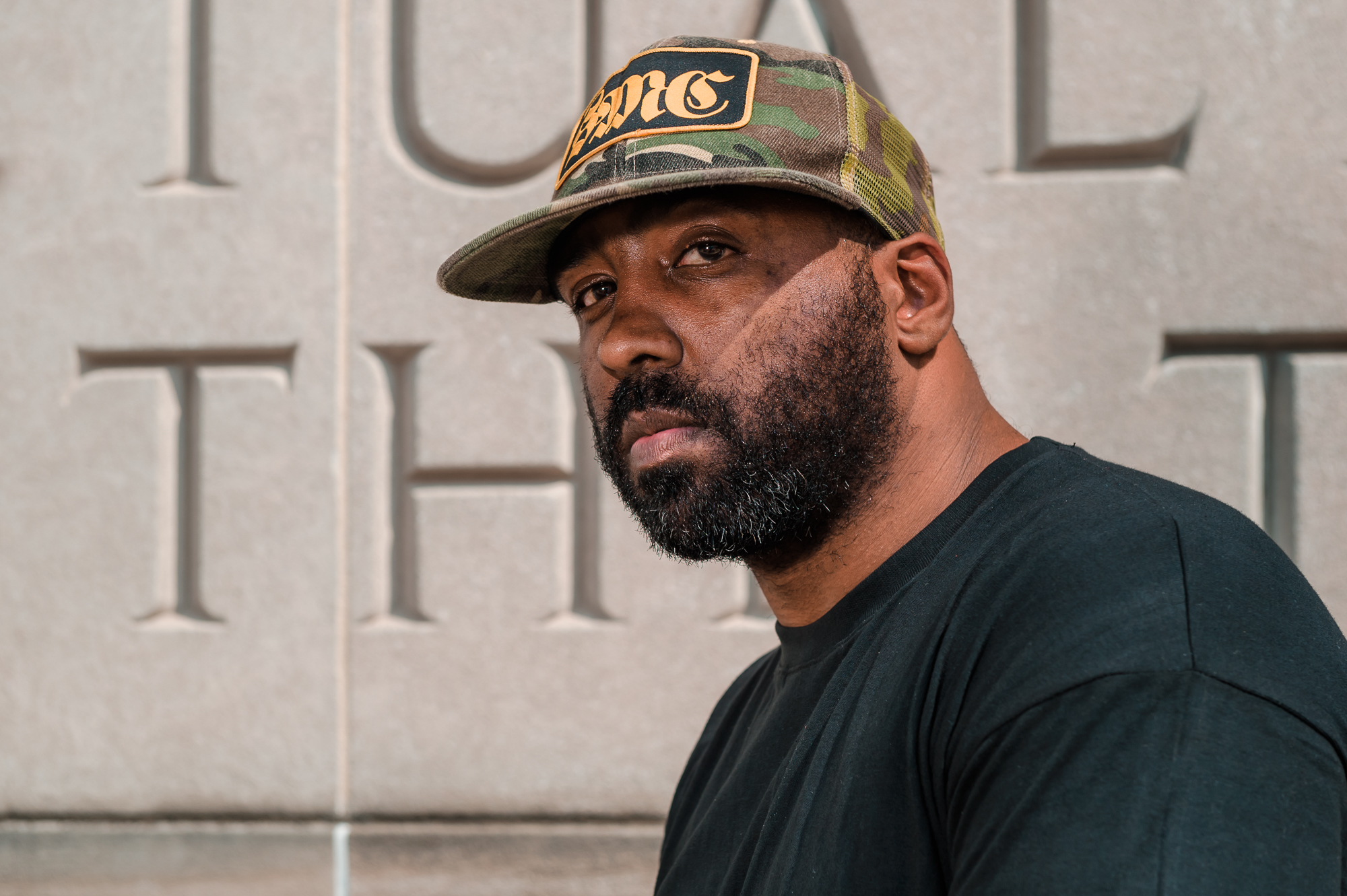
SAV KILLZ

In 2004, Hampton met DJ J-Ronin through a friend, 9th Prince from Killarmy. J-Ronin created a community called the All Elements aka The Elemental Cartel, which later turned into a record label. From the early 2000s, DJ J-Ronin and Hampton have run the multimedia company All Elements and record label, All Elements Music Group, as partners and co-CEO. Through All Elements, Ronin also manages Sav Killz.

All Elements has chapters all over the world. All Elements also has a weekly radio station.

== Personal life ==
Hampton is a member of the Nation of Gods and Earths cultural movement. He said he was introduced to the movement, which was a huge part of the community growing up, through a mentor, Born Supreme. Born Supreme also connected Hampton to Popa Wu.

== Discography ==
=== Releases ===
- 2006: Determination Through Time – Collection of works featuring Killah Priest, RZA, Bronze Nazareth, Kevlaar 7, Breez Evah Flowin, Loer Velocity, and more
- 2008: Success is Inevitable (Hardtimes Records) – Mixedtape hosted by DJ J-Ronin featuring Sean Price, Ali Vegas, Capadonna, Planet Asia, Steele of Smif-N-Wessun, C Rayz Walz, Nina B, Shabaam Sahdeeq, Teflon of M.O.P., Famoso, and more
- 2009: Scratchin the Surface (All Elements Music Group) – Mixedtape hosted by DJ Superstar Jay and DJ J-Ronin mixed by DJ Snips featuring Skyzoo, Sha Stimuli, Donny Goines, Esso, Big Lou, Hell Razah, Vast Aire of Cannibal Ox, Planet Asia, Guilty Simpson, Iron Braydz, Louie Gonz, and more
- 2012: Bangers and B-Sides (All Elements) – Mixedtape hosted by DJ J-Ronin featuring Jadakiss, M.O.P. Cappadonna, Math Hoffa, Ill Bil, Ruste Juxx, La The Darkman, and more
- 2012: Determination Through Time (A Collection of Works) (All Elements / Fork and Spoon) – re-release of 2006 record
- 2015: Immovable Kings EP (Fork and Spoon Records) – Mixedtape featuring Planet Asia, Math Hoffa, Ruste Juxx, Reef The Lost Cauze, Illa Ghee, Poison Pen, Creature with production by Audible Doctor, Cee the Architek, Vokab, Young Cee, Bazooka Joe and Crummie Beats
- 2016: Bangers and B-Sides 2 (All Elements) – Mixedtape hosted by DJ J-Ronin featuring Tragedy Khadafi, Planet Asia, Frank Knight, Cappadonna of Wu-Tang Clan
- 2017: Still Determined (All Elements) – Upcoming release

==== Gold Chain Military ====
Gold Chain Military is a collective made up of Planet Asia, Killer Ben, TriState, Turbin, Killa Kali, Sav Killz, Montage One. The collective incorporates rappers from both the east and west coast of the United States.

- 2009: Gold Chain Military with Planet Asia, Post War Mixtape 2009 hosted by DJ J-Ronin (Gold Chain Military) – Mixedtape produced by Alchemist, Large Pro, Evidence, DJ Babu, Thayod, and more

=== Collaborations ===
- 2006: Planet Asia, The Sickness: Part 1 – "Baby Food" featuring Sav Skills, Tri State
- 2007: The Wisemen, Wisemen Approaching (Babygrande Records) – "Streets is My Home" (street album)
- 2008: Ali Vegas, Transition to Power Hosted By Superstar Jay – "Fresh Gutta" featuring Sav Killz
- 2009: Endemic, Terminal Illness (Caroline Distribution Record Store Day Sampler - April 18, 2009) – "Comin To Kill" featuring Sean Price, Ruste Juxx, Sav Killz
- 2010: Big Lou, Goya Product With a Twist of Soul Food (Coast 2 Coast Mixtapes) – "Cipher Bullies" featuring Math Hoffa, Sav Killz
- 2010: Ruste Juxx, Adamantine (Duck Down) – "Rap Assassins" featuring Ill Bill, Sav Kills, Cyrus Malachi
- 2010: 9th Prince, One Man Army (Babygrande Records) – "Assassins" featuring Sav Killz, Dasha
- 2010: Iron Braydz, Devil May Cry – "Savin Artillery" featuring Guilty Simpson, Sav Killz
- 2011: DJ JS-1, Ground Original 3: Nobody Cares (Fat Beats Records) – "Real Speak" featuring Sav Killz, Steven King, L.I.F.E. Long
- 2011: V/A, Terminal 3 Presents The Academy (Terminal 3 Production) – "Rich Righteous Teachers" featuring Jadakiss, La The Darkman, Sav Killz, Billy Danze of M.O.P.
- 2011: Lewis Parker, Dangerous Adventures (KingUnderground Records) – "Murder One" featuring Eastkoast, Vast Aire, T.R.A.C., Sav Kills, Baron and "Big Impact" featuring Sav Kills, Killa Sha, John Robinson, T.R.A.C.
- 2012: JP Beats, The Warning – "Bong!" featuring Kurupt, Math Hoffa, Sav Killz, King Marvey X, Slee 57, Khosi
- 2012: Ras Kass, The Barmageddon Mixtape – "Dreadnoks" featuring Shabaam Sahdeeq
- 2012: Snowgoons, Snowgoons Dynasty (Babygrande Records) – “The Legacy” featuring Esoteric, Ill Bill, Godilla, Fredro Starr, Sicknature, Punchline, REKS, Thirstin Howl the 3rd, Planetary, Virtuoso, Maylay Sparks, Swann, Sav Killz, M-Dot, Reef the Lost Cauze
- 2012: V/A & DJ Doo Wop, UnderGround: The New 90's (238 Beats) – “Retrospect”
- 2013: Cappadonna, Eyrth, Wynd & Fyre/Love, Anger & Emotion (RBC Records) – “Welfare” and “Actual Facts”
- 2013: Endemic, Terminal Illness Part 2 – “Calisthenics” featuring Tragedy Khadafi, Sav Killz, Bugsy
- 2013: C-Rayz Walz, ALMIGHTY: The Solar Facts Part 2 – “Eagle's Claw” featuring Godilla Jaguar Paw, Afu-Ra, Sav Killz, MyGrane McNastee, East Koast Lord Life, Swave Sevah, Iron Butterfly and "The Saga (PTG3)" featuring Formaldahyde Dankenstein, Subtex, Sav Killz
- 2013: Gensu Dean & Planet Asia, Abrasions (Mello Music Group) – "Thyself" featuring David Banner, Tragedy Khadafi
- 2013: Creature, Black Lagoon Radio (Coffee Grind Media) – "My Brudda Brudda" featuring Nutso, Sav Killz; produced by Omega One
- 2014: The Society Of Invisibles Presents 2Ugli, Poor Quality 2 (Johnny23 Records) – "Dead Man Walking" featuring C-Rayz Walz, Lex Starwind, Sav Killz
- 2014: DJ JS-1, Ground Original 4: It Is What It Isn't (Ground Original) – "Infinite" featuring Ruste Juxx, Sav Killz
- 2015: Dom Pachino, War Poetry – "9 Henchmen" featuring Bronze Nazareth, Shyheim, Bugsy Da God, Shogun, Timbo King, Sav Killz, Dro Pesci, C-Rayz Walz
- 2015: Knightstalker & Falling Down, Kept In Perspective II – "Demolition Squad" featuring Sav Killz, Dark Skinned Assassin
- 2016: Phalo Pantoja & Eastkoas, Merciless Beauty – "Freedom"

== Videos ==
- 2007: Sav Killz, "Champion Rap" featuring Planet Asia
- 2008: Loer Velocity Ready for a Renaissance (Embedded Music) – "Centrifugal Cyphers" featuring Sav Killz
- 2010: Louie Gonz, "Elemental Cartel" featuring Sav Killz, J.Arch, Louie Gonz, Iron Braydz, M9
- 2010: Ruste Juxx, "Rap Assassins" featuring Ill Bill, Sav Killz, Cyrus Malachi
- 2010: Sav Killz, "Danger"
- 2010: Sav Killz, "God Like"
- 2010: Sav Killz, "Scratchin The Surface"
- 2010: Sav Killz, "Tarnish Ya Rep" featuring Tristate
- 2010: Sav Killz, "We Don't Look to the Skies"
- 2011: Sav Killz, "Look What I Become" featuring Verse
- 2013: Endemic, Terminal Illness Part 2 – “Calisthenics” featuring Tragedy Khadafi, Sav Killz, Bugsy da God
- 2016: Sav Killz, Immovable Kings (All Elements) – "Dreadnoks 2 / Onslaught" featuring Math Hoffa
- 2016: Sav Killz, Bangers and B-Sides (All Elements) – "Fearless"

== See also ==
- List of Wu-Tang Clan affiliates
- Indie hip-hop
