= Wu-Tang Meets the Indie Culture =

Dreddy Krueger Presents... Think Differently Music: Wu-Tang Meets the Indie Culture
- The Wu-Tang Clan logo parodies the Apple Inc.'s "Think different" logo.

Compilation album by Wu-Tang Clan and various artists
- Released: October 18, 2005
- Studios: 36 Chambers Studio (New York, NY)
- Genre: Hip-hop
- Length: 53:16
- Labels: Think Differently Music; Babygrande
- Producers: Bronze Nazareth; DJ Noize; Fred Ones; Mathematics; Preservation; RZA

Wu-Tang Clan and various artists chronology
Legend of the Wu-Tang: Wu-Tang Clan's Greatest Hits (2004)	Dreddy Krueger Presents... Think Differently Music: Wu-Tang Meets the Indie Culture (2005)	Mathematics Presents Wu-Tang Clan & Friends Unreleased (2007)

Singles from Dreddy Krueger Presents... Think Differently Music: Wu-Tang Meets the Indie Culture
- 1. "Biochemical Equation / Preservation" Released: 2005; 2. "Lyrical Swords / Think Differently" Released: 2006

Professional ratings
Review scores
Source	Rating
AllMusic	4/5 stars
Pitchfork	6.9/10
PopMatters	6/10
RapReviews	7/10
The Harvard Crimson	4/5
The Village Voice	B+

Dreddy Krueger Presents... Think Differently Music: Wu-Tang Meets the Indie Culture is a compilation album by American hip-hop collective Wu-Tang Clan and its affiliates. It was released on October 18, 2005, via Think Differently Music Group and Babygrande Records. Presented and executively produced by Dreddy Krueger, the main production was handled by Bronze Nazareth, Preservation, Allah Mathematics, DJ Noize, Fred Ones and RZA. It features contributions from several fellow independent hip-hop musicians, such as Byata, Del the Funky Homosapien, Ras Kass, Aesop Rock, Casual, C-Rayz Walz, Littles, MF Doom, Planet Asia, R.A. the Rugged Man, Roc Marciano, Sean Price, Sir Menelik, Tragedy Khadafi, Vast Aire and Vordul Mega among others, as well as narrations by Jim Jarmusch. The album was supported with two singles: "Biochemical Equation" b/w "Preservation" and "Lyrical Swords" b/w "Think Differently". Despite being a compilation album, "Wu-Tang Meets the Indie Culture" has been considered by many fans to be one of the group's best works, with the collaborations receiving acclaim.

The Instrumentals version of the album was released on April 14, 2009. The Lost Files version was released on July 15, 2009, combining songs and beats recorded around 2005 and 2006 for Wu-Tang Meets the Indie Culture but were left off. The official follow-up album to Wu-Tang Meets the Indie Culture entitled Dreddy Kruger Presents... Think Differently Two: The Audio Film was released on February 7, 2020.

== Track listing ==
No.	Title	Producer(s)	Length
1.	"Introduction" (performed by Dreddy Krueger)	Bronze Nazareth	1:12
2.	"Lyrical Swords" (performed by GZA and Ras Kass)	Bronze Nazareth	3:25
3.	"Slow Blues" (performed by Vast Aire, Byata, Timbo King and Prodigal Sunn)	Bronze Nazareth	4:49
4.	"Still Grimy" (performed by U-God, Sean Price, Prodigal Sunn and C-Rayz Walz)	Preservation	4:15
5.	"Skit"		0:32
6.	"Think Differently" (performed by Casual, Tragedy Khadafi, Roc Marciano and Vordul Mega)	Bronze Nazareth	4:33
7.	"Informercial #1" (performed by Jim Jarmusch)		0:38
8.	"Biochemical Equation" (performed by RZA and MF Doom)	RZA	3:56
9.	"O.D.B. Tribute" (performed by DJ Noize)	Bronze Nazareth	1:51
10.	"Fragments" (performed by Del the Funky Homosapien)	Bronze Nazareth	3:31
11.	"Intermission"	Fred Ones	0:27
12.	"Street Corners" (performed by Bronze Nazareth, Solomon Childs and Byata)	Bronze Nazareth	3:17
13.	"Listen" (performed by Littles, Khalid and Planet Asia)	Bronze Nazareth	3:40
14.	"Infomercial #2" (performed by Jim Jarmusch)		0:45
15.	"Verses" (performed by Scaramanga Shallah, La the Darkman, Ras Kass and GZA)	DJ Noize	4:33
16.	"Preservation" (performed by Aesop Rock and Del the Funky Homosapien)	Preservation	2:26
17.	"Cars on the Interstate..." (performed by C.C.F. Division)	Allah Mathematics	2:17
18.	"Give It Up" (performed by J-Live and R.A. the Rugged Man)	Preservation	3:46
19.	"Black Dawn" (performed by Bronze Nazareth)	Bronze Nazareth	3:23
Total length:			53:16

Vinyl bonus track
No.	Title	Length
20.	"O" (performed by Jim Jarmusch)

== Personnel ==
- James "Dreddy Kruger" Dockery – vocals (track 1), arrangement, sequencer, executive producer, A&R, liner notes
- Gary "GZA" Grice – vocals (tracks: 2, 15)
- John "Ras Kass" Austin – vocals (tracks: 2, 15)
- Theodore "Vast Aire" Arrington II – vocals (track 3)
- Beatrice "Byata" Dikker – vocals (tracks: 3, 12)
- Timothy "Timbo King" Drayton – vocals (track 3)
- Lamar "Prodigal Sunn" Ruff – vocals (tracks: 3, 4)
- Lamont "U-God" Hawkins – vocals (track 4)
- Sean Price – vocals (track 4)
- Waleed "C-Rayz Walz" Shabazz – vocals (track 4)
- Jonathan "Casual" Owens – vocals (track 6)
- Percy Lee "Tragedy Khadafi" Chapman – vocals (track 6)
- Rahkeim "Roc Marciano" Meyer – vocals (track 6)
- Shamar "Vordul Mega" Gardner – vocals (track 6)
- Jim Jarmusch – voice (tracks: 7, 14, 20)
- Robert "RZA" Diggs – vocals & producer (track 8), supervisor
- Daniel "MF Doom" Dumile – vocals (track 8)
- Kim "DJ Noize" Sæther – scratches (track 9), producer (track 15)
- Teren "Del the Funky Homosapien" Jones – vocals (tracks: 10, 16)
- Justin "Bronze Nazareth" Cross – vocals (tracks: 12, 19), producer (tracks: 1–3, 6, 9, 10, 12, 13, 19)
- Walbert "Solomon Childs" Dale – vocals (track 12)
- Alfredo "Littles" Bryan – vocals (track 13)
- Khalid – vocals (track 13)
- Jason "Planet Asia" Green – vocals (track 13)
- Phillip "Sir Menelik"/"Scaramanga Shallah" Collington – vocals (track 15)
- Làson "La the Darkman" Jackson – vocals (track 15)
- Ian "Aesop Rock" Bavitz – vocals (track 16)
- Shaleek "Shacronz" Drayton – vocals (track 17)
- Freedom "Free Murda" Drayton – vocals (track 17)
- Jean-Jacques "J-Live" Cadet – vocals (track 18)
- Richard Andrew "R.A. the Rugged Man" Thorburn – vocals (track 18)
- Jean "DJ Preservation" Daval – producer (tracks: 4, 16, 18), background music (tracks: 7, 14)
- Fred "Fred Ones" Sepulveda – producer (track 11)
- Ronald "Mathematics" Bean – producer (track 17)
- Jose "Choco" Reynoso – mixing
- Emily Lazar – mastering
- Chuck Wilson – co-executive producer
- Nubian Image – cover artwork, layout
- DJ City Rich – photography
