= Majors (band) =

Majors is a Danish hip-hop group consisting of MCs Nat Ill, J-Spliff, Negash Ali and the disc jockeys DJ Static (former DMC World DJ Championship winner) and DJ Noize. The five members first came together in the City Hall studio in Århus in 2007 to start recording. On 28 April 2008 they released their self-titled debut album, which has been called "the best English-language hip-hop album made in Denmark".

== Discography ==
- Majors (2008)
