= Smuggling Booze in the Graveyard =

Studio album by Warcloud
- Released: 2002; 2006 (reissue)
- Genre: Hip-hop
- Label: Skarekrow Music; ChamberMusik SP (reissue)
- Producer: 4th Disciple; Cilvaringz; RZA; ShoGun Assasson; The Skarekrow

Warcloud chronology
Nightmares That Surface from Shallow Sleep (2002)	Smuggling Booze in the Graveyard (2002)	Blue Sky Black Death Presents: The Holocaust (2006)

Smuggling Booze in the Graveyard is an album by American rapper and Wu-Tang Clan affiliate Warcloud, originally released in 2002 as a CD-R by the Skarekrow Music label. It was remastered and reissued in 2006 with an exclusive bonus track.

Production was handled largely by The Skarekrow, with two beats each by Wu-Tang Clan's RZA and Wu-Tang affiliate Cilvaringz, and one each from affiliates 4th Disciple and ShoGun Assason. Guest vocal appearances were made by Wu-Tang affiliates Black Knights and ShoGun Assason, as well as by JulesUnique, Vulgar, The Skarekrow and Soul Brady. The bonus track on the reissued version, "Bloodline", also featured appearances by Leviathan and Black Sun (a.k.a. Onslawt).

== Track listing ==
1. "Intro Dark Choozer: Grave Roller Coaster Tycoon (One Standard Lesson)"
  - Featuring JulesUnique
  - Produced by The Skarekrow
2. "Smuggling Booze in the Graveyard"
  - Featuring JulesUnique
  - Produced by The Skarekrow
3. "The Trap Door"
  - Featuring JulesUnique
  - Produced by The RZA
4. "Castle Freak of Bone Romania"
  - Produced by The Skarekrow
5. "The Mighty King of Swords"
  - Produced by 4th Disciple
6. "The Last Hovering Castle"
  - Produced by Cilvaringz
7. "Battleship Starship Warcloud Shake'spear Cliff"
  - Featuring JulesUnique
  - Produced by The Skarekrow
8. "9 Days of Wine & Roses"
  - Produced by The Skarekrow
9. "Shuffle Heavy Gun-Powder-Keg"
  - Featuring the professional
  - Produced by The Skarekrow
10. "Lost Soldier of Wu-Tang"
  - Produced by The RZA
11. "Raw Head Spear Howling Wolves/Royal Rumble"
  - Featuring Black Knights & ShoGun Assason
  - Produced by ShoGun Assason
12. "Vampire Kung-Fu"
  - Produced by The Skarekrow
13. "Sleepwalker Drive-In Theatre"
  - Featuring Vulgar & The Skarekrow
  - Produced by The Skarekrow
14. "MoJo-oodoov: The Dead Man & His Stepson"
  - Produced by The Skarekrow
15. "On the High Side of the Sky"
  - Featuring Soul Brady
  - Produced by The Skarekrow
16. "Angry Men from the Graveyard"
  - Featuring The Skarekrow & Vulgar
  - Produced by The Skarekrow
17. "Weapon Factory Outro: Gun-Low-Stance"
  - Produced by Cilvaringz
18. "Bloodline" (bonus)
  - Featuring Leviathan and Black Sun a.k.a. Onslawt
  - Produced by The Skarekrow
