= I (Cilvaringz album) =

Studio album by Cilvaringz
- Released: 12 June 2007
- Genre: Hip hop
- Label: RPEG Ltd, Babygrande Records, TopNotch, Entak Japan, Nocturne France, Universal Music Group
- Producer: RZA, Mathematics, Bronze Nazareth, True Master, 4th Disciple, Cilvaringz, Moongod Allah, Barracuda

Cilvaringz chronology
The 3rd Chamber (2003)	I (2007)

Professional ratings
Review scores
Source	Rating
Allmusic	4/5 stars
RapReviews.com	(8.0/10)

I is the debut album from Wu-Tang Clan-affiliated producer Cilvaringz. Cilvaringz limited all production to in-house Wu-Tang producers only, a formula applied to Wu-Tang albums recorded between 1993 and 1997. Allmusic.com gave the album 4 out of 5 stars and an Album of the Month notation. I sold 62,800 copies worldwide with the majority of sales in the United States.

== Track listing ==
No.	Title	Producer(s)	Length
1.	"Poison Ring Chamber (Intro)"	Cilvaringz	0:39
2.	"Wu-Tang Martial Expert" (feat. RZA)	Moongod Allah	2:51
3.	"The Weeping Tiger" (feat. Raekwon, RZA & Ghostface Killah)	RZA	3:31
4.	"Sheherezad, My Beloved (The Greatest Story Ever Told – Chapter I)"	Cilvaringz	4:37
5.	"Death to America"	Cilvaringz & RZA	3:38
6.	"In The Name of Allah" (feat. Masta Killa, Killah Priest, Method Man, RZA, & Shabazz the Disciple)	RZA & Cilvaringz	7:29
7.	"Jewels" (feat. GZA)	RZA	3:32
8.	"Christ & Judas (Skit)" / "Brothers Ain't Brothers"	Bronze Nazareth	4:00
9.	"Blazing Saddles" (feat. Killarmy)	Cilvaringz	2:41
10.	"Caravanserai – Chapter I" (feat. Raekwon)	RZA	0:44
11.	"Damascus"	True Master	2:56
12.	"Caravanserai – Chapter II" (feat. Salah Edin & Raekwon)	Cilvaringz & RZA	1:07
13.	"Two Missed Calls... (Skit)"	Allah Mathematics	1:21
14.	"Dart Tournament" (feat. Killa Sin & Blue Raspberry)	Cilvaringz	2:49
15.	"The Saga..."	Cilvaringz	4:39
16.	"Forever Michael (Wacko Tablo)"	RZA	3:13
17.	"Elephant Juice" (feat. Featherz)	4th Disciple	5:02
18.	"Deaf, Dumb & Blind" (feat. Roger Peterson)	4th Disciple	4:40
19.	"Warriors & Poets (Skit)"	Cilvaringz	1:26
20.	"Valentine Day Massacre" (feat. 9th Prince, 60 Second Assassin, Shabazz the Disciple & Blue Raspberry)	Moongod Allah	4:59
21.	"Poison Ring Chamber (Outro)" (feat. Method Man)	Cilvaringz & Barracuda	0:38
