= Birth of a Prince =

Studio album by RZA
- Released: October 7, 2003
- Recorded: June–September 2003
- Studio: 36 Chambers Studio (New York, NY)
- Genre: Hip Hop
- Length: 58:19
- Label: Sanctuary
- Producer: Barracuda; Bronze Nazareth; Jose "Choco" Reynoso; Megahertz; RZA; True Master

RZA chronology
Digital Bullet (2001)	Birth of a Prince (2003)	RZA-Instrumental Experience (2007)

Wu-Tang Clan solo chronology
The Movement (2003)	Birth of a Prince (2003)	The Struggle (2003)

Singles from Birth of a Prince
- 1. "We Pop" Released: September 23, 2003

Birth of a Prince is the third solo studio album by American rapper and record producer RZA. It was released on October 7, 2003, through Sanctuary Records. Recording sessions took place on June–September 2003 at 36 Chambers Studio in New York. Production was handled by Bronze Nazareth, Barracuda, Jose "Choco" Reynoso, Megahertz, True Master, and the RZA himself, who produced the majority of the tracks. It features contributions from fellow Wu-Tang Clan members Masta Killa, Ghostface Killah and Ol' Dirty Bastard, as well as Wu-Tang affiliates Allah Real, Free Murder, ShaCronz, Cilvaringz, Beretta 9, Prodigal Sunn and Tash Mahogany, and German singer Xavier Naidoo.

The album peaked at number 49 on the Billboard 200 and number 20 on the Top R&B/Hip-Hop Albums in the United States, number 123 on the French SNEP Top 200 Albums, number 26 on the Official Hip Hop and R&B Albums Chart and number 20 on the Official Independent Albums Chart in the United Kingdom. Its lead single, O.D.B.-assisted "We Pop", found mild success in the UK, reaching number 28 on the Official Hip Hop and R&B Singles Chart and number 29 on the Official Independent Singles Chart.

Unlike RZA's other solo albums, Birth of a Prince was not released under the 'Bobby Digital' alias, though RZA refers to himself as Bobby repeatedly and his rhymes are mostly in the Bobby Digital style rather than the pre-1998 style.

== Critical reception ==
Professional ratings
Aggregate scores
Source	Rating
Metacritic	62/100
Review scores
Source	Rating
AllHipHop	2/5 stars
AllMusic	3/5 stars
Blender	3/5 stars
laut.de	4/5 stars
Pitchfork	3.1/10
Playlouder	5/5
RapReviews	7/10
Stylus	3.1/10
The Village Voice	(3-star Honorable Mention)
Tiny Mix Tapes	1/5 marks

Birth of a Prince was met with generally favourable reviews from music critics. At Metacritic, which assigns a normalized rating out of 100 to reviews from mainstream publications, the album received an average score of 62, based on eleven reviews.

Adam Alphabet of Playlouder praised the album, calling it "the piece of the RZA puzzle we've been waiting a decade for. It's that important". Serena Kim of The Village Voice found the album "as esoteric as you'd expect RZA to be. But it's also more Wu". James Poletti of Dotmusic labeled it as "the latest in a long line of frustratingly hit and miss solo efforts". G. Beato of Blender found the album "more proof of RZA's eccentric genius". Robert Gabriel of The Austin Chronicle wrote: "any way you slice it, the Wu is still coming through".

In the mixed reviews, AllMusic's Andy Kellman wrote: "while many will no doubt see this as an unfocused record, those who take it on more of a song-by-song basis will value it as a respectable addition to RZA's body of work". Dave Heaton of PopMatters claimed: "on most of this album he doesn't sound completely off his game, just uninspired, both as an MC and a producer". Owen Strock of Dusted resumed: "RZA still sounds determined, but his rhymes are self-obsessed, repetitive, and dulled by constant calls for drugs and women".

In the negative reviews, John O'Connor of Pitchfork called it "a career low". Scott McKeating of Stylus wrote: "all in all, Birth of a Prince seems more like a stepping stone to better things than a fully fledged work in its own right".

== Track listing ==
No.	Title	Writer(s)	Producer(s)	Length
1.	"Bob n' I"	Robert Diggs	Jose "Choco" Reynoso	2:52
2.	"The Grunge"	Diggs	RZA	1:56
3.	"We Pop" (featuring Dirt McGirt & CCF Division)	Diggs; Russell Jones; S. Cuffie; Frederick Cuffie; Dorsey Wesley	Megahertz	4:53
4.	"Grits" ((featuring Masta Killa & Allah Real))	Diggs; Elgin Turner	RZA	4:17
5.	"Fast Cars" ((featuring Ghostface Killah & Erica Bryant))	Dennis Coles; Derrick Harris	True Master	3:59
6.	"Chi Kung" ((Barretta 9 & Cilvaringz))	Diggs; Samuel Murray; Angelo Desogus	Barracuda	4:20
7.	"You'll Never Know" ((featuring Cilvaringz))	Diggs; Tariq Azzougarh	RZA	3:23
8.	"Drink, Smoke + Fuck"	Diggs	RZA	3:23
9.	"The Whistle" ((featuring Masta Killa & Prodigal Sunn))	Diggs; Vergil Ruff	RZA	3:02
10.	"The Drop Off" ((featuring Daddy-O & Division))	Diggs; S. Cuffie; F. Cuffie	RZA	3:27
11.	"Wherever I Go" ((featuring Allah Real & CCF Division))	Diggs; S. Cuffie; F. Cuffie	RZA	4:49
12.	"Koto Chotan" ((featuring Masta Killa & Tash Mahogany))	Diggs; Turner	RZA	2:50
13.	"A Day to God is 1,000 Years"	Diggs; Justin Cross	Bronze Nazareth	3:57
14.	"Cherry Range" ((featuring Xavier Naidoo))	Diggs; Murray	RZA	3:25
15.	"The Birth"	Diggs; Cross	Bronze Nazareth	4:38
16.	"See the Joy"	Diggs; S. Cuffie; F. Cuffie	RZA	3:10
Total length:				58:19

== Personnel ==
- Robert "RZA" Diggs – vocals, producer & arranger (tracks: 1, 2, 4, 7–12, 14, 16)
- Russell "Ol' Dirty Bastard" Jones – additional vocals (track 3)
- Alfred "Allah Real" Lynn – hook (track 4)
- Dennis "Ghostface Killah" Coles – vocals (track 5)
- Yumika Parjcey – keyboards (track 16)
- Djibril Toure – bass (track 16)
- Ramsey Jones – drums (track 16)
- Khalil Murray – flute (track 16)
- Emi Augustin – trumpet (track 16)
- Jose "Choco" Reynoso – producer (track 1), engineering, mixing
- Dorsey "Megahertz" Wesley – producer (track 3)
- Derek "True Master" Harris – producer (track 5)
- Angelo "Barracuda" Desogus – producer (track 6)
- Justin "Bronze Nazareth" Cross – producer (tracks: 13, 15)
- Emily Lazar – mastering
- Sean Mallinson – package design
- Ivo Kljuce – photography
- Tom Bennett – management

== Charts ==
Chart (2003)	Peak position
French Albums (SNEP)	123
UK R&B Albums (OCC)	26
UK Independent Albums (OCC)	20
US Billboard 200	49
US Top R&B/Hip-Hop Albums (Billboard)	20
