= It All Comes Down to This =

It All Comes Down to This may refer to:

- It All Comes Down to This (album), a 1999 hardcore punk record by Bane
- It All Comes Down to This (mixtape), a 2010 hip hop record by Remedy
