= The Genuine Article =

Studio album by Remedy
- Released: April 17, 2001
- Studio: 36 Chambers Studio (Manhattan, NYC); North Shore Soundworks (Long Island, NY); Ameraycan Studios (North Hollywood, CA); Alien Flyers (New York, NY); Quad Recording Studios (Times Square, NYC)
- Genre: Hip hop
- Length: 53:49
- Label: Fifth Angel Recordings
- Producer: Remedy (also exec.); 4th Disciple

Professional ratings
Review scores
Source	Rating
AllMusic	4/5 stars
Spin	3/10

The Genuine Article is the debut studio album by American rapper and record producer Remedy. It was released on April 17, 2001, via Fifth Angel Recordings. Recording sessions took place at 36 Chambers Studio and Quad Recording Studios in Manhattan, at North Shore Soundworks in Long Island, at Ameraycan Studios in North Hollywood, and at Alien Flyers in New York. Production was handled by Remedy himself, except for "Warning", which was produced by fellow Wu-Tang Clan affiliate 4th Disciple. It features guest appearances from Cappadonna, Children Of The World, Clocka, Solomon Childs, Sweetleaf, RZA and Lounge Lo. The album peaked at number 130 on the US Billboard 200 albums chart.

== Track listing ==
No.	Title	Writer(s)	Length
1.	"Education" (featuring RZA and Children Of The World)	Ross Filler; Robert Diggs; Roger Waters	4:38
2.	"Fallen Angles"	Filler	5:43
3.	"The Ambush" (featuring Cappadonna and Solomon Childs)	Filler; Darryl Hill; R. Lynwood	4:05
4.	"Whiteboy"	Filler	3:02
5.	"Words to Live By"	Filler	3:20
6.	"Calm but Deadly" (featuring Solomon Childs)	Filler; Lynwood	4:00
7.	"Reuven Ben Menachum"	Filler	3:23
8.	"U Don't Care" (featuring Sweetleaf)	Filler	3:24
9.	"Girlfriend" (featuring Cappadonna)	Filler; Hill	4:40
10.	"Hip Hop Music" (featuring Children Of The World)	Filler	3:54
11.	"Can Can" (featuring Lounge Lo and Clocka)	Filler; A. Cornelius; Hassan Johnson	4:36
12.	"Never Again"	Filler	4:10
13.	"Warning" (featuring Clocka and Sweetleaf)	Filler; Johnson; Selwyn Bogard	4:46
Total length:			53:49

== Personnel ==
- Ross "Remedy" Filler – main artist, producer (tracks: 1–12), recording, mixing, engineering, executive producer, sleeve notes
- Robert "RZA" Diggs – featured artist (track 1)
- Children Of The World – featured artist (tracks: 1, 10)
- R. "Solomon Childs" Lynwood – featured artist (tracks: 3, 6)
- Darryl "Cappadonna" Hill – featured artist (tracks: 3, 9)
- Sweetleaf – featured artist (tracks: 8, 13)
- Hassan "Clocka" Johnson – featured artist (tracks: 11, 13)
- A. "Lounge Lo" Cornelius – featured artist (track 11)
- Selwyn "4th Disciple" Bogard – producer (track 13)
- Charlie Marotta – engineering
- Dragen Casanovic – engineering
- Tony Dawsey – mastering
- Brian Frank – art direction, design, photography
- John Pecoraro – management
- Al James – project coordinator

== Charts ==
Chart (2001)	Peak position
US Billboard 200	130
US Top R&B/Hip-Hop Albums (Billboard)	30
US Heatseekers Albums (Billboard)	3
