= Once Upon a Time in Shaolin =

Studio album by Wu-Tang Clan
- Released: October 8, 2015
- Genre: Hip-hop
- Length: 110:12
- Producers: Cilvaringz; RZA

Wu-Tang Clan chronology
A Better Tomorrow (2014)	Once Upon a Time in Shaolin (2015)	The Saga Continues (2017)

Once Upon a Time in Shaolin is the seventh studio album by the American hip-hop group Wu-Tang Clan. It was recorded in secret and features the entire Wu-Tang Clan, plus the rapper Redman, the Wu-Tang Killa Beez, FC Barcelona players, the actress Carice van Houten and the singer Cher.

Feeling the value of music had been cheapened by the internet, the producers Cilvaringz and RZA created only one copy, with no ability to download or stream it. In 2015, Martin Shkreli, the CEO of Turing Pharmaceuticals, bought it at auction for $1.5 million. In 2018, following Shkreli's conviction for securities fraud, a federal court seized assets belonging to him, including Once Upon a Time in Shaolin. In 2021, the US Department of Justice sold it to a corporate entity for more than $2 million, who sold to the non-fungible token collectors PleasrDAO for $4 million.

A legal agreement stipulates that the album cannot be commercially exploited until 2103, although it can be played at listening parties. The first public exhibition began in June 2024 at the Museum of Old and New Art in Hobart, Tasmania. That month, Shkreli livestreamed it on X, triggering a lawsuit from PleasrDAO. PleasrDAO also began selling partial ownership of the album as an NFT, with each purchase accelerating the release by 88 seconds.

Many fans reacted negatively to the news of the single-copy album. Critics who have heard Once Upon a Time in Shaolin in whole or part responded positively. Rolling Stone said it had the potential to become Wu-Tang Clan's most popular album in decades, Complex likened it to early Wu-Tang albums and The Guardian praised the single-copy concept as a "work of art". In 2015, the Guinness Book of Records certified Once Upon a Time in Shaolin as the most valuable album in the world.

== Recording ==
Wu-Tang Clan began working on Once Upon a Time in Shaolin in the late 2000s. It took about six years to complete. It was recorded in secret, mostly in Staten Island, New York, and produced in Marrakesh, Morocco. It features the entire Wu-Tang Clan, plus the rapper Redman, the Wu-Tang Killa Beez, FC Barcelona football players, the actress Carice van Houten and two appearances from the singer and actress Cher. The Wu-Tang rapper Method Man said the members were not told they were working on a Wu-Tang album, and that they were uncomfortable with the single-copy concept after it was announced.

== Release ==
Inspired by musical patronage during the Renaissance, the Wu-Tang producer Cilvaringz decided to create Once Upon a Time in Shaolin as an art object. Feeling the value of music had been cheapened by streaming and online piracy, he and the Wu-Tang producer RZA hoped to return it to the value of fine art. They wrote on their website:

The music industry is in crisis. The intrinsic value of music has been reduced to zero. Contemporary art is worth millions by virtue of its exclusivity ... By adopting a 400 year old Renaissance-style approach to music, offering it as a commissioned commodity and allowing it to take a similar trajectory from creation to exhibition to sale ... we hope to inspire and intensify urgent debates about the future of music.

Wu-Tang deleted the master files. A single copy, on two CDs, is held in a silver jewel-encrusted box with a wax Wu-Tang Clan seal and leather-bound liner notes. On March 3, 2015, the box was detained at JFK Airport for three hours while border control determined its contents. That month, Wu-Tang Clan exhibited the album to a crowd of about 150 art collectors, dealers and critics in Queens, New York. Attendees were searched for recording devices. About 13 minutes of the album were played to the audience.

=== Purchase by Martin Shkreli (2015) ===
Once Upon A Time In Shaolin was auctioned through Paddle8 in 2015, which had previously sold works by artists including Jeff Koons, Julian Schnabel and Damien Hirst. Legal agreements stipulated that it could not be commercially exploited for 88 years, although it could be released free or played at listening parties. According to RZA, the number eight was symbolic as there were eight original members of Wu-Tang Clan, the numbers of the year 2015 add up to eight, Paddle8 has eight in its name, and a rotated eight forms the symbol for infinity, used on their second album, Wu-Tang Forever (1997). The auction gained significant attention. An unfounded rumor spread online that the purchase agreement stipulated that members of Wu-Tang Clan, or the actor Bill Murray, would be allowed one attempt at stealing the record back in a heist.

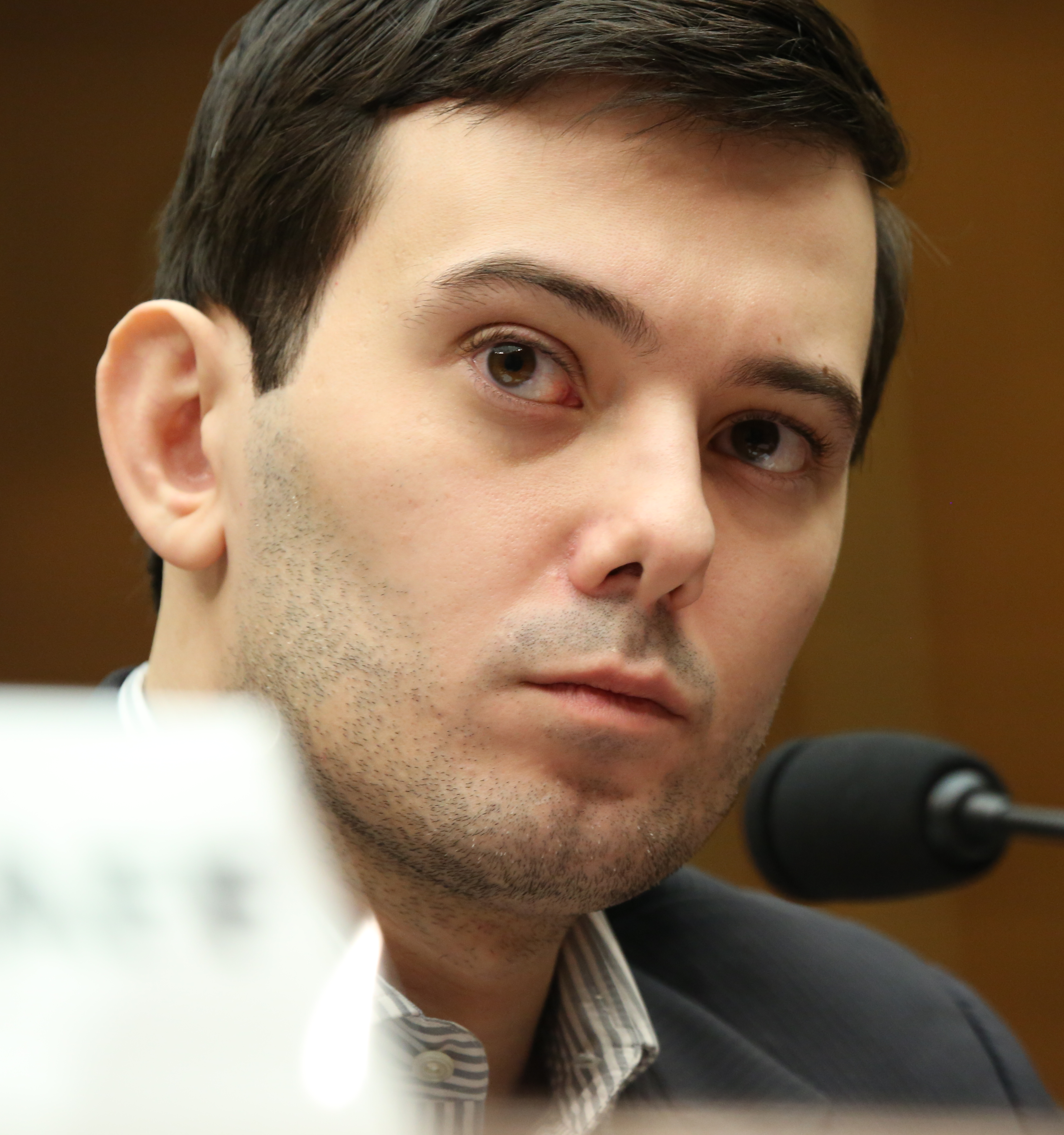
Turing Pharmaceuticals CEO Martin Shkreli, who won the only copy of Once Upon a Time in Shaolin at auction

The winning bid was accepted on May 3, 2015, followed by months of legal diligence. The sale was completed on August 26 to a private individual for an unspecified amount. On December 9, Bloomberg Businessweek identified the buyer as the Turing Pharmaceuticals CEO Martin Shkreli, who had paid $2 million. RZA said the sale was agreed before Shkreli's controversial price hike of the anti-infective agent Daraprim. According to RZA, after learning the buyer's identity, Cilvaringz and Wu-Tang Clan donated a "significant portion" of the proceeds to charity. The Guinness Book of Records certified Once Upon a Time in Shaolin as the most valuable album in the world, surpassing records by Elvis Presley and the Beatles.

In January 2016, Shkreli told Vice that he had considered destroying the album or "installing it in some remote place so that people have to make a spiritual quest to listen". He promised to release it free if Donald Trump won the 2016 US presidential election. In November, after Trump was elected, Shkreli streamed excerpts online. In February 2016, the artist Jason Koza sued RZA, Cilvaringz, Paddle8 and Shkreli in the U.S. District Court for the Southern District of New York, alleging they used his artwork on the album without permission. Koza withdrew the case that May.

In September 2017, Shkreli attempted to sell Once Upon a Time in Shaolin on the online auction site eBay, with the winning bid passing $1m. He was incarcerated on unrelated fraud counts before the sale could be completed. RZA disapproved of the sale, saying: "I think he could have got more than what he paid. I was actually impressed that within eight days he got up to $1m in bidding ... If it had been left a bit longer, no telling how far it would have gone." RZA hoped to buy it himself, but was contractually unable.

=== Purchase by PleasrDAO (2018–2021) ===
In March 2018, following Shkreli's conviction for securities fraud, a federal court seized assets belonging to him worth $7.36m, including Once Upon a Time in Shaolin. On July 27, 2021, Jacquelyn M. Kasulis, acting United States Attorney for the Eastern District of New York, announced that the US Department of Justice had sold the album in connection with the approximately $7.4 million forfeiture judgment entered against Shkreli at his March 2018 sentencing. It was purchased for $2,238,482.30 by WTC Endeavours Limited, a corporate entity created in Hong Kong for the purchase.

In September 2021, the album was sold for $4 million to PleasrDAO, a group that purchases non-fungible tokens (NFTs) that honor "anti-establishment rebels". PleasrDAO had previously purchased NFTs related to the American whistleblower Edward Snowden and the Russian punk band Pussy Riot. PleasrDAO described the purchase as the "ultimate protest against middlemen and rent seekers of musicians and artists" and described Shkreli as "the ultimate internet villain". It hoped to make the album more widely available, but is bound by the restrictions forbidding its release to the public, and suggested it could be played at listening parties or exhibitions.

=== Public exhibition and NFTs (2024) ===
On June 9, 2024, Shkreli livestreamed Once Upon a Time in Shaolin to an audience of approximately 5,000 via the social network X. It was the first time it had been made available for public listening. PleasrDAO sued Shkreli for playing it without permission, arguing that he had diminished its value. Judge Pamela K. Chen issued a temporary restraining order blocking Shkreli from disseminating the album. On 27 August, a New York federal judge ordered Shkreli to surrender his copies.

The first official exhibition of Once Upon a Time in Shaolin began on June 15, 2024, at the Museum of Old and New Art in Hobart, Tasmania. Attendees signed a waiver promising not to record it, binding until 2103, and were played a 30-minute mix created by Cilvaringz for the exhibition. That month, PleasrDAO began selling partial ownership of the album as an NFT for one dollar. Each purchase accelerates the release date by 88 seconds and gives the purchaser a five-minute sampler.

In September 2025, Chen refused to dismiss PleasrDAO's lawsuit against Shkreli, ruling that he had potentially violated federal protections for trade secrets by retaining copies of the album. Chen wrote that "the secret and exclusive nature of the album is a large part of its intrinsic value". In January 2026, Shkreli counter-sued RZA and Cilvaringz, saying they had improperly sold the album copyrights to PleasrDAO. Chen rejected the move, saying counterclaims can only be asserted against an opposing party (PleasrDAO).

== Music ==
Reporting from the exhibition in Queens, Complex described Once Upon a Time in Shaolin as "rich, layered, and sonically bombastic", with a "rugged, hard-hitting sound" reminiscent of early Wu-Tang Clan albums. It begins with "ominous, foreboding" sounds of rain and thunder, before the rapper Raekwon begins the first verse. Other sounds include fire sirens, crowd applause, and a marching drum beat. Cher appears twice, as singer and actress, and closes the record with the "belted" words "Wu-Tang baby, they rock the world".

== Response ==
The Rolling Stone critic Christopher Weingarten wrote that, based on the 13 minutes played in Queens, Once Upon a Time in Shaolin had the potential to become Wu-Tang Clan's most popular album since 1997. He likened it to the U2 album All That You Can't Leave Behind (2000) and the Metallica album Death Magnetic (2008), and said it "hearkened back to the RZA's glory days" of the mid-1990s.

Shkreli played the album during his interview with the Vice writer Allie Conti, who said: "From what I heard, it was definitely better than their last album, although I wouldn't say it's worth $2 million necessarily." After attending the Tasmania exhibition, the Guardian writer Sian Cain wrote that the album was "not as thrillingly in your face" as the 1993 debut Enter the Wu-Tang, but was "easily as good" as Wu-Tang Forever (1997), with a more polished sound than both. She concluded: "So as Wu-Tang Clan music goes, it's good. But as a work of art, Once Upon a Time in Shaolin is truly great."

Many fans reacted negatively to the news of the single-copy album. Method Man supported the concept, but spoke out against the 88-year commercial ban, blaming RZA and Cilvaringz. He said: "Fuck that album ... When music can't be music and y'all turning it into something else, fuck that. Give it to the people, if they want to hear the shit, let them have it. Give it away free." RZA replied that the ban was necessary to maintain the integrity of the album as a work of art and to deflect notions of a publicity stunt. Method Man heard the album for the first time in October 2026 during a listening party for the podcast Pablo Torre Finds Out. He felt Cilvaringz was emulating RZA's sound too closely and some points were overlong, but concluded: "I do not hate this album ... That album ain't as bad as I expected it to be."

In August 2020, it was announced that Paul Downs Colaizzo was set to direct a film for Netflix based on the story of the album, produced by Plan B Entertainment. A documentary, The Disciple, directed by Joanna Natasegera, premiered at the 2026 Sundance Film Festival and is scheduled for release on Netflix in October 2026.

== Personnel ==
Wu-Tang Clan

- Cappadonna
- Ghostface Killah
- GZA
- Inspectah Deck
- Masta Killa
- Method Man
- RZA, also co-production
- Raekwon
- U-God

Additional personnel

- Cilvaringz – production
- Carice van Houten
- Cher – vocals
- Killah Priest
- Killa Sin
- Streetlife
- Tekitha
- La the Darkman
- Redman
- Shyheim
- Brooklyn Zu
- Shabazz the Disciple
- Killarmy
- Sunz Of Man
- Blue Raspberry
- Popa Wu
- Gravediggaz
- Vanessa Liftig
- Ken Lewis – mixing engineer
- Eslam Jawaad – co-executive producer

== See also ==
- Musique pour Supermarché, another single-copy album
- List of most valuable records
