= The Great Migration (album) =

Studio album by Bronze Nazareth
- Released: May 23, 2006
- Genre: Hip hop
- Length: 49:01
- Label: Think Differently Music; Babygrande
- Producer: Bronze Nazareth; Dreddy Kruger

Bronze Nazareth chronology
The Great Migration (2006)	Wisemen Approaching (2007)

Singles from The Great Migration
- 1. "The Pain / More Than Gold" Released: 2006

Professional ratings
Review scores
Source	Rating
AllHipHop	3.5/5 stars
AllMusic	3/5 stars
PopMatters	6/10
RapReviews	8.5/10

The Great Migration is the debut album by American rapper and record producer Bronze Nazareth. It was released on May 23, 2006, through Think Differently Music/Babygrande Records. Production was handled by Nazareth with Dreddy Kruger serving as co-producer. It features guest appearances from Wisemen, 2 on da Road, Byata, Killa Sin, Sean Price and Timbo King.

== Track listing ==
No.	Title	Writer(s)	Producer(s)	Length
1.	"In The Beginning (Intro)"		Bronze Nazareth	0:14
2.	"The Pain"	Justin Cross	Bronze Nazareth	3:40
3.	"More Than Gold" (featuring Timbo King)		Bronze Nazareth; Dreddy Kruger (co.)	4:10
4.	"Killa Beez Attack (Skit)"		Bronze Nazareth	0:23
5.	"The Bronzeman" (featuring Killa Sin)	J. Cross; Jeryl Grant	Bronze Nazareth; Dreddy Kruger (co.)	3:56
6.	"One Plan" (featuring Byata)	J. Cross; Beatrice Dikker; R. Wilson	Bronze Nazareth	3:27
7.	"Instrumental (Interlude)"	J. Cross	Bronze Nazareth	0:40
8.	"Stolen Van Gogh"	J. Cross	Bronze Nazareth	1:34
9.	"5th Chamber" (featuring 12 O'Clock, Sean Price and Prodigal Sunn)	J. Cross; Odion Turner; Sean Price; Lamar Ruff	Bronze Nazareth; Dreddy Kruger (co.)	3:56
10.	"Stupid Fucking White Man (Skit)"		Bronze Nazareth	0:19
11.	"Good Morning (A Nice Hell)"	J. Cross	Bronze Nazareth	4:00
12.	"Rare Breed" (featuring Phillie)	J. Cross; J. Wilson	Bronze Nazareth	3:39
13.	"Hear What I Say!"	J. Cross	Bronze Nazareth	3:23
14.	"Black Royalty"	J. Cross	Bronze Nazareth	2:45
15.	"Detroit" (featuring Kevlaar 7 and Phillie)	J. Cross; Kevin Cross; J. Wilson	Bronze Nazareth	3:30
16.	"$ (Aka Cash Rule)"	J. Cross	Bronze Nazareth	3:10
17.	"Poem Burial Ground"	J. Cross; J. Williams	Bronze Nazareth	3:39
18.	"The Great Migration"	J. Cross	Bronze Nazareth	3:18
19.	"Bronze Halls (Outro)"		Bronze Nazareth	0:45
Total length:				49:01

== Personnel ==
- Justin "Bronze Nazareth" Cross – vocals, producer, co-executive producer, arranger
- Timothy "Timbo King" Drayton – vocals (track 3)
- Jeryl "Killa Sin" Grant – vocals (track 5)
- Beatrice "Byata" Dikker – vocals (track 6)
- Odion "12 O'Clock" Turner – vocals (track 9)
- Sean Price – vocals (track 9)
- Lamar "Prodigal Sunn" Ruff – vocals (track 9)
- J. "Phillie" Wilson – vocals (tracks: 12, 15)
- Kevin "Kevlaar 7" Cross – vocals (track 15)
- James "Dreddy Kruger" Dockery – arranger, co-producer (tracks: 3, 5, 9), executive producer, A&R
- Chris Conway – mixing
- Emily Lazar – mastering
- Matthew Markoff – A&R
- Jill Shehebar – management
- Jesse Stone – management
