= The Struggle (Cappadonna album) =

Studio album by Cappadonna
- Released: October 7, 2003
- Genre: Hip hop
- Length: 1:06:23
- Label: Code:Red Entertainment
- Producer: 4th Disciple; Calogero; Charlie Marotta; D.A.; Mizza; Quasi; Remedy; Soulfingaz

Cappadonna chronology
The Yin and the Yang (2001)	The Struggle (2003)	The Cappatilize Project (2008)

Wu-Tang Clan solo chronology
Birth of a Prince (2003)	The Struggle (2003)	The Lex Diamond Story (2003)

Professional ratings
Review scores
Source	Rating
AllHipHop	3.5/5 stars
AllMusic	2/5 stars
Laut.de	3/5 stars

The Struggle is the third solo studio album by American rapper Cappadonna. It was released on October 7, 2003 via Code:Red Entertainment. Production was handled by Calogero, Mizza, Quasi, Remedy, Soulfingaz, 4th Disciple, Charlie Marotta and D.A. It features guest appearances from Lounge Lo, Solomon Childs, Remedy, Crunch Lo, Inspectah Deck, King Just, Pike, Raekwon and Wiggs.

The album was dropped on the same day as fellow Wu-Tang Clan mamber RZA's Birth of a Prince.

== Track listing ==
No.	Title	Producer(s)	Length
1.	"Intro"		0:16
2.	"Cap Is Back"	Calogero	3:29
3.	"Role of a Lifetime" (featuring Solomon Childs)	Calogero	3:14
4.	"Blood Brothers" (featuring Lounge Mode)	4th Disciple	3:14
5.	"Mamma" (Skit)		0:18
6.	"Mamma"	Calogero	2:53
7.	"Do It - Push"	Soulfingaz	3:08
8.	"Get Away from the Door" (featuring Inspectah Deck)	Remedy	2:58
9.	"Money, Cash, Flows" (featuring Remedy, Lounge Mode and Crunch Lo)	Soulfingaz	3:20
10.	"I Don't Even Know You"	Calogero	2:25
11.	"Make Money Money" (Skit)		0:11
12.	"Season of da' Vick" (featuring Lounge Mode)		3:12
13.	"Killa Killa Hill" (featuring Raekwon)	Remedy	3:37
14.	"Broken Glass"	Quasi	2:44
15.	"Power to the Peso" (featuring Lounge Mode, Wiggs and Solomon Childs)	Mizza	3:14
16.	"Life of a Lesbo"	Mizza	3:44
17.	"Pain Is Love" (featuring Lounge Mode and Solomon Childs)	Quasi	3:19
18.	"Show" (Skit)		1:00
19.	"My Kinda Bitch"	D.A.	2:30
20.	"We Got This" (featuring Pike, Lounge Mode and Remedy)	Calogero	4:08
21.	"Struggle With This" (featuring King Just)	Charlie Marotta	13:29
Total length:			1:06:23
