= Mathematics Presents Wu-Tang Clan & Friends Unreleased =

Mathematics Presents... Wu-Tang Clan & Friends Unreleased

Compilation album by Mathematics & Wu-Tang Clan
- Released: February 6, 2007
- Genre: Hip hop
- Length: 68:24
- Label: Nature Sounds
- Producer: Mathematics

Mathematics & Wu-Tang Clan chronology
Wu-Tang Meets the Indie Culture (2005)	Mathematics Presents... Wu-Tang Clan & Friends Unreleased (2007)	Return of the Swarm, Vol. 5 (2008)

Mathematics Presents - Wu-Tang Clan & Friends Unreleased (Note: Also formatted as Wu-Tang Clan & Friends: Unreleased or Wu-Tang Clan & Friends, Unreleased.) is a compilation produced by rap music producer Mathematics. It was released on February 6, 2007 under label Nature Sounds. It contains unreleased songs by Wu-Tang Clan and their affiliates.

Later, in 2010, Mathematics produced Return of the Wu and Friends.

== Track listing ==
#	Title	Performers	Time
1	"Intro"	Buddha Bless	01:43
2	"Maxine (Remix)"	Ghostface Killah & Raekwon	03:43
3	"King Toast Queen"	U-God, Buddha Bless, Masta Killa & Solomon Childs	04:09
4	"Where's Brooklyn @?"	Bad Luck, All Day & Allah Real	07:27
5	"Treez"	Raekwon	03:48
6	"Eggs, Hash & Grits"	M-Speed, Streetlife & Drama	03:02
7	"Pop Shit (Skit)"	Wu-Tang Clan	01:27
8	"Queens Day '88 (Remix)"	Eyeslow	04:43
9	"U Don't Care"	Killah Priest, Hot Flames & Buddha Bless	04:12
10	"Masked Avengers"	Shyheim, Superb & Hell Razah	03:26
11	"Luv (Skit)"	Wu-Tang Clan	00:47
12	"Wanna Believe"	Allah Real & Bad Luck	04:47
13	"Wu Banga (Remix)"	GZA, Ghostface Killah, Raekwon, Cappadonna & Masta Killa	05:03
14	"Da 'N' (Remix)"	GZA, Method Man, U-God, Raekwon & RZA	03:51
15	"Violent (Skit)"	Wu-Tang Clan	00:43
16	"Street Kronicles"	M-Speed	05:02
17	"Non-Equivalent"	Shyheim	03:22
18	"Outro"	Wu-Tang Clan	01:18
19	"Wise (Remix)"	Ghostface Killah	04:31
20	"Rap Burglars"	Raekwon & Inspectah Deck	03:37

== Reception ==
Impose described the collection as "a 20-tuned compilation of remixes, B-sides and obscure Wu material", with a "continuous swinging baseline", a "soulful musical setting which provide a fine contrast to the rappers lyrical grit", and "sounds that stem from the comforting to the intimidating". Nevertheless, the magazine also described the collection as "appeal[ing] more to the Wu-head than the casual Wu-Tang fan".

Complex called one song from the collection, Maxine (Remix), "told over a heavy-duty 1970s experience" but "smooth[ed ]out considerably with an easy-like-Sunday-morning groove".

HipHopDX praised the compilation as a "testament to the knob twisting skills of Mathematics", but also stated that "the Clan's core members don’t make enough unheard appearances on the disc".
