= Nightmares That Surface from Shallow Sleep =

Studio album by Warcloud
- Released: 2002
- Genre: Hip hop
- Label: Skarekrow Music; ChamberMusik SP (reissue)

Warcloud chronology
Nightmares That Surface from Shallow Sleep (2002)	Smuggling Booze in the Graveyard (2002)

Nightmares That Surface from Shallow Sleep is the first album by American rapper and Wu-Tang Clan affiliate Warcloud, originally released in 2002 as a CD-R by the Skarekrow Music label. It was remastered and reissued in 2006.

Production was mostly handled by The Skarekrow, who produced seven tracks, and Item #, who produced five; producers 6 Mil, Halo, Tariq and Uno each produced one. Guest vocal appearances were made by Wu-Tang affiliates Black Knights, Northstar and singer Suga Bang Bang, as well as by Kurupt, Leviathan, Mantra, Onslaut, Sandman and The Skarekrow.

== Track listing ==
1. "America"
  - Produced by The Skarekrow
2. "Island of Dr. Warcloud"
  - Produced by Uno
3. "Ghost Pirates: Old Los Angeles"
  - Produced by The Scarekrow
  - Featuring The Skarekrow
4. "Strawberry Cream Champaign: The Club Joint"
  - Produced by The Skarekrow
  - Featuring Crisis & Monk of the Black Knights
5. "Something Is Going to Make Me Smack This Bitch"
  - Produced by 6 Mil
  - Featuring Kurupt, Black Knights & Sandman
6. "The Beer Song"
  - Produced by The Skarekrow
7. "Old Toy Room/A Pie In The Sky (Food For Thought) "
  - Produced by Item #
8. "Vicious Killer Beez"
  - Produced by Item #
  - Featuring Suga Bang Bang & Northstar
9. "The Renaissance"
  - Produced by Item #
  - Featuring Leviathan & Mantra
10. "In the Hall of the Warrior King"
  - Produced by Item #
11. "Channel "
  - Produced by Tariq
12. "Mad Axes"
  - Produced by Item #
13. "Mics, Turntables, Spray Cans & Records"
  - Produced The Skarekrow
  - Featuring Leviathan & Skarekrow
14. "Falling Hammer"
  - Produced by Halo
15. "Fever Dream"
  - Produced by The Skarekrow
16. "Stay With It"
  - Produced by The Skarekrow
  - Featuring Leviathan & Onslaut
