= The Disciple (2026 film) =

2026 documentary film

- Release poster
- Directed by: Joanna Natasegara
- Produced by: Lauren Dark; Vanessa Kirby; Abigail Anketell-Jones; Joanna Natasegara
- Cinematography: Franklin Dow; Pierre Aïm
- Edited by: Chloë Lambourne; Chris Dickens
- Music by: MJ Cole
- Production companies: Unified Productions; Bird Street Productions; Studio Gebbia; Film4; Sony Music Vision; 36 Cinema; Aluna Entertainment; Violet Films
- Distributed by: Netflix
- Release dates: January 22, 2026 (Sundance); October 16, 2026 (Netflix)
- Running time: 106 minutes
- Countries: United States; United Kingdom
- Language: English

The Disciple (also known as The Disciple: A Wu-Tang Fable) is a 2026 documentary film directed and co-produced by Joanna Natasegara. A co-production of the United States and the United Kingdom, it chronicles the journey of Dutch-Moroccan rapper and producer Cilvaringz and his role in the creation of Once Upon a Time in Shaolin, the Wu-Tang Clan's one-of-a-kind album.

The film had its world premiere at the 2026 Sundance Film Festival on January 22. It was released globally by Netflix on October 16.

== Premise ==
The film follows Cilvaringz, a Dutch Moroccan rapper and producer whose journey evolved from devoted Wu-Tang Clan fan to trusted collaborator within the group's inner circle.

The film is structured in two halves: the first focuses on Cilvaringz's path from a teenager in Tilburg, Netherlands, who discovered Wu-Tang Clan while playing basketball with friends, to becoming part of RZA's inner circle through persistence and repeated trips to New York. The second half chronicles the creation of Once Upon a Time in Shaolin, a 31-track double album housed in a handcrafted silver box, of which only one legal copy exists. The album was conceived as a statement against the devaluation of music in the streaming era, positioning the work as fine art rather than mass-distributed content.

The documentary also covers the album's controversial sale in 2015 to Martin Shkreli for $2 million, subsequent seizure by the U.S. government following Shkreli's securities fraud conviction, and eventual acquisition by NFT collective PleasrDAO for $4 million in 2021. The nine core Wu-Tang Clan members appear only in archival footage, while interviews feature Cilvaringz, members of the Wu-Tang Killa Bees, and Cyrus Bozorgmehr, who helped usher the Shaolin project into existence.

== Production ==
Director Joanna Natasegara met Cilvaringz through a friend while on holiday in Morocco. Natasegara, a Wu-Tang Clan fan since her teenage years in Manchester, said she wanted to avoid making a "beef movie" and instead sought to highlight the spirituality and ethics underlying the Clan's art. The film employs a visual style inspired by Wu-Tang and RZA's creative references, particularly Hong Kong martial arts cinema.

== Release ==
The Disciple had its world premiere in the Premieres section at the 2026 Sundance Film Festival on January 22. It was also selected for the 53rd Telluride Film Festival.

It was released globally by Netflix on October 16.

== Reception ==
Chris Willman of Variety called the film "an amusing yarn, well told" and praised Cilvaringz as "a charismatic and compelling narrator of his own story," while noting that the absence of fresh interviews with the nine core Wu-Tang members was "a pretty big hole to fill in." David Fear of Rolling Stone described the documentary as "a testament to both the lingua franca power of hip-hop and the ability of obsession to fuel four-alarm conflagrations of creative ambition," calling it "required viewing for anyone interested in hip-hop legacies and fanboy fantasies made manifest." Daniel Fienberg of The Hollywood Reporter noted that the film gives Cilvaringz and the Once Upon a Time in Shaolin saga a "whimsical underdog documentary treatment."
