= DJ Static (Danish DJ) =

Danish DJ, producer, and event organizer

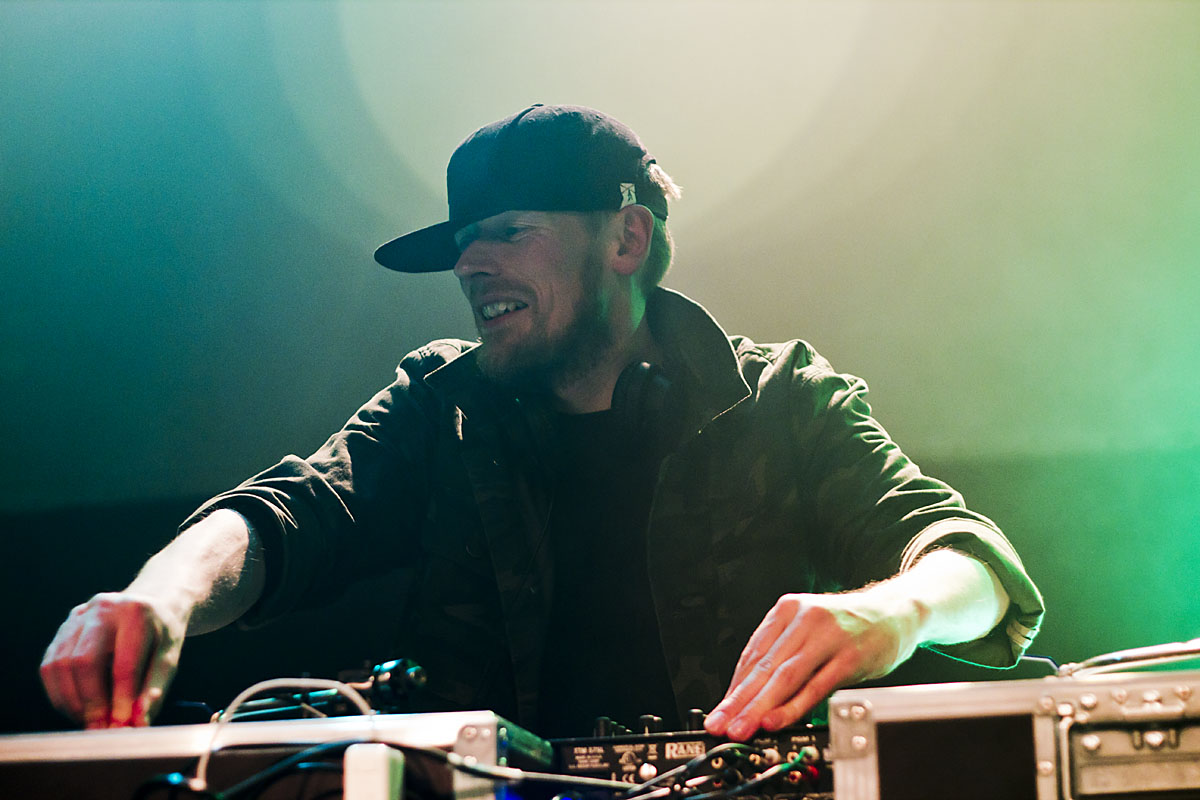
DJ Static

Thorbjørn Schwarz, better known by his stage name DJ Static or just Static is a Danish DJ, producer, and event organizer. He is co-founder, in partnership with Rasmus Lauridsen, of City Hall Music, a Danish record label. In 2012, he released his debut album Rolig under pres that reached the top of the Danish Albums Chart in its initial week of release.

== Career ==
A prolific producer of records and mixtapes for many artists. He was a triple Danish national champion for mixing and has won the pan-European DMC - World DJ Championships. He was also named Best Urban DJ for 5 consecutive years from 2004 to 2008 during the Danish DeeJay Awards.

He was the host for 10 years of the popular MC's Fight Night before ceding the responsibility to DJ Noize. Other events that he plays active role in Hele Vejen (in cooperation with Bang Bang Club and Christian Dyhr), organizing events in many locations including "Blauw Blauw" on Vestergade 58, Aarhus.

DJ Static often performs with Negash Ali, Per Vers, Jøden, Majors and has formed duos most notably as "Static and Nat III" and "Static & Temu".

== Mix competitions and awards ==
- 1997: Europe ITF champion
- 1998: Danish ITF champion / Danish DMC Champion / DMC world finalist
- 1999: Danish DMC champion / DMC world finalist
- 2004-2008: Denmark's best HipHop DJ (5 times)
- 2009: Schumacher lifetime achievement award

== Discography ==
=== Albums ===
Static & Nat ill - Teamwork - 2005

Year	Album	Peak position	Certifications	Notes
Year	Album	DEN	Certifications	Notes
2012	Rolig under pres	1		

From The Beginning 2017

Mixtapes and other releases

- Blauw Blauw Megamix
- The Nightshift Mixtape Pts 1 and 2
- Fordi jeg kan (Static) (mixtape)
- Rhymes 2 Riddims
- One
- Doin' Damage (with Dj Hype)

Music video

- "Get Up Get Out" (Static & Nat Ill)
- "Chefpikken" (Static feat. Jokeren) (2012)
- "Do it" (Static feat. Black El) (2012)
- "Fucker Rundt Alene" (feat. Peter Sommer, Shaka Loveless, Tue Track) (2012)
- "Som En Vinder" (feat. Raske Penge, Danni Toma) (2012)
