= The Price of Kings =

- Directed by: Joanna Natasegara; Richard Symons
- Written by: Joanna Natasegara; Richard Symons
- Produced by: Joanna Natasegara; Richard Symons
- Narrated by: Helena Bonham Carter
- Cinematography: Jake Corbett
- Music by: Tom McFarland; Stuart Briner
- Distributed by: Spirit Level Film
- Language: English

The Price of Kings is a projected twelve-part feature-length documentary film series directed by Joanna Natasegara and Richard Symons. Each film focuses on the life and leadership of a specific world leader. The first film in the series, Yasser Arafat, was released in 2011.

== The films ==
=== The Price of Kings: Yasser Arafat ===
The first film in the series focuses on the legacy of the late President of Palestine, Yasser Arafat. Featuring extensive and personal interviews with the people who knew the leader best, most notably with his wife Suha Arafat, the film chronicles Arafat's life from his birth to his mysterious death in a Paris hospital in 2004.

The Price of Kings: Yasser Arafat was released in January 2012.

=== The Price of Kings: Shimon Peres ===
The second film in the series focuses on the life of the ex-President of Israel, Shimon Peres. Based on interviews with President Peres, his family, friends, colleagues and opponents, the film reveals some of the major events which occurred during Shimon Peres' six decades as an Israeli politician.

The Price of Kings: Shimon Peres was released in March 2012.

=== The Price of Kings: Oscar Arias ===
The third film in the series focuses on the story of the little-known ex-President of Costa Rica, Oscar Arias Sanchez. Centering on frank and illuminating conversations with Arias himself, his daughter, brother, former colleagues and critics, the film reveals how Arias gained immense popularity in his home country after bringing peace to Central America through the Esquipulas Peace Agreement and then squandered his success by running as President for a second term from 2006 to 2010.

The Price of Kings: Oscar Arias was released in November 2012.

== Film festivals ==
=== Yasser Arafat ===
- Copenhagen International Documentary Festival (November 2011)
- Dubai International Film Festival (December 2011)
- New Horizon Film Festival (September 2012)
- Biografilm International Festival of Lives
- Jerusalem International Film Festival

=== Shimon Peres ===
- Los Angeles Jewish Film Festival
- Biografilm International Festival of Lives
- Jerusalem International Film Festival

== Reception ==
Critical reception for the first film was mostly positive. The Hollywood Reporter praised Yasser Arafat as being "[an] engrossingly edited, celebratory view of PLO leader Yasser Arafat’s personal sacrifices during his political career".
