= Visions of the 10th Chamber =

Compilation album by Popa Wu
- Released: October 31, 2000
- Genre: Hip-Hop
- Length: 1:08:07
- Label: Stargate Worldwide Entertainment
- Producer: RZA

Popa Wu chronology
Visions of the 10th Chamber	-

Visions of the 10th Chamber is a compilation of songs by various Wu-affiliates compiled by Popa Wu.

== Track listing ==
1. New Improved - (4:25) Manchuz ft. Kendra
2. I Ain't Playin' No More - (4:23) Lady Raw
3. Life of a Gangster - (4:08) Cuffie Crime Family
4. Who's Got Game - (3:55) Don Chulo
5. Three Amigo's (If It's On) - (3:43) King Just, Sic, & Method Man
6. Red Rum - (3:41) Da Manchuz
7. Simply Ludicrous - (2:49) North Star ft. Black Knights
8. Back of the Church - (4:02) Zu Ninjaz
9. Sundown - (4:06) United Kingdom & Cuffie Crime Family
10. You're My Everything - (4:26) King Just
11. I Like to Ride It - (3:44) Lady Raw
12. Never Shit Where You Eat - (5:09) United Kingdom
13. Prepare For The Buddha Monk - (5:01) Brooklyn Zu, Manchuz, & Ol' Dirty Bastard
14. Come One, Come All - (4:39) Cuffie Crime Family
15. How It Goes - (4:35) La the Darkman
16. Gangster Theme - (5:21) Cuffie Crime Family
