= Bronze Nazareth =

- Born: Justin Dante Cross; December 8, 1979 (age 46)
- Origin: Detroit, Michigan, U.S.
- Genres: Hip hop
- Occupations: Rapper; singer; songwriter; record producer
- Years active: 1997-present
- Labels: Black Day In July Productions; Babygrande; iHipHop Distribution; Kings Row Entertainment; Sound Records FKA Criminal Records; Holy Toledo Productions; Man Bites Dog Records; RBC
- Website: bronzenazareth.com

Bronze Nazareth (born Justin Dante Cross; December 8, 1979 in Grand Rapids, Michigan) is an American rapper and record producer associated with the Wu-Tang Clan. He has a solo career as an emcee and is also a part of the hip-hop group Wisemen along with his brother Kevlaar 7.

== Biography ==
He was born and raised in Grand Rapids, Michigan. He received a Bachelor of Science degree in psychology from Michigan State University in 2003. Around 2001, Bronze Nazareth contacted Wu-Tang producer and rapper Cilvaringz who was impressed by his work and added him to his own production team and label Ringz & Partners Inc. Bronze Nazareth, who got his name from Cilvaringz accompanied him during the recording of his debut album and was present for most of the recordings in Steubenville, Ohio and the legendary D&D Studios where Bronze first met with prominent Wu-Tang Clan affiliates 4th Disciple, Killarmy and Sunz Of Man. Eventually Cilvaringz introduced Bronze Nazareth to The RZA who was impressed by his works and added him to the Wu's in-house team. He furthered his technique and sound. Bronze went on to contribute two beats to RZA's solo album Birth of a Prince. He produced most of the 2005 compilation album Wu-Tang Meets The Indie Culture, released on Dreddy Kruger's label Think Differently Music. In 2006 he released his solo debut on this label titled The Great Migration to critical acclaim. It features Wu-Tang Clan affiliates such as Timbo King, Prodigal Sunn and Killa Sin. He produced the majority (11 out of 13 tracks) for Sunz Of Man member 60 Second Assassin's debut solo album Remarkable Timing, along with contributing to affiliated 9th Prince, Timbo King, and Prodigal Sunn. 9 beats were made for his group the Wisemen's second album Children Of A Lesser God released in 2010. He released his 2nd solo album in 2011 called School for the Blindman with features from Canibus, Killah Priest, The Wisemen, RZA, Masta Killa, Raekwon, Inspectah Deck, La The Darkman & Willie the Kid again to critical acclaim. Furthermore, that same year he released Knowing Project Manzu with the Italian duo Project Manzu, providing all production for the album alongside various Wu-affiliates, producing his first non English work.

== Discography ==
=== Albums ===
- The Great Migration (2006)
- Wisemen Approaching (2007) (with Wisemen)
- The Unknown (2007)
- Original S.I.N. (2008) (with Almighty)
- Bronzestrumentals Vol. 1 (2009)
- Children Of A Lesser God (2010) (with Wisemen)
- School for the Blindman (2011)
- Knowing Project Manzu (2011) (with Project Manzu)
- The Migration Sessions (2012)
- The 2nd Coming (2013) (with Almighty)
- Phillie (Bronze Nazareth Produced) (2013)
- Blenders - Bronze Nazareth (2013)
- The Living Daylights - Willie the Kid and Bronze Nazareth (2014)
- Time Flys, Life Dies... Phoenix Rise (2015) (with Canibus)
- Instrumental Mourning (EP, 2016)
- Gravitas (2019) (with KXNG Crooked)
- Coby (2020) (with Illah Dayz)
- Bundle Raps (2021) (with Leaf Dog)
- Season of the Seven (2021) (with Recognize Ali)
- Ekphrasis (2022) (with Roc Marciano)
- Time Waits For No One (2022) (with Lord Jessiah)
- If You're Worried, You Should Be (2022)
- The Process (2023) (with Kurt Solid)
- Ponch'e (2023) (with Illah Dayz)
- Bulletproof Carties (2024) (with Wuzee)
- Things I Seen (2025) (with Termanology)
- Slaveboats with Seatbelts (2025) (with 4ize)
- Funeral For A Dream (2025) (with Apollo Brown)

=== Mixtapes ===
- Thought For Food Vol. 1 (2005)
- Thought For Food Vol. 2 (2008)
- Thought For Food Vol. 3 (2014)

=== Appearances ===
- Various artists - Wu-Tang Meets The Indie Culture (Studio album released October 14, 2005)

12. "Street Corners" (Performed by Bronze Nazareth, and Byata)
19. "Black Dawn" (Performed by Bronze Nazareth)

- Hell Razah - Renaissance Child (Studio album released February 20, 2007)

05. "Los Pepes Pt. 1" (featuring Bronze Nazareth)

- "Gun Barrell Prison" - Shaka Amazulu The 7th featuring Bronze Nazareth (2008)
- "Brain Swell" - Chronicredeye featuring Bronze Nazareth, Franko Fraize & Lyrical T
- "Old Flicks" - Shaka Amazulu The 7th featuring Bronze Nazareth & Cilvaringz Cilvaringz
- "7 Pounds feat. Bronze Nazareth" - Genius/GZA (Unofficial remix released on the internet)
- "Thirsty Vampires - Shaka Amazulu The 7th ft. Jedi Mind Tricks & Bronze Nazareth, Produced by Bronze.
- "Story of Sadness" - Tragic Allies feat. Bronze Nazareth (The Tree of Knowledge of Good & Evil)
- "Ask About Me" - Kevlaar 7 & Woodenchainz ft Styles P & Bronze Nazareth
- "3 Bricks Apollo Figures Remix" ft Ghostface Killah & Raekwon
- "Times Change" - Anthony Vex ft Bronze Nazareth.

== Production discography ==
2003

- The RZA - Birth of a Prince (Studio album released October 7, 2003)

13. "A Day To God Is 1,000 Years"
15. "The Birth"

2005

- Black Market Militia - Black Market Militia (Studio album released March 22, 2005)

01. "Intro: Children of Children"
08. "Righteous Talk"

- Afu-Ra - State of the Arts (Studio album released June 14, 2005)

06. Livin' Like Dat (featuring Masta Killa)

- Various artists - Wu-Tang Meets The Indie Culture (Studio album released October 14, 2005)

01. "Introduction"
02. "Lyrical Swords" (Performed by GZA and Ras Kass)
03. "Slow Blues" (Performed by Timbo King, Prodigal Sunn, Vast Aire and Byata)
06. "Think Differently" (Performed by Casual, Roc Marciano, Vordul Mega and Tragedy Khadafi)
09. "O.D.B. Tribute" (Performed by DJ Noize)
10. "Fragments" (Performed by Del tha Funkee Homosapien)
12. "Street Corners" (Performed by Bronze Nazareth, Solomon Childs and Byata)
13. "Listen" (Performed by Littles, Khalid and Planet Asia)
19. "Black Dawn" (Performed by Bronze Nazareth)

- Blue Raspberry - Out of the Blue (Studio album released 2005)

02. "Growing Up"

2006

- Masta Killa - Made in Brooklyn (Studio album released August 8, 2006)

05. "Nehanda & Cream"
10. "Street Corner" (featuring Inspectah Deck and GZA)
11. "Ringing Bells"

2007

- Hell Razah - Renaissance Child (Studio album released February 20, 2007)

05. "Los Pepes Pt. 1" (featuring Bronze Nazareth)
12. "Millennium Warface"

- Wisemen - Wisemen Approaching (Studio album released February 27, 2007)

01. "Introducing (No Matter How)"
04. "Associated" (featuring GZA)
05. "Mixture Of Muhammad"
06. "Iconoclasts" (featuring Killah Priest and Vast Aire)
07. "Founder Of Pain"
09. "Up There Beyond"
10. "Verbal Joust"
11. "Words From Prodigal Sunn..."
12. "Goblins (Tablets)" (featuring Planet Asia and Prodigal Sunn)
13. "Welcome Home" (featuring Altaire and Gooch)
15. "Wisemen Approaching"

- Cilvaringz - I (Studio album released June 12, 2007)

8. "Christ & Judas (Skit)/Brothers Ain't Brothers"

2008

Immortal Technique - The 3rd World

11. "The Payback" (featuring Ras Kass and Diabolic)

GZA - Pro Tools

4. "Groundbreaking" (featuring Justice Kareem)
10. "Columbian Ties" (featuring True Master)

Vordul Mega - Megagraphitti

6. "Trigganomics"

- "Lady Whirlwind" - Shaka Amazulu The 7th featuring Darkim Be Allah & Allahwise (AIG), [Black Stone of Mecca]
- "Thirsty Vampire" - Shaka Amazulu The 7th ft. Jedi Mind Tricks & Bronze Nazareth [Gods of the Universe]
- "Knights & Armor" - Shaka Amazulu The 7th ft. Black Knights & Wasabifunk [Children of the Heavens]

Almighty - Original S.I.N. (Strength in Numbers) 3. "Handle The Heights" (featuring Canibus & Keith Murray) 7. "Daylight" (featuring Kevlaar 7) 9. "Interlude #1" 10. "Killer Bee Swarm" (featuring Timbo King) 16. "Dead Flowers" (featuring 60 Second Assassin)

2010

- 60 Second Assassin - Remarkable Timing (Studio album released June 22, 2010)

01. "Words From The Assassin (Intro)"
03. "M.O.A.N. (Mind Of An assassiN)" (feat Sunz Of Man)
04. "Clockz N' Kingz" (feat 12 0' Clock, Chi-King & Timbo King)
05. "Remarkable Timing" (feat Masta Killa, M-80 & Poppa Wu)
07. "Cloud 9" (feat T.H.U.G. Angelz, Son One & Kristina Green)
08. "No Face"
09. "Paradise" (feat Timbo King, Killah Priest & Kristina Green)
10. "Love Burns" (feat Prodigal Sunn & Phillie)
11. "The Throne" (feat Planet Asia)
12. "Dead Flowers Part II" (feat C-Rayz Walz & Bronze Nazareth)
13. "Fizza Funky"

- Vinnie Paz - Season of the Assassin (released June 22, 2010)

14. "Role Of Life"

- Hell Razah - Heaven Razah (Studio album released September 28, 2010)

04. "Medical Kush" (co-produced with Kevlaar 7)

- 9th Prince - One Man Army (Studio album released October 11, 2010)

03. "Concrete Jungle"

- Wisemen - Children Of A Lesser God (Studio album released October 26, 2010)

02. "Children Of A Lesser God"
06. "Lucy"
07. "Get U Shot"
08. "Hurt Lockers"
10. "Words From Big Rube (Skit)" (feat Big Rube)
13. "Panic In Vision Park"
15. "Interlude: Toxic"
16. "Makes Me Want A Shot"
18. "Corn Liquor Thoughts"

2011

- Raekwon - Shaolin vs. Wu-Tang (Studio album released March 7, 2011)

01. "Butter Knives"

- Bugsy Da God - The Terrorist Advocate (Studio album released February, 2011)

03. "The Sound Of Gunz" (feat Dom Pachino & Shyheim)

- Timbo King - From Babylon To Timbuk2 (Studio album released September 13, 2011)

01. "The Book Of Timothy (Intro)"
05. "The Two Babylonians [Interlude]"
06. "High Ranking" (feat RA The Rugged Man)
09. "Identity Crisis [Interlude]"
10. "Youth"
13. "Tombstone"
16. "Timbuktu [Interlude]"
17. "Thinking Cap"

- Tragic Allies - Collecting Dust BONUS CD included with The Tree of Knowledge of Good & Evil, debut album of the Tragic Allies released September 27, 2011.)

03. "Undeniable"

- Dom Pachino - The Last Armageddon: Disc 2 (Omega) (Studio album released November 15, 2011)

03. "No Perseverance" feat Chapelz

- Project Manzu - Knowing Project Manzu (Entire album released December 15, 2011)
