= Remedy (rapper) =

American rapper and hip-hop producer (born 1972)

- Also known as: Reuven Ben Menachem
- Born: Ross Filler; November 4, 1972 (age 53); Staten Island, New York City, U.S.
- Genre: Hip hop
- Occupations: Rapper; producer
- Label: Code Red

Remedy (a.k.a. Ross Filler, a.k.a. Reuven Ben Menachem, November 4, 1972, in Staten Island, New York) is an American rapper and hip-hop producer. He was the first Jewish rapper to be affiliated with the Wu-Tang Clan. He owns and runs Code Red Entertainment, his label that released Cappadonna's The Struggle album in 2003. He also served as executive producer on Inspectah Deck's album Manifesto in 2010. Remedy has produced and been featured on various works for ESPN. He released a mixtape, It All Comes Down to This, in 2010. He is the co-executive producer of the Wu-Tang Killa Bees: Return Of The Swarm album.

== Biography ==
He was born and raised in Staten Island in New York City, and is Jewish. His grandfather and grandmother are Holocaust survivors, and his great uncle was shot in the back and his family was killed in the concentration camps by the Nazis. He attended New Dorp High School, where he became friends with the original members of Wu-Tang Clan Method Man, Inspectah Deck and Raekwon the Chef. He took the name Remedy in 1987.

He was the first non-black and the first Jewish rapper to be affiliated with the Wu-Tang Clan.

After emerging with the "Seen it All"/"Everything is Real" 12-inch single, Remedy appeared on the platinum-selling 1998 Wu-Tang Killa Bees: The Swarm compilation with his track "Never Again", a song about the Holocaust. The Tampa Bay Times wrote that the song combined "ancient Jewish prayers, hip-hop rhythms, an ominous melody and quaking lyrics resulted in the most complete and defiant portrait of the Holocaust painted in song."

This track remains his best-known work as well as his most highly regarded, and appeared on his debut album, The Genuine Article (featuring appearances by RZA, Cappadonna, and Inspectah Deck), from 2001. The Genuine Article reached number 130 on the Billboard 200, number 30 on the Billboard Top R&B/Hip-Hop Albums chart, number 5 on the Top Independent Albums chart, and number 4 on Billboard's Top Heatseekers chart.

The song "Never Again" also appeared on his follow-up album, Code Red, from 2003 (Remedy considers the track to be effectively his signature theme song), distributed by Code Red Entertainment. Code Red included a track about the 9/11 attacks, as well as "A Muslim and a Jew", a song about the respective sides in the Palestinian-Israeli conflict (with Wu-Tang leader The RZA acting as mediator).

He owns and runs Code Red Entertainment, his label which released Cappadonna's The Struggle album in 2003. Remedy has also Executive Produced Inspectah Decks "Manifesto" album, as well as Decks latest album, "Chamber No. 9. He has also Executive Produced Ghostface Killah's 2019 album, "Ghostface Killahs". Remedy released his "Remedy Meets WuTang" album on November 26, 2021, which features appearances by the Wu-Tang Clan.

Remedy made a cameo appearance in the 2008 horror/comedy Bad Biology, along with J-Zone, Vinnie Paz (Jedi Mind Tricks) & Reef The Lost Cauze. He has been featured in videos for Cappadonna and Inspectah Deck.

In 2017, Remedy and Talib Kweli feuded on Twitter regarding Remedy's zionism, which conflicts with Kweli's criticism of Israel's control of the West Bank. Remedy is an advocate of Israel and the Jewish people, and of promoting awareness of the Holocaust. RZA said: "I see him as an artist who will educate his people. Just as we have done with ours."

== Discography ==
=== Albums ===
- The Genuine Article (April 2001) - US #130
- Code Red (November 2003)
- It All Comes Down to This (December 2010)
- Remedy Meets Wu-Tang (2021)

=== Appearances ===
- "Transporting" - Remedy and JoJo Pellegrino: "Wu Music Group Presents Pollen - The Swarm Part 3 (2010)"
- "Never Again" - "Wu-Tang Killa Bees - The Swarm Vol.1 (1998)"
- "Testimony" - SHI 360, Remedy, Killah Priest, Harte: Killa Beez in Israel
- "I Like It" - Remedy, Subliminal, Babylon: Killa Beez in Israel
- "Life Neighborhood" - Messika, Elon Babylon, Remedy, Shorti, Dani Deen, Killa Beez in Israel
- "Posse Cut" - R.A. the Rugged Man, Hell Razah, Remedy, Blaq Poet: Legendary Classics Vol. 1.
- "Money, Cash, Flows" - Cappadonna - The Struggle album
- "We Got this" - Cappadonna - The Struggle album
- "The Anthem" - Wu-Tang Collective
- "Rain Outside" - Kinetics, R.A. the Rugged Man: With A Little Help From My Friends
- "City Limits" - Wu-Tang Killa Bees

== See also ==
- List of Wu-Tang Clan affiliates
