= DJ Noize =

Danish DJ

Kim Sæther (born 1975 at Lille Skensved, near Køge), better known as DJ Noize is a Copenhagen-based Danish hip-hop-DJ. His company, Noizeworks places all his activities under one moniker.

== Career ==
DJ Noize started scratching in his local youth club at the age of 13 getting his own pair of Technics 1210 turntables at the age of 15. DJ Noize won Danish master titles in 1993, 1994, 1995, 1996 and 2000 and the New Music Seminar DJ Battle (then called "Clark Kent's Superman Battle for World Supremacy" and MC'd by DJ Clark Kent) in New York City against DJ 8-Ball in the summer of 1994 – the first white non-American to ever win. He won second place at the prestigious DMC World DJ Championships in 1994 and 1995. He became World Champion at the DMC World DJ Championships in 1996. He is famous for his battle performances and wordplay – dicing words from vinyls to produce cheeky disses of his opponents.

He tours the world judging DJ battles and competitions. He has performed with the Freestyle MC Supernatural, and has opened sets for prominent names such as Erykah Badu, Gang Starr and Grandmaster Flash among others.

He hosted his own radio programme showcasing hip-hop on Denmark's Radio for nine years, starting in 1997.

His known personal projects include Nobody Beats The Beats, Skinnyman, the DJ outfit Denmark’s Finest together with DJ Static and DJ Shine, working with the Danish needle company Ortofon and lately he has become one-fifth of the Majors together with DJ Static, Negash Ali, Nat III and J-Spliff.

== Solo work ==
- 1996: The Whole Mess (LP)
- 1999: The Whole Mess part 2 (1999) (LP)
- 1999: The Whole Mess parts 1 & 2 (1999) (CD)
- 2000: Fantastic feat. Maylay Sparks / it's a demo 2000 feat. Freestyle (12")

== Collaborations ==
- 1996: Various Artists / RAPOMANIA vol. 1 (CD)
- 1996: Drop Dead - Hip Hop Til Folket / (CD / LP)
- 1999: Double Mouth / Rhymes Ahead (CD)
- 1999: Various Artists / Global Networking (CD)
- 1999: Massinfluence / The Underground Science (CD / LP)
- 2001: Urban Broadcast / Live Transmission (12")
- 2001: Various Artists / ScandalNavia vol. 1 (CD)
- 2002: Nobody Beats The Beats / Nobody Beats The Beat (CD)
- 2003: Nobody Beats The Beats / Nobody Beats The Beat The Second Coming (CD / LP)
- 2003: Danskrap.dk / Så Ka’ I Lære Det (CD)
- 2004: Nobody Beats The Beats / Nobody Beats The Beat Drops From Above (CD)
- 2004: Various Artists / Cph Claimin' Respect #2 (12")
- 2004: Freestyle / Etched in Stone (CD / LP)
- 2005: Various Artists / Ciphersounds vol. 1 (Free MP3)
- 2006: Beatman & Rockin' / Who's Supa Now (CD)
- 2006: Static & Nat Ill / Teamwork (CD / LP)
- 2007: Per Vers feat DJ Noize / Vers 64.0 (a two player game) (CD mixtape)
- 2007: Various Artists / Flamingo Files Vol.1 (mixed by DJ Noize) (CD)
- 2008: Majors / Majors (CD / LP)
- 2007: "Noget Saerligt", "We Fell", "Come Down Jesus" & "The Dream", Gabriel Flies records (single)
- 2010: KVBeats / The Résumé (LP)
