= Nobody Beats The Beats =

Danish musical collective

Nobody Beats The Beats is a Danish musical collective founded by DJ Typhoon of Boulevard Connection fame.

The members have collaborated on three albums with the Nobody Beats The Beats name, distributed by Typhoon's Sonny B Recordings.

Despite being a popular underground act, the group have also had hits on Danish radio.

== Guest appearances ==
- Black Thought
- Brand Nubian
- Grand Puba
- Guru (rapper)
- Madlib
