= Joanna Natasegara =

British film director and producer

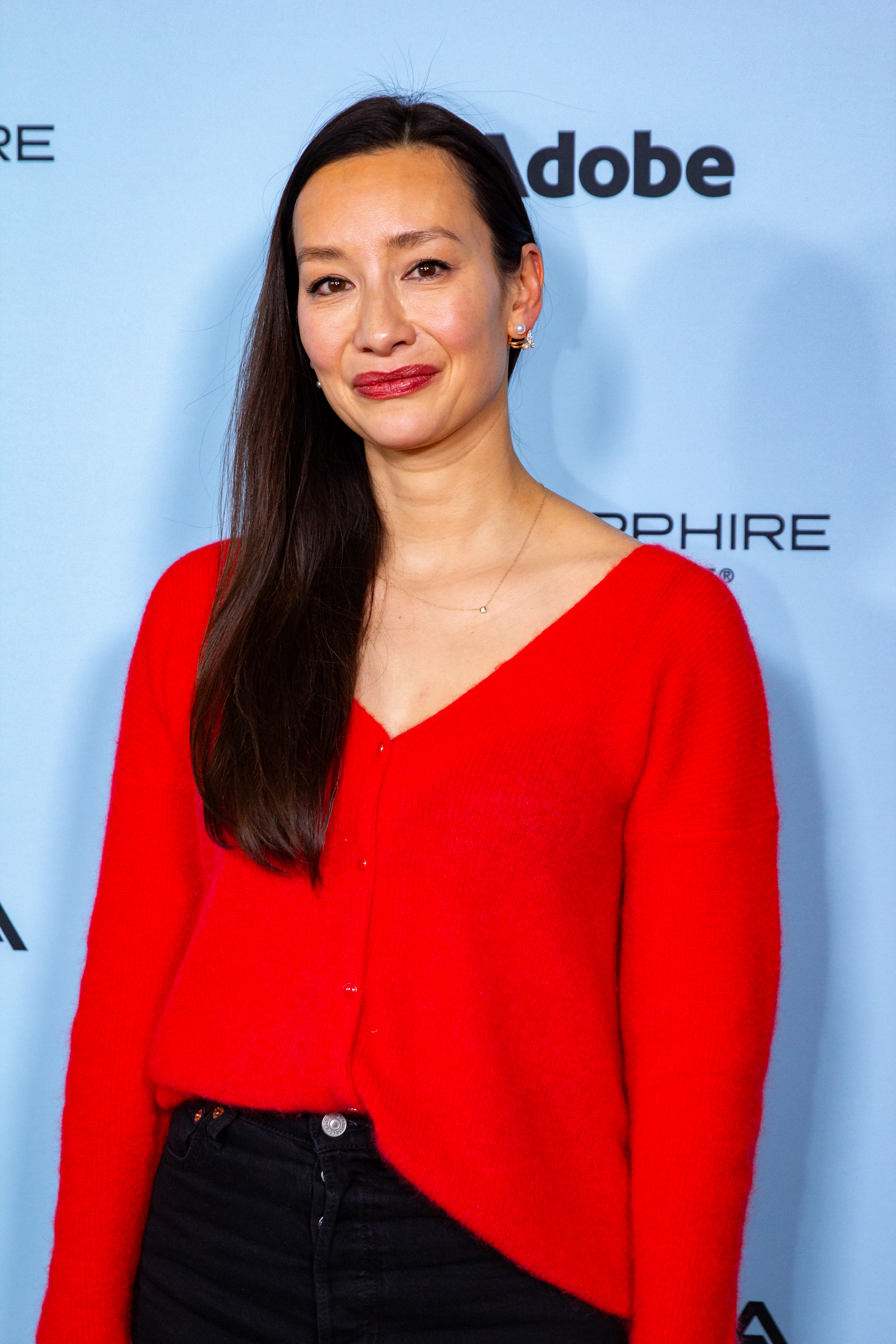
- Natasegara at the 2025 Sundance Film Festival
- Born: Joanna Grace Natasegara; October 1980 (age 45–46)
- Education: Cardiff University (BA); London School of Economics (MSc)
- Years active: 2007–present

Joanna Natasegara (born October 1980) is an English film director and producer. She produced Virunga (2014) and The White Helmets (2016), for which she received nominations for Academy Award in the categories of Best Documentary Feature and Best Documentary (Short Subject), respectively; she won the latter. Both nominations were shared with director Orlando von Einsiedel. She also worked on The Price of Kings, a documentary film series with each film focusing on a specific world leader.

She founded her London-based production company Violet Films in 2014. Natasegara made het feature directorial debut with The Disciple, a documentary film about hip hop group the Wu-Tang Clan's one-of-a-kind album Once Upon a Time In Shaolin.

== Early life and education ==
From Manchester, she grew up in Chorlton and Whalley Range and attended Withington Girls' School. She went on to graduate from Cardiff University in 2003 with a Bachelor of Arts (BA) in Religious and Theological Studies. She then completed a Master of Science (MSc) in Human Rights at the London School of Economics (LSE) in 2005.

== Selected filmography ==
- The Price of Kings: Oscar Arias (2012)
- The Price of Kings: Shimon Peres (2012)
- The Price of Kings: Yasser Arafat (2012)
- Virunga (2014)
- The White Helmets (2016)
- Evelyn (2018)
- The Edge of Democracy (2019)
- Heart of Invictus (2023)
- The Disciple (2026)
