= It All Comes Down to This (mixtape) =

It All Comes Down To This

Mixtape by Remedy
- Released: December 7, 2010
- Recorded: 2010
- Genre: Hip hop
- Length: 39:28
- Label: APRC
- Producer: Ross Filler, RZA

Remedy chronology
Code Red (2003)	It All Comes Down To This (2010)

It All Comes Down To This is the name of the first mixtape by Wu-Tang Clan affiliated Remedy, released on December 7, 2010, on APRC Records. Originally released as a full-length studio album, it was later released as a free mixtape download. Guests include R.A. the Rugged Man, Trife Diesel, Killah Priest and Hell Razah among other Wu-Tang Clan affiliates.

== Track list ==
Confirmed by iTunes and Amazon.com.

1. "Hip Hops Holiest" (Intro) (0:53)
2. "Streets are Watchin'" (2:04)
3. "Saturday Night" (featuring Trife Diesel) (1:53)
4. "You Ain't a Hustler" (2:33)
5. "Transporting" (featuring JoJo Pellegrino) (2:41)
6. "2010 Re-Emergence" (featuring King Just) (2:01)
7. "Black and White Millionares" (featuring King Just & Lounge Lo) (2:03)
8. "Mob Pirates" (2:24)
9. "Sinnin'" (featuring Shawn Wigs & JoJo Pellegrino) (2:29)
10. "Tonites Still The Nite" (1:08)
11. "Behind Those Eyes" (featuring AC) (2:20)
12. "Testimony" (featuring Killah Priest) (3:23)
13. "Never Again"/"Flashback" (0:41)
14. "I Love My Land" (Nas Remix) (featuring Nas) (1:03)
15. "All A Dream" (1:03)
16. "StupidDumbRetarted" (featuring King Just & Lounge Lo) (2:22)
17. "Startin' Something" (featuring King Just, Solomon Childs) (2:36)
18. "Posse Cut" (Remix) (featuring R.A. the Rugged Man, Hell Razah, JoJo Pellegrino & Blaq Poet) (2:41)
19. "Ambush"/"Revisited" (1:02)
20. "The Duelist" (0:52)
21. "Danger" (Outro) (1:06)
