= Cilvaringz =

Dutch-Moroccan record producer and artist manager (born 1979)

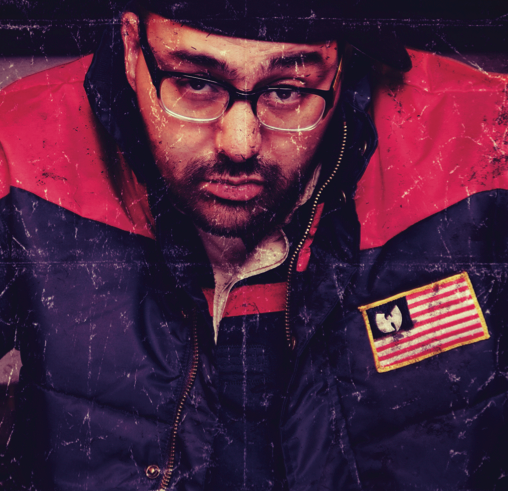

Background information
- Also known as: Cilvaringz
- Born: Tarik Azzougarh; January 29, 1979 (age 47); Dordrecht, South Holland, Netherlands
- Origin: Tilburg, North Brabant, Netherlands
- Genre: Hip hop
- Occupations: Record producer; rapper; artist manager
- Instrument: Vocals
- Years active: 1992–present
- Labels: Wu-Tang; Universal
- Website: scluzay.com

Tarik Azzougarh (Arabic: طارق أزوگاغ; born January 29, 1979), better known by his stage name Cilvaringz, is a Dutch-Moroccan record producer, rapper, and artist manager from Tilburg, North Brabant. He is associated with the Wu-Tang Clan and is best known for conceptualizing and producing the world's most expensive work of music, Wu-Tang Clan's Once Upon a Time in Shaolin.

Cilvaringz was discovered by Ol' Dirty Bastard and Method Man at a Wu-Tang Clan concert in Amsterdam, Netherlands, on May 26, 1997. After impressing ODB with a live freestyle on stage he was introduced to RZA who signed him to Wu-Tang Records in 1999, becoming the first non-American affiliate of the Wu-Tang Clan.

Between 2002 and 2010 Cilvaringz toured the world as the official opening act of RZA, Method Man & Redman, Raekwon and Ghostface Killah. On April 9, 2007, he released his first solo album through five different record labels around the world, receiving critical acclaim for its return to the original Wu-Tang sound.

In April 2008 Cilvaringz conceptualized and began producing Wu-Tang Clan's secret album Once Upon a Time in Shaolin under the patronage of RZA. The unique release of the secret album as only one available copy in the world became one of the biggest and widely covered music stories of 2014. Forbes magazine broke the story exclusively on March 26, 2014. On May 3, 2015, the album sold for a reported US$2 million to pharmaceutical entrepreneur Martin Shkreli, making it the most expensive musical work ever sold.

== Early life ==
Cilvaringz was born in Dordrecht, South Holland and lives in the city of Tilburg.

== Discovery by Wu-Tang Clan ==
On May 26, 1997, the Wu-Tang Clan performed at the Melkweg in Amsterdam as part of the Wu-Tang Forever promo tour. As the concert came to an end Wu-Tang Clan members Ol' Dirty Bastard and Method Man announced a freestyle session for local talent. Cilvaringz rushed to the stage but could not reach it due to the excitement of many fans. Ol' Dirty Bastard spotted Cilvaringz struggling from the side and pulled him up on stage, giving him his microphone. Capturing the attention of the entire group and crowd with his freestyle, he was pulled to the side by Method Man and Ol' Dirty Bastard and then introduced to RZA who was watching the freestyle from the side of the stage. When a fight broke out between the Wu-Tang Clan and a group of fans whose girlfriends were getting undressed by Ol' Dirty Bastard on stage, security rushed in and cleared the stage. Not knowing how to get backstage Cilvaringz lost contact with RZA. After that, he traveled multiple times to New York looking for RZA. According to Cilvaringz, RZA had just told him that he was interested in signing him to Wu-Tang Clan's extended group the Wu-Tang Killa Beez.

== RPEG Ltd ==
In 2002, Cilvaringz launched his entertainment company RPEG Ltd which organized tours and booked live performances for various artists.

In 2006, RPEG Ltd expanded its services into management and guided the careers of Arab rappers Salah Edin, Eslam Jawaad, Ledr P from Sweden, Moroccan producer DJ Van and American producer Focus..., the son of Chic bassist Bernard Edwards who at the time was the only producer signed to Dr. Dre's imprint Aftermath Entertainment. In managing their careers, RPEG Ltd collaborated with De La Soul, Damon Albarn, Gorillaz, IAM, Sefyu, Mala Rodriguez and others.

In 2007, RPEG Ltd served as the executive producer for Salah Edin's debut album Nederlands Grootste Nachtmerrie which became the most controversial album in the history of Dutch Hip Hop music, also winning the Best Dutch Album Award. Later that year, Jive/Epic France and RPEG Ltd collaborated on the production of French artist La Fouine's second album Aller-Retour.

In 2008, RPEG Ltd and lawyer Margriet Koedooder sued Dutch politician Geert Wilders for wrongfully portraying the image of the artist Salah Edin in the controversial anti-Islam movie Fitna. The court ruled in favor of Salah Edin and awarded 10.000 euros in copyright infringement and defamation damages. It was the first time Wilders lost a lawsuit.

In 2010, RPEG Ltd teamed up with Universal Music Spain for the production of Mala Rodriguez's fourth studio album Dirty Bailarina. Focus was enlisted to produce the majority of the album. Dirty Bailarina won two Latin Grammy Awards for Best Urban Music Album and Best Urban Song.

== Once Upon A Time In Shaolin ==
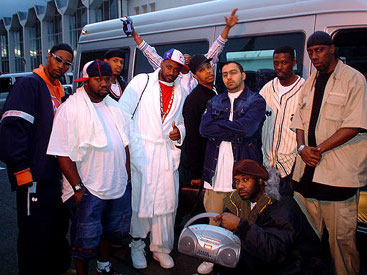
Photo of the Wu-Tang Clan in 2004. Cilvaringz is the third person standing from the right.

In 2014, Cilvaringz and RZA announced the release of Once Upon a Time in Shaolin, a Wu-Tang Clan album that was recorded in secret over a period of six years and of which only one single copy exists.

On May 3, 2015, the album sold to controversial pharmaceutical entrepreneur Martin Shkreli for a reported two million dollars, making it the most expensive musical work ever sold in the history of music. Martin Shkreli's identity as the buyer was kept secret until Bloomberg News revealed his identity in November 2016. When Martin Shkreli was arrested for securities fraud allegations a few weeks later the FBI was prompted to tweet about the album's fate. It became the FBI's most liked and most retweeted tweet.

=== The Disciple documentary ===
In January 2026, a documentary film about Cilvaringz's career and life titled The Disciple, directed by British filmmaker Joanna Natasegara, premiered in Sundance Film Festival. The film follows and documents Cilvaringz's role in the creation of the Wu-Tang Clan’s one-copy album Once Upon a Time in Shaolin. It follows his journey from a huge Wu-Tang fan in the Netherlands to becoming the first non-American affiliate of the Wu-Tang Clan. The documentary focuses on the conception, production, and sale of Once Upon a Time in Shaolin, an album cited as the most expensive and most controversial work of music.

== Film ==
Cilvaringz played a small role in the movie Shouf Shouf Habibi. He also appeared in the theme song of the movie.

== Discography ==
=== Studio albums ===
Artist	Album	Label & Year
Cilvaringz	I	Wu-Tang Records / RPEG Ltd / Universal / Babygrande / Entak Japan / Nocturne France, 2007

Instrumental Albums

Artist	Album	Label & Year
Cilvaringz	The Mental Chambers	RPEG Ltd / wutangcorp.com Release Only, 2001
Cilvaringz	The Third Chamber	RPEG Ltd / Unofficial Internet Release, 2002
Cilvaringz	I	RPEG Ltd / Digital Release Only, 2017
Cilvaringz	The Mental Chambers V	RPEG Ltd / Digital Release Only, 2017

Singles

Artist	Album	
Cilvaringz	The B-Sides	feat. The RZA, 4th Disciple, Beretta 9 & Bronze Nazareth
Cilvaringz	The Stone, The Gun & The Book	feat. The RZA, Blue Raspberry & Remedy
Cilvaringz	The Weeping Tiger [DJ Van Remix]	feat. Raekwon, The RZA & Ghostface Killah

Executive Produced Albums

Artist	Album
Cilvaringz	I
Salah Edin	Nederlands Grootste Nachtmerrie
Salah Edin	Horr – The Album
Eslam Jawaad	The Mammoth Tusk
Wu-Tang Clan	Once Upon a Time in Shaolin

Executive Produced Singles

Artist	Album
Manal	Koulchi Ban
Manal	Nah. feat. Shayfeen
Manal	Taj
Manal	Slay
DJ Van	Ma Khasser Walou feat. Hanane El Khader & Mehdi Mozayine

=== Videography ===
Artist	Song	Credit	Director(s)
RZA	Chi Kung	Appearance	Joseph Kahn
Skrillex	Fuck That	Appearance	Nabil Elderkin
Fnaire	Yed El Henna	Producer	Ivan Herrera
Salah Edin	Vrouwtje Is Een Bitch	Treatment / Appearance	Ivan Herrera
Salah Edin	Geliefd Om Gehaat Te Worden	Treatment / Appearance	Ivan Herrera
Salah Edin	Nsani Ya Habibi	Treatment	Ivan Herrera
Salah Edin	Tfoe [Remix]	Producer / Treatment / Appearance	Matt Alonzo
Salah Edin	Gena Tahtha Aqdama Al Qumahat	Producer / Treatment / Acting	Matt Alonzo
Eslam Jawaad	Pivot Widdit	Treatment / Appearance	Ivan Herrera
Manal	Koulchi Ban	Producer / Assistant Director / Treatment	Frank Telli
Manal	Taj	Producer / Treatment / Director	Cilvaringz
Manal	Nah	Producer / Treatment / Director	Cilvaringz
Manal	Slay	Treatment	Said Naciri
Van feat. Hanane El Khader & Mehdi Mozayine	Ma Khasser Walou	Producer / Treatment / Director	Cilvaringz
