= Negash Ali =

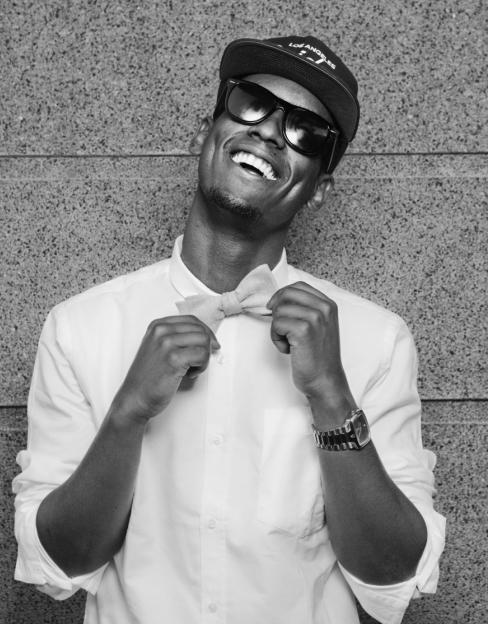

Background information
- Origin: Eritrea
- Genres: Urban, Hip Hop, R&B
- Occupations: Artist, Rapper, Producer & Songwriter; publishing: Warner/Chappell Music

Negash Ali is an Eritrean artist signed to Warner Chappell Music. Negash have released 3 albums (Majors, Asmarino, GettoPOP) and have worked with names such as Chris Brown, Bob Sinclar, Manu Dibango and many more.

== Life and career ==
In 1990 during the conflict between Eritrea & Ethiopia, at the age of just 16 Negash’ mother was forced to flee to Europe, having to make the tough decision of leaving her husband behind, who was working at a busy local hospital. Already mother to a 1-year-old daughter and pregnant with Negash, she dreamt of a better life in Europe.

The family spent 5 years in various refugee camps before being granted asylum in 1995.

History:

Negash' breakthrough came when he was 16 and joined the successful group Majors, which consisted of Negash and DMC winner Dj Noize. The album was critically acclaimed and the group performed at such places as Roskilde, Popkomm, Splash & HipHopKemp.

The following year Negash’ debut album Asmarino was released in Europe & the US. The album paved the way for performances in Los Angeles, Paris, London, Stockholm, Berlin and Cairo in cooperation with Livenation.

His sophomore effort ”GettoPOP” was met with good reviews and a nomination for "Best Urban Album of the Year". The first single "In This Club" was received well by radio and reached number 5 on the Urban DanceChart.

His EP The African Dream released on his own label 10Thousand Music. It combines influences from his Muslim home and western world he grew up in. The lyrics often focus on the feeling of not completely belonging to either place, but instead becoming a combination of the two. The EP also touches on other subjects such as personal struggles, love, frustration, ambition, etc.

His 2014 EP "The Collage" also released via 10Thousand Music saw Negash both producing & performing the whole record. The EP has put Negash on the international map with support from Big Boy, The Guardian, The Source, The Huffington Post, Interview Mag & BBC Radio 1Xtra.

== Discography ==
=== Albums ===
- 2008: Majors
- 2009: Asmarino
- 2012: GettoPOP

=== EPs ===
- 2015: The Collage EP
- 2014: The African Dream EP
- 2013: London Calling EP
