= Wisemen (rap group) =

American hip-hop group

The Wisemen
- Origin: Detroit, Michigan, United States
- Genres: Hip-hop
- Years active: 2007 - present
- Label: Black Day In July
- Members: Bronze Nazareth; Kevlaar 7 (deceased in 2014); Salute the Kidd (Incarcerated until 2023); June Megalodon; Phillie; Illah Dayz; Lord Jessiah

The Wisemen is a hip-hop group formed by Wu-Tang Clan affiliate Bronze Nazareth and his brother, the lyricist and producer Kevlaar 7, who died on December 23, 2014, from a blood disorder.

== Music career ==
They are known for soulful, jazzy, gritty instrumentals and polished, dense, thought-provoking lyrics depicting life in the city of Detroit, Michigan. The group consists of emcee/producer Bronze Nazareth, emcee/producer Kevlaar 7, and emcees Phillie, Salute the Kid, Illah Dayz, and June Megalodon. The latter two artists did not appear on the group's debut album.

=== 2007: Wisemen Approaching ===
The group released their debut album, Wisemen Approaching, on February 27, 2007, which featured Wu-Tang Clan member GZA as well as Killah Priest, Vast Aire, Planet Asia, Prodigal Sunn, and more. The album was fully produced by Wisemen members and siblings, Bronze Nazareth and Kevlaar 7.

=== 2010: Children of a Lesser God ===
Their second album, entitled Children of a Lesser God was released on October 26, 2010, and features guest appearances by Raekwon, Planet Asia, Big Rube of The Dungeon Family, and more. The album features production from Bronze Nazareth and Kevlaar 7, as well as live instrumentation from the band Project Lionheart.

== Discography ==
=== Albums ===
- Wisemen Approaching (Babygrande Records, 2007)
- Children of a Lesser God (Babygrande Records, 2010)
