= List of Wu-Tang Clan affiliates =

The following is a list of Wu-Tang Clan affiliates, collectively known as the Wu-Tang Killa Bees (occasionally spelled "Beez", an appellation originating from the 1998 compilation RZA presents Wu-Tang Killa Bees: The Swarm, Volume 1). These are artists that are at times promoted, supported, or produced by the members of the hip-hop group Wu-Tang Clan, and/or groups formed by Clan members as side projects. The association of these artists with the Clan varies considerably both in nature and over time.

These affiliates also include the Clan's group of in-house producers known as the Wu-Elements. This originally referred to the group who assisted RZA with the production of the Clan's second album Wu-Tang Forever, on which some production duties were delegated to True Master, 4th Disciple and Clan member Inspectah Deck. However, although he was not credited for production on Wu-Tang Forever, the traditional definition of Wu-Elements usually also includes Allah Mathematics due to his long-time involvement with the Clan as both a producer and DJ as well as his prolific input as a producer on the group's second round of solo projects between 1997 and 2000. Since 2000, the usage of the term "Wu-Elements" has tended to include close affiliate producers Bronze Nazareth and Cilvaringz.

== Groups ==
=== A.I.G. ===
A.I.G. is a duo composed of Allah Wise (a.k.a. The Wizard), and Darkim Be Allah. The group, whose name stands for "Allah Is God", debuted on the Wu-Tang Killa Bees: The Swarm compilation with the track "Bronx War Stories". An album titled Retaliation Strike was completed but was never released, a situation which eventually caused the group to leave the Clan and pursue an independent route. They eventually released their debut Fame Labs Presents in 2005.

=== American Cream Team ===
The American Cream Team were created in 1999. They consist of Chip Banks (died November 25, 2000), Polite (died August 1, 2023) (who would join Rae's second group Ice Water Inc.), Lord Superb (died October 9, 2018) (who was featured on Rae and Ghost albums), Twiz (who would later become part of Ghost's Theodore Unit), Triflyn (St. Lunatics affiliate and DJ for Nelly), RhymeReck, and producers Arkatech Beatz. Raekwon featured American Cream Team on two songs on his second album Immobilarity. Much of that album was produced by Arkatech Beatz and Triflyn. They were notably the first offspring crew of a member of Wu-Tang Clan proper. The group also made several appearances on mixtapes and compilations, including a track titled "It's Not A Game" produced by Arkatech Beatz on the soundtrack to the film Black and White which was played over the film's credits, and a track on Funkmaster Flex's The Mix Tape, Vol. III mixtape. Members of the group also made appearances on albums by Raekwon's fellow Clansmen Ghostface Killah's Supreme Clientele. After 50 Cent dissed the Wu, along with others, on his infamous track "How to Rob", Polite and Lord Superb responded with a track called "Who the Fuck is 50 Cent?" followed by Raekwon's Clyde Smith skit off of Ghostface Killah's album. Before Chip Banks' death, he worked on several songs including "Ain't Nobody" (featuring Billystone), "Club Life", "Everywhere We Go", "Hold Your Head", "Heavyweight Champion", "World Order" (featuring Outlawz), "Flashbacks" & "Niggas Don't Die". Banks died on November 25, 2000 due to a shooting over a money dispute, and Cream Team split up. Like many Wu affiliates, American Cream Team completed an album, "Only In America", but it has never been released (despite being advertised in the liner notes of other Wu-Tang releases). Since then, Lord Superb & Twiz have been incarcerated, though both were finally able to release a few official mixtapes. Rhyme Recka continues to record solo material and released an album titled The Autobiography of Rapper X in 2008.

=== Black Knights ===
One of the many Wu-affiliates to debut on The Swarm compilation, the Californian group Black Knights was originally associated with the group North Star (also from California) with whom they recorded as Black Knights of the North Star. However, the groups have since separated. The group originally consisted of Crisis, Doc Doom (deceased), Rugged Monk and Holocaust (deceased). Holocaust changed moniker to Warcloud and left the group in 2001 to concentrate on a solo career and his many collaborations outside the Wu-empire, which include a long-running fellowship with underground collective Da Monstar Mob (w/ producer Skarekrow) and, in 2006, Blue Sky Black Death.

In 2001, the Black Knights released their debut album in only promo form Every Night Is A Black Knight with limited distribution, and also reunited with NorthStar for the closing song (titled "Black Knights of the North Star") on NorthStar's debut album. In 2005, they re-released their debut to worldwide distribution through CHAMBERMUSIK.com. Doc Doom was shot and killed in Compton, CA, on February 11, 2007. A compilation album of old and new material appeared in 2010. Their song "Caught Up" was in the 2007 anime television series Afro Samurai in episode 3 with a slightly different beat and added instrumentation. Rugged Monk and Crisis recorded a trio of albums along with Red Hot Chili Peppers guitarist John Frusciante: The Medieval Chamber, The Almighty, and Excalibur.

=== Black Market Militia ===
Consists of Killah Priest (Sunz Of Man), Tragedy Khadafi, William Cooper, Timbo King (Royal Fam) and Hell Razah (Sunz Of Man).

=== Brooklyn Zu ===
A group closely affiliated with Ol' Dirty Bastard. The group includes King Merdy (Murdoc), Raison the Zu Keeper, 12 O'Clock, Buddha Monk, Shorty Shitstain. They released an album in 2008 titled Chamber #9, Verse 32. Murdoc and 12 O'Clock were murdered in Portland, Oregon, in 2021.

=== Tha Beggas/ The Beggaz Clan ===
Washington D.C. natives. Father Lord was featured on Killah Priest's "Tai Chi" along with Hell Razah and 60 Second Assassin off the album "Heavy Mental" and Sunz Of Man's "Sign Of The Time" along with Timbo King of Royal Fam. Jah-King(LongFist) worked for Razor Sharp Records and Wu Tang Records as the DMV Street Team. Tha Beggas (misspelled on "The Swarm" as "The Beggaz" and "Wu-tang Collective" as "The Beggarz"), is a collective of hip-hop artists and groups that was featured on "RZA Presents: Wu-Tang Killa Bees - The Swarm Volume 1", on a song titled "On The Strength". This song was re-released on a separate Wu-Tang compilation album called Wu-Tang Collective in 2003.

Some of the artists include Long Axe (Black Lotus), Dragonfly (Black Lotus), Mega Soul, Scorpion, Samo Heung, Begga Ooh, Longfist, Bolo Gah (Actual Facts), Buda Love (Actual Facts), Jim Kelly (Black Lotus), Majik Sword, Short Axe (Dragon's Pitchfork / Yukon Black) and the founder, Father Lord aka "Wu Chi" (Actual Facts).

Two prominent songs that have leaked since his return are "Get Something" & "Deadly Act" (featuring his younger brother Prince Hasaan). One of Lord's many aliases is Wu-Chi. Lord was killed in a car accident on June 13, 1997. Some members of the group have also released projects under the name Hidden Aspects, an entity formed by Begga Ooh & Yukon Black. There have also been solo projects from Dragonfly, Long Axe(under the name Digital Kwan), Bolo, Begga Ooh, Samo Heung (under the name Sammy Bravo) and Short Axe (under the names Yukon Black, Dragon's Pitchfork & with the crew he founded after leaving Tha Beggas, GRYSKLL). Bolo (DJ King Cee), the producer of "On the Strength" released the first collaborative album from the group titled "Blood Sweat and Years"

=== C.C.F. Division ===
A group consisting of Freemurda, ShaCronz and Terra Tory. They had features on RZA's Birth of a Prince and appeared on Popa Wu's Visions of the Tenth Chamber in 2000.

=== Da Manchuz ===
A group affiliated with Buddha Monk and Brooklyn Zu. The group consists of Drunken Dragon, Espionage (deceased), War, Babyface Fensta, Chilli Black, Lee-Major, G-Note$, Professor King Bean (deceased), and Born U Majesty. They released one album, Manchuz Dynasty, in 2007.

=== Dirty Clanzmen ===
A group affiliated with Brooklyn Zu formed by Dungeon Masta in 2007. The group consists of Dungeon Masta, Dizzy Dizasta, Manny Macgyver, Struxx Denali, Lex Bi-Polar (Deceased), Eddi3 Hizpanik, Karnage Ca$hMan, Smuve Massbeatz, Sage Badweather, Elijah Divine, Dj Iceman and Ern Dawg (Deceased).

In 2009 Dungeon Masta released the first project "Dungeon Masta Presents Da Dirty Clanzmen" Meet The Family Vol 1 distribution through Sohlopro Records / Chambermusik Special Products as an introduction of what is to come. In 2016 Dirty Clanzmen released their debut album The Dirty Truth on audiomack one year after the released of the mixtape compilation "Dirty Clanzmen presents The X Tape" on Sohlopro Records / Chambermusik Special Products. Dirty Clanzmen re-released "The Dirty Truth" in 2020. The Latest project they released is titled "The Legacies Project"

=== Harlem 6 ===
A group, also known as Harlem 6 Wu-Tang, whose name pays tribute to the memory of the Harlem Six (six men from Harlem, New York, who were put on trial in March 1965.) The main members are God "AGR" Harrison, Lord "Black Jesus" Harrison, Ruben "Young Man" Rosario, and Omar "Khilly Mo" Daniels. There are also supporting members.

=== Hillside Scramblers ===
A group affiliated with U-God. Their original members included King Just, Leatha Face, Inf-Black, Kawz, Desert Eagle, Black Ice & singer Autumn Rae. Members now consist of Leatha Face, Inf-Black, Kawz, & Desert Eagle. They released their debut album, U-Godzilla Presents The Hillside Scramblers, in 2004. Leatha Face released his debut mixtape Dog Will Hunt through Chambermusik and is working on his debut album.

=== House Gang ===
A group affiliated with Inspectah Deck and made up of rappers D.C., La Banga, P.C., Carlton Fisk and Fes Taylor. They released one project in 2004 titled UndaDogz Vol. 1: House Gang Animalz and have appeared on other mixtapes including the "Back to Sicily" mixtape of Hanz On collectively in 2012.

=== K.G.B. ===
K.G.B. (short for Klik Ga Bow) is a group made up of rappers Asiatic, Ill Knob, Infaredda, Hip Hop and DJ Kenny Kenn. They released a few singles and appeared on songs by other Wu-Tang affiliates.

=== M.M.O. ===
A group made up of rappers Bam-Bam, Itchy Fingas Sha, Trigg-nomm, Pearl Handles, and Naisha. They released their first album All About the Money in 2003.

=== Orphanage ===
A group consisting of members 4th Disciple, Beretta 9, Lord Superb, associate of Rae, Ghost, and ShoGun Assason. Not to be confused with the underground group associated with Definitive Jux and Rhymesayers Entertainment.

=== Othorized F.A.M. ===
A group consisting of members Shawn Wigs, Lounge Lo, Molly Q, and Crunch Lo. They had gained an underground following and are known mostly through their affiliation with Cappadonna, who is Lounge Lo's brother.

=== Two On Da Road ===
A group composed by 12 O'Clock, Prodigal Sunn. They made numerous guest appearances on various Wu-Tang Clan affiliates albums like Return to the 36 Chambers, Iron Flag and The Great Migration.

== Rappers ==
=== 12 O'Clock ===
Along with 4th Disciple and others, 12 O'Clock was one of the Wu affiliates whose connections to the group went back to before their fame. Behind the scenes in the making of the Clan's debut album and on Wu-related albums since, he has made a few guest appearances, including on the Clan's group album Iron Flag in 2001. 12 O'Clock performed with Ol' Dirty Bastard on the track "Ol' Dirty's Back" (from the soundtrack to the 1995 film Tales from the Hood), while his duet with Raekwon, "Nasty Immigrants", appears on the soundtrack to the 1996 film The Nutty Professor. He was a member of the Brooklyn Zu clique and also made up half of the duo 2 On The Road with Prodigal Sunn. He was shot and killed on August 10, 2021.

His birth name is Odion Turner; he was also known as Billy Box. He appeared on "Protect Ya Neck II: The Zoo", Ol' Dirty Bastard, Return To The 36 Chambers: The Dirty Version (1995), "Wu Blood-Kin", La The Darkman, Heist Of The Century (1998); "Ghetto Syringe", Wu-Syndicate, Wu-Syndicate (1999); "Chrome Wheels", Wu-Tang Clan, Iron Flag (2001); "Rough Cut", GZA, Legend of the Liquid Sword (2003); "It's My Life" & "Manhunt", Prodigal Sunn Return of the Prodigal Sunn (2005); and Bronze Nazareth's "The Great Migration".

=== Armel ===
Armel is a member of Ancient Coins, A&R and The Cra-Z 88z. He was signed to GZA's label Liquid Swords Entertainment. He made his first high-profile appearance on the track "Rough Cut" on GZA's album Legend of the Liquid Sword in 2002. He formed the group A&R with Sharecka of Royal Fam. He released Armel Presents: Ancient Coins in 2003.

=== Buddha Monk ===
A member of Brooklyn Zu who has worked prolifically as a rapper and producer for Wu-Tang affiliates including Da Manchuz, Zu Ninjaz, and Hitzmen. Buddha Monk has released The Prophecy (1998), Unreleased Chambers (2008) and The Dark Knight (2013), as well as various mixtapes.

=== Darkim Be Allah ===
Darkim Be Allah (born February 11, 1976) formed A.I.G. with AllahWise and released their self-titled debut-album in 2005 on Fame Labs Records. Mostly known for producing RZA solo song from The Gravediggaz' album The Pick, The Sickle & The Shovel in 1997. In 2000, he released an 8-track EP called Live at the Lab: Take 1 through mp3.com. 2008 saw Fame Labs release The Manhattan Project, a compilation which heavily featured Darkim Be Allah. Live At The Lab: Take 2 is a 15-track album produced by Darkim and featuring various members of the Fame Labs crew including AllahWise, 36Zero and Darkim.

=== Krumbsnatcha ===
Krumbsnatcha was formerly a member of the Gang Starr Foundation. Krumbsnatcha was then signed by John "Mook" Gibbons under the Wu-Tang Management. Krumbsnatcha released the single Killer in Me in 1999 which debuted at No. 42 on the Billboard charts. In October 2001 Krumbsnatcha made a collaboration with M.O.P., placing on the Billboard charts at No. 27. He placed on the Billboard charts again in 2002, debuting at No. 47 in the first week with Respect All Fear None.

=== Lord Superb ===
Originally a member of Raekwon's Cream Team, he became close with Ghostface Killah and his crew. He appeared on Rae and Ghost albums, standing out particularly in Supreme Clientele. He has since cut ties with the Wu, and served time in jail. He has brashly stated that he gave Ghost his style, and felt abandoned when Rae's Cream Team came to an end. He has since released official mixtapes. In October 2018, Lord Superb died at the age of 41.

=== Lounge Lo ===
Also known as Lounge Mode, he is Cappadonna's younger brother and a member of the Othorized F.A.M., he is formally signed to Code Red Entertainment. Lounge has been connected with the Wu since their beginning; his earliest reference was on GZA's Pass The Bone and was also featured on Meth Vs. Chef on Method Man's debut album Tical.

=== Popa Wu ===
Popa Wu, also known as Freedum Allah, was a cousin of RZA. An adherent of Five Percenter ideology, he served as a mentor and advisor to the members of the Wu-Tang Clan in their early days. Popa Wu compiled the 2000 album Visions of the 10th Chamber and was the subject of a film by Khalik Allah.

He died in 2019 at the age of 63.

=== Remedy ===
Remedy is a rapper and hip-hop producer. He is known for being the first white and the first Jewish rapper to be affiliated with the Wu-Tang Clan. He owns and runs Code Red Entertainment, his label which released Cappadonna's The Struggle album. He also served as executive producer on Inspectah Deck's album Manifesto. Remedy has produced and been featured on various works for ESPN. He released a mixtape, It All Comes Down to This. He is the co-executive producer of the Wu-Tang Killa Bees: Return Of The Swarm album.

=== Sav Killz ===
Sav Killz is an emcee, writer, and rapper. He got his start as part of the Wu-Tang Clan cypher and was connected to Popa Wu, learning how to rap at 36 Chambers Studio and Restoration Plaza.

=== Solomon Childs ===
Solomon Childs is a Staten Island artist closely associated with various members of the Wu. Backed by the RZA in combination with his brother Divine (CEO of Wu Music Group). He released his debut album entitled The Voice of the People in 2009.

Solomon Childs released single "As The World Turns" on Canadian Hip Hop Label UIYB Records (founded by Lenny Diko) in 2010.

A close associate of Cappadonna and Remedy, he was once part of Theodore Unit before going completely solo. He originally rapped under the moniker Killa Bamz, and has continued releasing albums with features by numerous affiliates, as well as forming his own label. Solomon is part of the group and experimental project with other Wu-Tang affiliates called School of the Gifted as his alter ego Red Heroin. In 2013, Solomon Childs appeared on the single Bang To The Death by Mike ADHD featuring Ruste Juxx, Kromeatose, Fes Taylor and Solomon Childs.

=== Warcloud / The Holocaust ===
Born Anthony Creston Brown (March 10, 1979 – December 29, 2024), Warcloud was a west coast Wu-Tang Clan affiliate and former member of the group Black Knights (when he was known as Holocaust, the Signs of Hell's Winter).

He was known by the aliases Holocaust, Alcatraz and Robot Tank. He released five albums: Nightmares That Surface from Shallow Sleep, Smuggling Booze in the Graveyard, Blue Sky Black Death Presents: The Holocaust in collaboration with production duo Blue Sky Black Death, Theatre of Pain, in collaboration with American Poets 2099, and Holocaust as Robot Tank - The Signs of Hells Winter. Since 2019 he was releasing albums independently online. He died on December 29, 2024, at the age of 45.

=== Young Dirty Bastard ===
Young Dirty Bastard is Ol' Dirty Bastard's eldest son. He toured with the Wu-Tang Clan during their 2007 tours. Under the guidance of his uncle, RZA, he has recorded three mixtapes. He was also featured on Brand Nubian member Lord Jamar's debut solo album The 5% Album, on the track "Young Godz", together with GZA's son Young Justice and Lord Jamar's son Young Lord. Young Dirty Bastard released his first album in 2011 entitled Food Stamp Celebrity Vol. 1.

He released his single Welfare on November 15, 2011. He continues to tour with the Wu-Tang Clan, spreading the legacy of his father, O.D.B. He is featured on Gore Elohim's album "Electric Lucifer". YDB also was featured in Mike ADHD's "Frag Out" music video. As of 2022, Young Dirty Bastard continues to tour with the Wu-Tang Clan, with featured appearances on the New York State of Mind tour alongside Nas and Busta Rhymes.

== Singers ==
=== Allah Real ===
An Al Green-style singer who was featured on RZA's 2003 studio album Birth of a Prince. He made appearances on Ghostface Killah's The Pretty Toney Album, Masta Killa's debut No Said Date as well as both Mathematics albums. He released his mixtape Real Estate in 2005 through CHAMBERMUSIK. He was born on December 29, 1955, and died on March 14, 2018, aged 62.

== Producers ==
=== John the Baptist AKA BAPGOD ===
Born as John Hitchman Jr., he has produced albums for GZA, Killah Priest, U-God, Royal Fam, Sunz of man, Ol Dirty Bastard, RZA and Olori Manns. He is currently managing his own company Deadly Venoms Productions / BAPGOD RECORDS.

=== DJ Iceman ===
Producer and DJ who has Production credits for Hell/Heaven Razah, Solomon Childs, Dungeon Masta, Eternal Of West Coast Killa Beez and throughout the Wu-Files and Wu-Tang Rockz The World mixtape series.
