= Wu-Chronicles =

Compilation album by Wu-Tang Clan
- Released: March 23, 1999
- Recorded: 1994–99
- Genre: Hip hop
- Length: 1:09:14
- Label: Wu-Tang; Priority
- Producer: Andrew Shack (exec.); Mark Copeland (exec.); RZA (also exec.); Easy Mo Bee; E-Swift; Havoc; John "Smoke" Turner; Self; Smokin' Joe

Wu-Tang Clan chronology
The Swarm (1998)	Wu-Chronicles (1999)	Wu-Chronicles Chapter II (2001)

Professional ratings
Review scores
Source	Rating
AllMusic	3/5 stars
Christgau's Consumer Guide	(neither)
NME	2.5/5 stars
RapReviews	6/10
The Encyclopedia of Popular Music	3/5 stars

Wu-Chronicles is a compilation album by American hip hop group Wu-Tang Clan and their affiliates. It was released on March 23, 1999, via Wu-Tang/Priority Records and includes several previously released tracks performed, produced or featured by Wu-Tang artists. Its sequel, Wu-Chronicles Chapter II, was released in 2001.

== Track listing ==
No.	Title	Writer(s)	Producer(s)	Length
1.	"4th Chamber" (performed by GZA, Ghostface Killah, RZA and Killah Priest; originally from Liquid Swords, 1995)	Gary Grice; Robert Diggs; Dennis Coles^{[a]}; Clifford Smith Jr.	RZA	4:36
2.	"Wu-Gambinos" (performed by Raekwon, Ghostface Killah, Method Man, RZA and Masta Killa; originally from Only Built 4 Cuban Linx..., 1995)	Corey Woods; D. Coles^{[a]}; C. Smith Jr.^{[a]}; R. Diggs; Elgin Turner^{[a]}	RZA	5:40
3.	"The What" (performed by Notorious B.I.G. and Method Man; originally from Ready to Die, 1994)	Christopher Wallace; C. Smith Jr.; Osten Harvey^{[a]}	Easy Mo Bee	3:58
4.	"Cold World (Remix)" (performed by GZA, D'Angelo, Inspectah Deck and Streetlife; originally from Liquid Swords, 1995)	G. Grice; Jason Hunter; R. Diggs; Stevie Wonder	RZA	4:28
5.	"Tragedy" (performed by RZA; originally from Rhyme & Reason: Original Motion Picture Soundtrack, 1997)	R. Diggs; Derek Harris	RZA; True Master^{[b]}	3:48
6.	"Black Trump" (performed by Cocoa Brovaz and Raekwon; originally from The Rude Awakening, 1998)	Darrell Yates Jr.; Tekomin Williams; C. Woods; Desmond Wray; Edward Hinson	Self	4:20
7.	"Hip Hop Drunkies" (performed by Tha Alkaholiks and Ol' Dirty Bastard; originally from Likwidation, 1997)	James Robinson; Rico Smith; Eric Brooks; Russell Jones; Marlon Williams	E-Swift	4:54
8.	"Gunz 'n Onez (Iz U Wit Me)" (performed by Heltah Skeltah and Method Man; originally from Magnum Force, 1998)	Jahmal Bush; Sean Price; C. Smith Jr.; John Turner	Smoke	4:18
9.	"Latunza Hit" (performed by Wu-Syndicate; originally from Wu-Syndicate, 1999)	Timothy Turner	Smokin' Joe	4:06
10.	"Wake Up" (performed by Killarmy and Sunz of Man; originally from Silent Weapons for Quiet Wars, 1997)	Jeryl Grant; Terrance Hamlin; Rodney Stevenson; Chron Smith; Vergil Ruff; R. Diggs	RZA	5:02
11.	"Young Godz" (performed by Shyheim, Madman, Rubbabandz, Killa Sin and Raekwon; originally from The Lost Generation, 1996)	Shyheim Franklin; T. Hamlin; Javahn Barry; R. Diggs	RZA	5:11
12.	"Right Back at You" (performed by Mobb Deep, Ghostface Killah, Raekwon and Big Noyd; originally from The Infamous..., 1995)	Albert Johnson; Kejuan Muchita; D. Coles; C. Woods; TaJuan Perry	Havoc	4:54
13.	"Whatever Happened (The Birth)" (performed by AZ and RZA; originally from Pieces of a Man, 1998)	Anthony Cruz; R. Diggs	RZA	3:38
14.	"Semi-Automatic: Full Rap Metal Jacket" (performed by Inspectah Deck, U-God and Streetlife; originally from High School High: The Soundtrack, 1996)	J. Hunter; Lamont Hawkins; Patrick Charles; R. Diggs	RZA	4:02
15.	"The End" (performed by Ras Kass and RZA; originally from Rasassination, 1998)	John Austin; R. Diggs; O. Harvey	Easy Mo Bee	4:20
16.	"'96 Recreation (Demo)" (performed by Cappadonna, RZA and Ol' Dirty Bastard)	Darryl Hill; R. Diggs; R. Jones		3:22
Total length:				1:09:14

Notes

- ^{^[a]} signifies an uncredited songwriter
- ^{^[b]} signifies a co-producer

== Charts ==
Chart (1999)	Peak position
Dutch Albums (Album Top 100)	80
Dutch Compilation Albums (Compilation Top 30)	24
German Albums (Offizielle Top 100)	55
US Billboard 200	25
US Top R&B Albums (Billboard)	16
