= Wu-Chronicles, Chapter 2 =

Wu-Chronicles, Chapter II

Compilation album by Wu-Tang Clan
- Released: July 3, 2001
- Recorded: 1994–2001
- Studio: 36 Chambers Studio (New York, NY); 36 West Studio (Los Angeles, CA); The Wake Up Show
- Genre: East Coast hip hop; hardcore hip hop
- Length: 1:07:56
- Label: Wu-Tang
- Producer: Mark Copeland (exec.); RZA (also exec.); 4th Disciple; Arabian Knight; Blackjack; D'Angelo; DJ Premier; DJ Spooky; Fatal Son; Junior; King Tech; Marcus "NorthStar" Logan; P.C.; Ravi Rason; True Master

Wu-Tang Clan chronology
Wu-Chronicles (1999)	Wu-Chronicles, Chapter II (2001)	The Sting (2002)

Professional ratings
Review scores
Source	Rating
AllMusic	2.5/5 stars
HipHopDX	3/5
laut.de	4/5 stars
RapReviews	6/10

Wu-Chronicles Chapter II is a compilation album by American hip hop group Wu-Tang Clan and their affiliates. It was released on July 3, 2001 via Wu-Tang/Priority Records and includes several previously released tracks performed, produced or featured by Wu-Tang artists, serving as a sequel to 1999's Wu-Chronicles.

== Track listing ==
No.	Title	Writer(s)	Producer(s)	Length
1.	"Above the Clouds" (performed by Gang Starr and Inspectah Deck; originally from Moment of Truth, ℗ 1998)	Keith Elam; Chris Martin; Jason Hunter	DJ Premier	3:45
2.	"Re-Up" (performed by Two Da Road and Shyheim; ℗ 2001)	Vergil Ruff; Shyheim Franklin	Ravi Rason	3:29
3.	"Hip Hop Fury" (performed by GZA, RZA, Hell Razah, Timbo King and Dreddy Kruger; originally from Beneath the Surface, ℗ 1999)	Gary Grice; Robert Diggs; Chron Smith; Timothy Drayton; James Dockery; Suleyman Ansari	Arabian Knight	3:44
4.	"Got's Like Come on Thru" (performed by Buddha Monk, Ol' Dirty Bastard and Drunken Dragon; originally from The Big Hit (Original Motion Picture Soundtrack), ℗ 1998)	Ellery Chambers; Drunken Dragon; Marcus Logan; Robert James	North Star	4:36
5.	"In Trouble" (performed by Shyheim; ℗ 2001)	Franklin	Sandman	4:23
6.	"Three Amigos (If It's On)" (performed by King Just, Method Man and Sic; ℗ 2000)	Adrian Angevin; Clifford Smith; R. Erdards	Junior	3:37
7.	"N.Y.C. Everything" (performed by RZA and Method Man; originally from Bobby Digital in Stereo, ℗ 1998)	Diggs; Clifford Smith	RZA	4:16
8.	"Rumble" (performed by U-God, Leatha Face, Inspectah Deck and Method Man; originally from Golden Arms Redemption, ℗ 1999)	Lamont Hawkins; Orlando Irizarry; Hunter; Clifford Smith; Derek Harris	True Master	4:30
9.	"Dangerous Mindz" (performed by Gravediggaz; originally from The Pick, the Sickle and the Shovel, ℗ 1997)	Diggs; Arnold Hamilton; Anthony Ian Berkeley; Selwyn Bougard	RZA; 4th Disciple	4:54
10.	"To the Rescue" (performed by U-God and Leatha Face; ℗ 2001)	Hawkins; Irizarry	True Master	4:00
11.	"Greyhound, Pt. 2 (GZA Remix)" (performed by the Jon Spencer Blues Explosion and Killah Priest; originally from Experimental Remixes, ℗ 2000)	Jon Spencer; Judah Bauer; Russell Simins		3:22
12.	"Catechism" (performed by DJ Spooky and Killah Priest; ℗ 2001)	Walter Reed; Paul Miller	DJ Spooky	1:55
13.	"Left & Right" (performed by D'Angelo, Redman and Method Man; originally from Voodoo, ℗ 1999)	Michael Eugene Archer; Reginald Noble; Clifford Smith; Jonathan Davis	D'Angelo	5:38
14.	"Eyes a Bleed (RZA Remix)" (performed by Bounty Killer and Masta Killa; ℗ 1996)	Rodney Price; J. Scilipoti; Paul Yebuah; Elgin Turner		4:44
15.	"Hard to Kill" (performed by Spice 1 and Method Man; originally from AmeriKKKa's Nightmare, ℗ 1994)	Robert Lee Greene, Jr.; Clifford Smith; Gentry Reed	Black Jack	4:01
16.	"Wu-Tang Clan Live Freestyle" (performed by GZA and Masta Killa; ℗ 2001)	Grice; Turner	King Tech	3:45
17.	"Only 4 My Niggaz" (performed by Black Knights; ℗ 2001)	Quintarus Bennett; Dante Cunningham; Dewayne Rose; H. Saquir	PC	3:17
Total length:				1:07:56

Sample credits

- Track 4 contains portions of "Winding River" written by Robert James

== Charts ==
Chart (2001)	Peak position
US Billboard 200	72
US Top R&B/Hip-Hop Albums (Billboard)	31
