= The Sting (Wu-Tang Clan album) =

Studio album by Wu-Tang Clan & Wu-Tang Killa Beez
- Released: March 12, 2002
- Genre: Hip-hop
- Length: 69:57
- Label: Wu-Tang; In the Paint; Koch

Wu-Tang Clan & Wu-Tang Killa Beez chronology
Wu-Chronicles Chapter II (2001)	The Sting (2002)

Professional ratings
Review scores
Source	Rating
Allmusic	2/5 stars
RapReviews	6/10 stars

The Sting is a 2002 album by various artists affiliated with or part of the Wu-Tang Clan.

== Track listing ==
Track listing information is taken from the official liner notes and AllMusic.

The Sting
No.	Title	Writer(s)	Producer(s)	Length
1.	"Intro"	R. Diggs	The RZA	2:01
2.	"Killa Beez" (Feat. Bobby Digital, U-God, Inspectah Deck, Suga Bang Bang)	R. Diggs; L. Hawkins; J. Hunter; B. Elliott	The RZA	3:58
3.	"Out Think Me Now" (Introducing Solomon Childs)	R. Diggs; W. Dale	The RZA	3:31
4.	"Bar Mitzvah" (Introducing Black Knights)	M. Johnson; D. Cunningham; D. Rose; Q. Bennett	Six Mill	4:32
5.	"Doe Rae Wu" (Feat. Bobby Digital, ODB, Kinetic)	J. Hitchman; R. Diggs; R. Jones; S. Murray	John The Baptist	2:34
6.	"Bluntz, Martinez, Girlz, & Gunz" (Introducing War Cloud)	R. Diggs; A. Brown	The RZA	4:01
7.	"Dancing With Wolves" (Feat. Killarmy)	S. Bougard; T. Hamlin; D. Delvalle; S. Murray; J. Grant; J. Alexander; R. Stevenson	4th Disciple	4:38
8.	"Spend Money" (Introducing Lord Superb Feat. Intrigue)	R. Diggs; J. Cummings	The RZA	4:49
9.	"Take Up Space" (Introducing Lord Superb, Solomon Childs)	R. Diggs; W. Dale; J. Cummings	The RZA	3:47
10.	"Rollin" (Feat. Bobby Digital, Black Knights)	R. Diggs; D. Cunningham; D. Rose	Doc Doom	3:48
11.	"Get At Me" (Feat. Black Knights, Shyheim, Two On The Road)	A. Collin; Q. Bennett; D. Cunningham; D. Rose; S. Franklin; O. Turner; V. Ruff	F1	3:59
12.	"Spit That G" (Feat. Cappadonna, Solomon Childs, Prodical, Timbo King, Suga Bang Bang)	R. Diggs; D. Hill; W. Dale; V. Ruff; T. Drayton; B. Elliott; O. Turner	The RZA	4:24
13.	"Woodchuck" (Feat. North Star, Royal Fam, Cilvaringz, War Cloud, Black Knights)	R. Diggs; R. Grier; A. Johnson; T. Drayton; T. Azzougarh; A. Brown; Q. Bennett	The RZA	4:23
14.	"G.A.T." (Feat. Black Knights, North Star, Solomon Childs, 12' Clock, Shyheim, RZA)	R. Diggs; D. Cunningham; D. Rose; R. Grier; A. Johnson; W. Dale; O. Turner; S. Franklin	The RZA	4:51
15.	"Hatin' Don't Pay" (Introducing Free Murder, PC, Shacronz)	N. Greenaway; H. Faquir; F. Drayton; S. Drayton	PC	4:02
16.	"When You Come Home" (Feat. Shyheim)	R. Diggs; S. Franklin	The RZA	4:13
17.	"KB Ridin'" (Feat. Wu-Tang Clan, Shacronz, Suga Bang Bang)	R. Diggs; C. Smith; D. Coles	The RZA	5:54
Total length:				69:57

The Sting – Bonus CD
No.	Title	Writer(s)	Producer(s)	Length
1.	"Odyssey" (Feat. Isaac Hayes Band)	R. Diggs	The RZA	5:29
2.	"Thirsty (Skit)"	R. Diggs; S. Murray	The RZA	1:39
3.	"Digi-Electronics" (Feat. Bobby Digital, Timbo King, Shyheim, Doc Doom, Madam Scheez)	R. Diggs; T. Drayton; S. Franklin; F. Drayton; D. Cunningham	The RZA	5:08
4.	"Billy"	R. Diggs	The RZA	2:29
5.	"RZA Beat"	R. Diggs	The RZA	1:30
6.	"La Rhumba (Re-Mix)" (Feat. Fat Joe, Bobby Digital, Method Man)	J. Cartegena; R. Diggs; C. Smith	True Master	3:11
Total length:				19:26

Notes

- "Killa Beez" features uncredited vocals by Blue Raspberry.
- "Doe Rae Wu" erroneously lists Kinetic as featured rapper.
- "Dancing With Wolves" featured uncredited vocals by Prodical of the Sunz of Man.
- "KB Ridin'" does not feature the entire Wu-Tang Clan, but only raps by Method Man and Ghostface Killah.
- "Odyssey" features raps by Bobby Digital.
- "Thirsty (Skit)" features raps by Bobby Digital and Kinetic.
- "Digi-Electronics" features raps by Free Murder.
- "Billy" features raps by Bobby Digital.
