= Don't Go Against the Grain =

Studio album by GP Wu
- Released: January 27, 1998
- Recorded: 1997
- Genre: Hip hop
- Length: 57:54
- Label: MCA
- Producers: Gary "Silky" Davis (exec.); Daddy-O (exec.); Hank Shocklee (exec.); Pop Da Brown Hornet (exec.); Down Low Recka (also exec.); June Luva (also exec.); Rubbabandz (also exec.); RNS; Visible

Singles from Don't Go Against the Grain
- 1. "Party People" Released: September 23, 1997

Don't Go Against the Grain is the only studio album by American hip hop group GP Wu. It was released on January 27, 1998, through MCA Records.

== Background ==
One of many affiliates of the Wu-Tang Clan, GP Wu consisted of Pop da Brown Hornet (cousin of Wu-Tang Clan member Ghostface Killah), June Luva, Down Low Recka and Rubbabandz. The group had officially come together on Shyheim's 1996 album The Lost Generation. The group then signed with MCA Records and began work on Don't Go Against the Grain. "Black on Black Crime" and "1st Things First" were both released as singles and had music videos released, however neither made it to the Billboard charts. The production was mostly handled by group member Down Low Recka, with additional production done by group member June Luva, RNS and Visible. Hank Shocklee of the Bomb Squad served as the executive producer for the album.

== Reception ==
Professional ratings
Review scores
Source	Rating
AllMusic	2.5/5 stars
Entertainment Weekly	B
RapReviews	6.5/10
The Source	3/5 stars

Don't Go Against the Grain was not a commercial success and remains one of the least successful Wu-Tang affiliated albums. It only reached No. 44 on the Top R&B/Hip-Hop Albums and No. 15 on the Top Heatseekers, not selling enough copies to chart on the Billboard 200.

Critically, reviews for the album were mixed. AllMusic gave the album 2.5 stars out of 5, stating that "the four members of GP Wu do a good job of replicating the Wu-Tang sound, but fail to live up to the somewhat lofty standards the rap conglomerate has established. Don't Go Against the Grain is a very consistent effort, overflowing with the style that is so distinct to hardcore East Coast rap. Consistency, however, is not necessarily genius. While the album is not completely forgettable, it fails to be particularly memorable either". Entertainment Weekly gave the album a B, stating: "GP Wu maintain Wu-Tang's quality and gritty authenticity without jacking their sound".

== Track listing ==
1. "Smoking" - 4:13
2. "1st Thing First" - 3:30
3. "Two Gats Up" - 4:00
4. "Blow Up" - 4:32
5. "Party People" - 3:53
6. "If You Only Knew" - 5:05
7. "Hit Me With That Shit" - 3:53
8. "Hip Hop" - 4:27
9. "Chamber Danger" - 3:27
10. "Underground Emperor" - 3:07
11. "Life Bid" - 5:39
12. "Don't Go Against the Grain" - 4:05
13. "Things Ain't What They Used to Be" - 4:32
14. "Black on Black Crime" - 3:29

== Charts ==
Chart (1998)	Peak position
US Top R&B/Hip-Hop Albums (Billboard)	44
US Heatseekers Albums (Billboard)	15

== Personnel ==
- Isaac Booker – main artist, producer, recording, executive producer, production coordinator
- James Wilson – main artist, producer, executive producer, production coordinator
- Javahn Barry – main artist, producer, executive producer, production coordinator
- Robert Briggs – main artist, executive producer, production coordinator
- Arby Tyrone "RNS" Quinn – producer, mixing, recording
- Visible – producer
- Gary "Silky" Davis – executive producer, production coordination
- Glenn Bolton – executive producer, A&R direction
- Hank Shocklee – executive producer
- Chris Barnett – recording, mixing
- Carlton Batts – mastering
