= Wu-Syndicate (album) =

Studio album by Wu-Syndicate
- Released: April 20, 1999
- Recorded: 1998
- Genre: Hip hop
- Length: 1:11:08
- Label: Wu-Tang; Priority
- Producer: RZA (exec.); DJ Devastator; Dred; Mathematics; Smokin' Joe

Wu-Syndicate chronology
Wu-Syndicate (1999)	Grimlenz (2010)

Wu-Tang Records Presents... Myalansky & Joe Mafia in Wu-Syndicate is the debut studio album by American hip hop group Wu-Syndicate. It was released on April 20, 1999, through Wu-Tang Records with distribution via Priority Records. The production was handled by DJ Devastator, Smokin' Joe, Mathematics and Dred, with RZA serving as executive producer. It features guest appearances from fellow Wu-Tang affiliates 12 O'Clock, KGB and Trigga. The album debuted at number 61 on the US Billboard 200 albums chart.

== Critical reception ==
Professional ratings
Review scores
Source	Rating
AllMusic	3/5 stars
NME	7/10
The Source	3/5 stars

Ralph Parfect of NME praised the song "Where Was Heaven" and considered Joe Mafia's rhymes to be "fluent" and "dizzying". AllMusic's Keith Farley commented on the album's production and considered it "far from the worst Wu-Tang cash in". Jonathan Bonanno of The Source praised the group's "emotional lyrics" that "paint vivid cinematic pictures of street tales, gun battles and flashbacks to the yayo-slanging dreams", but thought they get repetitive as the group lacked experience. He highlighted the production, which he called "prodigious", for its "harmonious guitar riffs and eerie, piano-accompanied bass lines".

== Track listing ==
Track listing information is taken from the official liner notes and AllMusic. No individual song writing credits are given. All songs produced by DJ Devastator, except where noted.

Wu-Syndicate
No.	Title	Performer(s)	Length
1.	"Thug War"	Joe Mafia; Myalansky; Napoleon	5:15
2.	"Pointin' Fingers" (produced by Mathematics)	Joe Mafia; Myalansky	4:22
3.	"Global Politics"	Joe Mafia; Myalansky; Napoleon; 12 O'Clock	4:00
4.	"VA Cats"	Joe Mafia; Myalansky	4:12
5.	"Metropolis"	Joe Mafia	3:51
6.	"Golden Sands"	Joe Mafia; Myalansky	3:47
7.	"Crime Syndicate"	Joe Mafia; Myalansky; Napoleon	3:58
8.	"Where Was Heaven"	Myalansky	3:22
9.	"Ice Age" (produced by Dred)	Joe Mafia; Myalansky; Napoleon	4:15
10.	"Ghetto Syringe"	Joe Mafia; Myalansky; Napoleon; 12 O'Clock	3:10
11.	"Young Brothas"	Joe Mafia; Myalansky	3:21
12.	"Weary Eyes" (produced by Dred)	Joe Mafia; Myalansky; Napoleon	5:02
13.	"Muzzle Toe" (produced by Mathematics)	Joe Mafia; Myalansky	4:13
14.	"Ask Son"	Joe Mafia; Myalansky	2:17
15.	"Wings of Life"	Joe Mafia; Myalansky	3:57
16.	"Lutunza" (produced by Smokin' Joe)	Myalansky	4:08
17.	"Bust a Slug" (produced by Smokin' Joe)	Joe Mafia; Myalansky; Ill Knob; Trigga	4:40
18.	"The Hit" (produced by Smokin' Joe)	Joe Mafia; Myalansky; Napoleon	3:18
Total length:			1:11:08

== Personnel ==
- Joseph K. Outlaw a.k.a. Joe Mafia – rap vocals (tracks: 1–7, 9–15, 17–18)
- Timothy Eugene Turner a.k.a. Myalansky – rap vocals (tracks: 1–4, 6–16, 18)
- Corey Hart a.k.a. Napoleon – rap vocals (tracks: 1, 3, 7, 9, 10, 12, 18)
- Odion Turner a.k.a. 12 O'Clock – rap vocals (tracks: 3, 10)
- Thomas Cassidy a.k.a. Trigga – rap vocals (track 17)
- Klik Ga Bow – rap vocals (track 17)
- David "DJ Devastator" Walker – producer (tracks: 1, 3–8, 10, 11, 14, 15)
- Ronald Maurice Bean – producer (tracks: 2, 13)
- E the Dred – producer (tracks: 9, 12)
- Smokin' Joe – producer (tracks: 16–18)
- Robert Fitzgerald Diggs – executive producer
- Nolan 'Dr. No' Moffitte – engineering
- Michele "Michou" Robinson – art direction, design

== Charts ==
Chart (1999)	Peak position
US Billboard 200	61
US Top R&B Albums (Billboard)	18
