= On and On (Shyheim song) =

Single by Shyheim

from the album AKA the Rugged Child
- Released: November 30, 1993
- Recorded: 1993
- Genre: Hip hop; Hardcore hip hop
- Length: 3:47
- Label: Virgin; EMI
- Songwriter(s): Shyheim Dionel Franklin; Arby Tyrone Quinn; James Wilson
- Producer(s): RNS

Shyheim singles chronology
"On and On" (1993)	"Pass It Off" (1994)

Music video
- "On and On" on YouTube

"On and On" is a song recorded by American hip-hop rapper Shyheim. It was released as the first single from his 1994 album, AKA the Rugged Child.

The song was a moderate hip-hop hit, charting at #89 on the Billboard Hot 100. It was released as a single in 1993, several months before the album release in April 1994.

== Background ==
The song samples the 1987 hit Top Billin' by Audio Two and 1993's The Garden Freestyle by Big Daddy Kane, The Notorious B.I.G., 2Pac, Scoob Lover, and Shyheim himself.

== Samples and covers ==
The song is sampled in the 1996 song "Yes Yes Yo" by DJ Cam.

== Charts ==
Chart (1993–94)	Peak position
U.S. Billboard Hot 100	89
U.S. Billboard Hot R&B/Hip-Hop Songs	58
U.S. Billboard Dance Singles Sales	24
U.S. Billboard Hot Rap Songs	17
