= Dirty Weaponry =

Studio album by Killarmy
- Released: August 11, 1998
- Recorded: 1998
- Genre: Hip hop
- Length: 47:09
- Label: Wu-Tang; Priority
- Producer: RZA (exec.); 4th Disciple; Mathematics; Russ Prez

Killarmy chronology
Silent Weapons for Quiet Wars (1997)	Dirty Weaponry (1998)	Fear, Love & War (2001)

Singles from Dirty Weaponry
- 1. "The Shoot Out" Released: 1998

Alternative cover

Professional ratings
Review scores
Source	Rating
AllMusic	4/5 stars

Dirty Weaponry is the second studio album by American hip hop group Killarmy. It was released on August 11, 1998, through Wu-Tang/Priority Records.

== Background ==
Production was mainly handled by member 4th Disciple, except for two tracks that were produced by Allah Mathematics and a track produced by Russ Prez, with the RZA serving as executive producer. It features guest appearances from Wu-Tang Clan affiliate Black Knights member the Holocaust. The album peaked at number 40 on the Billboard 200 and number 13 on the Top R&B/Hip-Hop Albums in the United States.

== Track listing ==
Dirty Weaponry
No.	Title	Writer(s)	Producer(s)	Length
1.	"Galactics"	Rodney Stevenson; Samuel Craig Murray; Domingo J. Del Valle; Terrance Hamlin; Ronald Maurice Bean	Allah Mathematics	4:38
2.	"Allah Sees Everything"	Stevenson; Del Valle; Hamlin; Selwyn Bogard	4th Disciple	3:34
3.	"5 Stages of Consciousness"	Jeryl Grant; Del Valle; Murray; Stevenson; Hamlin; Jamal Alexander; Bogard	4th Disciple	4:36
4.	"Unite to Fight"	Hamlin; Alexander; Bogard	4th Disciple	2:03
5.	"Murder Venue"	Grant; Del Valle; Murray; Hamlin; Bogard	4th Disciple	3:48
6.	"Doomsday" (featuring the Holocaust)	Anthony Creston Brown; Del Valle; Hamlin; Bogard	4th Disciple	3:31
7.	"Red Dawn"	Del Valle; Murray; Hamlin; Bogard	4th Disciple	3:47
8.	"The Shoot Out"	Grant; Stevenson; Murray; Del Valle; Bogard	4th Disciple	2:23
9.	"Bastard Swordsman" (featuring the Holocaust)	Del Valle; Hamlin; Alexander; Brown; Bean	Allah Mathematics	4:20
10.	"Last Poet"	Stevenson; Del Valle; Hamlin; Russell Pressley	Russ Prez	3:28
11.	"Serving Justice"	Grant; Delvalle; Hamlin; Bogard	4th Disciple	3:25
12.	"Where I Rest At"	Grant; Murray; Alexander; Bogard	4th Disciple	3:31
13.	"Pain"	Grant; Stevenson; Murray; Hamlin; Alexander; Bogard	4th Disciple	4:05
Total length:				47:09

== Personnel ==
- Terrance "9th Prince" Hamlin – performer (tracks: 1–7, 9–11, 13)
- Domingo "Dom Pachino" Del Valle – performer (tracks: 1–3, 5–11, 13)
- Samuel "Beretta 9" Murray – performer (tracks: 1, 3, 5–8, 12)
- Rodney "Islord" Stevenson – performer (tracks: 1–3, 5, 8, 10)
- Jeryl "Killa Sin" Grant – performer (tracks: 3, 5, 8, 11–13)
- Jamal "ShoGun Assasson" Alexander – performer (tracks: 3, 4, 9, 12)
- Anthony "Warcloud" Brown – performer (tracks: 6, 9)
- Selwyn "4th Disciple" Bougard – producer (tracks: 2–8, 11–13), mixing, arranging
- Ronald "Mathematics" Bean – producer (tracks: 1, 9)
- Russell "Russ Prez" Pressley – producer (track 10)
- Robert "RZA" Diggs – executive producer
- Rachelle Clinton – photography
- Sherin Baday – coordinator
- Arlene Godfrey – coordinator
- Jeff Trotter – A&R

== Charts ==
Chart performance for Dirty Weaponry
Chart (1998)	Peak position
US Billboard 200	40
US Top R&B/Hip-Hop Albums (Billboard)	13
