= The Swarm (album) =

Compilation album by Wu-Tang Killa Bees
- Released: July 21, 1998
- Recorded: 1997–1998
- Studio: Alien Flyers (New York, NY); Firehouse Studio (New York, NY)
- Genre: Hip-hop
- Length: 1:01:15
- Label: Wu-Tang; Priority
- Producer: Bolo Gah; Darkim Be Allah; DJ Devastator; Inspectah Deck; Mathematics; Remedy; RZA; The Blaquesmiths

Wu-Tang Killa Bees chronology
The Swarm (1998)	Wu-Chronicles (1999)

Professional ratings
Review scores
Source	Rating
AllMusic	3/5 stars
The Village Voice	(1-star Honorable Mention)

The Swarm is the first compilation album by American hip-hop collective Wu-Tang Killa Bees. It was released on July 21, 1998, via Wu-Tang/Priority Records. Recording sessions took place at Alien Flyers Studios and Firehouse Studios in New York. Production was handled by Wu-Tang Clan member the RZA, who also served as an executive producer and presenter. The album also featured additional production from The Wu-Elements, such as Mathematics, Darkim Be Allah, Bolo Gah, DJ Devastator, Inspectah Deck, Remedy and The Blaquesmiths.

It features contributions from Wu-Tang Clan members Cappadonna, Ghostface Killah, Inspectah Deck, Masta Killa, Method Man, Raekwon and RZA, and Wu-Tang affiliates A.I.G., Black Knights of the North Star, Killarmy, Remedy, Royal Fam, Ruthless Bastards, Shyheim, Street Life, Sunz of Man, Tha Beggas and Wu-Syndicate among others.

In the United States, the album debuted at number 4 on the Billboard 200 and number 3 on the Top R&B/Hip-Hop Albums charts. It was certified gold by the Recording Industry Association of America on February 10, 1999, for the sales of 500,000 units.

== Track listing ==
No.	Title	Writer(s)	Producer(s)	Length
1.	"Intro"			0:30
2.	"The Legacy" (performed by Royal Fam)	Timothy Drayton; Robert Diggs	RZA	2:20
3.	"Concrete Jungle" (performed by Sunz of Man)	Chron Smith; Frederick Cuffie; Vergil Ruff; Diggs	RZA	4:41
4.	"Co-Defendant" (performed by Shyheim and Hell Razah)	Shyheim Franklin; Chron Smith; Diggs	RZA	4:37
5.	"S.O.S." (performed by Inspectah Deck and Street Life)	Jason Hunter; Patrick Charles	Inspectah Deck	3:42
6.	"Execute Them" (performed by Raekwon, Inspectah Deck, Street Life and Masta Killa)	Corey Woods; Hunter; Charles; Elgin Turner; Diggs	RZA	3:40
7.	"Bronx War Stories" (performed by A.I.G.)	G. Hall; Donnie Banks	Darkim Be Allah	3:27
8.	"And Justice for All" (performed by RZA, Killarmy and Method Man)	Diggs; Rodney Stevenson; Samuel Murray; Terrance Hamlin; Clifford Smith	RZA	4:55
9.	"Punishment" (performed by Black Knights of the North Star)	Quintarus Bennet; Reginald Dimeko; Deshawn Dante Cunningham; Dewayne Rose; Anthony Brown; Andre Johnson; Ronald Bean	Mathematics	4:54
10.	"Bastards" (performed by Ruthless Bastards)	M. Perry; M. White; Robert Daniels; S. Daniels; D. Logan; Mike McDonald; Jorell Brand	The Blaquesmiths	4:19
11.	"On the Strength" (performed by The Beggaz)	T. Taylor; T. Frost; P. Fondille; R. Griffin; R. Brown	Bolo Gah	5:01
12.	"Cobra Clutch" (performed by Ghostface Killah)	Dennis Coles; Bean	Mathematics	3:42
13.	"Never Again" (performed by Remedy)	Ross Filler	Remedy	4:09
14.	"Where Was Heaven" (performed by Wu-Syndicate)	Timothy Turner; Joseph Outlaw; Corey Hart; David Walker	DJ Devastator	3:28
15.	"'97 Mentality" (performed by Cappadonna and Ghostface Killah)	Darryl Hill; Coles; Diggs	RZA	3:41
16.	"Fatal Sting" (performed by Black Knights of the North Star)	Bennet; Dimeko; Cunningham; Rose; Brown; Johnson; Bean	Mathematics	4:09
Total length:				1:01:15

Notes

- The "Intro" mentioned on the back cover, booklet and disc is not featured on the record itself.
- Track "Legacy" incorrectly listed as performed by A.I.G. in the booklet.

== Personnel ==
- Timothy "Timbo King" Drayton – vocals (track 2)
- Chron "Hell Razah" Smith – vocals (tracks: 3, 4)
- Frederick "60 Second Assassin" Cuffie – vocals (track 3)
- Vergil "Prodigal Sunn" Ruff – vocals (track 3)
- Shyheim Franklin – vocals (track 4)
- Jason "Inspectah Deck" Hunter – vocals (tracks: 5, 6), producer (track 5)
- Patrick "Streetlife" Charles – vocals (tracks: 5, 6)
- Corey "Raekwon" Woods – vocals (track 6)
- Elgin "Masta Killa" Turner – vocals (track 6)
- A.I.G. – vocals (track 7)
- Robert "RZA" Diggs – vocals (track 8), producer (tracks: 2–4, 6, 8, 15), executive producer
- Rodney "Islord" Stevenson – vocals (track 8)
- Samuel "Beretta 9" Murray – vocals (track 8)
- Terrance "9th Prince" Hamlin – vocals (track 8)
- Clifford "Method Man" Smith – vocals (track 8)
- Quintarus "Crisis" Bennet – vocals (tracks: 9, 16)
- Reginald "Meko the Pharaoh" Dimeko – vocals (tracks: 9, 16)
- Deshawn Dante "Doc Doom!" Cunningham – vocals (tracks: 9, 16)
- Dewayne "Rugged Monk" Rose – vocals (tracks: 9, 16)
- Anthony "Holocaust" Brown – vocals (tracks: 9, 16)
- Andre "Christ Bearer" Johnson – vocals (tracks: 9, 16)
- Apocalipps – vocals (track 10)
- Blizzard – vocals (track 10)
- Iron Mic – vocals (track 10)
- Sha Gotti – vocals (track 10)
- Robert "Truck" Daniels – vocals (track 10)
- Buda Love – vocals (track 11)
- Dragonfly – vocals (track 11)
- Long Axe – vocals (track 11)
- Samo Heung – vocals (track 11)
- Dennis "Ghostface Killah" Coles – vocals (tracks: 12, 15)
- Ross "Remedy" Filler – vocals & producer (track 13)
- Timothy "Myalansky" Turner – vocals (track 14)
- Joseph "Joe Mafia" Outlaw – vocals (track 14)
- Corey "Napoleon" Hart – vocals (track 14)
- Darryl "Cappadonna" Hill – vocals (track 15)
- Donnie "Darkim Be Allah" Banks – producer (track 7)
- Ronald "Allah Mathematics" Bean – producer (tracks: 9, 12, 16)
- Mike McDonald – producer (track 10)
- Jorell Brand – producer (track 10)
- R. "Bolo Gah" Brown – producer (track 11)
- David "DJ Devastator" Walker – producer (track 14)
- Nolan Moffitte – engineering (tracks: 1–4, 6–12, 14–16)
- Steve Sola – engineering (track 5)
- Charlie Marotta – engineering (track 13)
- James Cruz – mastering
- Mitchell "Divine" Diggs – executive producer
- Sherin Baday – art direction, project coordinator
- Arlene Godfrey – project coordinator
- Jeff Trotter – A&R coordinator

== Charts ==
Chart (1998)	Peak position
Dutch Albums (Album Top 100)	36
German Albums (Offizielle Top 100)	29
UK Albums (Official Charts)	81
UK R&B Albums (Official Charts)	14
UK Independent Albums (Official Charts)	8
US Billboard 200	4
US Top R&B/Hip-Hop Albums (Billboard)	3

== Certifications ==
Region	Certification	Certified units/sales
United States (RIAA)	Gold	500,000^{^}
^{^} Shipments figures based on certification alone.
