= Bobby Digital Presents Northstar =

Northstar

Studio album by Northstar
- Released: January 20, 2004
- Genre: Hip hop
- Length: 44:57
- Label: Koch
- Producer: RZA (also exec.); Armand van Helden; DR Period; Jose "Choco" Reynoso; Mathematics; Mix Jive Musick

Northstar chronology
Northstar (2004)	West Coast Killa Beez (2005)

Professional ratings
Review scores
Source	Rating
AllHipHop	4/5 stars
AllMusic	3/5 stars
HipHopDX	2/5
laut.de	3/5 stars
RapReviews	5.5/10

Northstar is an eponymous debut studio album by Californian hip hop duo Northstar. It was released in 2004 through Koch Records. Production was handled by Armand van Helden, Allah Mathematics, DR Period, Jose "Choco" Reynoso, Mix Jive Musick, and RZA, who also served as presenter and executive producer. It features guest appearances from fellow Wu-Tang Clan affiliates, such as Kinetic 9, Freemurder, Calvin Cooler, Shacronz, Midnight, Tonebone, Shoshot, 9th Prince, Kryme Life, Trife Da God, Suga Bang Bang, Solomon Childs and Doc Doom.

== Track listing ==
No.	Title	Writer(s)	Producer(s)	Length
1.	"Luv Allah" (featuring Kinetic 9)	Andre Johnson; Reginald Grier; Samuel Craig Murray	Armand van Helden	4:10
2.	"We Got It" (featuring Freemurder)	Johnson; Grier; Timothy Drayton	Mathematics	2:50
3.	"Skit" (featuring Calvin Cooler)	Johnson; Grier; J. Klien		1:15
4.	"Red Rum" (featuring Shacronz and Poppa Don)	Johnson; Grier; Shaleek Drayton	RZA	4:08
5.	"Skit" (featuring Calvin Cooler)	Johnson; Grier		0:23
6.	"Crazy" (featuring Tonebone, Midnight and Shoshot)	Johnson; Grier; A. Harris; J. Saxton; K. Willis	Mix Jive Musick	4:26
7.	"Nuttin" (featuring 9th Prince)	Johnson; Grier	Armand van Helden	3:49
8.	"Skit" (featuring Calvin Cooler)	Johnson; Grier; Klien		1:00
9.	"See Me" (featuring Freemurder)	Johnson; Grier; T. Drayton	RZA	3:29
10.	"64"	Johnson; Grier	RZA	3:00
11.	"So So Serious" (featuring T.M.F.)	Johnson; Grier; Anthony Rayshaun Jones; Theodore Bailey	Jose "Choco" Reynoso	2:34
12.	"Duckie"	Johnson; Grier	Mathematics	2:51
13.	"Ballin'" (featuring Suga Bang Bang and Solomon Childs)	Johnson; Grier; Walbert Dale; Carl Wheeler; Charlie Ray Wiggins	DR Period	3:59
14.	"Destiny" (featuring Kinetic 9)	Johnson; Grier; Murray	RZA	4:16
15.	"Black Knights of the Northstar" (featuring Doc Doom! and Midnight)	Johnson; Grier; Dante Cunningham	Mix Jive Musick	2:47
Total length:				44:57

== Personnel ==
- Andre "Christ Bearer" Johnson – vocals
- Reginald "Meko the Pharaoh" Grier – vocals
- Samuel C. "Kinetic 9" Murray – vocals (tracks: 1, 14)
- Timothy "Freemurder" Drayton – vocals (tracks: 2, 9)
- Calvin Cooler – voice (tracks: 3, 5, 8)
- Shaleek "Shacronz" Drayton – vocals (track 4)
- Midnight – vocals (tracks: 6, 15)
- Tonebone – vocals (track 6)
- Shoshot – vocals (track 6)
- Terrance "9th Prince" Hamlin – vocals (track 7)
- Anthony "Kryme Life" Jones – vocals (track 11)
- Theodore "Trife" Bailey – vocals (track 11)
- Suga Bang Bang – vocals (track 13)
- Walbert "Solomon Childs" Dale – vocals (track 13)
- Deshawn "Doc Doom!" Cunningham – vocals (track 15)
- Armand van Helden – producer (tracks: 1, 7)
- Ronald "Allah Mathematics" Bean – producer (tracks: 2, 12)
- Robert "RZA" Diggs – producer (tracks: 4, 9, 10, 14), executive producer, presenter
- Mix Jive Musick – producer (tracks: 6, 15)
- Jose "Choco" Reynoso – producer (track 11)
- Darryl "DR Period" Pittman – producer (track 13)
- Jeff Gilligan – art direction, design
- Joe Giron – photography
- Cliff Cultreri – A&R
