= Sophia Chang =

Music director, producer, and manager (born 1965)

Sophia Chang (born 1965) is a Korean-American life coach, author, public speaker, screenwriter, and activist. Recognized as the first Asian woman in hip hop, Chang managed Wu-Tang Clan members such as RZA, GZA, and Ol' Dirty Bastard, as well as Q-Tip, A Tribe Called Quest, D'Angelo, and Raphael Saadiq. In 2020, she founded Unlock Her Potential, a program which provides free mentorship for women of color in the United States.

Her memoir is The Baddest Bitch in the Room (2019). Chang has been profiled by Interview Magazine, Okayplayer, and SiriusXM. In 2023, she was one of CNN's "Champions of Change."

== Early life and education ==
Sophia Chang was born in Vancouver, Canada to Korean parents in 1965. Her father Bomshik Chang was a mathematician and her mother Tongsook Chang, a librarian. She has one older brother, Heesok Chang. Chang received her Bachelor of Arts at the University of British Columbia in French literature.

== Career ==
=== Music ===
After graduating from the University of British Columbia, Sophia Chang moved to New York City to start her career in the music industry in the late 1980s. She worked with Paul Simon in the early days connecting through Joey Ramone. Chang then did A&R at Jive Records where she first met RZA. While at Jive, Chang signed Fu-Schnickens, members of Hieroglyphics, Souls of Mischief, and worked with A Tribe Called Quest, UGK, Too Short, and E-40. She later became the general manager of RZA's label Razor Sharp Records. At Razor Sharp, Chang worked with Ghostface Killah for his 1996 debut album, Ironman.

=== USA Shaolin Temple ===
From 1995 to 2007, Chang stepped away from the music industry to become the manager of the USA Shaolin Temple in New York City with her then-partner Shi Yan Ming. Chang oversaw day-to-day operations of the temple, finances, marketing, publicity, event production, and programming. The temple offered classes in Shaolin Kung Fu and Chan Buddhism.

=== The Baddest Bitch in the Room, 2019 ===
In September 2019, Chang published her memoir, The Baddest Bitch in the Room, which was released by Audible in partnership with Reese Witherspoon’s media brand, Hello Sunshine. The memoir detailed Chang's experiences in the music industry, pivoting to managing the Shaolin Temple in New York, and her personal life. She told Interview:

I spent my whole career, which is 30 years, helping extraordinarily talented men tell their stories. And there really is nobody better at it. I’m certain of that.... It took until I was 50 to understand that it was time to tell my story. What I learned at 50 was, “Oh shit, Sophia, your story is kind of interesting. Yeah, you should tell your story.” And I think that the bigger lesson in that for me is, we need to be uplifting the voices of the marginalized and building a tradition of storytelling that doesn’t just focus on whiteness. It is a profoundly important exercise, for the world, but also for me, to claim my own story as being one worthy of telling.

In 2020, The Baddest Bitch in the Room was listed as "Best Music Book of the Year" by both Kirkus Reviews and Rolling Stone. The hardcopy version of the book was released in 2020, and Chang sold the rights to her memoir to FX Networks that year. The book won the Wavy 2021 Best Book Award.

=== Mentorship program ===
In September 2020, Chang launched the Unlock Her Potential mentorship program for women of color. The program aims to provide mentorship and networking opportunities for women in the entertainment industry. Since its inception, Chang has recruited mentors such as Mona Scott-Young, Andre Royo, RZA, GZA, Jim Jarmusch, Bao Nguyen, 9th Wonder, Joey Bada$$, Ebro Darden, Michael Mann, W. Kamau Bell, Michael Ostin, and Pamela Adlon.

=== Other work ===
Chang produced several New York Fashion Week runway shows for designer Vivienne Tam. She also produced a runway show for Project Runway All Stars. Appearing as herself in several hip hop documentaries, Chang has also been attached as an executive producer to several TV projects.

== Other honors ==
In 2025, Assemblymember Grace Lee welcomed Sophia Chang to the chamber of the New York State Assembly.

== Personal life ==
Chang has two children with her ex-partner, Shi Yan Ming.
