= Christ Bearer =

Christ Bearer may refer to:

- Christopher (name), a name that translates as "Christ Bearer" in the meaning "Christ carrier"
- Christotokos, the Greek title of Mary, the mother of Jesus, literally translated as "Christ Bearer", in the meaning "the one who gave birth to Christ"
- Christ Bearer (rapper), the stage name of Andre Johnson, a member of the rap group Northstar
