= Silent Weapons for Quiet Wars =

Studio album by Killarmy
- Released: August 5, 1997
- Recorded: 1996–1997
- Studio: 36 Chambers Studio (New York, NY); 4th Chamber Studio (Stuebenville, OH)
- Genre: Hip hop
- Length: 1:04:38
- Label: Wu-Tang; Priority
- Producer: RZA (also exec.); 4th Disciple

Killarmy chronology
Silent Weapons for Quiet Wars (1997)	Dirty Weaponry (1998)

Singles from Silent Weapons for Quiet Wars
- 1. "Camouflage Ninjas / Wake Up" Released: October 1, 1996; 2. "Wu-Renegades / Clash Of The Titans" Released: February 1997

Professional ratings
Review scores
Source	Rating
AllMusic	3/5 stars
RapReviews	8/10

Silent Weapons for Quiet Wars is the debut studio album by American hip hop group Killarmy. It was released on August 5, 1997, through Wu-Tang/Priority Records.

== Background ==
Recording sessions took place at 36 Chambers Studio in Manhattan and 4th Chamber Studio in Steubenville. Production was mainly handled by member 4th Disciple, except for two tracks that were produced by the RZA, who also served as executive producer. It features guest appearances from Hell Razah, Masta Killa, Prodigal Sunn and Streetlife. The album features the singles "Camouflage Ninjas" b/w "Wake Up" and "Wu-Renegades" b/w "Clash of the Titans".

The group consists of six rappers: Killa Sin, Beretta 9, Islord, 9th Prince, P.R. Terrorist and ShoGun Assasson; and one producer, 4th Disciple, who produced the majority of the album. Like Black Lung's album of the same name, the title was taken from a document that came to light in the mid-1980s detailing an alleged New-World Order plan for world domination, a topic that was explored in Milton William Cooper's infamous book Behold a Pale Horse.

== Reception ==
Silent Weapons initially received mixed reviews from critics, who saw the group as a low-rent version of the Wu-Tang Clan because of similarities in the group's street-oriented Five-Percenter rhymes and dark production. The album was well received by Wu-Tang and underground hip hop fans—acclaimed for its unique combat themes and stellar production work. The album peaked at number 34 on the Billboard 200 and number 10 on the Top R&B/Hip-Hop Albums in the United States.

== Track listing ==
Silent Weapons For Quiet Wars
No.	Title	Writer(s)	Producer(s)	Length
1.	"Dress To Kill"	Jeryl Grant; Terrance Hamlin; Jamal Alexander; Selwyn Bogard	4th Disciple	3:36
2.	"Clash Of The Titans" (featuring Street Life)	Domingo J. Del Valle; Alexander; Hamlin; Samuel Craig Murray; Patrick Charles; Bogard	4th Disciple	3:38
3.	"Burning Season"	Hamlin; Grant; Bogard	4th Disciple	4:12
4.	"Blood For Blood"	Del Valle; Alexander; Hamlin; Murray; Bogard	4th Disciple	3:50
5.	"Seems It Never Fails"	Rodney Stevenson; Hamlin; Bogard	4th Disciple	2:27
6.	"Universal Soldier"	Grant; Del Valle; Alexander; Hamlin; Bogard	4th Disciple	4:13
7.	"Love, Hell or Right"	Bogard	4th Disciple	1:09
8.	"Wake Up" (featuring Hell Razah and Prodigal Sunn)	Hamlin; Stevenson; Grant; Chron Smith; Vergil Ruff; Robert Diggs	RZA	4:59
9.	"Fair, Love & War"	Grant; Murray; Del Valle; Alexander; Bogard	4th Disciple	4:06
10.	"Wu-Renegades"	Del Valle; Grant; Hamlin; Murray; Bogard	4th Disciple	3:49
11.	"Full Moon"	Hamlin; Grant; Bogard	4th Disciple	3:31
12.	"Under Siege"	Alexander; Del Valle; Murray; Bogard	4th Disciple	4:06
13.	"Shelter"	Murray; Alexander; Bogard	4th Disciple	3:41
14.	"Camouflage Ninjas"	Alexander; Del Valle; Murray; Hamlin; Bogard	4th Disciple	4:48
15.	"Swinging Swords"	Hamlin; Del Valle; Grant; Bogard	4th Disciple	3:53
16.	"War Face"	Hamlin; Alexander; Murray; Grant; Diggs	RZA; 4th Disciple (co.)	4:28
17.	"5 Stars" (featuring Masta Killa)	Hamlin; Murray; Alexander; Del Valle; Elgin Turner; Bogard	4th Disciple	4:12
Total length:				1:04:38

== Personnel ==
- Terrance "9th Prince" Hamlin – performer (tracks: 1–6, 8, 10, 11, 14–17)
- Jamal "ShoGun Assasson" Alexander – performer (tracks: 1, 2, 4, 6, 9, 12–14, 16, 17)
- Jeryl "Killa Sin" Grant – performer (tracks: 1, 3, 6, 8–11, 15, 16)
- Domingo "Dom Pachino" Del Valle – performer (tracks: 2, 4, 6, 9, 10, 12, 14, 15, 17)
- Samuel "Beretta 9" Murray – performer (tracks: 2, 4, 9, 10, 12–14, 16, 17)
- Rodney "Islord" Stevenson – performer (tracks: 5, 8)
- Patrick "StreetLife" Charles – performer (track 2)
- Chron "Hell Razah" Smith – performer (track 8)
- Vergil "Prodigal Sunn" Ruff – performer (track 8)
- Elgin "Masta Killa" Turner – performer (track 17)
- Selwyn "4th Disciple" Bougard – producer (tracks: 1–7, 9–15, 17), co-producer (track 16), engineering, mixing
- Robert "RZA" Diggs – producer (tracks: 8, 16), executive producer
- Joseph M. Palmaccio – mastering
- Ney "Flava" Pimentel – art direction, design, layout
- David Corio – photography
- Mitchell "Divine Justice" Diggs – coordinator, supervisor
- Sherin Baday – coordinator, supervisor

== Charts ==
Chart performance for Silent Weapons for Quiet Wars
Chart (1997)	Peak position
US Billboard 200	34
US Top R&B/Hip-Hop Albums (Billboard)	10
