= Fear, Love & War =

Studio album by Killarmy
- Released: September 11, 2001
- Recorded: 2000–2001
- Studio: 36 Chambers (New York, NY)
- Genre: Hip hop
- Length: 1:01:18
- Label: Loud
- Producer: Mitchell "Divine" Diggs (exec.); RZA (exec.); 4th Disciple; Falling Down; Mike "Trauma" D; Rebel Dainja

Killarmy chronology
Dirty Weaponry (1998)	Fear, Love & War (2001)	Full Metal Jackets (2020)

Singles from Fear, Love & War
- 1. "Feel It" Released: 2001

Professional ratings
Review scores
Source	Rating
AllMusic	3/5 stars
HipHopDX	3.5/5
RapReviews	7.5/10
Robert Christgau	(dud)
Vibe	3.5/5 stars

Fear, Love & War is the third studio album by the American hip hop group Killarmy. It was released on September 11, 2001, through Loud Records. Recording sessions took place at 36 Chambers Studio in New York City. Production was handled primary by member 4th Disciple, as well as Falling Down, Mike "Trauma" D and Rebel Dainja, with the RZA and Divine surviving as executive producers. It features guest appearances from Frukwan, Lord Superb, Polite, Prodigal Sunn, U-God and Madam Scheez. The album features the singles "Feel It" b/w "Militant" and "Street Monopoly" b/w "Monster".

While the album did not sell as well as the group's first two efforts, it received some critical acclaim, partly due to more mature and personal lyrical content, providing balance to the group's dark production, Five-Percenter militancy, and violent combat imagery. The album is now out of print.

== Track listing ==
Fear, Love & War
No.	Title	Writer(s)	Producer(s)	Length
1.	"Intro"			0:50
2.	"The Push" (featuring Lord Superb)	Jamel Cummings; Terrance Hamlin; Samuel Craig Murray; Rodney Stevenson; Selwyn Bogard	4th Disciple	3:53
3.	"Militant" (featuring U-God)	Domingo J. Del Valle; Murray; Hamlin; Jamal Alexander; Lamont Hawkins; Bogard	4th Disciple	3:20
4.	"Originators"	Hamlin; Marc McWilliams	Falling Down	3:09
5.	"Skit"			0:46
6.	"Sweatshop" (featuring Frukwan and Madam Scheez)	Murray; Stevenson; Arnold Hamilton; Bogard	4th Disciple	4:06
7.	"Street Monopoly"	Hamlin; Del Valle; Stevenson; Jeryl Grant; McWilliams	Falling Down	3:55
8.	"Afterhours Part 1"	Bogard	4th Disciple	1:01
9.	"Trilogy" (featuring Prodigal Sunn)	Murray; Vergil Russ; Bogard	4th Disciple	3:13
10.	"Feel It"	Stevenson; Del Valle; Hamlin; Bogard	4th Disciple	4:14
11.	"Skit"			1:17
12.	"Whatever We Want"	Grant; Del Valle; Murray; Hamlin; Stevenson; Bogard	4th Disciple	4:00
13.	"Skit"			0:34
14.	"Monster"	Hamlin; Del Valle; Murray; Grant; McWilliams	Falling Down	3:38
15.	"The Hit"	Stevenson; Alexander; Bogard	4th Disciple	3:53
16.	"One To Grow On"	Murray; Alexander; Bogard	4th Disciple	2:46
17.	"Skit"			0:36
18.	"Day One"	Del Valle; Hamlin; Nigel Julien; Rodolfo Falvo; Enzo Fusco	Rebel Dainja	4:17
19.	"Spoken Word"			1:21
20.	"Nonchalantly"	Hamlin; Murray; Stevenson; Del Valle; Michael Dewar	Mike "Trauma" D	4:35
21.	"The Rule" (featuring Polite)	Grant; Del Valle; Murray; Jason Bratcher; Bogard	4th Disciple	3:28
22.	"Lady Sings The Blues"	Stevenson; Del Valle; Hamlin; Dewar	Mike "Trauma" D	4:31
Total length:				1:01:18

Sample credits

- "Day One" contains a sample of "Dicitencello Vuje", written by Rodolfo Falvo and Enzo Fusco and performed by Mario Lanza.

== Personnel ==
- Terrance "9th Prince" Hamlin – performer (tracks: 2–4, 7, 10, 12, 14, 18, 20, 22)
- Samuel "Beretta 9" Murray – performer (tracks: 2, 3, 6, 9, 12, 14, 16, 20, 21)
- Domingo "Dom Pachino" Del Valle – performer (tracks: 3, 7, 10, 12, 14, 18, 20–22)
- Rodney "Islord" Stevenson – performer (tracks: 2, 6, 7, 10, 12, 15, 20, 22)
- Jeryl "Killa Sin" Grant – performer (tracks: 7, 12, 14, 21)
- Jamal "ShoGun Assasson" Alexander – performer (tracks: 3, 15, 16)
- Selwyn "4th Disciple" Bougard – performer (tracks: 15, 16), producer (tracks: 2, 3, 6, 8–10, 12, 15, 16, 21)
- Jamel "Superb" Cummings – performer (track 2)
- Lamont "U-God" Hawkins – performer (track 3)
- Arnold "Frukwan" Hamilton – performer (track 6)
- Samantha "Madam Scheez" Brown – performer (track 6)
- Vergil "Prodigal Sunn" Ruff – performer (track 9)
- Jason "Polite" Bratcher – performer (track 21)
- Marc "Falling Down" McWilliams – producer (tracks: 4, 7, 14)
- Nigel "Rebel Dainja" Julien – producer (track 18)
- Mike "Trauma" Dewar – producer (tracks: 20, 22)
- Jose "Choco" Reynoso – mixing
- Joe Yannece – mastering
- Mitchell "Divine Justice" Diggs – executive producer
- Robert "RZA" Diggs – executive producer
- Jamie Story – art direction, design, layout
- Bilal Allah – A&R
- Saadiq Busby – A&R

== Charts ==
Chart performance for Fear, Love & War
Chart (2001)	Peak position
US Billboard 200	122
US Top R&B/Hip-Hop Albums (Billboard)	34
