= AKA the Rugged Child =

Studio album by Shyheim
- Released: April 19, 1994
- Recorded: 1993
- Studio: Battery Studios (New York City); Chung King Studios (Manhattan, NY); Firehouse Studios (Brooklyn, NY)
- Genre: Hip hop
- Length: 48:06
- Label: Virgin/EMI Records; 7243 8 39385 2 0 V2-39385
- Producer: Gemma Corfield (exec.); Thomas Wilson (exec.); RNS (also exec.); RZA

Shyheim chronology
AKA the Rugged Child (1994)	The Lost Generation (1996)

Singles from AKA the Rugged Child
- 1. "On and On" Released: November 30, 1993; 2. "Pass It Off" Released: 1994; 3. "One's 4 Da Money" Released: August 23, 1994

Professional ratings
Review scores
Source	Rating
AllMusic	3/5 stars
Entertainment Weekly	B

AKA the Rugged Child is the debut studio album by American rapper Shyheim. It was released on April 19, 1994, on Virgin/EMI Records. Production was entirely handled by RNS, except for one song produced by RZA. It features guest appearances from GP Wu, Du-Lilz, Kwazi, Prophet, and Kia Jeffries. The album peaked at #52 on the Billboard 200 and at #7 on Top R&B/Hip-Hop Albums in the United States. Its lead single, "On and On", peaked at #89 on the Billboard Hot 100 singles chart.

== Track listing ==
No.	Title	Producer(s)	Length
1.	"Here Come the Hits"	RNS	3:40
2.	"On and On" (featuring June Luva, Kia Jeffries & RNS)	RNS	3:48
3.	"Pass It Off" (featuring Down Low Recka, Pop Da Brown Hornet & Rubbabandz)	RNS	4:00
4.	"Never Say Never" (Interlude)	RNS	0:28
5.	"One's 4 Da Money"	RNS	3:33
6.	"Here I Am"	RNS	2:53
7.	"Move It Over Here"	RNS	4:11
8.	"Buckwylyn"	RNS	3:57
9.	"You the Man" (featuring Down Low Recka)	RNS	3:35
10.	"Napsack"	RNS	3:51
11.	"The Rugged Onez" (featuring June Luva, Kwazi & Prophet)	RNS	4:52
12.	"Little Rascals"	Prince Rakeem	2:07
13.	"4 the Headpiece (Interlude)" (featuring Down Low Recka, Du-Lilz & Rubbabandz)	RNS	2:02
14.	"Party's Goin' On"	RNS	3:43
15.	"Shouts on the Outs" (Interlude)	RNS	1:26
Total length:			48:06

=== Samples ===
- "Here Come the Hits"
  - "Can I Get Some Help" by James Brown
  - "Harmony of the Underground" by Blue Mitchell
- "On and On"
  - "Opus Pocus" by Jaco Pastorius
- "Pass It Off"
  - "Don't Change Your Love" by Five Stairsteps
  - "You've Got It Bad" by Richard "Groove" Holmes
- "One's 4 Da Money"
  - "Cristo Rendentor" by Donald Byrd
  - "Top Billin'" by Audio Two
  - "Blue Suede Shoes" by Carl Perkins
- "Here I Am"
  - "Pain" by the Ohio Players
- "Buckwylyn"
  - "Donkey Walk" by Lou Donaldson
  - "Just to Get a Rep" by Gang Starr
- "You the Man"
  - "No Matter What Shape (Your Stomach's In)" by Booker T. & the M.G.'s
- "Napsack"
  - "Wishin' and Hopin'" by Dusty Springfield
  - "Kool is Back" by Funk Inc.
  - "Crab Apple" by Idris Muhammad
  - "Microphone Fiend" by Eric B. & Rakim
- "The Rugged Onez"
  - "In The Mood" by Leroy Hutson
  - "For Pete's Sake" by Pete Rock & CL Smooth
- "Party's Goin' On"
  - "After Laughter (Come Tears)" by Wendy Rene

== Charts ==
Chart (1994)	Peak position
US Billboard 200	52
US Top R&B/Hip-Hop Albums (Billboard)	7
