= GP Wu =

American hip hop group

- Also known as: G.P. the Grain, Gladiator Posse
- Origin: Staten Island, New York, USA
- Genres: Hip-Hop
- Years active: 1996–1998
- Label: MCA
- Members: Pop Da Brown Hornet; Down Low Recka; Rubbabandz; June Luva

GP Wu (short for Gladiator Posse) was an American hip hop group consisting of four members, Pop Da Brown Hornet, Down Low Recka, Rubbabandz and June Luva. The group formed in 1996 and were one of the many affiliates of the Wu-Tang Clan.

All four members appeared on fellow Wu-Tang affiliate Shyheim's first two albums, 1994's AKA the Rugged Child and 1996's The Lost Generation, with their first official appearance as a group being on the track entitled "5 Elements" from the latter. The group released their first and only album Don't Go Against the Grain in 1997 through MCA Records. The album was met with little success and only reached No. 44 on the Billboard Top R&B/Hip-Hop Albums. Following the album, the group went their separate ways, with Pop Da Brown Hornet being the only one to release a solo album, 2000's The Undaground Emperor.

== Discography ==
Year	Title	Chart positions	
Year	Title	U.S. R&B	U.S. Heat
1997	Don't Go Against the Grain: Released: January 21, 1997; Label: MCA	44	15
