= Shi Yan Ming =

34th generation Shaolin warrior monk

Shì Yánmíng 釋延明
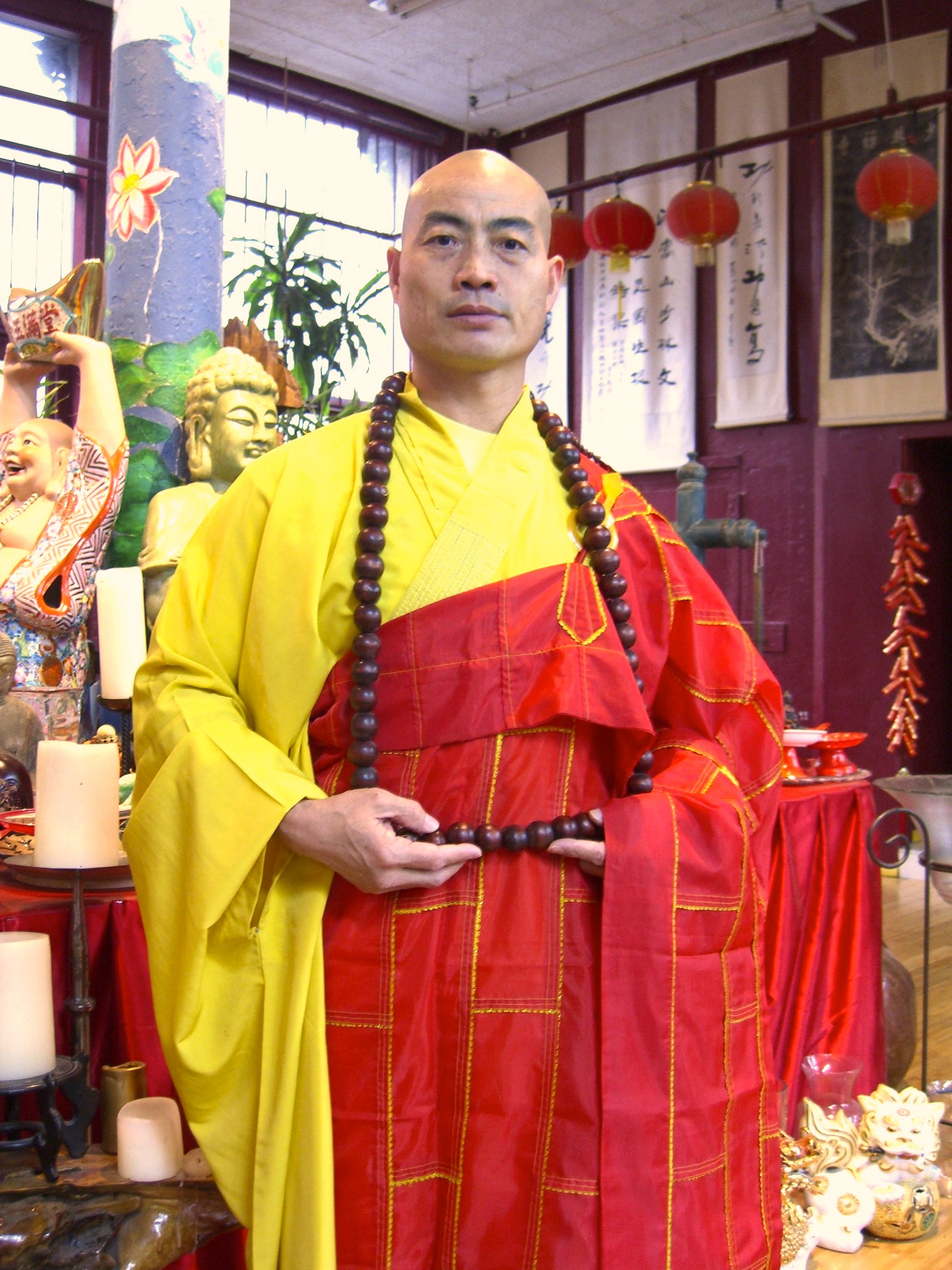
- Shi Yan Ming at USA Shaolin Temple in Lower Manhattan, November 4, 2010
- Title: Chan Master, Founder and abbot of the USA Shaolin Temple

Personal life
- Born: Duan Genshan; February 13, 1964 (age 62) Zhumadian, Henan, China
- Website: usashaolintemple.org

Religious life
- Religion: Buddhism
- Denomination: Chan Buddhism
- School: Shaolin Temple
- Lineage: 34th Generation Shaolin Warrior Monk
- Dharma name: Shì Yánmíng 釋延明

Senior posting
- Teacher: Shi Yong Qian (釋永乾)
- Students: RZA, Wesley Snipes, Rosie Perez, Bokeem Woodbine, John Leguizamo, Taimak

Shi Yan Ming (born Duan Gen Shan; February 13, 1964) is a 34th generation Shaolin warrior monk, teacher and actor, best known as the founder of the USA Shaolin Temple. Trained at the Shaolin Temple in Henan, People's Republic of China (PRC) since the age of five, Shi Yan Ming came to the United States in 1992, before opening the USA Shaolin Temple in Manhattan, where he has taught hundreds of students, including numerous celebrities. He has made various media appearances in television, film and print, including National Geographic, PBS, History, Time magazine, and the 1999 American samurai action film, Ghost Dog: The Way of the Samurai.

== Early life ==
Shi Yan Ming was born Duan Gen Shan in Zhumadian, Henan Province, China, on Chinese New Year's, February 13, 1964, the Year of the Dragon, the seventh of nine children. His father grew up in a family so poor that they were essentially homeless, and begged for food door-to-door. Duan's father, who never went to school, slept under a wood-burning stove, or would dig a hole in a stack of wheat for warmth. Despite these hardships, he taught himself to be a very literate reader, writer and calligrapher. Duan's mother's family was slightly better off financially. As was typical, she was not educated either, had her feet bound, and was raised solely to be a mother and housewife. Duan's parents eventually acquired jobs for the Chinese government under Mao, and worked underground as telex operators.

Prior to his birth, two of Duan's older brothers and one older sister died of starvation in Mao Zedong's Great Leap Forward in the late 1950s. Duan himself almost died when he was approximately two or three years old, prompting his parents to spend all their money on numerous doctors, and his father to sell his special calligraphy pen. Doctors eventually gave up on him, and after thinking their seventh child had died, his parents wrapped him in blankets, intending to throw him away, before being stopped by an acupuncturist outside their village who saw them crying, and performed acupuncture on the infant Gen Shan, who promptly recovered. Yan Ming believes the man was a bodhisattva sent by Buddha to save his life.

== Martial arts career ==
=== In China ===
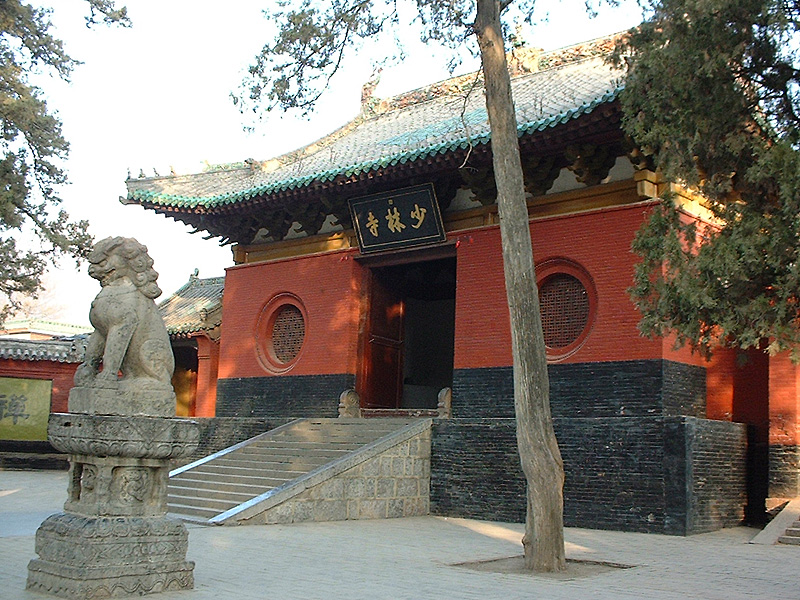
The Shaolin Temple in Henan Province, China

In 1969, the five-year-old Duan's Buddhist parents, still worried about his health, took him to the 1,500-year-old Shaolin Temple, the only remains of which after repeated destruction by warring dynasties and the current government were the foundation and some walls. (The temple as it is known today was reconstructed around the turn of the 21st century.) As this was in the middle of the Cultural Revolution, the familiar red and yellow robes and shaved heads were also not present among the monks, and would not be until approximately 1980, after the Cultural Revolution ended. Since there had not been an abbot at the temple in about 300 years, Duan was taken to the head monk, Shi Xing Zheng (who would later be appointed abbot in 1986). Shi Xing Zheng, whom Duan addressed as "Shigong" ("Grandmaster") or "Shifu Shifu" ("master's master"), looked at the young Duan and accepted him into the temple, where his parents were happy to leave him. As soon as he was accepted in the temple, which was populated by about 16 or 17 monks, all of them older than Duan (most of them in their seventies), his name was changed to Shi Yan Ming. The name is derived from "Shi", as in Shakyamuni, the founder of Buddhism, a family name that Buddhist monks of this tradition take in order to denote that they follow Buddha, "Yan", which denotes the "34th generation" at the Shaolin Temple, and "Ming", which means "perpetual", as in the infinite cycle of the Dharma wheel. Shi says that his "kung fu uncles" at the temple were very loving, and took care of him as his own parents would, though they did not live there all the time, for fear of Mao's Red Guard, and therefore, Shi saw his parents often.

Shi immediately started learning kung fu, Chan Buddhism and acupuncture from his masters, Liu Xin Yi and Shen Ping An, who were Shaolin disciples living outside the temple, rather than monks. Because of the open nature of the temple, where people could come and go easily, he says he learned to read people. Despite his training, Shi also amused himself by playing pranks on his masters, who would punish him either with beatings, or by making him do the horse stance until his legs were numb and swollen, or making do headstands until the blood draining into his head caused pain. Shi's daily routine consisted of awakening at 4:30 am to practice for two hours, followed by a breakfast of steamed tofu and vegetables, prayer, meditation or relaxation for an hour, and then another three and a half hours of practice. This would be followed by more prayer, Buddhism studies, and cleaning or other temple work. Although Shaolin monks do not necessarily follow the practice of other monks who do not eat past noon, those at the temple would eat a lunch of noodles, rice or mantou at 11:30 am, out of respect to monks visiting from other temples. After an hour of relaxation, Shi would practice and pray again from 1:00 pm to 5:30 pm, followed by dinner, more relaxation, and more practice until 10:00 pm. From then until 4:00 am the monks would work in shifts to check the temple's incense. The monks slept on a piece of wood with a blanket on it, sometimes using their clothes for pillows, which Shi says is good for the back, compared to American beds, which he says are too comfortable. Although Shi met his Buddhism Shifu, Shi Yong Qian, almost immediately after entering the temple, he did not begin seriously studying with him until he was about 14 or 15. Because the temple did not have running water, the monks had to transport it from mountain rivers just outside the temple, draw it from a well, and collect rainwater. When the temple acquired running water in 1986, the monks were dissatisfied, because under the system of feng shui, digging up the ground and laying in pipes was, as Shi puts it, akin to "cutting your veins out". During the cold winter months, bathing was restricted to washing selected body parts, rather than immersion in or under water. Even today the temple only has cold water.

In 1980, a young Jet Li arrived at the temple to shoot his feature film debut, Shaolin Temple. Though Shi barely noticed him at the time, the film's 1982 release was a major turning point for the temple, which experienced a significant increase in tourism. This in turn resulted in more positive attention to the temple by the Chinese government, which rebuilt the building, and in a change to the monks' daily routine, so that they could accommodate the tourists. Around this time, when Shi was 16, his parents, who held stressful jobs and were heavy smokers, died of lung cancer within six months of each other. Shi would then take care of his younger brother, while his older brothers would take care of the younger siblings, with whom Shi is still in contact today.

In 1985, Shi won the 65 kg (147 lb.) championship in the Xian National Sparring Competition. He also won the championship in the annual Shaolin Disciples Competition three years in a row (1988–1990), and was vice-coach of the Shaolin Temple Fighting Monks at Henan.

In 1992, Shi, who had won many national martial arts competitions, was chosen to be among a group of select Shaolin monks invited by the American Kung Fu Association to tour the United States, the first such tour for the ShaolinTemple, to spread the knowledge of Shaolin Kung Fu.

=== In the United States ===
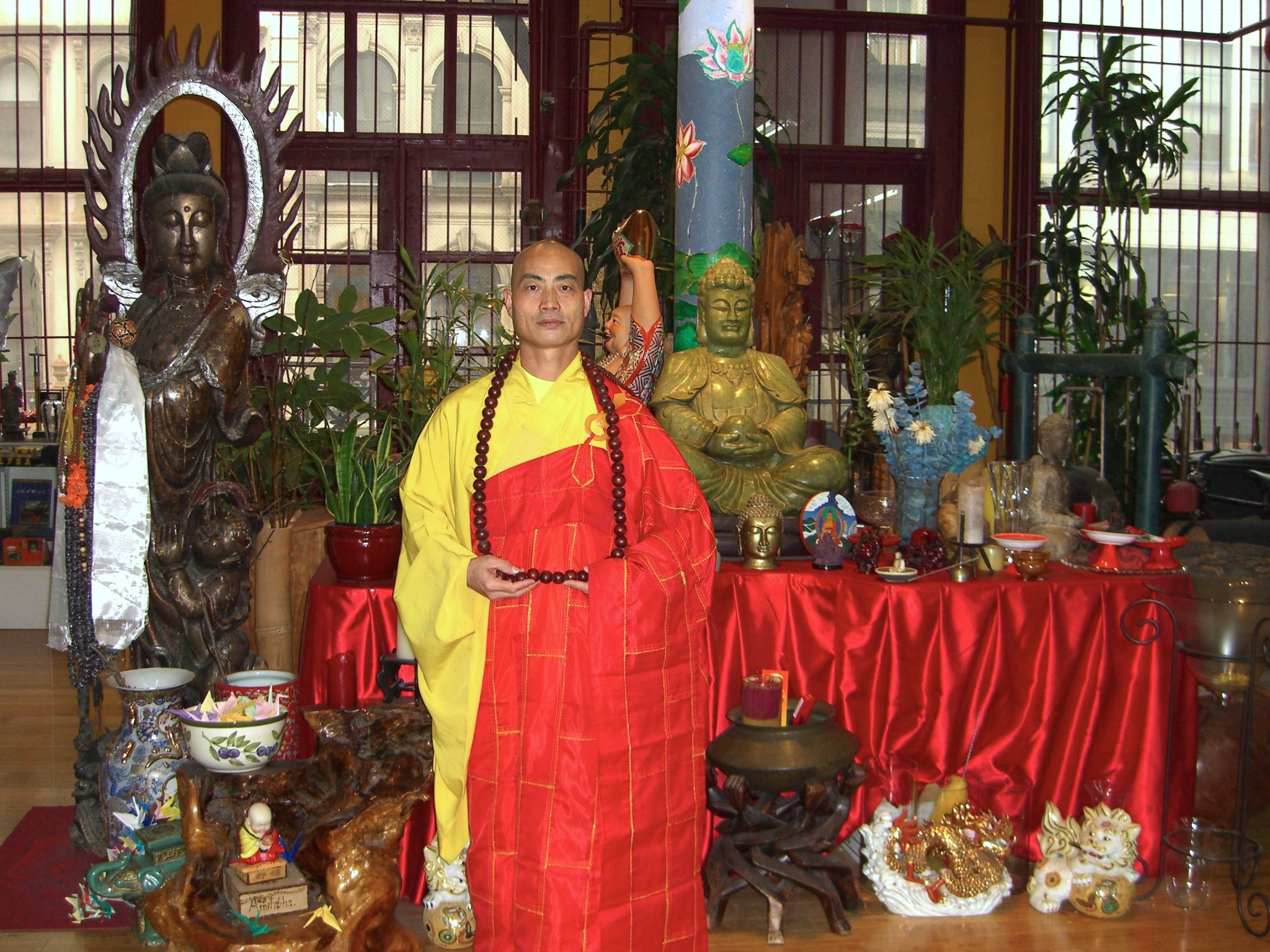
Shi Yan Ming in front of the Buddhist shrine at USA Shaolin Temple, housed in a second story Lower Manhattan loft

After the tour's last show concluded in San Francisco, Shi secretly left his hotel in the middle of the night and escaped in order to defect from China to the United States. Speaking no English, Shi directed a cab driver with hand signals to an unknown destination, but the frustrated driver dropped him off in the middle of nowhere and called the police. Shi showed the police his passport and some newspaper clippings featuring him, so the police requested the driver take him to a Chinese restaurant in order to find someone who could communicate with him. However, since the staff at the restaurant spoke only Cantonese and not Shi's Mandarin, the monk wrote down his communications, since both dialects employ the same characters. The restaurant staff helped Shi call a friend in New York City, who had someone pick up Shi, who hid in a basement for a week, eating only bread and cereal, while the news media were reporting his escape. After a week, he traveled to New York.

Shi's defection was motivated in part because he disagreed with the monastery's strictures, saying, "In the temple, monks have 250 rules. Two hundred fifty! Just think of that! You cannot drink. You cannot eat spices. You cannot drink bottled water. You cannot look at a woman. That's just crazy. It's the 21st century, you know?"

Choosing New York to be his new base of operations in order to spread the message of Buddhism and Shaolin kung fu because he saw it as the "capital of the world", Shi opened the first USA Shaolin Temple at 96 Bowery Street in Chinatown in December 1994. Because there was no heat, electricity or hot water, Shi would tape flashlights to the walls for light, teaching up to 18 hours a day in order to attract students. At night he would wear several pairs of socks on his feet to stay warm, and accumulated hundreds of pairs of unwashed socks due to his initial inability to wash clothes without water. He would also perform in Chinese restaurants to raise money for children and the elderly, gave free lessons, and spoke of philosophy in Open Centre on Spring Street. In 1996, he moved the USA Shaolin Temple to a third floor loft at 678 Broadway in the East Village. In late 2006, after its lease expired, the temple was relocated to its current location in a second floor, high-ceilinged loft at 446 Broadway, in Chinatown, where he teaches Shaolin martial arts and Chan Buddhism in two-hour classes from 5am to 9pm, every day, to nearly 500 students, who have included notables such as Wesley Snipes, Rosie Perez, Bokeem Woodbine, RZA, Jim Jarmusch, Björk and Tricky.

In June 1995, Shi traveled to Toronto, Ontario, Canada to perform with a delegation of his brother Shaolin monks, headed by Great Master Shi Yongxin, who were sent on tour to Canada. In 1999 he returned to China with his students to help build relations between China and the United States. In late 2001, he returned to the Henan Province with 40 of his students for a martial arts festival.

The USA Shaolin Temple has six international satellite branches in Austria, South Africa, Trinidad, Chile, Argentina, and Mexico. In 2010, Shi and the USA Shaolin Temple purchased over 80 acres (320,000 m^{2}) of land in Middletown, Delaware County, New York, where he intends to build a new Shaolin Temple.

== Abilities ==
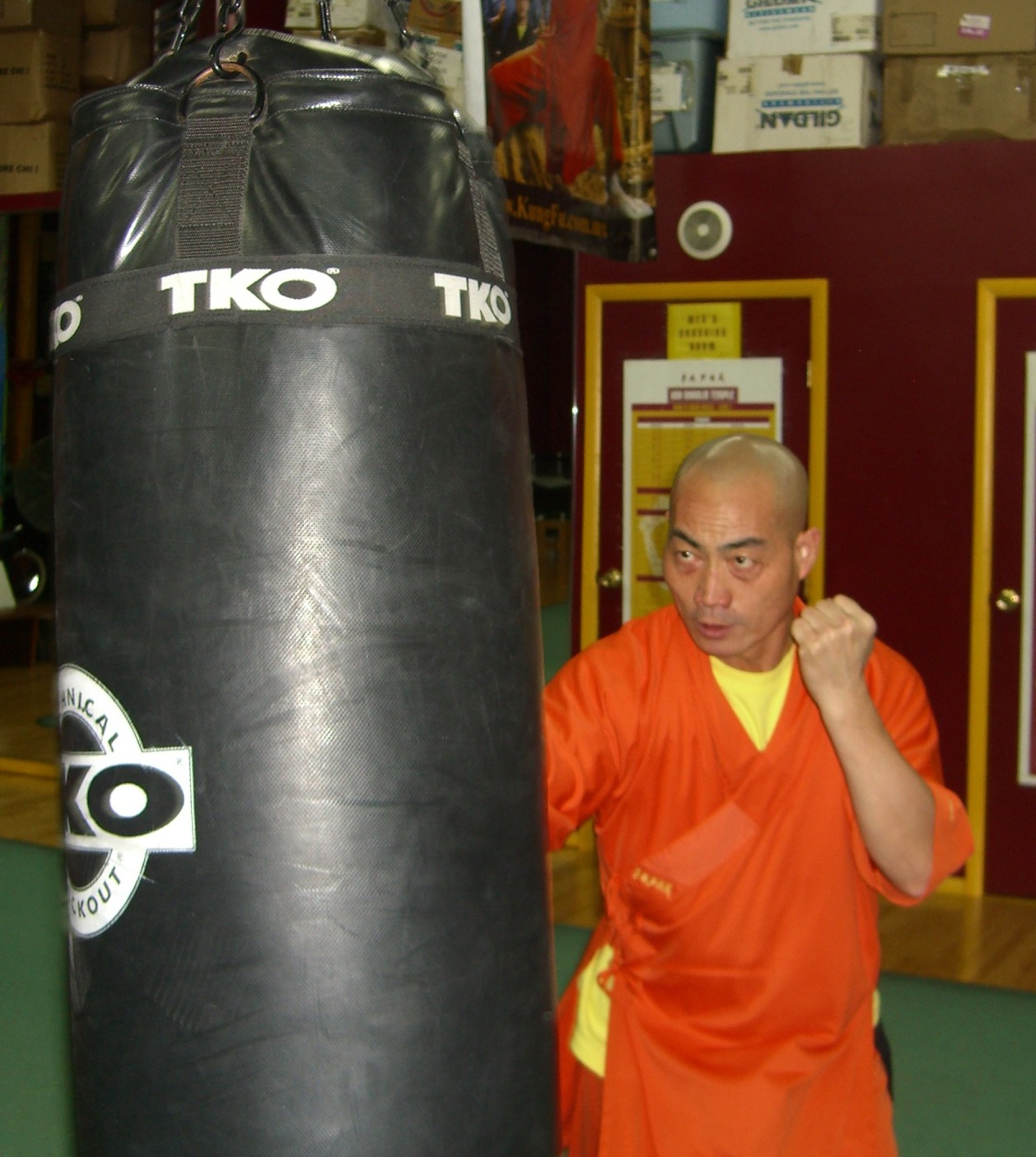
Shi's punches can exert up to 772 lbf (3,430 N) of force.

According to The New York Times, as a young monk, Shi Yan Ming learned to break rocks with his skull, deflect blades with his skin, and sleep while hanging upside down from a tree branch. By the age of 17, according to Time magazine and The New Yorker, he could deflect the tip of a spear with his neck, sleep standing on one leg, and dangle a 50-pound (23 kg) weight from his scrotum, a practice that helped train him to withstand a full-force blow to the groin. According to accounts in Time and The New Yorker, Shi could also lick red-hot iron shovels and fly aboveground upside down in full splits, though video record of these feats are not in circulation. In a 2005 Discovery Channel profile, Shi stated that since being taken by his parents to the Shaolin Temple, he had never experienced any health problems as he did as an infant, and has never been sick.

Shi's punching strength has been measured at 772 lbf (3,430 N) of force. Among his martial arts specialties are Luohan Quan, Magic Staff and other Shaolin weapons, and hard qi gong.

== Media appearances ==
Shi Yan Ming had a small role in the 1999 movie Ghost Dog: The Way of the Samurai, which was directed by one of his students, Jim Jarmusch. He has been profiled on PBS, and on the History series Stan Lee's Superhumans. In 2005, National Geographic filmed a documentary on him titled "Kung Fu Monk". He has also worked as a model, and the tourist bureau of his native village, Henan Province, put him on a billboard advertising their most famous native son. He is also depicted performing various styles of kung fu in four giant posters that show him that hang over the entrance to the modern Anhui Guoyang Chudian Branch of the Shaolin Wushu Center, near the Shaolin Temple.

Says Jarmusch, "I love his contradictions. He's so playful and yet he has the potential for incredible physical ferocity." The RZA, producer of and Shi's co-star in the urban kung fu film Z Chronicles, says of Shi, "When I looked at the dailies, he just exploded on the camera. I'd say, 'Damn Shifu, you're a real live movie star.'"

Shi was among the monks profiled in the 1995 book The Real Shaolin Gongfu of China. In 2006 Rodale Books published Shi's own book, The Shaolin Workout: 28 Days to Transforming Your Body and Soul the Warrior's Way.

Throughout his career, Shi has been featured in advertisements for Hewlett-Packard, Burberry, Adidas, Chase Bank, Sprite, & multiple magazine covers including twice on Black Belt Magazine.

He has also been featured in numerous publications & interviews across the world including The New York Times, The Atlantic, The New Yorker, VICE Sports, VICE China, Grazia Homme (France), Vogue, Great Big Story, NPR, WRUR on Journeys Through The Arts with Josef Verba & more.

On May 21, 2020, Shi appeared on ABC's To Tell The Truth.

On August 13, 2020, Shi appeared on Discovery Channel's reality series with Caroline Wozniacki & David Lee as 1 of 3 super humans to train the family to summit Mt. Kilmanjaro.

== Personal life ==
Shi lives in New York City. Shi never took the Shaolin celibacy vows, as he entered the Shaolin Temple at the age of five. Explaining his eschewing of celibacy, Shi remarks, "I'm too handsome for that."
