= Wu-Syndicate =

Hip-hop group from Virginia, US

- Origin: Virginia, U.S.
- Genre: Hip-hop
- Years active: 1998–present
- Labels: Wu-Tang
- Members: Joe Mafia; Myalansky; Napoleon

Wu-Syndicate is a group from Virginia consisting of Joe Mafia, Napoleon, and Myalansky (who named himself after the gangster Meyer Lansky). They were originally called Crime Syndicate but changed their name to Wu-Syndicate when they signed to Wu-Tang Records and became Wu-Tang Clan affiliates.

After debuting on the compilation Wu-Tang Killa Bees: The Swarm in 1998, their self-titled debut album Wu-Syndicate was released in 1999 on both Wu-Tang Records and their own label Slot Time Records. The album was, like most releases from Wu-Tang Clan affiliates during this time enjoyed moderately successful sales with the single "Where Wuz Heaven" going gold.

Soon after the release there was a dispute of an unknown origin between the group and Wu-Tang Records and the group briefly changed their name to The Syndicate until 2009 with eventual reconciliation and the release of their second official album Grimlenz, produced mostly by Antagonist Dragonspit of Virginia Beach, VA. Both Myalansky and Napoleon continue to work with Joe Mafia but have refused to work with each other since the release of their first album. In an interview Napoleon stated that though they have always clashed, "Mya is still my dude though regardless". The group has maintained ties with various members of the Wu-Tang Family.

Napoleon is currently working on a project with fellow Wu-Tang alumni Solomon Childs, Shaka Amazulu, and Dexter Wiggle called "Illuminati Network". Joe Mafia released his debut solo album This One in 2002 and founded his own label called 58 West Diamond Street Records. Napoleon released his first solo album, Kingpin Wit Da Inkpen in 2007 and a mixtape titled Mark of the Beast in 2011. Myalansky released his first solo album, Drastic Measures in 2008 and a mixtape a few years later in 2011 AMW.Com. Myalansky has also been working with California rapper Mitchy Slick and has released two more volumes of his AMW.Com mixtape series. In 2013 Myalansky and Joe Mafia featured on the song "Golden Age Rapper" by CHG Unfadable.

== Discography ==
- Wu-Syndicate (1999)
- The Syndicate is Back (2007) (mixtape)
- Grimlenz (2009) (Limited Edition 2010)
- Illustrious (2019)
- Underworld King (2020)

== Solo albums ==
Joe Mafia

- This One (2002)

Napoleon

- Kingpin Wit Da Inkpen (2007)
- Mark of the Beast (2011)(mixtape)
- Ring of Power (2015)

Myalansky

- Strait Razor (2000) (Unreleased)
- Drastic Measures (2008)
- AMW.com, Vol. 1 (2011)(mixtape)
- AMW.com, Vol. 2 (2011) (mixtape)
- AMW.com, Vol. 3 (2012) (mixtape)
- Drastic Measures 2 (2018)
- Drastic Measures 3 (2021)

== See also ==
- List of Wu-Tang Clan affiliates
