= The Lost Generation (album) =

Studio album by Shyheim
- Released: May 28, 1996
- Recorded: 1994–96
- Genre: East Coast hip hop
- Length: 57:06
- Label: Noo Trybe Records
- Producers: Gemma Corfield (exec.); Guy Routte (exec.); RNS (also exec.); DR Period; Peter Lord; The King Of Chill; V. Jeffrey Smith; L.E.S.; RZA; Tone Capone

Shyheim chronology
AKA the Rugged Child (1994)	The Lost Generation (1996)	Manchild (1999)

Singles from The Lost Generation
- 1. "This Iz Real" Released: 1996; 2. "Shaolin Style" Released: 1996

Professional ratings
Review scores
Source	Rating
AllMusic	2/5 stars

The Lost Generation is the second studio album by American rapper Shyheim. It was released on May 28, 1996, via Noo Trybe Records. Production was handled by RNS, DR Period, Peter Lord, The King of Chill, V. Jeffrey Smith, L.E.S., RZA and Tone Capone. It features guest appearances from GP Wu, 9th Prince, DV Alias Khrist, Killa Sin, Smoothe da Hustler, Trigga tha Gambler, Squig, 702 members Kameelah Williams and Lamisha Grinstead. The album peaked at #63 on the Billboard 200 and at #10 on Top R&B/Hip-Hop Albums in the United States. Its lead single, "This Iz Real", peaked at #84 on the Hot R&B/Hip-Hop Songs and #26 on the Hot Rap Songs.

== Track listing ==
No.	Title	Producer(s)	Length
1.	"Shit Iz Real"	RNS	4:04
2.	"Dear God" (featuring Pop Da Brown Hornet)	RNS	4:24
3.	"Jiggy Comin'"	RNS	3:46
4.	"5 Elements" (featuring Down Low Recka, June Luva, Pop Da Brown Hornet and Rubbabandz)	RNS	4:22
5.	"Shaolin Style" (featuring Squig)	L.E.S.	3:46
6.	"Real Bad Boys"	RNS	4:04
7.	"What Makes the World Go Round" (featuring D.V. Alias Khrist, Rubbabandz, Smoothe Da Hustler and Trigger Tha Gambler)	DR Period	5:18
8.	"Can You Feel It"	RNS	3:07
9.	"Life of a Shortie"	Tone Capone	3:46
10.	"Don't Front / Let's Chill" (featuring Kameelah Williams and Lamisha Grinstead)	Peter Lord; The King Of Chill; V. Jeffrey Smith	4:00
11.	"Things Happen"	RNS	4:01
12.	"See What I See"	DR Period	3:06
13.	"Still There"	Peter Lord; The King Of Chill; V. Jeffrey Smith	4:14
14.	"Young Godz" (featuring Killa Sin, Madman, Rubbabandz and Raekwon)	RZA	5:08
Total length:			57:06

== Charts ==
Chart (1996)	Peak position
US Billboard 200	63
US Top R&B/Hip-Hop Albums (Billboard)	10
