= Northstar (rap group) =

American hip hop duo

- Origin: United States
- Genres: Hip hop
- Labels: Wu-Tang
- Past members: Christ Bearer; Meko The Pharaoh (deceased) Dthedragon

Northstar is an American hip hop duo, composed of rappers Christ Bearer and Meko The Pharaoh and Dthedragon,who was later made a member by Christ Bearer.They were signed to Wu-Tang Records by RZA.

The group used to record with fellow Californian group Black Knights as Black Knights Of The North Star, and indeed the two groups were initially signed by RZA as such to Wu-Tang Records. The groups have since split into two separate units, and Northstar released their debut album in 2003, titled Bobby Digital Presents Northstar, which also featured a reunion with Black Knights on the closing song "Black Knights Of The North Star". In 1999, the duo appeared on the soundtrack to the film Ghost Dog: The Way of the Samurai. Their second album West Coast Killa Beez was released in 2005. A third album followed in 2008. They began introducing their own sub groups in 2011.

On April 16, 2014, member Christ Bearer severed his penis and jumped from a Los Angeles apartment building in an attempted suicide. During the incident he was under the influence of PCP and was distraught about restraining orders that would keep him from seeing his children. He was rushed to Cedars-Sinai Medical Center where he was in critical condition while doctors unsuccessfully attempted to reattach his penis.

In 2016, Christ Bearer was interviewed for an episode of the Vice TV show Hamilton's Pharmacopeia about PCP. In the interview, he described his state of mind on the night he severed his penis:

PCP is something that can alter reality... It's like knowledge. You can see something, and once you see that you can't ever go back. You can be exposed to too much truth and it can make you nutty... So that night I had some PCP. I was watching cartoons. And, to me, for some reason, life turned into a cartoon. And I had three baby mothers, and they all had restraining orders on me so I couldn't see my kids. But I figured, man, I keep on having these babies by these girls. I was thinking they're just kinda groupies. And then once they have these babies by me I'm trapped. And they'd say 'hey, I'm going to need some amount of money from you to put me in that life.' It started being like society that was just dragging me down into a vortex that I could not stop. Women say 'men think with their little head too much. They're always thinking with their little heads.' So I said 'you know what? I got something for these bitches. I'm going to cut off my little head, and I'll be forced to only think with my big head.' And that was clear as day to me, and I acted upon it.

In 2017, members Meko and Christ Bearer were featured in the BBC mini documentary "The Rapper Who Chopped His Penis Off". The program catalogues the events leading up to Christ Bearer's attempted suicide.

On July 26, 2022 Meko The Pharaoh died.
