= Killarmy =

American hip hop group

- Origin: Steubenville, Ohio; Staten Island, New York
- Genre: Hip hop
- Years active: 1995–present
- Labels: Wu-Tang/Priority/EMI; Loud/Relativity
- Members: 9th Prince; Killa Sin; Dom Pachino; Islord; Kinetic 9 Shogun Assason; 4th Disciple

Killarmy (/ˌkɪləˈɑːrmi/) is an American hip hop group that is affiliated with Wu-Tang Clan. It is one of the earliest and most successful of the many Wu-Tang affiliates along with Sunz of Man.

Killarmy's music consists of lyrics and songs focused on the themes of military combat, war, terrorism, conspiracy theories, and the teachings of the Five-Percent Nation. The group's instrumentals are usually somber with ominous dark undertones and a raw, gritty production style provided by 4th Disciple.

== Career ==
Originally consisting of New York rappers 9th Prince (RZA's younger brother), Islord, Dom Pachino, Killa Sin, and Ohio-based producer 4th Disciple; it added Beretta 9 (a.k.a. Kinetic 9) and Shogun Assason to its membership in 1996, also from Ohio.

Killarmy released numerous singles from 1995 to 1997, including "Swinging Swords" and "Camouflage Ninjas" and appeared on the Sunz Of Man collaborations "Wake Up" and "Soldiers of Darkness". The group's debut album, Silent Weapons for Quiet Wars, was released in 1997, just after the release of Wu-Tang Clan's second album and a 12-inch single containing two tracks from the album, which were "Wu-Renegades" and "Clash of the Titans."

In 1997, the group's manager General Wise was shot dead in Steubenville, Ohio, (where several members and Wu-Tang Clan members such as the RZA had spent time in their youth), but the group pressed on undeterred, appearing on the Wu-Tang Killa Bees: The Swarm compilation and each making numerous appearances on other Wu-Tang Clan projects, Wu-Tang affiliates' projects, non-Wu-Tang Clan-related albums such as ONYX – Shut 'Em Down; Vordul Mega – Verbal Relaxation; and movie soundtracks such as Soul in the Hole.

The group's second album, Dirty Weaponry, was released in 1998, and its third album, Fear, Love & War was released on September 11, 2001. In 2010, 9th Prince confirmed that a new album was in the works between the five remaining members (besides Killa Sin) with the first single to be called "The Sound of Gunz" produced by Bronze Nazareth dropping that June. However, production problems and inner dealings have not allowed for the album to be completed. In April 2011, Killarmy released a new single called "One Shot" produced by 4th Disciple. A greatest-hits album was released weeks later by the Wu Music Group label.

In March 2019, Killarmy member, Kinetic 9, was featured in the song "Death 13" on Cryptik Soul's album Killer's Blood.

In January 2020, Kinetic 9 and ShoGun Assason released a seven track EP called “The Truth is Even Darker” with San Francisco-based producer Sticky Ricardo.

In 2020, Killarmy released its fourth album, Full Metal Jackets, which was produced by 9th Prince and featured Prodigal Sunn, Killah Priest, and 60-Second Assassin (Sunz Of Man); Timbo King (Royal Fam); Cappadonna (Wu-Tang Clan); La The Darkman; Reverend William Burk; Ill Bill (Non Phixion); William Cooper (Black Market Militia); Stic Man (Dead Prez); Masta Ace; Planet Asia; Ras Kass; Willie the Kid; and El Camino.

In February 2024, Killarmy released a new single, "Winter Wars 2", which was produced by 9th Prince and features Cappadonna (Wu-Tang Clan), La The Darkman, Killah Priest, Shyheim, and Young Dirty Bastard.

== Discography ==
Group Discography
Album title	Album Info
Silent Weapons for Quiet Wars	Released: August 5, 1997; Billboard 200 chart position: No. 34; R&B/Hip Hop chart position: No. 10; Singles: "Swinging Swords", "Camouflage Ninjas"/"Wake Up", "Wu-Renegades"/"Clash of the Titans"
Dirty Weaponry	Released: August 11, 1998; Billboard 200 chart position: No. 40; R&B/Hip Hop chart position: No. 13; Singles: "Red Dawn"/"Where I Rest At", "The Shoot-Out"
Fear, Love & War	Released: September 11, 2001; Billboard 200 chart position: No. 122; R&B/Hip Hop chart positions: No. 34; Singles: "Street Monopoly"/"Monster", "Feel It"/"Militant", "Nonchalantly"
Full Metal Jackets	Released: April 10, 2020; Billboard 200 chart position: –; R&B/Hip Hop chart positions: –; Singles: "Musical Terrorist", "The Shoot-Out Pt. II"

== Guest appearances (Killa Sin) ==
Artist	Title	Year	
O.C., Raekwon, Notorious B.I.G., Ron G., KRS-One	Stop the Breaks	?	—N/a
Real Live, Cappadonna, Ghostface KIllah, Lord Tariq	Real Live Shit (Remix)	1996	The Turnaround
Shyheim, Rubbabandz, Madman	Young Gods	1996	The Lost Generation
Timbo King, Dreddy Kruger, Shyheim, Tekitha	Soul in the Hole	1997	Soul in the Hole OST
Killah Priest, Antonio	Moanin'	1998	One Step 12"
Funkmaster Flex, Method Man, Raekwon, Inspectah Deck	Wu-Tang Cream Team Line Up	1998	The Mix Tape, Vol. III
Onyx, Method Man, Raekwon	The Worst	1998	Shut Em Down / Ride (soundtrack)
La the Darkman	Heist of the Century	1998	Heist of the Century
Method Man, Inspectah Deck, Streetlife, Raekwon	Spazzola	1998	Tical 2000: Judgement Day
RZA, Black Knights	Terrorist	1998	Bobby Digital: In Stereo
Inspectah Deck, La the Darkman, Baretta 9, Streetlife	9th Chamber	1999	Uncontrolled Substance
RZA, Kinetic 9, Method Man	La Rhumba	2001	Digital Bullet
RZA, Solomon Childs	Fools	2001	Digital Bullet
Ghostface KIllah	Strawberry	2001	Bulletproof Wallets
Inspectah Deck, Kool G Rap	Framed	2003	The Movement
Streetlife	Lay Down	2005	Street Education
Masta KIlla, Free Born, Victorious	East MCs	2006	Made in Brooklyn
Ghostface KIllah, Trife, Cappadonna	Gunz n Razors	2006	More Fish
Ghostface, Roc Marciano	The Black Diamonds	2011	Legendary Weapons
—N/a	The Archer	2012	Man with the Iron Fists OST
Method Man, Hanz, Streetlife, Carlton Fiske	Symphony	2015	The Meth Lab
Ghostface Killah, Apollo Brown	Revenge Is Sweet; Murder Spree	2018	The Lost Tapes

== Videography ==
Videography
Artist(s)	Album Info	Video Title(s)	Release date
Sunz of Man	12" Single	Soldiers of Darkness (featuring Killa Sin, 9th Prince, various Wu-Tang Clan cameos)	1995 Wu-Tang Records
WU All Stars	Soul in the Hole (Motion Picture Soundtrack)	Soul in the Hole (featuring Killa Sin, Dreddy Kruger, Shyheim, Timbo King, Tekitha)	1997 Loud/RCA/BMG Records
Killarmy	Silent Weapons for Quiet Wars	Swinging Swords; Wake Up (featuring Hell Razah, Prodigal Sunn and various Wu-Tang Clan cameos); Fair, Love & War Wu-Renegade	1997 Wu-Tang/Priority/EMI Records
Killarmy	Dirty Weaponry	The Shoot-Out (featuring Rza)	1998 Wu-Tang/Priority/EMI Records
ONYX	Shut 'Em Down	The Worst (featuring Killa Sin, Method Man, Raekwon, Shyheim, X-1)	1998 Tommy Boy/Warner Bros. Records
Killarmy	Fear, Love & War	Feel It	2001 Loud/Relativity Records
Bizz		Realist Spittin (featuring Kinetic 9)	2009 Blakglobe

== See also ==
- List of Wu-Tang Clan affiliates
