= Shyheim =

American rapper (born 1977)

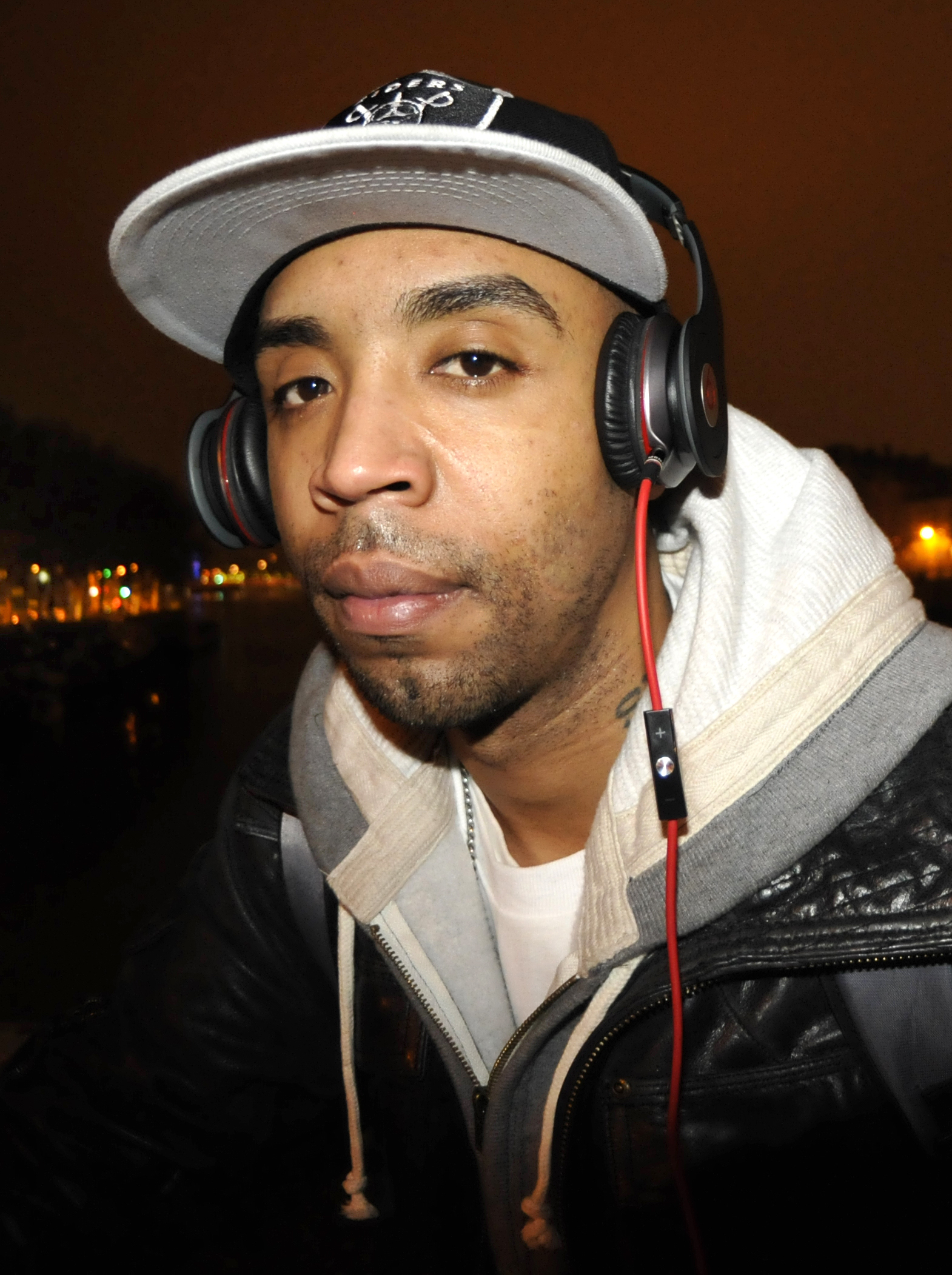
- Shyheim in 2011
- Born: Shyheim Dionel Franklin; November 14, 1977 (age 48); Staten Island, New York City, U.S.
- Other name: The Rugged Child
- Occupations: Rapper; actor
- Years active: 1993–present
- Relatives: Ghostface Killah (cousin)
- Musical career
- Genres: Hip-hop; hardcore hip-hop
- Labels: Virgin/EMI; Wu-Tang/Priority; Nervous

Shyheim Dionel Franklin (born November 14, 1977) is an American rapper from New York better known simply as Shyheim. He initially gained fame as a teenager, releasing his debut album AKA the Rugged Child at the age of 17 in 1994. He has spent the majority of his career affiliated with the Wu-Tang Clan, frequently collaborating with Method Man and Ghostface Killah.

As a teenager, Shyheim was considered one of hip-hop's brightest prospects, being referred to as a "Wunderkind" and a "prodigy", even being admired by fellow rappers such as Jay-Z, who said he "looked up to him" in admiration in his autobiography Decoded.

After 1996's The Lost Generation, Shyheim's career saw a string of underperforming releases over the next 18 years, and was finally derailed due to a hit-and-run conviction. He was released from prison in early 2020.

== Career ==
=== Music ===
Shyheim's Virgin Records debut, AKA the Rugged Child. It included the single "On and On" the video of which featured Method Man, and the album rose to number 7 on the U.S. Billboard R&B chart.

Shyheim joined others, notably the Fugees, to provide a free concert to deaf children in a summer camp in 1996.

Shyheim released another album in 1996, The Lost Generation, which featured members of G.P. Wu and Brooklyn Zu. He also shared the stage with the Notorious B.I.G., Tupac Shakur, Scoob and Big Daddy Kane at Madison Square Garden, for a live freestyle session. He also made an appearance on Big Daddy Kane's "Show & Prove," which featured Ol' Dirty Bastard, Sauce Money, Scoob and Jay-Z.

Shyheim resumed his career after almost a decade and released subsequent albums on the label he founded, Bottom Up Records. His next few albums drew little notice. Shyheim released his sixth solo album, Disrespectfully Speaking, October 2009 on his label Bottom Up Records.

=== Acting ===
Shyheim starred in the video for TLC's "Waterfalls".

He has had roles in films such as the 1996 Pam Grier, Fred Williamson, Jim Brown, and Richard Roundtree vehicle Original Gangstas, In Too Deep, and The Preacher's Wife and he also starred in the television show The Parent Hood. Shyheim appeared in a small role in the prequel Carlito's Way: Rise to Power.

== Legal problems ==
In July 2002, Shyheim was sentenced to a year in prison after second degree attempted robbery. On November 4, 2003, Shyheim was released from prison.

In January 2014, Shyheim turned himself into authorities facing charges for leaving the scene of an accident during a hit-and-run accident that left one person dead. On August 21, 2014, Shyheim was sentenced to 14 years in prison after he pled guilty to second degree manslaughter. He also received a concurrent term of seven years for a gun conviction, and is subject to five years' post release supervision. On January 6, 2020, Shyheim was released from prison after serving a five year sentence.

== Discography ==
=== Studio albums ===
- AKA the Rugged Child (1994) number 52 Billboard 200; number 7 R&B/Hip Hop
- The Lost Generation (1996) number 63 Billboard 200; number 10 R&B/Hip Hop
- Manchild (1999)
- The Greatest Story Never Told (2004)
- Enter the Bottom (2008)
- Disrespectfully Speaking (2009)

=== Guest features ===
Year	Title	Album	Artist(s)
1994	Show & Prove	Daddy's Home	Big Daddy Kane, Jay-Z, Sauce Money, Scoob Lover, ODB
1994	Life of a Shorty	Destination Brooklyn	Vicious
1996	Word Is Bond	702	702
1996	What Does It Mean?	Diamond in the Ruff	Ruffa
1996	It's You That's on My Mind (Remix)	Quindon	Quindon, Smooth
1996	Floatin' On Your Love (Soul To Staten Isle Mix)	Non-album single	The Isley Brothers
1996	Blackberry Molasses (Amiri Remix)	Non-album single	Mista
1996	Lover's Groove (Get Hooked Remix)	Non-album single	Immature
1997	Sugar Honey Ice Tea (NY Hip Hop Mix)	Non-album single	Goodfellaz
1997	Soul in the Hole	Soul in the Hole (soundtrack)	Wu All-Stars
1998	Co-Defendant	The Swarm	Hell Razah
2000	One Four Love Pt. 2	Hip Hop for Respect	Rockness, Cappadonna, Channel Live, Crunch Lo, Wise Intelligent
2001	Big Business	The Yin and the Yang	Cappadonna
2002	Get at Me	The Sting	Two da Road, Black Knights
2002	When You Come Home	The Sting	—N/a
2002	G.A.T.	The Sting	Black Knights, 12' 0clock, North Star, RZA, Solomon Childs
2002	The Proem	Under tha Influence	DJ Quik, Hi-C Talib Kweli

== Filmography ==
- 1996 Original Gangstas as 'Dink'
- 1996 The Preacher's Wife as Teen
- 1999 In Too Deep as 'Che'
- 2005 Carlito's Way: Rise to Power as Unknown

== See also ==
- List of Wu-Tang Clan affiliates
