= List of Wu-Recording record labels =

Starting from the emergence and prominence of Wu-Tang Clan in the mid-1990s, several of the group's members have branched out to create their labels following RZA's lead. Some of the labels have dissolved, while other labels have transitioned into other labels. Also included in this list are some of the group members and affiliates that were/are signed to them.

== Wu-Tang Records (or Wu-Tang Productions) ==
Wu-Tang Records
- Founded: 1992
- Founder: RZA
- Status: Active
- Distributors: Priority; EMI
- Country of origin: United States

A label that existed in the mid 1990s. Although never publicly stated, it is believed that RZA was the CEO. The only known acts on the label were Shyheim, Wu-Syndicate, Killarmy, and Sunz of Man. The current situation of the label is unknown. It was distributed by Priority/EMI Records.

- Black Knights
- Killarmy
- Royal Fam
- Shyheim
- Sunz of Man
- U-God
- Northstar
- Wu-Syndicate
- Masta Killa

== Razor Sharp Records ==
Razor Sharp Records
- Parent company: Sony Music Entertainment (SME)
- Founded: 1996
- Founder: RZA; Divine
- Status: Active
- Distributor: Epic
- Country of origin: United States

Razor Sharp Records is a recording label that was believed to also be run by RZA. However, the label was run by his brother, Divine. The label was founded in the early 1990s around the time that RZA produced Method Man's Tical, Raekwon's Only Built 4 Cuban Linx..., Ol' Dirty Bastard's Return to the 36 Chambers: The Dirty Version, The GZA's Liquid Swords and Ghostface Killah's Ironman. Although the label received returning profits and proceeds on every album made by each clan member, very few acts were seen on the label, most notably Cappadonna, who had close ties with the group, and was often believed to be an unofficial member, until his official induction prior to 8 Diagrams. Sophia Chang was the manager of this label in 1999. The current situation of the label is unknown, although it is possible that the label dissolved or possibly became one of the more recent Wu labels. It was distributed by Epic Records & Sony Music. RZA relaunched Razor Sharp Records with Mike Smith and King Tech.

- Cappadonna
- Ghostface Killah
- Tekitha
- Jammie Sommers

== 36 Chambers Records and Wu Music Group ==
36 Chambers Records
- Founded: 2016
- Founder: RZA
- Country of origin: United States

Wu Music Group
- Founded: 2005
- Founder: RZA
- Country of origin: United States

Other record labels, known as 36 Chambers Records and Wu Music Group were also founded, and are still active in the present.

== Wu-Tang International ==
Wu-Tang International
- Founded: 2005
- Founder: RZA
- Country of origin: United States

Another label founded by the RZA. Unlike the other labels, it signed hip-hop talent from countries outside of the United States. Cilvaringz was signed to the label. Wu-Tang International no longer exists as a label.

- Cilvaringz

== Soul Temple Records ==
Upon completion of his film directorial debut work The Man with the Iron Fists, RZA founded Soul Temple Records. The label has since released Ghostface Killah's Twelve Reasons to Die and U-God's solo album Keynote Speaker both executive produced by RZA. The label has also released Wu-Tang Clan's sixth studio album A Better Tomorrow.

== Liquid Swords Entertainment ==
Liquid Swords Entertainment
- Founded: 2008
- Founder: GZA
- Status: Active
- Distributor: Babygrande
- Country of origin: United States

An independent record label founded by the GZA, named after his second studio album and title track of the same names. Created in 2008 with the GZA's first release for the label, Pro Tools. It is distributed through a partnership with Babygrande Records.

- GZA
